= Chris O'Ryan =

Australian music producer and sound engineer

- Also known as: Tek
- Born: July 6, 1980 (age 46)
- Occupations: Record producer, audio engineer
- Years active: 2003–present
- Label: Tekzenmusic Inc.

Chris O'Ryan (born July 6, 1980), known professionally as Tek, is an Australian record producer and sound engineer. He is best known for his sound engineering and vocal production work for music industry artists, including Justin Bieber, Katy Perry, Mary J. Blige,Ciara and Mariah Carey.

== Early life and education ==
O'Ryan began studying music at the age of eight when he took up piano and choir. In 1992, at the age of 12, he sang in Opera Australia's production of Hansel and Gretel. He then studied music for two years at Box Hill College of Music in Melbourne, Australia.

== Career ==
O'Ryan relocated to Los Angeles after completing his studies to pursue music in the United States. He began working as an unpaid intern for a small label and worked his way up to the position of lead engineer. While at this company, he connected with multiple producers and songwriters from Atlanta, including Tricky Stewart, The Dream & Poo Bear, whom he would later collaborate with.

In 2006, O'Ryan reunited with Tricky Stewart and over the next few years, he engineered records for Usher, Mariah Carey, Celine Dion, Rihanna, and Mary J. Blige, for which he won a Grammy Award. During this time, he began using Melodyne for vocal tuning. He has tuned over 1,000 releases and network television shows.

In 2011, O'Ryan incorporated his entertainment company Tekzenmusic Inc., and in 2013, started building his studio TZM Studios. In early 2014, TZM Studios was operational with its first major clients being Justin Bieber and Mariah Carey.

In 2017, O'Ryan signed the Australian music producer Black Summer and released his debut single "Young Like Me (feat. Lowell)" under the label Tekzenmusic. The music video, directed by Tim Maxx, was filmed in Los Angeles and released on national television in Australia on Nine Network. In April 2022, O’Ryan filed a lawsuit in Los Angeles Superior Court against Justin Bieber and his company JRC Entertainment and music executive and Justin Bieber's manager Scooter Braun, alleging breach of contract, promissory estoppel, and intentional interference with contractual relations. The suit claims that O’Ryan was promised compensation consisting of a per-track fee and a one-percent share (“point”) of master recording revenue for songs he worked on beginning in 2018, an agreement he alleges was later revoked. The complaint also asserts that O’Ryan was not properly credited for his contributions on many recordings, including “Despacito,” which his attorneys argue adversely affected his professional recognition and career opportunities.

== Discography ==
Year	Title	Artist	Role
2003	Take It To The Floor	B2K	Engineer
2003	Smells Like A Party	B2K	Engineer
2003	Do That Thing	B2K	Engineer
2003	Out The Hood	B2K	Engineer
2003	Fizzo Got Flow	B2K	Engineer
2003	Sprung	B2K	Engineer
2003	Take It To The Floor	B2K	Engineer
2003	Badaboom	B2K	Engineer
2003	Streets Is Callin'	B2K	Engineer
2003	Smile	B2K	Engineer
2003	Pop That Booty	Marques Houston	Engineer, Mixing
2003	MH	Marques Houston	Engineer, Mixing
2003	That Girl	Marques Houston	Engineer, Mixing
2003	Good Luck	Marques Houston	Engineer, Mixing
2003	Clubbin	Marques Houston	Engineer, Mixing
2004	Freaky	Young Rome & Rufus Blaq	Engineer
2004	Afterparty	Omarion & Young Rome	Engineer
2004	45 Minutes	O'Ryan	Engineer
2004	Shorty	O'Ryan	Engineer
2004	She Loves The Club	O'Ryan	Engineer
2004	Bad Situation	O'Ryan	Engineer
2004	Smells Like A Party	O'Ryan	Engineer
2004	I'm Coming	O'Ryan	Engineer
2004	Food for Thought	Young Rome	Engineer
2004	Baby Mama Love	Jermaine Dupri / N2U	Engineer
2005	O	Omarion	Engineer
2005	Growing Pains	Omarion	Engineer
2005	In The Dark	Omarion	Engineer
2005	Slow Dancin'	Omarion	Engineer
2005	Take It Off	Omarion	Engineer
2005	I Know	Omarion	Engineer
2005	Naked	Marques Houston	Engineer, Mixing
2005	Issues	N2U	Engineer, Audio Engineer
2005	Brings the Heat, Vol. 1	Wendy Williams	Engineer, Vocals
2005	All Because of You	Marques Houston	Engineer, Mixing
2005	The Boondocks Theme Song	The Boondocks	Mixing
2006	Split Personality	Mila J	Engineer, Mixing
2006	Go Public	Mila J	Engineer, Mixing
2006	I've Been Hustled	Mila J	Engineer, Mixing
2006	Good Lookin Out	Mila J	Engineer, Mixing
2006	I'm Mi	Mila J	Engineer, Mixing
2006	Complete	Mila J	Engineer, Mixing
2006	Things You Do	Mila J	Engineer, Mixing
2006	Tell Me Where I'd Be	Mila J	Engineer, Mixing
2006	Wait A Minute	Mila J	Engineer, Mixing
2006	21	Omarion	Engineer
2006	Entourage	Omarion	Engineer
2006	The Making Of You	Omarion	Engineer
2006	Been With A Star	Omarion	Engineer
2006	What Are We Doing	Omarion	Engineer
2006	The Truth	Omarion	Engineer
2006	Electric	Omarion	Engineer
2006	Come To Me	P. Diddy feat. Nicole Scherzinger	Engineer
2007	Veteran	Marques Houston	Engineer, Mixing, Guitar
2007	Wonderful	Marques Houston	Engineer, Mixing
2007	Kimberly	Marques Houston	Engineer, Mixing, Guitar
2007	Favorite Girl	Marques Houston	Engineer, Mixing
2007	Hold N' Back	Marques Houston	Engineer, Mixing
2007	So Right For Me	Marques Houston	Engineer, Mixing
2007	Tyler Perry's Daddy's Little Girls (film)	Brown Eyed Blues	Producer, Engineer, Mixing, Tracking, Vocal Producer, Instrumentation, Composer
2007	She Said, I Said (Time We Let Go)	NLT	Mixing
2007	Love/Hate	The-Dream	Engineer
2007	I Luv Your Girl	The-Dream	Engineer
2007	Fast Car	The-Dream	Engineer
2007	Nikki	The-Dream	Engineer
2007	She Needs My Love	The-Dream	Engineer
2007	Falsetto	The-Dream	Engineer
2007	Playin' In Her Hair	The-Dream	Engineer
2007	Purple Kisses	The-Dream	Engineer
2007	Ditch That...	The-Dream	Engineer
2007	Luv Songs	The-Dream	Engineer
2007	Livin' A Lie	The-Dream feat. Rihanna	Engineer
2007	Mama	The-Dream	Engineer
2007	Neva	The-Dream	Engineer
2007	Crash	The-Dream	Engineer
2007	Just Fine	Mary J. Blige	Engineer
2007	Stay Down	Mary J. Blige	Engineer
2007	Till The Morning	Mary J. Blige	Engineer
2007	Roses	Mary J. Blige	Engineer
2007	Fade Away	Mary J. Blige	Engineer
2007	Smoke	Mary J. Blige	Engineer
2007	Come To Me	Mary J. Blige	Engineer
2007	Essential R&B: Summer 2007		Engineer
2008	Yours, Mine and the Truth	Sterling Simms	Engineer, Audio Engineer
2008	The Quilt	Gym Class Heroes	Engineer
2008	Digital Girl	Jamie Foxx	Production Engineer, Audio Engineer
2008	Slow	Jamie Foxx	Production Engineer, Audio Engineer
2008	Trading Places	Usher	Guitar Solo, Engineer
2008	This Ain't Sex	Usher	Engineer
2008	Moving Mountains	Usher	Engineer
2008	Departure	Jesse McCartney	Engineer, Recording
2008	Please Excuse My Hands	Plies feat. Jamie Foxx & The-Dream	Engineer, Vocal Tuner
2009	Ultraviolet	Kid Sister	Producer
2009	On And On	Utada	Engineer
2009	Dirty Desire	Utada	Engineer
2009	Taking My Money Back	Utada	Engineer
2009	This One	Utada	Engineer
2009	Automatic Part II	Utada	Engineer
2009	Dirty Desire Remixes	Utada	Engineer
2009	Rockstar 101	Rihanna feat. Slash	Engineer
2009	R&B Summer Anthems		Producer
2009	I Want To Know What Love Is	Mariah Carey	Engineer
2009	H.A.T.E.U	Mariah Carey	Engineer
2009	The Impossible (the reprise)	Mariah Carey	Engineer
2009	Ribbon	Mariah Carey	Engineer
2009	Up Out My Face	Mariah Carey	Engineer
2009	More Than Just Friends	Mariah Carey	Engineer
2009	Languishing	Mariah Carey	Engineer
2009	Candy Bling	Mariah Carey	Engineer
2009	The Impossible	Mariah Carey	Engineer
2009	Right Side Of My Brain	The-Dream	Engineer
2009	Put It Down	The-Dream	Engineer
2009	Rockin' That Shit	The-Dream	Engineer
2009	Let Me See The Booty	The-Dream	Engineer
2009	Love vs Money	The-Dream	Engineer
2009	Love vs Money Pt. 2	The-Dream	Engineer
2009	My Love	The-Dream	Engineer
2009	Mr. Yeah	The-Dream	Engineer
2009	Take U Home 2 My Mama	The-Dream	Engineer
2009	Sweat It Out	The-Dream	Engineer
2009	Fancy	The-Dream	Engineer
2009	Kelly's 12 Play	The-Dream	Engineer
2009	Rockin' That Shit - Rap Remix	The-Dream	Engineer
2009	Love vs Money	The-Dream	Engineer
2009	Throw It In The Bag	Fabolous	Engineer
2009	Def Jam 25: DJ Bring That Back		Engineer
2009	Slow Jukin	Young Steff	Producer, composer, engineer, mixer, guitar, instruments, vocal production
2009	One Time	Justin Bieber	Engineer, vocal tuning
2009	One Less Lonely Girl	Justin Bieber	Engineer, vocal tuning
2009	Let's Get Excited	Alesha Dixon	Engineer
2009	Digital Girl Remix	Jamie Foxx, Drake, Kanye West, The-Dream	Vocal Producer, engineer
2010	The Love Trilogy	The-Dream	Engineer, Production Engineer
2010	Glad You Came	The Wanted	Engineer
2010	Who Dat Girl	Flo Rida feat. Akon	Engineer
2010	Baby	Justin Bieber	Engineer, vocal tuning
2010	Stuck In The Moment	Justin Bieber	Engineer, vocal tuning
2010	Kiss And Tell	Justin Bieber	Engineer, vocal tuning
2010	Eenie Meenie	Justin Bieber & Sean Kingston	Engineer, vocal tuning
2010	Listen Up! The Official 2010 FIFA World Cup Album	Ke Nako	Engineer
2010	Ass On The Floor	Diddy feat. Swizz Beats	Engineer, vocal tuning
2010	Yeah Yeah You Would	Diddy	Engineer, vocal tuning
2010	I Hate That You Love Me	Diddy	Engineer, vocal tuning
2010	Shades	Diddy feat. Lil Wayne, Justin Timberlake, Bilal & James Fauntleroy	Engineer, vocal tuning
2010	Angels	Diddy feat. The Notorious B.I.G & Rick Ross	Engineer, vocal tuning
2010	Strobe Lights	Diddy feat. Lil Wayne	Engineer, vocal tuning
2010	Loving You No More	Diddy feat. Drake	Engineer, vocal tuning
2010	Last Night Pt. 2	Diddy	Engineer, vocal tuning
2010	Yesterday	Diddy feat. Chris Brown	Engineer, vocal tuning
2010	Change	Diddy	Engineer, vocal tuning
2010	Just Dance, Vol. 3		Engineer
2010	We R Who We R	Kesha	Engineer
2010	Blow	Kesha	Engineer
2010	Cannibal	Kesha	Engineer
2010	Sleazy	Kesha	Engineer
2010	The Harold Song	Kesha	Engineer
2010	Grow A Pear	Kesha	Engineer
2010	C U Next Tuesday	Kesha	Engineer
2010	Best Night of My Life	Jamie Foxx	Production Engineer
2010	Ride	Ciara	Engineer
2010	I Run It	Ciara	Engineer
2010	Heavy Rotation	Ciara	Engineer
2010	Gimmie Dat	Ciara	Engineer
2010	Sleazy Remix 2.0	Kesha	Engineer
2010	Move That Body	Nelly	Engineer, Vocal Producer
2011	I'm Dat Chick	Kelly Rowland	Engineer, Vocal Tuning
2011	Like My Mother Does	Lauren Alaina	Engineer, Vocal Tuning
2011	Who's Laughing Now	Jessie J	Engineer
2011	Price Tag	Jessie J	Vocal Producer, engineer
2011	Abracadabra	Jessie J	Vocal Producer, engineer
2011	Only Thing I Ever Get For Christmas	Justin Bieber	Engineer, Vocal Tuning
2011	Mistletoe	Justin Bieber	Engineer, Vocal Tuning
2011	The Christmas Song	Justin Bieber	Engineer, Vocal Tuning
2011	Santa Claus Is Coming To Town	Justin Bieber	Engineer, Vocal Tuning
2011	Fa La La La	Justin Bieber	Engineer, Vocal Tuning
2011	All I Want For Christmas Is You	Justin Bieber & Mariah Carey	Engineer, Vocal Tuning
2011	Drummer Boy	Justin Bieber feat. Busta Rhymes	Engineer, Vocal Tuning
2011	Christmas Eve	Justin Bieber	Engineer, Vocal Tuning
2011	All I Want Is You	Justin Bieber	Engineer, Vocal Tuning
2011	Home This Christmas	Justin Bieber feat. The Band Perry	Engineer, Vocal Tuning
2011	Silent Night	Justin Bieber	Engineer, Vocal Tuning
2011	Christmas Love	Justin Bieber	Engineer, Vocal Tuning
2011	Fa La La	Justin Bieber feat. Boyz II Men	Engineer, Vocal Tuning
2011	Pray	Justin Bieber	Engineer, Vocal Tuning
2011	Someday At Christmas	Justin Bieber	Engineer, Vocal Tuning
2011	No Idea	Big Time Rush	Engineer, Vocal Tuning
2011	Oath	Cher Lloyd feat. Becky G	Engineer, Vocal Producer
2011	My Life II... The Journey Continues (Act 1)	Mary J. Blige	Engineer
2011	On The Floor	Jennifer Lopez	Engineer, Vocal Tuning
2011	Papi	Jennifer Lopez	Engineer, Vocal Tuning
2011	Hypnotico	Jennifer Lopez	Engineer, Vocal Tuning
2011	Good Hit	Jennifer Lopez	Engineer, Vocal Tuning
2011	Charge Me Up	Jennifer Lopez	Engineer, Vocal Tuning
2011	Take Care	Jennifer Lopez	Engineer, Vocal Tuning
2011	I'm Into You	Jennifer Lopez	Engineer, Vocal Tuning
2011	Until It Beats No More	Jennifer Lopez	Engineer, Vocal Tuning
2011	Invading My Mind	Jennifer Lopez	Engineer, Vocal Tuning
2011	Everybody's Girl	Jennifer Lopez	Engineer, Vocal Tuning
2011	On The Floor (Ven a Bailar)	Jennifer Lopez	Engineer, Vocal Tuning
2011	On The Floor - Low Sunday	Jennifer Lopez	Engineer, Vocal Tuning
2011	Run The World	Jennifer Lopez	Engineer, Vocal Tuning
2011	Trip To Your Heart	Britney Spears	Engineer
2011	American Idol Season 10 Highlights	Lauren Alaina	Engineer
2011	Rocket	The Wanted	Engineer, Vocal Tuning
2011	Songs For Women	Frank Ocean	Engineer, Vocal Tuning
2011	Swim Good	Frank Ocean	Engineer, Vocal Tuning
2011	Trip	Frank Ocean	Engineer, Vocal Tuning
2011	Novacane	Frank Ocean	Engineer, Vocal Tuning
2012	Believe	Justin Bieber	Engineer, Vocal Tuning
2012	Fall	Justin Bieber	Engineer, Vocal Tuning
2012	Boyfriend	Justin Bieber	Engineer, Vocal Tuning
2012	Thought Of You	Justin Bieber	Engineer, Vocal Tuning
2012	Right Here	Justin Bieber	Engineer, Vocal Tuning
2012	Die In Your Arms	Justin Bieber	Engineer, Vocal Tuning
2012	Catching Feelings	Justin Bieber	Engineer, Vocal Tuning
2012	Out Of Town Girl	Justin Bieber	Engineer, Vocal Tuning
2012	Be Alright	Justin Bieber	Engineer, Vocal Tuning
2012	She Don't Like The Lights	Justin Bieber	Engineer, Vocal Tuning
2012	As Long As You Love Me	Justin Bieber	Engineer, Vocal Tuning
2012	Take You	Justin Bieber	Engineer, Vocal Tuning
2012	Goin' In	Jennifer Lopez	Engineer, Vocal Tuning
2012	Bailar Nada Más	Jennifer Lopez	Engineer, Vocal Tuning
2012	Think Like A Man	Rick Ross, Ne-Yo & Jennifer Hudson	Engineer, Vocal Tuning
2012	I'm Legit	Nicki Minaj & Ciara	Engineer, Vocal Producer
2012	Call My Name	Cheryl	Engineer, Vocal Tuning
2012	Woman To Woman	Keyshia Cole & Ashanti	Engineer, Vocal Tuning
2012	Next Move	Keyshia Cole feat. Robin Thicke	Engineer, Vocal Tuning
2012	I Choose You	Keyshia Cole	Engineer, Vocal Tuning
2012	Signature	Keyshia Cole	Engineer, Vocal Tuning
2012	Hey Sexy	Keyshia Cole	Engineer, Vocal Tuning
2012	Get It Right	Keyshia Cole	Engineer, Vocal Tuning
2012	Too Many Fish	Karmin	Engineer
2012	Coming Up Strong	Karmin	Engineer
2012	I Told You So	Karmin	Engineer
2012	Dance Again	Jennifer Lopez feat. Pitbull	Engineer, Vocal Tuning
2012	iCarly: iSoundtrack II (Original TV Soundtrack)		Engineer
2012	Wild Ones	Flo Rida	Engineer
2012	Trespassing	Adam Lambert	Vocal Editing
2012	Think Like A Man (Music From and Inspired By the Film)		Engineer, Vocal Engineer
2012	Step Up Revolution (film)		Engineer
2012	Pink Friday: Roman Reloaded - The Re-Up	Nicki Minaj	Engineer
2012	Love Me Now	Melanie Amaro	Engineer, Vocal Tuning
2012	Paradise	Cody Simpson	Engineer, Vocal Producer
2012	I Will Always Love You: The Best of Whitney Houston	Whitney Houston	Engineer
2012	Hello	Karmin	Engineer
2012	Femme Fatale/Circus	Britney Spears	Engineer
2012	Domino: Remix EP	Jessie J	Engineer
2012	I Wish I Knew	Alex Boyd	Producer
2012	Dirty Bass	Far East Movement	Vocal Editing, Vocal Engineer
2012	Dance Again... The Hits	Jennifer Lopez	Engineer, Vocal Editing
2012	A Symphony of British Music: Music for the Closing Ceremony of the London 2012 Olympic Games		Engineer
2012	A Million Lights	Cheryl	Engineer
2012	Rum And Raybans	Sean Kingston feat. Cher Lloyd	Engineer
2012	Let It Grow (Celebrate The World)	The Lorax Soundtrack Ester Dean	Vocal Tuning
2012	Thneedville	The Lorax Soundtrack	Vocal Tuning
2012	This Is The Place	The Lorax Soundtrack Ed Helms	Vocal Tuning
2012	Everybody Needs a Thneed	The Lorax Soundtrack Ed Helms & The 88	Vocal Tuning
2012	How Bad Can I Be?	The Lorax Soundtrack Ed Helms	Vocal Tuning
2012	Let It Grow	The Lorax Soundtrack Jenny Slate, Betty White & Rob Riggle	Vocal Tuning
2012	Thneedville (Original Demo)	The Lorax Soundtrack	Vocal Tuning
2013	Used By You	Marcus Canty	Engineer
2013	Don't Pass Me By	Marcus Canty	Engineer
2013	Not Looking	Marcus Canty	Engineer
2013	The Way	Ariana Grande	Vocal Engineer
2013	The Smurfs 2: Music From and Inspired By		Engineer, Vocal Producer
2013	A Light That Never Comes	Linkin Park	Engineer
2013	A Light That Never Comes - Rick Rubin Reboot	Linkin Park	Engineer
2013	Loved Me Back to Life	Celine Dion	Engineer
2013	Love In The Sky	The Weeknd	Engineer
2013	Tears In The Rain	The Weeknd	Engineer
2013	Live For	The Weeknd feat. Drake	Engineer
2013	Heartbreaker	Justin Bieber	Engineer
2013	Red	Cher	Engineer
2013	Pride	Cher	Engineer
2013	Woman's World	Cher	Engineer
2013	Sophomore	Ciara	Engineer, Vocal Tuning
2013	DUI	Ciara	Engineer, Vocal Tuning
2013	Read My Lips	Ciara	Engineer, Vocal Tuning
2013	Overdose	Ciara	Engineer, Vocal Tuning
2013	I Would	Justin Bieber	Engineer, Vocal Tuning
2013	Yellow Raincoat	Justin Bieber	Engineer, Vocal Tuning
2013	Fall - Live	Justin Bieber	Engineer, Vocal Tuning
2013	Be Alright - Acoustic	Justin Bieber	Engineer, Vocal Tuning
2013	As Long As You Love Me - Acoustic	Justin Bieber	Engineer, Vocal Tuning
2013	She Don't Like The Lights - Acoustic	Justin Bieber	Engineer, Vocal Tuning
2013	Take You - Acoustic	Justin Bieber	Engineer, Vocal Tuning
2013	Nothing Like Us	Justin Bieber	Engineer, Vocal Tuning
2013	Boyfriend - Acoustic	Justin Bieber	Engineer, Vocal Tuning
2013	Beauty And A Beat - Acoustic	Justin Bieber	Engineer, Vocal Tuning
2013	All Around The World - Acoustic	Justin Bieber	Engineer, Vocal Tuning
2013	Live It Up	Jennifer Lopez	Engineer, Vocal Tuning
2013	magik 2.0	Becky G feat. Austin Mahone	Vocal Producer
2013	We Can't Stop	Miley Cyrus	Engineer
2013	Love Money Party	Miley Cyrus feat. Big Sean	Engineer
2013	Hands In The Air	Miley Cyrus feat. Ludacris	Engineer
2013	Drive	Miley Cyrus	Engineer
2013	Maybe You're Right	Miley Cyrus	Engineer
2013	Someone Else	Miley Cyrus	Engineer
2013	SMS (Bangerz)	Miley Cyrus feat. Britney Spears	Engineer
2013	Hey Love	Quadron	Engineer, Vocal Tuning
2013	In The Meantime	Raheem DeVaughn	Mixing
2013	#thatPOWER	will.i.am feat. Justin Bieber	Vocal Engineer
2013	Soldier In the City	Aloe Blacc	Engineer, Vocal Tuning
2013	Wake Me Up	Aloe Blacc	Engineer, Vocal Tuning
2013	All The Way	Time Flies	Engineer
2013	Flatline	Justin Bieber	Engineer, Vocal Tuning
2013	Change Me	Justin Bieber	Engineer, Vocal Tuning
2013	PYD	Justin Bieber	Engineer, Vocal Tuning
2013	Hold Tight	Justin Bieber	Engineer, Vocal Tuning
2013	What's Hatnin'	Justin Bieber	Engineer, Vocal Tuning
2013	Confident	Justin Bieber	Engineer, Vocal Tuning
2013	Heartbreaker	Justin Bieber	Engineer, Vocal Tuning
2013	Swap It Out	Justin Bieber	Engineer, Vocal Tuning
2013	Bad Day	Justin Bieber	Engineer, Vocal Tuning
2013	Memphis	Justin Bieber	Engineer, Vocal Tuning
2013	All That Matters	Justin Bieber	Engineer, Vocal Tuning
2013	Roller Coaster	Justin Bieber	Engineer, Vocal Tuning
2013	All Bad	Justin Bieber	Engineer, Vocal Tuning
2013	One Life	Justin Bieber	Engineer, Vocal Tuning
2013	Recovery	Justin Bieber	Engineer, Vocal Tuning
2013	Under	Ahsan	Engineer
2013	Rear View	Flo Rida	Mixing
2013	Sex Playlist	Omarion	Engineer, Vocal Tuning
2013	Inside	Omarion	Engineer, Vocal Tuning
2013	Steam	Omarion	Engineer, Vocal Tuning
2013	Work	Omarion	Engineer, Vocal Tuning
2013	Believe (film)	Justin Bieber	Music Director
2013	Black	The-Dream	Engineer
2013	Tears Fall	Jacquie Lee	Vocal Producer, Engineer
2013	You Don't Know Me	Jasmine V	Vocal Producer, Engineer
2013	Melodies	Madison Beer	Engineer
2014	Love Letter	Keyshia Cole feat. Future	Engineer, Vocal Tuning
2014	Remember Pt. 2	Keyshia Cole	Engineer, Vocal Tuning
2014	New Nu	Keyshia Cole	Engineer, Vocal Tuning
2014	Who Are You Loving Now?	Danny Mercer	Engineer
2014	Grateful	Rita Ora	Engineer
2014	Run	Nicole Scherzinger	Vocal Producer, Engineer
2014	Unison	Nicole Scherzinger	Vocal Producer, Engineer
2014	Electric Blue	Nicole Scherzinger feat. T.I	Vocal Producer, Engineer
2014	Girl With A Diamond Heart	Nicole Scherzinger	Vocal Producer, Engineer
2014	God Of War	Nicole Scherzinger	Vocal Producer, Engineer
2014	Heartbreaker	Nicole Scherzinger	Vocal Producer, Engineer
2014	She's A Keeper	Snootie Wild feat. August Alsina	Engineer, Vocal Tuning
2014	Sober	Niykee Heaton	Engineer, Vocal Tuner
2014	Champagne	Niykee Heaton	Engineer, Vocal Tuner
2014	All My Love feat. Ariana Grande	Major Lazer	Engineer
2014	Bang My Head feat. Sia	David Guetta	Engineer
2014	I Want It All	Karmin	Engineer, Vocal Producer
2014	Drifter	Karmin	Engineer, Vocal Producer
2014	What I Did For Love	David Guetta	Vocal Engineer
2014	Stronger	Marsha Ambrosius feat. Dr. Dre	Engineer
2015	Do It Again feat. Chris Brown & Tyga	Pia Mia	Vocal Producer, Engineer
2015	A Story Of A Dozen Roses	Jamie Foxx	Engineer
2015	Matches feat. Jason Derulo	Travis McCoy	Engineer
2015	The Whitney Houston Story (film)	Deborah Cox	Vocal Producer, Engineer, Mixing
2015	What I Did For Love feat. Emile Sande	David Guetta	Engineer
2015	Solitaire	Karina Pasian	Engineer
2015	Baby's In Love feat. Kid Ink	Jamie Foxx	Engineer
2015	Too Hot	Jodeci	Vocal Tuner
2015	Sho Out	Jodeci	Vocal Tuner
2015	Checkin For You	Jodeci	Vocal Tuner
2015	Those Things	Jodeci	Vocal Tuner
2015	Every Moment	Jodeci	Vocal Tuner
2015	Nobody Wins	Jodeci	Vocal Tuner
2015	Incredible	Jodeci	Vocal Tuner
2015	Jennifer	Jodeci	Vocal Tuner
2015	Body Parts	Jodeci	Vocal Tuner
2015	Stress Reliever	Jodeci	Vocal Tuner
2015	Why'd You Call feat. Ty$ & Makkonen	DJ Mustard	Engineer
2015	Infinity (Remix)	Mariah Carey	Engineer
2015	The Right Song feat. Natalie La Rose	Tiësto	Vocal Producer, Engineer
2015	Find Me	Stanaj	Engineer
2015	Party Favors	Tinashe	Engineer, Vocal Tuner
2015	Call On Me	Starley	Engineer, Co-Mixing
2015	Not For Nothin'	Nico & Vinz	Engineer
2015	Paint It Black	Ciara	Vocal Producer, Engineer, Mixing
2015	Skillrex and Diplo Present Jack Ü	Diplo / Jack Ü / Skillrex / Skillrex & Diplo	Vocal Engineer
2015	Love Yourself	Justin Bieber	Engineer, Vocal Tuner
2015	Sorry - Latino Remix	Justin Bieber	Engineer, Vocal Tuner
2015	The Feeling	Justin Bieber	Engineer, Vocal Tuner
2015	What Do You Mean	Justin Bieber	Engineer, Vocal Tuner
2015	What Do You Mean - Acoustic	Justin Bieber	Engineer, Vocal Tuner
2015	Get Used To It	Justin Bieber	Engineer, Vocal Tuner
2015	Company	Justin Bieber	Engineer, Vocal Tuner
2015	Sorry	Justin Bieber	Engineer, Vocal Tuner
2015	No Pressure	Justin Bieber	Engineer, Vocal Tuner
2015	Purpose	Justin Bieber	Engineer, Vocal Tuner
2015	All In It	Justin Bieber	Engineer, Vocal Tuner
2015	I'll Show You	Justin Bieber	Engineer, Vocal Tuner
2015	Life Is Worth Living	Justin Bieber	Engineer, Vocal Tuner
2015	Been You	Justin Bieber	Engineer, Vocal Tuner
2015	No Sense	Justin Bieber	Engineer, Vocal Tuner
2015	Listen Again	David Guetta	Vocal Engineer
2015	I Bet	Ciara	Engineer, Vocal Producer
2015	That's How I'm Feelin'	Ciara feat. Pitbull & Missy Elliott	Engineer, Vocal Producer
2015	Jackie (B.M.F)	Ciara	Engineer, Vocal Producer
2015	Lullaby	Ciara	Engineer, Vocal Producer
2015	One Woman Army	Ciara	Engineer, Vocal Producer
2015	Fly	Ciara	Engineer, Vocal Producer
2015	All Good	Ciara	Engineer, Vocal Producer
2015	Kiss & Tell	Ciara	Engineer, Vocal Producer
2015	I Bet - Joe Jonas Remix	Ciara	Engineer, Vocal Producer
2015	Stuck On You	Ciara	Engineer, Vocal Producer
2015	I Bet - R3hab Remix	Ciara	Engineer, Vocal Producer
2015	I Got You	Ciara	Engineer, Vocal Producer
2015	Only One	Ciara	Engineer, Vocal Producer
2016	Infinity	Niykee Heaton	Engineer
2016	Strong feat. Selena Gomez	Justin Bieber	Engineer
2016	Hotline Bling (Remix)	Justin Bieber	Engineer
2016	One Dance (Remix)	Justin Bieber	Engineer
2016	My Girl	Alex Marshall	Vocal Producer, Engineer, Mixing
2016	Hurricane	Alex Marshall	Vocal Producer, Engineer, Mixing
2016	WTF	We The Folk	Mastering
2016	Lookin' At You	Lewis Hamilton	Engineer
2016	Sugar (Remix)	Karmin	Mixing
2016	Trust Nobody feat. Selena Gomez	Cashmere Cat	Vocal Producer, Engineer
2016	Alone	Alan Walker	Engineer
2016	Summer Nights feat. John Legend	Tiësto	Vocal Producer, Engineer
2017	I'm Every Woman	Deborah Cox	Mixing
2017	I Have Nothing	Deborah Cox	Mixing
2017	All The Man I Need	Deborah Cox	Mixing
2017	I Wanna Dance With Somebody	Deborah Cox	Mixing
2017	Run To You	Deborah Cox	Mixing
2017	Jesus Loves Me	Deborah Cox	Mixing
2017	I Will Always Love You	Deborah Cox	Mixing
2017	Starving feat. Zedd	Hailee Steinfeld	Vocal Producer, Engineer
2017	Show You Love	Sigala, Kato & Hailee Steinfeld	Vocal Producer, Engineer
2017	Somewhere Over The Rainbow - Live From Manchester	Ariana Grande	Mixer
2017	Let Me Love You	Justin Bieber	Engineer
2017	At My Best feat. Hailee Steinfeld	Machine Gun Kelly	Vocal Producer, Engineer
2017	I'll Keep A Light On In My Window	The Get Down (soundtrack)	Vocal Producer, Engineer
2017	I'm My #1	The Get Down (soundtrack)	Vocal Producer, Engineer
2017	Toy Box	The Get Down (soundtrack)	Vocal Producer, Engineer
2017	The Other Side (The Duet)	The Get Down (soundtrack)	Vocal Producer, Engineer
2017	Ignite	Alan Walker	Engineer
2017	Break It	Tallia Storm	Engineer
2017	Still In Love	Tallia Storm	Engineer
2017	Lone Wolf	Lowell	Engineer, Mixing, Producer
2017	Stay Together	Noah Cyrus	Co-Vocal Producer, Engineer
2017	Most Girls	Hailee Steinfeld	Vocal Producer, Engineer
2017	Young Like Me feat. Lowell	Black Summer	Vocal Producer, Engineer, Mixing
2017	Tired	Alan Walker	Vocal Producer, Engineer
2017	Despacito (Remix)	Luis Fonsi & Daddy Yankee feat. Justin Bieber	Engineer
2017	2U	David Guetta feat. Justin Bieber	Engineer, Vocoder
2017	He Like That	Fifth Harmony	Vocal Producer, Engineer
2017	Meant to Be	Ananya Birla	Vocal Producer, Engineer
2018	Juice	Chromeo	Vocal Producer, Engineer
2018	One Track Mind	Chromeo	Vocal Producer, Engineer
2018	Bad Decision	Chromeo	Vocal Producer, Engineer
2018	Don't Sleep	Chromeo	Vocal Producer, Engineer
2018	Alone	Alan Walker	Vocal Producer
2018	Beat Goes On	Plaid Brixx	Engineer
2018	Wanna Be Loved	Plaid Brixx	Engineer
2018	All About Tonight	Plaid Brixx	Engineer
2018	Friends	Justin Bieber	Engineer
2018	Issues - Logo Performance]	Julia Michaels	Engineer
2018	Worst Of Me - Vevo Performance	Julia Michaels	Engineer
2018	Uh Huh - Vevo Performance	Julia Michaels	Engineer
2018	Jump - Acoustic	Julia Michaels	Engineer
2018	Nowhere Fast	Miles Wesley	Engineer
2018	Hold On	Ananya Birla	Vocal Producer, Engineer
2018	Circles	Ananya Birla	Vocal Producer, Engineer
2018	Sadness feat. Chloe Campbell	Black Summer	Vocal Producer, Engineer, Mixing
2018	Maula	Farhan Saeed feat. Rishi Rich	Mixing
2018	Battle	David Guetta	Vocal Producer, Engineer
2018	Drive	David Guetta	Engineer
2018	No Brainer	DJ Khaled feat. Justin Bieber	Engineer
2018	The Sweetener Sessions	Ariana Grande	Engineer
2018	BBC Special	Ariana Grande	Engineer
2018	Jo Tu Na Mila	Asim Azhar	Vocal Producer, Engineer, Mixing
2018	Soneya	Rupinn	Vocal Producer, Engineer, Mixing
2018	Kick You Out	Loren Gray	Vocal Producer, Engineer
2018	Queen	Loren Gray	Vocal Producer, Engineer
2018	James Dean	Kevin McHale (actor)	Mixing
2018	Goodbye	David Guetta	Engineer
2018	You Love Me You Care	Tallia Storm	Engineer
2018	World On A Slope	Tallia Storm	Engineer
2018	It's The GC	Tallia Storm	Vocal Producer, Engineer
2019	Big Dreams ft. Skrizzy	Black Summer	Vocal Producer, Mixing
2019	Double Edge ft. ASTON	Black Summer	Vocal Producer, Mixing
2019	Blackout	Ananya Birla	Vocal Producer, Engineer
2019	Better	Ananya Birla	Vocal Producer, Engineer
2019	Unstoppable	Ananya Birla	Vocal Producer, Engineer
2019	Disappear	Ananya Birla	Vocal Producer, Engineer
2019	Day Goes By feat Sean Kingston	Ananya Birla	Vocal Producer, Mixing
2019	Good Time	Niko Moon	Vocal Producer, Engineer
2019	Way Back	Niko Moon	Vocal Producer, Engineer
2019	Can't Do It	Loren Gray	Vocal Producer, Engineer
2019	Anti Everything	Loren Gray	Vocal Producer, Engineer
2019	Ring Ring Ring	Tallia Storm	Engineer
2019	Needy Gemini	Tallia Storm	Engineer
2019	Royalty	Tallia Storm	Engineer
2019	On My Way	Alan Walker	Engineer
2019	Evapora feat Iza & Major Lazer	Ciara	Vocal Producer
2019	Don't Check On Me feat. Chris Brown, Justin Bieber & Ink	Justin Bieber	Engineer
2019	10,000 Hours	Justin Bieber & Dan + Shay	Engineer
2019	Rock Ya Body	Phoinix Keyz	Engineer
2019	Live Fast	Alan Walker	Vocal Producer, Engineer
2019	Snowman	Madden	Engineer
2019	I Don't Care	Justin Bieber & Ed Sheeran	Engineer
2019	Bad Guy Remix	Justin Bieber & Billie Eilish	Engineer
2019	Always and Never	Zac Brown	Engineer
2019	Dream Sellin’	Zac Brown	Engineer
2019	Nowhere Left To Go	Zac Brown	Engineer
2019	Nai Chaida	Lisa Mishra	Vocal Production & Mixing
2019	Let Me In	Starley	Vocal Production & Mixing
2020	Chills	Asher Angel	Vocal Producer, Engineer
2020	Guilty	Asher Angel	Vocal Producer, Mixer
2020	Drown	John Legend	Vocal Producer
2020	Arms Around Me	Starley	Vocal Producer, Mixer
2020	One of One	Starley	Vocal Producer, Mixer
2020	Cheap Sunglasses	john K	Vocal Producer
2020	Right Where We Belong	john K	Vocal Producer
2020	Love Myself from the motion picture The High Note	Tracee Ellis Ross	Vocal Producer, Engineer
2020	Bad Girl from the motion picture The High Note	Tracee Ellis Ross	Vocal Producer, Engineer
2020	Stop For a Minute from the motion picture The High Note	Tracee Ellis Ross	Vocal Producer, Engineer
2020	Chemistry from the motion picture The High Note	Tracee Ellis Ross	Vocal Producer, Engineer
2020	Best Of My Love from the motion picture The High Note	Tracee Ellis Ross	Vocal Producer, Engineer
2020	Track 8 from the motion picture The High Note	Tracee Ellis Ross	Vocal Producer, Engineer
2020	Let's Stay Together from the motion picture The High Note	Tracee Ellis Ross	Vocal Producer, Engineer
2020	Like I Do from the motion picture The High Note	Tracee Ellis Ross	Vocal Producer, Engineer
2020	You Send Me from the motion picture The High Note	Tracee Ellis Ross	Vocal Producer, Engineer
2020	New To Me from the motion picture The High Note	Tracee Ellis Ross	Vocal Producer, Engineer
2020	Just Breathe	David Archuleta	Mixing
2020	The Good In The Bad	David Archuleta	Mixing
2020	Becky	Aminé	Engineer
2020	Compensating	Aminé	Engineer
2020	Everybody's Lost	Ananya Birla	Vocal Producer, Mixer
2020	O Soneya	Asim Azhar	Vocal Producer, Engineer, Mixer
2020	Lost	12 AM	Mixer
2020	Tu PAPÁS	Mau y Ricky	Engineer
2020	Something Special ft. Kehlani	Pop Smoke	Engineer
2020	Fallin For You	Jaden Smith & Justin Bieber	Engineer
2020	Man On The Moon	Alan Walker	Vocal Producer
2020	Over You	Jacob Sartorius	Engineer
2020	All Around Me	Justin Bieber	Engineer, Vocal Tuner
2020	Habitual	Justin Bieber	Engineer, Vocal Tuner
2020	Come Around Me	Justin Bieber	Engineer, Vocal Tuner
2020	Intentions feat. Quavo	Justin Bieber	Engineer, Vocal Tuner
2020	Yummy	Justin Bieber	Engineer, Vocal Tuner
2020	Available	Justin Bieber	Engineer, Vocal Tuner
2020	Forever ft. Post Malone	Justin Bieber	Engineer, Vocal Tuner
2020	Running Over ft. Lil Dicky	Justin Bieber	Engineer, Vocal Tuner
2020	Take It Out On Me	Justin Bieber	Engineer, Vocal Tuner
2020	Second Emotion ft. Travis Scott	Justin Bieber	Engineer, Vocal Tuner
2020	Get Me ft. Kehlani	Justin Bieber	Engineer, Vocal Tuner
2020	ETA	Justin Bieber	Engineer, Vocal Tuner
2020	Changes	Justin Bieber	Engineer, Vocal Tuner
2020	Confirmation	Justin Bieber	Engineer, Vocal Tuner
2020	That's What Love Is	Justin Bieber	Engineer, Vocal Tuner
2020	At Least For Now	Justin Bieber	Engineer, Vocal Tuner
2020	Intentions Acoustic	Justin Bieber	Engineer, Vocal Tuner
2020	Yummy (Summer Walker Remix)	Justin Bieber	Engineer, Vocal Tuner
2020	Stuck With U ft. Ariana Grande	Justin Bieber	Engineer, Vocal Tuner
2020	Holy	Justin Bieber	Engineer, Vocal Tuner
2020	Lonely with Benny Blanco	Justin Bieber	Vocal Producer, Engineer
2020	Monster with Shawn Mendes	Justin Bieber	Engineer, Vocal Tuner
2020	Anyone	Justin Bieber	Engineer, Vocal Tuner
2020	Hold On	Justin Bieber	Engineer, Vocal Tuner
2021	I'm Alive" from the motion picture Infinite	Asia Fuqua	Vocal Producer
2021	The Ex	Avi Angel	Vocal Producer, Mixer
2021	Give Me Up	Ananya Birla	Vocal Producer, Mixer
2021	When I'm Alone	Ananya Birla	Vocal Producer, Mixer
2021	Deny Me	Ananya Birla	Vocal Producer, Mixer
2021	Do It Anyway	Ananya Birla	Vocal Producer, Mixer
2021	Hindustani Way	Ananya Birla	Vocal Producer, Mixer
2021	No Pressure (Black Summer Remix)	Asher Angel	Mixer
2021	Sobriety	Jessie Murph	Co-vocal Producer, Engineer
2021	Snowman	Arizona Zervas	Vocal Producer
2021	Nothing With You	John K	Vocal Producer
2021	Fool Alone	John K	Vocal Producer
2021	2 Much	Justin Bieber	Engineer, Vocal Tuner
2021	As I Am ft. Khalid	Justin Bieber	Engineer, Vocal Tuner
2021	Off My Face	Justin Bieber	Engineer, Vocal Tuner
2021	Loved By You ft. Burna Boy	Justin Bieber	Engineer, Vocal Tuner
2021	Wish You Would ft. Quavo	Justin Bieber	Engineer, Vocal Tuner
2021	Know No Better ft. DaBaby	Justin Bieber	Engineer, Vocal Tuner
2021	Red Eye ft. TroyBoi	Justin Bieber	Engineer, Vocal Tuner
2021	Angel's Speak	Justin Bieber	Engineer, Vocal Tuner
2022	Hard Workin Man	The Avila Brothers ft. Snoop Dogg & Billy Ray Cyrus	
2022	No Man's Land	Bella Poarch	Vocal Producer
2022	You Make Me Complete	5 Seconds Of Summer	Vocal Producer
2022	I Just Want Your Touch	Starley & Jolyon Petch	Vocal Producer
2022	Like You	Illy	Vocal Producer/Mixer
2022	Fumes	Jutes	Vocal Producer
2022	Welcome To The West	Mila J	Mixer
2022	Blueprint	Tyla Jane	Mixer
2022	Coffee	Tyla Jane	Mixer
2022	Lemonade	Tyla Jane	Mixer
2022	On 10	Arizona Zervas	Vocal Producer
2022	A Letter To Me	Dixie D'Amelio	Co-Vocal Producer
2022	Model	Dixie D'Amelio	Co-Vocal Producer
2022	Shoulda Known Better	Dixie D'Amelio	Co-Vocal Producer
2022	Bye2You	Dixie D'Amelio	Co-Vocal Producer
2022	Last Words	Dixie D'Amelio	Co-Vocal Producer
2022	Both Ways	Dixie D'Amelio	Co-Vocal Producer
2022	Stuck	Dixie D'Amelio	Co-Vocal Producer
2022	Butterface Tiffany	Miles Wesley	Co-Producer, Vocal Producer, Mixer
2022	Meri Jaan	Asim Azhar	Vocal Producer, Mixer
2022	Habibi	Asim Azhar	Vocal Producer, Mixer
2022	Shut Up	Alan Walker	Vocal Producer
2022	Catch Me If You Can	Alan Walker	Vocal Producer
2022	Lovesick	Alan Walker ft. Sophie Simmons	Vocal Producer
2022	Ritual	Alan Walker	Vocal Producer
2022	Cernunnos	Black Summer	Mixer
2022	Solace	Black Summer	Mixer
2022	Hatingmissingyou	Black Summer	Mixer
2022	Gateway Owl	Black Summer	Mixer
2022	Juno	Black Summer	Mixer
2022	Creepshow	Black Summer	Mixer
2022	Dive	Black Summer	Mixer
2022	Don't Wear Me Down	Black Summer	Mixer
2022	Revolting	Black Summer	Mixer
2022	Taranis	Black Summer	Mixer
2023	Beautiful Love	Justin Bieber	Engineer, Vocal Tuner
2023	Dard	Asim Azhar	Mixer
2023	We Live	Arizona Zervas	Vocal Producer
2023	The Loner	Arizona Zervas	Vocal Producer
2023	West Coast Blues	Arizona Zervas	Vocal Producer
2023	Die In L.A	Hunter Daily	Co-Vocal Producer
2023	Older	Steve Aoki ft. Jimmie Allen & Dixie D'Amelio	Co-Vocal Producer
2023	Better Off Alone	Alan Walker ft. Dash Berlin & Vikkstar	Vocal Producer
2023	Hero	Alan Walker ft. Sasha Alex Sloan	Vocal Producer
2023	Heart Over Mind	Alan Walker ft. Daya	Vocal Producer
2023	Endless Summer	Alan Walker ft. Zak Abel	Vocal Producer
2023	Born To Ride	Alan Walker ft. Sophie Stray	Vocal Producer
2023	Yesterday	Alan Walker ft. Ali Gatie	Vocal Producer
2023	What Happened To Ryan	Jessie Murph	Vocal Producer
2023	Pieces	Vassy	Vocal Producer, Mixer
2023	Krazy	Vassy	Vocal Producer, Mixer
2023	Rockstar	Jourdin Pauline	Mixer
2023	One That I Need	Piez	Mixer
2023	Did It Big	Piez	Vocal Producer
2024	Guilty Pleasure	Jojo Siwa	Vocal Producer, vocal tuning
2024	Thick Of It All	Alan Walker ft. Joe Jonas & Julia Michaels	Vocal Producer
2024	Who I Am	Alan Walker ft. Peder Elias & Putri Ariani	Vocal Producer
2024	End Of The World	Alan Walker ft. Anne Gudrun	Vocal Producer
2024	Barcelona	Alan Walker	Vocal Producer
2024	Beautiful Nightmare	Alan Walker ft. Bludnymph	Vocal Producer
2024	Shameless	Benjamin Elgar	Vocal Producer
2024	Too High	Benjamin Elgar	Vocal Producer
2024	Better Tho	Benjamin Elgar	Vocal Producer
2024	Finally from The Color Purple (2023 film)	Jorja Smith	Vocal Producer
2024	Shadows	Miles Wesley	Co-Producer
2024	Travis Has a Gun	Miles Wesley	Co-Producer
2024	Always	Miles Wesley	Co-Producer
2024	Space	Miles Wesley	Co-Producer
2024	We Don't Shine	Seren Emyr	Mixer
2024	Malefic	Seren Emyr	Mixer
2024	Smut	Seren Emyr	Mixer
2024	Rott	Seren Emyr	Mixer
2024	Decay	Seren Emyr	Mixer
2024	Karmabear	Seren Emyr	Mixer
2024	Deal Victim	Seren Emyr	Mixer
2024	Dot Com	Seren Emyr	Mixer

== Awards and nominations ==
=== Grammy Awards ===
Year	Nominee / work	Award	Result
2009	Mary J. Blige's Growing Pains	Grammy Award for Best Contemporary R&B Album	Won
2011	Katy Perry's Teenage Dream	Grammy Award for Album of the Year	Nominated
2016	Jack Ü feat. Justin Bieber's Where Are Ü Now (single)	Grammy Award for Best Dance Recording	Won
2017	Justin Bieber's Purpose	Grammy Award for Album of the Year	Nominated
2018	Justin Bieber's Despacito	Grammy Award for Record of the Year	Nominated
2019	Chromeo Head Over Heels	Best Engineered Album, Non-Classical	Nominated
2020	Justin Bieber's Changes	Best Pop Vocal Album	Nominated
2020	Justin Bieber's Intentions ft. Quavo	Best Pop Duo/Group Performance	Nominated
2020	Justin Bieber's Yummy	Best Pop Solo Performance	Nominated
2020	Dan + Shay 10,000 Hours ft. Justin Bieber	Best Country Duo/Group Performance	Won
2021	Justin Bieber's Justice	Album Of The Year	Nominated
2021	Justin Bieber's Anyone	Best Pop Solo Performance	Nominated
2021	Justin Bieber's Justice	Best Pop Vocal Album	Nominated
2021	Justin Bieber's Lonely ft. benny blanco	Best Pop Duo/Group Performance	Nominated
