= The Little Drummer Boy =

1941 American Christmas song by Katherine Kennicott Davis

"Carol of the Drum"

Song
- Published: 1941
- Genre: Christmas
- Songwriter: Katherine Kennicott Davis

"The Little Drummer Boy" (originally known as "Carol of the Drum") is a popular Christmas song written by American composer Katherine Kennicott Davis in 1941. First recorded in 1951 by the Austrian Trapp Family, the song was further popularized by a 1958 recording by the Harry Simeone Chorale, which was a Christmastime chart hit through the 1960s and even decades later. Many other artists had chart success with the song, most notably Bing Crosby, who made a solo recording in 1962 as well as a duet medley with David Bowie in 1977.

== Composition ==
Katherine Kennecott Davis wrote "Carol of the Drum" in 1941. She was living in Concord, Massachusetts, when the inspiration came to her during an attempt at napping one afternoon. In a 2024 podcast of Hark! The stories behind our favorite Christmas carols, the guest was Lisa Graham, the director of the choral program and a senior lecturer in music at Wellesley College, Davis's alma mater, who answered questions about the composition that became "The Little Drummer Boy". Host Maggi Van Dorn said, "I have read that it could have been inspired or reminiscent of either a Czech or a French tune. Do you know anything about that?" Graham responded:

I do, and, according to [Davis], neither. It was an original tune in her mind, and I think the mystery about the Czech origin was sort of at her own hand because on a whim, when she published the piece and turned in the manuscript, she wrote that it was based on a Czech carol, an old Czech carol. And it was completely made up because she thought it added a little bit of mystery to it, and she thought maybe it might give it a little more credence than just, say, an original composition.

Davis's interest was in producing material for amateur and girls' choirs: Her manuscript is set as a chorale, in which the tune is in the soprano melody with alto harmony, tenor and bass parts producing the "drum rhythm" and a keyboard accompaniment "for rehearsal only". It is headed "Czech Carol freely transcribed by K.K.D.", these initials then crossed out and replaced with "C.R.W. Robinson", a name under which Davis sometimes published. According to Graham, "She gives the reason that she had published a number of carols under her own name and thought that, well, maybe something different. This might be a little more catchy."

In the lyrics, the singer relates how, as a poor young boy, he was summoned by the Magi to the Nativity of Jesus. Without a gift for the infant, the little drummer boy played his drum with approval from Jesus's mother, Mary, recalling, "I played my best for him" and "He smiled at me". The story of a drummer at the manger is not from the Bible.

== Recording history ==
"Carol of the Drum" appealed to the Austrian Trapp Family Singers, who first brought the song to wider prominence when they recorded it for Decca Records in 1951 on their first album for the label. Their version was credited solely to Davis and published by Belwin-Mills. In 1957, the song was recorded with an altered arrangement by Jack Halloran for his Jack Halloran Singers on their Dot Records album Christmas Is A-Comin'. Dot was supposed to release their recording of "Carol of the Drum" as a single in 1957 but did not.

A producer for Dot, Henry Onorati, had worked on the Halloran recording. He left Dot to become the new head of 20th Century-Fox Records, where he gave the arrangement to Harry Simeone, who hired many of the same singers who had sung in Halloran's version and made a recording very similar to Halloran's with his newly-created Harry Simeone Chorale. The only differences were that Simeone's contained finger cymbals and the song's title had been changed to "The Little Drummer Boy", a name that Davis later said she disliked, describing it as "cutie cute". It was included on Simeone's 1958 album Sing We Now of Christmas, which was retitled The Little Drummer Boy in 1963. (When Halloran's Christmas Is A-Comin' was reissued in 1959, both the album and the "Carol of the Drum" track were also given the song's new title.)

Simeone signed with Kapp Records in 1964 and recorded a new version of the song for his 1965 album O' Bambino – The Little Drummer Boy that ran 3 minutes 18 seconds. It was recorded in stereo, had a slightly slower tempo, and contained different-sounding cymbals. Simeone recorded the song a third and final time in 1981; that recording was for an album again titled The Little Drummer Boy that was on the budget Holiday Records label and had a running time of 3 minutes and 8 seconds.

"The Little Drummer Boy"
- One of US single picture sleeves

Single by Harry Simeone Chorale
- B-side: "Die Lorelei"
- Released: December 1958
- Genre: Christmas; pop
- Length: 3:03
- Label: 20th Fox
- Songwriters: Harry Simeone; Katherine Kennicott Davis; Henry Onorati

Music video
- "The Little Drummer Boy" on YouTube

== Simeone chart success ==
"The Little Drummer Boy" by the Harry Simeone Chorale was released as a single in 1958 and was an enormous success, ranking in the top 40 of Billboard magazine's Hot 100 singles chart from 1958 to 1962. The recording began eight consecutive annual appearances on the Christmas Singles chart when the magazine started ranking holiday songs separately in 1963. The 1965 version began appearing there in 1972.

== Legal dispute ==
Once the Simeone recording became popular, Davis wanted to clarify that she wrote the song, but the publishing company stood firm with her original notation that it was of Czech origin and attempted to find further proof that it was. An agreement was reached out of court in which Davis, Onorati and Simeone would share the royalties from the song. Simeone and Onorati claimed and received joint composition credits with Davis, although the two did not actually compose or arrange it. Because she believed that Simeone and Onorati had done all the work that made the song so popular, she felt that the decision was fair but also felt that what they did was piracy and referred to them as "PIRATES" in capital letters in all written correspondence thereafter. Halloran never received a joint writing credit for the song, something his family disagrees with.

== Aftermath ==
In a 2009 op-ed for The New York Times, Louis W. Thompson wrote, "In later interviews, Katherine Davis seemed dismayed about her creation, saying the song had been ruined by being played too often."

== Original manuscript ==
Katherine Davis died in 1980 and made provisions in her will so that all proceeds and royalties from her music went to the music department at Wellesley. The collection of her manuscripts did not, however, include the one for "Carol of the Drum", which wound up at the auctioneer Sotheby's. The school won the manuscript after bidding $11,000 for it.

== Peace on Earth/Little Drummer Boy ==
In 1977 Bing Crosby and David Bowie recorded a duet medley titled "Peace on Earth/Little Drummer Boy" for what would be Crosby's final holiday TV special (Bing Crosby's Merrie Olde Christmas). In 1982 it reached number 3 on the UK Singles Chart. In 2008, Terry Wogan and Aled Jones recorded a cover for the album Bandaged: With a Little Help from My Friends; after a brief campaign amongst listeners of BBC Radio 2 instigated by DJ Chris Evans to get the song released in support of the Children in Need charity, it was released as a single on 8 December 2008, and also peaked at number 3 on the UK Singles Chart.

== Drummer Boy ==
Justin Bieber released a version of the song with Busta Rhymes simply named "Drummer Boy" on his 2011 Christmas album Under the Mistletoe, adding rap verses. It reached number 86 on the Billboard Hot 100 and number 9 on the magazine's Holiday 100 chart.

== Charts ==
Chart performance for "The Little Drummer Boy" by The Harry Simeone Chorale (1958—1983)
Holiday season	Chart	Peak position
1958	US Billboard Hot 100	13
1959	UK Singles (Official Charts)	13
1959	US Billboard Hot 100	15
1960	US Billboard Hot 100	24
1961	US Billboard Hot 100	22
1961	US Billboard Easy Listening	6
1962	US Billboard Easy Listening	6
1962	US Billboard Hot 100	28
1963	US Billboard Christmas Singles	2
1964	US Billboard Christmas Singles	1
1965	US Billboard Christmas Singles	1
1966	US Billboard Christmas Singles	1
1967	US Billboard Christmas Singles	2
1968	US Billboard Christmas Singles	1
1969	US Billboard Christmas Singles	2
1970	US Billboard Christmas Singles	3
1972	US Billboard Christmas Singles	9
1973	US Billboard Christmas Singles	20
1983	US Billboard Christmas Singles	10

Chart performance for "The Little Drummer Boy" by other artists (1959—2013)
Holiday season	Artist	Chart	Peak position
1959	The Beverley Sisters	UK Singles (Official Charts)	6
1959	Johnny Cash	US Billboard Hot 100	63
1959	Johnny Cash	US Billboard Country	24
1959	Michael Flanders	UK Singles (Official Charts)	20
1961	The Jack Halloran Singers	US Billboard Hot 100	96
1963	Johnny Mathis	US Billboard Christmas Singles	21
1964	Johnny Mathis	US Billboard Christmas Singles	11
1966	Joan Baez	US Billboard Christmas Singles	16
1967	Kenny Burrell	US Billboard Christmas Singles	21
1967	Lou Rawls	US Billboard Christmas Singles	2
1969	Lou Rawls	US Billboard Christmas Singles	5
1972	Royal Scots Dragoon Guards	UK Singles (Official Charts)	13
1981	Boney M.	Germany (Offiziele Deutsche Charts)	20
1993	RuPaul	US Billboard Bubbling Under the Hot 100	113
1998	Restless Heart	US Billboard Country	58
2000	Lonestar	US Billboard Country	46
2010	Wilson Phillips	US Billboard Adult Contemporary	13
2012	Richard Marx	US Billboard Adult Contemporary	7
2013	Pentatonix	Austria (Ö3 Austria Top 40)	8
2013	Pentatonix	Canadian Hot 100 (Billboard)	56
2013	Pentatonix	New Zealand Official New Zealand Music Chart	38
2013	Pentatonix	US Billboard Hot 100	13
2013	Pentatonix	US Billboard Adult Contemporary	27

=== Holiday 100 chart entries ===
Since many radio stations in the US adopt a format change to Christmas music each December, many holiday hits have an annual spike in popularity during the last few weeks of the year and are retired once the season is over. In December 2011, Billboard began a Holiday Songs chart with 50 positions that monitors the last five weeks of each year to "rank the top holiday hits of all eras using the same methodology as the Hot 100, blending streaming, airplay, and sales data", and in 2013 the number of positions on the chart was doubled, resulting in the Holiday 100. Recordings of "The Little Drummer Boy" have made appearances on the Holiday 100 and are noted below according to the holiday season in which they charted there.

Holiday 100 chart performance for "The Little Drummer Boy" (2011—2025)
Holiday season	Peak chart positions		
Holiday season	The Harry Simeone Chorale	Pentatonix	Bing Crosby
2011	25	—	—
2012	28	—	—
2013	35	1	—
2014	66	30	—
2015	47	92	—
2016	69	86	—
2017	81	67	—
2018	83	78	46
2019	88	84	46
2020	—	62	62
2021	—	91	81
2022	—	100	79
2023	—	88	90
2024	—	—	89
2025	—	—	76

== Notable cover versions ==
Other renditions of "The Little Drummer Boy" have been mentioned in reviews and other articles. AllMusic's Stanton Swihart wrote of the Ray Conniff 1962 album We Wish You a Merry Christmas, "The Singers effortlessly pull off intricate rounds … and glorious harmonies throughout that seem tailor-made for tunes such as 'The Little Drummer Boy'." Robert Christgau reviewed the 1981 Joan Jett and the Blackhearts album I Love Rock 'n Roll for The Village Voice, writing, "Covering the Dave Clark Five and 'Little Drummer Boy' on the same side is a great schlock yea-saying move, but a move is all it is--makes me want to hear the originals rather than play the side again." Ken Lieck reviewed Ringo Starr's 1999 album I Wanna Be Santa Claus and described his cover as a "right-on rockin' version". Norwegian electronic musician Hans-Peter Lindstrøm recorded a 42-minute version of the song in 2009. In 2019, The Guardian placed it at number 20 on their list of the 50 greatest Christmas songs. J. J. Francesco of New Release Today reviewed For King & Country's 2020 album A Drummer Boy Christmas and described it as "themed after their signature rendition of the classic carol".

=== Billboard reviews ===
Various versions of "The Little Drummer Boy" have been praised by the editors of Billboard in reviews of the albums or singles on which they appear. In 1960, Stella Stevens recorded it for a single, which the editors gave three stars. In 1962, it was included on the list of songs that created a "pleasant mixture" on the Roger Wagner Chorale's album It Came Upon a Midnight Clear. In 1963, they categorized the rendition on The Andy Williams Christmas Album as one of the "best tracks" on the LP. Bert Kaempfert and His Orchestra recorded the song that year as a single, which the editors gave four stars. Reviewing Eddie Fisher's 1965 album Mary Christmas, they wrote that "The Little Drummer Boy" was one of the songs that "capture all the joy and happiness of the festive season". They reviewed four releases that included a cover in 1966, including Christmas Is … by Percy Faith, His Orchestra and Chorus; the editors included "The Little Drummer Boy" on their list of "winners" on the album. They described the recording on My Christmas Dream by Sonny James as "second to none" and a cover on the reissue of The 4 Seasons Greetings that year as "exciting". Lena Horne's on Merry from Lena was hailed as a "tender rendition".

The song was "the best of the traditional cuts" on Stevie Wonder's 1967 album Someday at Christmas. Another 1967 track, this time from the Midnight String Quartet album Christmas Rhapsodies for Young Lovers, was described as "a bright interpretation". Two reviews of albums from 1968 included praise for the song: it was noted as a "holiday treat" on The David Rose Christmas Album. Also, the Living Strings & Living Voices gave an "exceptional interpretation" on their album White Christmas. Three albums from 1970 had notable renditions. In critiquing José Feliciano's Feliz Navidad album, they wrote, "Feliciano adds interesting new dimensions to old Christmas favorites like, … 'Little Drummer Boy'." Charley Pride's recording on Christmas in My Home Town was described as a "first rate treatment". Regarding the Jackson 5 Christmas Album, they wrote that "the boys come on strong with their unique treatments of" several songs, one of which was "The Little Drummer Boy".

=== Cash Box reviews ===
Cash Box magazine editors also highlighted recordings of "The Little Drummer Boy" by various artists, three of which were from 1963. They, too, appreciated the Andy Williams rendition, describing it as one of the songs on the album that had a "lyrical and flavorful reading". They also liked the Bert Kaempfert single and wrote, "A pleasing instrumental rendition of the Yuletide favorite." In their review of We Sing You a Merry Christmas by The Osmond Brothers, they wrote that the group was "at their best" on several songs, one of which was "The Little Drummer Boy". Four albums from 1964 also received high marks for covering it. The editors called it a "Yule delighter" on the 12 Songs of Christmas album by Bing Crosby, Frank Sinatra and Fred Waring and one of the "bright bands" on A Merry Christmas by Al Martino. George Greeley recorded "Carol of the Drum" for his album The Best Loved Christmas Piano Concertos, and the editors listed it as one of the songs that contributed to "[l]oads of listening enjoyment". In their review of More Sounds of Christmas by The Ramsey Lewis Trio, they wrote that "The Little Drummer Boy" was one of the songs on which "[t]he group's improvisation is effectively highlighted". Tennessee Ernie Ford's recording was released as a single in 1965, and the editors wrote, "Soft, muted ork and choral backing builds powerfully." Also in 1965, regarding a single by The Crusaders, the editors wrote, "This powerful R&B reading of the while-back venture should conquer all kinds of markets and get lots of spins for the Crusaders."

The 1966 album Christmas Is … by Percy Faith included a recording of it that was "outstanding". On the 1967 album Christmas Carols & Good Gospel by Cleophus Robinson, "The Little Drummer Boy" was "among the stronger efforts". Two 1968 albums elicited comments on the song, one being The Perry Como Christmas Album, on which the singer gave his "usual smooth" performance. The other was The Magic of Christmas by The Soulful Strings, which included a "highly interpretive reading". In addition to the chart hit that Johnny Mathis had with the version from his 1963 album Sounds of Christmas, his second recording for his 1969 album Give Me Your Love for Christmas was recommended by the editors as "a stirring rendition". In 1969, they also reviewed Duke Pearson's Merry Ole Soul album and wrote, "The group's readings of 'Little Drummer Boy' and 'Go Tell It on the Mountain' are outstanding and become much more than seasonal tunes as they are treated here." It was also described as a "highlight" of The Temptations' Christmas Card in 1970. Regarding Hark, The Herald Angels Swing by the World's Greatest Jazz Band of Yank Lawson and Bob Haggart, they wrote, "One of the hardest they tackle is 'Little Drummer Boy', which they interpret with horn and drum power beyond belief."

== Bibliography ==
- Whitburn, Joel (2004), Christmas in the Charts (1920-2004), Record Research Inc., ISBN 0-89820-161-6
