= Drummer Boy (Justin Bieber song) =

Song by Justin Bieber featuring Busta Rhymes

from the album Under the Mistletoe
- Released: October 28, 2011
- Genre: Hip-hop; techno; club; Christmas
- Length: 3:45
- Label: Island; RBMG; Schoolboy
- Songwriters: Katherine Davis; Henry Onorati; Harry Simeone; Justin Bieber; Busta Rhymes
- Producers: Sean K; Kuk Harrell; Justin Bieber

Lyric video
- "Drummer Boy" on YouTube

"Drummer Boy" is a cover of Katherine Davis, Henry Onorati and Harry Simeone's Christmas song "The Little Drummer Boy" by Canadian singer Justin Bieber, featuring American rapper Busta Rhymes, from his second studio album and first Christmas release, Under the Mistletoe (2011). The cover was produced by Bieber himself, alongside Sean K and Kuk Harrell. Leaked days before the album's November 1, 2011 date on October 28, it would later be officially released as the seventh track to Under the Mistletoe, through Island Records, RBMG Records, and Schoolboy Records.

"Drummer Boy" is an uptempo hip-hop techno club track where Bieber sings the original song's lyrics and melody while rapping about himself, poverty and charity. Contemporaneously, the track was met with polarization and confusion from professional music critics, who perceived it as bizarre and silly, and thought that it was bastardizing the meaning of the original song. In later years, the song has been more well-received, with appreciation toward its weirdness, the unlikeliness of a collaboration between Bieber and Rhymes. It has made several best-of lists of Christmas songs by publications such as Billboard, as well as worst-of lists by The Guardian and Time Out London.

Upon its release, the track reached number 89 in Bieber's home country on Billboard's Canadian Hot 100. It also peaked at number 86 on the Billboard Hot 100 in the United States of America, and was a top-ten hit on the U.S. Holiday 100 in the chart's first year, peaking at number 9, its highest position on any chart it made. In 2020, "Drummer Boy" was certified Gold by the Recording Industry Association of America (RIAA) for sales exceeding 500,000 units in the United States. It would also be earned the same certification by Music Canada (MC) for sales exceeding 40,000 units in the country. The song was also promoted through live performances with Rhymes and Tinie Tempah, and was also performed on the series finale of Dancing with the Stars: Juniors (2018).

== Background and release ==
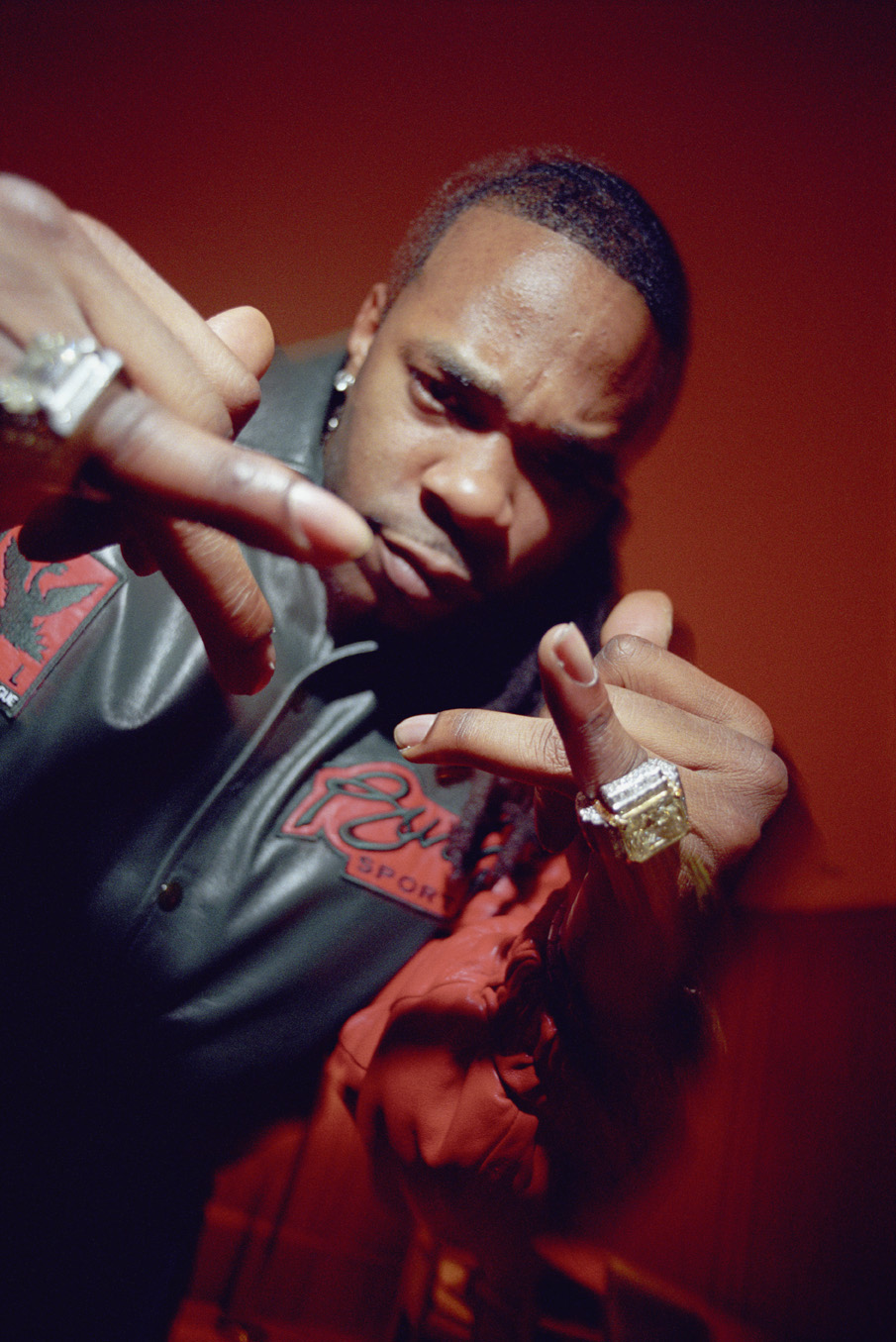
Busta Rhymes in 2002. "Drummer Boy" features added rap verses from him and Bieber.

Months before Believe (2012), a Christmas album by Justin Bieber, Under the Mistletoe (2011), was released on November 1, 2011, and promoted via donations to several charities, such as Make-A-Wish, Pencils of Promise, and a food bank Bieber's family once depended on named Startford House of Blessing. The track list, revealed on October 5, 2011, includes several collaborations, such as a duet cover of "All I Want For Christmas is You" with Mariah Carey, "Fa La La" with Boyz II Men and a duet with his mentor Usher "The Christmas Song (Chestnuts Roasting On an Open Fire)".

Under the Mistletoe also includes a Busta Rhymes-featuring cover of "The Little Drummer Boy", originally written by Katherine Davis, Henry Onorati and Harry Simeone, simply named "Drummer Boy". The track has added rap verses written by Bieber and Busta Rhymes, and was produced by Bieber, Kuk Harrell and Sean K, Harrell also credited as vocal producer. The song had been covered over 220 times, most notably by Bing Crosby but also by Carey, Johnny Cash, The Supremes, Stevie Wonder, and Destiny's Child. "Drummer Boy" is Bieber's third collaboration with a notable rapper, after Ludacris with "Baby" and Kanye West and Raekwon with a remix of the My World 2.0 (2010) cut "Runaway Love".

Both "All I Want For Christmas is You" and "Drummer Boy" was leaked on October 28, 2011, only days before the album's release. As part of a November 14, 2011 ITV1 special promoting the album, Bieber performed the rendition with British rapper Tinie Tempah, which was promoted on Twitter by both artists. On November 30, 2011, Busta Rhymes and Bieber performed "Drummer Boy" as part of the annual Rockefeller Center Christmas Tree Lighting Ceremony. Bieber and Busta Rhymes also lip-synced to "Drummer Boy" as part of the NBA's Christmas Opening Day on December 25, 2011. On November 15, 2011, John Waters was reported rapping "Playing for the king / Playing for the title / I'm surprised you didn't hear this in the Bible" expressing admiration for Bieber's album, while leaving the Museum of Modern Art event "Tribute to Pedro Almodóvar" on a subway.

== Composition ==
"Drummer Boy"
A sample of the end of Bieber's first rap verse, where he brags about it not being in the Bible and comparing himself to Michael Jackson, and a repeat of the original melody of "The Little Drummer Boy", both performed by Justin Bieber over a hip-hop club instrumental.

"Drummer Boy" is an uptempo synthesizer-heavy hip-hop techno club track driven by a "thumping dance beat". Bieber raps on "Drummer Boy", part of his experimentation with different styles on Under the Mistletoe, as well as plays drums. "Drummer Boy" alternates between Bieber singing the lyrics of "The Little Drummer Boy" and rap verses. Bieber's first rap verse involves him bragging about himself and his skills, analogizing them as Biblical and comparable to Michael Jackson: "Playin for the king, playin for the title, / I'm surprised you didn't hear this in the Bible. / I'm so tight, I might go psycho. / Christmas time so here's a recital. / I'm so bad like Michael, I know I'm still young but I go I go." His second deals with poverty and charity, recommending that "It's about time for you to act merrily / It's about time for you to give to charity". Busta Rhymes' verse is about "exchanging Twitter messages with Mr. Bieber at the holiday dinner table". Analyzed Nate Jones of People, in repeats of "The Little Drummer Boy" melody, "[Bieber] shoots the notes sky-high and rides them down on a shuttle of Mariah Carey melisma."

== Commercial performance ==
"Drummer Boy" debuted at number two on the U.S. Holiday Digital Song Sales chart on the week of November 19, 2011, the same week the Bieber and Carey duet topped the chart. It then landed on the all-format Holiday 100 at number nine on the week of December 28, 2011, in the chart's first year and the same week Under the Mistletoe's title track and lead single went to number one. The same week, "Drummer Boy" re-entered at number 86 on the chart's all-genre all-format Hot 100, debuting on an earlier week at number 99. As of December 16, 2022, the song has had 23 weeks on the Holiday Digital Songs Sales chart. On June 25, 2020, the Recording Industry Association of America certified "Drummer Boy" gold for sales exceeding 500,000 units.

== Critical reception ==
=== Contemporaneous ===
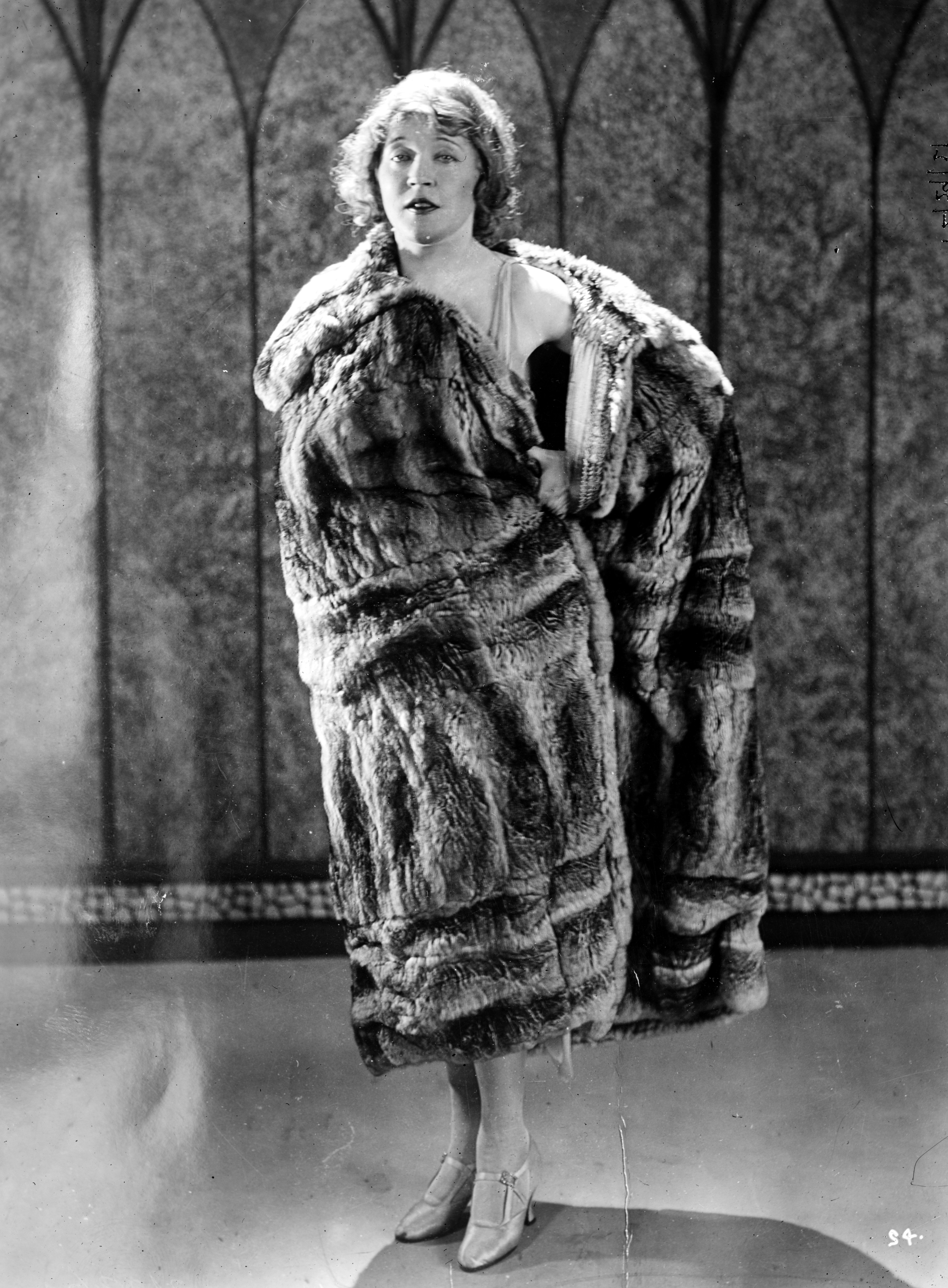
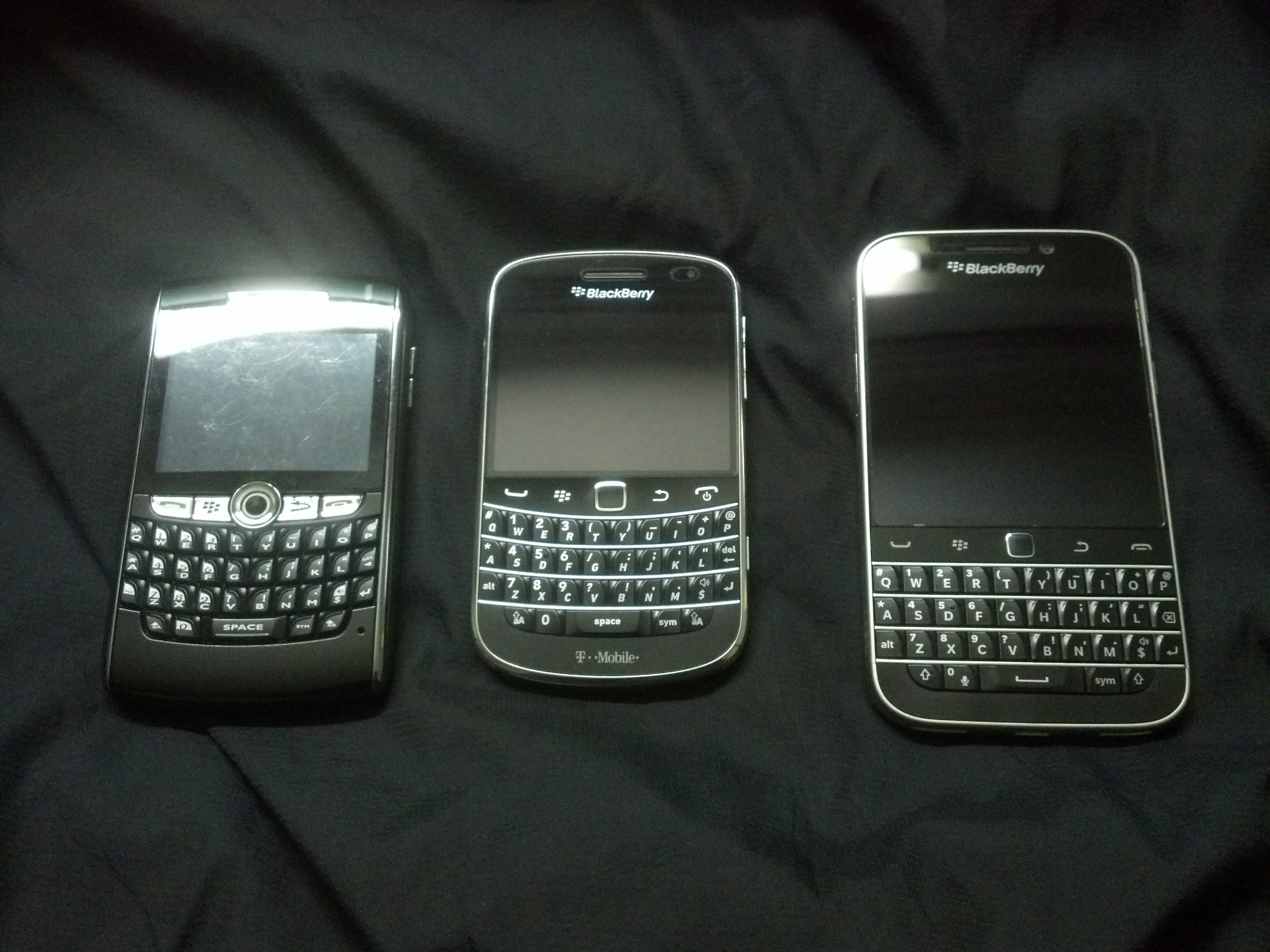
"Drummer Boy" includes lyrical references to elements of popular culture Chinchilla coats (left) and BlackBerry phones (right), which some reviewers felt they and the modern music genre bastardized the song's original meaning.

"Drummer Boy" was met with polarization and mystification from reviewers upon its release; critics called it a "a goofy modernized spin", "confusing", weird, and "as awkward as it sounds, but at least it's different". The staff at Idolator expressed themselves speechless, questioning "Seriously, is this genius? Is this ridiculous? We’re really not sure. [...] In the meantime, we'll be listening to this another 20 times." As Matt Stopera of BuzzFeed summarized his opinion, "I can't even handle this. It's just too much." Entertainment Weekly found it Under the Mistletoe's worst track, complaining that "Bieber spits some of the looniest white-boy rhymes off the shores of Lonely Island", citing the example, "I'm so tight I might go psycho/Christmas time, so here's a recital." Washington City Paper's Brooke Hatfield called Bieber's performance "unremarkable at best", and disliked Bieber's sustain of the last use of "pum" of every verse as lasting "about seventeen syllables long on several occasions".

Some reviewers, however, supported the track, even those who were underwhelmed by the album. The Seattle Post-Intelligencer praised the song as "satisfyingly over the top" and "flipped and tossed in a way never imagined before", highlighting the performances of Bieber and Busta Rhymes: "both Bieber and Rhymes spark such creative surges within each other that it makes one wonder why they did not collaborate on this song sooner." Busta Rhymes' contribution was well received by The Guardian's Caroline Sullivan, who generally found the guest stars the "saving grace" of the album, as a "raucous flow". Randy Lewis, a writer for the Los Angeles Times positively commented that the song "injects some adrenalin into that war horse" of an album of "head-scratching fare", and the Financial Times journalist Ludovic Hunter-Tilney claimed "Bieber strikes gold with his bonkers version of 'Drummer Boy' when he goes all B-boy with rapping, Timbaland-style beats and a yo-yo-yo’ing cameo from Busta Rhymes."

As an album by a Christian teenage artist, Under the Mistletoe lyrics received criticism for questionable lyrics, the title track and "Mistletoe" being the most commonly brought-up examples. Some critics felt "Drummer Boy"'s modern music genre and incorporation of references to non-Christian holidays and pop culture, such as Chinchilla coats, Twitter, and BlackBerry phones, bastardized the source material's meaning and message. As Hatfield described, "Replace the Magi with Usher and the baby Jesus with the Internet and you have a pretty accurate representation of why culture wars are fought." Bieber's pleas of giving to charity was appreciated by some reviewers, including Tris McCall of Inside Jersey, reasoning, "Tennyson he is not, but you can tell the kid means it." Others, as Brian Kirk of the Washington Post summarized, found it insincere, only "encouraging his teen listeners to change the world by giving a can of food". Kirk disagreed with the complaints; he felt that the spirit of the song matched that of the story of the holiday standard, which was about a boy being encouraged by Mary to give a gift however small. As he analysed, "Bieber does the same. He draws in his teen audience with a catchy beat and fun lyrics but then hooks us finally with a call to do what we can to help those in need, even as we are surrounded by the excesses of the holiday season."

=== Retrospective ===
In later years, some publications have claimed "Drummer Boy" to be one of the best all-time Christmas songs. It was ranked 110 on a 2021 list by Parade, and 39 in a piece by Good Housekeeping. Dianna Shen of L'Officiel called it one of the best all-time covers of a Holiday staple. Both she and Good Housekeeping journalists Juliana Labianca and Yaa Bofah favourably labelled the track an "absolute" and "certifiable bop", Labianca and Bofah motivated by its message. The Skinny equivalently described it as a "hell of a banger", elaborating, "it's got all the vital components that make for an alternative Christmas song – superfluous vocal runs, shit-hot bars ('Playing for the king / playing for the title / I'm surprised you didn't hear this in the Bible') and a Busta Rhymes cameo." In terms of holiday hip-hop tracks, it was one of the top 25 in an unranked list by uDiscoverMusic, and the 12th best by Billboard in 2018, which also claimed it to be the fourth-best Justin Bieber deep cut in 2017. It was reported in 2017 to be one of "the best cheesy Christmas songs" by The Times, alongside Madonna's cover of "Santa Baby".

Out of lists of Christmas songs, The Busta Rhymes-Bieber duet has a reputation of being one of the most unexpected and odd music collaborations of all time, topping People's 2013 list of weirdest holiday duets. Stan Veuger, Senior Fellow of the American Enterprise Institute, placed it at number 21 on his list of "The 21 Greatest Conservative Rap Songs of All Time", citing the song's perceived promotion of private charities over taxation. XXL, in 2017, ranked it the fourth-best collaboration between Bieber and a hip-hop artist, out of 24.

Retrospective critics enjoyed the track's oddball nature and Busta Rhymes' feature. Dan Cairns of The Sunday Times labelled it a "coloratura-crazed take" on the original, Busta Rhymes' presence "knuckle-gnawingly hilarious". Jason Lipshutz called "Drummer Boy" "the wackiest yet most undeniably enjoyable holiday tracks to appear in the past few years". He added, "How can you top a Christmas track that features Busta Bust breathlessly spitting, 'People everywhere and all our Twitter followers/Merry Christmas, Kwanzaa, and happy Hannukkah'? The answer is: you can't." Nate Jones appreciated "that an underage Canadian is duetting with a 39-year-old rapper is the least weird thing about this song" However, he did find Bieber's first verse "oddly egotistical" for a Christmas song, especially with a second verse consisting of "tendentious moralizing". Jones declared Busta "deals with rhymes the way Buster Keaton dealt with trains" and Billboard's Sai Cinequemani celebrated his verse as "amusing" and "rapid-fire". Entertainment Weekly, in 2018, listed it as one of the most ridiculous Christmas rap songs ever, suggesting it was only outed in quality by Rhymes's collaboration with Jim Carrey, "Grinch 2000". Hannah Mylrea of NME, less favourably, found its weirdness a downside, encapsulating that it "was just too bizarre to become the next seasonal anthem". The song was the inspiration for Michelle Rennex's 2021 of "Iconic Modern Christmas Songs Ranked From Nay To Sleigh", published in Junkee, where it ranked last at number 17. In her mixed review, she called it "one of the weirdest Christmas songs ever made", praising the song's "bop"-like beat but panned the rapping.

However, the song's ex post facto critical consensus is not without detractors. Gena Kaufman of Glamour called it "one of the most cringey Christmas tunes of all time". It was listed the ninth worst Christmas song by The Guardian and the sixth-worst by Time Out London, which expressed irritation towards Busta's line "eggnog with a little sprinkle of vanilla' like he's at the till in Starbucks" and suggested the rapper should have known better. The Boston Globe placed "Drummer Boy" in his list of "10 tone-deaf covers of Christmas classics". In it, Isaac Feldberg described it as "a strangely hard-driving blizzard of rum-pa-pum-pum percussion, the Biebs's cringeworthy rapping, and Busta Rhymes imploring us to 'gather round the mistletoe real quick,'" and was infuriated by Bieber's self-aggrandizing rap verses. Maija Kappler, in a 2018 HuffPost retrospective on Under the Mistletoe, despised "Drummer Boy" for its several "unforgivable" elements, citing "the misuse of Busta Rhymes" and "our early-2010s tolerance of white Christian pop stars trying their hand at rap on not one but two different verses". He joked, "The only redeeming element of this song is that it inspired lots of online essays, including one in the Washington City Paper, which included the line: "Rhymes bellowing 'BIEBER, WHAT UP' would make a swell notification noise for when someone you hate text messages you.""

== Usage in Dancing with the Stars: Juniors ==
In the finale of Dancing with the Stars: Juniors (2018), contestant Mackenzie Ziegler and partner Sage Rosen freestyle danced to "Drummer Boy". Judges Mandy Moore, Val Chmerkovskiy and Adam Rippon acclaimed the performance and scored it perfect 10s. Moore called it "incredible" and "absolutely flawless", Chmerkovskiy "awesome" and "the best of all worlds", and Rippon reacted with surprise.

== Personnel ==
Credits are adapted from liner notes

- Justin Bieber – vocals, live drums, producer, songwriter
- Busta Rhymes – rap vocals, songwriter
- Sean K – producer
- Josh Gudwin – recording engineer
- Jesus Garnica – assistant audio mixing
- Kuk Harrell – vocal producer
- Jaycen Joshua – audio mixing
- Miguel Lara – assistant recording engineer
- Chris "Tek" O'Ryan – recording engineer

== Charts ==
Weekly chart performance for "Drummer Boy"
Chart (2011–2012)	Peak position
Canada Hot 100 (Billboard)	89
Mexico Ingles Airplay (Billboard)	44
US Billboard Hot 100	86
US Holiday 100 (Billboard)	9

== Certifications ==
Certifications and sales for "Drummer Boy"
Region	Certification	Certified units/sales
Canada (Music Canada)	Gold	40,000^{‡}
United States (RIAA)	Gold	500,000^{‡}
^{‡} Sales+streaming figures based on certification alone.
