= Bad Intentions =

Bad Intentions may refer to:

- "Bad Intentions" (song), a 2002 song by Dr. Dre
- Bad Intentions (album), a 2012 album by Dappy
- Bad Intentions (EP), a 2014 EP by Niykee Heaton
- Bad Intentions (professional wrestling), a professional wrestling tag team of Giant Bernard and Karl Anderson
