= Listen Up! (Haley Reinhart album) =

Studio album by Haley Reinhart
- Released: May 22, 2012
- Recorded: 2011–12
- Genre: Pop
- Length: 35:36
- Labels: Interscope; 19
- Producers: busbee; Rob Kleiner; Chris DeStefano; Chris Seefried; Rune Westberg; David Hodges; Jason Falkner; Shy Carter; J. Bonilla

Haley Reinhart chronology
American Idol Season 10 Highlights: Haley Reinhart (2011)	Listen Up! (2012)	Better (2016)

Singles from Listen Up!
- 1. "Free" Released: March 20, 2012

Listen Up! is the debut studio album by American singer-songwriter Haley Reinhart. It was released on May 22, 2012, by Interscope Records. The lead single, "Free", was released on March 20, 2012. The album is released in two different versions: the 'Standard Edition' has a total of ten tracks while the 'Deluxe/Walmart Exclusive Edition' has four bonus tracks making it a fourteen-song album. The deluxe edition is currently available on Reinhart's official website and Walmart's Internet site. Haley tweeted that the Walmart Edition and the iTunes Deluxe Edition are the pre-order deluxe version from her website. The album has received critical acclaim upon its release and its songs are featured in several critics' playlists. "Listen Up!" debuted at number 17 on the Billboard 200 chart.

== Single ==
The debut single, "Free", reached number four on the US Billboard Bubbling Under Hot 100 chart, and also number twenty-seven on the US Billboard Adult Pop Songs chart.

== Reception ==
=== Commercial reception ===
The album debuted at number 17 on the Billboard 200, selling 20,000 copies in its first week. In its second week. it placed number 51 on the Billboard 200, selling 8,000 copies. In the third week, it placed at number 96, selling about 5,000 copies. It left the Billboard 200 after a month in release, only to return again a week later. The album has sold 77,000 copies in the US as of April 2016.

=== Critical reception ===
Professional ratings
Review scores
Source	Rating
AllMusic	3.5/5 stars
USA Today	(positive)
Artist Direct	4/5 stars
Spin Magazine	7/10
Entertainment Weekly	B+
The New York Times	(positive)
Seattle Post-Intelligencer	(positive)
People	3/4 stars

The album received positive reviews from music critics upon release. AllMusic's Matt Collar stated "Definitely an ear-grabber, Listen Up! ultimately posits Reinhart as a kind of old-school pinup, a mini-Mariah Carey if she'd grown up listening to a mix of Dusty Springfield, Lisa Stansfield, and En Vogue.", and gave the album a rating of 3.5 stars out of 5. He chose the songs "Oh My!", "Liar" and "Now That You're Here" as highlights. Brian Mansfield from USA Today gave the album a positive review, stating "Listen Up! -- out May 22 -- draws heavily on the neo-soul and girl-group R&B of artists like Adele, Duffy and Amy Winehouse. But Haley puts her distinctive twists on the genre, and fans of the Illinois singer likely will be thrilled with the way Listen Up! turned out." He picked the songs "Free", "Now That You're Here" and "Oh My!" as highlights. Rick Florino of Artist Direct gave the album a rating of 4 stars out of 5, and said "Start listening now because Haley Reinhart has made one of the best debuts of 2012, and she might just help revive a little old soul in the process." Barry Walters from Spin Magazine gave the album a 7/10, stating "Thank Adele for an Idol album with depth. Thank Winehouse for dusty soul. Thank Reinhart for the pipes." Grady Smith of Entertainment Weekly gave the album a "B+" grade, and said "With a voice that flips from belt-clear lilt to throaty belt in an instant, Idol's season 10 growler sounds right at home (although occasionally way overproduced) among the blasting horns on her jazzy debut. The disc's retro sound half is a pure funky delight." John Caramanica from The New York Times gave the album a "B" grade, and said "It’s convincing and fresh. In a sense, this is what Cowell’s “Idol” had long been advocating — a return to standards and classic pop modes. It’s unfashionable and a bit out of touch, and what a smart thing that turns out to be."

== Promotion ==
=== Live performances ===
Reinhart performed the lead single live on the March 22, 2012 episode of American Idol. She sang the song live for 104.3 MYFM New Music Night. She also performed the single for the March 27 episode of 90210, Right after, she performed the song on Fox 5's Good Day New York and appeared on Conan to perform the single on April 24.

== Track listing ==
No.	Title	Writer(s)	Producer(s)	Length
1.	"Oh My!" (featuring B.o.B)	Haley Reinhart; Rob Kleiner; Maureen McDonald; Bobby Ray Simmons, Jr.	Kleiner	2:49
2.	"Free"	busbee; Lucie Silvas	busbee	4:14
3.	"Liar"	Reinhart; Kleiner; Sam Watters	Kleiner	3:24
4.	"Wasted Tears"	Reinhart; busbee; Jonathan Green	busbee	3:15
5.	"Undone"	Reinhart; McDonald; Rune Westberg	Westberg	3:49
6.	"Now That You're Here"	Reinhart; Watters; Chris DeStefano	DeStefano	3:19
7.	"Wonderland"	Reinhart; Chris Seefried	Seefried	3:40
8.	"Keep Coming Back"	Reinhart; Kleiner; Steve McEwan	Kleiner	4:01
9.	"Hit the Ground Runnin'"	Reinhart; Mike Elizondo; Aimée Proal; Trevor Lawrence	busbee	3:43
10.	"Walking on Heaven"	Reinhart; Proal; Elizondo; Lawrence	busbee	3:24

Walmart, iTunes and pre-order deluxe edition
No.	Title	Writer(s)	Produced by	Length
11.	"Follow Me (I'm Right Behind You)"	Reinhart; Kleiner§; McEwan; Jason Falkner	Kleiner; Falkner	3:14
12.	"Spiderweb"	Reinhart; David Hodges; Steven Miller	Hodges	3:27
13.	"What You Don't Know"	Reinhart; busbee; Watters	busbee; J Bonilla	2:58
14.	"Let's Run Away"	Reinhart; Blake Carter; Lauren Christy	Shy Carter	3:31

== Personnel ==
Credits for Listen Up! adapted from Allmusic

- Masooma Ali- project coordinator
- Brian Alvarez- music business affairs
- Neil Avron- mixing
- Jeff Babko- keyboards
- Tunji Balogun- A&R
- Jonathan Berry- guitar
- busbee- drums, engineer, percussion, piano, producer, programming
- David Calderly- art direction
- Fiona Dearing- marketing
- Chris DeStefano- arranger, engineer, instrumentation, producer, programing, background vocals
- DJ Mormile- A&R
- Steve Dresser- editor
- John Flaugher- double bass
- Brian Gardner- mastering
- Charlie Gillingham- Hammond B3, strings
- Ainslie Grosser- mixing
- Seth Atkins Horan- engineer
- Victor Indrizzo- drums
- Sam Johnson- trumpet
- Gloria Kaba- assistant engineer
- James King- flute, alto saxophone, baritone saxophone, tenor saxophone
- Rob Kleiner- engineer, producer
- Myles Lewis- A&R
- Ryan Lipman- assistant, mixing engineer
- Steve Lu- strings
- Manny Marroquin- mixing
- Iain Pirie- A&R
- Ginger Ramsey- marketing
- Haley Reinhart- vocals & background vocals
- Harry Reinhart- guitar
- Curt Schneider- bass
- Les Scurry- producer
- Chris Seefried- bass, electronics, Mellotron, percussion, producer
- David E. Smith- saxophone
- Harper Smith- photography
- Jonathan Smith- drums, engineer
- Manny Smith- A&R
- Chris Soper- engineer
- Chris Steffen- drum engineering
- Aaron Sterling- drums
- Calvin Turner- bass
- Rune Westberg- instrumentation, producer
- Ed Woolley- engineer
- Joe Zook- mixing

== Charts ==
Chart (2012)	Peak position
Canadian Albums Chart	52
U.S. Billboard 200	17
