= Milk Music (streaming service) =

Defunct music streaming service

Samsung Milk Music
- Developer: Samsung
- Platforms: Web, Android, Tizen
- Website: milk.samsung.com

Milk Music was a freemium online music streaming service, with music streams and a recommendation engine powered by Slacker Radio, that offered ad-supported free streaming and ad-free subscription streaming services originally meant to compete with Pandora. When first introduced in March 2014, it was first available only as an app for Samsung headsets. In January 2015, Milk Music was made available to everyone as a website.

Samsung began sunsetting Milk Music in September 2016, in the United States and some other markets, and completed its worldwide shutdowns by October 23, 2017. Any installed instance of the app will prompt the user to download Slacker Radio.
