= American Idol Season 10 Highlights: Haley Reinhart =

EP by Haley Reinhart
- Released: June 28, 2011
- Recorded: 2011
- Genres: Rock, Pop
- Length: 19:00
- Label: 19/Interscope Records
- Producers: Jim Jonsin, Don Was

Haley Reinhart chronology
American Idol Season 10 Highlights: Haley Reinhart (2011)	Listen Up! (2012)

American Idol Season 10 Highlights: Haley Reinhart is an EP by Haley Reinhart, an American Idol tenth season finalist, composed of her most successful iTunes songs from her time on American Idol plus an additional recording of You Oughta Know. It was released on June 28, 2011, through 19 Entertainment and Interscope Records exclusively for Walmart.

== Reception ==
Professional ratings
Review scores
Source	Rating
Allmusic	3.5/5 stars

The EP sold 59,000 copies and spent 4 weeks on the Billboard 200 chart in the United States. "House of the Rising Sun" is also the highest rated studio recording from her season with nearly 5000 reviews giving it 5 stars, with "Bennie and the Jets" not too far behind.

Andrew Leahey of AllMusic said the album is "a surprisingly solid appetizer for her full-length debut."

Michael Slezak of TVLine on her "Bennie and the Jets" studio recording: "Cannot. Stop. Playing. On. Repeat. So! Awesome! Grade: A+"

== Track listing ==
No.	Title	Writer(s)	Producer(s)	Length
1.	"House of the Rising Sun"	Alan Price	Don Was	3:22
2.	"Bennie and the Jets"	Elton John, Bernie Taupin	Jim Jonsin	3:18
3.	"Rolling in the Deep"	Adele Adkins, Paul Epworth	Jim Jonsin	3:55
4.	"What Is and What Should Never Be"	Jimmy Page, Robert Plant	Jim Jonsin	4:16
5.	"You Oughta Know"	Glen Ballard, Alanis Morissette	Jim Jonsin	4:09

== Charts ==
Chart (2012)	Peak position
U.S. Billboard 200	37
