= Mistletoe (Justin Bieber song) =

2011 single by Justin Bieber

Single by Justin Bieber

from the album Under the Mistletoe
- Released: October 17, 2011
- Recorded: 2011
- Genre: Pop; R&B; Christmas
- Length: 3:03
- Label: Island; RBMG
- Songwriters: Nasri Atweh; Adam Messinger; Justin Bieber
- Producer: The Messengers

Justin Bieber singles chronology
| "Next to You" (2011) | "Mistletoe" (2011) | "All I Want for Christmas Is You (SuperFestive!)" (2011) |

Music video
- "Mistletoe" on YouTube

"Mistletoe" is a Christmas song by Canadian singer Justin Bieber. The song was written by Bieber and his producers, Nasri Atweh and Adam Messinger. The song was released on October 17, 2011, as the lead single from his second studio album and first Christmas album, Under the Mistletoe (2011). "Mistletoe" is a pop and R&B song, that has reggae influences. "Mistletoe" received generally positive reviews from most music critics. The song reached the top ten in Canada, Denmark, Finland, Sweden, and Norway, and slightly missed the top 10 in the US, peaking at 11, while also reaching the top forty in nine other countries. It set the record for the highest debut for a Christmas song in Billboard Hot 100 history. The song's accompanying music video was directed by Roman White. It features the singer singing on a snowy, lit-up street.

== Background and composition ==
Bieber first premiered the song live on the My World Tour on October 6, 2011, at Olympic Stadium in Rio de Janeiro, Brazil. During the performance, Bieber confirmed that the song would be released on iTunes worldwide on October 17, 2011. In an interview with MTV News, Bieber said, "I'm really excited. [The song is] really catchy. I know all my fans are going to love it. It's something that I feel like they're going to be singing every Christmas."

"Mistletoe" was written and produced by Nasri, and Adam Messinger. It is a Christmas song that is sonically derived from the pop and R&B genres, while making use of reggae elements. and soulful, acoustic R&B. According to the sheet music published at Musicnotes.com by Sony/ATV Music Publishing, "Mistletoe" is set in common time with a "bounce" tempo of 80 beats per minute. It is composed in the key of A major with Bieber's vocal range spanning from the low-note of E_{3} to the high-note of E_{5}. According to many reviewers, the song's production and Bieber's delivery bears much similarity to Jason Mraz's "I'm Yours." Bill Lamb of About.com went as far as to call the song "'I'm Yours' goes Christmas." A Rolling Stone writer commented that "The song basically sounds like a laid-back Jack Johnson number with a bit of overdubbed sleigh bells." The song presents the maturation of Bieber's voice, with RJ Cubarrubia of Billboard writing that he sounded "smooth and intimate." Lamb said "This track marks a distinct move toward a more adult sound on the part of 17 year old Justin Bieber." The song, which includes subtle "Christmas flourishes" in the background arrangement, opens up with jingle bells before an instrumental of guitar and bongos come in.

== Reception ==
=== Critical response ===
RJ Cubarrubia of Billboard first complimented the song, saying that "the stripped-down sound allows the young superstar to showcase how much he and his voice have grown," and that the chorus sounds "warm and fuzzy." However he said "Bieber's breezy crooning and flat lyrics make 'Mistletoe' come off like an uninspiring, Jason Mraz-esque holiday track." Cubarrubia commended Bieber for attempting to inject his charisma in such a track, but said "he's still far from the classic Christmas pop of Mariah Carey's "All I Want for Christmas Is You"." Although he said the song may feel a bit calculated, Bill Lamb of About.com complimented the song's "acoustic Jason Mraz vibe, the subtle seasonal touches, and adult sound. Lamb predicted the song to be a likely seasonal hit for Bieber and commented, "The subtle wintry holiday chimes in the backing track make it obvious this is a seasonal release, but it will not be jarring when included on a standard pop playlist." Jarett Wieselman of The Insider.com said the song "is pretty damn good" and went on to say "it's gonna be the biggest song of 2011." Wieselman said "You can't deny the appeal of America's tween dream du jour dropping a track where he asks the listeners to 'kiss me underneath the mistletoe.' Well played young man, well played."

In 2021, Rolling Stone placed "Mistletoe" at number 17 on its list of the worst Christmas songs of all time. In 2023, The A.V. Club placed the song at number 14 on its own list of the worst Christmas songs of all time.

=== Commercial performance ===
"Mistletoe" sold 164,000 copies in its first week of release, according to Nielsen SoundScan, placing it at No. 5 on Billboard's Hot Digital Songs chart.

As of January 1, 2012, Nielsen SoundScan estimated total sales of the digital track at 722,000 downloads, which is the most a Christmas/holiday digital song has ever sold in a calendar year. As of November 25, 2016, "Mistletoe" is fourth on the list of all-time best-selling Christmas/holiday digital singles in SoundScan history, with total sales of 1,100,000 downloads.

== Music video and live performances ==
The music video for "Mistletoe" was directed by Roman White. The video marked the second time Bieber had worked with White on a music video, the first being "One Less Lonely Girl" (2009). It was also shot in Franklin, Tennessee, where the previous video was filmed. On recruiting White to shoot the video, Bieber explained, "Roman can tell a story really well, so we wanted to use him," Bieber explained. "He shot the 'One Less Lonely Girl' video, and I thought he did a great job; he shot the 'You Belong with Me' video with Taylor Swift, and he had a lot of great experience and a lot of great work." A teaser of the video was released on October 11, 2011. The video itself premiered on October 18, 2011. A Rolling Stone reviewer said "the clip is cheesy holiday joy, with the singer courting a cute chick in some idyllic small town decked out with tasteful white lights and a very light dusting of snow."

"Mistletoe" was performed for the first time on October 5, 2011, during a concert in Rio de Janeiro, Brazil. It was also performed at the 2011 MTV Europe Music Awards on November 6, 2011. Bieber performed the song on November 20, 2011, at the 2011 American Music Awards, and on November 10, 2011, at the Bambi Awards and on German X Factor. He performed "Mistletoe" on the semi-final on UK The X Factor. He additionally performed the song on the UK ITV Christmas special This is Justin Bieber which aired on December 10, 2011, with featured guest Tinie Tempah.

== Charts ==
=== Weekly charts ===
| Chart (2011–2025) | Peak position |
|---|---|
| Australia (ARIA) | 13 |
| Austria (Ö3 Austria Top 40) | 12 |
| Belgium (Ultratop 50 Flanders) | 28 |
| Belgium (Ultratop 50 Wallonia) | 40 |
| Canada Hot 100 (Billboard) | 9 |
| Canada AC (Billboard) | 1 |
| Canada CHR/Top 40 (Billboard) | 31 |
| Canada Hot AC (Billboard) | 20 |
| Czech Republic Singles Digital (ČNS IFPI) | 29 |
| Denmark (Tracklisten) | 6 |
| Finland (Suomen virallinen lista) | 9 |
| France (SNEP) | 31 |
| Germany (GfK) | 19 |
| Global 200 (Billboard) | 16 |
| Greece International (IFPI) | 23 |
| Hungary (Rádiós Top 40) | 28 |
| Hungary (Single Top 40) | 16 |
| Hungary (Stream Top 40) | 15 |
| Iceland (Tónlistinn) | 29 |
| Ireland (IRMA) | 16 |
| Italy (FIMI) | 36 |
| Japan Hot 100 (Billboard) | 25 |
| Latvia (LaIPA) | 11 |
| Lithuania (AGATA) | 15 |
| Luxembourg (Billboard) | 14 |
| Netherlands (Single Top 100) | 19 |
| New Zealand (Recorded Music NZ) | 11 |
| Norway (VG-lista) | 2 |
| Philippines Hot 100 (Billboard Philippines) | 18 |
| Poland (Polish Streaming Top 100) | 35 |
| Portugal (AFP) | 19 |
| Scottish Singles Sales (Official Charts) | 24 |
| Singapore (RIAS) | 17 |
| Slovakia Singles Digital (ČNS IFPI) | 21 |
| South Africa (RISA) | 51 |
| South Korea (Circle) | 127 |
| Spain (Promusicae) | 16 |
| Sweden (Sverigetopplistan) | 9 |
| Switzerland (Schweizer Hitparade) | 14 |
| UK Singles (Official Charts) | 21 |
| US Billboard Hot 100 | 11 |
| US Adult Contemporary (Billboard) | 2 |
| US Pop Airplay (Billboard) | 40 |
| US Holiday 100 (Billboard) | 1 |
| US Rolling Stone Top 100 | 86 |
| Vietnam (Vietnam Hot 100) | 62 |

=== Year-end charts ===
| Chart (2011) | Rank |
|---|---|
| Denmark Streaming (Tracklisten) | 40 |

| Chart (2023) | Rank |
|---|---|
| Hungary (Single Top 40) | 71 |

=== All-time charts ===
All-time chart performance for "Mistletoe"
| Chart | Position |
|---|---|
| US Holiday 100 (Billboard) | 17 |

== Certifications ==
| Region | Certification | Certified units/sales |
|---|---|---|
| Australia (ARIA) | 3× Platinum | 210,000^{‡} |
| Brazil (Pro-Música Brasil) | 2× Platinum | 120,000^{‡} |
| Canada (Music Canada) | 7× Platinum | 560,000^{‡} |
| Denmark (IFPI Danmark) | 4× Platinum | 360,000^{‡} |
| Germany (BVMI) | Platinum | 300,000^{‡} |
| Italy (FIMI) | Platinum | 100,000^{‡} |
| New Zealand (RMNZ) | 2× Platinum | 60,000^{‡} |
| Norway (IFPI Norway) | 2× Platinum | 120,000^{‡} |
| Portugal (AFP) | Platinum | 25,000^{‡} |
| South Korea | — | 462,029 |
| Spain (Promusicae) | Gold | 20,000^{‡} |
| United Kingdom (BPI) | 2× Platinum | 1,200,000^{‡} |
| United States (RIAA) | 3× Platinum | 3,000,000^{‡} |
Streaming
| Denmark (IFPI Danmark) | Gold | 50,000^{†} |
| Greece (IFPI Greece) | Gold | 1,000,000^{†} |
^{‡} Sales+streaming figures based on certification alone.^{†} Streaming-only figures based on certification alone.
