= Bad Intentions (EP) =

EP by Niykee Heaton
- Released: September 23, 2014
- Recorded: 2013–14
- Genre: Pop rock; R&B
- Length: 21:48
- Label: Awesomeness; All Def Digital

Bad Intentions is the debut extended play (EP) by American singer-songwriter Niykee Heaton. It was released on September 23, 2014, in the United States and Canada by All Def Digital in partnership with Awesomeness Music. In 2011, Heaton began recording covers of contemporary pop, R&B, and hip-hop hits and uploading them to YouTube, the clips raised Heaton's profile, helping her gain notice in the music industry. The viral videos lead to numerous meetings with several record labels before signing a deal with Steve Rifkind and Russell Simmons's Capitol-affiliate All Def digital label in 2014.

A contemporary pop and R&B extended play, Bad Intentions takes influence from various music styles, and includes club, ballads, somber and mid-tempos cuts, with lyrics that touch upon themes of relationships with both partners and family members. Upon release, Bad Intentions received mostly positive reviews from music critics, who praised Heaton's vocals adding cohesiveness to the project. The extended play received mild commercial success peaking at number thirty-eight on the US Billboard 200, despite having no physical release.

== Background ==
Niykee Heaton reached the music industry through covers of contemporary pop, R&B, and hip-hop hits, for which she accompanied herself on acoustic guitar, that she started uploading regularly to YouTube in 2011. Near the end of the following year, her version of rapper Chief Keef's "Love Sosa" went viral, leading Heaton to take meetings with several record labels but opting to take a step back and build "a catalog that we were proud of" with her manager Lauren. She eventually signed a deal with Steve Rifkind and Russell Simmons's Capitol-affiliate All Def label in 2014, Awesomeness Music, focused on producing "content catering to the YouTube audience, for talent with a following online."

In an interview talking about the project, Heaton said: "People know me for singing "Love Sosa" on guitar, which is great because they know me for doing something weird and different, but it's important they know me for more than just my YouTube covers – that they can come for the Chief Keef and 2 Chainz covers but they can also see 'she has original music too,' so it's really important that people know me as a songwriter, and a musician, something more than just a YouTube artist." "I think the reason I'm here is because I never tried to be where I am; we didn't construct this image or plan of attack. [My manager and I] have always said, let's just be honest. Let's just show people who we are and make the kind of music that we like. That's why I think my fans recognize what's real,” she elaborated on her style. Heaton designed the Bad Intentions cover art herself: "I made my cover on my MacBook you know. That's authentic. I put a professional photo on Instagram once and I was like 'what is this?!' My fans know me for my selfies so why not stay true to that."

== Composition ==
Heaton regularly expresses the value of songwriting to her as an artist, "My music is a direct reflection of who I am. My writing is everything to me because that’s all I had growing up." "If I had had this happy wonderful life, I wouldn’t have anything to write about and I wouldn’t be where I am now," she refers to a lonely and tough childhood after dealing with the death of a sibling at a very young age and an alcoholic father. "I had to raise myself from age 5, that’s always made me very isolated but also very independent." "Each song is a piece of my life," she continues detailing the themes behind the EP's track list: "'Sober' is about my father. Both of my parents were raging alcoholics, and my father still is and my sister's dying wish was, 'Dad, can you please get sober?' (...) The fact that he couldn't do it, and that it was his own inner demons and it wasn't about her. (...) I wrote this song, literally, from my father’s point of view."

Meanwhile, "Rolling Stone" sees Heaton addressing past relationships, "about finding that someone who can look past all the faults and flaws in you." The meaning behind "Champagne" is "the act of substituting the loss or pain of something with another, more destructive replacement," while the EP's title track is about her "own internal struggle about loving someone else and letting them love me back." "Skin Tight," marks an up-beat transition being described by critics as a "classic love song" with its charming quality relying on the simplicity of its lyrics. Regarding the final song "Villa," Heaton specifies: "It's a Summer party song and I really do love it, because even though I'm a complete nerd and all I do is like read poetry books by myself all day, when I do turn up, I want to do it in a villa in the south of France." "Those emotions are so genuine and so that’s why each song isn't the same mood," she discusses explaining the variety between the songs, ranging from "club bangers" to classic pop ballads to somber and mid-tempo cuts, likewise noted frequently by reviewers, who compliment "Heaton’s signature vocals somehow manage to make them all into a cohesive whole."

== Release ==
Heaton's debut music release Bad Intentions was preceded by the premiere of the title track, with an accompanying lyric video featuring black and white footage of Heaton in a recording studio, back in late January 2014. On August 29, 2014, BuzzFeed premiered an acoustic version of "Sober." The extended play was officially released on September 23, 2014, in the United States and Canada. It topped the Billboard + Twitter Trending 140 chart and quickly reached the top ten in the U.S. iTunes Store. It charted at number thirty-eight on the US Billboard 200 for the week ending October 11, 2014, despite peaking at number seventeen on its digital sales-only based version. The project did not receive a physical nor an international release. The day before the release, the extended play became available for streaming on Heaton's SoundCloud account. Teaser visuals were also premiered earlier in that same month.

Heaton performed at an event by Samsung's Milk Music and All Def Digital's ADD52 on July 10, 2014, in Brooklyn, and at Russell Simmons' 15th Annual Art For Life Gala on July 26, 2014, in New York City, followed by listening parties at Soho House with Simmons and at the Samsung Screening Room in Los Angeles. In October 2014, lyric videos for the tracks "Sober" and "Champagne" were also revealed online. The lack of a bigger mainstream promotional schedule leading up to the release was said to be a strategy by her label All Def Digital, who opted to rely entirely on "persistent self-promotion on social accounts by Heaton and her manager." "We didn't expect it to get as big as it did. We had no promotion dollars behind it. It was just me and my manager, Lauren, pushing it. The fact that it debuted on iTunes and got to number six on the charts blew my mind," Heaton reflected after the release.

In April 2015, Heaton posted an open letter online expressing frustration with her label adding that she wasn't proud of her Bad Intentions EP that had dropped seven months prior, "They wanted me to change the way that I looked, the way that I acted, the way I sang, the words I wrote, who I was as an artist, but also who I was as a person. And I couldn't do that. The creation of my EP under these circumstances was a strenuous and very difficult task. My label wanted to take away my creative control and identity, and exercised their plan relentlessly, until finally, I had no choice but to compromise. And in turn, I was forced to put out a project that I wasn't even proud of." Later, in another interview, Heaton claimed she and her manager were "no longer tied to the people that were holding me back."

== Critical reception ==
Professional ratings
Review scores
Source	Rating
AllMusic	2.5/5 stars
The Hoya	4/5 stars

Bad Intentions received mostly positive reviews from music critics. AllMusic editor Andy Kellman stated about the EP: "there's more depth than what's indicated by the presentation and lyrics like "Cristal float like the Riviera"," and that the songs "switch between heavy-lidded grooves and strummy, middle-of-the-road contemporary pop. Most of them blur into one another like selections from a second-tier soundtrack, but they do suggest some potential." Jasmine White of The Hoya gave Bad Intentions four out of five stars saying "soft and sultry with a hint of gravel, Heaton's voice remains hypnotic throughout the entirety of her debut EP." White drew comparisons between the track "Champagne" to "something on a Drake or The Weeknd album," noting its title track "ironically the weakest" but is "somewhat salvaged by Heaton’s emotional vocals," and concluded "while the EP is not without its faults, Heaton still displays a certain level of artistry and mastery of performance that separates her from the myriad of wannabe pop stars." Mile High Music commented that the project "most certainly removed any skepticism" held regarding Heaton's singing ability, and that the YouTube covers responsible for her success "don't come close in comparison to any track on this project." Sean Gavin of The Daily Dose also praising Heaton's vocals and additionally picked the title track and "Rolling Stone" as standouts.

Mike Wass of Idolator called it an "excellent debut" adding that Heaton "effortlessly jumps from the gut-wrenchingly confessional (...) to bass-heavy party jams," also highlighting "Rolling Stone" describing it as a "a folk-tinged, mid-tempo ballad, showcases the depth the teenager's artistry and somehow manages to be both subtle and ridiculously catchy." In December, the same website listed it as one of the best pop EPs of 2014 mentioning that it "confidently showcases the versatility and scope of Niykee's songwriting." Ryan Kristobak of The Huffington Post wrote, "Heaton's EP offers a significant variety for a debut, all held together by her vocals, most ravishing in her lower register."

== Track listing ==
No.	Title	Composer(s)	Length
1.	"Sober"	Nicolet Heaton; Michael Keenan; Emily Warren	3:47
2.	"Champagne"	Heaton; Nick Bailey; Ryan Ogren; Warren	4:11
3.	"Bad Intentions"	Heaton; Geoffrey Early; Jeremy McArthur	3:18
4.	"Skin Tight"	Heaton; Tommy Tysper; Warren	3:28
5.	"Rolling Stone"	Heaton; Curtis Austin; Andre Harris; Mansur Zafr	4:02
6.	"Villa"	Heaton; Keenan; Rick Markowitz; Warren	3:02
Total length:			21:48

== Charts ==
Chart (2014)	Peak position
US Billboard 200	38
US Digital Albums (Billboard)	17

== Release history ==
Region	Date	Format	Label	Ref.
United States	September 23, 2014	Digital download	Awesomeness Music	
Canada	September 23, 2014	Digital download	Awesomeness Music	
