= Go Tell It on the Mountain =

Go Tell It on the Mountain may refer to:

- "Go Tell It on the Mountain" (song), a Christian spiritual song dating to at least 1865
- Go Tell It on the Mountain (novel), a 1953 novel by James Baldwin
- Go Tell It on the Mountain (film), a 1984 television film based on Baldwin's novel, starring Rosalind Cash
- Go Tell It on the Mountain (album), a 2003 studio album by The Blind Boys of Alabama
