= Niykee Heaton =

American singer (born 1994)

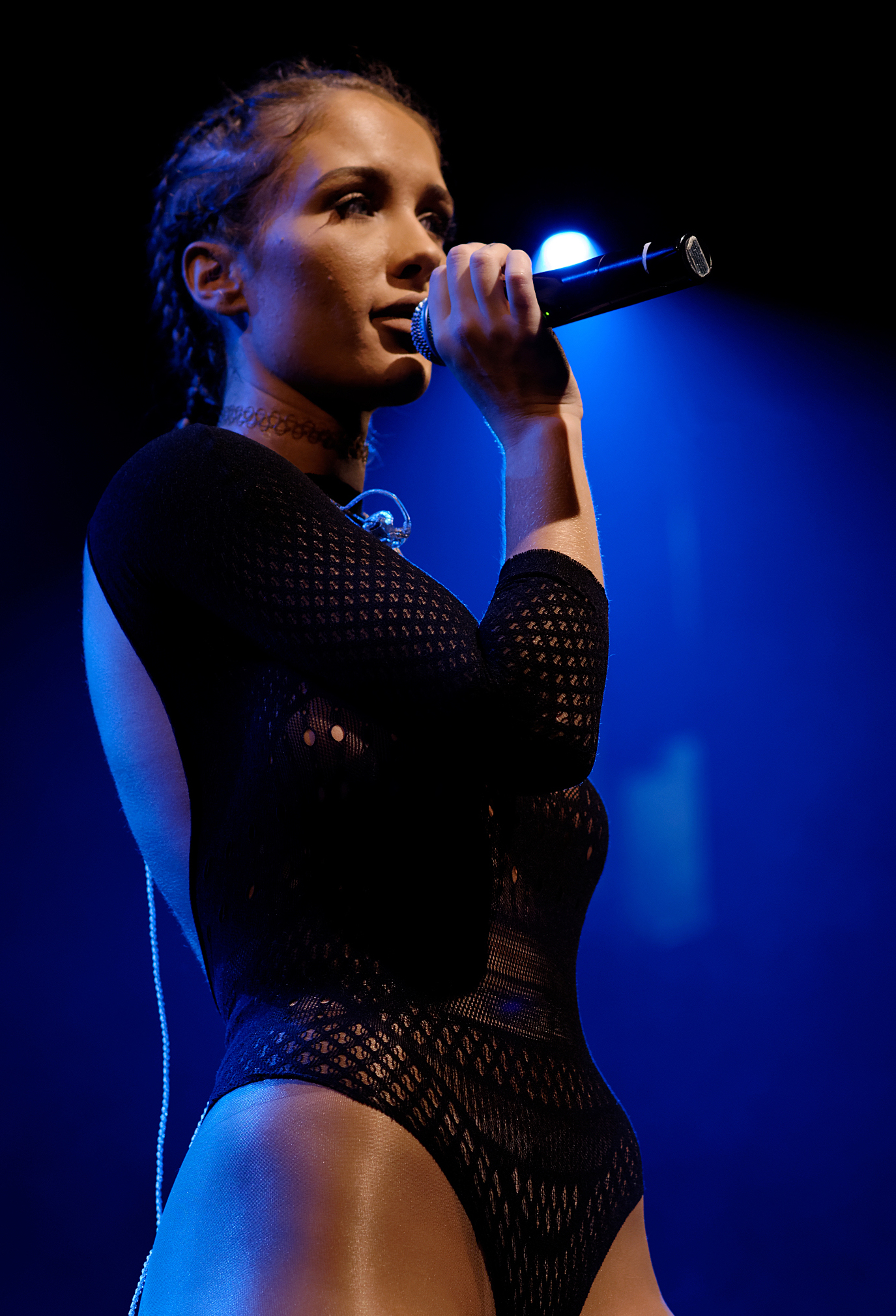
- Niykee Heaton in 2015
- Born: Nicolet Aleta Heaton; December 4, 1994 (age 31); Chicago, Illinois, U.S.
- Occupations: Musician; Singer; Songwriter
- Organization: Naturyl by Niykee
- Spouse: Jeff Logan (m. 2019; div. 2022)
- Children: 2
- Musical career
- Genres: Alternative R&B; acoustic pop
- Instruments: Vocals; guitar; piano
- Years active: 2011–present
- Labels: Independent (current); Capitol; Awesomeness (former)
- Website: niykeeheaton.com

Nicolet Aleta Heaton (born December 4, 1994), known professionally as Niykee Heaton, is an American singer-songwriter. She was discovered through her YouTube channel after uploading acoustic guitar covers of contemporary hits, most notably hip hop songs, that went viral. In 2014, Heaton released her debut single "Bad Intentions" and an extended play of the same name. The single charted on Billboard and became gold-certified by the RIAA.

Heaton embarked on her first headlining concert tour, The Bedroom Tour, in late 2015, and released the similarly titled mixtape, The Bedroom Tour Playlist, in March 2016. The mixtape compiled remastered material she had previously shared online for free streaming and debuted for her live shows during the tour. Her follow-up EP, Starting Over, was released in 2018 through Capitol Records.

== Early life ==
Nicolet Aleta Heaton was born on December 4, 1994, in Chicago, Illinois, and grew up in Geneva, Illinois, but she has noted she has a stronger connection to the time she spent in her mother's South Africa, though she spent little time there. In actuality, she spent most of her time in the aforementioned Geneva, Illinois.

After writing her first song at age five and teaching herself to play guitar at nine, Heaton dedicated her childhood years to making music. Despite realizing early on that she wanted to be a musician, she never saw herself as a performer and just wanted to make music, developing a stage fright. Heaton has an older brother and also had a sister Rachel, who beat liver cancer but died in 2007 at age 21 while waiting for a second liver transplant, whom she regularly notes taking inspiration from.

== Career ==
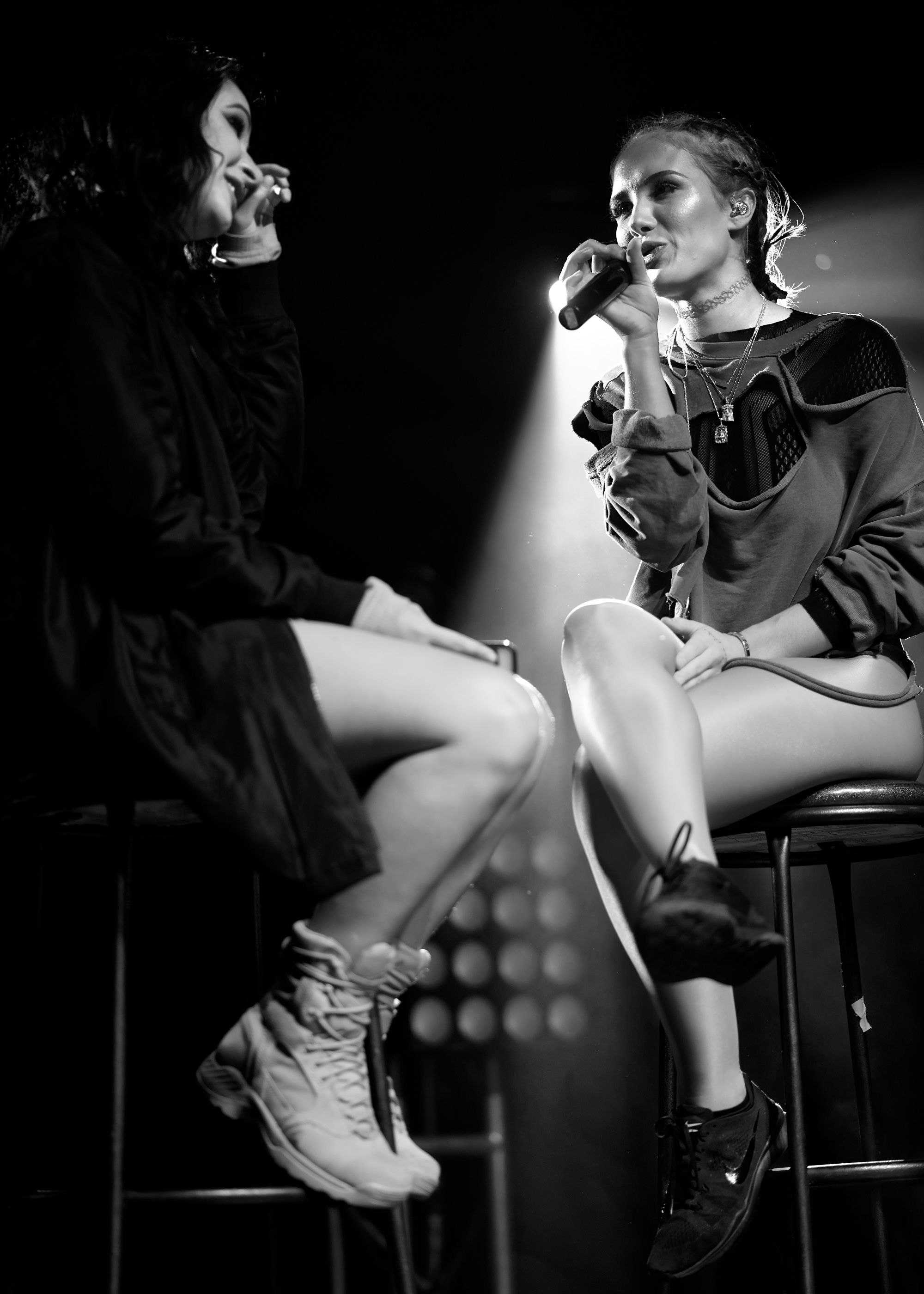
Heaton (right) performing at the El Rey Theatre as part of the Bedroom Tour in 2015

In 2011, while still enrolled in high school, Heaton began uploading clips recorded in her bedroom on YouTube, including covers of contemporary hit songs along with occasional originals, for which she accompanied herself on acoustic guitar. In December 2012, her cover of Chief Keef's "Love Sosa" was featured on the website WorldStarHipHop and Heaton began meeting with record labels. Heaton graduated high school six months early and self-financed the recording of a host of her own songs, opting to take a step back and build "a catalog that we were proud of" with her manager Lauren, eventually signing with All Def Digital in 2014, a YouTube-based label founded by Steve Rifkind and Def Jam-founder Russell Simmons, in partnership with Capitol Records. She topped Billboard's Next Big Sound chart on April 24, 2014.

On September 23, 2014, Heaton released her debut extended play, Bad Intentions, digitally in the United States, topping the Billboard + Twitter Trending 140 chart and reaching the top ten in the U.S. iTunes Store on the day of its release. On April 28, 2015, she posted an open letter online expressing frustration with her label and explaining the delay for her music. On June 13, 2015, she launched a website, NBK (Naturyl Born Killers), stating "NBK is the movement", where new music was then independently released for free regularly in following months. Heaton later clarified, "We are now in a place where we can create music that I want to create, and we are no longer tied to the people that were holding me back", revealing she had started producing music herself as well. On October 20, 2015, she premiered her debut music video for a song titled "Lullaby", on Apple Music. Also in October, Heaton announced her first headlining concert tour, The Bedroom Tour, with twenty dates throughout the United States and Canada, beginning on November 13 in Houston, Texas and concluding on December 18 in Los Angeles, California. On March 18, 2016, Heaton released The Bedroom Tour Playlist, a mixtape titled similarly to the tour, compiling remixed and remastered material she had shared online and debuted on live shows in previous months. In a mid-2016 interview, Heaton announced that she was planning her debut studio album, stating "I want my it to be an actual masterpiece... I want my first album to be legendary". The Centerfold Tour was Heaton's second tour, containing forty-three shows in North America. It began on October 6, 2016, in Athens, Georgia, and ended on December 16, 2016, in Austin, Texas.

== Artistry ==
While talking about her songwriting, Heaton said, "My music is a direct reflection of who I am. My writing is everything to me because that's all I had growing up. I had a really tough childhood and at a point when I was very young, I sort just stopped speaking because I stuttered", mentioning her inability to have friends, causing her to always be alone due to her mother staying with her sister in the hospital, her father being drunk and the rest of her family living in South Africa, so she "would just write all the time." "Even when I'm not writing literally about things that have happened to me, all the pain of my childhood and losing my sister ends up getting pushed into my music", she adds about her creative inspiration and wanting to be proud of the message in her music, "It shapes my songs and builds this deeper meaning under everything, which is one of the most important things to me." She has mentioned being heavily influenced by Bob Dylan and Tom Waits and is also a fan of hip hop, pointing out rappers like Kanye West, 2 Chainz, Jay Z, Drake and Nicki Minaj as other inspirations.

Heaton addressed claims regarding her raunchy social media presence in platforms such as Instagram overshadowing her music saying, "If I can use what I have aesthetically to draw people in, then why not use it? I'm not going to put on a turtleneck just to prove a point, or to make people feel more comfortable according to society's standards." Heaton notes her writing style and musical roots come from growing up with "older siblings who listened to a lot of soul and bluegrass and alternative", and her sister's love of poetry, having discovered rapper Lil Jon when she was ten, which sparked her interest in hip-hop music, describing her sound as "those two worlds colliding, like folk, rhythm, and Shakespeare sonnets mixed with Kanye trap beats."

== Personal life ==
She married actor, model, personal trainer and entrepreneur Jeff Logan on July 14, 2019, and gave birth to their first son on May 1, 2020. Niykee also gave birth to another son named Nikyta Heaton in 2022. Jeff and Niykee separated in the same year.

== Discography ==
=== Studio albums ===
List of extended plays, with selected details and chart positions
Title	Album details
The Lullaby Album	Release: November 15, 2021; Label: Independent; Formats: Digital download, streaming

=== Extended plays ===
List of extended plays, with selected details and chart positions
Title	Album details	Peak chart positions	
Title	Album details	US	US Digital
Bad Intentions	Released: September 23, 2014; Label: Awesomeness Music; Formats: Digital download, streaming	38	17
Starting Over	Released: October 5, 2018; Label: Capitol Records; Formats: Digital download, streaming	–	–

=== Mixtapes ===
List of mixtapes, with selected details and chart positions
Title	Album details	Peak chart positions	
Title	Album details	US	US Digital
The Bedroom Tour Playlist	Released: March 18, 2016; Label: Capitol Records; Formats: Digital download, LP	39	8

=== Singles ===
List of singles, with selected details and chart positions
Title	Year	Peaks		Certifications	Album
Title	Year	US Pop Digital	US Rhythmic	Certifications	Album
"Bad Intentions" (featuring Migos)	2016	28	25	RIAA: Gold; RMNZ: Gold	The Bedroom Tour Playlist

=== Promotional singles ===
List of singles, with selected details and chart positions
Title	Year	Album
"Infinity" (original or Infinity House of Chords remix)	2016	The Bedroom Tour Playlist
"Finally"	2019	TBA
"Go to Sleep Little Baby"	2020	The Lullaby Album
"Renegade"	2020	The Lullaby Album

=== Special releases ===
Title	Year
"Free"	2019
"Set Me Free"	2019
"Won't Stop"	2019
"Check On Me"	2019
"Little Bit"	2019
"Angel in a Centerfold"	2019
"Gimme"	2019
"Young Angeline"	2019
"Next Kill"	2019
"Good Girls"	2019
"Firestarter"	2019
"Dollar Bills"	2019
"Damage"	2019
"Remember It All"	2019

=== Music videos ===
List of music videos, with selected details
Title	Year	Director(s)
"Lullaby"	2015	Niykee Heaton
"Bad Intentions" (featuring Migos)	2016	Daps
"Meicate (Remix)" (unreleased) (with DJ Nomad)	2017	Unknown

== Tours ==
Headlining

- The Bedroom Tour (2015)
- The Centerfold Tour (2016)
