= Under the Mistletoe =

Studio album by Justin Bieber
- Released: November 1, 2011
- Genres: Christmas, pop, synthpop
- Length: 37:51
- Labels: Island; RBMG; Schoolboy
- Producers: Tricky Stewart; Aaron Pearce; The Messengers; Kuk Harrell; Sean K; Bernard Harvey; Josh Cross; Mariah Carey; James "Big Jim" Wright; Randy Jackson; Justin Bieber; Antwan "Amadeus" Thompson; Boogie Wizzard; Chris Brown; Nasri; Nick Turpin; Jay Riehl

Justin Bieber chronology
Never Say Never: The Remixes (2011)	Under the Mistletoe (2011)	Believe (2012)

Singles from Under the Mistletoe
- 1. "Mistletoe" Released: October 17, 2011; 2. "All I Want for Christmas Is You (SuperFestive!)" Released: December 9, 2011

Under the Mistletoe is the first Christmas album and second studio album by the Canadian singer Justin Bieber, released on November 1, 2011, by RBMG/Island Def Jam Music Group. The album features fifteen tracks, including seven original songs co-written by Bieber, along with cover versions of Christmas carols and standards. Fellow artists Usher, Boyz II Men, Mariah Carey, Busta Rhymes, and the Band Perry all make guest appearances on the album.

The album debuted at number one on the US Billboard 200 chart and the Billboard Top Holiday Albums chart, selling 210,000 copies in its first week, becoming the first Christmas album by a male artist to debut at number one. This was Bieber's third number-one album on the Billboard 200, following Never Say Never: The Remixes earlier in the year. With this album he became the first artist to earn three number one albums on the chart before his 18th birthday. The album is currently certified double platinum by the Recording Industry Association of America (RIAA), for sales of over two million units.

== Background ==
On August 25, 2011, Bieber announced that he would be releasing his first Christmas album and second studio album later in 2011. Manager Scooter Braun and vocal producer Kuk Harrell confirmed a week later that Bieber had collaborated with Sean Kingston and Taylor Swift, and worked with producers The Messengers. Later that month, it was announced that Boyz II Men, Usher, and The Band Perry were also collaborating with Bieber on the album. On September 30, 2011, Bieber released the official album cover and album name on Facebook. On October 4, 2011, Mariah Carey revealed that she and Bieber recorded her song "All I Want for Christmas Is You" as a duet for the new album. Bieber's version of the song "Santa Claus Is Coming To Town" from the motion picture Arthur Christmas, samples "I Want You Back" and "ABC" by the Jackson 5.

== Singles ==
The album's first single "Mistletoe", was written and produced with The Messengers, and it was released on October 17, 2011. The album's second single, "All I Want for Christmas Is You (SuperFestive!)", was released as a radio airplay only single in Italy on December 9, 2011.

== Critical reception ==
Professional ratings
Aggregate scores
Source	Rating
Metacritic	54/100
Review scores
Source	Rating
AllMusic	3/5 stars
Entertainment Weekly	C+
The Guardian	2/5 stars

Under the Mistletoe was met with generally mixed reviews. At Metacritic, the album received an average score of 54, based on four critical reviews. AllMusic also assessed the critical consensus giving the album three stars.

Andy Kellman of AllMusic credited Bieber "for the effort he put in" and for not "sleepwalking" through the Christmas album like "most artists," although he did feel that Bieber "definitely sounds more enthused by the original songs" while calling Bieber's "Drummer Boy" goofy but complimenting his version of "Santa Claus Is Coming To Town." Writing for Entertainment Weekly, Adam Markovitz also felt that the original songs were much better than the covers, calling them "sleigh-ride-smooth R&B jangles" while writing that "the classics bring no cheer." Jason Scott of The Seattle Post-Intelligencer gave the album a positive review, writing that Bieber "proves he is a mainstay in the industry by crafting a highly energetic and expressive album that is filled to the brim with eggnog flavored treats, ranging from straight up pop and R&B to country" and named it "a wonderful performance."

Caroline Sullivan of The Guardian opined that "the guests are the album's saving grace" and felt that "they generally outclass his by quite a stretch," although she did feel that "holds his own" against Mariah Carey. Jon Caramanica of The New York Times wrote that Bieber "[hadn't] ever sounded this good" but also felt that he was at times overshadowed on the guest appearances.

== Commercial performance ==
Under the Mistletoe debuted at number one on the US Billboard 200 chart, selling 210,000 copies in its first week. This became Bieber's third US number one debut and his fifth US top ten album. It also became the first Christmas album by a male artist to debut at number one and the first solo artist to have three number one albums before his 18th birthday. In its second week, the album dropped to number six on the chart, selling an additional 97,000 copies, which was a 54% decrease. In its third week, the album climbed to number five on the chart, selling 84,000 more copies. In its fourth week, the album dropped to number six on the chart, selling 142,000 copies, which was a 69% increase. By the end of 2011, the album totaled 1,245,000 copies in US sales, according to Nielsen SoundScan, and was the eleventh best-selling album of the year. As of December 2015, the album had sold 1,510,000 copies. On June 24, 2020, the album was certified double platinum by the Recording Industry Association of America (RIAA) for combined sales and album-equivalent units of over two million units in the United States.

The album also debuted at number one in Canada, and within the top 10 in Ireland, Italy, Spain, Denmark, Australia, Norway, Sweden, New Zealand, and the Netherlands.

== Track listing ==
Under the Mistletoe track listing
No.	Title	Writer(s)	Producer(s)	Length
1.	"Only Thing I Ever Get for Christmas"	Christopher Stewart; Aaron Pearce; Tim Miner; Justin Bieber	Stewart; Pearce	3:12
2.	"Mistletoe"	Nasri Atweh; Adam Messinger; Bieber	The Messengers	3:02
3.	"The Christmas Song (Chestnuts Roasting on an Open Fire)" (featuring Usher)	Mel Tormé; Robert Wells	Kuk Harrell; Sean K	3:35
4.	"Santa Claus Is Coming to Town"	John Frederick Coots; Haven Gillespie; Berry Gordy; Freddie Perren; Deke Richards; Alphonzo Mizell	Stewart; Pearce	3:36
5.	"Fa La La" (featuring Boyz II Men)	Adonis Shropshire; Bieber; Bernard Harvey	Harvey; Josh Cross	3:05
6.	"All I Want for Christmas Is You (SuperFestive!)" (duet with Mariah Carey)	Mariah Carey; Walter Afanasieff	Carey; James "Big Jim" Wright; Randy Jackson; Harrell	4:00
7.	"Drummer Boy" (featuring Busta Rhymes)	Katherine Davis; Henry Onorati; Harry Simeone; with additional raps written by Justin Bieber and Busta Rhymes	Harrell; Sean K; Bieber*	3:45
8.	"Christmas Eve"	Chris Brown; Bieber; Antwan Thompson; Jerrol "Boogie" Wizzard; Kevin McCall	Thompson; Boogie Wizzard; Brown*	3:43
9.	"All I Want Is You"	Bieber; Brandon Hamilton	Bieber	3:36
10.	"Home This Christmas" (featuring The Band Perry)	Atweh; Nick Turpin; George Nozuka; Melanie Fontana; Bieber	Nasri; Turpin	3:24
11.	"Silent Night"	Joseph Mohr; Hans Xaver Gruber [sic]	Harrell	2:49
Total length:				37:51

Deluxe edition bonus tracks
No.	Title	Writer(s)	Producer(s)	Length
12.	"Christmas Love"	Atweh; Messinger; Bieber	The Messengers	3:26
13.	"Fa La La" (acapella version; featuring Boyz II Men)	Shropshire; Bieber; Harvey	Harvey; Cross	2:55
14.	"Pray"	Atweh; Messinger; Omar Martinez; Bieber	The Messengers	3:32
15.	"Someday at Christmas"	Ronald Miller; Bryan Wells	Jay Riehl	2:53
Total length:				50:38

Japanese deluxe edition bonus track
No.	Title	Writer(s)	Producer(s)	Length
16.	"All I Want Is You" (acoustic version)	Bieber; Brandon Hamilton	Bieber	3:38
Total length:				3:38

Deluxe edition DVD
No.	Title	Length
16.	"In the Studio Making the Album"
17.	"Making of the "Mistletoe" Video"
18.	"Pray" (music video)

Note: (*) denotes a co-producer

== Personnel ==
Credits are adapted from liner notes

- Justin Bieber – vocals (3, 9, 11, lead on 1–2, 4–6, 8, 10, singing on 7), rap vocals (7), live drums (7), music producer (7, 9)
- Nasri Atweh – music producer (10), musical arrangements (10), additional background vocals (2)
- The Band Perry – vocals (10)
- Brandon Bee – drums (10), bass played by (10)
- Jonathan Berry – guitar (10)
- Durell Bottoms – assistant recording engineer (5)
- Boyz II Men – vocals (5)
- Chris Brown – background vocals (8), music producer (8)
- Busta Rhymes – rap vocals (7)
- Mariah Carey – lead vocals (6), music producer (6)
- Tim Carmon – piano (3), keyboards (11)
- Martin Cooke – assistant recording engineer (6)
- Josh Cross – music producer (5)
- Melonie Daniels – background vocals (6)
- Brad Dechter – musical arrangement (6), orchestral arrangement (6)
- Greg DePante – assistant recording engineer (6)
- Nicolas Essig – assistant recording engineer (5)
- Iain Findlay – assistant recording engineer (8)
- Angie Fisher – background vocals (6)
- Jesus Garnica – assistant audio mixing (1, 4–5, 7–8)
- Jerohn Garrett – drums (6)
- Brian Garten – recording engineer (6)
- Sharlotte Gibson – background vocals (6)
- Josh Gudwin – recording engineer
- Kuk Harrell – vocal producer, music producer (11), background vocals (1, 4)
- Bernard Harvey – music producer (5)
- Bryan Jackson – background vocals (4)
- Randy Jackson – music producer (6)
- Jaycen Joshua – audio mixing (1, 4–5, 7–8)
- Sean K. – music producer (3, 7), music programming (3)
- Thomas Kanarek – assistant recording engineer (6)
- Mitch Kinney – assistant recording engineer (2, 5, 8)
- Miguel Lara – assistant recording engineer (1–5, 7–11)
- Damien Lewis – assistant audio mixing (2–3, 6), additional recording engineer (9–11)
- Peter Mack – assistant recording engineer (6)
- Sherry McGhee – background vocals (6)
- The Messengers – music producers (2), instrumental arrangement (2), vocal arrangement (2)
- Adam Messinger – all instruments (2)
- Luis Navarro – assistant recording engineer (1, 4)
- George Nozuka – additional background vocals (10)
- Chris "Tek" O'Ryan – recording engineer
- Charlie Paakkari – assistant recording engineer (6)
- Aaron Pearce – music producer (1, 4), music programming (1, 4)
- Doc Powell – guitar (6)
- Daniela Rivera – assistant audio mixing (2–3), additional recording engineer (9–11)
- Marc Shaiman – musical arrangement (6), orchestral arrangement (6)
- Jason Sherwood – assistant recording engineer (3)
- Adonis Shropshire – additional background vocals (5)
- Brian Springer – recording engineer (8)
- C. "Tricky" Stewart – music producer (1, 4), music programming (1, 4)
- Tom Strahle – guitar (9)
- S'Von – piano (10)
- Phil Tan – audio mixing (2–3, 6, 9–11)
- Antwan Thompson – music producer (8)
- Lloyd "Sonny" Thompson – bass played by (6)
- Michael Thompson – guitar (1, 3–4)
- Micah Tolentino – background vocals (6)
- Nick Turpin – music producer (10), musical arrangement (10), additional background vocals (10)
- Usher – vocals (3)
- Stephen Villa – assistant recording engineer (1, 4)
- Jerrol "Boogie" Wizzard – music producer (8)
- James "Big Jim" Wright – music producer (6), keyboards (6)

== Charts ==
=== Weekly charts ===
Weekly chart performance for Under the Mistletoe
Chart (2011–2025)	Peak position
Australian Albums (ARIA)	6
Austrian Albums (Ö3 Austria)	22
Belgian Albums (Ultratop Flanders)	11
Belgian Albums (Ultratop Wallonia)	17
Canadian Albums (Billboard)	1
Czech Albums (ČNS IFPI)	41
Danish Albums (Hitlisten)	2
Dutch Albums (Album Top 100)	6
Finnish Albums (Suomen virallinen lista)	12
French Albums (SNEP)	14
German Albums (Offizielle Top 100)	18
Hungarian Albums (MAHASZ)	16
Irish Albums (IRMA)	5
Italian Albums (FIMI)	6
Japanese Hot Albums (Billboard Japan)	38
Latvian Albums (LAIPA)	11
Lithuanian Albums (AGATA)	16
New Zealand Albums (RMNZ)	7
Norwegian Albums (VG-lista)	3
Polish Albums (ZPAV)	33
Portuguese Albums (AFP)	10
Scottish Albums (Official Charts)	18
Spanish Albums (Promusicae)	4
Swedish Albums (Sverigetopplistan)	5
Swiss Albums (Schweizer Hitparade)	25
UK Albums (Official Charts)	13
US Billboard 200	1
US Top Holiday Albums (Billboard)	1

=== Year-end charts ===
Year-end chart performance for Under the Mistletoe
Chart (2011)	Position
Australian Albums (ARIA)	31
Canadian Albums (Billboard)	36
French Albums (SNEP)	139
Mexican Albums (Top 100 Albums)	20
New Zealand Albums (RMNZ)	45
Swedish Albums (Sverigetopplistan)	36
UK Albums (OCC)	85
US Billboard 200	94
Chart (2012)	Position
Canadian Albums (Billboard)	5
US Billboard 200	13
Chart (2013)	Position
US Billboard 200	172
Chart (2017)	Position
Danish Albums (Hitlisten)	90

== Certifications and sales ==
Certifications and sales for Under the Mistletoe
Region	Certification	Certified units/sales
Australia (ARIA)	Platinum	70,000^{^}
Brazil (Pro-Música Brasil)	Platinum	40,000^{*}
Canada (Music Canada)	5× Platinum	400,000^{‡}
Denmark (IFPI Danmark)	3× Platinum	60,000^{‡}
Ireland (IRMA)	Platinum	15,000^{^}
Italy (FIMI)	Gold	30,000^{*}
Mexico (AMPROFON)	Platinum	60,000^{^}
New Zealand (RMNZ)	Platinum	15,000^{‡}
Norway (IFPI Norway)	Platinum	20,000^{‡}
Poland (ZPAV)	Gold	10,000^{‡}
Spain (Promusicae)	Gold	20,000^{^}
Sweden (GLF)	Gold	20,000^{‡}
Taiwan	—	15,000
United Kingdom (BPI)	Gold	100,000^{*}
United States (RIAA)	2× Platinum	2,000,000^{‡}
Venezuela	Gold	
^{*} Sales figures based on certification alone.^{^} Shipments figures based on certification alone.^{‡} Sales+streaming figures based on certification alone.

== See also ==
- Justin Bieber discography
- List of Billboard number-one holiday albums of the 2010s
