= Starley =

Starley may refer to:

- Starley (singer) (born 1987), Australian singer
- James Starley (1830–1881), English inventor and father of the bicycle industry
- John Kemp Starley (1855–1901), English inventor and industrialist who is widely considered the inventor of the modern bicycle
