= My Worlds Acoustic =

Remix album by Justin Bieber
- Released: November 26, 2010
- Genre: Acoustic
- Length: 37:47
- Labels: Island; Teen Island; RBMG; Schoolboy
- Producers: Chris Hicks; Dan Kanter; Rob Wells; Kuk Harrell; The Messengers

Justin Bieber chronology
My Worlds: The Collection (2010)	My Worlds Acoustic (2010)	Never Say Never: The Remixes (2011)

Singles from My Worlds Acoustic
- 1. "Pray" Released: December 9, 2010

My Worlds Acoustic is the debut remix album by the Canadian singer Justin Bieber. It was released on November 26, 2010, and was initially sold exclusively at Walmart retail stores and Sam's Club. The album features nine acoustic versions of songs from his debut extended play, My World (2009), and first album My World 2.0 (2010), as well as a new song "Pray". The new versions of the songs were produced by Bieber's music director, Dan Kanter, his vocal producer Kuk Harrell, and also producer Rob Wells. Internationally, the set is included as a part of the compilation album, My Worlds: The Collection (2010), which included songs from the previous two releases. My Worlds Acoustic was released to iTunes, on February 8, 2011.

According to Bieber, he wanted to release the album for the naysayers who critiqued his actual singing ability. The singer said that he wanted to have an acoustic album, to reflect the effect of production on his vocals. Although labeled as an acoustic album, the songs still include subtle usages of electronic sounds such as synthesizers. The album received generally favorable reviews from critics, however most critics were not satisfied that the album was not genuinely acoustic. In Canada, the song debuted at number five, and later peaked at number four on the Canadian Albums Chart and certified Platinum by the Canadian Recording Industry Association. My Worlds Acoustic debuted at number seven on the US Billboard 200, selling 115,000 copies in its first week, becoming Bieber's third consecutive top ten album.

== Background and marketing ==
On October 18, 2010, Bieber announced on his Twitter plans for an acoustic album in time for the holiday season, and that it would feature unplugged versions of his songs, as well as a new song. Days later, on October 24, 2010, he revealed that the album was set for release on November 26, 2010. In an interview with MTV News, Bieber said that the album was for the "haters" who say he cannot sing and saying his voice was auto-tuned, and that "stripping it down and having it kind of really mellow and being able to hear my voice" was his intention. The singer said he wanted to do the acoustic set because the Electronic Music production sometimes "drowns out your voice" and "takes away from the singer, over the synths and everything." According to Kyle Anderson of MTV News the album might not have been "just another project", but rather the purpose could be "to prove that he has the skills to sustain a long and fulfilling career." In the same interview he confirmed that "Baby" and other My World 2.0 songs were re-recorded, as well as a new song.

It was later confirmed that the song was an inspirational song entitled "Pray." According to Bieber, the song is a gift to his fans. The song's arrangement is set to reflect Bieber's music before he was discovered, but also includes instrumentation from a string quartet, congas, and a cajón drum, the latter to represent Bieber's worldly travels, specifically to Africa. While Bieber was being interviewed by Ryan Seacrest on his radio show, Bieber talked about the song's initial writing stating that it was influenced by Michael Jackson, and he thought of Jackson's "Man in the Mirror" when writing the song. Vocally, Bieber's vocals are sung in a lower key compared to previous singles. Bieber plays guitar on the album, along with his guitarist and musical director Dan Kanter. The new versions of the other songs on the album were produced by Kanter, Bieber's vocal producer Kuk Harrell, and also producer Rob Wells.

To promote the album as well as draw interest for Bieber's then-upcoming 3D film, Justin Bieber: Never Say Never, Bieber shot an alternate music video for the acoustic version of the song, "Never Say Never." The video premiered during Game 3 of the 2010 World Series, and in the clip, the singer dons apparel from both teams. Bieber performed "Pray" for the first time at the 2010 American Music Awards. The performance opened with Bieber sitting playing the piano while singing. Midway through the performance Bieber arose from the piano and took center stage; he was accompanied by a choir singing background vocals. The performance was ended with Bieber kneeling singing the song's title, the performance was greeted by standing ovation from the audience. After originally being sold only at Walmart and Sam's Club first, the album was released on iTunes on February 11, 2011, accompanying the release of Justin Bieber: Never Say Never, and preceding the release of Never Say Never – The Remixes.

== Critical reception ==
Professional ratings
Review scores
Source	Rating
AllMusic	2.5/5 stars
Billboard	(positive)
Chicago Sun-Times	2/4 stars
Entertainment Weekly	(B−)
Rockstar Weekly	4/5 stars
The Daily Telegraph	(positive)
The Washington Post	(favorable)

Lucy Jones of The Daily Telegraph said that "with catchy choruses, soulful key changes and cute hooks laid bare, these are undeniably brilliant pop songs." Jones further commented that "finger clicks, bongos and mellow guitars are a welcome change from the squealing synths and pounding beats favoured by Bieber and his peers," and that the album had the ability to connect with audiences beyond his demographic. Mikael Wood of Entertainment Weekly gave the album a "B−" rating, stating that the album doesn't change Bieber's beloved "kiddie-soul vocals" calling it "perfunctory", but said that acoustic renditions such as "Baby", "One Time" and new song "Pray" deliver their "saccharine payload." Thomas Conneron of Chicago Sun-Times said that "calming down several of the pop tunes with slower tempos and patient singing" was not bad and that slowing everything down made listeners hear how the singer's voice had matured.

Calling it "the sugariest acoustic album in history," Allison Stewart of The Washington Post said "its arrangements and melodies – the best parts of any Bieber record - are stripped down but otherwise little changed, demonstrating just how great most of these songs were to begin with." Stewart also said that urban numbers such as "Baby," "survive their makeovers without a hitch." Andy Kellman of Allmusic gave the album 2 and a half out of 5 stars saying that the album was "an enticement." Dan Savoie of Rockstar Weekly gave the album 4 out of 5 stars, saying that it is "the perfect showcase for a talented young artist who's on his way to the Grammy Awards this year." Although she commented that the "acoustic" labeling was a bit misleading, Monica Hererra of Billboard said that the album "succeeds", calling songs like the live version of "Favorite Girl" the album's saving grace and "truly acoustic." On the former, Herrera said, "It's the one moment where you can hear all of the young artist's strengths falling in line-raw talent, maturing vocals and, of course, an all-too-valuable connection with his fans."

== Commercial performance ==
In Canada, My Worlds Acoustic it debuted at number five on the Canadian Albums Chart, then rose to number four the following week. The album was subsequently certified Platinum by the Canadian Recording Industry Association the same month it was released, shifting over 80,000 units. The album debuted at number seven on the Billboard 200 with 115,000 copies sold in the first week released. My Worlds Acoustic became Bieber's second top ten album in a little over a year, following the extended play My World and debut studio album, My World 2.0. After fluctuating on the chart for weeks, due to the album being available for digital download on iTunes, the album returned to the top ten of the Billboard on the week of February 26, 2011.

== Track listing ==
Standard edition
No.	Title	Writer(s)	Length
1.	"One Time"	Terius Nash; Christopher Stewart; James Bunton; Corron Cole; Thabiso Nkhereanye	3:06
2.	"Baby"	Justin Bieber; Nash; Stewart; Christopher Bridges; Christina Milian	3:35
3.	"One Less Lonely Girl"	Sean Hamilton; Ezekiel Lewis; Balewa Muhammad; Hyuk Shin; Usher Raymond IV^{[a]}	3:57
4.	"Down to Earth"	Bieber; Carlos Battey; Steven Battey; Mason Levy; Waynne Nugent; Kevin Risto	4:03
5.	"U Smile"	Bieber; Arden Altino; Jerry Duplessis; Dan Rigo	3:16
6.	"Stuck in the Moment"	Bieber; Rigo; Jeremy Reeves; Ray Romulus; Jonathan Yip	3:18
7.	"Favorite Girl" (live)	Antea Birchett; Anesha Birchett; Dernst Emile II; Delisha Thomas	5:09
8.	"That Should Be Me"	Bieber; Nasri Atweh; Adam Messinger; Luke Boyd	4:09
9.	"Never Say Never" (featuring Jaden Smith)	Bieber; Jaden Smith; Atweh; Messinger; Thaddis Harrell; Omarr Rambert	3:42
10.	"Pray"	Bieber; Atweh; Messinger; Omar Martinez	3:32
Total length:			37:47

iTunes bonus video
No.	Title	Director(s)	Length
11.	"Pray"	Scott Braun; Alfredo Flores	3:33
Total length:			41:20

Notes

- All tracks are noted as "acoustic version".
- ^{^[a]} signifies a songwriter that is only listed on physical editions of the album.

== Personnel ==
Adapted from My Worlds Acoustic liner notes.

- Scooter Braun – executive producer
- Usher Raymond IV – executive producer
- L.A. Reid – executive producer
- Christopher Hicks – producer (all tracks)
- Kuk Harrell – vocal producer (all tracks); producer (tracks 1–9)
- Dan Kanter – producer (tracks 1–9)
- Rob Wells – producer (tracks 1–9)
- The Messengers – producer (track 10)
- Glenn Schick – mastering

== Charts ==
=== Weekly charts ===
Chart (2010)	Peak position
Canadian Albums (Billboard)	4
US Billboard 200	7

=== Year-end charts ===
Chart (2011)	Position
Canadian Albums (Billboard)	14
US Billboard 200	29

== Certifications ==
Region	Certification	Certified units/sales
Canada (Music Canada)	Platinum	80,000^{^}
United States (RIAA)	Gold	841,000
^{^} Shipments figures based on certification alone.
