= My Worlds: The Collection =

Compilation album by Justin Bieber
- Released: November 19, 2010
- Label: Island; Teen Island; RBMG; Schoolboy
- Producer: Dan Kanter; Rob Wells; Kuk Harrell; Stereotypes; The Messengers; J-Stax

Justin Bieber chronology
| My World 2.0 (2010) | My Worlds: The Collection (2010) | My Worlds Acoustic (2010) |

Singles from My Worlds: The Collection
- 1. "Pray" Released: December 9, 2010

My Worlds: The Collection is the first compilation album released by the Canadian singer Justin Bieber. As the international alternative to the Walmart and Sam's Club exclusive My Worlds Acoustic (2010), My Worlds: The Collection was released in numerous European countries on November 19, 2010. It is a double album consisting of two discs; the first is a slightly altered version of My Worlds Acoustic, and the second is My Worlds, a compilation itself made up of Bieber's first EP My World (2009) and his first studio album, My World 2.0 (2010). In addition, the compilation also features a new song, an inspirational ballad entitled "Pray" (which served as the project's only single), an acoustic version of Bieber's collaboration with Jaden Smith, "Never Say Never", and remixes of his single "Somebody to Love". The new versions of the songs were produced by Bieber's music director, Dan Kanter, his vocal producer Kuk Harrell, and also record producer Rob Wells. While most professional reviewers complimented the set, several thought that its release was unneeded. The album charted moderately in Europe, reaching the top half of several countries' album charts.

== Background ==
The first disc includes songs from My Worlds Acoustic, which features acoustic version of songs from Bieber's debut extended play, My World, and his first studio album, My World 2.0. Bieber spoke with MTV News and he wanted to record the acoustic songs for the "haters" who say he cannot sing and saying his voice was auto-tuned, and that "stripping it down and having it kind of really mellow and being able to hear my voice" was his purpose. The singer said he wanted to do the acoustic set because the production sometimes "drowns out your voice" and "takes away from the singer, over the synths and everything." In addition to the acoustic tracks, the first disc also contains the Usher-featuring and J-Stax remixes to "Somebody to Love", the single version of "Never Say Never", featuring Jaden Smith, as well as a new song, an inspirational ballad entitled, "Pray". The second disc features songs that were present on My Worlds, a package of My World and My World 2.0, which was released instead of or in conjunction with My World 2.0 in select countries.

According to Bieber, "Pray" is a gift to his fans. The song's arrangement is set to reflect Bieber's music before he was discovered, but also includes instrumentation from a string quartet, congas, and a cajon drum, the latter to represent Bieber's worldly travels, specifically to Africa. While Bieber was being interviewed by Ryan Seacrest on his radio show, Bieber talked about the song's initial writing stating the song was influenced by Michael Jackson, and he thought of Jackson's "Man in the Mirror" when writing the song. Vocally, Bieber's vocals are sung in a lower key compared to previous singles. Bieber plays guitar on the acoustic versions, along with his guitarist and musical director Dan Kanter. The acoustic versions of the songs were produced by Kanter, Bieber's vocal producer Kuk Harrell, and also producer Rob Wells.

The album was released on November 19, 2010. "Pray" was released as the album's first and only single on in select countries on December 3, 2010. It charted moderately, reaching number sixty-three in Austria, fifty-one in Germany, and appeared on the Tip charts in Belgium.

== Critical reception ==
The compilation received mixed reviews from critics. Andy Kellman of Allmusic gave the album four out of five stars. Although Lucy Jones of The Daily Telegraph said the album seemed as something else to be "cashed in on", she called the collaborations "perfectly polished", and gave the album four out of five stars. Hermonie Hoby of The Guardian said that "regifting" following his past two releases seemed unnecessary, but noted that "the billion or so Beliebers" wouldn't feel "churlish."

== Commercial performance ==
Due to its limited release in European countries, the album was only eligible to chart in those territories. In Denmark, on the Danish Albums Chart, My Worlds: The Collection debuted at number twenty-six. Six weeks later, on the week labeled January 4, 2011, the album peaked at number thirteen on the chart, and it spent a total of fifteen weeks on chart. My Worlds: The Collection debuted at number forty-five on the Swedish Albums Chart, and six weeks later peaked at number thirty. On the Dutch Albums Chart, the album debuted at number forty-one, and peaked at number twenty-six the next week. It spent a total of sixteen weeks on the chart.

On the Finnish Albums Chart the album debuted at number forty-nine, and fell off the chart the next week. However, the week of January 1, 2011, the album re-entered the chart at number forty-seven, and peaked at number thirty-six the next week. The album debuted and peaked at forty-three on the Greek Albums Chart, spending a week on the chart.

== Track listing ==
Disc 1
| No. | Title | Writer(s) | Producer(s) | Length |
|---|---|---|---|---|
| 1. | "One Time" (acoustic version) | Christopher Stewart, Terius Nash, James Bunton, Corron Cole, Thabiso Nkhereanye | Dan Kanter, Rob Wells, Kuk Harrell | 3:06 |
| 2. | "Baby" (acoustic version) | Justin Bieber, Stewart, Nash, Christina Milian, Christopher Bridges | Kanter, Wells, Harrell | 3:35 |
| 3. | "One Less Lonely Girl" (acoustic version) | Ezekiel Lewis, Balewa Muhammad, Sean P. Hamilton, Hyuk Shin, Usher Raymond IV | Kanter, Wells, Harrell | 3:57 |
| 4. | "Down to Earth" (acoustic version) | Bieber, Kevin Risto, Waynne Nugent, Mason Levy, Carlos Battey, Steven Battey | Kanter, Wells, Harrell | 4:03 |
| 5. | "U Smile" (acoustic version) | Bieber, Jerry Duplessis, Arden Altino, Dan August Rigo | Kanter, Wells, Harrell | 3:16 |
| 6. | "Stuck in the Moment" (acoustic version) | Bieber, Rigo, Jonathan Yip, Ray Romulus, Jeremy Reeves | Kanter, Wells, Harrell | 3:18 |
| 7. | "Favorite Girl" (live acoustic version) | Antea Birchett, Anesha Birchet, Dernst Emile II, Delisha Thomas | Kanter, Wells, Harrell | 5:09 |
| 8. | "That Should Be Me" (acoustic version) | Bieber, Adam Messinger, Nasri Atweh, Luke Boyd | Kanter, Wells, Harrell | 4:09 |
| 9. | "Never Say Never" (acoustic version) (featuring Jaden Smith) | Bieber, Jaden Smith, Messinger, Atweh, Harrell, Omarr Rambert | Kanter, Wells, Harrell | 3:43 |
| 10. | "Pray" | Bieber, Atweh, Messinger, Omar Martinez | Kanter, Wells, Harrell | 3:34 |
| 11. | "Somebody to Love" (Remix featuring Usher) | Bieber, Reeves, Romulus, Yip, Bright | Stereotypes | 3:41 |
| 12. | "Never Say Never" (featuring Jaden Smith) | Bieber, Smith, Messinger, Atweh, Harrell, Rambert | The Messengers, Harrell, Rambert (voc.) | 3:47 |
| 13. | "Somebody to Love" (J-Stax Remix) | Bieber, Reeves, Romulus, Yip, Bright | Stereotypes, J-Stax | 3:32 |

Disc 2 – My Worlds
| No. | Title | Writer(s) | Producer(s) | Length |
|---|---|---|---|---|
| 1. | "One Time" | Stewart, Nash, Bunton, Cole, Nkhereanye | JB & Corron, Stewart, Harrell (voc.) | 3:35 |
| 2. | "Favorite Girl" | Birchett, Birchett, Emile II, Thomas | D'Mile, Harrell (voc.) | 4:16 |
| 3. | "Down to Earth" | Bieber, Risto, Nugent, Levy, C. Battey, S. Battey | Dirty Swift, Bruce Waynne, Harrell (voc.) | 4:05 |
| 4. | "Bigger" | Bieber, Risto, Nugent, Dapo Torimiro, Lonny Breaux | Swift, Waynne, Torimiro, Harrell (voc.) | 3:17 |
| 5. | "One Less Lonely Girl" | Lewis, Muhammad, Hamilton, Shin, Raymond IV | Lewis, Muhammad, Hamilton, Shin, Harrell (voc.) | 3:49 |
| 6. | "First Dance" (featuring Usher) | Bieber, Raymond IV, Jesse "Corparal" Wilson, Ryan Lovette, Dwight Reynolds, Alexander "Prettyboifresh" Parhm Jr. | Prettyboifresh, Harrell (voc.) | 3:42 |
| 7. | "Love Me" | Peter Svensson, Nina Persson | DJ Frank E, Bill Malina (voc.) | 3:13 |
| 8. | "Common Denominator" | Bieber, Lashaunda "Babygirl" Carr | Carr, Harrell (voc.) | 4:10 |
| 9. | "Baby" (featuring Ludacris) | Bieber, Nash, Stewart, Milian, Bridges | The-Dream, Stewart, Harrell (voc.) | 3:33 |
| 10. | "Somebody to Love" | Bieber, Reeves, Romulus, Yip, Bright | Stereotypes, Harrell (voc.) | 3:40 |
| 11. | "Stuck in the Moment" | Bieber, Reeves, Romulus, Yip, Rigo | Stereotypes, Harrell (voc.) | 3:42 |
| 12. | "U Smile" | Bieber, Duplessis, Altino, Rigo | Duplessis, Altino, Harrell (voc.) | 3:16 |
| 13. | "Runaway Love" | Bieber, Melvin Hough II, Rivelino Wouter, Timothy Thomas, Theron Thomas | Mel & Mus, Harrell (voc.) | 3:32 |
| 14. | "Never Let You Go" | Bieber, Johnta Austin, Bryan-Michael Cox | Cox | 4:24 |
| 15. | "Overboard" (featuring Jessica Jarrell) | Bieber, Risto, Nugent, Torimiro, Adonis Shropshire | Swift, Waynne, Torimiro, Harrell (voc.) | 4:11 |
| 16. | "Eenie Meenie" (with Sean Kingston) | Bieber, C.Battey, S. Battey, Kisean Anderson | Benny Blanco, Harrell (voc.), Steve "Ill Rock" Siravo (voc.) | 3:22 |
| 17. | "Up" | Bieber, Messinger, Atweh | The Messengers, Harrell (voc.) | 3:54 |
| 18. | "That Should Be Me" | Bieber, Messinger, Atweh, Luke Boyd | The Messengers, Harrell (voc.) | 3:54 |

Japanese bonus tracks
| No. | Title | Writer(s) | Producer(s) | Length |
|---|---|---|---|---|
| 19. | "Kiss and Tell" | Andrew Harr, Jermaine Jackson, Rigo, Andre Davidson, Sean Davidson, Karlyn Ramsey, Bieber | The Runners, The Monarch (co.) | 3:47 |
| 20. | "Where Are You Now?" | Bieber | Cox, Bieber, "Mama Jan" Smith; original production by "Mama Jan" Smith, Demond Mickens, Bieber | 4:27 |

Sample credits

- "Love Me" contains an interpolation of "Lovefool" (1996), performed by Swedish band The Cardigans.

== Personnel ==
Adapted from My Worlds: The Collection liner notes.

Personnel

- Justin Bieber – vocals
- The Jackie Boyz – background vocals
- Taylor Graves – background vocals
- Bonnie McKee – background vocals
- Dwight Reynolds – keyboards
- Frédéric Yonnet – harmonica

Production

- Antonio "L.A." Reid – executive producer
- Arden Altino – producer
- Nasri Atweh – producer
- Warren Babson – engineer
- Matt Beckley – editing
- Benny Blanco – producer
- Scooter Braun – executive producer
- James Bunton – producer
- Lashaunda "Babygirl" Carr – producer
- Corron Cole – producer
- Bryan Michael Cox – producer
- Tom Coyne – mastering
- Glenn Schick – mastering
- Jerry Duplessis – producer
- Dernst Emile II – producer
- Blake Eiseman – recording
- Jaycen Joshua-Fowler mixing
- Justin Franks – producer
- Serban Ghenea – mixing
- Christy Hall – production assistant
- Sean Hamilton – producer
- Kuk Harrell – vocal producer, producer
- Christopher Hicks – producer
- Melvin Hough – producer
- Dan Kanter – producer
- Phillip Lynah Jr. – engineer
- Erik Madrid – mixing Assistant
- Glen Marchese – mixing
- Manny Marroquin – mixing
- Ezekiel Lewis – producer
- Giancarlo Lino – mixing assistant
- Adam Messinger – producer
- Balewa Muhammad – producer
- Terius Nash – producer
- Luis Navarro – assistant engineer
- Waynne Nugent – producer
- Dave Pensado – mixing
- Jeremy Reeves – producer
- Kevin Risto – producer
- Ray Romulus – producer
- Chris "Tek" O'Ryan – production engineer
- Greg Ogan – engineer
- Christian Plata – mixing assistant
- Kevin Porter – recording assistant
- Kelly Sheehan – Engineer
- Hyuk Shin – producer
- Tricky Stewart – producer
- Brian "B-Luv" Thomas – engineer
- Sam Thomas – engineer
- Pat Thrall – engineer
- Dapo Torimiro – producer
- Sergio "Sergical" Tsai – engineer
- Rob Wells – producer
- Andrew Wuepper – engineer
- Jonathan Yip – producer

== Charts ==
=== Weekly charts ===
| Chart (2010–2011) | Peak position |
|---|---|
| Danish Albums (Hitlisten) | 12 |
| Dutch Albums (Album Top 100) | 17 |
| Finnish Albums (Suomen virallinen lista) | 36 |
| Greek Albums (IFPI) | 43 |
| Italian Albums (FIMI) | 27 |
| Swedish Albums (Sverigetopplistan) | 27 |

| Chart (2026) | Peak position |
|---|---|
| Swedish Albums (Sverigetopplistan) | 11 |

=== Year-end charts ===
| Chart (2010) | Position |
|---|---|
| Brazil Albums (Pro-Música Brasil) | 2 |

| Chart (2011) | Position |
|---|---|
| Danish Albums (Hitlisten) | 36 |
| Dutch Albums (Album Top 100) | 81 |
| Swedish Albums (Sverigetopplistan) | 49 |

== Certifications ==
| Region | Certification | Certified units/sales |
|---|---|---|
| Denmark (IFPI Danmark) | 3× Platinum | 60,000^{‡} |
| Mexico (AMPROFON) | Gold | 30,000^{^} |
| New Zealand (RMNZ) | 5× Platinum | 75,000^{‡} |
| Sweden (GLF) | Gold | 20,000^{‡} |
^{^} Shipments figures based on certification alone.^{‡} Sales+streaming figures based on certification alone.
