= Chris Hicks =

Chris or Christopher Hicks may refer to:

- Chris Hicks (rugby league) (born 1977), Australian professional rugby league footballer
- Chris Hicks (record executive) (born 1970), American record industry executive
- Christopher Hicks, a.k.a. Oly Hicks (born 1968), Canadian-Italian ice hockey coach
- Chris Hicks (lawyer), district attorney in Washoe County, Nevada, son of US district judge Larry R. Hicks
