= The Karate Kid (soundtrack) =

The Karate Kid (Music from the Motion Picture)

Soundtrack album by James Horner
- Released: June 15, 2010
- Genre: Film score
- Length: 64:14
- Label: Madison Gate
- Producers: James Horner; Simon Rhodes

James Horner chronology
Avatar (2009)	The Karate Kid (2010)	Black Gold (2011)

The Karate Kid (Music from the Motion Picture) is the soundtrack to the 2010 film The Karate Kid, directed by Harald Zwart and starred Jaden Smith and Jackie Chan, which is a remake of the 1984 film of the same name and the fifth film in The Karate Kid franchise. The album featured 18 tracks composed by James Horner and released through Madison Gate Records on June 15, 2010.

== Development ==
Zwart hired Icelandic composer Atli Örvarsson to contribute music for the film but was replaced by James Horner in March 2010. After his completion on Avatar (2009), Horner recorded the musical score at the Sony Scoring Stage and utilized ethnic instrumentation from China due to the film's setting and incorporated East Asian musical elements throughout the score. The film's official theme song "Never Say Never", performed by Justin Bieber and Smith and released as a single on June 8, was not included in the soundtrack. The album was released through Madison Gate Records on June 15, 2010.

== Reception ==
Thomas Glorieuz of Maintitles wrote "Like the film, the music is nothing like The Karate Kid of Bill Conti, but it wins its own battles easily enough, this due to James Horner's never failing spirit." Filmtracks.com wrote "If Horner had explored original thematic ideas for The Karate Kid, it would easily be a four-star score." Pete Simons of Synchrotones described the score as "playful" and "colorful".

== Track listing ==
The Karate Kid (Music from the Motion Picture) track listing
No.	Title	Length
1.	"Leaving Detroit"	2:55
2.	"Looking for Mr. Han"	1:29
3.	"Kung Fu Heaven"	1:19
4.	"I Want To Go Home / The Forbidden City"	4:29
5.	"The Lunchroom"	2:29
6.	"Backstreet Beating"	3:34
7.	"Han's Kung Fu"	1:39
8.	"Ancient Chinese Medicine"	1:25
9.	"Beijing Valentine"	1:34
10.	"Mei Ying's Kiss"	3:23
11.	"Jacket On, Jacket Off"	2:32
12.	"Journey to the Spiritual Mountain"	8:49
13.	"Hard Training"	1:20
14.	"All Work and No Play"	1:41
15.	"From Master to Student to Master"	10:33
16.	"Dre's Gift and Apology"	3:07
17.	"Tournament Time"	5:09
18.	"Final Contest"	6:47
Total length:		64:14

== Personnel ==
Credits adapted from CD liner notes.

- Composer – James Horner
- Producer – James Horner, Simon Rhodes
- Synth programming – Ian Underwood
- Arrangements – Simon Franglen
- Digital recordist – Kevin Globerman
- Recording and mixing – Simon Rhodes
- Score editor – Michael Bauer
- Supervising score editor – Jim Henrikson
- Music supervisor – Pilar McCurry
- Album co-ordinator – Tim Ahlering
- Scoring co-ordinator – Sylvia Wells

Orchestra

- Orchestra – The Hollywood Studio Symphony
- Orchestration – J.A.C. Redford, James Horner
- Conductor – James Horner
- Contractor – Peter Rotter, Sandy de Crescent
- Concertmaster – Clayton Haslop
- Music preparation – Bob Bornstein, Emmett Estren

Instrumentation

- Bass – Bruce Morgenthaler, Christian Kollgaard, David Parmeter, Drew D. Dembowski, Edward Meares, Nico Carmine Abondolo, Oscar Hidalgo, Susan Ranney, Michael Valerio
- Bassoon – Kenneth Munday, Michael R. O'Donovan
- Cello – Andrew T. Shulman, Antony Cooke, Armen Ksajikian, Cecelia Tsan, Dennis Karmazyn, George Kim Scholes, John Walz, Paula Hochhalter, Steve Erdody, Timothy Landauer
- Clarinet – Ralph Williams, Gary S. Bovyer
- Flute – Geraldine Rotella, David Shostac
- Harp – Marcia Dickstein, Jo Ann Turovsky
- Horn – Brian D. O'Connor, Daniel P. Kelley, David Duke, Jenny L. Kim, Mark L. Adams, Richard Todd, Steven Becknell, James W. Thatcher
- Oboe – Leslie H. Reed, Barbara Northcutt
- Percussion – Gregory Goodall, Michael Fisher, Peter Limonick, Robert Zimmitti
- Piano – Gloria Cheng, Ian Underwood, Randy Kerber
- Timpani – Donald J. Williams
- Trombone – Alexander Iles, Andrew Thomas Malloy, Robert Sanders, William Booth
- Trumpet – Jon Lewis, Timothy G. Morrison, David Washburn
- Tuba – Doug Tornquist
- Viola – Andrew Duckles, Brian Dembow, Darrin McCann, David F. Walther, Jennie Hansen, Matthew Funes, Robert A. Brophy, Shawn Mann, Steven Gordon, Victoria Miskolczy, Pamela Goldsmith
- Violin – Alan Grunfeld, Alex Shlifer, Ana Landauer, Anatoly Rosinsky, Belinda Broughton, Bruce Dukov, David Ewart, Endre Granat, Eric J. Hosler, Galina Golovin, Haim Shtrum, Jacqueline Brand, James F. Sitterly, Katia Popov, Kenneth Yerke, Kevin Connolly, Mark Robertson, Miran Kojian, Natalie Leggett, Phillip Levy, Radu Pieptea, Rafael Rishik, Rebecca Bunnell, Roberto Cani, Roger Wilkie, Ron Clark, Shalini Vijayan, Sungil Lee, Vladimir Polimatidi, Julie Ann Giganto

== See also ==
- "Never Say Never", the film's original theme song, performed by Justin Bieber and Jaden Smith
