= Never Say Never: The Remixes =

Remix album by Justin Bieber
- Released: February 14, 2011
- Length: 26:47
- Labels: Island; Teen Island; RBMG; Schoolboy
- Producers: Kanye West; The Messengers; Stereotypes; Dirty Swift; Bruce Waynne; Dapo Torimiro; Mel & Mus; Mike Dean; Jan Smith; Brandon "Blue" Hamilton

Justin Bieber chronology
My Worlds Acoustic (2010)	Never Say Never: The Remixes (2011)	Under the Mistletoe (2011)

Singles from Never Say Never: The Remixes
- 1. "Never Say Never" Released: June 8, 2010

Never Say Never: The Remixes is the second remix album by the Canadian singer Justin Bieber. Released on February 14, 2011, the album accompanies the release of Bieber's first film, Justin Bieber: Never Say Never (2011). The album mostly includes remixes of songs from Bieber's first studio album, My World 2.0 (2010), featuring guest appearances from Jaden Smith, Rascal Flatts, Usher, Chris Brown, Kanye West, Raekwon and Miley Cyrus. In addition, a brand-new track is also included. The Jaden Smith-assisted "Never Say Never", originally released as the theme song for the film The Karate Kid (2010), was included on the tracklist and re-released as the album's lead and only single on January 25, 2011.

The album reached number-one on the Billboard 200 albums chart in the United States and was certified Platinum by the Recording Industry Association of America (RIAA), making it Bieber's second number-one album and second Platinum-selling album in the country. Plus it became his fourth consecutive top ten album in the US following his first remix album My Worlds Acoustic (2010).

== Background ==
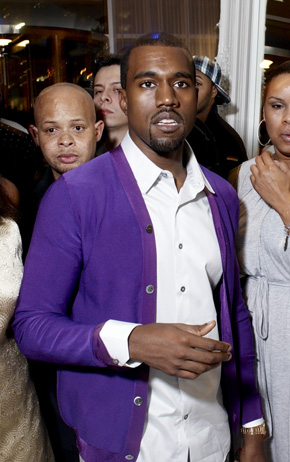
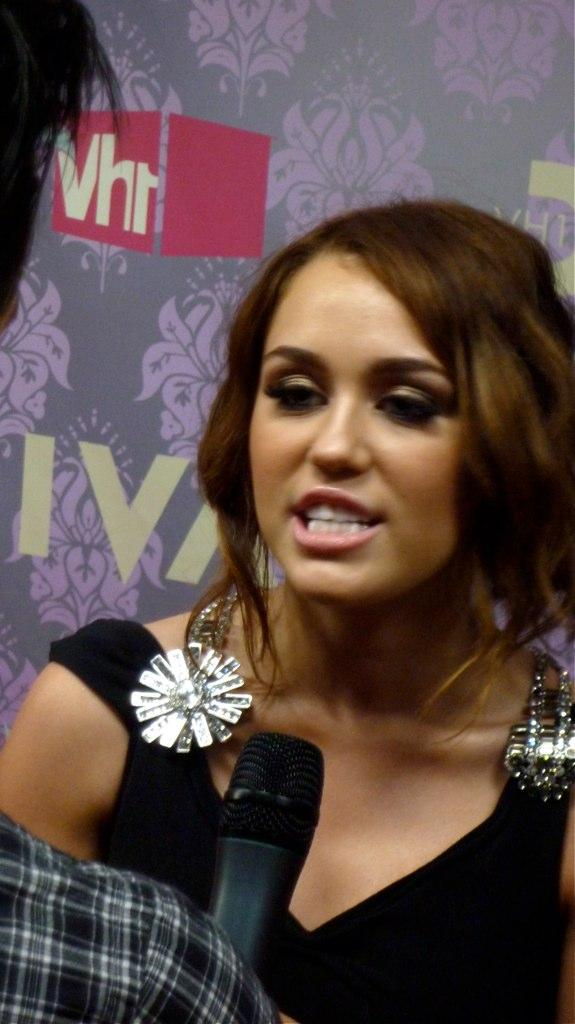
Kanye West (left) and Miley Cyrus (right) are two of the artists that have featured appearances on the album.

In December 2010, Bieber stated that he was collaborating with American country band Rascal Flatts, presumably for his second studio album. In an interview with WSIX, lead singer Gary LeVox said "[Justin] asked us to do a duet with him on his next record. It's actually a really good song! The kid is really talented. He plays five or six different instruments really well." Bieber also confirmed the collaboration in-the-works on Twitter. Also a conversation on Twitter, American R&B singer Chris Brown and Bieber revealed that they were also working together on new music.

In January 2011, it was rumored that Bieber was planning to release an album to accompanying the release of his 3D biopic-concert film, Justin Bieber: Never Say Never. On January 6, 2011, Bieber's manager Scooter Braun held a live chat with fans, stating that new music should be expected from the singer around Valentine's Day. Just after winning a Golden Globe award for the "You Haven't Seen the Last of Me" from the film Burlesque, on January 18, 2011, songwriter Diane Warren confirmed that she had just completed a song, "Born to Be Somebody", to be included on album to support Bieber's new film. Warren said "It's a beautiful song. That's a good age difference between Cher and Justin – 40 years!" Additionally, singer-songwriter Ester Dean confirmed she worked on the project for Bieber's film.

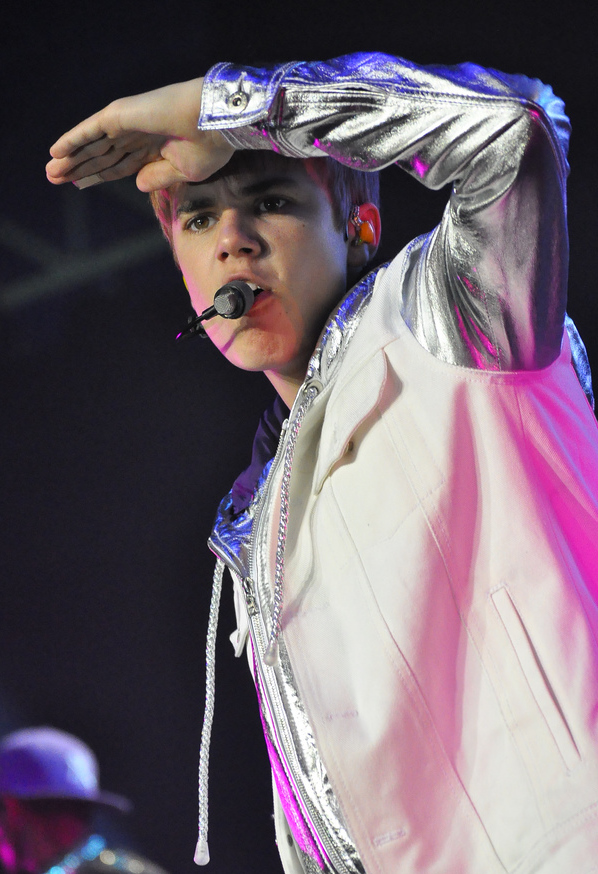
Bieber performing in Manila, Philippines on the My World Tour on May 10, 2011.

On January 31, 2011, the official announcement of a musical counterpart to the film was revealed, and that it would be released on February 14, 2011, the Monday following the film's opening weekend. The album was said to contain the previously released Jaden Smith collaboration and theme song to The Karate Kid, "Never Say Never", as well as the remix of his single "Somebody to Love", which features mentor Usher. A previous intentionally leaked remix of Bieber's "Runaway Love", which was produced by Kanye West, featuring himself and Wu-Tang Clan member Raekwon was also added to the album. New contributions came from Rascal Flatts and Chris Brown adding parts to "That Should Be Me" and "Up", respectively. A live version of Bieber performing "Overboard" alongside fellow pop singer Miley Cyrus on his My World Tour at Madison Square Garden is included as a track. The Diane Warren-penned "Born to Be Somebody" is a previously unheard track on the album, stating that you are born to be whatever you want to be; to "light up the sky like lighting;" to be somebody.

== Critical reception ==
Margaret Wappler of The Los Angeles Times positively reviewed the album, giving it three out of four stars, commenting that the "most savvy quality" of the set was "how many aspects of the pop spectrum it effectively tickles while never corrupting the purity of Bieber's enthusiasm, both cartoon-like and genuine." Wappler also complimented how it satisfied multiple demographics, collaborating with Jaden Smith and Miley Cyrus on the teen spectrum, and Kanye West and Raekwon "to secure street cred with the cool kids," while having "innocence to neutralize whatever sex appeal they court."

Sabrina Cognata of WNOW-FM gave the album a positive review, saying the album "legitimizes the teen dream", writing, "The album may only have seven tracks, but what it lacks in size it makes up for with panache." Cognata appreciated the album's mixture, stating "the album actually has something for all walks of life and not just Beliebers." She highly complimented the Kanye West remix, commenting "Justin Bieber isn't exactly known for being "hard" so the juxtaposition between really edgy hip-hop artists remixed with his bubble gum pop presents an interesting audio voyage that appeals to more than his core audience."

== Commercial performance ==
The album debuted at number one on the US Billboard 200, opening with 179,000 copies in the first week. It marked Bieber's second time at the top of the chart, after debuting at number one with his first studio album, My World 2.0 (released on March 23, 2010). It was also Bieber's fourth consecutive top ten release on the chart, following My World 2.0, and My World (2009), and My Worlds Acoustic, which peaked at numbers 5 and 7, respectively. All four of Bieber's albums appeared in the top forty of Billboard the week Never Say Never – The Remixes debuted, with making Bieber the first artist since American country singer Garth Brooks as of January 1993, to have four albums in those positions on the chart. Likewise, the album was the first remix album in almost a decade, with Jennifer Lopez's J to tha L-O! The Remixes led for two weeks in February 2002. In its second week, the album fell to number 2, with 102,000 copies sold. With My World 2.0 jumping from number 8 to 5 on that week, Bieber is the first artist to have two albums in the top five since he himself achieved it in April 2010. As of July 2011, the album sold 676,000 copies in the United States.

== Track listing ==
No.	Title	Writer(s)	Producer(s)	Length
1.	"Never Say Never" (featuring Jaden Smith)	Adam Messinger; Nasri Atweh; Justin Bieber; Thaddis Harrell; Jaden Smith; Omarr Rambert	The Messengers; Kuk Harrell (voc.)	3:48
2.	"That Should Be Me" (featuring Rascal Flatts)	Atweh; Messinger; Luke Boyd; Bieber	The Messengers; Harrell (voc.)	3:51
3.	"Somebody to Love (Remix)" (featuring Usher)	Jonathan Yip; Jeremy Reeves; Ray Romulus; Heather Bright	Stereotypes; Harrell (voc.)	3:40
4.	"Up" (featuring Chris Brown)	Atweh; Messinger; Bieber	The Messengers; Harrell (voc.)	3:56
5.	"Overboard" (live; featuring Miley Cyrus)	Waynne Nugent; Kevin Risto; Dapo Torimiro; Taurian Shropshire; Bieber	Dirty Swift; Bruce Waynne; Torimiro; Harrell (voc.)	5:08
6.	"Runaway Love" (Kanye West remix; featuring Kanye West and Raekwon)	Melvin Hough II; Rivelino Wouter; Timothy Thomas; Theron Thomas; Bieber; Dalvin DeGrate; Kanye West; Donald DeGrate; Dennis Coles; Robert Diggs; Gary Grice; Lamont Hawkins; Isaac Hayes; Jason Hunter; Russell Jones; David Porter; Clifford Smith; Corey Woods; Rakeem Prince	Mel & Mus; West; Mike Dean; Harrell (voc.)	4:47
7.	"Born to Be Somebody"	Diane Warren	Jan Smith; Brandon "Blue" Hamilton; Harrell (voc.)	3:01
Total length:				37:47

European bonus track
No.	Title	Writer(s)	Producer(s)	Length
2.	"Stuck in the Moment" (featuring Tyga)	Yip; Reeves; Romulus; Dan August Rigo; Bieber	Stereotypes; Harrell (voc.)	4:33
Total length:				4:33

Japanese bonus tracks
No.	Title	Writer(s)	Producer(s)	Length
8.	"Stuck in the Moment" (featuring Tyga)	Yip; Reeves; Romulus; Rigo; Bieber	Stereotypes; Harrell (voc.)	4:33
9.	"One Time" (J-Stax remix)	Christopher "Tricky" Stewart; James Bunton; Corron Cole; Thabiso Nkhereanye	The Movement; Stewart; Harrell (voc.)	6:46
Total length:				4:33

Note

- "Runaway Love" contains interpolations from "Wu-Tang Clan Ain't Nuthing ta Fuck Wit" (1993) by the Wu-Tang Clan and "Freek'n You (Remix)" (1995) by Jodeci.

== Charts ==
=== Weekly charts ===
Weekly chart performance
Chart (2011)	Peak position
Australian Albums (ARIA)	15
Canadian Albums (Billboard)	1
Czech Albums (ČNS IFPI)	25
Danish Albums (Hitlisten)	25
French Albums (SNEP)	71
German Albums (Offizielle Top 100)	72
Irish Albums (IRMA)	10
Italian Albums (FIMI)	20
Japanese Albums (Oricon)	49
Mexican Albums (Top 100 Mexico)	8
New Zealand Albums (RMNZ)	14
Polish Albums (ZPAV)	49
Portuguese Albums (AFP)	18
Scottish Albums (Official Charts)	20
South Korean Albums (Circle)	20
Spanish Albums (Promusicae)	5
Swiss Albums (Schweizer Hitparade)	61
UK Albums (Official Charts)	17
US Billboard 200	1

=== Year-end charts ===
Year-end chart performance
Chart (2011)	Position
Australian Albums (ARIA)	96
Canadian Albums (Billboard)	33
Mexican Albums (Top 100 Mexico)	55
US Billboard 200	28

== Certifications and sales ==
Certifications and sales
Region	Certification	Certified units/sales
Brazil (Pro-Música Brasil)	Platinum	40,000^{*}
Canada (Music Canada)	Platinum	80,000^{^}
Denmark (IFPI Danmark)	Gold	10,000^{‡}
GCC (IFPI Middle East)	Gold	3,000^{*}
New Zealand (RMNZ)	Gold	7,500^{‡}
United States (RIAA)	Platinum	1,000,000^{^}
^{*} Sales figures based on certification alone.^{^} Shipments figures based on certification alone.^{‡} Sales+streaming figures based on certification alone.
