= Pray (Justin Bieber song) =

Single by Justin Bieber

from the album My Worlds Acoustic
- Released: December 9, 2010
- Recorded: July 2010
- Genre: CCM
- Length: 3:32
- Label: Island; RBMG
- Songwriters: Adam Messinger; Nasri Atweh; Omar Martinez; Justin Bieber
- Producer: The Messengers

Justin Bieber singles chronology
"U Smile" (2010)	"Pray" (2010)	"Next to You" (2011)

Music video
- "Pray" on YouTube

"Pray" is a song by Canadian singer Justin Bieber. The song was written by Bieber along with Omar Martinez, and Adam Messinger and Nasri of the Messengers, with the latter duo producing the track. The song is taken as a single in several European countries from his first compilation album, My Worlds: The Collection. In the United States and Canada, the song is included on My Worlds Acoustic. According to Bieber, he was inspired by Michael Jackson's "Man in the Mirror" (1988) when writing the song. The song is a contemporary Christian song, using a world music backdrop. It primarily features acoustic instruments, but it does make minor usage of electronic sounds.

"Pray" received generally positive reviews, with critics appreciating the message portrayed in the song. It reached the lower half on the singles charts in Germany and Austria, and charted in several regions where it was not released as a single such as the United States and Australia. The song's music video premiered on Facebook on December 11, 2010. The video, which also has religious undertones, features clips of places affected by natural disasters, sick children, possessed homes, and more, which are intercut with Bieber performing. Bieber debuted and performed the song on the American Music Awards, accompanied by a full choir.

== Background and composition ==
"Pray"
A sample of "Pray", which sees Bieber singing in a lower key than any of his previous work.

"Pray" was written by Justin Bieber, Omar Martinez and Adam Messinger and Nasri Atweh of the Messengers. While Bieber was being interviewed by Ryan Seacrest on his radio show, Bieber talked about the song's initial writing, stating the song was influenced by Michael Jackson. Bieber elaborated, "It's a very uplifting song, very motivational. It definitely comes from the heart. It's very beautiful. I definitely thought of Michael [Jackson's] 'Man in the Mirror' when I was writing it." The song was released as a CD single in Germany on December 3, 2010. "Pray" is a mid-tempo song that uses a "world-music beat" as a backing. According to the sheet music published at Musicnotes.com by Universal Music Group, "Pray" is set in common time with a tempo of 80 beats per minute. It is composed in the key of B major with Bieber's vocal range spanning from the low-note of F♯_{3} to the high-note of B_{4}. The song follows in the chord progression of B/G♯–B/F♯–E–B.

Present throughout the song's background is the use of violins and a choir, as well as guitar, other string instruments, congas and a cajon. However it does make subtle use of synths and electronic sounds. Musically and lyrically, it is influenced by Contemporary Christian music, and has a gospel feel. The song opens with Bieber singing, "And I pray" over a keyboard, while the song's chorus repeats one simple refrain, "I close my eyes and I can see a better day/ I close my eyes and pray." In the lyrics, Bieber "recognizes the pain and suffering in the world" and then offers "a passive solution" through lines such as "Children are crying / soldiers are dying / Some people don't have a home," before compromising, "I know there's sunshine beyond that rain / good times beyond that pain." Vocally, Bieber's vocals are sung in a lower key compared to previous singles.

== Critical reception ==
The song received positive reviews from critics, who praised its message and composition. Referring to the song as a "junior varsity" take on "Man in the Mirror", Allison Stewart of Washington Post said, "as an indicator of the Bieb's awakening social consciousness, it's a good start." Melinda Newman of HitFix called the song a "lovely testament to the power of prayer," commenting that it was "for True Believers, not just True Beliebers" Calling it Bieber's "Man in the Mirror" moment, Newman also said while it did not have the "staying power or resonance of the Michael Jackson classic," she said the themes of how to effect change were the same. Lucy Jones of The Daily Telegraph noted the song as a recommended download from the album. Dan Savoie of Rockstar Weekly said the song "is a more advanced lyric and shows a more political side to the young singer, but the gospel feel of the song really works with his voice." Savoie went on to say "The song just moved Bieber from the category of pop child star to responsible young man." Monica Herrera of Billboard wrote that the song was "a treacly but well-meaning ballad that taps into Bieber's spiritual beliefs." Katie Amoroso of ReviewStream.com writes, "The song itself is less poppy and more natural than other Justin songs and shows strong musical talent. Many have commented that the song made them emotional...promotes deep thought on our impact on the world"

== Chart performance ==
"Pray" was only released as a single in select European countries and had moderate success. On the Belgian Flanders Tip chart, the song charted at number five, while on the Belgian Tip chart for Wallonia, the song charted at number fifteen. On the Austrian Singles Chart, "Pray" peaked at number sixty-five, spending a week on the chart. "Pray" debuted at fifty-one on the German Singles Chart, and spent eight weeks on the chart. Despite not being released as a single in these countries, due to sales after the digital releases of My Worlds: The Collection and My Worlds Acoustic, "Pray" debuted at number ninety-four on the Australian Singles Chart, and number 112 on the UK Singles Chart. It also debuted at number ninety-one in the US Billboard Hot 100 and reached number sixty-one the following week.

== Music video ==
In the music video, Bieber highlights several social injustices around the world. Clips are shown from footage of earthquake-torn Haiti, a suffering post-Hurricane Katrina New Orleans and Bieber himself visiting sick children in hospital beds. More scenes feature military soldiers being reunited with their families, and homes being possessed because families cannot pay mortgage. The video is intercut with scenes of Bieber performing. Like the song itself, the video also includes religious undertones, including the video ending with the quote, "God speaks in the silence of the heart. Listening is the beginning of prayer." Bill Lamb of About.com likened the video to the saying, "There are times when putting pictures to the words does indeed make a song more powerful than simply listening to the track." Calling the video "outstanding for the holiday season" Lamb said the theme of "bringing hope and joy into the lives of others" related to "the celebrations that bring all of us together in hope for a brighter future for our world."

== Live performance ==
"Pray" debuted and was performed for the first time at the 2010 American Music Awards. The performance opened with Bieber sitting playing the piano while singing. Midway through the performance Bieber arose from the piano and took center stage, he was accompanied by a choir singing background vocals. The performance was ended with Bieber kneeling singing the song's title, the performance was greeted by standing ovation from the audience. Despite Bieber's significant voice crack during the performance, it received a generally positive reception. According to Jocelyn Vena of MTV News Bieber, "threw in that showmanship that's made him famous." Thomas Conner of Chicago Sun-Times noted Bieber as the standout performance of the night, saying it was proof that he could sing, besting "the wavering pitches" of Taylor Swift and Miley Cyrus.

== Track listing ==
CD single
No.	Title	Length
1.	"Pray"
2.	"U Smile" (acoustic version)

== Charts ==
Chart (2011)	Peak position
Australia (ARIA)	94
Austria (Ö3 Austria Top 40)	63
Belgium (Ultratip Bubbling Under Flanders)	5
Belgium (Ultratip Bubbling Under Wallonia)	15
Germany (GfK)	51
UK Singles (The Official Charts Company)	112
US Billboard Hot 100	61

== Certifications ==
Region	Certification	Certified units/sales
Brazil (Pro-Música Brasil)	Gold	30,000^{‡}
Canada (Music Canada)	Gold	40,000^{‡}
Norway (IFPI Norway)	Gold	5,000^{*}
United States (RIAA)	Platinum	1,000,000^{‡}
^{*} Sales figures based on certification alone.^{‡} Sales+streaming figures based on certification alone.
