= My World (Bryn Christopher album) =

Studio album by Bryn Christopher
- Released: 8 September 2008
- Genre: R&B; soul; jazz
- Length: 44:29
- Label: Polydor
- Producer: Jarrad Rogers; Midi Mafia

Singles from My World
- 1. "The Quest" Released: June 8, 2008; 2. "Smilin'" Released: September 1, 2008; 3. "Fearless" Released: January 19, 2009; 4. "Taken Me Over" Released: August 4, 2009 (Digital Only)

My World is the debut studio album released by Bryn Christopher. It was released in the United Kingdom on 8 September 2008. It charted in the top 20 in the UK.

== Track listing ==
No.	Title	Writer(s)	Length
1.	"Help Me" (feat. Bruce Waynne)	Bryn Christopher; Wayne Nugent; Kevin Risto; Niara Scarlett	4:02
2.	"Smilin'"	Christopher; Jarrad Rogers; Ricki-Lee Coulter; Scarlett	3:45
3.	"Sour Times"	Geoff Barrow; Beth Gibbons; Adrian Utley; Lalo Schifrin	3:09
4.	"Stay With Me"	Christopher; Rogers	3:21
5.	"The Quest"	Christopher; Rogers	3:44
6.	"My World"	Christopher; Sylvia Bennet Smith; Christian Ballard; Andy Murray	2:50
7.	"Found A New Love"	Christopher; Rogers	3:44
8.	"Seconds Ago"	Christopher; Rogers	3:07
9.	"The Way You Are"	Christopher; Ballard; Murray; Russ Ballard; Brian Harris	4:23
10.	"Gone Gone Gone"	Christopher; Rogers	3:43
11.	"My Kinda Woman" (contains the bonus track "Talen Me Over")	Christopher; Steve McCutcheon; Wayne Hector	8:41

=== B-Sides ===
No.	Title	Length
1.	"Waiting For..." ("The Quest" 7" B-Side)	3:27
2.	"How Did You Know" ("Smilin'" B-Side)	3:22
3.	"Cry Cry Cry" ("Fearless" E-Video Bundle)	3:23

== Samples ==
- "Help Me" contains a sample from "Hot Dog" performed by The Four Shells, and written by Billy Harper, Charles Calvin, James Calvin and Willie James Exon.
- "Found A New Love" contains a sample from "I'm Going Home" performed and written by Prince Conley.

== Credits ==
=== Performers ===
- Bryn Christopher – vocals, background vocals (track 11)
- Bruce Waynne – featuring vocals (track 1)
- Niara Scarlett – additional vocals (tracks 1, 7)
- Ricki-Lee Coulter – background vocals (track 2)
- Wayne Hector – background vocals (track 11)
- Jarrad Rogers – background vocals (track 2), bass (except track 5), guitar (except track 11), keyboards (except track 11), brass (except track 11), strings (except track 11), drums (except tracks 4, 5, 11), piano (tracks 5, 12), wurlitzer (tracks 9, 12)
- Jony Rockstar – drums and percussion (track 5)
- Jim Hunt – brass and strings (tracks 3, 6, 9)
- Damian Rogers – drums and percussion (track 4)
- Tim Hutton – bass and additional horns (track 5)
- Dave Arch – strings and horn arrangements (track 11), piano (track 11)
- Steve Mac – piano and keyboards (track 11)
- Ralph Salmins – drums (track 11)
- Chris Laws – drums (track 11)
- Daniel Pursey – percussion (track 11)
- Julian Leaper – violin (track 11)
- Rolf Wilson – violin (track 11)
- Boguslaw Kostecki – violin (track 11)
- Roger Garland – violin (track 11)
- John Paricelli – guitar (track 11)
- Peter Lale – viola (track 11)
- Anthony Pleeth – cello (track 11)
- Derek Watkins – trumpet (track 11)
- Simon Gardner – trumpet (track 11)
- Phil Todd – tenor saxophone (track 11)
- Dave Bishop – baritone saxophone (track 11)
- Jamie Talbot – alto saxophone (track 11)

=== Production and recording ===
- Jarrad Rogers – producer (except tracks 1, 7), mixing (tracks 4, 8, 10, 12), programming (tracks 2, 12)
- Midi Mafia – producer (tracks 1, 7), mixing (track 7)
- Jony Rockstar – additional producer & mixing (track 5)
- Ash Howes – mixing (track 1)
- Pete Craigie – mixing (track 5)
- Tom Elmhirst – mixing (tracks 2, 3, 6, 9, 11)

== Charts ==
Chart (2008)	Peak position	Sales	Certification
UK Albums Chart	18	—	—
