= Somebody to Love (Justin Bieber song) =

- Remix single

Single by Justin Bieber featuring Usher

from the album My World 2.0, Never Say Never: The Remixes, and Versus
- B-side: "Where Are You Now" "Never Say Never"
- Released: June 25, 2010
- Recorded: 2010
- Studio: Short Bus Studios (North Hollywood, California)
- Genre: Pop; dance
- Length: 3:40 (My World 2.0 version); 3:44 (remix featuring Usher); 3:28 (Versus version); 3:34 (J-Stax remix)
- Label: Island, RBMG
- Songwriters: Justin Bieber; Heather Bright; Jonathan Yip; Ray Romulus; Jeremy Reeves
- Producer: The Stereotypes

Justin Bieber singles chronology
"Never Say Never" (2010)	"Somebody to Love" (2010)	"U Smile" (2010)

Usher singles chronology
"There Goes My Baby" (2010)	"Somebody to Love" (remix) (2010)	"DJ Got Us Fallin' in Love" (2010)

Music video
- "Somebody to Love" (remix) on YouTube

"Somebody to Love" is a song by Canadian singer Justin Bieber featuring American singer Usher. The song served as the second single from Bieber's first studio album My World 2.0. It was written by Heather Bright and the Stereotypes, and produced by the latter. The song was originally recorded as a demo by Usher, who was Bieber's mentor, for his sixth studio album, Raymond v. Raymond (2010). After things went stale with Usher's management, The Stereotypes were encouraged to give the song to Bieber, who recorded it, with Usher performing background vocals. The song is an upbeat pop song, which also derives from R&B genre, while making use of Eurodisco influences. It impacted US mainstream and rhythmic radio on April 20, 2010. The remix of the song featuring Usher was featured on Bieber's first compilation album My Worlds: The Collection and his second remix album Never Say Never: The Remixes.

Usher re-recorded featured vocals for the official remix of the song, which was released on June 25, 2010. A variation of the track with slightly different production done by Benny Blanco, features Usher on lead vocals and Bieber as the featured artist. It is included on the follow-up release of Raymond v. Raymond, titled Versus. In Japan, the song was released dually with "Never Say Never" as a double A-side single. The song received positive reviews, with critics complimenting the track's dance feel, and the lyrical content. "Somebody to Love" became Bieber's third consecutive top ten hit in Canada, and his fourth consecutive top twenty single in the United States. It also reached the top ten in Israel and Japan and the top twenty in Germany, New Zealand and Australia.

The accompanying music video for the official remix, directed by Dave Meyers, was intended to rely solely on choreography, and integrate different styles of dance. It features appearances from several dance crews, such as Beat Freaks and Poreotics. According to critics, the video makes allusions to previous dance-heavy clips by Usher and Chris Brown. Bieber performed the song at a number of venues, including the 2010 MTV Video Music Awards and on the seventh series of The X Factor in the United Kingdom.

== Background ==
In a Q&A with Rap-Up, Jonathan Yip of the Stereotypes confirmed that record was originally made for Usher, but things did not go through correctly with his label management. According to Yip, Perez Hilton was the one who recommended the song for Bieber, and after that the producers agreed. Yip said that Usher's label, Jive Records, "wasn't sure what they wanted to do with the record for Usher", so they contacted Bieber's manager, Scooter Braun, and Bieber was able to record the track. On the remix, Yip commented, "Usher's now back on the record, on the remix, so we can't really complain." A variation of the track with slightly different production, featuring Usher as lead vocalist and Bieber as the guest vocalist, is included on a follow-up release to his sixth studio album, titled Versus. The Versus version of the song was produced by Benny Blanco.

== Composition and critical reception ==
'Somebody to Love'
A sample of "Somebody to Love", which features as "thumping Eurodisco beats"

"Somebody to Love" is a pop and dance song. Bieber's R&B vocals are blended throughout the song. The song also integrates elements of Euro disco. Set it common time, the song is written in the key of G minor, and Bieber's vocals span from the low note of G_{3} to high note of C_{5}. It follows the basic chord progression of Cm7–B♭–F.

The song has been described by Jocelyn Vena of MTV News as a "dance track in which he professes his love for a girl and tells her he'd do anything for her" and a "club-friendly pop tune." Jody Rosen of Rolling Stone said the song was a "thumping Eurodisco." Lauren Carter of the Boston Herald called the track "fun and upbeat" and said, "is a standout and the track to download – give listeners time to dance or daydream, as the case may be."

Fraser McAlpine of BBC Music wrote that "'Somebody to Love' is a straightforward plea for a soul mate; it says something we've all felt." Monica Herrera of Billboard commented, "'Somebody to Love' offers the clearest evidence yet that he's more than capable of clearing the hurdle from teen to adult stardom."

== Chart performance ==
In the United States, "Somebody to Love" entered the Billboard Hot 100 chart at number ninety-eight. After weeks of steadily ascending the charts, the single reached a peak of fifteen on the issue week July 17, 2010. The song received digital sales after the release of My World 2.0, propelling it to debut at ninety-four on the Canadian Hot 100. The song fell off the chart the following week and re-entered on the week of June 12, 2010 at its previous peak of ninety-one. After re-entering and steadily ascending the charts, the single reached a new peak of ten on the week issued July 3, 2010. It also peaked at twenty and thirty-six on the US Pop Songs chart and US Latin Pop Songs, respectively.

The song performed well in several international markets. "Somebody to Love" entered the UK Singles Chart at forty-seven on the issue date of June 6, 2010. The following week the song fell to position sixty-two. In the succeeding week the single reached thirty-three where it reached its peak. In Australia, "Somebody to Love" entered the chart at forty-seven on the week of July 5, 2010. The following week, the single rose to its peak position of number twenty. On the Japan Hot 100, the song peaked within the top ten, at number three. "Somebody to Love" also peaked within the top twenty in Germany and New Zealand, the top thirty of Austria, and elsewhere in Switzerland and on the Belgian charts. Its numerous chartings in Europe allowed the song to peak at number thirty-three on the European Hot 100.

== Music video ==
=== Background ===
Bieber performing jerkin'-esque choreography with dancers and in a scene with a calligraphy backdrop and flame outline with Usher

The music video for the official remix version featuring Usher was filmed during the week of May 9, 2010, directed by Dave Meyers. The video was choreographed by Jamaica Craft, notable for her work with choreography on videos for Usher and Ciara. Rather than a storyline as in Bieber's previous videos, the video focuses on a dance and choreography aspect. Meyers stated that he wanted the video to be more playful, stating,

We're bringing Justin into the world of dance on this one, giving Justin the chance to integrate to different styles of dance. So we kind of kept it simple with the art direction, just real graphic and really highlighting the dance. No big story lines, no crowds of people, just real clean.

A preview of the video was posted on AOL's PopEater.com, and subsequently on Bieber's VEVO channel, including behind the scenes clips of Bieber with the dancers, and highlights of the video with Usher and in front of a green screen. Bieber said, "It's really awesome to be able to work with professional dancers, you know, people that were in, like, ABDC, and also got an approval from choreographer Jamaica, who said Bieber was "killing it" and that she didn't have to give him any corrections. It made its premiere during the June 17, 2010 results show of the seventh season of So You Think You Can Dance, and was introduced by Usher after his performance of "OMG". It later premiered that night on VEVO and on June 18, 2010, on 20/20 at the end of their show. The video features dance crews including, America's Best Dance Crew season 5 winners Poreotics, and Season 3's runner up Beat Freaks, as well as The Syrenz, LXD, Medea Sirkas, solo acts Simrin Player and Bboy Fly, and other dancers and crews. Singer/actress and model Katerina Graham makes a cameo in a scene with Poreotics. Bieber's best friend Ryan Butler, who appeared in the "One Time" video, also appears alongside Bieber, wearing a T-shirt advertising his Twitter account. According to Tamar Antai of MTV News the video "makes vague allusions" to clips for Busta Rhymes' "Pass the Courvoisier, Part II" and Chris Brown's "Wall to Wall". A backpack choreography scene with LXD recalls Usher's 1997 video for "You Make Me Wanna".

=== Synopsis and reception ===
The video features Bieber dancing along several dance crews along a black backdrop, and a scene with ninjas and a flame outline. The video begins with Bieber dancing with different members of the crews with use of a spotlight effect, followed by Bieber being flaunted by a single female dancer. Then the video cuts to Bieber performing Stepping (African-American)-style choreography with two male dancers, shirtless with red hats and red suspenders. With the aid of smoke, the video moves to Bieber dancing with Beat Freaks. Usher sings his verse along with The Syrenz as dancers in a room with metal chandeliers before uniting with Bieber dancing in the scene aided by Poreotics. Then Bieber and Usher sing and dance with Medea Sirkas in ninja attire in front of a background of Chinese calligraphy ("Love") and flames, before returning to the black backdrop and metal chandeliers as Bieber dances with Simrin Player and LXD in a scene with bookbags. The ending features Bieber and several of the dancers featured performing group choreography before cutting to Bieber and Usher with the in front of the calligraphy and flames.

Monica Herrera of Billboard said Usher's "star power is clearly rubbing off on the 16-year-old", commenting that Bieber "shows off his smoothest moves yet " and "tackles his toughest choreography." Jocelyn Vena of MTV News commented, "While Bieber had previously teased his dancing skills in the "Baby" video, he really channeled Usher's smooth moves in this newest clip." Tamar Antai also of MTV said, "Usher does most of the heavy lifting where dancing is concerned, and Justin Bieber, who's more of a singer than a dancer, is in no danger of upstaging Usher on the dance floor." Antai compared Bieber's moves to Usher in his "Caught Up" video, commenting "it's nice to see Justin expanding the scope of talents to include pelvic thrusts, Matrix-style slo-mo leans" and, "it's also nice to see Justin looking a little more mature and sophisticated in a hoodie and leather jacket....and his videos are growing up with him, as this is his flashiest, most grandiose video yet. Antai also commented on the appeal of the video, commending Meyers, "who put that classic early '00s-style big-money polish on the piece – for employing fire, shirtless dudes, white ninjas..."

== Live performances ==
Bieber performed "Somebody to Love" on multiple occasions, including as a part of his set list on the My World Tour. On most televised performances the song was performed alongside "Baby" and more of his previous songs. He performed the song at a number of venues, in Wales at Radio 1's Big Weekend on May 22, 2010. Additionally Bieber performed it on Today with "Baby" and "One Time" on June 4, 2010 He performed the song with "Baby," assisted by Drake on June 21, 2010, at the 2010 MuchMusic Video Awards. The song was performed with "Baby" at Macy's Fourth of July Fireworks Spectacular on July 4, 2010.

"Somebody to Love" was also performed with "U Smile" and "Baby" at the 2010 MTV Video Music Awards on September 12, 2010, accompanied by a full dance team and band. For the performance, Bieber, donning a black and red letter jacket and a '50s style cardigan, drove into the Nokia Theater in a 1957 red Chevrolet car, and was chased by girls (paying homage to The Beatles' "A Hard Day's Night." He then proceeded to perform "U Smile" as an introduction, followed by "Baby" and "Somebody to Love", which had dance parts in which his background dancers wore the same attire as him. During the "Somebody to Love" performance Bieber and backup dancers performed an elaborate dance routine including younger children, which was followed by a drum solo by the singer. During the performance of the song, black and red confetti fell from the sky. Critics appreciated the performance, with a Jocelyn Vena of MTV News calling Bieber a "triple threat." "Baby" and "Somebody to Love" were performed by Bieber on the seventh series of The X Factor in the United Kingdom on November 28, 2010.

== Glee version ==
The song was covered in the thirteenth episode of the second season of Glee, "Comeback". It was performed by the characters Sam, Artie, Puck, and Mike, in their attempts to emulate Bieber's mannerisms to reignite their girlfriends' interest in them. The performance bared similarities to the song's music video and Bieber's dance moves.

== Track listing ==
- European Promo CD
1. "Somebody to Love" – 3:40
2. "Somebody to Love" (Remix featuring Usher) – 3:43
- UK Digital Download Single
1. "Somebody To Love" – 3:40
2. "Where Are You Now" – 4:27
- Japanese CD Single (Version B)
1. "Somebody to Love" (Remix featuring Usher) – 3:43
2. "Never Say Never" (featuring Jaden Smith) – 3:49
3. "Somebody to Love" (Remix featuring Usher) [Instrumental] – 3:41
4. "Somebody to Love" (Remix featuring Usher) [Video: Making Of]

== Credits and personnel ==
- Songwriting – Heather Bright, Jonathan Yip, Ray Romulus, Jeremy Reeves
- Production – Jonathan Yip, Ray Romulus, Jeremy Reeves
- Background vocals – Usher (also lead vocals in Remix Version)
- Mixing – Jaycen Joshua, assisted by Giancarlo Lino
- Engineering – additional by Pat Thrall

== Charts ==
=== Weekly charts ===
Chart (2010–2011)	Peak position
Australia (ARIA)	20
Austria (Ö3 Austria Top 40)	35
Belgium (Ultratop 50 Flanders)	43
Belgium (Ultratip Bubbling Under Wallonia)	15
Canada Hot 100 (Billboard)	10
Canada CHR/Top 40 (Billboard)	33
Canada Hot AC (Billboard)	46
European Hot 100 Singles (Billboard)	33
Germany (GfK)	16
Ireland (IRMA)	33
Israel International Airplay (Media Forest)	10
Japan (Japan Hot 100)	3
Mexico (Billboard Mexican Airplay)	48
New Zealand (Recorded Music NZ)	12
Scottish Singles Sales (Official Charts)	31
Spain (Airplay Chart)	19
Sweden (Sverigetopplistan)	54
UK Singles (Official Charts)	33
US Billboard Hot 100	15
US Pop Airplay (Billboard)	20
US Rhythmic Airplay (Billboard)	21

=== Year-end charts ===
Chart (2010)	Position
Canada (Canadian Hot 100)	87

Chart (2011)	Position
Brazil (Crowley)	45

== Certifications ==
Region	Certification	Certified units/sales
Australia (ARIA)	Platinum	70,000^{‡}
Australia (ARIA) Remix version	Platinum	70,000^{‡}
Brazil (Pro-Música Brasil)	3× Platinum	180,000^{‡}
Brazil (Pro-Música Brasil) Remix version	3× Platinum	180,000^{‡}
Denmark (IFPI Danmark)	Gold	45,000^{‡}
New Zealand (RMNZ)	2× Platinum	60,000^{‡}
Norway (IFPI Norway)	Platinum	10,000^{*}
United Kingdom (BPI)	Gold	400,000^{‡}
United States (RIAA)	3× Platinum	3,000,000^{‡}
^{*} Sales figures based on certification alone.^{‡} Sales+streaming figures based on certification alone.

== Release history ==
Region	Date	Version	Format
United States	May 20, 2010	Album version	Mainstream; rhythmic airplay
Canada	May 24, 2010	Album version	Top 40, AC airplay
United Kingdom	May 31, 2010	Album version	CD single
New Zealand	June 25, 2010	Official remix	Digital download
United States	June 29, 2010	Official remix	
United States	June 29, 2010	Official remix	Digital download; Urban airplay
Japan	August 18, 2010	Official remix	CD single
