= The Messengers (producers) =

Canadian songwriting and production team

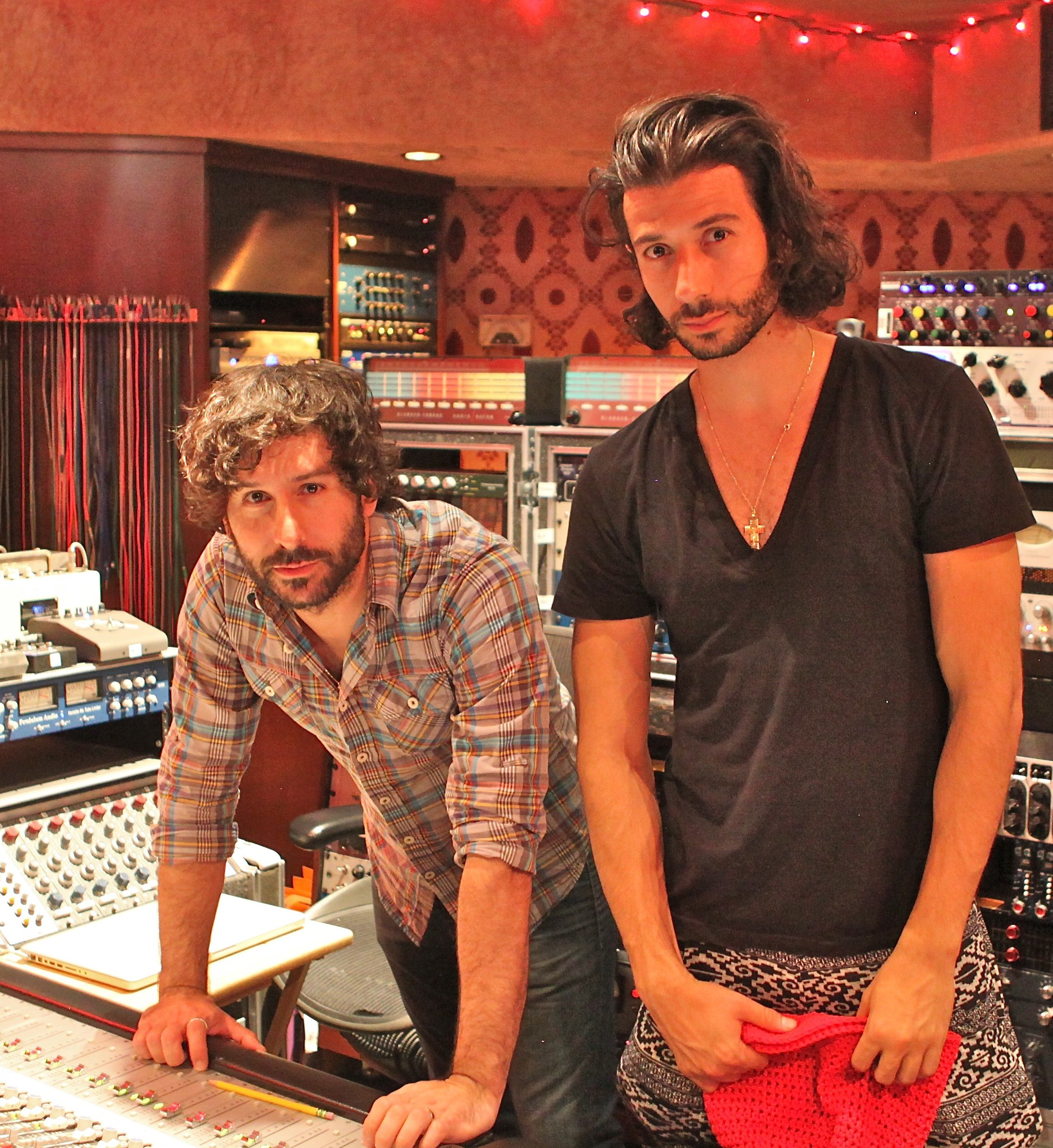

Background information
- Genres: Pop; R&B
- Occupations: Musicians; record producers; songwriters
- Members: Nasri Atweh; Adam Messinger

The Messengers are a Canadian songwriting and production team currently based in Los Angeles. The duo consists of singer and lyricist Nasri Atweh and multi-instrumentalist and arranger Adam Messinger.

They have written, produced, and performed instrumentation and/or background vocals with artists such as Justin Bieber, Shakira, Halsey, Pitbull, Christina Aguilera, Chris Brown, Michael Bolton, Iggy Azalea, Cody Simpson, Lea Michele, The Wanted, Jason Derulo, Kris Allen, Prince Royce, JoJo, Vanessa Hudgens, Big Time Rush, Elliott Yamin, No Angels and New Kids on the Block. Their work has resulted in three Grammy Award nominations for 2011 Best Pop Vocal Album – Justin Bieber (My World 2.0), 2011 Best Contemporary R&B Album – Chris Brown (Graffiti), and a win for 2012 Best R&B Album – Chris Brown (FAME). As well, their collaboration between Justin Bieber and Rascal Flatts "That Should Be Me" won a 2011 CMT Music Award for Best Collaborative Video.

== Partial discography ==
- Halsey – Fifty Shades Darker: Original Motion Picture Soundtrack (Universal Studios / Republic)
  - "Not Afraid Anymore"
- Shakira – Shakira (Sony/RCA)
  - "You Don't Care About Me"
  - "Cut Me Deep" (featuring Magic!)
  - "The One Thing"
- Iggy Azalea – The New Classic (Island / Def Jam)
  - "Change Your Life" (featuring T.I.)
- Pitbull – Global Warming (Mr. 305 / RCA)
  - "Feel This Moment" (featuring Christina Aguilera)
  - "Hope We Meet Again" (featuring Chris Brown)
- Justin Bieber – Believe (Island / Def Jam)
  - "All Around the World"
  - "Believe"
  - "Just Like Them"
- Chris Brown – Fortune (RCA)
  - "Don't Judge Me"
  - "Your World"
- Lea Michele – Louder (Columbia)
  - "Burn With You"
- The Wanted – Word of Mouth (Island)
  - "We Own the Night"
- Justin Bieber – (Island / Def Jam)
  - "Turn to You (Mother's Day Dedication)"
- Justin Bieber – Under the Mistletoe (Island / Def Jam)
  - "Mistletoe"
  - "Christmas Love"
- Justin Bieber – Never Say Never – The Remixes (Island / Def Jam)
  - "Never Say Never"
  - "That Should Be Me (featuring Rascal Flatts)"
  - "Up (featuring Chris Brown)"
- Chris Brown – FAME (Jive)
  - "Next 2 You"
- Cody Simpson – Paradise (Atlantic)
  - "Paradise"
  - "I Love Girls"
- Justin Bieber – My Worlds Acoustic (Island / Def Jam)
  - "Pray"
  - "Never Say Never"
  - "That Should Be Me"
- Justin Bieber – The Karate Kid (Columbia Pictures)
  - "Never Say Never"
- Justin Bieber – My World 2.0 (Island / Def Jam)
  - "Up"
  - "That Should Be Me"
- Chris Brown – Graffiti (Jive)
  - "Crawl"
- The Script – Freedom Child (Columbia)
  - "Arms Open"
- Kris Allen – (19 Entertainment/RCA)
  - The Vision of Love (2012)
- Chloe x Halle – The Kids Are Alright (Parkwood/Columbia)
  - "Happy Without Me"
- Sabrina Claudio – Fifty Shades Freed: Original Motion Picture Soundtrack (Universal Studios / Republic)
  - "Cross Your Mind"
- Sabrina Claudio – "Don't Let Me Down (featuring Khalid)"
- Cody Simpson – Coast to Coast (Atlantic)
  - "Not Just You"
  - "Angel"
  - "On My Mind"
- New Kids on the Block – The Block (Interscope)
  - "Stare at You"
  - "Close To You"
  - "Summertime": Vocal production, mixing
  - "Single" (featuring Ne-Yo) : Vocal production, mixing
  - "Click Click Click": Vocal production
  - "Lights Camera Action": Vocal production
  - "One Song": Vocal production
- Michael Bolton – One World One Love (Universal Motown)
  - "Ready for You"
  - "You Comfort Me"
  - "My Lady"
  - "Sign Your Name"
  - "Need You To Fall"
  - "Can You Feel Me"
  - "Invisible Tattoo"
  - "Crazy Love"
- JoJo – Jumping Trains
  - "Jumping Trains"
  - "Play This Twice"
  - "Safe With Me"
- JoJo – Can't Take That Away from Me,
  - "Boy Without A Heart"
  - "My Time Is Money"
- Big Time Rush – Holiday Bundle (Nick/Columbia Records)
  - "Beautiful Christmas"
- Prince Royce – Phase II (Atlantic)
  - "Addicted"
- Lolene – Electrick Hotel (Capitol)
  - "Rich (Fake It Til You Make It)"
- Vanessa Hudgens – Identified (Hollywood)
  - "Party on the Moon": Writers
- The Cab – Symphony Soldier (Z Entertainment)
  - "Temporary Bliss"
- No Angels – Welcome to the Dance (Universal)
  - "One Life"
  - "Young Love"
  - "Too Old"
  - "Say Goodbye"
- Alex Lambert – (19 Entertainment)
  - "I Didn't Know"
- Marina Chello – (BadBoy)
  - "Sideline"
- Eva Avila – Somewhere Else (Sony/BMG)
  - "Fallin For You"
- Eva Avila – Give Me the Music (Sony/BMG)
  - "Say Goodbye": Writer
- Ivana Santilli – TO.NY (Do Right)
- Tony C – Man on a Mission
- Justice Crew – "Que Sera"
