= Never Say Never (Justin Bieber song) =

Single by Justin Bieber featuring Jaden Smith

from the album Never Say Never: The Remixes
- Released: June 8, 2010
- Recorded: May 6, 2010
- Genre: Teen pop
- Length: 3:47
- Label: Island; RBMG
- Songwriters: Justin Bieber; Jaden Smith; Adam Messinger; Nasri Atweh; Kuk Harrell; Omarr Rambert
- Producer: The Messengers

Justin Bieber singles chronology
"Eenie Meenie" (2010)	"Never Say Never" (2010)	"Somebody to Love" (2010)

Music video
- "Never Say Never" on YouTube

"Never Say Never" is a song by Canadian singer Justin Bieber. The song is used as the theme song for the 2010 film The Karate Kid, and features a rap verse from its star, Jaden Smith. Originally a risque demo with sexual lyrics performed by Travis Garland, it was written and produced by The Messengers, and Omarr Rambert. However, Bieber was tapped to record the song for the film. He re-wrote the song with the original artists along with Smith and his vocal producer Kuk Harrell, to feature inspirational lyrics to foil the film's theme.

The song was released for digital download in the United States on June 8, 2010. The song was later included as an acoustic track on the remix album My Worlds Acoustic (2010) and both the acoustic and single versions were on the compilation album My Worlds: The Collection (2010). To promote Bieber's 3D concert film of the same name, the song was released as the lead and only single from Bieber's second remix album, Never Say Never: The Remixes.

"Never Say Never" peaked within the top twenty in Canada, Norway, and New Zealand, while reaching the top forty in Australia, as well as charting in other international markets. After it was re-released as the lead single and the only single from – The Remixes, promoting his film, the single peaked at number eight on the Billboard Hot 100, becoming Bieber's second top-ten single in the United States. Its accompanying music video, directed by Honey, features Smith and Bieber in a recording studio playing around and dancing, and is intercut with scenes from the film. He has notably performed the song on Today and on his My World Tour. Smith joined Bieber during the tour's stop at Madison Square Garden to perform the song for scenes in Justin Bieber: Never Say Never.

== Background ==
A demo of the song, "Sexy Together" was originally recorded by Travis Garland. Reportedly the song was re-written by its original writers Adam Messinger, Nasri, Omarr Rambert, and his vocal producer Kuk Harrell, while Smith added lines. Carina Adly MacKenzie of Zap2it preferred Bieber and Smith's version, commenting, "No wonder Bieb skipped this version -- it's a total snoozer. You'd think that a song about dying would be more interesting than a song about little kids doing karate... but no." Bieber hinted at the collaboration by posting a promo photo of himself and Smith on his Twitter, and also posting that a video of his would premiere before "Somebody to Love", the second single from his studio album debut, My World 2.0. The song was confirmed when the track listing for the soundtrack was revealed. It was released on iTunes in the United States on June 8, 2010.

== Composition ==
"Never Say Never"
A sample of "Never Say Never" containing inspirational lyrics, such as the line "just no turning back, when your heart's under attack."

"Never Say Never" is a teen pop track which includes hip hop elements. According to the sheet music published at Musicnotes.com by Sony/ATV Music Publishing, "Never Say Never" is set in common time with a metronome of 96 beats per minute, which is described as "steady, not too fast." It is composed in the key of A minor with vocals spanning from the low-note of G_{3} to the high-note of C_{6}. The song follows in the chord progression of Am–C–G–D Bieber provides lead vocals in the song while Smith provides the backing with rap interludes. The song is a "motivational track," containing inspirational lyrics, such as Bieber singing about a life filled with adversity, through lines like, "I never thought that I could walk through fire / I never thought that I could take the burn/ never had the strength to take it higher". Idolator thought the song as a tween-friendly version of Eminem's "Lose Yourself". Smith's lines reference his father, and puns in the phrase, "raised by the power of Will". He also makes reference to his lineage by saying "Born from two stars so the moon's where I land.", as he is the son of Will Smith and Jada Pinkett Smith, who are both Hollywood stars. Smith also makes references to Luke Skywalker and Kobe Bryant in his lines.

== Critical reception ==
Amar Toor of AOL Radio Blog gave the song a positive review, calling it "a burst of energy", and stating, "Even on a soundtrack featuring the likes of Lady Gaga, John Mayer and the Red Hot Chili Peppers, this single...is sure to stand out as the film's flagship anthem." Toor also complimented Bieber's "now-trademark silky-smooth voice." Monica Herrera of Billboard said that Smith's rapping skills could rival those of his former-rapper father. E! Online said "And while some might insist that "Parents Just Don't Understand", we think Big Willy would totally be down with Jaden's rap." Maria-Mercedes Lara of Celebuzz said, "don't make assumptions with the suspiciously nepotistic circumstances surrounding Jaden's appearance on Bieber's song: the kid is actually really good." Lara also commented that Bieber "should be watching his back for Jaden's rising star." Tiger Beat said that they loved the song, and said it had a "great beat."

== Chart performance ==
On the week ending June 17, 2010, the song debuted at number thirty-three on the Billboard Hot 100, propelled by its debut at number seventeen on the Hot Digital Songs chart selling 76,000 copies. The song became Bieber's ninth consecutive top 40 release for a regular or digital single as a lead artist. In Canada on the Canadian Hot 100, the song debuted at eleven. The single debuted at forty-five on the Australian Singles Chart, and peaked at thirty-eight in its second week, while on the New Zealand Singles Chart, the song debuted and peaked at twenty. The Recording Industry Association of New Zealand (RIANZ) certified "Never Say Never" gold on June 5, 2011, denoting the sale of 7,500 copies. On the Norwegian Singles Chart, the song debuted at eighteen, and spent one week on the chart. Debuting at seventy-five on the Austrian Singles Chart, the following week it peaked at forty-six on the chart. On the Dutch Single Top 100, after spending four weeks on the chart, the song peaked at seventy. On the Tip charts in both Belgian regions, the song peaked at two and five.

== Promotion ==
The accompanying clip for the single was directed by Honey. The music video takes place in a studio, and contains a heroic concept, featuring Bieber and Smith singing the song and playing around, intercut with scenes from the film. Bieber appears in a motorcycle jacket and high tops. Studio scenes include Bieber flexing karate moves, he and Smith dancing, jerkin', and eating Twizzlers. The scenes also show the two shadowboxing, as footage from the film shows Smith performing an "array of fight moves." Near the end of the clip features Bieber giving a roundhouse kick.

The music video was posted at 22:11 UTC on May 27, 2010, and released to the public four days later.

The actual 'film' within the music video is directly taken from the footage of Karate Kid, which was shot entirely in Beijing and features Jackie Chan as "Mr. Han", a mentor figure who trains Smith throughout the film. The scenes include Smith looking at the CCTV Headquarters building, a shot of the Beijing street scene, an Air China Boeing 747-400 taking off and landing, and a training scene at the Great Wall of China. The basic storyline involves Smith's character vying for the affection of a Chinese girl and being rebuffed by a rival suitor. Smith eventually wins a fight against his rival and wins the affection of the girl. Both Wall Street Journal Online and E! Online noted the low-production value of the clip. Kyle Anderson of MTV News commended Bieber's latest "attention-grabbing video," and jokingly stated, "As a video that features fighting, it's a pretty strong entry, and it joins the list of great fight-centric videos below." An Idolator writer said that they were impressed with Smith's moves, and Bieber's "spinning roundhouse." A writer for Tiger Beat said, "The video is SO cute–we love when Justin and Jaden get silly at the end!"

Bieber performed the song on June 4, 2011, on the Today Show as part of a medley with "Baby", "Somebody to Love", and "One Time". The song is a part of his setlist during the My World Tour. Smith joined Bieber for the song on the August 31, 2010 date, along with Usher, Miley Cyrus, Ludacris, and Boyz II Men, to film scenes for his upcoming 3D concert film.

To promote his remix album, My Worlds Acoustic as well as draw interest for the upcoming film, Bieber shot a music video for the song. The video premiered during Game 3 of the 2010 World Series. In the video, Bieber stands on a baseball diamond and dons apparel from both teams in the Series, wearing a San Francisco Giants hat and Texas Rangers jacket Scenes in which Bieber sings on the diamond is intercut with players hitting the ball and hanging in the dugout, as well as Bieber playing a guitar. In an interview, Bieber said that the video was inspired by his love for sports.

== Charts ==
=== Weekly charts ===
Chart (2010–2011)	Peak position
Australia (ARIA)	17
Austria (Ö3 Austria Top 40)	31
Belgium (Ultratop 50 Flanders)	26
Belgium (Ultratop 50 Wallonia)	31
Brazil (Brasil Hot 100 Airplay)	98
Canada Hot 100 (Billboard)	11
Czech Republic Airplay (ČNS IFPI)	57
France (SNEP)	93
Ireland (IRMA)	40
Mexico Ingles Airplay (Billboard)	33
Netherlands (Single Top 100)	70
New Zealand (Recorded Music NZ)	20
Norway (VG-lista)	18
UK Singles (OCC)	34
US Billboard Hot 100	8
US Latin Pop Airplay (Billboard)	31
US Pop Airplay (Billboard)	32

Chart (2026)	Peak position
Germany (GfK)	93
Global 200 (Billboard)	68
Greece International (IFPI)	25
Malaysia (Billboard)	22
Malaysia International (RIM)	15
Norway (IFPI Norge)	57
Panama Streaming (PRODUCE)	130
Philippines Hot 100 (Billboard Philippines)	36
Portugal (AFP)	70
Sweden (Sverigetopplistan)	73

=== Year-end charts ===
Chart (2010)	Position
Brazil (Crowley)	61

Chart (2011)	Position
Brazil (Crowley)	55

== Certifications ==
Region	Certification	Certified units/sales
Australia (ARIA)	3× Platinum	210,000^{‡}
Brazil (Pro-Música Brasil)	2× Diamond	500,000^{‡}
Canada (Music Canada)	Platinum	80,000^{*}
Denmark (IFPI Danmark)	Platinum	90,000^{‡}
New Zealand (RMNZ)	Platinum	30,000^{‡}
Norway (IFPI Norway)	Platinum	10,000^{*}
United Kingdom (BPI)	Gold	400,000^{‡}
United States (RIAA)	5× Platinum	5,000,000^{‡}
^{*} Sales figures based on certification alone.^{‡} Sales+streaming figures based on certification alone.

== Radio and release history ==
=== Radio adds ===
Radio add dates and formats
Country	Date	Format
United States	January 25, 2011	Mainstream
United States	January 25, 2011	Rhythmic

=== Digital download ===
Release dates, record label and format details
Country	Date	Format	Label
United States	June 8, 2010	Digital download	Island Records; RBMG
United States	January 25, 2011	Digital download	Island Records; RBMG
