= Midi Mafia =

Music production duo

- Occupations: Record producers; songwriters
- Years active: 1991–present
- Members: Waynne Nugent; Kevin Risto

The MIDI Mafia is a music production duo consisting of American Bruce Waynne (born Waynne Jason Nugent) from Brooklyn, New York and Canadian Dirty Swift (born Kevin John Risto) from Ottawa, Ontario. Together as Midi Mafia since 2003, they are most notable for their production of 50 Cent's number-one single "21 Questions". The MIDI Mafia has also produced for artists such as Frank Ocean ("Swim Good"), Fantasia ("When I See U"), Sha Stimuli (the single "Clap At Ya"), Capone-N-Noreaga ("Yes Sir"), Justin Bieber, Bravehearts, Gemma Fox, Jean Grae, Talib Kweli, Young Buck, Nelly, Miri Ben-Ari, Lloyd Banks and Tamia.

== History ==
=== Beginnings ===
Bruce Waynne met Dirty Swift at Makin' Records Studio in Brooklyn, NY, while working on a project for Bad Seed. At the time, Swift was the in house engineer/beat maker for the project, while Bruce pitched beats and helped compose and perform choruses for Bad Seed.

The duo officially began working together after attending a meeting with manager Tony Perez, who suggested that Bruce and Swift would make a good musical team. They began to hold meetings with different A&R representatives and did spec work for various people, including Sylvia Rhone, who was the president of Elektra Records at the time.

=== Initial success ===
In 2002, Dino Devalie, who was preparing to sign 50 Cent to his label, approached The MIDI Mafia about using some of their beats for 50 Cent's debut record, Get Rich or Die Tryin'. MIDI Mafia agreed, and though 50 Cent ended up signing to Interscope Records instead, their beats were used for the song "21 Questions", which was featured on Get Rich or Die Tryin'.

After the success of "21 Questions", The MIDI Mafia signed a publishing deal with Sony/ATV and a label and production deal with Elektra Records. They were also offered A&R positions at Elektra and were being prepared to run Black Music.

In 2006, The MIDI Mafia launched FamilyTies, an imprint label that allows them to sign and develop their own roster of talent. Singer/songwriter Deemi was the first artist signed to their label.

The MIDI Mafia produced Pop/R&B song "When I See U", (originally written for Tori Kelly when she was signed to Geffen Records) the second single from Fantasia Barrino's self-titled album Fantasia which held the number one spot for eight weeks on the U.S. Billboard's Hot R&B/Hip-Hop Songs charts. The song was written by Grammy award-winning songwriter Jane’t Sewell, Bruce Waynne, and Erika Nuri.

In 2007, the duo worked with Jennifer Lopez on her track "Hold It Don't Drop It", contributing as both writers and producers.

=== Relocation to Los Angeles ===
In 2008, The MIDI Mafia moved from New York to Los Angeles. After their relocation, MIDI Mafia collaborated with American Idol contestant David Archuleta, contributing a track on his self-titled debut album, released in November 2008.

In the process of working with Brandy and James Fauntleroy II, MIDI Mafia met and began to work with Frank Ocean, whom at the time went by the name Lonny Breaux. Then, Breaux was working as a lyricist, and approached The MIDI Mafia with a desire to become better at composing melodies.

While with The MIDI Mafia, Frank Ocean wrote the songs "Quickly" for John Legend, "Bigger" and "Mamma’s Boy" for Justin Bieber. In 2010, The MIDI Mafia recorded Frank Ocean's mix tape, Nostalgia Ultra, in which The MIDI Mafia produced the song Swim Good. The mixtape was recorded by The MIDI Mafia engineer, Reggie Rojo Jr.

The MIDI Mafia also collaborated with Frank Ocean as writers on the track "Bad Religion", off Ocean's debut album, Channel Orange.

=== Branding ===
In November 2009, "PHamous", a hip house song they wrote and produced, was used as a backing track for a flash mob at the Planet Hollywood Resort and Casino in Las Vegas. The flash mob was conceived by YouTuber ShayCarl, who was assisted by fellow YouTubers LisaNova, MysteryGuitarMan, KassemG, Denise Vlogs, Traphik, and HiimRawn. The flashmob video reached two million views within 5 days of its release.

Within the first 20 minutes of the song being posted for download on the Internet, 450,000 people downloaded the song, causing The MIDI Mafia's website to crash.

"PHamous" was used in promos for VH1 television programs and it was also used as the ending song for the weekly video of What da Faq Show which airs on YouTube and Facebook.

On July 16, 2010, the video for "PHamous" debuted on YouTube on TheStation channel, a collaboration channel of most of the YouTubers of the original flash mob, including the lyric about being "friends with ShayCarl." The song was also featured on the We Killed the Radio Star Podcast as the introductory and concluding piece of music during the episode "Don't Drink the Water".

=== Vegas Lights ===
On June 1, 2010, The MIDI Mafia released their own album, Vegas Lights, via FamilyTies. The songs "PHamous", "Last Call" "Mr. Vegas", and "2 Piece" were included on the album. "PHamous", "Last Call", and "2 Piece" were also featured on Season 3 of the MTV show, Jersey Shore. "Mr. Vegas" was used for former Dance Moms star Kalani Hilliker's hip hop trio on Abby's Ultimate Dance Competition. "Mr. Vegas" features an Acme siren.

The song "Lucky Tonight" was featured on Jersey Shore vs American Reunion, an MTV video used to cross-promote the new season of Jersey Shore and the release of the movie, American Reunion.

=== Get Connected ===
In the beginning of 2012, The MIDI Mafia released Get Connected, an EDM album. MIDI Mafia used the project to re-launch their brand.

A remix of their song "Blinded By The Lights" off of Get Connected was used in a promotional trailer for Pauly D’s show, The Pauly D Project.

On July 27, 2012, Conor Maynard released his debut album Contrast featuring the Midi Mafia produced "Pictures".

The MIDI Mafia also remixed Josh Osho's "Giants" featuring Childish Gambino which was included on Osho's album L.I.F.E.

== Production discography ==
| Year | Artist | Album | Song |
|---|---|---|---|
| 1991 | Ground Control | Non-album single | Another Dope Jam |
| 1993 | Jimmy George | A Month Of Sundays | My Final Days With You |
| 1995 | k-os | Non-album single | Musical Essence |
| 1996 | Breez Evahflowin' | Non-album single | Forsaken |
| 1997 | Breez Evahflowin' | Non-album single | I Heard It |
| 1999 | Precious Paris | Non-album single | Four P's In A Pod |
| 1999 | US | Non-album single | Niggaz |
| 1999 | US | Non-album single | Streetz Worldwide |
| 1999 | US | Non-album single | Where U At |
| 1999 | US | Non-album single | Make 'Em Bleed |
| 2000 | The Bad Seed | Uhhnnh | War & Peace |
| 2000 | US | Non-album single | East New York |
| 2000 | US | Non-album single | Price Is Right |
| 2000 | US | Non-album single | Were #1 |
| 2000 | US | Non-album single | Seen What I Seen |
| 2001 | DJ Spinbad | Underground Airplay Version 1.0 | Smokey |
| 2002 | Angie Martinez | Animal House | Never |
| 2002 | Choclair | Memoirs of Blake Savage | Love ’Em All (feat. Baby Blue Soundcrew & Mr. Mims) |
| 2002 | Baby | Birdman | What Happened To That Boy (Dirty Swift Remix) (feat. Clipse) |
| 2002 | Liberator The Righteous Warrior | Strange Girl | Movin' Up In Life |
| 2003 | 50 Cent | Cradle 2 the Grave (soundtrack) | Follow Me Gangster (feat. G-Unit) |
| 2003 | G-Unit | Beg for Mercy | Groupie Love (featuring Butch Cassidy) |
| 2003 | Westside Connection | Terrorist Threats | You Gotta Have Heart |
| 2003 | Westside Connection | Terrorist Threats | Izm |
| 2003 | 50 Cent | Get Rich or Die Tryin' | 21 Questions (feat. Nate Dogg) |
| 2003 | Capone-N-Noreaga | What Up 2 da Hood | Yes Sir (feat. Musaliny-N-Maze) |
| 2003 | Tamia | More | Officially Missing You (MIDI Mafia Remix) |
| 2003 | The God Mommie | Non-album single | I'm So Ghetto |
| 2003 | The God Mommie | Non-album single | Watch Ya Head |
| 2003 | Bravehearts | Bravehearted | B-Train |
| 2003 | Bravehearts | Bravehearted | Buss My Gun (featuring Nashawn) |
| 2003 | Bravehearts | Bravehearted | Realize (featuring Nashawn and Teedra Moses) |
| 2003 | Lil' Mo | Meet the Girl Next Door | 21 Answers (featuring Free) |
| 2003 | Lil' Mo | Meet the Girl Next Door | 4Ever (Midi Mafia Remix) (featuring Baby Cham) |
| 2004 | Young Buck | Straight Outta Ca$hville | Thou Shall |
| 2004 | Nelly | Sweat | Getcha Getcha (featuring St. Lunatics) |
| 2004 | Talib Kweli | The Beautiful Struggle | Black Girl Pain (feat. Jean Grae) |
| 2004 | Talib Kweli | The Beautiful Struggle | We Got the Beat (feat. Res) |
| 2004 | Talib Kweli | The Beautiful Struggle | I Try (feat. Mary J. Blige) |
| 2004 | Jean Grae | This Week | You Don't Want It |
| 2004 | Chamillionaire | The Mixtape Messiah | Call Some Hoes (featuring Kanye West & Stat Quo) |
| 2004 | Tres Coronas | New York Mixtape | Solo Me Deja Mi Tristeza |
| 2004 | The UN | UN Or U Out | Russian Hat Wear |
| 2004 | The UN | Non-album single | D.O.A. |
| 2004 | The UN | Non-album single | Money |
| 2004 | The UN | Non-album single | What They Want |
| 2004 | The UN | Non-album single | Game Of Death |
| 2004 | Mr. Vegas | Non-album single | Pull Up |
| 2004 | Sha Stimuli | Non-album single | Clap At Ya |
| 2004 | Midi Mafia | Non-album single | Let's Get It On (Feat. Notorious B.I.G. & 2Pac) (Midi Mafia Remix) |
| 2004 | Boramy | Non-album single | Le Souffle De La Roquette |
| 2005 | Lloyd Banks | The Big Withdraw | Gettin Money |
| 2005 | Talib Kweli | The Beautiful Mixtape Vol. 2: The Struggle Continues | Tryin To Breathe (feat. Killer Mike) |
| 2005 | Talib Kweli | Right About Now: The Official Sucka Free Mix CD | Rock On |
| 2005 | Mack 10 | Hustla's Handbook | So Gangsta (featuring Butch Cassidy) |
| 2005 | Mack 10 | Hustla's Handbook | Keep It Hood (feat. Bre Perry) |
| 2005 | Miri Ben-Ari | The Hip-Hop Violinist | 4 Flat Tires (feat. Birdman, Lil Wayne & Six-Shot) |
| 2005 | Sha'Liek Rivers | Non-album single | Get 2 Know Ya (feat. Juvenile) |
| 2005 | Midi Mafia | Non-album single | Wait (Remix) (feat. N.O.R.E.) |
| 2005 | Kast One | Non-album single | I'm A Hustla (feat. Mary J. Blige) |
| 2006 | Lady Wray | InDepenDance Day Vol. 1: The Takeover | I'll Take Your Man |
| 2006 | Lloyd Banks | Rotten Apple | Make A Move |
| 2006 | T-Reps | MLB 06: The Show Soundtrack | Heat It Up |
| 2007 | Little Brother | And Justus For All | Grown Man (feat. Talib Kweli) |
| 2007 | Mia Aguilera | Late Nights & Early Mornings | When I See U |
| 2007 | Talib Kweli | Eardrum | Getting My Grown Man On (featuring Little Brother) |
| 2007 | Deemi | Soundtrack of My Life | Soundtrack of My Life |
| 2007 | Fantasia | Fantasia | When I See U |
| 2007 | Elliott Yamin | Elliott Yamin | Free |
| 2007 | Elliott Yamin | Elliott Yamin | Wait for You (feat. Bruce Waynne) (Midi Mafia Radio Edit) |
| 2007 | Midi Mafia | Non-album single | Oh Drama (feat. Kanye West & Stat Quo) |
| 2007 | Midi Mafia | Non-album single | Big Chips (feat. Deemi & Cassidy) |
| 2007 | Midi Mafia | Non-album single | Get Off The Block (feat. N.O.R.E.) |
| 2007 | Shiré | Non-album single | Miss My Love |
| 2007 | Sidi-O | Extrait D'amertume | Petit Speech |
| 2007 | Sidi-O | Extrait D'amertume | Le Prix A Payer (feat. Seth Gueko) |
| 2007 | Deemi | Non-album single | Why N@ggas Always Wanna F#ck? |
| 2007 | Deemi | Non-album single | The Hoodz Princess (feat. Styles P) |
| 2008 | Bryn Christopher | My World | Help Me (feat. Bruce Waynne) |
| 2008 | Bryn Christopher | My World | The Way You Are |
| 2008 | Jennifer Lopez | Brave | Hold It Don't Drop It |
| 2008 | John Legend | Evolver | Quickly (featuring Brandy) |
| 2008 | Brandy | Human | Casualties |
| 2008 | Brandy | Human | Torn Down |
| 2008 | David Archuleta | David Archuleta | Running |
| 2008 | Christina Milian | Dream In Color | One Kiss |
| 2009 | Toni Braxton | Non-album single | If I Was Sane |
| 2009 | Elliott Yamin | Fight for Love | Torn Down |
| 2009 | Elliott Yamin | Fight for Love | Apart From Me |
| 2009 | Elliott Yamin | Fight for Love | Forever In You |
| 2009 | Elliott Yamin | Fight for Love | Know Better |
| 2009 | Sean Kingston | Tomorrow | Why U Wanna Go |
| 2009 | Justin Bieber | My World | Bigger |
| 2009 | Justin Bieber | My World | Down to Earth |
| 2010 | Frank Ocean | Non-album single | Wayfarers (Light Show) |
| 2010 | Frank Ocean | Non-album single | Good Decoration |
| 2010 | Fantasia | Back To Me | Overload |
| 2010 | Justin Bieber | My World 2.0 | Overboard (with Jessica Jarrell) |
| 2010 | Justin Bieber | My World 2.0 | Mama's Boy |
| 2010 | Midi Mafia | Jersey Shore Soundtrack | Last Call |
| 2010 | Chanel West Coast | Chanel a.k.a CC | Tease |
| 2010 | Chanel West Coast | Chanel a.k.a CC | I'm Done |
| 2010 | Kat DeLuna | Inside Out: The Mixtape | Club On Smash |
| 2010 | Kat DeLuna | Non-album single | Fire |
| 2010 | Ciara | Basic Instinct | Why You |
| 2010 | Ciara | Basic Instinct | If Only |
| 2011 | Glasses Malone | Beach Cruiser | Go Big |
| 2011 | Justin Bieber | Never Say Never: The Remixes | Overboard (Live) (featuring Miley Cyrus) |
| 2011 | Frank Ocean | The Lonny Breaux Collection | Standing Still |
| 2011 | Frank Ocean | The Lonny Breaux Collection | Old Terror |
| 2011 | Frank Ocean | The Lonny Breaux Collection | Done |
| 2011 | Frank Ocean | The Lonny Breaux Collection | Read the Stars |
| 2011 | Frank Ocean | The Lonny Breaux Collection | Greedy Love |
| 2011 | Frank Ocean | The Lonny Breaux Collection | Richest Man in the Room |
| 2011 | Frank Ocean | The Lonny Breaux Collection | Standing Still |
| 2011 | Frank Ocean | The Lonny Breaux Collection | Lights |
| 2011 | Frank Ocean | The Lonny Breaux Collection | Taste |
| 2011 | Frank Ocean | The Lonny Breaux Collection | Bedtime Story |
| 2011 | Frank Ocean | The Lonny Breaux Collection | No Bonnie |
| 2011 | Frank Ocean | The Lonny Breaux Collection | Rocket Love |
| 2011 | Frank Ocean | The Lonny Breaux Collection | If I'm in Love |
| 2011 | Frank Ocean | The Lonny Breaux Collection | Simply |
| 2011 | Frank Ocean | The Lonny Breaux Collection | Quickly |
| 2011 | Frank Ocean | The Lonny Breaux Collection | Overload |
| 2011 | Frank Ocean | The Lonny Breaux Collection | Got the Keys |
| 2011 | Frank Ocean | The Lonny Breaux Collection | Scared of Beautiful |
| 2011 | Frank Ocean | The Lonny Breaux Collection | Miss You So |
| 2011 | Frank Ocean | The Lonny Breaux Collection | Ohh in Love |
| 2011 | Frank Ocean | The Lonny Breaux Collection | Time Machine |
| 2011 | Frank Ocean | The Lonny Breaux Collection | One Look |
| 2011 | Frank Ocean | The Lonny Breaux Collection | Blasted |
| 2011 | Frank Ocean | The Lonny Breaux Collection | Hardest Thing |
| 2011 | Frank Ocean | The Lonny Breaux Collection | When I'm Done |
| 2011 | Frank Ocean | nostalgia, ULTRA. | Swim Good |
| 2011 | Frank Ocean | Non-album single | Try |
| 2011 | Nick Carter | I'm Taking Off | Special |
| 2011 | Electric Barbarellas | Strange World | Strange World |
| 2012 | Midi Mafia | What to Expect When You're Expecting Soundtrack | Put Your Hands Up |
| 2012 | Conor Maynard | Contrast | Pictures |
| 2012 | Brams L’Insatiable | Sky is the limit | Dans la mesure du plausible |
| 2012 | JLS | Evolution | Troublemaker (featuring Bebe O'Hare) |
| 2012 | Brandy | Two Eleven | Scared of Beautiful |
| 2012 | Frank Ocean | channel ORANGE | Bad Religion |
| 2012 | Cee Lo Green | Sparkle: Original Motion Picture Soundtrack | I'm a Man |
| 2012 | Sazamyzy & Hype | Grand Banditisme Paris Vol. 2 | El Diablo |
| 2012 | Sazamyzy & Hype | Grand Banditisme Paris Vol. 2 | Paris, Paris (feat. Demon One) |
| 2013 | Angel | About Time | Rocket Love |
| 2013 | Eric Bellinger | Born II Sing Vol. 3 | R&B Singer |
| 2013 | Eric Bellinger | Born II Sing Vol. 3 | Club Lights (feat. Tank) |
| 2013 | Eric Bellinger | Born II Sing Vol. 3 | Body Language (feat. Sha Sha Jones) |
| 2013 | Chanté Moore | Moore Is More | On and On (feat. Da Brat) |
| 2013 | Midi Mafia | Non-album single | Moola (feat. K.I.D & Eric Bellinger) |
| 2013 | Midi Mafia | Non-album single | Do 4 Love (feat. Eric Bellinger) |
| 2013 | Jazmin Sisters | 90's Baby | You |
| 2013 | Jazmin Sisters | 90's Baby | PYT |
| 2013 | Rockie Fresh | Get Connected Brand X | Back Down |
| 2013 | Honey Cocaine | Non-album single | He's The One (feat. Roxie LS) |
| 2014 | Midi Mafia | Non-album single | Reach For The Stars (feat. Frank Ocean & Rockie Fresh) |
| 2014 | Mucho DeNiro | Non-album single | Finally Single (feat. Rayven Justice) |
| 2014 | Kehlani | Cloud 19 | As I Am |
| 2014 | Eric Bellinger | The Rebirth | R&B Singer (Remix) (feat. Joe Budden) |
| 2014 | Eric Bellinger | The Rebirth | Do 4 Love |
| 2014 | President Davo | Non-album single | When I see you |
| 2014 | Jazmin Sisters | Non-album single | Power |
| 2014 | Jazmin Sisters | Non-album single | You (Remix) (feat. Iamsu!) |
| 2014 | Jazmin Sisters | Keep on Livin’ | Keep On Living |
| 2014 | Jazmin Sisters | Keep on Livin’ | Do it Right |
| 2014 | Jazmin Sisters | Keep on Livin’ | Stay Right Here |
| 2014 | Jazmin Sisters | Keep on Livin’ | Second Chances |
| 2014 | Jazmin Sisters | Keep on Livin’ | Paper Cut |
| 2015 | Indiana | No Romeo | Swim Good |
| 2015 | Antonique Smith | Love Is Everything | Higher (Let Your Guard Down) |
| 2016 | H Magnum | Gotham City | Saint Blaise |
| 2016 | Jade Mckenzie | Non-album single | Love Letters |
| 2016 | Original God | The Great American Tragedy | Armada (feat. Swerzie, Yung Bitch & XELA) |
| 2016 | Beez | Hey Tomorrow | Donuts In A Lambo |
| 2016 | Beez | Hey Tomorrow | Round Here |
| 2016 | Beez | Hey Tomorrow | What You Want |
| 2016 | Bibi Bourelly | Free the Real (Pt. 2) | Ballin |
| 2017 | Eric Bellinger | Eric B for President: Term 2 | Naked in the White House |
| 2017 | Eric Bellinger | Eric B for President: Term 2 | Make You Mine |
| 2017 | Eric Bellinger | Eric B for President: Term 2 | Know / Vibes |
| 2017 | Eric Bellinger | Eric B for President: Term 2 | Too Cool / Boujee |
| 2017 | Eric Bellinger | Eric B for President: Term 2 | Treat Yourself |
| 2017 | Eric Bellinger | Eric B for President: Term 2 | Coastin' |
| 2017 | Eric Bellinger | Eric B for President: Term 2 | Island |
| 2017 | Eric Bellinger | Eric B for President: Term 2 | Malibu Nights |
| 2017 | Eric Bellinger | Cannabliss | Blazin’ Wit the Bros |
| 2017 | Eric Bellinger | Cannabliss | Flight |
| 2017 | Wayne Tucker | Wake Up and See The Sun | Bad Religion |
| 2018 | Tank | Non-album single | When We (Remix) (feat. Trey Songz & Ty Dolla $ign) |
| 2018 | Tinashe | Joyride | Weekday |
| 2020 | A Boogie wit da Hoodie | Artist 2.0 | Cinderella Story |
| 2020 | Myke Towers | Easy Money Baby | Girl |
| 2020 | Eric Bellinger | Feelin' Like Christmas | Wakin Up |
| 2020 | Eric Bellinger | Feelin' Like Christmas | Gift Exchange |
| 2021 | Foolio | Non-album single | When I See You |
| 2021 | Lil Muk | Non-album single | See Me |
| 2021 | Eric Bellinger | Genius | Share You With No One |
| 2021 | Eric Bellinger | Genius | Genius |
| 2021 | Juice WRLD | Non-album single | Turkey Burgers |
| 2022 | Cat Power | Covers | Bad Religion |
