= U Smile =

Single by Justin Bieber

from the album My World 2.0
- Released: August 9, 2010
- Recorded: November 26, 2009 Platinum Sound Recording Studios (New York City, New York); Triangle Sound Studios (Atlanta, Georgia)
- Genre: Blue-eyed soul
- Length: 3:16
- Label: Island, RBMG
- Songwriters: Justin Bieber, Jerry Duplessis, Arden Altino, Dan August Rigo
- Producers: Jerry Duplessis, Arden Altino

Justin Bieber singles chronology
"Somebody to Love" (2010)	"U Smile" (2010)	"Pray" (2010)

Music video
- "U Smile" on YouTube

"U Smile" is a song performed by Canadian singer Justin Bieber. It was written by Jerry Duplessis, Arden Altino, Dan August Rigo, and Bieber, and produced by Duplessis and Altino. The song was released as the second digital-only single from the latter half of Bieber's first album on March 16, 2010. It was released to mainstream radio in Canada on August 9, 2010, followed by a mainstream and rhythmic release on August 24, 2010, in the United States as the album's third single there.

The song, a piano- and-instrument driven blue-eyed soul ballad, garnered acclaim from critics as a standout track from the album. The song charted at seventeen and twenty-seven respectively in the United States and Canada, and later charted in the United Kingdom. Bieber performed the song as an intro to "Baby" on the ninth season of American Idol and on Saturday Night Live.

== Background ==
On Twitter, Bieber wrote, "'U Smile' is one of the best songs I have ever recorded ... It really is a throwback to the great records I listened to growing up. ... I wrote it for all my fans who got me here." Bieber explained on his Twitter that his fans "took him from a small town in Canada" to the "amazing opportunity" he is living now, and feels "grateful for everything" and "blessed" for the support. Bieber confirmed he co-wrote the track with August Rigo. He also told his fans to enjoy it as they are the ones who give him his strength in this.

== Composition and critical reception ==
"U Smile"
A sample of "U Smile", a piano and instrument driven ballad which has been described to have a "Motown vibe"

"U Smile" is a blue-eyed soul ballad, driven by piano and other instruments. Leah Greenblatt of Entertainment Weekly said the song is "the best by far" of My World 2.0, calling it "a shimmery slice of Hall & Oates-style blue-eyed soul". The song has a "Blues" feel, and makes use of metaphors such as "You are my ends and my means/With you there’s no in between." The song composed in the key E♭ Mixolydian and it set in time signature of compound time with twelve eighth note in a bar, with the tempo of 75 beats per minute. Bieber's vocal range span more than one octave from the lowest note A♭_{3} and the highest note E♭_{5}. It follows the chord progression E♭-D♭-A♭.

Bill Lamb of About.com noted the song as a track on My World 2.0 and said it "lets Justin Bieber sway and croon. It is guaranteed to generate warm and fuzzy emotions in millions of young fans" and that it "should not disappoint adults either". Monica Herrera of Billboard commended the song and said that it "should appeal to some older listeners." For Billboard's cover story on Bieber, Herrera said, "Bieber croons, his voice straining as much from puberty as emotion. It's the closest he's come to fulfilling Braun's wish, by sounding like a certain young Motown star. "This is as unconditional as it'll ever get/You ain't seen nothing yet".

== Chart performance ==
Originally released as a digital-only single, the song debuted at number twenty-seven on the Billboard Hot 100, selling 83,000 downloads in its first week. It also debuted on the Canadian Hot 100 at seventeen. "U Smile" was the highest debut on the week on both charts. The song initially stayed on both charts for a weeks' length. Following an official release to mainstream and rhythmic radio, the song re-entered the US Hot 100 at ninety-five on the week ending October 2, 2010. Due to digital sales, the song also reached ninety-eight in the United Kingdom.

== Music video ==
=== Background and reception ===
Bieber seen in an empty theater playing the piano while blue and yellow spot lighting is seen in the background.

On September 30, 2010, the music video for "U Smile" premiered online, it was directed by Colin Tilley, with a cameo appearance by Sandra Bullock. Bieber had stated that the video for "U Smile" was about "letting fans experience the ultimate fantasy for any hard-core Belieber: being Justin's girlfriend", further explaining in a tweet, "I took the opportunity 2 make a video 4 the fans, about a fan, and how we could fall IN LOVE." Mawuse Ziegbe from MTV met the video with a positive review. Ziegbe felt that the video suggested "a more mature Bieber, who appears to relish the quiet moments with his gal pal away from the nonstop fan hysteria." Ziegbe also felt that the video "displayed [Bieber's] skills as an instrumentalist, as he belts out the lyrics from behind a grand piano throughout much of the vid."

=== Synopsis ===
Starting out in a black and white frame (and later incorporating scenes of color), a group of girls are seen standing outside on the street while Bieber is seen exiting a building while trying to walk away without getting noticed. This however, is unsuccessful as the girls run up to Bieber; he then takes pictures and signs autographs with the girls. While this is happening Bieber takes an interest with one particular girl asking her to meet him later on, to which she agrees. As the song starts playing Bieber is seen sitting in an empty auditorium playing the piano and singing. When Bieber's date shows up they sneak into an empty theater where they are seen; holding hands, horsing around on the theater's seats, and sliding down banisters. At the ending of the video they are seen engaging in a playful back-alley water fight and eventually collapse into each other's arms while Bieber is playing the piano back inside the theater.

== Live performances ==
Bieber performed the song along with "Baby" on the eighteenth episode of season thirty five of Saturday Night Live. He also performed the song in American Idol along with "Baby" on May 19, 2010. It was also released as a single video of the live performance, along with "Baby". Bieber performed the song at the 2010 Teen Choice Awards on August 9, 2010. The performance was pre-recorded because Bieber could not attend the event. The performance was filmed in Los Angeles on his My World Tour. Bieber later performed an a cappella version of the song for the final time during his Washington, DC stop of his Purpose World Tour.

== Slowed version ==
In August 2010, music producer Varien used the sound processing software PaulStretch to create an 800% slower version of the album track, lasting around 35 minutes, which he made available via SoundCloud. The modified track resembled a minimalist, ambient composition. By September 2 it had been discussed in multiple news articles, linked to from Bieber's website, and downloaded more than one million times.

The slowed version of this song served as inspiration for the Slo-Mo theme in the film Dredd (2012). Alex Garland, the film's writer and producer, said that Portishead instrumentalist Geoff Barrow "sent me a link to a Justin Bieber song slowed down 800 times and it became this stunning trippy choral music." Morgan then recreated the effect based on the modified track, which was used in the finished film. The film used Bieber's music as a temporary placeholder during editing before the score was finalised.

== Credits and personnel ==
- Songwriting - Jerry Duplessis, Arden Altino, Dan August Rigo, Bieber
- Production - Jerry Duplessis, Arden Altino
- Vocal recording - Andy Grassi, Serge Tsai, Dave Clauss, Warren Babson, assisted by William Villane
- Vocal production and recording - Kuk Harrell, assisted by Travis Harrington
- Piano and keyboards - Arden Altino, additional by Paul J. Falcone
- Guitar - Bruno J Sutter III, Ben DeFusco
- Harmonica - Frédéric Yonnet
- Mixing - Glen Marchese
- Engineering - Pat Thrall

== Charts ==
Chart (2010)	Peak position
Australia (ARIA)	65
Belgium (Ultratip Bubbling Under Flanders)	21
Canada Hot 100 (Billboard)	17
Canada CHR/Top 40 (Billboard)	24
Canada Hot AC (Billboard)	47
UK Singles (OCC)	98
US Billboard Hot 100	27
US Pop Airplay (Billboard)	26

=== Year-end charts ===
Chart (2011)	Position
Brazil (Crowley)	52

== Certifications ==
Region	Certification	Certified units/sales
Australia (ARIA)	Platinum	70,000^{‡}
Brazil (Pro-Música Brasil)	2× Platinum	120,000^{‡}
New Zealand (RMNZ)	Gold	15,000^{‡}
United States (RIAA)	Platinum	1,000,000^{‡}
^{‡} Sales+streaming figures based on certification alone.

== Release history ==
Region	Date	Format
Canada	August 9, 2010	Mainstream airplay
United States	August 24, 2010	Mainstream and rhythmic airplay
United States	October 12, 2010	Urban airplay
