= My World 2.0 =

Studio album by Justin Bieber
- Released: March 19, 2010
- Genres: Teen pop; bubblegum pop; R&B
- Length: 37:37
- Labels: Island; Teen Island; RBMG; US; Schoolboy
- Producers: Justin Bieber; Tricky Stewart; The-Dream; Jerry Duplessis; Mel & Mus; Dapo Torimiro; Dirty Swift; Bruce Waynne; Benny Blanco; The Messengers; Bryan-Michael Cox; The Stereotypes; The Runners; "Mama Jan" Smith

Justin Bieber chronology
My World (2009)	My World 2.0 (2010)	My Worlds: The Collection (2010)

Singles from My World 2.0
- 1. "Baby" Released: January 18, 2010; 2. "Eenie Meenie" Released: March 13, 2010; 3. "Somebody to Love (Remix)" Released: April 20, 2010; 4. "U Smile" Released: August 9, 2010

My World 2.0 is the debut studio album by Canadian singer Justin Bieber. It was released on March 19, 2010, by Island Records. It is considered the second half of a two-piece project, supplementing Bieber's debut extended play (EP) My World (2009). After signing a recording contract in light of his growing popularity on YouTube, Bieber worked with collaborators including his mentor Usher, and producers Tricky Stewart, The-Dream, and MIDI Mafia. The record follows in the same vein as My World, incorporating teen pop and R&B elements. Lyrically, it discusses teen romance and coming of age situations.

Upon its release, My World 2.0 received generally favorable reviews from music critics, who complimented its production. It debuted at number 1 on the US Billboard 200 albums chart with first-week sales of 283,000 copies. Bieber became the youngest solo male artist to top the album chart since Stevie Wonder in 1963. With My World peaking at number 5 on the chart that week, Bieber became the first artist to occupy two Top 5 positions on the ranking since Nelly in 2004. The album's sales were larger in its second week of release in the US, becoming the first album since the Beatles' 1 (2000) to debut at number 1 there, and have a stronger-selling second week. Bieber also had his second consecutive number 1 album in Canada, and in its second week of release the album peaked at number 1 in Ireland, Australia, and New Zealand. It also charted in the Top 10 of fifteen other countries.

The album was preceded by the lead single, "Baby", featuring American rapper Ludacris, which was released on January 18, 2010, and two promotional digital singles, "Never Let You Go" on March 2, 2010, and "U Smile" on March 16, 2010. "Somebody to Love" aired on the radio as the album's third official single on April 20, 2010, and "U Smile" was eventually released to radio as the album's fourth official single on August 24, 2010. Bieber also supported the album with his first headlining worldwide concert tour, the My World Tour (2010–2011). He was the ninth solo artist to chart on the Billboard 200 under the age of 18, as well as the third solo male artist to do so since Stevie Wonder's Recorded Live: The 12 Year Old Genius for 47 years. The album received a Grammy Award nomination for Best Pop Vocal Album at the 53rd Grammy Awards.

== Background and composition ==
In 2009, in an interview with Billboard at the Z100 Jingle Ball, Bieber explained the reasoning behind splitting his debut release into two parts, My World and My World 2.0. Bieber said that people do not want to wait "over a year and a half" for new music, and it was decided best to give it in parts. In an interview with the Houston Chronicle, Bieber stated, "I wanted to do something that was a little bit more R&B and that could reach out to everyone. I just wanted to be able to show my vocal abilities." In a piece with The New York Times Bieber stated that most of the production took place in Atlanta, and confirmed collaborating again with Tricky Stewart and The-Dream. Bieber said that he was hoping that the album would be much better, considering that My World was his first time in a studio, calling himself "a rookie last album because it was during my first year."

"Up"
A sample of the R&B ballad "Up".

"Runaway Love"
A sample of "Runaway Love", which has a vintage Motown-esque sound.

"I think I am growing up and that the lyrics show that. That song is about my dad and having him not always being there. But my dad and I now have a great relationship. And I'm fine that stuff like that is coming out. I want to sing about things that are going on in my life, and a lot of people will be able to relate to it."

— Bieber on change in lyrical content and the album track "Where Are You Now?"

Sara Anderson of AOL Music commented that "his sophomore release also showcases pop-y and hip-hop fused tracks". The record has also been said to mine "vintage teen-pop themes" but play as "2010-model bubblegum". It has also been called "catchy, upbeat and dreamy", bringing to mind "smash dance hits". The lyrical content consists of "necessary us-against-the-world teen-love dramatics." Jody Rosen of Rolling Stone commented that, "As long as there has been rock & roll, there have been pretty-boy singers like Bieber, offering a gentle introduction to the mysteries and heartaches of adolescence: songs flushed with romance but notably free of sex itself."

The album's lead single, "Baby", coined by Rolling Stone as a "consciously crafted throwback" draws from fifties music and doo-wop while incorporating a hip-hop influence. The lyrical contents refer to the departure of a first love in lines such as, "And I wanna play it cool/But I'm losin' you.../I'm in pieces/Baby fix me...." Monica Herrera of Billboard said that "Somebody to Love" and "Eenie Meenie" were "hardwired for Top 40". "Somebody to Love" contains influences of European music, notably dance and disco, and is a "straightforward plea for a soul mate". "Eenie Meenie" has been described as "sultry reggaton", and references childhood rhymes. Two of the album's tracks, "Runaway Love" and "U Smile" echo Motown, and critics claimed the tracks go beyond Bieber's demographic. The former has been compared to the work of Michael Jackson and the Jackson 5, influenced by funk and disco. The song has been described as "lush" and "sauntering", giving off a summer vibe. Jon Caramanica of The New York Times said "Runaway Love" was a "winning amalgam" of New Edition and Depeche Mode's "Policy of Truth." However, the song's "breezy groove" has been said to reminisce Janet Jackson's "Runaway" and Justin Timberlake's "Rock Your Body." The latter, "U Smile", compared to Hall & Oates, has a "bluesy" feel, and makes use of metaphors such as, "You are my ends and my means/With you there's no in between."

Andy Kellman of Allmusic commented that the album's ballads could be considered adult contemporary "if the singer happened to be of age". The album's ballads, such as "Never Let You Go" and "Stuck in the Moment" mix "love-struck lyrics with big, lovable, choruses". The previous has been noted to have distinct similarities to Chris Brown's "Forever", while the latter makes references to doomed couples such as Romeo & Juliet, Bonnie & Clyde and Sonny & Cher. In "That Should Be Me", a "sobbing ballad", Bieber "plays the scorned ex", with lyrics like, "Did you forget all the plans that you made with me?". "Up"'s lyrics have Bieber realize love makes him invulnerable as he sings about how a relationship can only get better, with exaggerated lines such as, "We'll take it to the sky/Past the moon/Through the galaxies." A Wal-Mart bonus track, "Where Are You Now", an extension of sorts of My World's "Down To Earth", focuses on Bieber's feelings after his parents' splitting up.

== Promotion ==
As he did with My World, Bieber went on a radio promotion spree in addition to other appearances. Bieber performed in Berlin for the Dome 53 on March 5, 2010. In the United Kingdom he appeared on British talk show Alan Carr: Chatty Man, on breakfast television show GMTV, and on Live from Studio Five. Bieber performed several songs from My World and My World 2.0 on QVC's "Q Sessions" on March 9, when his album was up for pre-sale on the network. He and Selena Gomez performed at a concert at the Houston Rodeo on March 21. Bieber also appeared on ABC's Nightline and in a CBS News segment interview with Katie Couric. on He also performed on The View on March 23, and returned on the show for the March 24, episode, during which he also performed on BET's 106 & Park and the Late Show with David Letterman. Bieber followed up the album with performances at the 2010 Kids' Choice Awards on March 27, 2010, and as the musical guest on Saturday Night Live in April. Bieber also promoted the album on The Oprah Winfrey Show on May 11, 2010, and performed on that season's American Idol. Bieber continued the album's promotion by performing on Today on June 4, 2010, and on June 19 at the "MuchMusic Awards".

== Singles ==
"Baby" featuring Ludacris, was released as the album's lead single on January 18, 2010, and it went on to impact the mainstream and rhythmic radio formats. The song held Bieber's highest peaks at the time, reaching number 3 and 5, respectively, in Canada and the United States, and charted in the Top 10 of five other countries. "Somebody to Love" was sent to mainstream and rhythmic radio as the album's second single on April 20, 2010. It reached the Top 20 in most countries.

"U Smile", which was originally released as the second digital single, was played on the mainstream radio as the album's third single on August 24, 2010, and in on September 6, 2010. It has already peaked at numbers 17 and 21 in Canada and the United States, respectively. It also peaked at number 98 in the United Kingdom due to strong digital downloads.

"Never Let You Go" was released as the first digital-only single from the album on March 2, 2010. It debuted at numbers 14 and 21 in Canada and the United States, respectively. The song has an accompanying video, which was shot at the Atlantis resort in the Bahamas. It was thought to be the album's second single, but is unknown since "Somebody to Love" was sent to radio as the second single.

== Critical reception ==
Professional ratings
Aggregate scores
Source	Rating
Metacritic	68/100
Review scores
Source	Rating
AllMusic	4/5 stars
BBC Music	(positive)
The Boston Globe	(mixed)
Entertainment Weekly	(B)
National Post	(positive)
The New York Times	(mixed)
Rolling Stone	3/5 stars
Sputnikmusic	(2.5/5)
The Washington Post	(mixed)

My World 2.0 received an average score of 68 of 100 at music review aggregator Metacritic. Andy Kellman of Allmusic has the album at a rating of four out of five stars, praising the album for its "upbeat R&B-flavored pop songs" along with Bieber's ballads that "might be termed adult contemporary if the singer happened to be of age". He also complimented the dance-pop songs, calling them, "light on the ears yet memorable; and that "the unrequited material sounds deeply felt; the ballads have all the necessary us-against-the-world teen-love dramatics." Leah Greenblatt of Entertainment Weekly gave the album a B rating, stating that it "won't likely affect any adults, not in the direct blast radius of Bieber's target range", however, she praised how many tracks reminded her "the sanitized R&B swagger of early-days Usher and Justin Timberlake", along with commending the song "U Smile" as a "shimmery slice of Hall & Oates-style blue-eyed souland", and finally stating "there's a real talent, it seems, under all that hair."

However, Sputnikmusic's Rudy Klapper found that his producers "do him little favors" and commented on its substance, "Nearly every song requires some sort of suspension of belief thanks to the lyrics, but if one ignores just what bull*** Bieber is spewing at any given time, My World 2.0 reveals itself as a largely unobjectionable slice of harmless pop music." Luke O'Neil of The Boston Globe criticized the music's "recycling" of different styles and wrote in conclusion, "will anyone care about this record of au courant R&B, soul, and junior high pop five minutes into the future? Give it some time." Jon Caramanica of The New York Times called the album "an amiable collection of age-appropriate panting with intermittent bursts of misplaced precociousness", but added that "Bieber's fumbles are easily muffled by his production — more technology — which, while less ambitious here than on his debut EP, is still brutally effective." Rolling Stone gave it three out of five stars and called it "a seriously good pop record, one that mines vintage teen-pop themes but plays like a primer on 2010-model bubblegum."

== Commercial performance ==
My World 2.0 debuted at number 1 on the US Billboard 200 chart, selling 283,000 copies in its first week. This became Bieber's first US number 1 debut and his second Top 10 album. In its second week, the album fell to number 2 behind Usher's Raymond v. Raymond, selling an additional 291,000 copies, which was a 3% increase. In its third week, the album returned to number 1 on the chart, selling 102,000 more copies, which was a 65% decrease from its previous week. In its fourth week, the album remained at number 1 on the chart, selling 92,000 copies, bringing its four-week total to 768,000 copies. As of December 2015, the album has sold 3,330,000 copies in the US. On June 24, 2020, the album was certified quadruple platinum by the Recording Industry Association of America (RIAA) for combined sales and album-equivalent units of over four million units in the United States.

== Track listing ==
The track listing was confirmed on Bieber's official website on February 26, 2010.

No.	Title	Writer(s)	Producer(s)	Length
1.	"Baby" (featuring Ludacris)	Justin Bieber; Terius Nash; Christopher Stewart; Christina Milian; Christopher Bridges	Stewart; The-Dream; Kuk Harrell (vocal)	3:34
2.	"Somebody to Love"	Jonathan Yip; Jeremy Reeves; Ray Romulus; Heather Bright; Bieber	Stereotypes; Harrell (vocal)	3:41
3.	"Stuck in the Moment"	Yip; Reeves; Romulus; Dan August Rigo; Bieber; Michael Ray Nguyen-Stevenson	Stereotypes; Harrell (vocal)	3:43
4.	"U Smile"	Jerry Duplessis; Arden Altino; Dan August Rigo; Bieber	Jerry Duplessis; Altino (co-producer); Harrell (vocal)	3:17
5.	"Runaway Love"	Melvin Hough II; Rivelino Wouter; Timothy Thomas; Theron Thomas; Bieber	Mel & Mus; Harrell (vocal)	3:32
6.	"Never Let You Go"	Johntá Austin; Bryan-Michael Cox; Bieber	Cox	4:24
7.	"Overboard" (with Jessica Jarrell)	Waynne Nugent; Kevin Risto; Dapo Torimiro; Taurian Shropshire; Bieber	Dirty Swift; Bruce Waynne; Harrell (vocal)	4:11
8.	"Eenie Meenie" (with Sean Kingston)	Benny Blanco; Kisean Anderson; The Jackie Boyz; Bieber; Da Internz	Blanco; Harrell (vocal); Steve "Ill Rock" Siravo (add. vocal production)	3:23
9.	"Up"	Nasri Tony Atweh; Adam Messinger; Bieber	The Messengers; Harrell (vocal)	3:55
10.	"That Should Be Me"	Atweh; Messinger; Luke Boyd; Bieber	The Messengers; Harrell (vocal)	3:53
Total length:				37:37

iTunes Store bonus track
No.	Title	Writer(s)	Producer(s)	Length
11.	"Kiss and Tell"	The Runners; Rigo; The Monarch; Karlyn Ramsey; Bieber	The Runners; The Monarch (co-producer); Harrell (vocal)	3:47

Wal-Mart and Australian bonus track
No.	Title	Writer(s)	Producer(s)	Length
11.	"Where Are You Now?"	Bieber	Cox; Bieber; "Mama Jan" Smith; Harrell (vocal)	4:27

Japanese Deluxe edition bonus tracks
No.	Title	Writer(s)	Producer(s)	Length
11.	"Kiss and Tell"	The Runners; Rigo; The Monarch; Ramsey; Bieber	The Runners; The Monarch (co-producer); Harrell (vocal)	3:47
12.	"Where Are You Now?"	Bieber	Cox; Bieber; Smith; Harrell (vocal)	4:27

=== My Worlds ===
My Worlds is the reissue of Bieber's first extended play My World. It includes both the My World EP and Bieber's debut album My World 2.0 on its tracklisting. The album was released on March 19, 2010, the same day as My World 2.0.

Standard edition
No.	Title	Writer(s)	Producer(s)	Length
1.	"One Time"	C. "Tricky" Stewart; James Bunton; Corron Cole; Thabiso Nkhereanye	JB & Corron; Stewart; Kuk Harrell (vocals)	3:36
2.	"Favorite Girl"	Dernst "D'Mile" Emile II; Delisha Thomas; Antea Birchett; Anesha Birchett	Emile II	4:17
3.	"Down to Earth"	Justin Bieber; Waynne Nugent; Kevin Risto; Mason Levy; Carlos Battey; Steven Battey	Dirty Swift; Bruce Waynne	4:06
4.	"Bigger"	Bieber; Nugent; Risto; Dapo Torimiro; Lonny Breaux	Dirty Swift; Bruce Waynne; Torimiro	3:18
5.	"One Less Lonely Girl"	Ezekiel "Zeke" Lewis; Balewa Muhammad; Sean P. Hamilton; Hyuk Shin; Usher Raymond IV	Lewis; Muhammad; Hamilton; Shin	3:49
6.	"First Dance" (featuring Usher)	Bieber; Raymond IV; Alexander Parhm Jr.; Ryon Lovett; Jesse Wilson; Dwight Reynolds	Pretty Boi Fresh	3:42
7.	"Love Me"	Bruno Mars; Philip Lawrence; Ari Levine; Peter Svensson; Nina Persson	DJ Frank E; Bill Malina (vocal)	3:14
8.	"Common Denominator"	Lashaunda "Babygirl" Carr; Bieber	Carr	4:11
9.	"Baby" (featuring Ludacris)	Justin Bieber; Terius Nash; Christopher Stewart; Christina Milian; Christopher Bridges	Stewart; The-Dream; Kuk Harrell (vocal)	3:34
10.	"Somebody to Love"	Jonathan Yip; Jeremy Reeves; Ray Romulus; Heather Bright; Bieber	Stereotypes; Harrell (vocal)	3:41
11.	"Stuck in the Moment"	Yip; Reeves; Romulus; Dan August Rigo; Bieber; Michael Ray Nguyen-Stevenson	Stereotypes; Harrell (vocal)	3:43
12.	"U Smile"	Jerry Duplessis; Arden Altino; Dan August Rigo; Bieber	Jerry Duplessis; Altino (co-producer); Harrell (vocal)	3:17
13.	"Runaway Love"	Melvin Hough II; Rivelino Wouter; Timothy Thomas; Theron Thomas; Bieber	Mel & Mus; Harrell (vocal)	3:32
14.	"Never Let You Go"	Johntá Austin; Bryan-Michael Cox; Bieber	Cox	4:24
15.	"Overboard" (duet with Jessica Jarrell)	Waynne Nugent; Kevin Risto; Dapo Torimiro; Taurian Shropshire; Bieber	Dirty Swift; Bruce Waynne; Harrell (vocal)	4:11
16.	"Eenie Meenie" (with Sean Kingston)	Benny Blanco; Kisean Anderson; The Jackie Boyz; Bieber; Da Internz	Blanco; Harrell (vocal); Steve "Ill Rock" Siravo (add. vocal production)	3:23
17.	"Up"	Nasri Tony Atweh; Adam Messinger; Bieber	The Messengers; Harrell (vocal)	3:55
18.	"That Should Be Me"	Atweh; Messinger; Luke Boyd; Bieber	The Messengers; Harrell (vocal)	3:53
Total length:				25:58

Australian iTunes Store bonus track
No.	Title	Writer(s)	Producer(s)	Length
19.	"Kiss and Tell"	The Runners; Rigo; The Monarch; Karlyn Ramsey; Bieber	The Runners; The Monarch (co-producer); Harrell (vocal)	3:47

Japanese bonus tracks
No.	Title	Writer(s)	Producer(s)	Length
19.	"Kiss and Tell"	The Runners; Rigo; The Monarch; Ramsey; Bieber	The Runners; The Monarch (co-producer); Harrell (vocal)	3:47
20.	"Where Are You Now?"	Bieber	Cox; Bieber; Smith; Harrell (vocal)	4:27

Japanese Special edition bonus tracks
No.	Title	Writer(s)	Producer(s)	Length
19.	"Never Say Never" (featuring Jaden Smith)	Bieber; Smith; Messinger; Atweh; Harrell; Rambert	The Messengers; Harrell; Rambert (voc.)	3:49
20.	"Somebody to Love" (featuring Usher)	Bieber; Reeves; Romulus; Yip; Bright	Stereotypes	3:44

Japanese Deluxe edition bonus DVD
No.	Title	Director(s)	Length
1.	"One Time" (Music video)	Vashtie Kola	4:02
2.	"One Less Lonely Girl" (Music video)	Roman White	3:48
3.	"Baby" (featuring Ludacris) (Music video)	Ray Kay	3:44
4.	"One Time" (Behind the scenes)		3:34
5.	"One Less Lonely Girl" (Behind the scenes)		3:38
6.	"Baby" (featuring Ludacris) (Behind the scenes)		3:31

== Personnel ==
- Ryan Aldred – stylist
- Arden "Keyz" Altino – piano, keyboards, producer (Track 4)
- K. Anderson – composer (Track 8)
- Zack Atkinson – art direction, design
- Nasri Atweh – composer, background vocals, producer, instrumentation (Tracks 9–10)
- Johnta Austin – composer (Track 6)
- Warren Babson – recording engineer (Track 4)
- Bruno Beatz – guitar (Track 4)
- Matt Beckley – music editing (Track 8)
- A.J. Benson – A&R
- Justin Bieber – composer, vocals (All Tracks)
- Benny Blanco – composer, drums, keyboards, music programming, producer, engineer (Track 8)
- Luke Boyd – composer, background vocals (Track 10)
- Jackie Boyz (Carlos & Steven Battey) – composer, background vocals (Track 8)
- Scott "Scooter" Braun – executive producer
- C. Bridges – composer (Track 1)
- Leesa D. Brunson – A&R
- Dave Clauss – recording engineer, audio mixing assistant (Track 4)
- Bryan-Michael Cox – music producer, instrumentation (Track 6)
- Tom Coyne – mastering
- Ben Defusco – guitar (Track 4)
- Dirty Swift – music producer, music recording engineer (Track 7)
- Jerry Duplessis – composer, producer (Track 4)
- Paul J. Falcone – additional keyboards (Track 4)
- Şerban Ghenea – audio mixing (Track 8)
- Shani Gonzales – A&R
- Andy Grassi – recording engineer (Track 4)
- Kuk Harrell – vocal recording engineer, vocal producer (All Tracks)
- Travis Harrington – assistant vocal recording engineer (All Tracks)
- Christopher Hicks – producer
- Daria Hines – stylist
- Sam Holland – recording engineer (Track 8)
- Melvin Hough II – composer, instrumentation (Track 5)
- Jimmy James – assistant music editing (Track 8)
- Jaycen Joshua – audio mixing (Tracks 1–2, 5)
- Doug Joswick – package production
- Sean Kingston – additional lead vocals (Track 8)
- Chris Kraus – music recording engineer (Track 7)
- Jeremy "J Boogs" Levin – production coordination (Track 8)
- Giancarlo Lino – audio mixing assistant (Tracks 1–2, 5)
- Pamela Littky – photography
- Phillip Lynah Jr. – music recording engineer (Track 5)
- Erik Madrid – audio mixing assistant (Tracks 3, 6–7, 9–10)
- Glen Marchese – audio mixing (Track 4)
- Manny Marroquin – audio mixing (Tracks 3, 6–7, 9–10)
- Adam Messinger – producer, instrumentation (Tracks 9–10)
- Joshua Monroy – Ludacris' vocal recording engineer (Track 1)
- Monte Neuble – additional keyboards (Track 1)
- Terius "The-Dream" Nash – composer, music producer (Track 1)
- Luis Navarro – assistant recording engineer (Track 1)
- Waynne Nugent – composer (Track 7)
- Chris "Tek" O'Ryan – production engineer (Track 3)
- Greg Ogan – Sean Kingston's vocal producer, Sean Kingston's vocal recording engineer (Track 8)
- Christian Plata – audio mixing assistant (Tracks 3, 6–7, 9–10)
- Kevin Porter – instrumental recording assistant (Track 1)
- Vanessa Price – grooming
- Jeremy Reeves – composer (Tracks 2–3)
- L.A. Reid – executive producer
- K. Risto – composer (Track 7)
- Todd Russell – art direction, design
- Kelly Sheehan – recording engineer (Track 1)
- Taurian Shropshire – composer (Track 7)
- The Stereotypes – music producer, music recording engineer (Tracks 2–3)
- Steve Siravo – Sean Kingston's vocal recording engineer, Sean Kingston's vocal producer (Track 8)
- C. "Tricky" Stewart – composer, music producer (Track 1)
- Brian "B-Luv" Thomas – recording engineer (Track 1)
- Sam Thomas – music recording engineer (Track 6)
- Pat Thrall – additional recording engineer (Tracks 1–2, 4, 7, 9–10)
- Dapo Torimiro – composer, music producer (Track 7)
- Sergio "Sergical" Tsai – recording engineer (Track 4)
- Usher – background vocals (Track 2), executive producer
- Bruce Waynne – music producer (Track 7)
- Janelle White – A&R
- R. Wouter – composer (Track 5)
- Andrew Wuepper – recording engineer (Track 1)
- Kristen Yiengst – art coordinator, photo coordination
- Jonathan Yip – composer (Tracks 2–3)
- Frederic Yonnet – harmonica (Track 4)

== Charts ==
=== Weekly charts ===
Weekly chart performance for My World 2.0
Chart (2010)	Peak position
Australian Albums (ARIA)^{[A]}	1
Austrian Albums (Ö3 Austria)^{[B]}	2
Belgian Albums (Ultratop Flanders)	3
Belgian Albums (Ultratop Wallonia)	16
Brazilian Albums Chart (ABPD)^{[A]}	1
Canadian Albums (Billboard)	1
Czech Albums (ČNS IFPI)	30
Danish Albums (Hitlisten)^{[B]}	7
Dutch Albums (Album Top 100)	4
European Top 100 Albums (Billboard)	3
Finnish Albums (Suomen virallinen lista)^{[A]}	13
French Albums (SNEP)^{[A]}	4
German Albums (Offizielle Top 100)^{[B]}	7
Greek Albums (IFPI)^{[A]}	4
Irish Albums (IRMA)^{[B]}	1
Italian Albums (FIMI)^{[A]}	13
Japanese Albums (Oricon)^{[A]}	3
Mexican Albums (Top 100 Mexico)^{[A]}	2
New Zealand Albums (RMNZ)^{[B]}	1
Norwegian Albums (VG-lista)^{[A]}	3
Polish Albums (OLiS)	9
Portuguese Albums (AFP)^{[B]}	2
Scottish Albums (OCC)^{[A]}	3
South Korean Albums (Circle)^{[A]}	24
South Korean International Albums (Circle)^{[A]}	8
Spanish Albums (PROMUSICAE)^{[A]}	1
Swedish Albums (Sverigetopplistan)^{[A]}	17
Swiss Albums (Schweizer Hitparade)^{[A]}	9
UK Albums (OCC)^{[B]}	3
US Billboard 200	1

Weekly chart performance for My World 2.0 and My Worlds
Chart (2026)	Peak position
Japanese Hot Albums (Billboard Japan)	48
Lithuanian Albums (AGATA)	56

=== Year-end charts ===
Year-end chart performance for My World 2.0
Chart (2010)	Position
Australian Albums (ARIA)^{[A]}	12
Belgian Albums (Ultratop Flanders)	40
Belgian Albums (Ultratop Wallonia)	93
Brazilian Albums Chart (ABPD)^{[A]}	2
Canadian Albums (Billboard)	7
Danish Albums (Hitlisten)^{[A]}	24
Dutch Albums (Album Top 100)	40
Irish Albums (IRMA)^{[B]}	10
Italian Albums (FIMI)^{[A]}	71
Japanese Albums (Oricon)^{[A]}	91
Mexican Albums (Top 100 Mexico)^{[A]}	3
New Zealand Albums (RMNZ)^{[B]}	4
South Korean International Albums (Circle)^{[A]}	30
Spanish Albums (PROMUSICAE)^{[A]}	6
Swedish Albums & Compilations (Sverigetopplistan)^{[A]}	71
Swiss Albums (Schweizer Hitparade)^{[A]}	40
UK Albums (OCC)^{[B]}	12
US Billboard 200	5
US Digital Albums (Billboard)	21
Worldwide Albums (IFPI)	9
Chart (2011)	Position
Australian Albums (ARIA)^{[A]}	22
Canadian Albums (Billboard)	34
Danish Albums (Hitlisten)^{[A]}	36
Dutch Albums (Album Top 100)	81
Mexican Albums (Top 100 Mexico)^{[A]}	29
New Zealand Albums (RMNZ)^{[B]}	37
South Korean International Albums (Circle)^{[A]}	62
Spanish Albums (PROMUSICAE)^{[A]}	16
Swedish Albums & Compilations (Sverigetopplistan)^{[A]}	79
Swiss Albums (Schweizer Hitparade)^{[A]}	63
US Billboard 200	18

=== Decade-end charts ===
Decade-end chart performance for My World 2.0
Chart (2010–2019)	Position
Australian Albums (ARIA)	43
US Billboard 200	22

- A Territories where My Worlds was released.
- B Territories where My Worlds was released, and charted in conjunction with My World; sales are also combined.

== Certifications ==
Certifications for My World 2.0
Region	Certification	Certified units/sales
Canada (Music Canada)	3× Platinum	240,000^{^}
Singapore (RIAS)	Platinum	10,000^{*}
United Kingdom (BPI)	Gold	100,000^{‡}
United States (RIAA)	4× Platinum	4,000,000^{‡}
^{*} Sales figures based on certification alone.^{^} Shipments figures based on certification alone.^{‡} Sales+streaming figures based on certification alone.

Certifications for My Worlds
Region	Certification	Certified units/sales
Argentina (CAPIF)	Gold	20,000^{^}
Australia (ARIA)	3× Platinum	210,000^{^}
Belgium (BRMA)	Platinum	30,000^{*}
Brazil (Pro-Música Brasil)	Diamond	160,000^{*}
Denmark (IFPI Danmark)	Platinum	30,000^{^}
GCC (IFPI Middle East)	Gold	3,000^{*}
Italy (FIMI)	Platinum	50,000^{*}
Japan (RIAJ)	Gold	100,000^{^}
Lebanon (IFPI Middle East)	Gold	1,000
Mexico (AMPROFON)	Platinum+Gold	90,000^{^}
Netherlands (NVPI)	Platinum	50,000^{^}
New Zealand (RMNZ)	2× Platinum	30,000^{^}
Norway (IFPI Norway)	Platinum	30,000^{*}
Portugal (AFP)	Gold	10,000^{^}
Spain (Promusicae)	2× Platinum	120,000^{^}
Switzerland (IFPI Switzerland)	Platinum	30,000^{^}
^{*} Sales figures based on certification alone.^{^} Shipments figures based on certification alone.

== Release history ==
Release history for My World 2.0
Country	Date	Label	Format	Edition
Poland	March 19, 2010	Universal Music	CD, digital download	Standard, My Worlds
Germany	March 19, 2010	Universal Music	CD, digital download	Standard, My Worlds
France	March 22, 2010	Universal Music	CD, digital download	My Worlds
Worldwide	March 23, 2010	Universal Music	CD, digital download	My Worlds
Canada	March 23, 2010	Universal Music	CD, digital download	Standard
United States	March 23, 2010	Island Records	CD, digital download	Standard
Australia	March 26, 2010	Universal Music	CD	Standard
United Kingdom	March 21, 2010	Mercury Records	Digital download	My Worlds
United Kingdom	March 22, 2010	Mercury Records	CD	My Worlds
Brazil	March 23, 2010	Universal Music	CD, digital download	My Worlds
Australia	April 2, 2010	Universal Music	Digital download	Standard
Australia	April 23, 2010	Universal Music	CD, digital download	My Worlds (Australian edition)
Japan	May 19, 2010	Universal Music	CD, CD+DVD	My Worlds
Worldwide	February 12, 2016	Universal Music	Vinyl	Standard

- My Worlds is a re-release of My World (2009) with the 10 new tracks of My World 2.0 added.

== See also ==
- Justin Bieber discography
