= Chris Hicks (record executive) =

American record producer

Christopher Hicks is an American record industry executive, artist manager, and publisher. He has worked with a plethora of artists, songwriters and producers including Justin Bieber, Mary J. Blige, LeToya Luckett, Aaliyah, Johnta Austin, Bryan-Michael Cox, The-Dream, T.I., Timbaland, Lil Wayne, Justice League, Jennifer Lopez and Usher to name a few. Hicks has previously held the positions of Senior Vice President/Head of Urban Music at Warner Chappell Music Publishing as well as Executive Vice President position at Island Def Jam Music Group. Currently he is CEO of Content Media Group based in Atlanta.
