= List of Justin Bieber live performances =

Justin Bieber live performances
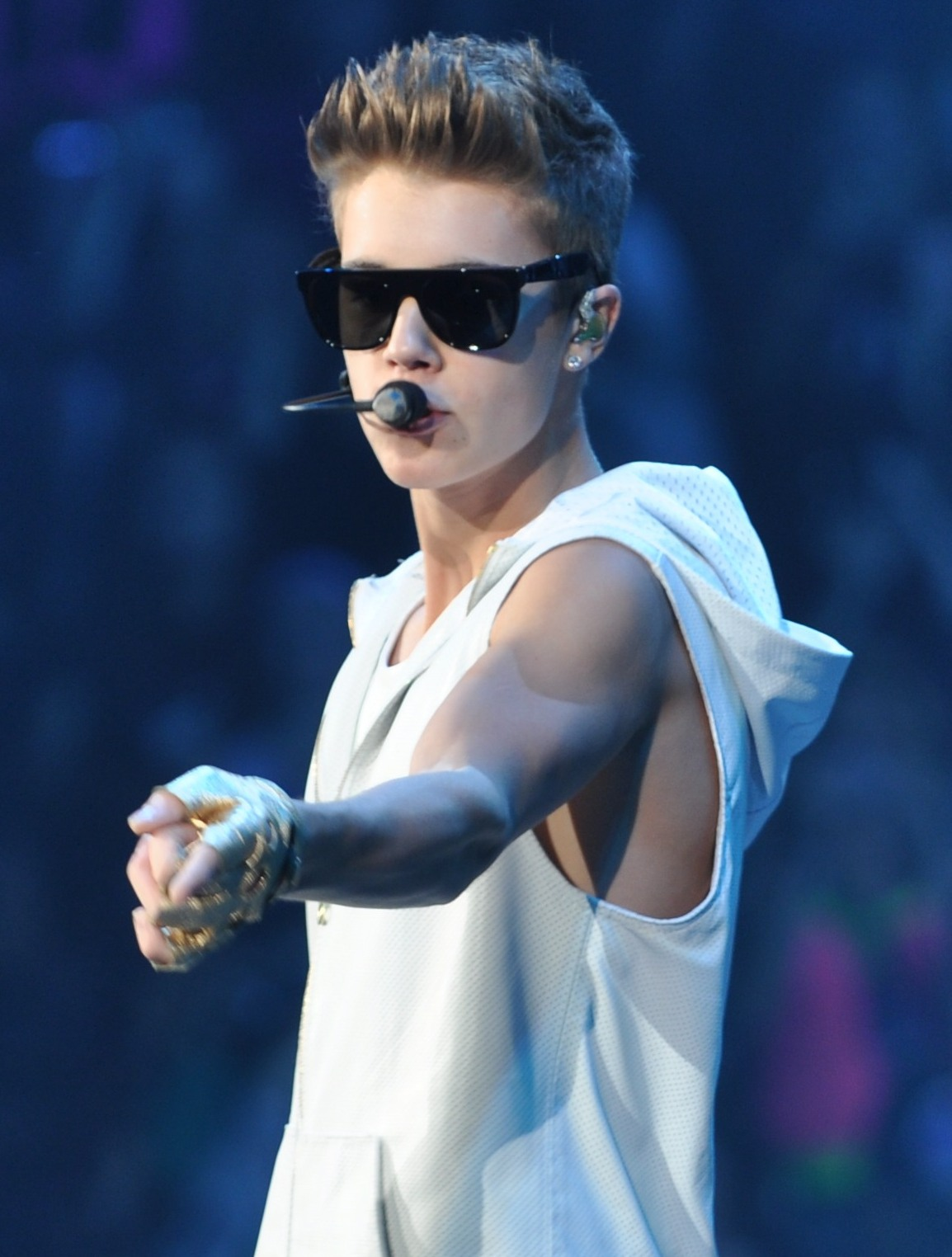
- Bieber performing during the Believe Tour (2012).
- Concert tours: 8
- Promotional tours: 4
- Live performances: 193

Canadian singer Justin Bieber has released several albums since his debut in 2009, leading to four concert tours (all of them worldwide), and numerous TV and award show performances. He first released an extended play titled My World in November 2009. The EP was promoted throughout 2009 with performances at several award ceremonies and television shows, including the Summer Rush and the Jingle Ball, as well as his first promotional tour, the Urban Behavior Tour. In 2009, Bieber was also the opening act on selected dates of Taylor Swift's Fearless Tour. In March 2010, he released his first studio album, My World 2.0, which included the hit single "Baby." A tour in support of the album, titled the My World Tour, began in June 2010 and ended in October 2011 after 127 shows. In February 2011, he released his first documentary film, Never Say Never. The soundtrack to the film was released the same day. Nine months later, in November 2011, he released Under the Mistletoe, his first Christmas album.

In June 2012, Bieber released his second studio album, Believe. The album was promoted through several performances, including the iHeartRadio MuchMusic Video Awards and the Summertime Ball. The Believe Tour, supporting the album, began in the United States in September 2012 and concluded in December 2013 in Australia after 155 concerts. In January 2013, the acoustic version of the album was released. In December 2013, Bieber released his second compilation album, Journals. No tour in support of Journals was booked, and it was not promoted.

Three and a half years later, Bieber released his third studio album, Purpose, in November 2015. The album was promoted through various award show performances, including the 2015 MTV Video Music Awards and the American Music Awards. The Purpose World Tour began in Seattle in March 2016. Bieber began performing in stadiums starting with the Latin American leg in February 2017. The tour was initially scheduled to end in Singapore in October 2017 but concluded in July 2017 instead due to mental and physical exhaustion. According to Pollstar, the Purpose World Tour grossed $163.3 million and sold 1,761,642 tickets in 2016, and the 29 shows in 2017 grossed $93.7 million with 1,043,839 tickets sold. Overall, the tour had a total gross of $257 million and an attendance of 2,805,481 across 162 shows.

== Concert tours ==
Title	Dates	Associated album(s)	Continent(s)	Shows	Gross	Attendance	Ref.
My World Tour	June 23, 2010 – October 20, 2011	My World My World 2.0	Asia; Europe; Oceania; North America; South America	127	$53,300,000	808,271	
My World Tour setlist: 1. "Love Me"; 2. "Bigger"; 3. "U Smile"; 4. "Runaway Love"; 5. "Never Let You Go"; 6. "Favorite Girl"; 7. "One Less Lonely Girl"; 8. "Somebody to Love"; 9. "Overboard"; 10. "Never Say Never"; 11. "Up"; 12. "One Time"; 13. "That Should Be Me"; 14. "Wanna Be Startin' Somethin'" / "Walk This Way" (Medley); 15. "Eenie Meenie"; 16. "Down to Earth"; 17. "Baby"
Believe Tour	September 29, 2012 – December 8, 2013	Believe	Africa; Asia; Europe; Oceania; North America; South America	155	$210,000,000	1,694,897	
Believe Tour setlist: 1. "All Around the World"; 2. "Take You"; 3. "Catching Feelings"; 4. "One Time" / "Eenie Meenie" / "Somebody to Love" (Medley); 5. "Love Me Like You Do"; 6. "She Don't Like the Lights"; 7. "Die in Your Arms"; 8. "Out of Town Girl"; 9. "Be Alright"; 10. "Fall"; 11. "Never Say Never"; 12. "Beauty and a Beat"; 13. "One Less Lonely Girl"; 14. "As Long As You Love Me"; 15. "Believe"; 16. "Boyfriend"; 17. "Baby"
Purpose World Tour	March 9, 2016 – July 2, 2017	Purpose	Africa; Asia; Europe; Oceania; North America; South America	162	$256,384,056	2,851,752	
Purpose World Tour setlist: 1. "Mark My Words"; 2. "Where Are Ü Now"; 3. "Get Used to It"; 4. "I'll Show You"; 5. "The Feeling"; 6. "Boyfriend"; 7. "Home to Mama" / "Cold Water"; 8. "Love Yourself"; 9. "Been You"; 10. "Company"; 11. "No Sense"; 12. "Hold Tight"; 13. "No Pressure"; 14. "As Long As You Love Me"; 15. "Children"; 16. "Let Me Love You" (Added at the European 1st leg); 17. "Life is Worth Living"; 18. "What Do You Mean?"; 19. "Baby"; 20. "Purpose"; 21. "Sorry"
Justice World Tour	February 18, 2022 – September 4, 2022	Changes Justice	North America; Europe; South America	49	$89,107,888	636,861	
Justice World Tour setlist: 1. "Somebody"; 2. "Hold On"; 3. "Deserve You"; 4. "Holy"; 5. "Where Are Ü Now"; 6. "What Do You Mean?"; 7. "Yummy"; 8. "Changes"; 9. "Love Yourself"; 10. "Off My Face"; 11. "Confident"; 12. "All That Matters"; 13. "Don't Go"; 14. "Sorry"; 15. "Love You Different"; 16. "As I Am"; 17. "Ghost"; 18. "Lonely"; 19. "2 Much"; 20. "Intentions"; 21. "Boyfriend"; 22. "Baby"; Encore: 23. "Peaches"; 24. "Anyone"

== Promotional tours ==
Title	Dates	Associated album(s)	Continent(s)	Shows	Gross	Attendance	Ref.
Urban Behavior Tour	November 1, 2009 – November 6, 2009	My World	North America	5	—N/a	—N/a	
Urban Behavior Tour setlist Unknown
Believe Promotional Tour	May 30, 2012 – June 11, 2012	Believe	North America	5	—N/a	—N/a	
Believe Promotional Tour setlist Unknown
An Evening with Justin Bieber	November 18, 2015 – December 7, 2015	Purpose	North America	3	—N/a	—N/a	
An Evening with Justin Bieber setlist Unknown
T-Mobile New Year's Eve Live with Justin Bieber	December 31, 2020 – January 1, 2021	Changes	Worldwide	3 (1 live stream, 2 repeat play)	—N/a	+7,000,000	
T-Mobile New Year's Eve Live with Justin Bieber setlist: 1. "All Around Me"; 2. "Sorry"; 3. "Second Emotion"; 4. "Forever" - Followed by Countdown; 5. "Boyfriend"; 6. "Baby"; 7. "I'm the One" / "No Brainer"; 8. "Love Yourself"; 9. "All That Matters"; 10. "Sorry"; 11. "Where Are Ü Now"; 12. "What Do You Mean?"; 13. "Running Over"; 14. "Come Around Me"; 15. "Get Me"; 16. "Yummy"; 17. "Habitual"; 18. "Holy"; 19. "Intentions"; 20. "Monster"; 21. "Lonely"; 22. "Anyone" (live debut)

== Live performances ==
=== My World era ===
Date	Event	City	Performed song(s)
May 7, 2009	The Kidd Kraddick Morning Show	Irving	"Respect"
June 20, 2009	Mix 93.3 Red White & Boom 14	Kansas City	"One Time"
July 8, 2009	MuchOnDemand	Toronto	"One Time"
July 25, 2009	Summer Rush 2009	Dartmouth	"Bigger", "Never Let You Go", "One Less Lonely Girl", "One Time"
August 7, 2009	MuchMusic Live Chat	Toronto	"One Less Lonely Girl", "One Time"
August 11, 2009	WFLZ-FM	Tampa	"One Time"
August 21, 2009	The Dome 51	Cologne	"One Time", "Cry Me a River" (Justin Timberlake cover)
August 28, 2009	Six Flags Concert Series	Jackson	"One Time", "One Less Lonely Girl", "Bigger", "Never Let You Go"
August 29, 2009	Arthur Ashe Kids' Day 2009	New York City	"One Time", "Bigger", "One Less Lonely Girl"
September 24, 2009	Engine Room	New York City	"One Time", "Bigger", "Never Let You Go", "One Less Lonely Girl"
September 26, 2009	The Next Star	Toronto	"One Less Lonely Girl", "One Time"
October 12, 2009	The Today Show	New York City	"One Less Lonely Girl", "One Time", "Favorite Girl"
November 3, 2009	The Ellen DeGeneres Show	Burbank	"Favorite Girl", "One Time"
November 15, 2009	Good Morning America	New York City	"One Time"
November 17, 2009	Lopez Tonight	New York City	"One Time"
November 19, 2009	It's On with Alexa Chung	New York City	"One Less Lonely Girl"
November 27, 2009	The Wendy Williams Show	New York City	"One Time"
December 10, 2009	Kiss 108's Jingle Ball	Lowell	"One Less Lonely Girl", "One Time", "No Air", "Love Me", "Favorite Girl"
December 11, 2009	Z100 Jingle Ball	New York City	"One Time", "Love Me", "No Air", "One Less Lonely Girl", "Favorite Girl"
December 14, 2009	Free concert at Citadel Outlets	Commerce	"One Time", "One Less Lonely Girl", "Favorite Girl"
December 16, 2009	Lupo's Heartbreak Hotel	Providence	"One Less Lonely Girl", "One Time"
December 22, 2009	Live@Much	Toronto	"Love Me", "Bigger", "One Less Lonely Girl", "Favorite Girl", "Baby", "Down to Earth", "Never Let You Go", "One Time"
January 12, 2010	Blue Peter	London	"One Time"

=== My World 2.0 era ===
Date	Event	City	Performed song(s)
February 5, 2010	VH1's Pepsi Super Bowl Fan Jam	Miami	"One Less Lonely Girl", "One Time"
February 6, 2010	SOS: Saving Ourselves – Help for Haiti Telethon	Los Angeles	"Baby" (with Ludacris)
February 14, 2010	Valentine's Day Special Concert	Hollywood	"Love Me", "Bigger", "Baby", "Never Let You Go", "Cry Me a River" (Justin Timberlake cover), "U Got It Bad" (Usher cover), "Favorite Girl", "Somebody to Love", "Eenie Meenie", "Common Denominator", "One Less Lonely Girl", "Wanna Be Startin' Somethin'" (Michael Jackson cover), "Down To Earth", "One Time", "With You" (Chris Brown cover)
February 20, 2010	Pop-Con 2010	Uniondale	"Love Me", "Bigger", "One Less Lonely Girl", "Cry Me a River", "U Got It Bad", "Never Let You Go", "Favorite Girl", "Wanna Be Startin' Somethin'", "Down to Earth", "One Time", "With You", "Baby"
March 5, 2010	The Dome 53	Berlin	"Love Me", "Baby"
March 6, 2010	Let's Dance for Sport Relief	London	"Baby"
March 15, 2010	iHeartRadio Live!	Los Angeles	"Eenie Meenie" (with Sean Kingston), "Baby"
March 17, 2010	The Ellen DeGeneres Show	Burbank	"Baby"
March 19, 2010	Studio 5	London	"Baby"
March 21, 2010	Rodeo Houston 2010	Houston	"Love Me", "Bigger", "One Less Lonely Girl", "Never Let You Go", "Favorite Girl", "Wanna Be Startin' Somethin'", "Walk This Way" (Aerosmith cover), "One Time", "Baby", "U Smile", "With You"
March 23, 2010	Late Show with David Letterman	New York City	"Baby"
March 25, 2010	Special Concert at Rosemont Theatre	Rosemont	"Love Me", "Bigger", "One Less Lonely Girl", "Never Let You Go", "Favorite Girl", "Down to Earth", "Wanna Be Startin' Somethin'", "Walk This Way", "One Time", "That Should Be Me", "Baby", "U Smile", "With You"
March 27, 2010	2010 Kids' Choice Awards	Los Angeles	"Baby"
April 5, 2010	Egg Roll 2010	Washington, D.C.	"One Time", "U Smile", "One Less Lonely Girl", "That Should Be Me", "Wanna Be Startin' Somethin'", "Walk This Way", "Baby"
April 10, 2010	Saturday Night Live	New York City	"Baby", "U Smile"
April 18, 2010	Juno Awards 2010	St. John's	"Baby"
April 21, 2010	Duo Music Exchange	Tokyo	"Love Me", "One Less Lonely Girl", "Because of You", "Favorite Girl", "One Time", "Baby"
April 26, 2010	Sunrise	Sydney	"Baby"
April 28, 2010	Strathallan College Sessions	Auckland	"One Time", "Baby"
April 30, 2010	M6 Mobile Music Live Montpellier 2010	Montpellier	"One Time", "Baby"
May 11, 2010	The Oprah Winfrey Show	Los Angeles	"Baby"
May 15, 2010	2010 Wango Tango	Los Angeles	"Love Me", "One Less Lonely Girl", "Somebody to Love", "U Smile", "One Time", "Wanna Be Startin' Somethin'", "Walk This Way", "Baby"
May 19, 2010	American Idol	Los Angeles	"U Smile", "Baby"
May 20, 2010	1 Live Acoustic Set	Cologne	"Somebody to Love"
May 21, 2010	VIVA Comet Awards 2010	Oberhausen	"Somebody to Love"
May 22, 2010	Radio 1's Big Weekend 2010	Bangor	"Love Me", "One Less Lonely Girl", "Somebody to Love", "U Smile", "One Time", ·Favorite Girl", "Wanna Be Startin' Somethin'", "Walk This Way", "Baby"
June 4, 2010	The Today Show	New York City	"One Time", "Never Say Never", "Somebody to Love", "Baby"
June 5, 2010	Fearless Tour Opening	Foxborough	"Love Me", "Bigger", "One Less Lonely Girl", "Favorite Girl", "Never Let You Go", "Down to Earth", "One Time", "With You"
June 6, 2010	Summertime Ball 2010	London	"Baby", "Eenie Meenie", "One Time"
June 20, 2010	MuchMusic Video Awards 2010	Toronto	"Somebody to Love", "Baby"
June 27, 2010	Summerfest 2010	Milwaukee	"Love Me", "Bigger", "U Smile", "Runaway Love", "Never Let You Go", "Favorite Girl", "One Less Lonely Girl", "Somebody to Love" ·"Up", "Overboard", "Never Say Never", "One Time", "Eenie Meenie", "That Should Be Me", "Wanna Be Startin' Somethin'", "Walk This Way", "Baby"
July 23, 2010	California Mid State Fair	Paso Robles	"Love Me", "Bigger", "U Smile", "Runaway Love", "Never Let You Go", "Favorite Girl", "One Less Lonely Girl", "Somebody to Love" ·"Up", "Overboard", "Never Say Never", "One Time", "Eenie Meenie", "That Should Be Me", "Wanna Be Startin' Somethin'", "Walk This Way", "Baby"
September 1, 2010	New York State Fair 2010	Syracuse	"Love Me", "Bigger", "U Smile", "Runaway Love", "Never Let You Go", "Favorite Girl", "One Less Lonely Girl", "Somebody to Love" ·"Up", "Overboard", "Never Say Never", "One Time", "Eenie Meenie", "That Should Be Me", "Wanna Be Startin' Somethin'", "Walk This Way", "Baby"
September 4, 2010	Pennsylvania State Fair	Allentown	"Love Me", "Bigger", "U Smile", "Runaway Love", "Never Let You Go", "Favorite Girl", "One Less Lonely Girl", "Somebody to Love" ·"Up", "Overboard", "Never Say Never", "One Time", "Eenie Meenie", "That Should Be Me", "Wanna Be Startin' Somethin'", "Walk This Way", "Baby"
September 5, 2010	Maryland State Fair	Timonium	"Love Me", "Bigger", "U Smile", "Runaway Love", "Never Let You Go", "Favorite Girl", "One Less Lonely Girl", "Somebody to Love" ·"Up", "Overboard", "Never Say Never", "One Time", "Eenie Meenie", "That Should Be Me", "Wanna Be Startin' Somethin'", "Walk This Way", "Baby"
September 12, 2010	MTV Video Music Awards 2010	Los Angeles	"U Smile", "Baby", "Somebody to Love"
November 21, 2010	American Music Awards 2010	Los Angeles	"Pray"
November 28, 2010	The X Factor (UK)	London	"Somebody to Love", "Baby"
December 4, 2010	Wetten, dass..?	Düsseldorf	"Somebody to Love"
February 13, 2011	53rd Grammy Awards	Los Angeles	"Baby", "Never Say Never"
March 19, 2011	Wetten, dass..?	Augsburg	"Pray", "Never Say Never"
October 8, 2011	Z Festival 2011	São Paulo	"Love Me", "Bigger", "U Smile", "Runaway Love", "Never Let You Go", "Favorite Girl", "One Less Lonely Girl", "Somebody to Love" ·"Up", "Overboard", "Never Say Never", "One Time", "Eenie Meenie", "That Should Be Me", "Wanna Be Startin' Somethin'", "Walk This Way", "Baby"
October 9, 2011	Z Festival 2011	São Paulo	"Love Me", "Bigger", "U Smile", "Runaway Love", "Never Let You Go", "Favorite Girl", "One Less Lonely Girl", "Somebody to Love" ·"Up", "Overboard", "Never Say Never", "One Time", "Eenie Meenie", "That Should Be Me", "Wanna Be Startin' Somethin'", "Walk This Way", "Baby"

=== Under the Mistletoe era ===
Date	Event	City	Performed song(s)
November 6, 2011	MTV Europe Music Awards 2011	Belfast	"Mistletoe", "Never Say Never"
November 10, 2011	Bambi Awards 2011	Berlin	"Mistletoe"
November 20, 2011	American Music Awards 2011	Los Angeles	"Mistletoe"
December 4, 2011	The X Factor (UK)	London	"Mistletoe"
December 22, 2011	The X Factor (USA)	Los Angeles	"Santa Claus Is Coming to Town"
December 25, 2011	Disney World Christmas	Orlando, Florida	"Mistletoe", "Santa Claus Is Coming to Town"

=== Believe era ===
Date	Event	City	Performed song(s)
May 8, 2012	The Voice U.S.	Universal City	"Boyfriend"
May 20, 2012	Billboard Music Awards 2012	Las Vegas	"Boyfriend"
May 30, 2012	Believe Promotional Tour	Oslo	"Baby", "All Around the World", "As Long As You Love Me", "Be Alright", "Never Let You Go", "Never Say Never", "Boyfriend"
June 2, 2012	Believe Promotional Tour	Milan	"All Around the World", "Take You", "Catching Feelings", "One Time", "Eenie Meenie", "Somebody to Love", "Love Me Like You Do", "She Don't Like the Lights", "Die in Your Arms", "Out of Town Girl", "Be Alright", "Fall", "Never Say Never", "Beauty and a Beat", "One Less Lonely Girl", "As Long As You Love Me", "Believe", "Boyfriend", "Baby"
June 7, 2012	Germany's Next Topmodel	Cologne	"Boyfriend"
June 7, 2012	Believe Promotional Tour	Cologne	"All Around the World", "Take You", "Catching Feelings", "One Time", "Eenie Meenie", "Somebody to Love", "Love Me Like You Do", "She Don't Like the Lights", "Die in Your Arms", "Out of Town Girl", "Be Alright", "Fall", "Never Say Never", "Beauty and a Beat", "One Less Lonely Girl", "As Long As You Love Me", "Believe", "Boyfriend", "Baby"
June 9, 2012	Summertime Ball 2012	London	"Somebody to Love", "Baby", "All Around the World", "Die in Your Arms", "Turn to You", "One Less Lonely Girl", "Never Say Never", "Boyfriend"
June 11, 2012	Mexico City Free Concert	Mexico City	"Baby", "As Long As You Love Me", "U Smile", "One Less Lonely Girl", "One Time", "Never Let You Go", "Die in Your Arms", "Be Alright", "Up", "Somebody to Love", "Eenie Meenie", "Live My Life", "All Around the World", "Call me Maybe", "Never Say Never", "Boyfriend", "With You"
June 15, 2012	The Today Show	New York City	"Boyfriend", "As Long As You Love Me" (with Big Sean), "Baby"
June 17, 2012	2012 MuchMusic Video Awards	Toronto	"All Around the World", "Boyfriend"
June 18, 2012	Macy's Presents: Believe	New York City	"All Around the World", "Take You", "Catching Feelings", "One Time", "Eenie Meenie", "Somebody to Love", "Love Me Like You Do", "She Don't Like the Lights", "Die in Your Arms", "Out of Town Girl", "Be Alright", "Fall", "Never Say Never", "Beauty and a Beat", "One Less Lonely Girl", "As Long As You Love Me", "Believe", "Boyfriend", "Baby"
June 21, 2012	Late Show With David Letterman	New York City	"Boyfriend"
July 14, 2012	MTV World Stage: Live in Malaysia 2012	Kuala Lumpur	"Baby", "Die in Your Arms", "One Time", "All Around the World", "As Long As You Love Me", "Be Alright", "Boyfriend"
July 17, 2012	Today Tonight	Sydney	"Die in Your Arms", "Be Alright", "Baby", "Catching Feelings", "All Around the World", "As Long As You Love Me", "Boyfriend"
July 19, 2012	Acoustic Live!	Auckland	"As Long As You Love Me", "Take You", "Fall", "Thought Of You", "Take You", "All Around the World", "Catching Feelings", "One Less Lonely Girl", "Baby", "Boyfriend"
July 22, 2012	Teen Choice Awards 2012	Universal City	"Boyfriend", "As Long As You Love Me"
September 12, 2012	Maida Vale Studios	London	"As Long As You Love Me", "Boyfriend", "Catching Feelings", "Fall"
September 14, 2012	America's Got Talent	Los Angeles	"As Long As You Love Me" (with Big Sean)
September 25, 2012	Dancing with the Stars	Los Angeles	"As Long As You Love Me"
November 7, 2012	Victoria's Secret Fashion Show 2012	New York City	"Beauty and A Beat", "Boyfriend"
November 18, 2012	American Music Awards 2012	Los Angeles	"As Long As You Love Me", "Beauty and A Beat"
November 25, 2012	100th Grey Cup	Toronto	"Boyfriend", "Beauty and the Beat"
December 3, 2012	KIIS FM's Jingle Ball	Los Angeles	"All Around the World", "Beauty and a Beat", "Be Alright", "Fall", "Mistletoe", "As Long As You Love Me", "Boyfriend", "Baby"
December 5, 2012	Q102's Jingle Ball2	Philadelphia	"All Around the World", "Beauty and a Beat", "Die in Your Arms", "Be Alright", "Fall", "Christmas Eve", "As Long As You Love Me", "Boyfriend", "Baby"
December 6, 2012	Kiss 108's Jingle Ball2	Boston	"All Around the World", "Beauty and a Beat", "Be Alright", "Fall", "Mistletoe", "As Long As You Love Me", "Boyfriend", "Baby"
December 7, 2012	Z100 Jingle Ball2	New York City	"All Around the World", "Beauty and a Beat", "Die in Your Arms", "Be Alright", "Fall", "Christmas Eve", "As Long As You Love Me", "Boyfriend", "Baby"
December 9, 2012	93.3 FLZ Jingle Ball	Tampa	"All Around the World", "Beauty and a Beat", "Die in Your Arms", "Be Alright", "Fall", "Christmas Eve", "As Long As You Love Me", "Boyfriend", "Baby"
December 11, 2012	Hot 99.5 Jingle Ball	Fairfax	"All Around the World", "Beauty and a Beat", "Be Alright", "Fall", "Mistletoe", "As Long As You Love Me", "Boyfriend", "Baby"
December 12, 2012	Power 96.1's Jingle Ball	Atlanta	"All Around the World", "Beauty and a Beat", "Die in Your Arms", "Be Alright", "Fall", "Christmas Eve", "As Long As You Love Me", "Boyfriend", "Baby"
December 13, 2012	The Ellen DeGeneres Show	Burbank	"As Long As You Love Me"
December 15, 2012	B96 Jingle Bash	Rosemont	"All Around the World", "Beauty and a Beat", "Die in Your Arms", "Be Alright", "Fall", "Christmas Eve", "As Long As You Love Me", "Boyfriend", "Baby"
February 9, 2013	Saturday Night Live	New York City	"As Long As You Love Me", "Nothing Like Us"
May 19, 2013	Billboard Music Awards 2013	Las Vegas	"Take You", "#thatPower"
November 9, 2013	Z Festival Argentina 2013	Buenos Aires	Believe Tour setlist
November 10, 2013	Z Festival Argentina 2013	Buenos Aires	Believe Tour setlist
December 31, 2013	Dick Clark's New Year's Rockin' Eve 2014	New York City	"Beauty and a Beat", "As Long As You Love Me", "Boyfriend"
April 13, 2014	Surprise Guest at Coachella 2014	Indio	"Confident"

=== Purpose era ===
Date	Event	City	Performed song(s)
January 20, 2015	Special Concert at State Social House	Hollywood	"Home to Mama", "I'll Be"
March 13, 2015	Secret Show at Nice Guy Restaurant	Hollywood	"Boyfriend", "Baby", "So Sick", "As Long As You Love Me"
April 8, 2015	Special Guest at The Honeymoon Tour	Inglewood	"Love Me Harder", "Where Are Ü Now", "As Long As You Love Me" (with Ariana Grande)
May 9, 2015	Wango Tango 2015	Carson	"Boyfriend", "Beauty and a Beat", "All That Matters", "Hold Tight", "As Long As You Love Me", "Where Are Ü Now"
May 20, 2015	The Late Late Show with James Corden	Los Angeles	"Baby", "Boyfriend", "Where Are Ü Now", "End of the Road"
June 11, 2015	Calvin Klein Jeans Music Event	Hong Kong	"As Long As You Love Me", "Baby", "Beauty and a Beat", "Boyfriend"· "Where Are Ü Now"
August 23, 2015	Billboard Hot 100 Music Festival 2015	Wantagh	"Boyfriend", "Beauty and a Beat", "As Long As You Love Me", "Hold Tight", "All That Matters", "Be Alright", "All I Do Is Win" (DJ Khaled cover), "Where Are Ü Now"
August 30, 2015	2015 MTV Video Music Awards	Los Angeles	"Where Are Ü Now", "What Do You Mean?"
September 2, 2015	The Tonight Show Starring Jimmy Fallon	New York City	"What Do You Mean?"
September 10, 2015	The Today Show	New York City	"What Do You Mean?", "Where Are Ü Now", "Boyfriend", "Baby", "As Long As You Love Me"
September 11, 2015	Think It Up 2015	Santa Monica	"What Do You Mean?"
September 28, 2015	World Famous Rooftop	Melbourne	"All That Matters", "What Do You Mean?", "As Long As You Love Me", "Boyfriend", "Baby"
September 29, 2015	X Factor (Australia)	Sydney	"What Do You Mean?"
September 30, 2015	Bieber Island Event	Sydney	"What Do You Mean?", "Where Are Ü Now", "Boyfriend", "All That Matters", "As Long As You Love Me", "Hold Tight", "That Should Be Me", "Home to Mama", "Be Alright", "Baby"
October 1, 2015	The Edge	Auckland	"Home to Mama", "As Long As You Love Me", "All That Matters", "Boyfriend", "Baby"
October 17, 2015	American Junkie	Hermosa Beach	"What Do You Mean?"
October 22, 2015	The Graham Norton Show	London	"What Do You Mean?"
October 23, 2015	TFI Friday	London	"What Do You Mean?"
October 24, 2015	Schlag den Raab	Cologne	"What Do You Mean?"
October 24, 2015	1LIVE Salon	Cologne	"What Do You Mean?"
October 25, 2015	MTV Europe Music Awards 2015	Milan	"What Do You Mean?"
October 27, 2015	X Factor (Italy)	Milan	"What Do You Mean?"
October 28, 2015	El Hormiguero 3.0	Madrid	"What Do You Mean?"
October 29, 2015	Senkveld	Oslo	"What Do You Mean?", "As Long As You Love Me", "Hold Tight"
October 29, 2015	Chateau Neuf	Oslo	"Boyfriend"
November 6, 2015	Alan Carr: Chatty Man	London	"What Do You Mean?"
November 7, 2015	NRJ Music Awards 2015	Cannes	"What Do You Mean?"
November 8, 2015	BBC Radio 1's Teen Awards 2015	London	"Where Are Ü Now", "Boyfriend", "What Do You Mean?"
November 13, 2015	Purpose Release Party	Los Angeles	"What Do You Mean?", "Boyfriend", "Love Yourself", "Never Say Never", "Sorry", "One Less Lonely Girl", "I'll Show You"
November 17, 2015	The Tonight Show Starring Jimmy Fallon	New York City	"Sorry"
November 18, 2015	The Today Show	New York City	"Sorry", "What Do You Mean?", "The Feeling" (with Halsey), "No Pressure", "Love Yourself", "Company", "Home to Mama"
November 18, 2015	The Late Late Show with James Corden	Los Angeles	"Never Say Never", "What Do You Mean?", "Stronger", "Ironic", "Sorry"
November 18, 2015	An Evening with Justin Bieber	Rosemont	"Hold Tight", "What Do You Mean?", "As Long As You Love Me", "Home to Mama", "Love Yourself", "One Less Lonely Girl", "Down to Earth", "One Time", "I'll Show You", "Sorry", "Purpose"
November 19, 2015	An Evening with Justin Bieber	Houston	"Hold Tight", "What Do You Mean?", "As Long As You Love Me", "Home to Mama", "Love Yourself", "One Less Lonely Girl", "Down to Earth", "One Time", "I'll Show You", "Sorry", "Purpose"
November 22, 2015	American Music Awards 2015	Los Angeles	"What Do You Mean?", "Where Are Ü Now", "Sorry"
November 25, 2015	The Ellen DeGeneres Show	Burbank	"Sorry", "What Do You Mean?"
December 6, 2015	Capital FM Jingle Bell Ball	London	"Where Are Ü Now", "Boyfriend", "Love Yourself", "Home to Mama", "Hold Tight", "As Long As You Love Me", "What Do You Mean?", "Sorry"
December 7, 2015	An Evening with Justin Bieber	Toronto	"What Do You Mean?", "I'll Show You", "Purpose", "Christmas Eve", "Christmas Love", "Mistletoe", "Hotline Bling" (Drake cover), "Love Yourself", "Baby", "Home to Mama", "All That Matters", "Boyfriend", "Hold Tight", "Be Alright", "Trust", "One Less Lonely Girl", "So Sick" (Ne‐Yo cover), "Down to Earth", "Fast Car" (Tracy Chapman cover), "One Time", "Sorry", "Let It Be" (The Beatles cover), "Nothing Like Us", "As Long As You Love Me"
December 16, 2015	The Voice US	Universal City	"Sorry"
February 15, 2016	58th Grammy Awards	Los Angeles	"Love Yourself", "Where Are Ü Now"
February 16, 2016	The Late Late Show with James Corden	Los Angeles	"Uptown Funk" (Mark Ronson cover)
February 24, 2016	BRIT Awards 2016	London	"Love Yourself", "Sorry"
May 22, 2016	2016 Billboard Music Awards	Las Vegas	"Company", "Sorry"
August 20, 2016	V Festival 2016	Chelmsford	Purpose World Tour setlist
August 21, 2016	V Festival 2016	Stafford	Purpose World Tour setlist
September 1, 2016	Live Lounge	London	"What Do You Mean?", "Let Me Love You", "Fast Car", "Thugz Mansion" (2Pac cover), "Cold Water", "Love Yourself"
December 2, 2016	KIIS FM's Jingle Ball	Los Angeles	"Where Are Ü Now", "Company", "Cold Water", "Love Yourself", "Fast Car", "What Do You Mean?", "Let Me Love You", "Sorry"
December 3, 2016	Triple Ho Show 7.00	San Jose	"Where Are Ü Now", "Company", "Cold Water", "Love Yourself", "Fast Car", "What Do You Mean?", "Let Me Love You", "Sorry"
December 5, 2016	The Ellen DeGeneres Show	Burbank	"Cold Water"
December 9, 2016	Z100 Jingle Ball6	New York City	"Where Are Ü Now", "Company", "Cold Water", "Love Yourself", "Fast Car", "What Do You Mean?", "Let Me Love You", "Sorry"
January 1, 2017	Justin Bieber X Skrillex X Marshmello	Miami Beach	"Where Are Ü Now", "Company", "Cold Water", "Love Yourself", "Let Me Love You", "Sorry"
June 3, 2017	Pinkpop Festival 2017	Landgraaf	Purpose World Tour setlist
June 4, 2017	One Love Manchester	Manchester	"Love Yourself", "Cold Water"
June 7, 2017	Den Store Sommerfesten 2017	Stavanger	Purpose World Tour setlist
June 10, 2017	Summerburst Stockholm 2017	Stockholm	Purpose World Tour setlist
June 18, 2017	I-Days 2017	Monza	Purpose World Tour setlist
June 24, 2017	North Summer Festival 2017	Villeneuve-d'Ascq	Purpose World Tour setlist
June 25, 2017	Wireless Festival Germany 2017	Frankfurt	Purpose World Tour setlist
July 2, 2017	British Summer Time 2017	London	Purpose World Tour setlist
August 28, 2017	The Peppermint Club	Hollywood	"Caught Up"
June 28, 2018	Special Guest at Post Malone's Concert	Hollywood	"Deja Vu"
April 21, 2019	Surprise Guest at Coachella 2019	Indio	"Sorry"

=== Changes era ===
Date	Event	City	Performed song(s)
January 28, 2020	The Ellen DeGeneres Show	Burbank	"Yummy"
February 8, 2020	Saturday Night Live	New York City	"Yummy", "Intentions"
February 14, 2020	The Tonight Show Starring Jimmy Fallon	New York City	"Intentions"
March 4, 2020	The Ellen DeGeneres Show	Burbank	"Intentions"
November 11, 2020	Country Music Awards	Nashville	"10,000 Hours"

=== Justice era ===
Date	Event	City	Performed song(s)
October 18, 2020	Saturday Night Live	New York City	"Holy", "Lonely"
November 22, 2020	2020 American Music Awards	Los Angeles	"Lonely", "Holy", "Monster"
January 1, 2021	T-Mobile NYE LIVE	Beverly Hills	"Anyone", 21-song set
February 14, 2021	The Drew House	Tiktok	"Confident", "All That Matters", 11-song set
March 13, 2021	2021 Nickelodeon Kids' Choice Awards	Santa Monica	"Hold On", "Anyone"
March 17, 2021	Tiny Desk	Washington D.C.	"Holy", "Peaches", "Hold On", "Anyone"
March 22, 2021	Good Morning America	New York City	"Hold On"
April 13, 2021	Hotel De Crillon, Paris France	Paris	"Hold On", "Somebody", "Unstable", 5-song set
May 25, 2021	The Voice	Universal City	"Peaches", "Hold On"
June 6, 2021	2021 Juno Awards	Toronto	"Somebody"
June 30, 2021	Wango Tango	Southern California	"Peaches", "Hold On", "Somebody", "Love You Different"
July 9, 2021	Encore Theater, Wynn Las Vegas	Las Vegas	"Stay", 18-song set
October 10, 2021	XS Nightclub, Wynn Las Vegas	Las Vegas	"Where Are You Now", "Cold Water", "Peaches", "Sorry", "What Do You Mean"
October 11, 2021	Delilah, Wynn Las Vegas	Las Vegas	"Hold On", "Holy", "Peaches", "Confident", "What Do You Mean", "Stay"
April 3, 2022	64th Grammy Awards	Las Vegas	"Peaches"
April 15, 2022	Surprise Guest at Coachella 2022	Indio	"Peaches"
March 4, 2023	Rolling Loud	Las Vegas	"Private Landing"
April 14, 2024	Surprise Guest at Coachella 2024	Indio	"Essence" (remix)

=== Swag era ===
Date	Event	City	Performed song(s)
February 1, 2026	68th Grammy Awards	Los Angeles	"Yukon"
April 11, 2026	Coachella	Indio	TBD
April 18, 2026	Coachella	Indio	TBD
July 19, 2026	Fifa World Cup	New Jersey	"Everything Hallelujah"
