= My World Tour =

2010–2011 concert tour by Justin Bieber

- World tour by Justin Bieber
- Promotional poster for the tour
- Location: Asia; Europe; North America; Oceania; South America
- Associated album: My World; My World 2.0
- Start date: June 23, 2010
- End date: October 19, 2011
- Legs: 8
- No. of shows: 126
- Box office: US$53.3 million ($76.28 million in 2025 dollars)

Justin Bieber concert chronology
- My World Tour (2010–2011); Believe Tour (2012–2013)

The My World Tour was the debut concert tour by Canadian singer Justin Bieber. It is Bieber's first concert tour which supports his two-part debut EP and debut studio album My World (2009) and My World 2.0 (2010). The tour was officially announced on March 16, 2010, a week before My World 2.0 was released. The tour has multiple legs with the supporting acts of Mindless Behavior, Sean Kingston and Jessica Jarrell on North American dates and pop girl group The Stunners also joined the tour for the first twenty dates. Jasmine Villegas joined the tour as the opening act for the second leg. The first leg of the tour is estimated to have grossed US$35.6 million post inflation. The tour grossed over $53 million worldwide according to Jeetendr Sehdev of The Guardian.

== Announcement ==
The tour was officially announced on March 16, 2010, a week before the release of his debut studio album, My World 2.0. In an interview with the Houston Chronicle, when asked about what fans could expect on the tour, Bieber stated, "I want to show that I love to perform. There are going to be some cool tricks, some electronic things that haven't been seen before, for sure."

== Setlist ==
1. "Love Me"
2. "Bigger"
3. "U Smile"
4. "Runaway Love"
5. "Never Let You Go"
6. "Favorite Girl"
7. "One Less Lonely Girl"
8. "Somebody to Love"
9. "Overboard"
10. "Never Say Never"
11. "Up"
12. "One Time"
13. "That Should Be Me"
14. "Wanna Be Startin' Somethin'" / "Walk This Way"
15. "Eenie Meenie"
16. "Down to Earth"
17. "Baby"

Setlist per official tour book.

== Tour dates ==
Date	City	Country	Venue	Tickets sold / Available	Gross revenue
North America
June 23, 2010	Hartford	United States	XL Center	13,132 / 13,132 (100%)	$385,790
June 24, 2010	Trenton	United States	Sun National Bank Center	7,523 / 7,523 (100%)	$266,285
June 26, 2010	Cincinnati	United States	U.S. Bank Arena	10,758 / 12,780 (90%)	$405,545
June 27, 2010^{[A]}	Milwaukee	United States	Marcus Amphitheater	21,772 / 28,572 (86%)	$723,549
June 29, 2010	Minneapolis	United States	Target Center	14,717 / 14,717 (100%)	$339,226
June 30, 2010	Des Moines	United States	Wells Fargo Arena	9,399 / 9,650 (97%)	$232,560
July 2, 2010	Moline	United States	iWireless Center	10,610 / 10,610 (100%)	$393,090
July 3, 2010	Omaha	United States	Qwest Center Omaha	11,682 / 12,093 (94%)	$224,563
July 5, 2010	Grand Prairie	United States	Verizon Theatre at Grand Prairie	6,000 / 6,000 (100%)	$103,550
July 6, 2010	Tulsa	United States	BOK Center	12,993 / 12,993 (100%)	$384,810
July 8, 2010	Broomfield	United States	1stBank Center	6,207 / 6,207 (100%)	$315,185
July 10, 2010	West Valley City	United States	Maverik Center	10,362 / 10,362 (100%)	$187,135
July 13, 2010	Everett	United States	Comcast Arena at Everett	8,588 / 8,588 (100%)	$110,172
July 14, 2010	Portland	United States	Rose Garden	13,244 / 13,244 (100%)	$345,598
July 17, 2010	Oakland	United States	Oracle Arena	14,555 / 14,555 (100%)	$293,921
July 18, 2010	Reno	United States	Reno Events Center	6,583 / 6,583 (100%)	$116,022
July 20, 2010	Los Angeles	United States	Nokia Theatre L.A. Live	6,673 / 6,673 (100%)	$245,602
July 21, 2010^{[B]}	Paso Robles	United States	Chumash Grandstand Arena	14,162 / 14,162 (100%)	$312,960
July 24, 2010	Las Vegas	United States	Aladdin Theatre for the Performing Arts	6,808 / 6,808 (100%)	$238,836
July 25, 2010	Glendale	United States	Jobing.com Arena	13,818 / 13,818 (100%)	$256,446
July 28, 2010	Kansas City	United States	Sprint Center	14,481 / 14,481 (100%)	$307,701
July 29, 2010	North Little Rock	United States	Verizon Arena	13,676 / 15,800 (83%)	$214,854
July 31, 2010	Memphis	United States	FedExForum	13,750 / 14,750 (90%)	$407,795
August 1, 2010	Lafayette	United States	Cajundome	10,438 / 10,438 (100%)	$346,195
August 4, 2010	Orlando	United States	Amway Arena	12,225 / 12,225 (100%)	$235,713
August 5, 2010	Sunrise	United States	BankAtlantic Center	14,104 / 14,104 (100%)	$141,848
August 8, 2010	Charlotte	United States	Time Warner Cable Arena	15,263 / 15,263 (100%)	$256,795
August 9, 2010	Duluth	United States	The Arena at Gwinnett Center	10,588 / 10,588 (100%)	$313,420
August 11, 2010	Nashville	United States	Bridgestone Arena	14,345 / 14,345 (100%)	$394,350
August 12, 2010	Indianapolis	United States	Conseco Fieldhouse	14,490 / 14,490 (100%)	$239,505
August 14, 2010	Columbus	United States	Schottenstein Center	14,056 / 14,056 (100%)	$348,820
August 15, 2010	Auburn Hills	United States	The Palace of Auburn Hills	15,667 / 15,667 (100%)	$502,008
August 21, 2010	Toronto	Canada	Air Canada Centre	15,859 / 15,859 (100%)	$448,791
August 22, 2010	London	Canada	John Labatt Centre	9,154 / 9,154 (100%)	$237,765
August 24, 2010	Ottawa	Canada	Scotiabank Place	14,284 / 14,284 (100%)	$351,081
August 25, 2010	Albany	United States	Times Union Center	12,536 / 12,536 (100%)	$361,464
August 27, 2010	Providence	United States	Dunkin' Donuts Center	9,679 / 9,679 (100%)	$241,009
August 28, 2010	Newark	United States	Prudential Center	13,942 / 13,942 (100%)	$239,255
August 31, 2010	New York City	United States	Madison Square Garden	14,529 / 14,529 (100%)	$378,946
September 1, 2010^{[C]}	Syracuse	United States	New York State Fair Grandstand	16,787 / 16,787 (100%)	$537,275
September 3, 2010	Essex Junction	United States	Champlain Valley Expo	8,048 / 9,422 (85%)	$370,660
September 4, 2010^{[D]}	Allentown	United States	Allentown Fairgrounds	10,242 / 10,242 (100%)	$489,858
September 5, 2010^{[E]}	Timonium	United States	Timonium Race Track	12,540 / 12,540 (100%)	$295,650
September 14, 2010	Winnipeg	Canada	MTS Centre	12,422 / 12,422 (100%)	$436,175
September 16, 2010	Regina	Canada	Brandt Centre	6,747 / 6,747 (100%)	$348,641
September 17, 2010	Saskatoon	Canada	Credit Union Centre	13,059 / 13,059 (100%)	$349,066
September 19, 2010	Edmonton	Canada	Rexall Place	13,874 / 13,874 (100%)	$280,140
September 20, 2010	Calgary	Canada	Pengrowth Saddledome	13,893 / 13,893 (100%)	$508,161
October 8, 2010	Honolulu	United States	Blaisdell Arena	15,721 / 15,721 (100%)	$852,809
October 9, 2010	Honolulu	United States	Blaisdell Arena	15,721 / 15,721 (100%)	$852,809
October 19, 2010	Vancouver	Canada	Rogers Arena	14,899 / 14,899 (100%)	$269,285
October 22, 2010	Sacramento	United States	ARCO Arena	9,498 / 13,498 (70%)	$285,272
October 24, 2010	Ontario	United States	Citizens Business Bank Arena	8,482 / 8,482 (100%)	$193,283
October 25, 2010	Los Angeles	United States	Staples Center	13,572 / 13,572 (100%)	$535,512
October 27, 2010	Anaheim	United States	Honda Center	11,882 / 11,882 (100%)	$490,781
October 28, 2010	San Jose	United States	HP Pavilion	11,605 / 12,411 (94%)	$393,838
October 30, 2010	San Diego	United States	Valley View Casino Center	11,424 / 11,424 (100%)	$267,494
November 3, 2010	Oklahoma City	United States	Oklahoma City Arena	11,702 / 12,316 (95%)	$274,602
November 5, 2010	San Antonio	United States	AT&T Center	14,663 / 14,663 (100%)	$318,098
November 6, 2010	Houston	United States	Toyota Center	13,352 / 13,352 (100%)	$467,082
November 8, 2010	St. Louis	United States	Scottrade Center	14,471 / 14,471 (100%)	$207,896
November 10, 2010	Louisville	United States	KFC Yum! Center	15,943 / 15,943 (100%)	$374,638
November 11, 2010	Cleveland	United States	Wolstein Center	10,431 / 10,616 (98%)	$229,266
November 13, 2010	Norfolk	United States	Norfolk Scope	9,286 / 9,286 (100%)	$263,586
November 14, 2010	Philadelphia	United States	Wells Fargo Center	15,614 / 15,614 (100%)	$613,257
November 16, 2010	Boston	United States	TD Garden	14,080 / 14,080 (100%)	$543,180
November 17, 2010	East Rutherford	United States	Izod Center	16,394 / 16,394 (100%)	$657,502
November 20, 2010	Atlantic City	United States	Boardwalk Hall	13,481 / 13,481 (100%)	$503,831
November 22, 2010	Montreal	Canada	Bell Centre	16,260 / 16,260 (100%)	$412,580
November 23, 2010	Toronto	Canada	Air Canada Centre	16,639 / 16,639 (100%)	$377,432
December 9, 2010	Manchester	United States	Verizon Wireless Arena	9,300 / 9,300 (100%)	$432,290
December 13, 2010	Pittsburgh	United States	Consol Energy Center	13,957 / 13,957 (100%)	$804,568
December 15, 2010	Greensboro	United States	Greensboro Coliseum	14,603 / 14,603 (100%)	$700,618
December 16, 2010	Greenville	United States	BI-LO Center	11,769 / 11,769 (100%)	$577,074
December 18, 2010	Miami	United States	American Airlines Arena	14,167 / 14,167 (100%)	$693,312
December 19, 2010	Tampa	United States	St. Pete Times Forum	14,270 / 14,270 (100%)	$689,300
December 21, 2010	Birmingham	United States	BJCC Arena	13,773/ 13,773 (100%)	$667,628
December 23, 2010	Atlanta	United States	Philips Arena	14,045 / 14,045 (100%)	$823,881
Europe
March 4, 2011	Birmingham	England	National Indoor Arena	—N/a	—N/a
March 5, 2011	Birmingham	England	National Indoor Arena	—N/a	—N/a
March 8, 2011	Dublin	Ireland	The O_{2}	—N/a	—N/a
March 11, 2011	Liverpool	England	Echo Arena	—N/a	—N/a
March 12, 2011	Newcastle	England	Metro Radio Arena	—N/a	—N/a
March 14, 2011	London	England	The O_{2} Arena	16,020 / 16,020 (100%)	$881,519
March 21, 2011	Manchester	England	Manchester Evening News Arena	—N/a	—N/a
March 23, 2011	Sheffield	England	Motorpoint Arena	—N/a	—N/a
March 24, 2011	Nottingham	England	Trent FM Arena	—N/a	—N/a
March 26, 2011	Oberhausen	Germany	König Pilsener Arena	—N/a	—N/a
March 27, 2011	Rotterdam	Netherlands	Sportpaleis van Ahoy	—N/a	—N/a
March 29, 2011	Paris	France	Palais Omnisports de Paris-Bercy	—N/a	—N/a
March 30, 2011	Antwerp	Belgium	Sportpaleis	13,536 / 13,536 (100%)	$796,566
April 1, 2011	Herning	Denmark	Jyske Bank Boxen	—N/a	—N/a
April 2, 2011	Berlin	Germany	O_{2} World	—N/a	—N/a
April 5, 2011	Madrid	Spain	Palacio de Deportes	—N/a	—N/a
April 6, 2011	Barcelona	Spain	Palau Sant Jordi	—N/a	—N/a
April 8, 2011	Zürich	Switzerland	Hallenstadion	—N/a	—N/a
April 9, 2011	Milan	Italy	Mediolanum Forum	—N/a	—N/a
Asia
April 14, 2011	Tel Aviv	Israel	Yarkon Park	—N/a	—N/a
April 19, 2011	Kallang	Singapore	Singapore Indoor Stadium	—N/a	—N/a
April 21, 2011	Kuala Lumpur	Malaysia	Stadium Merdeka	—N/a	—N/a
April 23, 2011	Bogor	Indonesia	Sentul Auditorium	—N/a	—N/a
Oceania
April 26, 2011	Brisbane	Australia	Brisbane Entertainment Centre	11,065 / 11,065 (100%)	$651,750
April 28, 2011	Sydney	Australia	Acer Arena	29,481 / 29,481 (100%)	$692,460
April 29, 2011	Sydney	Australia	Acer Arena	29,481 / 29,481 (100%)	$692,460
May 2, 2011	Melbourne	Australia	Rod Laver Arena	25,538 / 25,538 (100%)	$807,360
May 3, 2011	Melbourne	Australia	Rod Laver Arena	25,538 / 25,538 (100%)	$807,360
May 5, 2011	Adelaide	Australia	Adelaide Entertainment Arena	8,510 / 8,510 (100%)	$914,907
May 7, 2011	Perth	Australia	Burswood Dome	7,162 / 7,162 (100%)	$1,680,197
Asia
May 10, 2011	Manila	Philippines	SM Mall of Asia Concert Grounds	—N/a	—N/a
May 13, 2011	Hong Kong		AsiaWorld–Arena	—N/a	—N/a
May 15, 2011	Taipei	Taiwan	Taipei Arena	—N/a	—N/a
May 18, 2011	Osaka	Japan	Zepp Osaka	—N/a	—N/a
May 19, 2011	Tokyo	Japan	Nippon Budokan	—N/a	—N/a
Latin America
September 30, 2011	Monterrey	Mexico	Arena Monterrey	—N/a	—N/a
October 1, 2011	Mexico City	Mexico	Foro Sol	94,449 / 106,028 (89%)	$6,027,190
October 2, 2011	Mexico City	Mexico	Foro Sol	94,449 / 106,028 (89%)	$6,027,190
October 5, 2011	Rio de Janeiro	Brazil	Estádio Olímpico João Havelange	46,533 / 57,189 (81%)	$518,920
October 6, 2011	Rio de Janeiro	Brazil	Estádio Olímpico João Havelange	46,533 / 57,189 (81%)	$518,920
October 8, 2011^{[F]}	São Paulo	Brazil	Estádio do Morumbi	71,683 / 78,910 (91%)	$237,520
October 9, 2011^{[G]}	São Paulo	Brazil	Estádio do Morumbi	71,683 / 78,910 (91%)	$237,520
October 10, 2011	Porto Alegre	Brazil	Estádio Beira-Rio	20,698 / 48,675 (43%)	$462,800
October 12, 2011	Buenos Aires	Argentina	Estadio River Plate	66,386 / 80,386 (82%)	$309,000
October 13, 2011	Buenos Aires	Argentina	Estadio River Plate	66,386 / 80,386 (82%)	$309,000
October 15, 2011	Santiago	Chile	Estadio Nacional de Chile	71,457 / 73,000 (90%)	$302,000
October 17, 2011	Lima	Peru	Estadio Nacional de Lima	18,923 / 33,769 (55%)	$216,450
October 19, 2011	Caracas	Venezuela	Estadio de Fútbol USB	13,039 / 15,591 (83%)	$287,670
TOTAL				798,690 / 818,197 (98%)	$53,341,886

Festivals and other miscellaneous performances

^{A} This concert was a part of "Summerfest"
^{B} This concert was a part of "California Mid-State Fair"
^{C} This concert was a part of "Great New York State Fair"
^{D} This concert was a part of "Great Allentown Fair"
^{E} This concert was a part of "Maryland State Fair"
^{F} This concert was a part of "Z Festival"
^{G} This concert was a part of "Festival Movistar"

== Recordings and broadcasting ==
All concerts were professionally filmed for venue projection because of the audience in back rows, but filmed with just one angle. The concert in New York City, United States on August 31, 2010 was filmed with different cameras and many angles for Bieber's 3D movie, Justin Bieber: Never Say Never.

The October 8, 2011 concert in São Paulo, Brazil was filmed with different cameras and angles professionally. Later, this concert was broadcast on television in Brazil but some songs are skipped.
