= Baby (Justin Bieber song) =

2010 song by Justin Bieber featuring Ludacris

- CD single cover art

Single by Justin Bieber featuring Ludacris

from the album My World 2.0
- Released: January 18, 2010
- Recorded: 2009
- Studio: Triangle Sound; The Ludaplex (Atlanta, Georgia)
- Genre: Teen pop
- Length: 3:34
- Label: Island; RBMG
- Songwriters: Justin Bieber; Christopher "Tricky" Stewart; Terius Nash; Christopher Bridges; Christina Milian
- Producers: Tricky Stewart; The-Dream

Justin Bieber singles chronology
"One Less Lonely Girl" (2009)	"Baby" (2010)	"Eenie Meenie" (2010)

Ludacris singles chronology
"How Low" (2010)	"Baby" (2010)	"All I Do Is Win" (2010)

Music video
- "Baby" on YouTube

"Baby" is a song by Canadian singer Justin Bieber featuring American rapper Ludacris. It was released as the lead single on Bieber's debut studio album, My World 2.0. The track was written by the artists alongside Christina Milian and producers Tricky Stewart and The-Dream.

It was available for digital download on January 18, 2010. The song received airplay directly after release, officially impacting mainstream and rhythmic radio on January 26, 2010. The song received positive reviews from critics, who complimented the song's effective lyrics and chorus and commended Ludacris' part and the song's ability to have an urban twist.

The song was a commercial success, peaking at number one in France and Scotland, and charting in the top ten of the United Kingdom, Canada, the United States, Australia, Norway, Japan, Ireland, Hungary, Belgium (Flanders), Slovakia, and New Zealand. "Baby" was the fourth most successful single of 2010 in France. The accompanying music video takes place in a mall/bowling-alley setting. The video features several cameos such as Drake, Lil Twist, and Tinashe, in which Bieber pursues a girl. As of May 2013, the song has sold 3.9 million digital downloads in the United States and is certified 12× platinum by the RIAA.

The official music video is the 39th most-viewed video on YouTube. As of January 2025, it is also the fourth-most-disliked video and the most-disliked music video on the platform. It had been the most-viewed YouTube video from July 16, 2010, when it surpassed the music video for "Bad Romance" by Lady Gaga, until November 24, 2012, when it was surpassed by the music video for "Gangnam Style" by Psy. Bieber performed the song several times, including on Saturday Night Live, and the ninth season of American Idol. Bieber also performed an acoustic rendition of the remix version with Drake at the 2010 Juno Awards. The official remix in the United Kingdom features British hip-hop artist Chipmunk.

== Background and writing ==
"Baby" was written by Bieber with Christopher "Tricky" Stewart (who worked on Bieber's debut single "One Time"), R&B singer The-Dream and his then-wife, Christina Milian, as well as Def Jam label-mate and the songs co-performer, Ludacris. When asked how the collaboration initially came about, Bieber said, "[Ludacris and I] both live in Atlanta. I met him a year prior to this and we figured it was a perfect collaboration for him, so we invited him out to do it." A few days before the release of the single, Bieber posted an acoustic version of the song to his YouTube with his guitarist Dan Kanter, similar to the way he did with "Favorite Girl". Billboard said that: "Bieber delivers his characteristically clean vocals with conviction: "My first love broke my heart for the first time / and I'm like, 'baby, baby, baby, no!' I thought you'd always be mine." Also in a review of the acoustic version Bill Lamb of About.com said that, "I think the vocals here will convince some that Justin Bieber really does have the vocal chops."

== Style and composition ==
"Baby"
A sample of "Baby" featuring Bieber singing the chorus and repetitive hook

The song is predominantly upbeat, featuring Bieber's R&B vocals over a backdrop containing a dance infused beat, full of keyboard and "disco string" synths. The song is played at a tempo of 130 BPM and is composed in the key of E♭ major with Bieber's vocal range spanning from the low-note of G_{3} to the high-note of C_{5}. According to Jody Rosen of Rolling Stone, the song "blends winks at Fifties doo-wop with hip-hop chants", comparing the style and the lyrics "My first love broke my heart for the first time/And I was like/Baby, baby, baby, oh/I thought you'd always be mine" to fifties ballads like "Tears on My Pillow", "Why Do Fools Fall in Love" and "Earth Angel". Lyrically, Bieber's lines explain his distress over his lost love, and promise to get it back, featured in lines like, "And I wanna play it cool/But I'm losin' you…/I'm in pieces/So come and fix me…". The chorus features the distinct and repetitive hook mainly consisting of the lines "[Like] baby, baby, baby, oh" and "Baby, baby, baby, no". After the second verse, Ludacris comes in with the verse-rap, an anecdote of young love when he was thirteen, as it runs "When I was 13/I had my first love/She had me going crazy/Oh, I was star-struck/She woke me up daily/Don't need no Starbucks…".

== Critical reception ==
Nick Levine of Digital Spy felt the song was "no great departure from what he's given us before", but felt the production of Tricky and The-Dream helped give the song a "simple", "big" chorus about "puppy love" that works. Melanie Bertoldi of Billboard said, "The midtempo number's undeniably contagious chorus should keep Bieber's tween fan base satisfied, and Ludacris' brief cameo adds a welcome urban twist." Bertoli went on to say, "The matchup adds a layer of maturity to Bieber's repertoire and should further solidify his growing presence on the charts." Rap-Up magazine said that "the sweet pop fare gets a little street cred courtesy of the teen sensation's labelmate Ludacris." Jody Rosen of Rolling Stone appreciated the song's vintage doo-wop and fifties aesthetic and hip-hop chants, and said the song included "one of the catchiest choruses concocted by the-Dream and Tricky Stewart, the duo behind "Umbrella" and "Single Ladies". Luke O'Neill of Boston Globe had mixed thoughts about the song calling Ludacris' cameo "goofy", and said, the song "effects a musical anachronism, albeit a catchy one, but in this sped-up recycling moment all styles all at once are grist for the mill."

== Chart performance ==
In the United States, "Baby" debuted at number five on the Billboard Hot 100, becoming Bieber's highest-charting single in the US. Bieber then went on to surpass this chart position when "Boyfriend" debuted at number two in April 2012. The song was also Ludacris's biggest song to date, solo or featuring, since 2007's "Glamorous". "Baby" was beaten out as the week's highest debut by Taylor Swift's "Today Was a Fairytale", which debuted at number two. The debuting of the pair of songs was just the third time in history that the Hot 100 had two new top-five debuts. The instance had last happened in 2003 when American Idol's Ruben Studdard and Clay Aiken's debut singles charted at number one and two.

During its first week of radio impact, the song had over 1400 spins, and was the top gainer for mainstream and rhythmic radio formats.

The song debuted at thirty-three on the Pop Songs chart on the week labeled February 13, 2010. The song missed out becoming the greatest gainer by one spot, which was Kesha's "Blah Blah Blah". However the following week, the song did collect greatest gainer recognition, jumping to twenty-five on the chart, and has since peaked at sixteen. On August 2, 2010, the song was certified double-platinum by the Recording Industry Association of America for shipments of 2,000,000 units.

As of May 2013, the song had sold 3.9 million digital downloads in the United States. With the inclusion of streaming in the RIAA certifications in 2013, the song became the highest certificated single of all time at 12× Platinum (surpassing "Candle in the Wind 1997" by Elton John at 11× Platinum).

"Baby" debuted and peaked on the Canadian Hot 100 at number three, becoming his highest-charting single at the time. On the issue dated February 8, 2010, the song debuted in Australia on the official ARIA Singles Chart at number thirty-seven. After twelve weeks of ascending and descending the charts the single reached a peak of three. "Baby" has since been certified platinum by the Australian Recording Industry Association (ARIA) for shipments of 70,000 units.

In New Zealand, the song entered the chart at nineteen. After weeks of ascending and descending the charts, "Baby" reached a peak of four. The song dropped to the number five position the following week and after weeks of fluctuating around the chart it attained the number four position once again. It has since been certified platinum by the Recording Industry Association of New Zealand (RIANZ).

The song peaked at number three on the UK Singles Chart on the issue date March 14, 2010. The following week, "Baby" fell to number four, but climbed back to its previous peak position of three on the issue date March 28, 2010. In the process of climbing the charts, "Baby" gained a new peak of two on the R&B Singles Chart.

By June 2012, "Baby" had sold 442,432 copies in the United Kingdom.

== Music video ==
Filming for the music video began during the week of January 25, 2010, in Los Angeles. It was filmed at Universal CityWalk and Lucky Strike Lanes, by director Ray Kay, who had previously directed videos for Beyoncé Knowles, Lady Gaga, Alexandra Burke, and Cheryl Cole, among others. Ludacris said that the video "is like a 2010 version of Michael Jackson's 'The Way You Make Me Feel'." Bieber said that the video "will capture the song's message of trying to woo back a girl." In explaining the concept of the video, Bieber said, "It starts off, I really like this girl, but we didn't [get] along; we couldn't be together. Basically I want her back and [I'm] kind of going through the whole thing. I'm chasing her around, trying to get her, and she's kind of playing hard to get, but I'm persistent. I keep going." The video premiered exclusively on Vevo on Friday, February 19, 2010. Singer and actress Jasmine Villegas portrays Bieber's love interest in the video. Bieber's friends, Young Money artists Drake and Lil Twist also appeared in the video, along with Tinashe and jerkin' crew The Rangers.

The video takes place in a mall-like setting with a bowling alley and more. After the video was released, MTV commented on the video being the new version of "The Way You Make Me Feel" saying, "... and the choreography does use a few of Jackson's less-suggestive moves." The MTV review goes on to say, "most of the video takes place in the bowling alley, there are also scenes of Bieber in other settings, hanging out with Luda, doing the moonwalk, messing with his hair and mugging for the camera. During the video Bieber's friends and Villegas's friends have several dance offs and Villegas eventually smiles at him. Regardless of his crush's apparent frustration with him, Bieber eventually wins her over. The video concludes with the pair walking off into the night holding hands."

Billboard reviewed the video, saying, "Those new dance moves he's showing off can only mean one thing: all over the world, tweens' hearts are melting right now." In July 2010, the video became the most viewed video in YouTube history until it was surpassed by Psy's hit single, "Gangnam Style", in November 2012.

The video received 7.7 million views within its first seven days.

As of January 2026, the video has received over 3.5 billion views on the video-sharing website YouTube. It was also the most disliked video of all time (briefly surpassed by "Friday" by Rebecca Black upon that video's release in 2011). The "Baby" music video held the record for the most disliked video for over 7 years, until it was surpassed in December 2018 by YouTube Rewind 2018: Everyone Controls Rewind (the current most disliked video). The video currently sits as the fourth most disliked YouTube video.

== Live performances ==
Bieber first premiered the song performing on the MuchMusic series Live at Much on December 28, 2009. He sang the song on VH1's Pepsi Super Bowl Fan Jam, along with other performers Rihanna, JoJo and Timbaland, and on CBS' The Early Show as a part of their Super Bowl programming. He performed the song the first time with Ludacris on BET's SOS: Saving Ourselves – Help for Haiti Telethon, on February 6, 2010, which also aired on VH1, and MTV. During the chorus, he changed the lyrics to "Baby, baby, Haiti", to show support for the cause, and the reason everyone came together for the show. In the week of his album release, he performed the song on The View and 106 & Park. Bieber also performed the song at the 2010 Kids Choice Awards on March 27. Bieber performed the song along with "U Smile" on the eighteenth episode of season thirty five of Saturday Night Live. Bieber performed an acoustic rendition of the song along with a freestyle by good friend Drake at the 2010 Juno Awards. In April 2010, Bieber noted that due to his voice changing, he could no longer hit all the notes in "Baby", and for live performances, the key is lowered. Bieber performed the song live in Sydney, Australia, on April 26, 2010, in the Sunrise studios after his public performance was cancelled. Bieber also performed the song on May 11, 2010, on The Oprah Winfrey Show. Bieber performed the song on June 4, 2010, on the Today Show along with "Never Say Never", "Somebody to Love", and "One Time". He performed the song with "Somebody to Love" at the 2010 MuchMusic Video Awards.

== Cover versions and samples ==
Jazz pianist Jacky Terrasson covered "Baby" with his trio on his 2012 album Gouache.

The song was also covered by Relient K in 2011 for their cover album Is for Karaoke. It was also covered by "Weird Al" Yankovic in the polka medley "Polka Face" in the same year for his 2011 album Alpocalypse.

It was sampled 40 times. In 2012, Alexa Ilacad, Mika Dela Cruz, Noemi Oineza and Angel Sy, AKA T.O.P., sampled this song for their single "Crush".

== Parody versions ==
Yes We Canberra released a parody version satirising then Opposition leader Tony Abbott during the lead-up to the 2010 Australian federal election.

In the 2012 film Diary of a Wimpy Kid: Dog Days, main character Greg Heffley's older brother Rodrick (portrayed by Devon Bostick) performs a hard rock cover of the song with his band, Löded Diper, in an attempt to impress his love interest Heather Hills (older sister of Greg's love interest, Holly) during her sweet sixteen party. His performance causes the event to end in disaster.

In the Annoying Orange episode "OMG" (parody of TMZ), there is a clip of Justin Bieberry (portrayal of Bieber) singing a parody version called "Gravy".

== Track listing ==
US digital download
No.	Title	Length
1.	"Baby" (featuring Ludacris)	3:34

Australia digital download
No.	Title	Length
1.	"Baby" (featuring Ludacris)	3:36
2.	"Baby" (music video)	3:39

UK Chipmunk Remix
No.	Title	Length
1.	"Baby" (Chipmunk Remix) (featuring Chipmunk)	3:41

== Charts ==
=== Weekly charts ===
Chart (2010–2011)	Peak position
Australia (ARIA)	3
Austria (Ö3 Austria Top 40)	27
Belgium (Ultratop 50 Flanders)	12
Belgium (Ultratop 50 Wallonia)	13
Brazil (Crowley Broadcast Analysis)	4
Canada Hot 100 (Billboard)	3
Canada CHR/Top 40 (Billboard)	20
Czech Republic Airplay (ČNS IFPI)	20
Denmark (Tracklisten)	13
European Hot 100 Singles (Billboard)	2
France (SNEP)	1
Germany (GfK)	22
Hungary (Single Top 40)	9
Ireland (IRMA)	7
Israel International Airplay (Media Forest)	5
Japan (Japan Hot 100)	2
Mexico Airplay (Billboard)	18
Netherlands (Dutch Top 40)	23
Netherlands (Single Top 100)	23
New Zealand (Recorded Music NZ)	4
Norway (VG-lista)	3
Scottish Singles Sales (Official Charts)	1
Slovakia Airplay (ČNS IFPI)	10
Spain (Promusicae)	34
Sweden (Sverigetopplistan)	25
Switzerland (Schweizer Hitparade)	25
UK Singles (Official Charts)	3
UK Hip Hop/R&B (Official Charts)	2
US Billboard Hot 100	5
US Dance Airplay (Billboard)	24
US Hot R&B/Hip-Hop Songs (Billboard)	96
US Latin Pop Airplay (Billboard)	31
US Pop Airplay (Billboard)	16
US Rhythmic Airplay (Billboard)	11

Chart (2026)	Peak position
Austria (Ö3 Austria Top 40)	23
Czech Republic Singles Digital (ČNS IFPI)	72
France (SNEP)	77
Global 200 (Billboard)	8
Greece International (IFPI)	5
Hong Kong (Billboard)	16
Indonesia (Billboard)	20
Israel (Mako Hitlist)	99
Italy (FIMI)	42
Japan Hot Overseas (Billboard Japan)	5
Lithuania (AGATA)	93
Malaysia (IFPI)	8
Malaysia International (RIM)	5
Middle East and North Africa (IFPI)	11
Panama Streaming (PRODUCE)	86
Philippines Hot 100 (Billboard Philippines)	19
Poland (Polish Streaming Top 100)	86
Portugal (AFP)	38
Singapore (RIAS)	10
Slovakia Singles Digital (ČNS IFPI)	47
Spain (Promusicae)	42
Switzerland (Schweizer Hitparade)	22
Taiwan (Billboard)	6
UK Singles (Official Charts)	17
United Arab Emirates (IFPI)	10
Vietnam (IFPI)	11
Vietnam Hot 100 (Billboard)	9

=== Monthly charts ===
Chart (2010)	Position
Brazil (Brasil Hot 100 Airplay)	2
Brazil (Brasil Hot Pop Songs)	1

=== Year-end charts ===
Chart (2010)	Position
Australia (ARIA)	35
Belgium (Ultratop Flanders)	56
Belgium (Ultratop Wallonia)	48
Canada (Canadian Hot 100)	61
France (SNEP)	4
Japan (Japan Hot 100)	18
Japan Adult Contemporary (Billboard Japan)	8
New Zealand (Recorded Music NZ)	21
Taiwan (Hito Radio)	3
UK Singles (Official Charts Company)	47
US Billboard Hot 100	44

== Certifications ==
Region	Certification	Certified units/sales
Australia (ARIA)	8× Platinum	560,000^{‡}
Belgium (BRMA)	Gold	15,000^{*}
Brazil (Pro-Música Brasil)	4× Diamond	1,000,000^{‡}
Canada (Music Canada)	2× Platinum	160,000^{*}
Denmark (IFPI Danmark)	2× Platinum	180,000^{‡}
Germany (BVMI)	Gold	150,000^{‡}
Italy (FIMI)	Gold	35,000^{‡}
Japan (RIAJ) PC download	Gold	100,000^{*}
Japan (RIAJ) Full-length ringtone	Gold	100,000^{*}
New Zealand (RMNZ)	4× Platinum	120,000^{‡}
Norway (IFPI Norway)	3× Platinum	30,000^{*}
Spain (Promusicae)	Platinum	60,000^{‡}
United Kingdom (BPI)	3× Platinum	1,800,000^{‡}
United States (RIAA)	12× Platinum	12,000,000^{‡}
Streaming
Denmark (IFPI Danmark)	Gold	900,000^{†}
Greece (IFPI Greece)	Gold	1,000,000^{†}
Japan (RIAJ)	Gold	50,000,000^{†}
^{*} Sales figures based on certification alone.^{‡} Sales+streaming figures based on certification alone.^{†} Streaming-only figures based on certification alone.

== Release history ==
Region	Date	Format
United States	January 18, 2010	Digital download
United States	January 26, 2010	Mainstream radio
Australia	January 29, 2010	Digital download
Germany	February 22, 2010	Digital download
Germany	March 5, 2010	CD single
France	February 22, 2010	CD single
United Kingdom	March 7, 2010	Digital download

== See also ==
- List of most-viewed YouTube videos
- List of most-disliked YouTube videos
