= Ezekiel Lewis =

American songwriter and producer

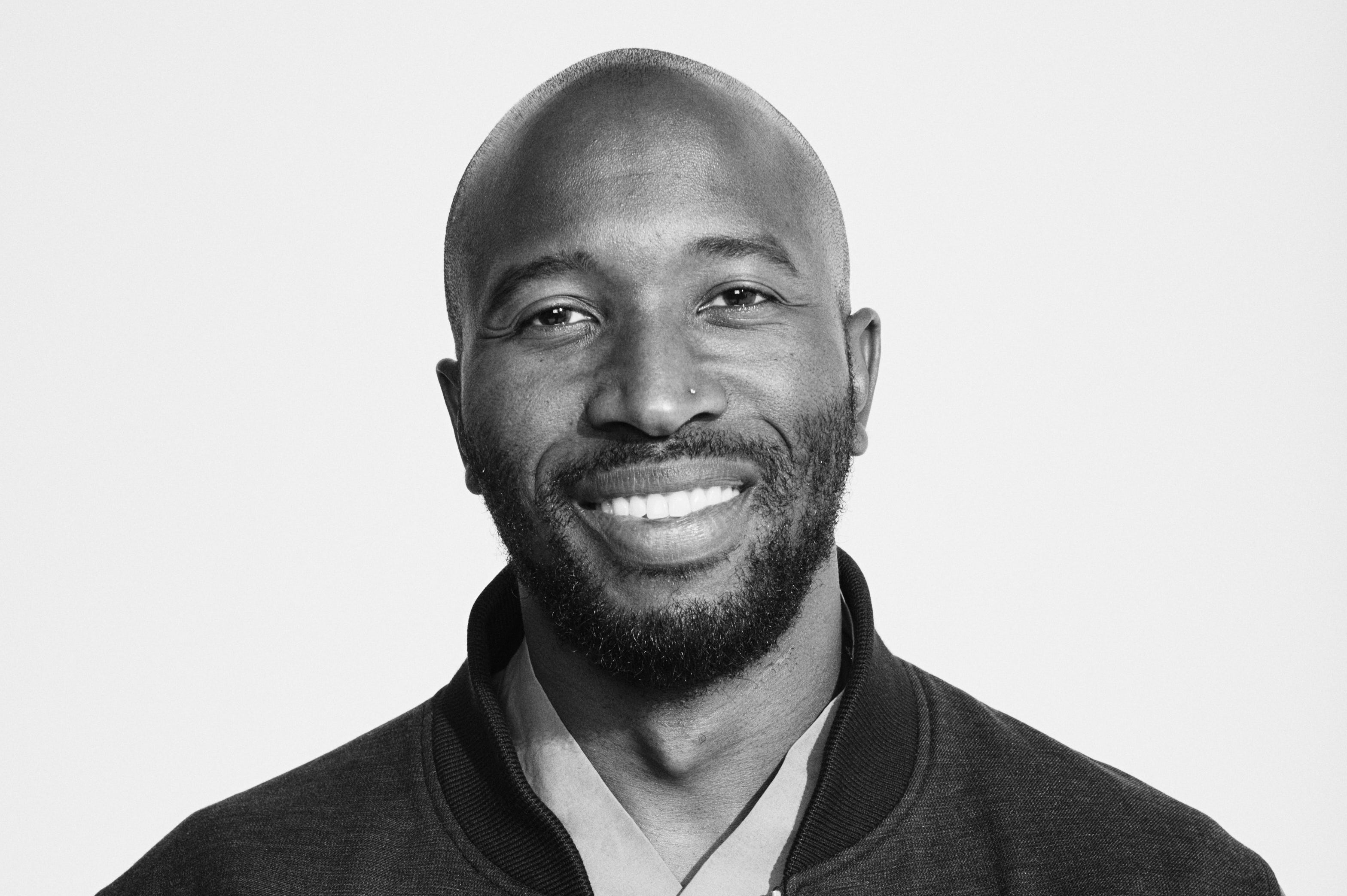
- Born: Montgomery, Alabama, U.S.
- Education: Morehouse College
- Occupations: Record executive, songwriter
- Employer: Epic Records

Ezekiel Lewis is an American record executive who has been the CEO of Epic Records since March 2026. Prior, he served as Senior VP of A&R at Motown from 2011 to 2017, and held a similar title at Epic from the latter year to 2023. He is also the founder of the music publishing company Bar Music Group, as well as the production collective the Clutch.

== Early life and education ==
Lewis grew up in Montgomery, Alabama. Lewis graduated from Morehouse College.

== Career ==
Lewis signed with David Foster’s 143 Records as a musician after graduating from college. He served as a composer for Luther Vandross’s Grammy-winning album Dance with My Father, which was released in 2003.

In 2004, Lewis co-founded songwriting and production collective The Clutch, crafting songs for artists such as Mary J. Blige, Britney Spears, Justin Bieber, Omarion, Fantasia, Jennifer Lopez, Ciara, and Timbaland. Notable credits from this period include Mary J. Blige’s Grammy-winning 2005 classic The Breakthrough,. "Freakshow" and “Radar” from Britney Spears' 2007 opus Blackout, and Justin Bieber's 2009 triple-platinum hit “One Less Lonely Girl.”

He worked closely with R&B singer Trey Songz, contributing to his first album I Gotta Make It in 2005.

Lewis founded the music publishing company Bar Music Group in 2010.

The company represents a number of artists, songwriters and producers including John “SK” McGee (Future, Trey Songz, Pusha T, Kevin Gates) and Najja McDowell (Trey Songz’ “2 Reasons” featuring T.I., “Simply Amazing” and “Dive In”). He started to climb the label ranks in 2011, when he was named Senior Vice President of A&R at Motown Records in 2011. While at Motown Records, he worked on music by artists such as Ne-Yo, Lil Yachty, and T.I.

With a knack for sniffing out hits and lifting great artists to new heights, in 2017, Lewis was appointed Executive Vice President of A&R at Epic Records. In this capacity, he worked on music with artists such as 21 Savage, the Black Eyed Peas, Future, and Meghan Trainor. He also contributed to Mariah Carey’s 2018 album Caution. He did production work on Kevin Hart’s Grammy-nominated 2018 comedy album What Now?

Lewis also spearheaded major comebacks for the Black Eyed Peas and Meghan Trainor. The exec helped guide Black Eyed Peas on their 2020 album Translation, which included the smash hits “Ritmo (Bad Boys for Life)” and “Mamacita.” which were included in Billboard’s Hot Latin Songs chart.

Additionally, he shaped Meghan Trainor’s 2022 album Takin’ It Back, which produced the viral smash "Made You Look." During this period, he also A&R'd Giveon’s 2022 album Give or Take.

In 2023, Lewis was appointed President of Epic Records, shepherding the likes of rising pop stars Madison Beer and Zara Larsson to massive success. He was also named to Billboard’s Power 100 List and was honored at the Creative Community for Peace’s fifth annual Ambassadors for Peace event. The accolades continued in 2024, Lewis being named Billboard Executive of the Week for his work on Tyla’s song “Water.”

In March 2026, he was promoted to be the CEO of Epic Records.

== Select Discography ==
Year	Artist	Work	Credits
2001	Ezekiel Lewis	Rider like me - on Osmosis Jones Soundtrack	Singer
2003	Luther Vandross	Dance With My Father	Composer
2005	Trey Songz	I Gotta Make It	Composer
2005	Mary J. Blige	Take Me As I Am	Composer
2006	Jagged Edge	Jagged Edge	Composer
2006	The Isley Brothers / Ronald Isley	Baby Makin' Music	Producer, Vocal (Background), Voice Arrangement, Vocal Producer, Composer
2006	Omarion	21	Composer
2007	Kevin Michael	Kevin Michael	Composer
2007	Mario	Go	Composer
2007	Omarion	Ice Box	Composer
2007	Britney Spears	Freakshow	Co-writer
2007	Britney Spears	Radar	Co-writer
2007	Keke Palmer	So Uncool	Composer
2008	Amerie	Because I love You	Composer
2008	Danity Kane	Anonymous Hit Pack	Composer
2008	Danity Kane	Welcome to the Dollhouse	Composer
2008	Donnie Klang	Just A Rolling Stone	Composer
2008	The Pussy Cat Dolls	Doll Domination	Composer
2008	Tiffany Evans	Tiffany Evans	Composer
2008	Britney Spears	Circus	Composer
2008	Jesse McCartney	Departure	Drum Programming, Vocals (Background), Songwriter, Composer
2009	Ginuwine	A Man'sThoughts	Vocal Producer
2009	Keril Hilson	In a Perfect World	Composer
2009	Justin Bieber	My World	Composer, Producer
2009	Chris Cornell	Part of Me	Composer
2009	Various Artists	Punk Goes Pop, Vol. 2	Composer
2009	Chris Cornell	Scream	Vocals (Background), Composer
2009	Noel Gourdin	After My Time	Composer
2009	Britney Spears	Circus	Composer
2009	Justin Bieber	One Less Lonely Girl	Composer
2010	Justin Bieber	My Worlds Acoustic	Composer
2010	Justin Bieber	My Worlds	Composer
2010	Trey Songz	Passion, Pain & Pleasure	Composer
2010	Piano Tribute Players	Piano Tribute to Justin Bieber	Composer
2010	Jaheim	Another Round	Composer
2010	Ronald Isley	Mr. I	Composer
2011	Britney Spears	B in the Mix: The Remixes, Vol. 2	Composer
2011	Justin Bieber	Chartbuster Karaoke Gold : Justin Bieber	Composer
2011	Various Artists	Clubbers Guide 2011	Vocal Producer
2011	Various Artists	Ibiza Annual 2011	Vocal Producer
2012	Trey Songz	Chapter V	Composer
2012	The OMG Girlz	Where the boys At	Composer
2012	Britney Spears	Femme Fatale/Circus	Composer
2013	Britney Spears	In the Zone/Circus	Composer
2013	Tyler Perry's A Madea Christmas Album	The Florida Files	A & R composer, Producer
2013	B. Smith	The Florida Files	Composer
2014	Trey Songz	Trigga	Composer
2015	Kevin Ross	Dream	Composer
2016	Kevin Ross	Push It On Me	Composer
2017	Kevin Ross	Look Up	Composer
2018	Chris Cornell	Chris Cornell	Composer, Backing Vocals
2020	Black Eyed Peas	Translations	Composer
