= One Less Lonely Girl =

Single by Justin Bieber

from the EP My World
- Released: October 6, 2009
- Recorded: 2009
- Studio: Mogul Music Studios (Atlanta, Georgia)
- Genre: Pop; R&B
- Length: 3:48
- Label: Island; RBMG
- Songwriters: Ezekiel Lewis; Balewa Muhammad; Sean Hamilton; Hyuk Shin; Johnnie Harris IV
- Producers: Ezekiel Lewis; Balewa Muhammad; Sean Hamilton; Hyuk Shin

Justin Bieber singles chronology
"One Time" (2009)	"One Less Lonely Girl" (2009)	"Baby" (2010)

Music video
- "One Less Lonely Girl" on YouTube

"One Less Lonely Girl" is a song by Canadian singer Justin Bieber. It was written and produced by Ezekiel Lewis and Balewa Muhammad of The Clutch, and Sean Hamilton, John "J.R." Harris and Hyuk Shin of the production team A-Rex. The song was released exclusively to iTunes as the second single from his debut release, My World, on October 6, 2009, and was later released to more digital distributions and mainstream and rhythmic radio soon after.

The song's accompanying music video was published on YouTube on November 30, 2009; both of which saw positive reception, with critics commending the song's delivery and comparing it to pop-R&B songs by Chris Brown. It was a success in the United States and Canada, Bieber's highest peaks in the countries at sixteen and ten, respectively until "Baby" bested both in 2010. It also charted in the Belgium (Flanders) tip chart and in Germany within the top thirty, and also charted in Austria, Australia, and United Kingdom. The music video features Bieber attracted to a girl he sees in the laundromat, as he leads her on a scavenger hunt to win a date with her. Bieber has performed the song in a number of live appearances including the Fearless Tour, The Next Star, and Dick Clark's New Year's Rockin' Eve with Ryan Seacrest.

== Background and release ==
Regarding the concept of the song, Bieber told MTV News, "I think it's really important these girls have something so they can be one less lonely girl." Bieber joked that "Lonely Girl" wasn't always the choice for his second single stating "It was either between that or 'I Love High School.'", a remix of "I Love College" by label mate, Asher Roth. "One Less Lonely Girl" was released digitally on the iTunes Store on October 6, 2009.

== Composition and critical reception ==
"One Less Lonely Girl"
Bieber's "One Less Lonely Girl" is a mid-tempo R&B/Pop song compared to the work of Chris Brown

Crystal Bell of Billboard gave the song a generally positive review stating "much as he did on his debut single, "One Time," Bieber makes a strong case for why he's the next pop heartthrob. 'I'm gonna put you first, I'll show you what you're worth/If you let me inside your world,' he sings. The stump speech is hard to resist, especially when set to an arrangement that follows the lineage of hit midtempo ballads "With You", and "Irreplaceable". Although the lyrics are generic, Bieber's smooth delivery is right on point, and his tender vocals blend well with the song's easy-flowing beat." Jon Caramanica of The New York Times called the song along with "Down to Earth", "uncomplicatedly beautiful and earnest." Andy Kellman of Allmusic listed the song as one of his recommended tracks from the album.

== Chart performance ==
In the U.S., the single had 113,000 downloads in its first week, propelling it to debut at number sixteen on the Billboard Hot 100 on the issue dated October 24, 2009. Bieber scored the second highest debut of the week, only being surpassed by "3" by Britney Spears. Due to the impact of mainstream radio in the U.S., the song entered at thirty-six on the Billboard Pop Songs on the week ending December 12, 2009, and in turn also re-entered the Hot 100 at sixty-nine. It dropped the next week on the Hot 100, but rose to thirty-two on the Pop Songs, and rose again to twenty-six the following week. The single peaked at twenty-one on the pop chart. Due to increased airplay and digital sales of My World, on the week ending January 9, 2010, the song rose thirty positions from sixty to thirty on the Hot 100. As of February 2011, the single has sold over 1,025,000 digital copies in the United States. The song debuted at number ten on the Canadian Hot 100 on the issue dated October 24, 2009.

It debuted in Austria at number fifty-four, where it peaked, and remained four weeks on the chart. It debuted on the Belgian Tip Chart in Flanders at number twenty-five, where it peaked, and remained for two weeks. It debuted in Germany at number twenty-two, where it peaked, and remained for nine weeks. The song also peaked at sixty-eight in Australia and sixty-two in the United Kingdom.

== Music video ==
Bieber wearing the green sweatshirt and posting signs for his scavenger hunt in the "One Less Lonely Girl" video

In an October 7, 2009, exclusive with MTV News, Bieber confirmed that a music video had been shot in Watertown, Tennessee (a small town approximately 50 miles east of Nashville, Tennessee) with Roman White who directed the music video for "You Belong With Me" by Taylor Swift. The video premiered on perezhilton.com on October 9, 2009, and was released to iTunes three days later. It later premiered on Bieber's official site and YouTube on October 13, 2009, Bieber's mother, Pattie Mallette, makes a cameo during the flower stand scene in the music video. While filming the music video, Bieber joked and said, "It’s like the biggest town I’ve ever been in." He went on to say, ""It’s really small and quaint and cute and cool. Everyone probably knows everyone I guess." Promotional photography took place around the town a few days before the rest of the video shoot, including Bieber holding posters of his first shoot, and with an old turquoise truck. The video was the first to feature Bieber wearing his signature dog tag. In a behind-the-scenes feature, Bieber said that a fan gave it to him, and it belonged to one of their friends that died in the war. Bieber stated, "I wear it because its cool and kind of a memory." The basic concept of the video is Bieber's goal to win a girl's heart after leading her around the town. Director Roman White said, "It’s romantic, it’s in a laundromat...that’s all it takes to win a girl is strung lights".

In the music video, Bieber is attracted to a girl (Grace Marie Wilson) he sees every day washing clothes at the local laundromat. In the opening scenes, Bieber is wearing a green hooded sweatshirt, similar to the gray one he wore in the "One Time" video, along with a cranberry shirt. One day while he is waiting for his clothes and is tuning his guitar, she drops a scarf, and he picks it up. In the laundromat scene Bieber is wearing a mixed purple, blue & orange plaid collared shirt, with a dark purple tee. The girl comes back the next day however he is not there. He then posts a sign beside the washer that he found her missing scarf. He leads the girl on a scavenger hunt for the scarf, posting signs with pictures of him on them around the town to encourage her to go on a date with him. He takes pictures of him in situations such as buying chocolate for her and the puppies scene, and others, with notes doting quips of what he would do for her. During the date and ending scenes Bieber has on a white striped collared shirt, with a dark cyan tee. She finally finds him at the end of the video, and they have their date.

MTV called the video "lost-and-found action with a scarf that eventually leads to some young love," and gives credit to Bieber as a new sensation, stating "The setting for "One Less Lonely Girl" seems to be Main Street, USA...And why not? Is this kid not the slice of apple pie cooling on the window sill of the American teen dream?" AOL calls the video a "treasure hunt" and commended the pet store scene, saying "And then, as if the video couldn't get more cute, they bring out the puppies." "One Less Lonely Girl" officially published on YouTube on May 31, 2013.

== Merchandise ==
The "One Less Lonely Girl" phrase spawned several products from Bieber's official store to have the coined phrase on them. One of the products is a cranberry colored scarf, the same color as a shirt Bieber wore in the music video. One end of the scarf has a patch with the "One Less Lonely Girl" phrase on it and the other end has a signature by Bieber. Tamar Antai of MTV Buzzworthy called the scarf "boundsly adorable" and "a total bargain for less loneliness". Another product was a white t-shirt that had the phrase stylized as "1LessL♥nelyGirl" in variations of sky blue colors. In December 2009, Bieber teamed up with 1-800-Flowers for a promotion. The company came out with a "One Less Lonely Girl"-branded bouquet of red "intuition" roses and a Valentine's Day card from Bieber, depicting the singer holding a heart. Packages could either have a twenty-four or twelve count stems, and a red, silver or clear vase. The flowers could be set for delivery between January 12-February 12, 2010, before Valentine's Day. The first one thousand customers received a free replica of the scarf in the "One Less Lonely Girl" video. A portion of the proceeds went to Pencils of Promise, a charity that helps build schools in developing areas of the world. Bieber frequently participates in the charity. A contest was also set in place in which a winner would be greeted with their flowers by Bieber himself, or could win the flower bouquet and other Justin Bieber merchandise.

== Live performances ==
Bieber has performed "One Less Lonely Girl" as an acoustic rendition and with the original musical background. He premiered the song, performing an acoustic rendition when he made a return appearance to his native Canada on the finale of YTV's The Next Star. Bieber performed the song along with his lead single "One Time" on September 26, 2009. He also performed the song acoustically when he appeared on It's On with Alexa Chung on November 19, 2009. When Bieber performs the song with the musical background, he invites one girl on stage to be the object of his affection or the "lonely girl" during the performance and gives them flowers. (The "lonely girl" traditionally does not appear on stage until the song's bridge.) Bieber performed the song with the original musical background along with "One Time", and "Favorite Girl" on his U.S. network television debut on The Today Show. He also performed the song with the musical background on The Ellen DeGeneres Show, and during Winter 2009 when he performed at several different Jingle Ball concerts. When Bieber performed at Q100's Jingle Ball in Atlanta, Georgia, where Bieber's career is based out of, he invited good friend and former girlfriend, Caitlin Beadles, who had recently recovered from a boating accident, on stage as the girl during the song. Bieber performed the single as his second song during Dick Clark's New Year's Rockin' Eve with Ryan Seacrest, and invited his friend and fellow performer that night, Selena Gomez on stage to act as the lonely girl. The performance onstage fueled further speculation of a relationship between Bieber and Gomez but both claimed they were just friends, as they did before. He sang the song on VH1's Pepsi Super Bowl Fan Jam, along with other performers Rihanna and Timbaland, and on CBS' The Early Show as a part of their Super Bowl programming. He performed a medley of "One Less Lonely Girl" and "Never Let You Go", along with "Baby" at BET's SOS: Help for Haiti Telethon. With the telethon also being broadcast in Haiti, Bieber sang the first verse in French. The song was also on the set list for the My World Tour and the Believe Tour. When Bieber performed the song as part of the Believe Tour, instead of giving the "lonely girl" flowers, he placed a wreath of flowers on her head. During the Purpose World Tour, Bieber unexpectedly performed the song during the tour for the last time.

== Controversy ==
A parody of the song performed by Bieber caused controversy after a video of it was released by the entertainment news website TMZ on June 4, 2014. The video featured a then 15-year-old Bieber, parodying the song with the main lyric "One less lonely nigger," and singing that if he were to kill "one less lonely nigger," he'd be "part of the KKK." Sources stated that Bieber told his mentors, musicians Usher and Will Smith, about the video after it was filmed, after which Usher showed Bieber some videos about the history of racism in an effort to teach him about the derogatory intent of the word "nigger" and other racial epithets. On June 5, 2014, the rapper and president of Young Money Entertainment, Mack Maine chose to defend Bieber after the racist remarks. Maine said Bieber is still family for the artists on Young Money, according to TMZ. The publication reports that Maine says Bieber has black friends and that "Bieber does not have a slave mentality." According to Mack Maine, Bieber "treats his people with respect." Mack Maine has said that he brought up a racial joke in his past. "I remember telling a White man, Chinese man, Black man joke as a kid that was terrible," Maine says, "and I told it to my friends because I thought they'd think it was funny." Mack Maine also confirms that Young Money and Justin Bieber are slated to continue working together. On the same day, Bieber apologized for the parody, saying "I didn’t realize at the time that it wasn’t funny and that in fact my actions were continuing the ignorance" and "I take all my friendships with people of all cultures very seriously and I apologize for offending or hurting anyone with my childish and inexcusable behavior."

== Credits and personnel ==
- Songwriting - Vance Tate, Thomas Olivera, Ezekiel Lewis, Balewa Muhammad, Sean Hamilton, Hyuk Shin (Joombas)
- Production - Ezekiel Lewis, Balewa Muhammad, Sean Hamilton, Hyuk Shin (Joombas), Vance Tate, Thomas Olivera
- Vocal production and recording - Ezekiel Lewis and Dave Hyman
- Mixing - Jaycen Joshua-Fowler and Dave Pensado, assisted by Giancarlo Lino
- A&R Consultants - Vance Tate, Steve Owens and Rosalind Harrell

== Charts ==
Chart performance for "One Less Lonely Girl"
Chart (2009–2010)	Peak position
Australia (ARIA)	68
Austria (Ö3 Austria Top 40)	54
Belgium (Ultratip Bubbling Under Flanders)	25
Canada Hot 100 (Billboard)	10
Canada CHR/Top 40 (Billboard)	39
Germany (GfK)	22
Scotland Singles (Official Charts)	56
UK Singles (Official Charts)	62
US Billboard Hot 100	16
US Pop Airplay (Billboard)	21

Chart performance for "One Less Lonely Girl"
Chart (2026)	Peak position
Global 200 (Billboard)	75
Malaysia (Billboard)	20
Malaysia International (RIM)	16
Netherlands (Single Tip)	7
Philippines (IFPI)	9
Philippines Hot 100 (Billboard Philippines)	11
Sweden Heatseeker (Sverigetopplistan)	12

== Certifications ==
Certifications for "One Less Lonely Girl"
Region	Certification	Certified units/sales
Australia (ARIA)	Platinum	70,000^{‡}
Brazil (Pro-Música Brasil)	Platinum	60,000^{‡}
Canada (Music Canada)	Gold	40,000^{*}
Denmark (IFPI Danmark)	Gold	45,000^{‡}
New Zealand (RMNZ)	Platinum	30,000^{‡}
United Kingdom (BPI)	Silver	200,000^{‡}
United States (RIAA)	3× Platinum	3,000,000^{‡}
^{*} Sales figures based on certification alone.^{‡} Sales+streaming figures based on certification alone.

== Release history ==
Release dates and formats for "One Less Lonely Girl"
Region	Date	Format
Canada	October 6, 2009	Digital download
United States	October 6, 2009	Digital download
United States	November 30, 2009	Mainstream airplay
United States	December 15, 2009	Rhythmic airplay
