= My World (Justin Bieber EP) =

EP by Justin Bieber
- Released: November 17, 2009
- Genres: Teen pop; dance-pop
- Length: 25:58
- Labels: Island; Teen Island; RBMG; Schoolboy
- Producers: Tricky Stewart; Ezekiel Lewis; Balewa Muhammad; D'Mile; Dirty Swift; Bruce Waynne; Dapo Torimiro; Sean P. Hamilton; Hyuk Shin; Pretty Boi Fresh; DJ Frank E; JB & Corron; Lashaunda "Babygirl" Carr

Justin Bieber chronology
My World (2009)	My World 2.0 (2010)

Singles from My World
- 1. "One Time" Released: May 18, 2009; 2. "One Less Lonely Girl" Released: October 6, 2009

My World is the debut extended play (EP) by the Canadian singer Justin Bieber. It was released on November 17, 2009, by Island, RBMG and Schoolboy Records. It is considered the first half of a two-piece project, later being supplemented by Bieber's debut studio album My World 2.0 (2010). After signing a recording contract in light of his growing popularity on YouTube, Bieber worked with various collaborators, including his mentor Usher and producers Tricky Stewart, D'Mile, and MIDI Mafia. The EP's music incorporates pop and dance-pop styles with R&B influences, and lyrically discusses teen romance and coming of age situations.

Upon its release, My World received generally favorable reviews from music critics, who complimented its production and noted that material from the EP was inspired by singer Chris Brown's early work. It debuted at number six on the US Billboard 200 albums chart with first-week sales of 137,000 copies. In doing so, it became the strongest-debuting release for a new artist in the United States in 2009, though it was topped the following week by I Dreamed a Dream by Susan Boyle, which moved 701,000 units in its debut week. Upon the release of My World 2.0 in March 2010, My World reached a new peak of number five on the Billboard 200. The extended play attained international success. It debuted atop the Canadian Albums Chart, where it was later certified double Platinum. It additionally attained double Platinum recognition in the United Kingdom.

Two singles were released from My World, both of which became international successes. The lead single, "One Time", reached the top twenty in five countries' singles charts, while its follow-up, "One Less Lonely Girl", peaked within the top ten in Canada and top twenty in the United States. The promotional singles "Love Me" and "Favorite Girl" also peaked in the top forty of the US Billboard Hot 100 songs chart in 2009. The project was additionally promoted through television appearances and the My World Tour in 2010. The remix album My Worlds Acoustic and compilation album My Worlds: The Collection were released later in November 2010; the latter packaged My World, My World 2.0, and My Worlds Acoustic into a two-disc set. On February 12, 2016, My World was released on vinyl for the first time.

== Background and composition ==
Bieber first began his career through YouTube, posting videos of his performances in singing competitions for family members who could not attend. As his popularity on the website grew, he was discovered by his eventual manager Scooter Braun, who flew Bieber to Atlanta, Georgia to consult with recording artist Usher. He provided him with an audition for L.A. Reid of Island Records, and signed a recording contract in October 2008. In April 2009, after recording his debut single "One Time", Usher described Bieber as a "young phenomenon" and "definitely a priority for me and Island Def Jam." Bieber later described the record's title as "the only way [he] could really describe it", adding that it represented "so many elements of [his] world".

"Down to Earth"
"Down to Earth" was co-written by Bieber and inspired by his parents' separation. It was complimented as a stand-out track from My World.

When recording My World, Bieber expressed a desire to "grow as an artist" and have "[his] fans grow with [him]". Musically, the project is similar to the catalogs of Chris Brown and Usher. Entertainment Weekly described the record as featuring "sugary puppy-love ballads and dinky dance-pop confections". Bieber looked to address a variety of lyrical themes, which he described as "songs that teens can relate to" and "just stuff that happens in everyday life".

The introductory track "One Time" discusses an admiration of a female and a desire to become her significant other. "Favorite Girl" shares a similar sentiment, describing the object of his affection as his "prized possession". The ballad "Down to Earth" was inspired by the separation of Bieber's parents, and was written to reassure fans in a similar situation "that it wasn't because of something they did". "Bigger" details an aspiration to work past the difficulties a relationship experiences. It was noted for experimenting with New jack swing elements that were prominent in Michael Jackson's eighth studio album Dangerous, and was also described as a "P.Y.T. rip". Bieber felt that "One Less Lonely Girl" was "really important [that] these girls have something so they can be one less lonely girl". The track was compared to Chris Brown's "With You" and Beyoncé's "Irreplaceable". "First Dance" features vocals from Usher, and garnered comparisons to Jackson's "You Are Not Alone". My World closes with "Love Me", which samples The Cardigans' "Lovefool" and was described by MTV News as a "widescreen club track that is full of bubbly synths and Bieber's now-signature croon".

== Singles ==
"One Time" was released on 18 May 2009, as the lead single from My World. It received generally favorable reviews from music critics, who complimented Bieber's vocals, but noted a lack of originality. The track peaked at number seventeen on the US Billboard Hot 100, and was later certified platinum by the Recording Industry Association of America (RIAA) for sales exceeding one million copies. Internationally, it peaked at number twelve of the Canadian Hot 100, where it was later certified platinum for sales over 10,000 units. The song also reached number eleven on the UK Singles Chart. It attained moderate success in other European territories, peaking within the top thirty in singles charts in Austria, Belgium, and Germany. An accompanying music video was released on 24 November 2009, and depicted Bieber throwing a party in Usher's house in his absence.

"One Less Lonely Girl" was released on 30 November 2009, as the second single from My World. It was met with a generally positive response, where Bieber's vocals were deemed strong enough to overshadow generic lyrical content. The track peaked at numbers ten and fifteen in the United States and Canada, respectively, and was certified platinum in the former country. Internationally, the song charted in the top thirty in Belgium and Germany. Its accompanying music video was released on 30 November 2009, and depicts Bieber searching for his crush, who had left her scarf at the local laundromat. "Love Me" and "Favorite Girl" were released as promotional singles to the iTunes Store prior to the release of My World. They peaked at numbers thirty-seven and twenty-six on the Billboard Hot 100, respectively.

== Promotion ==
Bieber originally promoted My World through a series of radio and television appearances. In summer 2009, he was featured on the radio stations Z100 and Radio Disney. In September, he appeared as a presenter during the 2009 MTV Video Music Awards, and performed "One Time" at the network's mtvU VMA Tour. In Canada, he performed "One Time" and "One Less Lonely Girl" during the finale of The Next Star at the end of the month. In October, Bieber performed "One Time", "One Less Lonely Girl" and "Favorite Girl" on Today's Toyota Concert Series; the crowd was the program's largest of the year, surpassing that of an earlier Miley Cyrus performance. He also appeared on It's On with Alexa Chung, The Ellen DeGeneres Show, Good Morning America, Lopez Tonight, Chelsea Lately, The Wendy Williams Show, and 106 and Park throughout November. Bieber also held a guest role on the Nickelodeon television series True Jackson, VP. During the winter, Bieber performed at several "Jingle Ball" holiday concerts. A performance as the Roosevelt Fields Mall in Long Island, New York was scheduled, but was cancelled after it was deemed an unsafe environment due to the exceptionally large crowd of 3,000 people. On 31 December, Bieber performed during the Dick Clark's New Year's Rockin' Eve with Ryan Seacrest.

In November 2009, Bieber collaborated with clothing retailer Urban Behavior to host the Urban Behavior Tour. It consisted of performances at five locations across five days. The first event was held on 1 November, at the Metropolis at Metrotown in Vancouver. The tour resumed on 3 November and continued through 6 November, during which dates he appeared at the West Edmonton Mall in Edmonton; the Centre Eaton in Montreal; the White Oaks Mall in London; and Vaughan Mills in Toronto. In December, Bieber traveled to Foxborough, Massachusetts and was featured as a guest performer for two dates of Taylor Swift's Fearless Tour. Bieber announced his My World Tour in March 2010, held in support of My World and his debut studio album My World 2.0. It started on 23 June at the XL Center in Hartford, Connecticut and concluded on 4 September at the Great Allentown Fair in Allentown, Pennsylvania. Bieber performed eighty-eight shows, sixty-seven of which became sold-out. In total, nearly 1.4 million tickets were sold, generating a revenue of over $53 million by its conclusion.

== Critical reception ==
Professional ratings
Aggregate scores
Source	Rating
Metacritic	65/100
Review scores
Source	Rating
AllMusic	3.5/5 stars
Billboard	(favorable)
The Boston Globe	(mixed)
Entertainment Weekly	(B−)
The New York Times	(favorable)
Rolling Stone	3/5 stars
Toronto Star	3.5/4 stars
The Washington Post	(favorable)

At Metacritic, which assigns a normalized rating out of 100 to reviews from mainstream critics, My World received an average score of 65, based on six reviews, indicating "generally favorable reviews". Andy Kellman from Allmusic complimented the material as being "the kind of age-appropriate content that would fill out a release from a younger Chris Brown or a junior version of Ne-Yo", adding that his charisma made up for lacking lyrical depth. Writing for Billboard, a reviewer opined that the strength of the material opened the possibility of Bieber "racking up more hits in the next decade to come". Mikael Wood of Entertainment Weekly commended "Love Me" as a "killer electro-glam groove" and expressed a desire to see Bieber's "swagger" advance with age. The New York Times's Jon Caramanica provided a favorable review, describing "One Less Lonely Girl" as an "uncomplicatedly beautiful and earnest" track.

Rob Sheffield of Rolling Stone selected "First Dance", "Bigger", and "Love Me" as his personal stand-out tracks from the project. Toronto Star's Ashante Infantry described Bieber's vocals as those of a "young Chris Brown with overdubbed New Edition-style harmonies", adding that the production and songwriting worked well with his "earnest pubescent vocals". Writing for The Boston Globe, Marc Hirsch provided a mixed review, commenting that Bieber was "indistinguishable" from the popular mainstream artists, but noted "Down to Earth" as an "essential" track from the record. Alison Stewart from The Washington Post was pleased that Bieber co-wrote several of the tracks, but was less optimistic of the prominent use of Auto-Tune. At the Juno Awards of 2010, My World was nominated for the Album of the Year and the Pop Album of the Year, but lost to Crazy Love by Michael Bublé in both categories.

== Commercial performance ==
In the United States, My World debuted at number six on the Billboard 200 with first-week sales of 137,000 copies. In doing so, it became the strongest-debuting release for a new artist in 2009. However, it was topped the following week by I Dreamed a Dream by Susan Boyle, which moved 701,000 units. In its sixth week of availability, the record moved 157,000 copies, displaying stronger sales than its debut week. It was certified gold by the Recording Industry Association of America (RIAA) on 14 December 2009, for sales exceeding 500,000 copies. It attained platinum recognition on 8 January 2010, after moving over one million units. After his debut studio album My World 2.0 debuted at number one in March 2010, its predecessor reached a new peak at number five, making Bieber the first artist since Nelly in 2004 to have two titles in the top five of the Billboard 200.

Internationally, My World enjoyed similar success. The extended play debuted at number one on the Canadian Albums Chart, where it was later certified double-platinum for sales of 160,000 copies. In Austria, the record peaked at number two, and eventually earned a platinum certification for sales of 20,000 copies. The project reached number seven in Germany, and was later recognized as a platinum-selling release after moving 200,000 units. In the United Kingdom, it peaked at number three, and attained triple-platinum recognition for sales of 900,000 copies.

== Acoustic and The Collection ==
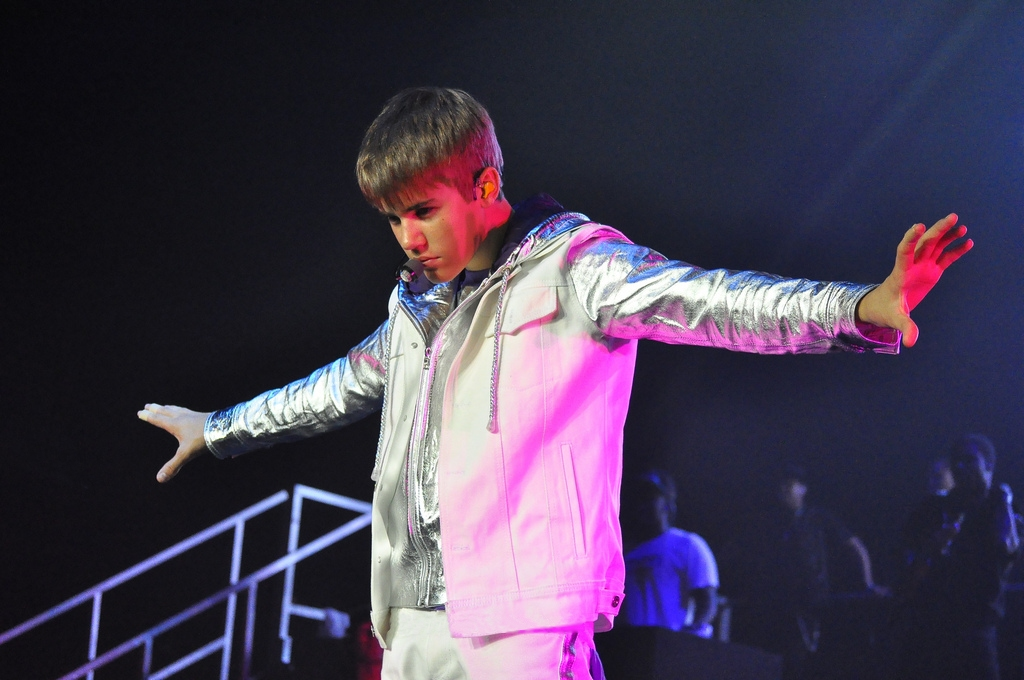
Bieber performing in Bogor, Indonesia during his My World Tour, 2010.

The remix album My Worlds Acoustic was released on 22 November 2010. It was originally distributed as a Walmart-exclusive release, but was made available through the iTunes Store on 8 February 2011. The track list consisted of four re-recorded tracks each from My World and My World 2.0, in addition to the then-recently recorded songs "Pray" and "Never Say Never". Music critics appreciated Bieber's increasingly maturing vocals, but felt that the set lacked fully acoustic material, making its title misleading. Having only been released in North America, the record debuted at numbers four and seven in Canada and the United States, respectively.

International territories were provided with the compilation album My Worlds: The Collection on 19 November 2010. The first disc featured an expanded version of My World Acoustic, while the second disc consolidated My World and My World 2.0 into one track listing. Music critics reinforced previous compliments of the individual albums, but questioned if his modestly sized catalog warranted the need for a reissue. The compilation charted modestly in Europe, peaking in the lower positions of album charts in Finland, Greece, and Sweden and in the top twenty in Denmark and the Netherlands.

== Track listing ==
Credits adapted from liner notes of My World.

No.	Title	Writer(s)	Producer(s)	Length
1.	"One Time"	C. "Tricky" Stewart; James Bunton; Corron Cole; Thabiso Nkhereanye	JB & Corron; Stewart; Kuk Harrell (vocals)	3:35
2.	"Favorite Girl"	Dernst "D'Mile" Emile II; Delisha Thomas; Antea Birchett; Anesha Birchett	Emile II	4:16
3.	"Down to Earth"	Justin Bieber; Waynne Nugent; Kevin Risto; Mason Levy; Carlos Battey; Steven Battey	Dirty Swift; Bruce Waynne	4:05
4.	"Bigger"	Bieber; Nugent; Risto; Dapo Torimiro; Lonny Breaux	Dirty Swift; Bruce Waynne; Torimiro	3:17
5.	"One Less Lonely Girl"	Ezekiel "Zeke" Lewis; Balewa Muhammad; Sean P. Hamilton; Hyuk Shin; Usher Raymond IV	Lewis; Muhammad; Hamilton; Shin	3:49
6.	"First Dance" (featuring Usher)	Bieber; Raymond IV; Alexander Parhm Jr.; Ryon Lovett; Jesse Wilson; Dwight Reynolds	Pretty Boi Fresh	3:42
7.	"Love Me"	Bruno Mars; Philip Lawrence; Ari Levine; Peter Svensson; Nina Persson	DJ Frank E; Bill Malina (vocal)	3:12
Total length:				25:58

Canadian iTunes Store bonus tracks
No.	Title	Writer(s)	Producer(s)	Length
8.	"One Less Lonely Girl" (French vocal)	Lewis; Muhammad; Hamilton; Shin; Raymond IV; Andrée Watters	Lewis; Muhammad; Hamilton; Shin	3:48
9.	"Common Denominator"	Lashaunda "Babygirl" Carr; Bieber	Carr	4:02
10.	"One Less Lonely Girl" (music video)	Lewis; Muhammad; Hamilton; Shin; Raymond IV		3:48
11.	"One Time" (music video)	Stewart; Bunton; Cole; Nkhereanye		4:02

Sample credits

- "Love Me" contains an interpolation of "Lovefool" (1996), performed by Swedish band The Cardigans.

== Personnel ==
Credits adapted from liner notes of My World.

- Justin Bieber – lead and background vocals
- Taylor Graves –background vocals
- Bonnie McKee – background vocals
- Dwight "Skrapp" Reynolds – keyboard
- Tim Stewart – guitar

Production

- Antea Birchett – producer
- Anesha Birchett – producer
- Scooter Braun – executive producer
- Lashaunda "Babygirl" Carr – producer
- DJ Frank E – producer
- Blake Eiseman – recording
- Dernst Emile II – producer
- Jaycen Joshua-Fowler – mixing
- Alexander "Prettyboifresh" Parhm Jr – producer
- Christy Hall – production assistant
- Sean P. Hamilton – producer
- Kuk Harrell – producer
- Christopher Hicks – album producer
- Chris Kraus – recorder
- Ezekiel Lewis – producer
- Giancarlo Lino – mixing assistant
- Ryon Lovett – producer
- Bill Malina – vocal production
- Balewa Muhammad – producer
- Terius Nash – producer
- Waynne Nugent – producer
- Dave Pensado – mixing
- Usher Raymond IV – Vocals, executive producer
- Antonio "LA" Reid– executive producer
- Kevin Risto – producer
- Gabriella Schwartz – marketing
- Hyuk Shin – producer
- Jeremy Stevenson – recording
- Christopher "Tricky" Stewart – producer
- Brian Thomas – recording
- Dapo Torimiro – producer
- Bruce Waynne – producer
- Jesse Wilson – producer
- Andrew Wuepper – mixing assistant

Design

- Zack Atkinson – art direction and design
- Chris Baldwin – poster photography
- Pamela Littky – photography
- Daria Hines – styling
- Doug Joswick – package production

Business

- Ian Allen – business affairs
- A.J. Benson – A&R
- Leesa D. Brunson – A&R
- Rosalind Harrel – A&R consultant
- Steve Owens – A&R consultant
- Vanessa Price – grooming
- Yolanda Ray – A&R
- Aaron Rosenburg – legal counsel
- Todd Russell – art direction & design
- Tashia Stafford – A&R
- Antionete Trotman – business affairs
- Nicole Wyskoarko – business affairs

== Charts ==
=== Weekly charts ===
Chart (2009–2010)	Peak position
Australian Albums (ARIA)	79
Austrian Albums (Ö3 Austria)	2
Belgian Albums (Ultratop Flanders)	16
Belgian Albums (Ultratop Wallonia)	23
Canadian Albums (Billboard)	1
Danish Albums (Hitlisten)	9
Dutch Albums (Album Top 100)	52
German Albums (Offizielle Top 100)	7
Greek Albums (IFPI)	10
Irish Albums (IRMA)	11
Mexican Albums (Top 100 Mexico)	22
Portuguese Albums (AFP)	2
Spanish Albums (Promusicae)	71
Swiss Albums (Schweizer Hitparade)	39
UK Albums (Official Charts)	3
US Billboard 200	5

=== Year-end charts ===
Chart (2010)	Position
Austrian Albums (Ö3 Austria)	25
Belgian Albums (Ultratop Flanders)	48
Belgian Albums (Ultratop Wallonia)	87
Canadian Albums (Billboard)	11
German Albums (Offizielle Top 100)	34
UK Albums (OCC)	12
US Billboard 200	8

Chart (2011)	Position
Austrian Albums (Ö3 Austria)	62
UK Albums (OCC)	80
US Billboard 200	108

=== Decade-end charts ===
Chart (2010–2019)	Position
UK Albums (OCC)	73
US Billboard 200	91

== Certifications ==
Region	Certification	Certified units/sales
Austria (IFPI Austria)	Platinum	20,000^{*}
Canada (Music Canada)	2× Platinum	160,000^{^}
Denmark (IFPI Danmark)	Gold	10,000^{‡}
Germany (BVMI)	Platinum	200,000^{^}
Portugal (AFP)	4× Platinum	80,000^{^}
United Kingdom (BPI)	3× Platinum	900,000^{‡}
United States (RIAA)	3× Platinum	3,000,000^{‡}
^{*} Sales figures based on certification alone.^{^} Shipments figures based on certification alone.^{‡} Sales+streaming figures based on certification alone.

== Release history ==
Country	Date	Label
United States	November 17, 2009	Island Records
Canada	November 17, 2009	Universal Music
Australia	November 20, 2009	Universal Music
United Kingdom	January 18, 2010	Mercury Records
France	March 22, 2010	Mercury Records, Universal Music
Worldwide (vinyl)	February 12, 2016	Island Records
