= Love Me (Justin Bieber song) =

Promotional single by Justin Bieber

from the EP My World
- Released: October 26, 2009
- Recorded: 2009
- Studio: Serenity Sound Recording Studio (Los Angeles, California); Side 3 Studios (Denver, Colorado)
- Genre: Electropop; R&B; dance-pop
- Length: 3:12
- Label: Island; RBMG
- Songwriters: Bruno Mars; Philip Lawrence; Ari Levine; Peter Svensson; Nina Persson
- Producer: DJ Frank E

Justin Bieber promotional singles chronology
"Love Me" (2009)	"Favorite Girl" (2009)

Music video
- "Love Me" on YouTube

"Love Me" is a song by Canadian singer Justin Bieber. It was written by Bruno Mars, Philip Lawrence, Ari Levine, Peter Svensson and Nina Persson, and produced by DJ Frank E. The song was released exclusively to iTunes as the first promotional single from Bieber's debut EP, My World, on October 26, 2009.

An electropop song which also contains dance-pop and R&B elements, the chorus interpolates the 1996 single "Lovefool" by the Swedish band the Cardigans. "Love Me" was one of the most well-received tracks on the EP, with critics complimenting its electro and club feel and its usage of the "Lovefool" sample.

The song peaked in Canada and in the U.S. at twelve and thirty-seven, respectively. The song also charted in the United Kingdom on its main chart and R&B chart, and in Australia. The music video for the song was released on August 3, 2010 and serves as a "tribute to his worldwide fans, thanking them for their support". The dominant scenes are made of up of live performances, behind-the-scenes footage, and Bieber standing in front of a blue and white backdrop dancing. Bieber opened every show on his My World Tour with the song.

== Background ==
"Love Me"
"Love Me" is described as " a widescreen club track" with "bubbly synths", and Bieber's now "signature croon"

The song was produced by DJ Frank E at Side 3 Studios in Denver, Colorado. It was recorded by Bill Malina at Serenity Sound Studio in Hollywood, California. Mixing was done by Dave Pensado and Jaycen-Joshua Fowler, at Larrabee Studios in North Hollywood, California. Taylor Graves and Bonnie McKee provided background vocals.

Bieber originally stated that the third single from his debut album to be released exclusively on iTunes would be an acoustic remix of his lead single, "One Time", and that it would be released on October 27, 2009. However plans were changed, and a week before the release, Bieber announced that a new song, "Love Me" would be released. It was released a day early on October 26. Bieber took to Twitter with his shock saying that he was surprised himself.

== Composition ==
"Love Me" is a pop song, which makes use of guitars/bass and drums sounds. The chorus interpolates the song "Lovefool" by the Swedish band the Cardigans. According to the sheet music published at Musicnotes.com by Universal Music Publishing, Ltd., "Love Me" is set in common time. The song is composed in the key of C minor with Bieber's vocals spanning from the low-note of B♭_{3} to the high-note of E♭_{5}. The song follows in the chord progression of Cm–A♭–E♭–B♭

== Reception ==
The song was one of the most well-received on the EP. Mikael Wood of Entertainment Weekly said "Bieber's better on "Love Me", where he riffs on the Cardigans' "Lovefool" atop a killer electro-glam groove." Mark Hirsh The Boston Globe, which was one of the few reviewers that gave the EP a mixed analysis, said that "Love Me" was the essential song on the set. Washington Post also cited the song as one of the album's best, referring to it as a "modest club track." The New York Times said the track is "probably the only release in recent memory that owes debts to both the Cardigans." Mike Diver of BBC Music called the song an "electro-infused reinterpretation of The Cardigans' Lovefool, where Bieber exhibits the right kind of attitude, playful and endearing." Diver preferred Bieber in the song and wanted more of "the cheeky chap rightfully having the time of his young life", rather than the "adolescent playboy". "Love Me" had debuted on the Canadian Hot 100 and Billboard Hot 100 at twelve and thirty-seven. It spent twelve non-consecutive weeks on the Canadian chart and four in the United States. On the week ending January 10, 2010, "Love Me" entered the UK Singles Chart at eighty-two, and later peaked at seventy-one. It also debuted and peaked on the UK R&B chart at twenty-three, remaining on the chart for three weeks. It debuted in Australia at 100 and peaked at 65.

== Music video ==
Justin Bieber making a heart with a blue background relative to the song's theme. Bieber seen performing in front of a large crowd.

The music video for "Love Me" was directed by Alfredo Flores with Bieber as co-director. It was released on August 3, 2010. Bieber said the video serves as a "tribute to his worldwide fans, thanking them for their support". The dominant scenes are made of up of live performances. Other scenes of the video feature behind-the-scenes footage such as; rehearsal sessions, fan meet and greets, making radio appearances, jokingly walking around with toilet paper sticking out of his pants, and scenes with friends and family. Bieber's mentor, Usher, also makes an appearance in the video. The video also incorporates Bieber standing in front of a "simple [white] backdrop" dancing and "draw[ing] hearts in the air, presumably directed at his loving fanbase" relative to the songs theme, "Love Me".

== Promotion ==
Bieber performed the song several times including at the new Microsoft Store grand opening in Mission Viejo, California, on the Fearless Tour, on his radio promotion tour and Jingle Ball tour, and CBS's The Early Show as a part of their Super Bowl programming. He also performed it in an unaired segment of VH1's Pepsi Super Bowl Fan Jam, and at the 2010 Houston Rodeo with Selena Gomez. Bieber performed the song at a concert at the Hollywood Palladium. In a review of the performance, August Brown of the Los Angeles Times, said commended the song, saying the song "tacks the indie-pop chorus from the Cardigans' "Lovefool" onto en-vogue trance synthesizers and martial dance beats."

== Credits and personnel ==
- Songwriting – Bruno Mars, Philip Lawrence, Ari Levine, Peter Svensson, Nina Persson
- Production – DJ Frank E
- Background vocals – Taylor Graves, Bonnie McKee
- Vocal production and recording – Bill Malina and DJ Frank E, assisted by Paul Bailey and JP "The Specialist" Negrete
- Mixing – Jaycen Joshua-Fowler and Dave Pensado, assisted by Giancarlo Lino

== Charts ==
Chart performance for "Love Me"
Chart (2009–2010)	Peak position
Australia (ARIA)	65
Canada Hot 100 (Billboard)	12
Scottish Singles Sales (Official Charts)	56
UK Singles (Official Charts)	71
UK Hip Hop/R&B (Official Charts)	23
US Billboard Hot 100	37

== Certifications ==
Certifications for "Love Me"
Region	Certification	Certified units/sales
Australia (ARIA)	Platinum	70,000^{‡}
Brazil (Pro-Música Brasil)	Gold	30,000^{‡}
Denmark (IFPI Danmark)	Gold	45,000^{‡}
New Zealand (RMNZ)	Gold	15,000^{‡}
United Kingdom (BPI)	Silver	200,000^{‡}
United States (RIAA)	Platinum	1,000,000^{‡}
^{‡} Sales+streaming figures based on certification alone.
