= Favorite Girl =

Promotional single by Justin Bieber

from the album My World
- Released: November 2, 2009
- Genre: Teen pop
- Length: 4:15
- Label: Island; RBMG
- Songwriters: Dernst Emile II, Antea Birchett, Anesha Birchett, Delisha Thomas
- Producer: Dernst Emile II

Justin Bieber promotional singles chronology
"Love Me" (2009)	"Favorite Girl" (2009)	"Never Let You Go" (2010)

"Favorite Girl" is a song by Canadian singer Justin Bieber. The song was written and produced by D'Mile, and Antea Birchett, Anesha Birchett, and Delisha Thomas also receive writing credits. Bieber debuted the acoustic version of his song in his official YouTube account after American singer Taylor Swift used Bieber's single "One Time" as background music in one of her video tour diaries. The song was later released exclusively to iTunes as the second promotional single from his debut studio release, My World on November 2, 2009.

The song is mid-tempo and merges teen pop and R&B elements. It debuted at number 12 and 26 in Canada and the United States, respectively. It also charted at number 92 Australia, and at numbers 76 and 27 in the United Kingdom and the UK R&B chart, respectively. Bieber performed the song on several occasions, most of them being the acoustic version of the song, including as a supporting act on Swift's Fearless Tour.

== Background ==
"Favorite Girl"
"Favorite Girl" has elements of both teen pop and R&B music

Singer Taylor Swift used Bieber's "One Time" as background music and music that she and her friends were dancing to in a tour video diary that she posted on her official YouTube account in August 2009. In response to Swift using his song, Bieber posted an acoustic rendition of the then never-before heard "Favorite Girl" on his YouTube. When asked about his learning of Swift using his song, Bieber stated, "It was really funny because I heard about it from a fan. I watched it and it was hilarious!" Bieber and Swift then met in person at the 2009 MTV Video Music Awards, and she later invited him to be a special guest on her Fearless Tour when she returned to the United Kingdom.

The song was written by Dernst "D'Mile" Emile II, Antea Birchett, Anesha Birchet, and Delisha Thomas. Emile also has production credits. The song was recorded by Blake Eisemen at Icon Studios in Atlanta, Georgia, where Bieber's career is based. Mixing was done by Dave Pensado and Jaycen-Joshua Fowler, at Larrabee Studios in North Hollywood, California. The song became a popular trending topic on Twitter on the day of its release. "Favorite Girl" be is a teen-pop song, which integrates characteristics of R&B music. According to the sheet music published at Musicnotes.com by Universal Music Publishing, Ltd., "Favorite Girl" is set in common time, and has a moderate tempo of 88 beats per minute. It is composed in the key of E minor with Bieber's vocals spanning from the low-note of G_{3} to the high-note of B_{4}. The song follows in the chord progression of C–Em–G

== Chart performance ==
The song had hot shot debuts and limited stays on the U.S. Billboard Hot 100 and Canadian Hot 100 due to the single being released via iTunes only. It debuted in the U.S. at number twenty-six on the week ending November 21, 2009, and remained on the chart for two weeks. The same week it debuted at number fifteen in Canada, remaining on the chart for two weeks. The song returned to the Canadian Hot 100 at number ninety-nine on the week ending January 9, 2010. In 2010, the chart also appeared on the UK Singles Chart at seventy-six, and on the UK R&B Chart.

== Performances ==
Most Bieber performances of the song are of the acoustic rendition. Bieber originally performed the song for the first time, acoustically, when he appeared for a second time on The Ellen DeGeneres Show on November 3, 2009, the same day the song was released to iTunes. Regarding the performance, MTV News praised the song as a "funky, groovy, swaggerific jam". Bieber performed the song on the Fearless Tour, during Winter 2009 while performing at radio station-hosted Jingle Ball concerts, and during a live session with MTV, in which he was named MTV's Artist of the Week. During the live session with MTV, he performed the song while playing the keyboard. In a review of his acoustic performance of the song at Z100's 2009 Jingle Ball, Jon Caramanica of The New York Times called it his best performance of the night.

== Charts ==
2009–2010 chart performance for "Favorite Girl"
Chart (2009–2010)	Peak position
Australia (ARIA)	92
Canada Hot 100 (Billboard)	15
Scotland Singles (OCC)	69
UK Singles (OCC)	76
UK Hip Hop/R&B (OCC)	27
US Billboard Hot 100	26

2022 chart performance for "Favorite Girl"
Chart (2022)	Peak position
Indonesia (Billboard)	16

2026 chart performance for "Favorite Girl"
Chart (2026)	Peak position
Global 200 (Billboard)	89
Malaysia (IFPI)	10
Malaysia International (RIM)	7
Philippines (IFPI)	17
Philippines Hot 100 (Billboard Philippines)	17
UK Hip Hop/R&B (OCC)	26

== Certifications ==
Certifications for "Favorite Girl"
Region	Certification	Certified units/sales
Australia (ARIA)	Gold	35,000^{‡}
New Zealand (RMNZ)	Gold	15,000^{‡}
United States (RIAA)	Gold	500,000^{*}
^{*} Sales figures based on certification alone.^{‡} Sales+streaming figures based on certification alone.
