= Never Let You Go (Justin Bieber song) =

Promotional single by Justin Bieber

from the album My World 2.0
- Released: March 2, 2010
- Recorded: 2009–2010, Doppler Studios (Atlanta, Georgia)
- Genre: Teen pop, R&B
- Length: 4:24
- Label: Island
- Songwriters: Justin Bieber, Johntá Austin, Bryan-Michael Cox
- Producers: Johntá Austin, Bryan-Michael Cox

Justin Bieber promotional singles chronology
"Favorite Girl" (2009)	"Never Let You Go" (2010)	"Turn to You (Mother's Day Dedication)" (2012)

Music video
- "Never Let You Go" on YouTube

"Never Let You Go" is a song recorded by Canadian singer Justin Bieber for his debut album, My World 2.0 (2010). The track was written by Bieber and was co-written and produced by production duo Johntá Austin and Bryan-Michael Cox. It was released as a promotional single from the album on March 2, 2010 by Island Records. The song charted within the top twenty in Canada and New Zealand, twenty-one in the United States, and in the lower regions of the charts in Australia and the United Kingdom, respectively. The accompanying music video features Bieber and Paige Hurd at the Atlantis Resort in The Bahamas, including scenes at the resort, an aquarium, and on the coast. Bieber performed the song a number of times, including on BET's SOS: Saving Ourselves - Help for Haiti Telethon, which benefited victims of the 2010 Haiti earthquake.

== Composition and critical reception ==
"Never Let You Go"
A sample of "Never Let You Go" which has been compared to Chris Brown's "Forever."

"Never Let You Go" published in common time with moderate tempo. "Never Let You Go" written in D minor key with the chord progression B♭-Dm-C. Leah Greenblatt of Entertainment Weekly noted similarities between "Never Let You Go" and Chris Brown's "Forever", calling the previous a "fraternal twin" to the latter. Jody Rosen of Rolling Stone, using "Never Let You Go" and "Stuck in the Moment" as examples said that "the ballads — often a weak spot on pop/R&B records — are fully realized, mixing love-struck lyrics with big, lovable choruses." Lauren Carter of The Boston Herald stated that, "While it's hard to buy into so much angst coming from a 16-year-old, the promises of forever (see "Never Let You Go," for starters) will undoubtedly delight the young girls who dream of spending eternity with pop's newest heartthrob."

== Chart performance ==
"Never Let You Go" debuted and peaked at number twenty-one in the United States on the Billboard Hot 100. It was listed on the chart for two weeks before dropping off. The song, like previous digital-only singles of Bieber's, had limited stays on the charts, and holds the record for the second all-time biggest week-to-week descent in Hot 100 history, behind Justin Timberlake's cover of "Hallelujah" and the Jonas Brothers' "Pushin' Me Away". It debuted and peaked at fourteen in Canada, after spending four weeks on the Canadian Hot 100 it dropped off. Internationally, the song charted at sixty-seven in Australian Singles Chart, and reached sixteen on the New Zealand Singles Chart, where it was on the chart for three weeks. Via digital sales behind the release of My World 2.0, "Never Let You Go" reached eighty-four on the UK Singles Chart.

== Music video ==
Bieber on the cliff in front of the ocean and in front of the Atlantis resort with love interest Paige Hurd.

Rolling Stone confirmed in January 2010 that the music video had already been shot by director Colin Tilley while Bieber was at the Atlantis resort in Bahamas. Actress Paige Hurd portrays Bieber's love interest in the video. The video premiered on March 30, 2010 on Vevo. It was the new joint on BET's 106 & Park on April 5, 2010.

Summarizing the video, Jocelyn Vena MTV News said, "Bieber is seen hanging out in the catacombs of Bahamian aquariums...In this new clip, Bieber is seen performing on the beach and frolicking with Hurd. Bieber is definitely growing up a lot in this video — sharing near-kisses, touching and nuzzling with her boyfriend. Shots of the pair in silhouette holding hands play into the video's plot of two young teens falling in love in a very exotic locale." Vena also said that Bieber continues his "knack for Michael Jackson-esque dance moves." Simon Vozick-Levinson of Entertainment Weekly called the video "So romantic," as "they dance in an age-appropriate fashion." Chris Ryan of MTV News reviewed the video positively, stating that it is, "a really nice take on the innocence of young love, full of flirting, dancing and hair-touching." As of October 2023, the music video on YouTube achieved over 313 million views.

== Live performances ==
Bieber performed the song several times including at the new Microsoft Store grand opening in Mission Viejo, California, and in a live session with MTV. He also later performed it on The Early Show as a part of their 2010 Super Bowl programming, and on BET's SOS: Saving Ourselves - Help for Haiti Telethon, to benefit Haiti after the earthquake, performing live on February 6, 2010, which also aired on VH1, and MTV.

== Credits and personnel ==
- Songwriting - Justin Bieber, Bryan-Michael Cox, Johntá Austin
- Production - Bryan-Michael Cox, Johntá Austin
- Vocal recording - Sam Thomas
- Instruments - Bryan-Michael Cox
- Mixing - Manny Marroquin, assisted by Christian Plata and Erik Madrid

== Charts ==
Chart performance
Chart (2010)	Peak position
Australia (ARIA)	67
Canada Hot 100 (Billboard)	14
New Zealand (Recorded Music NZ)	16
Scottish Singles Sales (Official Charts)	74
UK Singles (Official Charts)	84
US Billboard Hot 100	21

== Certifications ==
Certifications
Region	Certification	Certified units/sales
Australia (ARIA)	Gold	35,000^{‡}
Brazil (Pro-Música Brasil)	Platinum	60,000^{‡}
United States (RIAA)	Platinum	1,000,000^{‡}
^{‡} Sales+streaming figures based on certification alone.
