= One Time (Justin Bieber song) =

Single by Justin Bieber

from the EP My World
- Released: May 18, 2009
- Studio: Triangle Sound Studios, Savannah, Georgia; The Boom Boom Room, Burbank, California
- Genre: Teen pop; pop-soul
- Length: 3:35
- Label: Island; RBMG
- Songwriters: Christopher "Tricky" Stewart; James Bunton; Corron Cole; Thabiso Nkhereanye
- Producers: The Movement; Christopher "Tricky" Stewart; Kuk Harrell

Justin Bieber singles chronology
| "One Time" (2009) | "One Less Lonely Girl" (2009) |

Music video
- "One Time" on YouTube

"One Time" is the debut single by Canadian singer Justin Bieber. It is the lead single from his debut EP, My World (2009). It was first solicited to mainstream and rhythmic radio on May 18, 2009. It was released via digital download in the United States and Canada on July 7, 2009, and was released in several other countries during autumn 2009. An acoustic version of the song called "My Heart Edition" was released digitally on December 22, 2009. The song is a teen pop song, moderately paced with pop-soul influences, about puppy love.

The song received positive reviews from critics, commending its production, vocals, and quality of lyrics. Critics noted that "One Time" was inspired by singer Chris Brown's early work. The song was a commercial success, reaching the top twenty in Canada, the US, Germany, the United Kingdom, France, and New Zealand and also charted in several other countries. The single has been certified Platinum in Canada and the US. The accompanying music video portrays Bieber at a house party and features his mentor, Usher, and hometown friend, Ryan Butler. As of July 2022, the video had been viewed over 714 million times on the video-sharing website YouTube. Bieber performed the song in a number of live appearances including The Dome, The Next Star, and Dick Clark's New Year's Rockin' Eve with Ryan Seacrest.

== Background ==
The song was written for Bieber by veteran US hip-hop/R&B producer and songwriter Christopher "Tricky" Stewart, and songwriter and vocal producer Kuk Harrell for their RedZone Entertainment, as his debut single. Before they produced and wrote Bieber's debut they had penned several hits, including Beyoncé's "Single Ladies", Mariah Carey's "Obsessed", Fabolous's "Throw It In the Bag" and others. "One Time" was produced by Stewart and production duo the Movement, while Harrell provided vocal recording and production. The Movement also received writing credits for the song as did Thabiso Nkhereanye. Bieber recorded the song at RedZone's Triangle Sound Studios in Savannah, Georgia a few hours away from Bieber's then current home of Atlanta, Georgia. Bieber also recorded some of the track at The Boom Boom Room in Burbank, California. Mixing was done in Atlanta at Silent Sound Studios by Jaycen-Joshua Fowler and Dave Pensado.

== Composition ==
"One Time"
A 30 second sample of "One Time" where the end of the second verse is present, and the chorus is backed by the "Your World..." bridge.

"One Time" is described to be in a "moderately slow groove". Washington Post called the track, along with 'Love Me' "modest club tracks." About.com described it as a "solid midtempo beat." The song is composed in the key of C♯ minor. The song is moderately paced, and the introduction and outro are sung in a sing-and-tell format with Bieber repetitively voicing the line "Me plus you/Imma tell you one time." The verses are sung with backing R&B infused bass beats with a light string background in the same moderate pace before the bridge prepares for the refrain through the lines "Your world is my world/My fight is your fight/My breath is your breath/And your heart." Bieber goes into the middle eight the backing is not as much indistinguishable from the rest of the song, but is delivered a little slower leading up to the chorus and outro.

== Critical reception ==
Bill Lamb of About.com called the song a "perfect kickoff to the career of Justin Bieber", noting the song had an effect of a younger Chris Brown, commended the production of The-Dream and Tricky Stewart for making the single contemporary and commercial. However Lamb criticized the song for being too "generic", and that Bieber had little room to show his voice. Billboard's Michael Menachem called the song "a hallmark pop song that also taps into a prevalent teen hip-hop aesthetic". He also compared Bieber to Brown on the track, and said that "[Bieber's] tenor brings to mind [Brown's] vocal debut on "Run It!" in 2005, when he, too, was 15 and on the cusp of stardom". Unlike Lamb, Menachem said the song gave Bieber's vocals plenty of room to shine as he confidently breaks into the chorus. Leah Greenblat of Entertainment Weekly named the song one of the hottest songs of fall of 2009, saying that Bieber's "pop-soul bonafides with this refreshingly age-appropriate chronicle of young love."

== Chart performance ==
The song entered at number ninety-five on the Billboard Hot 100 for the week of July 25, 2009. The song stayed on the chart for nearly six months before eventually peaking at number seventeen on the chart. Although the song didn't gain momentum until the near end of 2009, it managed to chart at number eighty-nine on the 2009 Billboard Year-End Hot 100, and eighty-one on the Year-End Canadian Hot 100. It was also number seventy-five on the Year End Hot Digital Singles. After lying dormant outside the top twenty for a few weeks, on the week labeled January 9, 2010, due to the release of "One Time: My Heart Edition" on iTunes, and increased sales of My World, the song made a thirty spot jump from forty-seven to number seventeen, reaching a new peak on the chart. The song debuted on the Billboard Pop chart at number eighty-four as the highest debut of the week. It has since peaked at number fourteen. It reached number twelve in Canada, where it remained on the chart for twenty consecutive weeks. The single was certified Platinum in Canada by CRIA in September 2009. It was certified Platinum by the RIAA in the United States in January 2010, selling over a million copies. As of February 2011, the single had been sold over 2,132,000 times.

The song has also achieved international success. It debuted in Belgium (Flanders) at twenty-six and peaked at twelve on the bubbling under chart, equivalent to peaking at sixty-two on the main chart. It debuted on the Belgium (Wallonia) tip chart at twenty-six in its first week, the week ending January 16, 2010, and has since peaked at six, equivalent to peaking at forty-four on the main chart. The song debuted in Austria at seventy-one on the week of September 4, 2009, and peaked at thirty, remaining on the chart for eleven weeks. "One Time" debuted at fourteen in Germany, which became its peak position on the chart. The song debuted in Australia at number eighty-two and later reached a peak of twenty-three. In Ireland the song debuted at forty-five on the Irish Singles Chart. It has since peaked at thirty-one on the chart. The song debuted on the UK Singles Chart at 135, and jumped to fourteen on January 10, 2010. A week later on January 17, 2010, the song jumped again to number eleven, just missing out on the top ten. The song peaked at number six in New Zealand, and at thirteen in France.

== Music video ==
Bieber featured in front of the gray-azure backdrop and in the pool scene with Usher in the video.

The music video, directed by Vashtie Kola, was posted by Bieber on his YouTube channel on June 13, 2009, almost a month before the single was released to iTunes. Bieber's mentor, Usher and one of his closest friends, Ryan Butler make appearances in the video. It features Bieber clad in a grey hooded sweatshirt grinning mischievously into the camera. As of May 2025, the video had been viewed over 800 million times on YouTube. Bieber made a comment stating "It was really cool going from my webcam to professional videos". In a review of the video Entertainment Weekly's Leah Greenblat said: "Bieber does seem to share many of the qualities that made his idols the pop/R&B superstars they've become, including a clear, supple voice, pinup-boy looks, and bona fide instrument skills".

In the music video, Usher, Bieber and Butler all portray themselves as the latter two are at Usher's house playing video games. Bieber receives a phone call from Usher, in which he asks him if could he watch the house until he gets back. After agreeing, Bieber holds a house party and tries to get close to one girl in particular, played by Kristen McDow (then known as Kristen Rodeheaver according to her maiden name), but is disappointed because he thought they were bonding but at the end of the video when they are sitting together at the pool, she kisses him on the cheek, then leaves. Originally, Rodeheaver and Bieber were supposed to hold hands and jump into the pool, but it was too cold. He then stands up and gets caught by Usher.

== Live performances ==
Bieber performed the song on his promotional "My World" tour throughout the US. Internationally, he appeared on the German program The Dome and performed "One Time". As far as televised performances go, he performed "One Time" on MTV's VMA Tour to precede the 2009 MTV Video Music Awards, September 26, 2009, on YTV's The Next Star, and on the Today. He also performed the song on The Ellen DeGeneres Show on November 3, 2009; Good Morning America on November 15, 2009; Lopez Tonight on November 17, 2009, and The Wendy Williams Show on November 27, 2009. The song was Bieber's ending number while on his two-show stint as an opening act for Taylor Swift's Fearless Tour. On November 23, 2009, while performing in London on the tour, Bieber fractured his foot at the beginning of performing this song during Swift's Wembley Arena concert, but continued to perform the rest of the song. He was able to perform on stage the next night in Manchester, with a cast and limited dancing. After the televised appearances, the Urban Behavior Tour, and Fearless Tour, Bieber traveled in Europe to promote the album before returning to the US to resume his promotional tour. Bieber performed the song in Las Vegas for Dick Clark's New Year's Rockin' Eve with Ryan Seacrest on December 31, 2009. While promoting the album in the United Kingdom, Bieber performed an acoustic rendition of "One Time" on BBC's Blue Peter on January 12, 2010. He performed it on CBS' The Early Show as a part of their Super Bowl XLIV programming. Bieber performed the song at a concert at the Hollywood Palladium, and August Brown of the Los Angeles Times commented, "'One Time', helmed by white-hot producer Christopher 'Tricky' Stewart, is an endearing, swaggering little thing in which Bieber convincingly jumps from Usher’s rapid-fire runs to pristine pop harmonies."

== My Heart Edition ==
Acoustic cover on True Jackson, VP

Originally, an acoustic version of "One Time" was set to be released as a single on iTunes on October 27, 2009. However, plans were changed, and a week before the release, Bieber announced that another song, "Love Me", would be released as a single instead. Bieber later on announced on December 19, 2009, that an "exclusive unplugged Christmas [sic] version" of "One Time" would be released to iTunes the following Tuesday. The song was released a day early on December 21, 2009, and was titled "One Time (My Heart Edition)". The cover art for the single features a still from Bieber's music video for "One Less Lonely Girl". Kyle Anderson of MTV explained that the song "strips away the original track's synths and technology and leaves only Bieber's able voice". Bieber performed the acoustic version of the song when he guest starred on the Nickelodeon sitcom True Jackson, VP, during a live session with MTV, and on the British children's show Blue Peter. The track is featured on the various artists' compilation album Radio Disney Jams, Vol. 12 (2010).

== Charts ==
=== Weekly charts ===
| Chart (2009–2010) | Peak position |
|---|---|
| Australia (ARIA) | 23 |
| Austria (Ö3 Austria Top 40) | 30 |
| Belgium (Ultratip Bubbling Under Flanders) | 12 |
| Belgium (Ultratip Bubbling Under Wallonia) | 4 |
| Canada Hot 100 (Billboard) | 12 |
| Canada CHR/Top 40 (Billboard) | 20 |
| European Hot 100 Singles (Billboard) | 29 |
| France (SNEP) | 13 |
| Germany (GfK) | 14 |
| Ireland (IRMA) | 31 |
| Netherlands (Single Top 100) | 74 |
| New Zealand (Recorded Music NZ) | 6 |
| Scottish Singles Sales (Official Charts) | 14 |
| Sweden (Sverigetopplistan) | 55 |
| Switzerland (Schweizer Hitparade) | 66 |
| UK Singles (Official Charts) | 11 |
| US Billboard Hot 100 | 17 |
| US Pop Airplay (Billboard) | 14 |
| US Rhythmic Airplay (Billboard) | 17 |

| Chart (2026) | Peak position |
|---|---|
| Global 200 (Billboard) | 132 |
| Philippines Hot 100 (Billboard Philippines) | 22 |

=== Monthly charts ===
| Chart (2010) | Position |
|---|---|
| Brazil (Brasil Hot 100 Airplay) | 46 |
| Brazil (Brasil Hot Pop Songs) | 18 |

=== Year-end charts ===
| Chart (2009) | Position |
|---|---|
| Canada (Canadian Hot 100) | 81 |
| US Billboard Hot 100 | 89 |
| Chart (2010) | Position |
| Australia (ARIA) | 94 |
| Brazil (Crowley) | 89 |
| European Hot 100 Singles (Billboard) | 80 |
| France (SNEP) | 45 |
| Taiwan (Hito Radio) | 27 |
| UK Singles (OCC) | 132 |

== Certifications ==
| Region | Certification | Certified units/sales |
|---|---|---|
| Australia (ARIA) | 3× Platinum | 210,000^{‡} |
| Brazil (Pro-Música Brasil) | Diamond | 250,000^{‡} |
| Canada (Music Canada) | Platinum | 40,000^{*} |
| Denmark (IFPI Danmark) | Gold | 45,000^{‡} |
| New Zealand (RMNZ) | Platinum | 15,000^{*} |
| United Kingdom (BPI) | Gold | 400,000^{‡} |
| United States (RIAA) | 5× Platinum | 5,000,000^{‡} |
^{*} Sales figures based on certification alone.^{‡} Sales+streaming figures based on certification alone.

== Release history ==
| Region | Date | Format |
|---|---|---|
| United States | May 18, 2009 | Mainstream and rhythmic airplay |
| United States | July 7, 2009 | Digital download |
| United States and Canada | July 7, 2009 | Digital download |
| United Kingdom | January 4, 2010 | Digital download |
