= Believe Acoustic =

Remix album by Justin Bieber
- Released: January 29, 2013
- Genre: Acoustic
- Length: 36:22
- Labels: Island; RBMG; Schoolboy
- Producers: Justin Bieber; Dan Kanter; Josh Gudwin; Tom Strahle; Da Internz; Aaron Michael Cox

Justin Bieber chronology
Believe (2012)	Believe Acoustic (2013)	Journals (2013)

Believe Acoustic is the third remix album by the Canadian singer Justin Bieber. It was released on January 29, 2013, by Island Records as the follow-up to his second remix album, Never Say Never: The Remixes (2011). It is Bieber's second acoustic album, following My Worlds Acoustic (2010). The album has acoustic and live versions of songs from his third studio album Believe (2012), as well as three new recordings. The album went to number one on the US Billboard 200 albums chart, making this Bieber's fifth number-one album and seventh consecutive top-10 album in the United States.

== Background ==
Bieber confirmed the project on December 8, 2012, by tweeting, "Been writing a lot...new stuff...and yeah. the acoustic album, new arrangements, is happening." The track listing for the (then) EP was revealed on December 22, 2012, with eight tracks. On January 6, 2013, it was announced that 11 tracks would be on the album instead, including new songs "Nothing Like Us", "Yellow Raincoat" and "I Would".

== Critical reception ==
Professional ratings
Review scores
Source	Rating
AllMusic	2.5/5 stars
Digital Spy	3/5 stars
Rolling Stone	3/5 stars
The Washington Times	2.5/5 stars

Believe Acoustic received mixed reviews from music critics. Robert Copsey of Digital Spy wrote that the removal of the multi-layered production and "studio trickery" on Believe reveals a "smoother and less [...] babyish vocal than most will be familiar with". He noted that "embarrassingly weak lyrics" are a recurring issue throughout the album, though it is "largely saved" by Kanter, who "ensures the melodic hooks remain largely intact". He noted that it is "less of an issue" on the album's three new songs. He concluded, "We'd prefer the polished, shinier and glossier Justin Bieber any day." Andrew Leahy of The Washington Times cited Believe Acoustic as a way of "squeezing extra cash out of material that already has been released". He wrote that only a few of the new arrangements "shine any new light" on the original versions.

Andy Kellman of Allmusic wrote that like My Worlds Acoustic (2010), Believe Acoustic "maintains the flow of Bieber product following a proper studio album". He noted that the "playful side" of Believe is not "well-suited for earnest, stripped-down renderings" and added, "Party anthems like 'Beauty and a Beat' and lines like 'Chillin' by the fire while we eatin' fondue,' from 'Boyfriend,' seem silly when performed with the singer in serious artist mode." Jody Rosen of Rolling Stone wrote that as "cash-grab" remix albums go, Believe Acoustic offers a "little added value, for hardcore fans, at least". According to Rosen, the acoustic versions of "blustery" dance-pop songs like "All Around the World" and "Beauty and a Beat" sound "a tad wan", with "a six-string standing in for the synths and bludgeoning rhythms". She, however, thought that Bieber "gives the songs his best, and his raspy, soulful vocal tone stands out nicely against the stark musical backdrop". Rosen thought the best songs on the album were the three new studio tracks.

On February 9, 2013, Bieber gave a debut performance of "Nothing Like Us", a bonus track on Believe Acoustic on Saturday Night Live. He was both the host and musical guest and also performed an acoustic set of "As Long as You Love Me".

== Track listing ==
No.	Title	Writer(s)	Producer(s)	Length
1.	"Boyfriend" (acoustic version)	Justin Bieber; Mike Posner; Mason Levy; Matthew Musto	Bieber; Dan Kanter; Josh Gudwin*	3:07
2.	"As Long as You Love Me" (acoustic version)	Rodney "Darkchild" Jerkins; Andre Lindal; Nasri Atweh; Bieber; Sean Anderson	Bieber; Kanter; Gudwin*	3:42
3.	"Beauty and a Beat" (acoustic version)	Max Martin; Anton Zaslavski; Savan Kotecha; Onika Maraj	Bieber; Kanter; Gudwin*	2:24
4.	"She Don't Like the Lights" (acoustic version)	Jerkins; Lindal; Tiyon Mack; Bieber	Bieber; Kanter; Gudwin*	3:35
5.	"Take You" (acoustic version)	Bieber; Raphaël Judrin; Pierre-Antoine Melki; Ross Golan; James 'JHart' Abrahart; Alex Dezen; Ben Maddahi	Bieber; Kanter; Gudwin*	2:59
6.	"Be Alright" (acoustic version)	Bieber; Kanter	Bieber; Kanter; Gudwin*	3:30
7.	"All Around the World" (acoustic version)	Bieber; Atweh; Adam Messinger; Nolan Lambroza; Christopher Bridges	Bieber; Kanter; Gudwin*	2:36
8.	"Fall" (live)	Bieber; Levy; Jacob Lutrell	Bieber; Kanter; Gudwin*	3:41
9.	"Yellow Raincoat"	Bieber; Tom Strahle; Gudwin	Bieber; Strahle; Gudwin*	3:44
10.	"I Would"	Bieber; Marcos Palacios; Ernest Clark; Aaron Michael Cox; M. Moody; S. Fenton	Da Internz; Cox	3:47
11.	"Nothing Like Us"	Bieber	Bieber; Gudwin*	3:19

Note: (*) denotes a co-producer

== Personnel ==
Credits adapted from album's liner notes.

- Justin Bieber — vocals (all tracks), producer (tracks 1–9, 11), guitar (tracks 8, 9)
- Tim Carmon — grand piano (track 1)
- Aaron Michael Cox — producer and instrumentation (track 10)
- Da Internz — producer (track 10)
- Josh Gudwin — co-producer and engineer (tracks 1–9, 11)
- Brendan McReynolds — assistant engineer (tracks 1,3,4)
- Wizard Jones — grand piano (track 6)
- Jaycen Joshua — mixing (track 10)
- Dan Kanter — producer (tracks 1–8), guitar (tracks 1–5, 8)
- Dave Kutch — mastering
- Manny Marroquin — mixing (tracks 1–5, 7, 9)
- Tom Strahle — guitar (tracks 7, 9), producer (track 9)
- Phil Tan — mixing (tracks 6, 8, 11)

== Charts ==
=== Weekly charts ===
Chart (2013)	Peak position
Argentine Albums (CAPIF)	1
Australian Albums (ARIA)	2
Austrian Albums (Ö3 Austria)	7
Belgian Albums (Ultratop Flanders)	3
Belgian Albums (Ultratop Wallonia)	4
Brazilian Albums (Billboard)	1
Canadian Albums (Billboard)	1
Czech Albums (ČNS IFPI)	4
Danish Albums (Hitlisten)	3
Dutch Albums (Album Top 100)	4
French Albums (SNEP)	7
German Albums (Offizielle Top 100)	36
Hungarian Albums (MAHASZ)	16
Irish Albums (IRMA)	4
Italian Albums (FIMI)	5
Japanese Albums (Oricon)	50
Mexican Albums (Top 100 Mexico)^{[A]}	1
New Zealand Albums (RMNZ)	2
Norwegian Albums (VG-lista)	13
Polish Albums (ZPAV)	9
Portuguese Albums (AFP)	2
Scottish Albums (Official Charts)	5
Spanish Albums (Promusicae)	1
Swedish Albums (Sverigetopplistan)	4
Swiss Albums (Schweizer Hitparade)	3
UK Albums (Official Charts)	5
US Billboard 200	1
Venezuelan Albums (Recordland)	1

=== Year-end charts ===
Chart (2013)	Position
Belgian Albums (Ultratop Wallonia)	134
Canadian Albums (Billboard)	33
Spanish Albums (PROMUSICAE)	42
Swedish Albums (Sverigetopplistan)	52
UK Albums (OCC)	192
US Billboard 200	72

== Certifications ==
Region	Certification	Certified units/sales
Canada (Music Canada)	Platinum	80,000^{^}
Denmark (IFPI Danmark)	Platinum	20,000^{‡}
Norway (IFPI Norway)	Gold	15,000^{*}
Portugal (AFP)	Platinum	15,000^{^}
Sweden (GLF)	Gold	20,000^{‡}
United Kingdom (BPI)	Gold	100,000^{‡}
United States (RIAA)	Gold	500,000^{‡}
^{*} Sales figures based on certification alone.^{^} Shipments figures based on certification alone.^{‡} Sales+streaming figures based on certification alone.
