= Nothing Like Us =

Song by Justin Bieber

from the album Believe Acoustic
- Released: January 29, 2013
- Recorded: 2012
- Studio: Henson Recording Studios, Los Angeles, CA
- Genre: Acoustic
- Length: 3:19
- Label: Island; RBMG; School Boy
- Songwriter: Justin Bieber
- Producers: Justin Bieber; Josh Gudwin

Official audio
- "Nothing Like Us" on YouTube

"Nothing Like Us" is a song by Canadian singer Justin Bieber, taken from his third remix album, Believe Acoustic (2012). Bieber wrote the song in late 2012 during a period of sadness following a break-up with his former girlfriend. The song was produced by Bieber, along with his longtime collaborator Josh Gudwin. Bieber performed the song for the first time on Saturday Night Live, while promoting Believe Acoustic.

== Background ==
On January 6, 2013, it was announced that Bieber's upcoming acoustic album for Believe would feature three brand new tracks, including "Nothing Like Us", which "was written and produced solely by Justin and is described as giving 'an unprecedented and intimate glimpse of young love'."

During an interview with Billboard in 2013, when asked about the meaning behind the song, Bieber answered: "Because at the end of the day, there's nothing like us, you know? That's just it. It is what is it. People are going to relate to that." The singer further elaborated: "I'm not in the happiest place that I've ever been, I'm trying to get through what I'm going through. Like I said, I have my really close friends to cheer me up and keep me going."

== Release and live performances ==
Believe Acoustic was released on January 29, 2013, via RBMG/Island Def Jam Music Group. In the track-list, "Nothing Like Us" sits at number 11 out of the 11 tracks, the 3rd and final of the new studio recordings released with the album. The track debuted and peaked within the top 40 in three countries, Norway (11), Sweden (21), and Denmark (39), where it is currently certified Gold by IFPI Denmark. It also peaked at number 59 on the Billboard Hot 100 in the United States, where it was certified Gold by RIAA.

Following the album's release, Bieber performed the song on SNL, along with an acoustic rendition of "As Long As You Love Me", on February 9, 2013. He also performed the song on December 7, 2015, at a benefit concert for Stratford House of Blessing in Toronto.

== Personnel ==
Credits are adapted from the liner notes of Believe Acoustic.

- Justin Bieber – vocals, producer
- Josh Gudwin – co-producer, engineer
- Phil Tan – mixing

== Charts ==
Chart performance for "Nothing Like Us"
Chart (2013)	Peak position
Australia (ARIA)	73
Belgium (Ultratip Bubbling Under Flanders)	21
Canada (Canadian Hot 100)	43
Denmark (Tracklisten)	39
France (SNEP)	193
Ireland (IRMA)	73
Norway (VG-lista)	11
Scotland Singles (OCC)	68
Sweden (Sverigetopplistan)	21
UK Singles (OCC)	68
US Billboard Hot 100	59

== Certifications ==
Certifications for "Nothing Like Us"
Region	Certification	Certified units/sales
Australia (ARIA)	Gold	35,000^{‡}
United States (RIAA)	Gold	500,000^{‡}
Streaming
Denmark (IFPI Danmark)	Gold	900,000^{†}
^{‡} Sales+streaming figures based on certification alone.^{†} Streaming-only figures based on certification alone.
