= Believe Tour =

2012–13 concert tour by Justin Bieber

- World tour by Justin Bieber
- Location: Africa; Asia; Europe; North America; Oceania; South America
- Associated album: Believe
- Start date: September 29, 2012
- End date: December 8, 2013
- Legs: 7
- No. of shows: 155
- Box office: US$210 million ($283.47 million in 2024 dollars)

Justin Bieber concert chronology
- My World Tour (2010–2011); Believe Tour (2012–2013); Purpose World Tour (2016–2017)

The Believe Tour was the second concert tour by Canadian singer Justin Bieber. It was launched in support of his third studio album, Believe (2012). Beginning in September 2012, the tour played over 150 shows in the Americas, Europe, Asia, Africa, and Oceania.

In 2012, the tour placed 23rd on Pollstar's "Top 50 Worldwide Tours". The tour earned $40.2 million from 35 shows. For 2013, it ranked 5th on Pollstar's "Top 100 Worldwide Tours—Mid Year"; earning $69.9 million from 67 shows.

== Background ==
The tour was announced on May 23, 2012, during Bieber's appearance on The Ellen DeGeneres Show. Dates were revealed for shows in the United States and Canada later in the day. Bieber stated the tour would be the biggest show on Earth. Shows in the United Kingdom were reported in July 2012, with the tour expected to reach Asia, Oceania, South America, along with South Africa and the Middle East sometime in 2013. Although the North American portion of the tour was set to end in January 2013, Bieber announced a second leg; 30 additional dates were added at various venues in the United States and Canada throughout the summer of 2013.

Rehearsals began in late July 2012 at the Long Beach Arena in Long Beach, California. Bieber and his crew would conduct 10-hour rehearsal days. He stated he had a lot to prove with this tour.

The tour was an early success in the United States, with many dates selling out in one hour. The two shows at Madison Square Garden were sold out in 30 seconds. In August, the singer conducted an online search for dancers on the tour.

The tour kicked off in Glendale, Arizona at the Jobing.com Arena. The premiere made headlines for Bieber feeling ill during the show. His performances of "Out of Town Girl" and "Beauty and a Beat" were interrupted as the singer vomited on and off stage.

Justin Bieber reported further troubles during the concert at the Tacoma Dome in Tacoma, Washington. After the show, Bieber tweeted his personal laptop and camera had been stolen during the show. Many fans lashed out against the arena while others believed the incident was a hoax. Three days following the show, Vevo premiered the video for the singer's third single with an opening message: "In October 2012, three hours of personal footage was stolen from musician Justin Bieber. The following footage was illegally uploaded by an anonymous blogger." Many media outlets reported the theft was a hoax to promote the music video. However, the singer's management still affirm property was stolen.

When reflecting on the Believe Tour, Bieber's favorite moment was his introduction when he would come down from the top of the stage in wings, and remain above the audience for about 30 seconds. Bieber explained, "It's going to be such a memorable moment from any tour. I think people will remember that. Coming down right from the beginning of the show, it's me and the wings for about 30 seconds. It's such a big moment. People are just captivated and there's nothing else going on, so that moment is going to bleed into their memory."

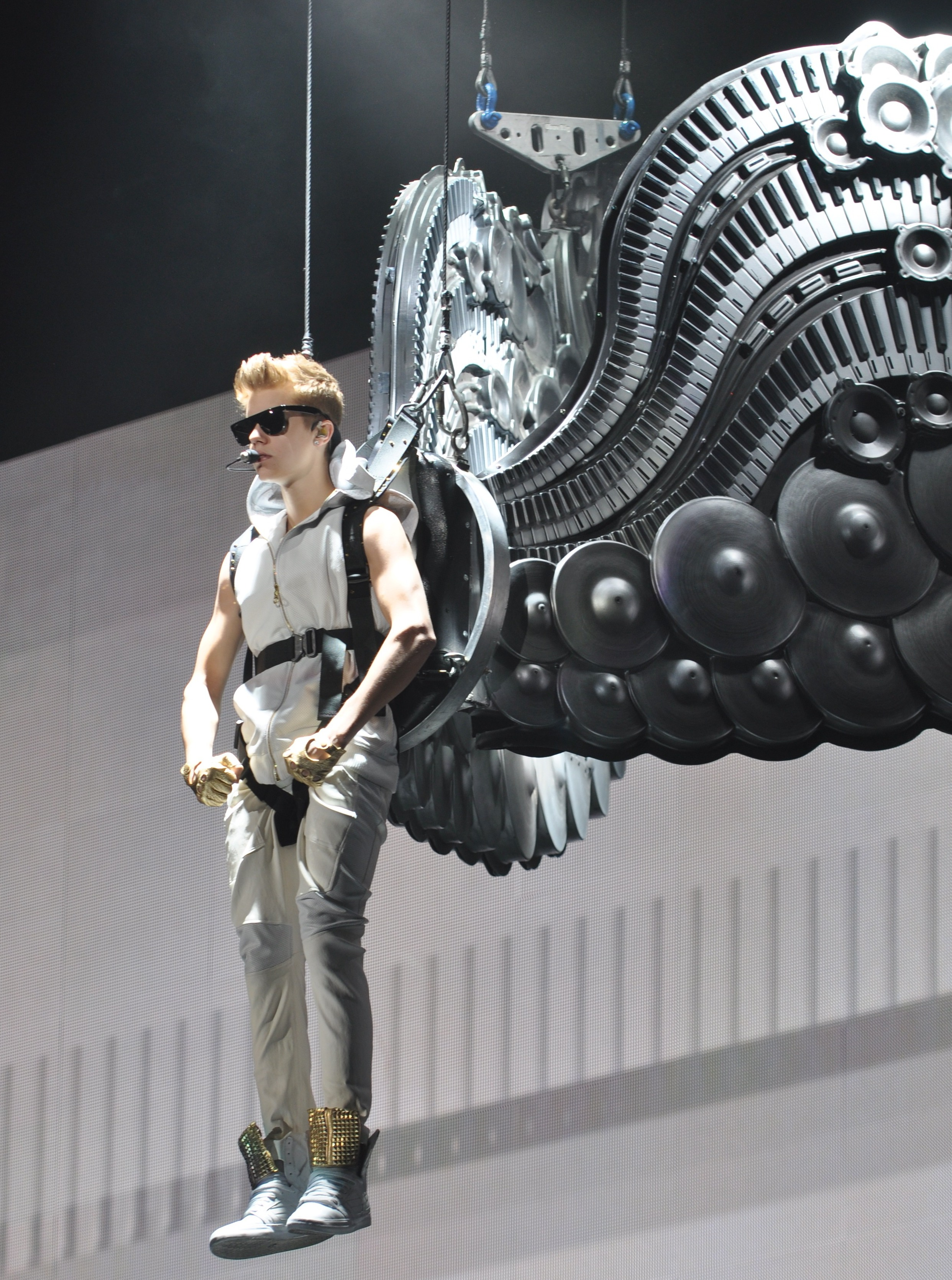
Believe Tour Opening

== Critical response ==
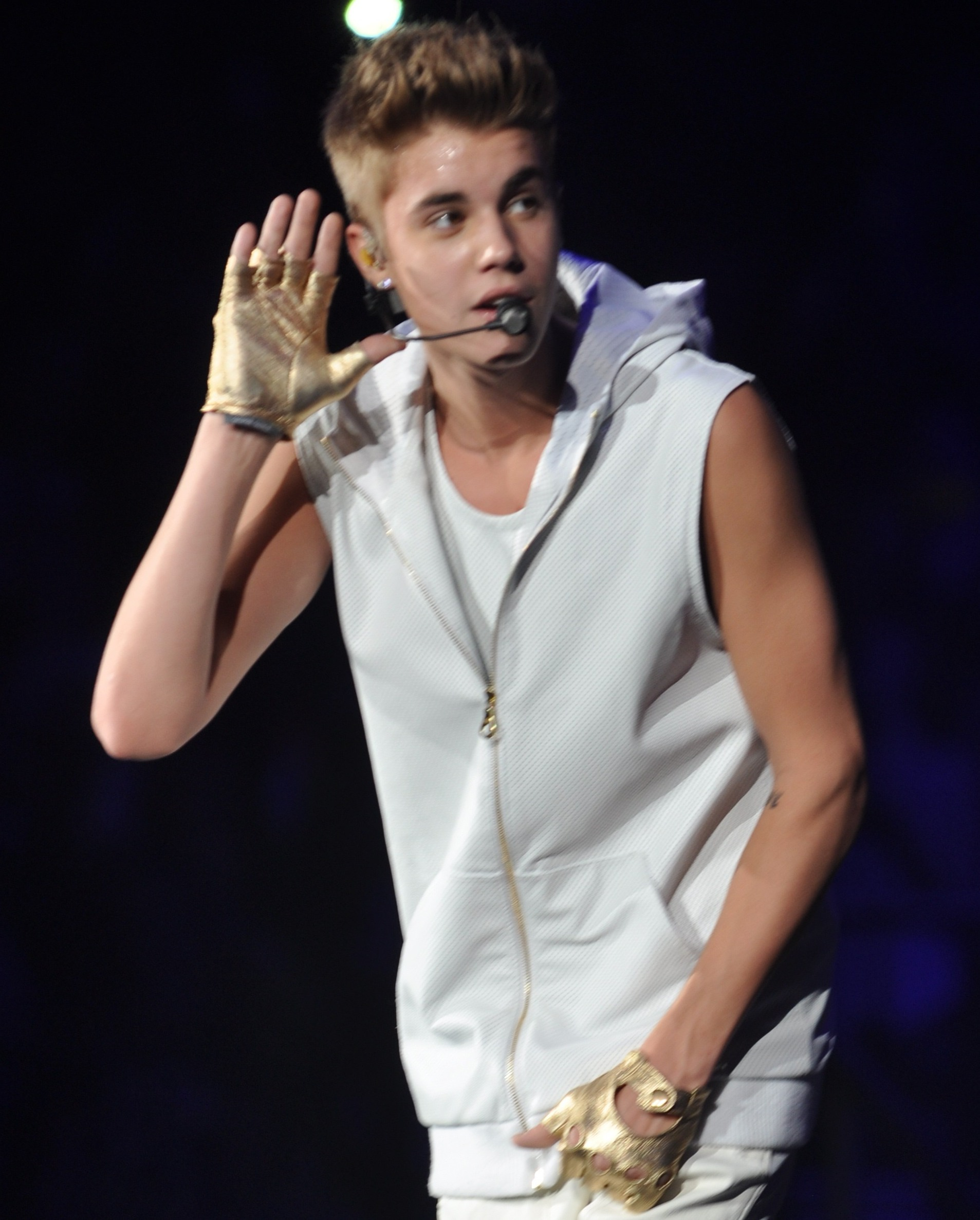
Bieber performing in October 2012

For the tour premiere, Christina Fuoco-Karasinski (SoundSpike) felt his fans still suffered from Bieber Fever until she realized the vast amount of differences among ages. "Bieber, a native of Stratford, Ontario, Canada, provided a show that made the cavernous arena seem intimate. Massive amounts of lasers sliced through the 15,000-seat venue, breaking Jobing.com Arena into several sections."

For the show in Los Angeles, Matt Kivel (Variety) called the show epic yet strangely incoherent. He writes, "Without the pomp and glitz, his talent is unquestionable and the acoustic tracks allowed for a welcome respite from the sensory overload that characterized the evening. [...] His ambition has never been in question, but a greater thematic focus would go a long way toward helping Bieber reach the level of maturity for which he strives."

For the same show, Sophie A. Schillaci (The Hollywood Reporter) says the show is absurd for those outside of Bieber's fanbase. She continues, "Vocally, Bieber shined the most with an acoustic performance of 'Fall', during which he strummed a guitar while propped up high above the stage. Through the rest of his set, which also included a high-energy if way too brief montage of 'One Time', 'Eenie Meenie' and 'Somebody to Love', the singing appeared to take a back seat to the dance moves and pyrotechnics, but audience interaction kept his fans coming back for more."

Peter Hartlaub (San Francisco Chronicle) praised the stage design during the concert at the Oracle Arena. However, the critic also relayed the scripted nature of the production, stating, "Every decision on the night seemed like a calculated part of Bieber's attempt to execute a full Timberlake, and move from preteen deity to full-blown cross-generational pop star." For the concert at the Scotiabank Saddledome, Mike Bell (Calgary Herald) called the show a sensory catnip for tweens. He says, "The almost two-hour concert was so synthetic and filled with fake moments that it was difficult to actually discern what was being sung live and what was Memorex, with most of the songs such as 'All Around the World', 'One Time' and 'Beauty and the Beat' being so stripped of all humanity that they were merely one more element to the flash and bang taking place around it. Only on the odd occasion—songs such as 'Die In Your Arms', the acoustic 'Be Alright' and 'Beautiful', his duet with opener Carly Rae Jepsen—did he show off any real, albeit underwhelming, vocal talent, and even then it was difficult not to look at him and wonder if behind the screens and the curtain, there wasn't a tinman pushing the buttons and counting his money as the clock ticked down"

== Set list ==
This set list is representative of the show in Las Vegas on June 28, 2013. It does not represent all concerts for the duration of the tour.

1. "All Around the World"
2. "Take You"
3. "Catching Feelings"
4. "One Time" / "Eenie Meenie" / "Somebody to Love" (Medley)
5. "Love Me Like You Do"
6. "She Don't Like the Lights"
7. "Die in Your Arms"
8. "Out of Town Girl"
9. "Be Alright"
10. "Fall"
11. "Never Say Never"
12. "Beauty and a Beat"
13. "One Less Lonely Girl"
14. "As Long As You Love Me"
15. "Believe"
16. "Boyfriend"
17. "Baby"

=== Notes ===
- During some of the first shows in North America, Bieber performed "Beautiful" with Carly Rae Jepsen.
- For the tour premiere in Glendale, "Baby" closed the main show, with "Believe" performed during the encore.
- During the performance in Las Vegas, Bieber was joined onstage by Usher to perform "Somebody to Love" and "Yeah!".
- During the performance in Los Angeles, Bieber was joined onstage by Jaden Smith to perform "Never Say Never".
- During the performances in New Jersey and Washington, D.C., Bieber was joined onstage Jaden Smith to perform "Fairytale"
- During the performance in Fresno, Bieber performed "The Divided Sky".
- During the performance in Oakland, Bieber performed "Sand" and "First Tube".
- During the performance in Toronto, Canadian rapper Drake joined Bieber on stage to sing "Right Here" and "The Motto".
- Some of the final shows in South America, Mexico & Oceania; Bieber performed his song All That Matters in acoustic.

== Shows ==
List of concerts, showing date, city, country, venue, opening act, tickets sold, number of available tickets and amount of gross revenue
Date	City	Country	Venue	Opening act	Attendance	Revenue
North America
September 29, 2012	Glendale	United States	Jobing.com Arena	Cody Simpson; Carly Rae Jepsen	13,428 / 13,428	$1,013,460
September 30, 2012	Las Vegas	United States	MGM Grand Garden Arena	Cody Simpson; Carly Rae Jepsen	13,504 / 13,504	$1,076,868
October 2, 2012	Los Angeles	United States	Staples Center	Cody Simpson; Carly Rae Jepsen	27,546 / 27,546	$2,238,937
October 3, 2012	Los Angeles	United States	Staples Center	Cody Simpson; Carly Rae Jepsen	27,546 / 27,546	$2,238,937
October 5, 2012	Fresno	United States	Save Mart Center	Cody Simpson; Carly Rae Jepsen	11,965 / 11,965	$1,323,632
October 6, 2012	Oakland	United States	Oracle Arena	Cody Simpson; Carly Rae Jepsen	14,126 / 14,126	$1,063,978
October 8, 2012	Portland	United States	Rose Garden	Carly Rae Jepsen	14,550 / 14,550	$1,002,495
October 9, 2012	Tacoma	United States	Tacoma Dome	Carly Rae Jepsen	20,259 / 20,259	$1,338,701
October 10, 2012	Vancouver	Canada	Rogers Arena	Carly Rae Jepsen	14,423 / 14,423	$1,215,360
October 12, 2012	Calgary	Canada	Scotiabank Saddledome	Carly Rae Jepsen	13,631 / 13,631	$1,117,440
October 15, 2012	Edmonton	Canada	Rexall Place	Carly Rae Jepsen	13,663 / 13,663	$1,137,620
October 16, 2012	Saskatoon	Canada	Credit Union Centre	Carly Rae Jepsen	13,113 / 13,113	$1,052,590
October 18, 2012	Winnipeg	Canada	MTS Centre	Carly Rae Jepsen	13,326 / 13,326	$1,048,840
October 20, 2012	Minneapolis	United States	Target Center	Carly Rae Jepsen	14,532 / 14,532	$1,071,284
October 21, 2012	Milwaukee	United States	Bradley Center	Carly Rae Jepsen	14,957 / 14,957	$1,065,557
October 23, 2012	Rosemont	United States	Allstate Arena	Carly Rae Jepsen	27,132 / 27,132	$2,125,924
October 24, 2012	Rosemont	United States	Allstate Arena	Carly Rae Jepsen	27,132 / 27,132	$2,125,924
October 26, 2012	Kansas City	United States	Sprint Center	Carly Rae Jepsen	13,972 / 13,972	$1,033,314
October 27, 2012	St. Louis	United States	Scottrade Center	Carly Rae Jepsen	15,034 / 15,034	$1,108,442
October 29, 2012	Dallas	United States	American Airlines Center	Carly Rae Jepsen	14,094 / 14,094	$1,066,183
October 30, 2012	Houston	United States	Toyota Center	Carly Rae Jepsen	13,084 / 13,084	$1,021,718
November 1, 2012	Memphis	United States	FedExForum	Carly Rae Jepsen	13,511 / 13,511	$932,669
November 2, 2012	Louisville	United States	KFC Yum! Center	Carly Rae Jepsen	16,334 / 16,334	$1,158,153
November 4, 2012	Philadelphia	United States	Wells Fargo Center	Carly Rae Jepsen	15,393 / 15,393	$1,247,574
November 5, 2012	Washington, D.C.	United States	Verizon Center	Cody Simpson; Jaden Smith	14,472 / 14,472	$1,169,569
November 9, 2012	East Rutherford	United States	Izod Center	Cody Simpson; Jaden Smith	15,956 / 15,956	$1,233,492
November 10, 2012	Boston	United States	TD Garden	Cody Simpson; Jaden Smith	13,561 / 13,561	$1,087,270
November 12, 2012	New York City	United States	Barclays Center	Cody Simpson; Jaden Smith	14,261 / 14,261	$1,107,390
November 20, 2012	Pittsburgh	United States	Consol Energy Center	—	14,263 / 14,263	$1,029,318
November 21, 2012	Auburn Hills	United States	The Palace of Auburn Hills	Carly Rae Jepsen	15,469 / 15,469	$1,178,456
November 23, 2012	Ottawa	Canada	Scotiabank Place	Carly Rae Jepsen; The Wanted	13,696 / 13,696	$1,104,550
November 26, 2012	Montreal	Canada	Bell Centre	Carly Rae Jepsen; The Wanted	15,870 / 15,870	$1,255,360
November 28, 2012	New York City	United States	Madison Square Garden	Carly Rae Jepsen; The Wanted	29,680 / 29,680	$2,390,196
November 29, 2012	New York City	United States	Madison Square Garden	Carly Rae Jepsen; The Wanted	29,680 / 29,680	$2,390,196
December 1, 2012	Toronto	Canada	Rogers Centre	Carly Rae Jepsen; The Wanted	43,817 / 43,817	$2,671,520
January 5, 2013	Salt Lake City	United States	EnergySolutions Arena	Carly Rae Jepsen	14,693 / 14,693	$1,007,579
January 7, 2013	Denver	United States	Pepsi Center	Carly Rae Jepsen	13,629 / 13,629	$1,015,154
January 9, 2013	Tulsa	United States	BOK Center	Carly Rae Jepsen	12,985 / 12,985	$888,101
January 10, 2013	North Little Rock	United States	Verizon Arena	Carly Rae Jepsen	14,849 / 14,849	$974,452
January 12, 2013	San Antonio	United States	AT&T Center	Carly Rae Jepsen	14,653 / 14,653	$985,153
January 15, 2013	New Orleans	United States	New Orleans Arena	Carly Rae Jepsen; Cody Simpson	13,986 / 13,986	$1,002,620
January 16, 2013	Birmingham	United States	Legacy Arena	Carly Rae Jepsen; Cody Simpson	13,530 / 13,530	$920,078
January 18, 2013	Nashville	United States	Bridgestone Arena	Carly Rae Jepsen; Cody Simpson	14,287 / 14,287	$1,046,887
January 19, 2013	Greensboro	United States	Greensboro Coliseum	Carly Rae Jepsen; Cody Simpson	15,395 / 15,395	$998,126
January 22, 2013	Charlotte	United States	Time Warner Cable Arena	Carly Rae Jepsen; Cody Simpson	15,272 / 15,272	$1,089,601
January 23, 2013	Atlanta	United States	Philips Arena	Carly Rae Jepsen; Cody Simpson	12,686 / 12,686	$995,137
January 25, 2013	Orlando	United States	Amway Center	Carly Rae Jepsen; Cody Simpson	13,355 / 13,355	$1,009,923
January 26, 2013	Miami	United States	American Airlines Arena	Carly Rae Jepsen; Cody Simpson	27,580 / 27,580	$2,178,830
January 27, 2013	Miami	United States	American Airlines Arena	Carly Rae Jepsen; Cody Simpson	27,580 / 27,580	$2,178,830
Europe
February 17, 2013	Dublin	Ireland	The O_{2}	—	14,000 / 14,000	—
February 18, 2013	Dublin	Ireland	The O_{2}	—	14,000 / 14,000	—
February 21, 2013	Manchester	England	Manchester Arena	Carly Rae Jepsen; Cody Simpson	28,678 / 28,678	$2,398,540
February 22, 2013	Manchester	England	Manchester Arena	Carly Rae Jepsen; Cody Simpson	28,678 / 28,678	$2,398,540
February 24, 2013	Liverpool	England	Echo Arena Liverpool	—	—	—
February 27, 2013	Birmingham	England	National Indoor Arena	Cody Simpson	20,619 / 21,690	$1,923,850
February 28, 2013	Birmingham	England	National Indoor Arena	Cody Simpson	20,619 / 21,690	$1,923,850
March 2, 2013	Nottingham	England	National Ice Centre	—	—	—
March 4, 2013	London	England	The O_{2} Arena	Carly Rae Jepsen; Cody Simpson	58,479 / 60,281	$5,053,170
March 5, 2013	London	England	The O_{2} Arena	Carly Rae Jepsen; Cody Simpson	58,479 / 60,281	$5,053,170
March 7, 2013	London	England	The O_{2} Arena	Carly Rae Jepsen; Cody Simpson	58,479 / 60,281	$5,053,170
March 8, 2013	London	England	The O_{2} Arena	Carly Rae Jepsen; Cody Simpson	58,479 / 60,281	$5,053,170
March 11, 2013	Lisbon	Portugal	Pavilhão Atlântico	Carly Rae Jepsen	—	—
March 14, 2013	Madrid	Spain	Palacio de los Deportes	Carly Rae Jepsen	—	—
March 16, 2013	Barcelona	Spain	Palau Sant Jordi	Carly Rae Jepsen	—	—
March 19, 2013	Paris	France	Palais Omnisports de Paris-Bercy	Carly Rae Jepsen	—	—
March 22, 2013	Zürich	Switzerland	Hallenstadion	Carly Rae Jepsen; Cody Simpson	13,000 / 13,000	$1,364,500
March 23, 2013	Bologna	Italy	Unipol Arena	Carly Rae Jepsen	—	—
March 25, 2013	Łódź	Poland	Atlas Arena	Honorata Skarbek	—	—
March 28, 2013	Munich	Germany	Olympiahalle	—	—	—
March 30, 2013	Vienna	Austria	Wiener Stadthalle	—	—	—
March 31, 2013	Berlin	Germany	O_{2} World Berlin	Neon Dogs	9,475 / 13,289	$810,632
April 2, 2013	Hamburg	Germany	O_{2} World Hamburg	Neon Dogs	9,204 / 12,984	$871,682
April 3, 2013	Frankfurt	Germany	Festhalle Frankfurt	—	—	—
April 5, 2013	Dortmund	Germany	Westfalenhallen	—	—	—
April 6, 2013	Cologne	Germany	Lanxess Arena	—	—	—
April 8, 2013	Strasbourg	France	Zénith de Strasbourg	—	—	—
April 10, 2013	Antwerp	Belgium	Sportpaleis	3M8S	35,751 / 36,939	$2,598,300
April 11, 2013	Antwerp	Belgium	Sportpaleis	3M8S	35,751 / 36,939	$2,598,300
April 13, 2013	Arnhem	Netherlands	GelreDome XS	MainStreet	—	—
April 16, 2013	Oslo	Norway	Telenor Arena	—	69,246 / 71,091	$7,887,802
April 17, 2013	Oslo	Norway	Telenor Arena	—	69,246 / 71,091	$7,887,802
April 18, 2013	Oslo	Norway	Telenor Arena	—	69,246 / 71,091	$7,887,802
April 20, 2013	Copenhagen	Denmark	Telia Parken	—	—	—
April 22, 2013	Stockholm	Sweden	Ericsson Globe	—	—	—
April 23, 2013	Stockholm	Sweden	Ericsson Globe	—	—	—
April 24, 2013	Stockholm	Sweden	Ericsson Globe	—	—	—
April 26, 2013	Helsinki	Finland	Hartwall Arena	—	—	—
April 28, 2013	Saint Petersburg	Russia	SKK Peterburgsky	—	—	—
April 30, 2013	Moscow	Russia	Olimpiyskiy	—	—	—
May 2, 2013	Istanbul	Turkey	İTÜ Stadyumu	—	—	—
Asia
May 4, 2013	Dubai	United Arab Emirates	The Sevens Stadium	—	28,544 / 46,850	$7,773,419
May 5, 2013	Dubai	United Arab Emirates	The Sevens Stadium	—	28,544 / 46,850	$7,773,419
Africa
May 8, 2013	Cape Town	South Africa	Cape Town Stadium	—	—	—
May 12, 2013	Johannesburg	South Africa	FNB Stadium	—	—	—
North America
June 22, 2013	San Diego	United States	Valley View Casino Center	Hot Chelle Rae; Mike Posner	10,832 / 10,832	$915,852
June 24, 2013	Los Angeles	United States	Staples Center	Hot Chelle Rae; Mike Posner	27,994 / 27,994	$2,307,566
June 25, 2013	Los Angeles	United States	Staples Center	Hot Chelle Rae; Mike Posner	27,994 / 27,994	$2,307,566
June 26, 2013	San Jose	United States	HP Pavilion	Hot Chelle Rae; Mike Posner	12,996 / 12,996	$1,082,050
June 28, 2013	Las Vegas	United States	MGM Grand Garden Arena	Hot Chelle Rae; Mike Posner	13,362 / 13,362	$1,103,893
June 30, 2013	Denver	United States	Pepsi Center	Hot Chelle Rae; Mike Posner	12,885 / 12,885	$1,022,453
July 2, 2013	Oklahoma City	United States	Chesapeake Energy Arena	Hot Chelle Rae; Mike Posner	12,209 / 12,209	$973,740
July 3, 2013	Dallas	United States	American Airlines Center	Hot Chelle Rae; Mike Posner	13,945 / 13,945	$1,141,555
July 6, 2013	Omaha	United States	CenturyLink Center	Hot Chelle Rae; Mike Posner	14,109 / 14,109	$1,090,542
July 7, 2013	Des Moines	United States	Wells Fargo Arena	Hot Chelle Rae; Mike Posner	13,108 / 13,108	$1,040,329
July 9, 2013	Chicago	United States	United Center	Hot Chelle Rae; Mike Posner	14,574 / 14,574	$1,198,621
July 10, 2013	Indianapolis	United States	Bankers Life Fieldhouse	Hot Chelle Rae; Mike Posner	14,088 / 14,088	$1,091,325
July 12, 2013	Columbus	United States	Nationwide Arena	Hot Chelle Rae; Mike Posner	14,002 / 14,002	$1,101,544
July 13, 2013	Cleveland	United States	Quicken Loans Arena	Hot Chelle Rae; Mike Posner	15,084 / 15,084	$1,148,356
July 15, 2013	Buffalo	United States	First Niagara Center	Hot Chelle Rae; Mike Posner	14,789 / 14,789	$1,148,023
July 17, 2013	Philadelphia	United States	Wells Fargo Center	Hot Chelle Rae; Mike Posner	15,065 / 15,065	$1,243,009
July 18, 2013	Hartford	United States	XL Center	Hot Chelle Rae; Mike Posner	12,404 / 12,404	$1,032,636
July 20, 2013	Boston	United States	TD Garden	Hot Chelle Rae; Mike Posner	13,450 / 13,450	$1,123,874
July 23, 2013	Ottawa	Canada	Scotiabank Place	Hot Chelle Rae; Mike Posner	13,741 / 13,741	$1,102,540
July 25, 2013	Toronto	Canada	Air Canada Centre	Hot Chelle Rae; Mike Posner	29,153 / 29,153	$2,398,100
July 26, 2013	Toronto	Canada	Air Canada Centre	Hot Chelle Rae; Mike Posner	29,153 / 29,153	$2,398,100
July 28, 2013	Detroit	United States	Joe Louis Arena	Hot Chelle Rae; Mike Posner	15,148 / 15,148	$1,208,287
July 30, 2013	Newark	United States	Prudential Center	Hot Chelle Rae; Mike Posner	26,824 / 26,824	$2,211,502
July 31, 2013	Newark	United States	Prudential Center	Hot Chelle Rae; Mike Posner	26,824 / 26,824	$2,211,502
August 2, 2013	Brooklyn	United States	Barclays Center	Hot Chelle Rae; Mike Posner	14,587 / 14,587	$1,207,640
August 3, 2013	Washington, D.C.	United States	Verizon Center	Hot Chelle Rae; Mike Posner	14,647 / 14,647	$1,203,291
August 5, 2013	Columbia	United States	Colonial Life Arena	Hot Chelle Rae; Mike Posner	12,540 / 12,540	$996,246
August 7, 2013	Jacksonville	United States	Jacksonville Veterans Memorial Arena	Ariana Grande; Cody Simpson	11,526 / 11,526	$936,990
August 8, 2013	Tampa	United States	Tampa Bay Times Forum	Ariana Grande; Cody Simpson	14,099 / 14,099	$1,101,576
August 10, 2013	Atlanta	United States	Philips Arena	Ariana Grande; Cody Simpson	12,407 / 12,407	$1,019,885
Asia
September 23, 2013 (Note: The September 23, 2013 concert in Singapore at the Marina Bay Street Circuit was a part of the 2013 Singapore Grand Prix.)	Marina Bay	Singapore	Marina Bay Street Circuit	—		—
September 26, 2013	Bangkok	Thailand	Challenger Hall 3	—	10,000 / 10,000	—
September 29, 2013	Beijing	China	MasterCard Center	—		—
October 2, 2013	Dalian	China	Dalian Arena	—		—
October 5, 2013	Shanghai	China	Mercedes-Benz Arena	—		—
October 7, 2013	Saitama	Japan	Saitama Super Arena	—		—
October 10, 2013	Seoul	South Korea	Olympic Gymnastics Arena	—		—
October 12, 2013	Cotai	Macau	Cotai Arena	—		—
Latin America
October 19, 2013	San Juan	Puerto Rico	Coliseo de Puerto Rico	—	13,674 / 13,674	$1,707,044
October 22, 2013	Santo Domingo	Dominican Republic	Estadio Olímpico Félix Sánchez	—	11,321 / 21,850	$941,883
October 24, 2013	Panama City	Panama	Estadio Rommel Fernández	—	—	—
October 26, 2013	Guatemala City	Guatemala	Estadio Cementos Progreso	—	8,851 / 18,500	$941,883
October 29, 2013	Bogotá	Colombia	Estadio El Campín	Paty Cantú	—	—
October 31, 2013	Quito	Ecuador	Estadio Olímpico Atahualpa	—	18,962 / 27,000	$2,481,840
November 2, 2013	São Paulo	Brazil	Arena Anhembi	P9	31,922 / 33,374	$3,266,480
November 3, 2013	Rio de Janeiro	Brazil	Praça da Apoteose	—	22,598 / 33,199	$2,460,450
November 6, 2013	Asunción	Paraguay	Hipódromo de Asunción	—	11,325 / 22,780	$1,228,090
November 8, 2013 (Note: The concerts on November 8, November 9, and November 10 in Córdoba and Buenos Aires were a part of the Z Festival.)	Córdoba	Argentina	Estadio Mario Alberto Kempes	Cody Simpson; Carly Rae Jepsen; Owl City	23,565 / 34,328	$2,633,870
November 9, 2013	Buenos Aires	Argentina	River Plate Stadium	Cody Simpson; Carly Rae Jepsen; Owl City	—	—
November 12, 2013	Santiago	Chile	Estadio Nacional	Carly Rae Jepsen; Owl City	47,969 / 52,300	$4,948,320
November 18, 2013	Mexico City	Mexico	Foro Sol	—	98,358 / 107,746	$6,999,860
November 19, 2013	Mexico City	Mexico	Foro Sol	—	98,358 / 107,746	$6,999,860
Oceania
November 23, 2013	Auckland	New Zealand	Vector Arena	Cody Simpson	—	—
November 26, 2013	Brisbane	Australia	Brisbane Entertainment Centre	Cody Simpson	13,263 / 19,960	$1,655,360
November 27, 2013	Brisbane	Australia	Brisbane Entertainment Centre	Cody Simpson	13,263 / 19,960	$1,655,360
November 29, 2013	Sydney	Australia	Allphones Arena	Cody Simpson	22,911 / 24,566	$2,946,530
November 30, 2013	Sydney	Australia	Allphones Arena	Cody Simpson	22,911 / 24,566	$2,946,530
December 2, 2013	Melbourne	Australia	Rod Laver Arena	Cody Simpson	22,543 / 23,925	$2,706,030
December 3, 2013	Melbourne	Australia	Rod Laver Arena	Cody Simpson	22,543 / 23,925	$2,706,030
December 5, 2013	Adelaide	Australia	Adelaide Entertainment Arena	Cody Simpson	—	—
December 8, 2013	Perth	Australia	Perth Arena	Cody Simpson	10,732 / 11,087	$1,376,970
Total					1,694,897 / 1,771,355 (96%)	$149,785,753

== Cancelled shows ==
List of cancelled concerts, showing date, city, country, venue and reason for cancellation
Date	City	Country	Venue	Reason
February 23, 2013	Sheffield	England	Motorpoint Arena Sheffield	Scheduling conflicts
March 12, 2013	Lisbon	Portugal	Pavilhão Atlântico	Unforeseen circumstances
March 14, 2013	Bilbao	Spain	Bizkaia Arena	Logistical problems
March 25, 2013	Lyon	France	Halle Tony Garnier	Scheduling conflicts
May 6, 2013	Muscat	Oman	Al-Wattayah Stadium	Unknown
November 10, 2013	Buenos Aires	Argentina	River Plate Stadium	Suffered food poisoning in the middle of the show
November 24, 2013	Auckland	New Zealand	Vector Arena	Unforeseen circumstances
