= Right Here (Justin Bieber song) =

Single by Justin Bieber featuring Drake

from the album Believe
- Released: February 5, 2013
- Genre: Pop; R&B; soul
- Length: 3:24
- Label: Island; RBMG; Schoolboy
- Songwriters: Justin Bieber; Aubrey Graham; Chauncey Hollis; Eric Bellinger; Greg Haylett
- Producer: Hit-Boy

Justin Bieber singles chronology
"Beauty and a Beat" (2012)	"Right Here" (2013)	"All Around the World" (2013)

Drake singles chronology
"Love Me" (2013)	"Right Here" (2013)	"Started from the Bottom" (2013)

Lyric video
- "Right Here" on YouTube

"Right Here" is a song recorded by Canadian singer-songwriter Justin Bieber featuring Canadian rapper Drake, released on February 5, 2013, as the fourth single from the former's third studio album Believe (2012). It was written by the artists alongside Eric Bellinger, and producer Hit-Boy. A lyric video was posted onto Bieber's YouTube channel in February 2013, and he performed the song live as part of his worldwide Believe Tour in 2012-13.

== Background ==
Bieber and Drake had been friends for several years prior to collaborating on "Right Here", with Drake appearing in the music video for Baby in 2010, And the two performing together at the Indianapolis State Fair in the same year. A collaboration between the two Canadian artists was first teased in September 2010 when they both attended the MTV VMAs together, and in an interview Bieber teased his next studio album, saying "Drake is gonna be on that album", and Drake backing that up with "we'll make it happen".

The collaboration finally came about two years later in 2012, with Bieber revealing the track on Capital FM on April 24 of that year. He said "The song's called 'Right Here' and it's a smash! It just rides so smoothly, It's me and Drake, so it's good."

Bieber's manager Scooter Braun stating "The Drake thing is something he and Drake have been talking about for like two years," Braun said. "And then they finally went into the studio, and they wrote that song together. ... I'm glad that 'Right Here' came about. ... Drake was like, 'I don't want to do just a rap song. I want to sing with you, do a song for the ladies.' Everyone seems to love that song."

One of the track's songwriters, Eric Bellinger, mentioned that during the recording process Bieber had requested for a table to be moved into the booth, right underneath the microphone. Bieber then used the table and his hands to create the drum pattern that was used in the track. Bellinger said "Justin, at that point, was just at a point in his life where he was fearless... and I think, as creators, the greatness comes when you're fearless".

== Lyric video ==
A lyric video for the song was uploaded on Bieber's official VEVO account on February 26, 2013.

== Charts ==
Chart performance
Chart (2012–2013)	Peak position
Slovakia Airplay (ČNS IFPI)	57
UK Singles (Official Charts)	125
UK Hip Hop/R&B (Official Charts)	30
US Billboard Hot 100	95
US Hot R&B/Hip-Hop Songs (Billboard)	36
US Rhythmic Airplay (Billboard)	16

== Certifications ==
Certifications
Region	Certification	Certified units/sales
New Zealand (RMNZ)	Platinum	30,000^{‡}
United Kingdom (BPI)	Silver	200,000^{‡}
United States (RIAA)	Gold	500,000^{‡}
^{‡} Sales+streaming figures based on certification alone.
