= List of number-one albums of 2012 (Spain) =

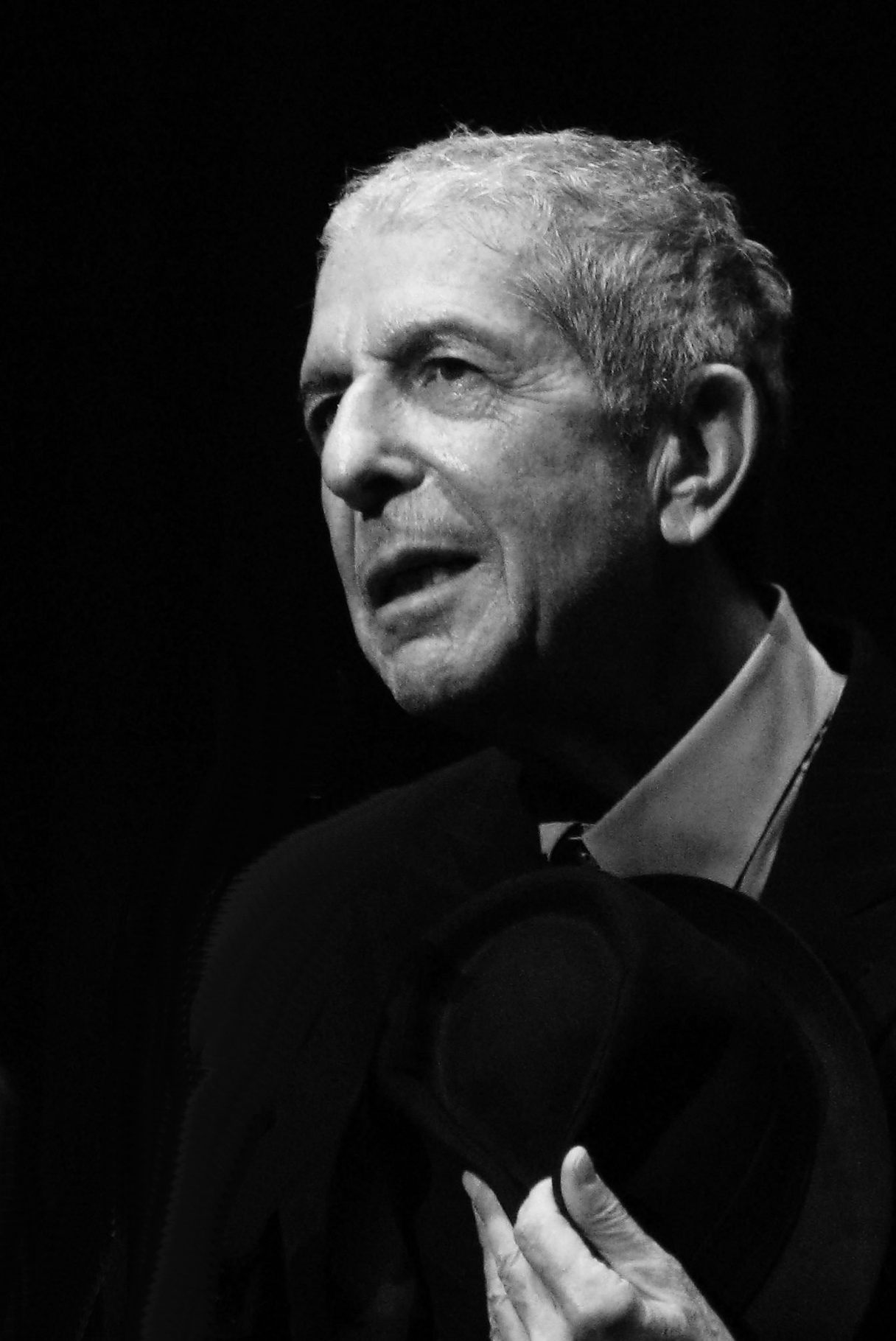
Canadian singer-songwriter Leonard Cohen became the oldest artist to ever have an album top the Spanish charts in its debut week with the release of his twelfth studio album Old Ideas.

Top 100 España is a record chart published weekly by PROMUSICAE (Productores de Música de España), a non-profit organization composed by Spain and multinational record companies. This association tracks record sales (physical and digital) in Spain.

== Albums ==
Chart date	Album	Artist(s)	Reference(s)
January 8	En Acústico	Pablo Alborán	
January 15	En Acústico	Pablo Alborán	
January 22	Habla	Manuel Carrasco	
January 29	Habla	Manuel Carrasco	
February 5	Old Ideas	Leonard Cohen	
February 12	La Orquesta del Titanic	Serrat & Sabina	
February 19	La Orquesta del Titanic	Serrat & Sabina	
February 26	La Orquesta del Titanic	Serrat & Sabina	
March 4	La Orquesta del Titanic	Serrat & Sabina	
March 11	Wrecking Ball	Bruce Springsteen	
March 18	Wrecking Ball	Bruce Springsteen	
March 25	Wrecking Ball	Bruce Springsteen	
April 1	MDNA	Madonna	
April 8	En Acústico	Pablo Alborán	
April 15	En Acústico	Pablo Alborán	
April 22	En Acústico	Pablo Alborán	
April 29	En Acústico	Pablo Alborán	
May 6	En Acústico	Pablo Alborán	
May 13	Todo Empieza y Todo Acaba en Ti	Ismael Serrano	
May 20	En Acústico	Pablo Alborán	
May 27	La Noche Eterna. Los Días No Vividos	Love of Lesbian	
June 3	En Acústico	Pablo Alborán	
June 10	En Acústico	Pablo Alborán	
June 17	En Acústico	Pablo Alborán	
June 24	Believe	Justin Bieber	
July 1	Believe	Justin Bieber	
July 8	En Acústico	Pablo Alborán	
July 15	En Acústico	Pablo Alborán	
July 22	En Acústico	Pablo Alborán	
July 29	En Acústico	Pablo Alborán	
August 5	En Acústico	Pablo Alborán	
August 12	En Acústico	Pablo Alborán	
August 19	En Acústico	Pablo Alborán	
August 26	En Acústico	Pablo Alborán	
September 2	Exiliados en la Bahía: Lo Mejor de Maná	Maná	
September 9	Papitwo	Miguel Bosé	
September 16	Papitwo	Miguel Bosé	
September 23	Papitwo	Miguel Bosé	
September 30	La Música No Se Toca	Alejandro Sanz	
October 7	La Música No Se Toca	Alejandro Sanz	
October 14	La Música No Se Toca	Alejandro Sanz	
October 21	La Música No Se Toca	Alejandro Sanz	
October 28	La Música No Se Toca	Alejandro Sanz	
November 4	El Ritmo de las Olas	Andy & Lucas	
November 11	Tanto	Pablo Alborán	
November 18	Tanto	Pablo Alborán	
November 25	Tanto	Pablo Alborán	
December 2	Tanto	Pablo Alborán	
December 9	Tanto	Pablo Alborán	
December 16	Tanto	Pablo Alborán	
December 23	Tanto	Pablo Alborán	
December 30	Tanto	Pablo Alborán	
