= All Around the World (Justin Bieber song) =

2013 single by Justin Bieber featuring Ludacris

Single by Justin Bieber featuring Ludacris

from the album Believe
- Released: February 26, 2013
- Genre: Eurodance
- Length: 4:04
- Label: Island; RBMG; School Boy
- Songwriters: Justin Bieber; Nasri Atweh; Adam Messinger; Nolan Lambroza; Christopher Bridges
- Producers: The Messengers; Sir Nolan; Kuk Harrell

Justin Bieber singles chronology
"Right Here" (2013)	"All Around the World" (2013)	"#thatPower" (2013)

Ludacris singles chronology
"Rest of My Life" (2012)	"All Around the World" (2013)	"Party Girls" (2014)

Music video
- "All Around the World" on YouTube

"All Around the World" is a song by Canadian singer Justin Bieber featuring American rapper Ludacris, from the former's third studio album, Believe (2012). It was written by the artists alongside Sir Nolan and Nasri of The Messengers. The song is the second collaboration between Bieber and Ludacris, having previously collaborated on "Baby" (2010). It was first released on June 4, 2012, as a promotional single from the album. The song was released as the fourth international single, and the fifth and final US single on February 26, 2013. The Eurodance track features a similar instrumentation to songs by Britney Spears, Chris Brown and Usher. Lyrically, it features Bieber singing to his love interest that "all around the world, people want to be loved". "All Around the World" received critical acclaim from music critics, who welcomed the song's Eurodance style. The song had moderate success worldwide, reaching the top ten in several countries, such as Belgium, Canada and Norway. Bieber promoted the song through live performances and a music video.

== Background and composition ==
"All Around the World"
A 24-second sample of the song's chorus features Bieber singing over a dance background which incorporates heavy synths similar to the work of Britney Spears, Chris Brown and Usher.

In late 2011, Bieber confirmed to radio network Capital FM that he was recording material for his third studio album, which was originally going to be released in early 2012. He later spoke to MTV News and revealed that Believe would surprise people in different ways, since it is musically a departure from his previous works. "All Around the World" was written and produced by The Messengers and Nolan Lambroza, while Bieber and Ludacris wrote additional lyrics. On May 25, 2012, an unmastered version of the track leaked online. The cover art for the promotional single was unveiled on June 4, 2012, and features Bieber holding an acoustic guitar over his shoulder, standing on the surface of the world, while the moon is glowing behind him. The same day, the track was released on iTunes Store through The Island Def Jam Music Group. The song was later released as the fourth international single, and the fifth and final US single on February 26, 2013.

It is a Eurodance song, which incorporates heavy synth-pop elements in its instrumentation and is similar to previous works by producer David Guetta. Contemporary critics compared the track to Britney Spears' "Till the World Ends" (2011) and Chris Brown's "Beautiful People" (2011). Lyrically, Bieber sings for his love interest and says that "all around the world, people want to be loved". The track opens with he singing, "You're beautiful, beautiful/You should know it/I think it's time, think it's time/That you show it", lines that were compared to One Direction's "What Makes You Beautiful" (2011). As the track follows, Bieber encourages girls to release their inner beauty: "Light it up, so explosive/Why you acting so shy, holding back/DJ bring that back." During the rap section, Ludacris references their previous collaboration on "Baby" (2010), saying, "Once again, the dynamic duo is back at it!/ JB, Ludacris!/ I love everything about you/ You're imperfectly perfect/ Everyone's itching for beauty/But they're just scratching the surface."

== Reception ==
=== Critical response ===
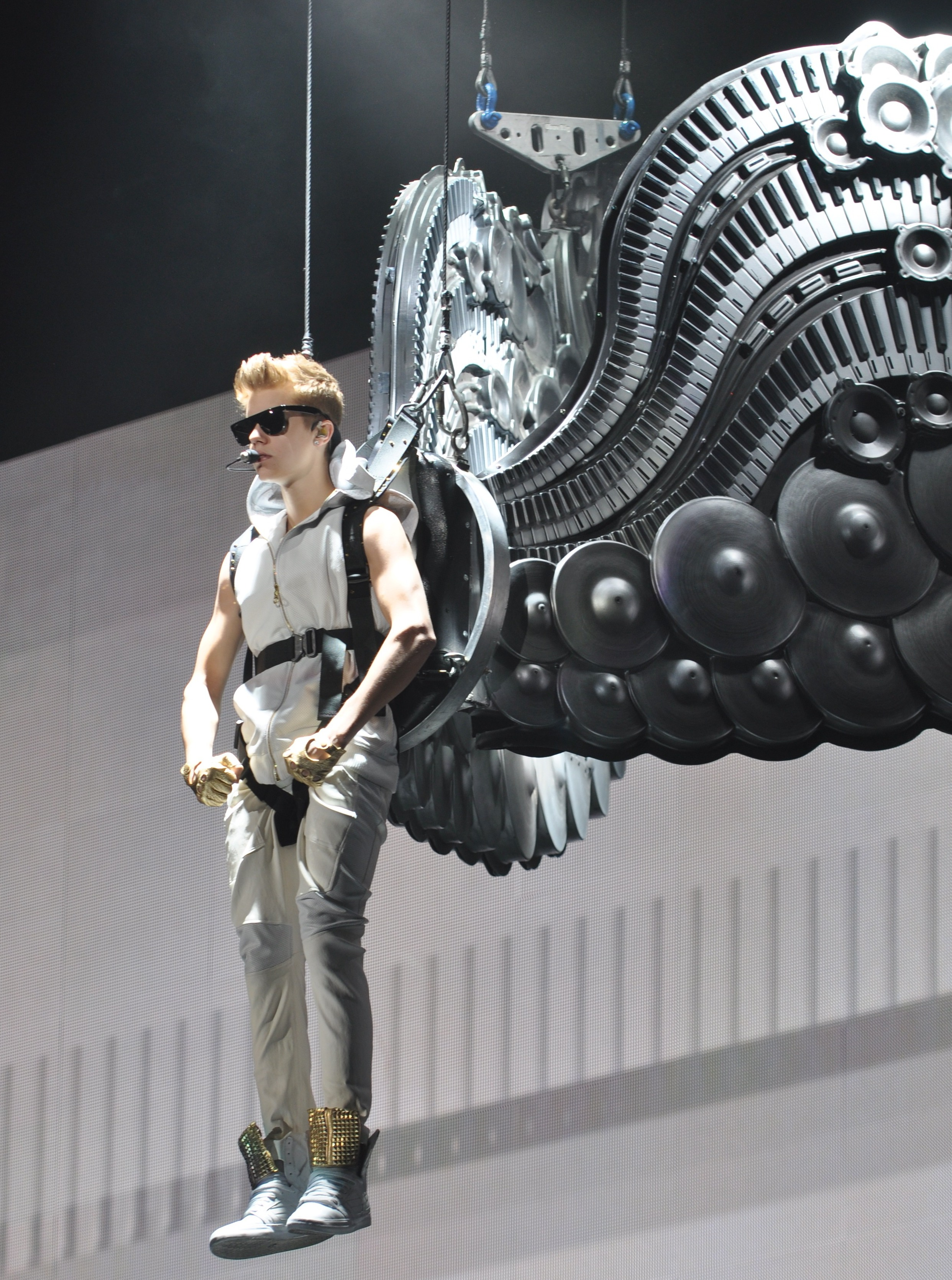
Bieber performing "All Around the World" during his Believe Tour in October 2012.

"All Around the World" received mostly positive reviews from music critics. Jenna Rubenstein of MTV thought that the "fist-pumping club banger" is a complete departure from Bieber's previous work, while Diadem Pambid of the International Business Times stated that the singer joined the "'synth-pop' bandwagon" along with Britney Spears, Chris Brown and Usher. Jocelyn Vena also of MTV stated that the song could have been recorded by Usher, due to its "grinding, fist-pumping" background. Entertainment Weekly columnist Ray Rahman gave "All Around the World" a positive review, and stated: "a Euro beat worthy of The Wanted? The vocal swagger of Chris Brown? Lyrics smacking of One Direction? Check, check, and check, please!" Rick Florino of Artistdirect rated "All Around the World" five out of five stars, and commented that the track is not only a sequel to "Baby", but is also "a whole new level for pop itself." Becky Bain of Idolator explained that the song is a good example of how Bieber is taking "baby steps to 'swaggy' adulthood through the evolution of his music — keep the content G-Rated, but make the beat something the older club-going crowd can enjoy. So far, it's working." Amy Sciaretto of Pop Crush gave the track a mixed review, and deemed it as highly similar to the work of Spears, stating: "If you told us this song was penned for Britney Spears for her last album Femme Fatale, we'd Believe it, because the computerized style and the thick vocal effects remind us of recent Brit material. It's safe to say that 'All Around the World' is a club banger. And while we love Bieber, it's not our favorite song on Believe so far."

=== Chart performance ===
In the United States, "All Around the World" debuted at its peak number 22 on the Billboard Hot 100 chart on June 23, 2012, becoming the week's best-debuting single. On the Pop Songs chart, it peaked at number 19. On the Canadian Hot 100, it peaked at number ten. "All Around the World" debuted on the UK Singles Chart at its peak of number 30, for the week ending June 16, 2012. In Denmark, it debuted at its peak of number seven, remaining five weeks on the chart. On the Norwegian Singles Chart, it peaked at number three. "All Around the World" debuted at number 56 on Sweden's national singles chart, later peaking at number 41 and then fell out after two weeks. The track also peaked at number 34 in Australia and 15 in New Zealand, lasting for two weeks in both countries.

== Music video ==
The official video was premiered on April 12, 2013. "Blessed and grateful to do what i do #AllAroundTheWorld. Thanks", he wrote linking to the video. It is a "tour video" which is entirely composed of Bieber showing his point of view while he is touring the world and is largely based on his performance over Mexico City. It also illustrates vistas from the places he visited and documents national monuments including the Elizabeth Tower, the Eiffel Tower, the Sydney Opera House, Taj Mahal, Giza pyramid complex, the Colosseum and Christ the Redeemer statue in Brazil. Ludacris, joins Bieber in the video during the rap portion of the song. It also included images of the singer posing with fans, and others crying and screaming for him.

Nardine Saad from Los Angeles Times noted that the video "briefly makes us sympathetic toward the Biebs and his eyebrow-raising behavior this last year, which has included speeding, possibly smoking pot and frequently walking around shirtless" and named the fans' part "memorable". The same noted Ryan Seacrest's website, saying "proves that no matter where he goes, there will always be plenty of fans to support him". Entertainment Weekly notes that it "show off Justin Bieber in an all-white suit and in a leather-jacket outfit. Ludacris appears for a guest-verse, indicating that this may all be a stealth prequel to Fast & Furious 6". Idolator's Christina Lee described the video as "flashy" and wrote that it "offers a rose-colored view of his superstar status".

== Live performances ==
Bieber performed "All Around the World" at the Capital FM Summertime Ball 2012. For the performance, he sported fingerless gloves, a Union Jack tank with matching vest, and jeans. The singer also performed the track during a promotional concert in Europe on June 4, 2012, along with "Boyfriend" and "Die in Your Arms". Bieber also performed "All Around the World" and "Boyfriend" at the 2012 MuchMusic Video Awards on June 17. The song is also used as Bieber's 2012–13 Believe Tour's opening song. Entering from the upper portion of the arena, Bieber was lowered onto the center of the stage wearing a massive pair of charcoal-colored wings. He was quickly joined by a troupe of male backing dancers as the song was played. Fireworks exploded, laser lights shot wildly from the ceiling, confetti fell to the floor and plumes of smoke were released from the bottom of the stage. Sophie A. Schillaci from The Hollywood Reporter gave a negative review for the performance and wrote that "if you can move past Justin Bieber's bizarre stage entrance, flying in on a set of ginormous metal wings to the tune of 'All Around the World', it's hard not to smile at his show".

== Charts ==
Chart (2012–2013)	Peak position
Australia (ARIA)	34
Austria (Ö3 Austria Top 40)	67
Belgium (Ultratop 50 Flanders)	48
Belgium (Ultratip Bubbling Under Wallonia)	4
Belgium Dance (Ultratop Wallonia)	34
Canada Hot 100 (Billboard)	10
Canada CHR/Top 40 (Billboard)	33
Denmark (Tracklisten)	7
France (SNEP)	63
Germany (GfK)	53
Ireland (IRMA)	31
Italy (Musica e Dischi)	49
Japan Hot 100 (Billboard)	78
Mexico (Billboard Mexican Airplay)	43
Mexico Anglo (Monitor Latino)	20
Netherlands (Single Top 100)	52
New Zealand (Recorded Music NZ)	15
Norway (VG-lista)	3
Spain (Promusicae)	35
Sweden (Sverigetopplistan)	41
UK Singles (OCC)	30
US Billboard Hot 100	22
US Pop Airplay (Billboard)	19
US Rhythmic Airplay (Billboard)	39

=== Year-end charts ===
Chart (2012)	Position
Brazil (Crowley)	87

== Certifications ==
Region	Certification	Certified units/sales
Australia (ARIA)	Platinum	70,000^{‡}
Brazil (Pro-Música Brasil)	Platinum	60,000^{‡}
Canada (Music Canada)	Platinum	80,000^{*}
Mexico (AMPROFON)	Gold	30,000^{*}
New Zealand (RMNZ)	Gold	7,500^{*}
Norway (IFPI Norway)	Platinum	10,000^{*}
United States (RIAA)	Platinum	1,000,000^{‡}
Streaming
Denmark (IFPI Danmark)	Platinum	1,800,000^{†}
^{*} Sales figures based on certification alone.^{‡} Sales+streaming figures based on certification alone.^{†} Streaming-only figures based on certification alone.

== Release history ==
Region	Date	Format	Label
Worldwide	June 4, 2012	Digital download – promotional single	IDJMG
United States	February 26, 2013	Contemporary hit radio	IDJMG
United Kingdom	April 1, 2013	Contemporary hit radio	IDJMG
United States	April 23, 2013	Rhythmic contemporary	IDJMG
