= Believe (Justin Bieber album) =

Studio album by Justin Bieber
- Released: June 15, 2012
- Genres: Pop; R&B; EDM
- Length: 48:09
- Labels: Island; RBMG; Schoolboy
- Producers: Adam Messinger; Nasri; Nolan Lambrozza; Mike Posner; Mason "MdL" Levy; Rodney "Darkchild" Jerkins; Andre Lindal; The Pentagon; Patrick "j.Que" Smith; SoFly & Nius; Hit-Boy; Jacob Luttrell; Dennis "Aganee" Jenkins; Travis Sayles; Ariel Rechtshaid; Diplo; Max Martin; Zedd; Bei Maejor; Justin Bieber; Dan Kanter; Harv & S; Soundz

Justin Bieber chronology
Under the Mistletoe (2011)	Believe (2012)	Believe Acoustic (2013)

Singles from Believe
- 1. "Boyfriend" Released: March 26, 2012; 2. "As Long as You Love Me" Released: July 10, 2012; 3. "Beauty and a Beat" Released: October 24, 2012; 4. "Right Here" Released: February 5, 2013; 5. "All Around the World" Released: February 26, 2013

Believe is the third studio album by the Canadian singer Justin Bieber, released on June 15, 2012, by Island Records. Looking to transition from the teen pop styles of his two-piece debut effort My World (2009) and My World 2.0 (2010), Bieber opted to create a follow-up record that featured more prominent elements of Eurohouse, dance-pop and contemporary R&B. As executive producers, mentor Usher and manager Scooter Braun enlisted collaborators including Darkchild, Hit-Boy, Diplo and Max Martin with the intention of creating a mature-sounding project.

Upon its release, Believe received generally favorable reviews from music critics, who appreciated its progression from Bieber's earlier works. It debuted at number one on the US Billboard 200 albums chart with first-week sales of 374,000 copies, and was later certified Platinum by the Recording Industry Association of America (RIAA) for sales exceeding one million units. Internationally, the record enjoyed similar success. It debuted atop the Canadian Albums Chart, where it eventually attained double-Platinum recognition. The album additionally debuted at number one on the UK Albums Chart, and was later certified Platinum there. According to the International Federation of the Phonographic Industry (IFPI), Believe was the sixth best-selling album of 2012 worldwide, with sales of three million copies.

Five singles were released from Believe, several of which became international successes. Its lead single, "Boyfriend", peaked at number two on the US Billboard Hot 100, and reached number one on the Canadian Hot 100. Follow-ups "As Long as You Love Me" and "Beauty and a Beat" positioned within the top-ten in both the United States and Canada. "Right Here" received little promotion, consequentially peaking in the lower end of the Billboard Hot 100, while the final single, "All Around the World", performed moderately in most markets. The project was additionally promoted through Bieber's second worldwide concert series, the Believe Tour, in 2012 and 2013. Bieber's third remix album, Believe Acoustic, was released in January 2013, featuring acoustic and live versions of songs from Believe.

== Background ==
On March 2, 2012, Bieber appeared on The Ellen DeGeneres Show to announce that the first single from his upcoming album would be called "Boyfriend". The single was later released on March 26, 2012. The song was written by Bieber and Mike Posner, and produced by Posner and Mason Levy.

Bieber also invited his fans to participate in one of the creative decisions for the "Boyfriend" single. Two potential cover arts were published on Bieber's website, and fans were encouraged to vote for which one they preferred. The cover with the most votes became the official cover for the single.

== Composition ==
According to a writer from Los Angeles Times, the album adds a Eurohouse beat to Bieber's usual R&B. and according to The A.V. Club, Believe is loaded up with "EDM accouterments, seeking a comfortable middle ground where Bieber's impressively refined Pop-Rnb croon can rub up on Techno blasts and garish Dubstep drops."

The intro track "All Around The World" is a "dubsteppy" synth-pop and Eurodance song. According to Billboard the song's "breathy vocals swirl around a beat that pierces the listener on first contact. Ludacris raps in double-time as the album's electronica obsession is immediately presented." "Boyfriend" is an acoustic R&B-influenced track with hip-hop elements. "As Long As You Love Me" is an EDM, electropop and dubstep song. According to Entertainment Weekly, "Catching Feelings" "turns [Bieber] it into a soulful R&B". The fifth track "Take You" club-friendly anthem starts off with a Latin-tinged acoustic guitar before transforming into a synth-pop Euro-dance number. And the song is a Dubsteppy Eurodance song "that sweeps through different tempos". The sixth song "Right Here" features Drake. It is a pop,, hip hop-soul ballad. According to Bieber's manager Scooter Braun, "Fall" was inspired by "the weepy romance" A Walk to Remember. Further saying, "Bieber tries to extract sorrow from the rumbling percussion, falling to his knees as layered vocals increase the melodrama". The eighth song, "Die in Your Arms", is a pop-R&B track that incorporates hip hop beats, finger snaps and melodic piano chords in its instrumentation and is similar to early tracks by the Jackson 5. Leah Collins of the National Post described the song as a "Baby 2.0", adding that "like 'Baby', 'Die in Your Arms' has a certain old-fashioned pop flavour." "Thought of You", a Diplo produced song, has a "falsetto-driven ode to living in the moment; [...] its bass thickening around a series of futuristic movements until ending, somehow appropriately, with a piano and a siren." The tenth track, "Beauty and a Beat" features Nicki Minaj. It is an electropop, EDM, and R&B song. Sarah Deen of Metro described it as a "frantic dance track", while Rolling Stone's Jon Dolan called the song a "disco inferno".

"One Love" has "space-age synths, watered down DnB beat and defiant lack of fluff make it a total mega-hit". The twelfth track, "Be Alright", according to Billboard is "a guitar ballad as a soothing lullaby, in which Bieber doesn't try to over-sing his basic love lyrics." The title track, "Believe", according to the same magazine, is a "substantial anthem that plays out like a Disney song". The song involves a gospel choir, while the sound of an acoustic guitar is almost as common as a dance beat. "Out Of Town Girl" "make[s] for a superior throwback R&B joint that could well end up as the album's secret keeper".

== Singles ==
Bieber announced via Twitter that the first single off third studio album, Believe was released in March 2012. On March 1, 2012, Bieber appeared on The Ellen DeGeneres Show to announce that the first single from his upcoming album, Believe, was called "Boyfriend" and was released on March 26, 2012. The song was written by Bieber and Mike Posner, and produced by Posner and Mason Levy. Two cover arts were published on Bieber's website, and fans were encouraged to vote for which cover they would preferred; with the most votes for cover and it will become the official cover of for the single. "Boyfriend" reached number two on the Billboard Hot 100. It also reached the top ten in several countries worldwide.

Island Def Jam confirmed on June 26, 2012, that "As Long as You Love Me" featuring Big Sean, which was previously released as the third and final promo single as part of the iTunes album countdown to Believe, was released as the official second single off the album. It was released July 10, 2012. It peaked at 6 on the Billboard Hot 100 chart in the US.

"Beauty and a Beat", is the third single off the album. It was released on October 24, 2012, and features vocals from rapper Nicki Minaj. It has so far peaked at 5 in the US.

"Right Here" featuring Drake was released as the fourth U.S. single, impacting U.S. Rhythmic radio on February 5, 2013.

"All Around the World" which was released as a promotional single, was then released as the fourth international single from Believe. It was released in the US on February 26, 2013, as the fifth and final US single and in the UK on April 1, 2013.

=== Promotional singles ===
The first promotional single from the album, the Rodney Jerkins, Dennis Aganee Jenkins, Travis Sayles-produced "Die in Your Arms", was released to iTunes on May 29, 2012. The song samples Michael Jackson's "We've Got a Good Thing Going" and was written with ten co-writers. The second promo single "All Around the World", which features Ludacris, was released on iTunes on June 4, 2012. "As Long as You Love Me" featuring Big Sean was released on June 11, 2012, as the third promotional single.

=== Other songs ===
On May 7, 2012, Bieber announced that he would release a song titled "Turn to You (Mother's Day Dedication)" on May 11, 2012, for Mother's Day weekend. He stated that the proceeds of the song would go to help single mothers. Although some had suspected it would, "Turn to You (Mother's Day Dedication)" did not make the final track listing for Believe. It was revealed during Bieber's interview with Fuse, that he collaborated with Lil Wayne on a song called "Backpack" that would be included on a "repackaged" version of the album. "Right Here", featuring Drake, also debuted at number 95 on the Hot 100. "Be Alright" was not released as a single from the album but was certified Gold in Denmark.

== Critical reception ==
Professional ratings
Aggregate scores
Source	Rating
AnyDecentMusic?	5.9/10
Metacritic	68/100
Review scores
Source	Rating
AllMusic	4/5 stars
The A.V. Club	B−
BBC Music	(favorable)
Entertainment Weekly	B+
The Independent	2/5 stars
Los Angeles Times	3.5/4 stars
Now	3/5 stars
The Observer	4/5 stars
Rolling Stone	3/5 stars
Slant	2.5/5 stars

Believe has received generally favorable reviews from music critics. At Metacritic, which assigns a normalized rating out of 100 to reviews from mainstream critics, the album received an average score of 68, based on 14 reviews, which indicates "generally favorable reviews".

While BBC Music noted Bieber's ongoing "tween appeal," it also examined his gradual stylist evolution from his previous album. The New York Times noted the search for maturity Bieber exhibited. It complimented the natural strength of his voice, which did not need as much technical enhancement as it did previously. However, Slant Magazine criticized the production's need to "slice, dice, and Auto-Tune [Bieber's] notes into shape" Entertainment Weekly praised the pop star's evolution, calling the album both a "reinvention and a reintroduction." Rolling Stone noted the deeper voice and more intense beats found on the album, although it lampooned one of his euphemisms for newfound sexual maturity.

The New York Times noted the difficulty Bieber faced in creating the album—a tension between his love of R&B and the profitability of pop music—while suggesting that his "savvy compromises" made the conflict manageable." Entertainment Weekly praised the variety of audiences for the album, calling it "the rare album that tries to be everything to everyone and largely succeeds."

Reviews of the vocals on specific songs were mixed. The New York Times review complained of certain songs where Bieber "sounded bored" and unlike himself, although other tracks were said to show him when he "leans on his instincts." The review credited Bieber for his "limber and wounded" vocals. It suggested that Bieber's voice would continue to evolve, and that in a few years it could fully express "angst". It said Bieber was "more credible when begging or retreating", while BBC Music stated similarly that "his confidence, for the most part, [is] played down."

A large number of reviews compared Bieber to Justin Timberlake, a once-teenage pop star who achieved great success during his evolution from teenage boy band member to young adult. Most found the situations very different, saying Bieber was better suited to pursuing his own style rather than follow in the footsteps of Timberlake. The New York Times, however, complimented his references to Michael Jackson as aspirational. Meanwhile, reviewers tended to dislike Bieber's work with other pop stars. BBC Music said that, despite an abundance of guest contributors, Bieber is "overshadowed."

Assessments of the long-term impact of the album generally avoided calling Believe a revolutionary step forward. The Independent roundly criticized the artist's lack of innovation, calling it a "pitifully timid affair". The New York Times noted that while Bieber was not ushering in radical changes to pop music, he was at least playing to his personal strengths. Billboard noted the singer's potential with future releases, pointing out "multiple songs that hint at what Bieber could become someday."

== Commercial performance ==
Believe debuted at number one on the Billboard 200 with first-week sales of 374,000. It was Bieber's fourth number-one album. It dropped two spots in its second week to number three with sales of 115,000 copies. Believe was certified platinum by the Recording Industry Association of America (RIAA) on July 31, 2012, and has sold 1,610,000 copies in the US as of December 2015.

The album sold 57,000 copies in its first week in Canada, debuting atop the Canadian Albums Chart. In the following week, the album fell to number two selling 18,000 copies, behind Linkin Park's Living Things. It also debuted at number one on the UK Albums Chart with sales of 38,115 copies, making Bieber the second youngest male solo artist ever to reach number one. In Japan, the album entered the Oricon Weekly Albums Chart at number seven, selling 13,886 copies. As of July 26, 2012, the album has sold over 98,000 copies in Canada. In Brazil, the album was certified platinum by Associação Brasileira dos Produtores de Discos (ABPD) within three days of release. The album debuted at number-one in Mexico and was later certified Platinum by Asociación Mexicana de Productores de Fonogramas y Videogramas ending the year as the 14th best selling of 2012. In November 2013, Universal Music México awarded Bieber with a triple platinum certification for sales of over 180,000 copies as well as over 300,000 digital tracks.

== Believe Acoustic ==
On December 14, 2012, Bieber announced on The Ellen Show that he would be releasing an acoustic album of Believe. It was released on January 29, 2013.

== Track listing ==
No.	Title	Writer(s)	Producer(s)	Length
1.	"All Around the World" (featuring Ludacris)	Justin Bieber; Nasri Atweh; Adam Messinger; Nolan Lambroza; Christopher Bridges	Messinger; Nasri; Lambroza; Kuk Harrell (vocal)	4:04
2.	"Boyfriend"	Bieber; Mike Posner; Mason Levy; Matthew Musto	Posner; MdL; Harrell (vocal)	2:51
3.	"As Long as You Love Me" (featuring Big Sean)	Rodney "Darkchild" Jerkins; Andre Lindal; Atweh; Bieber; Sean Anderson	Jerkins; Lindal; Harrell (vocal)	3:49
4.	"Catching Feelings"	Bieber; Patrick "j.Que" Smith; Antonio Dixon; Eric Dawkins; Damon Thomas; Kenneth Edmonds	The Pentagon; Smith; Harrell (vocal)	3:54
5.	"Take You"	Bieber; Raphaël Judrin; Pierre-Antoine Melki; Ross Golan; James "JHart" Abrahart; Alex Dezen; Ben Maddahi	SoFly & Nius; Harrell (vocal)	3:40
6.	"Right Here" (featuring Drake)	Bieber; Aubrey Graham; Chauncey Hollis; Eric Bellinger	Hit-Boy; Harrell (vocal)	3:24
7.	"Fall"	Bieber; Levy; Jacob Luttrell	MdL; Luttrell; Harrell (vocal)	4:08
8.	"Die in Your Arms"	Jerkins; Dennis "Aganee" Jenkins; Travis Sayles; Thomas Lumpkins; Kelly Lumpkins; Bieber; Berry Gordy; Alphonso Mizell; Freddie Perren; Deke Richards; Herb Rooney	Jerkins; Jenkins; Sayles; Harrell (vocal)	3:57
9.	"Thought of You"	Bieber; Ariel Rechtshaid; Thomas Pentz; Bellinger	Rechtshaid; Diplo; Harrell (vocal)	3:50
10.	"Beauty and a Beat" (featuring Nicki Minaj)	Max Martin; Anton Zaslavski; Savan Kotecha; Onika Maraj	Martin; Zedd, Harrell (vocal)	3:48
11.	"One Love"	Bieber; Brandon Green	Bei Maejor; Harrell (vocal)	3:54
12.	"Be Alright"	Bieber; Dan Kanter	Bieber; Kanter; Harrell (vocal)	3:09
13.	"Believe"	Bieber; Atweh; Messinger; Lambroza; Tucker Band (Jonny Griffen, Danny Wilson, Darren Black, Graeme Hogg)	Messinger; Nasri; Harrell (vocal)	3:42

iTunes Store bonus track
No.	Title	Writer(s)	Producer(s)	Length
14.	"Love Me Like You Do"	Bieber; Green	Bei Maejor; Harrell (vocal)	4:39

Amazon MP3 bonus track
No.	Title	Length
14.	"Hey Girl"	1:38

Claire's exclusive bonus track
No.	Title	Writer(s)	Producer(s)	Length
14.	"Boyfriend" (Remix)	Bieber; Posner; Levy; Musto	Posner; MdL; Oliver Vice; Harrell (vocal)	4:46

Deluxe edition bonus tracks
No.	Title	Writer(s)	Producer(s)	Length
14.	"Out of Town Girl"	Bieber; Kenneth Coby; Graham Edwards; Liam Joseph Horne	Soundz, Harrell (vocal)	3:33
15.	"She Don't Like the Lights"	Jerkins; Lindal; Tiyon Mack; Bieber	Jerkins; Lindal; Harrell (vocal)	3:59
16.	"Maria"	Jerkins; August Rigo; Bieber; Scooter Braun	Jerkins; Harrell (vocal)	4:08

Spotify deluxe edition bonus track
No.	Title	Writer(s)	Producer(s)	Length
17.	"Fairytale" (featuring Jaden Smith)	Bieber; Jaden Smith; Bernard Harvey; Anthony L. Saunders	Harv & S	3:12

Japanese deluxe edition and tour edition bonus track
No.	Title	Writer(s)	Producer(s)	Length
17.	"Just Like Them"	Bieber; Atweh; Harvey; Saunders	Harv & S	2:52

Japanese iTunes Store edition
No.	Title	Writer(s)	Producer(s)	Length
18.	"Love Me Like You Do"	Bieber; Green	Bei Maejor; Harrell (vocal)	4:39

Notes

- "Die in Your Arms" contains samples of the recording "We've Got a Good Thing Going" as performed by Michael Jackson, and written by Berry Gordy, Alphonso Mizell, Freddie Perren, and Deke Richards. It also contains samples of the recording "Synthetic Substitution" as performed by Melvin Bliss as written by Herb Rooney.

== Personnel ==
Credits for Believe (Deluxe Edition) adapted from album liner notes.

- Justin Bieber – lead vocals (all tracks), producer (track 12), background vocals (tracks 3, 8, 15, 16)
- Wil Anspach – assistant engineer (track 9)
- Big Sean – rap (track 3)
- Delbert Bowers – mixing assistant (tracks 2, 5, 8, 12–16)
- Scott "Scooter" Braun – executive producer
- Andre "Drizza Don" Bridges – engineer (track 1)
- Brandon N. Caddell – assistant engineer (tracks 3, 8, 15, 16)
- Matt Champlin – engineer (tracks 3, 8, 15, 16), co-mixing (tracks 3, 8, 15)
- Ariel Chobaz – vocal engineer (track 10)
- Thomas Cullison – assistant engineer (track 2)
- Eric Dawkins – producer and backing vocals (track 4)
- Deanna DellaCioppa – additional background vocals (track 13)
- Diplo – producer (track 9)
- Antonio Dixon – producer and additional instruments (track 4)
- Sevada Djavadghazaryans – engineer (track 15)
- Drake – rap (track 6)
- Graham Edwards – guitar (track 14)
- Dammo Farmer – bass (track 4)
- Chris Galland – mixing assistant (tracks 2, 5, 8, 12–16)
- Serban Ghenea – mixing (tracks 1, 10)
- Josh Gudwin – engineer (all tracks)
- John Hanes – mix engineer (tracks 1, 10)
- Kuk Harrell – vocal producer (all tracks), backing vocals (track 4), album producer
- Trehy Harris – mixing assistant (track 6)
- Christopher Hicks – album producer
- Hit-Boy – producer (track 6)
- DJ Tay James – scratches (track 6)
- Dennis "Aganee" Jenkins – producer and drums (track 8)
- Rodney "Darkchild" Jerkins – producer (tracks 3, 8, 15, 16), music (tracks 3, 15, 16), co-mixing (tracks 3, 8, 15), live harpsichord and live piano (track 8)
- Jaycen Joshua – mixing (track 6)
- Dan Kanter – producer (track 12)
- Rob Kinelski – engineer (track 3)
- Dave Kutch – mastering
- Nolan Lambroza – producer and arranger (track 1), instrumentation and programming (tracks 1, 13)
- Graham Liam – guitars (track 14)
- Andre Lindal – producer and music (tracks 3, 15)
- Ludacris – rap (track 1)
- Thomas Lumpkins – additional background vocals (track 8)
- Jacob Luttrell – producer (track 7)
- Peter Mack – assistant engineer (tracks 4–7, 10, 14)
- Bei Maejor – producer (track 11)
- Fabian Marasciullo – mixing (track 11)
- Manny Marroquin – mixing (tracks 2, 5, 8, 12–16)
- Max Martin – producer, vocal producer, and vocal mixing (track 10)
- MdL – producer (tracks 2, 7)
- Adam Messinger – producer, arranger, instrumentation, and programming (tracks 1, 13)
- Nicki Minaj – rap (track 10)
- Greg Morgan – sound design (tracks 3, 8, 15, 16), additional background vocals (track 8)
- Matthew Musto – guitar producer (track 2)
- Nasri – producer, arranger, and additional background vocals (tracks 1, 13); background vocals and vocal arrangement (track 3)
- Chris "Tek" O'Ryan – engineer (tracks 2–10, 12–15)
- Dave Poler – mixing assistant (track 11)
- Mike Posner – producer and keyboards (track 2)
- Usher Raymond IV – executive producer
- Ariel Rechtshaid – producer (track 9)
- Artie Reynolds – bass (track 8)
- August Rigo – background vocals (track 16)
- Michael Ripoll – guitar (track 4)
- Ramon Rivas – assistant engineer (tracks 5, 11, 12)
- Daniela Rivera – additional/assistant engineer (tracks 3, 4, 7, 9)
- Travis Sayles – producer, strings, and piano (track 8)
- Gennaro Schiano – assistant engineer (track 6)
- Phil Seaford – mixing assistant (tracks 1, 10)
- j.Que Smith – producer (track 4)
- SoFly & Nius – producers (track 5)
- Soundz – producer and programming (track 14)
- James "Scrappy" Stassen – engineer (track 12)
- Benny Steele – guitar engineer (track 2)
- Phil Tan – mixing (tracks 3, 4, 7, 9)
- Damon Thomas – producer (track 4)
- Anna Ugarte – assistang engineer (track 3)
- Zedd – producer, instrumental mixing, keyboards, and programming (track 10)

== Charts ==
=== Weekly charts ===
Chart (2012–2026)	Peak position
Argentine Albums (CAPIF)	1
Australian Albums (ARIA)	1
Austrian Albums (Ö3 Austria)	1
Belgian Albums (Ultratop Flanders)	2
Belgian Albums (Ultratop Wallonia)	2
Canadian Albums (Billboard)	1
Croatian Albums (HDU)	1
Czech Albums (ČNS IFPI)	6
Danish Albums (Hitlisten)	1
Dutch Albums (Album Top 100)	2
Finnish Albums (Suomen virallinen lista)	3
French Albums (SNEP)	3
German Albums (Offizielle Top 100)	3
Hungarian Albums (MAHASZ)	14
Irish Albums (IRMA)	1
Italian Albums (FIMI)	1
Japanese Albums (Oricon)	7
Mexican Albums (Top 100 Mexico)	1
New Zealand Albums (RMNZ)	1
Norwegian Albums (VG-lista)	1
Polish Albums (ZPAV)	4
Portuguese Albums (AFP)	2
Russian Albums (2M)	25
Scottish Albums (Official Charts)	3
Slovak Albums (ČNS IFPI)	7
South African Albums (RISA)	4
Spanish Albums (Promusicae)	1
Swedish Albums (Sverigetopplistan)	1
Swiss Albums (Schweizer Hitparade)	3
UK Albums (Official Charts)	1
US Billboard 200	1

=== Year-end charts ===
Chart (2012)	Position
Australian Albums (ARIA)	29
Belgian Albums (Ultratop Flanders)	44
Belgian Albums (Ultratop Wallonia)	63
Canadian Albums (Billboard)	9
Danish Albums (Hitlisten)	10
Dutch Albums (Album Top 100)	62
French Albums (SNEP)	131
Mexican Albums (Top 100 Mexico)	14
New Zealand Albums (RMNZ)	28
Spanish Albums (PROMUSICAE)	31
Swedish Albums (Sverigetopplistan)	22
Swiss Albums (Schweizer Hitparade)	96
UK Albums (OCC)	72
US Billboard 200	11

Chart (2013)	Position
Belgian Albums (Ultratop Flanders)	76
Canadian Albums (Billboard)	43
Swedish Albums (Sverigetopplistan)	82
US Billboard 200	41

=== Decade-end charts ===
Chart (2010–2019)	Position
US Billboard 200	89

== Certifications and sales ==
Region	Certification	Certified units/sales
Australia (ARIA)	2× Platinum	140,000^{‡}
Brazil (Pro-Música Brasil)	3× Platinum	120,000^{*}
Canada (Music Canada)	2× Platinum	179,000
Chile	—	50,000
Denmark (IFPI Danmark)	5× Platinum	100,000^{‡}
Germany (BVMI)	Gold	100,000^{‡}
Ireland (IRMA)	Gold	7,500^{^}
Italy (FIMI)	Platinum	60,000^{*}
Mexico (AMPROFON)	3× Platinum	180,000^{^}
New Zealand (RMNZ)	3× Platinum	45,000^{‡}
Norway (IFPI Norway)	2× Platinum	60,000^{*}
Poland (ZPAV)	Platinum	20,000^{‡}
Portugal (AFP)	Gold	3,500^{‡}
Singapore (RIAS)	Platinum	10,000^{*}
Spain (Promusicae)	Gold	20,000^{^}
Sweden (GLF)	Platinum	40,000^{‡}
United Kingdom (BPI)	Platinum	300,000^{‡}
United States (RIAA)	3× Platinum	1,610,000
^{*} Sales figures based on certification alone.^{^} Shipments figures based on certification alone.^{‡} Sales+streaming figures based on certification alone.

== Release history ==
Region	Date	Label
Australia	June 15, 2012	Universal Music
Germany	June 15, 2012	Universal Music
Ireland	June 15, 2012	Def Jam, Mercury
United Kingdom	June 18, 2012	Def Jam, Mercury
Philippines	June 18, 2012	MCA Music
United States	June 19, 2012	Island, RBMG, Schoolboy
Poland	June 19, 2012	Universal Music
Japan	June 20, 2012	Universal Music

== See also ==
- List of UK Albums Chart number ones of the 2010s
- List of number-one albums in Norway
- List of number-one albums of 2012 (Australia)
- List of number-one albums of 2012 (Canada)
- List of number-one albums of 2012 (Ireland)
- List of number-one albums of 2012 (Mexico)
- List of number-one albums of 2012 (Spain)
- List of number-one albums of 2012 (U.S.)
- List of number-one hits of 2012 (Austria)
- List of number-one hits of 2012 (Italy)
