= Beauty and a Beat =

Single by Justin Bieber featuring Nicki Minaj

from the album Believe
- Released: October 24, 2012
- Genre: EDM; electropop
- Length: 3:47
- Label: Island; RBMG; Schoolboy
- Songwriters: Max Martin; Anton Zaslavski; Savan Kotecha; Onika Maraj
- Producers: Max Martin; Zedd

Justin Bieber singles chronology
"As Long as You Love Me" (2012)	"Beauty and a Beat" (2012)	"Right Here" (2013)

Nicki Minaj singles chronology
"Va Va Voom" (2012)	"Beauty and a Beat" (2012)	"Freedom" (2012)

Music video
- "Beauty and a Beat" on YouTube

"Beauty and a Beat" is a song by Canadian singer Justin Bieber from his third studio album Believe (2012). It features Trinidadian rapper and songwriter Nicki Minaj, who co-wrote it with Savan Kotecha, Max Martin and Zedd. It was also produced by the latter two with a heavy drum machine and "rushing" synthesizers. Lyrically, it speaks about Bieber wanting to take his love interest to a club, where they can "party like it's 3012". It is the only song from Believe that Bieber did not co-write. The song became the third official single from the album.

Following the release of Believe, "Beauty and a Beat" debuted on the US Billboard Hot 100 at 72 due to strong digital downloads. After the release of the song's music video, it re-entered the Hot 100 and peaked at 5. It also peaked at number 4 on the Canadian Hot 100, while reaching the top 10 in over 40 countries. Following Bieber's performance at Coachella 2026, the song surged on streaming platforms globally and reached a new peak in numerous countries, becoming Minaj's first or second in most of them and Bieber's first since "Stay" (2021).

== Background and release ==
Savan Kotecha and Onika Maraj wrote "Beauty and a Beat" with its producers Max Martin and Anton Zaslavski. Maraj, known by her stage-name Nicki Minaj, provides guest vocals on the track. Bieber later spoke upon the collaboration with Minaj, saying: "I wanted a female rapper and I think that she is the best choice. I felt she just fit on the song perfectly." An album of remixes was released on December 11, 2012.

The song was released on October 12, 2012 on the video-sharing website YouTube; it was included on Just Dance 4 along with other songs on the game.

== Composition and lyrics ==
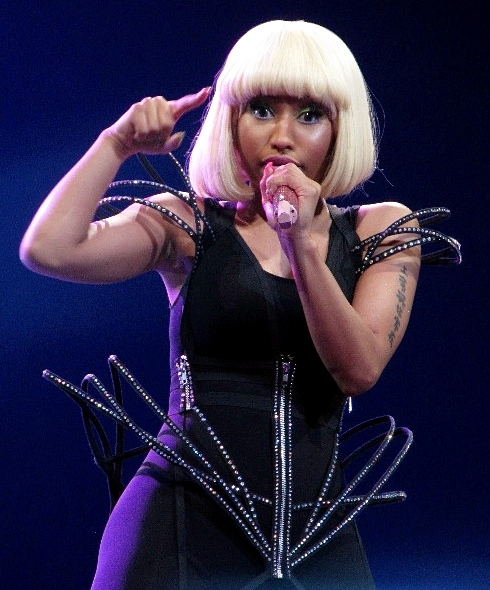
Guest vocals are provided by rapper Nicki Minaj.

"Beauty and a Beat" is an uptempo EDM and electropop song that lasts 3 minutes and 48 seconds. With the chord progression of F–Dm7–Am–Gsus, the song is written in the key of A minor, vocals spanning from D_{3} to A_{4} in common time. The song moves at a tempo of 128 beats per minute.

The song contains elements of R&B. Sarah Deen of Metro described it as a "frantic dance track", while Rolling Stone's Jon Dolan called the song a "disco-inferno". "Beauty and a Beat" contains fast-paced drum beats and an acid house break down. Bieber's then-girlfriend Selena Gomez is referenced in the song during Minaj's rap: "Justin Bieber/You know I'm gonna hit 'em with the ether/Buns out, wiener/But I gotta keep an eye out for Selener." Reviewer Jason Lipshutz noted the rhyme between "wiener" and her given name.

== Critical reception ==
The song was met with mixed reviews. Many contemporary critics praised Bieber's attempt to reach an audience not usually interested in his music, while others criticized its lyrics and Minaj's rap. Andy Gill of The Independent listed the song in his "Download" category during an album review for Believe. Laura Sassano commented on the song upon its leak, saying: "The new song continues Justin's quest to grow up and be taken more seriously as an artist". Becca Longmire of Entertainmentwise felt that the song was impressive; she also compared this with Bieber's previous single "Baby".

== Music video ==
The music video was released on October 12, 2012 on Bieber's YouTube channel. According to the video's storyline, in October 2012, 3 hours of personal footage was stolen from Justin and was illegally uploaded by an anonymous blogger. It starts with a short montage of video clips, and heads into a party at a waterpark featuring dancers, and Nicki Minaj rapping beside Justin in a pool. The video ends with Justin sliding down a waterslide. A gameplay clip of "Good Feeling" by Flo Rida from Just Dance 4 was featured.

Bieber wrote the video's storyline himself and co-directed the video itself with Jon M. Chu. All of the waterpark footage was shot on scene at Raging Waters in San Dimas, a suburb of Los Angeles. Most of the clip was recorded on a GoPro Hero 2 by Bieber, with some footage shots on the Olympus Tough TG-1. The music video features international synchronized swimming group, Aqualillies. As of June 2026, the music video had received more than 1.3 billion views.

== Live performances ==
Bieber performed the song for the first time at the American Music Awards with Minaj. Since then, Minaj has rapped her verse on select dates of her Pink Friday: Reloaded Tour. Bieber also performed the song at the 2012 Victoria's Secret Fashion Show and the 2015 Wango Tango. In 2026, Bieber performed several of his early hits, including "Beauty and a Beat", at Coachella, which led to the song's rapid viral success on streaming platforms.

== Track listing ==
Digital download (Remixes EP)
No.	Title	Length
1.	"Beauty and a Beat" (featuring Nicki Minaj) (Wideboys Club Mix)	6:08
2.	"Beauty and a Beat" (featuring Nicki Minaj) (Wideboys Radio Mix)	3:53
3.	"Beauty and a Beat" (featuring Nicki Minaj) (Wideboys Dub)	6:08
4.	"Beauty and a Beat" (featuring Nicki Minaj) (Bisbetic Club Mix)	6:10
5.	"Beauty and a Beat" (featuring Nicki Minaj) (Bisbetic Radio Mix)	3:27
6.	"Beauty and a Beat" (featuring Nicki Minaj) (Bisbetic Instrumental)	6:10
7.	"Beauty and a Beat" (featuring Nicki Minaj) (Steven Redant Beauty and the Club Mix)	7:22
8.	"Beauty and a Beat" (featuring Nicki Minaj) (Steven Redant Beauty and the Dub)	7:22
9.	"Beauty and a Beat" (featuring Nicki Minaj) (Steven Redant Beauty and the Vocal Dub)	7:22
10.	"Beauty and a Beat" (featuring Nicki Minaj) (DJ Laszlo Body Rock Club Mix)	7:30
11.	"Beauty and a Beat" (featuring Nicki Minaj) (DJ Laszlo Body Rock Radio Mix)	3:59
12.	"Beauty and a Beat" (featuring Nicki Minaj) (DJ Laszlo Body Rock Instrumental)	7:31

== Charts ==
=== Weekly charts ===
Chart (2012–2014)	Peak position
Australia (ARIA)	9
Austria (Ö3 Austria Top 40)	42
Belgium (Ultratop 50 Flanders)	21
Belgium (Ultratop 50 Wallonia)	28
Canada Hot 100 (Billboard)	4
Canada CHR/Top 40 (Billboard)	3
Canada Hot AC (Billboard)	17
Czech Republic Airplay (ČNS IFPI)	18
Denmark (Tracklisten)	30
France (SNEP)	28
Germany (GfK)	53
Hungary (Rádiós Top 40)	8
Ireland (IRMA)	20
Israel International Airplay (Media Forest)	9
Italy (FIMI)	39
Japan Hot 100 (Billboard)	11
Lebanon (Lebanese Top 20)	3
Mexico Airplay (Billboard)	16
Netherlands (Dutch Tipparade 40)	1
Netherlands (Single Top 100)	43
New Zealand (Recorded Music NZ)	6
Norway (VG-lista)	17
Romania Airplay (Romanian Top 100)	45
Scottish Singles Sales (Official Charts)	13
Slovakia Airplay (ČNS IFPI)	19
Sweden (Sverigetopplistan)	23
Switzerland (Schweizer Hitparade)	46
Ukraine Airplay (TopHit)	130
UK Singles (OCC)	16
US Billboard Hot 100	5
US Adult Pop Airplay (Billboard)	27
US Dance Club Songs (Billboard)	1
US Dance Airplay (Billboard)	3
US Pop Airplay (Billboard)	2
US Rhythmic Airplay (Billboard)	4
Venezuela Pop/Rock Airplay (Record Report)	4

Chart (2026)	Peak position
Argentina (CAPIF)	8
Argentina Hot 100 (Billboard)	15
Australia (ARIA)	5
Austria (Ö3 Austria Top 40)	1
Belgium (Ultratop 50 Flanders)	38
Belgium (Ultratop 50 Wallonia)	37
Bolivia (Billboard)	3
Brazil Hot 100 (Billboard)	37
Canada Hot 100 (Billboard)	4
Central America Anglo Airplay (Monitor Latino)	13
Chile (Billboard)	7
Colombia Hot 100 (Billboard)	59
CIS Airplay (TopHit)	136
Costa Rica Anglo Airplay (Monitor Latino)	6
Croatia (Billboard)	4
Czech Republic Singles Digital (ČNS IFPI)	1
Denmark (Tracklisten)	8
Ecuador (Billboard)	4
Ecuador Streaming (Promúsica)	6
El Salvador Anglo Airplay (Monitor Latino)	6
Finland (Suomen virallinen lista)	8
France (SNEP)	8
Germany (GfK)	1
Global 200 (Billboard)	1
Greece International (IFPI)	1
Honduras Anglo Airplay (Monitor Latino)	3
Hong Kong (Billboard)	1
Hungary (Single Top 40)	19
Iceland (Billboard)	6
India International (IMI)	2
Indonesia (IFPI)	7
Ireland (IRMA)	2
Israel (Mako Hitlist)	27
Italy (FIMI)	4
Japan Hot 100 (Billboard)	82
Latin America Anglo Airplay (Monitor Latino)	4
Latvia Streaming (LaIPA)	1
Lebanon (Lebanese Top 20)	9
Lithuania (AGATA)	2
Luxembourg (Billboard)	3
Malaysia (IFPI)	1
Malaysia International (RIM)	1
Middle East and North Africa (IFPI)	1
Mexico (Billboard)	20
Netherlands (Dutch Top 40)	9
Netherlands (Single Top 100)	1
New Zealand (Billboard)	6
New Zealand Catalogue Singles (RMNZ)	1
Nigeria (TurnTable Top 100)	87
Nigeria Airplay (TurnTable)	53
North Africa (IFPI)	13
Norway (IFPI Norge)	2
Panama Anglo Airplay (Monitor Latino)	9
Panama Streaming (PRODUCE)	12
Peru Anglo Airplay (Monitor Latino)	10
Peru Streaming (Promúsica)	4
Philippines (IFPI)	7
Philippines Hot 100 (Billboard Philippines)	6
Poland Airplay (OLiS)	7
Poland Streaming (OLiS)	6
Portugal (AFP)	2
Puerto Rico Anglo Airplay (Monitor Latino)	12
Romania (Billboard)	6
Russia Streaming (TopHit)	43
Saudi Arabia (IFPI)	3
Singapore (RIAS)	1
Slovakia Airplay (ČNS IFPI)	18
Slovakia Singles Digital (ČNS IFPI)	1
South Korea (Circle)	106
Spain (Promusicae)	3
Sweden (Sverigetopplistan)	1
Switzerland (Schweizer Hitparade)	1
Taiwan (Billboard)	1
United Arab Emirates (IFPI)	1
UK Singles (Official Charts)	3
US Billboard Hot 100	11
Venezuela Anglo Airplay (Monitor Latino)	4
Vietnam (IFPI)	3
Vietnam Hot 100 (Billboard)	5

=== Monthly charts ===
Monthly chart performance
Chart (2026)	Peak position
Lithuania Airplay (TopHit)	65
Panama Streaming (PRODUCE)	50

=== Year-end charts ===
Chart (2012)	Position
Australia (ARIA)	68
UK Singles (Official Charts Company)	128

Chart (2013)	Position
Brazil Airplay (Crowley)	70
Canada (Canadian Hot 100)	37
France (SNEP)	171
Hungary (Rádiós Top 40)	68
Sweden (Sverigetopplistan)	64
UK Singles (Official Charts Company)	186
US Billboard Hot 100	42
US Dance Club Songs (Billboard)	10
US Dance/Mix Show Airplay (Billboard)	15
US Mainstream Top 40 (Billboard)	25
US Rhythmic (Billboard)	28

== Certifications ==
Region	Certification	Certified units/sales
Australia (ARIA)	7× Platinum	490,000^{‡}
Brazil (Pro-Música Brasil)	Diamond	250,000^{‡}
Canada (Music Canada)	3× Platinum	240,000^{*}
Denmark (IFPI Danmark)	2× Platinum	180,000^{‡}
Germany (BVMI)	Platinum	600,000^{‡}
Italy (FIMI)	Platinum	100,000^{‡}
Japan (RIAJ)	Gold	100,000^{*}
Mexico (AMPROFON)	Platinum	60,000^{*}
New Zealand (RMNZ)	5× Platinum	150,000^{‡}
Norway (IFPI Norway)	Platinum	10,000^{*}
Spain (Promusicae) sales + streams since 2015	2× Platinum	200,000^{‡}
United Kingdom (BPI)	3× Platinum	1,800,000^{‡}
United States (RIAA)	8× Platinum	8,000,000^{‡}
Streaming
Denmark (IFPI Danmark)	Platinum	1,800,000^{†}
Greece (IFPI Greece)	2× Platinum	4,000,000^{†}
^{*} Sales figures based on certification alone.^{‡} Sales+streaming figures based on certification alone.^{†} Streaming-only figures based on certification alone.

== Release history ==
Region	Date	Format	Version
United Kingdom	October 24, 2012	Mainstream radio	Original
Italy	October 26, 2012	Mainstream radio	Original
United States	November 13, 2012	Mainstream radio	Original
Worldwide	December 11, 2012	Digital download	Remixes EP
United States	April 21, 2026	Mainstream radio (re-release)	Original

== See also ==
- List of number-one dance singles of 2013 (U.S.)
- List of number-one hits of 2026 (Austria)
- List of number-one hits of 2026 (Germany)
- List of number-one songs of 2026 (Malaysia)
- List of number-one songs of 2026 (Singapore)
- List of number-one singles of the 2020s (Sweden)
