= Boyfriend (Justin Bieber song) =

Single by Justin Bieber

from the album Believe
- Released: March 26, 2012
- Recorded: January–February 2012
- Studio: Chalice Recording Studios (Hollywood, Los Angeles)
- Genre: Pop; R&B
- Length: 2:52
- Label: Island; RBMG; Schoolboy
- Songwriters: Mike Posner; Mason Levy; Matthew Musto; Justin Bieber
- Producers: Mike Posner; MdL

Justin Bieber singles chronology
"Live My Life" (2012)	"Boyfriend" (2012)	"As Long as You Love Me" (2012)

Music video
- "Boyfriend" on YouTube

"Boyfriend" is a song by Canadian singer Justin Bieber, taken from his third studio album, Believe (2012). Bieber explained that the track would surprise people in different ways, since it is a musical departure from his previous material. A snippet of "Boyfriend" was previewed on The Ellen DeGeneres Show on March 1, 2012, Bieber's 18th birthday. The song was announced as a single on the same day, and was released on March 26, 2012. The cover art was revealed on March 19, 2012.

Musically, "Boyfriend" is an R&B influenced song that features beats reminiscent of American record producer Pharrell Williams and boy band NSYNC. The instrumentation is kept in a lower sound to highlight Bieber's vocals. However, critics dismissed the lyrics as immature and silly. "Boyfriend" was a commercial success, debuting at number two on the Billboard Hot 100 after selling a total of 521,000 digital units of the single. The song has the sixth-highest-ever debut digital sales week in the United States and has also charted at number 9 on the Pop Songs component chart. It also debuted at number one in Canada and number two in the United Kingdom.

Island Records initially commissioned a music video to be directed by Colin Tilley; however, the video was later scrapped and re-shot with Director X. Released on May 3, 2012, the video broke the VEVO record for having the most views in a 24-hour period with 8.00 million, later bested by One Direction's "Live While We're Young" (8.24 million). As part of promotion for the song, Bieber performed "Boyfriend" in a number of live appearances, including at the second-season finale of The Voice, and at the 2012 Billboard Music Awards. The rapping duo Ying Yang Twins also released a remixed version of the track with new verses added. Another remix of "Boyfriend" features 2 Chainz, Mac Miller and Asher Roth.

== Background and artwork ==
"Because I'm an artist myself, I can be pretty selective on who I produce for and who I make beats for and really what I'm looking for is an amazing vocalist, somebody that can sing better than I can. And the other thing is somebody that's willing to not try to make something that succeeds within the matrix of what pop music is now, but makes something that moves that matrix to where it is, and Justin was willing to take that leap with me."

— Posner talks about working with Bieber.

In late 2011, Bieber confirmed to radio network Capital FM that he was recording material for his third studio album, which was originally going to be released in early 2012. He later spoke to MTV News and revealed that Believe would surprise people in different ways, since it musically is a departure from his previous works. "Boyfriend" was written by Bieber, Michael Posner, Mason D. Levy and Matthew Musto. During an interview with radio DJ Bootleg Kev, Posner revealed that he was impressed with Bieber's work ethic, and further commented, "he's super talented. At first I didn't know what to expect because he's super young, but dude can write." Posner said that people would "flip" over the beat and that radio stations would want to play the song. Levy also commented on the track, and described it as "definitely edgier, it's more grown-up, it's more developed and it's sexier." Prior to the song's release, it had been previewed by several industry insiders, including radio host Mick Lee of WZFT, who said that the song was "so much different than his previous music.

On March 1, 2012, Bieber was featured as a guest on The Ellen DeGeneres Show, where he announced that the song would be officially released on March 26. He said, "My big announcement is that on March 26, my first single is coming out and it's called 'Boyfriend.' The song, it's basically I'm talking to this girl, [saying] if I was your boyfriend, I would never let you go. We wrote it, and the verses I'm talking/ rapping and then on the hook I'm singing. It's a really awesome song." Bieber also previewed the song's introduction on the show. Through his Twitter account, the singer released a poll in which fans were allowed to choose between two artworks for the single. Jessica Sager of Pop Crush noted that Bieber sports a mature look on both covers, using Elvis Presley's hair style and wearing a white t-shirt underneath a short sleeved, navy and white plaid button down with a thin chain necklace. The winning artwork was revealed on March 19, 2012.

== Composition ==
"Boyfriend"
A 17-second sample of the song's introduction features Bieber rapping using a lower-register and breathy vocals. The composition is similar to Justin Timberlake songs, while the lyrics were deemed as immature and silly.

"Boyfriend" is a R&B influenced track that lasts for two minutes and 52 seconds, which incorporates elements of acoustic music, hip hop, while still having club beats. The song was written in the key of B♭ minor with vocals spanning from A♭_{3} to D♭_{6} and its tempo is 97 beats per minute. The song opens with Bieber using a lower-register and breathy vocals while rapping, "If I was your boyfriend, I'd never let you go/ I can take you places you ain't never been before/Baby, take a chance or you'll never ever know/ I got money in my hands that I'd really like to blow/ Swag, swag, swag on you/Chilling by the fire while we eatin' fondue." As the chorus follows, he adopts a falsetto similar to Michael Jackson, and sings about being "everything you want".

The instrumentation, produced by Posner and Levy, infuses hand claps and Pharrell Williams similar style beats, and, as noted by Pop Crush reviewer Amy Sciaretto, "is kept to a minimum, allowing The Biebs' voice, which has strengthened and deepened as he matures and grows up, to shine and take center stage." Sciaretto also thought that "Boyfriend" is similar to Timberlake's song "Cry Me a River" (2002), while it was perceived by Robbie Daw of Idolator as a homage to the early 1990s. Jody Rosen of Rolling Stone dismissed the lyrical content, and summarized it as "Justin Has Actually Had Sexual Intercourse – But He Won't Harm Your Nine-Year-Old." Spin writer Marc Hogan said that the lyrics have references to several tracks, including Beyoncé's "Party" (2011), Britney Spears' "Till the World Ends" (2011), and Janet Jackson's "If" (1993). Andrew Hampp of Billboard said that "the club-ready beat and guitar-plucked chorus" recalls 'N Sync's final single "Girlfriend" (2002), and compared it to early songs by Justin Timberlake and Usher. Despite being influenced by Timberlake, Bieber strongly disapproved of the Timberlake comparison, stating in an interview on Mojo in the Morning: "That's crazy because our voices sound nothing alike. I mean, I'm not trying to sound like anyone. Saying I sound like someone else is not really a compliment".

== Critical reception ==
"Boyfriend" has received positive reviews. Andrew Hampp of Billboard rated it 82 out of 100, stating that Bieber sounds more adult than ever, but noted that most of his fans are still 12-year-old girls. Amy Sciaretto of Pop Crush praised the track, and said that the result of trying new music styles resulted on "a more mature, more well-rounded Justin Bieber song." Jenna Hally Rubenstein of MTV said that "Boyfriend" is "crazy dope", and realized that the lyrics are directed to the things Bieber does with his current girlfriend Selena Gomez. Becca Grim of Rolling Stone thought that the song is "edgier-than-usual," while Artistdirect reviewer Breña Brandano said that "Boyfriend" not only marks Bieber's transition to an adult, but also deemed it as a "new dawn for pop." Marc Hogan of magazine Spin said that Bieber "wants to sex you up" with the track, but thought that "Bieber might be a wealthy suitor, but he's not grown up just yet." A Rap-Up reviewer complimented "Boyfriend" for showcasing a mature Bieber and urban sound on it. The A.V. Club editors Steven Hyden and Genevieve Koski rated the song an A−, complimenting its production and vocals and considering it "irresistible, and when Bieber launches into that Timberlakian falsetto, it all feels pretty perfect." They also ranked it among his best singles, although they criticized its lyrical content.

Jordan Zakarin of The Hollywood Reporter described the song as a "more or less a proposition, with Bieber outlining both solid small town date ideas and eternal promises." Raju Mudhar of Toronto Star commented that, lyrically, Bieber is "nowhere near bringing 'SexyBack', but sounds like he's love to walk home holding your hand." Jody Rosen of Rolling Stone also rated it three out of five stars, and, while seeing its background as "expertly calculated to ease the Biebs' transition from tweenpop dreamboat to post-tweenpop dreamboat", questioned, "how can a song that begins with Bieber rapping in his thickest patois about his "swag" not be hater-bait?" About.com critic Bill Lamb considered it a "simplistic song derivative of Justin Timberlake", and stated that the lyrics does not have "substance to expand into an entire song." HitFix blogger Chris Eggertsen thought that "Boyfriend" is lyrically the same song Bieber has sung since his career first started, but noted that none of his fans would notice such aspect. Gregory Hicks of The Michigan Daily commented that Bieber is copying Timberlake's R&B style on the song, and described the lyrics as original "in the sense that few artists are willing to introduce this much poetic stupidity into their music.". RedEye's Ernest Wilkins said that Bieber doesn't know how to rap well, adding that "I yearn for the days of the Wahlberg men being the most awkward white male rappers on Earth."

== Chart performance ==
A few hours after its release, "Boyfriend" reached the top position on the US iTunes Store. According to Keith Caulfied of Billboard, industry sources suggested that the track could sell around 400,000 downloads by the end of the tracking week on April 1, 2012, and noted that it could debut into the top five of the Hot 100 chart. The song debuted at number two on the chart, only being held off the top spot by "We Are Young" by Fun. featuring Janelle Monáe. It sold a total of 521,000 digital units, the sixth-highest-ever debut digital sales week. Bill Werde of Billboard noted that it failed to debut at number one because the digital download of the track was only available through iTunes Store, "restricting the buying option for those that do not frequent the Apple retail store." The song has sold 3,216,000 downloads in the US by December 2012. "Boyfriend" is also Bieber's first single to ever reach the top position on the Canadian Hot 100 by debuting at number one and staying on for one week.

In the United Kingdom, the song debuted at number two with sales of 54,817 on the week ending April 15, 2012, held off from achieving his first number one in the country by fellow Canadian and his own protégée, Carly Rae Jepsen, with her single "Call Me Maybe". The track was also able to reach the top ten in Denmark, Ireland, Netherlands, Norway, and Sweden, while attaining top twenty positions in Belgium (Flanders), France, Finland, Germany, Spain, and Switzerland. In Australia, "Boyfriend" debuted and peak at number five on the chart issue dated April 8, 2012. The track failed to reach the top position in New Zealand, where it debuted and peaked at number two.

== Promotion ==
=== Music video ===
Island Def Jam Music Group commissioned a music video to be directed by Colin Tilley, who previously worked with Bieber on the music video for "U Smile" (2010). Filming sessions occurred on the week of March 28, 2012, and took place in a studio located in California. Bieber revealed that the music video doesn't have a "steady concept," adding that it mostly features artistic shots intercalated with dance scenes. He continued to explain, "It's not like 'Justin follows this girl to this spot.' No, it's a bunch of amazing scenes: Like a fire scene, we have an ice scene." On April 3, 2012, a teaser of the clip was unveiled by Bieber. Becky Bain of Idolator revealed that the following number of teasers featured Bieber "being groped by several female hands, dancing in front of a large white spotlight a la Michael Jackson, [and] posing menacingly in front of a fire and floating underwater." Nicola Sia also of Idolator considered the scenes where the singer "provocatively whispering into girls' ears" as too "erotic".

However, it was later reported that the music video directed by Tilley was scrapped, and re-shot with Director X on the week of April 21, 2012. The second version of the video premiered on May 3, 2012, on MTV. Director X summarized the synopsis of the video saying, "it was just cars and the simplicity that they liked. Cars, girls, just young people hanging out, having fun, that kind of thing. When I heard it, I thought that's what it should be."

Brogan Driscoll of The Huffington Post wrote that Bieber "shows he's all grown up, driving fast cars and taking one rather scantily-clad young lady into his arms". James Montgomery of MTV News wrote that "Filled with cool clothes, hot cars and even hotter women, 'Boyfriend' is the stuff of every newly minted heterosexual adult's dreams only on overdrive" and added that "It's a cool, confident clip, and, given where he's at right now, it's also an important one." Bruna Nessif of E! Online shortly commented that Bieber "is not a little boy anymore" in the music video for the song. Upon release, the video broke the VEVO record for having the most views in a 24-hour period with 8.00 million. The previous records were held by Nicki Minaj's "Stupid Hoe" (4.8 million) and Rihanna's "Where Have You Been" (4.9 million). Released on 20 September 2012, the video for One Direction's "Live While We're Young" garnered 8.24 million views in a 24-hour period, thus besting Bieber's record (8.00 million).

=== Live performances ===
As part of promotion for the song, Bieber performed "Boyfriend" at the second-season finale of The Voice, concluding with a choreographed routine reminiscent of Janet Jackson's "Rhythm Nation". It was also performed at the 2012 Billboard Music Awards and on Germany's Next Top Model. Bieber performed "Boyfriend" at the Capital FM Summertime Ball 2012. For the performance, he sported fingerless gloves, a Union Jack tank with matching vest, and jeans. The singer also performed the track during a promotional concert in Europe on June 4, 2012, along with "All Around the World" and "Die in Your Arms". Bieber performed the song for the first time after a year at the 2015 Wango Tango.

== Cover versions and remixes ==
In 2012, the song was also covered by metalcore band Issues on Punk Goes Pop 5.

In 2012, actor Jaden Smith, who is also a friend of Bieber, has made a remix to the song entitled "Flame (Just Cuz)".

Another remix featuring Mac Miller, Asher Roth and 2 Chainz was released on May 24, 2012.

On April 18, 2012, Marina and the Diamonds covered the song during a performance at BBC Radio 1's Live Lounge. During the performance, she changed the lyrics of the song and according to Jeff Benjamin of Billboard magazine, "have put a completely different spin on his track, turning The Bieb's latest into a dark, acoustic lament".

In 2012, Kevin McHale and Darren Criss (as their characters Artie Abrams and Blaine Anderson) performed the song in a mash-up with Britney Spears' song "Boys" in episode "Britney 2.0" of musical TV series Glee.

The rapping duo Ying Yang Twins remixed "Boyfriend" on the week of May 10, 2012. D-Roc, one of the members, explained that after his friends compared Bieber's song to their song "Wait (The Whisper Song)" (2005), "I was so amped up to hear the song too. When I actually did, I listened to it and I was like, it sounded like us. He complimented us," he said. "So I wanted to compliment him by getting on it."

A mashup of "Boyfriend" and 'N Sync's 2002 single "Girlfriend" was uploaded on YouTube by mashup artist Raheem on July 13, 2012, and quickly became a viral video.

== Track listings ==
- Digital download and CD single
1. "Boyfriend" – 3:31
- Digital download – Remixes
1. "Boyfriend" (Oliver Twizt Radio) – 3:44
2. "Boyfriend" (Oliver Twizt Club) – 4:27
3. "Boyfriend" (Oliver Twizt Instrumental) – 4:27
4. "Boyfriend" (Vice Radio) – 3:08
5. "Boyfriend" (Vice Club) - 4:46
6. "Boyfriend" (Vice Instrumental) – 4:46
7. "Boyfriend" (Joe Gauthreaux & Peter Barona Full Vocal Club) – 6:58
8. "Boyfriend" (Joe Gauthreaux Dark Dub) – 7:46
- Digital download – Boyfriend (Dada Life Remix)
1. "Boyfriend" (Dada Life Remix) – 5:32

== Credits and personnel ==
Recording

- Recorded at Chalice Recording Studios, Hollywood, Los Angeles and in London, England
- Mixed at Larrabee Studios, Burbank, California

Personnel

- Justin Bieber – vocals, songwriter
- Mike Posner – songwriter, producer, keyboards
- Mason "MdL" Levy – songwriter, producer
- Matthew Musto (blackbear) – songwriter, guitar production
- Kuk Harrell – vocal producer
- Josh Gudwin – engineer
- Chris "TEK" O'Ryan – engineer
- Thomas Cullison – assistant engineer
- Manny Marroquin – mixer
- Chris Galland – assistant mixer
- Del Bowers – assistant mixer
- Benny Steele – guitar recording

== Charts ==
=== Weekly charts ===
Chart (2012–2013)	Peak position
Australia (ARIA)	5
Austria (Ö3 Austria Top 40)	34
Belgium (Ultratop 50 Flanders)	18
Belgium (Ultratop 50 Wallonia)	20
Canada Hot 100 (Billboard)	1
Canada CHR/Top 40 (Billboard)	9
Canada Hot AC (Billboard)	18
Denmark (Tracklisten)	10
Finland (Suomen virallinen lista)	12
France (SNEP)	17
Germany (GfK)	16
Greece Digital Songs (Billboard)	10
Honduras (Honduras Top 50)	10
Hungary (Rádiós Top 40)	24
Ireland (IRMA)	9
Italy (FIMI)	22
Japan Hot 100 (Billboard)	53
Lebanon (Lebanese Top 20)	1
Mexico (Billboard Mexican Airplay)	28
Netherlands (Dutch Top 40 Tipparade)	2
Netherlands (Single Top 100)	8
New Zealand (Recorded Music NZ)	2
Norway (VG-lista)	2
Portugal Digital Song Sales (Billboard)	9
Romania (Romanian Top 100)	88
Scottish Singles Sales (Official Charts)	4
Spain (Promusicae)	15
Sweden (Sverigetopplistan)	7
Switzerland (Schweizer Hitparade)	19
UK Singles (Official Charts)	2
US Billboard Hot 100	2
US Adult Pop Airplay (Billboard)	34
US Dance Club Songs (Billboard)	12
US Hot R&B/Hip-Hop Songs (Billboard)	52
US Pop Airplay (Billboard)	9
US Rhythmic Airplay (Billboard)	6

Chart (2026)	Peak position
Global 200 (Billboard)	142
Greece International (IFPI)	35

=== Year-end charts ===
Chart (2012)	Peak position
Australia (ARIA)	62
Belgium (Ultratop Flanders)	66
Belgium (Ultratop Wallonia)	86
Brazil (Crowley)	39
Canada (Canadian Hot 100)	35
France (SNEP)	127
Germany (Media Control AG)	95
New Zealand (Recorded Music NZ)	29
Sweden (Sverigetopplistan)	61
UK Singles (OCC)	90
US Billboard Hot 100	28
US Mainstream Top 40 (Billboard)	36
US Rhythmic (Billboard)	32

== Certifications and sales ==
Certifications and sales for "Boyfriend"
Region	Certification	Certified units/sales
Australia (ARIA)	5× Platinum	350,000^{‡}
Brazil (Pro-Música Brasil)	Diamond	250,000^{‡}
Canada (Music Canada)	3× Platinum	240,000^{*}
Denmark (IFPI Danmark)	2× Platinum	180,000^{‡}
Germany (BVMI)	Platinum	300,000^{‡}
Mexico (AMPROFON)	Platinum	60,000^{*}
New Zealand (RMNZ)	2× Platinum	30,000^{*}
Norway (IFPI Norway)	2× Platinum	20,000^{*}
Sweden (GLF)	Gold	20,000^{‡}
United Kingdom (BPI)	Platinum	600,000^{‡}
United States (RIAA)	6× Platinum	3,216,000
Streaming
Denmark (IFPI Danmark)	Platinum	1,800,000^{†}
Greece (IFPI Greece)	Gold	1,000,000^{†}
^{*} Sales figures based on certification alone.^{‡} Sales+streaming figures based on certification alone.^{†} Streaming-only figures based on certification alone.

== Release history ==
Country	Date	Format	Label
Various	March 26, 2012	Digital download	The Island Def Jam Music Group
United States	March 27, 2012	Mainstream airplay	The Island Def Jam Music Group
Germany	April 20, 2012	CD single	The Island Def Jam Music Group
France	May 7, 2012	CD single	The Island Def Jam Music Group
United Kingdom	May 21, 2012	CD single	Mercury Records
United States	June 12, 2012	Digital download – Remixes	Island Records; Raymond Braun Media Group; Schoolboy Records
