= As Long as You Love Me (Justin Bieber song) =

Single by Justin Bieber featuring Big Sean

from the album Believe
- Released: July 10, 2012
- Recorded: 2012
- Genre: Electropop; dubstep
- Length: 3:49 (album version); 3:20 (international version)
- Label: Island; RBMG; Schoolboy
- Songwriters: Andre Lindal; Justin Bieber; Nasri Atweh; Rodney Jerkins; Sean Anderson
- Producers: Darkchild; Andre Lindal

Justin Bieber singles chronology
"Boyfriend" (2012)	"As Long as You Love Me" (2012)	"Beauty and a Beat" (2012)

Big Sean singles chronology
"My Homies Still" (2012)	"As Long as You Love Me" (2012)	"Clique" (2012)

Music video
- "As Long as You Love Me" on YouTube

"As Long as You Love Me" is a song by Canadian singer Justin Bieber from his third studio album, Believe (2012). The track features American rapper Big Sean. It was first released on July 10, 2012, as a promotional single from the album, and one month later, it was released as the album's second single.

The song has since charted in the United Kingdom, first at number thirty as a promotional single with first-week sales of 11,598, and then after being released as a single it improved its position on the UK Singles Chart, reaching number 22. On Billboard's Rhythmic Airplay Chart, the single reached number one, giving Bieber his first number one single on an American airplay music chart. It peaked at number six on the Billboard Hot 100. It also reached the top ten in Australia, Canada, Denmark, Lebanon, New Zealand, and Norway.

It also reached the number one position on Billboard's Dance/Mix Show Airplay chart, making Bieber the fifth Canadian artist to reach that position after Martin Solveig featuring Dragonette's "Hello" in 2011. The song has sold 2,240,000 copies in the US as of December 2012. The accompanying music video, directed by Anthony Mandler, premiered on Bieber's official YouTube page on August 1, 2012, and features guest appearances by Sean and Michael Madsen.

== Background and release ==
In late 2011, Bieber confirmed to radio network Capital FM that he was recording material for his third studio album, which was originally going to be released in early 2012. He later spoke to MTV News and revealed that Believe would surprise people in different ways, since it musically is a departure from his previous works. While Bieber has said that he wants his next release to recall Justin Timberlake's FutureSex/LoveSounds sonically, in an interview with V magazine, he noted that what he would be singing is "a bit more PG" than the topics Timberlake covered on that album:

"I'm not going to try to conform to what people want me to be or go out there and start partying, have people see me with alcohol. I want to do it at my own pace. I don't want to start singing about things like sex, drugs and swearing. I'm into love, and maybe I'll get more into making love when I'm older. I want to be someone who is respected by everybody."

After releasing "Boyfriend" as the lead single, Bieber announced that he will release promotional singles to promote Believe. The first promotional single "Die in Your Arms" was released to iTunes on May 29, 2012. The second "All Around The World" was released on iTunes on June 4, 2012. "As Long as You Love Me" was released on June 11, 2012, as the third and final promotional single.

The cover art for "As Long as You Love Me" shows Bieber perched on a wooden stool, holding an acoustic guitar. Sia Nicole of Idolator expressed dissatisfaction with the cover, saying "It’s false advertising for the high-fidelity track that has nary a strum within earshot."

== Composition and lyrics ==
"As Long as You Love Me" was written by Bieber, Nasri Atweh, and guest vocalist Big Sean, while production was handled by Darkchild, The Messengers and Andre Lindal. The song is officially written in the key of C minor, with vocals spanning from F_{3} to C_{6} and a tempo of 140 beats per minute. It is heavily influenced by dubstep, with vocal loops complemented by a booming beat. As the song continues, it builds and builds to a Rave-ready drop.

Lyrically, it tells listeners that true love can defy all circumstances and the obstacles that it can overcome. "As long as you love me/ We could be starving/ We could be homeless/ We could be broke," Bieber sings over a staccato beat and handclaps, with an undercurrent of a swirling-sounding synth. "As long as you love me/ I'll be your platinum/ I'll be your silver/ I'll be your gold," he adds. Big Sean drops a rap exalting a lady love, too. "I don't know if this makes sense, but you're my hallelujah/ Give me a time and a place, and I'll rendezvous, and I'll fly you to it," Sean raps.

== Critical reception ==
The song received critical acclaim by music critics. Jon Caramanica of The New York Times described the song as "a dubstep love song, with Mr. Bieber reaching into falsetto at points without losing power, and showing restraint at the chorus." Natalie Shaw of BBC Music wrote, "It's fine that his vocal simpers on the verses of As Long As You Love Me, because the song's pulsating undercurrent propels it onto the dancefloor." Hermione Hoby of The Observer complimented his vocals, calling "plaintive and still unmistakably teenage." Jason Lipshutz of Billboard defined the track: "A massive yet somehow intimate dance track, with the drums almost reaching hair metal levels in their vibrations. The Biebs handles his business, but Big Sean's verse probably isn't necessary."

Becky Bain of Idolator commented, "The electro-infused track carries your basic we-don’t-need-money-we-have-love sentiment, while Big Sean cameo is mostly useless, but it does come at a pivotal moment in the Darkchild-produced tune."

In his review for Fact Magazine, Alex Macpherson described the track:

"'As Long As You Love Me' is a post-austerity, us-against-the-world electronic storm in which Bieber promises romantic fealty even as he's buffeted this way and that by a cornucopia of sonic switch-ups courtesy of Darkchild: the 4×4 march leading up to the peak of the second chorus, the way the word 'love' is caught, cut up and tossed into a digital swirl until it becomes helpless surrender. Notably and surprisingly, too, Bieber's own delivery stands out: his blend of puppy-eyed pleading and genuine tenderness on the line 'We could be homeless, we could be broke' is the song's emotional pivot. It's enough to make you jealous of those terrifyingly devoted Beliebers: imagine how much more intensely they’re feeling this."

== Music video ==
As part of promotion for "As Long As You Love Me," a music video, which was filmed in early July 2012, was released. Prior to the release of the video, Bieber revealed that a minute-long clip of the video was due to be broadcast following an episode of America's Got Talent; however, much to the displeasure of Bieber and his fans, the clip wasn't shown. NBC later revealed that technical difficulties prevented the clip from being aired. The full video was later premiered on Bieber's official YouTube page on August 1, 2012. Bieber very rarely referred to the video as a "music video," but rather as a "short film." Directed by Anthony Mandler, cinematography by David Devlin, and edited by Jacquelyn London, the video was Bieber's longest music video at five minutes and fifty-two seconds, before being surpassed by "Confident" at six minutes and six seconds. It featured guest appearances by Michael Madsen and Big Sean, the latter of which performs the rapping on the track. The video was filmed in Los Angeles, California. The actress in the music video is Chanel Celaya.

=== Synopsis ===
The video starts with a flashback to an overprotective father telling Bieber to stay away from his daughter, whom Bieber is dating. In the present, Bieber walks up to a payphone and tries to call his girlfriend, but she does not answer. Bieber is then seen dancing outside the mansion of his girlfriend's father, and running through the corridors in a panic. When he realizes she isn't there, he drives off in his car to find her. As he finds her in her bedroom, they stare at each other through the glass windows. Bieber then sneaks her out of her bedroom and hurries her into his car, just as her father sees him. He drives down the freeway for a few miles, with his girlfriend's father close behind, then finally pulls over. As Bieber steps out of the car, the man viciously beats him. It is then revealed, through a series of flashbacks, the father was, in fact, jealous that his daughter cared more about Bieber than him. The video ends with a bloodied Bieber looking into the camera.

Throughout the video, scenes of Justin and his love interest spending quality times in various scenes (such as on her bed, at the park and on a rooftop) are shown, displaying their love for each other.

== Live performances ==
Bieber performed the song for the first time in Oslo, Norway, at the Oslo Opera House, on May 30, 2012, at his Believe promo tour. Also Bieber performed the song, with Big Sean, on the Today Show on June 15, 2012, and again with Big Sean at the 2012 Teen Choice Awards, in a medley with "Boyfriend". Bieber also performed the song, once again with Big Sean, during the season finale of the NBC summer reality talent show America's Got Talent. He also performed in late September on Dancing with the Stars, and on the February 9, 2013, episode of Saturday Night Live, which he also hosted. Bieber has also performed the song on the 2012 Victoria's Secret Fashion show on November 7, 2012, in a medley with "Boyfriend". On March 28, 2015, Bieber performed a duet with Ariana Grande on The Honeymoon Tour in Miami. Bieber performed the song at the 2015 Wango Tango. On April 18, 2026, Bieber performed the song with Big Sean again during Coachella 2026, along with "No Pressure", from his 2015 album Purpose, another track featuring Big Sean.

== Track listings ==
Digital download
No.	Title	Length
1.	"As Long As You Love Me" (featuring Big Sean)	3:49

Digital download – Remixes EP
No.	Title	Length
1.	"As Long As You Love Me" (Ferry Corsten Remix)	5:42
2.	"As Long As You Love Me" (Ferry Corsten Club Dub)	4:58
3.	"As Long As You Love Me" (Ferry Corsten Radio Mix)	3:31
4.	"As Long As You Love Me" (Audiobot Remix)	5:04
5.	"As Long As You Love Me" (Audiobot Instrumental)	5:04
6.	"As Long As You Love Me" (Audiobot Radio Mix)	3:55
7.	"As Long As You Love Me" (Paulo & Jackinsky Club Mix)	7:41
8.	"As Long As You Love Me" (Paulo & Jackinsky Dub)	7:26
9.	"As Long As You Love Me" (Paulo & Jackinsky Radio Mix)	3:55
10.	"As Long As You Love Me" (featuring Big Sean) (Audien Dubstep Radio Mix)	4:03
11.	"As Long As You Love Me" (featuring Big Sean) (Audien Dubstep Mix)	4:37
12.	"As Long As You Love Me" (featuring Big Sean) (Audien Luvstep Mix)	4:37

== Charts ==
=== Weekly charts ===
Weekly chart performance for "As Long as You Love Me"
Chart (2012–2014)	Peak position
Australia (ARIA)	8
Austria (Ö3 Austria Top 40)	63
Belgium (Ultratop 50 Flanders)	31
Belgium (Ultratop 50 Wallonia)	41
Canada Hot 100 (Billboard)	9
Canada CHR/Top 40 (Billboard)	2
Canada Hot AC (Billboard)	22
Czech Republic Airplay (ČNS IFPI)	52
Denmark (Tracklisten)	6
Finland (Suomen virallinen lista)	18
France (SNEP)	48
Germany (GfK)	38
Ireland (IRMA)	28
Italy (FIMI)	38
Lebanon (OLT20)	4
Mexico Ingles Airplay (Billboard)	17
Netherlands (Single Top 100)	33
New Zealand (Recorded Music NZ)	6
Norway (VG-lista)	4
Russia Airplay (TopHit)	48
Slovakia Airplay (ČNS IFPI)	40
Spain (Promusicae)	37
Sweden (Sverigetopplistan)	23
Switzerland (Schweizer Hitparade)	55
UK Singles (Official Charts)	22
US Billboard Hot 100	6
US Adult Pop Airplay (Billboard)	27
US Dance Club Songs (Billboard)	13
US Dance Airplay (Billboard)	1
US Pop Airplay (Billboard)	3
US Rhythmic Airplay (Billboard)	1

Chart (2026)	Peak position
Greece International (IFPI)	83

=== Year-end charts ===
2012 year-end chart performance for "As Long as You Love Me"
Chart (2012)	Position
Australia (ARIA)	78
Brazil (Crowley)	84
Canada (Canadian Hot 100)	48
New Zealand (Recorded Music NZ)	37
Russia Airplay (TopHit)	179
UK Singles (Official Charts Company)	136
US Billboard Hot 100	34
US Dance/Mix Show Airplay (Billboard)	29
US Mainstream Top 40 (Billboard)	28
US Rhythmic (Billboard)	21

== Certifications ==
Certifications and sales for "As Long as You Love Me"
Region	Certification	Certified units/sales
Australia (ARIA)	5× Platinum	350,000^{‡}
Brazil (Pro-Música Brasil)	Diamond	250,000^{‡}
Canada (Music Canada)	2× Platinum	160,000^{*}
Denmark (IFPI Danmark)	Gold	15,000^{^}
Germany (BVMI)	Gold	150,000^{‡}
Mexico (AMPROFON)	Gold	30,000^{*}
New Zealand (RMNZ)	2× Platinum	30,000^{*}
Norway (IFPI Norway)	2× Platinum	20,000^{*}
Sweden (GLF)	Gold	20,000^{‡}
United Kingdom (BPI)	Platinum	600,000^{‡}
United States (RIAA)	5× Platinum	5,000,000^{‡}
Streaming
Denmark (IFPI Danmark)	2× Platinum	3,600,000^{†}
^{*} Sales figures based on certification alone.^{^} Shipments figures based on certification alone.^{‡} Sales+streaming figures based on certification alone.^{†} Streaming-only figures based on certification alone.

== Release history ==
=== Promotional releases ===
Promotional release dates for "As Long as You Love Me"
Region	Date	Format	Label
United States	June 11, 2012	Digital Download	Island Records
Canada	June 11, 2012	Digital Download	Island Records
France	June 11, 2012	Digital Download	Universal Music, Mercury Records
Worldwide	June 13, 2012	Digital Download	Universal Music, Mercury Records

=== Single releases ===
Single release dates for "As Long as You Love Me"
Region	Date	Format
United States/Canada	July 10, 2012	Top 40/Mainstream and Rhythmic radio
Worldwide	September 7, 2012	Digital Remixes EP
