= Jeremy Bieber =

Canadian film producer and father of Justin Bieber

- Bieber in a promotional image for The Traitors Canada (2026)
- Born: Jeremy Jack Bieber; June 4, 1975 (age 51); Stratford, Ontario, Canada
- Occupations: Film producer; television personality; businessman
- Spouse: Chelsey Rebelo (m. 2018)
- Partner: Pattie Mallette (1990–1994)
- Children: 5 (including Justin Bieber)

Jeremy Jack Bieber (born June 4, 1975) is a Canadian film producer, businessman, and television personality from Stratford, Ontario. He is the father of pop singer Justin Bieber and the former partner of author Pattie Mallette. He appeared in his son's documentary films Justin Bieber: Never Say Never (2011) and Justin Bieber's Believe (2013), and served as executive producer on Bodyguards: Secret Lives from the Watchtower (2016). In 2026, he appeared as a contestant on the fourth season of The Traitors Canada.

== Early life ==
Bieber was born on June 4, 1975, in Stratford, Ontario. His mother is a pianist who reportedly played informally with members of the Guess Who. An amateur musician himself, Bieber plays guitar and has performed in various bands. He later taught his son Justin to play classic rock on the guitar during his childhood.

Bieber began a relationship with Pattie Mallette around age 15. Their son, Justin Bieber, was born on March 1, 1994, in London, Ontario, shortly before Mallette turned 19. The couple separated not long after, and Justin was raised mainly by his mother.

== Career ==
=== Film ===
Bieber has production credits on several films connected to his son's career. He appeared as himself in Justin Bieber: Never Say Never (2011), a concert documentary about Justin's rise to fame, and again in Justin Bieber's Believe (2013). His work as a producer came with Bodyguards: Secret Lives from the Watchtower (2016), on which he served as executive producer.

=== Television ===
In 2026, Bieber joined the cast of the fourth season of The Traitors Canada, which premiered September 21 on CTV and Crave. The season was hosted by actress Karine Vanasse and filmed at the Manoir Rouville-Campbell in Quebec. Contestants compete for up to $100,000 in prize money. Bell Media's press materials listed Bieber's occupation as "Strategic Advisor / The Biebers' Dad."

=== Business ===
Bieber has run a construction company for over 15 years. In August 2008 he moved to Winnipeg, Manitoba, exploring potential business opportunities there, but returned to Stratford in early 2010 after those plans fell through.

== Personal life ==
Following his separation from Pattie Mallette, Bieber was in a relationship with Erin Wagner. The two have a daughter, Jazmyn (born May 30, 2008), and a son, Jaxon (born November 20, 2009, in Winnipeg). He later became engaged to Chelsey Rebelo on February 19, 2016, in Saint Barthélemy, and married her two years later on February 20, 2018, with Justin serving as a groomsman. Jeremy and Chelsey have a daughter, Bay (born August 16, 2018), and he is also stepfather to Chelsey's daughter Allie (born April 7, 2007).

== Filmography ==
Year	Title	Role
2011	Justin Bieber: Never Say Never	Himself
2013	Justin Bieber's Believe	Himself
2016	Bodyguards: Secret Lives from the Watchtower	Executive Producer
2026	The Traitors Canada (TV series)	Himself – Contestant

== Sources ==
- Vesely, Carolin (September 11, 2010). "From hitting the boards to hits on Billboard". Winnipeg Free Press.
- Mallette, Pattie (2012). Nowhere but Up. Revell.
- "Jeremy Bieber". IMDb.
- Buia, Natalia (September 10, 2026). "Justin Bieber's dad is now a reality TV star". Daily Hive.
- Shiffer, Emily J.; Aizin, Rebecca; Stutsman, Samantha (April 19, 2026). "Meet Justin Bieber's Parents, Pattie Mallette and Jeremy Bieber". People.
- Shiffer, Emily J.; Aizin, Rebecca (April 20, 2026). "Meet Justin Bieber's 4 Siblings, Allie, Jazmyn, Jaxon and Bay". People.
