= Pattie Mallette =

Mother of Justin Bieber

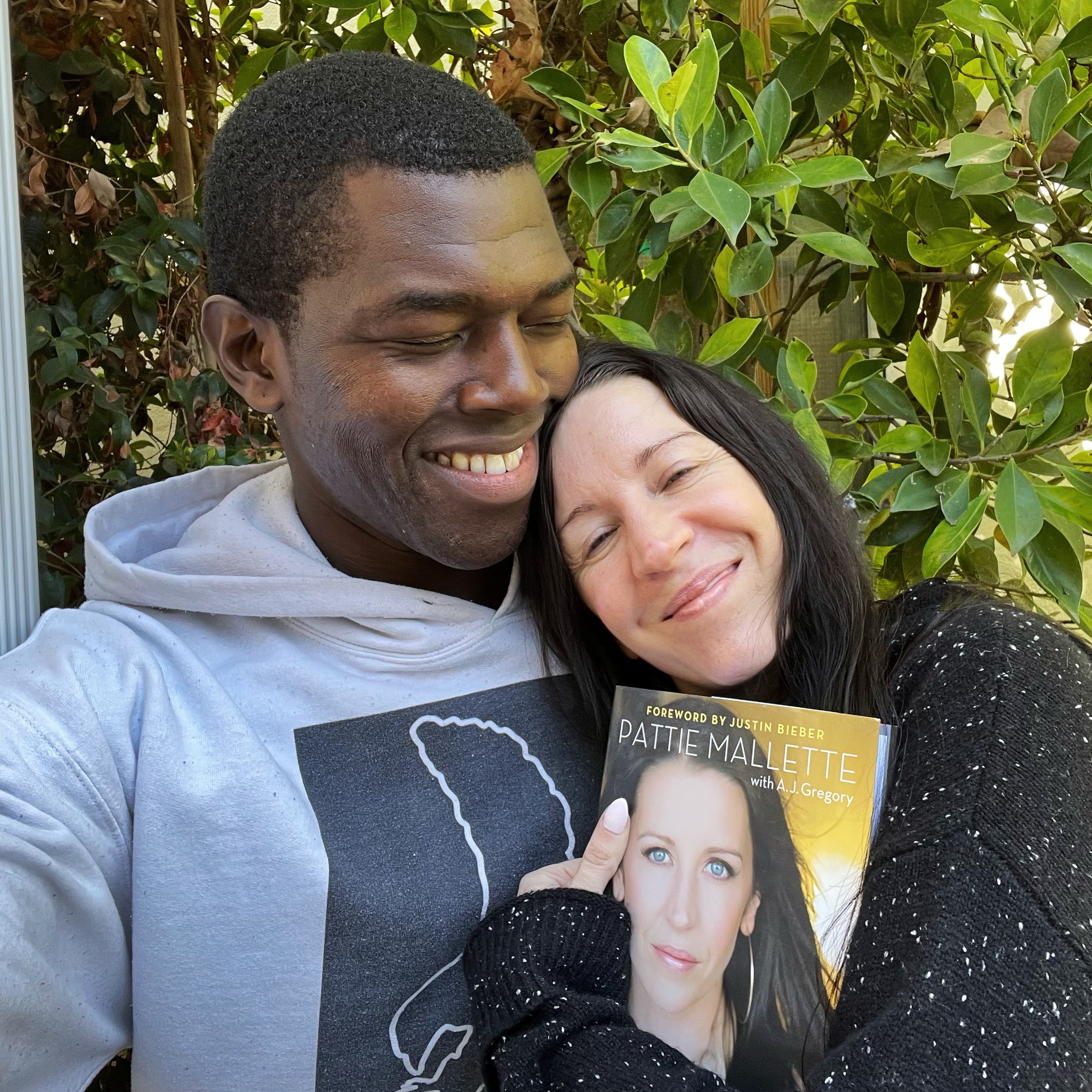
- Mallette beside singer LeRoy Mobley in 2021
- Born: Patricia Mallette; April 2, 1975 (age 51); Stratford, Ontario, Canada
- Occupation: Author
- Partner: Jeremy Bieber (1990–1994)
- Children: Justin Bieber
- Relatives: Hailey Bieber (daughter-in-law)
- Website: pattiemallette.com

Patricia Mallette (born April 2, 1975) is a Canadian author. She is the mother of Canadian singer Justin Bieber and the mother-in-law of Hailey Bieber. Mallette also managed her son's early career. Her autobiography, Nowhere but Up, was published in 2012 by Christian book publisher Revell, and was number 17 on The New York Times Best Seller list during its first week of release.

== Early life ==
=== Childhood ===
Pattie Mallette was born on April 2, 1975, in Stratford, Ontario, of French-Canadian descent. She is a daughter of Diane M. (née Henry; born 1950) and Michael Mallette (1947–1984). When Pattie was two years old, her older sister Sally, who was five years old at the time, was killed when she was struck by a vehicle while crossing the street. She also has an older brother named Chris.

Mallette has said her childhood was rattled with sexual abuse and violence and that she was first molested around age three. Mallette alleged that her offenders included a male babysitter, the grandfather of one of her friends and neighbourhood kids mature beyond their years. Her book describes sexual abuse continuing until she was 14, followed by an incident of date rape at age 15. She says of the sexual abuse and violence, "I was sexually violated so many times that as the years went by it began to feel normal. It's a strange marriage — knowing something is wrong yet at the same time finding it familiar and commonplace."

=== Teen years ===
As a child, Mallette showed an interest in acting and singing. At age nine, she began appearing on local television programs, including Romper Room and Big Top Talent, a locally televised children's talent show. When she was 10, Mallette was cast in two theatrical productions in the Stratford Shakespeare Festival, which brings over half a million tourists to the town every year. Throughout middle and high school, she took every drama and choir class available, along with seven years of dancing. After earning numerous trophies and awards for her singing and acting, Mallette was signed to a Toronto-based talent agent. When auditions required her to travel 1 1/2 hours to Toronto every weekend, her parents were unable to make the commitment, which left Mallette devastated.

At age 14, she began using drugs, including alcohol, marijuana and LSD. She also started shoplifting. When she vandalized school property by starting a fire in a bathroom, she was suspended from school. When Mallette was 15 years old, she began a relationship with Jeremy Bieber, which lasted for four years. She left home when she was 16, supporting herself through petty theft and drug dealing. During this time, Mallette experienced loneliness, depression and suicidal ideation. At 17, she attempted suicide by throwing herself in front of a truck, which led to a stint in a mental ward. Soon after, Mallette began to embrace Christianity.

Following her release from the hospital, Mallette rekindled friendships that failed to support her newfound faith, and reconnected with Jeremy Bieber. Six months later, she became pregnant. Mallette gave birth to her son, Justin, on March 1, 1994, in London, Ontario, one month before her 19th birthday. While Mallette and Jeremy Bieber initially maintained a relationship after the birth of their son, they split up and Mallette raised Justin with the help of her parents.

== Professional background ==
=== Music ===
Mallette encouraged her son's talents after he began showing an interest in music at the age of two. In 2007, she entered Justin in the local "Stratford Star" talent show where he sang Ne-Yo's song, "So Sick", finishing second in the competition. Mallette posted a video of the performance on YouTube for their family and friends to view and continued to upload videos of subsequent performances as her son's online popularity grew.

=== Writing ===
In September 2012, her autobiography (co-written with A.J. Gregory) Nowhere but Up was published by Christian book publisher Revell. The book is about the troubled upbringing of Mallette and the personal transformation of turning abandonment and single parenthood into strong faith and a life filled with grace and hope.

During the first week of release, it was listed at No. 17 on The New York Times Best Seller list. The book has received international press and has been reviewed by media outlets around the world.

== Filmography ==
Film and television appearances

- 2011: Biebermania! (documentary) – as herself
- 2011: Justin Bieber: Never Say Never (documentary) – as herself
- 2012: Today Show (television series) – as herself
- 2012: Weekend Today (television series) – as herself
- 2012: Huckabee (television series) – as herself
- 2012: The Hour (television series) – as herself
- 2013: Justin Bieber's Believe – as herself
- 2015: "Comedy Central Roast of Justin Bieber" (pre-show) – as herself

Film production

- 2012: To Write Love on Her Arms – executive producer
- 2013: Crescendo (short film) – executive producer

== Published works ==
- Mallette, Pattie; and A.J. Gregory (2012). Nowhere but Up: the Story of Justin Bieber's Mom, Revell, 220 pages. ISBN 978-0800721893
