= Robert Caplin =

American photographer and cinematographer

- Born: Athens, OH
- Occupations: American photographer and cinematographer
- Years active: 2002–present
- Website: robertcaplin.com

Robert Caplin is an American photographer and photojournalist. He is best known for his work photographing pop singer Justin Bieber.

== Life and career ==
Caplin grew up in Athens, Ohio, where he also graduated from Ohio University's School of Visual Communication in 2005.

In 2002, when he was 19, Caplin began an internship with The Columbus Dispatch and photographed a riot after an Ohio State University football game. He later got an internship at the Los Angeles Times, then one at The New York Times, where he became a regular contributor. Other outlets where Caplin contributed photographs include The Wall Street Journal, National Geographic, Sports Illustrated, and Newsweek.

In December 2009, The New York Times assigned Caplin to photograph a Justin Bieber concert in Madison Square Garden. Seeing Bieber's superstar potential, he worked with his girlfriend, designer Laia Prats, on a prototype documentary book about the singer, using photos from the concert. In June 2010, at Bieber's appearance on Today, Caplin showed Bieber and his team the prototype book and convinced them to work with him on it. HarperCollins published the book, Justin Bieber: First Step 2 Forever: My Story, in October 2010. The book spent 15 weeks on The New York Times Best Seller list. Caplin's video documentation of Bieber on tour was released as part of Paramount Pictures' movie Justin Bieber: Never Say Never.

On June 26, 2013, Caplin filed a copyright infringement lawsuit against gossip blogger Perez Hilton for allegedly publishing 14 of Caplin's photos of Glee actor Darren Criss on his own website without Caplin's permission. The case was settled out of court.
