= Justin Bieber: Believe =

Justin Bieber: Believe may refer to:

- Believe (Justin Bieber album), second studio album by Justin Bieber
- Justin Bieber's Believe, sequel film to Justin Bieber: Never Say Never
