= Billboard's Greatest Pop Stars =

Billboard artist ranking

The Greatest Pop Stars is an annual list ranking the most important and impactful music artists in the US, selected by a panel of editors of Billboard magazine. It differs from the Billboard Year-End Top Artist chart, which ranks artists based on statistical performances on the Billboard charts. The Greatest Pop Stars list is based on a more variety of factors, such as cultural importance, industry influence and overall omnipresence over popular music. The list was first published in 2019, with retrospective annual rankings back to 1981, the year MTV premiered, which Billboard noted as the start of "modern pop stardom". In 2024, Billboard published the Greatest Pop Stars of the 21st Century list, a ranking of 25 most important and impactful popular music artists from 2000 to 2024, with Beyoncé being listed at number one.

== History ==
In 2019, American music magazine Billboard began publishing a list of the greatest pop star of every year since 1981, with essay tributes for each artist. The first year of 1981 was chosen as "the year that forever changed modern stardom", with the premiere of MTV which established music videos as an essential element for popular music iconicity. In 2024, to mark the end of the first quarter of the 21st century, Billboard decided to make a list of the artists who have defined popular culture, music and stardom, and been the "most important and most impactful" over the period of 2000 to 2024.

== Criteria ==
The Greatest Pop Stars list is not exclusively determined using chart positions, streams or sales numbers. It also uses factors such as acclaimed works, music videos, live performances, social media presence, cultural importance, industry influence and overall omnipresence. The 21st century list are measured over the years of 2000 to 2024. Billboard used the term "pop star" in a broad definition, not only top-40 type pop music soloists, but also other popular music types of performers such as rappers, singer-songwriters, rock bands, or R&B groups.

== List of artists ==
=== By year ===
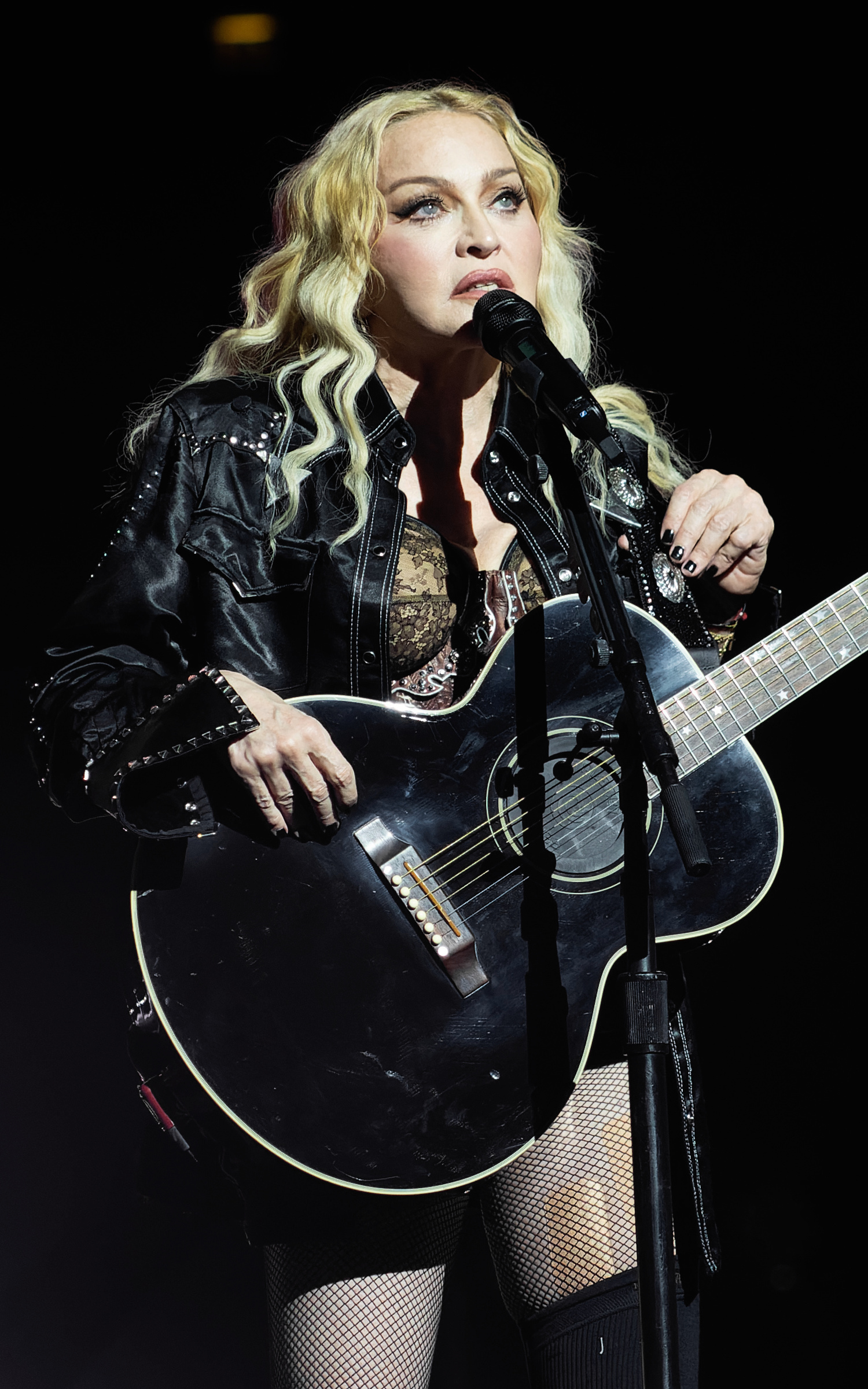
Madonna was the first artist to repeat as a year's Greatest Pop Star: 1985 and 1989.

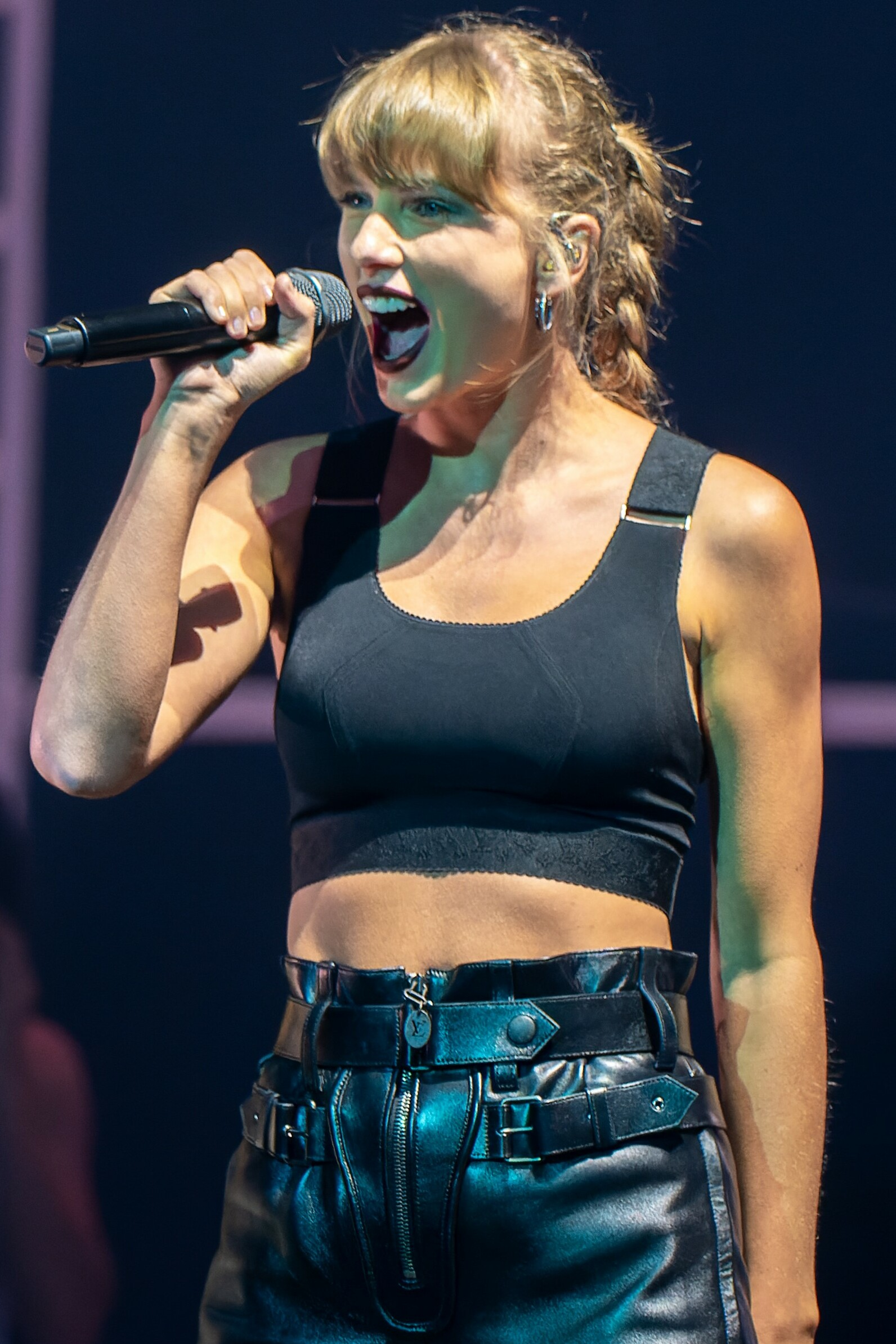
Taylor Swift was the first artist to be named the Greatest Pop Star three times (2015, 2021, and 2023).

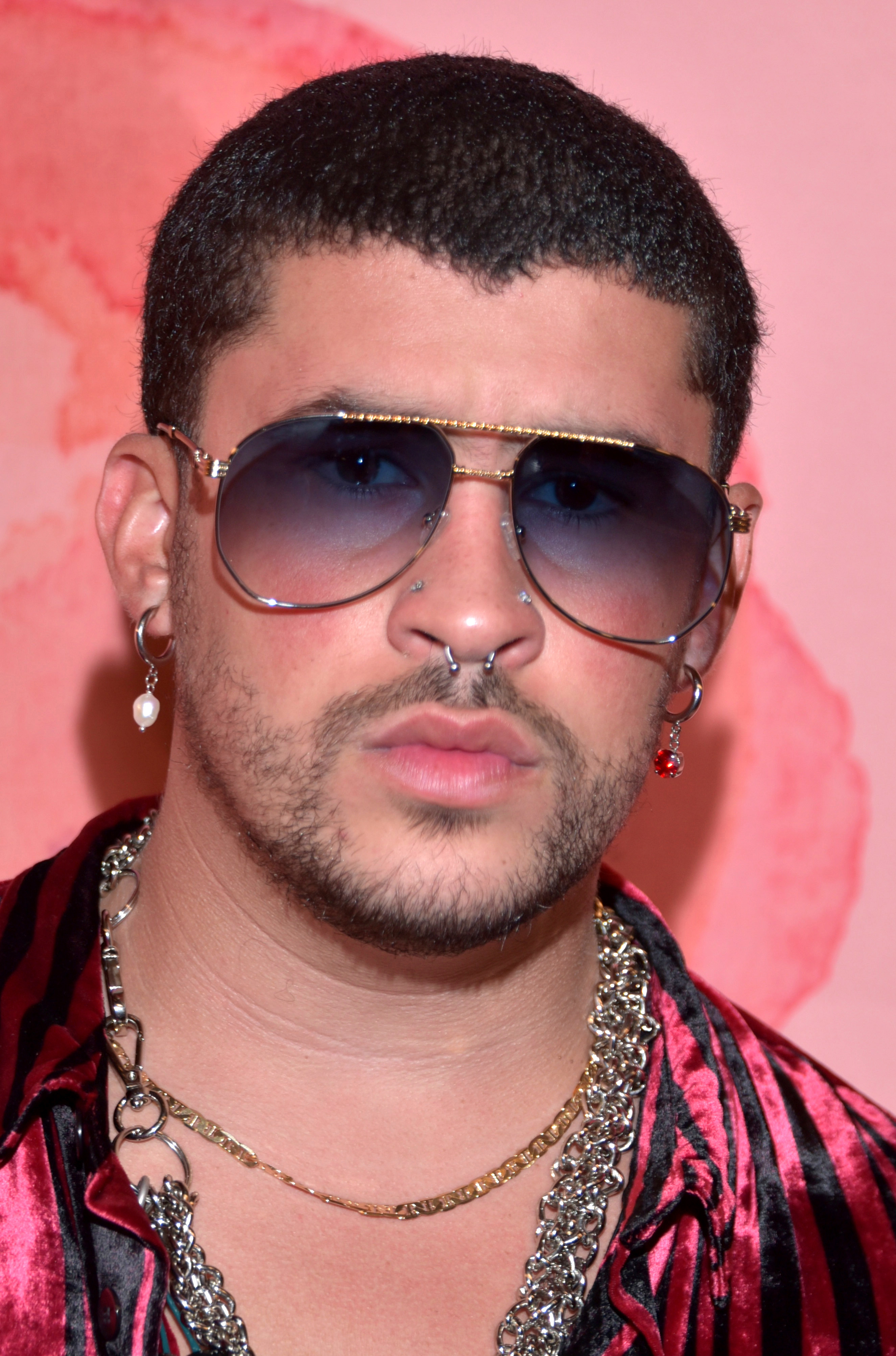
Bad Bunny was the first male artist to be named the Greatest Pop Star twice (2022 and 2025).

American singers Madonna, Janet Jackson, Beyoncé, Rihanna, and Taylor Swift are the only female acts to top multiple years, with Swift remaining the only one to top three different calendar years. Puerto Rican singer Bad Bunny is the only male act to top multiple years.

For each year's essay article, Billboard's staff writers also selected three honorable mentions, as well as a rookie of the year selection for "emerging pop stars then still new to the mainstream", and a comeback of the year selection for "veteran stars who had their first big year in a while". The 1996 essay is no longer hosted on Billboard's site.

Year	Pop star of the year	Honorable mentions	Rookie of the year	Comeback of the year	Ref.
1981	Blondie	Hall & Oates; Diana Ross; Olivia Newton-John	Juice Newton	Rick Springfield	
1982	John Cougar Mellencamp	The Go-Go's; Hall & Oates; Toto	Men at Work	Chicago	
1983	Michael Jackson	The Police; Lionel Richie; Billy Joel	Duran Duran	David Bowie	
1984	Prince	Cyndi Lauper; Bruce Springsteen; Wham!/George Michael	Madonna	Tina Turner	
1985	Madonna	Phil Collins; Bruce Springsteen; Tears for Fears	Whitney Houston	Aretha Franklin	
1986	Whitney Houston	Madonna; Janet Jackson; Prince	Miami Sound Machine	Aerosmith	
1987	Bon Jovi	Michael Jackson; U2; Whitney Houston	Debbie Gibson	Herb Alpert	
1988	George Michael	Def Leppard; Rick Astley; Michael Jackson	Guns N' Roses	George Harrison	
1989	Madonna	Janet Jackson; Bobby Brown; New Kids on the Block	Paula Abdul	The B-52s	
1990	Janet Jackson	New Kids on the Block; Madonna; Vanilla Ice	Wilson Phillips	Bonnie Raitt	
1991	Mariah Carey	Michael Jackson; Garth Brooks; Color Me Badd	Boyz II Men	Amy Grant	
1992	Nirvana	Boyz II Men; Whitney Houston; Guns N' Roses	TLC	Eric Clapton	
1993	Janet Jackson	Mariah Carey; Whitney Houston; Dr. Dre	Snoop Doggy Dogg	Meat Loaf	
1994	Boyz II Men	Ace of Base; Janet Jackson; Snoop Doggy Dogg	Sheryl Crow	Eagles	
1995	TLC	Mariah Carey; Boyz II Men; The Notorious B.I.G.	Hootie & The Blowfish	The Beatles	
1996	Alanis Morissette^{[a]}	Toni Braxton; Celine Dion; 2pac	Fugees	Keith Sweat	
1997	Puff Daddy	The Notorious B.I.G.; Hanson; Jewel	Spice Girls	Will Smith	
1998	Backstreet Boys	Shania Twain; Monica; Madonna	The Chicks	Brian Setzer	
1999	Britney Spears	Backstreet Boys; TLC; Ricky Martin	Eminem	Cher	
2000	NSYNC	Britney Spears; Eminem; Christina Aguilera	Nelly	Santana	
2001	Jennifer Lopez	Usher; Janet Jackson; Destiny's Child	Alicia Keys	Shaggy	
2002	Eminem	Ashanti; Nelly; Missy Elliott	Avril Lavigne	Kylie Minogue	
2003	Beyoncé	Outkast; Sean Paul; Justin Timberlake	50 Cent	Johnny Cash	
2004	Usher	Ciara; Maroon 5; Jay-Z	Kanye West	Green Day	
2005	Kanye West	Gwen Stefani; Kelly Clarkson; 50 Cent	Fall Out Boy	Mariah Carey	
2006	Justin Timberlake	Beyoncé; Rihanna; Fergie	Ne-Yo	Nelly Furtado	
2007	Rihanna	Fergie; Kanye West; Justin Timberlake	Amy Winehouse	Timbaland	
2008	Lil Wayne	Rihanna; Taylor Swift; Chris Brown	Katy Perry	Kid Rock	
2009	Lady Gaga	Beyoncé; Taylor Swift; Black Eyed Peas	Drake	Jason Mraz	
2010	Katy Perry	Lady Gaga; Kesha; Justin Bieber	Nicki Minaj	Sade	
2011	Adele	Katy Perry; Lady Gaga; LMFAO	Lana Del Rey	Jennifer Lopez	
2012	Rihanna	Maroon 5; Taylor Swift; Adele	One Direction	Madonna	
2013	Miley Cyrus	Pharrell; Macklemore & Ryan Lewis; Bruno Mars	Lorde	Daft Punk	
2014	Beyoncé	Ariana Grande; Katy Perry; Nicki Minaj	Iggy Azalea	John Legend	
2015	Taylor Swift	Drake; The Weeknd; Adele	Fetty Wap	Justin Bieber	
2016	Justin Bieber	Rihanna; Beyoncé; Drake	The Chainsmokers	Mike Posner	
2017	Ed Sheeran	Kendrick Lamar; Bruno Mars; Taylor Swift	Cardi B	Kesha	
2018	Drake	Ariana Grande; Cardi B; Post Malone	Dua Lipa	Lil Wayne	
2019	Ariana Grande	Post Malone; Billie Eilish; Lizzo	Lil Nas X	Jonas Brothers	
2020	BTS	The Weeknd; Dua Lipa; Taylor Swift	Roddy Ricch	Black Eyed Peas	

The essay on Alanis Morissette, honorable mentions, rookie, and comeback selections for 1996 are not available on Billboard's website, but are retrievable through the Internet Archive. A shorter blurb on Morissette remains on the main Greatest Pop Star landing page.

Starting in 2021, the Greatest Pop Stars list expanded to a Top 10 format.

Year	Pop star of the year	Second place	Third place	Fourth place	Fifth place	Sixth place	Seventh place	Eighth place	Ninth place	Tenth place	Honorable mentions	Rookie of the year	Comeback of the year
2021	Taylor Swift	Lil Nas X	Adele	Doja Cat	The Weeknd	BTS	Drake	Justin Bieber	Dua Lipa	Bad Bunny	Ariana Grande; Billie Eilish; Bruno Mars; Cardi B; Harry Styles; The Kid Laroi; Lil Baby and Lil Durk; Megan Thee Stallion; Tyler, the Creator; Ye	Olivia Rodrigo	Willow
2022	Bad Bunny	Harry Styles	Taylor Swift	Beyoncé	Drake	Lizzo	Doja Cat	Jack Harlow	Future	Nicki Minaj	21 Savage; Blackpink; Ed Sheeran; Encanto cast; Gunna; Karol G; Kendrick Lamar; Lil Baby; Tems; The Weeknd	Steve Lacy	Sam Smith
2023	Taylor Swift	SZA	Beyoncé	Ice Spice	Morgan Wallen	Karol G	Olivia Rodrigo	Bad Bunny	Doja Cat	Drake	Gunna; Jung Kook; NewJeans; Sabrina Carpenter; Sexxy Red; Shakira; Travis Scott; Troye Sivan; Victoria Monét; Zach Bryan	Peso Pluma	Miley Cyrus
2024	Kendrick Lamar	Sabrina Carpenter	Taylor Swift	Chappell Roan	Charli XCX	Ariana Grande	Beyoncé	Post Malone	Billie Eilish	Jelly Roll	Bruno Mars; Drake; Future; GloRilla; Gracie Abrams; Karol G; Morgan Wallen; Olivia Rodrigo; Tate McRae; Tyler, the Creator	Shaboozey	Hozier
2025	Bad Bunny	Taylor Swift	Lady Gaga	Kendrick Lamar	Sabrina Carpenter	KPop Demon Hunters cast	Tate McRae	Morgan Wallen	Doechii	Tyler, the Creator	Addison Rae; Ariana Grande; Benson Boone; Beyoncé; Blackpink; Bruno Mars; Chappell Roan; Justin Bieber; Rosalía; SZA	Olivia Dean	Clipse

=== 21st century ===
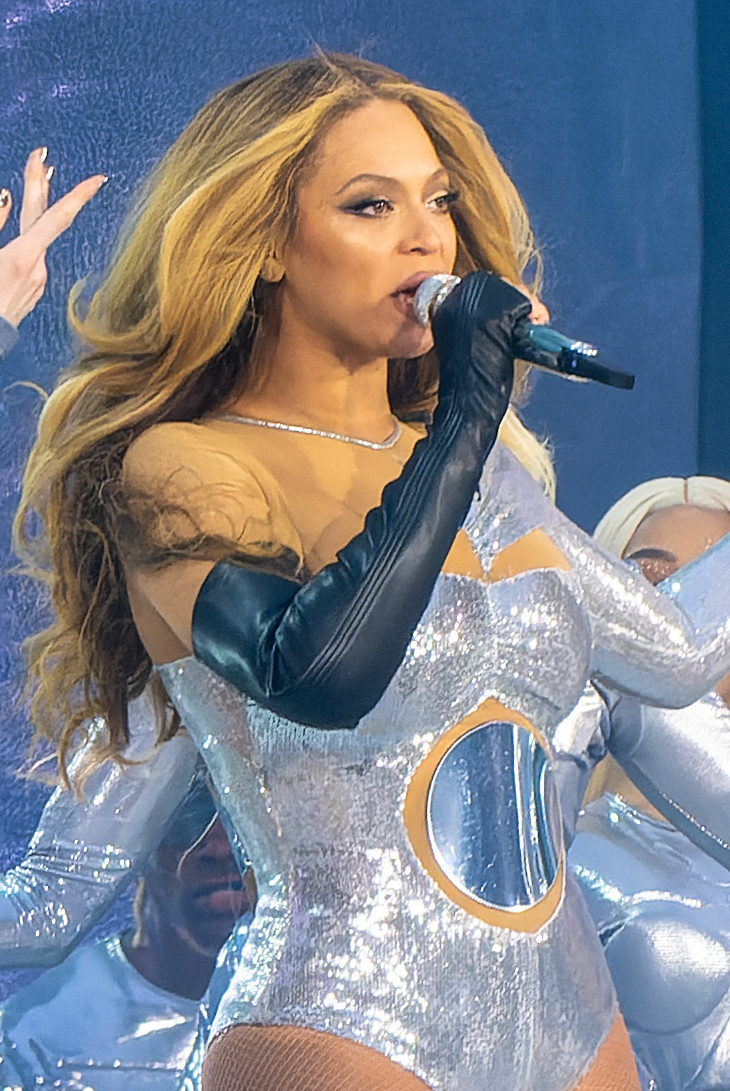
Beyoncé was named the Greatest Pop Star of the 21st Century.

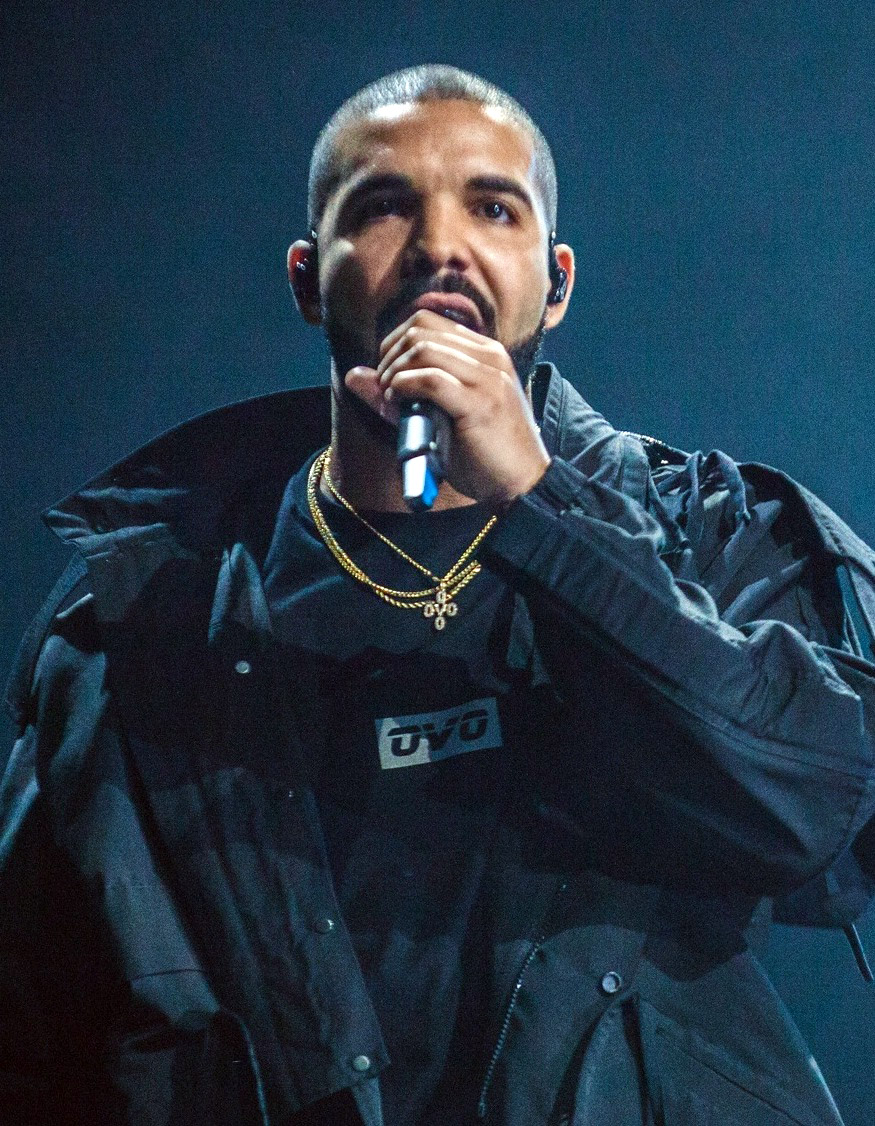
Drake was the highest-ranked male act on the Greatest Pop Star of the 21st Century list.

Billboard launched the project on August 14, 2024, releasing a list of 25 honorable mentions. From August to December, Billboard incrementally rolled out the full ranked list. For each artist, an essay was released recapping their careers and explaining why they have "exemplified pop greatness" over the period, as well as podcast and video discussions of the chosen stars' careers and legacies. The full ranked list of the 25 greatest pop stars of the 21st century are as follows:

1. Beyoncé
2. Taylor Swift
3. Rihanna
4. Drake
5. Lady Gaga
6. Britney Spears
7. Kanye West
8. Justin Bieber
9. Ariana Grande
10. Adele
11. Usher
12. Eminem
13. Nicki Minaj
14. Justin Timberlake
15. Miley Cyrus
16. Jay-Z
17. Shakira
18. The Weeknd
19. BTS
20. Bruno Mars
21. Lil Wayne
22. One Direction
23. Bad Bunny
24. Ed Sheeran
25. Katy Perry

==== Honorable mentions ====
The 26th through 50th greatest pop stars on the 21st century were listed alphabetically as honorable mentions.

- 50 Cent
- Alicia Keys
- Billie Eilish
- Cardi B
- Carrie Underwood
- Chris Brown
- Christina Aguilera
- Doja Cat
- Dua Lipa
- Future
- Jennifer Lopez
- Kelly Clarkson
- Kendrick Lamar
- Kesha
- Lana Del Rey
- Lorde
- Maroon 5
- Megan Thee Stallion
- Missy Elliott
- Nelly
- Olivia Rodrigo
- Pink
- Post Malone
- Sean Paul
- SZA

== Statistics ==
Female musicians dominated Billboard's Greatest Pop Star lists, showing the omnipresence of women within popular music in post-Madonna era. Madonna became the first act to be named the Greatest Pop Star twice (1985 and 1989). Women were also ranked highly on the 21st century list as only three men made into the top ten, with Beyoncé, Taylor Swift, Rihanna appearing in the top three.

Appearances by types of artists
List	Male	Female	Group	Total
Greatest Pop Stars By Year	16	21	8	45
Greatest Pop Stars of the 21st Century	12	11	2	25

== Controversy ==
After Taylor Swift was placed at number 2 on the 21st century list, some Swifties were accused of sending racial abuse to Beyoncé, the assumed number-one pick. The hashtag #SwiftieRacism later trended on Twitter, with some Swifties facing backlash for racist behavior in the past. Various Swifties also criticized Billboard for including a clip from Kanye West's 2016 music video for "Famous", which included a nude wax figure resembling Swift, in a tribute video to Swift, although the video in question was covered in detail in the article about Kanye West. In response, Billboard removed the clip and apologized on social media.
