= Justin Bieber =

Canadian singer (born 1994)

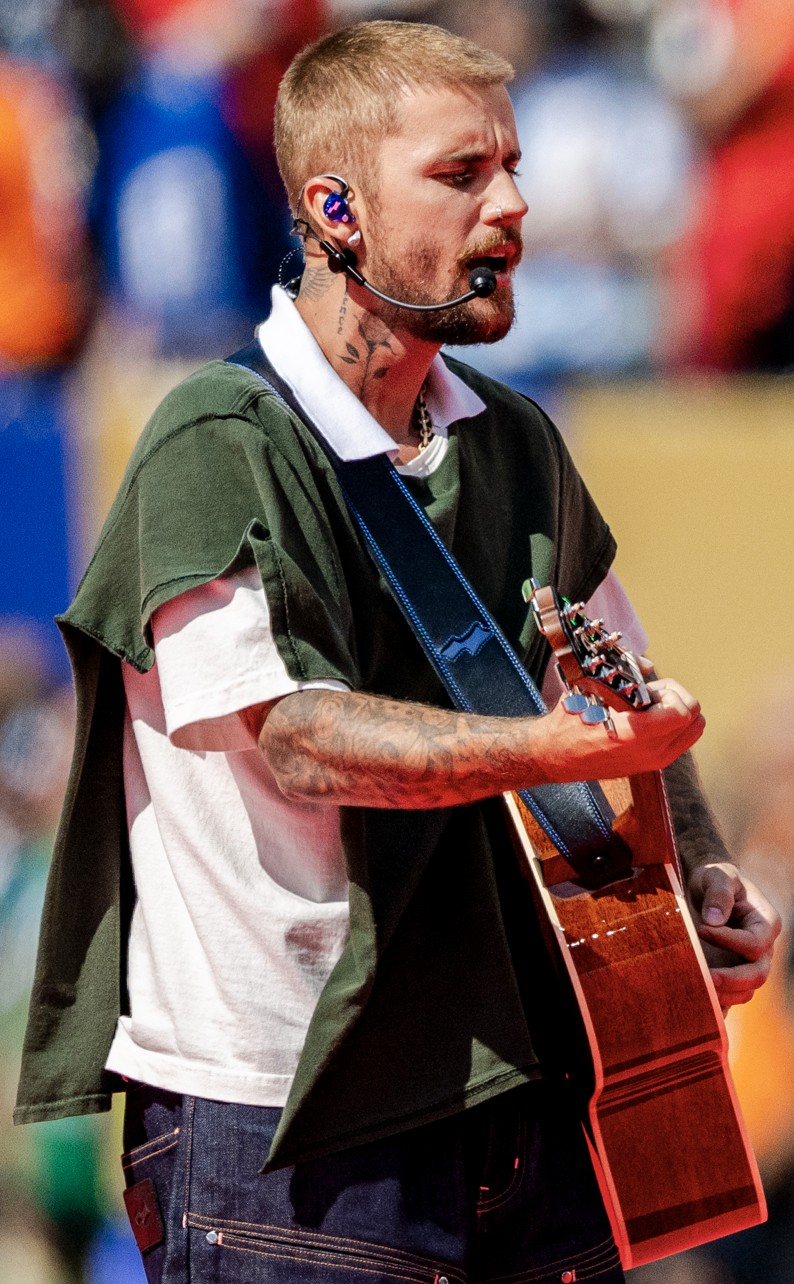
- Bieber in 2026
- Born: Justin Drew Bieber; March 1, 1994 (age 32); London, Ontario, Canada
- Occupation: Singer
- Years active: 2007–present
- Works: Discography; videography; performances
- Spouse: Hailey Baldwin (m. 2018)
- Children: 1
- Parents: Jeremy Bieber (father); Pattie Mallette (mother)
- Family: Baldwin family (by marriage)
- Awards: Full list
- Musical career
- Origin: Stratford, Ontario, Canada
- Genres: Pop; R&B; EDM
- Instruments: Vocals; drums; keyboards; guitar
- Labels: RBMG; Schoolboy; Island Def Jam; Island; Def Jam; ILH
- Website: justinbiebermusic.com

Justin Drew Bieber (/ˈbiːbər/ BEE-bər; born March 1, 1994) is a Canadian singer. An influential figure in popular music, Bieber is known for his image reinventions and multi-genre performances. With estimated sales of over 150 million records, he is one of the best-selling music artists of all time.

Bieber rose to fame in the late 2000s after being discovered by American talent manager Scooter Braun, who signed him to Raymond Braun Media Group (RBMG). Bieber subsequently released his debut extended play (EP), My World (2009), which earned him international recognition and established him as a teen idol. His debut studio album, My World 2.0 (2010), topped the US Billboard 200, making him the youngest solo male to do so in 47 years. Its lead single, "Baby", became one of the best-selling singles in the United States. His second album, Under the Mistletoe (2011), became the first Christmas album by a male artist to debut on top of the chart. With his third studio album, Believe (2012), and its acoustic re-release (2013), Bieber became the first artist to have five US number-one albums by the age of eighteen.

Bieber's EDM-infused single "Where Are Ü Now" set the tone for his fourth studio album, Purpose (2015). It yielded three US Billboard Hot 100 number-one singles: "What Do You Mean?", "Sorry" and "Love Yourself". The songs also occupied the top three of the UK singles chart, which Bieber was the first artist in history to achieve. In 2017, he featured on the US number-one singles "I'm the One" and "Despacito"; the latter tied the then-record for the most weeks at number one in history. His following two studio albums, Changes (2020) and Justice (2021), debuted at number one, making Bieber the youngest solo act to have eight US number-one albums. He released two US number-one singles in 2021, "Peaches" and "Stay". After a brief hiatus, he released his seventh and eighth studio albums, Swag and Swag II, in 2025.

Bieber's accolades include 2 Grammy Awards, 1 Latin Grammy Award, 8 Juno Awards, 2 Brit Awards, 26 Billboard Music Awards, 19 American Music Awards, 6 MTV Video Music Awards and a record 22 MTV Europe Music Awards. Time named him one of the 100 most influential people in 2011, and Forbes listed him among the top 10 most powerful celebrities from 2011 to 2013. In 2024, Billboard ranked him the eighth greatest pop star of the 21st century. Outside of music, Bieber has co-founded the clean water technology company Generosity, and launched the clothing lines Drew House and Skylrk. He was the recipient of the Queen Elizabeth II Diamond Jubilee Medal in 2012.

== Life and career ==
=== Early life ===
Justin Drew Bieber was born on March 1, 1994, in London, Ontario, and was raised in Stratford. His parents, Jeremy Bieber and Pattie Mallette, separated soon after his birth. Mallette raised Bieber as a single mother in low-income housing. Mallette's mother Diane and stepfather Bruce helped her raise Bieber, who has maintained contact with his father. Bieber has French, Irish, English, and German ancestry. Through his father, Bieber has two younger half-sisters and a younger half-brother. He also has a stepsister, who is the daughter of his stepmother. Growing up, Bieber learned to play the drums and piano; his mother bought his first drum set when he was four and his first guitar when he was six. He performed in church benefits at age eight.

Bieber attended two French-language immersion elementary schools in Stratford: Jeanne Sauvé Catholic School and Bedford Public School. In grades 7 and 8, he attended Stratford Northwestern Secondary School. He then attended St. Michael Catholic Secondary School, graduating in 2012 with a 4.0 GPA.

=== 2007–2009: Career beginnings and My World ===
In early 2007, at age 12, Bieber performed a cover of Ne-Yo's "So Sick" for a local singing competition in Stratford, placing in the top three. Mallette posted a video of the performance on YouTube for their family and friends to see. She continued to upload videos of Bieber singing covers of various R&B songs, and Bieber's popularity on the site grew. In the same year, Bieber busked in front of the Avon Theatre.

While searching for videos of a different singer, Scooter Braun, a former marketing executive of So So Def Recordings, accidentally clicked on a 2007 YouTube video of Bieber performing a cover of "So Sick". Impressed, Braun tracked down Bieber's school, the theatre Bieber was performing at, and finally Mallette, who was initially reluctant because of Braun's Judaism; she wanted her son to sign with "a Christian man, a Christian label". However, church elders convinced her to let Bieber go with Braun. At age 13, Bieber went to Atlanta, Georgia, with Braun to record demo tapes. Bieber began singing for Usher one week later. Bieber soon signed with Raymond Braun Media Group (RBMG), a joint venture between Braun and Usher. Singer Justin Timberlake also competed to sign Bieber but lost the bidding war to Usher.

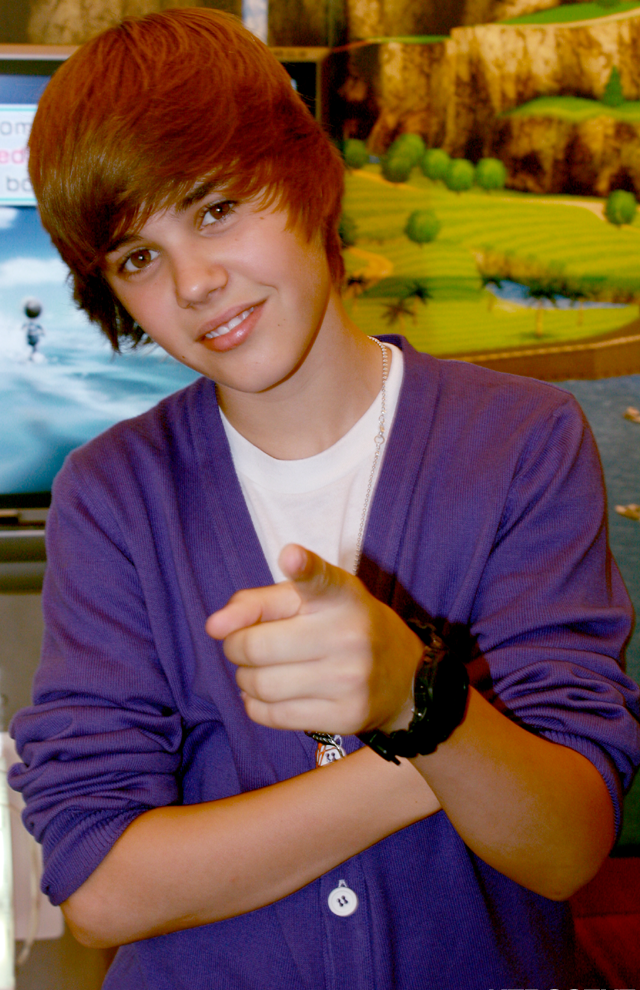
Bieber at a signing event in 2009

Usher then sought assistance in finding a label home for the artist from then-manager Chris Hicks, who helped engineer an audition with his contact L.A. Reid of the Island Def Jam Music Group. Reid signed Bieber to Island Records in October 2008 (resulting in a joint venture between RBMG and Island Records) and appointed Hicks as executive vice-president of Def Jam, where he could manage Bieber's career at the label. Bieber then moved to Atlanta with his mother to pursue further work with Braun and Usher. Braun became Bieber's manager in 2008. Bieber's first single, "One Time", was released to radio while he was still recording his debut album. The song reached number 12 on the Canadian Hot 100 during its first week of release in July 2009, and peaked at number 17 on the US Billboard Hot 100 chart. The song was certified platinum in Canada and the US and gold in Australia and New Zealand.

Bieber's first release, an extended play (EP) titled My World, was released on November 17, 2009. The EP's second single, "One Less Lonely Girl", charted within the top 20 of the Billboard Hot 100. It also peaked within the top 20 in Canada. My World was eventually certified platinum in the US and double platinum in both Canada and the United Kingdom. To promote the EP, Bieber performed on several live shows such as MTVU's VMA Tour, YTV's The Next Star, and Today's Toyota Concert Series. He also appeared on It's On with Alexa Chung, The Ellen DeGeneres Show, and The Wendy Williams Show. Bieber guest-starred in an episode of True Jackson, VP in late 2009. He performed Ron Miller and Bryan Wells's "Someday at Christmas" for US president Barack Obama and First Lady Michelle Obama at the White House for Christmas in Washington, which aired on December 20, 2009.

=== 2010–2011: My World 2.0, Never Say Never, and Under the Mistletoe ===
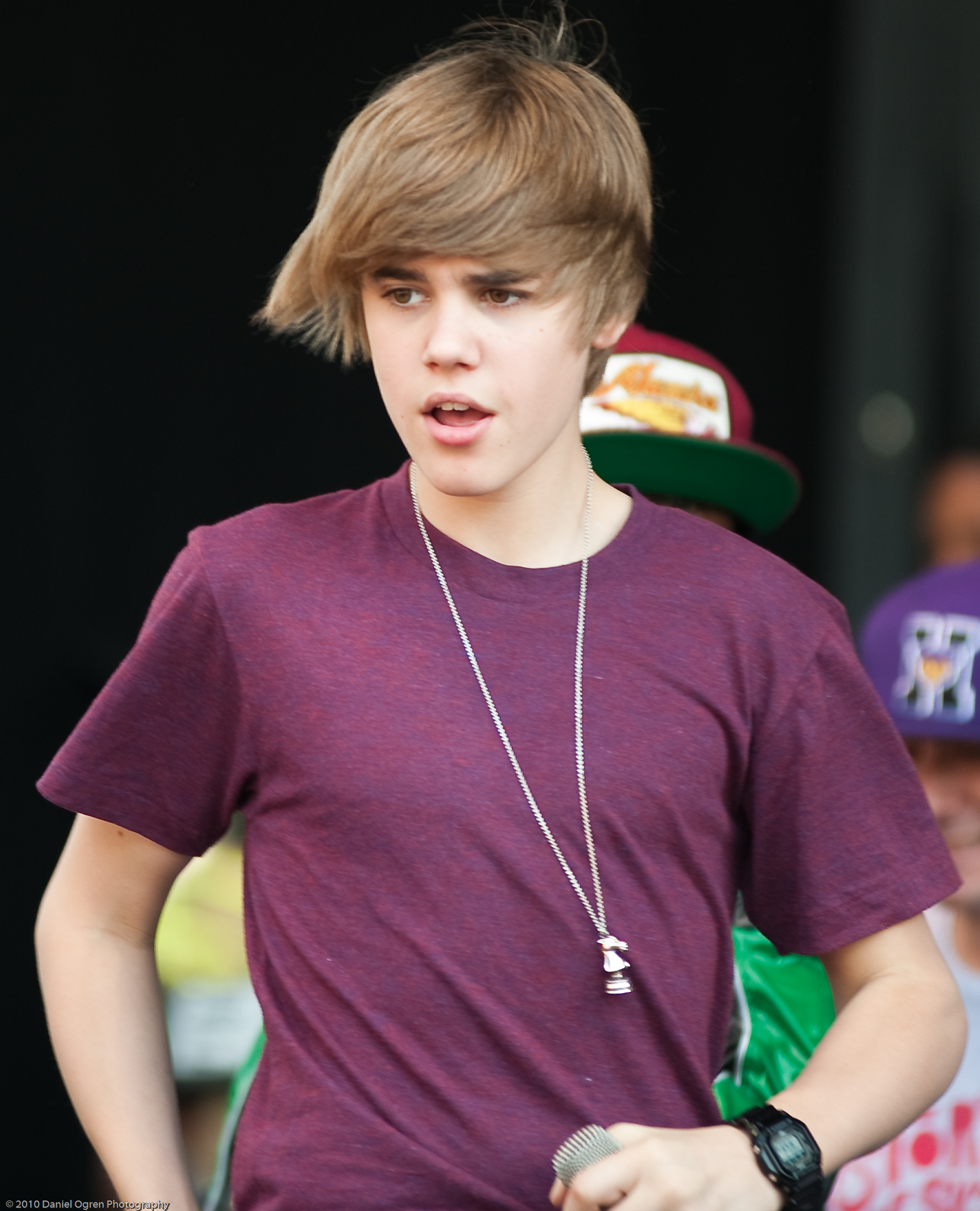
Bieber performing at the 2010 White House Easter Egg Roll

Bieber was a presenter at the 52nd Annual Grammy Awards on January 31, 2010. He was a vocalist for the remake of the charity single "We Are the World" for its 25th anniversary to benefit Haiti after the 2010 earthquake. Bieber sings the opening line, which was performed by Lionel Richie in the original version. In January 2010, "Baby" featuring Ludacris was released as the lead single to his debut album, My World 2.0. The song charted at number five on the Billboard Hot 100, number three on the Canadian Hot 100, and the top 10 in several international markets. My World 2.0 received generally favourable reviews and debuted at number one on the US Billboard 200, making Bieber the youngest solo male act to top the chart since Stevie Wonder in 1963. My World 2.0 also debuted at number one in Australia, Canada, Ireland, and New Zealand.

My World 2.0's subsequent singles included "Eenie Meenie" and a remix of "Somebody to Love" featuring Usher. On June 23, Bieber went on his first official headlining tour, the My World Tour, to promote My World and My World 2.0. In May 2010, Bieber featured in rapper Soulja Boy's song "Rich Girl". In July, his video for "Baby" surpassed Lady Gaga's "Bad Romance" (2009) as the most viewed, and most disliked, YouTube video at the time.

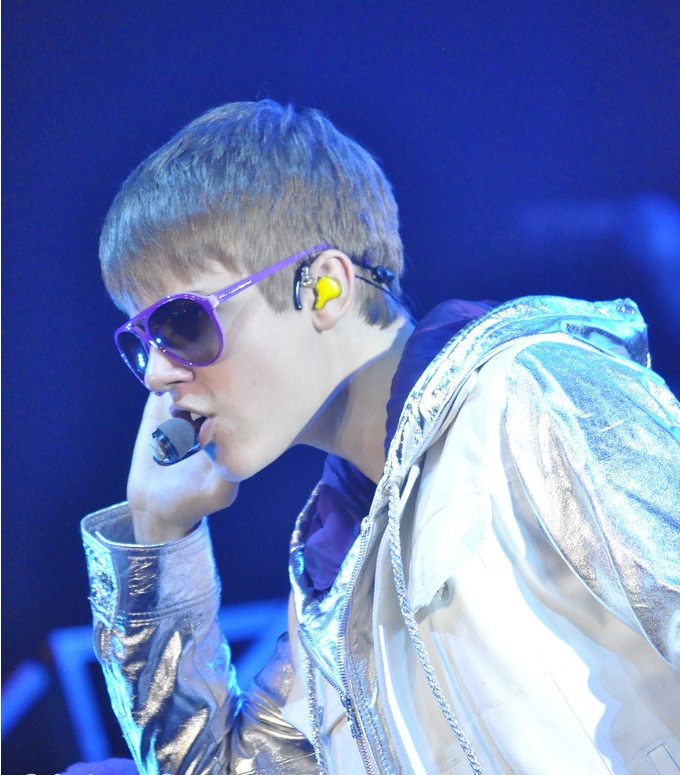
Bieber performing in Indonesia at the My World Tour in 2011

Bieber guest-starred in the season premiere of the CBS American crime drama CSI: Crime Scene Investigation, which aired on September 23, 2010. He played a troubled teenager with an "explosive" brother. Bieber appeared in a subsequent episode of the series, which aired on February 17, 2011, in which his character was killed. Bieber performed a medley of his singles "U Smile", "Baby", and "Somebody to Love", and briefly played the drums, at the 2010 MTV Video Music Awards on September 12, 2010. Bieber released My Worlds Acoustic on November 26, 2010, in the United States. The album featured acoustic versions of songs from his previous albums, and accompanied the release of a new song titled "Pray". In October 2010, Bieber released his first book, Justin Bieber: First Step 2 Forever: My Story, an autobiography with text from Bieber and photographs from Robert Caplin.

A 3-D part-biopic, part-concert film starring Bieber entitled Justin Bieber: Never Say Never, was released on February 11, 2011, directed by Jon M. Chu. The film was a box office success, while critics gave it mixed reviews. Never Say Never reportedly exceeded industry expectations and became one of the highest debuts for a music-documentary. Never Say Never grossed $99 million worldwide, becoming the highest-grossing concert or performance film at the global box office. The film was accompanied by his second remix album, Never Say Never: The Remixes, released on February 14, 2011, and features remixes of songs from his debut album, with guest appearances from Miley Cyrus, Chris Brown, and Kanye West, among others. In 2011, Time named Bieber one of the 100 most influential people on their annual list. Also in June, Bieber was ranked number two on Forbes' list of Best-Paid Celebrities under 30.

On November 1, 2011, Bieber released the Christmas album Under the Mistletoe, his second studio album. It became the first Christmas album by a male artist to debut atop the Billboard 200, and sold 210,000 copies in its first week. Billboard named it one of the most successful holiday albums in the US in 2021. The first single from the album, "Mistletoe", peaked at number one on the US Billboard Holiday 100 and Holiday Digital Songs charts. Billboard has listed the album and its singles among the greatest holiday albums and songs of all time, respectively.

=== 2012–2014: Believe, Journals, and other appearances ===
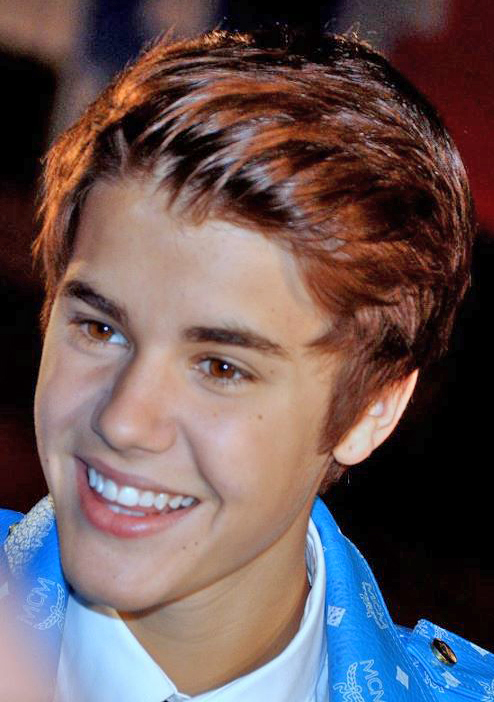
Bieber at the 2012 NRJ Music Awards in Cannes, France

In late 2011, Bieber began recording his third studio album, titled Believe. The following week, Bieber appeared on The Ellen DeGeneres Show to announce that the first single would be titled "Boyfriend", which was released on March 26, 2012. The song debuted at number two on the Billboard Hot 100, selling 521,000 digital units, the second-highest-ever debut digital sales week. "Boyfriend" debuted atop the Canadian Hot 100, becoming his first number-one single on the chart. The second single from Believe, "As Long as You Love Me" featuring rapper Big Sean, was released in June 2012. It reached number six on the Billboard Hot 100.

Island Records released Believe on June 19, 2012. The album marked a musical departure from the teen pop sound of his previous releases, and incorporated elements of dance-pop and R&B genres. Believe debuted at number one on the Billboard 200, becoming his fourth number-one album. The album sold 57,000 copies in its first week in Canada, debuting atop the Canadian Albums Chart. In October 2012, the third single from Believe, "Beauty and a Beat" featuring Nicki Minaj, was released. The music video held the record for the most views in 24 hours when it was released, with 10.6 million views.

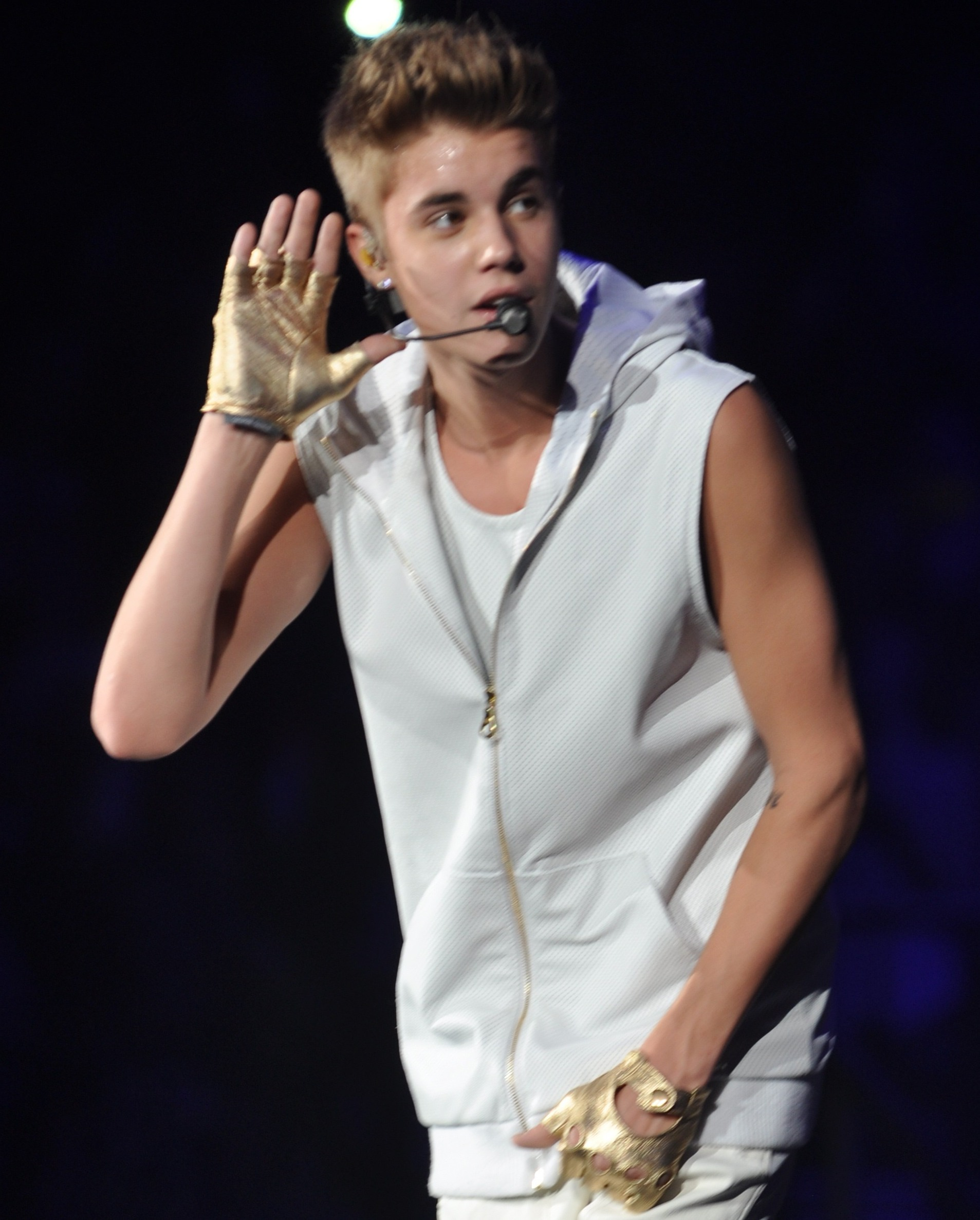
Bieber performing at the Believe Tour in 2012

The Believe Tour, which promoted Believe, began in September 2012. On January 29, 2013, Bieber released an acoustic album titled Believe Acoustic. The album debuted at number one on the Billboard 200, making Bieber the first artist with five number-one albums in the US before turning nineteen. Bieber returned to Saturday Night Live as the host and musical guest on the February 9, 2013, episode. His appearance was panned by critics and cast members, including Bill Hader, who said he did not enjoy the presence of Bieber or his entourage.

On March 7, 2013, Bieber briefly fainted backstage at London's O2 Arena due to breathing difficulties, returning to finish the show after receiving oxygen before being hospitalized for precautionary check-ups. Bieber cancelled his second Lisbon, Portugal, concert at the Pavilhão Atlântico, which was to be held on March 12, because of low ticket sales. The concert held at the same venue on March 11 proceeded as scheduled. In April 2013, Bieber was criticized for writing a message in the guestbook at the Anne Frank House that read, "Truly inspiring to be able to come here. Anne was a great girl. Hopefully she would have been a belieber". The Anne Frank House defended Bieber, stating, "He's 19. It's a crazy life he's living, he didn't mean bad".

In mid-August, a remixed duet version of Michael Jackson's previously unreleased song "Slave to the Rhythm", featuring Bieber, was leaked online. In September, Bieber was featured in Maejor Ali's song "Lolly" with rapper Juicy J. A music video for "Melodies", the debut single of American singer Madison Beer, was released in the same month featuring Bieber in a cameo appearance. On October 3, 2013, Bieber announced that he would release a new song every Monday for 10 weeks as a lead-up to the film Justin Bieber's Believe, which entered production in May 2012 and was released on December 25, 2013. The film is a follow-up to Bieber's first theatrical film Justin Bieber: Never Say Never, with Jon M. Chu returning as director. Between October 7 and December 10, Bieber released "Heartbreaker", "All That Matters", "Hold Tight", "Recovery", "Bad Day", "All Bad", "PYD" (featuring R. Kelly), "Roller Coaster", "Change Me", and "Confident" (featuring Chance the Rapper). On December 9, it was announced that all ten tracks would be featured on the compilation album Journals, which would also feature five additional unreleased songs, a music video for "All That Matters", and a trailer for Believe. Journals was only available for purchase via iTunes from December 23, 2013, to January 9, 2014.

The disbanding of The Def Jam Island Recordings in April 2014 caused Bieber and a number of artists to be transferred to another Universal Music division, Def Jam Recordings. In June 2014, a video emerged of Bieber, then aged 15, telling a joke about Black people, which used the racial slur nigger multiple times. In the same month, a second video showed Bieber at age 15 giggling as he sings his song "One Less Lonely Girl", but parodying the main lyric as "One less lonely nigger", and stating that if he were to kill one, he would be "part of the KKK". He apologized the day the second video was publicized: "Facing my mistakes from years ago has been one of the hardest things I've ever dealt with." Bieber released a song titled "Home to Mama" featuring Cody Simpson in November 2014. In the same month, Bieber topped Forbes' 30 Under 30 annual ranking, which lists the highest-earning celebrities under 30 for that year.

=== 2015–2017: Purpose ===
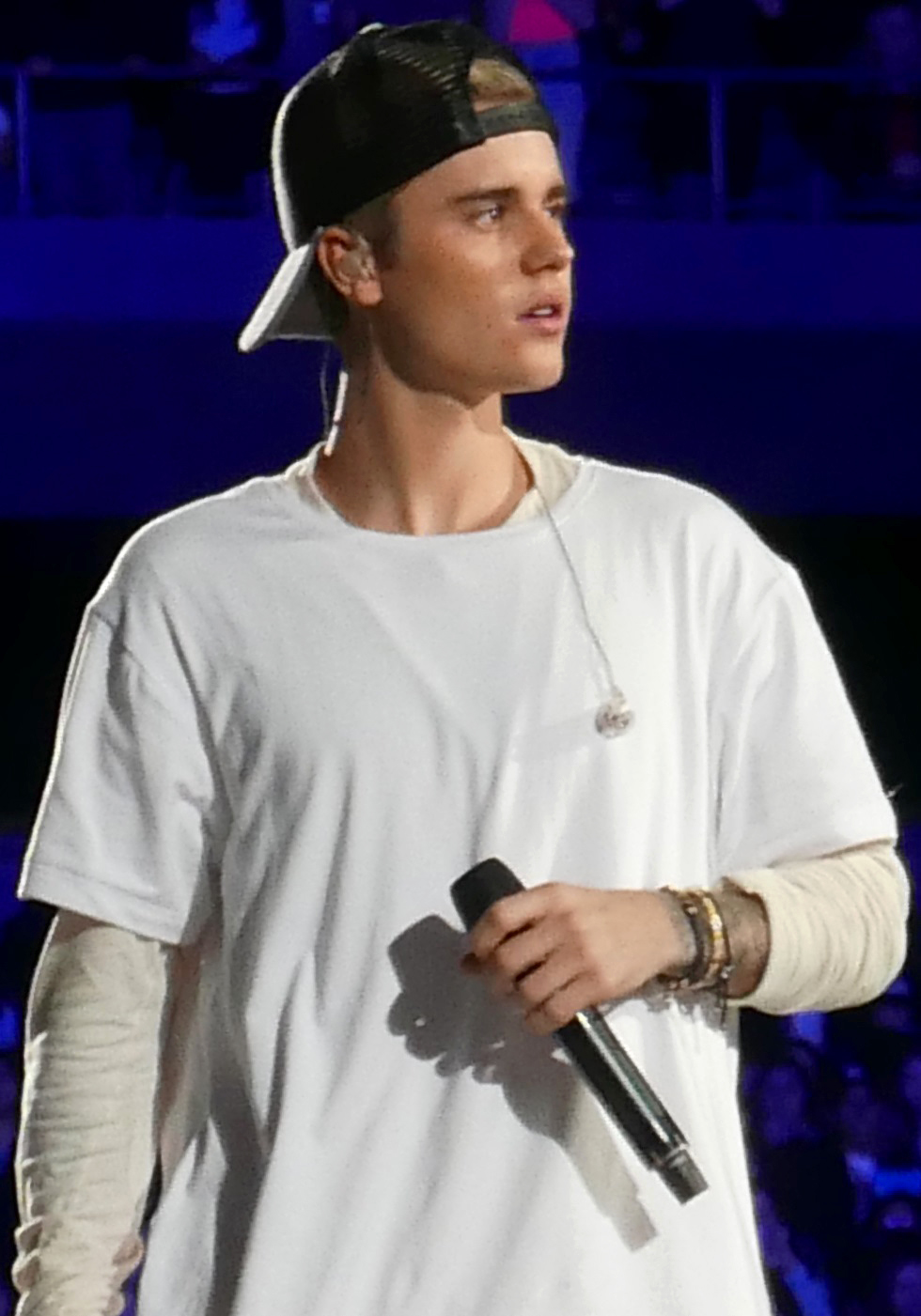
Bieber in Rosemont, Illinois, in 2015

In February 2015, Bieber released "Where Are Ü Now", a collaboration with electronic dance music (EDM) duo Jack Ü. The song peaked at number eight on the Billboard Hot 100 and reached number one on Billboard's Hot Dance/Electronic Songs chart. It earned Bieber the Grammy Award for Best Dance/Electronic Recording at the 58th Annual Grammy Awards. In March 2015, Bieber made an appearance in the music video for Carly Rae Jepsen's single "I Really Like You", and was the featured roastee in Comedy Central's annual roast special. He was a contestant on the reality competition series Lip Sync Battle in July. Bieber filmed an episode for the Fox TV reality series Knock Knock Live, and aired before the show was cancelled after two episodes.

In August 2015, Bieber released a new single titled "What Do You Mean?" as the lead single from his fourth studio album, Purpose. The song is a blend of teen pop, EDM and acoustic R&B. It debuted at number one on the Hot 100 and became Bieber's first number-one single in the country. He set a Guinness World Record by becoming the youngest solo male artist to debut at the top of the Hot 100. It also broke the record for the fastest song to reach number one on the US iTunes chart, doing so in under five minutes.

Two following singles from Purpose—"Sorry" and "Love Yourself"—topped the Hot 100, making Bieber the first male artist in almost a decade to have three number-ones from a single album. He also became the first solo artist to chart three solo songs in the top five of the Hot 100 simultaneously, and the first as a lead act since the Beatles in 1964. "Love Yourself" and "Sorry" occupied the top two of the Billboard Year-End Hot 100 in 2016, making Bieber the third artist in history to do so. Purpose was released on November 13, 2015, and debuted at number one on the Billboard 200, becoming Bieber's sixth album to debut at the top of the chart. In support of the album, Bieber embarked on the Purpose World Tour.

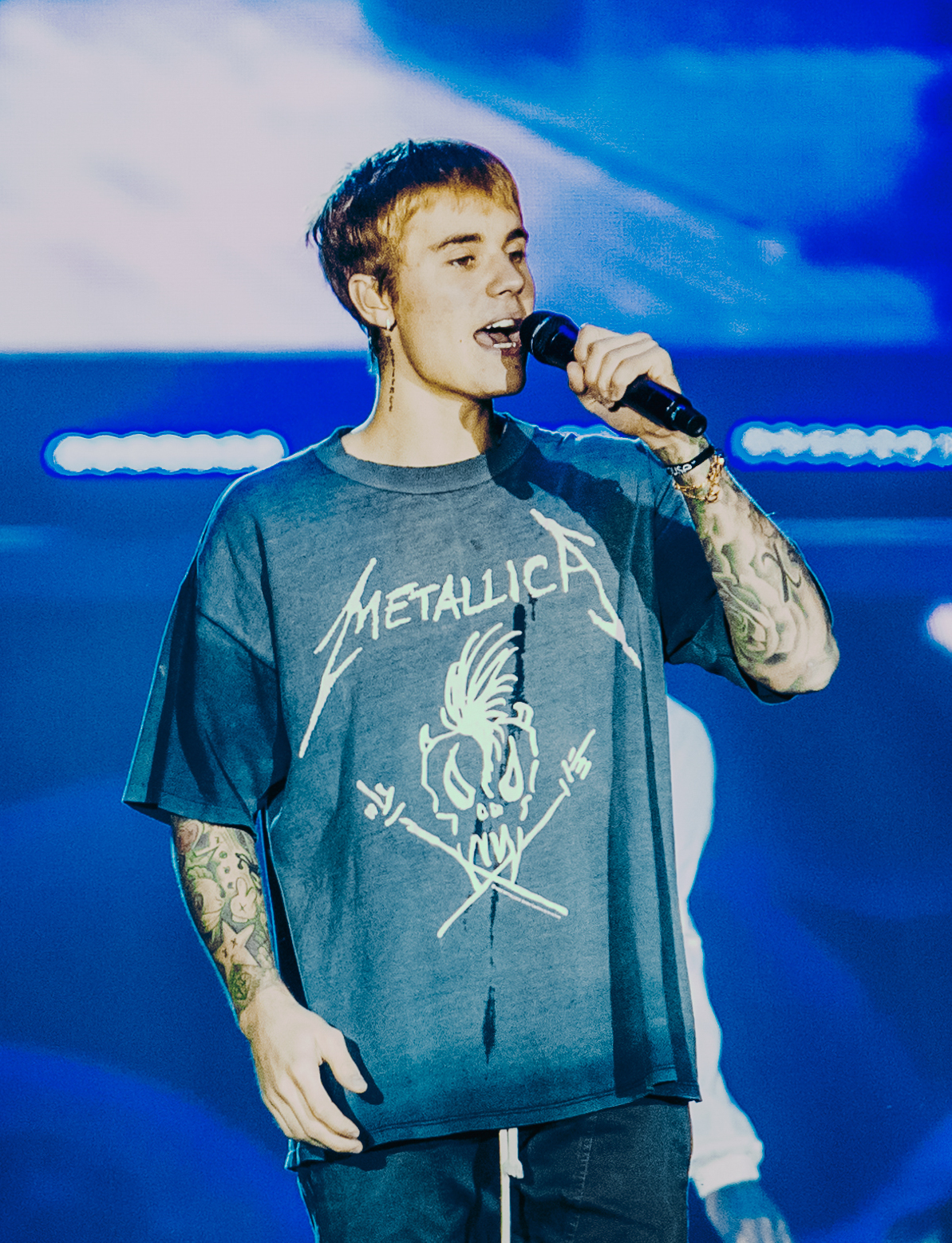
Bieber performing in Kraków, Poland, at the Purpose World Tour in 2016

On January 8, 2016, Bieber became the first artist to occupy the top three of the UK singles chart. He achieved this as "Love Yourself", "Sorry" and "What Do You Mean?" charted at positions one, two and three simultaneously. In July 2016, Bieber released a new single titled "Cold Water", with EDM trio Major Lazer and Danish singer MØ. It debuted at number two on the Hot 100, becoming Bieber's third number-two debut on the ranking, passing Mariah Carey's record to become the artist with the most number-two debuts in the US at the time.

In August 2016, Bieber was featured on DJ Snake's single "Let Me Love You". The song reached number four on the Hot 100. Bieber then appeared in the documentary Bodyguards: Secret Lives from the Watchtower (2016). At the 59th Annual Grammy Awards, Purpose was nominated for Album of the Year and Best Pop Vocal Album, and "Love Yourself" received nominations for Song of the Year and Best Pop Solo Performance respectively.

=== 2017–2019: Collaborations and marriage ===
In April 2017, Puerto Rican singers Luis Fonsi and Daddy Yankee released a remix for their song "Despacito" featuring Bieber. It was the first song by Bieber in which he sang in Spanish. The song reached number one in the US and joined "Macarena" (1996) as the only songs with English and Spanish lyrics to reach number one on the Billboard Hot 100. Spending 16 weeks atop the chart, it tied the then-record for the most weeks at number one in Hot 100 history. The song spent a then-record 56 weeks at number one on Billboard's Hot Latin Songs chart and broke the then-record for most weeks at number one on the Digital Songs Sales chart. The song earned Bieber his first career Latin Grammy. As of September 2021, "Despacito" holds the number-one position on the Greatest of All Time Hot Latin Songs chart and number-five on the Greatest of All Time Songs of the Summer chart by Billboard. At the 60th Annual Grammy Awards, "Despacito" received nominations for Record of the Year, Song of the Year, and Best Pop Duo/Group Performance.

Bieber, along with rappers Quavo, Chance the Rapper, and Lil Wayne, provided vocals on DJ Khaled's single "I'm the One", released in April 2017. The song debuted at number one on the Hot 100, becoming Bieber's second number-one debut and his fourth song to top the chart. One week later, "Despacito" topped the charts in the US, which became his fifth number-one single and made Bieber the first artist in history to earn new number-ones in back-to-back weeks. "I'm the One" also reached number one on Billboard's Hot Rap Songs and Hot R&B/Hip-Hop Songs charts. In June, French DJ David Guetta released the song "2U" featuring Bieber. The following month, Bieber cancelled the remaining dates of the Purpose World Tour due to "unforeseen circumstances" and exhaustion from touring. The tour grossed over $257 million, making it one of the highest-grossing concert tours of both 2016 and 2017.

Bieber reunited with DJ Khaled on "No Brainer" in July 2018, co-featuring again with Chance the Rapper and Quavo. The single peaked in the top five of the Hot 100 and reached number one on Billboard's Hot R&B Songs chart. He was also featured in the accompanying music video. Bieber became engaged to model and longtime friend Hailey Baldwin on July 7, 2018. They had briefly dated from December 2015 to January 2016, before resuming their relationship in June 2018. Bieber and Baldwin reportedly obtained a marriage licence in September 2018, leading to reports that they had a civil marriage. In November, Bieber said that he was married to Baldwin. Bieber and Baldwin held their wedding ceremony in Bluffton, South Carolina, on September 30, 2019.

Bieber delivered a surprise performance at Coachella 2019, marking his first live performance in two years, and hinted at a new album. British singer Ed Sheeran and Bieber released the single "I Don't Care" in May 2019, from Sheeran's album No.6 Collaborations Project. "I Don't Care" topped the charts in 26 countries and reached number two in the United States. Bieber and country music duo Dan + Shay released the song "10,000 Hours" in October 2019, which peaked at number four on the Hot 100. It became the highest-charting non-holiday country song in the history of the Billboard Streaming Songs chart and spent 21 weeks at number one on Billboard's Hot Country Songs chart. As a result, Bieber became the first act in history to reach number one on seven multi-metric charts: Hot 100, Hot Country Songs, Hot Dance/Electronic Songs, Hot Latin Songs, Hot R&B Songs, Hot R&B/Hip-Hop Songs, and Hot Rap Songs. It earned Bieber his second Grammy Award for Best Country Duo/Group Performance at the 63rd Annual Grammy Awards. In the same month, Bieber became the youngest solo male artist to spend 200 cumulative weeks in the top 10 of the Hot 100.

=== 2020–2022: Changes and Justice ===
In January 2020, Bieber released the 10-part YouTube Originals documentary series Justin Bieber: Seasons, which focused on his marriage and preparation for new music. The docu-series amassed 32.6 million views within its first week, breaking the record for the most-viewed premiere in its first week of all YouTube Originals. Bieber released his fifth studio album, Changes, on February 14, 2020. It debuted at number one on the Billboard 200, making Bieber the youngest solo artist to have seven US number-one albums, while it received mixed reviews from critics. The first single from Changes, titled "Yummy", was released on January 3, 2020, and debuted at number two on the Billboard Hot 100. The second single, "Intentions", followed on February 7, which peaked at number five on the Hot 100. American singer Ariana Grande and Bieber released the single "Stuck with U" on May 8, 2020, to help raise funds for the first responders of the COVID-19 pandemic. The song became Bieber's sixth number-one single on the Hot 100.

Bieber released the song "Holy" featuring Chance the Rapper in September 2020, as the first single from his upcoming sixth studio album. The following month, he released the second single, "Lonely", in collaboration with Benny Blanco, which peaked at number 12 on the Hot 100. Bieber and J Balvin were featured on a remix of 24kGoldn's single "Mood" in November. Two weeks later, Shawn Mendes and Bieber released the single "Monster". Bieber released the third single from Changes, "Anyone", on January 1, 2021, which peaked at number six on the Hot 100. On February 14, 2021, Bieber performed "Journals Live" in collaboration with TikTok, which marked the first live performance of his 2013 album Journals; it was the first long-form concert event on the platform and broke the record for the most-viewed single-artist livestream in the platform's history.

Bieber released his sixth studio album, Justice, and its fifth single, "Peaches", on March 19, 2021. The album was met with generally positive reviews and received 8 nominations at the 64th Annual Grammy Awards. It debuted at number one on the Billboard 200, becoming Bieber's eighth number-one project, while "Peaches" debuted on top of the Hot 100, becoming his seventh number-one single, respectively. As a result, Bieber became the youngest solo artist to attain eight US number-one albums, breaking a 56-year-old record held by Elvis Presley, and the first solo male artist to simultaneously debut a song and an album at number one in the US. He also became the first male act to have his first six studio albums debut at number one on the Billboard 200. To promote the album, Bieber later embarked on the Justice World Tour on February 18, 2022. The sixth single from Justice, "Ghost", peaked at number 5 on the Hot 100 in March 2022, marking his 20th career top-five hit on the chart. The single reached number 1 on Billboard's Pop Songs chart, making Bieber the first solo male artist to attain 10 number-one singles in the chart's history.

Bieber performing at the 2021 Saudi Arabian Grand Prix

Bieber surprise-released Freedom, a gospel-inspired EP consisting of six songs, on Easter 2021. Later in 2021, Bieber appeared on DJ Khaled's single "Let It Go" and collaborated with the Kid Laroi on "Stay". "Stay" reached number one on the Hot 100 in its fourth week, becoming his eighth number-one single in the US. It also became his 100th career entry on the chart, making him the then-youngest solo artist to chart 100 songs on the Hot 100. Bieber headlined the "Freedom Experience" show at the SoFi Stadium on July 24, 2021. In August 2021, he released a remix of Nigerian singer Wizkid's song "Essence", which peaked at number nine on the Hot 100, and released a collaboration with Skrillex and Don Toliver titled "Don't Go". In September, Bieber headlined the 2021 Made in America Festival at the Benjamin Franklin Parkway. Bieber released the documentary film Justin Bieber: Our World in October, showcasing his preparation for his 2020 "New Year's Eve Live". He released a cover of Brenda Lee's song "Rockin' Around the Christmas Tree" later that month. Bieber was the headlining performer at the 2021 Saudi Arabian Grand Prix on December 5, 2021.

Bieber appeared on Kehlani's single "Up at Night" in March 2022. He delivered a surprise performance with Daniel Caesar at Coachella 2022. The following month, Bieber released "Honest" featuring Don Toliver and an accompanying music video directed by Cole Bennett. In June, Bieber announced that he had been diagnosed with Ramsay Hunt syndrome type 2 and that half of his face was paralyzed. He cancelled and postponed concerts and appearances due to the condition, but returned to live performances in late July. In September, Bieber announced that all remaining performances of the Justice World Tour would be suspended to prioritize his health.

=== 2023–present: Hiatus, fatherhood, Swag and Swag II ===
In January 2023, Bieber sold his music publishing rights and recording catalogue shares up to the end of 2021 to the Hipgnosis Songs Fund—a sale valued at over $200 million. In March, he appeared as a featured artist alongside Future on Don Toliver's single "Private Landing". He joined Toliver on stage at the 2023 Rolling Loud festival to deliver a surprise performance of the song. In September, Bieber released an acoustic version of the single "Snooze" by SZA and starred in its music video as her love interest. Baldwin gave birth to their child in 2024.

Bieber released his seventh studio album, Swag, on July 11, 2025. It debuted at number two on the Billboard 200 with 163,000 equivalent units earned in the US in its opening week. The album's lead single, "Daisies", debuted at number two on the Billboard Hot 100. On September 4, Bieber announced that his ninth studio album, Swag II, would be released the next day. He was a headlining performer at the music festival Coachella 2026. Following his performance during the first weekend at Coachella, his music catalogue experienced a 172% increase in streams with 17 songs charting on the Billboard Global 200 chart for the week of April 25. During the same week, Bieber simultaneously charted seven albums on the Billboard 200 for the first time in his career, including Journals, which made its debut on the chart over 12 years after its release. On the week starting May 9, "Beauty and a Beat" topped the Billboard Global 200, becoming his third number-one single on the chart. On July 19, 2026, Bieber performed an acoustic rendition of his song "Everything Hallelujah" during the 2026 FIFA World Cup final halftime show, which took place at New York New Jersey Stadium.

== Artistry ==
=== Influences ===
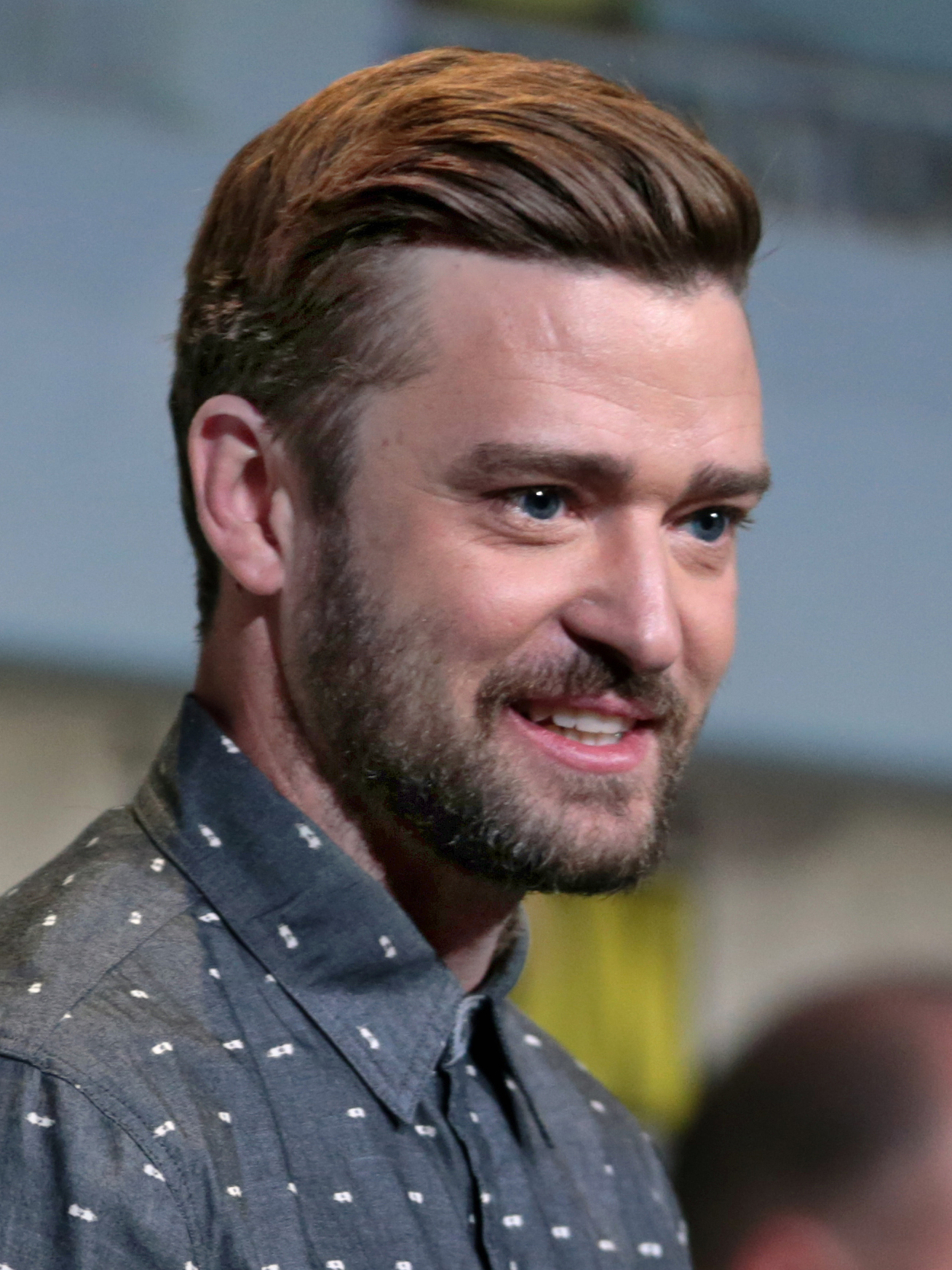
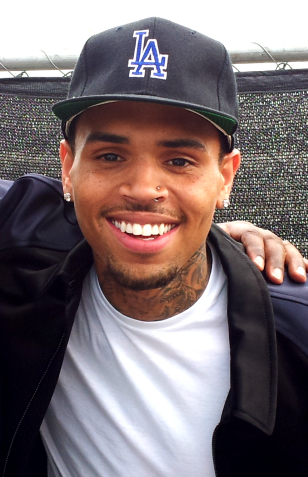
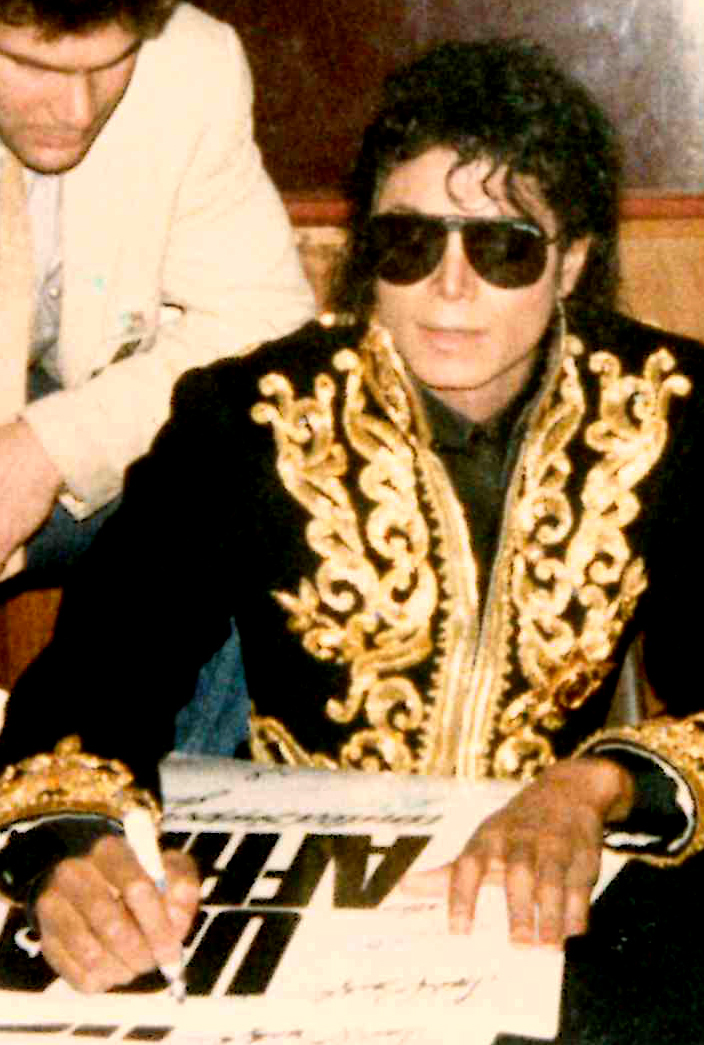
Bieber has cited Justin Timberlake (left), Chris Brown (centre), and Michael Jackson (right) as some of his main musical inspirations.

Bieber has cited Chris Brown, Craig David, Michael Jackson, the Beatles, Boyz II Men, Justin Timberlake, Stevie Wonder, Tupac, and Usher as his musical inspirations. He listened to artists like Jackson and Tracy Chapman as a child, and paid attention to their singing styles. The first covers he uploaded to YouTube included songs by Wonder, Jackson, and Boys II Men, as well as Usher, Timberlake, and Aretha Franklin. Bieber said he idolized Jackson because of his ability to "reach audiences from young to old" and because he "wasn't afraid to be himself".

Believe was influenced by Timberlake, for which Bieber was trying to "create a new sound that people aren't really used to hearing ... like when Timberlake did FutureSex/LoveSounds". Bieber called Chris Brown the "best entertainer of all time" in 2019.

=== Musical style and themes ===
Bieber's music primarily incorporates pop, R&B, dance-pop, and EDM. Justice explored genres such as synth rock, gospel, EDM, R&B, and Afrobeats, while Swag explored synth-pop. During the initial years of his career, Bieber's musical style was described by some critics as being aimed to a more teen pop direction. In 2010, Jody Rosen of Rolling Stone asserted that the content of his music was "offering a gentle introduction" to themes of adolescence, describing his music as being "free of sex itself". His musical diversity and lyrical themes, particularly past the release of Justice, have received critical acclaim.

In January 2012, Bieber told V: "I want to do it at my own pace. I don't want to start singing about things like sex, drugs and swearing." Since then, he has altered his artistry, with albums such as Purpose exploring more serious themes such as his life experiences. His album Changes, released after a hiatus from music, placed further emphasis on his personal growth, religious faith, and relationship with his wife. He expanded upon these themes with release of Justice, which critics praised as a sign of his newfound maturity and outlook on life. AllMusic described Swag as exploring themes such as "loyalty, humility, and faith".

Bieber often incorporates African-American Vernacular English (AAVE) into his songs, such as the word ain't and double negation. According to academics at LEARN Journal, Bieber's usage of AAVE demonstrates its influence within popular music. His use of traditionally Black genres such as hip-hop, R&B, and soul within a broader pop genre has been met with both criticism and discourse.

=== Voice ===
Bieber initially sang with a boy soprano voice, before his voice broke. On his debut album, My World 2.0, critics described Bieber's voice as deeper than it was in his debut EP, due to puberty. Sean Michaels of The Guardian described puberty as "the biggest threat to his career" at the time. Jody Rosen commented that Bieber sang with "swing and rhythmic dexterity" on My World 2.0, describing his tone as "nasal". Bieber began receiving voice coaching from Jan Smith after struggling with his voice breaking.

As an adult singer, Bieber possesses a baritone vocal range. In a review of Purpose, Neil McCormick of The Daily Telegraph complimented his "soft, supple and seductive singing". Caroline Sullivan of The Guardian praised Bieber's "affectedly breathy voice", commenting that "the voice soon palls, but the songs are often interesting". Reviewing Justice, Pitchfork's Rawiya Kameir said that "Bieber is not a powerhouse vocalist" but called him a "compelling one". Kameir complimented the "palatable smoothness" of Bieber's voice.

== Public image ==
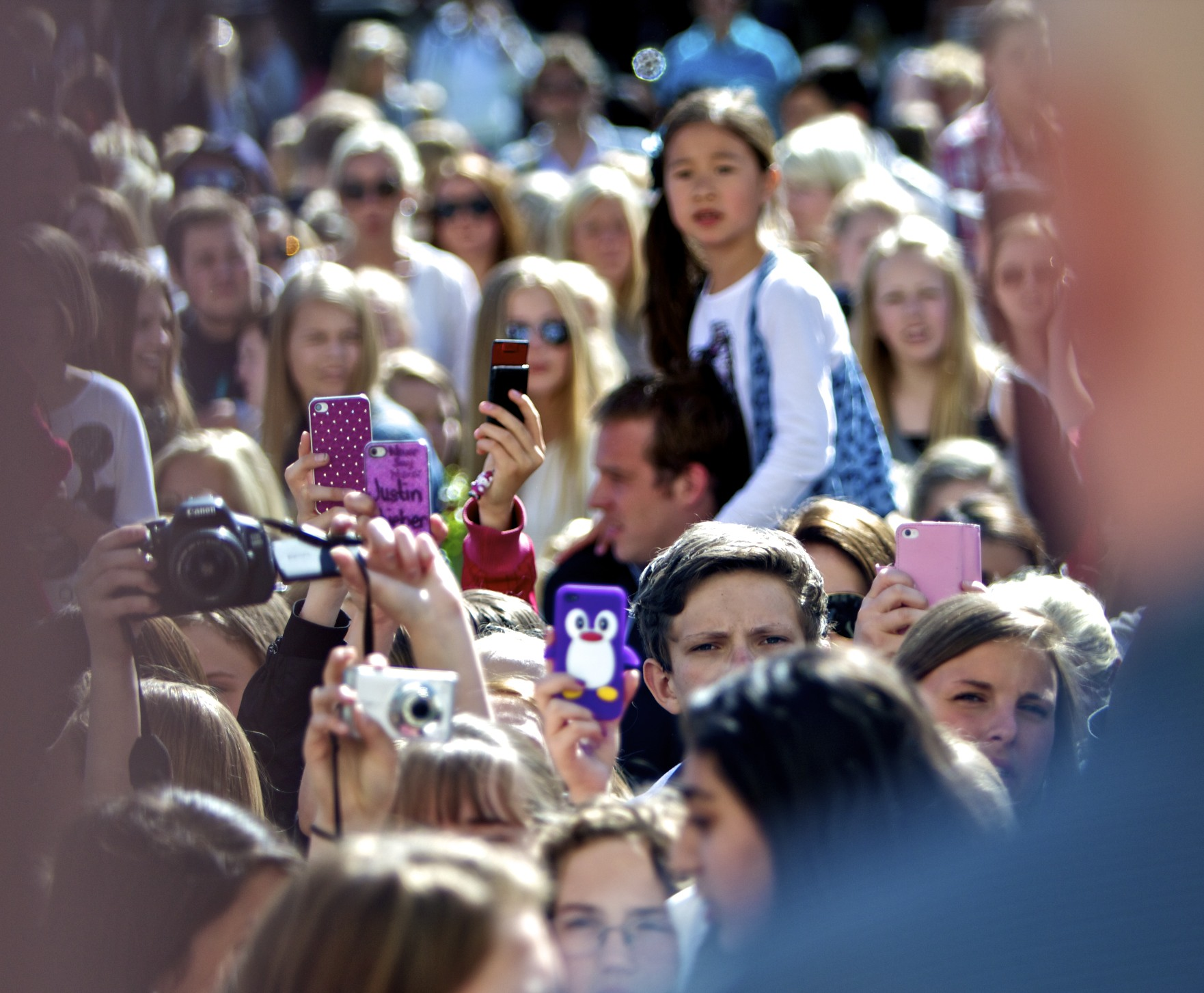
Beliebers gathering around the hotel where Bieber was reportedly staying in Oslo, Norway, in 2012

Usher commented that while he and Bieber were both signed at the same age, "[he] had the chance to ramp up [his] success, where this has happened to Bieber abruptly". As a result, when he was younger, Usher, Braun, Bieber's bodyguard, and other adults surrounding Bieber coached him on handling fame and his public image. In 2013, Bieber said he was "very influenced by Black culture", but he neither thought "of it as Black or white" nor tried to "act or pose in a certain way". To him, it was "a lifestyle-like a suaveness or a swag". Amy Kaufman of The Arizona Republic commented that Bieber's mannerisms "suggest he's mimicking his favorite rappers".

Bieber was often featured in teen magazines such as Tiger Beat, and has been labelled a "teen heartthrob". His teen-pop music, image (especially as a heartthrob to girls), and the media attention he receives have been criticized. Bieber's adoration from some teenage girls was also likened to those of Frank Sinatra in the 1940s and Elvis Presley in the 1950s. His fandom, who came to be known as "Beliebers" and his popularity labelled "Bieber Fever", was also compared to Beatlemania. Bieber reinvented his image multiple times, and in 2012, he changed his hairstyle to resemble more of a pompadour which resembled and drew connections to Presley. He has been a target of Internet message boards such as 4chan. Nick Collins of The Daily Telegraph said that "Bieber's character appears to strike a particularly sour note with his Internet critics" who have questioned his manner of speech, among other things.

In 2014, Bieber adopted the pseudonym Bizzle. During this phase, he donned a quiff and often wore thick gold chains and baseball caps. Following the release of Purpose in 2015, Bieber appeared with bleached blond hair and often wore rock-branded T-shirts—including Marilyn Manson and Kurt Cobain T-shirts—flannel shirts, denim jackets, and ripped jeans. He also wore kilts, a trend of 1990s fashion, on several occasions. Edward Barsamian of Vogue remarked that his fashion during this period was reminiscent of grunge fashion during the 1990s. After his marriage in 2018, Bieber's persona continued to change, and he adopted a more mature image. In an interview with Vogue in February 2019, Bieber said that he would "laugh at his teenage self".

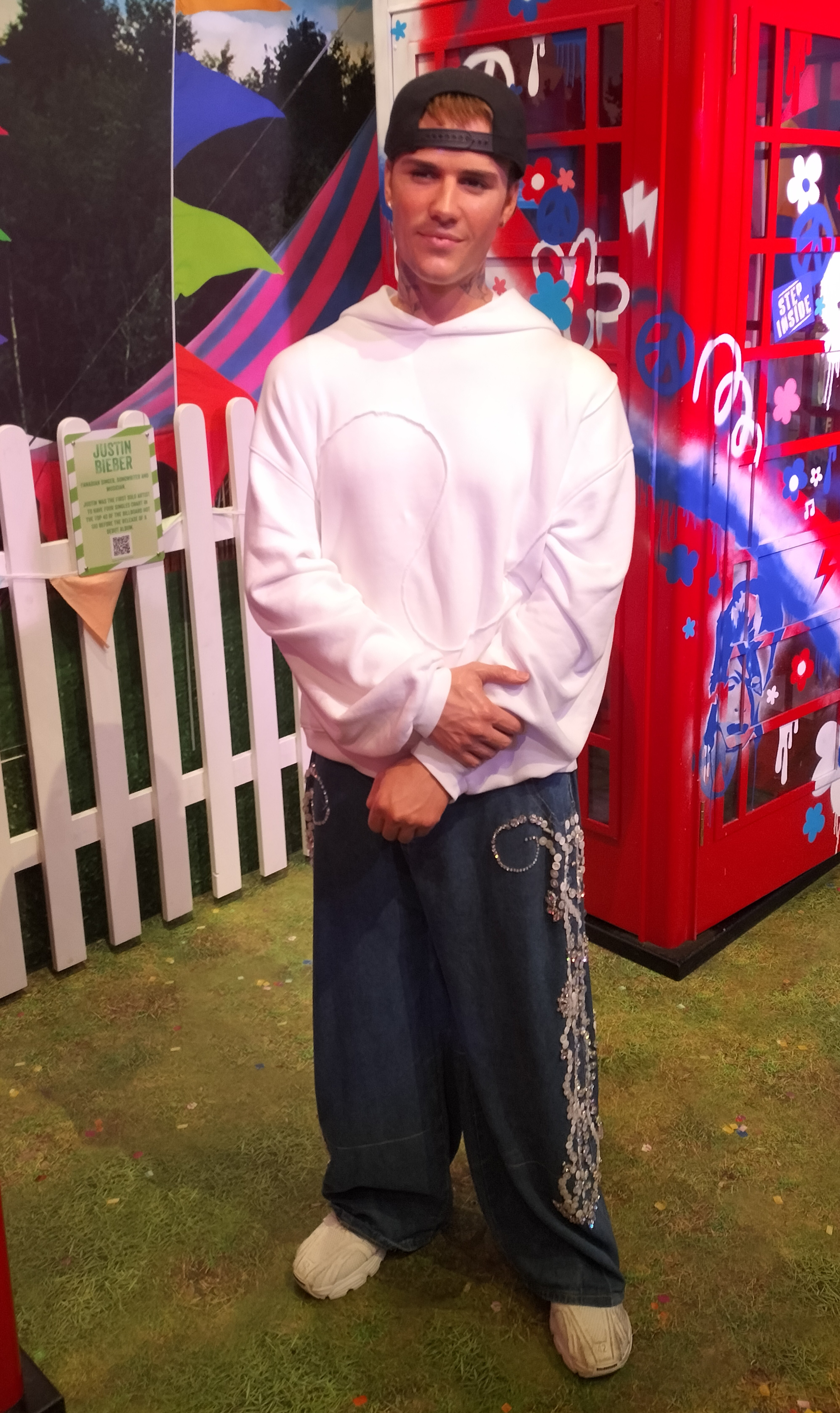
Waxwork of Bieber at Madame Tussauds, London

Wax statues of Bieber are on display at the Madame Tussauds wax museums in New York City, London, and Amsterdam. In 2018, "Steps to Stardom", an exhibit on Bieber's early career, opened in his hometown of Stratford, Ontario at the Stratford Perth Museum. The items on display include a professional drum kit he owned as a younger child, his Grammy Award, microphones, his Stratford Warriors hockey jacket, and personal letters, including one from Michelle Obama. "Steps to Stardom" was originally scheduled to close in October 2018 but the board of the museum extended its stay for at least another year after the exhibit broke attendance records set by its Anne Frank House exhibit in 2015.

Bieber's early fanbase developed on YouTube and predated the release of his debut album, My World. Academic Melissa Avdeeff felt that Braun's decision to "retain Bieber's online following"—instead of opting for a "more traditional" career—made Bieber's fanbase feel more personally connected to him. She said that Bieber's career was symbolic of technology and social media being incorporated into popular music. In July 2010, the Toronto Sun reported that Bieber was the most searched-for celebrity on the Internet. In January 2013, Bieber surpassed Lady Gaga as the most-followed person on Twitter for the first time and held the record for 11 months. Bieber was frequently a trending topic on Twitter when the feature first launched, and was named the top-trending star on the platform in 2010. The Chicago Tribune listed the name of Bieber's fanbase, "Beliebers", among the top words of 2010.

=== Legal issues ===
Bieber had several run-ins with the law before his first arrest in 2014, including when he was accused of reckless driving in his neighbourhood in 2012, charged in Brazil with vandalism in 2013, and was ordered to appear in Argentina within 60 days by a Buenos Aires court to give testimony on an alleged assault on a photographer in 2013.

On January 23, 2014, Bieber was arrested in Miami Beach, Florida, with singer Khalil on suspicion of driving under the influence (DUI), driving with a licence expired by more than six months, and resisting arrest without violence. Police said that Bieber told authorities he had consumed alcohol, smoked marijuana, and taken prescription drugs. He was released from these charges on a $2,500 bond. A toxicology report revealed that Bieber had THC and Xanax in his system at the time of his arrest. In January 2021, he reflected on the event, describing it as "not [his] finest hour". On August 13, 2014, the January DUI case was settled with a plea bargain; Bieber pleaded guilty to resisting an officer without violence and a lesser charge of driving without due care and attention. He was fined US$500 and sentenced to attend a 12-hour anger management course and a program that teaches the impact of drunken driving on victims. As part of the plea bargain, he made a US$50,000 contribution to Our Kids, a local children's charity. Following Bieber's arrest on the DUI charge, more than 270,000 people petitioned the White House seeking to have him deported from the United States. Although the number of signatures received was sufficient to require a response under published White House guidelines, the Obama administration declined substantive comment on the petition.

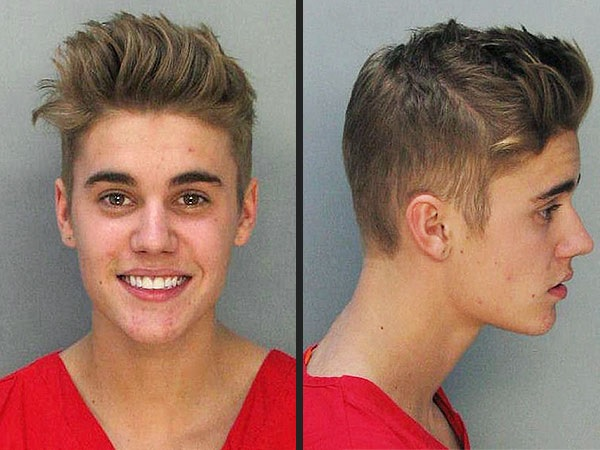
Bieber's mugshots taken on January 23, 2014, after being detained by police in Miami Beach

In 2013 and 2014, Bieber was involved in several controversial incidents. He abandoned his pet monkey in Germany, vomited onstage, was filmed urinating into a bucket, cursed at a photograph of Bill Clinton, wore a gas mask in public, and was involved in an explicit image with a stripper. He also allegedly assaulted his bodyguard and a limo driver. Bieber's uncle, Brad Bieber, said that Bieber's behaviour was related to his break-up with Selena Gomez, who he was in an on-again, off-again relationship with between 2010 and 2018. In its March 2014 edition, Rolling Stone put Bieber on its cover alongside the title "Bad Boy".

One of Bieber's neighbours in Calabasas, California, accused Bieber of throwing eggs at his home on January 9, 2014, and causing thousands of dollars worth of damage. On July 9 of that year, Bieber was charged with one misdemeanour count of vandalism for throwing the eggs. He pled no contest to the charge. (Note: Attributed to multiple references:) On September 1, 2014, Bieber was arrested and charged with assault and dangerous driving near his hometown of Stratford, Ontario, after a collision between a minivan and Bieber's all-terrain vehicle on August 29. Ontario police said that he then "engaged in a physical altercation" with an occupant of the minivan. He was released shortly and his lawyer blamed the incident on "the unwelcome presence of paparazzi".

In July 2017, the Chinese government banned Bieber from performing in China. The Bureau released a statement, explaining, "In order to ... purify the Chinese performance environment, it is not suitable to bring in badly behaved entertainers". In 2021, several Chinese streaming sites removed Bieber's scenes in Friends: The Reunion.

== Legacy ==
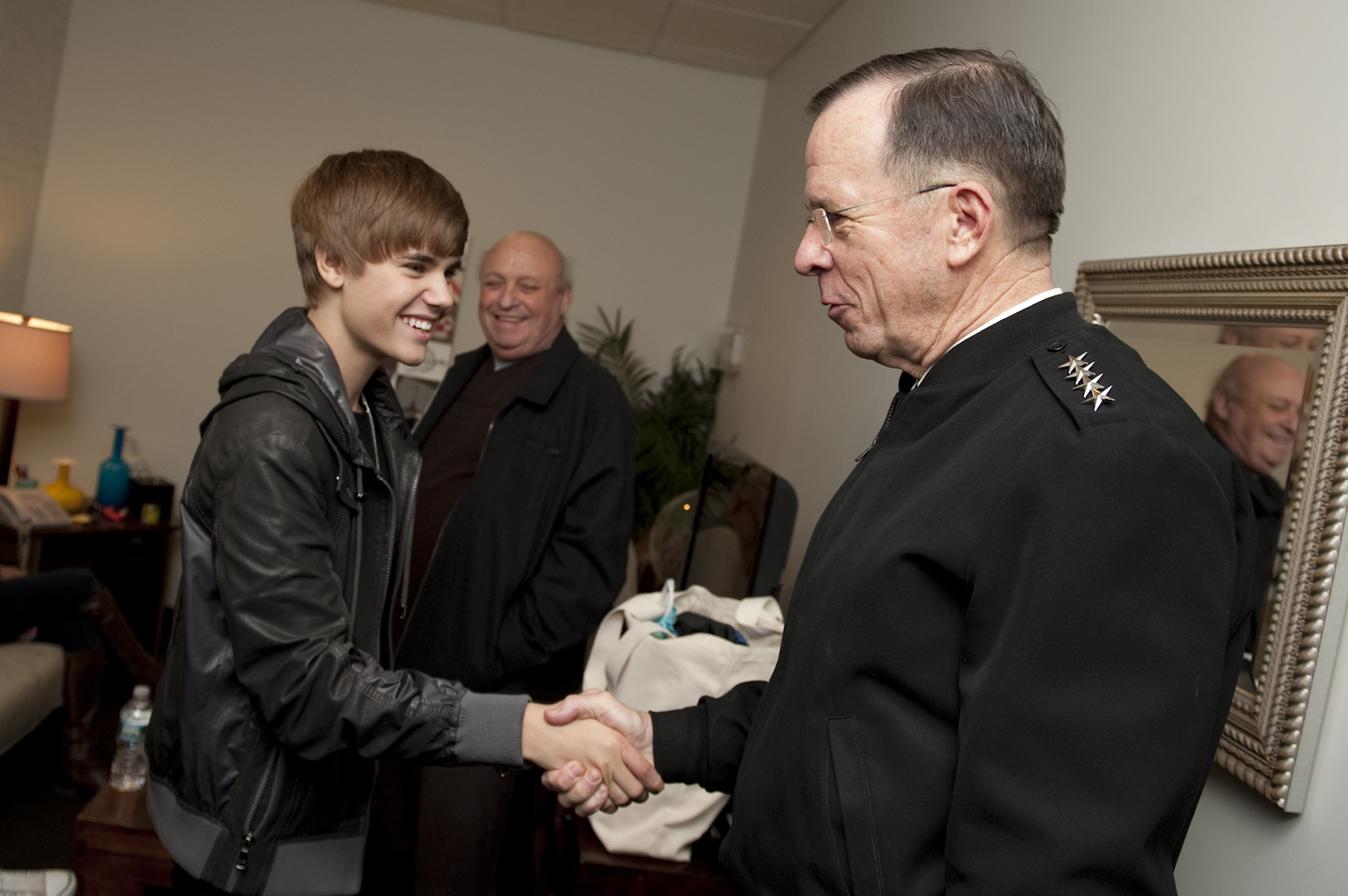
Bieber being greeted by the US chairman of the Joint Chiefs of Staff, Mike Mullen, in 2011

Bieber has been credited with reinventing pop stardom for over a decade, and has been referred to as the "Prince of Pop" and formerly the "King of Teen Pop" by journalists. Highlighting his longevity, he was awarded the MTV Award for Best New Artist in 2010 and the MTV Award for Artist of the Year in 2021. Rolling Stone India referred to him as the "biggest popstar of our age", "one of the most captivating artists of the century" and "one of the world's most successful artists of all time". Bieber is often described as a pop icon, or simply an icon. In a 2011 article comparing the cultural significance of Bieber to Facebook founder Mark Zuckerberg, Orlando Sentinel wrote: "Out of all the cultural icons who influence and inspire today's society, Justin Bieber is without a doubt one of the most prominent". He is often credited as an important figure in bridging music and social media; Variety dubbed him "a once-in-a-generation superstar who charted a swift and stunning rise from precocious YouTube talent to global phenomenon".

In respect to Bieber's success as a teenager to a young adult, Variety said that Bieber is arguably the first mega pop star to come of age entirely in the social media era and called him an "Internet icon". The Conversation's Jo Adetunji said that Bieber is "one of the most successful pop singers of recent years". Regarding his album Purpose (2015), which he said reached "beyond the moment and trends" of that period, Adetunji argued that Bieber should be considered a serious creative artist. Adetunji compared the album to Madonna's Ray of Light (1998), Alanis Morissette's Jagged Little Pill (1995) and Justin Timberlake's FutureSex/LoveSounds (2006). Bieber has influenced various artists including Shawn Mendes, Why Don't We, and Niall Horan. Singers Dua Lipa and Charlie Puth have stated that they were influenced by the discovery of Bieber on YouTube which inspired them to achieve the same.

== Other ventures ==
=== Products and endorsements ===
In 2010, Bieber signed a deal with Proactiv. In the same year, Bieber partnered with Nicole by OPI to launch a nail polish line called the One Less Lonely Girl Collection, which sold exclusively in Walmart. Bieber's nail polish line sold one million bottles less than two months after its release. Bieber endorsed Adidas, beside Derrick Rose and Venus Williams, in 2012. He became the new "face" and "body" of Calvin Klein in early 2015. The following year, Bieber's promotion of Calvin Klein on social media caused activity related to the brand to rise on platforms by over 18,000 percent. Bieber has been credited with boosting the careers of singers such as Carly Rae Jepsen and Madison Beer when he tweeted about them.

Bieber has released four fragrances. He launched his debut fragrance, Someday, in 2011; it grossed more than three million US dollars in sales at Macy's in under three weeks. He launched his second fragrance, Girlfriend, in June 2012. His third fragrance, the Key, was launched in July 2013, and his latest fragrance, Justin Bieber Collector's Edition, launched in 2014. In January 2019, Bieber launched his own clothing line called Drew House, consisting of a wide range of products. Most products feature the brand's defining symbol of a simple yellow smiley-face logo with the text "drew" written across the front. Bieber trademarked the name for his company in February 2018. In September 2019, after a year-long collaboration with Schmidt's Naturals CEO, Michael Cammarata, Bieber released his deodorant line, Here + Now, designed for sensitive skin.

In October 2020, Bieber collaborated with Crocs to create a version of the brand's clogs called "Crocs x Justin Bieber". Bieber collaborated with Tim Hortons in late 2021 to launch a specialty version of Timbits known as "timbiebs". CNN credited the promotion's role in contributing to an increase in Tim Hortons' sales by 10.3% in the fourth quarter of 2021. In February 2022, Bieber starred in Balenciaga's first 2022 campaign alongside Kim Kardashian and Isabelle Huppert. In May 2022, Bieber and Tim Hortons partnered once again in a new collaboration called the Biebs Brew, a French vanilla cold brew, which was available in North American stores beginning June 6, 2022.

In December 2022, Bieber launched a clean water technology company called Generosity that aims to provide sustainable drinking water by reducing the usage of single-serve plastic. Alongside Micah Cravalho, he showcased 150 water fountains at the 2022 FIFA World Cup held in Qatar. Generosity fountains dispense refillable alkaline water after connecting to a water source. In 2025, Bieber launched a clothing brand called Skylrk. The brand releases products such as sneakers and sunglasses.

=== Philanthropy ===
Bieber supports Pencils of Promise, a charity founded by Adam Braun, the younger brother of Scooter Braun, Bieber's manager. The organization builds schools in developing countries, and Bieber became the manager for the organization's campaign in Guatemala. He serves as a celebrity spokesman for the organization by running advertisements for the charity and its campaign Schools4All. He promises to visit schools that donate the most funds to the organization. He takes part in the charity's fund-raising galas and donates parts of the proceeds from his concerts and Someday line of fragrances. In 2010, Bieber supported a campaign for PETA by urging fans to adopt abandoned pets from shelters. Bieber donated his hair to Ellen DeGeneres during his appearance in her talk show The Ellen DeGeneres Show in March 2011. His hair sold on eBay for more than $40,000 and the proceeds benefited the animal rescue charity, The Gentle Barn. Following the earthquake and tsunami in Japan in March 2011, Bieber donated proceeds from his concerts in Japan to Japanese Red Cross in May 2011. In December 2011, Bieber donated $100,000 to Whitney Elementary School in Las Vegas to provide students from low income families. Bieber has supported Charity: Water, a nonprofit that brings potable drinking water to people in developing countries. On his birthday in 2011 and 2012, he launched his campaign to urge his followers to donate on Twitter. Bieber has also supported Children's Miracle Network Hospitals and Alzheimer's Association.

In September 2017, Bieber donated $25,000 to the American Red Cross to help people in Texas after the severe destruction caused by Hurricane Harvey. On February 7, 2020, Bieber donated $100,000 to Julie Coker, a 22-year-old fan who works in mental health awareness. That same month, he made a donation to Beijing Chunmiao Children Aid Foundation in China to support COVID-19 relief. Bieber and Ariana Grande collaborated on the single "Stuck with U", released in May 2020 as the first of series of singles coordinated by Scooter Braun to support the COVID-19 pandemic. All net proceeds from the song went to the First Responders Children's Foundation to fund grants and scholarships for children of first responders and health care workers who worked on the front lines during the pandemic. By August 2021, the single had raised over $3,500,000. In September 2020, Bieber and Chance the Rapper announced that they had partnered with Cash App and would donate $250,000 to fans who were struggling during the pandemic.

In March 2021, Bieber visited the California State Prison in Los Angeles County along with his wife Hailey and pastor Judah Smith at the invitation of Scott Budnick. Bieber met with inmates involved in The Urban Ministry Institute and expressed support for Budnick's Anti-Recidivism Coalition. During the visit, Bieber committed to provide buses to transport relatives of the inmates who have been unable to see them due to the COVID-19 pandemic in California. He described his visit to the prison as a "life-changing experience that [he] will never forget".

=== Activism and political views ===
Regarding sexual abstinence, Bieber told Rolling Stone in 2011, "I don't think you should have sex with anyone unless you love them". He added that he does not "believe in abortion", and that it is "like killing a baby". When asked about the case of abortion with regard to rape, he said, "I guess I haven't been in that position, so I wouldn't be able to judge that". In 2022, amidst Roe v. Wade being overturned, both Bieber and his wife expressed disapproval, with Bieber stating, "I think women should have the choice what to do with their own bodies". He views sexual orientation as "everyone's own decision", and he has contributed to the It Gets Better Project, a non-profit group aiming to prevent suicide among LGBT youth. Bieber also opposed the Trump administration family separation policy, calling for US president Donald Trump to "let those kids out of cages" in 2019.

Bieber was among the list of celebrities opposing Bill S.978, also known as the Commercial Felony Streaming Act, which would have made unauthorized streaming a felony instead of a misdemeanor. He stated that the bill's sponsor, US Senator Amy Klobuchar, "needs to be locked up, put away in cuffs!" While the bill did not ultimately pass, it was later reintroduced by Senator Thom Tillis as the Protecting Lawful Streaming Act, and was signed into law by Donald Trump in December 2020 as part of the omnibus Consolidated Appropriations Act, 2021. In 2023, Bieber posted an Instagram Story with the words "Praying for Israel" overlayed on an image of ruined buildings in the Gaza Strip. The post was deleted within an hour, and reposted with the same wording but no background.

== Achievements ==
In 2013, Bieber received a diamond certification from the Recording Industry Association of America (RIAA) for his single "Baby", which at the time became the highest-certified digital single of all time. Bieber is credited with five diamond certifications from the RIAA. He has won 2 Grammy Awards out of 23 nominations, 1 Latin Grammy Award, 8 Juno Awards, 2 Brit Awards, 26 Billboard Music Awards, 19 American Music Awards, 22 MTV Europe Music Awards (the most wins for any artist), 23 Teen Choice Awards (the most wins for a male individual), and 6 MTV Video Music Awards. At age 19, Bieber received the Milestone Award at the 2013 Billboard Music Awards in recognition for breaking boundaries with his creativity and contribution to the musical landscape. As of 2024, all of Bieber's studio projects are certified platinum or higher by the RIAA.

Bieber is the first artist in history to occupy the entire top three of the UK singles chart. He is the first male artist since Justin Timberlake in 2007 to have three number-ones from an album. He is also the first solo artist to chart three solo songs in the top five of the Billboard Hot 100 simultaneously, and the first as a lead act since the Beatles in 1964. "Love Yourself" topped Billboard's Year-End Hot 100 Chart in 2016, followed by "Sorry" at number two, and made Bieber only the third artist in history to hold the top-two positions of the Billboard Year-End Hot 100, after the Beatles in 1964 and Usher in 2004. At age 17, Bieber was named amongst the Time 100 world's most influential people list and was ranked number two on the Forbes Highest-Paid Celebrities Under 30 list. He went on to be included on the Forbes annual list five more times: in 2012, 2013, 2014, 2016 and 2017. He was also included on Forbes' list of the top 10 most powerful celebrities in 2011, 2012, and 2013.

Bieber is the first artist to chart new number-one singles in consecutive weeks on the Billboard Hot 100. He is the youngest (21) male soloist to debut at number 1 on the Hot 100; the youngest (25) male soloist to spend 200 cumulative weeks in the top 10 of the Hot 100; the youngest (27) solo artist to have 8 number-one albums on the Billboard 200, a record held by Elvis Presley since 1965; the first male soloist to simultaneously debut a song and an album at number one in the US; and the first male soloist to spend 59 consecutive weeks in the top 10 of the Hot 100. Bieber is the first artist to reach number 1 on 7 multi-metric Billboard charts: Hot 100, Hot Country Songs, Hot Dance/Electronic Songs, Hot Latin Songs, Hot R&B Songs, Hot R&B/Hip-Hop Songs, and Hot Rap Songs. He is the artist with the most cumulative weeks at number one (56) on the Billboard Canadian Hot 100.

Throughout his career, Bieber has sold an estimated 150 million records worldwide, making him one of the best-selling music artists of all time. As of 2024, he has set 35 Guinness World Records in his career, including eight that were achieved from the success of his album Purpose. These records include the most streamed track on Spotify in one week, the most streamed album on Spotify in one week, the most simultaneous tracks on the Billboard Hot 100, and the most simultaneous new entries on the Billboard Hot 100 by a solo artist, among others. Bieber was named Billboard's top male artist for 2016 and ranked seventh on the magazine's Top Artists chart for the 2010s. Billboard ranked him at number 55 on its list "Greatest of All Time Artists", number 38 on its "Greatest of All Time Hot 100 Artists", and number 8 on its "Greatest Pop Stars of the 21st Century". In 2012, Bieber was presented with the Queen Elizabeth II Diamond Jubilee Medal by the former prime minister of Canada, Stephen Harper.

== Discography ==
Studio albums

- My World 2.0 (2010)
- Under the Mistletoe (2011)
- Believe (2012)
- Purpose (2015)
- Changes (2020)
- Justice (2021)
- Swag (2025)
- Swag II (2025)

== Filmography ==
- Justin Bieber: Never Say Never (2011)
- Katy Perry: Part of Me (2012)
- Zendaya: Behind the Scenes (2012)
- Justin Bieber's Believe (2013)
- Behaving Badly (2014)
- Lennon or McCartney (2014)
- Zoolander 2 (2016)
- Bodyguards: Secret Lives from the Watchtower (2016)
- Popstar: Never Stop Never Stopping (2016)
- Killing Hasselhoff (2017)
- Justin Bieber: Seasons (2020)
- Justin Bieber: Our World (2021)
- Kids Are Growing Up: A Story About a Kid Named Laroi (2024)

== Tours ==
- My World Tour (2010–2011)
- Believe Tour (2012–2013)
- Purpose World Tour (2016–2017)
- Justice World Tour (2022)

== See also ==
- List of best-selling music artists
- List of highest-certified music artists in the United States
- List of Billboard Hot 100 chart achievements and milestones
- List of Canadian Grammy Award winners and nominees
- Forbes Celebrity 100
- List of Spotify streaming records
- List of most-streamed artists on Spotify
- List of most-subscribed YouTube channels
- List of most-followed Instagram accounts
- List of most-followed Twitter accounts
