= Nowhere but Up =

Book by Pattie Mallette and A.J. Gregory

- Author: Pattie Mallette; A.J. Gregory
- Original title: Nowhere but Up: The Story of Justin Bieber's Mom
- Language: English
- Genre: Memoir
- Publisher: Revell, Baker Publishing Group
- Publication date: September 18, 2012
- Publication place: Canada
- Media type: Print, digital
- Pages: 220
- ISBN: 978-0-8007-2189-3

Nowhere but Up is a memoir written by Pattie Mallette (the mother of Canadian pop singer Justin Bieber) with A.J. Gregory. It was based on Justin Bieber's song "Up" from the album My World 2.0. The novel follows Mallette's struggle as a teenager through drugs and theft to finding God and having a child at 18 years old.

Published in September 2012, the book entered the New York Times Best Seller list at number 17 during the first week of release.
