= LEARN Journal =

- Discipline: Linguistics
- Language: English
- Edited by: Supakorn Phoocharoensil

Publication details
- Former name(s): Language Institute Journal (2003–2009, 2012)
- History: 2013–Present
- Publisher: Language Institute, Thammasat University (Thailand)
- Frequency: Biannually
- Open access: Yes

Standard abbreviations
- ISO 4: LEARN J.

Indexing
- ISSN: 2630-0672 (print); 2672-9431 (web)

Links
- Journal homepage

The LEARN Journal: Language Education and Acquisition Research Network is a bi-annual, peer-reviewed academic journal focused on the field of applied linguistics, particularly the study and learning of English. The journal was established in 2013 and is published by the Language Institute at Thammasat University.

== History ==
In its current form, the Journal was previously published as the Language Institute Journal beginning in 2003. In 2013, the Journal changed its name to the Language Education and Acquisition Research Network (LEARN) Journal.

== Reputation ==
LEARN Journal is one of two Scopus-indexed journals that focus on language studies in Thailand.

== Accessibility ==
The journal publishes all material in open access format.

== See also ==
- List of education journals
- Educational psychology
