= Justin Bieber's Believe =

- Theatrical release poster
- Directed by: Jon M. Chu
- Produced by: Justin Bieber; Scooter Braun; Bill O'Dowd; Usher Raymond IV
- Starring: Justin Bieber
- Cinematography: Karsten "Crash" Gopinath
- Edited by: Jillian Moul; Avi Youabian
- Music by: Nathan Lanier
- Production companies: Bieber Time Films; Dolphin Films; Scooter Braun Films
- Distributed by: Open Road Films
- Release date: December 25, 2013
- Running time: 92 minutes
- Country: United States
- Language: English
- Budget: $5 million
- Box office: $32.2 million

Justin Bieber's Believe is a 2013 American concert film and the sequel to Justin Bieber: Never Say Never (2011), both centering on Canadian singer Justin Bieber. It was distributed through Open Road Films in the United States and Canada, premiering on December 18, 2013, and being officially released to theaters on December 25, 2013. The film received generally negative reviews from critics and grossed $32.2 million at the worldwide box office.

== Plot ==
The sequel to Never Say Never continues to focus on Bieber's rise to international fame as he embarks on his Believe Tour. In new interviews with Bieber, the movie reveals long-awaited answers to questions about his passion to make music, relationships and coming of age in the spotlight as well as never-before-seen concert footage, and behind-the-scenes access. The film also features interviews with Justin's mother Pattie Mallette, mentor Usher Raymond IV, manager Scooter Braun, recording artist Ludacris, as well as others.

== Background ==
Rumors of a sequel to Never Say Never began surfacing in the media around May 2012, when Bieber himself hinted a possible sequel for some time. It wasn't until January 2013 when the project was confirmed by Bieber himself tweeting about it. Concert footage was filmed during Justin's Believe Tour on January 26–27, 2013, at Miami's American Airlines Arena. Two months later, in March 2013, a $4–5 million budget was appointed for the production of the sequel. On October 11, 2013, it was confirmed that Jon M. Chu reprised his role as director for the biopic. Meanwhile, Justin Bieber released a teaser trailer on his kidrauhl YouTube channel for the sequel to Never Say Never with the tagline "There's more to his story" and the hashtag #BelieveMovie confirming the sequel title as "Believe", to be released on Christmas Day in 3D. The official trailer was released on Yahoo! Movies on November 15, 2013. The day after the trailer was released, director Jon Chu posted a photo on his Instagram account, noting on the caption that Believe would not be released in 3D as the teaser trailer and rumors previously suggested. The film's premiere was held in Los Angeles, California on December 18, 2013.

== Cast ==
Main

- Justin Bieber

Secondary

- Scooter Braun
- Ryan Good
- Usher
- Pattie Mallette
- Jeremy Bieber

Cameos/Appearances

- Mike Posner
- will.i.am
- Ellen DeGeneres
- Ryan Seacrest
- Jon M. Chu
- Nicki Minaj
- Big Sean
- Zach Galifianakis
- Ludacris

== Release ==
=== Box office ===
In the United States, Believe grossed $3.1 million during its first three days and was projected to generate $4.5 million in ticket sales during its five-day debut. This is a dismal performance compared to his 2011 film which grossed $12.4 million on its opening day and $29.5 million during its opening weekend. On its third day (a Friday), Believe grossed just $790,000, putting it in an underwhelming 14th place just two days after its release. The film made a domestic total of $6,206,566 before closing on January 16. Overseas, the film earned $4,773,591, totaling the film's worldwide take to $10,980,157.

=== Critical reception ===
The film was met with mixed to negative reviews from critics. On review aggregator website Rotten Tomatoes, the film has a 53% rating, based on 15 reviews, with an average rating of 5.08/10. Metacritic reports a 39 out of 100 rating, based on 10 critics, indicating "generally unfavorable" reviews.

Mark Hirsh of The Boston Globe stated the film "...amounts to damage control by way of distraction". David Edelstein of Vulture said, "My 15-year-old daughter beliebes with all her heart that Justin is everything he appears to be: an angel from on high (he descends to the stage on giant wings fashioned from guitars, drums, and other implements of his magic) but also humble, a guy in a room writing songs from the heart, songs he needs so bad just to get out. Most of those songs are about how much he wants to be your boyfriend. The work is hard, given that there are a limited number of words that rhyme with 'girl.' Squirrel. Hurl. In one number, he tells his fans that he needs a safety belt and lifts his shirt to put it on, revealing his well-defined abs. The roar shook the movie theater. Later, someone's home video shows a little girl opening a Christmas gift containing tickets to a Bieber concert. When she is finished shrieking and then weeping she begins to speak in tongues."

Todd Gilchrist of The Wrap said, "Ultimately, it's hard to look at the film from any sort of non-fan perspective and not see it as less than hagiography – a tribute to Bieber's success, and a complimentary portrait of how well he's supposedly dealt with it." Pamela McClintock of The Hollywood Reporter wrote that "many of Bieber's fans are staying away. Rivals question why Open Road—owned by giant exhibitors Regal and AMC—decided to open Believe on Christmas, the most crowded time of the year."

Stephanie Merry of The Washington Post wrote the film "reveals little about the singer", adding "it offers no insights and few anecdotes about the real Justin Bieber". He gave the movie a rating of one and a half stars out of five, stating that "he's human, after all. If only the documentary would show it." Mikael Wood of the Los Angeles Times criticized the film writing "talent is perhaps the least interesting thing about him" although stating in favor of fans that "those as hopelessly devoted may get something out of Believe but they deserve more."

Sheila O'Mally of RogerEbert.com gave the film two and a half out of three stars. O'Mally said the film was "a strangely uneven experience, and you sense that there may be some really interesting questions that could be asked and answered, if everyone could stop being so in awe of the young pop-music god in their midst."

== Home media ==
Believe was released on Blu-ray and DVD on April 8, 2014.

== See also ==
- Justin Bieber: Seasons (2020)
