= Justin Bieber: Never Say Never =

- Theatrical release poster
- Directed by: Jon M. Chu
- Produced by: Scooter Braun; Justin Bieber; Antonio "L.A." Reid; Usher Raymond IV; Dan Cutforth; Jane Lipsitz
- Starring: Justin Bieber
- Cinematography: Reed Smoot
- Edited by: Avi Youabian; Jay Cassidy; Jillian Moul
- Music by: Deborah Lurie
- Production companies: Insurge Pictures; MTV Films; IDJ Media; Scooter Braun Films; L.A. Reid Media; AEG Live; Island Records
- Distributed by: Paramount Pictures
- Release date: February 11, 2011
- Running time: 105 minutes
- Country: United States
- Language: English
- Budget: $13 million
- Box office: $99 million

Justin Bieber: Never Say Never is a 2011 American 3-D concert film centering on Canadian singer Justin Bieber. It was released in the United States on February 11, 2011.

Never Say Never's total worldwide sales reached $99.03 million, and received mediocre reviews from critics. In the United States, it held the former record for the highest grossing music concert movie since 1984, and the third-highest grossing documentary since 1982.

A sequel titled Justin Bieber's Believe was released on December 25, 2013.

== Plot ==
The film follows the pop star Justin Bieber during 10 days counting down to what is considered his biggest performance, that of August 31, 2010 in Madison Square Garden, which sold out in 22 minutes. It shows footage of the performances during this time from his My World Tour. It shows excited female fans, and several instances of the "One Less Lonely Girl" routine of inviting a girl on stage for him to serenade and give flowers to, and of surprising random girls with free tickets to his concerts. The main people around Bieber, being like family and good friends to him, are interviewed, but Bieber himself is not. Various instances of praying together before a show are shown.

The film also includes a visit Bieber made to his hometown while being in Canada for the tour. He is scolded for having damaged his voice while having fun with his old friends. He reluctantly accepts the postponement of a performance in Syracuse. He is not allowed to speak for some days, and thus recovers enough to do the next performance, at MSG.

Also included are some stories and old videos of Bieber's childhood. He was raised by his mother, but also had a very special bond with his maternal step-grandfather. The latter still gets emotional about the time that Bieber and his mother moved to Atlanta.

== Cast ==
- Justin Bieber
- Usher
- Jaden Smith
- Sean Kingston
- Snoop Dogg
- Ludacris
- Miley Cyrus
- Boyz II Men
- Scooter Braun
- L.A. Reid
- Jeremy Bieber
- Hayden Thompson
- Jay Leno (archive footage from The Tonight Show with Jay Leno)
- Chelsea Handler (archive footage from Chelsea Lately)
- George Lopez (archive footage from Lopez Tonight)

== Background ==
=== Pre-production ===
On August 2, 2010, Deadline Hollywood reported that Paramount Pictures was prepping a film featuring the singer. The website also reported that the film, described as a "feature biopic", would be directed by the Academy Award-winning An Inconvenient Truth's director Davis Guggenheim. The untitled film was said to also include performances from Bieber's My World Tour throughout. Bieber's manager Scooter Braun and Island Def Jam president L.A. Reid were tapped to produce, and the film was tentatively given a Valentine's Day 2011 release date. After the report was published by Deadline, Bieber confirmed the news on his official Twitter account, and verified that it would be released around February 11, 2011. In a following tweet, Bieber stated that the performances for the film would be those set to take place at Madison Square Garden on the tour. On August 4, 2010, Deadline reported that Guggenheim had dropped out of the directing position for the film, in order to focus on promotion for Waiting for "Superman".

After the future of the film was up in the air for a few days, on August 13, 2010, it was reported that Step Up 3D director Jon Chu was recruited to direct the film. On directing the film, Chu said that he "jumped at the opportunity to tell a story with honesty and heart", as most people did not know Bieber had a "true underdog story". Chu went on to say that he hoped to tell his story in a "compelling, genuine way, using all source materials available to convey his tale of becoming an icon for this digital age."

In another interview, Chu said that the movie was for fans and non-fans alike, commenting, "we're gonna tell the underdog story of where he came from." He later explained that it was fascinating due to Bieber's story had much to do with the modern "digital lifestyle", such as using YouTube, and how it is "a pretty cool story for our time." On the type of film, Chu said "There's not going to be acted-out scenes and I can't talk about the rest. It's not your typical concert film and it's not going to be a biopic, but it is about his life."

=== Development ===
"We had this sort of hyperlink idea through the film, which is what makes it really an interesting movie; it's not like the other concert films where you are onstage and then go backstage and then onstage and go backstage. It's not just the concert ... this is a musical movie, when words aren't enough in telling the stories of his life, [we use music]."

— Jon Chu on the "hyperlink" plot idea of Never Say Never.

On August 24, 2010, on Twitter, Bieber and Chu announced that fans could enter a contest to be a part of the movie by sending a home video singing Bieber's "That Should Be Me", or they should "Show us how 'U Smile'" by sending in a photo or video. The contest lasted for twenty-four hours. On August 31, 2010, filming took place at his concert at Madison Square Garden for scenes for the film, and Bieber donned white and purple attire, his tour colors. Bieber performed his set list, and in addition to opening acts, Sean Kingston and Jessica Jarrell, Iyaz, Boyz II Men, Usher, Miley Cyrus, Ludacris and Jaden Smith appeared and performed songs with the singer. In a review, Jocelyn Vena of MTV News said "Any signs that Bieber had fallen ill only two days before weren't remotely evident. He turned his swag on ... for the cameras filming the show for his upcoming film.

In explaining the film's plot, Chu said that it was similar to a "hyperlink", unlike other concert films which only saw music and backstage action, but told the story of the rise of his career, and "stories of his life", using music. The director further explained, "You know, if he's talking about his youth and talking about his magnetic smile, you start to hear 'U Smile' start to creep in the background and the underscore ... you see images from his life, and at the end of that song, the spotlight from the number connects with the spotlight of his tour bus and he goes back into his bed." On the film's direction toward his haters and naysayers, the director commented that the top thing they wanted in the film was "honesty", explaining "People have a very preconceived notion of Justin Bieber and people can think whatever they want, but we wanted to show the honest other side of Justin."

== Promotion ==
On October 13, 2010, Chu tweeted to send Bieber's fans on an Internet scavenger hunt to solve the puzzle of the movie poster, which would in turn reveal the title of the film. Pieces of the puzzle were revealed by celebrities such as Usher, Ellen DeGeneres, and Ryan Seacrest, and Bieber's manager Scooter Braun. The final piece was revealed two days later, tweeted by USA Today, and it revealed the movie's title, Justin Bieber: Never Say Never.

The first trailer for the film debuted on October 26, 2010, consisting of home and behind-the-scenes footage chronicling his rise to fame, and interviews with people such as Usher and Scooter Braun. Matt Elias of MTV News said it contains "eye-popping visuals" and "sweeping camera moves" to give an "epic" feeling. Elias also said the trailer shows that the movie was more than a concert film, and "takes you beyond the stage and shows his everyday life", while making a focus on his fans. On the day of the trailer's release, Bieber surprised the audience at the Los Angeles date of his My World Tour by unveiling the trailer. On November 22, 2010, it was revealed that the movie would be screened early on February 9, 2011, for select viewers. Fans were able to purchase tickets for it beginning November 29, 2010, and could also receive official movie merchandise like a souvenir VIP lanyard, a glow stick, a bracelet and purple 3-D glasses for the film. The second official trailer was released on November 22, 2010. It emphasized the 3-D aspect, starting with Bieber throwing popcorn and silly string as the words "This Valentine's Day, See Bieber ... Like Never Before" portrayed across the screen. Shown are montages of home footage, behind the scenes footage, and tour clips, including Bieber throwing his shirt into the crowd. The end of the trailer shows Bieber learning about the cameras used to shoot the 3-D film, as well as trying out the film's trademark purple 3-D glasses.

== Production ==
The news for the film came through July 2010. Production began that summer, leading up to his concert at Madison Square Garden. The film, whose name was not released until October 2010, was directed by Jon Chu. Chu says the film is a documentary, without any "acted-out scenes."

== Reception ==
=== Critical response ===
On Rotten Tomatoes, the film has an approval rating of 66% based on reviews from 107 critics, with an average rating of 5.79/10. The site's critical consensus reads, "As a tour documentary, it's rather uninspired -- but as a 3D glimpse of a building pop culture phenomenon, Never Say Never is undeniably entertaining." On Metacritic, the film holds a 52/100 score based on 22 critic reviews.

=== Box office ===
It topped the Friday box office by an estimated grossing of $12.4 million on its opening day from 3,105 theaters. It grossed $29,514,054 for the weekend, and was narrowly beaten by the romantic comedy Just Go With It, which grossed $31 million. Never Say Never is said to have exceeded industry expectations, nearly matching the $31.1 million grossed by Miley Cyrus's 2008 3-D concert film, Hannah Montana & Miley Cyrus: Best of Both Worlds Concert, which holds the record for the top debut for a music-documentary. Furthermore, it grossed higher first weekend totals than the 2009 concert film, Michael Jackson's This Is It, which is the highest grossing documentary/concert film of all time, and at least two-times more than fellow teen act Jonas Brothers' 2009 3D concert film, Jonas Brothers: The 3D Concert Experience, making more in two days than the Jonas Brothers concert did in its entire run.

Its total worldwide sales reached $98,441,954. In the United States, it is the highest grossing music concert movie since 1984 and the third-highest grossing documentary since 1982. It was surpassed by Taylor Swift: The Eras Tour in 2023 as the most profitable concert film in history.

=== Audience ===
According to Paramount's exit data, the audience during the weekend of February 11–13, 2011, was revealed to be 84% female. Of the same audience, 67% of viewers were under 25 years of age.

== Director's fan cut ==
The film was re-released limitedly in an extended version titled Justin Bieber: Never Say Never - Director's Fan Cut on February 25, 2011, in 3-D theaters in the United States and Canada. This version has 40 minutes of new footage, while 30 minutes of the original have been removed, so the running time is 115 minutes - 10 minutes longer than the original version. The screenings are preceded by a short film of The Legion of Extraordinary Dancers, another award-winning project by director Jon M. Chu.

== Home video ==
Paramount Home Entertainment released the film on DVD and Blu-ray on May 13, 2011, in the United States. To promote the release of the film to home video formats, Paramount Home Entertainment also released Never Say Never Weekend (#NSNweekend) using Bieber's official Facebook and Twitter accounts to seed party favors leading up to the release date of Never Say Never on DVD and Blu-ray.

== Sequel ==
Rumors of a sequel to Never Say Never began surfacing the media around May 2012, when Bieber himself hinted a possible sequel for some time. It wasn't until January 2013 when the project was confirmed by Bieber himself tweeting about it. Concert footage was filmed during Justin's Believe Tour on January 26–27, 2013 at Miami's American Airlines Arena. Two months later, in March 2013, a $15 million budget was appointed for the production of the sequel. On October 11, 2013, it was confirmed that Jon M. Chu reprised his role as director for the biopic and will be screened in 3D at the Toronto International Film Festival later in the month. Meanwhile, Justin Bieber released a teaser trailer on his kidrauhl YouTube channel for the sequel to Never Say Never with the tagline "There's more to his story" and the hashtag #BelieveMovie confirming the sequel title as "Believe", to be released on Christmas Day in 3D. The official trailer was released on Yahoo! Movies on November 15, 2013. The day after the trailer was released, director Jon Chu posted a photo on his Instagram account, noting on the caption that Believe would not be released in 3D as the teaser trailer and rumors previously suggested. The film's premiere was held in Los Angeles, California on December 18, 2013.

== Parody ==
Popstar: Never Stop Never Stopping (2016) is seen as a parody of music documentaries such as Never Say Never. It features Martin Sheen, Adam Levine, Mariah Carey, Snoop Dogg, Usher, Seal, Pink, "Weird Al" Yankovic, Ringo Starr and Justin Timberlake, among others.

== See also ==
- List of highest-grossing concert films
- Justin Bieber: Seasons (2020)
