= Change Me (Justin Bieber song) =

Single by Justin Bieber

from the album Journals
- Released: December 2, 2013
- Genre: R&B
- Length: 2:47
- Label: Island; RBMG; Schoolboy
- Songwriters: Justin Bieber; Andre Harris; Jason Boyd
- Producer: Harris

Justin Bieber singles chronology
"Roller Coaster" (2013)	"Change Me" (2013)	"Confident" (2013)

Audio video
- "Change Me" on YouTube

"Change Me" is a song by Canadian singer Justin Bieber from his second compilation album Journals (2013), released on December 2, 2013. The song is the ninth in Bieber's series Music Mondays, the first eight being "Heartbreaker" (October 7, 2013), "All That Matters" (October 14), "Hold Tight" (October 21), "Recovery" (October 28), "Bad Day" (November 4), "All Bad" (November 11), "PYD" (November 18) and "Roller Coaster" (November 25). Bieber released a new single every week for 10 weeks from October 7 to December 9, 2013.

== Track listing ==
Digital download
No.	Title	Length
1.	"Change Me"	2:47

== Chart performance ==
Chart (2013)	Peak position
Austria (Ö3 Austria Top 40)	45
Belgium (Ultratop 50 Flanders)	41
Belgium (Ultratop 50 Wallonia)	41
Canada Hot 100 (Billboard)	34
Denmark (Tracklisten)	2
France (SNEP)	84
Germany (GfK)	67
Ireland (IRMA)	33
Italy (Musica e Dischi)	38
Netherlands (Single Top 100)	23
Spain (Promusicae)	28
Switzerland (Schweizer Hitparade)	34
UK Singles (Official Charts)	39
US Billboard Hot 100	59
