= Phiiliip =

American musician

- Born: Philip Guichard; August 24, 1980 (age 45)
- Origin: New York City, New York, U.S.
- Genres: Computer rock
- Occupation: Music artisan
- Instrument: Wire
- Years active: 2000 – present
- Labels: American Patchwork, Escalator
- Website: Phiiliip.com

Phiiliip (born Philip Guichard, August 24, 1980) is an American performing artist, whose music has been described as "'Lady Godiva's Operation' remixed by the Neptunes on a budget."

== Life ==
His first album, Pet Cancer, was released on American Patchwork, Momus's label with Darla Records. AllMusic gave it four stars and said "Phiiliip combines soft synths, disaffected breathy vocals, and folky acoustic guitars for a dazzling, yet minimal effect." Momus was also responsible for redubbing Philip as Phiiliip, so as to ensure his googlability, and spearheaded a U.S. tour, of which Phiiliip's "highly postured and totally electronic act was reminiscent of a cross between retro Factory and Morrissey." He became a regular performer on the New York electroclash circuit, playing at clubs such as Luxx, Don Hill's, Joe's Pub, the Knitting Factory and the Andy Warhol Museum.

In 2002, he began compiling and mixing the CDs for annual arts magazine K48, which also featured his collaborations with nightlife celebrity Sophia Lamar. The same year saw Yesandno, his side-project with Captain Comatose's Snax, release their 12-inch Notahit on International DeeJay Gigolo Records, in addition to his collaboration with PFFR which appeared alongside Snoop Dogg on their album United We Doth. He later appeared on TRL for their MTV show Wonder Showzen. 2003 saw him performing for Dior Homme, and photographs of him by designer Hedi Slimane appeared on the cover of Butt Magazine.

In 2004, he had an art show with Deitch Projects and John Connelly Presents consisting of work from fifty artists "inspired by/responding to/commenting on/or utilizing the meat" of the CD he was then working on. Artists included Ryan McGinley, Terence Koh, AA Bronson, Dash Snow, Slava Mogutin and Assume Vivid Astro Focus. The show, "a decidedly off-kilter fun fair", according to Artforum, was chosen as one of the year's best in the New York Times. His CD Divided By Lightning, released in conjunction with the art show, featured collaborations with Soft Pink Truth, Excepter, Avenue D and Tigra of L'Trimm. The companion DVD, Multiplied By Thunder, featured a "pulsating geometric" video made by Bec Stupak for his reimagining of T. Rex's "Elemental Childe", and a version of his song "For The Second" sung by Boy George. 2005 saw remixes of Yukari Fresh and Grizzly Bear, in addition to "Pirateradiophiiliip", a DJ mix CD consisting of "mashups" he had made which fusing hip hop, R&B and pop with the underground electronic and club music of the time. 2007 also saw the belated release of "Totally Magic", his EP with now-defunct ex-roommates and electroclash boundary-stretchers Avenue D.

Later in 2007 the last Phiiliip album, Magically Bad was released for free (as all Philip Something's subsequent music would be) on his website. "Homefreeze", the single, also appeared on the prison-themed #6 issue of K48, the last to feature Phiiliip handling the mixing of the companion CD. The other single "Open Sun" also became a flower-entranced video by Grant Worth, the NY-based visual magician who also made the video for "Summer Collection" which became the cover of Divided By Lightning.

In 2008 Phiiliip notice a disturbance in the reigning culture succinctly embodied by the media's viciously invasive treatment of Britney Spears, and so he began deconstructing her crumbling image in the brutally harsh manner utilized by the toxic paparazzi culture, using as its source material all hyper-microscopic samples found on YouTube. Searching for "methamphetamine" led to the unrepentant stimulant anthem "Addicted To Ooh", and after several months of sourcing he had genetically databased the darker skeleton of culture and began elucidating its hidden errors through intensive electronic manipulation of randomly encountered details. It resulted in an album, Dignity, The Joke, which he released as Total BS on Vice's website in conjunction with an interview in the magazine about the symptoms of schizophrenia he was experiencing at the time, concomitantly with Britney and her breakdown.

In 2009, he recorded a double CD, Easily Scared (as Total PX) to serve as the soundtrack for Harmony Korine's art show "Pigxote". He also did an archive-raiding ultimix of Sweet Thunder for a split 7 inch with Gavin Russom and performed at their reunion in Brooklyn with Omega Jarden.

2010 saw Phiiliip recording folk cover albums as Jenkins (a tactless uncensored Phiiliip parody character off-the-books credited to Hunter Parrish). "Acoustic Tomb", "Castle of Pi", "Artery Clocka", "Zac Efron's Vegetable Gravy" and "Hexed In Heliotrope" were posted on Facebook and then disappeared (along with the personality, which was fairly antagonistic) on a dead laptop.

2012 saw Phiiliip return, this time as Wirekid. Like "Dignity, The Joke", consisting solely of source material found on YouTube, Wirekid's music began combining fiction, non-fiction, documentary, biography, criticism, secret history, gossip, poetry and jokes. Focusing on alternate realities experienced in dreams with fantasy versions of pop and movie stars, primarily centered around the Disney empire and the emerging teen pop echelon. Releasing his new music as a series of albums, singles and DJ mixes on SoundCloud and Bandcamp, he attempted to incorporate the celebrities he kept encountering at night and attempting to come to grips with and normalize by day online. The primary subject of his new composition/productions was Zac Efron, who was documented in "Here's To Your Health" from "The Sixth Floor,' the "Paragons Of Capitalism/Dying To Layla" single, "zAC eFRON hOUSE pARTY" album, and the presently unreleasable rock opera "Pistolwhipped By A Pigeon". Likewise praised actor James Franco provided the source material for "You Are Mistaken" an album detailing an alternate existence of unimaginable horrors (and implied eventual triumph) involving the CIA, mind control, experimental drug injection, ritualistic sadism and the infinite extremes of sexual abuse perpetrated against specially targeted individuals. While strictly theoretical and based on Philip fleshing out ideas related in Facebook instant messaging sessions, "Y.A.M." closely parallels account given by survivors of Project Monarch as found on the Internet. The conceptual extremes of this speculative reality were confronted via lyrical battling/deriding with the first Wirekid single "The Pain of Life", followed by the much lighter "I Don't Care" which returned to directly addressing James Franco, who was also the recipient of several free fan-art-projection-aspiring DJ mixes in his honor, including "Pattern Disruptor" (as Fed Zeppelin) and "You Don't Understand The Flow", which would later be sourced for "iLLuuMiiNatI a$$" (a collection of remixes for the rap and pop stars who populated Philip's dreams, and whose singles sometimes drew connections to the aforementioned speculatory existence). The most widely reworked artist Wirekid tackled was/is Justin Bieber, from whose catalog Wirekid reenvisioned "Lolly", "U Smile", "Die In Your Arms", "Baby", "Boyfriend", "All That Matters", "Hold Tight", "PYD", "What's Hatnin'" "Swap It Out", "Roller Coaster", "All Bad", "Memphis", Heartbreaker", "Recovery", "She Don't Like The Lights", "Backpack", "Memphis", and the unverifieds "Together Forever" and "Future". In 2014 he will begin work on 'Fantastic Nation,' an album of original material with a slated release date of 2014.

== Discography ==
=== Albums ===
- Pet Cancer (2001)
- Divided by Lightning (2005)
- Pirate Radio Phiiliip (2006)
- Totally Magic (2007)
- Magically Bad (2007)
- Dignity, the Joke (2008)
- Easily Scared (2009)
- Acoustic Tomb (2010)
- Castle of Pi (2010)
- Artery Clocka (2010)
- Zac Efron's Vegetable Gravy (2010)
- Hexed in Heliotrope (2010)
- The Sixth Floor (2013)
- Pattern Disruptor (2013)
- Zac Efron's House Party (2013)
- You Are Mistaken, (2013)
- Pistol Whipped by a Pigeon (2013)
- TrEaaatsZ (2013)
- iLLuuMiiNatI a$$ (2013)
- Breathe (2014)

=== Singles ===
- "Notahit" (2003)
- "Sweet Thunder" (2009)
- "The Pain of Life" (2013)
- "I Don't Care" (2013)
- "Paragons of Capitalism" / "Dying to Layla" (2013)
- "NSA" / "Life" (2013)
- "Drizzle Upside Down" (2013)

=== DVDs ===
- Multiplied by Thunder (2005)
