= List of number-one hits of 2013 (Denmark) =

Tracklisten is a chart that ranks the best-performing singles and tracks of the Denmark. Its data, published by IFPI Denmark and compiled by Nielsen Music Control, is based collectively on each single's weekly digital sales.

== Chart history ==
| Issue date | Song | Artist(s) | Ref. |
|---|---|---|---|
| 11 January | "Gangnam Style" | Psy | |
| 18 January | "Scream & Shout" | will.i.am featuring Britney Spears | |
| 25 January | "Suit & Tie" | Justin Timberlake featuring Jay-Z | |
| 1 February | "Thrift Shop" | Macklemore and Ryan Lewis featuring Wanz | |
| 8 February | "United" | Nik & Jay featuring Lisa Rowe | |
| 15 February | "Thrift Shop" | Macklemore and Ryan Lewis featuring Wanz | |
| 22 February | "One Way or Another (Teenage Kicks)" | One Direction | |
| 1 March | "Stay" | Rihanna featuring Mikky Ekko | |
| 8 March | "Thrift Shop" | Macklemore and Ryan Lewis featuring Wanz | |
| 15 March | "Gå med dig" | Nephew featuring Marie Key | |
| 22 March | "Din for evigt" | Burhan G | |
| 29 March | "Let Her Go" | Passenger | |
| 5 April | "Børn af natten" | Panamah | |
| 12 April | "Let Her Go" | Passenger | |
| 19 April | "Let Her Go" | Passenger | |
| 26 April | "Get Lucky" | Daft Punk featuring Pharrell Williams | |
| 3 May | "Get Lucky" | Daft Punk featuring Pharrell Williams | |
| 10 May | "Get Lucky" | Daft Punk featuring Pharrell Williams | |
| 17 May | "Get Lucky" | Daft Punk featuring Pharrell Williams | |
| 24 May | "Only Teardrops" | Emmelie de Forest | |
| 31 May | "Only Teardrops" | Emmelie de Forest | |
| 7 June | "Get Lucky" | Daft Punk featuring Pharrell Williams | |
| 14 June | "Get Lucky" | Daft Punk featuring Pharrell Williams | |
| 21 June | "Get Lucky" | Daft Punk featuring Pharrell Williams | |
| 28 June | "Wake Me Up!" | Avicii | |
| 5 July | "Wake Me Up!" | Avicii | |
| 12 July | "Wake Me Up!" | Avicii | |
| 19 July | "Wake Me Up!" | Avicii | |
| 26 July | "Wake Me Up!" | Avicii | |
| 2 August | "Wake Me Up!" | Avicii | |
| 9 August | "Wake Me Up!" | Avicii | |
| 16 August | "Wake Me Up!" | Avicii | |
| 23 August | "Wake Me Up!" | Avicii | |
| 30 August | "Kalder mig hjem" | Burhan G | |
| 6 September | "Kalder mig hjem" | Burhan G | |
| 13 September | "Dimitto (Let Go)" | Kato & Safri Duo featuring Bjørnskov | |
| 20 September | "Olivia" | Rasmus Seebach | |
| 27 September | "Olivia" | Rasmus Seebach | |
| 4 October | "Olivia" | Rasmus Seebach | |
| 11 October | "Olivia" | Rasmus Seebach | |
| 18 October | "Heartbreaker" | Justin Bieber | |
| 25 October | "All That Matters" | Justin Bieber | |
| 1 November | "Hold Tight" | Justin Bieber | |
| 8 November | "Story of My Life" | One Direction | |
| 15 November | "Bad day" | Justin Bieber | |
| 22 November | "Sandstorm" | Rasmus Seebach | |
| 29 November | "Diana" | One Direction | |
| 6 December | "Roller Coaster" | Justin Bieber | |
| 13 December | "I en stjerneregn af sne" | Mads Langer | |
| 20 December | "Confident" | Justin Bieber featuring Chance The Rapper | |
| 27 December | "I en stjerneregn af sne" | Mads Langer | |

== See also ==
- List of number-one albums from the 2010s (Denmark)
- 2013 in music
