= Roller Coaster (Justin Bieber song) =

Single by Justin Bieber

from the album Journals
- Released: November 25, 2013
- Recorded: February 26, 2013
- Studio: The Langham Hotel (London, United Kingdom)
- Length: 3:21
- Label: Island; RBMG; Schoolboy
- Songwriters: Justin Bieber; Rodney Jerkins; Julian Swirsky; Joshua Gudwin
- Producers: Darkchild; Julkeyz

Justin Bieber singles chronology
"PYD" (2013)	"Roller Coaster" (2013)	"Change Me" (2013)

Audio video
- "Roller Coaster" on YouTube

"Roller Coaster" is a single by Canadian singer Justin Bieber. Released on November 25, 2013, the song is the eighth in Bieber's series Music Mondays, the first seven being "Heartbreaker" (October 7, 2013), "All That Matters" (October 14), "Hold Tight" (October 21), "Recovery" (October 28), "Bad Day" (November 4), "All Bad" (November 11) and "PYD" (November 18). Bieber released a new single every week for 10 weeks from October 7 to December 9, 2013. The Swedish Jazz Fusion band, Dirty Loops, covered the song on their album Loopified

== Track listing ==
Digital download
No.	Title	Length
1.	"Roller Coaster"	3:21

== Chart performance ==
Chart (2013)	Peak position
Austria (Ö3 Austria Top 40)	40
Belgium (Ultratop 50 Flanders)	35
Belgium Urban (Ultratop Flanders)	9
Belgium (Ultratop 50 Wallonia)	29
Canada (Canadian Hot 100)	24
Denmark (Tracklisten)	1
France (SNEP)	70
Germany (GfK)	69
Ireland (IRMA)	31
Netherlands (Single Top 100)	22
Spain (PROMUSICAE)	23
Switzerland (Schweizer Hitparade)	30
UK Singles (OCC)	37
US Billboard Hot 100	47
