= PYD (song) =

Single by Justin Bieber featuring R. Kelly

from the album Journals
- Released: November 18, 2013
- Recorded: July 30, 2013
- Studio: Daddy's House Recording Studios (New York City)
- Genre: R&B
- Length: 5:17
- Label: Island; RBMG; Schoolboy
- Songwriters: Justin Bieber; Robert Kelly; Sasha Sirota; Dominic Jordan; Jimmy Giannos; Jason Boyd; Jamal Rashid
- Producers: Sirota; The Audibles

Justin Bieber singles chronology
"All Bad" (2013)	"PYD" (2013)	"Roller Coaster" (2013)

R. Kelly singles chronology
"Do What U Want" (2013)	"PYD" (2013)	"It's Your World" (2014)

Lyric video
- "PYD" on YouTube

"PYD" ("Put You Down") is a single by Canadian singer Justin Bieber, featuring vocals from American singer R. Kelly. It was released on November 18, 2013. The song is the seventh in Bieber's series Music Mondays, the first six being "Heartbreaker" (October 7, 2013), "All That Matters" (October 14), "Hold Tight" (October 21), "Recovery" (October 28), "Bad Day" (November 4), and "All Bad" (November 11). Bieber released a new single every week for 10 weeks from October 7 to December 9, 2013.

== Track listing ==
Digital download
No.	Title	Length
1.	"PYD" (featuring R. Kelly)	5:17

== Charts ==
Chart (2013–14)	Peak position
Austria (Ö3 Austria Top 40)	49
Belgium (Ultratop 50 Flanders)	24
Belgium Urban (Ultratop Flanders)	6
Belgium (Ultratop 50 Wallonia)	34
Canada Hot 100 (Billboard)	32
Denmark (Tracklisten)	4
France (SNEP)	62
Germany (GfK)	64
Ireland (IRMA)	29
Italy (Musica e Dischi)	24
Mexico (Billboard Mexican Airplay)	13
Netherlands (Single Top 100)	19
Spain (Promusicae)	26
Switzerland (Schweizer Hitparade)	27
UK Singles (Official Charts)	30
UK Hip Hop/R&B (Official Charts)	3
US Billboard Hot 100	54
US Hot R&B/Hip-Hop Songs (Billboard)	13
