= All Bad =

Single by Justin Bieber

from the album Journals
- Released: November 11, 2013
- Recorded: July 24, 2013
- Studio: Metalworks Studios (Ontario, Canada)
- Length: 3:02
- Label: Island; RBMG; Schoolboy
- Songwriters: Justin Bieber; Andre Harris; Jason Boyd; Ryan Toby
- Producer: Harris

Justin Bieber singles chronology
"Bad Day" (2013)	"All Bad" (2013)	"PYD" (2013)

Lyric video
- "All Bad" on YouTube

Professional ratings
Review scores
Source	Rating
PopCrush	3.5/5 stars

"All Bad" is a single by Canadian singer Justin Bieber. It was released on November 11, 2013. The song is the sixth in Bieber's series Music Mondays, the first five being "Heartbreaker" (October 7, 2013), "All That Matters" (October 14), "Hold Tight" (October 21), "Recovery" (October 28) and "Bad Day" (November 4). Bieber released a new single every week for 10 weeks from October 7 to December 9, 2013.

== Track listings ==
Digital download
No.	Title	Length
1.	"All Bad"	3:02

== Charts ==
Chart (2013)	Peak position
Austria (Ö3 Austria Top 40)	45
Belgium (Ultratop 50 Flanders)	23
Belgium Urban (Ultratop Flanders)	6
Belgium (Ultratop 50 Wallonia)	29
Canada Hot 100 (Billboard)	26
Denmark (Tracklisten)	2
France (SNEP)	55
Germany (GfK)	61
Ireland (IRMA)	24
Italy (Musica e Dischi)	42
Netherlands (Single Top 100)	14
Spain (Promusicae)	22
UK Singles (Official Charts)	34
US Billboard Hot 100	50
