= Bad Day (Justin Bieber song) =

Single by Justin Bieber

from the album Journals
- Released: November 4, 2013
- Length: 2:25
- Label: Island; RBMG; Schoolboy
- Songwriters: Justin Bieber; Dominic Jordan; Jimmy Giannos; Jason Boyd; Jamal Rashid; Ernest Isley; Marvin Isley; O'Kelly Isley Jr.; Ronald Isley; Rudolph Isley; Christopher Jasper
- Producer: The Audibles

Justin Bieber singles chronology
"Recovery" (2013)	"Bad Day" (2013)	"All Bad" (2013)

Audio video
- "Bad Day" on YouTube

"Bad Day" is a song by Canadian singer Justin Bieber, which appears on his second compilation album Journals (2013). It was released on November 4, 2013. The song is the fifth in Bieber's series Music Mondays, the first four being "Heartbreaker" (October 7), "All That Matters" (October 14), "Hold Tight" (October 21), and "Recovery" (October 28). Bieber released a new single every week for 10 weeks from October 7 to December 9, 2013.

The song samples the Isley Brothers song "Footsteps in the Dark", the same song sampled for the Ice Cube song "It Was a Good Day".

== Track listing ==
Digital download
No.	Title	Length
1.	"Bad Day"	2:25

== Charts ==
Chart (2013–14)	Peak position
Austria (Ö3 Austria Top 40)	41
Belgium (Ultratop 50 Flanders)	19
Belgium Urban (Ultratop Flanders)	4
Belgium (Ultratop 50 Wallonia)	26
Canada Hot 100 (Billboard)	26
Denmark (Tracklisten)	1
France (SNEP)	54
Germany (GfK)	66
Ireland (IRMA)	25
Mexico (Billboard Mexican Airplay)	17
Netherlands (Single Top 100)	16
Spain (Promusicae)	25
Switzerland (Schweizer Hitparade)	28
UK Singles (Official Charts)	31
US Billboard Hot 100	53
US Hot R&B/Hip-Hop Songs (Billboard)	17
