= Confident (Justin Bieber song) =

Single by Justin Bieber featuring Chance the Rapper

from the album Journals
- Released: December 9, 2013
- Recorded: August–September 2013
- Genre: Pop; hip hop; reggae; R&B
- Length: 4:10
- Label: Island; RBMG; Schoolboy
- Songwriters: Justin Bieber; Chancelor Bennett; Kenneth Coby; Maurice Simmonds
- Producer: Soundz

Justin Bieber singles chronology
"Change Me" (2013)	"Confident" (2013)	"We Were Born for This" (2014)

Chance the Rapper singles chronology
"Life Round Here" (2013)	"Confident" (2013)	"Sunday Candy" (2014)

Music video
- "Confident" on YouTube

"Confident" is a song by Canadian singer Justin Bieber, featuring vocals from American rapper Chance the Rapper. The song is taken from Bieber's second compilation Journals (2013). Written by Bieber in addition to Kenneth Coby, Maurice "Verse" Simmonds, Chancellor Bennett and produced by Soundz, "Confident" was released as a single on December 9, 2013, by Island Records, as the tenth and last song from a ten-week digital download campaign entitled Music Mondays, in which one new song was released every Monday night, held from October 7, 2013, to December 9, 2013.

"Confident" received positive feedback from music critics, who praised its catchiness and deemed it a highlight from the album. Commercially, it debuted and peaked at number 41 but only stayed on the chart for one week in the United States, and while it reached the top 40 in Canada, it only spent two weeks on the chart. Internationally, it peaked at numbers eight and one in Belgium and Denmark, respectively. The accompanying music video for "Confident", directed by Colin Tilley, depicts Bieber stalking his confident love interest until they share a kiss in its end.

== Background ==
On October 3, 2013, Bieber announced that he would release one new song every Monday for ten weeks in a campaign entitled Music Mondays, leading up to the release of his Justin Bieber's Believe theatrical film, which will see a limited one-week release on Christmas Day 2013. The first song released by Bieber was "Heartbreaker", on October 7, 2013, while the last, "Confident" was released on December 9. The same day, Bieber announced that the ten Music Monday releases would be packaged with an additional five new songs in a compilation entitled Complete My Journals. Although the album was initially set for release on December 16, 2013, the date was pushed back one week to December 23, as Bieber intended to include one more song on the compilation. Though it does not appear on the album itself, the bonus track, "Flatline," is available for a free download on the iTunes Store. Journals would be available on iTunes until January 2, 2014, and all sixteen songs will be available for purchase individually thereafter.

== Composition ==
"Confident" is a song composed by hip-hop and reggae elements which features American recording artist Chance the Rapper. Lyrically, it is different from his previous Music Mondays releases and focuses on a new love interest, singing "She's confident/Oh no no, oh no no/And I'm down with it". Later, Chance the Rapper raps about twerk education and playing the comedic counterpart to Bieber's straight-faced heartthrob. According to Ben Rayner from Toronto Star, the song was a "sexual momentum" on the album.

== Critical reception ==
The song was well received by music critics for its production and catchiness. Jason Lipshutz from Billboard deemed "Confident" as the strongest track from Music Mondays. Glenn Gamboa from Newsday also complimented the track, saying it showed the singer moving into "hip-hop with a catchy, memorable groove and first-rate help from Chance the Rapper. It's a sign that Bieber will move through his current struggles into even greater success". Alex Griffin from website Mad Good Music shared a similar comment, stating the song "wouldn't sound out of place on a Justin Timberlake album and has the pair discussing how they're transfixed with the most confident girl in the room, with a typically hyper Chance verse, laden with his screeching adlibs".

== Music video ==
An accompanying music video for the song was filmed on December 18, 2013, by director Colin Tilley. It was released on January 29, 2014. He had previously posted two photos from its shooting through Instagram in December. In the video, Bieber tries to seduce a young woman, played by Cailin Russo, in a gas station but he missteps with an ineffective pun-based pickup line. Although he definitely piques her interest, she says he has to "try harder than that" to get her. Bieber spends most of video following her around and singing and dancing about how into her he is. A group of dancers is also shown dancing with Bieber. During its end, Bieber startles Russo and spins her around; everything becomes steamier between the two as Russo licks her lips. After that, the singer surprises his love interest with a sensual kiss; he then asks her, "Can I have your number now?" before they share another steamy kiss at the end while her love interest is shown leaning on the Jeep Wrangler.

The video received positive reviews. Emily Longeretta from Hollywood Life commented, "We knew Justin was smooth, but he took things to a whole new level this time!" Spin's Chris Martins stated the video was fun. Writer Ton Breihan from Stereogum noted that it was paying homage to Michael Jackson's "The Way You Make Me Feel" music video (1987).

== Live performance ==
On April 13, 2014, Chance the Rapper brought out Bieber during his performance at the Coachella Valley Music and Arts Festival, where they performed "Confident."

== Track listing ==
Digital download
No.	Title	Length
1.	"Confident" (featuring Chance the Rapper)	4:08

== Charts ==
=== Weekly charts ===
2013–2014 weekly chart performance for "Confident"
Chart (2013–2014)	Peak position
Australia (ARIA)	53
Austria (Ö3 Austria Top 40)	48
Belgium (Ultratop 50 Flanders)	34
Belgium (Ultratop Flanders Urban)	8
Belgium (Ultratop 50 Wallonia)	34
Canada Hot 100 (Billboard)	29
Denmark (Tracklisten)	1
France (SNEP)	88
Germany (GfK)	61
Ireland (IRMA)	29
Netherlands (Single Top 100)	23
Scottish Singles Sales (Official Charts)	57
Spain (Promusicae)	30
Switzerland (Schweizer Hitparade)	37
UK Singles (Official Charts)	33
UK Hip Hop/R&B (Official Charts)	4
US Billboard Hot 100	41
US Hot R&B/Hip-Hop Songs (Billboard)	13

2026 weekly chart performance for "Confident"
Chart (2026)	Peak position
France (SNEP)	153
Global 200 (Billboard)	18
Greece International (IFPI)	8
Lithuania (AGATA)	67
Malaysia (Billboard)	14
Malaysia International (RIM)	16
Norway (IFPI Norge)	51
Philippines Hot 100 (Billboard Philippines)	25
Portugal (AFP)	40
Romania (Billboard)	19
Singapore (RIAS)	27
Slovakia Singles Digital (ČNS IFPI)	51
Sweden (Sverigetopplistan)	49
Taiwan (Billboard)	23
US Hot R&B/Hip-Hop Songs (Billboard)	9

=== Year-end charts ===
Year-end chart performance for "Confident"
Chart (2014)	Position
US Hot R&B/Hip-Hop Songs (Billboard)	85

== Certifications ==
Certifications for "Confident"
Region	Certification	Certified units/sales
Australia (ARIA)	Platinum	70,000^{‡}
Brazil (Pro-Música Brasil)	Diamond	250,000^{‡}
Denmark (IFPI Danmark)	Platinum	90,000^{‡}
New Zealand (RMNZ)	3× Platinum	90,000^{‡}
Poland (ZPAV)	Platinum	50,000^{‡}
Spain (Promusicae)	Gold	50,000^{‡}
United Kingdom (BPI)	Platinum	600,000^{‡}
United States (RIAA)	Platinum	1,000,000^{‡}
Streaming
Greece (IFPI Greece)	Platinum	2,000,000^{†}
^{‡} Sales+streaming figures based on certification alone.^{†} Streaming-only figures based on certification alone.
