= Poo Bear =

American singer and songwriter

- Also known as: MDMA
- Born: Jason Paul Douglas Boyd; New Haven, Connecticut, U.S.
- Origin: Las Vegas, Nevada, U.S.
- Genres: Pop; R&B
- Occupations: Singer; songwriter; record producer
- Years active: 1997–present
- Labels: Bearthday; Capitol
- Website: poobearmusic.com

Jason Paul Douglas Boyd, known professionally as Poo Bear, is an American singer, songwriter, and record producer. He is best known for his songwriting work for Canadian singer Justin Bieber, having been credited on each of his albums since his debut compilation album, Journals (2013). Boyd has written four Billboard Hot 100-number one singles with Bieber's performances on his remix of Luis Fonsi and Daddy Yankee's "Despacito" and his collaboration with DJ Khaled, "I'm the One", alongside his singles "Where Are Ü Now" and "What Do You Mean?". Furthermore, Boyd has written Bieber's top 40 singles "Intentions", "Forever", "I Don't Care", and "All That Matters".

Prior, Boyd was credited on albums for R&B group 112, and co-wrote Usher's 2004 single "Caught Up", which peaked within the chart's top ten. He often writes for Scott Storch productions and co-writes in tandem with Sasha Sirota. He has also worked with artists such as Lil Wayne, Mariah Carey, Chris Brown, Ariana Grande, Pitbull, Sam Smith, David Guetta, Wiz Khalifa, Jennifer Lopez, 21 Savage, Ludacris, Foxy Brown, Skrillex, Ed Sheeran, Billie Eilish, Summer Walker, Future, Trey Songz, Travis Scott, Nas, Timbaland, Post Malone, Rick Ross, Bryson Tiller, Twista, Amerie, Zac Brown Band, and Fifth Harmony, alongside members of Destiny's Child, Wu-Tang Clan, and Migos.

As a recording artist, Boyd signed with Capitol Records to release his debut studio album, Poo Bear Presents Bearthday Music (2018). Its lead single, "Hard 2 Face Reality" (featuring Justin Bieber and Jay Electronica), entered the Bubbling Under Hot 100 chart, as well as several international charts. His second studio album, The Book of Nabeel (2022), was self-released. As MDMA, he guest performed on Lupe Fiasco's "I Don't Wanna Care Right Now" and Trae tha Truth's "I'm On". Outside of recording music, he created the distribution platform Fwaygo in 2023.

== Early life ==
Jason Paul Douglas Boyd was born in New Haven, Connecticut. His parents separated when he was 8 years-old. He moved with his mother to Atlanta, Georgia, at age 9 after a tornado left them homeless. He described his father as being very religious who did not permit Boyd to listen to non-secular music. Boyd has described listening to Stevie Wonder in secret when he was 7 or 8 years old. He described that at age 11 when he starting seriously pursuing music, and signed his first record deal at 12 years old. His first career breakthrough came at the age of 16 years old, when he started working with R&B group 112 and wrote the song, "Anywhere". He later co-wrote the songs "Dance with Me" and "Peaches & Cream", the latter peaking at number 4 on the Billboard Hot 100. During high school, Boyd chose to keep his involvement in music activities completely private, disclosing it to no one, including friends and peers. This secrecy was intended to avoid potential jealousy or alterations in social treatment. In particular, he did not reveal that he had released a record in association with 112. Boyd wrote "Love Is Such a Crazy Thing," on Pink's first album.

== Career ==
=== 1999–present: As writer and producer ===
Following his early success with 112, Boyd continued to write with other artists, including Chris Brown, Jill Scott, and Mariah Carey. In 2004, Usher's album Confessions was released and contained the single "Caught Up", which Boyd co-wrote with Ryan Toby and producers Dre & Vidal. The album was certified diamond by the Recording Industry Association of America (RIAA), selling over 10 million copies in the US, and is largely considered as one of the best albums of the decade. "Caught Up" was the fifth single released from the album, peaking at number 8 on the Billboard Hot 100. He also worked with former Destiny's Child member Kelly Rowland, handling production on her comeback hit, "Work", which peaked within the top 10 of several music charts worldwide.

While in Las Vegas, Nevada, in January 2013, Boyd was introduced to Justin Bieber through rapper Lil Twist and other friends of Bieber's. The two bonded over similar upbringings and tastes in music and traveled the world together while working on music for Bieber's album. During this time, Boyd eschewed working with other artists, devoting his time exclusively to Bieber. He co-wrote the majority of the songs on Bieber's compilation album Journals (2013) and his fourth studio album Purpose (2015), including "No Pressure", where he is also credited as producer, "PYD" (featuring R. Kelly), "All That Matters", and the double-platinum selling singles "Where Are Ü Now" (with Diplo and Skrillex's Jack Ü), which peaked at number 8 on the Billboard Hot 100, and "What Do You Mean?", which topped the Hot 100.

In the latter part of the 2010s, Boyd's work found success in both the Latin and country music genres. "Despacito (Remix)" was named the number 1 Latin song in the history of the Billboard charts, and Dan + Shay's hit "10,000 Hours" reached number 1 on the Billboard Hot Country Songs chart. In addition, Boyd produced the songs "Mañana es Too Late" and "Lo Nuestro es Más", by Mexican pop duo Jesse & Joy, with the first one being a collaboration with Colombian reggaeton singer J Balvin. His most recent work as a producer alone was the Jesse & Joy tracks "Aires" and "¿En Què Nos Convertimos?", from their fifth studio album Aire (Versión Día) (2020), with his most recent as both a writer and producer being "Star Signs", the eleventh track from Bryson Tiller's fourth studio album, Solace & The Vices (2025), specifically on its first disc, simply named Solace.

=== 2004–2022: As performer ===
==== 2004–2021: As featured artist ====
Poo Bear was first credited as a performing artist on 8Ball & MJG's "Confessions", from their sixth studio album Living Legends (2004). One year later, in 2005, he appeared on the track "My Chrome" from the Purple Ribbon All-Stars' sole studio album Got Purp? Vol. 2. The group featured artists such as Big Boi of Outkast, Killer Mike of Run the Jewels, Janelle Monáe, Sleepy Brown, Bubba Sparxxx, and Fonzworth Bentley, alongside others. In 2006, he appeared on the Yo Gotti track "That's What They Made It Foe", off of his fifth studio album, Back 2 da Basics. In 2007, he reunited with 8Ball & MJG for the track "Take It Off", off of their seventh studio album, Ridin High. In 2008, he collaborated with Fat Joe on two tracks from his eighth studio album, The Elephant in the Room, "Get It for Life" and "Preacher on a Sunday Morning".

In 2009, he featured on two tracks from Wu-Tang Clan members Method Man & Redman's second studio album, Blackout! 2, "Hey Zulu" and "I Know Sumptin'". A year later, he would collaborate with Redman again, this time on his seventh studio album Reggie (2010), appearing on the track "When the Lights Go Off". In 2012, he appeared on two tracks from Lupe Fiasco's fourth studio album, Food & Liquor II: The Great American Rap Album Pt. 1, "Heart Donor" and "How Dare You". In 2015, he appeared on King Los' debut studio album, God, Money, War, specifically on the album's sole interlude, "Black and White (Interlude)". In 2017, he appeared on the Galantis track "Salvage (Up All Night)", from their second studio album, The Aviary.

In 2021, he appeared on Justin Bieber's "Angels Speak", from the "Complete Edition" of his sixth studio album, Justice. Upon its release, the track peaked at number 39 on the Official Aotearoa Music Charts in New Zealand. That same year, on the 19th of November, he featured alongside Bieber on Bryson Tiller's debut extended play (EP), A Different Christmas, specifically on the track "Lonely Christmas", released as the EP's sole single in Italy and on the same day as the EP itself. Upon its release, the single peaked at number 13 on the Sverigetopplistan's Swedish Heatseeker chart. Poo Bear had previously appeared on Bieber's 2020 YouTube docu-series, Justin Bieber: Seasons, mainly on the series' third episode, "Making Magic", released on the 27th of January, 2020, alongside three other episodes.

==== 2017–2022: As lead artist ====
Poo Bear's debut single as a lead artist was "Would You Ever" with Skrillex, released on the 26th of July, 2017. Upon its release, the single charted at number 24 on the Billboard Bubbling Under Hot 100 chart in the United States of America, where it was certified Gold by the Recording Industry Association of America (RIAA) for equivalent sales of 500,000 units. The song would eventually peak at number 3 on the Ultratip Bubbling Under chart in Flanders, Belgium, and number 2 on Recorded Music New Zealand's New Zealand Heatseekers chart. It also charted in Australia, Canada, the Czech Republic, Ireland, Portugal, Scotland, Slovakia, Sweden, Switzerland, and the United Kingdom. He was also certified 2× Platinum in Australia, Platinum in New Zealand, Gold in Canada, and Silver in the United Kingdom.

That same year, Poo Bear released the lead single to his then-upcoming debut studio album, "When I See You" (featuring Anitta), which topped both the Brazil Hot Pop & Popular and Regional Rio de Janeiro Hot Songs charts. The album's second single was "All We Can Do" (with Juanes), released on the 17th of November, 2017. "Hard 2 Face Reality" (featuring Justin Bieber and Jay Electronica), was released as the third single on the 6th of April, 2018. Upon its release, it charted at number 6 on the Billboard Bubbling Under Hot 100 chart in the United States and peaked at number 5 on the New Zealand Heatseekers chart. It also charted in Austria, Canada, the Czech Republic, Denmark, the Netherlands, Norway, Slovakia, Sweden, and Switzerland. The song was also certified 2× Platinum in Brazil, despite not charting in the country, and Gold in Denmark and New Zealand.

Poo Bear Presents Bearthday Music was released as Poo Bear's debut studio album on the 27th of April, 2018, through Capitol Records and Universal Records. The album features production handled by Boi-1da, Illmind, Nineteen85, Skrillex, Soundz, and The Audibles, alongside guest appearances from Anitta, Bieber, Electronica, and Juanes, alongside Jennifer Lopez, J Balvin, Zara Larsson, and Ty Dolla Sign, alongside others. Balvin appears on the album's fourth and final single, "Perdido", released on the 20th of April, 2018. "Two Commas" and "Yes Please" would also be released as non-album singles in 2018. Poo Bear followed up Bearthday Music with his second studio album, The Book of Nabeel, released on the 18th of November, 2022, through NFartam Ltd.

==== 2011: As "MDMA" ====
Boyd occasionally goes under the "MDMA" name on some recordings. In 2011, he appeared under the name on three songs from Lupe Fiasco's third studio album, Lasers, including the single "I Don't Wanna Care Right Now", which charted in Australia, Canada, and the United States, peaking at number 12 on the latter's Billboard Bubbling Under Hot 100 chart, alongside the non-single songs "Beautiful Lasers (2 Ways)" and "Coming Up". That same year, he appeared alongside Fiasco, Big Boi of Outkast, Wale, and Wiz Khalifa on Trae tha Truth's single "I'm On", the second and final single to his sixth studio album Street King (2011).

== Personal life ==
Boyd moved to Hollywood in 2013. He married an R&B singer, Ashley Joi Sadler, in April 2016. The officiant to their wedding was Scott “Scooter” Braun.

== Discography ==
=== Studio albums ===
List of studio albums
| Title | Details |
|---|---|
| Poo Bear Presents Bearthday Music | Released: April 27, 2018; Label: Capitol, Universal; Format: CD, digital download |
| The Book of Nabeel | Released: November 18, 2022; Label: NFartam Ltd.; Format: Digital download |

=== Singles ===
==== As lead artist ====
List of singles as lead artist, with selected chart positions and certifications, showing year released and album name
| Title | Year | Peak chart positions | | | | | | | | | | Certifications | Album |
| Title | Year | US Bub. | AUS | AUT | BEL | FRA | GER | NLD | SWE | SWI | UK | Certifications | Album |
|---|---|---|---|---|---|---|---|---|---|---|---|---|---|
| "Would You Ever" (with Skrillex) | 2017 | 24 | 42 | — | 3 | — | — | — | 91 | 63 | 55 | ARIA: 2× Platinum; MC: Gold; RMNZ: Platinum; BPI: Silver; RIAA: Gold | Non-album single |
| "Will I See You" (featuring Anitta) | 2017 | — | — | — | — | — | — | — | — | — | — | | Poo Bear Presents Bearthday Music |
| "Hard 2 Face Reality" (featuring Justin Bieber and Jay Electronica) | 2018 | 6 | — | 71 | — | — | — | 70 | 59 | 88 | — | PMB: 2× Platinum; IFPI DEN: Gold; RMNZ: Gold | Poo Bear Presents Bearthday Music |
| "Perdido" (featuring J Balvin) | 2018 | — | — | — | — | — | — | — | — | — | — | | Poo Bear Presents Bearthday Music |
| "All We Can Do" (with Juanes) | 2018 | — | — | — | — | — | — | — | — | — | — | | Poo Bear Presents Bearthday Music |
| "Two Commas" | 2018 | — | — | — | — | — | — | — | — | — | — | | |
| "Yes Please" | 2018 | — | — | — | — | — | — | — | — | — | — | | |
"—" denotes a recording that did not chart or was not released in that territory.

==== As featured artist ====
List of singles as featured artist
| Title | Year | Album |
|---|---|---|
| "Lonely Christmas" (Bryson Tiller featuring Justin Bieber and Poo Bear) | 2021 | A Different Christmas |
| "Undisputed" (Sena Kana featuring Poo Bear) | 2022 | Serenity EP |

=== Other charted songs ===
List of songs, with selected chart positions, showing year released and album name
| Title | Year | Peak chart position | Album |
| Title | Year | NZ Hot | Album |
|---|---|---|---|
| "Angels Speak" (Justin Bieber featuring Poo Bear) | 2021 | 39 | Justice (The Complete Edition) |

=== Guest appearances ===
| Title | Year | Other artist | Album |
|---|---|---|---|
| "Salvage (Up All Night)" | 2017 | Galantis | The Aviary |
| "Angels Speak" | 2021 | Justin Bieber | Justice (The Complete Edition) |
| "Lonely Christmas" | 2021 | Bryson Tiller, Justin Bieber | A Different Christmas |

== Filmography ==
| Year | Title | Notes | Ref. |
|---|---|---|---|
| 2020 | Justin Bieber: Seasons | Himself | |

== Songwriting and production credits ==
| Year | Artist | Song | Album |
|---|---|---|---|
| 1999 | 112 | "Be with You" | Room 112 |
| 1999 | 112 | "Anywhere (Interlude)" | Room 112 |
| 2000 | Pink | "Love is Such a Crazy Thing" | Can't Take Me Home |
| 2001 | 112 | "Dance with Me" | Part III |
| 2001 | 112 | "Peaches & Cream" | Part III |
| 2001 | 112 | "All I Want is You" | Part III |
| 2001 | 112 | "Don't Hate Me" (featuring Twista) | Part III |
| 2001 | 112 | "Sweet Love" | Part III |
| 2002 | Howard Jones | "All I Want" | The Peaceful Tour Live |
| Lady May | "Round Up" (featuring Blu Cantrell) | May Day | |
| Isyss | "Single for the Rest of My Life" | The Way We Do | |
| 2003 | Glenn Lewis | "Back for More" (featuring Kardinal Offishall) | Non-album single |
| 2003 | 112 | "Knock U Down (Interlude)" | Hot & Wet |
| 2003 | 112 | "Knock U Down" | Hot & Wet |
| 2003 | 112 | "Give It to Me" | Hot & Wet |
| 2003 | Ruben Studdard | "After the Candles Burn" | Soulful |
| 2004 | Carl Thomas | "Work It Out" | Let's Talk About It |
| 2004 | Usher | "Caught Up" | Confessions |
| 2004 | Usher | "Superstar" | Confessions |
| 2004 | Usher | "Follow Me" | Confessions |
| 2004 | 8Ball & MJG | "Confessions" (featuring Poo Bear) | Living Legends |
| 2004 | Jill Scott | "My Petition" | Beautifully Human: Words and Sounds Vol. 2 |
| 2005 | R.A.C.L.A. | "2 in 1" | DEXteritate |
| 2005 | Amerie | "Just Like Me" | Touch |
| 2005 | Purple Ribbon All-Stars | "My Chrome" (featuring Poo Bear) | Got Purp? Vol. 2 |
| 2005 | Purple Ribbon All-Stars | "Lovin' This" | Got Purp? Vol. 2 |
| 2006 | Urban Mystic | "I Refuse" | Ghetto Revelations II |
| 2006 | Urban Mystic | "Your Portrait" | Ghetto Revelations II |
| 2006 | Yo Gotti | "That's What They Made It Foe" (featuring Poo Bear) | Back 2 da Basics |
| 2006 | Brooke Hogan | "About Us" (featuring Paul Wall) | Undiscovered |
| 2006 | Kelis | "Trilogy" | Kelis Was Here |
| 2006 | Kelis | "Handful" | Kelis Was Here |
| 2006 | Danity Kane | "Sleep on It" | Danity Kane |
| 2006 | Ruben Studdard | "What tha Business Is" | The Return |
| 2006 | Brooke Hogan | "My Space" | Undiscovered |
| 2006 | Brooke Hogan | "All About Me" | Undiscovered |
| 2006 | Brooke Hogan | "My Number" (featuring Stacks) | Undiscovered |
| 2006 | Brooke Hogan | "One Sided Love" | Undiscovered |
| 2006 | Brooke Hogan | "Dance Alone" (featuring Nox) | Undiscovered |
| 2007 | 8Ball & MJG | "Take It Off" (featuring Poo Bear) | Ridin High |
| 2007 | Mya | "Lock U Down" (featuring Lil Wayne) | Liberation |
| 2007 | Daddy Yankee | "Qué Pasó!" | El Cartel: The Big Boss |
| 2007 | Kelly Rowland | "Comeback" | Ms. Kelly |
| 2007 | Kelly Rowland | "Work" | Ms. Kelly |
| 2007 | Foxy Brown | "When the Lights Go Out" (featuring Kira) | Brooklyn's Don Diva |
| 2008 | Saint | "Dance with Me" feat. M.D.P. | Non-album single |
| 2008 | Fat Joe | "Get It for Life" (featuring Poo Bear) | The Elephant in the Room |
| 2008 | Fat Joe | "Preacher on a Sunday Morning" (featuring Poo Bear) | The Elephant in the Room |
| 2008 | Ludacris | "Contagious" (featuring Jamie Foxx) | Theater of the Mind |
| 2008 | Kindred the Family Soul | "No Limit" | The Arrival |
| 2008 | Common | "Make My Day" (featuring CeeLo Green) | Universal Mind Control |
| 2009 | Method Man & Redman | "Hey Zulu" (featuring Poo Bear) | Blackout! 2 |
| 2009 | Method Man & Redman | "I Know Sumptin'" (featuring Poo Bear) | Blackout! 2 |
| 2009 | Chris Brown | "I Can Transform Ya" (featuring Lil Wayne and Swizz Beatz) | Graffiti |
| 2009 | Chris Brown | "What I Do" (featuring Plies) | Graffiti |
| 2010 | Bone Thugs-n-Harmony | "Rebirth" | Uni5: The World's Enemy |
| 2010 | RichGirl | "Swagger Right" (featuring Fabolous and Rick Ross) | Non-album single |
| 2010 | Redman | "When the Lights Go Off" (featuring Poo Bear) | Reggie |
| 2011 | Lupe Fiasco | "I Don't Wanna Care Right Now" (featuring MDMA) | Lasers |
| 2011 | Lupe Fiasco | "Beautiful Lasers (2 Ways)" (featuring MDMA) | Lasers |
| 2011 | Lupe Fiasco | "Coming Up" (featuring MDMA) | Lasers |
| 2011 | Chris Brown | "She Ain't You" | F.A.M.E. |
| 2011 | Lloyd | "World Cry" (featuring R. Kelly, Keri Hilson and K'naan) | King of Hearts |
| 2011 | Yelawolf | "Let's Roll" (featuring Kid Rock) | Radioactive |
| 2012 | Lil Twist | "Contact" | Don't Get It Twisted |
| 2012 | Lupe Fiasco | "Bitch Bad" | Food & Liquor II: The Great American Rap Album Pt. 1 |
| 2012 | Slaughterhouse | "Place to Be" (featuring B.o.B) | Welcome to: Our House |
| 2012 | Lupe Fiasco | "Heart Donor" (featuring Poo Bear) | Food & Liquor II: The Great American Rap Album Pt. 1 |
| 2012 | Lupe Fiasco | "How Dare You" (featuring Bilal) | Food & Liquor II: The Great American Rap Album Pt. 1 |
| 2012 | Lupe Fiasco | "Brave Heart" (featuring Poo Bear) | Food & Liquor II: The Great American Rap Album Pt. 1 |
| 2012 | Lupe Fiasco | "Hood Now (Outro)" | Food & Liquor II: The Great American Rap Album Pt. 1 |
| 2013 | Jah Cure | "Nothing is Impossible" | World Cry |
| 2013 | Justin Bieber | "All That Matters" | Journals |
| 2013 | Justin Bieber | "Hold Tight" | Journals |
| 2013 | Justin Bieber | "Recovery" | Journals |
| 2013 | Justin Bieber | "Bad Day" | Journals |
| 2013 | Justin Bieber | "All Bad" | Journals |
| 2013 | Justin Bieber | "PYD" (featuring R. Kelly) | Journals |
| 2013 | Justin Bieber | "Change Me" | Journals |
| 2013 | Justin Bieber | "Swap It Out" | Journals |
| 2015 | Jack Ü | "Where Are Ü Now" (with Justin Bieber) | Skrillex and Diplo Present Jack Ü |
| 2015 | King Los | "Black and White (Interlude)" (featuring Poo Bear) | God, Money, War |
| 2015 | JR Castro | "Get Home" (featuring Kid Ink and Quavo) | Sexpectations, Vol. I |
| 2015 | Justin Bieber | "What Do You Mean?" (solo or with Ariana Grande) | Purpose |
| 2015 | Nico & Vinz | "Not for Nothing" | Cornerstone EP |
| 2015 | Abraham Mateo | "A Place in My Heart" | Are You Ready? |
| 2015 | Justin Bieber | "Mark My Words" | Purpose |
| 2015 | Justin Bieber | "Company" | Purpose |
| 2015 | Justin Bieber | "No Pressure" (featuring Big Sean) | Purpose |
| 2015 | Justin Bieber | "No Sense" (featuring Travis Scott) | Purpose |
| 2015 | Justin Bieber | "Life is Worth Living" | Purpose |
| 2015 | Justin Bieber | "Children" | Purpose |
| 2015 | Justin Bieber | "Purpose" | Purpose |
| 2015 | Justin Bieber | "Been You" | Purpose |
| 2015 | Justin Bieber | "Get Used to It" | Purpose |
| 2015 | Justin Bieber | "We Are" (featuring Nas) | Purpose |
| 2015 | Justin Bieber | "Trust" | Purpose |
| 2015 | Justin Bieber | "All In" | Purpose |
| 2015 | Justin Bieber | "Hit the Ground" | Purpose |
| 2015 | Justin Bieber | "The Most" | Purpose |
| 2015 | Chris Brown | "Little More (Royalty)" | Royalty |
| 2016 | JR Castro | "FMN" (featuring Timbaland) | Sexpectations, Vol. I |
| 2016 | J Balvin | "No Hay Titulo" | Energia |
| 2016 | Steven Tyler | "Hold On (Won't Let Go)" | We're All Somebody from Somewhere |
| 2017 | Big Sean | "Jump Out the Window" | I Decided |
| 2017 | Ashlund Jade | "Ultimatum" | Non-album single |
| 2017 | Pitbull | "Better on Me" (featuring Ty Dolla Sign) | Climate Change |
| 2017 | Trey Songz | "What Are We Here For" | Tremaine the Album |
| 2017 | Trey Songz | "Break from Love" | Tremaine the Album |
| 2017 | La'Porsha Renae | "What is Love" | Already All Ready |
| 2017 | Luis Fonsi | "Despacito (Remix)" (with Daddy Yankee featuring Justin Bieber) | Vida |
| 2017 | DJ Khaled | "I'm the One" (featuring Justin Bieber, Quavo, Chance the Rapper and Lil Wayne) | Grateful |
| 2017 | Wale | "Colombia Heights (Te Llamo)" (featuring J Balvin) | Shine |
| 2017 | Juanes | "Goodbye for Now" | Mis planes son amarte |
| 2017 | Jack & Jack | "Last Thing" | Gone EP |
| 2017 | Mali | "I Will" | The Transition of Mali |
| 2017 | David Guetta | "2U" (featuring Justin Bieber) | 7 |
| 2017 | Ty Dolla Sign | "Love U Better" (featuring Lil Wayne and The-Dream) | Beach House 3 |
| 2017 | Fifth Harmony | "Angel" | Fifth Harmony |
| 2017 | Ty Dolla Sign | "So Am I" (featuring Damian Marley and Skrillex) | Beach House 3 |
| 2017 | Galantis | "Salvage (Up All Night)" (featuring Poo Bear) | The Aviary |
| 2017 | Alesso | "Is That for Me" (with Anitta) | Non-album single |
| 2017 | Ty Dolla Sign | "Famous" | Beach House 3 |
| 2017 | Ty Dolla Sign | "Side Effects" | Beach House 3 |
| 2017 | Sam Smith | "Burning" | The Thrill of It All |
| 2017 | David Guetta | "So Far Away" (with Martin Garrix featuring Jamie Scott and Romy Dya) | 7 |
| 2018 | Jennifer Lopez | "Us" | Non-album single |
| 2018 | Stargate | "1Night" (featuring PartyNextDoor, 21 Savage and Murda Beatz) | Non-album single |
| 2018 | Labrinth | "Same Team" (with Stefflon Don) | Non-album single |
| 2018 | DJ Khaled | "No Brainer" (featuring Justin Bieber, Quavo and Chance the Rapper) | Father of Asahd |
| 2018 | Matoma | "Don't Say What You Want To" (featuring Yashua) | One in a Million |
| 2018 | Mariah Carey | "The Distance" (featuring Ty Dolla Sign) | Caution |
| 2018 | Taz Zavala | "Beauty & the Struggle" (with Arika Gluck) | Westside OST |
| 2018 | Mariah Carey | "One Mo' Gen" | Caution |
| 2018 | Mariah Carey | "8th Grade" | Caution |
| 2019 | Hikaru Utada | "Face My Fears" (with Skrillex) | Bad Mode |
| 2019 | One Ok Rock | "Head High" | Eye of the Storm |
| 2019 | Jesse & Joy | "Mañana Es Too Late" (with J Balvin) | Aire (Versión Día) |
| 2019 | Ed Sheeran | "I Don't Care" (with Justin Bieber) | No.6 Collaborations Project |
| 2019 | Billie Eilish | "Bad Guy (Remix)" (with Justin Bieber) | Non-album single |
| 2019 | Madison Ryann Ward | "Other Side" | Beyond Me EP |
| 2019 | FKA Twigs | "Holy Terrain" (featuring Future) | Magdalene |
| 2019 | Chris Brown | "Don't Check on Me" (with Justin Bieber) | Indigo |
| 2019 | Zac Brown Band | "Need This" | The Owl |
| 2019 | Zac Brown Band | "OMW" | The Owl |
| 2019 | Zac Brown Band | "Me and the Boys in the Band" | The Owl |
| 2019 | Zac Brown Band | "Finished What We Started" (featuring Brandi Carlile) | The Owl |
| 2019 | Bear and a Banjo | "Better Days" | Non-album single |
| 2019 | Dan + Shay | "10,000 Hours" (with Justin Bieber) | Non-album single |
| 2019 | Bear and a Banjo | "Lying's the New Truth" | Bear and a Banjo |
| 2019 | Bear and a Banjo | "No Way (That's Not America)" | Bear and a Banjo |
| 2019 | Bear and a Banjo | "Me and My Banjo" | Bear and a Banjo |
| 2019 | Bear and a Banjo | "Born this Way" | Bear and a Banjo |
| 2019 | Bear and a Banjo | "Can You Hear Me Now" (solo or with Zac Brown) | Bear and a Banjo |
| 2019 | Bear and a Banjo | "Behind the Preposition" | Bear and a Banjo |
| 2019 | Bear and a Banjo | "We Ain't Going Nowhere" | Bear and a Banjo |
| 2019 | Bear and a Banjo | "Gone But Not Forgotten" | Bear and a Banjo |
| 2020 | Justin Bieber | "Yummy" (solo or with Summer Walker) | Changes |
| 2020 | Justin Bieber | "Intentions" (featuring Quavo) | Changes |
| 2020 | Jesse & Joy | "Lo Nuestro Vale Mas" | Aire (Versión Día) |
| 2020 | Justin Bieber | "Forever" (featuring Post Malone and Clever) | Changes |
| 2020 | Justin Bieber | "All Around Me" | Changes |
| 2020 | Justin Bieber | "Habitual" | Changes |
| 2020 | Justin Bieber | "Come Around Me" | Changes |
| 2020 | Justin Bieber | "Available" | Changes |
| 2020 | Justin Bieber | "Running Over" (featuring Lil Dicky) | Changes |
| 2020 | Justin Bieber | "Take It Out on Me" | Changes |
| 2020 | Justin Bieber | "Second Emotion" (featuring Travis Scott) | Changes |
| 2020 | Justin Bieber | "Get Me" (featuring Kehlani) | Changes |
| 2020 | Justin Bieber | "E.T.A." | Changes |
| 2020 | Justin Bieber | "Changes" | Changes |
| 2020 | Justin Bieber | "Confirmation" | Changes |
| 2020 | Justin Bieber | "That's What Love Is" | Changes |
| 2020 | Justin Bieber | "At Least for Now" | Changes |
| 2020 | Bear and a Banjo | "New Beginning" | Bear and a Banjo |
| 2020 | PartyNextDoor | "Savage Anthem" | Partymobile |
| 2020 | Jesse & Joy | "Aires" | Aire (Versión Día) |
| 2020 | Jesse & Joy | "¿En Qué Nos Convertimos?" | Aire (Versión Día) |
