= Stay (Rihanna song) =

2012 single by Rihanna featuring Mikky Ekko

Single by Rihanna featuring Mikky Ekko

from the album Unapologetic
- B-side: "Diamonds" (remix)
- Released: December 13, 2012
- Recorded: 2012
- Studio: NightBird Recording Studios (West Hollywood, California); Westlake Recording Studios (Los Angeles, California)
- Genre: Pop; R&B
- Length: 4:00
- Label: Def Jam; SRP; Roc Nation
- Songwriters: John Sudduth; Justin Parker; Elof Loelv
- Producers: Mikky Ekko; Elof Loelv; Justin Parker; Kuk Harrell

Rihanna singles chronology
"Diamonds" (2012)	"Stay" (2012)	"Pour It Up" (2013)

Mikky Ekko singles chronology
"Pull Me Down" (2012)	"Stay" (2012)	"Kids" (2013)

Music video
- "Stay" on YouTube

"Stay" is a song by the Barbadian singer Rihanna featuring American singer Mikky Ekko recorded for Rihanna's seventh album, Unapologetic (2012). It was released as the second single from the album on December 13, 2012. "Stay" was co-written by Ekko and Justin Parker. The song's lyrics speak of temptation and the inability to resist true love. Music critics were generally positive in their opinion regarding the balladry and most described it as a standout track on the album.

Upon the release of Unapologetic, "Stay" charted on multiple charts worldwide. Following its release as a single, it reached number one in Bulgaria, Canada, the Czech Republic, Denmark and Israel and the top five in twenty-four countries worldwide including Australia, France, Germany, New Zealand, Norway, Switzerland and the United Kingdom. It peaked at number three on the US Billboard Hot 100, becoming Rihanna's twenty-fourth top ten on the chart, thus surpassing Whitney Houston's tally. Furthermore, it has charted at number one on the US Mainstream Top 40 chart and 16 on the Dance Club Songs chart. The single has sold over 10 million units worldwide.

The song's accompanying music video, directed by Sophie Muller, depicts Rihanna naked in a bathtub filled with cloudy water, while Ekko sings in a separate bathroom. Critics likened the vulnerability and raw emotion in the video to the song itself. Rihanna premiered "Stay" on Saturday Night Live in the United States, while she performed the song in the United Kingdom on the ninth series of The X Factor. Rihanna and Ekko also performed "Stay" at the 2013 Grammy Awards. The track was included on the set list of the majority of her 777 Tour promotional tour dates, in support of the album, while it was included on Rihanna's fifth headlining tour, the Diamonds World Tour in the encore and the opening song of her seventh headlining tour, the Anti World Tour.

== Production and release ==
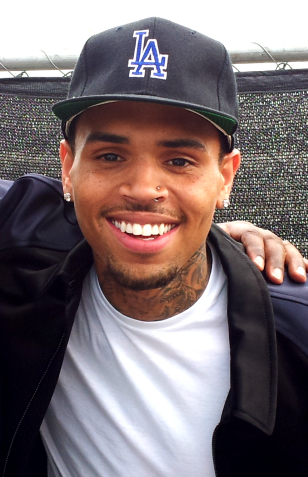
Singer Chris Brown appears on the artwork for "Stay".

I love love, but I'm not always romantic. That's probably why I wound up writing "Stay" in the first place. Lyrically it's coming from a pretty vulnerable place, but I needed to address that feeling. It's not easy for me to open up to people, but I think it's important for songs like "Stay" to come from an honest place if you want people to believe it.

— Mikky Ekko, 4 Music

Rihanna began working on the new sound for her seventh studio album in March 2012, even though she had not yet begun recording. During the production of the album, several musicians and producers were recruited including American singer Mikky Ekko and producer Justin Parker. According to Ekko, the production of the album was massive: "Their pace is insane. They had the studios we were working in booked out for three months, on a cycle. It was like nothing I had ever experienced before." "Stay" was written and produced by Parker, Ekko and Elof Loelv. Initially, when they wrote the song, Ekko didn't like it because of its vulnerability; however, collaborators convinced him to listen to "Stay" again. After another listen, he understood that the song was very important to him, adding that "the track had become so special to me as well, and knowing what the track means to me and what I think it means to her too."

Shortly after Rihanna's management took over the song, Ekko met her in Los Angeles where she told him she already sang the vocals, about which he reacted positively. Rihanna's and Ekko's vocals were recorded at two recording locations by three people: Mike Gaydusek at NightBird Recording Studios and Marcos Tovar and Kuk Harrell at Westlake Recording Studios, both in Los Angeles. Vocal engineering was done by Gaydusek and assisted by Blake Mares and Robert Cohen. Vocal production was completed by Kuk Harrell. It was mixed by Phil Tan at Ninja Club Studios in Atlanta, Georgia. Additional production was performed by Daniella Rivera. "Stay" was sent to French radio on December 13, 2012, as the second single from Unapologetic. It later impacted the United Kingdom on January 7, 2013. In the United States, "Stay" was released to adult contemporary radio stations on January 28, 2013, and to contemporary hit radio and rhythmic contemporary radio the next day, as the third single in the country following "Diamonds" and "Pour It Up". It was released as a CD single in Germany on February 15, 2013.

== Composition and lyrics ==
"Stay" (2012)
A 24-second sample of Rihanna's "Stay", featuring Mikky Ekko.

"Stay" is a pop and R&B ballad that consists of piano and bass guitar instrumentation. It is written in the key of C major, having the chord progression of C-Dm-Am-F. The song has a moderate tempo of 112 beats per minute. Rihanna's vocal range in the song ranges from the low note of A_{3} to the high note of E_{5}. Greg Kot for the Chicago Tribune described the song as being "stripped-bare". The lyrics revolve around "failing to resist true love", according to Dan Martin for NME, as Rihanna sings "Funny, you're the broken one/ But I'm the only one who needed saving." According to Jocelyn Vena for MTV, Rihanna "punctuates the emotions of the track" on the lyric "It's not much of a life you're living/ It's not just something you take [it's] given." Rihanna also makes a plea to her lover, singing "'Round and around and around and around we go/ Now, tell me now, tell me now, tell me now you know/ Not really sure how to feel about it/ Something in the way you move/ Makes me feel like I can't live without you/ it takes me all the way/ I want you to stay." Lewis Corner for Digital Spy wrote that Rihanna's vocals glow over the simple yet effective piano riffs.

== Awards ==
Year	Ceremony	Award	Result
2013	MTV Video Music Award	Best Female Video	Nominated
2014	iHeartRadio Music Awards	Song of the Year	Won
2014	iHeartRadio Music Awards	Best Collaboration	Nominated
2014	Grammy Award	Best Pop Duo/Group Performance	Nominated
2014	Teen Choice Awards	Choice Music: Break-Up Song	Nominated
2014	World Music Awards	World's Best Song	Nominated
2014	World Music Awards	World's Best Video	Nominated

== Critical reception ==
"Stay" received favorable reviews from music critics. Jon Dolan for Rolling Stone was complimentary of Rihanna's execution of the song, writing that she performs it "within an inch of its life" and "pleads at the piano." Dolan continued to state that it is "stark" and "shadowy" which is "confrontationally honest." Dan Martin for NME described "Stay" as Unapologetic's highlight, writing that it is a "gorgeous piano ballad." Martin continued to write that the song "puts a vulnerable spin on the Brown situation, repeating another theme of the album", a reference to her relationship with Chris Brown. Smokey Fontaine for The Huffington Post also praised "Stay", placing emphasis on Rihanna's vocal performance. He wrote that "Three years ago, no one would have paid attention to a beautiful piano-ballad like 'Stay.' Not because of the events we all witnessed, but because of how honest and emotionally-connected her vocals are."

Lewis Corner for Digital Spy awarded "Stay" four out of five stars, commenting that Rihanna "doesn't need all the controversial romp to top the charts." Corner also compared "Stay" to the work of "some of 2012's most successful female balladeers" Emeli Sandé and Lana Del Rey and concluded by stating that Rihanna "never [follows] the pack" but "[airs] her seemingly complex emotions through music's current trend." The song garnered a mixed review from Genevieve Koski for The A.V. Club, writing that the album is "heavy on the sort of milquetoast ballads that have never been Rihanna's specialty" with regard to "Stay" and "What Now". In addition, Jon Caramanica for The New York Times negatively critiqued the song, calling it "dull" and one of the "least texturally confrontational" on the album.

== Chart performance ==
=== North America ===
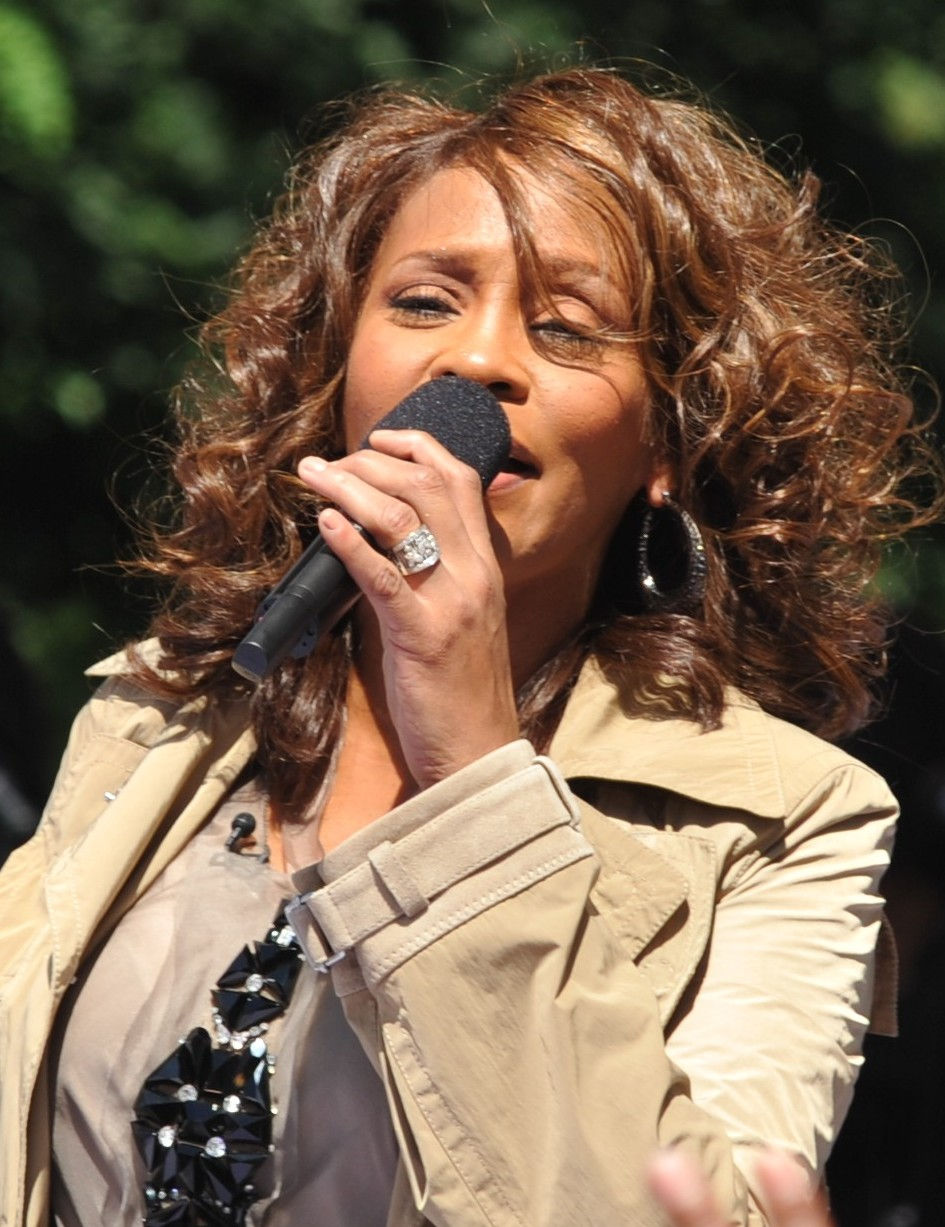
With "Stay" becoming Rihanna's twenty-fourth top ten on the US Billboard Hot 100, Rihanna passed Whitney Houston's tally of top tens.

Following Rihanna and Ekko's performance at the 55th Annual Grammy Awards on February 10, 2013, the song entered the US Digital Songs chart at number 25 for the issue dated February 23, seeing a 289% increase in sales to 67,000 copies sold. It subsequently debuted on the Billboard Hot 100 at number 57, rocketing to number three the week after, following the chart's new policy that allowed YouTube streaming to count towards the single's chart performance. The surge was also due to the large 358% increase of digital downloads to 306,000 sales sold that week, rising to number two on the Digital Songs chart. With the new Hot 100 peak, Rihanna gained her 24th top 10 on the chart, surpassing Whitney Houston's tally of 23. The following week, the song slipped to number seven, selling 213,000 copies while bounding from number 57 to 36 on the Radio Songs chart. In its third total week on the Hot 100, "Stay" rebounded to number five, selling 211,000 downloads and charging from number 36 to 23 on the Radio Songs chart. In its fourth week on the Hot 100, the song again climbed to number four, surging from number 23 to 16 on the Radio Songs chart, and increasing 12% in download sales to 236,000 copies sold. With this, "Stay" passed the one million downloads-sold barrier, becoming Rihanna's 27th title (including featured appearances) to reach the sales milestone. The following week it rose to number 11 on the Radio Songs chart, selling 222,000 digital copies. For the issue dated April 6, "Stay" ascended to number six on the Radio Songs chart, marking Rihanna's 22nd top 10 on the chart. With this, she trails only Mariah Carey (23) for the most top tens in the tally's archives. For the date issued, May 11, 2013, "Stay" topped the Radio Songs chart, marking Rihanna's 11th number one on the chart, thus tying her with Mariah Carey for the most leaders dating to the BDS-based chart's December 1990 inception. With the ascension, the song climbed from six to its previous peak of number three on the Hot 100.

"Stay" first charted in the United States on the Mainstream Top 40 chart at number 34, on the issue dated February 16, 2013. On the issue dated March 30, 2013, the song climbed into the top 10 of the chart at number nine. For the issue dated May 4, 2013, "Stay" rose from number two to one on the Pop Songs chart, tallying her 10th leader. With this, she broke a tie with Katy Perry for the most toppers in the chart's 20-year history. Also notably, "Stay" is only the second piano-and-vocal-only number one to have ruled Pop Songs, following Bruno Mars' "When I Was Your Man". "Stay" debuted on the US Dance Club Songs chart at number 47 for the issue dated March 30, 2013. "Stay" also became Rihanna's third top ten on the Adult Pop Songs chart, charting at number two. Furthermore, it peaked at number five on the Adult Contemporary chart. By July 2013, "Stay" had sold over 3 million digital copies, marking Rihanna's 10th song to pass the three million sales mark. The song became the 10th best-selling song of 2013 in the US, with 3,854,000 copies sold for the year. As of June 2015, the song has sold 4,480,000 copies in the US.

The song entered the Canadian Hot 100 at number 58, for the week dated December 8, 2012. It re-entered the chart for the week of February 23, 2013, at number 37. The following week, it leaped to number three, where it remained for a further week before climbing to number two for the week of March 16, 2013. The following week, "Stay" reached number one, becoming Rihanna's eighth single to top the chart, and second consecutive following "Diamonds". It remained number one for three consecutive weeks.

=== Europe and Oceania ===
In the United Kingdom, "Stay" debuted on the UK Hip Hop and R&B Singles Chart at number 16 on November 25, 2012, due to strong digital download sales following the release of Unapologetic. It also entered the UK Singles Chart at number 102 in the same week. Following Rihanna's performance of the song on The X Factor the previous week, "Stay" re-entered the UK Singles Chart at number six on December 22, 2012. The following week it climbed to a new peak of number four. Over the next five weeks, the song fluctuated inside the top ten, again returning to its number four peak on two separate occasions. As of February 2013, "Stay" has sold over 394,000 copies in the UK. "Stay" debuted in Ireland at number 15 for the week ending December 13, 2012. Elsewhere in Europe, the song debuted at number 53 in both France and Switzerland, following the release of the album. After three weeks of charting outside of the top 100, "Stay" returned to its former peak of 53 in France on January 5, 2013. It reached a peak of number two in its twelfth week on the chart. "Stay" also reached number one in Denmark on March 1, 2013, marking Rihanna's fifth number one in the country, and second consecutive following "Diamonds"' charting.

"Stay" entered the singles chart in New Zealand at number 28 on December 24, 2012. The following week it climbed to number 25 and in its third week to a new peak of 16. On January 14, 2013, it climbed into the top ten to number nine, marking Rihanna's 28th top ten single, and fifth consecutive. The song remained at the position for five consecutive weeks, before marking a new peak of number seven in its ninth total week on the chart. The following week, "Stay" climbed to number six, where it returned two weeks later after a drop to number seven. After the song fell again to number seven, it managed a new top five peak of four in its fourteenth week on the chart. The song has been certified double-platinum by the Recording Industry Association of New Zealand for sales of 30,000 copies. In Australia, "Stay" debuted at number 43 for the issue dated January 20, 2013. The following week it climbed to number 28, and into the top 20 to number 12 the week after. In its fourth week, the song made a new peak of number 11. The following week it dropped to 13, but rebounded into the top ten to mark a new peak of number six in its sixth total week on the chart, following the release of the music video. With this, the song became Rihanna's 24th top ten single in the country. The following week, it climbed to number five, managing a higher position than the album's lead single, "Diamonds". In its eighth week on the chart, "Stay" climbed to number four, marking a new peak. It has received a 14-times platinum certification by the Australian Recording Industry Association for sales of 980,000 copies.

According to the International Federation of the Phonographic Industry, it sold 7.9 million copies worldwide in 2013.

== Music video ==
=== Background ===
The music video for "Stay" was directed by Sophie Muller. On February 10, 2013, whilst walking the red carpet of the 55th Annual Grammy Awards, Rihanna held an interview with Ryan Seacrest who officially revealed that the music video would premiere on E! News the following day. Rihanna described the production saying, "The video was really, really simple. I pretty much stayed put in a bathtub, and we shot it really tight, really close. There's Mikky Ekko in the video as well. This is the first time I've ever collaborated with him, so I'm excited about that because he's actually the one who wrote the song and I kinda just fell in love with it so much and in love with the tone of his voice and we wanna keep him a part of it, so you'll see him in the video." The singer added, "It's a very emotional song and it's personal, so you just think about, it's almost like telling a story, and when you tell a story, even to yourself – if you're saying it out loud and expressing how you feel – it needs to be powerful because it needs to be authentic." On February 11, Rihanna leaked an "uncut" version of the video on Twitter prior to the official premiere, featuring the singer performing to the track in one singular take, without Mikky Ekko.

=== Synopsis ===
The video opens with a shot of running water. Rihanna is then presented undressing and climbing into a bathtub. Throughout the rest of the video, the singer is presented nude in the tub full of cloudy green water; subtle camera angles protect her modesty. Rihanna is shown wearing little make-up and with long hair tangled and wet over one side of her face. The singer flickers her eyes to the ceiling and puts her head in her hands, showing off long manicured nails and a diamond stud earring. The low-key video also features Mikky Ekko, who performs his parts of the song separately including scenes of him perched on the edge of a different bathtub, gazing into a mirror, in front of an unlit fireplace, and sitting on a grand chair. The video switches between the pair throughout the course of the video until it concludes with a single tear falling from Rihanna's eye as she sinks lower into the bathtub.

=== Reception ===
A reviewer of The Huffington Post commented, "The heartfelt ballad, from her latest album Unapologetic, is full of emotion – and the video matches that, as a stripped-down Rihanna soaks in a tub." August Brown of the Los Angeles Times commented on the video saying, "We kind of want to curl up in a hot shower and have a good cry ourselves." They continued saying, "It's kind of an echo of her famous "We Found Love" video, with that clip's quick-cut, drugged-up frenzy of bad romance replaced with solitary, locked-off shots that feel more intimate than exploitative. She looks amazing, but the focus isn't so much her body as the look of constant devastation on her face." Brown summarised the clip as being "appropriately minimalist[ic]" and concluded calling it "a beautiful video that broadens Rihanna's emotional-musical palette." Bené Viera of VH1 commented on the video saying, "Usually the tough girl posturing is a cover-up for a very sensitive soul. Rihanna cut the 'I don't give an eff' attitude for four minutes of makeup-free, teary-eyed, glistening wet, raw emotion in the video for 'Stay.'" Sarah Flanigan of Yahoo! thought the video shows "a softer side of [Rihanna's] personality audiences rarely get to see." She also stated, "There are no gimmicks, no flashy clothes, just a very raw and emotional performance allowing her to tell this love story in her own words." Jenna Hally Rubenstein of MTV labelled the video as "perfectly heartbreaking/emotionally vulnerable" and thought the "baptismal effect" of the video "feels like a seamless transition from Rihanna's 'Diamonds' video." Tamar Anitai also of MTV compared the video to Britney Spears' "Everytime" (2004), writing that both videos "are equal parts stunning and sobering, haunting and harrowing, and both feature impossibly famous singers reflecting upon damaged relationships while inviting us into their well-designed bathrooms as they vulnerably perform their ablutions." Rihanna's "Stay" video was also compared to and said to be inspired by Janet Jackson's "Every Time" video, as well as Britney Spears' "Everytime" video, with one critic noting "Rihanna isn't the first pop star to brood in a bathtub. Janet Jackson and Britney Spears also bared their emotion immersed in water. Janet bared all in a blue lagoon for her 'Every Time' video. A little less glam, Britney's tub scene in her 'Everytime' video proved dark foreshadowing into her troubled world."

== Live performances ==
As part of promotion for the release of Unapologetic on November 19, 2012, Rihanna premiered "Stay" on Saturday Night Live on November 10, 2012. She also performed the album's lead single "Diamonds". Rihanna performed a solo version of "Stay", without guest vocalist Ekko. Rihanna wore a Bob Marley dress and adorned red lipstick. Jocelyn Vena for MTV praised the singer's performance, writing "Rihanna used her touching vocals to prove that not only can she sex up a performance but she can also sing the heck out of one." Erika Ramirez noted that Rihanna "belted out the song."

During the seven days prior to the release of the album, Rihanna embarked on the 777 Tour, a seven-date promotional tour where she performed seven concerts in seven cities in seven countries across North America and Europe. Not included on the set list at the first concert in Mexico City, she performed "Stay" at the second concert in Toronto as part of a medley with "Love the Way You Lie". The solo version of the song was performed the third concert in Stockholm. At the fourth concert in Paris, it was performed as the ninth song out of 13 in between "S&M" and "Where Have You Been", preceded by a snippet of "Take Care". The fifth and sixth concerts were held in Berlin and London, respectively, where Rihanna performed "Stay" both nights in between "S&M" and "Unfaithful". The seventh and final concert was held in New York City, where "Stay" was also performed. Erika Ramirez for Billboard attended all seven concerts as part of the press committee, where she described the audience as being in a "trance" as the singer performed the song.

Rihanna performed "Stay" together with Mikky Ekko at the 2013 Grammy Awards on February 10, 2013. The performance featured the singer standing in front of a "dimly lit set" and was dressed in a long "curve-hugging" dark dress. Mikael Wood of Los Angeles Times positively reviewed the performance and wrote that it was the most memorable moment of the night. Charley Rogulewski of Vibe in a review of the rendition wrote, "Her [Rihanna's] beautiful voice took center stage during the duet, assuring those watching why she was worthy of her six Grammys". A reviewer of Capital FM wrote that Rihanna looked visibly moved by the performance as she showed her "impressive vocals". The solo version of "Stay" is included as part of the set list on Rihanna's fifth headlining concert tour, the "Diamonds World Tour", as the twenty-seventh track and first of the encore. The song served as an opening song on her seventh headlining tour the Anti World Tour. She also performed the song at the 2016 MTV Video Music Awards.

== Cover versions ==
- A short teaser of American singer Adam Lambert performing a cover of "Stay" was released online on February 11, 2013. The singer revealed via Twitter that it was only a preview in rehearsals and that there was "more to come". The video release came after Lambert praised Rihanna and Ekko's Grammy performance the previous night, saying "best she's ever sounded!! Wow. Full of such beautiful and haunting emotion." The singer later performed a full version of the song, with the album track "Underneath" from his album Trespassing, at his "We Are Glamily" tour in Tokyo.
- On February 15, 2013, a video was unveiled of Vin Diesel performing a karaoke-style cover of the song, which he recorded for his partner for Valentine's Day. The recording featured the music video running in the background.
- On May 17, 2013, singer Fatin Shidqia performed "Stay" on Grand Final X Factor Indonesia.
- On May 18, 2013, Demi Lovato covered the song during their shows in Mansfield, Massachusetts, San Antonio, California, and Los Angeles.
- On July 1, 2013, R&B singers RaVaughn and Kiley Dean each released a version of "Stay" on YouTube.
- Low performed the song during the Pitchfork Festival 2013 and later released their cover on iTunes, with the proceeds donated to nonprofit organization Rock For Kids.
- On September 18, 2018, American musician Cat Power released a cover of the song as the third single from her tenth studio album, Wanderer (2018).
- Thirty Seconds to Mars covered the song on BBC Radio 1's Live Lounge (UK). The very popular cover has amassed 69m views (as of April 2024), on the Live Lounge YouTube channel.
- American EDM producer and DJ, Illenium released the song "I Want You 2 (Stay)" as part of his fifth, self-titled album, the forementioned track samples and interpolates the song, and was released with the album on April 28, 2023.

== Track listing ==
- CD
1. "Stay" (featuring Mikky Ekko) – 4:00
2. "Diamonds" (remix; featuring Kanye West) – 4:48

== Credits and personnel ==
Recording

- Recorded at NightBird Recording Studios, West Hollywood, California; Westlake Recording Studios, Los Angeles, California.
- Mixed at Ninja Club Studios, Atlanta, Georgia.

Personnel

- Lead vocals – Rihanna
- Guest vocals – Mikky Ekko (courtesy of RCA Records)
- Songwriting and production – Mikky Ekko, Justin Parker, Elof Loelv
- Additional production/Landscape – Justin Parker, Elof Loelv
- Vocal recording – Mike Gaydusek, Marcus Tovar, Kuk Harrel
- Vocal engineering – Mike Gaydusek
- Assistant vocal engineer – Blake Mares, Robert Cohen
- Piano – Justin Parker
- Vocal production – Kuk Harrell
- Mixing – Phil Tan
- Assistant/additional engineering – Daniella Rivera

Credits adapted from the liner notes of Unapologetic, Def Jam Recordings, SRP Records.

== Charts ==
=== Weekly charts ===
Weekly chart performance
Chart (2013–2014)	Peak position
Australia (ARIA)	4
Austria (Ö3 Austria Top 40)	5
Belgium (Ultratop 50 Flanders)	3
Belgium (Ultratop 50 Wallonia)	2
Bulgaria Airplay (BAMP)	1
Brazil (Brasil Hot 100 Airplay)	34
Brazil (Brasil Hot Pop Songs)	5
Canada Hot 100 (Billboard)	1
Czech Republic Airplay (ČNS IFPI)	1
Denmark (Tracklisten)	1
Euro Digital Song Sales (Billboard)	4
Euro Digital Tracks (Billboard) Explicit album version	2
Finnish Download Chart	5
France (SNEP)	2
Germany (GfK)	2
Hungary (Editors' Choice Top 40)	15
Hungary (Single Top 40)	10
Iceland (Tónlist)	7
Ireland (IRMA)	2
Israel International Airplay (Media Forest)	1
Italy (FIMI)	17
Japan Hot 100 (Billboard)	97
Lebanon (The Official Lebanese Top 20)	5
Luxembourg (Billboard)	3
Mexico Anglo (Monitor Latino)	5
Netherlands (Dutch Top 40)	3
Netherlands (Single Top 100)	3
New Zealand (Recorded Music NZ)	4
Norway (VG-lista)	2
Poland Airplay (ZPAV)	3
Portugal (AFP)	2
Romania (Airplay 100)	17
Scottish Singles Sales (Official Charts)	4
Slovakia Airplay (ČNS IFPI)	2
Slovenia (SloTop50)	12
South Africa Airplay (EMA)	5
Spain (Promusicae)	5
Switzerland (Schweizer Hitparade)	2
UK Singles (Official Charts)	4
UK Hip Hop/R&B (Official Charts)	2
US Billboard Hot 100	3
US Adult Contemporary (Billboard)	3
US Adult Pop Airplay (Billboard)	2
US Dance Club Songs (Billboard)	16
US Dance Airplay (Billboard)	10
US Pop Airplay (Billboard)	1
US Rhythmic Airplay (Billboard)	2

2023–2025 weekly chart performance
Chart (2023–2025)	Peak position
Global 200 (Billboard)	83
Portugal (AFP)	167
Sweden (Sverigetopplistan)	80
UK Hip Hop/R&B (Official Charts)	11

=== Year-end charts ===
2012 year-end chart performance
Chart (2012)	Position
UK Singles (OCC)	140

2013 year-end chart performance
Chart (2013)	Position
Australia (ARIA)	11
Austria (Ö3 Austria Top 40)	41
Belgium (Ultratop 50 Flanders)	21
Belgium (Ultratop 50 Wallonia)	14
Brazil (Crowley)	42
Canada (Canadian Hot 100)	5
Denmark (IFPI Danmark)	10
France (SNEP)	11
Germany (Official German Charts)	24
Global Top Digital Singles (IFPI)	10
Italy (Musica e dischi)	99
Netherlands (Dutch Top 40)	8
Netherlands (Single Top 100)	20
New Zealand (Recorded Music NZ)	13
Poland (IFPI Poland)	4
Spain (PROMUSICAE)	22
Switzerland (Schweizer Hitparade)	13
UK Singles (OCC)	22
US Billboard Hot 100	13
US Adult Contemporary (Billboard)	8
US Adult Top 40 (Billboard)	17
US Dance/Mix Show Airplay (Billboard)	49
US Mainstream Top 40 (Billboard)	12
US Radio Songs (Billboard)	7
US Rhythmic (Billboard)	17
Worldwide (IFPI)	10

2014 year-end chart performance
Chart (2014)	Position
France (SNEP)	167

2025 year-end chart performance
Chart (2025)	Position
Belgium (Ultratop 50 Flanders)	145

=== Decade-end charts ===
Decade-end chart performance
Chart (2010–2019)	Position
Australia (ARIA)	98

=== All-time charts ===
All-time chart performance
Chart	Position
Dutch Love Songs (Dutch Top 40)	16

== Certifications ==
Certifications
Region	Certification	Certified units/sales
Australia (ARIA)	14× Platinum	980,000^{‡}
Belgium (BRMA)	Platinum	30,000^{*}
Brazil (Pro-Música Brasil)	2× Diamond	500,000^{‡}
Denmark (IFPI Danmark)	3× Platinum	270,000^{‡}
France	—	165,000
Germany (BVMI)	3× Gold	450,000^{‡}
Italy (FIMI)	2× Platinum	100,000^{‡}
New Zealand (RMNZ)	7× Platinum	210,000^{‡}
Portugal (AFP)	2× Platinum	40,000^{‡}
Spain (Promusicae)	2× Platinum	120,000^{‡}
United Kingdom (BPI)	4× Platinum	2,400,000^{‡}
United States (RIAA)	12× Platinum	12,000,000^{‡}
^{*} Sales figures based on certification alone.^{‡} Sales+streaming figures based on certification alone.

== Release history ==
Release history
Region	Date	Format(s)	Version	Label	Ref.
France	December 13, 2012	Radio airplay	Original	Universal	
United Kingdom	January 7, 2013	Radio airplay	Original	Mercury	
United States	January 28, 2013	Adult contemporary radio; hot adult contemporary radio; modern adult contemporary radio	Original	Def Jam	
United States	January 29, 2013	Contemporary hit radio; rhythmic contemporary radio	Original	Def Jam	
Germany	February 15, 2013	CD	2-track	Universal	
Italy	February 15, 2013	Radio airplay	Original	Universal	

== See also ==
- List of Canadian Hot 100 number-one singles of 2013
- List of number-one hits of 2013 (Denmark)
- List of UK top-ten singles in 2013
- List of Billboard Mainstream Top 40 number-one songs of 2013
- List of Billboard Hot 100 top-ten singles in 2013
- List of highest-certified singles in Australia
