= Recovery (Justin Bieber song) =

Single by Justin Bieber

from the album Journals
- Released: October 28, 2013
- Recorded: July 19–23, 2013
- Studio: Sanctum Sound (Boston, Massachusetts); Cherry Beach Sound (Toronto, Canada)
- Genre: R&B; soul
- Length: 3:02
- Label: Island; RBMG; Schoolboy
- Songwriters: Justin Bieber; Dominic Jordan; Jimmy Giannos; Jason Boyd; Jamal Rashid; Craig David; Mark Hill
- Producer: The Audibles

Justin Bieber singles chronology
"Wait for a Minute" (2013)	"Recovery" (2013)	"Bad Day" (2013)

Lyric video
- "Recovery" on YouTube

"Recovery" is a song recorded by Canadian singer Justin Bieber for his second compilation album, Journals (2013). The song was released on October 28, 2013, as a digital download. The song is the fourth in Bieber's series Music Mondays, the first three being "Heartbreaker" (October 7), "All That Matters" (October 14) and "Hold Tight" (October 21). Bieber released a new single every week for 10 weeks from October 7 to December 9, 2013.

"Recovery" heavily interpolates the guitar riff from Craig David's "Fill Me In".

== Track listing ==
Digital download
No.	Title	Length
1.	"Recovery"	3:02

== Charts ==
Chart (2013–14)	Peak position
Austria (Ö3 Austria Top 40)	49
Belgium (Ultratop 50 Flanders)	23
Belgium Urban (Ultratop Flanders)	6
Belgium (Ultratop 50 Wallonia)	29
Canada Hot 100 (Billboard)	30
Denmark (Tracklisten)	5
France (SNEP)	56
Germany (GfK)	50
Ireland (IRMA)	25
Netherlands (Single Top 100)	14
Scottish Singles Sales (Official Charts)	37
Spain (Promusicae)	24
Switzerland (Schweizer Hitparade)	33
UK Hip Hop/R&B (Official Charts)	4
UK Singles (Official Charts)	28
US Billboard Hot 100	41
US Hot R&B/Hip-Hop Songs (Billboard)	13
