= Journals (album) =

Compilation album by Justin Bieber
- Released: December 23, 2013
- Genre: R&B
- Length: 55:03
- Labels: Island; RBMG; Schoolboy
- Producers: Justin Bieber; T-Minus; Sir Nolan; D.K. The Punisher; Diplo; Poo Bear; Maejor Ali; Soundz; Darkchild; Andre Harris; the Audibles; Chef Tone

Justin Bieber chronology
Believe Acoustic (2013)	Journals (2013)	Purpose (2015)

Singles from Journals
- 1. "Heartbreaker" Released: October 7, 2013; 2. "All That Matters" Released: October 14, 2013; 3. "Hold Tight" Released: October 21, 2013; 4. "Recovery" Released: October 28, 2013; 5. "Bad Day" Released: November 4, 2013; 6. "All Bad" Released: November 11, 2013; 7. "PYD" Released: November 18, 2013; 8. "Roller Coaster" Released: November 25, 2013; 9. "Change Me" Released: December 2, 2013; 10. "Confident" Released: December 9, 2013

Journals is the second compilation album by the Canadian singer Justin Bieber. It was released through Island Records on December 23, 2013. The album features guest appearances from R. Kelly, Chance the Rapper, Lil Wayne, Future, and Big Sean. Journals is an R&B album that sees Bieber mostly deal with themes of heartbreak and forgiveness in a romantic relationship. To achieve a more mature sound, production was handled by a variety of record producers, such as new producers Poo Bear, Maejor Ali, Andre Harris, D.K. the Punisher, Soundz, and the Audibles, as well as previous producers Chef Tone, T-Minus, Diplo, Darkchild and Sir Nolan. A ten-week digital download campaign titled Music Mondays, in which one new song was released every Monday night, was held from October 7, 2013, to December 9, 2013. In addition to the songs released on Music Mondays, Journals is also composed of five other previously unreleased songs.

Despite Bieber reaching number one on the Billboard Social 50 popularity chart in the United States during the album's promotion, it did not chart on the US Billboard 200 until 2026. It has been certified platinum by the RIAA. It reached the top-forty in some countries and debuted in the top 10 only in Denmark and Norway. It was initially only released digitally, but was eventually released on LP in 2016.

The album was met with lukewarm reviews from music critics. Although some praised its mature direction and labeled it his best material, others dismissed its similar themes and "unfinished" production. The album has since come to be regarded as a cult favorite among Bieber's fans.

== Background and recording ==
While touring with his Believe Tour throughout 2012 and 2013, Justin Bieber managed to write new songs every day. According to his manager, Scooter Braun, the writing process had him "writing one to two songs a day for the entire tour and [...] label[ing] them by the city he wr[o]te them in." In January 2013, Bieber confirmed he was writing for a new album, as well as American R&B singer R. Kelly that confirmed he was working with Bieber on the album. Meanwhile, in June of the same year, he confirmed a new album, the rest of the Believe Tour and a movie for 2013. In July, Braun gave an interview for MTV News, where he discussed the album, claiming: "For this project, we want to do things a little bit differently. And there are more songs than 10 or 12, so if you have more music and you have more things you want to express, you gotta think out the box, and [think like] ’How do I get this out there in a unique way where it gets directly to my fans and I can express myself through music directly to them?’ And I think that's what it's about when you have people who are incredibly creative, things happen." In August, Bieber confirmed he was working with American rapper Future. It was also reported he was working with Juicy J, Ludacris and Big Sean. In December, he also confirmed he was working with Chance the Rapper and Lil Wayne.

As executive producer, Justin enlisted previous collaborators such as Rodney Jerkins, Maejor, Diplo and Sir Nolan, while working with a range of new R&B producers such as The Audibles, Andre Harris, D.K. the Punisher, Soundz, Chef Tone, T-Minus, Jason "Poo Bear" Boyd and others. Boyd became one of the most frequent collaborators on the album, writing with Bieber several songs as well as producing some. According to the producer, Bieber suggested they to "flip those Craig David chords and [...] create something." By doing so, he came up with the song "Recovery", a song that was finished at Cherry Beach Sound in Toronto. As he recalled, the process had Bieber hearing Boyd songs and selected them to sing, and many songs from the producer turned into songs off Journals. Boyd continued: "He [Bieber] just felt them so much, so strongly. It was just a matter of me letting go of the fact that I don't care about me being a singer more so than I care about putting great music out into the universe. Then I was able to do it. The songs that I felt like were too mature, we changed them up to fit him like a custom suit."

== Composition ==
An R&B album, Journals steps away from Bieber's more teen-pop sound of his previous efforts, while also having pop influences. As claimed by Spin's Brandon Soderberg, "[s]onically, it's up there with Beyoncé in terms of holding tight to the patience of '80s and '90s R&B while never forgetting the sugar-rush rewards of pop." Soderberg also reflected that Bieber was inspired by many R&B artists such as "Aaliyah, Drake, Frank Ocean, Sufjan Stevens, Sade, and Usher out of EDM mode." According to one of its producers, Jason Boyd, "Justin grew up listening to R&B. Journals was trying because it was going against the grain [of what he had been doing sonically], but it served so much of a purpose in him growing up." Chris Martins of Billboard also noted that the album "drew on Boyd's experience writing for 112, Usher and Chris Brown."

The album is composed of many "slow numbers", such as "Hold Tight", "All Bad" and "PYD", which Carl Williot of Idolator considered "racy, restrained jams in the vein of The Weeknd's mixtapes (minus the danger), each utilizing the bare minimum in terms of percussion." "One Life" was also noted for having influences by The Weeknd and Frank Ocean. Williot also noted that "'Roller Coaster' took the disco-pop and pop-funk craze of 2013 and marries it to trap stomps, as well as "freestyle-meets-Sonic the Hedgehog roller-skating grooves", completed Soderberg. "Bad Day" and "Swap It Out" flirt with late nostalgic '90s R&B/bling rap sweet spot, while "Confident" and closer "Memphis" channel Timbaland's prime with their brittle, syncopated percussion and background yelps." "Change Me', as noted by Soderberg, has a "The Tony Rich Project" feel to it, while "Backpack" is a futuristic pop song with a guitar solo. The music is slower and more restrained, with clean-toned electric guitar licks and gently stuttering R&B groove; "Recovery" features a "Craig David-sampling swoon" of "Fill Me In", "All that Matters" pushes Bieber's "earnest vocal into the limelight over an instrumental that relies on little more than swirling guitar strums and plush bass," and "Heartbreaker" features "chords [that] swim in and out of focus over a low-slung groove and vocals [that] float menacingly somewhere over your head" as Fact's Aimee Cliff noticed.

== Music and lyrics ==
Journals main themes deal with heartbreak and forgiveness in a romantic relationship, with many critics noting that it was influenced by Bieber's relationship with former girlfriend Selena Gomez. It finds the singer apologizing, taking responsibility for bad behavior and pledging lifelong faithfulness, while also talking about sex in some songs. Adam R. Holz of Plugged In (publication) noted that "'Journals' is a mournfully desperate, frequently "freaky" set of songs that finds the 19-year-old Canadian singer begging for a second chance with an ex. And it's tempting to buy in to Justin Bieber's repeated pleas for one last loop-around with his beloved. That's because the painfully plaintive nature of his repeated pleas gives him an air of wounded authenticity. It's not hard to believe that he really has lost the one girl (Selena Gomez) who means everything to him, and that he'll do anything to win her back."

The first song, "Heartbreaker" co-produced by Maejor, finds Bieber begging for his lover to not break his heart, "suggest[ing] that while he's got real flaws, those shouldn't completely disqualify him" and "pledg[ing] love through ups and downs, good times and bad." "I know the seasons may change/And sometimes love goes from sunshine to rain/ … I still believe in us/I still believe in love," he sings. "All That Matters" continues in the same vein, with lines like: "Oh, oh, whenever you're not in my presence/It feels like I'm missing my blessings, yeah." "Hold Tight" "focuses almost exclusively on sex," while "Recovery" finds Bieber " taking responsibility for mistakes and praying for a second chance." "Bad Day" and "All Bad" shared similarities, with the first talking about a painful break-up, while the latter has him "assuring a lover that the haters have him all wrong" and, according to Holz, making a "meanspirited and sexist accusation" about how "females like to run their mouths." "PYD" features Bieber and R. Kelly singing about "having sex with a woman in just about as many locations as they can brainstorm. The titular acronym stands for "put you down," a slang reference to sex."

The eighth track, "Roller Coaster", which references "Ohio Players' 1970s hit "Love Rollercoaster", talks about the loneliness of long-distance loving, while the piano ballad "Change Me" is about "accepting responsibility before proposing a solution to a problem he didn't even have." "Confident" talks about someone he's apparently just spied, while Chance the Rapper also talks about the song's main subject. "One Life", co-written by Drake, "offers another take on those sorts of faithfulness pledges", having a "YOLO [you only live once] with a conscience" theme. "Backpack" finds Bieber "fall[ing] in love with an alien girl whom he desires to 'stay in my backpack forever'." "What's Hatnin'" focuses on conflict resolution and forgiveness, "Swap It Out" "looks into the complicated feelings that go into a relationship," and "Memphis" "finds Bieber exploring a relationship, wherein he wants to be with his butterfly-giving girl 24/7." The bonus song, "Flatline", "explores a failed relationship, due to his busy schedule and the girl in question always contacting him at the wrong times, then not returning the phone calls he attempts to make."

== Release and promotion ==
On October 3, 2013, Bieber announced that he would release one new song every Monday for 10 weeks, leading up to the release of his Believe theatrical film, which saw a limited one-week release on Christmas Day 2013. Each of the singles released has its own original artwork, featuring a white and purple theme. The first song issued during "Music Mondays", as Bieber had touted the weekly releases, "Heartbreaker", was issued on October 7, 2013. The song reached the top of the Denmark charts, the top-ten in other three countries and peaked inside the top-twenty on the US Billboard Hot 100, the UK Singles Chart and other five territories. The second song, "All That Matters", was released on October 14, 2013, and was the first to receive a music video treatment, released on December 2, 2013. It was another number-one single in Denmark, while reaching the top-twenty in eight countries, including the United Kingdom. In the United States, it reached number 24. "Hold Tight" was the third, released on October 21, 2013, and also his third consecutive number-one in Denmark; elsewhere it reached the top-forty in over ten countries, followed by "Recovery" and "Bad Day", released on October 28, 2013, and November 4, 2013, respectively, with both reaching the top-forty in many countries, while the latter becoming the album's fourth number-one single in Denmark. The other five subsequent singles, "All Bad", "PYD", "Roller Coaster", "Change Me" and "Confident", were released each a week and attained moderate impact on the charts worldwide, with "Roller Coaster" and "Confident" also reaching the top of Denmark charts, and the latter also receiving a music video treatment.

On December 9, 2013, Bieber announced that the ten Music Monday releases would be packaged with an additional five new songs in a compilation titled Complete My Journals. Although the album was initially set for release on December 16, 2013, the date was pushed back one week to December 23, as Bieber intended to include one more song on the compilation. Journals was available on iTunes from January 2, 2014, and all sixteen songs are available for purchase individually. The track "Flatline" was available for a free download on the iTunes Store for a limited time, and was included as a bonus track on the Spotify edition. According to one of its producers, Jason "Poo Bear" Boyd, the label did not support the album because it wasn't the direction they wanted Justin to go. It was initially only released digitally, but was eventually released on LP in 2016.

== Commercial performance ==
In April 2026, following Bieber's headlining Coachella performance, Journals debuted at number 111 on the US Billboard 200 with nearly 13,000 album-equivalent units.

== Critical reception ==
Professional ratings
Review scores
Source	Rating
Absolute Punk	(6.6/10)
Chicago Tribune	2/4 stars
Fact	3.5/5 stars
The Los Angeles Times	3/4 stars
Milwaukee Journal Sentinel	(mixed)
New York Daily News	3/5 stars
Newsday	B-
Spin	(positive)
Toronto Star	2.5/4 stars
The Washington Post	(negative)

Journals met with lukewarm reviews, with most music critics noting his artistic growth. In a positive review, Mikael Wood of Los Angeles Times praised the "tunes that take up his evolving reputation with surprising candor" as well as the fact that "he's using that voice to confront the awkward aging-in-public process head-on." He also called the album "a come-to-Jesus moment that has nothing to do with Christmas." Jim Farber of New York Daily News noted that Journals "has a cohesion nowhere evident on the Bieb’s three previous studio CDs," while also praising the album for "find[ing] an energy in Bieber’s deepening personality" and the music that "finds him more fully engaged." Aimee Cliff wrote for Fact that the album is "a resounding achievement" and "trumps at every turn with its secret weapon: subtlety," while Brandon Soderberg of Spin called it "a cohesive, well-paced collection of narcotic R&B," claiming that the album's "elegance is conveyed via denser production choices and our host’s artful crooning." Ben Rayner of Toronto Star applauded Bieber's voice, calling it "sufficiently well suited to the material that he can almost sell his new persona." Rayner also acknowledged that " tunes are often surprisingly interesting from a production standpoint," however he pointed out that "there’s too much of the same."

Niko John of Absolute Punk went on to write that "'Journals' is undoubtedly his greatest work to date and shows a more mature, sexual side to the Canadian pop-star. However, it is an experiment that at times works and at others feels like Bieber is trying way too hard to discard his boy image." Sandeep Singh of Verdens Gang wrote that Journals is "neither a profound diary or a studio album it could have been [...] But this is undoubtedly the best Bieber has bubbled up to now." The Washington Post's Allison Stewart offered a negative outlook on the project, writing that "Justin Bieber ends a bad year with a bad album." In his review written for the Milwaukee Journal Sentinel, Piet Levy wrote that Bieber is "less an eager child than a confident adult, although when Bieber's flat come-ons are juxtaposed with seasoned R&B star R. Kelly on "PYD," it's clear that as a performer, he still has a lot of growing up to do."

== Track listing ==
Journals track listing
No.	Title	Writer(s)	Producer(s)	Length
1.	"Heartbreaker"	Justin Bieber; Brandon Green; Tyler Williams; Tony Scales; Xavier Smith	Bieber; Maejor Ali; T-Minus; Chef Tone	4:21
2.	"All That Matters"	Bieber; Jason Boyd; Andre Harris; Donovan Knight	Bieber; Harris; D.K. the Punisher^{[a]}	3:08
3.	"Hold Tight"	Bieber; Dominic Jordan; Jimmy Giannos; Boyd; Jamal Rashid	The Audibles; Poo Bear^{[a]}; Mally Mall^{[a]}	4:15
4.	"Recovery"	Bieber; Jordan; Giannos; Boyd; Rashid; Craig David; Mark Hill	The Audibles; Poo Bear^{[a]}; Mally Mall^{[a]}	3:00
5.	"Bad Day"	Bieber; Jordan; Giannos; Boyd; Rashid; Ernest Isley; Marvin Isley; O'Kelly Isley Jr.; Ronald Isley; Rudolph Isley; Christopher Jasper	The Audibles; Poo Bear^{[a]}; Mally Mall^{[a]}	2:26
6.	"All Bad"	Bieber; Harris; Boyd; Ryan Toby	Harris; Poo Bear^{[a]}	3:01
7.	"PYD" (featuring R. Kelly)	Bieber; Robert Kelly; Sasha Sirota; Jordan; Giannos; Boyd; Rashid	Sirota; The Audibles; Poo Bear^{[a]}; Mally Mall^{[a]}	5:17
8.	"Roller Coaster"	Bieber; Rodney Jerkins; Julian Swirsky; Joshua Gudwin	Darkchild; Julkeyz	3:20
9.	"Change Me"	Bieber; Harris; Boyd	Harris	2:43
10.	"Confident" (featuring Chance the Rapper)	Bieber; Chancelor Bennett; Kenneth Coby; Maurice Simmonds	Soundz	4:07
11.	"One Life"	Bieber; Green; Scales	Maejor Ali; Chef Tone	4:02
12.	"Backpack" (featuring Lil Wayne)	Bieber; Dwayne Carter, Jr.; Nasri Atweh; Adam Messinger; Adrian Eccleston	The Messengers; Sir Nolan; Kuk Harrell^{[b]}	4:11
13.	"What's Hatnin'" (featuring Future)	Bieber; Nayvadius Wilburn; Coby	Soundz	3:28
14.	"Swap It Out"	Bieber; Jordan; Giannos; Boyd	The Audibles; Poo Bear	4:01
15.	"Memphis" (featuring Big Sean)	Bieber; Sean Anderson; Friedrich Moritz; Thomas Pentz; Green	Diplo; Maejor Ali^{[a]}	3:43
Total length:				55:03

Journals — Spotify edition bonus track
No.	Title	Writer(s)	Producer(s)	Length
16.	"Flatline"	Bieber; Coby; Gudwin	Soundz; Josh Gudwin	3:39
Total length:				58:43

Journals — 2023 expanded edition vinyl bonus track
No.	Title	Length
17.	"Alone"	2:22
Total length:		61:05

Journals — Amazon Music edition
No.	Title	Length
16.	"All That Matters" (music video)	3:40
Total length:		58:43

Journals — iTunes Store edition (bonus videos)
No.	Title	Length
16.	"All That Matters" (music video)	3:40
17.	"Believe"	2:23
18.	"Guatemala Pencils of Promise Journal"	3:02
Total length:		64:08

Notes

- ^{^a} signifies a co-producer.
- ^{^b} signifies a vocal producer.
- "Recovery" contains samples of "Fill Me In", written by Craig David and Mark Hill.
- "Bad Day" contains samples of "Footsteps in the Dark", written by Ernest Isley, Marvin Isley, O'Kelly Isley Jr., Ronald Isley, Rudolph Isley and Christopher Jasper.
- "Memphis" contains samples of "Nights Off", written by Friedrich Moritz.

== Charts ==
=== Weekly charts ===
2013 weekly chart performance
Chart (2013)	Peak position
Australian Albums (ARIA)	35
Belgian Albums (Ultratop Flanders)	27
Belgian Albums (Ultratop Wallonia)	54
Danish Albums (Hitlisten)	2
Finnish Albums (Suomen virallinen lista)	33
French Albums (SNEP)	174
Irish Albums (IRMA)	64
Italian Albums (FIMI)	38
Norwegian Albums (VG-lista)	2
UK Albums (Official Charts)	46
UK R&B Albums (Official Charts)	3

2026 weekly chart performance
Chart (2026)	Peak position
Canadian Albums (Billboard)	71
Dutch Albums (Album Top 100)	68
US Billboard 200	78

=== Year-end charts ===
2013 year-end chart performance
Chart (2013)	Position
Danish Albums (Hitlisten)	78

== Certifications ==
Certifications
Region	Certification	Certified units/sales
Denmark (IFPI Danmark)	Platinum	20,000^{‡}
New Zealand (RMNZ)	Gold	7,500^{‡}
United Kingdom (BPI)	Silver	60,000^{‡}
United States (RIAA)	Platinum	1,000,000^{‡}
^{‡} Sales+streaming figures based on certification alone.

== Release history ==
Release dates and formats
Country	Date	Format	Label	Ref.
Canada	December 23, 2013	Digital download	The Island Def Jam Music Group	
United States	December 23, 2013	Digital download	The Island Def Jam Music Group	
United States	February 12, 2016	LP	Universal Music Enterprises	
Canada	February 26, 2016	LP	Universal Music Enterprises	
Germany	March 25, 2016	LP	Universal Music Enterprises	
France	March 25, 2016	LP	Universal Music Enterprises	
Italy	March 25, 2016	LP	Universal Music Enterprises	
United Kingdom	March 25, 2016	LP	Universal Music Enterprises	
Spain	April 1, 2016	LP	Universal Music Enterprises	
