= The Audibles =

Pop music, Record producer duo

- Origin: Los Angeles, California; Las Vegas, Nevada, U.S.
- Genres: Pop; hip hop; R&B; EDM
- Years active: 2007–present
- Label: Track Team LLC
- Members: Dominic "DJ Mecca" Jordan; Jimmy "Jimmy G" Giannos
- Website: TheAudiblesMusic.com

The Audibles is an American pop and hip hop production duo from Las Vegas, Nevada, consisting of Dominic "DJ Mecca" Jordan and Jimmy "Jimmy G" Giannos. They originally met in 2007 at the “Lost in Love” music video shoot for Polow Da Don artists I-15 at the Palms Casino in Paradise, Nevada. They coined their name The Audibles from its root definition “to be heard” and “to change the game,” as seen by quarterbacks in football. JR Castro and Das offered an opportunity for the two to move to Atlanta and develop their art further under producer Polow Da Don.

They have produced songs for artists like Keyshia Cole, Chris Brown, YMCMB, Fabolous and Usher. More recent work includes songs for Justin Bieber, Kanye West, Trey Songz, Drake, and Rihanna.

== Career ==
=== Rise to success ===
The first major production by The Audibles came with Interscope recording artist Mishon's "Turn it Up" in 2009, featuring Roscoe Dash. The song reached #80 on the Billboard Hot 100 and was the first time the duo received widespread attention. They also co-produced Young Money's third single “Girl I Got You” with Mr. Pyro on YMCMB’s first album entitled We Are Young Money. Through their partnership with Jason “Poo Bear” Boyd, the duo went on to create records for Redman, including Redman Presents...Reggie; a track from this album, “Lite 1 Witcha Boi”, featuring Method Man and Bun B, became an instant cult hip-hop classic.

=== 2010-2020 ===
In 2012, The Audibles worked with Lupe Fiasco on his single Bitch Bad for his album Lupe Fiasco's Food & Liquor II: The Great American Rap Album Pt. 1. They also teamed up with Poo Bear to work on his R&B album BEATS 2 BREAK UP 2, which they did almost all the production for (aside from “Made You Break Up With Me”, which was produced by Mr. Pyro).

In 2013, they worked with French Montana and were in the studio with Justin Bieber to produce six records off of his journal album. Bad Day, Recovery, PYD, Swap It Out, Alone, and Hold Tight were all released as singles.

In 2014, the duo took a hiatus, during which they traveled extensively and performed humanitarian work. In that same year they released a record entitled Julius Caesar with the artist French Montana and produced five songs on Poo Bear's BEATS 2 MAKE LOVE 2.

In 2015, The Audibles returned to the studio and worked on several songs with Justin Bieber and Poo Bear for Bieber's fourth album, Purpose. Out of the songs, "No Pressure" was released as a single featuring Big Sean. They also contributed to Chris Brown's seventh studio album, Royalty, by producing the song "Little More (Royalty)," for which the music video was released on December 18, 2015. They teamed back up with their childhood friend JR Castro to work on his debut EP, for which they co-produced a single with DJ Mustard entitled "Get Home", featuring Kid Ink and Quavo.

In 2016, The Audibles produced JR Castro's summer hit "Right Away", which came as a follow-up after the latter received an award for "Get Home" the previous year. The duo also produced for Mary J. Blige, Trey Songz, and Mike Posner. In addition, they received their first Triple Platinum plaque for the No Pressure record off Justin Bieber's album Purpose.

In 2017, The Audibles were nominees for album of the year at the Grammy Awards for Justin Bieber's Purpose. They also produced a song entitled "Famous" on the album Beach House 3 by Ty Dolla Sign, and wrote the song "Burning" for Sam Smith's The Thirll of It All. The same year, Common Kings released their debut album, Lost In Paradise, which was produced nearly in its entirety by The Audibles. The duo also began working on the debut album of their artist, LAZR.

In 2018, DJ Mecca and Jimmy G received another Grammy nomination for Best Reggae Album with the Common Kings. In February of that year, they released LAZR's debut single, entitled Schemin.

=== 2020-present ===
In January 2020, The Audibles teamed back up with long-time collaborator Justin Bieber on his fifth studio album entitled Changes. They produced four songs on the album: "Intentions" feat. Quavo, "Come Around Me", "Running Over" feat. Lil Dicky, and "Second Emotion" feat. Travis Scott. Intentions was later released as Bieber's second single, to critical acclaim. The song stayed in the top 10 on Billboard Hot 100 for 22 weeks, peaking at number one on Billboard radio charts Mainstream Top 40. In March 2020, Variety labeled The Audibles the "Hitmaker Of The Month" for their work on Changes.

In the same year, the duo were executive producers of LAZR's debut album Blawsome with Phil Ivey, Illya Trencher, and Chris Gotti. They produced all songs on the album except "Seattle." Although every song on the project stands on its own, "Bestfriend" became one of the album's highlights because of its signature "Audible's Sound" mix with LAZR's top line.

During the COVID-19 pandemic, The Audibles pivoted into releasing their own music. Do Cool Sh!t With Your Friends is the title of their debut album, which sums up their signature sound. "UP" Feat. Poo Bear became their first release under their new distribution company, NOTOMORO. The record was an indie success and an introduction to what their own style consists of. Their second single, SOON AS I feat. Sab Story P/K/A STORY was released on October 20, 2020, and became immensely popular with club DJs. Their next single OUTRAGEOUS feat. Sebastian Reynoso, was also released the same year. In May 2020, they collaborated with Chris Brown and Young Thug for the a track on their joint project Slime & B, entitled "City Girls".

In 2021, The Audibles have been focusing on breaking new talent, including LAZR, Sebastian Reynoso, Samantha Free, and Savannah Bleu. They also focused on branding their new music distribution platform, NOTOMORO, which helps up-and-coming stars aggregate and release their music to all streaming platforms.
