= RBMG =

American record label

- Parent company: HarbourView Equity Partners
- Founded: 2008
- Founder: Usher Raymond; Scooter Braun
- Distributors: Def Jam; Universal
- Genre: Pop, R&B, hip hop, dance
- Country of origin: United States
- Official website: www.scooterbraun.com

Raymond Braun Media Group (RBMG) is an American record label founded by R&B singer Usher Raymond and talent manager Scooter Braun in 2008 as a joint venture. The label was initially created for both parties to jointly manage the career and recording catalogue of then-rising teen pop singer Justin Bieber. In 2022, HarbourView Equity Partners acquired the label.

== History ==
Raymond and Braun founded RBMG Music in 2008, in conjunction with Island Def Jam, to debut teen singer Justin Bieber. Bieber's debut extended play, My World, was the label's first release. It peaked at number five on the Billboard 200, and received platinum certification by the Recording Industry Association of America by March 2010; it has since received triple platinum certification. The label's second release and Bieber's debut studio album, My World 2.0 (2010), peaked atop the Billboard 200, received quadruple platinum certification in the U.S., and was nominated for Best Pop Vocal Album at the 53rd Annual Grammy Awards.

In September 2022, HarbourView Equity Partners acquired RBMG, for an amount estimated at $40 million.

== Former artist ==
- Justin Bieber

== Discography ==
Artist	Album	Details
Justin Bieber	My World (released with Schoolboy and Teen Island)	Released: November 17, 2009; Chart position: #1 U.S.; RIAA certification: 3× Platinum
Justin Bieber	My World 2.0 (released with Schoolboy and Teen Island)	Released: March 23, 2010; Chart position: #1 U.S.; RIAA certification: 4× Platinum
Justin Bieber	My Worlds: The Collection (released with Schoolboy and Teen Island)	Released: November 19, 2010; Chart position: –; RIAA certification: Gold
Justin Bieber	My Worlds Acoustic (released with Schoolboy and Teen Island)	Released: November 26, 2010; Chart position: #7 U.S.; RIAA certification: Gold
Justin Bieber	Never Say Never: The Remixes (released with Schoolboy and Teen Island)	Released: February 14, 2011; Chart position: #1 U.S.; RIAA certification: Platinum
Justin Bieber	Under the Mistletoe	Released: November 1, 2011; Chart position: #1 U.S.; RIAA certification: 2× Platinum
Justin Bieber	Believe (released with Schoolboy)	Released: June 15, 2012; Chart position: #1 U.S.; RIAA certification: 3× Platinum
Justin Bieber	Believe Acoustic (released with Schoolboy)	Released: January 29, 2013; Chart position: #1 U.S.; RIAA certification: Gold
Justin Bieber	Journals (released with Schoolboy)	Released: December 23, 2013; Chart position: –; RIAA certification: Gold
Justin Bieber	Purpose (released with Def Jam)	Released: November 13, 2015; Chart position: #1 U.S.; RIAA certification: 5× Platinum
Justin Bieber	Changes (released with Def Jam)	Released: February 14, 2020; Chart position: #1 U.S.; RIAA certification: Platinum
Justin Bieber	Justice (released with Def Jam)	Released: March 19, 2021; Chart position: #1 U.S.; RIAA certification: Platinum
