= Hold Tight (Justin Bieber song) =

Single by Justin Bieber

from the album Journals
- Released: October 21, 2013
- Recorded: June 4, 2013
- Studio: The Hit Factory (Miami, Florida)
- Genre: R&B
- Length: 4:14
- Label: Island
- Songwriters: Justin Bieber; Dominic Jordan; Jimmy Giannos; Jason Boyd; Jamal Rashid
- Producer: The Audibles

Justin Bieber singles chronology
| "All That Matters" (2013) | "Hold Tight" (2013) | "Wait for a Minute" (2013) |

Lyric video
- "Hold Tight" on YouTube

"Hold Tight" is a song recorded by Canadian singer Justin Bieber for his second compilation album Journals (2013). It was released on 21 October 2013, as the third single from Bieber's series Music Mondays, following "Heartbreaker" and "All That Matters" (released on October 7 and 14, respectively).

== Background and release ==
On 17 October 2013, Bieber announced the release of "Hold Tight" via his Instagram account. In the posting, he revealed the artwork for the single and announced that it would be released on 21 October. Of the song's concept, Bieber explained: "I am a hopeless romantic so when I love someone, I never want to let them go. This song is about the rush you get when you have that feeling. No matter how hard you try, you can’t let that person go. You just want to hold on as tight as you can. I tried to capture that with this one." The songwriter of "Hold Tight", Jason "Poo Bear" Boyd, revealed in an interview with Joe Coscarelli of The New York Times, that he had been skeptical about collaborating with Bieber for "Hold Tight".

Justin wanted 'Grip Tight,' a pulsing, dirty club track that I had prepared for my own solo project. I told Mr. Bieber: "You’re 18, and it’s a very sexual song. You can’t go from singing 'Beauty and a Beat’ to ‘Grip Tight’ ", but evidently nobody ever told him no. We just got closer and closer. Then a light bulb switched in my head, and I was like, wait a minute, I’m a songwriter — I can always write more songs.

Jason Boyd changed "Grip Tight" to "Hold Tight", and the song became their first collaboration.

== Composition ==
"Hold Tight" is a mid-tempo R&B song. Lyrically, Bieber describes the "addictive power" of a woman's lips. Mikael Wood of the Los Angeles Times noted that "Hold on Tight" could possibly be addressing his on-again/off-again relationship with Selena Gomez. Jason Lipshutz of Billboard wrote that Bieber "sorrowfully delivers each syllable".

== Critical response ==
Professional ratings
Review scores
| Source | Rating |
|---|---|
| HitFix | C |

The song was met with generally mixed reviews. On a more unfavorable review Melinda Newman of HitFix criticized the fact that it has "no change in tempo" and opinioned that Bieber’s delivery seems forced. She concluded that "if you’re a Bieber fan who dreams of getting your boy in a lip lock, this song will probably work for you".

== Music video ==
On 1 January 2014, Justin Bieber released a video for "Hold Tight" via his YouTube channel. The video features concert footage of Bieber performing "One Less Lonely Girl" to the live audience during his Believe Tour in Asia. When Bieber performs the song with the musical background, he invites one or two girls on stage to be the object of his affection or the "lonely girl" during the performance. He holds their hands and hugs them tight while they are both on stage.

== Live performances ==
Bieber performed the song on the acoustic guitar with Dan Kanter at the 2015 Wango Tango and on the French television for Le Grand Journal (Canal+). Moreover, "Hold Tight" was also included on the set list for the Purpose World Tour.

== Charts ==
| Chart (2013) | Peak position |
|---|---|
| Australia (ARIA) | 48 |
| Austria (Ö3 Austria Top 40) | 40 |
| Belgium (Ultratop 50 Flanders) | 23 |
| Belgium Urban (Ultratop Flanders) | 5 |
| Belgium (Ultratop 50 Wallonia) | 29 |
| Canada Hot 100 (Billboard) | 23 |
| Denmark (Tracklisten) | 1 |
| France (SNEP) | 46 |
| Germany (GfK) | 56 |
| Netherlands (Single Top 100) | 14 |
| Spain (Promusicae) | 19 |
| Switzerland (Schweizer Hitparade) | 25 |
| UK Singles (Official Charts) | 28 |
| US Billboard Hot 100 | 29 |

== Certifications ==
| Region | Certification | Certified units/sales |
|---|---|---|
| Brazil (Pro-Música Brasil) | Gold | 30,000^{‡} |
| United States (RIAA) | Gold | 500,000^{‡} |
^{‡} Sales+streaming figures based on certification alone.

== Release history ==
| Country | Date | Format | Label |
|---|---|---|---|
| United States | October 21, 2013 | Digital download | Island |
