= All That Matters (Justin Bieber song) =

2013 single by Justin Bieber

Single by Justin Bieber

from the album Journals
- Released: October 14, 2013
- Recorded: 2013
- Studio: Henson Recording Studios (Hollywood, Los Angeles)
- Genre: R&B
- Length: 3:11
- Label: Island
- Songwriters: Justin Bieber; Jason Boyd; Andre Harris; Donovan Knight
- Producers: Justin Bieber; Andre Harris

Justin Bieber singles chronology
"Heartbreaker" (2013)	"All That Matters" (2013)	"Hold Tight" (2013)

Music video
- "All That Matters" on YouTube

"All That Matters" is a song by Canadian singer Justin Bieber from his second compilation album, Journals (2013). The song was produced by D.K. the Punisher, Andre Harris and Bieber, all of whom served as songwriters alongside Poo Bear. Bieber wrote it to show the way someone you love can make you feel, conveying love as a feeling of high importance. After he teased the song on October 10, 2013, it was released as the second single of the album and Music Mondays on October 14, through Island Records.

An R&B ballad and love song with elements of blues, the instrumentation includes acoustic guitar. "All That Matters" received positive reviews from music critics, who generally praised the love song style. They often highlighted Bieber's vocal development, while some critics made favorable comparisons to "Heartbreaker". The song debuted at number 14 on the Canadian Hot 100, while reaching number one in Denmark and the top 20 in seven other countries. It peaked at number 24 on the US Billboard Hot 100, and was certified platinum in the United States by the Recording Industry Association of America (RIAA).

An accompanying lyric video was released on October 18, 2013, mostly showing the lyrics in black-and-white alongside geometric symbols. On December 2, the song's music video was debuted, depicting Bieber and Cailin Russo as a couple. Multiple colours illuminate the couple as they showcase their love and Bieber shows off to Rosso. He performed "All That Matters" at both KIIS-FM's Wango Tango concert and the Billboard Hot 100 Music Festival in 2015.

== Background and conception ==
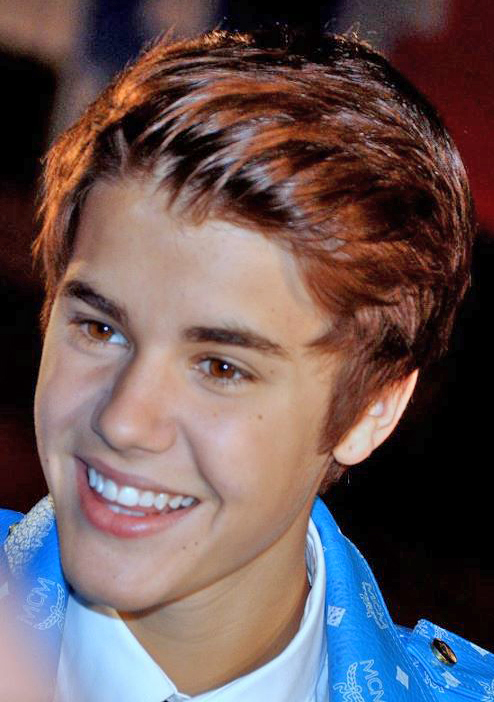
Bieber repeatedly explained that the song represents him falling in love.

Prior to working with Bieber, American songwriter Poo Bear had written songs for acts such as 112, Pink, Usher, and Kelly Rowland. Poo Bear said that they connected heavily due to having many mutual feelings and their lives outside of music had parallels, both having "grew up in really religious, single-parent homes, not having a lot". The songwriter recalled that he "would catch people listening to 'All That Matters'" with embarrassment as a Bieber record, yet they became found enough "that once they found out who it was it was too late" and he had new listeners. Bieber and Andre Harris produced the song, with co-production from D.K. the Punisher; the producers co-wrote it with Poo Bear.

On October 10, 2013, Bieber announced the release of "All That Matters" by sharing a photo and the title on Instagram. Three days later, the song leaked online 12 hours before its scheduled release. "All That Matters" was released on October 14, 2013, as part of Bieber's promotional series Music Mondays that ran for 10 weeks in the lead-up to Journals. In comparison to the series' previous single "Heartbreaker", the song has a less conventional R&B style.

In the iTunes description of "All That Matters", Bieber summarized that the lyrics are self-explanatory; "when you fall in love with someone, that someone can make you feel whole". He elaborated that anyone who has experienced love should understand how it conveys this as one of the greatest feelings achievable and "all that matters", yet the void felt afterwards "is gut-wrenching" and he worked his hardest to channel the feeling of love. Speaking to Power 106 in December 2013, Bieber confirmed that the song was written when he was "in a great place" Bieber opened up that he conveyed his emotion and love on the song, explaining the couple's break-up affected them both heavily, particularly with the public spotlight.

== Composition and lyrics ==
Musically, "All That Matters" is a mid-tempo R&B ballad and love song, with blues elements. The instrumentation is reliant on strums of acoustic guitar, a lush bass, and a drum beat. Percussion is included alongside the acoustic notes, going against the traditional style of R&B. A steady pace is maintained throughout the song, while Bieber lowers his vocal register on instances such as the hook.

In the lyrics of "All That Matters", Bieber sings about someone being all that matters for him. On the hook, Bieber croons to his lover "you're all that matters to me". He also belts out the question, "What's a king bed without a queen?" Bieber asserts his gratefulness for her existence and that from the bottom of his heart, she is the only girl he sees.

== Release and promotion ==
On October 14, 2013, "All That Matters" was released as the second single for the album and Music Mondays, coinciding with Canadian Thanksgiving. The song subsequently topped the iTunes charts of multiple countries, such as the United States, Brazil, and Denmark. Bieber celebrated this success over Twitter, thanking all of the listeners. In December 2013, the song received airplay on rap radio stations in New York. "All That Matters" was later included as the second track of Bieber's second compilation album Journals on December 23, 2013.

A clip for the song accompanied its release on October 15, 2013. The clip was filmed on Bieber's visit to China for his Believe Tour (2012–13), and shot by American director Alfredo Flores. Bieber appears atop the Great Wall of China, singing, dancing, cradling a baby, and embracing his fans. His outfit consists of a white shirt, chain, baseball cap, and sunglasses. On October 18, 2013, Bieber shared an accompanying lyric video. The minimal video relies on a black-and-white style for the lyrics, accompanied by geometric symbols. Occasional hints of purple break up the style and when Bieber sings the "king bed" line, a bed appears.

== Critical reception ==
"All That Matters" was met with positive reviews from music critics, with general praise for the love song style. Writing for Billboard, Jason Lipshutz put forward that the song may be less traditional to R&B than "Heartbreaker", yet it is "even more heart-wrenching". He specified that at points, Bieber "intensely belts, with the sound of anguish in his young voice". On a similar note, MTV's Jocelyn Vena said that like its predecessor, "All That Matters" "veers a bit into sexy musical territory" of singers like Miguel and the Weeknd. He also noted that Bieber's vocals are accompanied by "a thumping mid-tempo beat" and he continues crafting R&B works, showing a newfound maturity in the lyrics. At Fact, Aimee Cliff described the "super smooth" single as largely similar to "Heartbreaker", holding back more than Bieber has ever attempted and drawing attention to his intense vocals that change their register over the instrumentation.

The staff of Fuse thought that with "All That Matters", Bieber "continues playing the role of Lothario heartthrob" through Music Mondays. Amy Sciarretto from PopCrush saw the song as "a smooth, slow and sincere, '90s-influenced R&B lament" about Bieber's typical subject of love and observed a deliberately steady pace maintained throughout, concluding that it is "a warm and comforting love song". The staff of Vibe called the song a "sweet serenade", noting an appeal to women. For the Los Angeles Times, Mikael Wood believed that the bluesy song indicated Bieber using Music Mondays "to experiment with different moods and textures", and feels like part of "an impressively unified whole" on the album.

== Music video ==
Bieber posted a behind-the-scenes photo from the set of the music video for "All That Matters" to Instagram on November 19, 2013, showing him close up with a blonde woman. On December 2, Bieber tweeted that the music video would be released that day at 7.p.m. and added "a lot of things u aren't expecting are happening this month". Bieber used a series of tweets to lead up to the release that was on schedule, and the video was directed by American director Colin Tilley. It marked the first music video for a Music Mondays song and was simultaneous with the release of the series' single "Change Me".

The music video features dim lighting, beginning with blue that illuminates Bieber and model Cailin Russo, who plays his lover. The couple are depicted afront an old film projector as Bieber wears a long shirt and leather Rick Owens skinny jeans with an attached kilt, while Russo rocks a denim crop top and Timberland leather hotpants. They are illuminated by blue, red, and yellow colours throughout the video, with the third being prominent for them making out. Scenes of Bieber performing "All That Matters" are interspersed with him seducing Russo, using the likes of ice and a guitar. A shiny motorcycle appears, which the couple make a pose on top of. Bieber wears a Saint Laurent Sumi Ink Club motorcycle jacket at one point that is accompanied by a second set of jeans with an attachment and Givenchy gold-plated sneakers, while he mostly walks around shirtless to show off his body. For the conclusion, Bieber and Russo engage in a passionate kiss.

== Commercial performance ==
In Canada, the song debuted at number 14 on the Canadian Hot 100 and only lasted for a week. Upon release, "All That Matters" peaked at number 24 on the US Billboard Hot 100. The song spent eight weeks on the Hot 100. On June 25, 2020, seven years after being released, it was certified platinum by the Recording Industry Association of America (RIAA) for pushing 1,000,000 certified units in the US.

Elsewhere, the song was most successful in Denmark, topping the Danish Track Top-40. On March 14, 2014, "All That Matters" was awarded a gold streaming certification by IFPI Danmark for amassing 900,000 streamed units in the country. It reached number 11 on the Netherlands' Dutch Single Top 100, while peaking at number 14 in both Ireland and Norway. The song also attained top 20 positions in Spain, Switzerland, Italy, and the United Kingdom. It charted within the top 40 in Austria, New Zealand, and France.

== Live performances ==
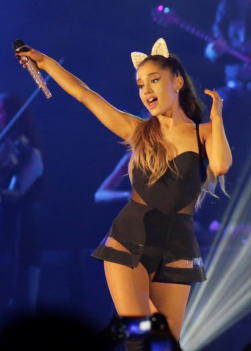
Bieber provided a performance of the song in Miami on Ariana Grande's Honeymoon Tour, with additional vocals from her.

On March 28, 2015, American singer Ariana Grande brought Bieber on stage as a special guest for a concert at the American Airlines Center in Miami on The Honeymoon Tour. During his appearance, Bieber performed "All That Matters" with vocal assistance from Grande on a few parts, generating a positive reaction from the crowd. He sang a rendition of it for KIIS-FM's 2015 Wango Tango concert at the StubHub Center in Carson, California, sitting down and performing in sync after previously being off-key. Bieber performed the song at that year's inaugural Billboard Hot 100 Music Festival, resting on a stool alongside an accompanying guitarist that contributed acoustic licks. While Bieber performed, the lights were dimmed per his request and he gripped a white towel, using it to mop the stage.

On September 28, 2015, Bieber performed the song during a concert at Fox FM's World Famous Rooftop in Melbourne. Two days later, he performed an acoustic version for his concert at Cockatoo Island in Sydney Harbour, a site named "Bieber Island" for this occasion. He delivered a performance in the same style during a concert for The Edge to 150 competition winners at the Tyler Street Garage Bar in Auckland on October 1, 2015. Bieber performed the song during his livestream concert of Journals for TikTok at the Beverly Hilton in Beverly Hills, California on February 14, 2021. This coincided with Valentine's Day and as he performed, a five-piece band and a team of dancers accompanied Bieber, with backing from a light show on the newly-designed stage.

== Charts ==
Chart performance for "All That Matters"
Chart (2013)	Peak position
Australia (ARIA)	41
Austria (Ö3 Austria Top 40)	34
Belgium (Ultratop 50 Flanders)	19
Belgium (Ultratop 50 Wallonia)	28
Canada Hot 100 (Billboard)	14
Denmark (Tracklisten)	1
France (SNEP)	40
Germany (GfK)	46
Ireland (IRMA)	14
Italy (FIMI)	19
Netherlands (Single Top 100)	11
New Zealand (Recorded Music NZ)	37
Norway (VG-lista)	14
Spain (Promusicae)	16
Switzerland (Schweizer Hitparade)	17
UK Singles (Official Charts)	20
US Billboard Hot 100	24

== Certifications ==
Certifications for "All That Matters"
Region	Certification	Certified units/sales
Australia (ARIA)	Platinum	70,000^{‡}
Brazil (Pro-Música Brasil)	Diamond	250,000^{‡}
New Zealand (RMNZ)	Platinum	30,000^{‡}
United Kingdom (BPI)	Silver	200,000^{‡}
United States (RIAA)	Platinum	1,000,000^{‡}
Streaming
Denmark (IFPI Danmark)	Gold	900,000^{†}
^{‡} Sales+streaming figures based on certification alone.^{†} Streaming-only figures based on certification alone.
