= Heartbreaker (Justin Bieber song) =

Single by Justin Bieber

from the album Journals
- Released: October 7, 2013
- Recorded: February 26, 2013
- Studio: The Langham Hotel (London, United Kingdom)
- Genre: R&B
- Length: 4:22
- Label: Island
- Songwriters: Justin Bieber; Brandon Green; Tyler Williams; Tony Scales; Xavier Smith
- Producers: Justin Bieber; Maejor Ali; T-Minus; Chef Tone

Justin Bieber singles chronology
"Lolly" (2013)	"Heartbreaker" (2013)	"All That Matters" (2013)

Audio video
- "Heartbreaker" on YouTube

"Heartbreaker" is a song by Canadian singer Justin Bieber from his second compilation album, Journals (2013). The song was produced by Bieber, Maejor Ali, T-Minus, and Chef Tone, who served as co-writers with Xavier Smith. Bieber penned the song in 2013 on his Believe Tour, writing it for people going through a heartbreak as he was at the time. After announcing the song on June 3, 2013, the singer shared a preview on July 19. It was released for digital download and streaming as the lead single for the album and the first in Bieber's Music Mondays series on October 7, 2013, through Island Records. An acoustic R&B ballad with elements of pop, it prominently features an emo melody and chords.

Lyrically, the song sees Bieber offering his outlook on love and trying to reunite with an ex-lover. Multiple authors thought that the song was about Selena Gomez. "Heartbreaker" received generally positive reviews from music critics, who mostly noted its emotional appeal. Some highlighted Bieber's maturity and artistic growth, while other reviewers praised the musical style. The song charted at number 15 on the Canadian Hot 100, while reaching number one in Denmark and the top 10 in five other countries. It peaked at number 13 on the US Billboard Hot 100, and was certified gold in the United States by the Recording Industry Association of America (RIAA). Bieber performed the song during a livestream concert for TikTok on Valentine's Day in February 2021.

== Background ==
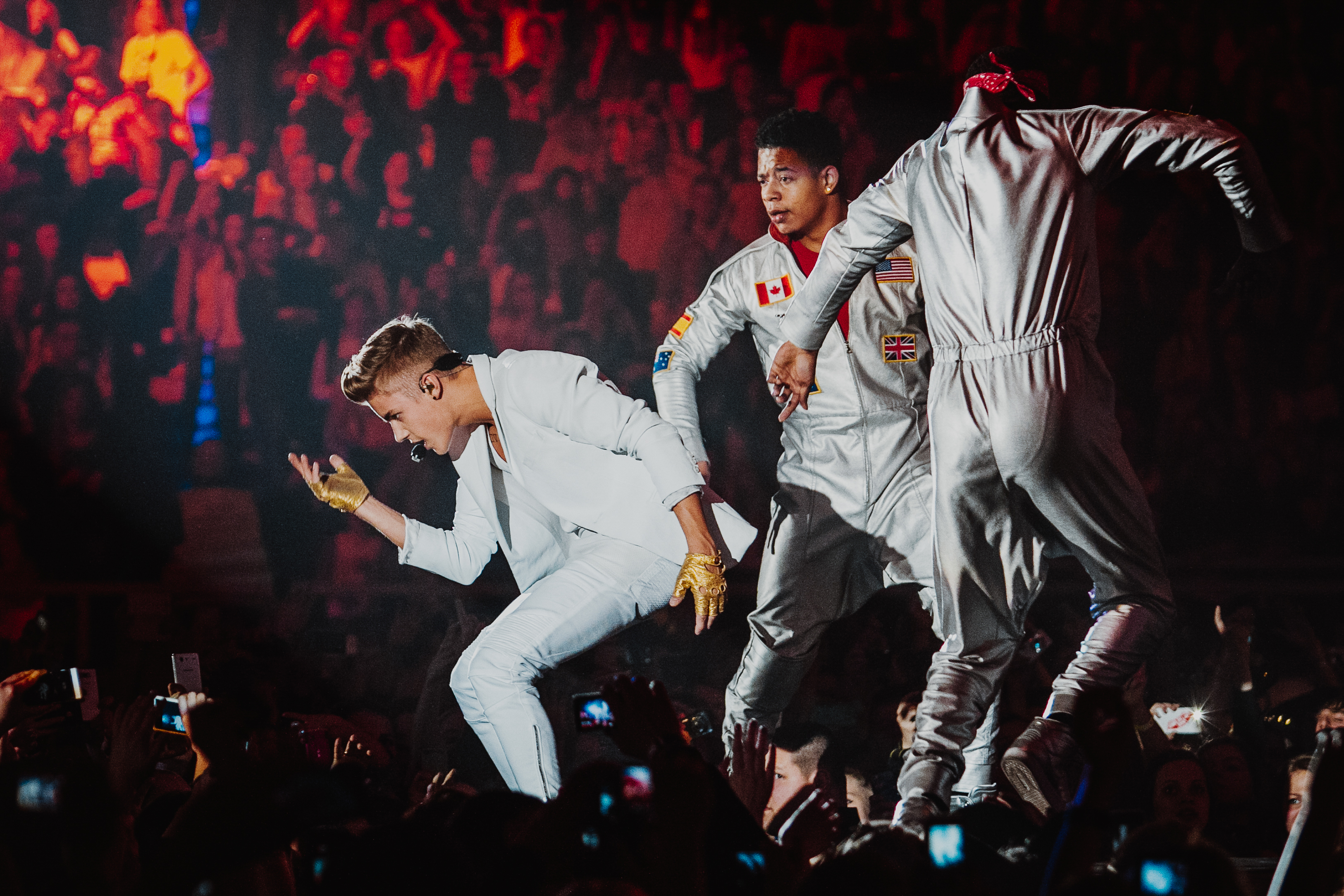
Bieber wrote the song in 2013 on his Believe Tour, dedicating it to those experiencing a heartbreak like he did.

Before collaborating with Bieber on the song, American record producer Maejor Ali had featured him on the single "Lolly" earlier in 2013. The producer recalled that he and the other contributors "got in [the studio] and zoned out" to create "Heartbreaker", saying different musical elements were added through the likes of "real harps" and guitar players; he explained that they "tried to create a masterpiece". Maejor Ali elaborated that Bieber and his team set out to convey as much honesty as possible, and "all the conversations in the studio are heard in the song". He also revealed that there was hesitancy to include the spoken-word section due to not following mainstream standards, yet the rules were abandoned for the natural feel and honesty. He produced the song with Bieber, T-Minus, and Chef Tone. Bieber wrote it while on his Believe Tour in 2013, with Maejor Ali, T-Minus, Chef Tone, and Xavier Smith serving as co-writers.

In the song's description on iTunes, Bieber wrote: "It's a song for people going through a heartbreak — like I was when I wrote it." The description also included the singer expressing pride for the song and referencing its connection to his fans; he later posted this to Twitter. Similarly, Maejor Ali said Bieber penned the song "about things he's been going through with his relationship and everything". Bieber's manager Scooter Braun believed that the song would end "the witch hunt" from his critics by silencing them, adding this would be done through him speaking for himself in a genuine and unique way. On June 3, 2013, Bieber announced on social media that the song would be released as a single shortly. He also posted the cover art, showing a crumbling purple heart in the middle with his name and the title "Heartbreaker" written around it, set to a white background. Multiple publications considered it similar to the artwork for American rapper Kanye West's 2008 album 808s & Heartbreak, which features a red heart-shaped balloon set against a blue background. On July 19, 2013, Bieber shared a 15-second video advertising his fragrance The Key via Instagram that featured him singing the song's first lines, which was posted to YouTube by his fans. "Heartbreaker" was eventually released on October 7, 2013, as part of Bieber's Music Mondays promotional series that ran for 10 weeks in the lead-up to Journals. The song marked a difference in sound from previous singles by Bieber; Braun explained that it and the record's other tracks stood out in his catalogue as "very R&B-driven, personal songs, not necessarily songs that he was thinking of as radio records", and dubbed the vocals as "pouring his heart out".

== Composition and lyrics ==
Musically, "Heartbreaker" is an acoustic R&B ballad, with elements of pop. It is also a slow jam, marking a difference in style from Bieber's usual pop driven work and his hip hop-influenced tracks. The song relies on an emo melody, and chords repeatedly appearing and disappearing over a light groove. Snare taps and chirps of "heartbreaker, heartbreaker" are also featured; the latter accompany Bieber's vocals on the chorus. The song includes a 1990s style spoken-word breakdown in the middle from Bieber, which serves as a bridge. The singer delivers another breakdown towards the end, singing in a robotic voice.

In the lyrics of "Heartbreaker", Bieber delivers his outlook on love and seeks out a second chance with a former lover. Multiple writers interpreted the song as being about American singer Selena Gomez, his ex-girlfriend. Bieber uses certain lyrics to convey his desperation for time alone and face time with a woman, desiring to look into each other's eyes. On the chorus, the singer accuses her of breaking his heart: "Don't tell me you're my heartbreaker / 'Cause, girl, my heart's breaking." The singer delivers a poem on the bridge, saying he is really trying to tell the woman and hopes she understands that "despite all the imperfections of who I am / I still wanna be your man".

== Release and reception ==
On October 7, 2013, the song was released at midnight for digital download and streaming by Island, through iTunes and Bieber's website. It stood as the lead single from the album and the first release of Music Mondays. After "Heartbreaker" topped the iTunes chart in 56 countries worldwide, Bieber tweeted in reference to its success. The track subsequently became a chart topper on the platform in 63 countries. "Heartbreaker" was eventually included as the opening track of Bieber's second compilation album Journals on December 23, 2013. The singer first performed the song during his livestream concert of the album for TikTok at the Beverly Hilton in Beverly Hills, California on February 14, 2021. This coincided with Valentine's Day and as he performed, a five-piece band and a team of dancers accompanied Bieber, with backing from a light show on the newly-designed stage.

"Heartbreaker" was met with generally positive reviews from music critics, with frequent praise for the level of emotion. Writing for Slate, Aisha Harris considered it possibly "the strongest case yet for Bieber as a mature performer" that appeals to adults as much as youngsters. Harris observed influence from "the moody stylings" of Canadian musician Drake, drawing a parallel via the "introspective, slow-burning R&B" style that "sounds as though it was beamed here straight from the '90s". She concluded that despite the song being "hardly groundbreaking stuff, it is catchy" and features Bieber's strongest vocals to date. Summarizing Bieber's performance, Teen Vogue's Casey Lewis identified him as a "dreamboat [that] shows a more vulnerable side of himself" and noted the revelational content. In Vulture, Lindsey Weber said the song should not be disregarded by any similarities to West, highlighting the melody and sadness that echo the rapper, as well as comparing it to "our currently reigning sadcore champ Drake". Mikael Wood from the Los Angeles Times praised the "moody, slow-rolling, digital-soul cut" that resembles American record producer Timbaland's productions for Ginuwine in the early 2000s and includes Bieber's voice going "full-on sad-robot" like West in a breakdown.

Entertainment Weekly's Kyle Anderson branded the song "an atmospheric slow jam" that is completed by the "'90s style spoken-word b[ridge]" and truly "wouldn't sound out of place" on singer Justin Timberlake's The 20/20 Experience (2013), which either reflects well on Bieber or indicates negatives about Timberlake, depending on your point-of-view. For Fact, Aimee Cliff wrote that "Heartbreaker" opens the album "into zero gravity", saying the chords move "in and out of focus over a low-slung groove and vocals float menacingly somewhere over your head" in a prominent production style. She appreciated how Bieber offers "a refreshingly patient take on pop" instead of "the sugar rush of pounding choruses and pseudo-Timberlake / Timbaland" of his early chart hits, thinking he showcases musical space and his voice manages "to roam and reflect around" in it. At Billboard, Jason Lipshutz said the "contemplative track" marked Bieber's "most direct" attempt at adult R&B, with the setting created by a "simple acoustic lick and snare taps", then "completed with the spoken-word breakdown" that he compared to the work of Boyz II Men. The staff of Vibe credited T-Minus, Maejor Ali, and Chef Tone for the "added strung-out emotion". Ben Rayner from the Toronto Star highlighted the production on the song's "peculiarly ominous outro" as "surprisingly interesting". In a mixed review at the Daily Record for his weekly column, Rick Fulton gave "Heartbreaker" two out of four stars and derided it as a "slow burner" that may appeal to Bieber's fans, yet "sounds old fashioned and out-dated".

== Commercial performance ==
"Heartbreaker" entered the Canadian Hot 100 at number 40 for the issue dated October 19, 2013, a week before climbing 25 places to number 15. It spent a total of two weeks on the Hot 100. The song debuted at number 77 on the US Billboard Hot 100, with 182,000 downloads in its first eight days of tracking. It leapt 64 places to number 13 on the Hot 100 the following week despite a lack of airplay, as a result of sales and streams. The song lasted for two weeks on the chart. On June 25, 2020, seven years after its release, "Heartbreaker" was certified gold by the Recording Industry Association of America (RIAA) for pushing 500,000 certified units in the United States.

Outside of North America, "Heartbreaker" was most successful in Denmark, reaching the top position on the Danish Track Top-40. It further peaked at number three in Greece, number four in Spain, number five in the Netherlands and Norway, and number seven in Italy. The track debuted at numbers 12 and 14 on the Hungarian Single Top 40 and the UK Singles Chart, respectively. It also reached the top 30 in Austria, New Zealand, Scotland, France, and Australia.

== Credits and personnel ==
Credits adapted from Tidal.

- Justin Bieber – songwriting, production
- Maejor Ali – songwriting, production
- Chef Tone – songwriting, production
- Xavier Smith – songwriting
- T-Minus – songwriting, production

== Charts ==
Chart performance for "Heartbreaker"
Chart (2013)	Peak position
Australia (ARIA)	30
Austria (Ö3 Austria Top 40)	18
Belgium (Ultratop 50 Flanders)	8
Belgium Urban (Ultratop Flanders)	2
Belgium (Ultratop 50 Wallonia)	15
Canada Hot 100 (Billboard)	15
Denmark (Tracklisten)	1
Finland Download (Latauslista)	1
France (SNEP)	26
Germany (GfK)	32
Greece Digital Songs (Billboard)	3
Hungary (Single Top 40)	12
Italy (FIMI)	7
Netherlands (Single Top 100)	5
New Zealand (Recorded Music NZ)	21
Norway (VG-lista)	5
Scottish Singles Sales (Official Charts)	21
Spain (Promusicae)	4
Sweden (Sverigetopplistan)	47
UK Singles (Official Charts)	14
UK Hip Hop/R&B (Official Charts)	3
US Billboard Hot 100	13

== Certifications ==
Certifications for "Heartbreaker"
Region	Certification	Certified units/sales
Australia (ARIA)	Gold	35,000^{‡}
Brazil (Pro-Música Brasil)	Platinum	60,000^{‡}
New Zealand (RMNZ)	Gold	15,000^{‡}
United States (RIAA)	Gold	500,000^{‡}
^{‡} Sales+streaming figures based on certification alone.

== Release history ==
Release dates and formats for "Heartbreaker"
Region	Date	Format(s)	Label	Ref.
Various	October 7, 2013	Digital download; streaming	Island	
