= Justin Bieber videography =

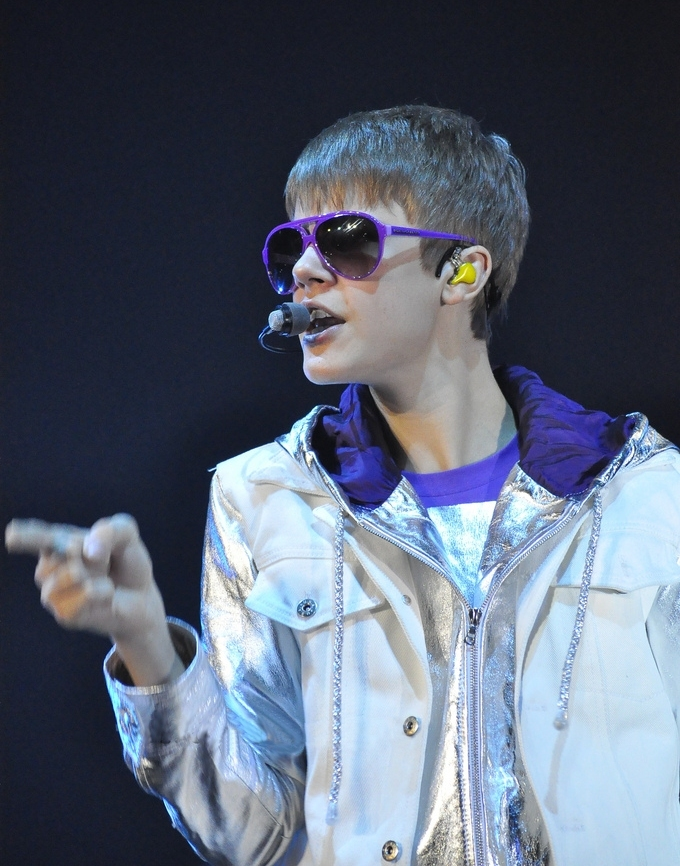
- Bieber in 2011
- Film: 14
- Television series: 24
- Music videos: 111
- Advertising: 17

Canadian singer Justin Bieber has starred in 111 music videos, 13 films, and has made 24 appearances in several television series. For his debut extended play My World (2009), Bieber released music videos for the singles "One Time", "One Less Lonely Girl", and "Love Me". Bieber released his debut studio-album, My World 2.0 (2010), which produced the hit single "Baby" featuring Ludacris. It broke the Guinness World Record for being the most popular video of any kind online and propelled Bieber to global stardom. As of August 2023, it has accumulated over 3 billion views and 24 million likes on YouTube. Both albums were featured in Bieber's first concert film, Justin Bieber: Never Say Never, which became the highest-grossing concert/performance film of all-time at the global box office, with nearly $100 million in earnings. Based on initial tracking, it became the highest-grossing concert movie in the United States since 1984 and the third-highest-grossing documentary since 1982.

Bieber released a Christmas-themed second studio-album, Under the Mistletoe (2011), which included music videos for various singles including "Mistletoe". He went on to release his third studio-album, Believe (2012), exploring a more mature style of music and appeal. The music video for "Boyfriend", the album's lead single, set a Vevo record for the most views in a 24-hour period, with over eight million. Believe also produced the hit singles "As Long as You Love Me" and "Beauty and a Beat", and their respective music videos; the latter of which was co-directed by Bieber. The album was featured in Bieber's second concert film, Justin Bieber's Believe.

Following two turbulent years, Bieber made his return with "Where Are Ü Now", a collaboration with Jack Ü. Its music video received four nominations at the 2015 MTV Video Music Awards and won the MTV Video Music Award for Best Visual Effects. The song's musical direction inspired Bieber's fourth studio-album, Purpose (2015), which produced the worldwide hit singles "What Do You Mean?", "Sorry", and "Love Yourself". The music video for "Sorry" has amassed over 3.9 billion views on YouTube, his most-viewed video to-date. It was nominated for Video of the Year at the 2016 MTV Video Music Awards and 2016 American Music Awards, winning in the latter. The album featured "a series of video vignettes" for each track on its standard edition titled Purpose: The Movement. Between 2016 and 2017, Bieber diversified on numerous commercially successful collaborations with accompanying music videos, including "Cold Water", "Let Me Love You", "Despacito Remix", "I'm the One", "2U", and "Friends". The music video for "I'm the One", was nominated for Best Hip Hop Video at the 2017 MTV Video Music Awards and Best Music Video at the 2018 iHeartRadio Music Awards, winning in the latter. In 2019, Bieber released "I Don't Care" and "10,000 Hours", both of which attained international success. "I Don't Care" was nominated for Best Music Video at the 2020 iHeartRadio Music Awards, while "10,000 Hours" was nominated for Video of the Year at the 55th Academy of Country Music Awards.

Bieber released his fifth studio-album, Changes (2020), which spawned the hit singles "Yummy" and "Intentions", with the former being nominated for Best Music Video at the 2021 iHeartRadio Music Awards. Changes followed its predecessor in featuring accompanying music videos for all album tracks titled Changes: The Movement. Bieber also released a 10-part YouTube Originals docu-series, Justin Bieber: Seasons, which focused on an array of themes: his life post-hiatus from music, marriage, preparation for new music, and battle against Lyme disease. The docu-series amassed 32.65 million views within its first week of release, breaking the record for the most-viewed premiere in its first week of all YouTube Originals. The same year, Bieber released a duet with Ariana Grande, "Stuck with U", which won the award for Best Music Video From Home at the 2020 MTV Video Music Awards. Bieber starred in DJ Khaled's music video for "Popstar", which received nominations for Video of the Year and Best Direction at the 2021 MTV Video Music Awards. The following year Bieber released his highly anticipated sixth studio-album, Justice (2021), which became an international success and produced various hit singles including "Holy", "Lonely", "Anyone", "Hold On", "Peaches", and "Ghost". At the 2021 MTV Video Music Awards, "Holy" and "Peaches" were nominated for Best Cinematography and Best Editing, respectively. The music video for "Peaches" was also nominated for the Best Music Video at the 64th Annual Grammy Awards and Best Video at the 2021 MTV Europe Music Awards and 2022 iHeartRadio Music Awards, respectively. Bieber also released a documentary film titled Justin Bieber: Our World that delves into his personal life and performative preparations towards his 2020 New Year's Eve show on the rooftop of the Beverly Hilton hotel. The film was nominated for Best Music Film at the 65th Annual Grammy Awards. The same year, Bieber collaborated with The Kid Laroi on "Stay", which became an international hit and its music video was nominated for Best Visual Effects at the 2022 MTV Video Music Awards and Best Music Video at the 2022 iHeartRadio Music Awards, respectively. Bieber went on to perform a virtual interactive live show titled "Live in the Metaverse" in collaboration with Wave, which received nominations for Best Metaverse Performance at the 2022 MTV Europe Music Awards and 2022 MTV Video Music Awards, respectively.

Overall, 11 music videos by Bieber have surpassed over 1 billion views on YouTube (fifth most of all-time), his most recent being "Beauty and a Beat". His YouTube channel is currently the fifth most viewed music channel on the platform behind Bad Bunny, Taylor Swift, BTS, and Blackpink, having attracted over 32.5 billion views. With over 74.5 million subscribers, he remains the most subscribed solo artist on YouTube and held the overall record for six years.

== Music videos ==
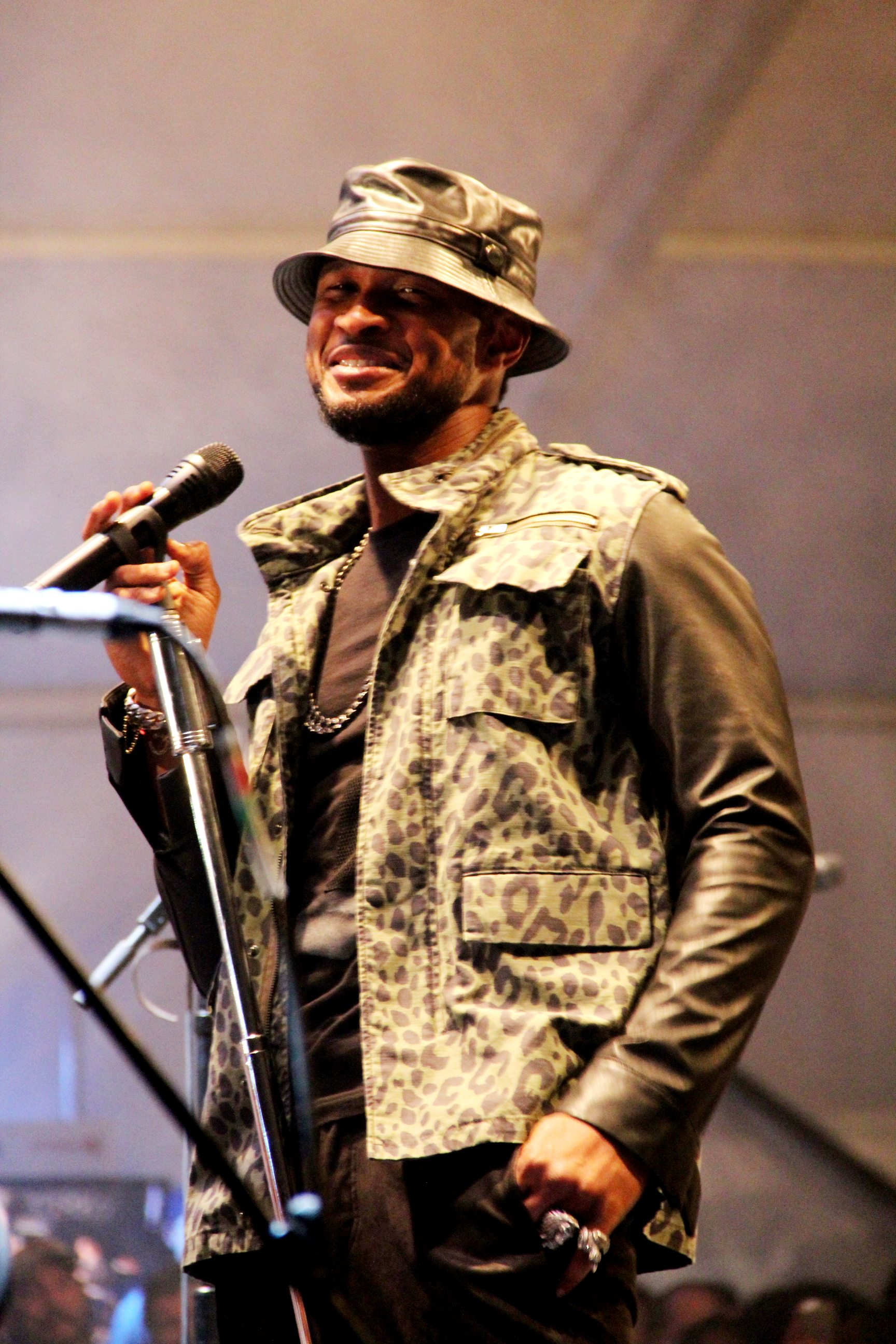
Usher made a cameo appearance in the music video for "One Time" (Bieber's first single).

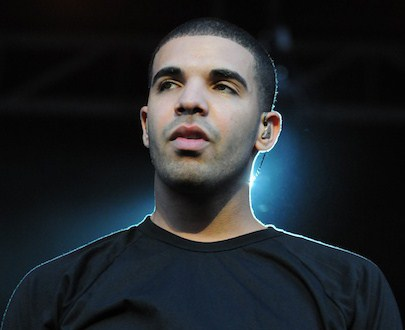
Drake makes a cameo appearance in the "Baby" video.

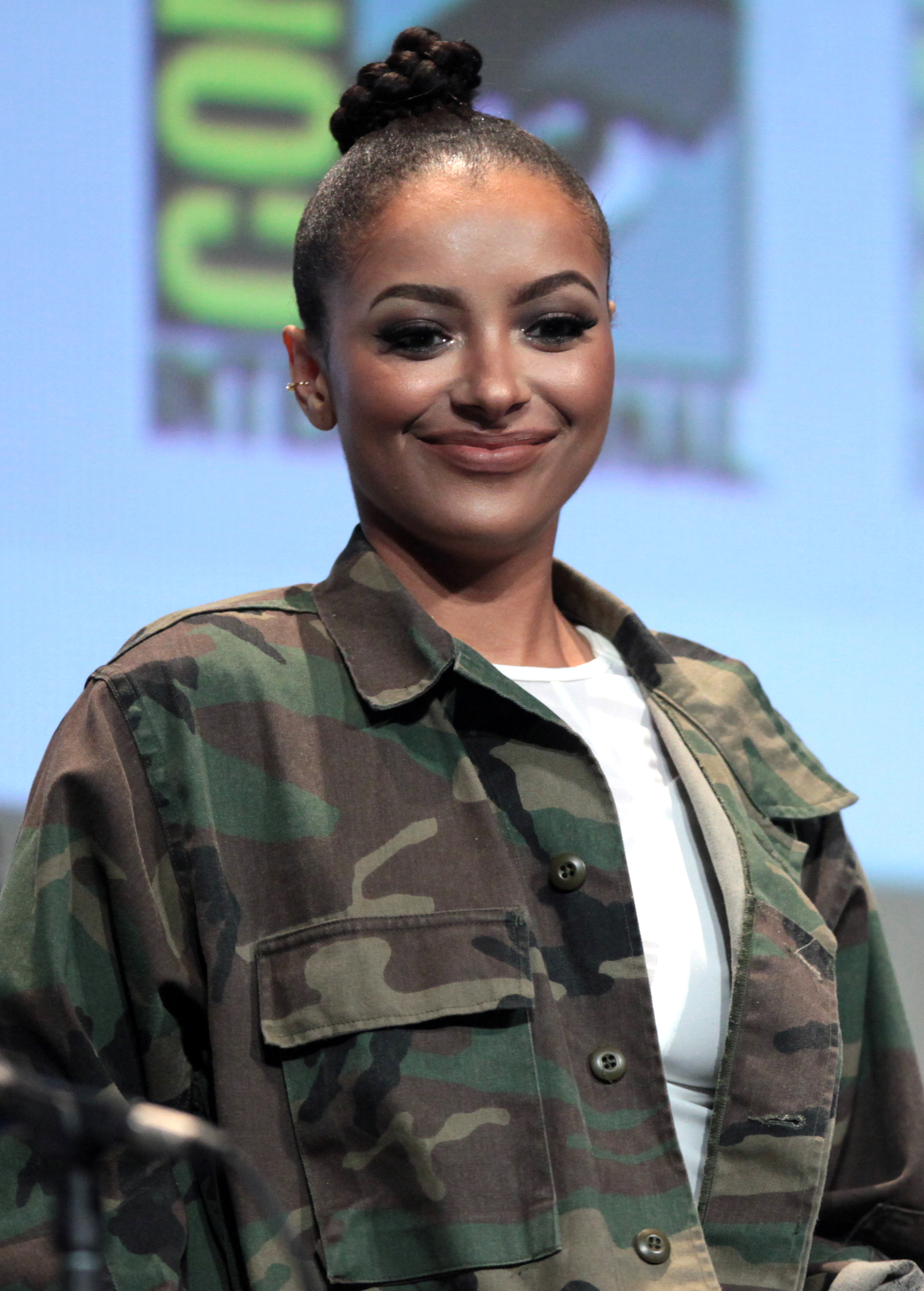
Kat Graham makes a cameo appearance in the "Somebody to Love (Remix)" video.

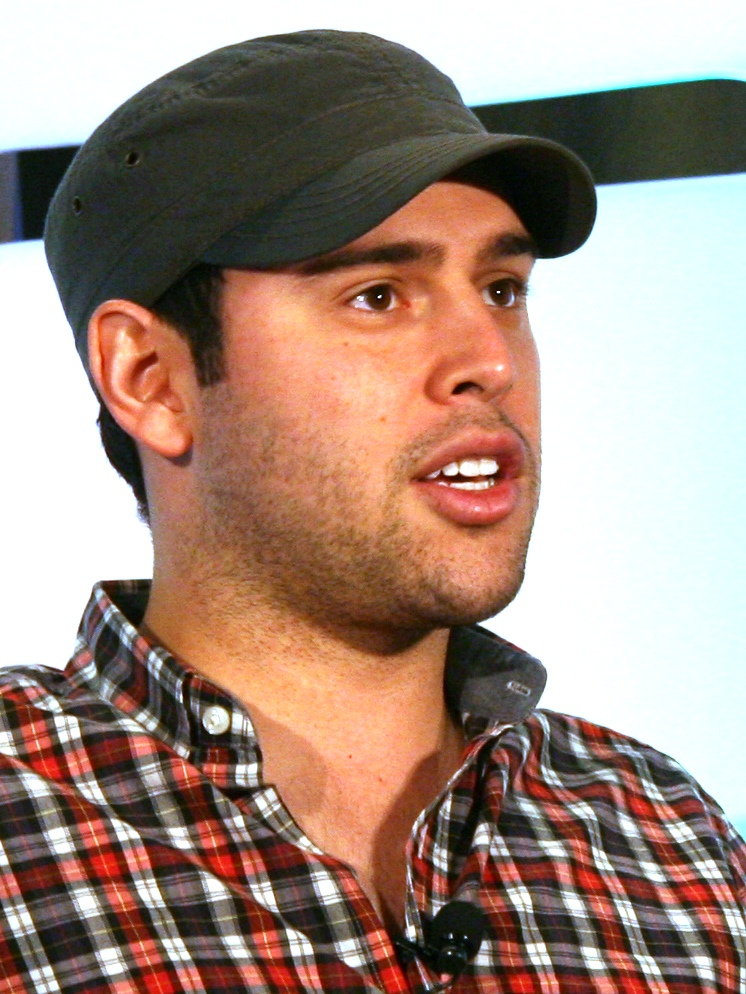
Scooter Braun, Bieber's manager, directed the music video for "Pray".

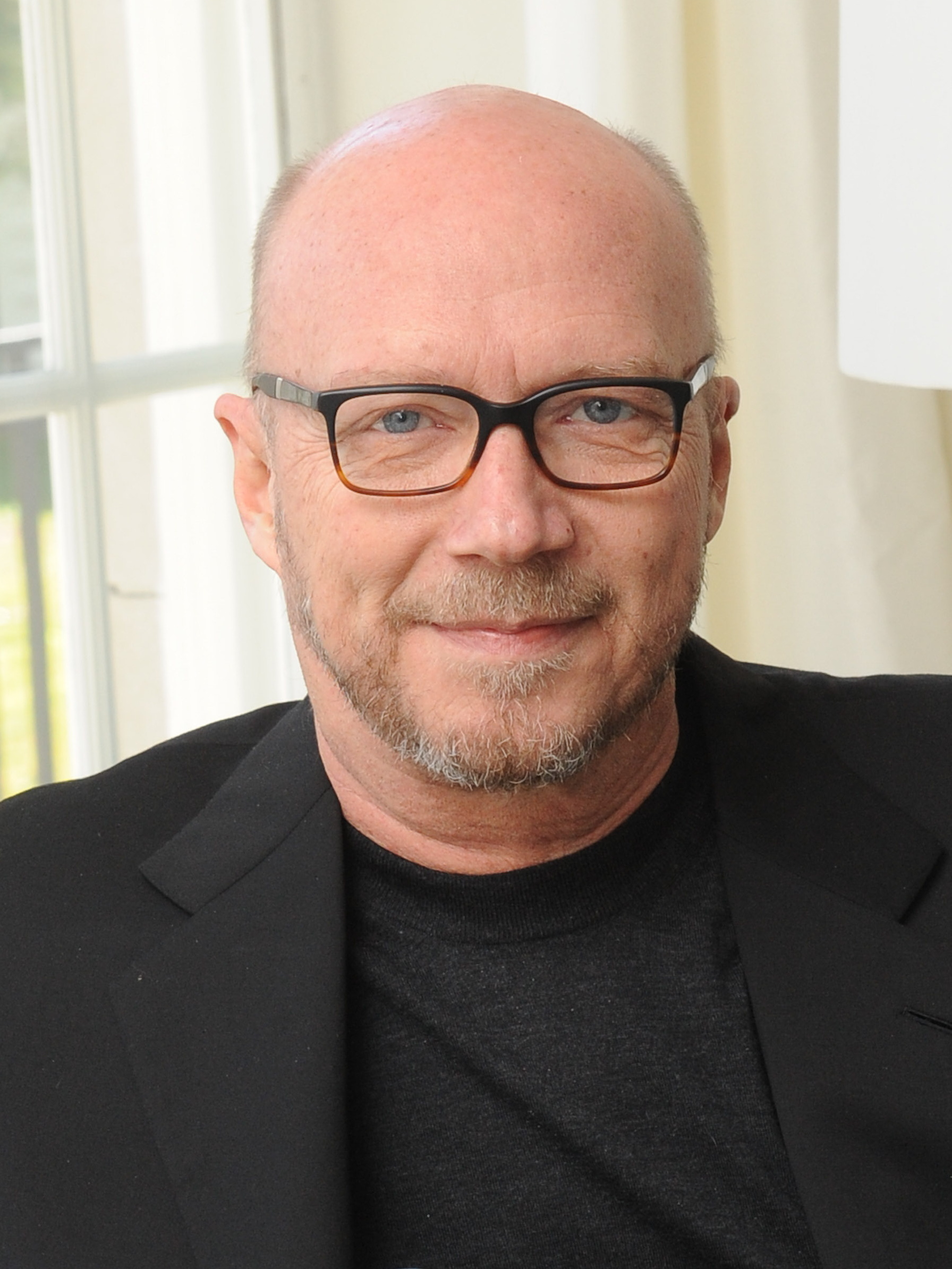
Paul Haggis directed the music video for "We Are the World 25 for Haiti".

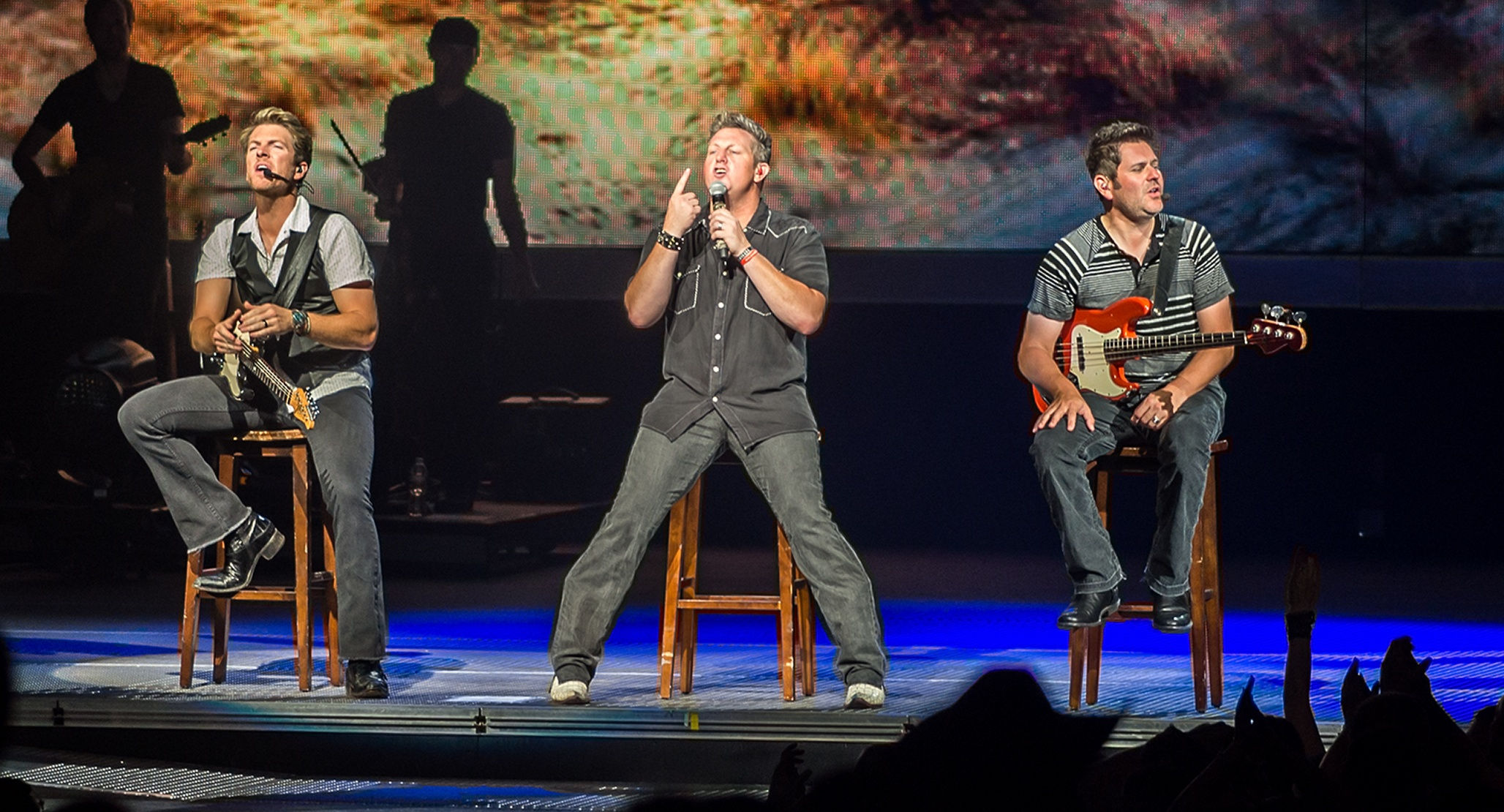
Rascal Flatts join Bieber in the music video for "That Should Be Me (Remix)".

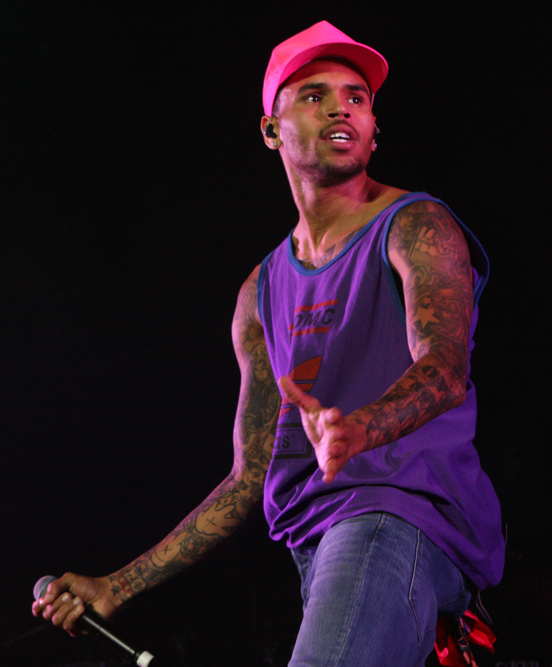
Chris Brown first collaborated with Bieber on the music video for "Next to You".

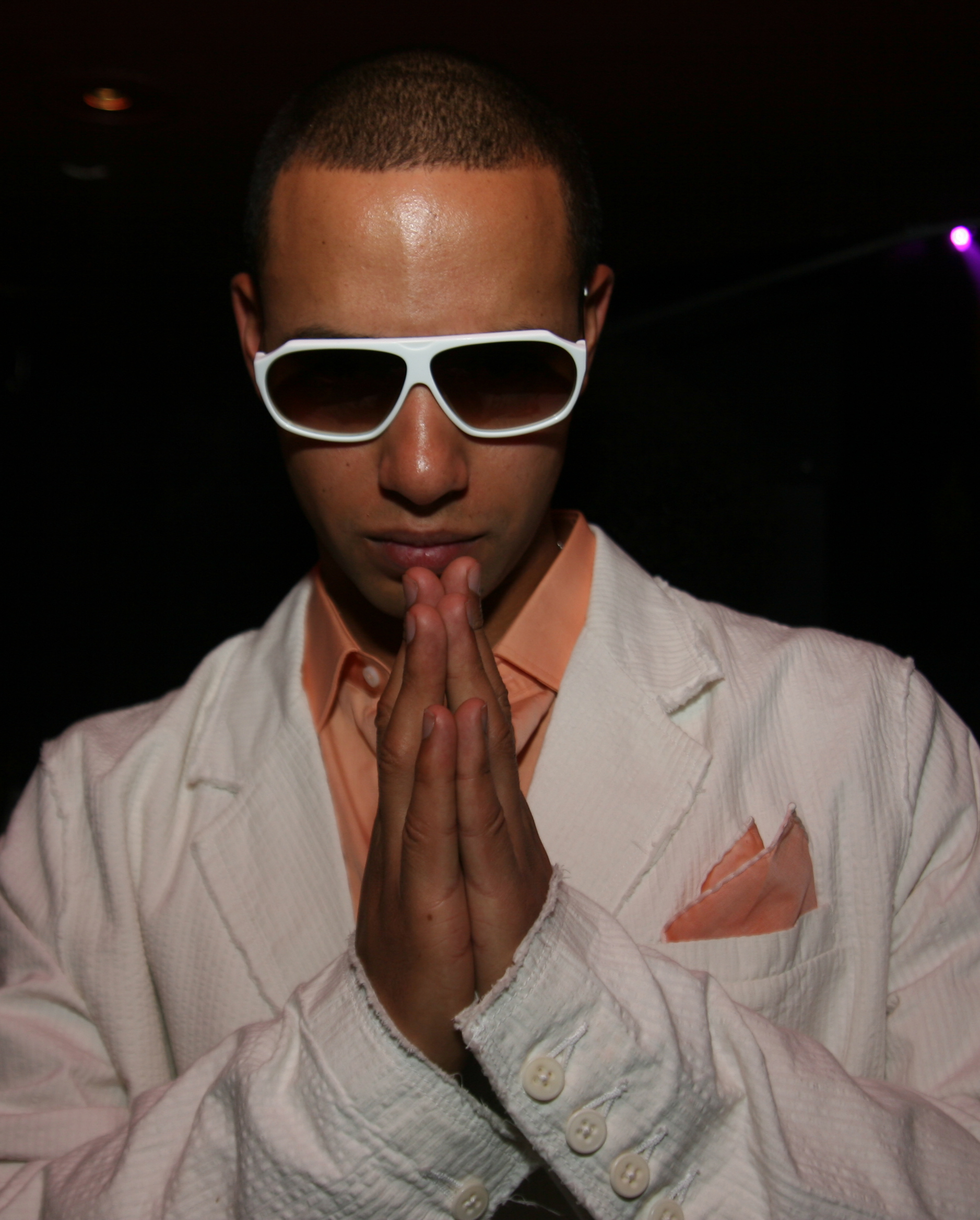
Director X directed the music video for "Boyfriend".

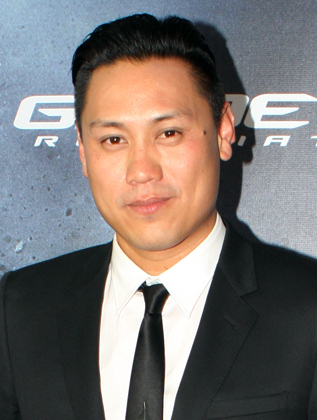
Jon Chu and Bieber himself co-directed the music video for "Beauty and a Beat".

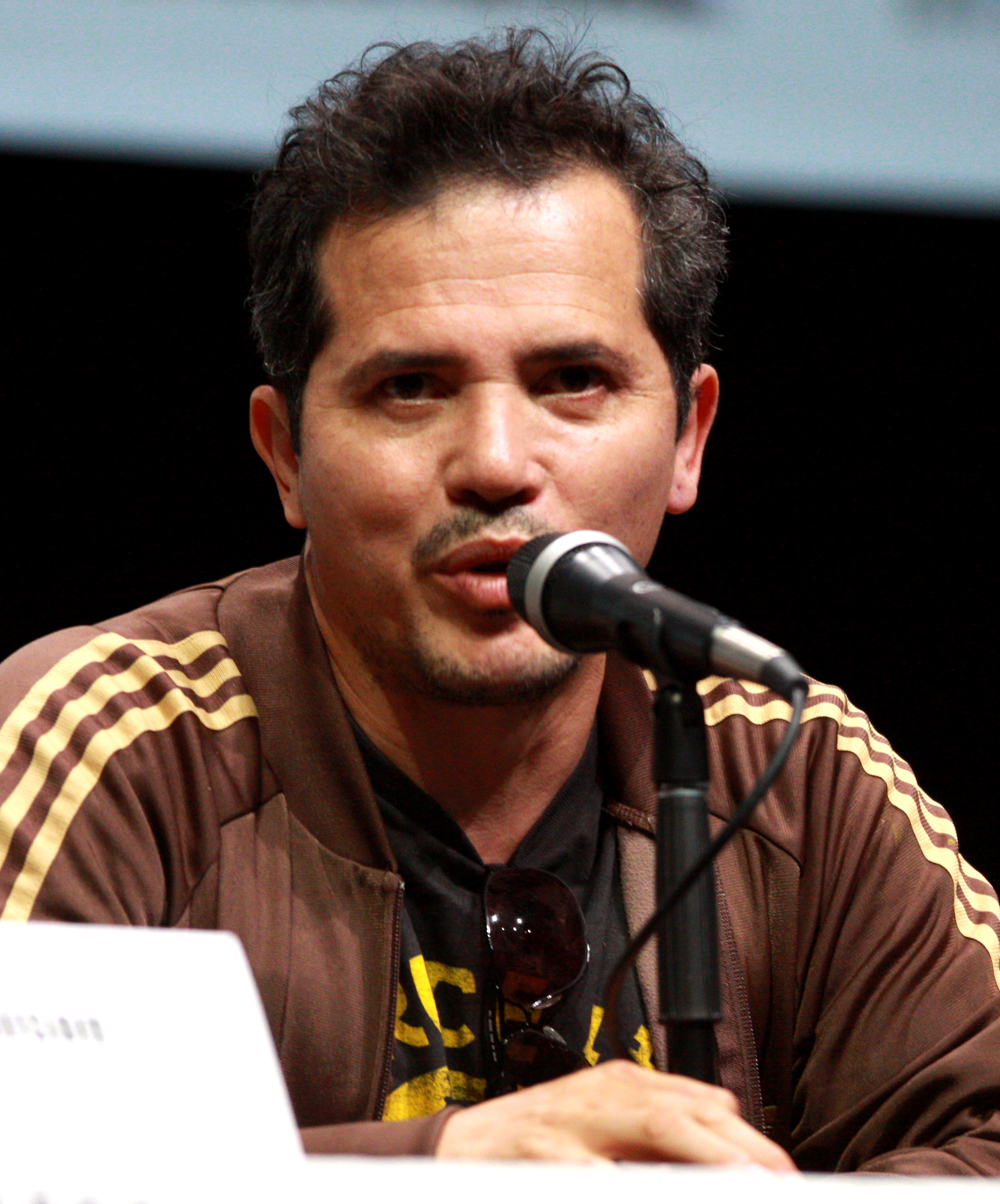
John Leguizamo plays Bieber's antagonist in the music video for "What Do You Mean?"

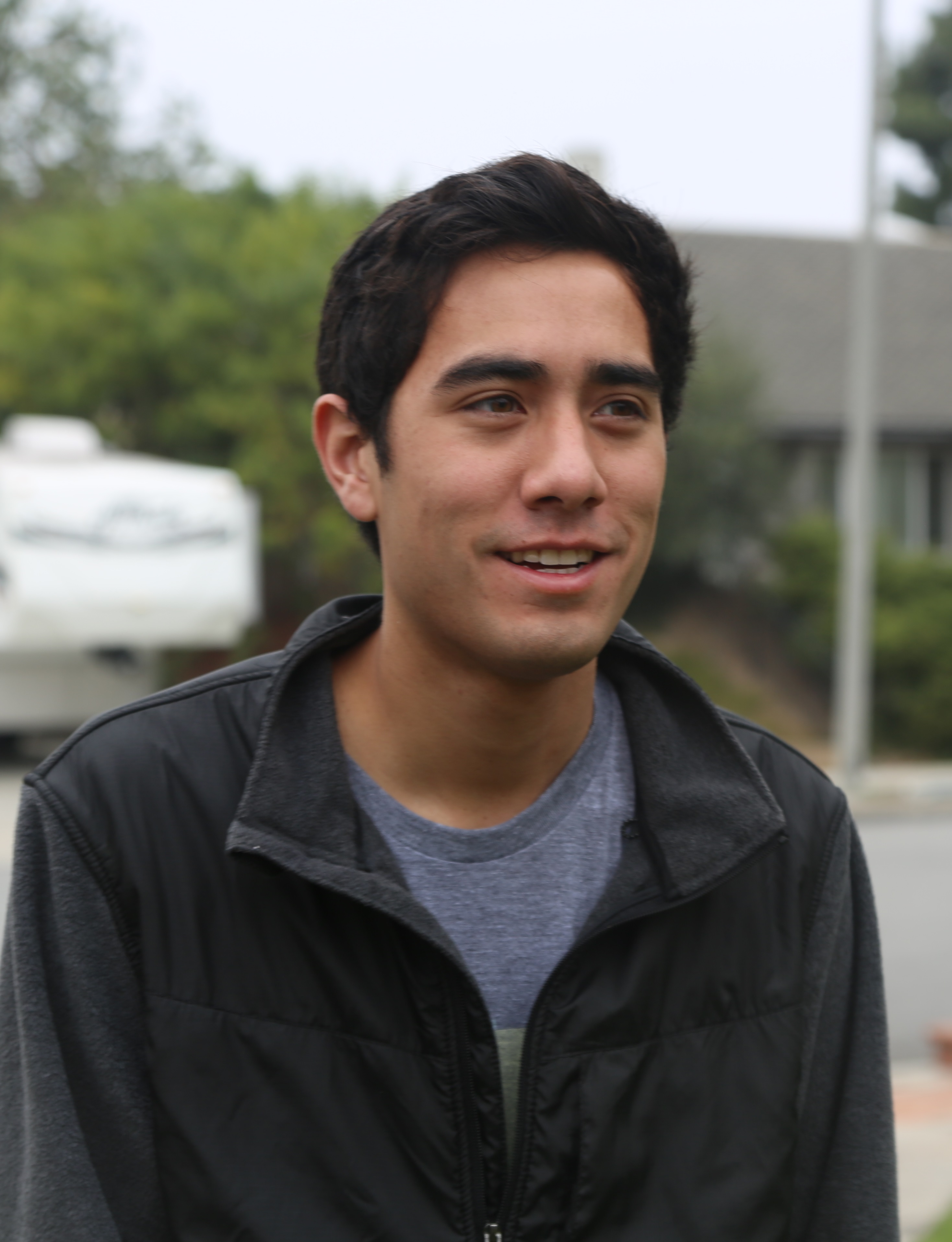
Zach King co-directed the "Sorry" lyric video.

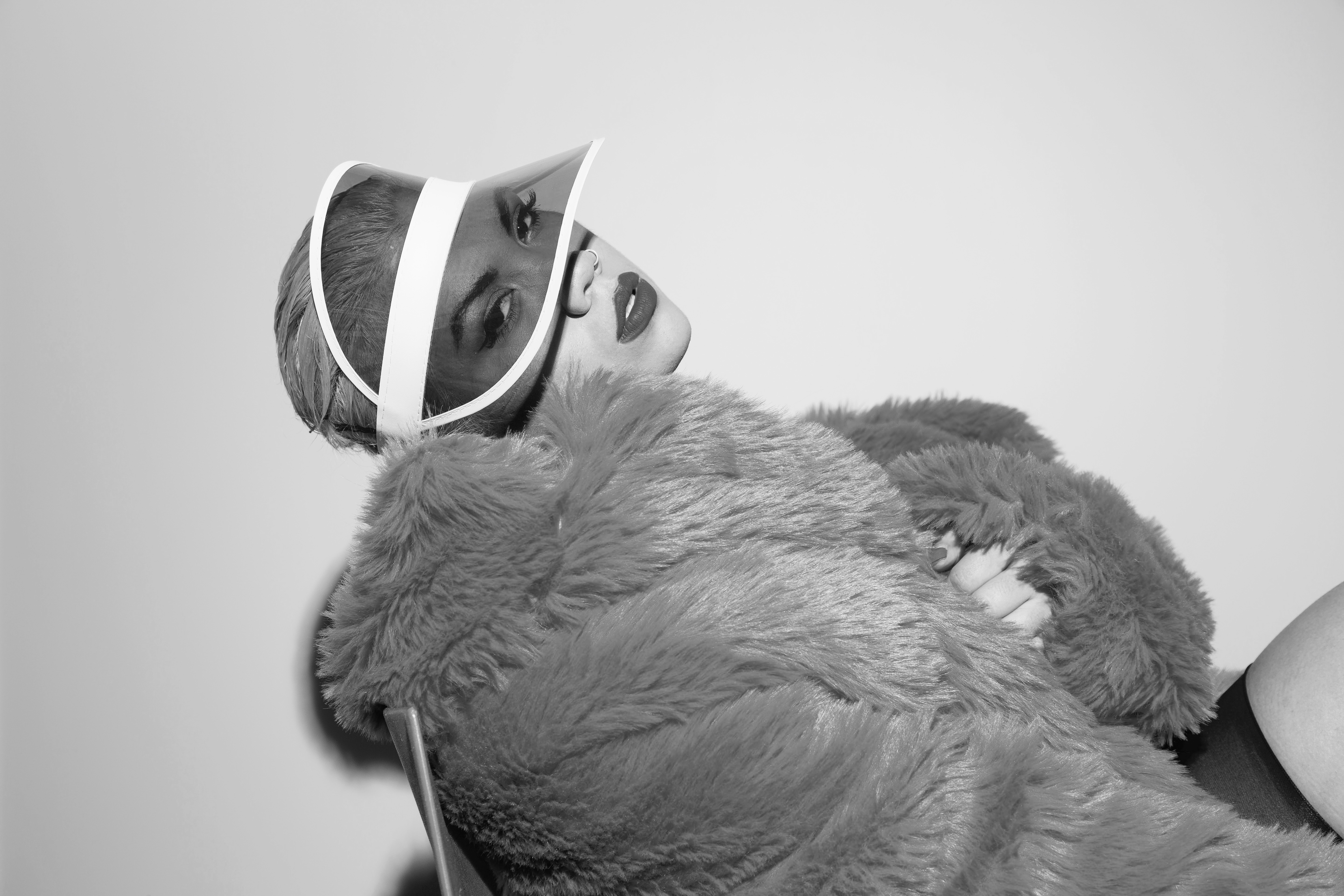
Parris Goebel choreographed and directed the music videos for "Sorry" and "Love Yourself".

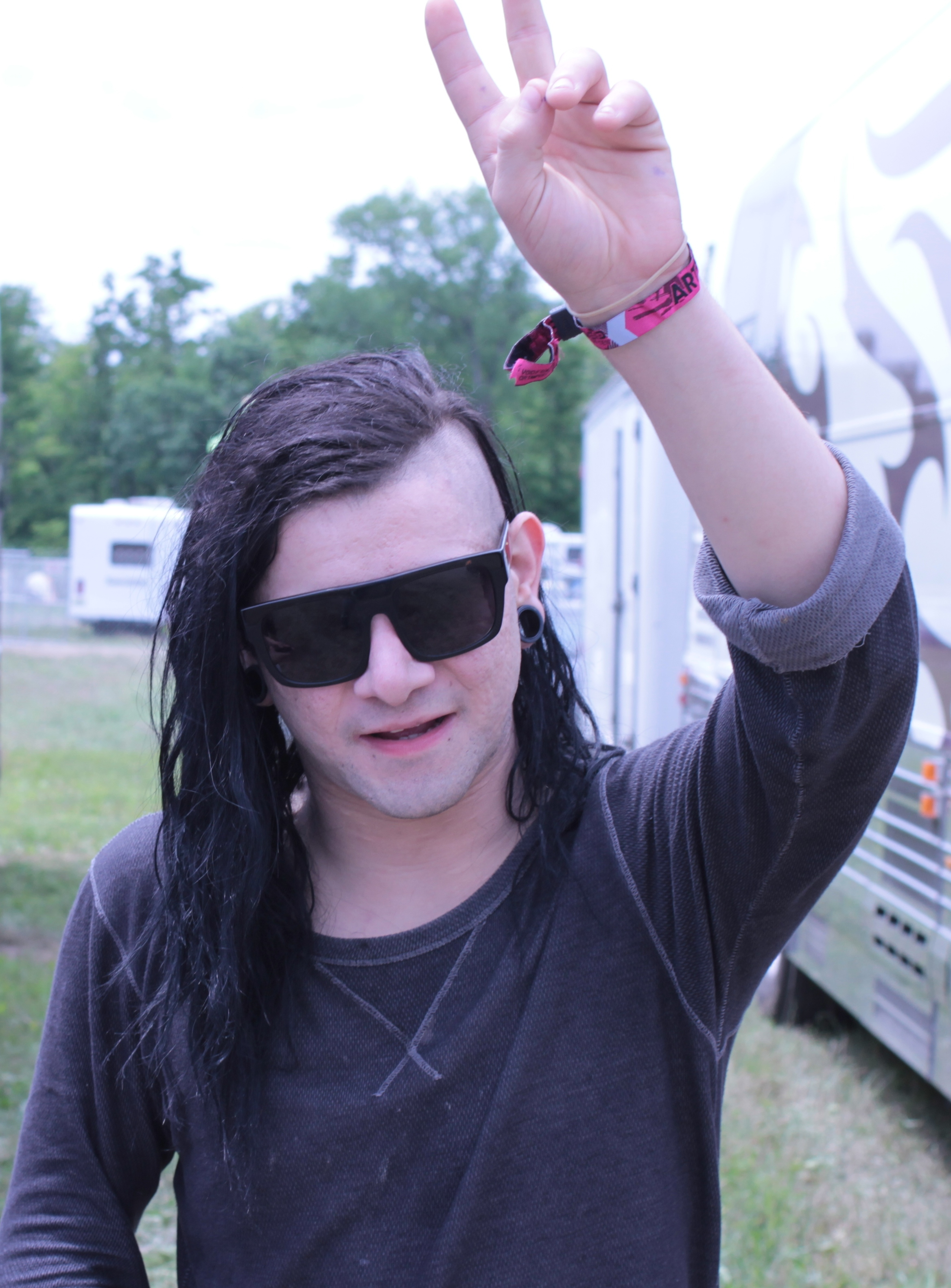
Skrillex appeared in the music video for "Where Are Ü Now".

Title	Year	Other credited performer(s)	Director(s)	Description	Ref.
"One Time"	2009	None	Vashtie Kola	Bieber's mentor Usher and one of his closest friends (Ryan Butler) appear in the video, in which Bieber grins mischievously at the camera while he holds a house party at Usher's home.	
"One Less Lonely Girl"	2009	None	Roman White	Shot in Watertown, Tennessee, the video shows Bieber determined to win a girl's heart after leading her around the town to find him. Bieber's mother, Pattie Mallette, makes a cameo appearance in the flower-stand scene.	
"Baby"	2010	Ludacris	Ray Kay	The video was filmed in a bowling alley in Los Angeles' Universal CityWalk. Singer and actress Jasmine Villegas plays Bieber's love interest, who he chases and tries to woo back throughout the video. Bieber's friends, Young Money artists Drake and Lil Twist, along with Tinashe and the Rangers, make cameo appearances.	
"Never Let You Go"	2010	None	Colin Tilley	The video was filmed at the Atlantis Paradise Island resort in The Bahamas. American actress Paige Hurd plays Bieber's love interest.	
"Eenie Meenie"	2010	Sean Kingston	Ray Kay	Filmed in Beverly Hills, California, the video features Kingston and Bieber at a pool party at a condo, both being pursued by the same girl.	
"Never Say Never"	2010	Jaden Smith	Honey	Set in a recording studio, the video features Bieber and Smith singing the song and playing around, being intercut with scenes from the film The Karate Kid (2010), where Smith also stars in. The two are shown performing karate moves, dancing, eating Twizzlers and shadowboxing. Near the end of the clip, Bieber performs a roundhouse kick.	
"Somebody to Love (Remix)"	2010	Usher	Dave Meyers	The video focuses heavily on dance and includes America's Best Dance Crew season-five winners the Poreotics, season-three runner-up Beat Freaks, as well as various other dancers and dance crews. Singer and actress Kat Graham makes an appearance in a scene with the Poreotics.	
"Love Me"	2010	None	Alfredo Flores	A tribute to the fans, the video features clips of live performances, behind-the-scenes footage and Bieber dancing in front of white backdrop.	
"U Smile"	2010	None	Colin Tilley	Bieber is seen leaving an empty theater and encounters a group of fans. Bieber takes an interest with one particular girl and they sneak into the empty theater, where they hold hands and play around. After a playful back-alley water fight, they end up in each other's arms. Some scenes show Bieber singing and playing the piano inside the theater.	
"Pray"	2010	None	Alfredo Flores; Scooter Braun	Bieber highlights social injustice around the world (like the human toll of war and in earthquake-torn Haiti and post-Katrina New Orleans) and visits hospitalized children and soldiers in active duty. Clips of Bieber praying before shows and performing in concert are also shown.	
"We Are the World 25 for Haiti"	2010	Artists for Haiti	Paul Haggis	Haitian film students were part of the production crew. The music video, similar to "We Are the World", opens with the song's title with the recording artists' signatures surrounding it and clips of the artists in the studio (including archival footage of Michael Jackson performing his part of the song). It is intercut with shots of Haiti after the earthquake.	
"Wavin' Flag"	2010	Young Artists for Haiti	Unknown	Created by Canadian artists, the song for the video was a charity single to benefit relief efforts after the 2010 Haiti earthquake.	
"Never Say Never" (Original Motion Picture version)	2011	Jaden Smith	Unknown	Exclusive music video to promote Bieber's concert film Justin Bieber: Never Say Never (2011).	
"That Should Be Me (Remix)"	2011	Rascal Flatts	Mark Kalbfeld	The video begins with Rascal Flatts arriving at a studio in a Cadillac Escalade. Inside, Bieber sings and plays a keyboard and a guitar; he is joined by Joe Don Rooney on guitar and Jay DeMarcus on keyboard. Gary LeVox sings, joined by Bieber for the chorus, with Rooney on guitar and DeMarcus playing a grand piano.	
"Next to You"	2011	Chris Brown	Colin Tilley	The video features Brown and Bieber interacting with their girlfriends before the apocalypse occurs. Brown searches for his love interest amongst the chaos, as she's hit by the car that Bieber's girlfriend is in. Brown saves his love interest while Bieber's girlfriend leaves the car and finds him on top of a building, where they reunite and kiss. Interspersed are scenes of Brown and Bieber dancing amongst the destruction.	
"Mistletoe"	2011	None	Roman White	Shot in Franklin, Tennessee, the Christmas-themed video shows Bieber courting a girl in a small town adorned with white lights and snow.	
"Santa Claus Is Coming to Town" (Animagic version)	2011	None	Unknown	Bieber's first animated music video.	
"Fa La La"	2011	Boyz II Men	Colin Tilley	In the black-and-white video, filmed in downtown Los Angeles, Bieber is seen standing in an empty ballroom and later joins with Boyz II Men on the front steps of a building to sing.	
"All I Want for Christmas Is You (SuperFestive!)"	2011	Mariah Carey	Sanaa Hamri	The video opens with Santa Claus spreading holiday cheer on a street at night, followed by Mariah Carey (in a scanty Santa suit) singing against a brick wall in a Macy's store. Bieber and a few friends pass with a shopping cart; he joins her, and they hand out gifts to their fans.	
"Santa Claus Is Coming to Town" (Arthur Christmas version)	2011	None	Damien Tromel; John Banana; Charles Oliver	In the industrial-themed video, which appeared in the animated film Arthur Christmas (2011), Bieber is an elf with robotic ligaments who works, sings and plays in Santa Claus' toy workshop.	
"Live My Life (Party Rock Remix)"	2012	Far East Movement; Redfoo	Mickey Finnegan	Bieber does not appear in the video, but is credited as a featured artist. Far East Movement, Redfoo and the Party Rock crew are seen touring and partying through the streets of Amsterdam in the Party Rock bus. They also perform a synchronized dance routine in a flash mob-style. Both Far East Movement and Redfoo perform their respective verses.	
"Live My Life"	2012	Far East Movement	Mickey Finnegan	Bieber does not appear in the video, but is credited as a featured artist. Far East Movement, Redfoo and the Party Rock crew are seen touring and partying through the streets of Amsterdam in the Party Rock bus. They also perform a synchronized dance routine in a flash mob-style.	
"Boyfriend"	2012	None	Director X	Filmed in Los Angeles, California, the video shows Bieber kissing a dark-haired woman's hand and jumping with her into a convertible next to a group of young people having fun around some muscle cars. This video showcases Bieber's new more mature style.	
"As Long as You Love Me"	2012	Big Sean	Anthony Mandler	The video is about an overprotective father (played by actor Michael Madsen) telling Bieber to stay away from his daughter, whom Bieber is dating. Though the video follows a storyline, there are scenes where Bieber is seen dancing outside the mansion of his girlfriend's father and in a parking building, where Big Sean appears and performs his rap verse.	
"Beauty and a Beat"	2012	Nicki Minaj	Jon Chu; Justin Bieber	The video starts with a short montage of video clips of personal footage, then heads into a party at a water park featuring dancers, and Minaj rapping beside Bieber in a pool. The video ends with Justin sliding down a water slide. Bieber wrote the video's storyline and co-directed.	
"All Around the World"	2013	Ludacris	Life Garland	A video centered on Bieber's concert performance in Mexico City during his Believe Tour, the clip also shows vistas from other countries Bieber visited. Ludacris joins Bieber on stage to perform his rap. It also includes images of the singer's fans, mostly crying and screaming for him.	
"All That Matters"	2013	None	Colin Tilley	The dimly-lit clip shows Bieber crooning, seducing and going shirtless alongside model Cailin Russo.	
"#thatPower"	2013	will.i.am	Ben Mor	Filmed in Japan, the video shows will.i.am and Bieber performing the song amidst various futuristic settings. The members of the Japanese dance group World Order make a cameo appearance.	
"Lolly"	2013	Maejor Ali; Juicy J	Matt Alonzo	Maejor Ali, Bieber and Juicy J perform in a colorful neon studio full of enthusiastic dancers and lollipop-lickers.	
"Wait for a Minute"	2013	Tyga	Krista Liney	Shot in front of a green screen with a CGI backdrop, the video shows Tyga and Bieber freezing time and switching between different scenarios trying to get away from the negative aspects of a celebrity lifestyle.	
"Hold Tight"	2014	None	Unknown	The video features concert footage of Bieber performing "One Less Lonely Girl" during his Believe Tour. When Bieber performs the song on each venue, he invites a girl on stage to hold hands with and hug tight during the performance.	
"Confident"	2014	Chance the Rapper	Colin Tilley	Bieber unsuccessfully tries to seduce a young woman in a gas station. Although she is interested, she says he has to "try harder" to get her. Bieber follows her, singing and dancing with a group of dancers. At the end, he kisses her and she decides to give him her phone number.	
"I Really Like You"	2015	Carly Rae Jepsen	Peter Glanz	Bieber appears with Tom Hanks and Carly Rae Jepsen, leading a troupe of dancers in front of the Mondrian Hotel in Manhattan.	
"Where Are Ü Now"	2015	Jack Ü	Brewer	The video opens in an art gallery filled with photos of Bieber's silhouette before shifting to Bieber himself singing the track in a dark room. Bieber then becomes covered in animated paint, drawings and caricatures. Back in the gallery, Jack Ü fans provide the illustrations that appear over and surround Bieber's body as he sings and dances to the track.	
"What Do You Mean?"	2015	None	Brad Furman	The colorful, action-packed music video features actor John Leguizamo and model Xenia Deli. The video was filmed at the Harvard House motel in East Hollywood.	
"What Do You Mean?" (Lyric video)	2015	None	Laban	A simple, black and white video featuring skateboarders Ryan Sheckler and Chelsea Castro performing skateboard tricks while the song's lyrics are displayed. Near the end of the video, Sheckler joins Bieber in a film studio, where he also starts skateboarding.	
"What Do You Mean? (Acoustic)"	2015	None	Rory Kramer	A simple, black and white video featuring Bieber singing the track while sitting next to his musical director Dan Kanter on acoustic guitar.	
"Sorry"	2015	None	Parris Goebel	The colorful, fun, and upbeat dance video with a 90's vibe features the New Zealand ReQuest Dance Crew and The Royal Family Dance Crew. The video was directed and choreographed by New Zealander Parris Goebel, who also appears in the clip.	
"Sorry" (Lyric video)	2015	None	Zach King; Aaron Benítez	The video shows a young woman (dancer Lauren Hudson Petrilli) attempting to erase written apologies, which appear sprawled in graffiti writing inside and outside her house.	
"I'll Show You"	2015	None	Rory Kramer	With glacial lagoons and rivers in South Iceland, including the Seljalandsfoss and Skógafoss waterfalls, Bieber runs over lush green mountains, sits on the edge of a cliff, rolls down hills, skateboards on a derelict airplane and swims in icy water in just his underwear.	
"Mark My Words"	2015	None	Parris Goebel	First music video from Purpose: The Movement, a series of video vignettes to accompany the songs from the Purpose album, which when played in sequence form a 40-minute dance film.	
"I'll Show You" (Purpose: The Movement version)	2015	None	Parris Goebel	Second music video from Purpose: The Movement. The video does not feature Bieber.	
"What Do You Mean?" (Purpose: The Movement version)	2015	None	Parris Goebel	Like the video for "Sorry", the short clip features the dancers from ReQuest Dance Crew and The Royal Family Dance Crew, and was also directed and choreographed by Parris Goebel. The video does not feature Bieber.	
"Love Yourself"	2015	None	Parris Goebel	Begins with a monologue by Bieber on the nature of love, followed by Filipino husband-and-wife dancers Keone and Mari Madrid dancing through their home. As the wife dismisses her husband's attention throughout the clip, the video ends with the wife waking up one day to find a note on her husband's pillow saying: "Love Yourself".	
"Company" (Purpose: The Movement version)	2015	None	Parris Goebel	The video follows a group of women who meet a group of guys in a diner. One member of each party leaves the restaurant and dance together in front of a lit-up Hard Rock Café, but midway through the clip the protagonists are replaced by many gyrating women behind a mysterious hotel room door.	
"No Pressure"	2015	Big Sean	Parris Goebel	Seventh music video from Purpose: The Movement. Although the video does not feature Bieber, Big Sean makes a brief appearance.	
"No Sense"	2015	Travis Scott	Parris Goebel	Eighth music video from Purpose: The Movement. Although the video does not feature Bieber, Travis Scott makes a brief appearance.	
"The Feeling"	2015	Halsey	Parris Goebel	Ninth music video from Purpose: The Movement. Although the video does not feature Bieber, Halsey makes a brief appearance.	
"Life Is Worth Living"	2015	None	Parris Goebel	Tenth music video from Purpose: The Movement. The video does not feature Bieber.	
"Where Are Ü Now" (Purpose: The Movement version)	2015	Jack Ü	Parris Goebel	Eleventh music video from Purpose: The Movement. Although the video does not feature Bieber, Skrillex and Diplo from Jack Ü make a brief appearance.	
"Children"	2015	None	Parris Goebel	Twelfth music video from Purpose: The Movement. The video does not feature Bieber.	
"Purpose"	2015	None	Parris Goebel	Final music video from Purpose: The Movement. Bieber re-appears in the last video to the series in the same outfit and desert setting as in the clip for "Mark My Words".	
"Company"	2016	None	Rory Kramer	The video is a documentary-style compilation of clips of Bieber's world travels during his Purpose World Tour, in the studio recording the Purpose album, on the set of his Calvin Klein photo shoot and of him pensively looking out over nature.	
"Cold Water" (Lyric video)	2016	Major Lazer; MØ	John Hwang; Jeremie Carreon		
"Cold Water" (Live in Europe 2016 version)	2016	Major Lazer; MØ	Unknown	Black and white music video showing Major Lazer and MØ performing the song in front of a large live crowd in Europe.	
"Cold Water" (Dance video)	2016	Major Lazer; MØ	Matt Baron	The video features Major Lazer's female background dancers performing stylized choreography among various natural locations in Iceland.	
"Let Me Love You" (Lyric video)	2016	DJ Snake	Proximity		
"Let Me Love You"	2016	DJ Snake	James Lees	The video has been referred to as "Bonnie and Clyde with a twist", as it follows a couple of thieves in love engaging in various delinquent activities. In the end, it is revealed that the thieving couple are actually a videogame simulation, and the players on the other side are a young boy and an unkempt man with virtual reality devices on.	
"I'm the One"	2017	DJ Khaled; Quavo; Chance the Rapper; Lil Wayne	Eif Rivera	DJ Khaled, Bieber, Quavo, Chance the Rapper and Lil Wayne are seen enjoying a party at a luxury mansion in Malibu, California. Models Alexa Lawrence and Iryna Ivanova, as well as Quavo's fellow Migos members, Offset and Takeoff, make cameo appearances in the video.	
"2U" (The Victoria's Secret Angels Lip Sync)	2017	David Guetta	Jerome Duran	The video features Victoria's Secret models Sara Sampaio, Romee Strijd, Elsa Hosk, Jasmine Tookes, Stella Maxwell and Martha Hunt lip-syncing the song while on-set of a photo shoot for the lingerie brand.	
"2U"	2017	David Guetta	Brewer	The video, which was released to YouTube on September 29, 2017, is considered the song's official music video, despite being the second video released to promote the song. Guetta nor Bieber appear in the clip.	
"Hard 2 Face Reality" (Lyric video)	2018	Poo Bear; Jay Electronica	Hannah Stocking	In the lyric video, Hannah Stocking is cheated on by her abusive boyfriend, comforted by two of her friends (played by fellow Internet celebrities Lele Pons and Inanna Sarkis), and then finds new love.	
"Hard 2 Face Reality"	2018	Poo Bear; Jay Electronica	Nic Stanich	According to its director, the dance video went from concept to finished product within 48 hours.	
"No Brainer"	2018	DJ Khaled; Chance the Rapper; Quavo	Colin Tilley	The video takes place on the set of a Hollywood movie where Bieber helms the director's chair alongside DJ Khaled to co-direct scenes of themselves as well as scenes with Quavo and Chance the Rapper.	
"Earth"	2019	Lil Dicky	Nigel Tierney; Federico Heller	The music video mostly takes place in an animated world with a cartoon version of Lil Dicky in a Tarzan-style outfit among 30 other celebrity guests, including Bieber, singing their verses portrayed as different animated characters.	
"I Don't Care"	2019	Ed Sheeran	Emil Nava	The music video shows Sheeran and Bieber up against a green screen and wearing a slew of silly costumes as the background constantly changes behind them.	
"10,000 Hours"	2019	Dan + Shay	Patrick Tracy		
"Yummy"	2020	None	Bardia Zeniali	The video portrays Bieber with pink hair at a dinner party in a fancy restaurant, eating various colorful food items with the guests before starting a dance party.	
"Intentions" (Short version)	2020	Quavo	Michael D. Ratner	The video previews Bieber (along with Quavo) drawing attention to the difficulties of women and children in need while raising awareness and funds for Alexandria House, whose mission is to help them move from crisis to stability.	
"Intentions"	2020	Quavo	Michael D. Ratner	The video previews Bieber (along with Quavo) drawing attention to the difficulties of women and children in need while raising awareness and funds for Alexandria House, whose mission is to help them move from crisis to stability.	
"All Around Me" (Changes: The Movement version)	2020	None	Nick DeMoura; Phillip Chbeeb		
"Habitual" (Changes: The Movement version)	2020	None	Nick DeMoura		
"Come Around Me" (Changes: The Movement version)	2020	None	Nick DeMoura		
"Forever" (Changes: The Movement version)	2020	Post Malone; Clever	Nick DeMoura		
"Take It Out On Me" (Changes: The Movement version)	2020	None	Nick DeMoura		
"Running Over" (Changes: The Movement version)	2020	Lil Dicky	Nick DeMoura		
"Second Emotion" (Changes: The Movement version)	2020	Travis Scott	Nick DeMoura		
"Available" (Changes: The Movement version)	2020	None	Nick DeMoura		
"Get Me" (Changes: The Movement version)	2020	Kehlani	Nick DeMoura		
"E.T.A." (Changes: The Movement version)	2020	None	Nick DeMoura		
"Changes" (Changes: The Movement version)	2020	None	Nick DeMoura		
"Confirmation" (Changes: The Movement version)	2020	None	Mary John Frank		
"That's What Love Is" (Changes: The Movement version)	2020	None	Nick DeMoura		
"At Least For Now" (Changes: The Movement version)	2020	None	Nick DeMoura		
"Yummy (Summer Walker Remix)" (Changes: The Movement version)	2020	None	Nick DeMourda; Jordan Taylor		
"Habitual" (Nature Visual version)	2020	None	Michael D. Ratner		
"Available" (Nature Visual version)	2020	None	Michael D. Ratner		
"E.T.A." (Nature Visual version)	2020	None	Michael D. Ratner		
"Changes" (Nature Visual version)	2020	None	Michael D. Ratner		
"Stuck with U"	2020	Ariana Grande	Scooter Braun; Rory Kramer; Alfredo Flores		
"Popstar" (Guest Appearance)	2020	DJ Khaled; Drake	OZ; David x Eli; DJ Khaled		
"Holy"	2020	Chance The Rapper	Colin Tilley		
"Holy" (Lyric video)	2020	Chance The Rapper	Katia Temkin		
"Lonely"	2020	Benny Blanco	Jake Schreier		
"Monster"	2020	Shawn Mendes	Colin Tilley	The video is shot in a single take, and starts with Mendes walking through the woods onto a platform with stairs and continuing his performance there, before being joined by Bieber.	
"Holy (Acoustic)"	2020	Chance the Rapper	Rory Kramer		
"Anyone"	2021	None	Colin Tilley		
"Hold On"	2021	None	Colin Tilley		
"Peaches"	2021	Daniel Caesar; Giveon	Colin Tilley		
"2 Much" (Live from Paris version)	2021	None	David Ctiborsky		
"Somebody" (Live from Paris version)	2021	None	David Ctiborsky		
"Off My Face" (Live from Paris version)	2021	None	David Ctiborsky		
"Hold On" (Live from Paris version)	2021	None	David Ctiborsky		
"Stay"	2021	The Kid Laroi	Colin Tilley		
"Essence" (Lyric video)	2021	Wizkid; Tems	None		
"Don't Go"	2021	Skrillex; Don Toliver	Salomon Ligthelm		
"Ghost"	2021	None	Colin Tilley		
"Attention"	2022	Omah Lay	Unknown		
"I Feel Funny"	2022	None	Cole Bennett		
"Honest"	2022	Don Toliver	Cole Bennett		
"Snooze" (Guest Appearance)	2023	SZA	Bradley J. Calder		

== Filmography ==
Title	Year	Role	Notes	Ref.
Justin Bieber: Never Say Never	2011	Himself	Concert film, documentary	
Katy Perry: Part of Me	2012	Himself	Documentary	
Zendaya: Behind the Scenes	2012	Himself	Documentary	
Justin Bieber's Believe	2013	Himself	Concert film, documentary	
Behaving Badly	2014	Prisoner	Cameo appearance	
Lennon or McCartney	2014	Himself	Short documentary film; interview clip	
Purpose: The Movement	2015	Himself	Short film. Composed of a series of video vignettes that accompany the songs from Bieber's Purpose album.	
Zoolander 2	2016	Himself	Cameo appearance	
Bodyguards: Secret Lives from the Watchtower	2016	Himself	Documentary	
Popstar: Never Stop Never Stopping	2016	Himself	Cameo appearance	
The Truth Beneath	Composer	Himself		
Killing Hasselhoff	2017	Himself	Cameo appearance	
The Battleship Island	Composer	Himself		
Changes: The Movement	2020	Himself	Short film. Composed of a series of video vignettes that accompany the songs from Bieber's Changes album.	
Justin Bieber: Our World	2021	Documentary film		
Kids Are Growing Up: A Story About a Kid Named Laroi	2024	Documentary		

== Television ==
Title	Year	Role	Network	Notes	Ref.
True Jackson, VP	2009	Himself	Nickelodeon	"True Concert" (episode)	
CSI: Crime Scene Investigation	2010, 2011	Jason McCann	CBS	Season 11 Episodes 11.1 Shock Waves, 11.15 Targets of Obsession	
Silent Library	2010	Himself	MTV	Episode 203	
School Gyrls	2010	Himself	Nickelodeon	Television film	
Saturday Night Live	2010	Musical guest	NBC	Tina Fey-Justin Bieber	
Extreme Makeover: Home Edition	2011	Himself	ABC	"The Brown Family"	
So Random!	2011	Himself	Disney Channel	"Justin Bieber" (episode)	
Rob Dyrdek's Fantasy Factory	2011	Himself	MTV	"Welcome, Big Black"	
David Haye Versus	2011	Himself	Sky 1	Episode 2	
Punk'd	2012	Himself	MTV	"Justin Bieber" (episode)	
Ridiculousness	2012	Himself	MTV	"Justin Bieber" (episode)	
Saturday Night Live	2013	Host	NBC	"Justin Bieber"	
The Simpsons	2013	Himself	Fox	"The Fabulous Faker Boy"	
Comedy Central Roast	2015	Himself	Comedy Central	"Justin Bieber"	
Repeat After Me	2015	Himself	ABC	Episode 102	
Lip Sync Battle	2015	Himself	Spike	Episode "Deion Sanders vs. Justin Bieber"	
The Doctors	2015	Himself	CBS	Episode 97	
One Love Manchester	2017	Himself	BBC One	Television special showcasing performances by various artists in service of the victims of the Manchester Arena bombing.	
Racist Superman	2018	Canadian Superman	YouTube	Short video	
Justin Bieber: Seasons	2020	Himself	YouTube	Docu-series on Bieber's life post-hiatus from music, marriage, preparation for new music, and battle against Lyme disease.	
Saturday Night Live	2020	Musical guest	NBC	RuPaul-Justin Bieber	
Saturday Night Live	2020	Musical guest	NBC	Issa Rae-Justin Bieber	
Friends: The Reunion	2021	Guest star	HBO Max	Dons Ross Geller's Spud-nik costume	
Dave	2021	Guest star	FXX	Himself	

== Commercials ==
Company, product	Year	Director(s)	Featured song(s)	Description	Ref.
Proactiv	2010	Unknown	None	Bieber explains how he manages being a young man, with other users of the product delivering testimonials.	
Best Buy	2011	Bryan Buckley	"The Barber of Seville, Overture"	Made for Super Bowl XLV, the commercial emphasized a new age of technology with Bieber replacing an obsolete Ozzy Osbourne.	
Girlfriend	2012	Alfredo Flores	"Boyfriend"	Filmed from the perspective of a girl who hopes to attract Bieber by wearing his perfume 'Girlfriend'.	
Macy's	2012	Hank Perlman	"Jingle Bells"	In a Black Friday commercial for Girlfriend, Bieber's recently introduced fragrance, several men squeal in high-pitched voices when he walks by.	
Macy's	2012	Hank Perlman	"Sh Boom"	Set in Macy's flagship Herald Square store in New York City, working with celebrities (several of whom make cameo appearances).	
Macy's	2013	Hank Perlman	"Miracle on 34th Street's; Opening Theme"	With characters reminiscent of Miracle on 34th Street and current celebrities, the store contrasts its current presence from 1947.	
Calvin Klein	2015	Johan Renck	None	A shirtless Bieber plays the drums and takes close-up shots with model Lara Stone, while wearing Calvin Klein products.	
Calvin Klein	2016	Tyrone Lebon	"My Calvins Remix"	Superstars, actors, rappers, artists, models, and street talent showcase the company's spring 2016 global advertising campaign.	
T-Mobile	2017	Marco Castro	None	Bieber stars as a “Celebration Expert” who takes viewers on a journey through the history of touchdown dances alongside New England Patriots tight end Rob Gronkowski and NFL Pro Bowler Terrell Owens for Super Bowl LI.	
SoftBank	2017	Unknown	"What Do You Mean?"	Bieber joins Pikotaro in rejoicing with students and advertising a SoftBank student discount.	
Calvin Klein	2019	Cedric Murac	"Unbelievable"	Bieber joins his wife, other artists, and models to celebrate the company's 50th Anniversary campaign titled 'CK50'.	
Calvin Klein	2020	Bardia Zeinali	None	Artists, actors, rappers, and models star in the company's 2020 "Deal With It" advertising campaign.	
Crocs	2020	Unknown	None	Bieber unveils a new Crocs clog with custom Jibbitz and design elements from his personal clothing brand 'Drew House'.	
Balenciaga	2021	Demna Gvasalia	None	Bieber joins Isabelle Huppert in the company's 2021 advertising campaign.	
Tim Hortons	2021	Unknown	None	Bieber unveils 3 new flavours of Timbits as part of a collaboration titled 'Timbiebs'.	
Tim Hortons	2022	Unknown	None	Bieber unveils his limited edition French Vanilla Cold Brew titled 'Biebs Brew'.	
Vespa	2022	Unknown	None	Bieber unveils an exclusive limited-edition model of the Vespa scooter, in a collaboration titled 'Justin Bieber x Vespa'.	
