= Yum Yum =

Yum Yum may refer to:

== Entertainment ==
- Yum Yum (album), released in 2004 by Boy George's electronica project, "The Twin"
- Yum Yum, the heroine in The Mikado operetta by Gilbert and Sullivan
- Princess Yum-Yum, the heroine in The Thief and the Cobbler film
- Yum-Yum, the female cat in the fictional Cat Who series by Lilian Jackson Braun
- Yum-Yum, the '90s band started by Chris Holmes
- The Yumyum Tree, a 2009 studio album by Ozric Tentacles
- The Yum-Yum Girls, a 1976 film

== Food ==
- Yum-Yum Donuts, a chain of donut shops based in California
- Yum Yum, a glazed hand-twisted rope-shaped doughnut
- Yum Yum, a brand of instant noodles
- Yum yum sauce, an American-Japanese condiment similar to fry sauce

== Places ==
- Yum Yum, Tennessee, United States

== See also ==
- "Yum Yum Yum", a 2014 single by Lip Service
- Yum (disambiguation)
- Blueberry Yum Yum (disambiguation)
- Yummy (disambiguation)
