= Yummy =

Yummy may refer to:

== People ==
- Robert "Yummy" Sandifer, a Black Disciples gang member killed in 1994 at eleven years of age
- Yummy Bingham (born 1986), American R&B singer

== Music ==
- Yummy (KC and the Sunshine Band album), a 2007 album by KC and the Sunshine Band
- Yummy (James album), 2024
- "Yummy" (Chelo song), a song from Chelo's album 360°
- "Yummy" (Gwen Stefani song), a 2006 song from Gwen Stefani's album The Sweet Escape
- "Yummy" (Justin Bieber song), a 2020 song from Justin Bieber's album Changes
- Yummy!, 1990 album by the Hard-Ons
- Yummy!!, 2018 album by the band Kis-My-Ft2

== Film and television ==
- Yummy (film), a 2019 Belgian comedy horror film
- Yummy (Kamen Rider), the fictional monsters from the 2010 Tokusatsu show Kamen Rider OOO

== See also ==
- Yum (disambiguation)
- Yumi (disambiguation)
- Yummy Yummy (disambiguation)
- "Yummy Yummy Yummy", a song first recorded by the Ohio Express in 1968
- Yummy, Yummy, Yummy (album), a 1969 album by Julie London
