= Come Around Me =

2020 song by Justin Bieber

Song by Justin Bieber

from the album Changes
- Released: February 14, 2020
- Length: 3:20
- Label: Def Jam
- Songwriters: Justin Bieber; Jason Boyd; Dominic Jordan; Jimmy Giannos
- Producers: Poo Bear; The Audibles

Dance visual
- "Habitual" on YouTube

"Come Around Me" is a song by Canadian singer Justin Bieber. It was released through Def Jam Recordings as the third track from his fifth studio album, Changes, on February 14, 2020. Released on Valentine's Day, Bieber wrote the song with producers Poo Bear and the Audibles (Dominic Jordan and Jimmy Giannos).

== Background and composition ==
Producer duo the Audibles first created the instrumental to "Come Around Me" and American singer-songwriter and record producer Poo Bear wrote the song in about 15 to 20 minutes. Bieber later recorded his vocals and did the bridge. The song contains samples from producer Alex Lustigs song, "Synth Such Vibes…", a beat that was created on Slice. It also contains some lyrics that Bieber used on his unreleased song, "Stress", which he recorded in 2013. The instrumental of the song was first teased by being used in Bieber's promotional video for 2020, released on December 24, 2019.

== Critical reception ==
Taylor Weatherby of Billboard ranked "Come Around Me" as the eleventh-best song on Changes, deeming it as "kind of like the older brother to 'Yummy'" and even though the two songs are "sonically pretty different, they're both more geared towards Justin's sex life than his love life", compromising that "even if the sex talk is a little too much for some, at least the undulating chorus is infectious". Insider's Courteney Larocca and Callie Ahlgrim also felt that "Come Around Me" was "pretty good" and praised the post-chorus for Bieber's falsetto and the line, "Let's get it in expeditiously" . Writing for Variety, Jeremy Helligar felt that the song "still manages to be gooey and ear-wormy" even though "Bieber is more concerned with setting a mood then pumping out hooks". Rolling Stone's Brittany Spanos opined that "the details of how and when the Biebers will 'get it in expeditiously'" like he said on the song "feel as banal as doing your taxes, and the lyrics sound like they were solely written to be used in #relationshipgoals Instagram posts" and "even when Bieber experiences cheeky moments of wondering 'who taught you how to drive stick,' it sounds more like he is legitimately posing a question about her car-driving skills as opposed to what's going on in the bedroom". Hannah Mylrea of NME wrote that "the repetitive 'Come Around Me' finally feels like it's found some direction towards the end when powerful piano chords and The Weeknd-flecked melodies start, that's when the song tersely ends".

== Dance visual ==
A dance visual for "Come Around Me" was released on March 4, 2020, directed by Nick DeMoura. It starts with three dancers with face masks on at a robbery scene. As they keep dancing as the video goes on, they are joined by more dancers of their crew.

== Credits and personnel ==
Credits adapted from Tidal.

- Justin Bieber – vocals, songwriting
- Poo Bear – production, songwriting, background vocals
- The Audibles
  - Dominic Jordan – production, songwriting
  - Jimmy Giannos – production, songwriting
- Josh Gudwin – production, songwriting, mixing, recording, engineering, vocal production, studio personnel
- Elijah Marrett-Hitch – assistant mixing, studio personnel
- Colin Leonard – mastering, studio personnel
- Chris "TEK" O'Ryan – recording, studio personnel
- Chenao Wang – assistant recording, studio personnel
- Kory Welty – engineering, studio personnel

== Charts ==
Chart performance for "Come Around Me"
Chart (2020)	Peak position
Australia (ARIA)	68
Canada Hot 100 (Billboard)	61
New Zealand Hot Singles (RMNZ)	5
Portugal (AFP)	155
Slovakia Singles Digital (ČNS IFPI)	49
Sweden Heatseeker (Sverigetopplistan)	9
UK Audio Streaming (OCC)	80
US Billboard Hot 100	86
US Hot R&B/Hip-Hop Songs (Billboard)	42

== Certifications ==
Certifications for "Come Around Me"
Region	Certification	Certified units/sales
Australia (ARIA)	Gold	35,000^{‡}
Brazil (Pro-Música Brasil)	Platinum	40,000^{‡}
New Zealand (RMNZ)	Gold	15,000^{‡}
United States (RIAA)	Gold	500,000^{‡}
^{‡} Sales+streaming figures based on certification alone.
