= Get Me (song) =

2020 single by Justin Bieber featuring Kehlani

Promotional single by Justin Bieber featuring Kehlani

from the album Changes
- Released: January 28, 2020
- Genre: R&B
- Length: 3:06
- Label: Def Jam
- Songwriters: Justin Bieber; Kehlani Parrish; Jason Boyd; Matthew Samuels; Anderson Hernandez; Jun Ha Kim
- Producers: Poo Bear; Boi-1da; Vinylz; CVRE

Justin Bieber promotional singles chronology
"I'll Show You" (2015)	"Get Me" (2020)	"I Feel Funny" (2022)

Audio video
- "Get Me" on YouTube

"Get Me" is a song by Canadian singer Justin Bieber, featuring vocals from American singer Kehlani. It was released on January 28, 2020, as the sole promotional single from Bieber's fifth studio album, Changes. Bieber and Kehlani wrote the song alongside producers Poo Bear, Boi-1da, Vinylz, and CVRE, while it was also additionally produced by Jahaan Sweet.

== Background ==
On January 3, 2020, the same day that Bieber released the lead single of Changes, "Yummy", TMZ reported through an article that Kehlani was one of the featured artists to appear on the album. "Get Me" was released the same day that Bieber announced the album. The song was also played on his docu-series, Justin Bieber: Seasons (2020).

== Composition ==
"Get Me" is a mid-tempo R&B love ballad that employs "nocturnal" moombahton beats and a "ha, ha, ha"-filled chorus. According to the sheet music published at Musicnotes.com by Universal Music Publishing Group, the song is composed in 4/4 time and the key of C♯ minor with a tempo of 109 beats per minute. The verses follow a G♯m7–C♯m9–F♯m7 sequence. Musically, the track encompasses "a soulful, stripped back sound" with sparse production that features Fender Rhodes washes, DJ scratches, and a simple bass-and-percussion bed occasionally enhanced by touches of electric piano. Stereogum's Tom Breihan wrote that the song draws from 1990s R&B and "Drake-style architectural moodiness". Bieber and Kehlani's vocals, described as "soft" and "velvety" by Sara Delgado of Teen Vogue, share smooth tones and are pushed to the forefront of the track. The two go back and forth on the "smooth and sexy" duet, with Kehlani adding soulful harmonies and lead lines to the song, while Bieber contributes some vocal flourishes toward the end.

== Credits and personnel ==
Credits adapted from Tidal.

- Justin Bieber – lead vocals, songwriting
- Kehlani – featured vocals, songwriting
- Poo Bear – production, songwriting
- Boi-1da – production, songwriting
- Vinylz – production, songwriting
- CVRE – production, songwriting, background vocals
- Jahaan Sweet – additional production
- Josh Gudwin – mixing, recording
- Chris "TEK" O'Ryan – recording
- Mark Parfitt - recording

== Charts ==
Chart (2020)	Peak position
Australia (ARIA)	61
Canada Hot 100 (Billboard)	48
Greece (IFPI)	43
Ireland (IRMA)	58
Lithuania (AGATA)	41
Netherlands (Single Top 100)	77
New Zealand Hot Singles (RMNZ)	4
Portugal (AFP)	85
Slovakia Singles Digital (ČNS IFPI)	78
Sweden (Sverigetopplistan)	80
Switzerland (Schweizer Hitparade)	88
UK Singles (Official Charts)	61
US Billboard Hot 100	93
US Hot R&B/Hip-Hop Songs (Billboard)	44
US Rolling Stone Top 100	65

== Certifications ==
Certifications for "Get Me"
Region	Certification	Certified units/sales
Brazil (Pro-Música Brasil)	Gold	20,000^{‡}
^{‡} Sales+streaming figures based on certification alone.
