= Yumi (disambiguation) =

Yumi is the Japanese word for a bow (weapon).

Yumi may also refer to:

- Yumi (name), a feminine Japanese and Korean given name
- Yumi, Yumi, Yumi, national anthem of Vanuatu
- Yumi, a fictional P-pop girl group from the Philippine drama series Born to Shine

YUMI may refer to:

- Your Universal Multiboot Integrator, a software for bootable live USB flash drive creation, related to Universal USB Installer.

== See also ==
- Yummy (disambiguation)
