= Yum =

Yum may refer to:

== People ==
- Ren (surname), romanized as Yum or Yam in Cantonese
- Yum Dong-kyun (born in 1950), South Korean boxer
- Yum Jung-ah (born in 1972), South Korean actress

== Other uses ==
- Quechan language, (ISO 639 language code "yum")
- YUM, the ISO 4217 code for the Yugoslav dinar in Serbia and Montenegro between 1994 and 2003
- Yum! Brands, a corporation that operates Taco Bell, KFC, and Pizza Hut
- Yuma International Airport (IATA code YUM), in Yuma, Arizona
- yum (software), an open-source command-line package-management tool for Linux operating systems
- "Yum", a song by Slowthai from the 2023 album Ugly

== See also ==
- Yum Yum (disambiguation)
- Yuma (disambiguation)
- Yummy (disambiguation)
