= Intentions (Justin Bieber song) =

2020 single by Justin Bieber featuring Quavo

Single by Justin Bieber featuring Quavo

from the album Changes
- Released: February 7, 2020
- Genre: R&B; pop; trap
- Length: 3:32
- Label: Def Jam
- Songwriters: Justin Bieber; Quavious Marshall; Jason Boyd; Dominic Jordan; Jimmy Giannos
- Producers: Poo Bear; The Audibles

Justin Bieber singles chronology
"Yummy" (2020)	"Intentions" (2020)	"Lean on Me" (2020)

Quavo singles chronology
"Had Enough" (2019)	"Intentions" (2020)	"Big Drip" (remix) (2020)

Music video
- "Intentions" on YouTube

"Intentions" is a song by Canadian singer Justin Bieber featuring American rapper Quavo. It was released as the second single from Bieber's fifth studio album, Changes, on February 7, 2020. On March 19, 2020, Bieber released an acoustic version of the song, a solo version that does not include Quavo. In contrast to "Yummy", "Intentions" received positive reviews from music critics, reached number one in Malaysia, New Zealand, and Singapore, reached the top ten in several countries including Australia, Canada, Ireland, the United Kingdom, and the United States, and reached the top forty in many additional countries. The music video for "Intentions" was nominated for an MTV Video Music Award.

== Background ==
The title of the song was first revealed in the episode titled "Bieber Is Back" of the YouTube docu-series Justin Bieber: Seasons that was released on January 27, 2020, in which "Intentions" was written down on a note on a board containing candidate tracks for Changes. On February 4, 2020, Bieber posted a tweet stating: "Big announcement tomorrow". He teased the song and the music video by posting a short trailer on twitter on the following day. The single was released along with the music video two days later. When asked why he named the song "Intentions" during an MTV interview, Bieber said: "I think a lot of us forget to set intentions. As humans, we get caught up in our everyday worries and struggles. What we set our intentions on makes a difference on the outcome of our life and the quality of life that we live".

This is the third collaboration between the two artists, following DJ Khaled and Chance the Rapper's hit singles "I'm the One" in 2017 (which also features Lil Wayne) and "No Brainer" in 2018.

== Composition and lyrics ==
"Intentions" is a pop and R&B song that is performed in the key of A major, with the vocals spanning from E_{3} to C♯_{5}. Lyrically, Bieber gives compliments to his wife, American model Hailey Bieber, and Quavo praises his then-girlfriend, fellow American rapper Saweetie, respectively. The lyric, "Got that ring just like Toronto", alludes to the Toronto Raptors' 2019 NBA Championship victory.

== Promotion ==
Bieber published a lyric video to his channel on February 10, 2020. Later a dance video for "Intentions" was published as a part of the project CHANGES:The Movement. Bieber debuted the song with Quavo during Saturday Night Live on February 8, 2020. He and Quavo also performed "Intentions" on February 14, 2020, the day the album was released, during The Tonight Show Starring Jimmy Fallon, and on The Ellen DeGeneres Show on March 4, 2020. He and Quavo also performed an acoustic version of "Intentions" at Global Goal: Unite for Our Future which was organized by Global Citizen on June 27, 2020.

== Critical reception ==
Music critics complimented Bieber's vocal performance and the catchiness of the song while some praised the positive messages depicted in the music video. "Intentions" was named the 32nd best songs of 2020 by Billboard and the 45th by Uproxx. "Intentions" was also named as one of the best summer songs of 2020 by Marie Claire. "Intentions" was nominated for "Best Pop Video" at the 2020 MTV Video Music Awards.

=== Year-end lists ===
Publications	List	Rank	Ref.
Billboard	The 100 Best Songs of 2020	73	

== Commercial performance ==
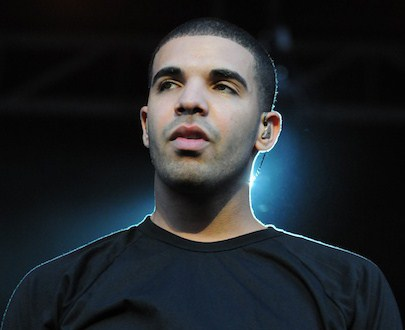
Bieber tied Drake's record of most top-five singles since 2010 in Billboard Hot 100 history; both of them have scored sixteen top-five hits since 2010 on the chart.

In Australia, the single topped the charts 12 weeks after its debut giving Bieber his eighth chart-topper, making Bieber the second most successful act in the history of the TMN Hot 100 overall behind Pink joining Katy Perry, Ed Sheeran, and Delta Goodrem to reach the milestone while the single peaked at number two in the ARIA Singles Chart. In New Zealand, the song peaked at number one for two weeks, giving Bieber his eighth number one hit, and second from the album Changes, making it the first album of the 2020s decade to have more than one chart topper in the country. "Intentions" also topped the charts in other countries including Singapore and Malaysia. On the UK Singles Chart "Intentions" peaked at number eight giving Bieber his 19th top-ten hit and Quavo's fourth - which is also his third top-ten single in the UK via a collaboration with Bieber.

In the United States, "Intentions" debuted at number 11 on the Billboard Hot 100 chart dated February 22, 2020, making it the "Hot Shot Debut" of the week. The following week the song entered the top ten by rising up-to number nine giving Bieber his 18th top-ten entry and Quavo's sixth. It also marked Quavo's third top-ten single for a collaboration with Bieber. 16 weeks later, "Intentions" peaked at number five, giving Bieber his 16th top-five hit and Quavo's third – of which all are from collaborations with Bieber. Bieber tied Drake as the artist with most top-five hits since 2010 with both having 16 each surpassing Bruno Mars and Rihanna who have scored 15 each. As of July 2020, the song has spent 19 non-consecutive weeks inside the top ten and is one of the longest-running top-ten singles released in 2020. It also debuted at number one on the Hot R&B Songs chart, marking Bieber's third number-one on the said chart, following "Yummy", which "Intentions" dethroned. Bieber became the fourth artist to replace himself from the number-one spot on Hot R&B Songs chart, joining the likes of Drake, the Weeknd, and Khalid. The single also debuted simultaneously atop both the R&B Streaming Songs chart as well as the R&B Digital Song Sales chart marking Bieber's third topper and Quavo's second, following "No Brainer" by DJ Khaled, which also featured the two artists and Chance the Rapper on the former chart, while marking Bieber's seventh topper and Quavo's second, followed by "No Brainer" on the latter chart where Bieber broke a tie with Drake and Rihanna for the second-most leaders on the latter chart overall behind The Weeknd. On the chart dated June 27, 2020, the song reached number one on the Pop Songs airplay chart, making it Bieber's seventh leader and Quavo's second; Bieber also becomes the youngest male artist (and third overall behind Rihanna and Taylor Swift) to obtain seven chart-toppers on the said chart.

== Music video ==
=== Background ===
The music video premiered on Bieber's YouTube channel the same day of the song. Filming took place at Alexandria house and California state University, Northridge's Oviatt Library. Directed by Michael D. Ratner, the video previews Bieber (along with Quavo) drawing attention to the difficulties of women and children in need while raising awareness and funds for Alexandria House, whose mission is to help them move from crisis to stability.

Speaking on the background of the music video, Bieber stated that he wanted to shine a light on social issues that are happening in the world that people are often overlooking and that he wanted to make people aware of the hurting and broken people that are suffering in humanity. He then posted a short version of the music video, only the parts with the song playing, on February 12, 2020. As of January 14, 2021, the video has crossed 291 million views on the platform.

=== Synopsis ===
The music video commences with the introduction of Bahri, who was born in Saudi Arabia and who is hoping to be the first from her family to graduate from college and whose intention is to help kids who are less fortunate; Marcy, who was raised in foster care, suffered from early motherhood, and whose intentions are to help foster youth find the resources they need; and Angela, who has experienced homelessness and who later sings her own verse in the music video while her intention is to giveback; spread awareness and tell the stories of homeless women and children through her art. Throughout the music video, Bieber and Quavo are seen helping Bahri, Marcy and Angela to achieve their goals and expectations. Bieber gifts Bahri with a new car so she won't have to worry about getting to class, Marcy and her family with backpacks full of supplies, and Angela with studio time so that she can spread awareness about homelessness to a wider audience in an effective way. Bieber and Quavo are also seen motivating them and uplifting their mood while dancing with them as well as raising funds for them. At the end of the video, Judith Yvonne who is the founding director of Alexandria house talks about her intentions to speak about the injustices and the need for equity.

The video ends with a message of gratitude to the shelter reading that "Thank you to the Alexandria House for opening your doors and your hearts to Bahri, Marcy and Angela and the entire community in times of need," followed by the announcement that Bieber's newly established INTENTIONS Fund has donated $200,000 to the shelter in order to "support these women and the dreams of the families you support."

=== Impact ===
The video sparked an increase in donations to the women's shelter. The video helped to raise over $10,000 for the charity just within the first 3 days of its release.

== Credits and personnel ==
Credits adapted from Tidal.

- Justin Bieber – lead vocals, songwriting
- Quavo – featured vocals, songwriting
- Poo Bear – production, songwriting, backing vocals
- The Audibles
  - Dominic Jordan – production, songwriting
  - Jimmy Giannos – production, songwriting
- Josh Gudwin – vocal producer, recording engineer, studio personnel
- Chris "TEK" O'Ryan – recording engineer, studio personnel

== Charts ==
=== Weekly charts ===
Chart (2020–2021)	Peak position
Australia (ARIA)	2
Austria (Ö3 Austria Top 40)	11
Belgium (Ultratop 50 Flanders)	17
Belgium (Ultratip Bubbling Under Wallonia)	1
Bolivia (Monitor Latino)	12
Canada Hot 100 (Billboard)	4
Canada AC (Billboard)	2
Canada CHR/Top 40 (Billboard)	3
Canada Hot AC (Billboard)	1
Colombia (National-Report)	67
Croatia (HRT)	45
Czech Republic Singles Digital (ČNS IFPI)	8
Denmark (Tracklisten)	4
Estonia (Eesti Tipp-40)	12
Finland (Suomen virallinen lista)	20
France (SNEP)	58
Germany (GfK)	23
Global 200 (Billboard)	65
Greece (IFPI)	12
Hungary (Single Top 40)	14
Hungary (Stream Top 40)	11
Iceland (Tónlistinn)	4
Ireland (IRMA)	7
Italy (FIMI)	37
Japan Hot 100 (Billboard)	62
Lebanon (OLT20)	19
Malaysia (RIM)	1
Mexico (Billboard Mexican Airplay)	26
Netherlands (Dutch Top 40)	8
Netherlands (Single Top 100)	4
New Zealand (Recorded Music NZ)	1
Norway (VG-lista)	8
Portugal (AFP)	17
Scottish Singles Sales (Official Charts)	34
Singapore (RIAS)	1
Slovakia Singles Digital (ČNS IFPI)	7
Slovenia (SloTop50)	43
Spain (Promusicae)	45
Sweden (Sverigetopplistan)	9
Switzerland (Schweizer Hitparade)	13
UK Singles (Official Charts)	8
US Billboard Hot 100	5
US Adult Contemporary (Billboard)	7
US Adult Pop Airplay (Billboard)	4
US Dance Airplay (Billboard)	5
US Hot R&B/Hip-Hop Songs (Billboard)	4
US Pop Airplay (Billboard)	1
US Rhythmic Airplay (Billboard)	5
US Rolling Stone Top 100	3

=== Year-end charts ===
Chart (2020)	Position
Australia (ARIA)	9
Belgium (Ultratop Flanders)	74
Canada (Canadian Hot 100)	11
Denmark (Tracklisten)	23
Hungary (Stream Top 40)	64
Iceland (Tónlistinn)	31
Ireland (IRMA)	40
Netherlands (Dutch Top 40)	58
Netherlands (Single Top 100)	26
New Zealand (Recorded Music NZ)	14
Portugal (AFP)	85
Romania (Airplay 100)	61
Sweden (Sverigetopplistan)	86
Switzerland (Schweizer Hitparade)	78
UK Singles (OCC)	30
US Billboard Hot 100	17
US Adult Contemporary (Billboard)	15
US Adult Top 40 (Billboard)	12
US Dance/Mix Show Airplay (Billboard)	29
US Hot R&B/Hip-Hop Songs (Billboard)	9
US Mainstream Top 40 (Billboard)	9
US Rhythmic (Billboard)	29
Venezuela Airplay (Monitor Latino)	100

Chart (2021)	Position
Global 200 (Billboard)	151
US Adult Contemporary (Billboard)	22

== Certifications ==
Region	Certification	Certified units/sales
Australia (ARIA)	6× Platinum	420,000^{‡}
Belgium (BRMA)	Gold	20,000^{‡}
Brazil (Pro-Música Brasil)	2× Diamond	320,000^{‡}
Canada (Music Canada)	5× Platinum	400,000^{‡}
Denmark (IFPI Danmark)	2× Platinum	180,000^{‡}
France (SNEP)	Gold	100,000^{‡}
Germany (BVMI)	Gold	200,000^{‡}
Italy (FIMI)	Gold	35,000^{‡}
New Zealand (RMNZ)	5× Platinum	150,000^{‡}
Norway (IFPI Norway)	Platinum	60,000^{‡}
Poland (ZPAV)	Platinum	50,000^{‡}
Portugal (AFP)	Platinum	10,000^{‡}
Spain (Promusicae)	Platinum	60,000^{‡}
United Kingdom (BPI)	Platinum	600,000^{‡}
United States (RIAA)	4× Platinum	4,000,000^{‡}
Streaming
Japan (RIAJ)	Gold	50,000,000^{†}
^{‡} Sales+streaming figures based on certification alone.^{†} Streaming-only figures based on certification alone.

== Release history ==
Country	Date	Format	Label	Ref.
Various	February 7, 2020	Digital download; streaming	Def Jam	
Italy	February 14, 2020	Contemporary hit radio	Universal	

== See also ==
- Justin Bieber: Seasons (2020)
- List of number-one songs of 2020 (Malaysia)
- List of number-one singles from the 2020s (New Zealand)
- List of number-one songs of 2020 (Singapore)
- List of Billboard Hot 100 top-ten singles in 2020
- List of Billboard Mainstream Top 40 number-one songs of 2020
- List of UK top-ten singles in 2020
- List of top 10 singles in 2020 (Ireland)
