= Yumi (name) =

- Gender: Female

Origin
- Meaning: Different meanings depending on the kanji or hanja used
- Region of origin: Japan and Korea

Yumi is a feminine Japanese and Korean given name.

== Japanese name ==
Yumi (ゆみ, ユミ) is a common feminine Japanese given name which is occasionally used as a surname.

=== Orthography ===
Yumi can be written using different kanji characters and as a given name can mean:

- 由美, "origin/history, beauty"
- 裕美, "abundance, beauty"
- 夕実, "evening, fruition"
- 優美, "tenderness, beauty"'
- 裕未, "abundance, less than"
- 悠美, "permanence, beauty"
- 祐美, "savior, beauty"
- 由実, "origin/history, fruition"
- 有美, "exist, beauty"
- 夕美, "evening, beauty"
- 友美, "friend, beauty"

The given name can also be written in hiragana or katakana.

=== Given name ===
- Yumi Adachi (安達 祐実; born 1981), Japanese actress and singer
- Yumi Adachi (synchronised swimmer) (足立 夢実; born 1989), Japanese synchronized swimmer
- Yumi Asō (奥村 由美), Japanese actress
- Yumi Hara (原 由実, born 1985), Japanese voice actress
- Yumi Hotta (堀田 由美), Japanese manga artist
- Yumi Inomata (猪又 由美; born 1968), Japanese cross-country skier
- Yumi Iwabuchi (岩渕 有美), Japanese Olympic softball player
- Yumi Kaeriyama (帰山 由美; born 1967), Japanese speed skater
- Yumi Kakazu (嘉数 由美, born 1973), Japanese voice actress
- Yumi Kida (貴田 裕美), Japanese long-distance swimmer
- Yumi Kobayashi (小林優美), Japanese fashion model
- Yumi Kokamo (小鴨 由水), retired female long-distance runner from Japan
- Yumi Kumakura (熊倉 由美), Japanese volleyball player
- Yumi Maruyama (丸山 由美), Japanese former Olympic volleyball player
- Yumi Matsutoya (松任谷 由実), Japanese singer
- Yumi Matsuzawa (松澤 由美), Japanese singer
- Yumi Morio (河合 由美), Japanese voice actress
- Yumi Nakashima (中島 優美), Japanese singer
- Yumi Ohka (阿部 由美子), Japanese professional wrestler
- Yumi Rodrigues (born 2008), Brazilian rhythmic gymnast
- Yumi Shimura (志村 由美; born 1982), Japanese voice actress
- Yumi Shirakawa (白川 由美), former Japanese actress
- Yumi Stynes, Australian disc jockey for the Australian Channel V
- Yumi Sugimoto (杉本 有美), Japanese actress
- Yumi Suzuki (鈴木 夕湖; born 1991), Japanese curler
- Yumi Takada (高田 由美), Japanese voice actress
- Yumi Tōma (冬馬 由美 (吉田 由美), Japanese voice actress and singer
- Yumi Watanabe (渡邊 由美; born 1970), Japanese women's footballer
- Yumi Yoshimura (吉村 由美), the second half of the singing duo Puffy AmiYumi
- Yumi Yoshiyuki (吉行由美), Japanese film director, actress, and screenwriter

=== Surname ===
- Kaoru Yumi (由美かおる), Japanese actress as a stage name

=== Fictional characters ===
- Yumi, Otakuthon mascot
- Yumi (Ape Escape), a character in the video game Ape Escape
- Yumi Yoshimura, a character in the Japanese-American animated television series Hi Hi Puffy AmiYumi
- Yumi Fukuzawa (福沢 祐巳), the main character from the novel, manga, and anime series Maria-sama ga Miteru
- Yumi Ishiyama, a main character in the French animated television series Code Lyoko and Code Lyoko: Evolution
- Yumi Tsoi, an inconsistently-minded, non-carbon alien character. Lives entirely in Artem Syrmolotov's imagination
- Farmer Yumi, on the animated television show Paw Patrol
- Azusa Yumi (弓 梓), a character from the anime and manga series Soul Eater
- Sayaka Yumi (弓 さやか), a character from the anime and manga series Mazinger Z
- Yumi Omura (大村裕美) and yumi the persocom, two characters in the manga and anime series Chobits
- Yumi Ozawa, a character from Persona 4
- Yumi Sakata, a character in shōjo manga series Doubt!!
- Yumi Sawamura (澤村 由美), a character in the action-adventure video game Yakuza
- Yumi Miyamoto, a character from the Detective Conan manga and anime series
- Corporal Yumi Nagumo (南雲弓), the main character of Marine Corps Yumi manga series. Uses the kanji 弓 "bow".
- Yumi Komagata, a character from anime and manga series Rurouni Kenshin
- Yumi from the Senran Kagura fighting video game franchise
- Aiko Yumi, a Japanese college professor and a dateable character in the dating simulation videogame HuniePop
- Yumi, a recruitable crew member in Need for Speed: Carbon.

== Korean name ==
- Yumi
- Hangul: 유미
- RR: Yumi
- MR: Yumi

Yumi (유미), also spelled Yoomi, is a Korean given name.

=== People ===
- Yumi Hogan (born 1959), South Korean-born American artist and former first lady of Maryland
- Ha Yoo-mi (born 1963), South Korean actress
- Kim Yoo-mi (actress) (born 1980), South Korean actress
- Han Yoo-mi (born 1982), South Korean volleyball player
- Hwang Yu-mi (born 1983), South Korean badminton player
- Jung Yu-mi (actress, born 1983), South Korean actress
- Jeong Yu-mi (actress, born 1984), South Korean actress
- Jeon Yu-mi (born 1988), South Korean field hockey player
- Kim Yu-mi (beauty pageant titleholder) (born 1990), South Korean beauty pageant titleholder
- Kang Yu-mi (footballer) (born 1991), South Korean football player
- Lee Yoo-mi (born 1994), South Korean actress
- Patty Yumi Cottrell (born 1981), South Korean-born American writer
- Kang Yu-mi (comedian) (born 1983), South Korean comedian

=== Fictional characters ===
- Kim Yumi, the titular protagonist of South Korean webtoon and drama Yumi's Cells

== Chinese name ==
=== People ===
- Yumi Chung (born 2006), Hong Kong-born Filipino singer and actress

== See also ==
- Yumi
- Yumi (disambiguation)
