= Blueberry Yum Yum =

Blueberry Yum Yum may refer to:

- "Blueberry Yum Yum", a song by Ludacris from the 2004 album The Red Light District
- A specific variety of marijuana
