= Changes (Justin Bieber album) =

Studio album by Justin Bieber
- Released: February 14, 2020
- Genres: Pop; R&B
- Length: 47:56
- Labels: Def Jam; RBMG
- Producers: Boi-1da; CVRE; Harv; Jahaan Sweet; Josh Gudwin; Joshua Williams; Kid Culture; Laxcity; Philip Beaudreau; Pierre; Poo Bear; Sasha Sirota; Sons of Sonix; Tainy; The Audibles; The Messengers; Tom Strahle; Vinylz

Justin Bieber chronology
Purpose (2015)	Changes (2020)	Justice (2021)

Singles from Changes
- 1. "Yummy" Released: January 3, 2020; 2. "Intentions" Released: February 7, 2020

Changes is the fifth studio album by the Canadian singer Justin Bieber. It was released through Def Jam Recordings and RBMG on February 14, 2020. The album features guest appearances from Quavo, Post Malone, Clever, Lil Dicky, Travis Scott, Kehlani, and Summer Walker. Production was handled by Poo Bear on every track, Sasha Sirota, Tainy, Josh Gudwin, the Audibles, Kid Culture, Harv, Pierre, Laxcity, Boi-1da, Vinylz, CVRE, Jahaan Sweet, Philip Beaudreau, Tom Strahle, the Messengers, Sons of Sonix, and Joshua Williams. It was released on Valentine's Day and serves as the follow-up to Bieber's previous album, Purpose (2015). Changes is a pop and R&B album that contains elements of trap music.

Changes was supported by two US Billboard Hot 100 top-five singles: "Yummy" and "Intentions". "Get Me", which features Kehlani, was released as the sole promotional single. On January 28, 2020. For additional promotion of the album, Bieber's 10-episode docu-series, Justin Bieber: Seasons premiered on January 27, 2020. The series was described as an in-depth look on his musical creation process. On February 8, 2020, Bieber performed his first Saturday Night Live performance in seven years.

The album debuted atop the U.S. Billboard 200 chart, selling 231,000 album-equivalent units within its first week, which was considerably less than the first-week sales of Purpose (2015), which moved 649,000 units. Bieber released a series of dance videos for each of the tracks on the album, titled "Changes: The Movement". The singer's 2021 Changes album tour was canceled due to the COVID-19 pandemic. Bieber later embarked on the Justice World Tour to promote Changes and its successor, Justice (2021). The album received mixed reviews from music critics, many of whom favored Bieber's vocal performance and certain production elements, but criticized the album's lyricism and the lack of variation between tracks. At the 63rd Grammy Awards, Changes was nominated for Best Pop Vocal Album, while "Yummy" was nominated for Best Pop Solo Performance. It has since been certified platinum by the Recording Industry Association of America (RIAA).

== Background ==
At the 2019 Coachella Valley Music and Arts Festival, Bieber joined American singer Ariana Grande on stage to perform his 2015 single, "Sorry", which he then announced that a new album was coming soon. On October 27, 2019, Bieber announced that he would release his upcoming album before Christmas if his Instagram post reached 20 million likes; however, it failed to do so. The post has since been deleted and the release was consequently postponed.

== Songs ==
"Running Over"
A sample of "Running Over", showcasing the album's electro-R&B sound and themes, with a rap verse by Lil Dicky.

Changes kicks off with the opening track, "All Around Me", which sees Bieber using metaphors to profess his love for his wife, Hailey Bieber, singing, "Anything's possible since you made my heart melt / Gave me the best hand that I'd ever been dealt". On the next track, "Habitual", Bieber describes unconditional love. "Come Around Me" features lyrics about getting sexual with his significant other. The fourth track, "Intentions" sees Bieber and featured artist Quavo give compliments to their love interests. The fifth track, "Yummy" is another sex-driven track that also details how attractive his wife is. On "Available", Bieber compares to the "soft-boy" style of Drake, asking when she is available for him. The title track features Bieber sing about how human beings go through changes on a regular basis and how his changes have affected him, while delivering a short outro that features him praising God.

== Release and promotion ==
The lead single of the album, "Yummy", was released on January 3, 2020, and peaked within the top 10 in numerous countries, debuting at number two on the Billboard Hot 100 chart in the United States. It was remixed a month later on February 3, 2020, with American singer Summer Walker. The album title along with its cover were revealed on January 28, 2020. The announcement was accompanied by the release of the promotional single "Get Me", featuring American singer Kehlani. The second official single, "Intentions", featuring American rapper Quavo, was released on February 7, 2020.

On February 8, 2020, Bieber performed his first Saturday Night Live performance in seven years. He was introduced by the host RuPaul, before performing "Yummy" and "Intentions", with Quavo there to perform his verse in "Intentions".

=== Justin Bieber: Seasons ===
The 10-episode docu-series, Justin Bieber: Seasons premiered on January 27, 2020, sharing insights about his personal struggles including battling with health issues and overcoming drug addiction while detailing his return to music after cancelling the American stadium leg of his Purpose World Tour in 2017. The series was described as an in-depth look on his musical creation process.

=== Justice World Tour ===
The album was originally going to be supported by the Changes Tour. The tour was scheduled to begin on May 14, 2020, in Seattle at CenturyLink Field, but on April 1, 2020, it was announced that the tour would be postponed due to the COVID-19 pandemic. On July 23, 2020, Bieber announced rescheduled dates for the then called Justin Bieber World Tour slated for 2021, starting on June 2, 2021, in San Diego at Pechanga Arena. On May 6, 2021, Bieber announced rescheduled dates for the tour, now called Justice World Tour. Bieber was due to tour until March 2023, until he cancelled the tour after a performance in Rio de Janeiro in September 2022, due to health concerns.

== Critical reception ==
Professional ratings
Aggregate scores
Source	Rating
AnyDecentMusic?	5.5/10
Metacritic	57/100
Review scores
Source	Rating
AllMusic	3.5/5 stars
Clash	5/10
Evening Standard	2/5 stars
The Guardian	3/5 stars
The Independent	2/5 stars
NME	2/5 stars
Pitchfork	4.5/10
Rolling Stone	2/5 stars
Sputnikmusic	3/5
The Times	2/5 stars

Though Bieber's vocal performance was praised, many criticized the album's repetitive tone and lyrical content. At Metacritic, which assigns a normalized rating out of 100 to reviews from mainstream publications, the album received an average score of 57, based on sixteen reviews, indicating "mixed or average reviews".

Rolling Stone listed it among the worst albums of 2020, saying that "Minus “Intentions”, the album is pure filler", saying that it's "so low quality and lacking any inspiration". Writing for AllMusic, Andy Kellman gave the "R&B-pop" album an overall positive review, particularly commending Bieber's vocal skills, describing his falsetto pleas as "neither bitter nor entitled, strictly genuine and adult". Mikael Wood of the Los Angeles Times defined the album as "a low-key set of gentle electro-R&B jams that depicts his relationship with Hailey Baldwin, as a refuge from the unkind world he's still not quite ready to reenter". Noting the trap beats prevalent in the album, Wood commented that "the sprinkling of on-trend trap drums indicate he's [Bieber is] thinking about it, as do streaming-bait guest spots by Post Malone and Travis Scott". Variety's Jeremy Helligar wrote that Bieber "never sounded better, or more in love, but the nonstop bedroom romanticism doesn't leave much room for exploring demons or expressing joy", expanding that Bieber's voice and the production are "flawless", and "his soul is in the right place", but there's "something airless about the album, too, like he could have left the window open a crack to let some sunshine in". Helligar compared the sonic cohesiveness of Changes to that of Ariana Grande's fifth studio album, Thank U, Next (2019).

Rating the album two stars, Rolling Stone's Brittany Spanos defined Changes as a "one-note toast to marital happiness" that is "sweet and tender, but ultimately shallow", stating that the tracks "are not bad, exactly, but they're almost universally forgettable, with little of the catchiness that's been Bieber's hallmark in the past". Spanos called the album as the "honeymoon phase in R&Bieber form", thus "sweet, uncomplicated, and maybe just a bit hard to imagine lasting forever", with Bieber's "charming malleability as an artist" missing. She added that the album is devoid of the "dangerous eroticism" of Bieber's 2013 project, Journals. Insider's Courteney Larocca and Callie Ahlgrim were favourable towards Bieber's "pristine" vocal performance, but dismissed the "subpar" lyrics, concluding Changes is "ultimately a snooze fest". They pointed out "Habitual" as "easily the best track" on the album, while "All Around Me" is "underwhelming" as the opening track. Emma Garland of Vice commented: "Each track is built on a simple hook or a looping beat, in favor of subtle melodies and lots of repetition, that laid back pace gives his voice room to luxuriate, but the songs often fall flat", with "no tension, no build". She highlighted the "formulaic arrangements and wandering melodies", which struggle "to hit home in a major way", like Purpose did.

In a two-star review, Roisin O'Connor of The Independent stated that Changes "isn't so much an album that would rile you to the point of turning it off. Rather, it washes over you, with its mostly average beats and seemingly random cluster of guest features", adding that it is "full of vague platitudes about love from a singer who has yet to grow up". O'Connor concluded that Bieber "hasn't come all that far" since the days of "Baby", as "a number of songs about his new wife Hailey Baldwin are so uninspired that he may as well be declaring his love for a household appliance". Rating the album two stars, Hannah Mylrea of NME wrote that Bieber's "limp comeback" results in a collection of "a knackering, loved-up slog lacking substance", that is "overly reliant on trendy production and profound(ish) romantic proclamations". She added that it is "a disappointing comeback from an artist who has a track record in creating hits", as it is "one romp that never reaches climax". Evening Standard's David Smyth expressed his disappointment in the album's subject matter, but complimented its production: "In fact, so single-minded is his [Bieber] approach this time that it feels like she's [Baldwin] his only intended audience", and thus Bieber's audience at his tour "are going to be underwhelmed by the unchanging, lounging pace of the new material, gently ticking beats and lack of memorable choruses".

Rating the album a 4.5 out of 10, Jayson Greene of Pitchfork wrote that "Changes settles into a middle-distance, stream-friendly murmur that is more sleepy than salacious", adding that its songs "are all cold angles and frictionless surfaces, devoid of intimacy and heat". He pointed out that "nearly every song on Changes resembles every other in tempo, arrangement, and often in lyrics, which seem to be sourced from the same 10 or 15 pastel candy hearts". Writing for Clash, Nick Roseblade opined that the main problem with Changes is that "it isn't exciting or dynamic and suffers from dragging in places", citing the "lack of variation" on the album, as a reason.

In June 2020, Billboard named Changes as one of "The 50 best albums of 2020 (So Far)".

== Commercial performance ==
Changes debuted at number one on the US Billboard 200 with 231,000 album-equivalent units, including 126,000 pure album sales in its first week. It is Bieber's seventh US number-one album. Bieber became the youngest soloist to have seven US number-one albums at the age of 25 with the record being previously held by Elvis Presley at the age of 26. The album's tracks earned a total of 135 million on-demand US streams in its first week. In its second week, the album dropped to number four on the chart, earning an additional 66,000 units. In its third week, the album dropped to number six on the chart, earning 62,000 units.

It additionally debuted atop the Canadian Albums Chart as well as the UK Albums Chart, where it became Bieber's second number-one album.

According to the International Federation of the Phonographic Industry (IFPI), Changes was the 8th best selling album of 2020 globally. Aided by Changes, Bieber placed at number nine on the 2020s top global artists list by IFPI.

== Track listing ==
Changes track listing
No.	Title	Writer(s)	Producer(s)	Length
1.	"All Around Me"	Justin Bieber; Jason Boyd; Sasha Sirota	Poo Bear; Sirota	2:16
2.	"Habitual"	Bieber; J. Boyd; Marco Masís; Joshua Gudwin	Poo Bear; Tainy; Josh Gudwin	2:48
3.	"Come Around Me"	Bieber; J. Boyd; Dominic Jordan; Jimmy Giannos	Poo Bear; The Audibles	3:20
4.	"Intentions" (featuring Quavo)	Bieber; Quavious Marshall; J. Boyd; Jordan; Giannos	Poo Bear; The Audibles	3:32
5.	"Yummy"	Bieber; J. Boyd; Sirota; Daniel Hackett; Ashley Boyd	Poo Bear; Sirota; Kid Culture	3:28
6.	"Available"	Bieber; J. Boyd; Bernard Harvey; JaVale McGee; Derrick Milano; A. Boyd	Poo Bear; Harv; Pierre	3:15
7.	"Forever" (featuring Post Malone and Clever)	Bieber; Austin Post; Joshua Huie; J. Boyd; Harvey; Louis Bell; Billy Walsh; Ali Darwish	Poo Bear; Harv	3:39
8.	"Running Over" (featuring Lil Dicky)	Bieber; David Burd; J. Boyd; Jordan; Giannos; Joshua Mbewe	Poo Bear; The Audibles; Laxcity	2:59
9.	"Take It Out on Me"	Bieber; J. Boyd; Hackett; Daniel Daley; Anthony Jefferies; Majid Al Maskati; Timothy Mosley; Stephen Garrett; Maneesh Bidaye; Benjamin Bush	Poo Bear; Kid Culture	2:58
10.	"Second Emotion" (featuring Travis Scott)	Bieber; Jacques Webster II; J. Boyd; Jordan; Giannos	Poo Bear; The Audibles	3:22
11.	"Get Me" (featuring Kehlani)	Bieber; Kehlani Parrish; J. Boyd; Matthew Samuels; Anderson Hernandez; Jun Ha Kim	Poo Bear; Boi-1da; Vinylz; CVRE; Jahaan Sweet^{[a]}	3:05
12.	"E.T.A."	Bieber; J. Boyd; Gudwin; Philip Beaudreau; Tom Strahle	Poo Bear; Gudwin; Beaudreau; Strahle	2:56
13.	"Changes"	Bieber; J. Boyd; Nasri Atweh; Adam Messinger	Poo Bear; The Messengers	2:15
14.	"Confirmation"	Bieber; J. Boyd; Moses Samuels; Olaniyi Akinkunmi	Poo Bear; Sons of Sonix	2:50
15.	"That's What Love Is"	Bieber; J. Boyd; Sirota; Courtney Sills	Poo Bear; Sirota	2:45
16.	"At Least for Now"	Bieber; J. Boyd; Harvey; Joshua Williams	Poo Bear; Harv; Williams	2:29
Total length:				44:27

Notes

- ^[a] signifies an additional producer
- Digital reissue of the album includes the Summer Walker Remix of "Yummy" with Summer Walker as a bonus track.
- Japan deluxe edition includes a bonus DVD which features the music, and lyric video of "Yummy".

Sample credits

- "Take It Out on Me" contains samples from "Too Deep", written by Majid Al Maskati, Maneesh Bidaye, Benjamin Bush, Daniel Daley, Stephen Garrett, Anthony Jefferies, and Timothy Mosley, as performed by dvsn.

== Personnel ==
=== Performers and vocals ===
- Justin Bieber – vocals
- Sasha Sirota – guitar (tracks 1, 15)
- Jason 'Poo Bear' Boyd – background vocals (tracks 2–4, 6)
- Marco 'Tainy' Masís – drums, keyboards, bass (track 2)
- Quavo – vocals (track 4)
- Post Malone – vocals (track 7)
- Clever – vocals (track 7)
- Bernard Harvey – keyboards (tracks 7, 16), bass (track 16)
- Lil Dicky – vocals (track 8)
- Daniel Hackett – keyboards (track 9)
- Travis Scott – vocals (track 10)
- Kehlani – vocals (track 11)
- Jun Ha Kim – bass, keyboards, guitar (track 11)
- Phil Beaudreau – drum programming, bass, keyboards, background vocals (track 12)
- Tom Strahle – guitar (track 12)
- Nasri Atweh – guitar (track 13)
- Moses Samuels – keyboards (track 14)
- Summer Walker – vocals (track 17)

=== Technical ===
- Justin Bieber – executive production
- Scooter Braun – executive production
- Jason 'Poo Bear' Boyd – co-executive production, vocal production (track 11)
- Josh Gudwin – co-executive production, vocal production
- Colin Leonard – mastering
- Josh Gudwin – engineering, mixing
- Chris 'Tek' O'Ryan – engineering
- Chenao Wang – assistant engineer (tracks 1–3, 5, 7, 12, 13, 15, 17)
- Kory Welty – additional engineering (track 2)
- Elijah Marrett-Hitch – mixing assistant (tracks 5, 17)
- Louis Bell – Post Malone vocal production (track 7)
- David Burd – Lil Dicky vocals recording (track 8)
- Mark Parfitt – Kehlani vocals recording (track 11)
- Phil Beaudreau – engineering (track 12)
- Summer Walker – vocals recording (track 17)
- Kendall Roark Bailey – vocals recording, mixing (track 17)

=== Design ===
- Jessica Severn – design and packaging
- Chris Shelley – design and packaging
- Buff Monster – lettering
- Joe Termini – photography
- Jennifer Beal – package production
- Andy Proctor – package production

== Charts ==
=== Weekly charts ===
Weekly chart performance for Changes
Chart (2020)	Peak position
Argentine Albums (CAPIF)	4
Australian Albums (ARIA)	2
Austrian Albums (Ö3 Austria)	2
Belgian Albums (Ultratop Flanders)	3
Belgian Albums (Ultratop Wallonia)	5
Canadian Albums (Billboard)	1
Croatian International Albums (HDU)	9
Czech Albums (ČNS IFPI)	1
Danish Albums (Hitlisten)	3
Dutch Albums (Album Top 100)	1
Estonian Albums (Eesti Tipp-40)	1
Finnish Albums (Suomen virallinen lista)	5
French Albums (SNEP)	9
German Albums (Offizielle Top 100)	4
Greek Albums (IFPI)	10
Hungarian Albums (MAHASZ)	24
Icelandic Albums (Tónlistinn)	2
Irish Albums (Official Charts)	2
Italian Albums (FIMI)	7
Japan Hot Albums (Billboard Japan)	10
Japanese Albums (Oricon)	16
Lithuanian Albums (AGATA)	3
Mexican Albums (AMPROFON)	2
New Zealand Albums (RMNZ)	2
Norwegian Albums (VG-lista)	2
Polish Albums (ZPAV)	7
Portuguese Albums (AFP)	2
Scottish Albums (Official Charts)	5
Slovak Albums (ČNS IFPI)	2
South Korean Albums (Gaon)	81
Spanish Albums (Promusicae)	2
Swedish Albums (Sverigetopplistan)	1
Swiss Albums (Schweizer Hitparade)	1
UK Albums (Official Charts)	1
US Billboard 200	1
US Top R&B/Hip-Hop Albums (Billboard)	1

=== Year-end charts ===
2020 year-end chart performance for Changes
Chart (2020)	Position
Australian Albums (ARIA)	33
Belgian Albums (Ultratop Flanders)	41
Belgian Albums (Ultratop Wallonia)	126
Canadian Albums (Billboard)	11
Danish Albums (Hitlisten)	16
Dutch Albums (Album Top 100)	24
French Albums (SNEP)	134
Icelandic Albums (Tónlistinn)	60
Italian Albums (FIMI)	100
New Zealand Albums (RMNZ)	30
Portuguese Albums (AFP)	89
Spanish Albums (PROMUSICAE)	68
Swedish Albums (Sverigetopplistan)	42
Swiss Albums (Schweizer Hitparade)	93
UK Albums (OCC)	87
US Billboard 200	26
US Top R&B/Hip-Hop Albums (Billboard)	21

== Certifications ==
Certifications for Changes
Region	Certification	Certified units/sales
Canada (Music Canada)	Gold	40,000^{‡}
Denmark (IFPI Danmark)	Platinum	20,000^{‡}
France (SNEP)	Gold	50,000^{‡}
Italy (FIMI)	Gold	25,000^{‡}
New Zealand (RMNZ)	2× Platinum	30,000^{‡}
Norway (IFPI Norway)	Gold	10,000^{‡}
Poland (ZPAV)	Gold	10,000^{‡}
Singapore (RIAS)	Platinum	10,000^{*}
United Kingdom (BPI)	Gold	100,000^{‡}
United States (RIAA)	Platinum	1,000,000^{‡}
Summaries
Worldwide	—	1,200,000
^{*} Sales figures based on certification alone.^{‡} Sales+streaming figures based on certification alone.

== Release history ==
Release formats for Changes
Country	Date	Format	Label	Ref.
Various	February 14, 2020	CD; digital download; streaming	Def Jam	
Various	March 13, 2020	Cassette; vinyl	Def Jam	

== See also ==
- List of number-one albums of 2020 (Canada)
- List of Billboard 200 number-one albums of 2020
- List of UK Albums Chart number ones of the 2020s
- List of number-one albums of 2020 (Sweden)
