= Yummy Yummy =

Yummy Yummy may refer to:

- Yummy Yummy (TV series), a Singapore and Hong Kong drama series
- Yummy Yummy (album), a children's album and video by The Wiggles
