= Yummy (Justin Bieber song) =

2020 single by Justin Bieber

Single by Justin Bieber

from the album Changes
- Released: January 3, 2020
- Recorded: 2019
- Studio: Henson (Hollywood, California)
- Genre: Pop; R&B
- Length: 3:30
- Label: Def Jam
- Songwriters: Justin Bieber; Jason Boyd; Sasha Sirota; Daniel Hackett; Ashley Boyd
- Producers: Poo Bear; Sirota; Kid Culture

Justin Bieber singles chronology
"10,000 Hours" (2019)	"Yummy" (2020)	"Intentions" (2020)

Music video
- "Yummy" on YouTube

"Yummy" is a song by Canadian singer Justin Bieber. It was released through Def Jam Recordings, as the lead single from his fifth studio album, Changes, on January 3, 2020. The song was Bieber's first solo single to be released in almost four years, following "Company" (2016), from his fourth studio album, Purpose (2015). Bieber joined the video-sharing social networking service TikTok on the day of the song's release.

"Yummy" received mixed reviews from music critics, some of whom complimented Bieber's vocal performance, while others criticized the song's production, songwriting, and delivery. Bieber's promotional strategy for the song was also criticized. "Yummy" debuted at number two on the US Billboard Hot 100, while reaching the top five in Australia, Canada, the United Kingdom and various other countries, and hitting number one in New Zealand. The song's official music video was released on January 4, 2020.

== Background and promotion ==
The song was first teased by Bieber on October 27, 2019, when he took to Instagram to tease the title of the song by drawing it on a piece of paper. The song's genre, which he dubbed “R&BIEBER”, was also teased on the following day with another post uploaded onto his Instagram account.

On December 23, 2019, Bieber teased the release by posting a picture of himself in front of a piano accompanied by two posts with the caption "tomorrow". The following day, he announced the single via a trailer he uploaded to YouTube that shows him walking through an abandoned gas station. The trailer also served as an announcement for his upcoming North American tour starting May 14, 2020, as well as a documentary covering "all different stories". About the upcoming music, Bieber stated that "I believe that I am right where I’m supposed to be and God has me right where he wants me", and that he feels like "this is different than the previous albums just because of where I'm at in my life".

On the release day of "Yummy", Bieber joined the video-sharing social networking service TikTok and posted a video of himself lip-syncing to the song, and encouraged his fans to do so, as well. Four days later, Bieber released autographed limited editions of "Yummy", including a cassette, a seven-inch picture disc, six unique CDs and five unique seven-inch vinyl discs, available for only 24 hours. Bieber released several additional music videos for the song, titled: "Animated Version", "x drew house, Animated Version", "Beliebers React", "Fan Lip Sync" and "Food Fight", and "TikTok Compilation Video" and launched an official "Yummy" online game.

== Composition ==
"Yummy" is a pop and R&B song that moves along on pop-trap beats. The song is written in D minor, contains a "crisp bass line and plinking keyboards". Bieber rap-sings the pre-chorus, while he hits his "signature falsetto" in the bridge. Bryan Rolli of Forbes magazine called the chorus "seductive", albeit "meaningless". The song is considered an ode to Bieber's wife, Hailey Bieber.

== Critical reception ==
"Yummy" received mixed reviews from music critics.

Rolling Stone listed it among the worst songs of 2020, saying it was a "stupid song" with "weak vocals". Staff from The Urban Influencer said that the track "can almost pass for a rejected Chris Brown song demo". Rania Aniftos of Billboard magazine said "Yummy" brings back "the flirtatious Bieber we've missed and been waiting for", describing the chorus as "catchy".

Bryan Rolli, writing for Forbes, said that Bieber "sings his heart out" on the song and noted although "the lyrics may not invite scholarly analysis ... Bieber sure does sound good singing them". Rolli concluded calling the song a "win, an inevitable chart smash" and opined that it is "sure to sound even better when 50,000 fans scream it every night on his upcoming tour". In a later review, Rolli called the song "mediocre" which "lacks the components of a smash hit."

Mikael Wood of Los Angeles Times described the song as "a lithe little R&B number that faintly recalls Ginuwine's mid-'90s classic 'Pony' and basically three-and-a-half minutes of PG-13 sex talk seemingly directed at Hailey Baldwin". He stated that "though it's very cute, 'Yummy' feels awfully lightweight for a single that has as much hanging on it as this one does" and added that the song "loses much of its flavor after only a few spins". Brad Callas of Complex magazine listed "Yummy" amongst the best new music of the week and said Bieber's "pivot back to R&B is refreshing for those who were fans of his slept-on 2013 project, Journals". Callas further remarked that the "silky vocals" is at times reminiscent of Bieber's 2016 collaboration with Post Malone, "Deja Vu".

NME's Sam Moore complimented the song's R&B production, but dismissed the lyrics, which he termed as "failed expectations". He opined that the song's producers opted for "minimalism with their choice of instrumentation, melding airy keys with pop-trap beats with an evident view of creating something as universal as the likes of 'Hotline Bling' and Childish Gambino's 'Feels Like Summer'". Moore further wrote that Bieber's layered vocals and harmonies are "able to glide along rather effortlessly—it's just a shame he doesn't have more to say with them" and that Bieber's embrace of R&B "isn't a complete turn-off".

Pitchfork's Eric Torres criticized the song for being "shamelessly engineered for the truncated attention span of TikTok" and "a bloodless shell of an R&B song crippled by asinine lyrics and a tired, syncopated backdrop". He further wrote that the song "plateaus as soon as it starts, never inching past the toddler-like repetition of 'yummy-yum' in its chorus".

The Guardian's Alexis Petridis wrote that "Yummy" is "eager to go viral" on TikTok, comparing it to viral songs on the lip-syncing app such as Arizona Zervas's "Roxanne", Ashnikko's "Stupid" and Regard's "Ride It", and that "a generation grown on highly sophisticated, multilayered internet culture can detect bullshit a mile off: this is so nakedly eager to go viral that it almost certainly won't." Petridis pointed out the "shameless plug for his streetwear brand Drew House", "the cringeworthy use of trap ebonics", "use of baby talk to vaguely gesture at a world of sexual pleasure" and the "chorus seems designed purely for Gen Z-ers in yoga pants to spoon frozen acai into their mouths while miming along to the word 'yummy'". He concluded by stating Bieber "doesn't need the TikTok virality, but craves its pop-cultural relevance – and that desperation chafes awkwardly against the spiritually grounded marital bliss of his current image".

Insider labelled "Yummy" "a bad song that just kept getting worse", and included it on a list of the worst songs of 2020. The song's Florida Georgia Line remix was similarly labelled of the worst songs of 2020 in a list published by Variety.

== Music video ==
The music video for "Yummy" was directed by Bardia Zeinali and premiered on January 4, 2020, on Bieber's YouTube channel. The video portrays Bieber with pink hair at a dinner party in a fancy restaurant, eating various colorful food items with guests before starting a dance party. The video garnered 8.4 million views in its first 24 hours, becoming his second biggest 24-hour debut on the platform out of his five lead singles.

Behind the scenes footage of shooting the music video was featured in the episode titled "Album on the Way" of the docu-series Justin Bieber: Seasons.

== Commercial performance ==
In the United States, "Yummy" debuted at number two on the Billboard Hot 100 chart, blocked from the top spot by Roddy Ricch's "The Box", becoming Bieber's second consecutive single as a lead artist to debut at the second spot, following his Ed Sheeran collaboration, "I Don't Care", which was blocked from the top position by "Old Town Road" by Lil Nas X featuring Billy Ray Cyrus.

It became Bieber's seventeenth top-ten hit in the US. The song also debuted atop the Billboard Digital Songs, with 71,000 downloads sold—the highest opening song sales week since the 79,000 total of Taylor Swift's "You Need to Calm Down" (2019). It became Bieber's eleventh leader on the Digital Songs chart, tying him with Katy Perry as the artists with the third-most chart-toppers on the said chart, behind Swift (18) and Rihanna (14); surpassing Drake and Eminem, Bieber further became the male artist with the most Digital Songs chart-toppers.

"Yummy" also peaked atop the Hot R&B Songs chart giving Bieber his second topper and first as a lead artist on the said chart. "Yummy" proceeded to fall to number ten the following week.

On the UK Singles Chart, the track debuted at number five, becoming his first lead single to not debut in the top 3 of the chart since "One Time" the lead single from his debut EP, My World. "Yummy" also debuted in the top 10 in Ireland, where it landed at number 8, as well as number 16 in Scotland. It also debuted in the top 20 of other European countries, going number 7 in the Netherlands, number 10 in Italy and number 15 in Germany.

In Oceania, the song debuted at number 8 in Australia, peaking at number 4. In New Zealand, it topped the singles chart in its second week.

== Promotion controversy ==
Bieber received criticism for his excessive promotion of "Yummy" during the song's release week, that included release of autographed CD variants, seven different videos for the song, online fan interactions that involved Bieber asking fans to buy the song and Bieber's manager Scooter Braun encouraging fans to mass-purchase the song. Bieber also posted a set of fan-made images to Instagram, that detailed instructions to fans about using VPN while streaming "Yummy", in order to inflate US Spotify streams which contribute to the Billboard Hot 100 chart. The post also asked fans to create playlists of the song on repeat and play it overnight on low volume, and to buy the song multiple times through Apple Music and on Bieber's online store; thus, Bieber received further criticism for his "desperate" attempts to "manipulate" music streaming platforms. Social media users labelled it as "transparent ploys" by Bieber's side to help "Yummy" debut at number-one on the Hot 100, by preventing "The Box" by Roddy Ricch from hitting the top spot. The Instagram post was deleted later. However, "Yummy" debuted only at number two on the Billboard Hot 100 chart, blocked from the number-one spot as "The Box" rose to the top spot. Bieber congratulated Ricch on obtaining his first Hot 100 chart-topper.

== Conspiracy theories ==
People on TikTok and QAnon conspiracy theorists online have linked "Yummy" to Pizzagate, the conspiracy theory which alleges a worldwide human trafficking and child sex-abuse ring, and led to its resurgence online in 2020. The conspiracy first gained traction when Venezuelan-Argentine YouTuber, Dross Rotzank, made a video about the "Yummy" music video and its references to Pizzagate. Rotzank's video gained 3 million views in two days and led "Pizzagate" to become a trending topic on the Spanish-language Twitter. Bieber had initially marketed the song by posting photos of babies and toddlers and captioning them with "Yummy" on his Instagram page. The "Yummy" music video was alleged to be filled with symbolism linked to pedophilia and child trafficking. In June 2020, conspiracy theorists believe that Bieber gave a coded signal admitting as such in an Instagram Live video, where he touched his beanie after being asked to do so in the chat if he was a victim of Pizzagate (however, there is no indication that Bieber saw this comment).

== Awards and nominations ==
Year	Organization	Award	Result	Ref.
2021	Grammy Awards	Best Pop Solo Performance	Nominated	
2021	Nickelodeon Kids' Choice Awards	Best Song	Nominated	
2021	iHeartRadio Music Awards	Best Music Video	Nominated	
2021	Myx Music Awards	Favorite International Video	Nominated	

== Credits and personnel ==
Credits adapted from Tidal.

- Justin Bieber – vocals, songwriting
- Poo Bear – production, songwriting
- Sasha Sirota – production, songwriting
- Kid Culture – production
- Ashley Boyd – songwriting
- Daniel Hackett – songwriting
- Elijah Marrett-Hitch – assistant mixing
- Chenao Wang – assistant recording engineering
- Chris "TEK" O'Ryan – engineering
- Josh Gudwin – engineering, mixing, vocal production
- Colin Leonard – master engineering

== Charts ==
=== Weekly charts ===
Chart (2020)	Peak position
Argentina Hot 100 (Billboard)	23
Australia (ARIA)	4
Austria (Ö3 Austria Top 40)	5
Belgium (Ultratop 50 Flanders)	21
Belgium (Ultratop 50 Wallonia)	14
Bolivia (Monitor Latino)	6
Brazil (Top 100 Brasil)	45
Canada Hot 100 (Billboard)	3
Canada CHR/Top 40 (Billboard)	13
Canada Hot AC (Billboard)	23
Colombia (National-Report)	49
Costa Rica (Monitor Latino)	5
Croatia International Airplay (HRT)	15
Czech Republic Airplay (ČNS IFPI)	46
Czech Republic Singles Digital (ČNS IFPI)	3
Denmark (Tracklisten)	2
Dominican Republic (SODINPRO)	25
Ecuador (National-Report)	8
El Salvador (Monitor Latino)	3
Estonia (Eesti Tipp-40)	13
Finland (Suomen virallinen lista)	11
France (SNEP)	21
Germany (GfK)	15
Greece (IFPI)	5
Honduras (Monitor Latino)	12
Hungary (Rádiós Top 40)	14
Hungary (Single Top 40)	2
Hungary (Stream Top 40)	8
Iceland (Tónlistinn)	11
Ireland (IRMA)	8
Israel International Airplay (Media Forest)	8
Italy (FIMI)	10
Japan (Japan Hot 100)	18
Lebanon (OLT20)	12
Malaysia (RIM)	2
Mexico (Billboard Mexican Airplay)	7
Netherlands (Dutch Top 40)	18
Netherlands (Single Top 100)	7
New Zealand (Recorded Music NZ)	1
Nicaragua (Monitor Latino)	3
Norway (VG-lista)	3
Panama (Monitor Latino)	5
Portugal (AFP)	9
Romania (Airplay 100)	6
Scottish Singles Sales (Official Charts)	16
Singapore (RIAS)	2
Slovakia Singles Digital (ČNS IFPI)	12
Slovenia (SloTop50)	14
South Korea (Gaon)	92
Spain (Promusicae)	23
Sweden (Sverigetopplistan)	6
Switzerland (Schweizer Hitparade)	3
UK Singles (Official Charts)	5
US Billboard Hot 100	2
US Adult Contemporary (Billboard)	30
US Adult Pop Airplay (Billboard)	15
US Dance Airplay (Billboard)	18
US Hot R&B/Hip-Hop Songs (Billboard)	2
US Pop Airplay (Billboard)	11
US Rhythmic Airplay (Billboard)	5
US Rolling Stone Top 100	2

=== Monthly charts ===
Chart (2020)	Peak position
Brazil Streaming (Pro-Música Brasil)	36

=== Year-end charts ===
Chart (2020)	Position
Argentina Airplay (Monitor Latino)	66
Australia (ARIA)	59
Belgium (Ultratop Wallonia)	85
Brazil Airplay (Crowley)	92
Canada (Canadian Hot 100)	36
Denmark (Tracklisten)	75
France (SNEP)	163
Hungary (Single Top 40)	62
Hungary (Stream Top 40)	83
New Zealand (Recorded Music NZ)	32
Nigeria TurnTable End of the Year (TurnTable)	49
Portugal (AFP)	59
Romania (Airplay 100)	58
Switzerland (Schweizer Hitparade)	76
UK Singles (OCC)	83
US Billboard Hot 100	58
US Hot R&B/Hip-Hop Songs (Billboard)	28

== Certifications ==
Certifications for "Yummy"
Region	Certification	Certified units/sales
Australia (ARIA)	4× Platinum	280,000^{‡}
Brazil (Pro-Música Brasil)	2× Diamond	320,000^{‡}
Canada (Music Canada)	2× Platinum	160,000^{‡}
Denmark (IFPI Danmark)	Platinum	90,000^{‡}
France (SNEP)	Platinum	200,000^{‡}
Italy (FIMI)	Gold	35,000^{‡}
Mexico (AMPROFON)	Gold	30,000^{‡}
New Zealand (RMNZ)	2× Platinum	60,000^{‡}
Norway (IFPI Norway)	Gold	30,000^{‡}
Poland (ZPAV)	Platinum	50,000^{‡}
Portugal (AFP)	Platinum	10,000^{‡}
Spain (Promusicae)	Gold	20,000^{‡}
United Kingdom (BPI)	Platinum	600,000^{‡}
United States (RIAA)	3× Platinum	3,000,000^{‡}
Streaming
Japan (RIAJ)	Gold	50,000,000^{†}
^{‡} Sales+streaming figures based on certification alone.^{†} Streaming-only figures based on certification alone.

== Release history ==
Country	Date	Format	Version	Label	Ref.
Various	January 3, 2020	Digital download; streaming	Original	Def Jam	
United Kingdom	January 3, 2020	Contemporary hit radio	Original	Def Jam	
United States	January 7, 2020	Contemporary hit radio	Original	Def Jam	
United States	January 7, 2020	Rhythmic contemporary radio	Original	Def Jam	
United States	January 7, 2020	Urban adult contemporary radio	Original	Def Jam	
Various	February 3, 2020	Digital download; streaming	Summer Walker Remix	Def Jam	
Various	February 19, 2020	Digital download; streaming	Florida Georgia Line	Def Jam	

== Remixes ==
A remix of "Yummy" with American singer Summer Walker was released a month after the song on February 3, 2020. A country remix of the song featuring American country duo Florida Georgia Line was released on February 19, 2020, five days after Bieber's album Changes released.

== See also ==
- Justin Bieber: Seasons (2020)
- List of Billboard Hot 100 top-ten singles in 2020
- List of number-one digital songs of 2020 (U.S.)
- List of number-one singles from the 2020s (New Zealand)
