= Justin Bieber: Seasons =

2020 docu-series starring Justin Bieber

- Genre: Documentary
- Directed by: Michael D. Ratner
- Starring: Justin Bieber; Hailey Bieber; Scooter Braun; Allison Kaye; Ryan Good
- Original language: English
- No. of episodes: 10

Production
- Executive producers: Justin Bieber; Scooter Braun; Allison Kaye; Scott Manson; Michael D. Ratner; Scott Ratner; Kfir Goldberg
- Producer: Marc Ambrose
- Cinematography: Michael Dwyer
- Editor: Paul Little
- Running time: 8–15 minutes
- Production companies: Bieber Time Films; SB Films; OBB Pictures

Original release
- Network: YouTube Premium
- Release: January 27 – February 25, 2020

Justin Bieber: Seasons is a 2020 American YouTube docu-series about Canadian singer Justin Bieber. It details his return to music and his personal struggles, including health issues such as battling Lyme disease, and overcoming mental stress and drug addiction. It is directed and executive produced by OBB Pictures' Michael D. Ratner. The documentary is produced by Bieber Time Films, SB Films, and OBB Pictures, with Bieber serving as an executive producer.

The docu-series broke the all-time record for the most-viewed premiere in its first week of all YouTube Originals to date where its premiere episode titled "Leaving the Spotlight" amassed 32.65 million views within its first week of release surpassing the previous record held by the season 2 premiere of Liza on Demand which had amassed 25.4 million views within its first week of release.

== Background ==
On December 24, 2019, Bieber announced the docu-series. The series is described as an "intimate, in-depth look on his life after releasing his album Purpose". The series includes his wedding ceremony and marriage to Hailey Bieber and also the music and the creation of his fifth studio album Changes.

== Promotion ==
The trailer of the documentary series was released on December 31, 2019. A sneak peek was premiered at Dick Clark's New Year's Rockin' Eve special, with Bieber saying "as humans, we go through so many ups and downs. So many good seasons, bad seasons. Sometimes, we want to give up."

== Release ==
The first four episodes of the series were released on January 27, 2020 on YouTube Premium, with later episodes being released irregularly. For users without a YouTube Premium subscription, two episodes were released per week, starting with the first episode on January 27, 2020.

== Episodes ==
No.	Title	Directed by	Original release date
1	"Leaving the Spotlight"	Michael D. Ratner	January 27, 2020
A look back at Justin's life after cancelling the last leg of his Purpose Tour.
2	"Bieber Is Back"	Michael D. Ratner	January 27, 2020
Justin heads into the studio to record the first single off the new album.
3	"Making Magic"	Michael D. Ratner	January 27, 2020
Justin shines light on his closest collaborators in the studio – Josh & Poo Bear.
4	"Justin & Hailey"	Michael D. Ratner	January 27, 2020
Justin and his spouse Hailey Bieber open up about how they met, why they think it's meant to be, and what's it's like to embark on the most important season of their life: marriage.
5	"The Dark Season (featuring Dr. Daniel Amen, Dr. Erica Lehman and Dr. Buzz Mingin)"	Michael D. Ratner	February 3, 2020
Justin talks in-depth for the first time publicly about his health. He shares details on his history with drugs: when and why he started using them, and the dark moments that made him realize it was time to quit for good. He also reveals how he deals with his physical and mental health after being diagnosed with Lyme disease. Most importantly, he gets candid about the daily battles he's still fighting now, how he got help and took control of his life, and how, if you're struggling with something, you can, too.
6	"Only Up from Here"	Michael D. Ratner	February 5, 2020
Justin and his team reflect on the effects of the immense pressure he's been under since coming into the spotlight as a teenager. With the album release closing in, and in desperate need of a break, Justin and Hailey take a getaway to Utah's Amangiri resort to hit pause and reset.
7	"Planning the Wedding a Year Later"	Michael D. Ratner	February 10, 2020
A dive into all of Justin's lesser-known hobbies outside music, including his love of style and the story behind his own fashion label Drew House. Plus, Justin and Hailey head to Bluffton, South Carolina to put the finishing touches on their upcoming wedding.
8	"The Wedding: Officially Mr. & Mrs. Bieber"	Michael D. Ratner	February 12, 2020
A look inside Hailey and Justin's intimate wedding ceremony in South Carolina (complete with a few surprise guests). As the two finally tie the knot, Justin and those closest to him reflect on just how far he's come—from teenage sensation to world-famous popstar to a mature, loving husband—and what he's had to do to get there.
9	"Album on the Way (featuring Dr. Daniel Amen)"	Michael D. Ratner	February 17, 2020
Justin faces one of his biggest tests to date: getting back into performance mode in order to shoot a music video. With the cameras on and everyone counting on him, Justin must rely on the tools that have helped him grow and change in recent years, attempting to overcome the anxiety that has derailed him in the past.
10	"The Finale (featuring Billie Eilish, Big Sean, DJ Khaled, Usher and Quavo)"	Michael D. Ratner	February 25, 2020
On the verge of the album release and stadium tour, Justin, his friends and family, and a hall of fame cast of artists that he's collaborated with reflect on the incredible journey he has taken and how far he's come. We finally catch up in real-time to the long-anticipated release of "Changes".

== Cast ==
- Justin Bieber
- Hailey Bieber
- Scooter Braun
- Allison Kaye
- Ryan Good
- Josh Gudwin
- Poo Bear
- Dr. Daniel Amen
- Dr. Erica Lehman
- Dr. Buzz Mingin
- Billie Eilish
- DJ Khaled
- Usher
- Big Sean
- Quavo
- Ariana Grande
- Jaden Smith
- Kendall Jenner
- Kylie Jenner
- Kris Jenner
- Auston Matthews
- Mitch Marner
- Tyson Barrie
