= Aerospace Journalist of the Year Awards =

This article is about the international Aerospace Journalist of the Year Awards (AJOYA), issued from 1996 to 2009–2010 by the World Leadership Forum, Ltd, of London, England, U.K., in conjunction with the Farnborough Air Show (England) and the Paris Air Show (France).

AJOYA should not be confused with the Australia's "Aviation Journalist of the Year" Awards, issued by that country's National Aviation Press Club (at least during 2010, in Sydney, Australia). Those awards were restricted to writers from Australia and New Zealand.

== Overview ==
The international Aerospace Journalist of the Year Awards (AJOYA) were awards for writers and broadcasters working in the aerospace and aviation field, including specialists and those working for non-specialist titles. The awards dinner took place in mid-July (timed to coincide with the Farnborough Air Show and the Paris Air Show), and brought together aviation media and industry representatives.

The awards were organised between 1996 and 2010 by Malcolm Turner and his company (the World Leadership Forum, Ltd, of the UK) under the auspices of the Royal Aeronautical Society of the U.K. and the Aero Club of France (Aéro-Club de France).

The awards, given annually, were typically organized in a hierarchy:

- 1.) All entries in each category of each award (typically varying from seven to dozens of contestants, depending on the volume of entries—commonly in the hundreds).

...which judges narrowed down to...

- 2.) "Shortlist" finalists in each category (usually about the top 5 candidates) (Shortlists were published on the respective Awards program websites for the few months leading up to the Awards Banquet/Ceremony.)

...from which, based on judges' scores, were selected...

- 3.) ""Best in Category" winners" in each topical category, announced at the Awards Banquet/Ceremony

...from which were selected, based on judges' scores...

- 4.) The OVERALL "Aerospace Journalist of the Year," also announced at the Awards Banquet/Ceremony

...and an additional award...

- 5.) The "DECADE OF EXCELLENCE" Award was also awarded each year (based on judges' scores), for the most outstanding aerospace journalist of the previous ten years.

== Trophies ==
The AJOYA awards were originally trophies in the form of a bronze eagle – leading the awards to become known colloquially as 'budgies', and for the competition to become known as the 'Budgie Awards'. The design of the trophy changed several times, becoming a representation of the Aerospace Journalist of the Year logo, and then a simple engraved glass 'spike'.

== History ==
The aerospace industry's writing awards, previously for many years (1960s to mid-/late 1990s), had been awarded annually by the U.S.-based Aviation & Space Writers' Association, at a grand banquet gathering aviation industry leaders and luminaries. That organization and its awards program dissolved, leaving a vacuum in the aviation media world.

Starting in the late 1990s, until 2009–2010, that void was filled by a British enterprise—the World Leadership Forum, Ltd. – in collaboration with the world's two oldest aviation organizations: the Aero Club of France (Aéro-Club de France), and the Royal Aeronautical Society (of the United Kingdom).

Awards were issued in several "Category" topic areas (see lists below).

Contest entries (copies of published articles or broadcasts) were received from publications and authors, then copied and redistributed to judges in each category, who then narrowed the submissions down to a few finalists (the prestigious "Shortlist") in each category, which was then published on the organization website during the months leading up to the banquet.

The "Shortlist" candidates were invited to the Awards Banquet, where they would then discover who, among them, would be awarded the "Aerospace Journalist of the Year Award" in that respective category. Then from the category winners, a tally of judges' scores determined the one overall "Aerospace Journalist of the Year," and one Honoree for a "Decade of Excellence" Award.

The awards were first presented in London in 1996, and throughout the years, the presentation ceremonies have alternated between Paris and London—roughly coinciding with the world's two main airshows: the Paris Air Show and Farnborough Air Show (England), held on alternate years.

In London, the AJOYA ceremonies have taken place at the Ballroom of the Park Lane Hotel, Piccadilly, and at the Royal Courts of Justice, and they directly preceded the biennial Farnborough Airshow.

The organization depended upon aerospace industry companies to sponsor the awards, and reciprocated their generosity by offering them seating with the AJOYA finalists at the awards banquet—a public-relations opportunity for aerospace industry leaders and P.R. execs to charm their industry's leading writers and opinion-shapers.

However, remotely located from most of the world's aviation media (in London or Paris, far removed from the Americas, Africa and Asia), many aerospace writers who made the awards-finalist "Shortlists" (and were thus invited to the banquet), were unable to attend—undermining the value of the banquet, and sponsorships, to AJOYA's commercial sponsors.

The awards then began to be limited to only those writers who would make the trip to the banquet, sharply reducing eligibility for the awards.

Initially, relatively few of the world's aerospace journalists competed, and the awards were almost exclusively from the U.S. and Britain, with a few contestants from Western Europe and British Commonwealth nations.

However, as the years went by, many more entered the contests, and additional categories of judging were added, and non-English entries were admitted (and translated into English for the judges), drawing contest entries from throughout the world—Russia and Eastern Europe, China and East Asia, South Asia, Latin America and Africa.

The volume of entries began to overwhelm the limited number of AJOYA judges, creating difficulties.

The global economic "Great Recession" that started in 2007 soon collapsed the aerospace industry, and forced drastic budget-tightening on nearly all aerospace companies. "Extras"—such as support of aviation organizations and programs—were cut out of many companies' budgets.

The awards ended amid rumours that they folded due to a lack of sponsorship.

The World Leadership Forum, Ltd. organization dissolved in 2009, according to the business-info website Duedil.com.

The AJOYA.com website is now off-line and the domain name is for sale.

There were no awards in 2011, and in 2012 a different organiser held a new Aerospace Media Awards dinner at the Royal Aeronautical Society in London.

== Judges ==
Judges were chiefly leading aerospace industry editors & writers, and business/technical leaders & experts—largely chosen from the ranks of former AJOYA winners or "Shortlist" finalists—from around the world.

The judges came from aerospace industry publications such as:

- Aero Revue
- Aviation International News
- Aviation Week & Space Technology
- Business & Commercial Aviation
- Flight International
- Jane's Defence Weekly

To ensure fair judging, judges were recused from voting on their own submissions, and from voting on any other submissions from any publication for whom they wrote, or any "sister" publication (owned by the same, or a related, company).

The final list of AJOYA judges (see below) finished with the note: "The judges have not marked any entry from their own publication/company, or any sister publication/company"

This is the last list of judges, which remained on the AJOYA.com website until 2010:

2009 Judges:

- Charles Alcock, Editorial Director, Aviation International News
- Guy Anderson, Editor, Jane's Defence Industry
- Patricia Andrighetto, Editor, Aero Revue
- James Asker, Managing Editor, Aviation Week & Space Technology
- Tom Ballantyne, Chief Correspondent, Orient Aviation
- Douglas Barrie, London Bureau Chief, Aviation Week & Space Technology
- Elaine Camhi, Editor-in-Chief, Aerospace America
- James Careless, Freelance journalist, TJT Design & Communication
- Bill Carey, Editor in Chief, Avionics Magazine
- Rob Coppinger, Technical Editor, Flight International
- Nick Fadugba, Publisher & Editor, African Aviation
- Bernard Fitzsimons, Freelance Journalist
- William Garvey, Editor-in-Chief, Business & Commercial Aviation magazine
- Ian Goold, Aviation Journalist
- Bruce Hales-Dutton, Freelance Journalist, Editor & Consultant
- Richard Harris, Aviation Writer
- Ed Hazelwood, Editor-In-Chief, Aviation Week & Space Technology
- Hans Heerkens, Aviation Analyst & Assistant Professor, University of Twente
- Johnny Keggler, Editor, Armada International
- Paul Lewis, Director of International Communications, Boeing IDS
- Alexander Mladenov, Consulting Editor, Klub Krile
- Julian Nott, Aviation Consultant
- Don Peterson, President, Universal Analyzers, Inc.
- Elliot Pulham, President & CEO, The Space Foundation
- David Rimmer, Executive Vice President, ExcelAire Service, LLC
- John Sharman, Executive Director, Spectrum Capital London, Limited
- Rod Simpson, Editor, Aviation World
- Michael Simpson, President, International Space University
- Vikramjit Singh Chopra, Editor-in-Chief, Vayu Aerospace Review
- Pierre Sparaco, Freelance journalist (former European Bureau Chief, Aviation Week & Space Technology)
- Lee Ann Tegtmeier, Managing Editor, Overhaul & Maintenance
- Aimee Turner, Senior Editor, Flight International
- Tony Velocci, Editor-in-Chief, Aviation Week & Space Technology
- Brian Walters, Freelance Journalist
- Howard Wheeldon, Senior Strategist, BGC Partners
- Mark Williamson, Space Technology Consultant

== Categories ==
The categories for the awards include:

- Air Show Daily
- Air Show Submission
- Air Transport
- Avionics
- Breaking News
- Business Aircraft
- Business or Financial
- Defence
- General Aviation
- Maintenance
- Propulsion
- Regional Aircraft
- Safety
- Space
- Systems or Technology
- Decade of Excellence

== Winners ==
Winners are grouped below into:

- THE DECADE OF EXCELLENCE winner (one per year)
- THE AEROSPACE JOURNALIST OF THE YEAR (overall) winner (one per year)
- The CATEGORY WINNERS (one in each category, each year)
- (NOTE: The Shortlist finalists in each category are NOT listed below).

THE DECADE OF EXCELLENCE Award

- 1996 Pierre Sparaco of Aviation Week & Space Technology
- 1997 Pierre Condom of Interavia
- 1998 Phillip Klass of Aviation Week & Space Technology
- 1999 Jim Holahan of Aviation International News
- 2000 René Francillon
- 2001 Jeff Cole of the Wall Street Journal (posthumously)
- 2002 Graham Warwick of Flight International
- 2003 John Fricker of Aviation Week Group
- 2004 Craig Covault – Aviation Week & Space Technology
- 2005 Richard Aarons of Business & Commercial Aviation
- 2006 Guy Norris of Flight International
- 2007 William Gunston
- 2008 Perry Flint
- 2009 Not awarded
- 2010 Not awarded

THE AEROSPACE JOURNALIST OF THE YEAR:

- 1996 Eric Biass of Armada International
- 1997 Robert Ropelewski of Aerospace America (posthumous)
- 1998 Philip Whiteman of Pilot (UK magazine)
- 1999 Kathleen Kocks of Global Airspace
- 2000 Andrew Chuter of Flight International
- 2001 Perry Flint of Air Transport World
- 2002 James Ott of Aviation Week & Space Technology
- 2003 James Canan of Aerospace America
- 2004 James Donoghue Air Transport World
- 2005 Kathleen Bangs of Business & Commercial Aviation
- 2006 Michael Dornheim of Aviation Week & Space Technology (posthumously)
- 2007 Stephen Pope
- 2008 David Hughes, Aviation Week & Space Technology
- 2009 Geoffrey Thomas of Air Transport World
- 2010 Murdo Morrison of Flight International

The CATEGORY WINNERS in each category,
for each year were:

BEST AIR SHOW SUBMISSION

- 1996 Eric Biass of Armada
- 1997 James Donoghue of Air Transport World
- 1998 Paul Duffy of Air Transport World
- 1999 Frank Kuznik of Air & Space/Smithsonian
- 2000 Charles Alcock of Aviation International News
- 2001 Alan Peaford of Flight Daily News
- 2002 Paul Richfield of Business & Commercial Aviation
- 2003 Charles Alcock of Aviation International News
- 2004 John Morris & Team for 'Comanche analysis' in Show News
- 2005 Mark Williamson for What's new in the industry – Satellite Evolution Asia
- 2006 Tony Velocci and William Scott for Birds & blues
- 2007 William B. Scott for Contract of trust – Aviation Week & Space Technology
- 2008 Alan Peaford – Best of the Biggest & Fastest – India. SP's Aviation
- 2009 Not known
- 2010 Murdo Morrison – Visions of Arabia – Flight International

BEST AIR SHOW DAILY

- 2005 Flight Daily News
- 2006 Flight Daily News (Paris)
- 2007 Farnborough Air Show Day 2, Flight Daily News
- 2008 Charles Alcock – AIN TV Paris Air Show
- 2009 AIN's MEBA Convention News
- 2010 Not awarded?

BEST AIR TRANSPORT SUBMISSION

- 1996 Jim Thorn of Australian Aviation
- 1997 David Learmount of Flight International
- 1998 Tom Ballantyne of Orient Aviation
- 1999 Hugh Field of Jets Magazine
- 2000 Andrew Chuter of Flight International
- 2001 John Wiley of Business & Commercial Aviation
- 2002 James Ott of Aviation Week & Space Technology
- 2003 Dick McKinney of Business & Commercial Aviation
- 2004 Carol Matlack for 'Mega Plane' in Business Week
- 2005 David Learmount for Great Escape – Flight International
- 2006 Justin Wastnage for Under pressure – Flight International
- 2007 Alexander Derber for Global warning: the climate change impact of aviation – Airline Fleet & Network Management
- 2008 Dino Carrara – Antarctic Flyers – Air International
- 2009 Jon Ostrower – A Flawed Dream – Flight International
- 2010 Max Kingsley-Jones – Judging a Giant – Flight International

BEST AVIONICS SUBMISSION

- 1996 Perry Flint of Air Transport World
- 1997 Kieran Daly of Flight International
- 1998 James Allan of Pilot (UK magazine)
- 1999 Brian Walters of Air International
- 2000 Stephen Pope of Aviation International News
- 2001 Kathleen Kocks of Avionics Magazine
- 2002 David Evans of Avionics Magazine
- 2003 Stephen Pope of Aviation International News
- 2004 Fred George for 'Dassault Falcon Jet's EASy cockpit' in Business & Commercial Aviation
- 2005 Stephen Pope for Emerging cockpit technology – Aviation International News
- 2006 Stephen Pope for The future of head-up display technology – Aviation International
- 2007 Stephen Pope for The promise of synthetic vision: turning ideas into (virtual) reality – Aviation International News
- 2008 David Hughes – Have Radar, Will Travel – Aviation Week & Space Technology
- 2009 Bernard Fitzsimons – Avionics Upgrades & Modernisation – Aircraft Technology Engineering & Maintenance
- 2010 David Esler – 4-D Nav Is Coming – Business & Commercial Aviation

BEST BREAKING NEWS SUBMISSION

- 1999 Craig Covault & Joseph Anselmo of Aviation Week & Space Technology
- 2000 Craig Covault of Aviation Week & Space Technology
- 2001 Pushpindar Singh of VAYU Aerospace Review
- 2002 Roger Mola of Aviation International News
- 2003 Paul Duffy of Air International
- 2004 David Hughes & Michael Dornheim for 'No flight controls' in Aviation Week & Space Technology
- 2005 Joseph Bermudez for North Korea deploys new missiles – Jane's Defence Weekly
- 2006 Michael Dornheim for Skunks working – Aviation Week & Space Technology
- 2007 Max Kingsley-Jones & Guy Norris for Can Boeing exploit A380 delays? – Flight International
- 2008 Adrian Schofield – Unlocking China's Skies – Aviation Week & Space Technology
- 2009 Robert Hewson – Questions Raised over Norway's JSF Costs – Jane's Defence Weekly
- 2010 Robert Hewson – Pakistan using UAVs in 'drone war' – JDW

BEST BUSINESS AIRCRAFT SUBMISSION

- 1996 Karen Walker of Flight International
- 1997 Bill Carey of Avionics Magazine
- 1998 Bernard Chabbert of Pilot (UK magazine)
- 1999 Stephen Pope of Aviation International News
- 2000 Gordon Gilbert of Aviation International News
- 2001 John Grossmann of Air & Space Magazine
- 2002 Fred George and Dave Benoff of Business and Commercial Aviation
- 2003 Fred George of Business & Commercial Aviation
- 2004 Fred George for 'Your first Atlantic crossing' in Business & Commercial Aviation
- 2005 Michael Jerram for Window on the horizon – Air International
- 2006 James Asker for Reach for the sky – Aviation Week & Space Technology
- 2007 Fred George for Flying the Falcon 7X – Business & Commercial Aviation
- 2008 David Huntzinger – On Duty Indefinitely – Business & Commercial Aviation
- 2009 Robert Mark – Defending Your Jet – Business Jet Traveler
- 2010 Joe Anselmo and William Garvey – Critical Condition Image Problem – Aviation Week & Space Technology

BEST BUSINESS OR FINANCIAL SUBMISSION

- 1997 Nick Cook & Bill Sweetman of Jane's Defence Weekly
- 1998 Lois Jones of Airline Business
- 1999 Kathleen Kocks of Global Airspace
- 2000 Gunter Endres of Airline Business
- 2001 Perry Flint of Air Transport World
- 2002 Anthony Velocci of Aviation Week & Space Technology
- 2003 David Esler of Business & Commercial Aviation
- 2004 David Esler for 'The high cost of operating in Europe' in Business & Commercial Aviation
- 2005 Craig Mellow for The rise and fall and rise of Iridium – Air & Space
- 2006 Günter Endres for Northern Raiders – Airline Business
- 2007 Nicola Clark for How hubris and haste snarled Airbus A380 – International Herald Tribune
- 2008 Jennifer Harrington – Business Aviation In China– Aviation International News
- 2009 Geoffrey Thomas – Deregulation's Mixed Legacy – Air Transport World
- 2010 Geoff Thomas – Reinventing Comfort – Air Transport World

BEST DEFENCE SUBMISSION

- 1996 Bernard Gray of the Financial Times
- 1997 Nick Cook of Jane's Defence Weekly
- 1998 William Scott of Aviation Week & Space Technology
- 1999 Maxi Gainza of Pilot (UK magazine)
- 2000 James Canan of Aerospace America
- 2001 Jim Thorn of Australian Aviation
- 2002 Bill Sweetman of International Defence Review
- 2003 James Canan of Aerospace America
- 2004 Andrew Brookes for 'Combat air power – past, present and future' in Air International
- 2005 David Hobbs for Personal opinion: Harriers, V/STOL and all that – Aero Australia
- 2006 Andrew Brookes for British air power, a radical reappraisal – Air International
- 2007 Bill Sweetman for UCAVs offer fast track to stealth, long-range and carrier operations – Jane's International Defence Review
- 2008 Jon Lake – Fighting Today’s Wars With Yesterday's Aircraft – Air International
- 2009 Jon Lake – Secretive Nimrods – Air International
- 2010 Gareth Jennings – Stretched Wings – JDW

BEST ENVIRONMENT SUBMISSION

- 2004 Brian Walters for 'To a green future' in Air International

BEST GENERAL AVIATION SUBMISSION

- 1996 Karen Walker of Flight International
- 1997 Bernard Chabbert of Pilot (UK magazine)
- 1998 Philip Whiteman of Pilot (UK magazine)
- 1999 Stephan Wilkinson of Pilot (UK magazine)
- 2000 Nick Bloom of Pilot (UK magazine)
- 2001 John Persinos of Rotor & Wing Magazine
- 2002 Stephan Wilkinson of Pilot (UK magazine)
- 2003 Barry Schiff of AOPA Pilot
- 2004 James Donoghue for 'A celebration of the centennial of flight' in Air Transport World
- 2005 Bernard Chabbert for Love and a Lockheed – Aerospace America
- 2006 Phil O'Dell for So you want to fly the Spitfire – FLYER (magazine)
- 2007 Brian Lecomber for Classic biplane fly-off – FLYER (magazine)
- 2008 Philip Whiteman – Single Engine Piston into Gatwick and Heathrow – FLYER (magazine)
- 2009 Philip Whiteman – A Lighter Touch – FLYER (magazine)
- 2010 Philip Whiteman – Fedden's Forgotten Flat Six – Today's Pilot

BEST MAINTENANCE SUBMISSION

- 1996 Arthur Reed of Air Transport World
- 1997 Paul Copping of Aircraft Technology Engineering & Maintenance
- 1998 Susan Young of Overhaul & Maintenance
- 1999 Alan Hobbs of Asia Pacific Air Safety
- 2000 Jerome Chandler of Overhaul & Maintenance
- 2001 David Esler of Business & Commercial Aviation
- 2002 Lee Ann Tegtmeier of Overhaul & Maintenance
- 2003 Paul Copping of Aircraft Technology
- 2004 David Evans for 'Air Midwest crash exposes systemic shortcomings' in Air Safety Week
- 2005 Chris Davis for Why and when to hire a full-time maintainer – Business & Commercial Aviation
- 2006 Matt Thurber for The saga of Papa Whiskey – Aviation Maintenance
- 2007 Aaron Karp for Next-generation mechanic – Air Transport World
- 2008 Jerome Chandler – Inspections Now and in the Future – Overhaul & Maintenance
- 2009 Niall O'Keeffe – MRO Providers Shift Their Priorities – Airline Business
- 2010 Justin Cox – Oil for a smooth life – FLYER (magazine)

BEST PROPULSION SUBMISSION

- 1996 Stanley Kandebo of Aviation Week & Space Technology
- 1997 Ray Whitford of Air International
- 1998 David Baker of Air International
- 1999 Bill Gunston of Air International
- 2000 Bill Gunston of Air International
- 2001 Nick Cook of Jane's Defence Weekly
- 2002 Rene Francillon of Air International
- 2003 Robert Searles of Business & Commercial Aviation
- 2004 Guy Norris for 'Pulse power' in Flight International
- 2005 Miles McCallum for The technology chasm – Flyer
- 2006 Bill Sweetman for The short, happy life of the prop-fan – Air & Space
- 2007 James Ott for Synthetics soar – Aviation Week & Space Technology
- 2008 David Esler – Alternative Fuels for Jet Engines – Business & Commercial Aviation
- 2009 Lee Ann Tegtmeier – Cost versus Performance – Overhaul & Maintenance
- 2010 Bill Read – Power Plants – Aerospace International

BEST REGIONAL AIRCRAFT SUBMISSION

- 1996 Carole Shifrin of Aviation Week & Space Technology
- 1997 Perry Bradley of Business & Commercial Aviation
- 1998 Paul Copping of Aircraft Technology Engineering & Maintenance
- 1999 Paul Duffy of Air International
- 2000 Bernie Baldwin of Airlines International
- 2001 Ian Goold of Aviation International News
- 2002 Andrew Doyle, Paul Lewis and Max Kingsley-Jones of Flight International
- 2003 Bernie Baldwin of Regional Airline World
- 2004 Justin Wastnage for 'Delayed reaction' in Flight International
- 2005 Max Kingsley-Jones, Guy Norris, Stephen Trimble & Graham Warwick for Teething troubles – Flight International
- 2006 Sean Silcoff for Brazil takes flight: Embraer pulls off mission impossible – National Post (Canada)
- 2007 Bernie Baldwin for Dollar dealings bring Turkish delight – Regional Airline World
- 2008 Max Kingsley-Jones – E-Jet Verdict – Flight International
- 2009 Scott Hamilton – Suddenly it's Very Crowded Out There – Aviation & The Environment
- 2010 Mary Kirby – Almost Heaven – Flight International

BEST SAFETY SUBMISSION

- 1998 Michael Dornheim of Aviation Week & Space Technology
- 1999 David Evans of Air Safety Week
- 2000 David Evans of Air Safety Week
- 2001 David Carlisle of Business & Commercial Aviation
- 2002 Perry Flint of Air Transport World
- 2003 Gary Stoller of USA Today
- 2004 Robert Mark for 'Upset training gives pilots an in-flight safety net' in Aviation International News
- 2005 Kathleen Bangs for Hearing voices: intuition & accident avoidance – Business & Commercial Aviation
- 2006 David Huntzinger for In the PINC – Business & Commercial Aviation
- 2007 Patrick R. Veillette for Blinded by see-and-avoid – Business & Commercial Aviation
- 2008 John Wiley – Lightning: Ungrounded Fears, and Real Menace – Business & Commercial Aviation
- 2009 Tom LeCompte – The Disorient Express – Air & Space
- 2010 David Carlisle – Wind Shear Accident – Business & Commercial Aviation

BEST SPACE SUBMISSION

- 1997 Robert Ropelewski of Aerospace America (posthumous)
- 1998 Joseph Anselmo of Aviation Week & Space Technology
- 1999 Bill Sweetman of Jane's International Defence Review
- 2000 Michael McCulley of Pilot Magazine
- 2001 Erick Schonfeld of Fortune Magazine
- 2002 Frank Sietzen of Aerospace America
- 2003 Leonard David of Aerospace America
- 2004 Bill Sweetman for 'Burt builds your ride to space' in Popular Science
- 2005 Justin Mullins for Lost in space (part 1 of 3) – NewScientist
- 2006 Leonard David for Europe's touchdown on Titan – Aerospace America
- 2007 Bill Sweetman for Satellite micro-revolution offers the potential for broader vision – Jane's International Defence Review
- 2008 Mark Williamson – Deep Impact – Launch Magazine
- 2009 Craig Covault – Secret Inspection Satellites – SpaceFlight Now
- 2010 Mark Williamson – Up Close and Personal – Physics World

BEST SYSTEMS OR TECHNOLOGY SUBMISSION

- 1996 Perry Bradley of Business & Commercial Aviation
- 1997 Guy Norris of Flight International
- 1998 Bruce Dorminey of the Financial Times
- 1999 Nick Cook of Jane's Defence Weekly
- 2000 Frank Colucci of Vertiflite
- 2001 Robert Rossier of Business & Commercial Aviation
- 2002 Geoffrey Thomas of Air Transport World
- 2003 Geoffrey Thomas of Air Transport World
- 2004 Michael Dornheim for 'Affordable spaceship' in Aviation Week & Space Technology
- 2005 Ray Whitford for Fundamentals of Airline Design (Supersonic Transports II) – Air International
- 2006 David Esler for FADEC's benefits today and tomorrow – Business & Commercial Aviation
- 2007 Thierry Dubois for Upstarts favor electric while establishment sits on fence – Aviation International News
- 2008 Brian Walters – Aviation, An Environment Hazard? – Air International
- 2009 Michael Gubisch – Ready for Departure – Aircraft Technology Engineering & Maintenance
- 2010 Michael Gubisch – Graphics, graphite, and watching paint dry – Aircraft Technology Engineering & Maintenance

== See also ==
- List of aviation awards
