= List of awards and nominations received by Justin Bieber =

Justin Bieber awards and nominations
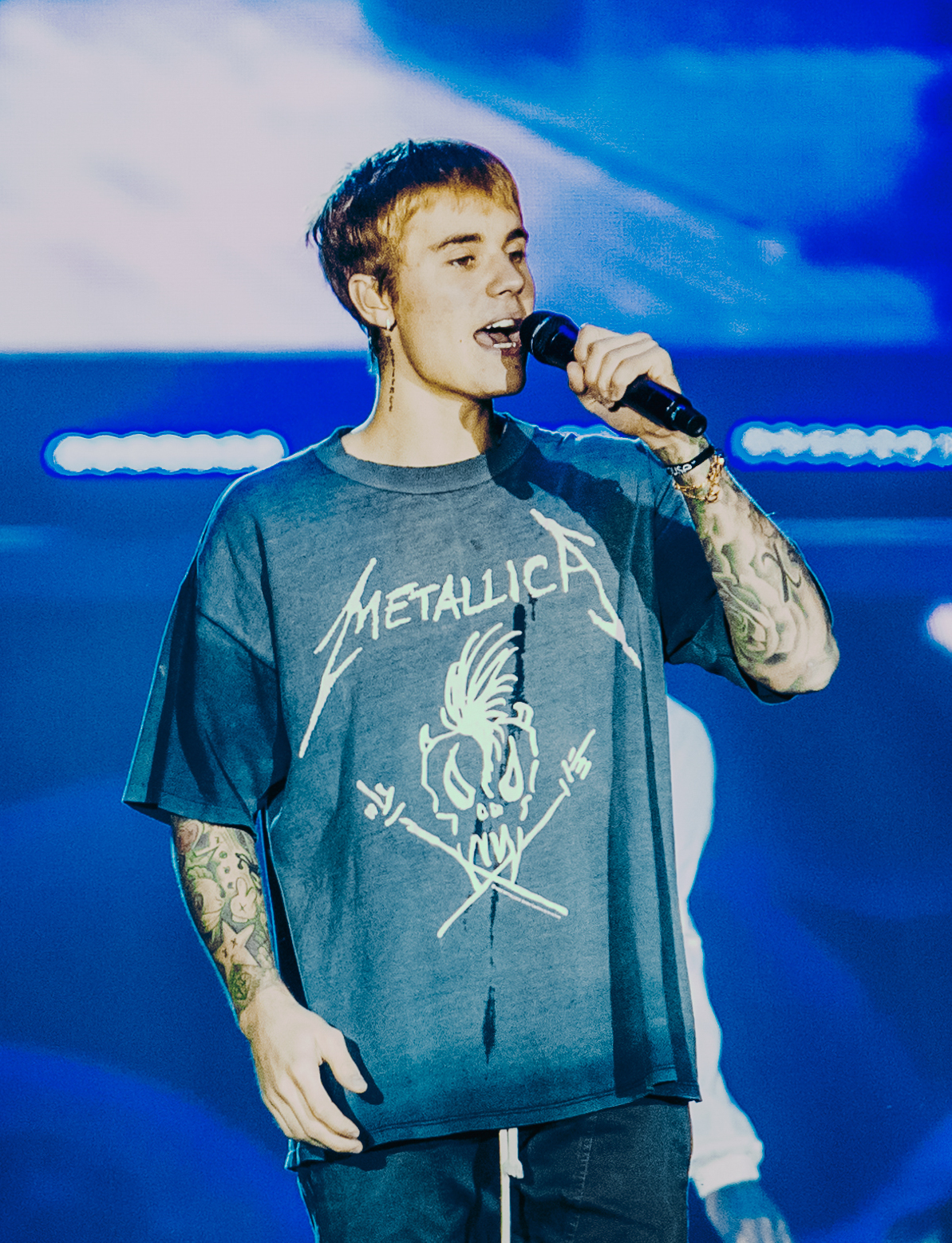
- Bieber at a concert in Poland (2016)
Awards and nominations
Award	Wins	Nominations
Academy of Country Music Awards	0	3
American Music Awards	19	30
ARIA Music Awards	0	3
ASCAP Awards	22	22
Bambi Awards	1	1
Billboard Japan Music Awards	1	1
Billboard Latin Music Awards	9	10
Billboard Music Awards	26	76
Bravo Otto	9	9
Brit Awards	2	4
Circle Chart Music Awards	2	2
Georgia Music Hall of Fame	1	1
Global Awards	1	5
Grammy Awards	2	23
Guinness World Records	35	35
iHeartRadio Much Music Video Awards	12	21
iHeartRadio Music Awards	8	42
Juno Awards	8	32
Latin American Music Awards	2	7
Latin Grammy Awards	1	1
Melon Music Awards	1	3
MTV Europe Music Awards	22	52
MTV Italian Music Awards	9	17
MTV Movie & TV Awards	1	1
MTV Video Music Awards	6	38
Nickelodeon Kids' Choice Awards	9	24
NRJ Music Awards	6	13
People's Choice Awards	3	29
Teen Choice Awards	23	56

Totals (Note: Certain award groups do not simply award one winner. They acknowledge several different recipients, have runners-up, and have third place. Since this is a specific recognition and is different from losing an award, runner-up mentions are considered wins in this award tally. For simplification and to avoid errors, each award in this list has been presumed to have had a prior nomination.)
- Wins: 347
- Nominations: 850

Throughout his career, Canadian singer Justin Bieber has sold an estimated 150 million records worldwide, making him one of the best-selling music artists of all time.

In 2011, Bieber was honoured with a medallion in front of Avon Theater in Stratford, Ontario, Canada, where he used to busk when he was younger. On November 23, 2012, Bieber was presented with the Queen Elizabeth II Diamond Jubilee Medal by the former Prime Minister of Canada, Stephen Harper. He was one of 60,000 Canadians to receive the Diamond Jubilee medal that year. In 2013, Bieber received a Diamond award from the Recording Industry Association of America (RIAA) for his hit single "Baby", which became the then-highest-certified digital single of all time. At age 19, Bieber received the Milestone Award at the 2013 Billboard Music Awards in recognition for breaking boundaries with his creativity and contribution to the musical landscape. Bieber is credited with five Diamond certifications from the RIAA.

Bieber has won two Grammy Awards out of 27 nominations, one Latin Grammy Award, eight Juno Awards, two Brit Awards, 26 Billboard Music Awards, 22 ASCAP Awards, and numerous fan voted accolades which include 19 American Music Awards, 23 Teen Choice Awards (the most wins for a male individual), nine Nickelodeon Kids' Choice Awards (the most wins for a male musician), eight iHeartRadio Music Awards, and six MTV Video Music Awards. He has also won a record 22 MTV Europe Music Awards (the most wins for any artist) and set 35 Guinness World Records.

== Honours ==
Year	Nominee / work	Award	Result	Ref.
2012	Justin Bieber	Queen Elizabeth II Diamond Jubilee Medal	Won	

== 3Music Awards ==
The 3Music Awards is a Ghanaian music awards ceremony held annually since 2018 to celebrate Ghanaian music.

Year	Nominee / work	Award	Result	Ref.
2022	"Essence (Remix)" (with Wizkid and Tems)	African Song of the Year	Won	

== Academy of Country Music Awards ==
The Academy of Country Music Awards, also known as the ACM Awards, is a country music awards program that honours and showcases the biggest names and emerging talent in the country music industry. Bieber has received three nominations.

Year	Nominee / work	Award	Result	Ref.
2020	"10,000 Hours" (with Dan + Shay)	Song of the Year	Nominated	
2020	"10,000 Hours" (with Dan + Shay)	Music Event of the Year	Nominated	
2020	"10,000 Hours" (with Dan + Shay)	Video of the Year	Nominated	

== African Muzik Magazine Awards ==
The African Muzik Magazine Awards (commonly abbreviated as AFRIMMA) is an annual African music awards ceremony aimed at rewarding and celebrating musical works, talents, and creativity around the African continent.

Year	Nominee / work	Award	Result	Ref.
2021	"Essence (Remix)" (with Wizkid and Tems)	Song of the Year	Won	

== American Music Awards ==
The American Music Awards (AMAs) is an annual ceremony that was created by Dick Clark in 1973. Bieber has received a total of 19 awards out of 30 nominations.

Year	Nominee / work	Award	Result	Ref.
2010	Justin Bieber	Artist of the Year	Won	
2010	Justin Bieber	New Artist of the Year	Won	
2010	Justin Bieber	Favorite Pop/Rock Male Artist	Won	
2010	My World 2.0	Favorite Pop/Rock Album	Won	
2011	Justin Bieber	Favorite Pop/Rock Male Artist	Nominated	
2012	Justin Bieber	Artist of the Year	Won	
2012	Justin Bieber	Favorite Pop/Rock Male Artist	Won	
2012	Believe	Favorite Pop/Rock Album	Won	
2015	"Where Are Ü Now" (with Jack Ü)	Collaboration of the Year	Won	
2016	Justin Bieber	Artist of the Year	Nominated	
2016	Justin Bieber	Favorite Pop/Rock Male Artist	Won	
2016	Purpose	Favorite Pop/Rock Album	Won	
2016	"Love Yourself"	Favorite Pop/Rock Song	Won	
2016	"Sorry"	Video of the Year	Won	
2017	"I'm the One" (with DJ Khaled, Quavo, Chance the Rapper, & Lil Wayne)	Favorite Rap/Hip-Hop Song	Won	
2017	"I'm the One" (with DJ Khaled, Quavo, Chance the Rapper, & Lil Wayne)	Collaboration of the Year	Nominated	
2017	"Despacito" (with Luis Fonsi & Daddy Yankee)	Collaboration of the Year	Won	
2017	"Despacito" (with Luis Fonsi & Daddy Yankee)	Favorite Pop/Rock Song	Won	
2020	Justin Bieber	Artist of the Year	Nominated	
2020	Justin Bieber	Favorite Pop/Rock Male Artist	Won	
2020	"10,000 Hours" (with Dan + Shay)	Collaboration of the Year	Won	
2020	"10,000 Hours" (with Dan + Shay)	Favorite Country Song	Won	
2021	Justin Bieber	Favorite Pop/Rock Male Artist	Nominated	
2021	"Peaches" (featuring Daniel Caesar and Giveon)	Collaboration of the Year	Nominated	
2022	"Stay" (with The Kid Laroi)	Collaboration of the Year	Nominated	
2022	"Stay" (with The Kid Laroi)	Favourite Pop Song	Nominated	
2026	Justin Bieber	Artist of the Year	Nominated	
2026	Justin Bieber	Best Male Pop Artist	Won	
2026	Swag	Album of the Year	Nominated	
2026	Swag	Best R&B Album	Nominated	

== APRA Awards ==
The APRA Awards is an Australian annual awards show that honors musicians who have achieved outstanding success in sales and airplay performance. Bieber is credited with two wins out of four nominations.

Year	Nominee / work	Award	Result	Ref.
2017	"Love Yourself"	International Work of the Year	Nominated	
2017	"Sorry"	International Work of the Year	Nominated	
2022	"Stay" (with The Kid Laroi)	Song of the Year	Won	
2023	"Stay" (with The Kid Laroi)	Most Performed Pop Work	Won	

== ARIA Music Awards ==
The Australian Recording Industry Association Music Awards (ARIAs) were first held in 1987 in Sydney. Bieber has received three nominations.

Year	Nominee / work	Award	Result	Ref.
2016	Justin Bieber - Purpose	Best International Artist	Nominated	
2020	Justin Bieber - Changes	Best International Artist	Nominated	
2021	Justin Bieber - Justice	Best International Artist	Nominated	

== ASCAP Awards ==
The American Society of Composers, Authors and Publishers (ASCAP) is a not-for-profit performance rights organization that honors members of the music community in a series of annual awards shows in various music categories. Bieber has won 22 awards.

Year	Nominee / work	Award	Result	Ref.
2012	Justin Bieber: Never Say Never (with Deborah Lurie)	Top Box Office Film	Won	
2013	"As Long as You Love Me"	Most Performed Song	Won	
2014	"As Long as You Love Me"	Most Performed Song	Won	
2014	"Beauty And A Beat" (feat. Nicki Minaj)	Most Performed Song	Won	
2016	"What Do You Mean?"	Most Performed Song	Won	
2016	"Where Are Ü Now" (with Jack Ü)	Most Performed Song	Won	
2017	"Love Yourself"	Song of the Year	Won	
2017	"Sorry"	Winning Pop Song	Won	
2017	"Cold Water" (with Major Lazer & MØ)	Winning Pop Song	Won	
2017	"Let Me Love You" (with DJ Snake)	Winning Pop Song	Won	
2018	"I'm the One" (with DJ Khaled, Quavo, Chance the Rapper, & Lil Wayne)	Winning R&B/Hip-Hop Song	Won	
2020	"I Don't Care"	Winning Pop Song	Won	
2020	"10,000 Hours (with Dan Smyers)"	Winning Country Songwriter & Publisher	Won	
2021	"10,000 Hours (with Dan Smyers)"	Winning Pop Songwriter & Publisher	Won	
2021	"Intentions" (feat. Quavo)	Winning Pop Songwriter & Publisher	Won	
2022	"Holy"	Winning Pop Songwriter & Publisher	Won	
2022	"Lonely"	Winning Pop Songwriter & Publisher	Won	
2022	"Stay"	Winning Pop Songwriter & Publisher	Won	
2022	"Peaches"	Winning Pop Songwriter & Publisher	Won	
2022	"Peaches"	Winning R&B/Hip-Hop & Rap Song	Won	
2023	"Stay"	Song of the Year	Won	
2023	"Ghost"	Winning Pop Songwriter & Publisher	Won	

== Bambi Awards ==
The Bambi Awards are presented annually by Hubert Burda Media to recognise excellence in international media and television "with vision and creativity who affected and inspired the German public that year, both domestic and foreign. Bieber has won an award.

Year	Nominee / work	Award	Result	Ref.
2011	Justin Bieber	Entertainment	Won	

== BBC Radio 1 Teen's Awards ==
The BBC Radio 1 Teen's Awards is the event to honours the UK's unsung teenage heroes as well as the year's best music, online, sport and entertainment stars. Bieber was nominated once.

Year	Nominee / work	Award	Result	Ref.
2017	Justin Bieber	Best International Artist	Nominated	

== BET Awards ==
The BET Awards is an American award show that was established in 2001 by the Black Entertainment Television network to celebrate African Americans in music, acting, sports and other fields of entertainment annually. Bieber has won an award out of three nominations.

Year	Nominee / work	Award	Result	Ref.
2010	Justin Bieber	Best New Artist	Nominated	
2010	Justin Bieber	Fandemonium Award	Nominated	
2022	Essence (Remix) (with Wizkid and Tems)	Best Collaboration	Won	

== Billboard Awards ==
=== Billboard Japan Music Awards ===
The Billboard Japan Music Awards are held annually in Japan. The artists are eligible for the prize by topping one of the Billboard Japan charts.

Year	Nominee / work	Award	Result	Ref.
2010	"Baby" (feat. Ludacris)	Hot 100 Airplay of the Year	Won	

=== Billboard Latin Music Awards ===
The Billboard Latin Music Awards is the Latin version of the Billboard Music Awards. Bieber has won nine awards out of 10 nominations.

Year	Nominee / work	Award	Result	Ref.
2016	Justin Bieber	Crossover Artist of the Year	Won	
2017	Justin Bieber	Crossover Artist of the Year	Won	
2018	Justin Bieber	Crossover Artist of the Year	Won	
2018	Justin Bieber	Songwriter of the Year	Nominated	
2018	"Despacito" (with Luis Fonsi & Daddy Yankee)	Hot Latin Song of the Year	Won	
2018	"Despacito" (with Luis Fonsi & Daddy Yankee)	Hot Latin Song of the Year — Vocal Event	Won	
2018	"Despacito" (with Luis Fonsi & Daddy Yankee)	Airplay Song of the Year	Won	
2018	"Despacito" (with Luis Fonsi & Daddy Yankee)	Digital Song of the Year	Won	
2018	"Despacito" (with Luis Fonsi & Daddy Yankee)	Streaming Song of the Year	Won	
2018	"Despacito" (with Luis Fonsi & Daddy Yankee)	Latin Pop Song of the Year	Won	

=== Billboard Live Music Awards ===
Billboard honors the industry's top artists, venues and professionals of the year at the annual Billboard Live Music Awards reception. These awards are based primarily on the Billboard Boxscore chart, recognizing true box office success and industry achievement.

Year	Nominee / work	Award	Result	Ref.
2013	Justin Bieber	Eventful Fan's Choice Award	Nominated	
2016	Purpose World Tour	Top Package	Won	
2016	Purpose World Tour / Calvin Klein	Concert Marketing & Promotion Award	Nominated	

=== Billboard Music Awards ===
The Billboard Music Awards are sponsored by Billboard magazine to honor artists and their chart performance. Bieber has won 26 awards out of 76 nominations.

Year	Nominee / work	Award	Result	Ref.
2011	Justin Bieber	Top Artist	Nominated	
2011	Justin Bieber	Top New Artist	Won	
2011	Justin Bieber	Top Male Artist	Nominated	
2011	Justin Bieber	Top Billboard 200 Artist	Nominated	
2011	Justin Bieber	Top Streaming Artist	Won	
2011	Justin Bieber	Top Social Artist	Won	
2011	Justin Bieber	Top Digital Media Artist	Won	
2011	Justin Bieber	Top Pop Artist	Nominated	
2011	Justin Bieber	Billboard.com Fan Favorite	Won	
2011	My World 2.0	Top Billboard 200 Album	Nominated	
2011	My World 2.0	Top Pop Album	Won	
2011	"Baby" (feat. Ludacris)	Top Streaming Song (Video)	Won	
2012	Justin Bieber	Top Male Artist	Nominated	
2012	Justin Bieber	Top Billboard 200 Artist	Nominated	
2012	Justin Bieber	Top Social Artist	Won	
2012	Justin Bieber	Top Digital Media Artist	Nominated	
2012	Under the Mistletoe	Top Pop Album	Nominated	
2013	Justin Bieber	Top Artist	Nominated	
2013	Justin Bieber	Top Male Artist	Won	
2013	Justin Bieber	Top Billboard 200 Artist	Nominated	
2013	Justin Bieber	Top Social Artist	Won	
2013	Justin Bieber	Top Pop Artist	Nominated	
2013	Justin Bieber	Milestone Award	Won	
2013	Believe	Top Pop Album	Nominated	
2014	Justin Bieber	Top Social Artist	Won	
2015	Justin Bieber	Top Social Artist	Won	
2016	Justin Bieber	Top Artist	Nominated	
2016	Justin Bieber	Top Male Artist	Won	
2016	Justin Bieber	Top Billboard 200 Artist	Nominated	
2016	Justin Bieber	Top Hot 100 Artist	Nominated	
2016	Justin Bieber	Top Song Sales Artist	Nominated	
2016	Justin Bieber	Top Radio Songs Artist	Nominated	
2016	Justin Bieber	Top Streaming Artist	Nominated	
2016	Justin Bieber	Top Social Artist	Won	
2016	Purpose	Top Billboard 200 Album	Nominated	
2016	"Sorry"	Top Streaming Song (Audio)	Nominated	
2016	"What Do You Mean?"	Top Streaming Song (Audio)	Nominated	
2016	"Where Are Ü Now" (with Jack Ü)	Top Dance/Electronic Song	Nominated	
2017	Justin Bieber	Top Artist	Nominated	
2017	Justin Bieber	Top Male Artist	Nominated	
2017	Justin Bieber	Top Radio Songs Artist	Nominated	
2017	Justin Bieber	Top Social Artist	Nominated	
2017	Justin Bieber	Top Touring Artist	Nominated	
2017	"Cold Water" (with Major Lazer & MØ)	Top Dance/Electronic Song	Nominated	
2017	"Let Me Love You" (with DJ Snake)	Top Dance/Electronic Song	Nominated	
2018	Justin Bieber	Top Social Artist	Nominated	
2018	"Despacito" (with Luis Fonsi & Daddy Yankee)	Top Hot 100 Song	Won	
2018	"Despacito" (with Luis Fonsi & Daddy Yankee)	Top Streaming Song (Audio)	Nominated	
2018	"Despacito" (with Luis Fonsi & Daddy Yankee)	Top Streaming Song (Video)	Won	
2018	"Despacito" (with Luis Fonsi & Daddy Yankee)	Top Selling Song	Won	
2018	"Despacito" (with Luis Fonsi & Daddy Yankee)	Top Collaboration	Won	
2018	"Despacito" (with Luis Fonsi & Daddy Yankee)	Top Latin Song	Won	
2018	"I'm the One" (with DJ Khaled, Quavo, Chance the Rapper, & Lil Wayne)	Top Rap Song	Nominated	
2019	"No Brainer" (with DJ Khaled, Quavo and Chance the Rapper)	Top R&B Song	Nominated	
2020	"10,000 Hours" (with Dan + Shay)	Top Country Song	Won	
2020	"I Don't Care" (with Ed Sheeran)	Top Radio Song	Nominated	
2020	"I Don't Care" (with Ed Sheeran)	Top Collaboration	Nominated	
2020	Changes	Top R&B Album	Nominated	
2021	Justin Bieber	Top Song Sales Artist	Nominated	
2021	Justin Bieber	Top Radio Songs Artist	Nominated	
2021	Justin Bieber	Top R&B Artist	Nominated	
2021	Justin Bieber	Top R&B Male Artist	Nominated	
2021	"Intentions" (feat. Quavo)	Top R&B Song	Nominated	
2022	Justin Bieber	Top Male Artist	Nominated	
2022	Justin Bieber	Top Hot 100 Artist	Nominated	
2022	Justin Bieber	Top Radio Songs Artist	Nominated	
2022	Justin Bieber	Top Billboard Global 200 Artist	Nominated	
2022	"Stay" (with The Kid Laroi)	Top Hot 100 Song	Won	
2022	"Stay" (with The Kid Laroi)	Top Streaming Song	Won	
2022	"Stay" (with The Kid Laroi)	Top Radio Song	Nominated	
2022	"Stay" (with The Kid Laroi)	Top Billboard Global 200 Song	Won	
2022	"Stay" (with The Kid Laroi)	Top Billboard Global (Excl. U.S.) Song	Won	
2022	"Stay" (with The Kid Laroi)	Top Collaboration	Won	
2022	"Peaches" (feat. Daniel Caesar and Giveon)	Top Collaboration	Nominated	
2022	"Peaches" (feat. Daniel Caesar and Giveon)	Top R&B Song	Nominated	
2022	"Essence (Remix)" (with Wizkid and Tems)	Top R&B Song	Nominated	

=== Billboard.com Mid-Year Music Awards ===
Year	Nominee / work	Award	Result	Ref.
2012	Justin Bieber	Most Overrated Artist	Won	
2013	Justin Bieber	Most Overrated Artist	Won	
2013	Justin Bieber's Chaotic European Tour	Most Disappointing	Nominated	
2013	Believe Acoustic	Favorite Billboard 200 No. 1 Album	Nominated	
2013	Justin Bieber vs. Black Keys' Pat Carney	Most Memorable Feud	Nominated	

== Black Reel Awards ==
The Black Reel Awards began in 2000 and were designed to annually recognize and celebrate the achievements of black people in feature, independent and television films.

Year	Nominee / work	Award	Result	Ref.
2011	"Never Say Never" (feat. Jaden Smith)	Outstanding Original Song	Nominated	

== Bravo Otto ==
The Bravo Otto is a German accolade honoring excellence of performers in film, television and music. The award is presented in gold, silver, and bronze categories.

Year	Nominee / work	Award	Result	Ref.
2010	Justin Bieber	Male Singer	Gold	
2011	Justin Bieber	Super Singer – Male	Gold	
2011	Justin Bieber	Internet Star	Silver	
2012	Justin Bieber	Super Singer – Male	Bronze	
2013	Justin Bieber	Superstar	Silver	
2013	Justin Bieber	Checker of the Year	Silver	
2013	Justin Bieber & Chris Brown	Super-BFFs	Silver	
2015	Justin Bieber	Super Singer – Male	Bronze	
2021	Justin Bieber	International Singer	Bronze	

== Brit Awards ==
The Brit Awards are the British Phonographic Industry's annual pop music awards. Bieber has won two awards out of four nominations.

Year	Nominee / work	Award	Result	Ref.
2011	Justin Bieber	International Breakthrough Act	Won	
2016	Justin Bieber	International Male Solo Artist	Won	
2020	"I Don't Care" (with Ed Sheeran)	Song of the Year	Nominated	
2022	"Stay" (with The Kid Laroi)	International Song of the Year	Nominated	

== Canadian Fragrance Awards ==
The Canadian Fragrance Awards is an annual gala honouring and celebrating the year's best fragrance held by Cosmetics magazine's Canadian Fragrance & Beauty Awards.

Year	Nominee / work	Award	Result	Ref.
2012	"Someday"	Consumers’ Choice – Women	Won	
2012	"Someday"	Best Full Market Launch – Women's Mass	Nominated	

== Canadian Radio Music Awards ==
The Canadian Radio Music Awards are an annual series of awards presented by the Canadian Association of Broadcasters that are part of Canadian Music Week.

Year	Nominee / work	Award	Result	Ref.
2011	"Baby" (feat. Ludacris)	CHR	Nominated	
2011	Justin Bieber	Fans' Choice	Nominated	
2013	Justin Bieber	Fans' Choice	Nominated	
2016	Justin Bieber	Fans' Choice	Nominated	
2017	Justin Bieber	Fans' Choice	Nominated	
2017	Justin Bieber	Chart Topper Award	Won	
2017	"Love Yourself"	SOCAN Song of the Year	Won	
2017	"Sorry"	SOCAN Song of the Year	Nominated	

== Circle Chart Music Awards ==
The Circle Chart Music Awards are presented annually in South Korea to recognise commercial performance of songs and albums based on the national music record chart Circle Music Chart.

Year	Nominee / work	Award	Result	Ref.
2021	"Peaches" (feat. Daniel Caesar and Giveon)	International Song of the Year	Won	
2022	"Stay" (with The Kid Laroi)	International Song of the Year	Won	

Note: Bieber is the first solo artist to win "International Song of the Year" in consecutive years, and the first act overall since Maroon 5 in 2012.

== Channel [V] Thailand Music Video Awards ==
The Channel V Thailand Music Video Awards was established in 2002 by Channel [V] Thailand. The awards gives recognition and awards to Thai, International artist and Thai Music Video director.

Year	Nominee / work	Award	Result	Ref.
2011	"Baby"	Popular International Music Video	Won	
2011	Justin Bieber	Popular International New Artist	Won	
2011	Justin Bieber	Popular International Male Artist	Won	

== Clio Awards ==
The Clio Music Awards is an annual awards show that recognises the creative contributions of the marketers and communicators that propel the music industry. Bieber has won six awards.

Year	Nominee / work	Award	Result	Ref.
2016	"Where Are Ü Now" (with Jack Ü)	Silver Award for Best Music Videos	Won	
2020	"New Year's Eve Live With Justin Bieber" for T-Mobile	Silver Award for Best Experience/Activation	Won	
2020	"New Year's Eve Live With Justin Bieber" for T-Mobile	Silver Award for Best Partnerships & Collaborations	Won	
2020	"New Year's Eve Live With Justin Bieber" for T-Mobile	Shortlist for Best Branded Entertainment & Content	Won	
2022	"Justin Bieber – Live in the Metaverse" for Wave	Bronze Award for Best Experience/Activation	Won	
2022	"#BieberWave – An Interactive Virtual Experience" for Wave	Shortlist for Best Innovation	Won	

== CMT Music Awards ==
The CMT Music Awards is an annual awards show honoring country music videos. Bieber won the "Collaborative Video of the Year" award in 2011.

Year	Nominee / work	Award	Result	Ref.
2011	"That Should Be Me" (with Rascal Flatts)	Collaborative Video of the Year	Won	

== Country Music Association Awards ==
The Country Music Association Awards, also known as the CMA Awards or CMAs, is an annual awards show recognizing outstanding achievement in the country music industry.

Year	Nominee / work	Award	Result
2020	"10,000 Hours" (with Dan + Shay)	Music Video of the Year	Nominated
2020	"10,000 Hours" (with Dan + Shay)	Single of the Year	Nominated
2020	"10,000 Hours" (with Dan + Shay)	Musical Event of the Year	Nominated

== Danish Music Awards ==
The Danish Music Awards (DMA) is a Danish award show. Bieber has received two awards out of five nominations.

Year	Nominee / work	Award	Result	Ref.
2016	Purpose	International Album of the Year	Won	
2016	"Love Yourself"	International Hit of the Year	Won	
2016	"Sorry"	International Hit of the Year	Nominated	
2016	"What Do You Mean?"	International Hit of the Year	Nominated	
2017	"Let Me Love You" (with DJ Snake)	International Hit of the Year	Nominated	

== Dorian Awards ==
The Dorian Awards are an annual endeavor organized by the Gay and Lesbian Entertainment Critics Association (GALECA).

Year	Nominee / work	Award	Result	Ref.
2012	Justin Bieber: Never Say Never	Campy Film of the Year	Nominated	

== Do Something Awards ==
The Do Something Awards are hosted every year to award athletes, music artists and actors that have portrayed a social issue. Bieber has received an award.

Year	Nominee / work	Award	Result	Ref.
2011	Justin Bieber	Do Something Music Artist	Won	
2012	Justin Bieber	Do Something Twitter	Nominated	
2012	Justin Bieber & Selena Gomez	Do Something Couple	Nominated	

== Echo Awards ==
Year	Nominee / work	Award	Result	Ref.
2016	Justin Bieber	Best International Rock/Pop Male Artist	Nominated	

== Electronic Music Awards ==
The Electronic Music Awards is an award show focused on the electronic music genre that debuted on September 21, 2017, in Los Angeles. Bieber has won an award out of two nominations.

Year	Nominee / work	Award	Result	Ref.
2017	"Cold Water" (with Major Lazer and MØ)	Single of the Year	Won	
2017	"Let Me Love You" (with DJ Snake)	Single of the Year	Nominated	

== FiFi Awards ==
The FiFi Awards are an annual event sponsored by The Fragrance Foundation which honor the fragrance industry's creative achievements and is the most prominent and prestigious celebratory event of the fragrance industry.

Year	Nominee / work	Award	Result	Ref.
2012	"Someday"	Fragrance Of The Year: Women's Luxe	Nominated	
2012	"Someday"	Fragrance Of The Year: Consumer's Choice	Nominated	
2012	"Someday"	Fragrance Celebrity Of The Year	Won	
2013	"Girlfriend"	Fragrance Of The Year: Women's Popular	Won	
2013	"Girlfriend"	Fragrance Of The Year: Consumer's Choice	Won	
2014	"The Key"	Fragrance Of The Year: Women's Popular	Nominated	

=== UK Fifi Awards ===
The UK FiFi Awards are an annual event which honor the fragrance industry's creative achievements and is among the most prestigious celebratory events in the UK fragrance industry.

Year	Nominee / work	Award	Result	Ref.
2012	Someday	Best New Celebrity Fragrance	Won	

== GAFFA Awards ==
=== GAFFA Awards (Denmark) ===
Year	Nominee / work	Award	Result	Ref.
2015	Purpose	International Album of the Year	Nominated	
2015	Justin Bieber	International Male Artist of the Year	Nominated	
2015	"What Do You Mean?"	International Hit of the Year	Nominated	
2016	"Cold Water" (with Major Lazer & MØ)	International Hit of the Year	Nominated	
2016	"Love Yourself"	International Hit of the Year	Nominated	
2018	"I'm the One" (with DJ Khaled, Quavo, Chance the Rapper & Lil Wayne)	International Hit of the Year	Nominated	
2018	"Friends" (feat. BloodPop)	International Hit of the Year	Nominated	
2018	"Despacito" (with Luis Fonsi & Daddy Yankee)	International Hit of the Year	Nominated	
2018	"2U" (with David Guetta)	International Hit of the Year	Nominated	

== Georgia Music Hall of Fame ==
The Georgia Music Hall of Fame was located in downtown Macon, Georgia, United States, from 1996 until it closed in 2011.

Year	Nominee / work	Award	Result	Ref.
2011	Justin Bieber	Bill Lowery Horizon Award	Won	

== Global Awards ==
The Global Awards are held by Global Media & Entertainment and reward music played on the British radio stations. Bieber has won an award out of five nominations.

Year	Nominee / work	Award	Result
2018	Justin Bieber	Best Male	Nominated
2020	"I Don't Care" (with Ed Sheeran)	Best Song	Nominated
2022	Justin Bieber	Best Male	Nominated
2022	Justin Bieber	Best Pop	Won
2023	"Stay" (with The Kid Laroi)	Best Song	Nominated

== Grammy Awards ==
The Grammy Awards are awarded by the National Academy of Recording Arts and Sciences. They honor artistic achievement, technical proficiency and overall excellence in the recording industry, without regard to album sales or chart position. Bieber has won two awards out of 27 nominations.

Year	Nominee / work	Award	Result	Ref.
2011	Justin Bieber	Best New Artist	Nominated	
2011	My World 2.0	Best Pop Vocal Album	Nominated	
2016	"Where Are Ü Now" (with Jack Ü)	Best Dance/Electronic Recording	Won	
2017	Purpose	Album of the Year	Nominated	
2017	Purpose	Best Pop Vocal Album	Nominated	
2017	"Love Yourself"	Song of the Year	Nominated	
2017	"Love Yourself"	Best Pop Solo Performance	Nominated	
2018	"Despacito" (with Luis Fonsi and Daddy Yankee)	Record of the Year	Nominated	
2018	"Despacito" (with Luis Fonsi and Daddy Yankee)	Song of the Year	Nominated	
2018	"Despacito" (with Luis Fonsi and Daddy Yankee)	Best Pop Duo/Group Performance	Nominated	
2021	"Yummy"	Best Pop Solo Performance	Nominated	
2021	"Intentions" (feat. Quavo)	Best Pop Duo/Group Performance	Nominated	
2021	Changes	Best Pop Vocal Album	Nominated	
2021	"10,000 Hours" (with Dan + Shay)	Best Country Duo/Group Performance	Won	
2022	"Peaches" (feat. Daniel Caesar and Giveon)	Record of the Year	Nominated	
2022	"Peaches" (feat. Daniel Caesar and Giveon)	Song of the Year	Nominated	
2022	"Peaches" (feat. Daniel Caesar and Giveon)	Best R&B Performance	Nominated	
2022	"Peaches" (feat. Daniel Caesar and Giveon)	Best Music Video	Nominated	
2022	Justice	Album of the Year	Nominated	
2022	Justice	Best Pop Vocal Album	Nominated	
2022	"Anyone"	Best Pop Solo Performance	Nominated	
2022	"Lonely" (with Benny Blanco)	Best Pop Duo/Group Performance	Nominated	
2023	Justin Bieber: Our World	Best Music Film	Nominated	
2026	Swag	Album of the Year	Nominated	
2026	Swag	Best Pop Vocal Album	Nominated	
2026	"Daisies"	Best Pop Solo Performance	Nominated	
2026	"Yukon"	Best R&B Performance	Nominated	

Note: "Born to Be Somebody" (from: Justin Bieber: Never Say Never) was also nominated for Best Song Written for Visual Media in 2012, but in this category the award goes to the composer(s) of the song, not to the performing artist(s). The song was written and composed by Diane Warren.

== Guinness World Records ==
The Guinness World Records honors the year's most impressive acts. Bieber has set 35 records.

Year the record was awarded, name of the record holder, and the name of the record
Year	Nominee / work	World record	Record Status	Ref.
2011	Justin Bieber	First Solo Artist to Have Three No.1 US Albums Before the Age of 18	Record	
2012	"Baby" (with Ludacris)	Most Popular Video of Any Kind Online	Record	
2012	Justin Bieber	Most Widespread Social Network Message in 24 Hours	Record	
2013	Justin Bieber	Youngest Solo Artist to Achieve Five No.1 US Albums	Record	
2013	Justin Bieber	First Music Act with a Music Channel Viewed Three Billion Times	Record	
2015	Justin Bieber	Youngest Male Solo Artist to Debut at No.1 on the Billboard Hot 100	Record	
2016	"What Do You Mean?"	Most Streamed Track on Spotify in One Week	Eliminated	
2016	Purpose	Most Streamed Album on Spotify in One Week	Eliminated	
2016	Justin Bieber	Most Simultaneous Tracks on the Billboard Hot 100	Eliminated	
2016	Justin Bieber	Most Simultaneous New Entries on the Hot 100 by a Solo Artist	Eliminated	
2016	Justin Bieber	First Act to Occupy Top Three Positions Simultaneously on UK Singles Chart	Record	
2016	Justin Bieber	Most Followers on Twitter (Male)	Eliminated	
2016	Justin Bieber	Most Viewed Music Channel on YouTube (Individual)	Eliminated	
2016	Justin Bieber	Most Subscribers on YouTube for a Musician (Male)	Record	
2016	Justin Bieber	Most Teen Choice Awards Won by a Musician (Male)	Record	
2016	Justin Bieber	Most Teen Choice Awards Won by an Individual (Male)	Record	
2017	Justin Bieber	Most Weeks at No.1 on Billboard's Social 50 Chart	Eliminated	
2017	Purpose	Most Streamed Album on Spotify	Eliminated	
2017	Justin Bieber	Most MTV Europe Music Awards Won	Record	
2017	Justin Bieber	Most Followers on Instagram for a Musician (Male)	Record	
2017	"Despacito" (with Luis Fonsi and Daddy Yankee)	Most Streamed Track Worldwide	Record	
2017	"Despacito" (with Luis Fonsi and Daddy Yankee)	Most Weeks at No.1 on Billboard's Digital Song Sales Chart	Eliminated	
2017	"Despacito" (with Luis Fonsi and Daddy Yankee)	Most Weeks at No.1 in the USA (Single)	Eliminated	
2018	Justin Bieber: Never Say Never	Highest-Grossing Concert or Performance Film at the Global Box Office	Eliminated	
2018	"Despacito" (with Luis Fonsi and Daddy Yankee)	Most Weeks at No.1 on Billboard's Hot Latin Songs Chart (One Song)	Record	
2019	"I Don't Care" (with Ed Sheeran)	Most Streamed Track on Spotify in 24 Hours (Male)	Eliminated	
2020	Justin Bieber	Youngest Solo Artist to Achieve Seven No.1 US Albums	Record	
2020	Justin Bieber	Most Songs to Debut at No.1 on the Billboard Hot 100	Eliminated	
2021	Justin Bieber	Most Followers on X (formerly Twitter) for a Male Pop Star	Record	
2021	Justin Bieber	Most Monthly Listeners on Spotify (Male)	Eliminated	
2021	"Stay" (with The Kid Laroi)	Most Streamed Track on Spotify in One Week (Male)	Eliminated	
2021	Justin Bieber	Youngest Solo Artist to Have 100 Entries on the US Hot 100	Eliminated	
2022	Justin Bieber	Most Nickelodeon Kids' Choice Awards Won by a Musician (Male)	Record	
2022	Justin Bieber	Most Consecutive Weeks in Top 10 of US Hot 100 (Male)	Record	
2024	"Stay" (with The Kid Laroi)	Most Streamed Track on Spotify (Duo or Group)	Record	

== Hungarian Music Awards ==
The Hungarian Music Awards have been given to artists in the field of Hungarian music since 1992.

Year	Nominee / work	Award	Result	Ref.
2017	"Cold Water" (with Major Lazer and MØ)	Foreign Electronic Music Album or Sound Recording of the Year	Nominated	
2018	"2U" (with David Guetta)	Foreign Electronic Music Album or Sound Recording of the Year	Nominated	

== iHeartRadio Awards ==
=== iHeartRadio Much Music Video Awards ===
The iHeartRadio Much Music Video Awards (also known as the MMVAs) were an annual award show presented by the Canadian music video channel MuchMusic to honor the year's best music videos. Bieber has won 12 awards out of 21 nominations.

Year	Nominee / work	Award	Result	Ref.
2010	"One Time"	International Video of the Year by a Canadian	Nominated	
2010	"Baby" (feat. Ludacris)	International Video of the Year by a Canadian	Won	
2010	"Baby" (feat. Ludacris)	Your Fave: Video	Won	
2010	Justin Bieber	Your Fave: New Artist	Won	
2011	Justin Bieber	Your Fave: Artist	Won	
2011	"Somebody to Love" (feat. Usher)	International Video of the Year by a Canadian	Won	
2011	"Somebody to Love" (feat. Usher)	MuchMUSIC.COM Most Watched Video	Nominated	
2012	"Next to You" (with Chris Brown)	International Video of the Year - Artist	Nominated	
2012	"Boyfriend"	International Video of the Year by a Canadian	Won	
2012	Justin Bieber	Your Fave: Artist or Group	Won	
2013	Justin Bieber	Your Fave: Artist or Group	Won	
2013	"As Long as You Love Me" (feat. Big Sean)	International Video of the Year by a Canadian	Nominated	
2014	"All That Matters"	International Video of the Year by a Canadian	Nominated	
2014	Justin Bieber	Your Fave: Artist or Group	Won	
2015	Justin Bieber	Fan Fave Artist or Group	Won	
2015	Justin Bieber	Most Buzzworthy Canadian	Nominated	
2016	Justin Bieber	Most Buzzworthy Canadian	Nominated	
2016	"Sorry"	Canadian Single of the Year	Nominated	
2016	Justin Bieber	Fan Fave Artist or Group	Won	
2017	Justin Bieber	Most Buzzworthy Canadian	Nominated	
2017	Justin Bieber	Fan Fave Artist or Group	Won	

=== iHeartRadio Music Awards ===
The iHeartRadio Music Awards is an international music awards show founded by iHeartRadio in 2014. Bieber has won eight awards from 42 nominations.

Year	Nominee / work	Award	Result	Ref.
2016	Justin Bieber	Male Artist of the Year	Won	
2016	Beliebers	Best Fan Army	Won	
2016	"Where Are Ü Now" (with Jack Ü)	Dance Song of the Year	Won	
2016	"Where Are Ü Now" (with Jack Ü)	Best Collaboration	Nominated	
2016	"Hotline Bling" (Justin Bieber cover)	Best Cover Song	Nominated	
2017	Justin Bieber	Male Artist of the Year	Won	
2017	"Cold Water" (with Major Lazer and MØ)	Dance Song of the Year	Nominated	
2017	"Let Me Love You" (with DJ Snake)	Dance Song of the Year	Nominated	
2017	"Love Yourself"	Best Lyrics	Won	
2017	Justin Bieber covering "Fast Car"	Best Cover Song	Nominated	
2017	Beliebers	Best Fan Army	Nominated	
2018	"Despacito Remix" (with Luis Fonsi and Daddy Yankee)	Song Of The Year	Nominated	
2018	"Despacito Remix" (with Luis Fonsi and Daddy Yankee)	Best Remix	Nominated	
2018	"Friends Remix" (with Julia Michaels)	Best Remix	Nominated	
2018	"I'm The One" (with DJ Khaled, Chance the Rapper, Quavo and Lil Wayne)	Best Music Video	Nominated	
2018	"I'm The One" (with DJ Khaled, Chance the Rapper, Quavo and Lil Wayne)	Best Collaboration	Nominated	
2018	Beliebers	Best Fan Army	Nominated	
2019	Beliebers	Best Fan Army	Nominated	
2020	"10,000 Hours" (with Dan + Shay)	Best Lyrics	Won	
2020	"I Don't Care" (with Ed Sheeran)	Best Collaboration	Nominated	
2020	"I Don't Care" (with Ed Sheeran)	Best Music Video	Nominated	
2020	"Bad Guy Remix" (with Billie Eilish)	Best Remix	Nominated	
2020	Beliebers	Best Fan Army	Nominated	
2021	Justin Bieber	Male Artist of the Year	Nominated	
2021	"Yummy"	Best Music Video	Nominated	
2021	"Holy" (feat. Chance the Rapper)	Best Collaboration	Nominated	
2021	"Intentions" (feat. Quavo)	Best Lyrics	Nominated	
2021	Beliebers	Best Fan Army	Nominated	
2022	Justin Bieber	Male Artist of the Year	Nominated	
2022	"Peaches" (feat. Daniel Caesar and Giveon)	Song of the Year	Nominated	
2022	"Peaches" (feat. Daniel Caesar and Giveon)	Best Music Video	Nominated	
2022	"Peaches" (feat. Daniel Caesar and Giveon)	Best Collaboration	Nominated	
2022	"Stay" (with The Kid Laroi)	Song of the Year	Nominated	
2022	"Stay" (with The Kid Laroi)	Best Music Video	Nominated	
2022	"Stay" (with The Kid Laroi)	Best Collaboration	Won	
2022	"Stay" (with The Kid Laroi)	iHeartRadio Chart Ruler Award	Won	
2022	"Stay" (with The Kid Laroi)	TikTok Bop of the Year	Nominated	
2022	Beliebers	Best Fan Army	Nominated	
2023	Justin Bieber	Artist of the Year	Nominated	
2023	"Ghost"	Song of the Year	Nominated	
2023	Beliebers	Best Fan Army	Nominated	
2026	"Daisies"	Best Lyrics	Nominated	

=== iHeartRadio Titanium Award ===
Year	Nominee / work	Award	Result	Ref.
2020	"I Don't Care" (with Ed Sheeran)	Winning Songs	Won	
2022	"Stay" (with The Kid Laroi)	Winning Songs	Won	
2023	"Ghost"	Winning Songs	Won	

== International Dance Music Awards ==
The International Dance Music Awards are held annually as part of the Winter Music Conference. Bieber won an award out of four nominations.

Year	Nominee / work	Award	Result	Ref.
2016	"Where Are Ü Now" (with Jack Ü)	Best Dubstep/Drum & Bass Track	Won	
2016	"Where Are Ü Now" (with Jack Ü)	Best Commercial/Pop Dance Track	Nominated	
2016	"Where Are Ü Now" (with Jack Ü)	Best Featured Vocalist Performance - Title, Vocalist/Artist	Nominated	
2016	"Where Are Ü Now" (with Jack Ü)	Best Music Video	Nominated	

== JIM Awards ==
The JIM Awards are an annual awards show presented by the Flemish TV channel JIM. Bieber has won an award out of three nominations.

Year	Nominee / work	Award	Result	Ref.
2013	Justin Bieber	Best Singer	Won	
2013	Justin Bieber	Best Pop	Nominated	
2013	Justin Bieber	Blooper of the Year	Nominated	

== Joox Awards ==
=== Joox Thailand Music Awards ===
The Joox Thailand Music Awards (abbreviated as JTMA) is an annual music awards presented by Joox music streaming application.

Year	Nominee / work	Award	Result	Ref.
2017	Justin Bieber	International Artist of the Year	Nominated	
2019	Justin Bieber	International Artist of the Year	Won	

=== Joox Top Music Awards Malaysia ===
Year	Nominee / work	Award	Result	Ref.
2020	Justin Bieber	International Artist of the Year (Year End)	Won	
2020	Justin Bieber	Top 5 International Artist of the Year	Won	
2020	"Stuck with U" (with Ariana Grande)	International Hit of the Year	Won	
2020	"Yummy"	Top 5 International Hit of the Year	Won	
2020	"Lonely" (with Benny Blanco)	Top 5 International Hit of the Year (Year End)	Won	

=== Joox Top Music Awards Malaysia (Mid Year) ===
Year	Nominee / work	Award	Result	Ref.
2021	Justin Bieber	Top 5 International Artist of the Year	Won	
2021	"Hold On"	Top 5 International Hit of the Year	Won	

== Juno Awards ==
The Juno Awards, more popularly known as the JUNOS, are presented annually to Canadian musical artists and bands to acknowledge their artistic and technical achievements in all aspects of music. Bieber has won eight awards out of 32 nominations.

Year	Nominee / work	Award	Result	Ref.
2010	My World	Album of the Year	Nominated	
2010	My World	Pop Album of the Year	Nominated	
2010	Justin Bieber	New Artist of the Year	Nominated	
2011	Justin Bieber	Artist of the Year	Nominated	
2011	Justin Bieber	Fan Choice Award	Won	
2011	My World 2.0	Album of the Year	Nominated	
2011	My World 2.0	Pop Album of the Year	Won	
2012	Justin Bieber	Fan Choice Award	Won	
2012	Under the Mistletoe	Album of the Year	Nominated	
2013	Justin Bieber	Artist of the Year	Nominated	
2013	Justin Bieber	Fan Choice Award	Won	
2013	Believe	Album of the Year	Nominated	
2013	Believe	Pop Album of the Year	Nominated	
2014	Justin Bieber	Fan Choice Award	Won	
2016	Justin Bieber	Artist of the Year	Nominated	
2016	Justin Bieber	Fan Choice Award	Won	
2016	Purpose	Album of the Year	Nominated	
2016	Purpose	Pop Album of the Year	Won	
2016	"What Do You Mean?"	Single of the Year	Nominated	
2017	Justin Bieber	Fan Choice Award	Nominated	
2018	Justin Bieber	Fan Choice Award	Nominated	
2020	Justin Bieber	Fan Choice Award	Nominated	
2021	Justin Bieber	Fan Choice Award	Nominated	
2021	Justin Bieber	Artist of the Year	Nominated	
2021	Changes	Album of the Year	Nominated	
2021	Changes	Pop Album of the Year	Won	
2021	"Intentions"	Single of the Year	Nominated	
2022	Justin Bieber	Artist of the Year	Nominated	
2022	Justin Bieber	Fan Choice Award	Nominated	
2022	Justice	Album of the Year	Nominated	
2022	Justice	Pop Album of the Year	Nominated	
2022	"Peaches" (feat. Daniel Caesar and Giveon)	Single of the Year	Nominated	

== Kerrang! Awards ==
The Kerrang! Awards is an annual music awards show in the United Kingdom, founded by Kerrang! music magazine.

Year	Nominee / work	Award	Result	Ref.
2012	Justin Bieber	Villain of the Year	Won	

== Latin American Music Awards ==
The Latin American Music Awards (Latin AMAs) is an annual American music award to be presented by Telemundo. Bieber has won two awards out of seven nominations.

Year	Nominee / work	Award	Result
2015	"Where Are Ü Now" (with Jack Ü)	Favorite Dance Song	Nominated
2016	Justin Bieber	Favorite Crossover Artist	Won
2016	"Love Yourself"	Favorite Crossover Song	Won
2017	"Despacito" (with Luis Fonsi & Daddy Yankee)	Song of the Year	Nominated
2017	"Despacito" (with Luis Fonsi & Daddy Yankee)	Favorite Pop/Rock Song	Nominated
2017	"Despacito" (with Luis Fonsi & Daddy Yankee)	Favorite Collaboration	Nominated
2017	Justin Bieber	Favorite Crossover Artist	Nominated

== Latin Grammy Awards ==
The Latin Grammy is an award by The Latin Recording Academy to recognize outstanding achievement in the Latin music industry. The Latin Grammy honors works produced anywhere around the world that were recorded in either Spanish or Portuguese and is awarded in the United States.

Year	Nominee / work	Award	Result	Ref.
2017	"Despacito (Remix)" (with Luis Fonsi and Daddy Yankee)	Best Urban Fusion/Performance	Won	

== LOS40 Music Awards ==
The LOS40 Music Awards, formerly known as Premios 40 Principales, are annual awards organized by Spanish music radio Los 40. Bieber has received three awards from nine nominations.

Year	Nominee / work	Award	Result	Ref.
2016	Justin Bieber	International Act of the Year	Nominated	
2016	Purpose	International Album of the Year	Won	
2016	"Sorry"	International Song of the Year	Nominated	
2016	Justin Bieber	LO + 40 Artist Award	Nominated	
2017	"Despacito" (with Luis Fonsi & Daddy Yankee)	International Song of the Year	Won	
2017	"Despacito" (with Luis Fonsi & Daddy Yankee)	Golden Music Award	Won	
2019	"I Don't Care" (with Ed Sheeran)	International Song of the Year	Nominated	
2021	Justin Bieber	Best International Live Act	Nominated	
2021	Justice	International Album of the Year	Nominated	

== Lunas del Auditorio ==
The Lunas del Auditorio are sponsored by The National Auditorium in Mexico to honor the best live shows in the country. Bieber has received three nominations.

Year	Nominee / work	Award	Result	Ref.
2012	Justin Bieber	Pop in Foreign Language	Nominated	
2014	Justin Bieber	Pop in Foreign Language	Nominated	
2017	Justin Bieber	Pop in Foreign Language	Nominated	

== Melon Music Awards ==
The Melon Music Awards is a major music awards show that is held annually in South Korea. It is known for only calculating digital sales and online votes to judge winners. Bieber has won an award out of three nominations.

Year	Nominee / work	Award	Result	Ref.
2016	"Love Yourself"	Best Pop Song	Won	
2019	"I Don't Care" (with Ed Sheeran)	Best Pop Song	Nominated	
2020	"Stuck with U" (with Ariana Grande)	Best Pop Song	Nominated	

== Melty Future Awards ==
The Melty Future Awards are annual awards presented by French infotainment site and online media company Melty.

Year	Nominee / work	Award	Result	Ref.
2016	Beliebers	L'Ultime Fanbase	Won	

== Movieguide Awards ==
The Movieguide Awards is an annual award ceremony for Christian and family-friendly entertainment held every year in Hollywood.

Year	Nominee / work	Award	Result	Ref.
2011	Justin Bieber: Never Say Never – MTV/Paramount	Epiphany Prize Most Inspiring Movie	Nominated	
2011	Justin Bieber: Never Say Never – MTV/Paramount	The Ten Best 2011 Movies for Families	Nominated	
2011	Justin Bieber: Never Say Never	Grace Award Most Inspiring Performance	Nominated	

== MP3 Music Awards ==
The MP3 Music Awards is an annual music awards show in the United Kingdom, and chosen by worldwide public votes using MMA's Judging Jukebox Player.

Year	Nominee / work	Award	Result	Ref.
2013	"#thatPOWER" (with will.i.am)	The MIC Award (Music / Industry / Choice)	Nominated	

== MTV Awards ==
=== MTV Europe Music Awards ===
The MTV Europe Music Awards (commonly abbreviated as MTV EMA) are awards presented by Viacom International Media Networks to honour artists and music in pop culture. They have been held annually by MTV Europe since 1994. Bieber has won a record 22 awards from 52 nominations.

Year	Nominee / work	Award	Result	Ref.
2010	Justin Bieber	Best New Act	Nominated	
2010	Justin Bieber	Best Male	Won	
2010	Justin Bieber	Best Push Act	Won	
2011	Justin Bieber	Best Male	Won	
2011	Justin Bieber	Best Pop	Won	
2011	Justin Bieber	MTV Voice Award	Won	
2011	Justin Bieber	Biggest Fans	Nominated	
2011	Justin Bieber	Best North American Act	Nominated	
2012	Justin Bieber	Best Male	Won	
2012	Justin Bieber	Best Pop	Won	
2012	Justin Bieber	Best North American Act	Nominated	
2012	Justin Bieber	Biggest Fans	Nominated	
2012	Justin Bieber	Best World Stage Performance	Won	
2013	Justin Bieber	Best Male	Won	
2013	Justin Bieber	Best Canadian Act	Won	
2013	Justin Bieber	Best North American Act	Won	
2013	Justin Bieber	Best Worldwide Act	Nominated	
2013	Justin Bieber	Best Pop	Nominated	
2013	Justin Bieber	Biggest Fans	Nominated	
2014	Justin Bieber	Best Male	Won	
2014	Justin Bieber	Best Canadian Act	Won	
2014	Justin Bieber	Best North American Act	Nominated	
2014	Justin Bieber	Biggest Fans	Nominated	
2015	Justin Bieber	Best Pop	Nominated	
2015	Justin Bieber	Best Male	Won	
2015	Justin Bieber	Biggest Fans	Won	
2015	Justin Bieber	Best Look	Won	
2015	Justin Bieber	Best Canadian Act	Won	
2015	Justin Bieber	Best North American Act	Won	
2015	"Where Are Ü Now" (with Jack Ü)	Best Collaboration	Won	
2016	Justin Bieber	Best Male	Nominated	
2016	Justin Bieber	Best Pop	Nominated	
2016	Justin Bieber	Biggest Fans	Won	
2016	Justin Bieber	Best Canadian Act	Won	
2016	"Sorry"	Best Song	Won	
2017	"Despacito" (with Luis Fonsi & Daddy Yankee)	Best Song	Nominated	
2017	Justin Bieber	Biggest Fans	Nominated	
2017	Justin Bieber	Best Canadian Act	Nominated	
2020	"Intentions" (featuring Quavo)	Best Collaboration	Nominated	
2020	Justin Bieber	Biggest Fans	Nominated	
2020	Justin Bieber	Best Canadian Act	Nominated	
2020	Justin Bieber	Best Artist	Nominated	
2020	Justin Bieber	Best Pop	Nominated	
2021	Justin Bieber	Best Artist	Nominated	
2021	Justin Bieber	Best Pop	Nominated	
2021	Justin Bieber	Best Canadian Act	Nominated	
2021	Justin Bieber	Biggest Fans	Nominated	
2021	"Stay" (featuring The Kid Laroi)	Best Collaboration	Nominated	
2021	"Stay" (featuring The Kid Laroi)	Best Song	Nominated	
2021	"Peaches" (featuring Daniel Caesar & Giveon)	Best Song	Nominated	
2021	"Peaches" (featuring Daniel Caesar & Giveon)	Best Video	Nominated	
2022	"Wave Presents: Justin Bieber: An Interactive Virtual Experience"	Best Metaverse Performance	Nominated	

=== MTV Italian Music Awards ===
The MTV Italian Music Awards (formerly known as TRL Awards) were established in 2006 by MTV Italy to celebrate the most popular artists and music videos in Italy. Bieber won nine awards out of 17 nominations.

Year	Nominee / work	Award	Result	Ref.
2010	Justin Bieber	Best International Act	Won	
2012	Justin Bieber	Best Look	Won	
2013	Justin Bieber	Best Fan	Nominated	
2013	Justin Bieber	Artist Saga	Nominated	
2013	Justin Bieber	Best Tweet	Won	
2013	"#thatPOWER" (with will.i.am)	Best Energic Video	Won	
2014	Justin Bieber	Best Fan	Nominated	
2014	Justin Bieber	Artist Saga	Nominated	
2015	Justin Bieber	Best Fan	Nominated	
2015	Justin Bieber	Artist Saga	Nominated	
2015	Justin Bieber	Top Instagram Star	Won	
2016	Justin Bieber	Best International Male	Won	
2016	Justin Bieber	Best Tormentone	Won	
2016	"What Do You Mean?"	AIR VIGORSOL Best Fresh Video	Won	
2016	Justin Bieber	Artist Saga	Nominated	
2017	Justin Bieber	Best International Male	Won	
2017	Justin Bieber	Best Fan	Nominated	

=== MTV Millennial Awards ===
The MTV Millennial Awards (commonly abbreviated as a MIAW) is an awards show created by MTV Latin America that reward the best of the Millennial generation as well as rewarding music and movies also rewards the best of the digital world. Bieber has received an award out of 12 nominations.

Year	Nominee / work	Award	Result	Ref.
2013	Justin Bieber	Biggest Instagram Star	Nominated	
2014	Justin Bieber	Global Instagram Star	Nominated	
2016	Justin Bieber	Global Snapchatter of the Year	Nominated	
2016	Justin Bieber	Fail of the Year	Nominated	
2016	"Sorry"	International Hit of the Year	Nominated	
2016	"Where Are Ü Now" (with Jack Ü)	Collaboration of the Year	Nominated	
2017	Justin Bieber	Ridiculous of the Year	Won	
2017	"Cold Water" (with Major Lazer and MØ)	Collaboration of the Year	Nominated	
2017	"Despacito" (with Luis Fonsi & Daddy Yankee)	Collaboration of the Year	Nominated	
2017	"Let Me Love You" (with DJ Snake)	International Hit of the Year	Nominated	
2018	Justin Bieber	Ridiculous of the Year	Nominated	
2021	"Peaches" (featuring Daniel Caesar & Giveon)	Global Hit of the Year	Nominated	

=== MTV Millennial Awards Brazil ===
Year	Nominee / work	Award	Result	Ref.
2018	Justin Bieber	Fandom of the Year	Nominated	
2020	"Stuck with U" (with Ariana Grande)	International Collaboration	Nominated	
2021	"Monster" (with Shawn Mendes)	International Collaboration	Won	
2021	Justin Bieber	Fandom of the Year	Nominated	
2021	"Peaches" (featuring Daniel Caesar & Giveon)	Global Hit	Nominated	

=== MTV Movie & TV Awards ===
The MTV Movie & TV Awards are a film awards show presented annually on MTV.

Year	Nominee / work	Award	Result	Ref.
2011	Justin Bieber: Never Say Never	Best Jaw Dropping Moment	Won	

=== MTV Video Music Awards ===
The MTV Video Music Awards (VMAs) is an award show by the cable network MTV to honor the top music videos of the year. Bieber has won six awards out of 38 nominations.

Year	Nominee / work	Award	Result	Ref.
2010	"Baby" (with Ludacris)	Best New Artist	Won	
2011	"U Smile"	Best Male Video	Won	
2012	"Boyfriend"	Best Male Video	Nominated	
2012	"Boyfriend"	Best Pop Video	Nominated	
2012	"Boyfriend"	Most Share-Worthy Video	Nominated	
2013	"#thatPower" (with will.i.am)	Best Choreography	Nominated	
2015	"Where Are Ü Now" (with Jack Ü)	Best Art Direction	Nominated	
2015	"Where Are Ü Now" (with Jack Ü)	Best Editing	Nominated	
2015	"Where Are Ü Now" (with Jack Ü)	Best Visual Effects	Won	
2015	"Where Are Ü Now" (with Jack Ü)	Song of Summer	Nominated	
2016	"Sorry"	Video of the Year	Nominated	
2016	"Sorry"	Best Pop Video	Nominated	
2016	Purpose: The Movement	Best Breakthrough Long Form Video	Nominated	
2016	"Cold Water" (with Major Lazer and MØ)	Best Dance	Nominated	
2016	"Cold Water" (with Major Lazer and MØ)	Song of Summer	Nominated	
2017	"Despacito" (with Luis Fonsi and Daddy Yankee)	Song of Summer	Nominated	
2017	"I'm the One" (with DJ Khaled, Quavo, Chance the Rapper and Lil Wayne)	Best Hip Hop Video	Nominated	
2018	"No Brainer" (with DJ Khaled, Quavo, and Chance the Rapper)	Song of Summer	Nominated	
2019	"I Don't Care" (with Ed Sheeran)	Song of Summer	Nominated	
2019	"I Don't Care" (with Ed Sheeran)	Best Collaboration	Nominated	
2020	Justin Bieber	Artist of the Year	Nominated	
2020	"Stuck with U" (with Ariana Grande)	Best Collaboration	Nominated	
2020	"Stuck with U" (with Ariana Grande)	Best Music Video From Home	Won	
2020	"Intentions" (featuring Quavo)	Best Pop	Nominated	
2021	Justin Bieber	Artist of the Year	Won	
2021	"Popstar" (starring Justin Bieber) - DJ Khaled (featuring Drake)	Video of the Year	Nominated	
2021	"Popstar" (starring Justin Bieber) - DJ Khaled (featuring Drake)	Best Direction	Nominated	
2021	"Holy" (featuring Chance the Rapper)	Best Cinematography	Nominated	
2021	"Peaches" (featuring Daniel Caesar and Giveon)	Best Collaboration	Nominated	
2021	"Peaches" (featuring Daniel Caesar and Giveon)	Best Pop	Won	
2021	"Peaches" (featuring Daniel Caesar and Giveon)	Best Editing	Nominated	
2021	"Peaches" (featuring Daniel Caesar and Giveon)	Song of Summer	Nominated	
2021	"Stay" (with The Kid Laroi)	Song of Summer	Nominated	
2022	"Stay" (with The Kid Laroi)	Song of the Year	Nominated	
2022	"Stay" (with The Kid Laroi)	Best Collaboration	Nominated	
2022	"Stay" (with The Kid Laroi)	Best Visual Effects	Nominated	
2022	Justin Bieber – An Interactive Virtual Experience (Wave)	Best Metaverse Performance	Nominated	
2025	Justin Bieber	Best Pop Artist	Nominated	

=== MTV Video Music Awards Japan ===
The MTV Video Music Awards Japan (MTV VMAJ) are the Japanese version of the MTV Video Music Awards. Like the MTV Video Music Awards in the United States, in this event artists are awarded for their songs and videos through online voting from the same channel viewers. Bieber has won two awards out of nine nominations.

Year	Nominee / work	Award	Result	Ref.
2011	"Baby" (featuring Ludacris)	Best New Artist Video	Won	
2011	"Never Say Never" (featuring Jaden Smith)	Best Video from a Film	Nominated	
2011	"Baby" (featuring Ludacris)	Best Karaokee! Song	Nominated	
2012	"Mistletoe"	Best Male Video	Nominated	
2013	"Beauty and a Beat" (featuring Nicki Minaj)	Best Male Video	Nominated	
2013	"Beauty and a Beat" (featuring Nicki Minaj)	Best Pop Video	Nominated	
2016	"Sorry"	Best International Male Video	Won	
2016	"Sorry"	Best Choreography	Nominated	
2016	"What Do You Mean?"	Best Pop Video	Nominated	
2016	Purpose	International Album of the Year	Nominated	

=== MTV Video Music Brazil ===
The MTV Video Music Brazil (VMB) were held annually by MTV Brasil until 2012. Bieber has won an award out of two nominations.

Year	Nominee / work	Award	Result	Ref.
2010	Justin Bieber	International Artist	Won	
2012	Justin Bieber	International Artist	Nominated	

=== MTV Video Play Awards ===
The MTV Video Play Awards is an annual event that celebrates the highest video play counts on MTV channels across the globe. Bieber has won five awards.

Year	Nominee / work	Award	Result	Ref.
2016	"Love Yourself"	Winning Videos	Won	
2016	"Sorry"	Winning Videos	Won	
2019	"I Don't Care" (with Ed Sheeran)	Winning Videos	Won	
2021	"Peaches" (feat. Daniel Caesar and Giveon)	Winning Videos	Won	
2021	"Stay" (with The Kid Laroi)	Winning Videos	Won	

== Myx Music Awards ==
The Myx Music Awards is an annual awards show that honors the biggest hitmakers in the Philippines. Bieber has received five nominations.

Year	Nominee / work	Award	Result	Ref.
2010	"One Time"	Favorite International Video	Nominated	
2011	"Baby" (feat. Ludacris)	Favorite International Video	Nominated	
2013	"Boyfriend"	Favorite International Video	Nominated	
2016	"Where Are Ü Now" (with Jack Ü)	Favorite International Video	Nominated	
2021	"Yummy"	Favorite International Video	Nominated	

== NAACP Image Awards ==
The NAACP Image Awards is an annual awards ceremony presented by the U.S.-based National Association for the Advancement of Colored People (NAACP) to honor outstanding performances in film, television, theatre, music, and literature.

Year	Nominee / work	Award	Result	Ref.
2022	"Essence (Remix)" (with Wizkid and Tems)	Outstanding International Song	Won	

== NBA All-Star Celebrity Game ==
The NBA All-Star Celebrity Game is an annual exhibition basketball game held by the National Basketball Association that takes place during the NBA All-Star Weekend and features retired NBA players, WNBA players, actors, musicians and athletes from sports other than basketball.

Year	Nominee / work	Award	Result	Ref.
2011	Justin Bieber	Most Valuable Player	Won	

== NewNowNext Awards ==
The NewNowNext Awards is an American annual entertainment awards show, presented by the lesbian, gay, bisexual and transgender-themed channel Logo.

Year	Nominee / work	Award	Result	Ref.
2013	Justin Bieber	Best New Do	Nominated	

== New Music Awards ==
The New Music Awards are honors given annually in music to both recording artists and radio stations by New Music Weekly magazine. Bieber has won five awards.

Year	Nominee / work	Award	Result	Ref.
2020	"10,000 Hours" (with Dan + Shay)	Country Song of the Year	Won	
2021	Justin Bieber and Benny Blanco	AC Group of the Year	Won	
2021	Justin Bieber	TOP40/CHR Male Artist of the Year	Won	
2022	Justin Bieber	TOP40/CHR Male Artist of the Year	Won	
2023	"Stay" (with The Kid Laroi)	Adult Contemporary Song of the Year	Won	

== Nickelodeon Awards ==
=== Meus Prêmios Nick ===
Year	Nominee / work	Award	Result
2010	Justin Bieber	Favorite International Artist	Won
2011	Justin Bieber	Favorite International Artist	Nominated
2012	Justin Bieber	Favorite International Artist	Nominated
2013	Justin Bieber	Favorite International Artist	Nominated
2014	Beliebers	Favorite Fans	Won
2016	Justin Bieber	Favorite International Artist	Nominated
2017	Justin Bieber	Favorite International Artist	Nominated
2017	Justin Bieber	Favorite International Instagrammer	Nominated
2017	Purpose World Tour	International Show of the Year in Brazil	Nominated

=== Nickelodeon Argentina Kids' Choice Awards ===
Year	Nominee / work	Award	Result
2011	Justin Bieber	Favorite International Artist	Nominated
2011	"Baby" (feat. Ludacris)	Favorite Song	Nominated
2012	Justin Bieber	Favorite International Artist or Group	Nominated
2013	"Beauty and a Beat" (feat. Nicki Minaj)	Favorite International Song	Nominated
2016	Justin Bieber	Favorite International Artist	Nominated
2017	Justin Bieber	Favorite International Artist	Nominated
2017	"Despacito" (with Luis Fonsi & Daddy Yankee)	Favorite Collaboration	Nominated

=== Nickelodeon Australian Kids' Choice Awards ===
Year	Nominee / work	Award	Result	Ref.
2010	Justin Bieber	Hottest Hottie	Nominated	
2011	Justin Bieber	Hottest Guy Hottie	Won	

=== Nickelodeon Colombia Kids' Choice Awards ===
Year	Nominee / work	Award	Result	Ref.
2017	Justin Bieber	Favorite International Artist or Group	Nominated	
2017	"Despacito" (with Luis Fonsi & Daddy Yankee)	Favorite Collaboration	Nominated	

=== Nickelodeon HALO Awards ===
Year	Nominee / work	Award	Result
2015	Justin Bieber	Halo Hall of Fame	Won

=== Nickelodeon Kids' Choice Awards ===
The Nickelodeon Kids' Choice Awards (also known as the KCAs) is an annual awards show that honors the year's biggest television, movie, and music acts as voted by Nickelodeon viewers. Bieber has won nine awards out of 24 nominations.

Year	Nominee / work	Award	Result	Ref.
2011	"Baby" (feat. Ludacris)	Favorite Song	Won	
2011	Justin Bieber	Favorite Male Singer	Won	
2012	Justin Bieber	Favorite Male Singer	Won	
2013	Justin Bieber	Favorite Male Singer	Won	
2016	Justin Bieber	Favorite Male Singer	Won	
2016	"What Do You Mean?"	Favorite Song of the Year	Nominated	
2016	"Where Are Ü Now" (with Jack Ü)	Favorite Collaboration	Nominated	
2017	Justin Bieber	Favorite Male Singer	Nominated	
2018	"Despacito" (with Luis Fonsi & Daddy Yankee)	Favorite Song	Nominated	
2018	"I'm the One" (with DJ Khaled, Chance the Rapper, Quavo & Lil Wayne)	Favorite Song	Nominated	
2019	"No Brainer" (with DJ Khaled, Chance the Rapper & Quavo)	Favorite Music Collaboration	Won	
2020	"I Don't Care" (with Ed Sheeran)	Favorite Music Collaboration	Nominated	
2020	"10,000 Hours" (with Dan + Shay)	Favorite Music Collaboration	Nominated	
2020	Justin Bieber	Favorite Male Artist	Nominated	
2021	Justin Bieber	Favorite Male Artist	Won	
2021	"Yummy"	Favorite Song	Nominated	
2021	"Holy" (feat. Chance the Rapper)	Favorite Music Collaboration	Nominated	
2021	"Lonely" (with Benny Blanco)	Favorite Music Collaboration	Nominated	
2021	"Stuck with U" (with Ariana Grande)	Favorite Music Collaboration	Won	
2022	Justin Bieber	Favorite Male Artist	Nominated	
2022	Justice	Favorite Album	Nominated	
2022	"Stay" (with The Kid Laroi)	Favourite Music Collaboration	Won	
2023	Justin Bieber	Favorite Male Artist	Nominated	
2023	Piggy Lou Bieber	Favorite Celebrity Pet	Nominated	

=== Nickelodeon Mexico Kids' Choice Awards ===
Year	Nominee / work	Award	Result	Ref.
2010	"Baby" (feat. Ludacris)	Favorite Song	Won	
2011	"Never Say Never" (feat. Jaden Smith)	Favorite Song	Nominated	
2011	Justin Bieber	Favorite International Artist or Group	Nominated	
2011	Justin Bieber: Never Say Never	Favorite Movie	Won	
2012	"Boyfriend"	Favorite Song	Nominated	
2012	Justin Bieber	Favorite International Artist or Group	Nominated	
2013	Justin Bieber	Favorite International Artist or Group	Nominated	
2013	"Beauty and a Beat" (feat. Nicki Minaj)	Favorite Song	Nominated	
2014	Beliebers	Favorite Fans Club	Nominated	
2017	Beliebers	Best Fandom	Nominated	
2017	Justin Bieber	Favorite International Artist or Group	Nominated	

== NME Awards ==
The NME Awards is an annual music awards show in the United Kingdom, founded by the music magazine, NME (New Musical Express). Bieber has won four awards out of seven nominations.

Year	Nominee / work	Award	Result	Ref.
2011	My World 2.0	Worst Album	Won	
2011	Justin Bieber	Least Stylish	Won	
2011	Justin Bieber	Villain of the Year	Nominated	
2012	Justin Bieber	Villain of the Year	Won	
2012	Under the Mistletoe	Worst Album	Won	
2013	Justin Bieber	Worst Band	Nominated	
2022	"Stay (with The Kid Laroi	Best Song in the World	Nominated	

== NRJ Music Awards ==
The NRJ Music Awards, (commonly abbreviated as an NMA) is an award presented by the French radio station NRJ to honour the best in home and worldwide music industry. Bieber has won six awards from 13 nominations.

Year	Nominee / work	Award	Result
2011	Justin Bieber	International Breakthrough of the Year	Won
2012	Justin Bieber	NRJ Award of Honor	Won
2013	"Beauty and a Beat" (feat. Nicki Minaj)	Music Video of the Year	Nominated
2015	Justin Bieber	NRJ Award of Honor	Won
2016	Justin Bieber	International Male Artist of the Year	Won
2016	"Love Yourself"	International Song of the Year	Won
2017	Justin Bieber	International Male Artist of the Year	Nominated
2017	"Despacito" (with Luis Fonsi and Daddy Yankee)	International Song of the Year	Won
2021	Justin Bieber	International Male Artist of the Year	Nominated
2021	"Peaches" (feat. Daniel Caesar and Giveon)	International Song of the Year	Nominated
2021	"Stay" (with The Kid Laroi)	International Song of the Year	Nominated
2021	"Stay" (with The Kid Laroi)	International Collaboration of the Year	Nominated
2021	"Stay" (with The Kid Laroi)	Video of the Year	Nominated

== Official Charts ==
The Official Charts Company (also known as the Official Charts), is a British inter-professional organisation that honors artists in achieving the pinnacle of UK Singles Chart success.

Year	Nominee / work	Award	Result	Ref.
2016	Justin Bieber	Official Chart Record Breaker Award	Won	

Note: Bieber was the first recipient of the Official Chart Record Breaker Award in 2016.

== O Music Awards ==
The O Music Awards (commonly abbreviated as the OMAs) is an awards show presented by Viacom to honor music, technology and intersection between the two. Bieber has received six nominations.

Year	Nominee / work	Award	Result	Ref.
2011	Beliebers	Fan Army FTW	Nominated	
2011	Justin Bieber	Best Artist with a Cameraphone	Nominated	
2011	Justin Bieber	Best Fan Forum	Nominated	
2011	Justin Bieber	Best Animated GIF	Nominated	
2012	Justin Bieber	Best Artist with a Cameraphone	Nominated	
2013	Beliebers	Fan Army FTW	Nominated	

== People's Choice Awards ==
The People's Choice Awards (PCAs) is an awards show recognizing the people and the work of popular culture. Bieber has won three awards out of 29 nominations.

Year	Nominee / work	Award	Result	Ref.
2011	Justin Bieber	Favorite Breakout Artist	Nominated	
2011	"Baby" (feat. Ludacris)	Favorite Music Video	Nominated	
2012	Justin Bieber	Favorite Male Artist	Nominated	
2013	Believe	Favorite Album of the Year	Nominated	
2013	"Boyfriend"	Favorite Music Video	Nominated	
2013	"Beliebers"	Favorite Fan Following	Nominated	
2013	Justin Bieber	Favorite Male Artist	Nominated	
2013	Justin Bieber	Favorite Pop Artist	Nominated	
2016	Justin Bieber	Favorite Male Artist	Nominated	
2016	"What Do You Mean?"	Favorite Song	Won	
2019
2019	Justin Bieber	The Social Celebrity of 2019	Nominated	
2019	"I Don't Care" (with Ed Sheeran)	The Song of 2019	Nominated	
2020
2020	Justin Bieber	The Male Artist of 2020	Won	
2020	Justin Bieber	The Social Celebrity of 2020	Nominated	
2020	"Intentions" (feat. Quavo)	The Song of 2020	Nominated	
2020	"Stuck with U" (with Ariana Grande)	The Song of 2020	Nominated	
2020	Changes	The Album of 2020	Nominated	
2020	"Holy" (feat. Chance the Rapper)	The Music Video of 2020	Nominated	
2020	"Holy" (feat. Chance the Rapper)	The Collaboration Song of 2020	Nominated	
2021
2021	Justin Bieber	The Male Artist of 2021	Nominated	
2021	Justin Bieber	The Social Celebrity of 2021	Nominated	
2021	"Stay" (with The Kid Laroi)	The Song of 2021	Nominated	
2021	"Stay" (with The Kid Laroi)	The Music Video of 2021	Nominated	
2021	"Stay" (with The Kid Laroi)	The Collaboration Song of 2021	Won	
2021	"Peaches" (feat. Daniel Caesar and Giveon)	The Song of 2021	Nominated	
2021	"Peaches" (feat. Daniel Caesar and Giveon)	The Music Video of 2021	Nominated	
2021	"Peaches" (feat. Daniel Caesar and Giveon)	The Collaboration Song of 2021	Nominated	
2021	Justice	The Album of 2021	Nominated	
2021	Justin Bieber: Our World	The Pop Special of 2021	Nominated	

== PETA Libby Awards ==
Year	Nominee / work	Award	Result	Ref.
2011	Justin Bieber	Most Animal-Friendly Pop/Hip-Hop Artist	Nominated	

== Pollstar Awards ==
The Pollstar Awards is an annual award ceremony to honor artists and professionals in the concert industry. Bieber has received six nominations.

Year	Nominee / work	Award	Result	Ref.
2011	Justin Bieber	Best New Touring Artist	Nominated	
2013	Justin Bieber	Most Creative Stage Production	Nominated	
2014	Justin Bieber	Most Creative Stage Production	Nominated	
2017	Justin Bieber	Pop Tour of the Year	Nominated	
2021	Justin Bieber	Pollstar Touring Artist of the Decade	Nominated	
2021	Justin Bieber	Pop Touring Artist of the Decade	Nominated	

== Premios Juventud ==
The Premios Juventud (Youth Awards) is an awards show for Spanish-speaking celebrities in the areas of film, music, sports, fashion, and pop culture.

Year	Nominee / work	Award	Result	Ref.
2013	Justin Bieber	Favorite Hit Maker	Nominated	
2016	Justin Bieber	Favorite Hit Maker	Nominated	
2016	"Love Yourself"	Favorite Hit	Nominated	
2016	"Sorry"	Favorite Hit	Nominated	

== Premios Oye! ==
The Premios Oye! (Premio Nacional a la Música Grabada) were presented annually by the Academia Nacional de la Música en México for outstanding achievements in the Mexican record industry.

Year	Nominee / work	Award	Result	Ref.
2010	My World	Revelación del año	Won	

== Radio Disney Music Awards ==
The Radio Disney Music Awards (RDMA) is an annual awards show which is operated and governed by Radio Disney, an American radio network. Bieber has won six awards out of 16 nominations.

Year	Nominee / work	Award	Result
2013	"Beauty and a Beat" (feat. Nicki Minaj)	Song Of The Year	Nominated
2013	Beliebers	Fiercest Fans	Nominated
2013	Justin Bieber	Best Male Artist	Won
2016	Justin Bieber	Best Male Artist	Nominated
2016	Justin Bieber	Talked About Artist	Nominated
2016	Beliebers	Fiercest Fans	Won
2016	"What Do You Mean?"	Best Song To Lip Sync To	Won
2016	"Sorry"	Best Breakup Song	Nominated
2017	"Sorry"	Best Breakup Song	Nominated
2017	Justin Bieber	Best Male Artist	Nominated
2017	"Cold Water" (with Major Lazer and MØ)	Best Song To Dance to	Won
2017	"Cold Water" (with Major Lazer and MØ)	Best Dance Track	Won
2017	"Let Me Love You" (with DJ Snake)	Best Crush Song	Won
2017	Beliebers	Fiercest Fans	Nominated
2017	Purpose World Tour	Favorite Tour	Nominated
2018	"Friends" (with BloodPop)	Best Dance Track	Nominated

== Rockbjörnen ==
The Rockbjörnen is a music prize in Sweden, divided into several categories, which is awarded annually by the newspaper Aftonbladet. The prize was first awarded in 1979, and is mostly centered on pop and rock. Bieber has received three nominations.

Year	Nominee / work	Award	Result	Ref.
2010	"Baby" (feat. Ludacris)	Foreign Song of the Year	Nominated	
2012	"Boyfriend"	Foreign Song of the Year	Nominated	
2016	"Love Yourself"	Foreign Song of the Year	Nominated	

== Shorty Awards ==
The Shorty Awards, also known as the Shorties, are an annual awards event that honors the best short-form content creators on the micro-blogging website Twitter and on other social media sites. Bieber has received three awards out of 15 nominations.

Year	Nominee / work	Award	Result	Ref.
2012	Justin Bieber	Best Celebrity	Won	
2012	Justin Bieber	Best in Music	Won	
2012	Justin Bieber	Best Singer	Nominated	
2013	Justin Bieber	Best Celebrity	Won	
2013	Justin Bieber	Best in Music	Nominated	
2013	Justin Bieber	Best Singer	Nominated	
2014	Justin Bieber	Best Celebrity	Nominated	
2014	Justin Bieber	Best in Music	Nominated	
2014	Justin Bieber	Best Singer	Nominated	
2014	Justin Bieber	Instagrammer of the Year	Nominated	
2014	Justin Bieber	Best YouTube Star	Nominated	
2014	Justin Bieber's first Instagram video	A&E's Instagram Video of the Year	Nominated	
2014	Justin Bieber's siblings	A&E's Instagram Video of the Year	Nominated	
2014	Recovery is now on iTunes get it now!	A&E's Instagram Video of the Year	Nominated	
2015	Justin Bieber	Best Celebrity	Nominated	

== Social Star Awards ==
The Social Star Awards is an annual awards show that honors the year's biggest achievements held in Singapore.

Year	Nominee / work	Award	Result	Ref.
2013	Justin Bieber	Music Solo Artist	Won	
2013	Justin Bieber	Almighty Award	Won	

== Soul Train Awards ==
The Soul Train Music Awards is an annual music awards show that honors the best in African American culture, R&B, Soul, Hiphop, Jazz and gospel music.

Year	Nominee/Work	Award	Result
2026	Ýukon	R&B/Soul Song of The Year	Pending

== Streamy Awards ==
The Streamy Awards, also known as the YouTube Streamy Awards, are presented annually to recognize and honor excellence in online video, including directing, acting, producing, and writing.

Year	Nominee / work	Award	Result
2020	Justin Bieber (with David Dobrik)	Collaboration	Won
2020	Justin Bieber: Seasons	Documentary	Nominated

== Teen Choice Awards ==
The Teen Choice Awards is an annual awards show that honors the year's biggest achievements in music, movies, sports, television, fashion, and more. Bieber has won 23 out of 56 nominations.

Year	Nominee / work	Award	Result	Ref.
2010	Justin Bieber	Choice Fanatic Fans	Nominated	
2010	Justin Bieber	Choice Music: Male Artist	Won	
2010	Justin Bieber	Choice Music: Breakout Artist Male	Won	
2010	Justin Bieber	Choice Summer Music Star: Male	Won	
2010	My World 2.0	Choice Music: Pop Album	Won	
2011	Justin Bieber	Choice Male Hottie	Won	
2011	Justin Bieber	Choice Music: Male Artist	Won	
2011	Justin Bieber	Choice Red Carpet Fashion Icon: Male	Nominated	
2011	Justin Bieber	Choice TV: Villain	Won	
2011	Justin Bieber	Choice Twit	Won	
2012	Justin Bieber	Choice Music: Male Artist	Won	
2012	Justin Bieber	Choice Male Hottie	Nominated	
2012	Justin Bieber	Choice Red Carpet Fashion Icon: Male	Won	
2012	Justin Bieber	Choice Twit	Nominated	
2012	Justin Bieber	Choice Summer Music Star Male	Won	
2012	"Boyfriend"	Choice Music: Single by a Male Artist	Won	
2012	"All Around The World" (feat. Ludacris)	Choice Music: Summer Song	Nominated	
2012	"Die in Your Arms"	Choice Music: Love Song	Nominated	
2013	Justin Bieber	Choice Music: Male Artist	Won	
2013	Justin Bieber	Choice Male Hottie	Nominated	
2013	Justin Bieber	Choice Twitter Personality	Won	
2013	"Beauty and a Beat" (feat. Nicki Minaj)	Choice Music: Single by a Male Artist	Won	
2014	Justin Bieber	Choice Instagrammer	Nominated	
2014	Justin Bieber	Choice Social Media King	Nominated	
2014	Justin Bieber	Choice Twit	Nominated	
2015	Justin Bieber	Choice Summer Music Star Male	Nominated	
2015	Justin Bieber	Choice Male Hottie	Nominated	
2015	Justin Bieber	Choice Selfie Taker	Nominated	
2015	Justin Bieber	Choice Instagrammer	Nominated	
2015	Justin Bieber	Choice Twit	Nominated	
2015	Justin Bieber	Choice Social Media King	Won	
2015	"Where Are Ü Now" (with Jack Ü)	Choice Song: Male Artist	Nominated	
2015	"Where Are Ü Now" (with Jack Ü)	Choice Music: Break-Up Song	Nominated	
2015	"Where Are Ü Now" (with Jack Ü)	Choice Music: Collaboration	Nominated	
2016	Justin Bieber	Choice Music: Male Artist	Won	
2016	Justin Bieber	Choice Summer Music Star: Male	Nominated	
2016	Justin Bieber	Choice Male Hottie	Nominated	
2016	Justin Bieber	Choice Social Media King	Nominated	
2016	Justin Bieber	Choice Twit	Won	
2016	Justin Bieber	Choice Instagrammer	Nominated	
2016	Justin Bieber	Choice Fandom	Nominated	
2016	Justin Bieber	Choice Selfie Taker	Nominated	
2016	"Sorry"	Choice Music Single: Male	Won	
2016	"Love Yourself"	Choice Music: Break-Up Song	Won	
2016	Purpose World Tour	Choice Summer Tour	Nominated	
2017	Justin Bieber	Choice Male Artist	Nominated	
2017	Justin Bieber	Choice Summer Male Artist	Nominated	
2017	Justin Bieber	Choice Instagrammer	Nominated	
2017	Justin Bieber	Choice Male Hottie	Nominated	
2017	"Despacito" (with Luis Fonsi & Daddy Yankee)	Choice Song: Male Artist	Nominated	
2017	"Despacito" (with Luis Fonsi & Daddy Yankee)	Choice Latin Song	Won	
2017	"Despacito" (with Luis Fonsi & Daddy Yankee)	Choice Summer Song	Won	
2017	"2U" (with David Guetta)	Choice Electronic/Dance Song	Nominated	
2017	"I'm the One" (with DJ Khaled, Quavo, Chance the Rapper and Lil Wayne)	Choice R&B/Hip-Hop Song	Won	
2019	"I Don't Care" (with Ed Sheeran)	Choice Music: Collaboration	Nominated	
2019	"I Don't Care" (with Ed Sheeran)	Choice Music: Pop Song	Nominated	

== Telehit Awards ==
The Telehit Awards are annual award show. Bieber has won five awards out of 12 nominations.

Year	Nominee / work	Award	Result
2011	Justin Bieber	Best International Tour	Won
2012	Justin Bieber	Most Popular Artist on Telehit	Nominated
2012	"Boyfriend"	Video of the Year	Won
2013	"Beauty and a Beat" (feat. Nicki Minaj)	Song of the Public	Won
2013	Justin Bieber	Most Popular Artist on Telehit	Won
2015	"What Do You Mean?"	Most Popular Video of the Year	Nominated
2015	"Where Are Ü Now" (with Jack Ü)	Video of the Year	Nominated
2015	Justin Bieber	Most Popular Artist on Telehit	Nominated
2016	"Sorry"	Song of the Year	Won
2017	"I'm the One" (with DJ Khaled, Quavo, Chance the Rapper and Lil Wayne)	Video of the Year	Nominated
2017	Justin Bieber	Telehit Prize to the Artistic Track	Nominated
2019	"I Don't Care" (with Ed Sheeran)	Best Song in English	Nominated

== Tribeca Disruptive Innovation Awards ==
The Tribeca Disruptive Innovation Awards (TDIA) celebrates those whose ideas have broken the mold to create significant impact.

Year	Nominee / work	Award	Result	Ref.
2012	Justin Bieber	Disruptive Innovation Award	Won	

== Variety's Power of Youth Awards ==
The Variety's Power of Youth GenerationOn Award recognizes young stars who have made significant contributions to philanthropic or charitable causes.

Year	Nominee / work	Award	Result	Ref.
2010	Justin Bieber	Variety's Power of Youth Philanthropy Award	Won	

== Virgin Media Music Awards ==
The Virgin Media Music Awards are the annual music awards run by Virgin Media. The winners are declared on its official site "Virgin Media".

Year	Nominee / work	Award	Result	Ref.
2011	Justin Bieber	Hottest Male	Nominated	
2013	Justin Bieber	Best Solo Artist	Won	
2013	Believe	Best Album	Won	

== WDM Radio Awards ==
The WDM Radio Awards are dance and electronic music awards established in 2017 by Los 40 under their World Dance Music brand.

Year	Nominee / work	Award	Result	Ref.
2017	"Cold Water" (with Major Lazer and MØ)	Best Global Track	Nominated	
2018	"2U" (with David Guetta)	Best Bass Track	Nominated	

== Webby Awards ==
A Webby Award is an award for excellence on the Internet presented annually by The International Academy of Digital Arts and Sciences. Categories include websites, interactive advertising, online film and video, and mobile.

Year	Nominee / work	Award	Result	Ref.
2011	Justin Bieber FunnyorDie	People's Voice Best Comedy Video	Won	
2013	Justin Bieber	Social Media Campaigns	Won	
2014	Justin Bieber FunnyorDie "Online Film & Video : Long Form or Series Web"	Comedy	Won	

== Wembley Way Walk of Fame ==
The Wembley Way Walk of Fame honors acts for their defining performances and/or moments at the Wembley Stadium, UK. Inductees are presented with a stone plaque that is laid on the Wembley Way.

Year	Recipient	Award	Result	Ref
2012	Justin Bieber	Wembley Way Walk of Fame	Inducted	

== World Leadership Awards ==
The World Leadership Awards have been prepared by the World Leadership Forum.

Year	Nominee / work	Award	Result	Ref.
2010	Justin Bieber	Global Youth Leadership Award	Won	

== World Music Awards ==
The World Music Awards is an international awards show founded in 1989 that annually honored recording artists based on worldwide sales figures provided by the International Federation of the Phonographic Industry (IFPI).

Year	Nominee / work	Award	Result
2010	Justin Bieber	Best New Artist	Nominated

== Young Hollywood Awards ==
The Young Hollywood Awards is an award show presented annually which honors the year's biggest achievements in music, movies, sports, television, fashion and more.

Year	Nominee / work	Award	Result	Ref.
2010	Justin Bieber	Newcomer of the Year	Won	
2014	Justin Bieber	Champ of Charity Award	Won	

== Youth Rock Awards ==
The Youth Rock Awards is an awards show recognizing the people and the work in entertainment industry.

Year	Nominee / work	Award	Result	Ref.
2011	Justin Bieber	Rockin' Artist of the Year	Won	
2011	"U Smile"	Rockin' Music Video of the Year	Nominated	
2011	"Next to You" (with Chris Brown)	Rockin' Music Video of the Year	Nominated	

== YouTube Music Awards ==
The YouTube Music Awards (commonly abbreviated as YTMA) is an awards show presented by YouTube to honor the best in the music video medium. Bieber has received two nominations.

Year	Nominee / work	Award	Result	Ref.
2013	"Beauty And A Beat" (feat. Nicki Minaj)	Video of the Year	Nominated	
2013	Justin Bieber	Artist of the Year	Nominated	
