= Alex Brummer =

English journalist (born 1949)

- Born: 25 May 1949 (age 77); Brighton, England
- Occupations: Journalist, editor, author
- Notable credit(s): City Editor, Daily Mail

Alex Brummer (born 25 May 1949) is an English economics commentator, working as a journalist, editor, and author. He has been the city editor of the Daily Mail (London) since May 2000, where he writes a daily column on economics and finance. He was the financial editor of The Guardian between 1990 and 1999.

He was previously a regular contributor to The Jewish Chronicle (London), writing on business, the media, the Holocaust, and Middle East policy. He is Chairman of the Jewish News editorial board, where he writes occasional columns. He is also a member of the editorial advisory board of Jewish Renaissance magazine. He was formerly a Vice-President of the Board of Deputies of British Jews and chair of the Board's International Division.

Brummer is a freelance contributor to the New Statesman, The Spectator, Airline Business, and British Journalism Review.

== Career ==
Born in Brighton, he has a degree in economics and politics from the University of Southampton and an MSc in business from Bradford University Management Centre. Brummer began his career with work experience at J. Walter Thompson and as a correspondent at Haymarket Publishing between 1970 and 1972. He then joined The Guardian as the Financial Correspondent. He was the main reporter on the fringe banking crisis of 1973/4 and the 1976 sterling crisis.

In 1979, he became the US financial and Washington correspondent for The Guardian. He covered the 1980, 1984, and 1988 US presidential elections for the newspaper. His work in this area earned him the 1989 Overseas Press Club award for the best foreign correspondent in the US. Brummer then took up positions as a foreign editor and financial editor, and completed his twenty-six-year tenure at The Guardian as associate editor.

He worked as consultant editor for the Financial Mail on Sunday between 1999 and 2000 and was voted Financial Journalist of the Year at the British Press Awards. In 2000, he became the city editor of the Daily Mail. Brummer covered the 2003 Iraq War for the Daily Mail from Washington, D.C., and led the newspaper's coverage on the 2007 run on Northern Rock, collapse of Lehman Brothers, and subsequent credit crunch.

On 4 February 2009, Brummer appeared as a witness at the House of Commons Treasury Select Committee, along with Robert Peston (BBC), Lionel Barber (Financial Times), Simon Jenkins (The Guardian), and Jeff Randall (Sky News) to answer questions on the role of the media in financial stability and "whether financial journalists should operate under any form of reporting restrictions during banking crises".

== Honours ==
In 2014 Brummer was awarded an honorary degree of Doctor of the University by Bradford University.

== Books ==
- James Hanson: a Biography (London: Fourth Estate, 1994)
- Arnold Weinstock: The Life and Times of Britain's Premier Industrialist (London: HarperCollinsBusiness, 1998).
- The Crunch: The Scandals of Northern Rock and the Looming Credit Crisis (London: Random House Business Books, 2008).
- The Crunch: How Greed and Incompetence Sparked the Credit Crisis (London: Random House Business Books, 2009).
- The Great Pensions Robbery: How the politicians betrayed retirement (London: Random House Business Books, 2011).
- Britain for Sale: British Companies in Foreign Hands – the Hidden Threat to Our Economy (London: Random House Business Books, 2012).
- Bad Banks: Greed, Incompetence and the Next Global Crisis (London: Random House Business Book, 2014).
- The Great British Reboot: How the UK Can Thrive in a Turbulent World (London: Yale University Press, 2020).

== Prizes ==
- Best Foreign Correspondent in the United States, Overseas Press Club (1989).
- Financial Journalist of the Year, British Press Awards (1999).
- Best City Journalist, Media Awards (2000).
- Senior Financial Journalist of the Year, Wincott Prize (2001).
- Newspaper Journalist of the Year, Work Foundation (2002).
- Business Journalist of the Year, World Leadership Forum (2006).
- Commentator of the Year, World Leadership Forum (2006).
- Magazine Commentator of the Year (New Statesman), The Comment Awards (2009).
- Financial Journalist of the Year, City of London Corporation (2013).

== Positions ==
- The Daily Mail City Editor (2000–present)
- The Mail on Sunday Consultant Editor (1999–present)
- The Guardian Associate Editor (1998–1999)
- The Guardian Financial Editor (1990–1999)
- The Guardian Foreign Editor (1989)
- The Guardian Washington Bureau Chief (1985–1989)
- The Guardian Washington Correspondent (1979–1985).

== Online sources ==
- Alex Brummer's New Statesman articles
- Alex Brummer's Jewish Chronicle articles
- Who's Who (London: A & C Black, 2006)
- Debrett's People of Today (London: Debrett's Peerage, 2006)
- Willings Press Guide (Cision UK, 2007)
- Israel's economy: the in-tray, Fathom: For a deeper understanding of Israel and the region, 30 January 2013
- First Industrial Nation meets Start-Up Nation in Fathom Spring (2016)
