= FLYER (magazine) =

- FLYER January 2007
- Editor: Ed Hicks
- Categories: Aviation magazine
- Frequency: Monthly
- Founded: 1990
- Company: Seager Publishing
- Country: UK
- Based in: Bath
- Language: English
- Website: flyer.co.uk
- ISSN: 0957-7645

FLYER is a monthly magazine for the UK general aviation community. It is published by Seager Publishing. The Magazine competes with Pilot and advertising-based freesheet, Loop. The headquarters of FLYER is in Bath.

FLYER is perhaps best known for the Flyer Forums, an online discussion forum focussing on the general aviation (GA) community.
