= World Leadership Awards =

The World Leadership Awards have been prepared by the World Leadership Forum of England, UK (reportedly dissolved as of 2012), and have been presented to city leaders who have shown exceptional imagination, foresight or resilience in a number of key fields - especially cities that have reversed trends, shaken off traditional images, and acted as an example and inspiration to others.

The Awards were instituted in 2005 and awarded in 2006 and 2007. Press releases from some winners have indicated that in 2006, around 400 cities worldwide, were invited to compete in 15 categories of urban quality and improvement.

Note that the Awards (or others of the same name) have since been awarded in 2012, after the apparent 2009 collapse of the sponsoring World Leadership Forum organization.

== Winners ==
(For full list of 2006 winners, see separate heading below.)

- World Leadership Awards

- category: Architecture & Civil Engineering
- category: Culture & the Arts
- category: Housing
- category: Economy &/or Employment
- category: Environment

- 2006 - Salt Lake City, Utah, USA

- category: Law & Order

- category: Urban Renewal

- 2005 - Phnom Penh, Cambodia
- 2006 - St. Louis, Missouri, USA

- Other Shortlist finalists for 2006:
* Kansas City, Missouri, USA
* Manchester, England, UK
* Calcutta, India

- category: Transport

- category: Utilities / Water / Conservation

- 2006 - Albuquerque, New Mexico, USA (mayor: Martin Chávez)

== Winners in 2006 ==
The winners of the 2006 World Leadership Awards were announced at the Royal Courts of Justice in London.

- Architecture & Civil Engineering: City of Lima - City of Yellow Stairs
- Economy & Employment: City of Kraków - Tourist Development
- Education & Development of the Young: City of Lagos - Community-Youth Integration
- Environment: City of Calgary - Making a difference
- Health: City of Mississauga - Healthy City Stewardship Centre
- Law & Order: City of Stuttgart - Partnership for Safety and Security
- Science & Technology: City of Lagos - Improving Quality of Lives
- Town Planning: City of Lima - South Ecological Park
- Transport: Mexico City - Sustainable Transport
- Urban Renewal: City of St. Louis - Strategy for Renewal
- Utilities: City of Albuquerque - Securing a Priceless Future
