= World Leadership Forum =

- World Leadership Forum Limited
- Formation: 9 September 2024 (UK incorporation; conclaves since 2019)
- Founder: Nachiket Joshi
- Type: International conference platform / Private limited company
- Headquarters: 134 Buckingham Palace Road, London, SW1W 9SA, England, UK
- Key people: Nachiket Joshi (Founder); Khushboo Shah (UK Organiser)
- Website: worldleadershipforum.org

The World Leadership Forum (WLF; incorporated in the United Kingdom as World Leadership Forum Limited, company number 15944560) is a London-based international dialogue platform founded by Nachiket Joshi and headquartered at 134 Buckingham Palace Road, London. The organisation convenes policymakers, business leaders, academics, and civil society representatives at annual multi-day conclaves and awards ceremonies in London focused on India–United Kingdom relations, public governance, environmental, social, and governance (ESG) initiatives, and sustainable development.

Previously, an earlier British non-governmental organisation also registered as The World Leadership Forum Limited (later The Leadership Forum, company number 04085053) operated in London under publishing executive Malcolm Turner from October 2000 until its dissolution in May 2009.

== Organisation and mission ==
Founded by Nachiket Joshi, the modern World Leadership Forum began organising bilateral India–UK conferences in London in 2019 and was formally incorporated in England and Wales on 9 September 2024 as World Leadership Forum Limited (company number 15944560), with its registered office at 134 Buckingham Palace Road, London. Its stated mission centres on cross-sector collaboration among policymakers, business leaders, academics, and youth across nine focus areas: digital innovation, environmental sustainability, global peace, youth mentorship, ethical leadership, cross-sector collaboration, education, leadership transformation, and global citizenship.

== London conclaves (2023–2025) ==
- 2025 Conclave (International Conclave 2025): Held from 19 to 23 November 2025 across venues in London and Harrow, organised by Nachiket Joshi and coordinated by Khushboo Shah in partnership with the Indian Diaspora in the UK (IDUK) and the Wey Foundation. Principal parliamentary sessions were hosted in the House of Commons by MP Joy Morrissey and in the House of Lords by Lord Sahota, alongside a civic reception at the Mayor's Parlour in Harrow hosted by Mayor of Harrow Anjana Patel. Speakers and attendees included MP Jack Rankin, Lord Ranger, former MP Virendra Sharma, Indo-European Business Forum founder Vijay Goel, and Indian columnist Suhel Seth.
- 2024 Conclave (International Conclave on Good Governance): Held from 11 to 13 September 2024 in London under the theme Viksit Bharat 2047 – India's Path to Leadership. The event opened at London City Hall with sessions on women's empowerment, climate change, and the Lifestyle for Environment initiative alongside the Women of Impact awards, hosted by London Assembly member Krupesh Hirani. On 12 September, a parliamentary session on governance was hosted at the House of Commons by MP Bob Blackman and Harrow Deputy Mayor Anjana Patel, which included a tribute to former MP Virendra Sharma and attendance by British MPs Seema Malhotra, Shivani Raja, Tanmanjeet Singh Dhesi, Deirdre Costigan, and Andy Slaughter, as well as Indian MP Umesh Patel. The conclave concluded on 13 September with a Gala Lunch at the House of Lords hosted by Lord German and a cultural programme at Brent Civic Centre.
- 2023 Conclave (India's Global Rise & Sustainability): Held from 19 to 21 September 2023 in London under the theme ESG Vision, Global Diaspora Excellence. The programme included an ESG panel session at London City Hall hosted with London Assembly member Krupesh Hirani, a delegation visit to the BAPS Shri Swaminarayan Mandir London, and the presentation of the Global Gandhi Awards at the House of Commons, chaired by MP Virendra Sharma.

== Former 2000–2009 organisation ==
From 1996 to 2009-2010, the earlier World Leadership Forum, Ltd., or Leadership Forum, Ltd. of London, England, UK—last under the leadership of publishing executive Malcolm Turner,—achieved international attention for organizing various awards and their presentation events, in a variety of high-profile, high-influence fields (which could attract large donors/sponsors). The organization partnered with various high-reputation individuals and institutions (particularly in the U.K., Europe and the United States), on various awards programs, in various years.

The organization incorporated as the "World Leadership Forum, Ltd." (or "...Limited") ("limited liability" organization) under British law in October 2000. It is listed as "struck off and dissolved" on May 19, 2009.

The organization's many awards programs—which apparently started in 1996, and peaked around 2005-2007—vanished around 2010. Subsequently, some appear to have re-emerged (sometimes under other names) under the auspices of various other organizations, in various places.

Many prominent cities, leaders and professionals cite these awards on their official or personal websites and other documents.

=== 1996–2010 awards programs ===
Major awards programs of the former World Leadership Forum, Ltd. included:

- World Leadership Awards
- Policymaker of the Year Awards
- Commentator of the Year Awards
- Business Leader of the Year Awards
- Business Journalist of the Year Awards
- Aerospace Journalist of the Year Awards (AJOYA)
- Science, Engineering & Technology (SET) Student of the Year Awards

Initially, the WLF's awards were chiefly the object of competition among British people, but widened over time to include Western Europeans and English-speaking nations (chiefly the United States); and then gradually expanded to encompass a fairly global range of candidates and award winners. Greatest participation and notoriety occurred around 2006, by most online indications.

Incomplete list of winners of the various World Leadership Forum awards:

- World Leadership Awards

- category: Architecture & Civil Engineering
- category: Culture & the Arts
- category: Housing
- category: Economy &/or Employment
- category: Environment

- 2006 - Salt Lake City, Utah, USA

- category: Law & Order

- category: Urban Renewal

- 2005 - Phnom Penh, Cambodia
- 2006 - St. Louis, Missouri, USA

- Other Shortlist finalists for 2006:
* Kansas City, Missouri, USA
* Manchester, England, UK
* Calcutta, India

- category: Transport

- category: Utilities / Water / Conservation

- 2006 - Albuquerque, New Mexico, USA (mayor: Martin Chávez)

- Policymaker of the Year Awards

- 2007 - Senator John McCain, United States

- Business Leader of the Year Awards

- 2006 - Stuart Rose
- 2006 - Niklas Zennström

- Commentator of the Year Awards

- 2006 - Alex Brummer

- Business Journalist of the Year Awards

- twice - Liam Halligan
- 2004 - Catherine Arnst
- 2005 - Ann Davis
- 2006 - Alex Brummer

- Aerospace Journalist of the Year Awards (AJOYA)

For a complete listing of the AJOYA winners, (but not the Shortlist finalists), see the Wikipedia page for the Aerospace Journalist of the Year Awards.
