= Aero Revue =

Aviation magazine in Switzerland

- Categories: Aviation magazine
- Frequency: Monthly
- Publisher: Swiss Aviation Media
- Founded: 1906; 120 years ago
- Country: Switzerland
- Based in: Brugg
- Language: German; French
- Website: Aéro Revue
- ISSN: 0001-9186
- OCLC: 4255274

Aéro Revue is a French and German aviation magazine published in Brugg, Switzerland. Founded in 1906, it is one of the oldest aviation magazines in the world. In addition, it is one of the largest aviation publications in the country.

== History and profile ==
The magazine was established in 1906. It was first called Bulletin and had two editions; German and French. It is published by Swiss Aviation Media on a monthly basis.

The magazine initially covered articles about ballooning and reported nothing about airplanes. It was previously based in Zürich. In 1926 it was renamed Aero Revue. The same year it became the official media outlet of the Swiss Aero Club.

In 1948 the circulation of Aero Revue was 10,000 copies.

== See also ==
- List of magazines in Switzerland
