= Teen Choice Award for Choice Music – Male Artist =

Entertainment award category

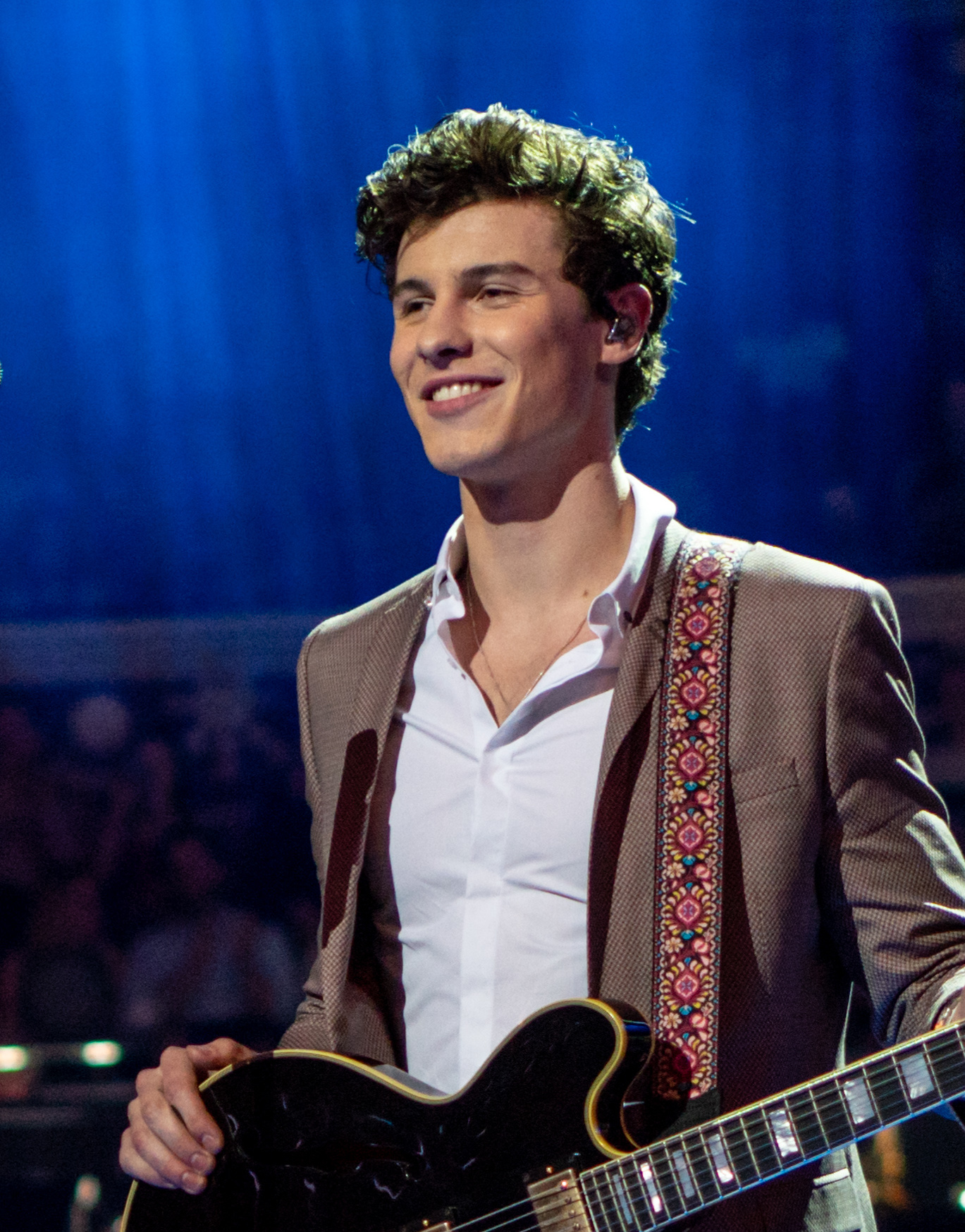
Shawn Mendes, winner of the 2019 Teen Choice Award for Choice Music – Male

The following is a list of Teen Choice Award winners and nominees for Choice Music – Male Artist. Justin Bieber is the most awarded artist in this category with 6 overall nominations and 5 awards . Aaron Carter is the youngest winner in 2001 at the age of 13. James Blunt is the oldest winner in 2006 at the age of 32.

== Winners and nominees ==
=== 1999 ===
| Year | Winner | Nominees | Ref. |
|---|---|---|---|
| 1999 | Ricky Martin | Ginuwine; Jay Z; R. Kelly; Jordan Knight; Mase; Puff Daddy; Will Smith | |

=== 2000s ===
| Year | Winner | Nominees | Ref. |
|---|---|---|---|
| 2000 | Sisqó | Marc Anthony; D'Angelo; Dr. Dre; Kid Rock; Lenny Kravitz; Ricky Martin; Will Smith | |
| 2001 | Aaron Carter | Eminem; Kid Rock; Lenny Kravitz; Lil' Bow Wow; Nelly; Shaggy; Sisqó | |
| 2002 | Ja Rule | Craig David; Enrique Iglesias; Jay Z; Ludacris; Moby; Nelly; Usher | |
| 2003 | Eminem | 50 Cent; JC Chasez; Ja Rule; John Mayer; Nelly; Sean Paul; Justin Timberlake | |
| 2004 | Justin Timberlake | Clay Aiken; Chingy; Jay Z; Ludacris; John Mayer; Usher; Kanye West | |
| 2005 | Jesse McCartney | 50 Cent; Eminem; The Game; Jack Johnson; John Legend; Snoop Dogg; Rob Thomas | |
| 2006 | James Blunt | Chris Brown; Daddy Yankee; Jack Johnson; T.I.; Kanye West | |
| 2007 | Justin Timberlake | Bow Wow; John Mayer; Ne-Yo; Timbaland | |
| 2008 | Chris Brown | Jesse McCartney; Justin Timberlake; Usher; Kanye West | |
| 2009 | Jason Mraz | Lil Wayne; Ne-Yo; Soulja Boy; Kanye West | |

=== 2010s ===
| Year | Winner | Nominees | Ref. |
|---|---|---|---|
| 2010 | Justin Bieber | Jason Derulo; Drake; Adam Lambert; Usher | |
| 2011 | Justin Bieber | Jason Derulo; CeeLo Green; Enrique Iglesias; Bruno Mars | |
| 2012 | Justin Bieber | Drake; Bruno Mars; Pitbull; Blake Shelton | |
| 2013 | Justin Bieber | Bruno Mars; Phillip Phillips; Pitbull; Justin Timberlake | |
| 2014 | Ed Sheeran | Jason Derulo; Austin Mahone; Pitbull; Justin Timberlake; Pharrell Williams | |
| 2015 | Ed Sheeran | Jason Derulo; Nick Jonas; Shawn Mendes; Pitbull; Sam Smith | |
| 2016 | Justin Bieber | Drake; Nick Jonas; Zayn Malik; Shawn Mendes; Charlie Puth | |
| 2017 | Harry Styles | Justin Bieber; Bruno Mars; Shawn Mendes; Ed Sheeran; The Weeknd | |
| 2018 | Louis Tomlinson | Drake; Niall Horan; Bruno Mars; Shawn Mendes; Ed Sheeran | |
| 2019 | Shawn Mendes | Khalid; Lil Nas X; Marshmello; Post Malone; Ed Sheeran | |
