= Pilot (British magazine) =

Monthly general aviation magazine based in the UK

Pilot is a monthly general aviation magazine based in the United Kingdom. It is "Britain's best selling GA magazine" and the only one still in print.

== History and profile ==
Pilot was launched in 1966. The former publisher was Lernhurst Publications Limited. The magazine is a part of Archant Specialist, from Archant. The headquarters is in Norwich.

The editor since 2011 is Philip Whiteman, who was deputy editor under James Gilbert, who served as editor and publisher before the magazine was acquired by Archant. Philip owns and operates a Piper Cub.

The magazine also operates PilotWeb, on which there is news, overviews of the magazine, forums and information for beginners in aviation.

In February 2022, Pilot was sold to Kelsey Media.

== Content ==
The magazine typically contains a news section, a number of flight tests and buyers guides, a section detailing what is involved in various flying activities, an 'adventure flying' section, an engineering section, and a historic aircraft news section. It is also the only UK GA magazine to include content on rotary-wing aircraft in every edition.
