= Dijon Duenas =

American singer (born 1992)

Dijon
- Also known as: Lillith
- Born: June 9, 1992 (age 34); Washington, United States
- Origin: Ellicott City, Maryland
- Genres: Alternative R&B; neo soul; Americana
- Occupations: Singer; songwriter; record producer
- Instruments: Vocals; drum machine; sampler; bass guitar; guitar
- Years active: 2012–present
- Labels: Dark Green, Dark Green; R&R; Warner
- Formerly of: Abhi//Dijon
- Website: dijondijon.com

Dijon Duenas (born June 9, 1992), known simply as Dijon, is an American singer-songwriter, record producer, actor, and multi-instrumentalist. Previously a member of alternative R&B duo Abhi//Dijon, Duenas began releasing solo material in 2017. After a string of singles and EPs, his debut studio album, Absolutely (2021) was released alongside an accompanying film. His second studio album, Baby, was released in August 2025 to critical acclaim.

A frequent collaborator of fellow singer-songwriter and producer Mk.gee, Duenas is also recognized for his work with Matt Champion, Charli XCX, Bon Iver, and Justin Bieber.

Duenas' accolades include nominations for two Grammy Awards at the 68th Annual Grammy Awards, for Producer of the Year, Non-Classical, and Album of the Year for his work on Justin Bieber's album Swag.

== Early life ==
Duenas was born in Washington on June 9, 1992, to a Guamanian father and mixed-race mother of black, white, and Native American descent. His parents met in the United States military after the Gulf War, and their military status resulted in Duenas frequently moving as a child, having lived in Germany, California, Hawaii, Iowa, Kentucky, Maryland, and Washington. Duenas began making music at sixteen years old, while living in Washington. While a junior high student in Victorville, California, Duenas was discouraged from rapping after losing a rap battle to classmate and future actor LaKeith Stanfield. He attended University of Maryland, College Park, along with future bandmate Abhirath Raju, where he earned a bachelor's degree in English language and literature in 2014.

== Music career ==
=== 2012–2016: Abhi//Dijon ===
Dijon's music career began as one half of the duo, Abhi//Dijon, which he formed with a high school friend, Abhirath Raju, while he was studying literature at the University of Maryland, College Park. Between 2012 and 2016, the duo released two EPs and one compilation. The duo released their last EP, Montana, in 2016.

=== 2016–2021: Early solo work ===
Duenas and Raju moved from Maryland to Los Angeles during the summer of 2016, and amicably disbanded shortly afterwards. He became a collaborator of hip-hop group Brockhampton, contributing backing vocals to Saturation II (2017). Later that year, he released his debut solo single, "Stranger". Also in 2017, Duenas co-wrote Brockhampton member Matt Champion's unreleased mixtape Mink, which leaked online in 2025. In July 2018, Duenas once again appeared as a backing vocalist on the Brockhampton single "1998 Truman". In September 2018, he released the single "Nico's Red Truck" alongside an accompanying music video. "Nico's Red Truck" was named the 35th best song of 2018 by Noisey. His first EP, Sci Fi 1, was released in 2019 and preceded by the singles "Cannonball" and "Drunk". Later that year, he released the singles "Good Luck" and "Crybaby".

In May 2020, Duenas' second EP, How Do You Feel About Getting Married?, was released. The same month, he was credited as a co-producer of "Pink Diamond", from Charli XCX's fourth album How I'm Feeling Now. In June, Duenas released an experimental project, Mothership Coming, under the pseudonym Lillith. Released exclusively on Bandcamp, proceeds from the project were donated to Black Woman's Blueprint, The Okra Project, the NAACP, Afrorack and Black Lives Matter LA. In December, he released the single "The Stranger", featuring John C. Reilly, Tobias Jesso Jr., and Becky and the Birds.

=== 2021–2023: Absolutely ===
On September 17, 2021, Duenas released "Many Times", the first single from his upcoming debut album. The second single, "Rodeo Clown", was released on October 22. Absolutely, released on November 5, was entirely self-produced by Duenas alongside frequent collaborator Mk.gee. Absolutely was accompanied by a film of the same name, which features Duenas performing six tracks from the album, with backing from Mk.gee, Henry Kwapis, Brad Oberhofer, Ryan Richter, and Gabe Noel. Duenas made his television debut on The Tonight Show on January 27, 2022, performing "Big Mike's". On June 26, 2022, "Many Times" was featured on former U.S. president Barack Obama's 2022 summer playlist.

Duenas opened for indie folk band Bon Iver during two shows on their Spring 2022 tour, in Mesa, Arizona and Austin, Texas. In August, Duenas appeared as a guest performer on Kenny Beats' debut album Louie. In June 2023, Duenas, along with Clairo and Bartees Strange, supported Boygenius during the inaugural Re:SET Concert Series.

=== 2024–present: Collaborations and Baby ===
In February 2024, Mk.gee released his debut studio album Two Star & the Dream Police, featuring production and songwriting by Duenas. Later that month, Duenas featured on "Aphid", the debut single by former Brockhampton member and Duenas' frequent collaborator Matt Champion, and the lead single from his first album Mika's Laundry. Duenas contributed heavily to the album, appearing as a songwriter and producer on seven tracks, including the single "Slow Motion", performed by Champion and Blackpink member Jennie. In October, Duenas contributed production and songwriting to Champion's single "Faye", from his first EP Slint's Favorite.

In April 2025, Duenas appeared as a featured artist on "Day One", from Bon Iver's fifth album Sable, Fable. That July, he produced and co-wrote several tracks on Justin Bieber's seventh album Swag, appearing as a performer on "Devotion" and a producer and songwriter on three other tracks, including "Daisies" and "Yukon", which peaked at numbers two and seventeen, respectively, on the Billboard Hot 100.

On August 8, Duenas announced his second album, Baby. The album was given a tentative release date one week later, dependent on sample clearance. Baby was released on schedule on August 15, and received critical acclaim from publications including Clash, NME, Pitchfork, and Rolling Stone. Three days after the album's release, Duenas announced a tour of North America and Europe.

On September 5, Bieber released his eighth studio album, Swag II, again featuring production and songwriting from Duenas, including on the lead single "Love Song". Later that month, Duenas made his acting debut in Paul Thomas Anderson's film One Battle After Another, appearing alongside fellow musicians Teyana Taylor, Alana Haim, and Junglepussy.

== Personal life ==
Duenas is married to stylist Joanie Del Santo, who is frequently referenced in his music. A photo of their wedding appears on the cover of Baby (2025), named after the couple's son.

== Discography ==
=== Studio albums ===
List of studio albums
Title	Album details
Absolutely	Released: November 5, 2021; Label: R&R, Warner; Formats: Streaming, digital download, LP, CD
Baby	Released: August 15, 2025; Label: R&R, Warner; Formats: Streaming, digital download, LP, CD

=== Extended plays ===
List of extended plays
Title	Album details
Sci Fi 1	Released: March 1, 2019; Label: Dark Green, R&R, Warner; Formats: Streaming, digital download
How Do You Feel About Getting Married?	Released: May 15, 2020; Label: Dark Green, R&R, Warner; Formats: Streaming, digital download

=== Singles ===
==== As lead artist ====
Title	Year	Peak chart positions	Album
Title	Year	US AAA	Album
"Stranger"	2017	—	Non-album singles
"Violence)"	2017	—	Non-album singles
"Skin"	2018	—	Non-album singles
"Wild"	2018	—	Non-album singles
"Nico's Red Truck"	2018	—	Non-album singles
"Cannonball"	2019	—	Sci Fi 1
"Drunk"	2019	—	Sci Fi 1
"Magic Loop" (with DJDS)	2019	—	Non-album singles
"Good Luck"	2019	—	Non-album singles
"Crybaby"	2019	—	Non-album singles
"Sweet Thing"	2020	—	Non-album singles
"The Stranger" (featuring Sachi, Dan Reeder, John C. Reilly, Tobias Jesso Jr., and Becky and the Birds)	2020	—	Non-album singles
"Many Times"	2021	—	Absolutely
"Rodeo Clown"	2021	—	Absolutely
"Coogie"	2023	—	Non-album single
"Yamaha"	2025	36	Baby

==== As featured artist ====
Title	Year	Album
"Makeup" (Zach Villere featuring Dijon)	2018	Singles 2017–2021
"Trust3000" (No Rome featuring Dijon)	2019	Non-album single
"On Me" (Mulherin featuring Dijon)	2019	Blurry
"Sweet Summer Sweat" (Jim-E Stack featuring Dijon)	2020	Ephemera
"Moonlit Breakers" (Paul Dally featuring Dijon)	2023	Moonlit Breakers
"Aphid' (Matt Champion featuring Dijon)	2024	Mika's Laundry

=== Guest appearances ===
List of non-single guest appearances, with other performing artists, showing year released and album name
Title	Year	Other performer(s)	Album
"Rope Swing"	2020	Zach Villere	Cardboard City
"Day One"	2025	Bon Iver, Flock of Dimes	Sable, Fable
"Devotion"	2025	Justin Bieber	Swag

=== Other credits ===
Songs credited on, with year, title, performer, credit received, and album listed
Title	Year	Performer(s)	Credit(s)	Album
"Summer"	2017	Brockhampton	Additional vocals	Saturation II
"1998 Truman"	2018	Brockhampton	Songwriting, additional vocals	Non-album single
"Ontario Sunshine"	2019	Foxes in Fiction	Guitar	Trillium Killer
"Pink Diamond"	2020	Charli XCX	Production, songwriting, synthesizer, drum programming	How I'm Feeling Now
"Giant Bat"	2020	Wens	Production, songwriting, programming	Giant Bat and Sad Sad
"Get Around"	2022	Kenny Beats	Vocals, songwriting	Louie
"New Low"	2024	Mk.gee	Production	Two Star & the Dream Police
"DNM"	2024	Mk.gee	Production, songwriting	Two Star & the Dream Police
"Gbiv"	2024	Matt Champion	Songwriting, additional production	Mika's Laundry
"Purify"	2024	Matt Champion	Songwriting, background vocals	Mika's Laundry
"Code Red"	2024	Matt Champion	Songwriting, background vocals	Mika's Laundry
"Aren't You Excited"	2024	Matt Champion	Production, songwriting, background vocals	Mika's Laundry
"Everybody Likes You"	2024	Matt Champion	Songwriting	Mika's Laundry
"Slow Motion"	2024	Matt Champion, Jennie	Production, songwriting	Mika's Laundry
"Faye"	2024	Matt Champion	Production, songwriting	Slint's Favorite
"Wait Up"	2024	Mulherin	Production	Paper and Plastic 02
"Daisies"	2025	Justin Bieber	Production, songwriting	Swag
"Yukon"	2025	Justin Bieber	Songwriting	Swag
"Things You Do"	2025	Justin Bieber	Production, songwriting	Swag
"Stay"	2025	Leith Ross	Background vocals	I Can See the Future
"Better Man"	2025	Justin Bieber	Production, songwriting	Swag II
"Love Song"	2025	Justin Bieber	Production, songwriting	Swag II
"Witchya"	2025	Justin Bieber	Production, songwriting	Swag II
"Eye Candy"	2025	Justin Bieber	Production, songwriting	Swag II
"Bad Honey"	2025	Justin Bieber	Production, songwriting	Swag II
"Need It"	2025	Justin Bieber	Production, songwriting	Swag II
"Oh Man"	2025	Justin Bieber	Production, songwriting	Swag II

=== Music videos ===
Title	Year	Director(s)
"Stranger"	2017	Taylor Clark
"Nico's Red Truck"	2018	Danica Kleinknecht
"Bad Luck"	2019	Jack Karaszewski
"Crybaby"	2019	Jack Karaszewski
"Do You Light Up?"	2020	Jack Karaszewski, Danica Kleinknecht
"Rock n Roll"	2020	Jaxon Demme
"Many Times"	2021	Jack Karaszewski

=== As Lillith ===
==== Mixtape ====
List of mixtapes
Title	Mixtape details
Mothership Coming	Released: June 16, 2020; Label: Independent; Formats: Streaming, digital download

=== With Abhi//Dijon ===
Extended plays

- Abhi//Dijon (2014)
- Stay Up (2015)
- Montana (2016)

Compilation

- 2014 (2015)

== Awards and nominations ==
Year	Award	Category	Nominated work	Result	Ref.
2025	Grammy Awards	Album of the Year	Swag	Nominated	
2025	Grammy Awards	Producer of the Year, Non-Classical	Himself	Nominated	
