= Love Song (Justin Bieber song) =

Single by Justin Bieber

from the album Swag II
- Released: September 19, 2025
- Genre: Pop
- Length: 2:52
- Label: Def Jam; ILH
- Songwriters: Justin Bieber; Eddie Benjamin; Carter Lang; Dylan Wiggins; Dijon Duenas; Michael Gordon; Tobias Jesso Jr.; Daniel Chetrit
- Producers: Benjamin; Lang; Wiggins; Dijon; Mk.gee

Justin Bieber singles chronology
"First Place" (2025)	"Love Song" (2025)	"Speed Demon" (2025)

"Love Song" is a song by Canadian singer Justin Bieber. It was sent to Italian radio airplay through Island Records Italy as the lead single from his eighth studio album, Swag II, on September 19, 2025. Bieber wrote the song with producers Eddie Benjamin, Carter Lang, Dylan Wiggins, Dijon, and Mk.gee, alongside Tobias Jesso Jr. and Daniel Chetrit.

== Composition and critical reception ==
"Love Song" was described by El Hunt of NME as "one of the record's strongest songs – plenty of room is left for jazzy licks of piano to ring out". Writing for Rolling Stone, Rob Sheffield saw "Love Song" as "one of the few worthy tunes" that "live up to the original [Swag album]'s adventurous spirit is clearly the peak, with a distorted piano loop — the one moment here where Mk.gee steps out" as "Bieber turns on the charm, crooning, 'I wanna write you a love song, baby/I wanna write a good one you can't stop singing to me'" and "he cruises around with the top down, as his lover's hair whips in the wind, serenading her with poetic images like 'It’s static happening on the radio station/Your eyebrows down in contemplation'". Katie Hawthorne of The Guardian noted that the track "has a gorgeous, screwed-up string-section and some tepid 'wooo!'s, neither of which can disguise how the track never earns those thrills", but felt that "rather, words fail Bieber as he sings about wanting to write his wife a love song – 'a good one'". Andrew Unterberger of Billboard ranked it as the best among the album's tracks and said that "this one just might do the trick", saying that it is "a tough title to make a distinctive pop song out of, but the production of 'Love Song' shimmers from the opening rustic, rumbling piano, which combines with some uncharacteristically hard-hitting drum songs for one of the punchiest sonic beds Bieber has worked with in this era" and explains that "he really earns it with the chorus".

== Charts ==
=== Weekly charts ===
Weekly chart performance
Chart (2025–2026)	Peak position
Bolivia Anglo Airplay (Monitor Latino)	9
Canada Hot 100 (Billboard)	63
Dominican Republic Anglo Airplay (Monitor Latino)	17
Estonia Airplay (TopHit)	84
Global 200 (Billboard)	139
Japan Hot Overseas (Billboard Japan)	15
Lithuania Airplay (TopHit)	50
New Zealand Hot Singles (RMNZ)	4
Norway (IFPI Norge)	99
Panama Anglo Airplay (Monitor Latino)	11
Sweden Heatseeker (Sverigetopplistan)	1
US Billboard Hot 100	88

=== Monthly charts ===
Monthly chart performance
Chart (2025)	Peak position
Lithuania Airplay (TopHit)	63
