= Speed Demon =

Speed Demon may refer to:

== Fictional entities ==
- Speed Demon (Marvel Comics)
- Speed Demon (Amalgam Comics)
- Speed Demon (DC Comics)

== Music ==
- "Speed Demon" (Michael Jackson song), 1989
- "Speed Demon" (Justin Bieber song), 2025
- "Speed Demon", a song by American band Keel from their album The Right to Rock
- "Speed Demon", a song by American band P.O.D. from their album The Awakening
- "Speed Demon", a song from U.D.O.'s 2009 album Dominator
- "Speed Demon", a sports anthemic composition by Yanni

== Films ==
- Speed Demon (1932 film), a Western film, directed by D. Ross Lederman
- Speed Demon (2003 film), a homoerotic horror film, directed by David Decoteau
- Speed Demon (2026 film)
