= Two Star & the Dream Police =

2024 album by Mk.gee

Studio album by Mk.gee
- Released: February 9, 2024
- Genres: Alternative R&B; neo-psychedelia; soft rock
- Length: 33:18
- Labels: R&R
- Producers: Michael Gordon; Dijon Duenas

Mk.gee chronology
A Museum of Contradiction (2020)	Two Star & the Dream Police (2024)

Singles from Two Star & the Dream Police
- 1. "Candy" / "How Many Miles" Released: August 11, 2023; 2. "Are You Looking Up" / "You Got It" Released: October 20, 2023; 3. "Dream Police" Released: January 19, 2024

Two Star & the Dream Police is the debut album by the American singer-songwriter, producer, and multi-instrumentalist Michael Gordon, known professionally as Mk.gee. Released on February 9, 2024, through R&R, the album was supported by three singles: "Candy" / "How Many Miles", "Are You Looking Up" / "You Got It", and "Dream Police".

The album received critical acclaim, with reviewers highlighting the lyrical content, production, and Gordon's vocal performances. It was listed as one of the best albums of 2024, with Clash, Dazed and The New York Times ranking it number one on their respective year-end lists. Additionally, Pitchfork named it one of the best albums of the first half of the 2020s. Commercially, Two Star & the Dream Police marked Gordon's first charting album, peaking at number 12 on the Scottish Albums Chart and number 8 on the UK Independent Albums Chart.

To support the album, Gordon embarked on a North American tour from April to May 2024, followed by a world tour spanning North America, Europe and Australia, which began in September and concluded in December. The concerts received praise from several publications.

== Background ==
Two Star & the Dream Police is Gordon's first release since his 2020 debut mixtape A Museum of Contradiction. In 2021, before beginning work on the album, Gordon collaborated with musician Dijon as a co-writer and co-producer on his debut studio album Absolutely. Dijon has since become a frequent collaborator of Gordon's.

=== Singles ===
The album was preceded by the release of three singles. The first, comprising "Candy" and "How Many Miles", was released as the double lead single for the then-unannounced album on August 11, 2023. Will Schube of Flood Magazine described "Candy" as a "funk-leaning lo-fi pop jam filled with psychedelic guitar squiggles and a magnificent use of vocoder" and "How Many Miles" as an R&B-inspired song that showcases Gordon's gifts as a songwriter and vocalist. In a February 2024 review of the album, Joshua Minsoo Kim of Rolling Stone referred to "How Many Miles" as a song about "feeling lost and finding yourself", calling it the album's highlight. Brady Brickner-Wood of Pitchfork wrote that "no song better illustrates Mk.gee's gifts than 'How many miles'".

A second double single, "Are You Looking Up" and "You Got It", was released on October 20, 2023. Both songs were met with critical praise, with Dazed including the former in its list of "20 best tracks of 2023", placing it at number 12, while the latter was named the 26th best song of the year by The Fader. In April 2024, Gordon made his debut live television performance on Jimmy Kimmel Live!, performing "Are You Looking Up". In June 2024, the track was featured in "Apologies", the ninth episode of the third season of the American comedy-drama series The Bear.

On January 19, 2024, the album's third and final single "Dream Police" was released, followed by the announcement of the album's release date and title. In February 2024, Gordon appeared as a musical guest, alongside Benji B, at the Jil Sander Fall Winter 2024 Runaway Show in Milan, performing "Dream Police", along with "How Many Miles" and "Alesis", a non-single track from the album.

== Composition ==
Musically, Two Star & the Dream Police has been described by Hypebeast as a "genre-surfing bedroom pop that's lo-fi yet bright [and] intimate yet expansive" record with elements of indie and alternative.

== Critical reception ==
Professional ratings
Aggregate scores
Source	Rating
Metacritic	83/100
Review scores
Source	Rating
Clash	8/10
The Guardian	5/5 stars
The Line of Best Fit	8/10
Pitchfork	7.8/10
Rolling Stone	4/5 stars

Upon release, Two Star & the Dream Police was met with acclaim from music critics. At Metacritic, which assigns a normalized rating out of 100 to reviews from mainstream critics, the album has an average score of 83, based on four reviews, indicating "universal acclaim".

Reviewing for Clash, Ana Lamond wrote, "There is an immersive quality across the tracklist that instantly strikes through. Each track is submerged in a nocturnal wash of acoustics, playful in its use of distance, textures and melody. [...] Sonically, Two Star & The [Dream] Police is able to defy the traditional conventions of a ballad, whilst reaching into a magnetic vulnerability through [Mk.gee]'s pen". Max Gayler of The Line of Best Fit praised the album, highlighting the lyrical content, production and Gordon's vocals, and wrote, "Clocking in at just over 33 minutes, these 12 songs carry the weight of an artistry so well studied and expertly executed. Pitchfork's writer Brady Brickner-Wood called it a "magnificent debut album", lauding its production and vocal performances, and said, "the magic of [the album is that] nothing in contemporary music sounds quite like it, yet it seems to have always been with us, hovering just outside the realm of possibility".

=== Critics' ranking ===
Two Star & the Dream Police has been featured in numerous publications' year-end listicles of the best albums of 2024. It claimed the number one spot in rankings by Clash, Dazed, and Jon Caramanica of The New York Times. The album also ranked within the top five on lists by Coup De Main, Gorilla vs. Bear, Los Angeles Times, and The New Yorker. It appeared in the top ten on lists from The Associated Press, Billboard, Crack, Hypebeast, The Line of Best Fit, The Ringer, and TURN, while also landing in the top 20 on lists by Exclaim!, The Guardian, NME, Pitchfork, and Rolling Stone. Additionally, it appeared in the top 50 on rankings by Alternative Press, Beats Per Minute, Complex, The Fader, Flood Magazine, KCRW, NPR, Stereogum, and Vogue, and in the top 100 by Paste and Uproxx. Apple Music included the album in its "Favorite Albums of 2024" list, while Vulture placed it in the honorable mentions of its best albums ranking. In October 2024, Pitchfork also named Two Star & the Dream Police as one of the best albums of the first half of the 2020s.

Among the album's tracks, "Alesis" appeared most frequently on critics' lists of the year's best songs, with Coup De Main and Vulture ranking it number one, while Gorilla vs. Bear, NME, and The Ringer placed it in their top ten, at fourth, seventh, and sixth, respectively. The song also appeared in the top 100 on year-end lists by Billboard, Paste, and Uproxx. Additionally, Spotify included it in its music editors' picks for the best songs of the year. Moreover, "Are You Looking Up" was ranked the 12th best song of 2023 by Dazed, the seventh best song of 2024 by The Fader, and one of the best songs of the first half of 2024 by Los Angeles Times. The Fader ranked "You Got It" as the 26th best song of 2023. "How Many Miles" was ranked the ninth best song of 2024 by Clash, while "Breakthespell" was placed 11th in Resident Advisor's "Best Tracks of 2024" list. In addition, "I Want" and "Little Bit More" were each named among the best songs of the first half of 2024 by NPR and The New York Times, respectively.

Select year-end rankings for Two Star & the Dream Police
Publication	Accolade	Rank	Ref.
Clash	Albums of the Year 2024	1	
Coup De Main	The Best Albums of 2024	4	
Crack	The Top 50 Albums of 2024	6	
Dazed	The 20 best albums of 2024	1	
Gorilla vs. Bear	Gorilla vs. Bear's Albums of 2024	2	
The Line of Best Fit	The Best Albums of 2024	7	
Los Angeles Times	The 20 best albums of 2024	3	
The New York Times	Jon Caramanica's Best Albums of 2024	1	
The New Yorker	The Best Albums of 2024	2	
The Ringer	The Ringer's 30 Best Albums of 2024	6	

Mid-decade rankings for Two Star & the Dream Police
Publication	Accolade	Rank	Ref.
Pitchfork	100 Best Albums of the 2020s so far	91	

== Promotion and tours ==
After the release of the two lead singles, Gordon announced a 5-show tour in 2023 called Inside Each of Us Are Two Stars, which included shows in Brooklyn (October 16 at the Music Hall of Williamsburg), Toronto (October 18 at the Great Hall), Chicago (October 21 at the Lincoln Hall), Los Angeles (November 1 at the Roxy Theatre), and San Francisco (November 3 at Rickshaw Stop). On February 16, Gordon held a one-night live show in London. The show was originally set to be held at Oslo Hackney, but was moved to the EartH Hall, a larger venue, due to high demand.

On February 24, 2024, Gordon made an appearance at the Jil Sander Fall Winter 2024 Runaway Show in Milan, performing "How Many Miles", "Alesis" and "Dream Police", alongside Benji B. On April 11, 2024, Gordon performed "Are You Looking Up" on the late-night talk show Jimmy Kimmel Live!, marking his debut performance on television. On November 9, 2024, he appeared as a musical guest on Saturday Night Live, performing "Alesis" alongside a standalone single "Rockman".

Gordon embarked on a longer, 18-show tour in North America to promote Two Star & the Dream Police. The tour began on April 23, 2024, in San Diego, California and concluded on May 19, 2024, in Boston, Massachusetts. It was then followed by Gordon's first world tour spanning North America, Europe and Australia. The tour began on September 2, 2024, in Vancouver, Canada, and concluded on December 7, 2024, in Melbourne, Australia. The tour was met with praise from several publications. Nathan Evans of The Guardian noted that Mk.gee played to "a heaving venue of newfound obsessives with arena rock energy", while Naz Hamdi of NME described his London show as "an almost religious experience, a shared moment of reverence in rhythm". Jeff Ihaza of Rolling Stone highlighted the "bodily sensation of music" at his Brooklyn performance and likened his guitar work to Prince, and Kristin Robinson of Billboard wrote that his Los Angeles concert was "more captivating and enigmatic than even his recorded music", calling it "a show that kept the spotlight fixed on the artist's work rather than the artist himself".

Gordon also released a series of live versions of "Dream Police", "Are You Looking Up", "Candy", "Little Bit More", and "Alesis" on his YouTube channel between January and June 2024. His live performances have led to increased demand for a live version of the album from both critics and fans. In 2024, English musician Eric Clapton mentioned Gordon when he was asked about modern guitarists who excite him, noting Gordon's "unique" skills and commenting that he "has found things to do on the guitar that are like nobody else. [...] And he can do it live". Clapton also compared Gordon's "innovative style" to that of Prince "when [he] came on the scene".

== Track listing ==
Credits adapted from Spotify.

All tracks are written by Michael Gordon, except where noted. All tracks are produced by Gordon, except "New Low" and "DNM", which are produced by Gordon and Dijon Duenas.

Two Star & the Dream Police track listing
No.	Title	Writer(s)	Length
1.	"New Low"		2:06
2.	"How Many Miles"		2:21
3.	"Are You Looking Up"		2:46
4.	"DNM"	Gordon; Duenas	1:58
5.	"You Got It"	John Keuch; Gordon; Sam Wilkes	2:14
6.	"Rylee & I"		2:22
7.	"Candy"		2:54
8.	"I Want"		3:38
9.	"Alesis"		3:18
10.	"Breakthespell"		4:27
11.	"Little Bit More"		2:19
12.	"Dream Police"	Keuch; Gordon	2:49
Total length:			33:18

- "How Many Miles", "You Got It", and "Dream Police" are stylized in sentence case.

== Personnel ==
Credits adapted from Discogs.

Technical

- Michael Gordon – mixing
- Heba Kadry – mastering (tracks 2, 7)
- Simon Lancelot – mastering (tracks 1, 3–6, 8–12)

Artwork

- Nicholas D'Apolito – graphic design
- Danica Kleinknecht – photography

== Charts ==
Chart performance for Two Star & the Dream Police
Chart (2024–2025)	Peak position
French Rock & Metal Albums (SNEP)	91
Scottish Albums (Official Charts)	12
UK Independent Albums (Official Charts)	8
