= Baby (Dijon album) =

Studio album by Dijon
- Released: August 15, 2025
- Genres: R&B; soul; experimental; pop
- Length: 37:45
- Labels: R&R; Warner

Dijon chronology
Absolutely (2021)	Baby (2025)

Baby is the second studio album by American musician Dijon. It was released on August 15, 2025, on R&R and Warner Records. It received widespread acclaim from critics upon its release.

== Background and release ==
The follow-up to Dijon's 2021 debut album Absolutely, Baby was announced on August 8, 2025, one week before its release, alongside a countdown clock labeled "until the album Baby (unless samples don’t get cleared)". The album also follows Justin Bieber's 2025 album Swag and Bon Iver's 2025 album Sable, Fable, both of which featured contributions from Dijon. Baby is also Dijon's first album since becoming a father, which serves as a theme of the album.

Released with no preceding singles, Baby features production from Andrew Sarlo and additional contributions from BJ Burton, Henry Kwapis, Tommy King, and Tobias Jesso Jr., and frequent Dijon collaborator Mk.gee. Three days after the album's release, Dijon announced a tour of North America and Europe in support of the album in late 2025 and early 2026.

== Critical reception ==
Professional ratings
Aggregate scores
Source	Rating
AnyDecentMusic?	8.4/10
Metacritic	94/100
Review scores
Source	Rating
AllMusic	4.5/5 stars
Clash	8/10
NME	4/5 stars
Paste	10/10
Pitchfork	9.0/10
Rolling Stone	4.5/5 stars

Baby was met with widespread acclaim from music critics upon its release. At Metacritic, which assigns a normalized rating out of 100 to reviews from mainstream critics, the album has an average score of 94, based on seven reviews, indicating "universal acclaim".

In a perfect 10/10 review for Paste, reviewer Matt Mitchell declared that "Dijon is R&B's past, present, and future," writing, "Baby is full of electronic mood swings and vocal stacking where guitars rambled on Absolutely. Dijon goes as far as manipulating his voice into an instrument, sampling himself over and over atop ecstatic ride grooves and noodly riffs until the phrasings are unrecognizable." At Pitchfork, it received a 9.0/10, with writer Ivy Nelson describing it as "a spectacular new vision of soul, pop, and R&B," and drawing parallels to the work of Frank Ocean, Bilal, D'Angelo, Common, Bon Iver, and Prince. In a review for Flood Magazine, Juan Gutierrez praised the album, writing that Dijon "blends his familiar take on contemporary R&B with a glitchier, more psychedelic version of those sonic textures in order to evoke a fractured, internet-like aesthetic that’s often mesmerizing," noting the "postmodern, stitched-together quality between the samples, synths, and beats, unifying itself in an off-beat way that also recalls J Dilla."

In a 4.5/5 star review for Rolling Stone, Jeff Ihaza wrote, "Throughout the album, fragments of sounds—fiery adlibs, Golden Age hip-hop samples, whizzing, inverted vocal riffs—all jut out like beams of light piercing through the pitch black of night," concluding that "the record is indeed best described by that all-encompassing word, experimental." Writing for The New Yorker, Brady Brickner-Wood explained that on Baby, Dijon "retains the freewheeling, analog approach that he adopted on Absolutely, while, once again, expanding the potential parameters of popular music. Distorted drum samples smash against twinkling synth keys; piano is re-amped and fried into fragments; warm electric guitar licks dissolve into noisy FX, FM radio rips, and the odd Wu-Tang Clan sample."

=== Rankings ===
Publication	List	Rank	Ref
Pitchfork	The 50 Best Albums of 2025	2	
Paste	The 50 Best Albums of 2025	5	
NME	The 50 Best Albums of 2025	33	
Rolling Stone	The 100 Best Albums of 2025	4	
Consequence	The 50 Best Albums of 2025	27	
The Fader	The 50 Best Albums of 2025	13	

== Track listing ==
Digital & physical editions
No.	Title	Writer(s)	Producer(s)	Length
1.	"Baby!"	Dijon Duenas; Buddy Ross; Henry Kwapis; Tobias Jesso Jr.	Dijon; Andrew Sarlo	3:40
2.	"Another Baby!"	Duenas; Kwapis; Jesso; Ryan Richter	Dijon; Sarlo; Mk.gee	3:27
3.	"Higher!"	Duenas; James Harmon; Alan Parker; Asher Weisberg; Jenn Wasner; Justin Vernon	Dijon; Sarlo; Mk.gee	3:57
4.	"(Freak It)"	Duenas	Dijon	1:43
5.	"Yamaha"	Duenas; Cara Delevingne; Carter Lang; Daniel Chetrit; Eli Teplin; Michael Gordon; Tommy King	Dijon; Sarlo	4:28
6.	"Fire!"	Duenas; Kwapis; King; Brandon J Burton	Dijon; BJ Burton	2:40
7.	"(Referee)"	Duenas	Dijon	1:05
8.	"Rewind"	Duenas; Kwapis; Jack Karaszewski	Dijon	2:33
9.	"My Man"	Duenas; Burton; Teplin; Kwapis; Richter	Dijon; Sarlo	3:59
10.	"Loyal & Marie"	Duenas; Kwapis; Jesso	Dijon; Sarlo; Burton; Mk.gee; Tommy King	2:33
11.	"Automatic"	Duenas; Burton; Kwapis; King	Dijon; Sarlo; Burton; King	2:58
12.	"Kindalove"	Duenas; Ethan Gruska; Kwapis; Gordon	Dijon; Sarlo; Mk.gee	4:37
Total length:				37:45

Physical editions only
No.	Title	Writer(s)	Producer(s)	Length
13.	"Nü Diamond"	Duenas; Gordon; Pino Palladino; Burton	Dijon; Mk.gee; Burton	2:28
Total length:				40:14

== Personnel ==
Credits adapted from Tidal.

=== Musicians ===
- Dijon Duenas – vocals, guitar (1, 2, 4–6), samples (1, 3, 9, 11), drum programming (1), drums (2–6, 8, 11, 12), synthesizer (2, 9, 12), turntables (2, 6), keyboards (3), percussion (3), fuzz guitar (5), piano (5, 6), background vocals (5), bass (6), additional synthesizer (8), additional vocals (8), resonator guitar (10)
- Michael Gordon – drums (1, 12), bass (2, 12), piano (2, 12), percussion (2), samples (3), loops (12), whistle (12)
- Tommy King – piano (1, 3), bass synthesizer (2), organ (3, 10), harmonizer (6), synthesizer (11)
- Pino Palladino – bass (1, 3, 5, 6, 10, 11)
- Buddy Ross – piano (1), synthesizer (5)
- Mama Joanie – vocals (1)
- Baby June – vocals (1)
- Henry Kwapis – fuzz guitar (2), percussion (3), bass (8)
- Ryan Richter – guitar (3, 11)
- Alan Parker – piano (3)
- Jenn Wasner – bass (3)
- Justin Vernon – additional vocals (3)
- Andrew Sarlo – drums (5), bass (9)
- Eli Teplin – synthesizer (5, 9)
- Carter Lang – co–production (5)
- Zsela – background vocals (5)
- BJ Burton – loops (6, 11), organ (10), synthesizer (10)
- Jack Karaszewski – synthesizer (8)
- Tobias Jesso Jr. – vocals (10)
- Ethan Gruska – organ (12), whistle (12)

=== Technical ===
- Dijon – mixing, recording engineering
- Andrew Sarlo – mixing and recording engineering (1–3, 5–7, 9–12)
- BJ Burton – recording engineering (1, 5, 6, 11), mixing (11)
- Simon Lancelot – mastering (1–10)
- Michael Gordon – mixing (2, 3)
- Asher Weisberg – recording engineering (3)

== Charts ==
Chart performance for Baby
Chart (2025)	Peak position
Australian Hip Hop/R&B Albums (ARIA)	36
UK R&B Albums (Official Charts)	11
UK Record Store (Official Charts)	33
US Top Current Album Sales (Billboard)	40
