= Fair Trade (song) =

2021 song by Drake featuring Travis Scott

Song by Drake featuring Travis Scott

from the album Certified Lover Boy
- Released: September 3, 2021
- Recorded: 2020 – 2021
- Genre: Alternative hip-hop; R&B; trap
- Length: 4:51
- Label: Republic; OVO
- Songwriters: Aubrey Graham; Jacques Webster II; Ozan Yildirim; Ebony Oshunrinde; Jahaan Sweet; Stephane Reibaldi; Charlotte Wilson; Kenneth Edmonds; Varrel Wade; Marcus Reddick; Brandon Banks; Kyla Moscovich; Michael Gordon; Dernst Emile II; Teo Halm
- Producers: Travis Scott; OZ; WondaGurl; Sweet; Patron

"Fair Trade" is a song by Canadian rapper Drake featuring vocals and production from American rapper and record producer Travis Scott. It was released on September 3, 2021, as the sixth track on Drake's sixth studio album Certified Lover Boy.

== Composition ==
"Fair Trade" contains samples of "Mountains", written by Charlotte Day Wilson, Brandon Banks, D'Mile, Babyface, Kyle Moscovitch, Marcus Reddick, Mk.gee, Teo Halm, and Varren Wade, as performed by the former.

== Charts ==
=== Weekly charts ===
Chart performance for "Fair Trade"
Chart (2021–2022)	Peak position
Australia (ARIA)	3
Australia Hip-Hop/R&B Singles (ARIA)	3
Austria (Ö3 Austria Top 40)	11
Canada Hot 100 (Billboard)	4
Czech Republic Singles Digital (ČNS IFPI)	34
Denmark (Tracklisten)	5
France (SNEP)	14
Germany (GfK)	45
Global 200 (Billboard)	4
Greece International (IFPI)	2
Hungary (Single Top 40)	28
Hungary (Stream Top 40)	17
Iceland (Tónlistinn)	8
India International Singles (IMI)	6
Ireland (IRMA)	4
Italy (FIMI)	38
Latvia (Latvijas Radio 5 Top 40)	31
Lithuania (AGATA)	11
Malaysia (RIM)	17
Netherlands (Single Top 100)	12
New Zealand (Recorded Music NZ)	3
Norway (VG-lista)	8
Portugal (AFP)	6
Singapore (RIAS)	12
Slovakia (Singles Digitál Top 100)	21
South Africa (TOSAC)	1
Spain (Promusicae)	99
Sweden (Sverigetopplistan)	17
Switzerland (Schweizer Hitparade)	7
UK Singles (Official Charts)	3
UK Hip Hop/R&B (Official Charts)	2
US Billboard Hot 100	3
US Hot R&B/Hip-Hop Songs (Billboard)	3
US Rhythmic Airplay (Billboard)	25

=== Year-end charts ===
2021 year-end chart performance for "Fair Trade"
Chart (2021)	Position
Canada (Canadian Hot 100)	86
Global 200 (Billboard)	167
Portugal (AFP)	160
US Hot R&B/Hip-Hop Songs (Billboard)	47

=== Year-end charts ===
2022 year-end chart performance for "Fair Trade"
Chart (2022)	Position
US Hot R&B/Hip-Hop Songs (Billboard)	84

== Certifications ==
Certifications and sales for "Fair Trade"
Region	Certification	Certified units/sales
Australia (ARIA)	3× Platinum	210,000^{‡}
Denmark (IFPI Danmark)	Platinum	90,000^{‡}
France (SNEP)	Gold	100,000^{‡}
Italy (FIMI)	Platinum	100,000^{‡}
New Zealand (RMNZ)	2× Platinum	60,000^{‡}
Poland (ZPAV)	Gold	25,000^{‡}
Portugal (AFP)	Platinum	10,000^{‡}
United Kingdom (BPI)	Platinum	600,000^{‡}
United States (RIAA)	5× Platinum	5,000,000^{‡}
Streaming
Greece (IFPI Greece)	Platinum	2,000,000^{†}
^{‡} Sales+streaming figures based on certification alone.^{†} Streaming-only figures based on certification alone.
