= Rockman (song) =

2024 single by Mk.gee

Single by Mk.gee
- Released: October 18, 2024
- Length: 2:59
- Label: R&R
- Songwriters: Michael Gordon; Zack Sekoff
- Producer: Mk.gee

Mk.gee singles chronology
| "Lonely Fight" (2024) | "Rockman" (2024) |

"Rockman" is a song by American singer-songwriter, producer, and multi-instrumentalist Michael Gordon, known professionally as Mk.gee. Released on October 18, 2024, through R&R, it serves as Gordon's second standalone single, following "Lonely Fight", after the release of his debut album Two Star & the Dream Police (2024).

Receiving critical acclaim, the song became Gordon's first charting single, appearing on several Billboard alternative airplay charts. It was nominated for Record of the Year at the 2025 Libera Awards.

== Composition ==
"Rockman" is composed in the key of D-sharp major with a time signature of 4/4, and has a tempo around 134 beats per minute.

== Live performance ==
On November 9, 2024, Gordon appeared as a musical guest on Saturday Night Live where he performed "Rockman" along with "Alesis", a non-single track from Two Star & the Dream Police.

== Commercial performance ==
"Rockman" marked Gordon's first charting song, debuting at number 33 on the US Adult Alternative Airplay Chart and at number 35 on the US Rock & Alternative Airplay Chart for the week ending December 21, 2024. The following week, it entered the US Alternative Airplay Chart at number 37. It eventually peaked at numbers 24, 30, and 25, respectively.

== Reception ==
=== Year-end lists ===
| Publication | Accolade | Rank | Ref. |
|---|---|---|---|
| Los Angeles Times | The 30 best songs of 2024 | 19 | |
| Paper | Paper's Best Songs of 2024 | Unranked | |
| Stereogum | Scott Lapatine's Best Songs of 2024 | 2 | |

== Charts ==
Chart performance for "Rockman"
| Chart (2024–2025) | Peak position |
|---|---|
| US Adult Alternative Airplay (Billboard) | 24 |
| US Alternative Airplay Chart (Billboard) | 25 |
| US Rock & Alternative Airplay (Billboard) | 30 |
