= Swag II =

Studio album by Justin Bieber
- Released: September 5, 2025
- Genres: R&B; synth-pop
- Length: 76:50
- Labels: ILH; Def Jam
- Producers: !DubMagic!; Buddy Ross; Camper; Carter Lang; Daniel Chetrit; Dijon; Eddie Benjamin; Eli Teplin; Hurricane Chris; Jackson Morgan; Mike Will Made It; Mk.gee; Sir Dylan; Will Miller; Zach Nahome

Justin Bieber chronology
Swag (2025)	Swag II (2025)	Swag Live From Coachella (Weekend I) (2026)

Singles from Swag II
- 1. "Love Song" Released: September 19, 2025; 2. "Speed Demon" Released: September 22, 2025; 3. "Bad Honey" Released: October 6, 2025

Swag II ratings
Aggregate scores
Source	Rating
Metacritic	48/100
Review scores
Source	Rating
Clash	6/10
The Guardian	2/5 stars
NME	3/5 stars
Pitchfork	5.2/10
Rolling Stone	2/5 stars

Swag II is the eighth studio album by Canadian singer Justin Bieber. It was surprise-released through Def Jam Recordings and ILH Productions on September 5, 2025. The album contains guest appearances from Tems, Bakar, Hurricane Chris, Lil B, and Eddie Benjamin. Production was handled by Dijon, Carter Lang, Mike Will Made It, Buddy Ross, Daniel Chetrit, !DubMagic!, Mk.gee, and Dylan Wiggins, among others. Swag II is an R&B and synth-pop album that was supported by three singles: "Love Song", "Speed Demon", and "Bad Honey".

It is a double album that consists of 23 tracks in addition to the 21 songs from its sister album, Swag, which was released on July 11 that year. In support of both albums, Bieber performed a cell phone-free private concert at the Roxy Theatre in West Hollywood, California, on March 29, 2026, where he performed 25 songs within both albums in support of them, with all of them other than three making their live debuts. The 56-day gap between the releases of Swag and Swag II marks the shortest period between Bieber's releases to date. The album received mixed reviews from critics, with many criticizing its long runtime and lack of cohesion.

== Commercial performance ==
In the United States, Swag II was combined with Swag for tracking and charting purposes, propelling the latter back into the top ten of the Billboard 200 at number four with 80,000 equivalent album units. In regions where the two were charted separately, Swag II peaked at number one in Denmark and reached the top ten in New Zealand and Norway.

== Track listing ==
Swag II track listing
No.	Title	Writer(s)	Producer(s)	Length
1.	"Speed Demon"	Justin Bieber; Eddie Benjamin; Carter Lang; Dylan Wiggins; Daniel Chetrit; Jackson Lee Morgan; Tobias Jesso Jr.	Benjamin; Lang; Wiggins; Chetrit; Maejor^{[v]}	3:31
2.	"Better Man"	Bieber; Benjamin; Lang; Wiggins; Dijon Duenas; Buddy Ross; Jesso; Chetrit	Benjamin; Lang; Wiggins; Dijon; Ross; Chetrit; Maejor^{[v]}	2:49
3.	"Love Song"	Bieber; Benjamin; Lang; Wiggins; Duenas; Mk.gee; Jesso; Chetrit	Benjamin; Lang; Wiggins; Dijon; Mk.gee; Maejor^{[v]}	2:52
4.	"I Do"	Bieber; Benjamin; Lang; Wiggins; Jesso; Chetrit; Morgan	Benjamin; Lang; Wiggins; Maejor^{[v]}	3:43
5.	"I Think You're Special" (with Tems)	Bieber; Temilade Openiyi; Benjamin; Lang; Wiggins; Jesso; Chetrit; Morgan; James Fauntleroy	Benjamin; Lang; Wiggins; Maejor^{[v]}	2:45
6.	"Mother in You"	Bieber; Jesso; Benjamin; Lang; Wiggins; Chetrit; Morgan; Eli Teplin	Benjamin; Lang; Wiggins; Chetrit; Morgan; Teplin; Maejor^{[v]}	3:25
7.	"Witchya"	Bieber; Benjamin; Lang; Wiggins; Duenas; Chetrit; Jesso	Benjamin; Lang; Wiggins; Dijon; Chetrit; Maejor^{[v]}	2:43
8.	"Eye Candy"	Bieber; Benjamin; Lang; Wiggins; Duenas; Chetrit; Will Miller; Jesso; Morgan	Benjamin; Lang; Wiggins; Dijon; Chetrit; Miller; Maejor^{[v]}	3:57
9.	"Don't Wanna" (with Bakar)	Bieber; Abubakar Shariff-Farr; Michael Williams II; Benjamin; Lang; Wiggins; Zach Nahome; Chetrit	Mike Will Made It; Benjamin; Lang; Wiggins; Zach Nahome	2:45
10.	"Bad Honey"	Bieber; Benjamin; Lang; Wiggins; Duenas; Jesso; Chetrit	Benjamin; Lang; Wiggins; Dijon; Maejor^{[v]}	2:36
11.	"Need It"	Bieber; Openiyi; Benjamin; Lang; Wiggins; Duenas; Chetrit; Jesso; Morgan	Benjamin; Lang; Wiggins; Dijon; Chetrit; Maejor^{[v]}	3:39
12.	"Oh Man"	Bieber; Jesso; Lang; Wiggins; Duenas; Chetrit	Lang; Wiggins; Dijon; Chetrit; Maejor^{[v]}	3:12
13.	"Poppin'My Shit" (with Hurricane Chris)	Bieber; Christopher Dooley; Brandon Green; Lang; Ce'Rone Bradley	{{hlist|Hurricane Chris|Maejor^{[p]}|Lang|DubMagic|	2:06
14.	"All the Way"	Bieber; Benjamin; Lang; Wiggins; Darhyl Camper Jr.; Miller; Jesso; Morgan	Benjamin; Lang; Wiggins; Camper; Miller; Maejor^{[v]}	3:21
15.	"Petting Zoo"	Bieber; Benjamin; Lang; Wiggins; Morgan	Benjamin; Lang; Wiggins; Maejor^{[v]}	3:16
16.	"Moving Fast"	Bieber; Lang; Chetrit; Jesso; Morgan	Lang; Chetrit; Maejor^{[v]}	3:21
17.	"Safe Space" (with Lil B)	Bieber; Brandon McCartney; Lang; Wiggins; Teplin	Lang; Wiggins; Teplin	3:14
18.	"Lyin'"	Bieber; Benjamin; Lang; Wiggins; Chetrit; Morgan	Benjamin; Lang; Wiggins; Maejor^{[v]}	3:06
19.	"Dotted Line"	Bieber; Lang; Morgan	Lang; Morgan	2:27
20.	"Open Up Your Heart" (with Eddie Benjamin)	Bieber; Benjamin; Lang; Wiggins; Miller; Teplin; Jesso; Chetrit; Morgan	Benjamin; Lang; Wiggins; Miller; Teplin	3:34
21.	"When It's Over"	Bieber; Benjamin; Lang; Wiggins; Jesso; Chetrit; Morgan	Benjamin; Lang; Wiggins	2:34
22.	"Everything Hallelujah"	Bieber; Benjamin; Lang; Wiggins; Teplin; Jesso; Chetrit; Morgan	Benjamin; Lang; Wiggins; Teplin	4:08
23.	"Story of God"	Bieber; Lang; Teplin; Judah Smith; Wes Halliburton	Lang; Teplin	7:46
Total length:				76:50

=== Notes ===
- ^{^[p]} indicates a primary and vocal producer
- ^{^[v]} indicates a vocal producer
- All track titles are stylized in all caps.
- Disc 2 of Swag II mirrors the track listing of the standard edition of Swag.

== Personnel ==
Credits adapted from Tidal.

- Justin Bieber – vocals
- Josh Gudwin – mixing (all tracks), engineering (tracks 1, 4, 8, 14, 16)
- Dale Becker – mastering
- Felix Byrne – engineering (1, 3–23), additional engineering (2)
- Zeke Mishanec – engineering (2, 3, 7, 9)
- Denis Kosiak – engineering (2, 15, 16)
- Mark Parfitt – engineering (7, 10)
- Javier Martinez Cruces – engineering (20)
- Adam Burt – mastering assistance
- Katie Harvey – mastering assistance
- Kegn Venegas – mastering assistance
- Noah McCorkle – mastering assistance
- Rich Evatt – engineering assistance (2, 3)
- Wilfried Haslauer – engineering assistance (7)
- Kevin Cartwright – engineering assistance (9)
- Tems – additional vocals (5), background vocals (11)
- Bakar – vocals (9)
- Hurricane Chris – vocals (13)
- Lil B – vocals (17)
- Eddie Benjamin – vocals (20)
- Eli Teplin – piano (20)

== Charts ==
Chart performance
Chart (2025–2026)	Peak position
Danish Albums (Hitlisten)	1
French Albums (SNEP)	24
Icelandic Albums (Tónlistinn)	20
Italian Albums (FIMI)	27
Japanese Digital Albums (Oricon)	29
Japanese Hot Albums (Billboard Japan)	19
New Zealand Albums (RMNZ)	6
Nigerian Albums (TurnTable)	73
Norwegian Albums (IFPI Norge)	7
Swedish Albums (Sverigetopplistan)	55

== Certifications ==
Certifications
Region	Certification	Certified units/sales
Canada (Music Canada)	Platinum	80,000^{‡}
Denmark (IFPI Danmark)	Gold	10,000^{‡}
^{‡} Sales+streaming figures based on certification alone.
