= Sable (EP) =

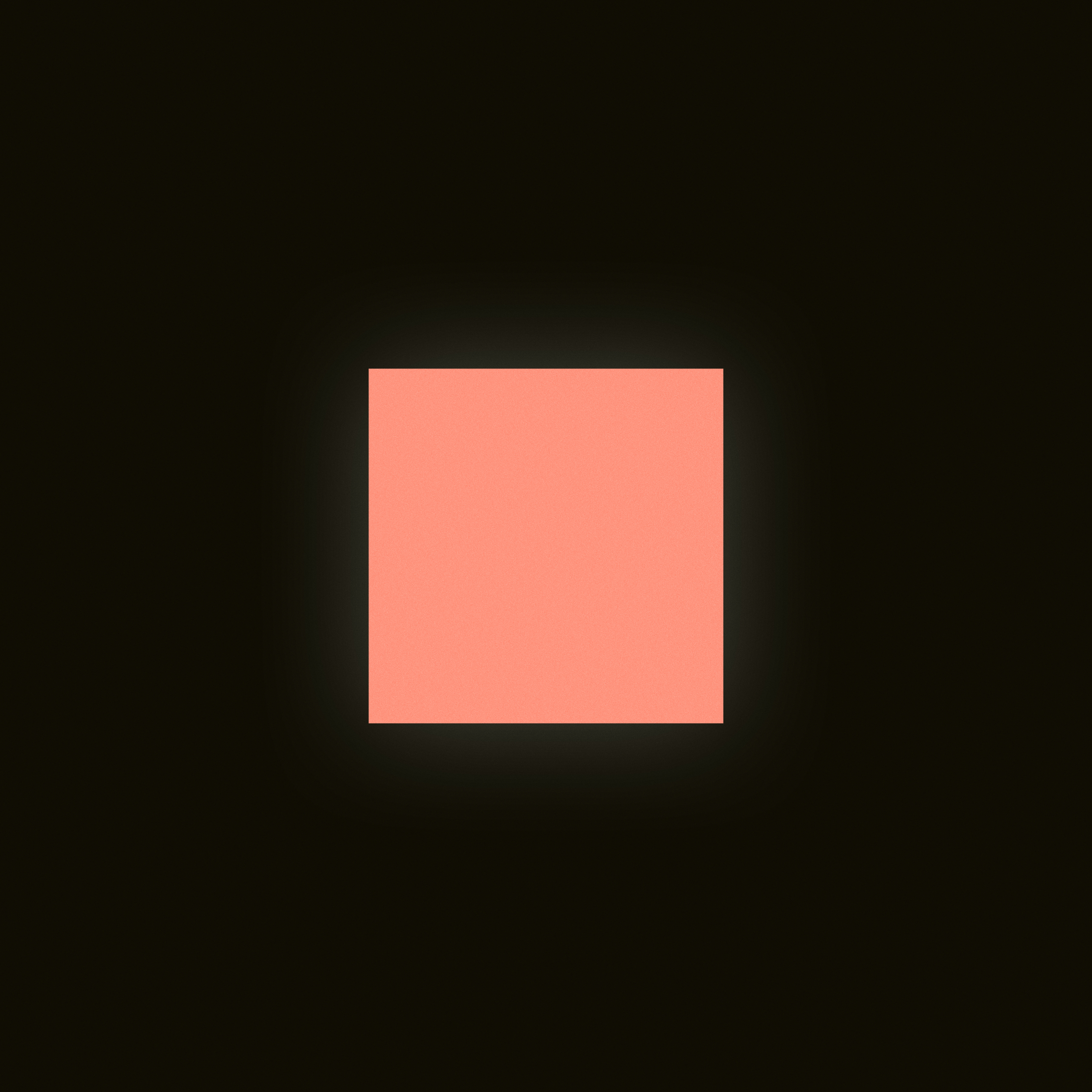

EP by Bon Iver
- Released: October 18, 2024
- Studio: April Base (Fall Creek, Wisconsin)
- Length: 12:17
- Label: Jagjaguwar
- Producers: Justin Vernon; Jim-E Stack

Bon Iver chronology
I, I (2019)	Sable (2024)	Sable, Fable (2025)

Singles from Sable
- 1. "Speyside" Released: September 20, 2024

Sable (stylized as SABLE,) is the second extended play by American indie folk band Bon Iver, released on October 18, 2024, through Jagjaguwar. Produced by Justin Vernon and Jim-E Stack, the EP marked an aesthetic shift back to the stripped-back indie folk sound of Vernon's earlier releases, For Emma, Forever Ago (2007) and Blood Bank (2009). The EP was later incorporated into Bon Iver's fifth studio album, Sable, Fable, released on April 11, 2025.

== Background ==
The three core songs that make up Sable were written by Justin Vernon between 2020 and 2023, and recorded at his April Base studio in Wisconsin, with producer Jim-E Stack. The EP's title refers to "near-blackness", with Vernon describing his "need" to share the EP as "very personal".

Regarding the decision to release an EP-length collection of music, Vernon noted: "This one really came from personal necessity. It was just time. Some of these songs have been bubbling for five years." Vernon made a conscious decision to group the three tracks together as one body of work: "They feel like an equidistant triangle, a triptych. It's three, and it couldn't be longer. It runs the gamut from accepting anxiety to accepting guilt to accepting hope. Those three things in a row. There's no room for a prologue or an epilogue at that point. Because that's it — that's what everything is."

Regarding the EP's stripped-back sound, Vernon noted: "From For Emma until i,i it felt like it was an arc, or an expansion — from One to All. i,i was very much me trying to talk about the We — the Us, outside of I. And when I got to these songs, the obvious thing was, well, people might think this is a return to something. But it really feels like a kind of raw second skin. I think about time in cylindrical, forward-moving circles. This feels like a new person, new skin. A new everything, more than a return. But I did feel like it was important to strip it down to just the bare essentials and get out of the way, to not hide with swaths of choirs. Just get it as close to the human ear as possible."

"Things Behind Things Behind Things" was debuted during a virtual broadcast by Bernie Sanders in April 2020, where Vernon and Soccer Mommy served as musical guests.

== Writing and composition ==
The track "Speyside" is named after a specific type of Scottish single malt whisky, which is brewed in the Strathspey region of the Scottish Highlands. Vernon wrote the song in early 2021, noting: "I had been living alone in the woods by myself, in Wisconsin, and it was getting dangerous. My parents had always gone down there, and I was, like, "You know what? I could just escape." I went for three or four weeks. My brother and sister-in-law also came, and then we were, like, "Oh, this is so fun, we'll stay another month." It didn't matter. They were just working from home. This was January, February of 2021, and I was reflecting a lot. The song came out mostly in its entirety. I was thinking about guilt and people in my life where I was just, like, "Oh, my God, I really did not do that right. I did not act the right way." It just came rolling out, with help from rum."

The title Sable originally appeared in the lyrics to an unreleased song from the Bon Iver, Bon Iver (2011) sessions, with Vernon describing the word as meaning: "Mourning. Deepest black. Also, a place name. But what is it? For me, I think when I'm speaking that line, what it refers to is the darkness. There have been times in my career when it has felt like I'm repeating a cycle of heartache. I was getting a lot of positive feedback for being heartbroken. And I wondered, maybe I'm pressing the bruise. Maybe I'm unknowingly steering this ship into the rocks over and over again, because . . . you know, I'm not, like, famous-on-the-street, People-magazine famous. But there have been a lot of accolades for me and my heartache. So it's me asking the question: I'm a sable, I've been a sable. Am I repeating this cycle of sorrow? Or is this just how sorrow goes, and this is how everyone feels? That's kind of what it means to me."

== Recording ==
Justin Vernon co-produced the EP with Jim-E Stack, who had previously worked with Bon Iver on the 2020 non-album singles, "PDLIF" and "AUATC". Joining Vernon on instrumentation across the EP are band member Michael Lewis on saxophone, organ and piano; regular collaborator Rob Moose on viola; Trever Hagen on trumpet and flute; Eli Teplin on synthesizer; Carter Faith and Blake Morgan on backing vocals; and pedal steel players Greg Leisz and Ben Lester.

Rob Moose, who has appeared on every Bon Iver release from Bon Iver, Bon Iver (2011) onwards, features on viola during "Speyside". Regarding their long-term collaborative relationship, Vernon noted: "We just have a language that we've built over the years. It's pretty easy for us to find what each other wants. And we're both very good at giving space to the other. Like, "O.K., I'm not sure what you mean, but let's explore that." Rob's one of my favorite collaborators, if not my favorite. Musically, what I've gotten to achieve with him is just kind of wild."

Regarding the use of pedal steel on the EP, Vernon described it as "the most beautiful musical instrument that humans have constructed" and was pleased to work with Greg Leisz on the recordings, who he had previously worked with on his second studio album, Bon Iver, Bon Iver (2011). Upon the EP's release, Vernon noted: "Greg Leisz is one of my favorite musicians to ever live, and I was very, very lucky to get to record him again. A very formative record for me was Bill Frisell's Good Dog, Happy Man. That was the first time I ever heard Greg play. There's a song on there called "That Was Then" — my high-school friends and I — we're very, very, very close — we all have it as a tattoo. The moment in which we felt the most alive and together was this little seven-, eight-second passage where Greg played this pedal steel line. It's the pinnacle of music to me. And so to get him on SABLE, is just amazing."

== Release ==
Sable was officially announced on September 20, 2024. The single "Speyside" was released the same day alongside a black-and-white music video, starring Vernon and directed by Erinn Springer, who also directed videos for "Things Behind Things Behind Things" and "Awards Season". The videos function as a 3-piece triptych.

== Critical reception ==
Professional ratings
Aggregate scores
Source	Rating
Metacritic	85/100
Review scores
Source	Rating
The A.V. Club	A−
NME	4/5 stars
Pitchfork	7.8/10

Brady Brickner-Wood of Pitchfork wrote, "In a moving suite of songs about loneliness and disappointment, Justin Vernon distills the familiar pleasures of his extraordinary oeuvre with clarity and confidence." Emma Keates of The A.V. Club wrote, "The three new tracks on SABLE [...] are the most alive Vernon has sounded in years."

== Track listing ==
Sable track listing
No.	Title	Writer(s)	Length
1.	"..."	Vernon; Phil Cook; Trever Hagen	0:12
2.	"Things Behind Things Behind Things"	Vernon; Cook; Hagen	3:20
3.	"Speyside"	Vernon; Ryan Olson; BJ Burton	3:29
4.	"Awards Season"	Vernon; Michael Lewis	5:16
Total length:			12:17

Notes

- All tracks are stylized in upper case.
- "Speyside" is stylized as "S P E Y S I D E".

== Personnel ==
- Justin Vernon – vocals, guitar, drums, bass, keyboards, production, engineering, mixing, art direction
- Greg Leisz – pedal steel
- Rob Moose – viola
- Michael Lewis – saxophone, organ, piano
- Trever Hagen – trumpet, flute
- Ben Lester – additional pedal steel
- Carter Faith – background vocals
- Blake Morgan – choral vocals
- Eli Teplin – synthesizer
- Jim-E Stack – production
- Ian Gold – engineering
- Kyle Parker Smith – assistant engineering
- Asher Weisberg – additional production, engineering, assistance
- Ryan Olson – additional production
- BJ Burton – vocal and electric guitar engineering
- Javier Martinez Cruces – engineering
- Tofer Brown – recording
- Heba Kadry – mastering
- Ruben Nusz – art direction
- Miles Johnson – art direction
