= Mk.gee =

American musician (born 1996)

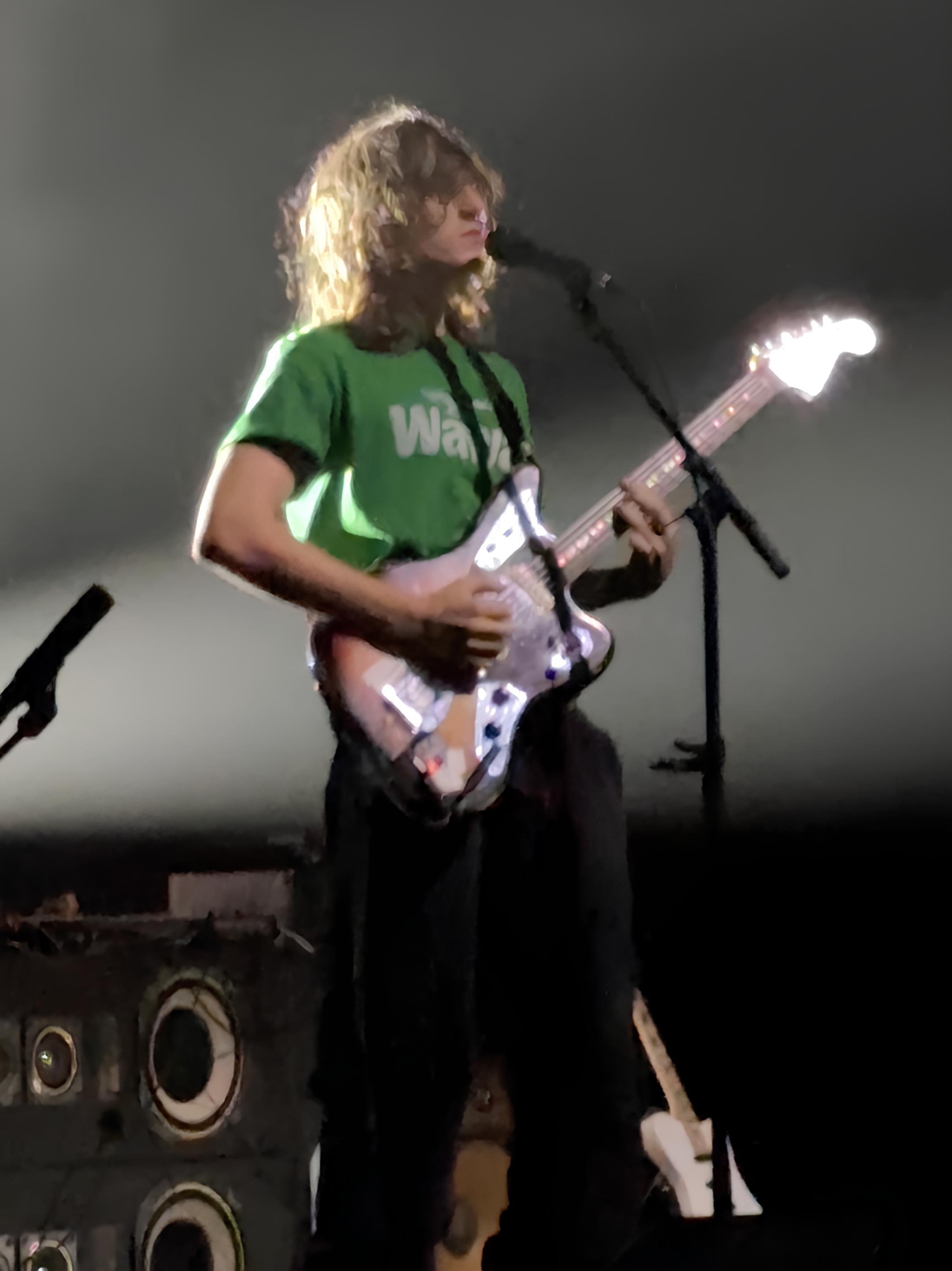
- Mk.gee performing in Dallas in 2024

Background information
- Born: Michael Todd Gordon; September 27, 1996 (age 30); Somers Point, New Jersey, U.S.
- Genres: Indie; alternative; lo-fi
- Occupations: Singer-songwriter; music producer
- Instruments: Vocals; guitar; keyboards
- Years active: 2017–present
- Labels: IAMSOUND; Interscope; Orchard Ears; R&R
- Website: mkgee.com

Michael Todd Gordon (born September 27, 1996), better known by his stage name Mk.gee, is an American singer-songwriter, music producer, and multi-instrumentalist. His career began in 2017 with the release of his debut single "I Know How You Get". In 2018, he followed up with two EPs Pronounced McGee and Fool, before releasing his debut mixtape A Museum of Contradiction in 2020. In 2024, Gordon released his debut studio album Two Star & the Dream Police. Aside from his own work, Gordon has collaborated as a songwriter and producer with various artists, including Dijon, Justin Bieber, Omar Apollo, Kacy Hill, Fred Again, Bon Iver, and 2hollis.

== Early life ==
Michael Todd Gordon was born on September 27, 1996, in Somers Point, New Jersey, to parents Maureen and Todd Gordon. He grew up in nearby Linwood, New Jersey. His interest in music began at an early age when he started taking piano lessons at the age of 6 or 7, and by 11, he started learning to play guitar. While attending Mainland Regional High School, he joined a band with some of his schoolmates. However, he preferred to play solo and began to record his own demos, playing all the instruments by himself. After graduating high school, Gordon moved to Los Angeles to study at the USC Thornton School of Music, but dropped out before graduating.

== Career ==
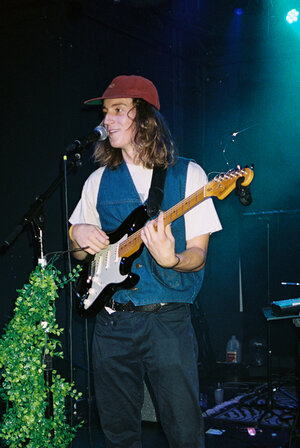
Mk.gee in 2018

=== Solo music career ===
Gordon released his debut single "I Know How You Get" in 2017, which became the lead single of his debut EP Pronounced McGee, released on May 18, 2018. The EP also featured the singles "Roll with the Punches," "Over Here," and "You". He followed this with his second EP Fool, released on November 25, 2018, led by the singles "Come On (You Know That I'm a Fool)" and "New Year".

In 2019, Gordon signed with Iamsound and Interscope Records and released the single "Untitled". That year, he also supported Omar Apollo on his The Voyager Tour and Wallows on their Nothing Happens Tour, and made his music festival debut, performing at the Pitchfork Music Festival in Paris.

On May 22, 2020, Gordon released his first mixtape A Museum of Contradiction. The mixtape was preceded by the single "cz", which was released on February 22, 2020. Rhys Buchanan, a writer from NME, praised the mixtape and gave it a four out of five stars rating, describing it as "a release that merges genres from different worlds with both maturity and ease" and noting Gordon's natural ability to balance emotional depth with musical complexity. Buchanan also called the mixtape "an important stepping stone" and predicted Gordon's rising stardom.

On February 9, 2024, Gordon released his debut album Two Star & the Dream Police, via R&R, to critical acclaim. Praised by Pitchfork as one of the best albums of the first half of the 2020s, the album was supported by five singles: "Candy", "How Many Miles", "Are You Looking Up", "You Got It", and "Dream Police". Commercially, Two Star & the Dream Police became his first charting album, peaking at number 12 on the Scottish Albums Chart and number eight on the UK Indie Albums Chart. To promote the album, Gordon embarked on a North American headline tour from April to May 2024, followed by a world tour between September and December of the same year. The concerts received praise from several publications. On May 15, 2024, he surpassed 1 million active monthly listeners on Spotify for the first time. As of September 1, 2025, Gordon has 2 million monthly listeners.

Following the debut album, Gordon has released two standalone singles: "Lonely Fight" and "Rockman". In December 2024, "Rockman" became his first charting single, entering the US Adult Alternative Airplay Chart, the US Rock & Alternative Airplay Chart, and the US Alternative Airplay Chart.

Gordon made his debut television appearances in 2024. On April 11, he performed "Are You Looking Up" on the late-night talk show Jimmy Kimmel Live! and later appeared as a musical guest on Saturday Night Live on November 9, performing the album track "Alesis" alongside "Rockman". In 2025, Gordon has performed at multiple music festivals across the United States and Europe, namely the Governors Ball, Lollapalooza, Way Out West, Øyafestivalen, Vodafone Paredes de Coura, Lowlands, Rock en Seine, and Austin City Limits festivals. In September 2026, Gordon was deemed "next up". (Note: Multiple references:)

All of Gordon's releases to date have been home-produced by himself.

=== Songwriting and producing ===
In addition to his solo work, Gordon has contributed as a songwriter and producer for several artists. He co-produced Omar Apollo's mixtape Apolonio (2020) and Dijon's debut album Absolutely (2021). He co-wrote "Mountains", performed by Charlotte Day Wilson, which was later sampled in "Fair Trade" by Drake featuring Travis Scott from the album Certified Lover Boy (2021).

In 2023, Gordon produced and co-wrote the track "Kids Are Growing Up (Part 1)" for The Kid Laroi's debut album The First Time.

In 2024, Gordon was credited as a co-writer on the tracks ".One" and ".Ten" from Fred Again's album Ten Days, which sampled his 2020 single "cz".

In 2025, he co-wrote the track "From" from Bon Iver's album Sable, Fable, and co-produced and co-wrote "Daisies" from Justin Bieber's album Swag. The latter song reached number two on the Billboard Hot 100. Gordon also contributed to Dijon's second studio album Baby, credited as a co-producer and co-writer. Collaborating again with Justin Bieber, Gordon co-produced and co-wrote "Love Song" from Bieber's album Swag II.

In 2026, Gordon was credited as a co-producer and co-writer on the track "Human After All" from 2hollis' album Pirouette.

== Artistry ==
Gordon's musical genres have been described as indie, alternative, lo-fi, experimental indie, R&B, and soft-psychedelia. His musical influences include Eric Clapton, Jimi Hendrix, Prince, Perfume Genius, Taj Mahal, The Black Keys, Sly Stone, Larry Graham, Grouper, Julianna Barwick, Pat Metheny, Lyle Mays, Eric Johnson and Down to Earth.

Gordon has been highly regarded for his technical ability, composition, and creative experimentation on the guitar, and being credited with developing an original style of instrumentation. He learned the basics of guitar from somebody who played an upright bass, recalling: "I never liked the idea of getting lessons from a guitar player, and thought it would be more useful to learn from someone who didn't play the guitar at all — someone who could give musical lessons that were more exploratory, more about trying things out."

In May 2024, when asked about modern guitarists who excite him, Clapton mentioned Gordon, commenting that he is "unique" and that "He has found things to do on the guitar that are like nobody else. [...] And he can do it live." Clapton also compared Gordon's "innovative style" to that of Prince "when [he] came on the scene".

== Equipment ==
As of 2024, Gordon's primary instrument is a Fender Jaguar which he strings as a baritone guitar with flatwound strings. This is equipped with a Roland GK-2A divided guitar MIDI pickup, which he runs through a Roland VG-8 guitar processor and synthesizer.

He tracks and performs live with a TASCAM Portastudio 424 MKI, which he uses as a preamp for its cassette-style distortion and clipping.

Gordon also uses guitar pedals such as the Chase Bliss Audio Mood MKI, Rainger FX Reverb-X, Empress Effects ParaEq MKII, DigiTech Drop, Boss CE-2W Chorus, Boss DD-20 Giga Delay, and Electro-Harmonix Hum Debugger.

== Tours ==
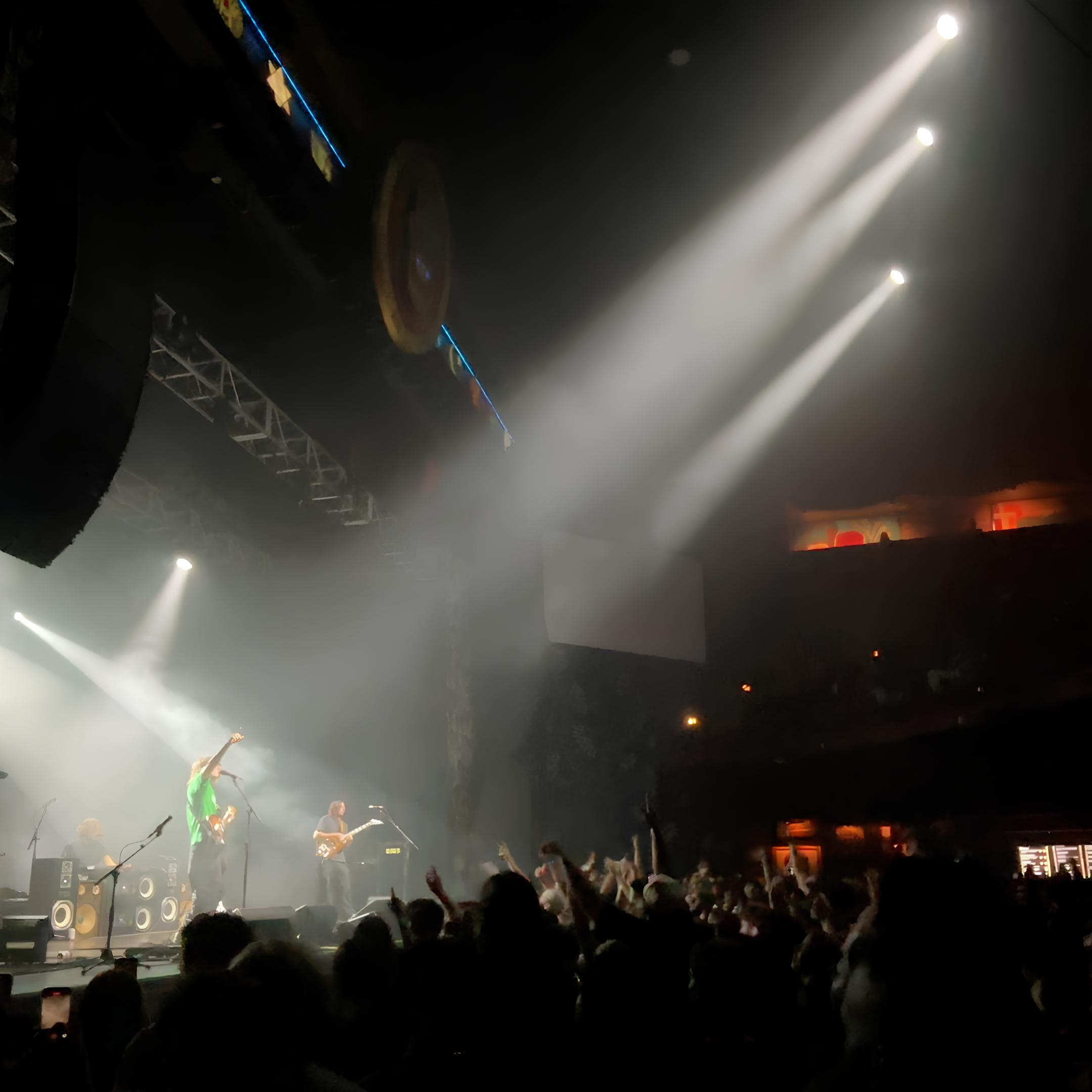
Mk.gee performing on the Two Star & the Dream Police World Tour in 2024

=== Headlining ===
- Inside Each of Us Are Two Stars Tour (2023)
- Two Star & the Dream Police North American Tour (2024)
- Two Star & the Dream Police World Tour (2024)

=== Opening ===
- Nothing Happens Tour (with Wallows) (2019)
- The Voyager Tour (with Omar Apollo) (2019)

=== Band ===
- Absolutely (with Dijon) (Spring 2022)

== Touring band members ==
- Andrew Aged – guitar (2023–present)
- Zack Sekoff – drums, bass, samples (2023–present)

== Discography ==
Mk.gee discography
- Studio albums: 1
- EPs: 2
- Mixtapes: 1
- Singles: 14

=== Albums ===
==== Studio albums ====
Title	Details	Peak chart positions	
Title	Details	SCO	UK Indie
Two Star & the Dream Police	Released: February 9, 2024; Label: R&R; Format: Digital download, streaming, LP	12	8

==== Mixtapes ====
Title	Details
A Museum of Contradiction	Released: May 22, 2020; Label: IAMSOUND, Interscope; Format: Digital download, streaming

=== Extended plays ===
Title	Details
Pronounced McGee	Released: May 18, 2018; Label: Orchard Ears; Format: Digital download, streaming
Fool	Released: November 25, 2018; Label: Orchard Ears; Format: Digital download, streaming

=== Singles ===
Title	Year	Peak chart positions			Album
Title	Year	US AAA	US Alt. Air	US Rock Air	Album
"I Know How You Get"	2017	—	—	—	Pronounced McGee
"Roll with the Punches"	2017	—	—	—	Pronounced McGee
"Over Here"	2018	—	—	—	Pronounced McGee
"You"	2018	—	—	—	Pronounced McGee
"Come On (You Know That I'm a Fool)"	2018	—	—	—	Fool
"New Year"	2018	—	—	—	Fool
"Untitled"	2019	—	—	—	Non-album single
"cz"	2020	—	—	—	A Museum of Contradiction
"Candy"	2023	—	—	—	Two Star & the Dream Police
"How Many Miles"	2023	—	—	—	Two Star & the Dream Police
"Are You Looking Up"	2023	—	—	—	Two Star & the Dream Police
"You Got It"	2023	—	—	—	Two Star & the Dream Police
"Dream Police"	2024	—	—	—	Two Star & the Dream Police
"Lonely Fight"	2024	—	—	—	Non-album singles
"Rockman"	2024	24	25	30	Non-album singles

=== Songwriting and production credits ===
Title	Year	Artist(s)	Album	Credit(s)	Ref.
"The Climb" (Miley Cyrus cover)	2019	Role Model	Non-album single	Producer	
"Hey Boy"	2020	Omar Apollo featuring Kali Uchis	Apolonio	Co-producer (with Omar Apollo and Budgie)	
"Useless"	2020	Omar Apollo	Apolonio	Co-producer (with Omar Apollo, Oscar Santander, and Albert Hammond Jr.)	
"Bi Fren"	2020	Omar Apollo	Apolonio	Co-producer (with Omar Apollo, Michael Uzowuru, and DJ Dahi)	
"Mountains"	2021	Charlotte Day Wilson	Alpha	Co-writer (with Charlotte Day Wilson, Brandon Banks, D'Mile, Babyface, Kyle Moscovitch, Marcus Reddick, Teo Halm, and Varren Wade)	
"Thank You, God. For It All."	2021	Childish Major	Thank You, God. For It All.	Co-writer (with Childish Major and Hollywood Cole)	
"Fair Trade"	2021	Drake featuring Travis Scott	Certified Lover Boy	Co-writer (with Marcus Reddick, Teo Halm, Kyla Moscovich, Brandon Banks, D'Mile, Babyface, Varren Wade, Charlotte Day Wilson, OZ, Patron, Jahaan Sweet, WondaGurl, Travis Scott, and Drake)	
"Simple, Sweet, and Smiling"	2021	Kacy Hill	Simple, Sweet, and Smiling	Co-producer (with John Carroll Kirby, Jim-E Stack, and Kacy Hill)	
"Big Mike's"	2021	Dijon	Absolutely	Co-producer (with Dijon)	
"Many Times"	2021	Dijon	Absolutely	Co-producer (with Dijon and Andrew Sarlo)	
"Noah's Highlight Reel"	2021	Dijon	Absolutely	Co-producer (with Dijon); Co-writer (with Dijon and Noah Le Gros)	
"Rodeo Clown"	2021	Dijon	Absolutely	Co-writer (with Dijon and Le Gros)	
"End of Record"	2021	Dijon	Absolutely	Co-producer (with Dijon)	
"Kids Are Growing Up (Part 1)"	2023	The Kid Laroi	The First Time	Producer; Co-writer (with The Kid Laroi)	
"White Teeth"	2023	Ryan Beatty	Calico	Co-writer (with Ryan Beatty, Ethan Gruska, Michael Uzowuru, and Carter Lang)	
".One"	2024	Fred Again	Ten Days	Co-writer (with Fred Gibson, Henry Counsell, Berwyn Du Bois, Georgie Gibson, Minnie Gibson, and Bridie Monds-Watson)	
".Ten"	2024	Fred Again	Ten Days	Co-writer (with Fred Gibson)	
"From"	2025	Bon Iver	Sable, Fable	Co-writer (with Justin Vernon, Tobias Jesso Jr., Ilsey Juber, Jacob Collier, and Jim-E Stack)	
"T00STEP"	2025	SEES00000	Non-album single	Co-producer (with Noah Ciccel and Zack Sekoff)	
"Homerun 2021"	2025	Jonah Yano	Non-album single	Co-producer and co-writer (with Jonah Yano)	
"Daisies"	2025	Justin Bieber	Swag	Co-producer (with Carter Lang, Dylan Wiggins, Eddie Benjamin, Dijon, and Daniel Chetrit); Co-writer (with Justin Bieber, Tobias Jesso Jr., Dylan Wiggins, Eddie Benjamin, Dijon, and Daniel Chetrit)	
"Another Baby!"	2025	Dijon	Baby	Co-producer (with Dijon and Andrew Sarlo)	
"Higher!"	2025	Dijon	Baby	Co-producer (with Dijon and Andrew Sarlo)	
"Yamaha"	2025	Dijon	Baby	Co-writer (with Dijon, Cara Delevingne, Carter Lang, Daniel Chetrit, Eli Teplin, and Tommy King)	
"Loyal & Marie"	2025	Dijon	Baby	Co-producer (with Dijon, Andrew Sarlo, BJ Burton, and Tommy King)	
"Kindalove"	2025	Dijon	Baby	Co-producer (with Dijon and Andrew Sarlo); Co-writer (with Dijon, Ethan Gruska, and Henry Kwapis)	
"Love Song"	2025	Justin Bieber	Swag II	Co-producer (with Carter Lang, Dijon, Dylan Wiggins, and Eddie Benjamin); Co-writer (with Justin Bieber, Carter Lang, Dijon, Dylan Wiggins, Eddie Benjamin, Daniel Chetrit, and Tobias Jesso Jr.)	
"500 Days of Summer"	2025	Guy	Non-album single	Co-producer (with Guy Hershko)	
"Banner"	2025	Andrew Aged	crown	Co-producer (with Andrew Aged); Co-lyricist (with Andrew Aged)	
"Emmaus"	2025	Andrew Aged	crown	Co-producer (with Andrew Aged and Zack Sekoff)	
"Crown for you"	2025	Andrew Aged	crown	Co-producer (with Andrew Aged, Cole MGN, and Zack Sekoff)	
"Human After All"	2026	2hollis	Pirouette	Co-producer (with Strella, and Veil); Co-lyricist (with Hollis Frazier-Herndon)	

== Awards and nominations ==
Award	Year	Category	Nominee	Result	Ref.
Libera Awards	2025	Best Breakthrough Artist	Himself	Nominated	
Libera Awards	2025	Record of the Year	"Rockman"	Nominated	
Sound of...	2025	Sound of 2025	Himself	Nominated	
