= A Museum of Contradiction =

2020 mixtape by Mk.gee

Mixtape by Mk.gee
- Released: May 22, 2020
- Length: 24:45
- Labels: Iamsound; Interscope
- Producers: Michael Gordon; Joseph Thornalley

Mk.gee chronology
Fool (2018)	A Museum of Contradiction (2020)	Two Star & the Dream Police (2024)

Singles from A Museum of Contradiction
- 1. "cz" Released: February 28, 2020

A Museum of Contradiction is the debut mixtape by American singer-songwriter, producer, and multi-instrumentalist Michael Gordon, known professionally as Mk.gee. It was released on May 22, 2020, through Iamsound and Interscope.

== Composition ==
Musically, A Museum of Contradiction has been described as a bedroom, lo-fi and psychedelic record with R&B, indie electronic, funk and dream pop elements. The mixtape has been compared to the works of Tame Impala and Thundercat.

== Critical reception ==
Rhys Buchanan of NME praised the mixtape, giving a four out of five stars rating, and wrote: "As acknowledged with the mixtape title, this release merges genres from different worlds with both maturity and ease. Mk.gee is an artist with a natural ability to pair his emotional palette with vast musicality. A release that feels like an important stepping stone – you sense stardom is looming large here."

== Track listing ==
Credits adapted from Spotify.

All tracks are written and produced by Michael Gordon, except ">;0" is written and produced by Gordon and Joseph Thornalley.

A Museum of Contradiction track listing
No.	Title	Length
1.	"Intro"	1:17
2.	"cz"	4:09
3.	"Overtime - pt 1"	4:33
4.	"Overtime - pt 2"	0:45
5.	">;0" (featuring Vegyn)	2:07
6.	"Western"	2:52
7.	"Isn't It So Convenient"	3:46
8.	"Dimeback"	3:18
9.	"Goodbye"	1:53
Total length:		24:45

== Personnel ==
Credits adapted from AllMusic.

- Michael Gordon (bass, composer, drums, guitar, keyboards, piano, synthesizer, vocals)
- Joseph Thornalley (composer, synthesizer)
- Andrew Sarlo (engineer, mixing)
- Dave Cooley (mastering)
