= How Could You Babe =

Single by Tobias Jesso Jr.

from the album Goon
- Released: January 20, 2015
- Genre: Soft rock
- Length: 3:52
- Label: True Panther Sounds
- Songwriter(s): Tobias Jesso Jr.

Tobias Jesso Jr. singles chronology
"Hollywood" (2014)	"How Could You Babe" (2015)

"How Could You Babe" is a song by Canadian singer-songwriter Tobias Jesso Jr., from his debut studio album, Goon. The song was released as a single on January 20, 2015. Rolling Stone named it one of 10 best songs of 2015.

== Track listing ==
No.	Title	Length
1.	"How Could You Babe"	3:52

== Reception ==
"How Could You Babe" received very positive reviews from contemporary music critics. The song was chosen upon release as Pitchfork Media's "Best New Track". Jeremy Gordon stated that, "The first time I listened to Tobias Jesso Jr.'s "How Could You Babe", I heard police sirens and thought they were coming from the song. Then, I hit pause and realized that was real life. But I was ready to be fooled, because it's not only Hollywood that Jesso sings about in the few songs we've heard ahead of his debut album, Goon. It's the city, vast and stupid, the bright lights and big dreams inside every window holding a story that might sound maudlin if you tried to explain. Well, Jesso isn't afraid to be maudlin." Gordon continues by saying, "There are lyrics to "How Could You Babe", but it's really pretext for Jesso to howl the title over and over again, his strangled lament perorating to something beyond words—another broken heart in the city trying to figure out where it all went wrong."
