= Goon (album) =

Studio album by Tobias Jesso Jr.
- Released: March 17, 2015
- Genres: Indie rock; baroque pop; folk rock
- Length: 46:33
- Label: True Panther Sounds
- Producers: Chet "JR" White, Ariel Rechtshaid, Patrick Carney, John Collins

Tobias Jesso Jr. chronology
Goon (2015)	Shine (2025)

Singles from Goon
- 1. "Hollywood" Released: November 17, 2014; 2. "How Could You Babe" Released: January 20, 2015

Goon is the debut studio album by Canadian singer-songwriter Tobias Jesso Jr. released on March 17, 2015 in the United States and Canada. The album was preceded by the two singles "How Could You Babe" and "Hollywood".

The album was a short-listed nominee for the 2015 Polaris Music Prize.

== Musical style ==
Jesso's music has been compared to singer/songwriters of the 1960s and 1970s from Randy Newman to Harry Nilsson and Emitt Rhodes. Even though he was a bassist and guitarist for years, his new music was written by him on the piano—an instrument he started playing at the age of 27.

== Reception ==
Professional ratings
Aggregate scores
Source	Rating
AnyDecentMusic?	7.8/10
Metacritic	81/100
Review scores
Source	Rating
AllMusic	3.5/5 stars
The A.V. Club	B+
The Daily Telegraph	4/5 stars
The Guardian	3/5 stars
Mojo	4/5 stars
NME	8/10
Pitchfork	8.5/10
Q	4/5 stars
Rolling Stone	3.5/5 stars
Spin	6/10

Goon received universal acclaim from contemporary music critics. At Metacritic, which assigns a normalized rating out of 100 to reviews from mainstream critics, the album received an average score of 81, based on 25 reviews, which indicates "universal acclaim".

Will Hermes of Rolling Stone noted "his debut LP gathers 12 beautifully lean ballads sung in a vulnerable tenor, with vintage studio touches blended by sharp producers including Chet JR White, Patrick Carney and Ariel Rechtshaid."

=== Accolades ===
Publication	Accolade	Year	Rank
Paste	50 Best Albums of 2015	2015	22
Pitchfork	The 50 Best Albums of 2015	2015	46
Rough Trade	Albums of the Year 2015	2015	18
Time Out	Best Albums of 2015	2015	8

== Track listing ==
No.	Title	Length
1.	"Can't Stop Thinking About You"	3:53
2.	"How Could You Babe"	3:52
3.	"Without You"	5:09
4.	"Can We Still Be Friends"	3:23
5.	"The Wait"	2:14
6.	"Hollywood"	6:08
7.	"For You"	3:08
8.	"Crocodile Tears"	2:22
9.	"Bad Words"	4:28
10.	"Just a Dream"	4:45
11.	"Leaving LA"	4:24
12.	"Tell the Truth"	2:47
Total length:		46:33

== Personnel ==
- Tobias Jesso Jr. – vocals, piano, guitar, bass
- Danielle Haim – drums on track 3
- Chet "JR" White – production
- Ariel Rechtshaid – production on track 1
- Patrick Carney – production
- John Collins – production
- Chris Coady – mixing
