= Leith Ross =

Canadian indie rock singer and guitarist

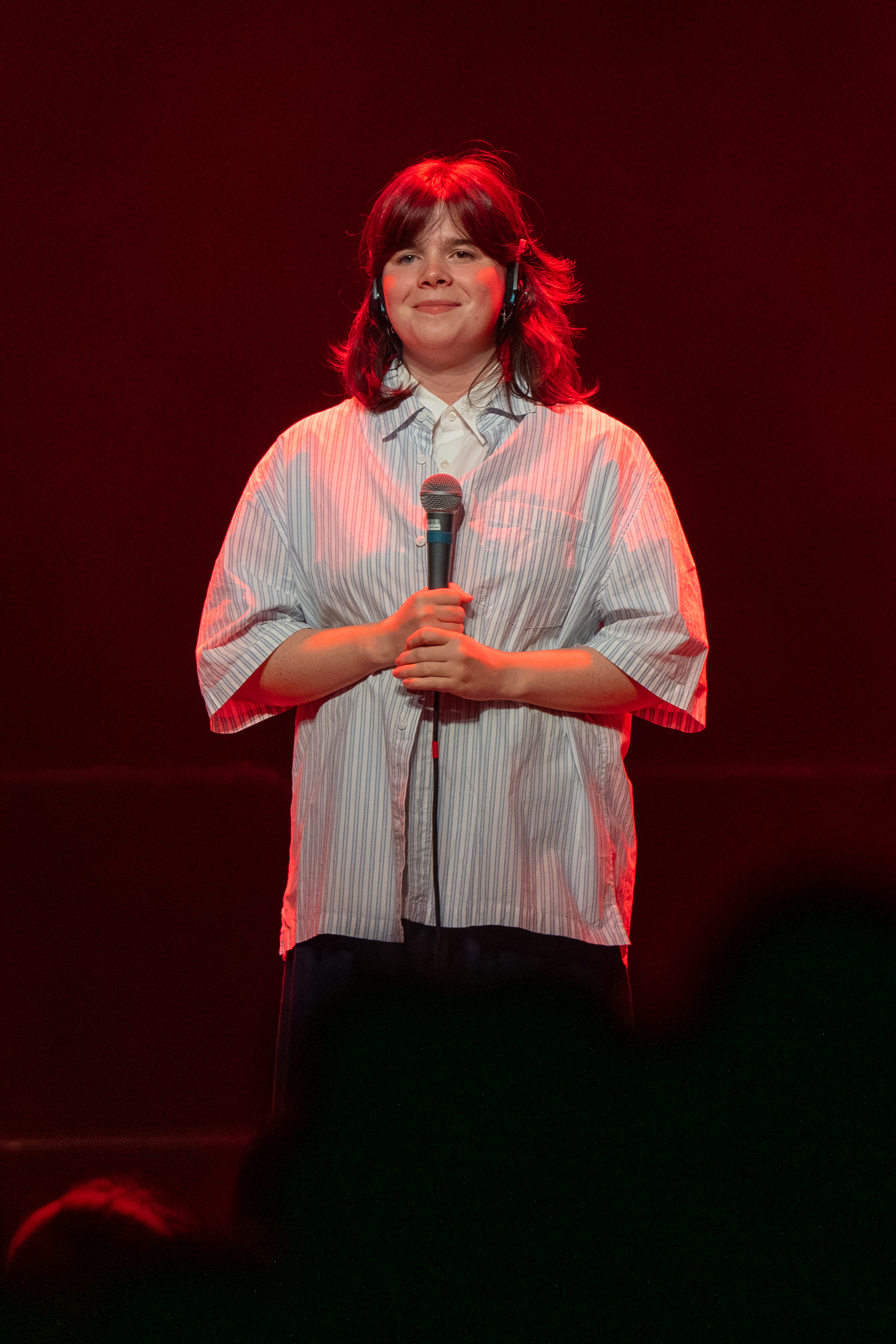

Background information
- Born: July 9, 1998 (age 27); Ottawa, Ontario, Canada
- Origin: Winnipeg, Manitoba, Canada
- Genres: Indie folk; indie pop
- Years active: 2020–present
- Labels: Interscope; Republic
- Website: leithross.com

TikTok information
- Page: leithross
- Followers: 487.9K
- Last updated: Mar. 5, 2025

Leith Ross (born July 9, 1998) is a Canadian indie rock singer-songwriter and guitarist, based in Winnipeg, Manitoba. They recorded their debut EP, Motherwell (2020), while studying at Humber College, and subsequently found success on TikTok, most prominently with the song "We'll Never Have Sex" in August 2021. In 2022, they were signed to Interscope and Republic Records. They have toured both nationally and internationally with Lord Huron, Andy Shauf, and Helena Deland, and received the inaugural John Prine Songwriter Fellowship at the 2022 Newport Folk Festival. Their debut album, To Learn, was released on May 19, 2023.

== Early life ==
Ross was raised in Manotick, Ontario, which they have described as "conservative and cut-off". They are of Scottish descent, having been named for the district of the same name in Edinburgh, and were raised Catholic. They grew up the middle child of an older brother and a younger sister and have said they were an "obnoxious and loud singing kid" as a child. Ross spent much of their teenage years online, including managing Ariana Grande and Doctor Who fan accounts on Twitter and Instagram. As a child, they were exposed to country music and to traditional Celtic music from their mother's childhood in Glasgow.

Ross wrote and performed songs from the age of 12. After finishing high school, they moved to Toronto and attended Humber College, where they pursued a degree in the school's Jazz Vocal program. Following graduation, Ross briefly moved back home before relocating to Winnipeg to pursue a music career.

== Career ==
While at Humber College, Ross wrote their debut EP, Motherwell, as a final project for their degree. They recorded the EP live in one afternoon with the help of classmates, and it was released on the indie label Birthday Cake Records in 2020. Ross' first featured performance was at Toronto's Burdock Music Hall, shortly before the COVID-19 pandemic in early 2020. In June 2021, to combat the pandemic's impact on touring and smaller artist, the collective Folk Music Canada, Ross, and Danish singer Ida Wenøe organized an album that featured rising Canadian folk artists like Ross, Jenn Grant, and The Once alongside international artists from Australia and the Nordic countries of Europe. Ross and Wenøe later jointly opened for The Bros. Landreth on the group's 2022 European tour. Unable to tour during the pandemic, Ross turned to TikTok and other social media to promote their music, joining the app in early 2021. Their first video was a cover of "Honey" by Kehlani and led We Are: The Guard to describe their voice as “delicate as dewy cobwebs.”

Ross' song "We'll Never Have Sex" went viral on TikTok in the summer of 2021, receiving over 41 million streams on Spotify. As of 2022, the audio was used nearly 40,000 times in videos by other TikTok users. Several fellow musicians praised the song, including singer-songwriter August Ponthier, who called it "a gorgeous, beautiful song that so many people can relate to", and English rock band Crawlers, who cited the lyrics as an inspiration on their own song "Fuck Me (I Didn’t Know How To Say)". Exclaim! included Ross as one of "8 Emerging Canadian Artists You Need to Hear", calling the song "gorgeously vulnerable", while Them listed it in "Our 24 Favorite Songs by LGBTQ+ Artists in 2022" and noted its particular resonance with asexual listeners. In 2022, Ross was signed to Interscope and Republic Records, and "We'll Never Have Sex" was released as a single in March. In the fall of 2022, Ross performed headline shows across North America. Throughout 2022, they supported Lord Huron in Canada and Andy Shauf and Helena Deland in Europe on tour. Ross was the recipient of the inaugural John Prine Songwriter Fellowship at the 2022 Newport Folk Festival.

In April 2023, Ross released the track, "Music Box", about which Clash wrote, "there’s a sense of precision to Leith Ross’ work which illuminates their delicate lyrical touch." Ross announced their spring 2023 headline tour dates across North America, the UK, and Europe. Ross's debut album, To Learn, was released on May 19, 2023. In September 2023, Ross played All Things Go Festival. As part of an interview coinciding with Ross's 2023 tour, NME called them "Gen Z's new favourite indie songwriter" and stated that Ross is "a voice for their generation".

To Learn received a Juno Award nomination for Alternative Album of the Year at the Juno Awards of 2024.

In June 2025, Ross announced a new album titled I Can See the Future, which was released on September 19, 2025.

== Artistry ==
Ross' music has been characterized as indie folk and has drawn comparisons to Phoebe Bridgers, Lucy Dacus, Feist, Clairo, Adrianne Lenker, Julia Jacklin, and Haley Heynderickx. They have named childhood influences including Johnny Cash, Dolly Parton, Lucinda Williams, Corinne Bailey Rae, India Arie, Hilary Duff, Avril Lavigne, Kris Kristofferson and Selena Gomez. Their music has been noted for its yearning quality and introspective lyrics that explore queerness, anxiety, sexual violence, and relationships.

== Personal life ==
Ross is non-binary, transgender, and queer, and uses they/them pronouns. They came out as gay during their first year of college and came out as transgender two years later.

== Discography ==
Leith Ross discography
- Studio albums: 2
- EPs: 1
- Singles: 11
- Music videos: 5

=== Studio albums ===
List of studio albums, with selected chart positions
Title	Details	Peak chart positions		
Title	Details	SCO	UK Sales	US Curr.
To Learn	Released: May 19, 2023; Label: Republic; Formats: CD, Vinyl, Digital	37	87	81
I Can See the Future	Released: September 19, 2025; Label: Republic; Formats: CD, Vinyl, Digital	—	—	—

=== Extended plays ===
Title	Album details
Motherwell	Released: October 16, 2020; Label: Birthday Cake; Formats: CD, digital

=== Singles ===
Title	Year	Album	Refs
"Everyone I've Never Met"	2020	Motherwell	
"Tommy"	2020	Motherwell	
"I'd Have to Think About It"	2021	Non-album single	
"We'll Never Have Sex"	2022	To Learn	
"Orlando"	2022	To Learn	
"(You) On My Arm"	2023	To Learn	
"Guts"	2023	To Learn	
"Music Box"	2023	To Learn, More	
"Grieving"	2025	I Can See the Future	
"(I Can See) The Future"	2025	I Can See the Future	
"Stay"	2025	I Can See the Future	

=== Music videos ===
Title	Year	Director
"Everyone I've Never Met"	2020	Leith Ross
"Tommy"	2020	Leith Ross
"Grown Up"	2020	Leith Ross
"We'll Never Have Sex"	2022	Leith Ross
"Orlando"	2022	Leith Ross
