= Absolutely (Dijon album) =

Studio album by Dijon
- Released: November 5, 2021
- Genre: R&B
- Length: 31:32
- Labels: R&R, Warner
- Producers: Dijon Duenas, Michael Gordon

Dijon chronology
How Do You Feel About Getting Married? (2020)	Absolutely (2021)	Baby (2025)

Singles from Absolutely
- 1. "Many Times" Released: September 17, 2021; 2. "Rodeo Clown" Released: October 22, 2021

Absolutely is the debut studio album by American musician Dijon. It was released on November 5, 2021, through R&R and Warner Records.

== Release ==
On September 17, 2021, Dijon released the lead single to the album, "Many Times." On October 13, 2021, Dijon announced the album through a live performance video of the album's first song, "Big Mike's". The album's second single, "Rodeo Clown", was released on October 22, 2021. On December 22, 2021, Dijon released a short film companion to the album.

In January 2022, Dijon performed "Big Mike's" on The Tonight Show Starring Jimmy Fallon. Dijon supported Bon Iver's 2022 tour before headlining a tour in support of the album in 2022.

== Recording ==
Dijon's Absolutely album was recorded using a special microphone that contributed a lot to the theme and the feeling of the album. It tells a story of how the album is supposed to feel. Using an omni-directional setting on his mic, Dijon stated in his interview with Reverb that every vocal except "The Dress" was recorded with an AKG C414. This type of mic created an acoustic, raw, and authentic atmosphere that would pick up every sound in the room. Also, rather than being recorded in a spacious room, the first half of the album was recorded in Dijon's spare room in Highland Park, which he described as "very boxy", helping shape and give the album an intimate sound.

== Critical reception ==
Professional ratings
Review scores
Source	Rating
Pitchfork	7.2/10

Stephen Kearse of Pitchfork praised Dijon's vocal on the album, writing that his "pliant, raspy voice guides the record, shifting from coos to wails to murmurs as he sings of love and its complications over folk and soul arrangements." Uproxx's Adrian Spinelli praised the album as a "dynamic and unpredictable display of an artist just letting go." Matthew Kent of The Line of Best wrote that the album was "plugged into his love of Americana, folk and soul while exploring different genres on every track" with "Dijon's voice and songwriting at its heart." The Fader's review described the album as sounding "alive, vibrant, joyfully imperfect."

=== Accolades ===
Publication	Accolade	Rank	Ref.
Clash	Clash Albums of the Year 2021	44	
The Fader	The 50 Best Albums of 2021	3	
The Line of Best	The Best Albums of 2021 Ranked	41	
Uproxx	The Best Albums of 2021	—N/a	

== Track listing ==
Absolutely track listing
No.	Title	Writer(s)	Producer(s)	Length
1.	"Big Mike's"	Dijon Duenas; Michael Gordon	Dijon; Mk.gee	4:24
2.	"Scratching"	Duenas		1:44
3.	"Many Times"	Duenas; Gordon; Andrew Sarlo	Dijon; Andrew Sarlo; Mk.gee	2:06
4.	"Annie"	Duenas; Jack Karaszewski	Dijon; Jack Karaszewski	1:58
5.	"Noah's Highlight Reel"	Duenas; Gordon; Noah Le Gros	Dijon; Mk.gee	3:46
6.	"The Dress"	Duenas; Le Gros; John Keuch; Sam Wilkes	Dijon	3:04
7.	"God in Wilson"	Duenas; Henry Kwapis	Dijon	2:15
8.	"Did You See It?"	Duenas		1:14
9.	"Talk Down"	Duenas; Karaszewski; Keuch; Gordon	Dijon; Karaszewski	2:31
10.	"Rodeo Clown"	Duenas; Gordon; Le Gros	Dijon	3:23
11.	"End of Record"	Duenas; Karaszewski; Keuch; Gordon	Dijon; Mk.gee	3:43
12.	"Credits!"	Duenas	Dijon	1:12
Total length:				31:32

== Personnel ==
Credits adapted from AllMusic.

- Dijon Duenas (Bass, Clarinet, Composer, Drums, Guitar, Mixing, Organ, Producer, Synthesizer, Vocals)
- God's Children (vocals)
- Michael Gordon (Bass, Composer, Drums, Guitar, Mixing, Piano, Synthesizer, Vocals)
- Noah Le Gros (Composer, Guitar, Slide Guitar, Vocals)
- Jack Karaszewski (Composer, Drum Programming, Mixing, Producer, Synthesizer)
- Fady Hanna (Keyboards)
- John Keek (Clarinet, Keyboards, Saxophone)
- John Keuch (Composer)
- Henry Kwapis (Bongos, Producer)
- Simon Lancelot (Mastering)
- Gabe Noel (Bass)
- Andrew Sarlo (Composer, Mixing, Producer, Programming)
- Sam Wilkes (Bass)
