= Tobias Jesso Jr. =

Canadian musician (born 1985)

- Born: Tobias MacDonald Jesso Jr. July 11, 1985 (age 41)
- Origin: North Vancouver, Canada
- Genres: Indie rock; baroque pop; alternative pop
- Instruments: Vocals; piano; bass; guitar
- Years active: 2014–present
- Label: True Panther Sounds
- Website: www.tobiasjessojr.com

Tobias MacDonald Jesso Jr. (born July 11, 1985) is a Canadian musician. He signed with True Panther Sounds to release his debut album Goon (2015). He was included in Rolling Stone magazine's list of the 20 Biggest Breakouts of 2015. In 2023 he was the first Songwriter of the Year recipient at the 65th Annual Grammy Awards — for his work on releases by Harry Styles, Adele, FKA Twigs, Orville Peck, King Princess, Diplo, and Omar Apollo.

== Career ==
Jesso was born in North Vancouver, British Columbia. After living and playing bass in Los Angeles for four years, Jesso moved back to his home in North Vancouver. He started playing the piano in his spare time while working for a moving company. It was during this period that he wrote his first piano-based song "Just a Dream." Eventually, he sent one of his demos in an email to former Girls bassist Chet JR White. Jesso co-wrote the songs "When We Were Young" and "Lay Me Down" (featured on the Target version of 25) with Adele, which is included in her 2015 album 25.

=== Goon ===
Jesso's first demo was released in August 2013 after a painful break-up and his mother's cancer diagnosis. Chet JR White, along with Patrick Carney of The Black Keys, John Collins of The New Pornographers, and Ariel Rechtshaid, helped produce Jesso's debut album entitled Goon. Aaron Sperske plays drums on the album except Danielle Haim plays drums on the track "Without You." His song "How Could You Babe" garnered increased attention after being tweeted about by both Adele and Alana Haim. He collaborated with Sia and Adele on the song "Alive". Originally intended for Adele and Rihanna, the song was eventually recorded by Sia and appeared on her album This Is Acting. His first major tour started in 2015.

=== Shine ===
On November 13, 2025, Jesso announced his first studio album in ten years, Shine (stylized as s h i n e), would be released the following Friday, November 21. The announcement was accompanied by the album's single, "I Love You," and a music video featuring Dakota Johnson and Riley Keough. In a press release accompanying the announcement, Jesso noted that the album was about "himself, his mom, his son, a breakup and his life at this moment in time."

== Musical style ==
Jesso's music has been compared to singer-songwriters of the 1960s and 1970s from Randy Newman to Harry Nilsson and Emitt Rhodes. He cites Newman as one of his favourite artists. Even though he was a bassist and guitarist for years, his new music was written by him on the piano—an instrument he started playing at the age of 27.

== Awards ==
Jesso was nominated for Songwriter of the Year at the 2016 Juno Awards. On June 20, 2016, Jesso was the recipient of the SOCAN Breakout Award at the SOCAN Awards in Toronto. He won the Grammy for Songwriter of the Year, Non-Classical, in 2023. Goon was Short Listed for the Polaris Prize in 2015.

== Personal life ==
Jesso married Australian musician Emma Louise in January 2019; they have one child together. They divorced in 2022.

== Discography ==
List of albums
Title	Album details
Goon	Release: March 17, 2015; Label: True Panther Sounds; Formats: CD, LP, digital download
Shine	Release: November 21, 2025; Label: R&R

=== Singles ===
- "True Love"
- "Hollywood"
- "How Could You Babe"
- "I Love You"

== Songwriting and production credits ==
Title	Year	Artist(s)	Album	Credits	Written with	Produced with
"Alive"	2015	Sia	This Is Acting	Co-writer	Sia Furler, Adele Adkins	—N/a
"When We Were Young"	2015	Adele	25	Co-writer	Adele Adkins	—N/a
"Lay Me Down"	2015	Adele	25	Co-writer	Adele Adkins	—N/a
"Roses"	2016	Shawn Mendes	Illuminate	Co-writer	Shawn Mendes, Thomas Hull	—N/a
"How Do We Make It"	2016	Jarryd James	High EP	Producer	—N/a	Jarryd James
"Same Old Story"	2016	John Legend	Darkness and Light	Co-writer	John Stephens, Blake Mills	—N/a
"Marching into the Dark"	2016	John Legend	Darkness and Light	Co-writer	John Stephens, Blake Mills	—N/a
"Slow Hands"	2017	Niall Horan	Flicker	Co-writer	Niall Horan, Alexander Izquerdio, John Ryan II, Julian Bunetta, Ruth-Anne Cunningham	—N/a
"Orlando"	2017	XXXTentacion	17	Co-writer	Jahseh Onfroy	—N/a
"Ayala (Outro)"	2017	XXXTentacion	17	Producer	—N/a	XXXTentacion, John Cunningham
"You Get My Love"	2017	Pink	Beautiful Trauma	Co-writer/Producer	Alecia Moore	Pink
"Still Around"	2017	Paloma Faith	The Architect	Co-writer	Paloma Faith, Christopher Stracey	—N/a
"If You Leave Me Now" (featuring Boyz II Men)	2018	Charlie Puth	Voicenotes	Co-writer	Charles Puth Jr., Robin Wiley	—N/a
"Hunger"	2018	Florence and the Machine	High as Hope	Co-writer	Florence Welch, Emile Haynie, Thomas Bartlett	—N/a
"Grace"	2018	Florence and the Machine	High as Hope	Co-writer	Florence Welch, Emile Haynie, Sampha Sisay	—N/a
"The End of Love"	2018	Florence and the Machine	High as Hope	Co-writer/Co-producer	Florence Welch	Emile Haynie, Florence Welch
"Bruised Fruit"	2018	St. Paul & The Broken Bones	Young Sick Camellia	Co-writer	St. Paul & The Broken Bones, Jack Splash	—N/a
"Not Thinkin' About You"	2018	Ruel	Ready	Co-writer	Lary Darnell Griffin Jr., Mark Landon, Ruel Vincent Van Dijk, Samuel Elliot Roman	—N/a
"Wish You Well"	2018	Emma Louise	Lilac Everything	Producer	—N/a	None
"Mexico"	2018	Emma Louise	Lilac Everything	Producer	—N/a	None
"Falling Apart"	2018	Emma Louise	Lilac Everything	Producer	—N/a	None
"Just the Way I Am"	2018	Emma Louise	Lilac Everything	Producer	—N/a	None
"Never Making Plans Again"	2018	Emma Louise	Lilac Everything	Producer	—N/a	None
"Gentleman"	2018	Emma Louise	Lilac Everything	Producer	—N/a	None
"Shadowman"	2018	Emma Louise	Lilac Everything	Producer	—N/a	None
"Solitude"	2018	Emma Louise	Lilac Everything	Producer	—N/a	None
"A Book Left Open in a Wild Field of Flowers"	2018	Emma Louise	Lilac Everything	Producer	—N/a	None
"When It Comes to You"	2018	Emma Louise	Lilac Everything	Producer	—N/a	None
"Malibu Nights"	2018	LANY	Malibu Nights	Co-writer	Paul Klein	—N/a
"Reasons"	2018	Cautious Clay	Table of Context EP	Co-writer	Joshua Karpeh, Ross Birchard	—N/a
"Unsaid"	2019	Ruel	Free Time	Co-writer	Peter Harding, Mark Landon, Ruel Vincent Van Dijk, Spencer Stewart	—N/a
"BRKN"	2019	Madison Ward	Beyond Me	Co-writer	Madison Ryann Ward	—N/a
"Hallelujah"	2019	Haim	Women in Music Pt. III	Co-writer	Danielle Haim, Alana Haim, Este Haim	—N/a
"Nice to Meet Ya"	2020	Niall Horan	Heartbreak Weather	Co-writer	Niall Horan, Ruth-Anne Cunningham, Julian Bunetta	—N/a
"San Francisco"	2020	Niall Horan	Heartbreak Weather	Co-writer/Co-producer	Niall Horan, Ruth-Anne Cunningham, Julian Bunetta	Julian Bunetta, Teddy Geiger
"Bend the Rules"	2020	Niall Horan	Heartbreak Weather	Co-writer	Niall Horan, Julian Bunetta, John Ryan	—N/a
"Nothing"	2020	Niall Horan	Heartbreak Weather	Co-writer/Co-producer	Niall Horan, Julian Bunetta, John Ryan	Julian Bunetta, Jeff Gunnell
"No Judgement"	2020	Niall Horan	Heartbreak Weather	Co-writer/Co-producer	Niall Horan, Julian Bunetta, Alexander Izquierdo, John Ryan	Julian Bunetta
"Woman"	2020	Ellie Goulding	Brightest Blue	Co-writer	Ellie Goulding, Eli Teplin, Christopher Stacey	—N/a
"Brush Fire"	2020	Gracie Abrams	Non-album single	Co-writer	Gracie Abrams, Blake Slatkin	—N/a
"Pain"	2020	King Princess	Non-album single	Co-writer	Mikaela Straus, Nick Long, Shawn Everett	—N/a
"Intro"	2020	Shawn Mendes	Wonder	Co-writer	Kurtis McKenzie, Adam King Feeney, Scott Harris, Shawn Mendes	—N/a
"Always Been You"	2020	Shawn Mendes	Wonder	Co-writer	Scott Harris, Shawn Mendes, Zubin Thakkar	—N/a
"Overdrive"	2021	Conan Gray	Non-album single	Co-writer/Co-producer	Christopher John Stracey, Conan Gray, Jordan K. Johnson, Oliver Peterhof, Stefan Johnson	The Monsters & Strangerz, Chris Stracey
"Kansas"	2021	Ashe	Ashlyn	Co-writer	Ashlyn Willson, Leroy Clampitt	—N/a
"Whoa"	2021	Cautious Clay	Deadpan Love	Co-writer	Cautious Clay, Christopher John Stracey	—N/a
"Shook"	2021	Cautious Clay	Deadpan Love	Co-writer	Cautious Clay, Nolan Lambroza	—N/a
"To Be Loved"	2021	Adele	30	Co-writer	Adele Adkins	—N/a
"Can I Get It"	2021	Adele	30	Co-writer	Max Martin, Adele Adkins, Shellback	
"Somewhere"	2021	LANY	gg bb xx	Co-writer	Paul Klein	—N/a
"I Die First"	2021	LANY	gg bb xx	Co-writer	Paul Klein	—N/a
"Tom Brady"	2021	Amy Allen	AWW!	Co-writer/Co-producer	Amy Allen, Andrew Haas, Ian Franzino	Amy Allen, Afterhrs
"Unsatisfied"	2021	Amy Allen	AWW!	Co-writer/Co-producer	Amy Allen, Andrew Haas, Ian Franzino	Amy Allen, Afterhrs
"Which Way" (featuring Dystopia)	2022	FKA twigs	Caprisongs	Co-writer	FKA twigs, Mike Dean	—N/a
"Careless" (featuring Daniel Caesar)	2022	FKA twigs	Caprisongs	Co-writer	FKA twigs, Simon Christiansen, Daniel Caesar	—N/a
"Thank You Song"	2022	FKA twigs	Caprisongs	Co-writer	FKA twigs, Alejandra Ghersi	—N/a
"C'mon Baby, Cry"	2022	Orville Peck	Bronco	Co-writer	Christopher Stracey, Orville Peck	—N/a
"The Curse of the Blackened Eye"	2022	Orville Peck	Bronco	Co-writer	Christopher Stracey, Orville Peck	—N/a
"Let You Go"	2022	Diplo	Diplo	Co-writer	Matthew Phelan, Naji Kareem Lomax, Teisha Matthews, Thomas Wesley Pentz	—N/a
"No Good Reason"	2022	Omar Apollo	Ivory	Co-writer/Co-producer	Omar Velasco, Kevin Rhomberg, Carter Lang	Carter Lang, Knox Fortune, Omar Apollo
"Boyfriends"	2022	Harry Styles	Harry's House	Co-writer	Harry Styles, Kid Harpoon, Tyler Johnson	—N/a
"Dotted Lines"	2022	King Princess	Hold On Baby	Co-writer/Co-producer	Amy Allen, Dave Hamelin, Mikaela Straus, Shawn Everett	King Princess, Shawn Everett
"Dangerous"	2022	Madison Beer	Silence Between Songs	Co-writer	Jeremy Dussoliet, Leroy Clampitt, Madison Beer, Tim Sommers	—N/a
"Better Angels"	2022	Marcus Mumford	(self-titled)	Co-writer	Blake Mills, Marcus Mumford, Robin Pecknold	—N/a
"How I'm Feeling Now"	2023	Lewis Capaldi	Broken by Desire to be Heavenly Sent	Co-writer	Lewis Capaldi, TMS	—N/a
"Heaven"	2023	Niall Horan	The Show	Co-writer	Niall Horan, Joel Little, John Ryan	—N/a
"Thousand Miles" (Featuring Brandi Carlile)	2023	Miley Cyrus	Endless Summer Vacation	Co-writer	Miley Cyrus, Mike Will Made It, Bibi Bourelly,	—N/a
"Wildcard"	2023	Miley Cyrus	Endless Summer Vacation	Co-writer	Miley Cyrus, Kid Harpoon, Tyler Johnson	—N/a
"Always"	2023	Daniel Caesar	Never Enough	Co-writer	Ashton Simmonds, Justin Lucas, Sir Nolan	—N/a
"Champ" (Featuring Edgar Winter)	2023	Portugal. The Man	Chris Black Changed My Life	Co-writer	Casey Bates, Edgar Winter, Homer Steinweiss, Jason Sechrist, Jeff Bhasker, John Gourley, Kyle O'Quin, Zoe Manville	—N/a
"Are You Awake?"	2023	Lauren Mayberry	Non-album single	Co-writer	Lauren Mayberry, Matthew Koma	—N/a
"Houdini"	2023	Dua Lipa	Radical Optimism	Co-writer	Dua Lipa, Caroline Ailin, Danny L Harle, Kevin Parker	—N/a
"Training Season"	2024	Dua Lipa	Radical Optimism	Co-writer	Dua Lipa, Caroline Ailin, Danny L Harle, Kevin Parker, Martina Sorbara, Nick Gale, Shaun Frank, Steve Francis Richard Mastroianni, Yaakov Gruzman	—N/a
"Illusion"	2024	Dua Lipa	Radical Optimism	Co-writer	Dua Lipa, Caroline Ailin, Danny L Harle, Kevin Parker	—N/a
"End Of An Era"	2024	Dua Lipa	Radical Optimism	Co-writer	Dua Lipa, Caroline Ailin, Danny L Harle, Kevin Parker	—N/a
"French Exit"	2024	Dua Lipa	Radical Optimism	Co-writer	Dua Lipa, Caroline Ailin, Danny L Harle, Kevin Parker	—N/a
"Happy for You"	2024	Dua Lipa	Radical Optimism	Co-writer	Dua Lipa, Caroline Ailin, Danny L Harle, Kevin Parker	—N/a
"Anything for Love"	2024	Dua Lipa	Radical Optimism	Co-writer	Dua Lipa, Caroline Ailin, Danny L Harle, Ian Kirkpatrick, Julia Michaels	—N/a
"Miénteme"	2024	Orville Peck with Bu Cuarón	Stampede: Vol. 1	Co-writer	Amiel Gonzales, Bu Cuaron, Christopher Stracey, Orville Peck	—N/a
"push me over"	2024	Maren Morris	Intermission	Co-writer	Catherine Hope Gavin, Josette Maskin, Maren Morris, Naomi McPherson	—N/a
"to love me"	2024	Amy Allen	Non-album single	Co-writer	Amy Allen	—N/a
"Come Show Me"	2024	Camila Cabello	C,XOXO- Magic City Edition	Co-writer	Camila Cabello, Jasper Harris, Morris Anthony Harper, Pablo Diaz-Reixa	—N/a
"Relationships"	2025	Haim	I quit	Co-Writer	Alana Haim, Ariel Rechtshaid, Buddy Ross, Danielle Haim, Este Haim, Rostam Batmanglij	-
"Take Me Back"	2025	Haim	I quit	Co-Writer	Alana Haim, Danielle Haim, Este Haim	-
"Cry"	2025	Haim	I quit	Co-Writer	Alana Haim, Danielle Haim, Este Haim, Rostam Batmanglij	-
"From"	2025	Bon Iver	Sable, Fable	Co-Writer	Ilsey Juber, Jacob Collier, James Stack, Justin Vernon, Michael Gordon	—N/a
"cry in the car"	2025	Maren Morris	D R E A M S I C L E	Co-Writer	Josette Maskin, Maren Morris, Naomi McPherson	-
"too good"	2025	Maren Morris	D R E A M S I C L E	Co-Writer	Maren Morris, Joel Little	-
"running"	2025	Maren Morris	D R E A M S I C L E	Co-Writer	Maren Morris, Naomi McPherson	-
"Golden Burning Sun"	2025	Miley Cyrus	Something Beautiful	Co-Writer	Bibi Bourelly, Jonathan Rado, Michael Pollack, Miley Cyrus, Shawn Everett	—N/a
"Hachikō"	2025	Fujii Kaze	Prema	Co-Writer	Fujii Kaze	—N/a
"All I Can Take"	2025	Justin Bieber	Swag	Co-Writer	Justin Bieber, Carter Lang, Dylan Wiggins, Eddie Benjamin, Daniel Chetrit, Jackson Morgan	-
"Daises"	2025	Justin Bieber	Swag	Co-Writer	Bieber, Michael Gordon, Lang, Wiggins, Benjamin, Dijon Duenas, Chetrit	-
"Go Baby"	2025	Justin Bieber	Swag	Co-Writer	Bieber, Lang, Wiggins, Benjamin, Eli Teplin, Morgan, Chetrit	-
"Butterflies"	2025	Justin Bieber	Swag	Co-Writer	Bieber, Lang, Wiggins, Benjamin, Chetrit, Morgan	-
"Way It Is" (with Gunna)	2025	Justin Bieber	Swag	Co-Writer	Bieber, Sergio Kitchens, Lang, Wiggins, Benjamin, Morgan, Chetrit	-
"First Place"	2025	Justin Bieber	Swag	Co-Writer	Bieber, Kevin Rhomberg, Lang, Wiggins, Benjamin, Morgan, Chetrit	-
"Walking Away"	2025	Justin Bieber	Swag	Co-Writer	Bieber, Lang, Wiggins, Morgan, Chetrit	-
"Sweet Spot" (with Sexyy Red)	2025	Justin Bieber	Swag	Co-Writer	Bieber, Janae Wherry, Lang, Wiggins, Benjamin, Morgan, Chetrit, James Harris III, Terry Lewis, Elmer Bernstein	-
"405"	2025	Justin Bieber	Swag	Co-Writer	Bieber, Lang, Wiggins, Benjamin, Morgan, Chetrit	-
"Too Long"	2025	Justin Bieber	Swag	Co-Writer	Bieber, Lang, Wiggins, Benjamin, Bernard Harvey, Morgan, Chetrit	-
"Adderall"	2025	Elio	autonomy	Co-Writer	Carrie K, Charlotte Grace Victoria Lee, Emily Rose Persich	-
"Made For Me"	2025	Myles Smith	A Minute, A Moment...	Co-Writer	Myles Smith, Andrew Wells	-
"Someone New"	2025	Myles Smith	A Minute, A Moment...	Co-Writer	Myles Smith, Andrew Wells	-
"Something Inbetween"	2025	Olivia Dean	The Art of Loving	Co-Writer	Olivia Dean, Nolan Lambroza	-
"Man I Need"	2025	Olivia Dean	The Art of Loving	Co-Writer	Olivia Dean, Zach Nahome	-
"Baby!"	2025	Dijon	Baby	Co-Writer	Dijon Duenas, Buddy Ross, Henry Kwapis	-
"Another Baby!"	2025	Dijon	Baby	Co-Writer	Dijon Duenas, Henry Kwapis, Ryan Richter	-
"loyal & marie"	2025	Dijon	Baby	Co-Writer	Dijon Duenas, Henry Kwapis	-
"Speed Demon"	2025	Justin Bieber	Swag II	Co-Writer	Bieber, Lang, Benjamin, Wiggins, Chetrit, Morgan	-
"Better Man"	2025	Justin Bieber	Swag II	Co-Writer	Bieber, Dijon, Lang, Ross, Wiggins, Benjamin, Chetrit	-
"Love Song"	2025	Justin Bieber	Swag II	Co-Writer	Bieber, Mk.gee, Dijon, Lang, Benjamin, Wiggins, Chetrit	-
"I Do"	2025	Justin Bieber	Swag II	Co-Writer	Bieber, Lang, Benjamin, Wiggins, Chetrit, Morgan	-
"I Think You're Special" (with Tems)	2025	Justin Bieber	Swag II	Co-Writer	Bieber, Lang, Benjamin, Wiggins, Chetrit, Morgan, Fauntleroy, Temilade Openiyi	-
"Mother In You"	2025	Justin Bieber	Swag II	Co-Writer	Bieber, Lang, Benjamin, Wiggins, Chetrit, Morgan, Teplin	-
"Witchya"	2025	Justin Bieber	Swag II	Co-Writer	Bieber, Dijon, Lang, Benjamin, Wiggins, Chetrit	-
"Bad Honey"	2025	Justin Bieber	Swag II	Co-Writer	Bieber, Dijon, Lang, Benjamin, Wiggins, Chetrit	-
"Need It"	2025	Justin Bieber	Swag II	Co-Writer	Bieber, Dijon, Lang, Benjamin, Wiggins, Chetrit, Morgan, Openiyi	-
"Oh Man"	2025	Justin Bieber	Swag II	Co-Writer	Bieber, Dijon, Lang, Wiggins, Chetrit	-
"All The Way"	2025	Justin Bieber	Swag II	Co-Writer	Bieber, Lang, Benjamin, Wiggins, Chetrit, Morgan, Miller, Camper	-
"Petting Zoo"	2025	Justin Bieber	Swag II	Co-Writer	Bieber, Lang, Benjamin, Wiggins, Chetrit, Morgan	-
"Moving Fast"	2025	Justin Bieber	Swag II	Co-Writer	Bieber, Lang, Chetrit, Morgan	-
"Open Up Your Heart" (with Eddie Benjamin)	2025	Justin Bieber	Swag II	Co-Writer	Bieber, Lang, Benjamin, Wiggins, Chetrit, Morgan, Miller, Teplin	-
"When It's Over"	2025	Justin Bieber	Swag II	Co-Writer	Bieber, Lang, Benjamin, Wiggins, Chetrit, Morgan	-
"Everything Hallelujah"	2025	Justin Bieber	Swag II	Co-Writer	Bieber, Lang, Benjamin, Wiggins, Chetrit, Morgan, Teplin	-
"Not What's Going On"	2025	Ruel	Kicking My Feet	Co-Writer	John Ryan, Ruel Vincent Van Dijk	-
"Reach You"	2025	Portugal. The Man	from Netflix's Nobody Wants This Season 2	Co-Writer	Jeff Bhasker, Benjamin Ruttner, Homer Steinweiss, James Patterson, John Gourley, John Ryan, Steph Jones	—N/a
"La Yugular"	2025	Rosalía	Lux	Co-Writer	Rosalía, Dylan Wiggins, Elliott Kozel, Noah Goldstein	—N/a
"The Day That I Die"	2025	Lewis Capaldi	Survive	Co-Writer	Amy Allen, John Ryan, Lewis Capaldi	—N/a
"By Now"	2025	Elmiene	Heat The Streets Some Mo'	Co-Writer	Elmiene, Jeff "Getty" Gitelman, Kid Harpoon	—N/a
"My Mouth Is Lonely For You"	2026	Anne Hathaway	Mother Mary: Greatest Hits	Co-Writer, Composer, Producer	Tahliah Debrett Barnett, Lewis John Aelwyn Roberts, Matteo Chiarenza Santini, Jeffrey Nath Bhasker, John Michael Rouchell	-
"Friends (2021)"	2026	Jeremy Zucker	Archive_001	Co-Writer	Jeremy Scott Zucker	-
