= I Can See the Future =

Studio album by Leith Ross
- Released: September 19, 2025
- Studio: Matsor Projects (Los Angeles); Valentine Recording (North Hollywood); Ailfionn Recording (Dublin); Better Daze (Winnipeg) (Note: Banjo on "Grieving")
- Length: 48:33
- Label: Republic
- Producer: Rostam Batmanglij

Leith Ross chronology
| To Learn (2023) | I Can See the Future (2025) |

Singles from I Can See the Future
- 1. "Grieving" Released: May 2, 2025; 2. "(I Can See) The Future" Released: June 27, 2025; 3. "Stay" Released: August 18, 2025

I Can See the Future is the second studio album by Canadian indie rock singer-songwriter Leith Ross. It was released on September 19, 2025, via Republic Records in LP, CD and digital formats.

== Background ==
The album was preceded by Ross' debut 2023 release, To Learn. It was produced by American producer Rostam Batmanglij. The title track was released as a single on June 27, 2025. It was followed by "Stay", which was released on August 18, 2025, as the second single.

== Reception ==
Professional ratings
Review scores
| Source | Rating |
|---|---|
| Clash | 8/10 |
| Exclaim! | 7/10 |

In a review for Clash with a rating of eight, Gabby Ofo noted the reason the album "resonate is not just its sonic palette but its sense of conviction", praising Ross' "fragile but unwavering" voice and describing the project as "an album that feels both diaristic and expansive, rooted in the personal yet reaching outward towards something communal."

The album received a rating score of seven from Canadian publication Exclaim!, whose reviewer Jordan Currie described it as "calm, quietly accepting grief as an unavoidable part of the human condition that sticks itself to all corners of life and never gets unstuck."

== Track listing ==
All tracks are written by Leith Ross.

I Can See the Future track listing
| No. | Title | Length |
|---|---|---|
| 1. | "Grieving" | 3:16 |
| 2. | "Point of View" | 4:49 |
| 3. | "Treasure" | 3:13 |
| 4. | "Stay" | 4:09 |
| 5. | "Terrified" | 5:15 |
| 6. | "Home" | 3:49 |
| 7. | "What My Love Is For" | 2:16 |
| 8. | "I Love Watching You Eat Dinner" | 2:26 |
| 9. | "I Will" | 3:25 |
| 10. | "What Are You Thinking About" | 5:10 |
| 11. | "Alone" | 3:43 |
| 12. | "Grieving (Reprise)" | 4:13 |
| 13. | "I Can See the Future" | 2:49 |
| Total length: | | 48:33 |

== Personnel ==
Personnel taken from I Can See the Future liner notes.

=== Musicians ===
- Leith Ross – vocals (all tracks); acoustic guitar (1, 2, 5, 9, 10, 12, 13); piano (3, 6); baritone acoustic guitar (4, 8, 11); Yamaha DX7 (5); nylon-string guitar (7, 9); Hammond organ (10); Solaris (11)
- Rostam Batmanglij – programming (1, 3, 5–8, 13); bass (1, 2, 4–8, 11, 13); drums (1, 10, 11); percussion (1, 3); octave mandolin (1, 13); keyboards (1); electric guitar (2, 4, 5, 11, 13); shaker (2, 4, 5, 9, 13); acoustic guitar (2, 11–13); 12-string acoustic guitar (2, 5, 13); mandolin, nylon-string guitar (2, 13); piano (2–11), Hammond organ (2, 4, 9), Roland Juno-60 (2–6, 11–13); baritone acoustic guitar (3, 6, 11, 13); celeste (3, 6–8, 11), Mellotron (3, 7, 8), Solaris (3, 6, 11–13), Wurlitzer (3, 6); Minimoog (4, 5, 13); miniKORG (4, 11); acoustic slide guitar, claps, brushed snare drum (4); Korg Trident (5, 6, 9, 13), Oberheim OB-8, snaps (5); tambourine (5, 9); EBow (12); baritone electric guitar, electric saz (13)
- Charlie Bisharat – violin (1–3, 9)
- Julian McClanahan – mandolin, strings (1)
- Liam Duncan – banjo (1)
- Andrew Tachine – drums (2, 4, 5, 11, 13)
- Gab Strum – piano, celeste (2); synthesizer (2, 5, 6)
- Daniel Aged – pedal steel (2, 4, 6, 9, 12); upright bass (12)
- Gabe Noel – upright bass (3, 7, 9, 10); violin (3, 6–8); viola (3, 6, 7); cello (3, 8, 9)
- Méabh Mulligan – concertina (9)
- Henry Solomon – saxophone (10)
- Angel Deradoorian – additional vocals (11, 13)
- Amir Yaghmai – acoustic saz (13)
- Clarissa Bitar – oud (13)

=== Technical ===
- Rostam Batmanglij – production, engineering (all tracks); mixing (1)
- Leith Ross – co-production, design & layout
- Evan Pruett – engineering
- Joey Messina-Doerning – additional engineering (2, 4, 5, 11, 13; at Valentine Recording)
- Kyle Henderson – additional engineering (2, 4, 5, 11, 13; at Valentine Recording)
- Chris Barry – additional engineering (9; Ailfionn Recording)
- Andrew Maury – mixing, Atmos (except 1)
- Emily Lazar – mastering (all tracks); Atmos (1)
- Jackie Chojnacki – creative & art direction
- Annie Stoll – creative & art direction
- Luis Cardenas – creative & art direction
- Roberta Landreth – design & layout
