= Sable, Fable =

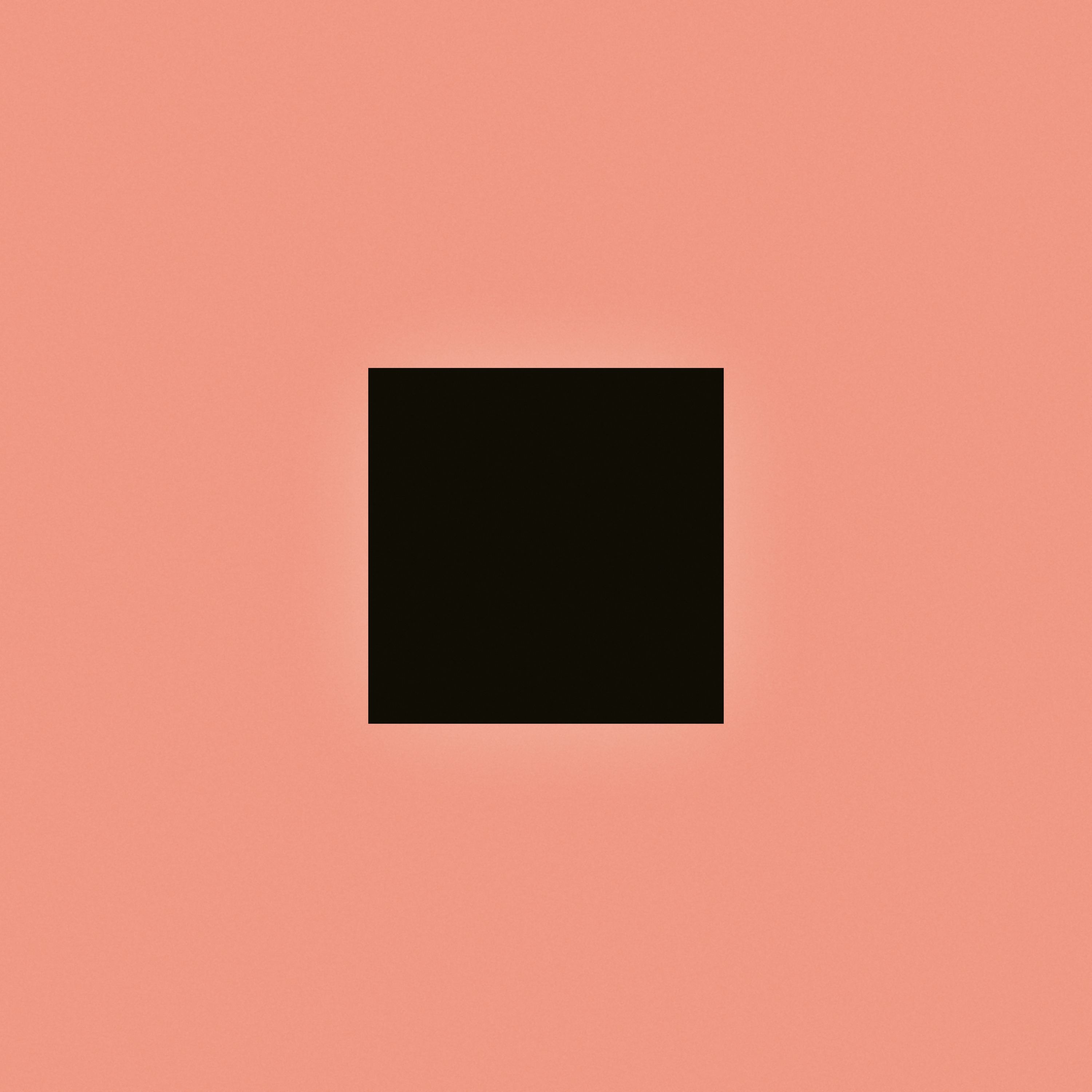

Studio album by Bon Iver
- Released: April 11, 2025
- Studios: April Base (Fall Creek, Wisconsin); Hive (Eau Claire, Wisconsin)
- Genres: R&B; soft rock; pop; soul
- Length: 41:37
- Label: Jagjaguwar
- Producers: Justin Vernon; Jim-E Stack; BJ Burton; Brian F Joseph; Samuel Tsang

Bon Iver chronology
Sable (2024)	Sable, Fable (2025)

Singles from Sable, Fable
- 1. "Everything Is Peaceful Love" Released: February 14, 2025; 2. "If Only I Could Wait" / "Walk Home" Released: March 14, 2025

Sable, Fable (stylized as SABLE, fABLE) is the fifth studio album by American indie folk band Bon Iver, released on April 11, 2025, via Jagjaguwar. The album is a continuation of the Sable EP (2024), which is included as a separate disc on vinyl. Marking the band's first album in nearly six years since I, I (2019), it features guest appearances from Dijon, Flock of Dimes, and Danielle Haim, with additional contributions from Kacy Hill, Jacob Collier and Mk.gee, among others.

Produced by Justin Vernon and Jim-E Stack, it is musically split between Bon Iver's predominantly folk-leaning output showcased on Sable and the contemporary R&B, pop and soul-leaning Fable. Its lyrics primarily concern newfound love. The album received widespread critical acclaim upon release, with critics noting its brighter soundscapes and Vernon's more straightforward approach to songwriting.

== Background and recording ==
[Sable] is the darkest black on Earth… and it rhymes with 'fable'. I think it was a look back at this kind of man-in-a-cabin narrative I've been absorbing over these years, accepting it in a way. But the rest of the record is sort of me doing whatever I needed to do to be happy, for once.

— Justin Vernon on The Tonight Show Starring Jimmy Fallon, April 2, 2025

Justin Vernon co-produced the album with Jim-E Stack, who had previously worked with Bon Iver on the 2020 non-album singles, "PDLIF" and "AUATC".

The album was primarily recorded at Vernon's April Base studio in Wisconsin after it had been inactive for years as it underwent renovation. The "conceptual genesis" for the album was on February 22, 2022, when Stack arrived at the studio with Danielle Haim, whose vocals are featured on "I'll Be There" and "If Only I Could Wait". The album's announcement billed it as "Bon Iver's next chapter: the epilogue" and described it as a "love story set to lush, radiant pop music".

== Release and promotion ==
Sable, Fable was officially announced on February 11, 2025. The first single "Everything Is Peaceful Love" was released on February 14, 2025, alongside a music video directed by filmmaker John Wilson. "If Only I Could Wait" and "Walk Home" were released as singles simultaneously on March 14, 2025.

In promotion of the album, the band announced collaborations with 31 brands, including Rough Trade East and Todd Snyder, all of which were only available on release day. A "state fair" album release party took place on April 12, a day after the album's release, at the Terasaki Budokan in Little Tokyo, Los Angeles. Multiple listening events, dubbed "Fable Spaces", were also organized on April 9 at certain locations around the world.

== Critical reception ==
Professional ratings
Aggregate scores
Source	Rating
AnyDecentMusic?	7.8/10
Metacritic	83/100
Review scores
Source	Rating
AllMusic	2.5/5 stars
The A.V. Club	A−
Clash	9/10
The Daily Telegraph	4/5 stars
DIY	5/5 stars
MusicOMH	4.5/5 stars
NME	4/5 stars
The Observer	4/5 stars
Pitchfork	8.1/10
Rolling Stone	4/5 stars

Sable, Fable received acclaim from critics. At Metacritic, which assigns a normalized rating out of 100 to reviews from mainstream critics, the album received an average score of 83, based on 24 reviews, which indicates "universal acclaim".

== Track listing ==
All tracks are produced by Justin Vernon and Jim-E Stack and additionally produced by Asher Weisberg and Ryan Olson, except where listed.

The tracks were released on two discs on vinyl. The tracks on the CD and cassette releases were not divided in the same manner.

Disc one (vinyl) – Sable track listing
No.	Title	Writer(s)	Producer(s)	Length
1.	"..."	Justin Vernon; Phil Cook; Trever Hagen	Vernon; Stack; Weisberg^{[a]}	0:12
2.	"Things Behind Things Behind Things"	Vernon; Cook; Hagen	Vernon; Stack; Weisberg^{[a]}	3:20
3.	"Speyside"	Vernon; Ryan Olson; BJ Burton	Vernon; Stack; Weisberg^{[a]}	3:29
4.	"Awards Season"	Vernon; Michael Lewis		5:16
Total length:				12:17

Disc two (vinyl) – Fable track listing
No.	Title	Writer(s)	Producer(s)	Length
1.	"Short Story"	Vernon; Stack; Eli Teplin; Kacy Hill; Weisberg		1:56
2.	"Everything Is Peaceful Love"	Vernon; Burton; Stack	Vernon; Stack; Burton; Weisberg^{[a]}; Olson^{[a]}	3:30
3.	"Walk Home"	Vernon; Stack; Teplin; Lewis		3:46
4.	"Day One" (featuring Dijon and Flock of Dimes)	Vernon; Dijon Duenas; Jenn Wasner; Burton; Ilsey Juber; Samuel Tsang	Vernon; Stack; Tsang; Weisberg^{[a]}; Olson^{[a]}	3:33
5.	"From"	Vernon; Tobias Jesso Jr.; Juber; Jacob Collier; Stack; Michael Gordon		3:03
6.	"I'll Be There"	Vernon; Danielle Haim; Weisberg; Teplin; Lewis; Stack		2:55
7.	"If Only I Could Wait" (featuring Danielle Haim)	Vernon; Stack; Haim		3:22
8.	"There's a Rhythmn"	Vernon; Sean Carey; Teplin; Stack; Juber	Vernon; Stack; Brian F Joseph^{[i]}; Weisberg^{[a]}; Olson^{[a]}	5:16
9.	"Au Revoir"	Vernon; Andrew Fitzpatrick; Carey; Matthew McCaughan; Wasner; Lewis; Chris Messina		2:02
Total length:				29:20

Notes

- "..." is only present as a separate track on digital editions. Physical editions bundle it with "Things Behind Things Behind Things" for a combined length of 3:33.
- On vinyl, "Awards Season" ends with a droning noise in the locked groove, which would normally transition into "Short Story". The same edit is included in the digital-download release of the album on Bandcamp (while at least some of the other providers retained the edit from the EP as a track of the album).
- ^{^[a]} signifies an additional producer
- ^{^[i]} signifies an initial producer
- "Awards Season" contains a sample of "Miles Away", written and performed by Phil Cook featuring Amelia Meath.

== Personnel ==
=== Sable ===
Bon Iver

- Justin Vernon – vocals, guitar, bass, engineering, mixing, drums (1, 2), keyboards (4)
- Michael Lewis – piano, organ, saxophone (4)

Additional musicians

- Greg Leisz – guitar (1, 2, 4)
- Ben Lester – guitar (1, 2)
- Trever Hagen – flute, trumpet (1, 2)
- Rob Moose – viola (3)
- Eli Teplin – synthesizer (4)
- Blake Morgan – vocals (4)
- Carter Faith – vocals (4)

Technical

- Ian Gold – engineering
- Kyle Parker Smith – additional engineering
- Asher Weisberg – additional engineering, assistance
- BJ Burton – engineering (4)
- Javier Martinez Cruces – engineering (4)
- Tofer Brown – recording (4)
- Heba Kadry – mastering

=== Fable ===
Bon Iver

- Justin Vernon – vocals (all), bass (1–6, 8), guitar (1, 2, 4, 5, 7–9), synthesizer (1, 3), keyboards (2, 5, 6, 9), samples (3, 7), Wurlitzer (4, 8), drums (5, 6), percussion (6, 8)
- Jenn Wasner – vocals (1, 3, 4, 8), synthesizer (2, 3), group improvisation (9)
- Sean Carey – vocals (1, 8), brushes (6), slab (7), drums, keyboards (8), group improvisation (9)
- Michael Lewis – piano, horns (6), slab (7), saxophone (7, 8), group improvisation (9)
- Andrew Fitzpatrick – group improvisation (9)
- Matt McCaughan – group improvisation (9)

Additional vocalists

- Kacy Hill – vocals (1)
- Blake Morgan – vocals (1, 6)
- Dijon – vocals (4)
- Alaina Rose Brown – vocals (5, 6, 8)
- Stoud – vocals (5, 6, 8)
- Joshua Brown – vocals (5, 6, 8)
- Jacob Collier – vocals (5)
- Danielle Haim – vocals (6, 7)

Additional musicians

- Jim-E Stack – drums (1–4, 6, 7), samples (3, 6, 7), programming (5), piano (9)
- Eli Teplin – piano (1, 3, 4, 6, 8), keyboards (4, 6, 8), slab (7)
- Rob Moose – violin, viola (1–3, 7, 8), arrangements (1, 2, 3)
- Alan Good Parker – guitar (1, 6)
- Rahm Silverglade – synthesizer (1)
- Asher Weisberg – granular synthesis (2), wrangling (6)
- Greg Leisz – guitar (2, 8)
- Ben Lester – guitar (2)
- BJ Burton – drums (2)
- Samuel Tsang – piano, synthesizer, programming (4)
- Cory Henry – guitar (4)
- MonoNeon – bass guitar (4, 6)
- Michael Gordon – guitar (5), piano, organ (6)
- Brian F. Joseph – drums (8)
- Chris Messina – group improvisation (9)

Technical

- Justin Vernon – engineering
- Ian Gold – engineering
- Rob Moose – engineering (1, 2, 7, 8)
- BJ Burton – engineering (2)
- Javier Martinez Cruces – engineering (4)
- Vic Steffens – engineering (5, 6, 8)
- Brian F. Joseph – initial production and engineering (8)
- Asher Weisberg – additional engineering, assistance
- Joe Richmond – additional engineering
- David Wrench – mixing (1, 6–9)
- Keiron Beardmore – mixing (2–4)
- Matt Wolach – mixing (2–4)
- Mark "Spike" Stent – mixing (2–4)
- Shawn Everett – mixing (5)
- Heba Kadry – mastering

Visual

- Justin Vernon – art direction
- Miles Johnson – art direction
- Ruben Nusz – art direction

== Charts ==
=== Weekly charts ===
Weekly chart performance for Sable, Fable
Chart (2025)	Peak position
Australian Albums (ARIA)	4
Austrian Albums (Ö3 Austria)	2
Belgian Albums (Ultratop Flanders)	3
Belgian Albums (Ultratop Wallonia)	50
Canadian Albums (Billboard)	23
Danish Albums (Hitlisten)	2
Dutch Albums (Album Top 100)	8
Finnish Albums (Suomen virallinen lista)	47
French Albums (SNEP)	78
German Albums (Offizielle Top 100)	4
Irish Albums (Official Charts)	23
Japanese Digital Albums (Oricon)	39
Japanese International Albums (Oricon)	21
New Zealand Albums (RMNZ)	5
Norwegian Albums (VG-lista)	10
Portuguese Albums (AFP)	16
Scottish Albums (Official Charts)	3
Spanish Albums (PROMUSICAE)	39
Swedish Albums (Sverigetopplistan)	4
Swiss Albums (Schweizer Hitparade)	5
UK Albums (Official Charts)	4
UK Independent Albums (Official Charts)	2
US Billboard 200	11
US Americana/Folk Albums (Billboard)	1
US Independent Albums (Billboard)	2
US Top Rock & Alternative Albums (Billboard)	1

=== Year-end charts ===
Year-end chart performance for Sable, Fable
Chart (2025)	Position
Belgian Albums (Ultratop Flanders)	165
