= Speed Demon (Justin Bieber song) =

Single by Justin Bieber

from the album Swag II
- Released: September 22, 2025
- Length: 3:31
- Label: Def Jam; ILH
- Songwriters: Justin Bieber; Eddie Benjamin; Carter Lang; Dylan Wiggins; Daniel Chetrit
- Producers: Eddie Benjamin; Carter Lang; Dylan Wiggins; Daniel Chetrit

Justin Bieber singles chronology
"Love Song" (2025)	"Speed Demon" (2025)	"Bad Honey" (2025)

Music video
- "Speed Demon" on YouTube

"Speed Demon" is a song by Canadian singer Justin Bieber. It was released through Def Jam Recordings and ILH Productions as the second single from his eighth studio album, Swag II, on September 22, 2025. Bieber wrote the song with producers Eddie Benjamin, Carter Lang, Dylan Wiggins, and Daniel Chetrit. The song was later serviced to Top 40 and Rhythmic radio stations on May 4, 2026.

== Composition and critical reception ==
"Speed Demon" is a song with a hip-hop-influenced instrumental and a groovy guitar melody. It is a bright and funky song with a humorous chorus about "checking these chickens", with Bieber also saying his viral "is it clocking to you?" meme, which came from a paparazzi altercation he had a few months before the release of the song and its parent album. Katie Hawthorne of The Guardian opined: "But for a song bragging about ambition, it lacks adrenaline – like many of Swag II's safe, repetitive tracks". Andrew Unterberger of Billboard ranked it third among the album's tracks, saying that the song "works because he's so firmly in lockstep with the groove, which evokes summery early-'90s nostalgia in the absolute best way".

== Music video ==
The music video for the song, directed by Rory Kramer, was posted on Bieber's Instagram on September 21, 2025. The music video consists of Bieber walking around singing the song on the grounds of Coachella 2026, where he was announced to perform at as one of the main headliners.

== Charts ==
Chart performance for "Speed Demon"
Chart (2025–2026)	Peak position
Australia (ARIA)	39
Canada Hot 100 (Billboard)	42
Czech Republic Airplay (ČNS IFPI)	30
Global 200 (Billboard)	71
Guatemala Anglo Airplay (Monitor Latino)	9
Ireland (IRMA)	78
Japan Hot Overseas (Billboard Japan)	7
New Zealand Hot Singles (RMNZ)	2
Norway (VG-lista)	83
Peru Anglo Airplay (Monitor Latino)	14
Sweden Heatseeker (Sverigetopplistan)	1
UK Singles (Official Charts)	51
US Billboard Hot 100	66
US Adult Pop Airplay (Billboard)	32
US Pop Airplay (Billboard)	11
US Rhythmic Airplay (Billboard)	3
Venezuela Airplay (Record Report)	69

== Certifications ==
Certifications for "Speed Demon"
Region	Certification	Certified units/sales
Brazil (Pro-Música Brasil)	Gold	20,000^{‡}
New Zealand (RMNZ)	Gold	15,000^{‡}
^{‡} Sales+streaming figures based on certification alone.

== Release history ==
Release dates and formats for "Speed Demon"
Region	Date	Format	Label(s)	Ref.
United States	May 4, 2026	Contemporary hit radio; rhythmic contemporary radio	Def Jam	
Italy	July 3, 2026	Radio airplay	Island	
