= Justin Bieber discography =

Recordings by Canadian singer

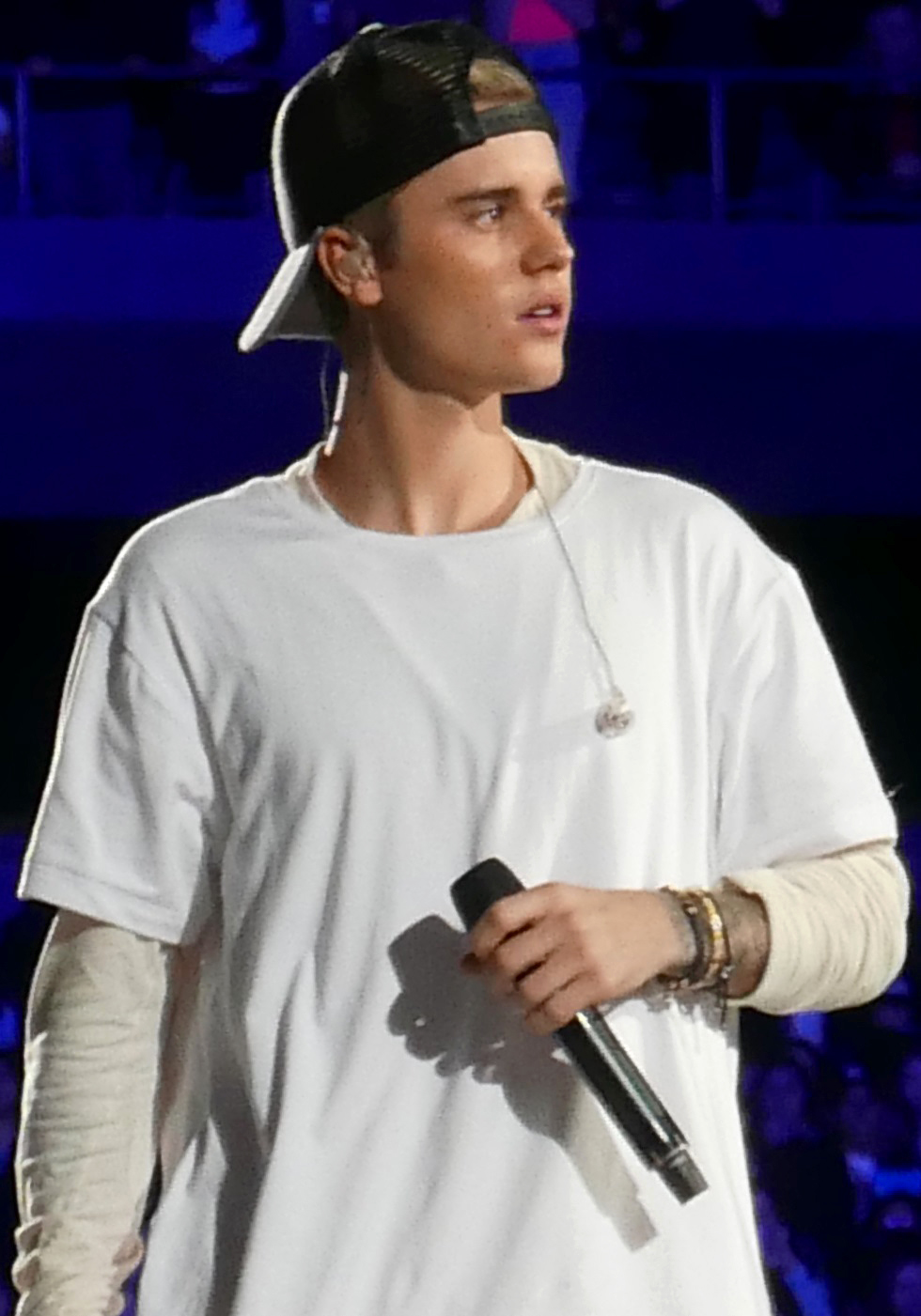
- Bieber in 2015
- Studio albums: 8
- Extended plays: 2
- Live albums: 2
- Compilation albums: 3
- Singles: 76
- Reissued albums: 1
- Remix albums: 3
- Promotional singles: 10

The Canadian singer Justin Bieber has released eight studio albums, one reissued album, three remix albums, two live albums, three compilation albums, two extended plays, 76 singles (including 22 as a featured artist), and 10 promotional singles. Bieber has attained eight number-one hits on the US Billboard Hot 100 and eight number-one albums on the US Billboard 200 charts. Internationally, Bieber has attained 16 number-one singles in Denmark; 13 in Canada; 12 in New Zealand (the most for a solo artist of all time); 9 in Australia; 8 each in the United Kingdom and Sweden; 7 each in Ireland and the Netherlands; 3 in Germany; and 2 in France. As of June 2026, Bieber has sold an estimated 150 million records worldwide, making him one of the best-selling music artists of all time. According to the Recording Industry Association of America (RIAA), he has sold 25 million albums and 128.5 million digital singles units as a lead artist, in the United States. He was named the "Greatest Pop Star of 2016" by Billboard. He was also named the Billboard Year-End Top Male Artist for 2016 and placed number seven on the magazine's Decade-End Top Artists Chart for the 2010s.

Bieber's debut single, "One Time", peaked at number 12 in Canada, and his debut extended play (EP), My World (2009), debuted at number one in Canada and reached the 5 in United Kingdom and the United States. His debut studio album, My World 2.0 (2010), topped the charts in Australia, Canada, and the United States. The album debuted at number one on the US Billboard 200, making him the youngest solo male artist to top the chart since Stevie Wonder in 1963. The album's lead single, "Baby", became one of the highest-certified digital singles, peaking at number five peak on the US Billboard Hot 100. His second remix album, Never Say Never: The Remixes, released on February 14, 2011, topped the charts in Canada and the United States, with the lead single, "Never Say Never", reaching number eight on the US Billboard Hot 100. His second studio album, Under the Mistletoe, also topped the charts in Canada and the United States, It becoming the first Christmas album by a male artist to debut at number one on the US Billboard 200, with the lead single, "Mistletoe", reaching the top 10 in Canada and Denmark, and topping the US Billboard Holiday 100 chart. His lead single of his third studio album, Believe (2012), "Boyfriend", topped the charts in Canada and reached number two in the US. The album also features the US top-10 singles—"As Long as You Love Me" and "Beauty and a Beat". His third remix album, Believe Acoustic, released on January 29, 2013, marked his fifth number-one album in Canada and the United States, making him the first artist to achieve five US number-one albums by age 18. He released his second compilation album, Journals, on December 23, 2013.

Bieber collaborated with Jack Ü on "Where Are Ü Now", which peaked at eight on the US Billboard Hot 100. His fourth studio album, Purpose, which was released on November 13, 2015, debuted atop the US Billboard 200, with first-week sales of 522,000 copies and moving a total of 649,000 equivalent album units. The lead single "What Do You Mean?", made him the youngest male soloist to debut at number one on the US Billboard Hot 100. He also released "Sorry" and "Love Yourself", making the first artist in history to occupy the entire top 3 of the UK Singles Chart. "Love Yourself" topped Billboard's Year-End Hot 100 Chart in 2016, followed by "Sorry" at number two, and made Bieber only the third artist in history to hold the top 2 positions of the Billboard Year-End Hot 100, after the Beatles in 1964 and Usher in 2004. He was featured in Major Lazer's "Cold Water", which reached number two, and DJ Snake's "Let Me Love You", which peaked at number four. In 2017, he collaborated with Luis Fonsi and Daddy Yankee on a remix of their single "Despacito", which tied the then-record for the most weeks at number one in US Billboard Hot 100. Bieber co-featured on DJ Khaled's single, "I'm the One", debuting at number one on the US Billboard Hot 100 with Bieber replacing himself at the summit with "Despacito" a week later, making him the first artist to achieve consecutive number-one singles. In 2018, he reunited with Khaled on "No Brainer", peaking at number five, and in 2019, released "I Don't Care" with Ed Sheeran, reaching number two, and "10,000 Hours" with Dan + Shay, peaking at number four, in the US.

His fifth album, Changes (2020), debuted atop on the US Billboard 200, selling 126,000 copies and earning 231,000 units total equivalent album units. Bieber became the youngest solo artist with seven number-one albums in the US, breaking Elvis's 59-year record. The album featured two top-5 singles, Yummy", and "Intentions". He also released "Stuck with U" with Ariana Grande, debuting atop on the Billboard Hot 100, followed by "Monster" with Shawn Mendes, which debuted at number 8. His sixth studio album, Justice, released on March 19, 2021, debuted atop the US Billboard 200 with 154,000 album-equivalent units, making him the youngest soloist to have eight US number-one albums, surpassing yet another record held by Elvis Presley since 1965. The album's fifth single, "Peaches", also debuted at number one, making Bieber the first male soloist to debut both an album and a single at number one in the same week. Additionally, "Holy", "Anyone", and "Ghost" also reached US top 10. He released the gospel EP Freedom on April 4, 2021, and latter collaborated with the Kid Laroi, on "Stay", his eight US number-one. Bieber then joined Wizkid on a remix of the latter's single, "Essence", in which reached number nine on the US Billboard Hot 100. His seventh studio album, Swag, released on July 11, 2025, debuted at number two on the US Billboard 200 with 163,000 units in its opening week. The album's lead single, "Daisies", also debuted at number two on the Billboard Hot 100. His eight studio album, Swag II, followed on September 5, 2025.

== Albums ==
=== Studio albums ===
List of studio albums, with selected chart positions, sales figures and certifications
Title	Album details	Peak chart positions										Sales	Certifications
Title	Album details	CAN	AUS	DEN	FRA	GER	NLD	NZ	SWE	UK	US	Sales	Certifications
My World 2.0 (Note: In certain territories, My World 2.0 was released as My Worlds (2010)—a re-release of Bieber's debut EP My World (2009) along with the tracks from My World 2.0—and thus charted in conjunction with My World.)	Released: March 19, 2010; Label: Island, Teen Island, RBMG, Schoolboy; Formats: CD, LP, digital download, streaming	1	1	7	4	7	4	1	17	3	1	US: 3,400,000	MC: 3× Platinum; ARIA: 3× Platinum; BPI: Gold; NVPI: Platinum; RIAA: 4× Platinum; RMNZ: 2× Platinum
Under the Mistletoe	Released: November 1, 2011; Label: Island, RBMG, Schoolboy; Formats: CD, digital download	1	6	2	14	18	6	7	5	13	1	US: 1,600,000	MC: 5× Platinum; ARIA: Platinum; BPI: Gold; GLF: Gold; IFPI DEN: 3× Platinum; RIAA: 2× Platinum; RMNZ: Platinum
Believe	Released: June 15, 2012; Label: Island, RBMG, Schoolboy; Formats: CD, LP, digital download	1	1	1	3	3	2	1	1	1	1	US: 1,700,000	MC: 2× Platinum; ARIA: 2× Platinum; BPI: Platinum; BVMI: Gold; GLF: Platinum; IFPI DEN: 5× Platinum; RIAA: 3× Platinum; RMNZ: 3× Platinum
Purpose	Released: November 13, 2015; Label: Def Jam, RBMG, Schoolboy; Formats: CD, CD+DVD, digital download, LP, cassette	1	1	1	8	3	1	1	1	2	1	CAN: 227,000 (Note: Canadian sales figures for Purpose as of January 2016.); US: 1,900,000 (Note: United States sales figures for Purpose as of December 29, 2016.)	MC: 9× Platinum; ARIA: 5× Platinum; BPI: 5× Platinum; BVMI: 3× Gold; GLF: 3× Platinum; IFPI DEN: 11× Platinum; RIAA: 6× Platinum; RMNZ: 10× Platinum
Changes	Released: February 14, 2020; Label: Def Jam, RBMG, Schoolboy; Formats: CD, digital download, streaming	1	2	3	9	4	1	2	1	1	1	CAN: 36,000; US: 205,000; UK: 71,824 (Note: United Kingdom sales figures for Changes as of February 2021.)	MC: Gold; BPI: Gold; IFPI DEN: Platinum; RIAA: Platinum; RMNZ: 2× Platinum; SNEP: Gold
Justice	Released: March 19, 2021; Label: Def Jam, RBMG, Schoolboy; Formats: CD, digital download, streaming	1	1	1	8	4	1	1	1	2	1	CAN: 8,000; US: 147,000	MC: 3× Platinum; ARIA: 2× Platinum; BPI: Platinum; GLF: Gold; IFPI DEN: 5× Platinum; RIAA: 2× Platinum; RMNZ: 4× Platinum; SNEP: Platinum
Swag	Released: July 11, 2025; Label: Def Jam, ILH; Formats: CD, digital download, streaming	1	2	1	10	6	1	2	3	4	2		MC: Platinum; BPI: Gold; IFPI DEN: Platinum; RIAA: Platinum; RMNZ: 2× Platinum
Swag II	Released: September 5, 2025; Label: Def Jam, ILH; Formats: CD, digital download, streaming	— (Note: In these countries, streams and sales of Swag II were counted towards the chart placement of the first Swag.)	—	1	24	—	—	6	55	—	—		MC: Platinum; IFPI DEN: Gold
"—" denotes a recording that did not chart or was not released in that territory.

=== Remix albums ===
List of compilation albums, with selected chart positions and certifications
Title	Album details	Peak chart positions										Certifications
Title	Album details	CAN	AUS	DEN	FRA	GER	IRE	NZ	SWI	UK	US	Certifications
My Worlds Acoustic	Released: November 26, 2010; Label: Island, Teen Island, RBMG, Schoolboy; Formats: CD, digital download	4	—	—	—	—	—	—	—	—	7	MC: Platinum; RIAA: Gold
Never Say Never: The Remixes	Released: February 14, 2011; Label: Island, Teen Island, RBMG, Schoolboy; Formats: CD, digital download	1	15	25	71	72	10	14	61	17	1	MC: Platinum; IFPI DEN: Gold; RIAA: Platinum; RMNZ: Gold
Believe Acoustic	Released: January 29, 2013; Label: Island, RBMG, Schoolboy; Formats: CD, digital download	1	2	3	7	36	3	2	3	5	1	MC: Platinum; BPI: Gold; GLF: Gold; IFPI DEN: Platinum; RIAA: Gold
"—" denotes a recording that did not chart or was not released in that territory.

=== Live albums ===
List of live albums, with selected chart positions
Title	Album details	Peak chart positions
Title	Album details	AUS
Swag Live from Coachella (Weekend I)	Released: June 26, 2026; Label: ILH, Def Jam; Formats: Streaming	46
Swag Live from Coachella (Weekend II)	Released: July 3, 2026; Label: ILH, Def Jam; Formats: Streaming	

=== Compilation albums ===
List of compilation albums, with selected chart positions and certifications
Title	Album details	Peak chart positions								Certifications
Title	Album details	CAN	AUS	DEN	FRA	IRE	SWE	UK	US	Certifications
My Worlds: The Collection	Released: November 19, 2010; Label: Island, Teen Island, RBMG, Schoolboy; Formats: CD, digital download	—	—	12	—	—	11	—	—	GLF: Gold; IFPI DEN: 3× Platinum; RMNZ: 5× Platinum
Journals	Released: December 23, 2013; Label: Island, RBMG, Schoolboy; Format: LP, digital download	71	35	2	174	64	—	46	78	BPI: Silver; IFPI DEN: Platinum; RIAA: Platinum; RMNZ: Gold
The Best	Released: February 27, 2019 (Japan only); Label: Def Jam, Universal Japan; Format: CD	—	—	—	—	—	—	—	—	
"—" denotes a recording that did not chart or was not released in that territory.

== Extended plays ==
List of extended plays, with selected chart positions, sales figures and certifications
Title	Details	Peak chart positions										Sales	Certifications
Title	Details	CAN	AUS	DEN	FRA	GER	IRE	SWE	UK	US	US Christ.	Sales	Certifications
My World	Released: November 17, 2009; Label: Island, Teen Island, RBMG, Schoolboy; Formats: CD, digital download	1	79	7	2	18	11	17	4	5	—	US: 1,080,000	MC: 2× Platinum; BPI: 3× Platinum; BVMI: Platinum; IFPI DEN: Gold; RIAA: 3× Platinum
Freedom	Released: April 4, 2021; Label: Def Jam; Formats: Digital download, streaming	—	—	—	—	—	—	—	—	172	3		
"—" denotes a recording that did not chart or was not released in that territory.

== Singles ==
=== As lead artist ===
==== 2000s–2010s ====
List of singles as lead artist, with selected chart positions and certifications, showing year released and album name
Title	Year	Peak chart positions										Certifications	Album
Title	Year	CAN	AUS	DEN	FRA	GER	IRE	NZ	SWE	UK	US	Certifications	Album
"One Time"	2009	12	23	—	13	14	31	6	55	11	17	MC: Platinum; ARIA: 3× Platinum; BPI: Gold; IFPI DEN: Gold; RIAA: 5× Platinum; RMNZ: Platinum	My World
"One Less Lonely Girl"	2009	10	68	—	9	22	9	—	— (Note: "One Less Lonely Girl" did not enter the Swedish Singellista Chart, but peaked at number 12 on the Swedish Heatseeker Chart.)	62	16	MC: Gold; ARIA: Platinum; BPI: Silver; IFPI DEN: Gold; RIAA: 3× Platinum; RMNZ: Platinum	My World
"Baby" (featuring Ludacris)	2010	3	3	13	1	22	7	4	25	3	5	MC: 2× Platinum; ARIA: 8× Platinum; BPI: 3× Platinum; BVMI: Gold; IFPI DEN: 2× Platinum; RIAA: 12× Platinum; RMNZ: 4× Platinum	My World 2.0
"Eenie Meenie" (with Sean Kingston)	2010	14	11	—	—	48	12	5	29	9	15	MC: Gold; ARIA: Platinum; BPI: Platinum; BVMI: Gold; IFPI DEN: Platinum; RIAA: Platinum; RMNZ: 3× Platinum	My World 2.0
"Somebody to Love" (solo or featuring Usher)	2010	10	20	—	17	16	33	12	54	33	15	ARIA: Platinum (both versions separately); BPI: Gold; IFPI DEN: Gold; RIAA: 3× Platinum; RMNZ: 2× Platinum	My World 2.0
"U Smile"	2010	17	65	—	—	—	—	30	—	98	27	ARIA: Platinum; RIAA: Platinum; RMNZ: Gold	My World 2.0
"Never Say Never" (featuring Jaden Smith)	2010	11	17	—	93	93	22	20	73	34	8	MC: Platinum; ARIA: 3× Platinum; BPI: Gold; IFPI DEN: Platinum; RIAA: 5× Platinum; RMNZ: Platinum	Never Say Never: The Remixes
"Pray"	2010	—	94	—	14	51	—	18	—	112	61	MC: Gold; RIAA: Platinum	My Worlds Acoustic
"Mistletoe"	2011	9	13	6	31	19	16	11	9	21	11	MC: 7× Platinum; ARIA: 3× Platinum; BPI: 2× Platinum; BVMI: Platinum; IFPI DEN: 4× Platinum; RIAA: 3× Platinum; RMNZ: 2× Platinum	Under the Mistletoe
"All I Want for Christmas Is You (SuperFestive!)" (with Mariah Carey)	2011	61	—	—	—	—	—	—	—	148	86	MC: Platinum; ARIA: Gold; IFPI DEN: Platinum; RIAA: Gold	Under the Mistletoe
"Boyfriend"	2012	1	5	10	17	16	9	2	7	2	2	MC: 3× Platinum; ARIA: 5× Platinum; BPI: Platinum; BVMI: Platinum; GLF: Gold; IFPI DEN: 2× Platinum; RIAA: 6× Platinum; RMNZ: 2× Platinum	Believe
"As Long as You Love Me" (featuring Big Sean)	2012	9	8	6	48	38	28	6	23	22	6	MC: 2× Platinum; ARIA: 5× Platinum; BPI: Platinum; BVMI: Gold; GLF: Gold; IFPI DEN: 2× Platinum; RIAA: 5× Platinum; RMNZ: 2× Platinum	Believe
"Beauty and a Beat" (featuring Nicki Minaj)	2012	4	5	8	9	1	2	6	1	3	5	MC: 3× Platinum; ARIA: 7× Platinum; BPI: 3× Platinum; BVMI: Platinum; IFPI DEN: 2× Platinum; RIAA: 8× Platinum; RMNZ: 5× Platinum	Believe
"Right Here" (featuring Drake)	2013	—	—	—	—	—	—	—	—	125	95	BPI: Silver; RIAA: Gold; RMNZ: Platinum	Believe
"All Around the World" (featuring Ludacris)	2013	10	34	7	63	53	31	15	41	30	22	MC: Platinum; ARIA: Platinum; IFPI DEN: Platinum; RIAA: Platinum; RMNZ: Gold	Believe
"Heartbreaker"	2013	15	30	1	26	32	12	21	47	14	13	ARIA: Gold; RIAA: Gold; RMNZ: Gold	Journals
"All That Matters"	2013	14	41	1	40	46	14	37	—	20	24	ARIA: Platinum; BPI: Silver; IFPI DEN: Gold; RIAA: Platinum; RMNZ: Platinum	Journals
"Hold Tight"	2013	23	48	1	46	56	21	—	—	28	29	RIAA: Gold	Journals
"Wait for a Minute" (with Tyga)	2013	47	74	6	103	63	42	—	—	41	68	RIAA: Gold	Non-album single
"Recovery"	2013	30	63	5	56	50	25	—	—	28	41		Journals
"Bad Day"	2013	26	54	1	54	66	25	—	—	31	53		Journals
"All Bad"	2013	26	60	2	55	61	24	—	—	34	50		Journals
"PYD" (featuring R. Kelly)	2013	32	56	4	62	64	29	—	—	30	54		Journals
"Roller Coaster"	2013	24	58	1	70	69	31	—	—	37	47		Journals
"Change Me"	2013	34	59	2	84	67	33	—	—	39	59		Journals
"Confident" (featuring Chance the Rapper)	2013	29	53	1	88	61	29	—	49	33	41	ARIA: Platinum; BPI: Platinum; IFPI DEN: Platinum; RIAA: Platinum; RMNZ: 3× Platinum	Journals
"Home to Mama" (with Cody Simpson)	2014	—	—	—	—	—	—	—	57	—	—	IFPI DEN: Gold	Non-album single
"Where Are Ü Now" (with Jack Ü)	2015	5	3	8	24	33	9	3	6	3	8	MC: 7× Platinum; ARIA: 6× Platinum; BPI: 3× Platinum; BVMI: Gold; GLF: Platinum; IFPI DEN: 2× Platinum; RIAA: 6× Platinum; RMNZ: 5× Platinum; SNEP: Platinum	Skrillex and Diplo Present Jack Ü and Purpose
"What Do You Mean?"	2015	1	1	1	3	4	1	1	1	1	1	MC: Diamond; ARIA: 11× Platinum; BPI: 5× Platinum; BVMI: Platinum; GLF: 8× Platinum; IFPI DEN: 5× Platinum; RIAA: 8× Platinum; RMNZ: 7× Platinum; SNEP: Platinum	Purpose
"Sorry"	2015	1	2	1	4	3	1	1	1	1	1	MC: Diamond; ARIA: 13× Platinum; BPI: 6× Platinum; BVMI: 3× Gold; GLF: 8× Platinum; IFPI DEN: 5× Platinum; RIAA: 11× Platinum; RMNZ: 9× Platinum; SNEP: Diamond	Purpose
"Love Yourself"	2015	1	1	1	4	3	1	1	1	1	1	MC: Diamond; ARIA: 15× Platinum; BPI: 6× Platinum; BVMI: Diamond; GLF: 9× Platinum; IFPI DEN: 7× Platinum; RIAA: 9× Platinum; RMNZ: 9× Platinum	Purpose
"Company"	2016	38	34	25	181	—	30	18	35	25	53	MC: 2× Platinum; ARIA: 2× Platinum; BPI: Platinum; GLF: Gold; IFPI DEN: Platinum; RIAA: 2× Platinum; RMNZ: 3× Platinum	Purpose
"Friends" (with BloodPop)	2017	4	2	1	8	4	4	2	2	2	20	MC: 2× Platinum; ARIA: 4× Platinum; BPI: Platinum; BVMI: Platinum; GLF: Gold; IFPI DEN: 2× Platinum; RIAA: Platinum; RMNZ: 2× Platinum	Non-album single
"I Don't Care" (with Ed Sheeran)	2019	2	1	1	5	2	1	2	1	1	2	MC: Diamond; ARIA: 8× Platinum; BPI: 5× Platinum; BVMI: 2× Platinum; GLF: 3× Platinum; IFPI DEN: 4× Platinum; RIAA: 5× Platinum; RMNZ: 7× Platinum; SNEP: Diamond	No.6 Collaborations Project
"Bad Guy" (with Billie Eilish)	2019	—	—	—	—	—	—	—	25	—	—	IFPI DEN: 4× Platinum	Non-album single
"10,000 Hours" (with Dan + Shay)	2019	2	4	8	—	47	17	5	13	17	4	MC: 8× Platinum; ARIA: 2× Platinum; BPI: Platinum; GLF: Gold; IFPI DEN: Platinum; RIAA: 5× Platinum; RMNZ: 3× Platinum	Good Things
"—" denotes a recording that did not chart or was not released in that territory.

==== 2020s ====
List of singles as lead artist, with selected chart positions and certifications, showing year released and album name
Title	Year	Peak chart positions										Certifications	Album
Title	Year	CAN	AUS	DEN	FRA	GER	IRE	NZ	SWE	UK	US	Certifications	Album
"Yummy"	2020	3	4	2	21	15	8	1	6	5	2	MC: 2× Platinum; ARIA: 4× Platinum; BPI: Platinum; IFPI DEN: Platinum; RIAA: 3× Platinum; RMNZ: 2× Platinum; SNEP: Platinum	Changes
"Intentions" (featuring Quavo)	2020	4	2	4	58	23	7	1	9	8	5	MC: 5× Platinum; ARIA: 6× Platinum; BPI: Platinum; BVMI: Gold; IFPI DEN: 2× Platinum; RIAA: 4× Platinum; RMNZ: 5× Platinum; SNEP: Gold	Changes
"Stuck with U" (with Ariana Grande)	2020	1	3	5	29	19	2	1	8	4	1	MC: 4× Platinum; ARIA: 4× Platinum; BPI: Platinum; GLF: Platinum; IFPI DEN: Platinum; RIAA: 2× Platinum; RMNZ: 4× Platinum; SNEP: Gold	Non-album single
"Holy" (featuring Chance the Rapper)	2020	1	4	7	125	22	2	2	5	7	3	MC: 4× Platinum; ARIA: 4× Platinum; BPI: Platinum; GLF: Platinum; IFPI DEN: 2× Platinum; RIAA: 3× Platinum; RMNZ: 3× Platinum; SNEP: Gold	Justice (Note: "Lonely" also appears on Benny Blanco's reissue album Friends Keep Secrets 2.)
"Lonely" (with Benny Blanco)	2020	1	11	4	35	9	7	12	9	17	12	MC: 2× Platinum; ARIA: 2× Platinum; BPI: Gold; BVMI: Gold; GLF: Platinum; IFPI DEN: Platinum; RIAA: 2× Platinum; RMNZ: Platinum; SNEP: Diamond	Justice
"Mood" (Remix) (with 24kGoldn, J Balvin, and Iann Dior)	2020	—	—	—	—	—	—	― (Note: "Mood" (Remix) did not enter the NZ Top 40 Singles Chart, but peaked at number five on the NZ Hot Singles Chart.)	—	—	—		Non-album singles
"Rockin' Around the Christmas Tree"	2020	—	—	—	—	—	—	—	—	4	61	BPI: Silver	Non-album singles
"Monster" (with Shawn Mendes)	2020	1	7	1	75	6	10	8	9	9	8	MC: 3× Platinum; ARIA: 2× Platinum; BPI: Gold; IFPI DEN: Platinum; RIAA: Platinum; RMNZ: 2× Platinum; SNEP: Gold	Wonder
"Anyone"	2021	2	5	3	148	30	5	9	6	4	6	MC: 2× Platinum; ARIA: 3× Platinum; BPI: Platinum; GLF: Platinum; IFPI DEN: Platinum; RIAA: 2× Platinum; RMNZ: 2× Platinum	Justice
"Hold On"	2021	4	6	2	100	18	8	7	14	10	20	MC: 2× Platinum; ARIA: 3× Platinum; BPI: Gold; GLF: Gold; IFPI DEN: Platinum; RIAA: Platinum; RMNZ: 2× Platinum; SNEP: Gold	Justice
"Peaches" (featuring Daniel Caesar and Giveon)	2021	1	1	1	7	2	1	1	3	2	1	MC: 6× Platinum; ARIA: 5× Platinum; BPI: 2× Platinum; BVMI: Gold; GLF: 2× Platinum; IFPI DEN: 3× Platinum; RIAA: 4× Platinum; RMNZ: 5× Platinum; SNEP: Diamond	Justice
"Stay" (with the Kid Laroi)	2021	1	1	1	3	1	2	1	1	2	1	MC: Diamond; ARIA: 17× Platinum; BPI: 4× Platinum; BVMI: 2× Platinum; GLF: 5× Platinum; IFPI DEN: 4× Platinum; RIAA: 11× Platinum; RMNZ: 7× Platinum; SNEP: Diamond	F*ck Love 3: Over You
"Don't Go" (with Skrillex and Don Toliver)	2021	32	43	—	—	—	55	— (Note: "Don't Go" did not enter the NZ Top 40 Singles Chart, but peaked at number seven on the NZ Hot Singles Chart.)	67	56	69		Don't Get Too Close
"Ghost"	2021	2	11	25	—	79	7	16	72	19	5	MC: 2× Platinum; ARIA: 6× Platinum; BPI: 2× Platinum; BVMI: Gold; GLF: Gold; IFPI DEN: 2× Platinum; RIAA: 3× Platinum; RMNZ: 4× Platinum; SNEP: Platinum	Justice
"Wandered to LA" (with Juice Wrld)	2021	29	44	—	—	89	45	— (Note: "Wandered to LA" did not enter the NZ Top 40 Singles Chart, but peaked at number four on the NZ Hot Singles Chart.)	— (Note: "Wandered to LA" did not enter the Swedish Singellista Chart, but peaked at number three on the Swedish Heatseeker Chart.)	59	49		Fighting Demons
"Attention" (with Omah Lay)	2022	45	—	—	—	—	78	— (Note: "Attention" did not enter the NZ Top 40 Singles Chart, but peaked at number nine on the NZ Hot Singles Chart.)	87	76	— (Note: "Attention" did not enter the Billboard Hot 100, but peaked at number 11 on the Bubbling Under Hot 100 chart.)	MC: Gold	Boy Alone
"Honest" (featuring Don Toliver)	2022	21	28	—	183	98	36	— (Note: "Honest" did not enter the NZ Top 40 Singles Chart, but peaked at number four on the NZ Hot Singles Chart.)	— (Note: "Honest" did not enter the Swedish Singellista Chart, but peaked at number 15 on the Swedish Heatseeker Chart.)	54	44		Non-album single
"Daisies"	2025	2	1	3	111	22	2	1	3	1	2	MC: 3× Platinum; ARIA: 2× Platinum; BPI: Platinum; IFPI DEN: Platinum; RMNZ: 3× Platinum; SNEP: Gold	Swag
"Yukon"	2025	8	13	19	—	—	16	12	31	12	12	MC: Platinum; ARIA: 2× Platinum; BPI: Gold; IFPI DEN: Gold; RIAA: 2× Platinum; RMNZ: Platinum	Swag
"First Place"	2025	52	66	—	—	—	—	—	—	—	59		Swag
"Love Song"	2025	63	—	—	—	—	—	— (Note: "Love Song" did not enter the NZ Top 40 Singles Chart, but peaked at number four on the NZ Hot Singles Chart.)	— (Note: "Love Song" did not enter the Swedish Singellista Chart, but peaked at number one on the Swedish Heatseeker Chart.)	—	88		Swag II
"Speed Demon"	2025	42	39	—	—	—	78	— (Note: "Speed Demon" did not enter the NZ Top 40 Singles Chart, but peaked at number two on the NZ Hot Singles Chart.)	— (Note: "Speed Demon" did not enter the Swedish Singellista Chart, but peaked at number one on the Swedish Heatseeker Chart.)	51	66	RMNZ: Gold	Swag II
"—" denotes a recording that did not chart or was not released in that territory.

=== As featured artist ===
List of singles as featured artist, with selected chart positions, sales, certifications, showing year released and album name
Title	Year	Peak chart positions										Certifications	Album
Title	Year	CAN	AUS	DEN	FRA	GER	IRE	NZ	SWE	UK	US	Certifications	Album
"We Are the World 25 for Haiti" (as part of Artists for Haiti)	2010	7	18	10	—	—	9	8	—	50	2		Non-album singles
"Wavin' Flag" (as part of Young Artists for Haiti)	2010	1	—	—	—	—	—	—	—	89	—	MC: 3× Platinum	Non-album singles
"Next to You" (Chris Brown featuring Justin Bieber)	2011	36	22	20	—	28	21	11	—	14	26	ARIA: 2× Platinum; BPI: Platinum; GLF: Gold; IFPI DEN: Gold; RIAA: 2× Platinum; RMNZ: 2× Platinum	F.A.M.E.
"Live My Life" (Far East Movement featuring Justin Bieber)	2012	4	14	17	37	8	6	15	13	7	21	MC: Platinum; ARIA: Platinum; BVMI: Gold; IFPI DEN: Platinum; RMNZ: Platinum	Dirty Bass
"#thatPower" (will.i.am featuring Justin Bieber)	2013	6	6	19	11	7	5	16	3	2	17	ARIA: 2× Platinum; BPI: Gold; BVMI: Gold; GLF: Platinum; IFPI DEN: Platinum; RMNZ: Platinum	#willpower
"Lolly" (Maejor Ali featuring Juicy J and Justin Bieber)	2013	27	98	8	119	—	—	—	57	56	19	IFPI DEN: Gold	Non-album single
"Cold Water" (Major Lazer featuring Justin Bieber and MØ)	2016	1	1	2	2	2	1	1	1	1	2	MC: 3× Platinum; ARIA: 7× Platinum; BPI: 3× Platinum; BVMI: Platinum; IFPI DEN: 4× Platinum; RIAA: 4× Platinum; RMNZ: 6× Platinum; SNEP: Diamond	Major Lazer Essentials
"Let Me Love You" (DJ Snake featuring Justin Bieber)	2016	4	2	3	1	1	2	3	2	2	4	MC: Diamond; ARIA: 10× Platinum; BPI: 4× Platinum; BVMI: Diamond; GLF: 5× Platinum; IFPI DEN: 4× Platinum; RIAA: 6× Platinum; RMNZ: 7× Platinum; SNEP: Diamond	Encore
"Deja Vu" (Post Malone featuring Justin Bieber)	2016	43	—	—	151	—	—	—	— (Note: "Deja Vu" did not enter the Swedish Singellista Chart, but peaked at number 14 on the Swedish Heatseeker Chart.)	63	75	MC: 2× Platinum; ARIA: 2× Platinum; BPI: Gold; IFPI DEN: Gold; RIAA: Platinum; RMNZ: 2× Platinum	Stoney
"Despacito" (Remix) (Luis Fonsi and Daddy Yankee featuring Justin Bieber)	2017	1	1	1	—	—	1	1	1	1	1	MC: Diamond; ARIA: 11× Platinum; BPI: 7× Platinum; BVMI: Gold; GLF: 13× Platinum; IFPI DEN: 7× Platinum; RIAA: 13× Platinum; RMNZ: 4× Platinum	Vida
"I'm the One" (DJ Khaled featuring Justin Bieber, Quavo, Chance the Rapper, and Lil Wayne)	2017	1	1	2	11	4	2	1	2	1	1	MC: 7× Platinum; ARIA: 8× Platinum; BPI: 3× Platinum; BVMI: Platinum; GLF: 4× Platinum; IFPI DEN: 2× Platinum; RIAA: Diamond; RMNZ: 5× Platinum; SNEP: Diamond	Grateful
"2U" (David Guetta featuring Justin Bieber)	2017	4	2	2	3	3	5	4	2	5	16	MC: 2× Platinum; ARIA: 3× Platinum; BPI: Platinum; BVMI: Platinum; IFPI DEN: Platinum; RIAA: Platinum; RMNZ: 2× Platinum; SNEP: Diamond	7
"Hard 2 Face Reality" (Poo Bear featuring Justin Bieber and Jay Electronica)	2018	78	—	23	—	—	—	— (Note: "Hard 2 Face Reality" did not enter the NZ Top 40 Singles Chart, but peaked at number five on the NZ Heatseeker Singles Chart.)	59	—	— (Note: "Hard 2 Face Reality" did not enter the Billboard Hot 100, but peaked at number six on the Bubbling Under Hot 100 chart.)	IFPI DEN: Gold; RMNZ: Gold	Poo Bear Presents Bearthday Music
"No Brainer" (DJ Khaled featuring Justin Bieber, Chance the Rapper, and Quavo)	2018	5	6	1	22	15	4	2	4	3	5	MC: 3× Platinum; ARIA: 4× Platinum; BPI: Platinum; IFPI DEN: Platinum; RIAA: 3× Platinum; RMNZ: 2× Platinum; SNEP: Gold	Father of Asahd
"Love Thru the Computer" (Gucci Mane featuring Justin Bieber)	2019	—	—	—	—	—	—	— (Note: "Love Thru the Computer" did not enter the NZ Top 40 Singles Chart, but peaked at number 16 on the NZ Hot Singles Chart.)	—	—	—		Delusions of Grandeur
"Lean on Me" (as part of ArtistsCAN)	2020	13	—	—	—	—	—	—	—	—	—	MC: Gold	Non-album single
"Let It Go" (DJ Khaled featuring Justin Bieber and 21 Savage)	2021	28	—	—	—	—	53	— (Note: "Let It Go" did not enter the NZ Top 40 Singles Chart, but peaked at number eight on the NZ Hot Singles Chart.)	— (Note: "Let It Go" did not enter the Swedish Singellista Chart, but peaked at number 16 on the Swedish Heatseeker Chart.)	—	54	RIAA: Gold	Khaled Khaled
"Essence" (Remix) (Wizkid featuring Justin Bieber and Tems)	2021	30	—	—	—	—	—	— (Note: "Essence" did not enter the NZ Top 40 Singles Chart, but peaked at number three on the NZ Hot Singles Chart.)	— (Note: "Essence" did not enter the Swedish Singellista Chart, but peaked at number one on the Swedish Heatseeker Chart.)	16	9		Made in Lagos (Deluxe)
"Lonely Christmas" (Bryson Tiller featuring Justin Bieber and Poo Bear)	2021	—	—	—	—	—	—	—	— (Note: "Lonely Christmas" did not enter the Swedish Singellista Chart, but peaked at number one on the Swedish Heatseeker Chart.)	—	—		A Different Christmas
"Up at Night" (Kehlani featuring Justin Bieber)	2022	78	—	—	—	—	94	— (Note: "Up at Night" did not enter the NZ Top 40 Singles Chart, but peaked at number five on the NZ Hot Singles Chart.)	73	90	— (Note: "Up at Night" did not enter the Billboard Hot 100, but peaked at number 14 on the Bubbling Under Hot 100 chart.)		Blue Water Road
"Private Landing" (Don Toliver featuring Justin Bieber and Future)	2023	58	—	—	—	—	78	— (Note: "Private Landing" did not enter the NZ Top 40 Singles Chart, but peaked at number nine on the NZ Hot Singles Chart.)	—	74	72	MC: 2× Platinum; BPI: Silver; RIAA: Platinum; RMNZ: Platinum	Love Sick
"Snooze" (Acoustic) (SZA featuring Justin Bieber)	2023	—	—	—	—	—	—	— (Note: "Snooze" (Acoustic) did not enter the NZ Top 40 Singles Chart, but peaked at number six on the NZ Hot Singles Chart.)	49	—	—	GLF: Gold	Non-album single
"—" denotes a recording that did not chart or was not released in that territory.

Notes

- ^{1}: Uses data combined with the original version to obtain peak chart position.

=== Promotional singles ===
List of promotional singles, with selected chart positions and certifications, showing year released and album name
Title	Year	Peak chart positions										Certifications	Album
Title	Year	CAN	AUS	DEN	FRA	IRE	NOR	NZ	SWE	UK	US	Certifications	Album
"Love Me"	2009	12	65	—	—	—	—	—	—	71	37	ARIA: Platinum; BPI: Silver; IFPI DEN: Gold; RIAA: Platinum; RMNZ: Gold	My World
"Favorite Girl"	2009	15	92	—	—	—	—	—	—	76	26	ARIA: Gold; RIAA: Gold; RMNZ: Gold	My World
"Never Let You Go"	2010	14	67	—	—	—	—	16	—	84	21	ARIA: Gold; RIAA: Platinum	My World 2.0
"The Christmas Song (Chestnuts Roasting on an Open Fire)" (featuring Usher)	2011	59	58	27	—	—	16	—	—	91	58	MC: Gold; IFPI DEN: Gold; RIAA: Gold	Under the Mistletoe
"Turn to You (Mother's Day Dedication)"	2012	22	25	—	79	—	27	18	—	39	60		Non-album promotional single
"Die in Your Arms"	2012	14	31	9	63	28	6	21	—	34	17	ARIA: Gold; RIAA: Gold	Believe
"I'll Show You"	2015	8	16	8	57	14	9	5	12	15	19	MC: Platinum; ARIA: Platinum; BPI: Gold; GLF: Platinum; IFPI DEN: Platinum; IFPI NOR: Platinum; RIAA: Platinum; RMNZ: Platinum	Purpose
"Don't Check on Me" (Chris Brown featuring Justin Bieber and Ink)	2019	48	20	23	—	40	18	13	52	29	67	MC: Gold; ARIA: Gold; BPI: Silver; IFPI DEN: Gold; RIAA: Gold; RMNZ: Platinum	Indigo
"Get Me" (featuring Kehlani)	2020	48	61	—	—	58	—	— (Note: "Get Me" did not enter the NZ Top 40 Singles Chart, but peaked at number four on the NZ Hot Singles Chart.)	80	61	93		Changes
"I Feel Funny"	2022	—	—	—	—	—	—	— (Note: "I Feel Funny" did not enter the NZ Top 40 Singles Chart, but peaked at number 29 on the NZ Hot Singles Chart.)	—	—	—		Non-album promotional singles
"Beautiful Love"	2022	—	—	—	—	—	—	— (Note: "Beautiful Love" did not enter the NZ Top 40 Singles Chart, but peaked at number 26 on the NZ Hot Singles Chart.)	—	—	—		Non-album promotional singles
"—" denotes a recording that did not chart or was not released in that territory.

== Other charted and certified songs ==
=== 2000s–2010s ===
List of songs, with selected chart positions and certifications, showing year released and album name
Title	Year	Peak chart positions										Certifications	Album
Title	Year	CAN	AUS	DEN	FRA	IRE	NOR	NZ	SWE	UK	US	Certifications	Album
"Down to Earth"	2009	61	—	—	—	—	—	—	—	149	79	RIAA: Gold	My World
"Bigger"	2009	78	—	—	—	—	—	—	—	162	94		My World
"First Dance" (featuring Usher)	2009	88	—	—	—	—	—	—	—	156	99		My World
"Common Denominator"	2009	72	—	—	—	—	—	—	—	166	—		My World
"Stuck in the Moment"	2010	—	—	—	—	—	—	—	—	151	— (Note: "Stuck in the Moment" did not enter the Billboard Hot 100, but peaked at number 24 on the Bubbling Under Hot 100 Singles chart, which acts as a 25-song extension to the Hot 100.)	RIAA: Gold	My World 2.0
"Overboard" (featuring Jessica Jarrell)	2010	—	—	—	—	—	—	—	—	182	—		My World 2.0
"Up"	2010	—	—	—	—	—	—	—	—	—	— (Note: "Up" did not enter the Billboard Hot 100, but peaked at number 25 on the Bubbling Under Hot 100 Singles chart, which acts as a 25-song extension to the Hot 100.)		My World 2.0
"That Should Be Me"	2010	99	—	—	—	—	—	—	— (Note: "That Should Be Me" did not enter the Swedish Singellista Chart, but peaked at number 11 on the Swedish Heatseeker Chart.)	179	92	ARIA: Platinum; BPI: Silver; IFPI DEN: Gold; RIAA: 2× Platinum; RMNZ: Gold	My World 2.0
"Kiss and Tell"	2010	—	78	—	—	—	—	—	—	—	—		My World 2.0
"Born to Be Somebody"	2011	56	—	—	—	—	—	—	—	—	74		Never Say Never: The Remixes
"Santa Claus Is Coming to Town"	2011	—	—	—	—	—	—	—	—	—	—	MC: Gold; RIAA: Gold	Under the Mistletoe
"Drummer Boy" (featuring Busta Rhymes)	2011	89	—	—	—	—	—	—	—	—	86	MC: Gold; RIAA: Gold	Under the Mistletoe
"Christmas Love"	2011	—	—	—	—	—	—	—	—	—	—	MC: Gold	Under the Mistletoe
"Fa La La"	2011	—	—	—	—	—	—	—	—	—	—	MC: Gold	Under the Mistletoe
"Take You"	2012	—	—	—	—	—	—	—	—	—	—	RIAA: Gold	Believe
"Be Alright"	2012	—	—	—	—	—	—	—	—	—	— (Note: "Be Alright" did not enter the Billboard Hot 100, but peaked at number 12 on the Bubbling Under Hot 100 Singles chart, which acts as a 25-song extension to the Hot 100.)	IFPI DEN: Gold; IFPI NOR: Platinum; RIAA: Gold	Believe
"Believe"	2012	100	—	—	—	—	—	—	—	—	— (Note: "Believe" did not enter the Billboard Hot 100, but peaked at number 13 on the Bubbling Under Hot 100 Singles chart, which acts as a 25-song extension to the Hot 100.)		Believe
"Maria"	2012	—	—	—	—	—	—	—	—	—	—	BPI: Silver; IFPI DEN: Gold; RMNZ: Gold	Believe
"Beautiful" (with Carly Rae Jepsen)	2012	37	48	37	184	87	—	—	—	68	87		Kiss
"Boyfriend" (Acoustic)	2013	80	—	—	—	—	—	—	—	—	— (Note: "Boyfriend" (Acoustic) did not enter the Billboard Hot 100, but peaked at number 11 on the Bubbling Under Hot 100 Singles chart, which acts as a 25-song extension to the Hot 100.)		Believe Acoustic
"As Long as You Love Me" (Acoustic)	2013	58	—	—	108	—	—	—	40	—	98		Believe Acoustic
"Beauty and a Beat" (Acoustic)	2013	—	—	—	—	—	—	—	48	—	—		Believe Acoustic
"Take You" (Acoustic)	2013	—	—	—	—	—	—	—	—	—	— (Note: "Take You" (Acoustic) did not enter the Billboard Hot 100, but peaked at number 7 on the Bubbling Under Hot 100 Singles chart, which acts as a 25-song extension to the Hot 100.)		Believe Acoustic
"Fall" (Live)	2013	—	—	—	—	—	—	—	—	—	— (Note: "Fall" (Live) did not enter the Billboard Hot 100, but peaked at number 18 on the Bubbling Under Hot 100 Singles chart, which acts as a 25-song extension to the Hot 100.)		Believe Acoustic
"I Would"	2013	98	—	—	—	—	—	—	59	198	— (Note: "I Would" did not enter the Billboard Hot 100, but peaked at number 10 on the Bubbling Under Hot 100 Singles chart, which acts as a 25-song extension to the Hot 100.)		Believe Acoustic
"Nothing Like Us"	2013	43	73	39	193	—	11	—	21	68	59	ARIA: Gold; IFPI DEN: Gold; RIAA: Gold	Believe Acoustic
"One Life"	2013	—	—	34	—	—	—	—	—	—	—		Journals
"Backpack" (featuring Lil Wayne)	2013	—	—	27	—	—	—	—	—	171	—		Journals
"What's Hatnin'" (featuring Future)	2013	—	—	36	—	—	—	—	—	193	—		Journals
"Swap It Out"	2013	—	—	30	—	—	—	—	—	—	—		Journals
"Memphis" (featuring Big Sean)	2013	—	—	31	—	—	—	—	—	—	—		Journals
"Flatline"	2013	—	—	—	—	—	—	—	—	—	—	RMNZ: Gold	Journals
"Maria I'm Drunk" (Travis Scott featuring Justin Bieber and Young Thug)	2015	—	—	—	—	—	—	—	—	—	—	RIAA: Platinum; RMNZ: Gold	Rodeo
"Mark My Words"	2015	29	49	24	—	32	25	22	25	33	42	MC: Platinum; ARIA: Gold; BPI: Silver; GLF: Gold; IFPI DEN: Gold; RIAA: Gold; RMNZ: Gold	Purpose
"No Pressure" (featuring Big Sean)	2015	44	60	—	—	44	—	28	53	38	49	MC: Platinum; ARIA: Gold; BPI: Silver; IFPI DEN: Gold; RIAA: Platinum; RMNZ: Gold	Purpose
"No Sense" (featuring Travis Scott)	2015	42	—	—	198	59	—	36	63	50	54	MC: Platinum; BPI: Silver; RIAA: Platinum; RMNZ: Gold	Purpose
"The Feeling" (featuring Halsey)	2015	25	22	33	163	31	32	20	34	34	31	MC: Platinum; ARIA: Platinum; BPI: Silver; GLF: Gold; IFPI DEN: Gold; IFPI NOR: Gold; RIAA: Platinum; RMNZ: Gold	Purpose
"Life Is Worth Living"	2015	49	—	—	—	65	37	— (Note: "Life Is Worth Living" did not enter the NZ Top 40 Singles Chart, but peaked at number 2 on the NZ Heatseekers chart.)	55	61	67	MC: Platinum; ARIA: Gold; BPI: Silver; IFPI DEN: Gold; RIAA: Gold; RMNZ: Gold	Purpose
"Children"	2015	47	52	—	161	40	29	31	42	44	74	MC: Gold; ARIA: Gold; BPI: Silver; GLF: Gold; IFPI DEN: Gold; RIAA: Gold; RMNZ: Gold	Purpose
"Purpose"	2015	30	40	25	143	38	14	26	22	41	43	MC: Platinum; ARIA: Platinum; BPI: Silver; GLF: Gold; IFPI DEN: Platinum; IFPI NOR: Platinum; RIAA: Platinum; RMNZ: Platinum	Purpose
"Been You"	2015	61	—	—	—	66	—	— (Note: "Been You" did not enter the NZ Top 40 Singles Chart, but peaked at number 5 on the NZ Heatseekers chart.)	60	63	81	MC: Gold; ARIA: Gold; RIAA: Gold	Purpose
"Get Used to It"	2015	73	—	—	—	87	—	—	92	77	90	MC: Gold	Purpose
"We Are" (featuring Nas)	2015	69	—	—	—	—	—	—	95	74	88	MC: Gold	Purpose
"Trust"	2015	80	—	—	—	—	—	—	— (Note: "Trust" did not enter the Swedish Singellista Chart, but peaked at number four on the Swedish Heatseeker Chart.)	88	98		Purpose
"All in It"	2015	94	—	—	—	—	—	—	— (Note: "All in It" did not enter the Swedish Singellista Chart, but peaked at number five on the Swedish Heatseeker Chart.)	91	— (Note: "All in It" did not enter the Billboard Hot 100, but peaked at number seven on the Bubbling Under Hot 100 Singles chart, which acts as a 25-song extension to the Hot 100.)		Purpose
"Juke Jam" (Chance the Rapper featuring Justin Bieber and Towkio)	2016	—	—	—	—	—	—	—	—	—	— (Note: "Juke Jam" did not enter the Billboard Hot 100, but peaked at number 5 on the Bubbling Under Hot 100 Singles chart.)	RIAA: 2× Platinum; RMNZ: Gold	Coloring Book
"—" denotes a recording that did not chart or was not released in that territory.

=== 2020s ===
List of songs, with selected chart positions and certifications, showing year released and album name
Title	Year	Peak chart positions										Certifications	Album
Title	Year	CAN	AUS	DEN	FRA	IRE	NOR	NZ	SWE	UK	US	Certifications	Album
"All Around Me"	2020	69	77	—	—	—	—	—	— (Note: "All Around Me" did not enter the Swedish Singellista Chart, but peaked at number six on the Swedish Heatseeker Chart.)	— (Note: "All Around Me" did not enter the UK Singles Chart, as chart rules only allow three songs per artist to chart within the top one hundred at a time, but peaked at number 82 on the UK Streaming Chart.)	100		Changes
"Habitual"	2020	65	80	—	—	—	—	— (Note: "Habitual" did not enter the NZ Top 40 Singles Chart, but peaked at number six on the NZ Hot Singles Chart.)	— (Note: "Habitual" did not enter the Swedish Singellista Chart, but peaked at number seven on the Swedish Heatseeker Chart.)	— (Note: "Habitual" did not enter the UK Singles Chart, as chart rules only allow three songs per artist to chart within the top one hundred at a time, but peaked at number 88 on the UK Streaming Chart.)	98		Changes
"Come Around Me"	2020	61	68	—	—	—	—	— (Note: "Come Around Me" did not enter the NZ Top 40 Singles Chart, but peaked at number five on the NZ Hot Singles Chart.)	— (Note: "Come Around Me" did not enter the Swedish Singellista Chart, but peaked at number nine on the Swedish Heatseeker Chart.)	— (Note: "Come Around Me" did not enter the UK Singles Chart, as chart rules only allow three songs per artist to chart within the top one hundred at a time, but peaked at number 80 on the UK Streaming Chart.)	86	ARIA: Gold; RIAA: Gold; RMNZ: Gold	Changes
"Available"	2020	83	99	—	—	—	—	—	—	—	— (Note: "Available" did not enter the Billboard Hot 100, but peaked at number eight on the Bubbling Under Hot 100 Singles chart, which acts as a 25-song extension to the Hot 100.)		Changes
"Forever" (featuring Post Malone and Clever)	2020	20	29	17	111	23	21	32	10	29	24	ARIA: Gold; RIAA: Gold; RMNZ: Gold	Changes
"Running Over" (featuring Lil Dicky)	2020	84	—	—	—	—	—	—	—	—	— (Note: "Running Over" did not enter the Billboard Hot 100, but peaked at number six on the Bubbling Under Hot 100 Singles chart, which acts as a 25-song extension to the Hot 100.)		Changes
"Second Emotion" (featuring Travis Scott)	2020	76	95	—	—	—	—	—	—	—	— (Note: "Second Emotion" did not enter the Billboard Hot 100, but peaked at number seven on the Bubbling Under Hot 100 Singles chart, which acts as a 25-song extension to the Hot 100.)		Changes
"Changes"	2020	88	100	—	—	—	—	—	—	—	— (Note: "Changes" did not enter the Billboard Hot 100, but peaked at number 20 on the Bubbling Under Hot 100 Singles chart, which acts as a 25-song extension to the Hot 100.)		Changes
"Confirmation"	2020	96	—	—	—	—	—	—	—	—	— (Note: "Confirmation" did not enter the Billboard Hot 100, but peaked at number 24 on the Bubbling Under Hot 100 Singles chart, which acts as a 25-song extension to the Hot 100.)		Changes
"Falling for You" (Jaden featuring Justin Bieber)	2020	—	—	—	—	—	—	— (Note: "Falling for You" did not enter the NZ Top 40 Singles Chart, but peaked at number fifteen on the NZ Hot Singles Chart.)	—	—	—		CTV3: Cool Tape Vol. 3
"2 Much"	2021	30	40	24	—	—	—	—	69	— (Note: "2 Much" did not enter the Official UK Singles chart, but peaked at number 54 on the Official UK Streaming chart.)	68	ARIA: Gold	Justice
"Deserve You"	2021	32	57	26	—	—	—	—	75	— (Note: "Deserve You" did not enter the Official UK Singles chart, but peaked at number 62 on the Official UK Streaming chart.)	76		Justice
"As I Am" (featuring Khalid)	2021	9	23	5	166	14	18	32	29	24	43	ARIA: Gold; IFPI DEN: Gold; IFPI NOR: Gold; RIAA: Gold; RMNZ: Gold	Justice
"Off My Face"	2021	25	42	15	—	—	—	— (Note: "Off My Face" did not enter the NZ Top 40 Singles Chart, but peaked at number five on the NZ Hot Singles Chart.)	68	— (Note: "Off My Face" did not enter the Official UK Singles chart, but peaked at number 52 on the Official UK Streaming chart.)	64	ARIA: Gold; IFPI DEN: Gold; RIAA: Gold; RMNZ: Gold	Justice
"Unstable" (featuring the Kid Laroi)	2021	17	22	12	—	—	33	— (Note: "Unstable" did not enter the NZ Top 40 Singles Chart, but peaked at number four on the NZ Hot Singles Chart.)	53	— (Note: "Unstable" did not enter the Official UK Singles chart, but peaked at number 46 on the Official UK Streaming chart.)	62	ARIA: Gold; RIAA: Gold	Justice
"Die for You" (featuring Dominic Fike)	2021	40	66	29	—	—	—	—	99	— (Note: "Die for You" did not enter the Official UK Singles chart, but peaked at number 84 on the Official UK Streaming chart.)	81		Justice
"Somebody"	2021	48	80	37	—	—	—	—	—	— (Note: "Somebody" did not enter the Official UK Singles chart, but peaked at number 91 on the Official UK Streaming chart.)	91		Justice
"Love You Different" (featuring Beam)	2021	35	72	31	—	—	—	—	91	— (Note: "Love You Different" did not enter the Official UK Singles chart, but peaked at number 73 on the Official UK Streaming chart.)	84		Justice
"Loved by You" (featuring Burna Boy)	2021	31	68	28	—	—	—	—	100	— (Note: "Loved by You" did not enter the Official UK Singles chart, but peaked at number 55 on the Official UK Streaming chart.)	87		Justice
"There She Go" (featuring Lil Uzi Vert)	2021	—	—	—	—	—	—	— (Note: "There She Go" did not enter the NZ Top 40 Singles Chart, but peaked at number 22 on the NZ Hot Singles Chart.)	—	—	—		Justice
"Lifetime"	2021	85	—	—	—	—	—	— (Note: "Lifetime" did not enter the NZ Top 40 Singles Chart, but peaked at number 13 on the NZ Hot Singles Chart.)	—	—	—		Justice
"Know No Better" (featuring DaBaby)	2021	—	—	—	—	—	—	— (Note: "Know No Better" did not enter the NZ Top 40 Singles Chart, but peaked at number 35 on the NZ Hot Singles Chart.)	—	—	—		Justice
"Freedom" (with Beam)	2021	—	—	—	—	—	—	— (Note: "Freedom" did not enter the NZ Top 40 Singles Chart, but peaked at number 34 on the NZ Hot Singles Chart.)	—	—	—		Freedom
"Where Do I Fit In" (featuring Tori Kelly, Chandler Moore, and Judah Smith)	2021	—	—	—	—	—	—	— (Note: "Where Do I Fit In" did not enter the NZ Top 40 Singles Chart, but peaked at number 28 on the NZ Hot Singles Chart.)	—	—	—		Freedom
"What You See" (with Migos)	2021	—	—	—	—	—	—	—	—	—	— (Note: "What You See" did not enter the Billboard Hot 100, but peaked at number 25 on the Bubbling Under Hot 100 Singles chart, which acts as a 25-song extension to the Hot 100.)		Culture III
"Red Eye" (featuring TroyBoi)	2021	40	—	—	—	78	—	— (Note: "Red Eye" did not enter the NZ Top 40 Singles Chart, but peaked at number three on the NZ Hot Singles Chart.)	— (Note: "Red Eye" did not enter the Swedish Singellista Chart, but peaked at number eight on the Swedish Heatseeker Chart.)	88	— (Note: "Red Eye" did not enter the Billboard Hot 100, but peaked at number 16 on the Bubbling Under Hot 100 Singles chart, which acts as a 25-song extension to the Hot 100.)		Justice
"Angels Speak" (featuring Poo Bear)	2021	—	—	—	—	—	—	— (Note: "Angels Speak" did not enter the NZ Top 40 Singles Chart, but peaked at number 39 on the NZ Hot Singles Chart.)	—	—	—		Justice
"Hailey"	2021	—	—	—	—	—	39	— (Note: "Hailey" did not enter the NZ Top 40 Singles Chart, but peaked at number 25 on the NZ Hot Singles Chart.)	53	—	—		Justice
"All I Can Take"	2025	12	22	13	—	30	41	19	61	33	21	MC: Gold	Swag
"Go Baby"	2025	11	18	14	—	59	48	16	58	49	18	MC: Gold	Swag
"Things You Do"	2025	29	32	32	—	—	79	27	— (Note: "Things You Do" did not enter the Swedish Singellista Chart, but peaked at number four on the Swedish Heatseeker Chart.)	—	35		Swag
"Butterflies"	2025	34	40	39	—	—	100	33	— (Note: "Butterflies" did not enter the Swedish Singellista Chart, but peaked at number 10 on the Swedish Heatseeker Chart.)	—	49		Swag
"Way It Is" (with Gunna)	2025	33	43	38	—	—	99	34	— (Note: "Way It Is" did not enter the Swedish Singellista Chart, but peaked at number 12 on the Swedish Heatseeker Chart.)	—	33		Swag
"Walking Away"	2025	25	38	29	—	—	91	28	— (Note: "Walking Away" did not enter the Swedish Singellista Chart, but peaked at number three on the Swedish Heatseeker Chart.)	—	37	MC: Gold	Swag
"Glory Voice Memo"	2025	66	—	—	—	—	—	—	—	—	83		Swag
"Devotion" (with Dijon)	2025	50	58	—	—	—	—	31	—	—	56		Swag
"Dadz Love" (with Lil B)	2025	65	—	—	—	—	—	—	—	—	84		Swag
"Sweet Spot" (with Sexyy Red)	2025	54	86	—	—	—	—	—	—	—	57		Swag
"405"	2025	70	—	—	—	—	—	—	—	—	86		Swag
"Swag" (with Cash Cobain and Eddie Benjamin)	2025	62	—	—	—	—	—	—	—	—	70		Swag
"Zuma House"	2025	85	—	—	—	—	—	—	—	—	— (Note: "Zuma House" did not enter the Billboard Hot 100, but peaked at number nine on the Bubbling Under Hot 100 chart, which acts as a 25-song extension to the Hot 100.)		Swag
"Too Long"	2025	71	—	—	—	—	—	—	—	—	79		Swag
"Better Man"	2025	78	—	—	—	—	—	— (Note: "Better Man" did not enter the NZ Top 40 Singles Chart, but peaked at number six on the NZ Hot Singles Chart.)	—	—	— (Note: "Better Man" did not enter the Billboard Hot 100, but peaked at number four on the Bubbling Under Hot 100 chart, which acts as a 25-song extension to the Hot 100.)		Swag II
"I Do"	2025	82	—	—	—	—	—	—	—	—	— (Note: "I Do" did not enter the Billboard Hot 100, but peaked at number 18 on the Bubbling Under Hot 100 chart, which acts as a 25-song extension to the Hot 100.)		Swag II
"I Think You're Special" (with Tems)	2025	80	—	—	—	—	—	— (Note: "I Think You're Special" did not enter the NZ Top 40 Singles Chart, but peaked at number seven on the NZ Hot Singles Chart.)	—	—	— (Note: "I Think You're Special" did not enter the Billboard Hot 100, but peaked at number six on the Bubbling Under Hot 100 chart, which acts as a 25-song extension to the Hot 100.)		Swag II
"Mother in You"	2025	85	—	—	—	—	—	—	—	—	— (Note: "Mother in You" did not enter the Billboard Hot 100, but peaked at number 20 on the Bubbling Under Hot 100 chart, which acts as a 25-song extension to the Hot 100.)		Swag II
"Witchya"	2025	97	—	—	—	—	—	—	—	—	—		Swag II
"Everything Hallelujah"	2025	76	—	—	—	—	—	—	— (Note: "Everything Hallelujah" did not enter the Swedish Singellista Chart, but peaked at number two on the Swedish Heatseeker Chart.)	—	— (Note: "Everything Hallelujah" did not enter the Billboard Hot 100, but peaked at number six on the Bubbling Under Hot 100 chart, which acts as a 25-song extension to the Hot 100.)		Swag II
"—" denotes a recording that did not chart or was not released in that territory.

== Guest appearances ==
List of non-single guest appearances, showing other artist(s), year released and album name
Title	Year	Other artist(s)	Album
"Rich Girl"	2010	Soulja Boy	Best Rapper
"Won't Stop"	2011	Sean Kingston	King of Kingz
"Ladies Love Me"	2011	Chris Brown	Boy in Detention
"Trust Issues" (Remix)	2011	Drake	None
"Thinkin Bout You"	2011	Jaden	None
"Happy New Year"	2012	Jaden	None
"Love Me Like You Do" (Remix)	2012	Jaden	None
"Actin' Up"	2013	Asher Roth, Rye Rye, Chris Brown	The Greenhouse Effect Vol. 2
"Slave to the Rhythm"	2013	Michael Jackson	None
"Twerk"	2013	Lil Twist, Miley Cyrus	None
"The Intro"	2013	DJ Tay James	We Know the DJ Radio, Vol. 3
"Gas Pedal" (Remix)	2013	Sage the Gemini, Iamsu!	Remember Me
"Broken"	2014	Blake Kelly	We Know the DJ Radio, Vol. 4
"Foreign" (Remix)	2014	Trey Songz	Trigga
"Time for Bed"	2014	Khalil	A Long Story Short
"Playtime"	2014	Khalil	A Long Story Short
"Why You Mad?" (Infinity Remix)	2015	Mariah Carey, French Montana, T.I.	None
"Maria I'm Drunk"	2015	Travis Scott, Young Thug	Rodeo
"Future"	2015	Khalil, Kehlani	None
"Juke Jam"	2016	Chance the Rapper, Towkio	Coloring Book
"Earth"	2019	Lil Dicky	None
"Falling for You"	2020	Jaden	CTV3: Cool Tape Vol. 3
"What You See"	2021	Migos	Culture III
"Sundown"	2022	Beam	Alien
"Moments"	2023	Diddy	The Love Album: Off the Grid
