= Swag Live from Coachella (Weekend I) =

Live album by Justin Bieber
- Released: June 26, 2026
- Recorded: April 11, 2026
- Venue: Empire Polo Club in Indio, California
- Length: 64:04
- Labels: ILH; Def Jam

Justin Bieber chronology
Swag II (2025)	Swag Live from Coachella (Weekend I) (2026)	Swag Live from Coachella (Weekend II) (2026)

Swag Live from Coachella (Weekend I) is the first live album by Canadian singer Justin Bieber. It was released through Def Jam Recordings and ILH Productions on June 26, 2026. The album consists of all of the songs that Bieber performed during the first weekend of Coachella 2026, which took place at the Empire Polo Club in Indio, California on April 11. All but two of the songs performed are from his seventh and eighth studio albums Swag and Swag II, both released in 2025. It was fully released online on YouTube the same day.

== Background ==
On July 10, 2025, Bieber released his seventh studio album titled Swag shortly after teasing an upcoming project through billboards in Iceland, earlier that same day. It debuted at number two on the Billboard 200 with 163,000 equivalent album units earned in the US in its opening week. The album's lead single "Daisies" debuted at number two on the Billboard Hot 100 and became his 27th top-ten single in the US, tying Janet Jackson for the tenth-most in history. On September 4, Bieber announced his album Swag II would be released the next day.

The Coachella Valley Music and Arts Festival, sometimes referred to as "Coachella Festival" or simply "Coachella," is held annually at the Empire Polo Club in Indio, California, United States. It was co-founded by Paul Tollett and Rick Van Santen in 1999, and is organized by Goldenvoice, a subsidiary of AEG Presents. The event features musical artists from many genres of music, including rock, pop, indie, hip hop, latin, and electronic dance music, as well as art installations and sculptures. Most of the performances are streamed live on YouTube, with some sets broadcast on a delayed basis.

The lineup for the 2026 edition of the festival was announced on September 15, 2025, with Sabrina Carpenter, Bieber, Karol G, and Anyma as headliners. Bieber's set featured guest appearances from The Kid Laroi, Dijon, Tems, Wizkid, and Mk.gee on the first weekend, On June 25, Bieber announced that the recordings of his Coachella set would stream on YouTube and be released the following day on June 26.

== Track listing ==
Swag Live from Coachella (Weekend I) track listing
No.	Title	Writer(s)	Producer(s)	Length
1.	"All I Can Take"	Justin Bieber; Eddie Benjamin; Carter Lang; Dylan Wiggins; Daniel Chetrit; Tobias Jesso Jr.; Jackson Lee Morgan	Bieber; Benjamin; Lang; Wiggins; Chetrit	3:53
2.	"Speed Demon"	Bieber; Benjamin; Lang; Wiggins; Chetrit; Morgan; Jesso	Benjamin; Lang; Wiggins; Chetrit	3:32
3.	"First Place"	Bieber; Benjamin; Lang; Wiggins; Kevin Rhomberg; Jesso; Morgan; Chetrit	Bieber; Benjamin; Lang; Wiggins; Knox Fortune	3:22
4.	"Go Baby"	Bieber; Benjamin; Lang; Wiggins; Eli Teplin; Jesso; Morgan; Chetrit	Benjamin; Lang; Wiggins; Teplin	3:20
5.	"Butterflies"	Bieber; Benjamin; Lang; Wiggins; Benjamin; Chetrit; Jesso; Morgan	Bieber; Benjamin; Lang; Wiggins; Chetrit	3:04
6.	"Walking Away"	Bieber; Lang; Wiggins; Jesso; Morgan; Chetrit	Bieber; Benjamin; Lang; Wiggins	3:56
7.	"All the Way"	Bieber; Benjamin; Lang; Wiggins; Darhyl Camper Jr.; Will Miller; Jesso; Morgan	Benjamin; Lang; Wiggins; Camper; Miller	1:49
8.	"405"	Bieber; Benjamin; Lang; Wiggins; Jesso; Morgan; Chetrit	Bieber; Benjamin; Lang; Wiggins	2:37
9.	"Too Long"	Bieber; Benjamin; Bernard Harvey; Lang; Wiggins; Jesso; Morgan; Chetrit	Benjamin; Harv; Lang; Wiggins	1:24
10.	"Petting Zoo"	Bieber; Benjamin; Lang; Wiggins; Morgan	Benjamin; Lang; Wiggins	1:18
11.	"I Do"	Bieber; Benjamin; Lang; Wiggins; Jesso; Chetrit; Morgan	Benjamin; Lang; Wiggins	2:24
12.	"Stay" (with the Kid Laroi)	Bieber; Charlton Howard; Magnus Høiberg; Charlie Puth; Omer Fedi; Blake Slatkin; Michael Mulé; Isaac De Boni; Subhaan Rahmaan	Cashmere Cat; Puth; Fedi; Slatkin	2:32
13.	"Things You Do" (acoustic)	Bieber; Lang; Duenas	Lang; Wiggins	2:18
14.	"Glory Voice Memo" (acoustic)	Bieber; Lang; Wiggins; Chetrit	Lang; Wiggins	1:31
15.	"Zuma House" (acoustic)	Bieber; Lang	Lang; Wiggins	1:51
16.	"Dotted Line" (acoustic)	Bieber; Lang; Morgan	Lang; Wiggins	2:39
17.	"Everything Hallelujah" (acoustic)	Bieber; Benjamin; Lang; Wiggins; Teplin; Jesso; Chetrit; Morgan	Lang; Wiggins	4:35
18.	"Yukon"	Bieber; Duenas; Lang; Wiggins; Chetrit; Tauheed Epps; Marshall Mathers III; Kejuan Muchita; David White; John Medora; Robert Crawford; Michael Crawford	Dijon; Lang; Wiggins; Chetrit	2:55
19.	"Devotion" (with Dijon)	Bieber; Duenas; Ashton Simmonds; Lang; Wiggins; Chetrit	Dijon; Daniel Caesar; Lang; Wiggins; Chetrit	3:39
20.	"I Think You're Special" (with Tems)	Bieber; Temilade Openiyi; Benjamin; Lang; Wiggins; Jesso; Chetrit; Morgan; James Fauntleroy	Benjamin; Lang; Wiggins	2:55
21.	"Essence" (with Wizkid and Tems)	Bieber; Ayodeji Balogun; Openiyi; Uzezi Oniko; Okiemute Oniko; Richard Isong	Legendury Beatz; P2J	4:12
22.	"Daisies"	Bieber; Duenas; Michael Gordon; Lang; Wiggins; Benjamin; Chetrit; Jesso	Dijon; Mk.gee; Lang; Wiggins; Benjamin; Chetrit	4:18
Total length:				64:04

== Charts ==
Chart performance for Swag Live From Coachella (Weekend I)
Chart (2026)	Peak position
Australian Albums (ARIA)	46

== Release history ==
Release history for Swag Live From Coachella (Weekend I)
Region	Date	Label(s)	Format(s)	Ref.
Various	June 26, 2026	ILH; Def Jam	Digital download; streaming	
