= Way It Is =

Song by Justin Bieber and Gunna

from the album Swag
- Released: July 11, 2025
- Genre: R&B
- Length: 3:15
- Label: Def Jam; ILH
- Songwriters: Justin Bieber; Sergio Kitchens; Carter Lang; Dylan Wiggins; Eddie Benjamin; Tobias Jesso Jr.; Jackson Morgan; Daniel Chetrit
- Producers: Lang; Wiggins

"Way It Is" is a song by Canadian singer Justin Bieber and American rapper Gunna. It was released through Def Jam Recordings and ILH Productions as the seventh track from Bieber's seventh studio album, Swag, on July 11, 2025. The two artists wrote the song with producers Carter Lang and Dylan Wiggins, alongside Eddie Benjamin, Tobias Jesso Jr., Daniel Chetrit, and Jackson Morgan.

== Composition and critical reception ==
Lyndsey Havens of Billboard ranked "Way It Is" fifteenth among the album's tracks, describing it as "one of the most straightforward R&Bieber tracks on the album, offering a reminder that despite some of the more experimental swings he takes throughout Swag he's still the same artist his fans have loved all this time", while "Gunna's verse, though brief, fits in seamlessly thanks to Bieber harmonizing just below his vocals, as if he was too into the track to step away even for a moment". Gunna was also praised for his versatility as an artist due to him "delivering a melodic verse that perfectly captures the laid-back vibe of the song and strongly plays off Bieber's vocals", but Bieber's chorus was criticized because it does not doesn't quite "hook you" but "does an admirable job in trying". The song was also likened to "Hours in Silence" by rappers Drake and 21 Savage from their collaborative studio album, Her Loss (2022), with Bieber's vocals also being compared to Drake and his chemistry with Gunna being "unexpectedly well".

== Charts ==
Chart performance for "Way It Is"
Chart (2025)	Peak position
Australia (ARIA)	43
Canada Hot 100 (Billboard)	33
Denmark (Tracklisten)	38
Global 200 (Billboard)	27
New Zealand (Recorded Music NZ)	34
Nigeria (TurnTable Top 100)	87
Norway (IFPI Norge)	99
Sweden Heatseeker (Sverigetopplistan)	12
US Billboard Hot 100	33
US Hot R&B/Hip-Hop Songs (Billboard)	7

== Certifications ==
Certifications for "Way It Is"
Region	Certification	Certified units/sales
Brazil (Pro-Música Brasil)	Gold	20,000^{‡}
^{‡} Sales+streaming figures based on certification alone.
