= Butterflies (Justin Bieber song) =

Song by Justin Bieber

from the album Swag
- Released: July 11, 2025
- Length: 3:13
- Label: Def Jam; ILH
- Songwriters: Justin Bieber; Eddie Benjamin; Carter Lang; Dylan Wiggins; Daniel Chetrit; Tobias Jesso Jr.; Jackson Morgan
- Producers: Bieber; Benjamin; Lang; Wiggins; Chetrit

"Butterflies" is a song by Canadian singer Justin Bieber. It was released through Def Jam Recordings and ILH Productions as the sixth track from his seventh studio album, Swag, on July 11, 2025. The song was produced by Bieber himself, Eddie Benjamin, Carter Lang, Dylan Wiggins, and Daniel Chetrit, with the five of them writing it alongside Tobias Jesso Jr. and Jackson Morgan.

== Composition and critical reception ==
"Butterflies" starts with one of Bieber's encounters with paparazzi that happened on April 9, 2025, where he started off by saying: "You just want money / Money money money money". An R&B song with a pop influence, it shows Bieber being "open-hearted" and melodic with its "quivering guitar hook" being compared to American alternative rock band the Smashing Pumpkins. It was described as "a reflective Bieber who's more interested in dialing back the theatrics and upping the introspection" as he uses melisma. Lyndsey Havens of Billboard ranked it eighth among the album's tracks, summarizing: "as the sixth track on the album, it's clear he's nowhere near done running just yet", but "some things, he might be realizing, you can never really outrun anyway".

== Charts ==
Chart performance for "Butterflies"
Chart (2025–2026)	Peak position
Australia (ARIA)	40
Canada Hot 100 (Billboard)	34
Denmark (Tracklisten)	39
Global 200 (Billboard)	34
New Zealand (Recorded Music NZ)	33
Norway (IFPI Norge)	100
Sweden Heatseeker (Sverigetopplistan)	10
UK Christian Songs (Cross Rhythms)	1
US Billboard Hot 100	49

== Certifications ==
Certifications for "Butterflies"
Region	Certification	Certified units/sales
Brazil (Pro-Música Brasil)	Gold	20,000^{‡}
^{‡} Sales+streaming figures based on certification alone.
