= Pink Sweats =

American R&B recording artist

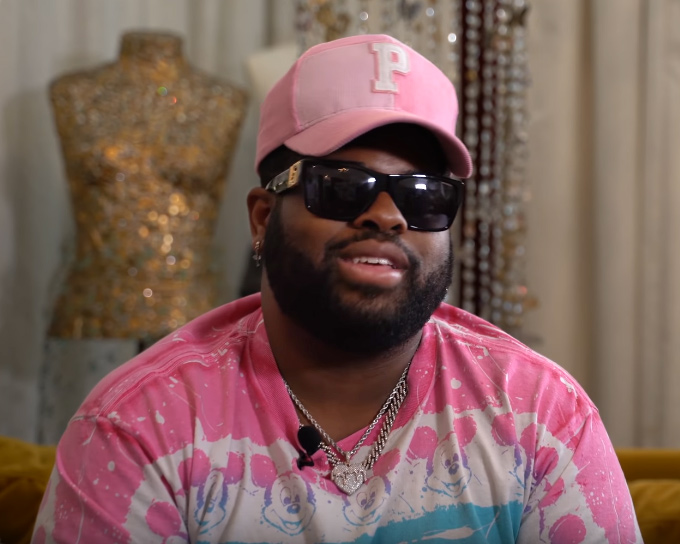
- Pink Sweats in 2020

Background information
- Born: David Bowden; February 14, 1992 (age 34); Philadelphia, Pennsylvania, U.S.
- Genres: R&B; pop
- Occupations: Singer; songwriter; record producer
- Years active: 2018–present
- Labels: Human Re Sources; Atlantic
- Website: pinksweatsmusic.com

David Bowden (born February 14, 1992), known professionally as Pink Sweats (stylized as Pink Sweat$), is an American singer, songwriter and record producer. He gained recognition in 2018 with his single "Honesty". His debut album, Pink Planet, was released in 2021.

== Early life and career ==
Bowden grew up in Philadelphia, Pennsylvania. His father is a minister and his mother is a gospel singer. He was raised in a religious household and was only allowed to listen to Christian music until he was 17 years old. The first rap artists he listened to were 50 Cent and Kanye West. After graduating high school, Bowden had a three-year battle with achalasia, and his recovery from the disease made him want to pursue music as a full-time career. His stage name was adopted as he always wore pink sweatpants (taking inspiration from Cam'ron) and was given the nickname "Pink Sweats". He first started making music at the age of 19 as a demo vocalist at Sigma Sound Studios, where he discovered his love for songwriting and began to develop his career in music. He produced in different genres of music for rapper Tierra Whack and country duo Florida Georgia Line.

On July 12, 2018, he released his first single "Honesty", which later started to gain attention on streaming platforms, reaching number 10 on Spotify's US Viral Chart. The song's popularity was boosted after it was featured in Spotify's "Are & Be" playlist. A remix featuring Jessie Reyez was released afterwards. He released the second single "No Replacing You" on July 26. His debut EP Volume 1 was released on November 2, 2018, as the singer put out a music video for "Drama" later that month. He later followed this release with the sequel EP Volume 2. Each EP contains 5 songs; Bowden stated it was an intentional decision to make short songs designed for streaming.

Due to the COVID-19 pandemic in 2020, Bowden's album was pushed back, and he released an EP, titled The Prelude, in its place. In February 2021, Pink Sweats' debut album, Pink Planet, was released. The album work began in the end of the 2019 and continued for roughly a year. In January 2021, a remix of the album's single "At My Worst" was released with Kehlani. The pair performed the song on The Tonight Show Starring Jimmy Fallon on March 10, 2021.

Pink Sweats performed at the 14th Seoul Jazz Festival on May 25, 2022.

== Personal life ==
Bowden became engaged to his girlfriend, JL Bunny, in March 2021. They married in August 21, 2022.

== Discography ==
=== Studio albums ===
Title	Album details	Peak chart positions	
Title	Album details	US	CAN
Pink Planet	Released: February 12, 2021; Label: Atlantic; Format: Digital download, streaming	133	91
Pink Moon	Released: January 28, 2022; Label: Atlantic; Format: Digital download, streaming	—	—
"—" denotes a recording that did not chart or was not released.

=== Extended plays ===
Title	EP details
Volume 1	Released: November 2, 2018; Label: Human Re Sources, Atlantic; Format: Digital download, streaming
Volume 2	Released: March 28, 2019; Label: Human Re Sources, Atlantic; Format: Digital download, streaming
The Prelude	Released: July 17, 2020; Label: Atlantic; Format: Digital download, streaming

=== Singles ===
==== As lead artist ====
List of singles, with selected chart positions and certifications
Title	Year	Peak chart positions							Certifications	Album
Title	Year	US Bub.	CAN	KOR	MLY	SGP	VIE	WW	Certifications	Album
"Honesty"	2018	—	—	158	—	—	—	—	RIAA: Platinum	Volume 1
"No Replacing You"	2018	—	—	—	—	—	—	—		Volume 1
"Drama"	2018	—	—	—	—	—	—	—		Volume 1
"I Know"	2019	—	—	—	—	—	—	—		Volume 2
"Coke & Henny, Pt. 1"	2019	—	—	—	—	—	—	—		Volume 2
"Coke & Henny, Pt. 2"	2019	—	—	—	—	—	—	—		Volume 2
"I Wanna Be Yours" (with Crush)	2019	—	—	—	—	—	—	—		Non-album singles
"This Christmas" (with Donny Hathaway)	2019	—	—	—	—	—	—	—		Non-album singles
"Only a Fool" (with Galantis and Ship Wrek)	2020	—	—	—	—	—	—	—		Non-album singles
"17" (solo or with Joshua and DK from Seventeen)	2020	—	—	—	—	—	—	—		The Prelude
"Icy"	2020	—	—	—	—	—	—	—		The Prelude
"At My Worst" (solo or with Kehlani)	2020	22	77	92	1	2	33	78	RIAA: Platinum; MC: Platinum	Pink Planet
"Heaven"	2021	—	—	—	—	—	—	—		Pink Planet
"—" denotes a recording that did not chart or was not released.

==== As featured artist ====
Title	Year	Album
"Man on Fire" (Thutmose featuring Pink Sweat$)	2018	Man on Fire
"Upset" (Gashi featuring Pink Sweat$ and Njomza)	2020	1984
"Make It Hot" (ALLY featuring Pink Sweat$)	2024	—N/a

=== Guest appearances ===
Title	Year	Other artist(s)	Album
"50 in da Safe"	2019	Wale	Wow... That's Crazy
"Where You Go I Follow"	2021	Justin Bieber	Freedom
