= Go Baby =

Song by Justin Bieber

from the album Swag
- Released: July 11, 2025
- Length: 3:14
- Label: Def Jam; ILH
- Songwriters: Justin Bieber; Eddie Benjamin; Carter Lang; Dylan Wiggins; Eli Teplin; Tobias Jesso Jr.; Jackson Morgan; Daniel Chetrit
- Producers: Benjamin; Lang; Wiggins; Teplin

"Go Baby" is a song by Canadian singer Justin Bieber. It was released through Def Jam Recordings and ILH Productions as the fourth track from his seventh studio album, Swag, on July 11, 2025. The song was produced by Bieber himself, Eddie Benjamin, Carter Lang, Dylan Wiggins, and Daniel Chetrit, with the five of them writing it alongside Tobias Jesso Jr. and Jackson Morgan.

== Composition ==
"Go Baby" was theorized as a song in which the singer "seems to shut down any speculation of his marital status" on "a very sweet ditty about Bieber voicing admiration for his significant other, an anthem spouses everywhere can get behind". Bieber openly shows support to his wife, Hailey Bieber, and her Rhode skincare and beauty brand by singing: "That's my baby, she's iconic / iPhone case, lip gloss on it". He offers her a shoulder to lean on in her times of need and reminds her that she does not have to pretend to feel okay to be loved.

== Critical reception ==
Rachel Aroesti of The Guardian felt that the song "rarely transcend[s] superficial, saccharine cliche", but is "at least preferable to the eye-watering spoken-word segments". Adam White of The Independent simply described it as one of the "plodding love songs" from the album. Lyndsey Havens of Billboard ranked it fifth among the album's tracks, concluding that the song "proves that there's no love lost — rather, Bieber and his wife are one another's biggest fans when they need it most".

== Charts ==
Chart performance for "Go Baby"
Chart (2025)	Peak position
Australia (ARIA)	18
Brazil Hot 100 (Billboard)	68
Canada Hot 100 (Billboard)	11
Denmark (Tracklisten)	14
Global 200 (Billboard)	12
Ireland (IRMA)	59
Netherlands (Single Top 100)	56
New Zealand (Recorded Music NZ)	16
Norway (IFPI Norge)	48
Philippines (Philippines Hot 100)	56
Sweden (Sverigetopplistan)	58
UK Singles (OCC)	49
US Billboard Hot 100	18
US Hot R&B/Hip-Hop Songs (Billboard)	4

== Certifications ==
Certifications for "Go Baby"
Region	Certification	Certified units/sales
Brazil (Pro-Música Brasil)	Platinum	40,000^{‡}
Canada (Music Canada)	Gold	40,000^{‡}
^{‡} Sales+streaming figures based on certification alone.
