= Walking Away (Justin Bieber song) =

Song by Justin Bieber

from the album Swag
- Released: July 11, 2025
- Length: 4:04
- Label: Def Jam; ILH
- Songwriters: Justin Bieber; Eddie Benjamin; Carter Lang; Dylan Wiggins; Tobias Jesso Jr.; Jackson Morgan; Daniel Chetrit
- Producers: Bieber; Benjamin; Lang; Wiggins

"Walking Away" is a song by Canadian singer Justin Bieber. It was released through Def Jam Recordings and ILH Productions as the tenth track from his seventh studio album, Swag, on July 11, 2025. The song was produced by Bieber himself, Eddie Benjamin, Carter Lang, and Dylan Wiggins, with the four of them writing it alongside Tobias Jesso Jr., Jackson Morgan, and Daniel Chetrit.

== Composition and critical reception ==
"Walking Away" is inspired by Bieber's wife, Hailey Bieber, in which he dismisses false relationship narratives about them that were represented in the media in the past few years, while promising to stay committed to her and change his ways for the better. A "pensive" song, sings over soft Roland TR-808 drums about having a solid relationship with her. Lyndsey Havens of Billboard ranked it third among the album's tracks and described it as "a goosebump-raising confessional about why Bieber isn't 'walking away' from his marriage", summarizing that "this song functions like a refreshingly honest vow renewal, as Bieber recalls giving Hailey her ring and promising to change" and "he sounds undoubtedly sincere — but then again, there's only one listener who can be the judge of that".

== Charts ==
=== Weekly charts ===
Weekly chart performance for "Walking Away"
Chart (2025)	Peak position
Australia (ARIA)	38
Canada Hot 100 (Billboard)	25
Denmark (Tracklisten)	29
Global 200 (Billboard)	26
Lithuania Airplay (TopHit)	52
New Zealand (Recorded Music NZ)	28
Norway (IFPI Norge)	91
Philippines (Philippines Hot 100)	89
Sweden Heatseeker (Sverigetopplistan)	3
US Billboard Hot 100	37

=== Monthly charts ===
Monthly chart performance for "Walking Away"
Chart (2025)	Peak position
Lithuania Airplay (TopHit)	55

== Certifications ==
Certifications for "Walking Away"
Region	Certification	Certified units/sales
Brazil (Pro-Música Brasil)	Platinum	40,000^{‡}
Canada (Music Canada)	Gold	40,000^{‡}
^{‡} Sales+streaming figures based on certification alone.
