= First Place (song) =

Single by Justin Bieber

from the album Swag
- Released: July 11, 2025
- Genre: R&B
- Length: 3:20
- Label: Def Jam; ILH
- Songwriters: Justin Bieber; Eddie Benjamin; Carter Lang; Dylan Wiggins; Kevin Rhomberg; Tobias Jesso Jr.; Jackson Morgan; Daniel Chetrit
- Producers: Benjamin; Lang; Wiggins; Knox Fortune

Justin Bieber singles chronology
"Yukon" (2025)	"First Place" (2025)	"Love Song" (2025)

Music video
- "First Place" on YouTube

"First Place" is a song by Canadian singer Justin Bieber. It was released through Def Jam Recordings and ILH Productions as the third single from his seventh studio album, Swag, on August 13, 2025. Bieber wrote the song with producers Eddie Benjamin, Carter Lang, Dylan Wiggins, and Knox Fortune, alongside Tobias Jesso Jr., Jackson Morgan, and Daniel Chetrit.

== Composition and critical reception ==
"First Place" sees Bieber reflecting on how he ended up in his position and who comes in "first place" in his life over an upbeat instrumental. Bieber's sound in the song was compared to that of Michael Jackson with its sonic elements and Bieber's emotional lyrics joining to show his vulnerability. He uses melisma in the song, with its drums being described as "hyperactive" and "washed-out". Bieber admits that he has issues about feeling mentally stuck, which he describes with the line: "You can't spread your wings in a bird cage". Lyndsey Havens of Billboard ranked it fourteenth among the album's tracks, saying that the song "doesn't quite hit the mark — and maybe should’ve hit the cutting room floor".

== Music video ==
The official music video for "First Place", directed by Rory Kramer, was released on August 13, 2025. A black-and-white visual, it was shot in Northern Iceland, where Bieber recorded songs for Swag, the parent album that the song appears on. He and his musical collaborators are seen in Flóki Studios, which is located on the Trollaskagi Peninsula in the country and sees the group working on music in a cabin in the mountains. It starts with Bieber eating a snack as he leaves a building called Samvinnufélag Fljótamanna and takes a walk by the water. He records vocals and then listens to his takes of the recordings in the middle while smoking as he goes down slopes on a snowboard and climbs a roof of a building near the beach. He later takes off all his clothes except for a white pair of boxer briefs and takes a swim in the water at night, shivering when he gets out. Bieber promoted the video with the caption "forgive my chicken legs", in reference to his legs being thin.

== Charts ==
Chart performance for "First Place"
Chart (2025)	Peak position
Australia (ARIA)	13
Canada Hot 100 (Billboard)	52
Global 200 (Billboard)	69
US Billboard Hot 100	59
