= Yukon (song) =

Single by Justin Bieber

from the album Swag
- Released: July 22, 2025
- Length: 2:43
- Label: Def Jam; ILH
- Songwriters: Justin Bieber; Dijon Duenas; Carter Lang; Dylan Wiggins; Daniel Chetrit; Tauheed Epps; Marshall Mathers III; Kejuan Muchita; David White; John Medora; Robert Crawford; Michael Crawford
- Producers: Dijon; Lang; Wiggins; Chetrit

Justin Bieber singles chronology
"Daisies" (2025)	"Yukon" (2025)	"First Place" (2025)

Music video
- "Yukon" on YouTube

"Yukon" is a song by Canadian singer Justin Bieber. It was sent to US rhythmic radio through Def Jam Recordings and ILH Productions as the second single from his seventh studio album, Swag, on July 22, 2025. Bieber wrote the song with producers Dijon Duenas, Carter Lang, Dylan Wiggins, and Daniel Chetrit, as well as 2 Chainz, who performs adlibs on the track. Eminem, Havoc, David White, John Medora, and Michael Crawford are additionally credited as songwriters due to an interpolation of the former's song, "Untitled". Bieber performed the song live for the first time at the 68th Annual Grammy Awards on February 1, 2026, where it was nominated for Best R&B Performance.

== Composition ==
"Yukon" was described by as one of the songs from Swag that "seem like real-time ruminations that often occupy Bieber's mind". An R&B song that features adlibs from 2 Chainz, its tone was compared to the music of SZA and Bieber's high-pitched vocals were compared to those of Frank Ocean on his album Blonde (2016).

== Critical reception ==
Yannik Gölz of Laut.de felt that it "is emblematic of the entire project: a simple, effective pop formula, enhanced with just the right amount of understatedly interesting ideas". Adam White of The Independent described it as "a jittery slice of SZA-style melancholy, Bieber's voice pitched so high that you could swear a guest vocalist has been left unbilled on the tracklist". Lyndsey Havens of Billboard ranked it eleventh among the album's tracks, saying that "if it wasn't included on his own album, it may be hard to guess that 'Yukon' is a Bieber track", but "save for his own backing vocals, which are undeniably JB".

== Accolades ==
Award Show	Edition	Category	Result
Grammy Awards	68th	Best R&B Performance	Nominated
MTV Video Music Awards	43rd	Best R&B	Nominated
Soul Train Music Awards	2026	R&B/Soul Song of The Year	Pending

== Release ==
"Yukon" was sent to U.S. rhythmic radio stations by Def Jam Recordings and ILH Productions on July 22, 2025, as the second single from Swag. On September 19, SZA teased on Instagram that she would appear on a remix of the song, posting a screenshot of her notes app showing her verse.

== Charts ==
=== Weekly charts ===
Weekly chart performance for "Yukon"
Chart (2025–2026)	Peak position
Australia (ARIA)	13
Brazil Hot 100 (Billboard)	70
Canada Hot 100 (Billboard)	8
Canada CHR/Top 40 (Billboard)	6
Costa Rica Anglo Airplay (Monitor Latino)	12
Denmark (Tracklisten)	19
Global 200 (Billboard)	14
Greece International (IFPI)	27
Guatemala Anglo Airplay (Monitor Latino)	10
Ireland (IRMA)	16
Lithuania (AGATA)	73
Lithuania Airplay (TopHit)	48
Mexico Anglo Airplay (Monitor Latino)	16
Netherlands (Single Top 100)	58
New Zealand (Recorded Music NZ)	12
Norway (IFPI Norge)	38
Philippines (Philippines Hot 100)	48
Sweden (Sverigetopplistan)	31
Switzerland (Schweizer Hitparade)	44
Taiwan (Billboard)	16
UK Singles (Official Charts)	12
UK Hip Hop/R&B (Official Charts)	2
US Billboard Hot 100	12
US Adult Pop Airplay (Billboard)	27
US Hot R&B/Hip-Hop Songs (Billboard)	3
US Pop Airplay (Billboard)	2
US Rhythmic Airplay (Billboard)	1

=== Monthly charts ===
Monthly chart performance for "Yukon"
Chart (2025)	Peak position
Lithuania Airplay (TopHit)	67

=== Year-end charts ===
Year-end chart performance for "Yukon"
Chart (2025)	Position
Canada (Canadian Hot 100)	82
US Hot R&B/Hip-Hop Songs (Billboard)	26
US Rhythmic Airplay (Billboard)	39

== Certifications ==
Certifications for "Yukon"
Region	Certification	Certified units/sales
Australia (ARIA)	2× Platinum	140,000^{‡}
Brazil (Pro-Música Brasil)	2× Platinum	80,000^{‡}
Canada (Music Canada)	Platinum	80,000^{‡}
Denmark (IFPI Danmark)	Gold	45,000^{‡}
New Zealand (RMNZ)	Platinum	30,000^{‡}
Portugal (AFP)	Gold	12,000^{‡}
United Kingdom (BPI)	Gold	400,000^{‡}
United States (RIAA)	2× Platinum	2,000,000^{‡}
^{‡} Sales+streaming figures based on certification alone.

== Release history ==
Release history for "Yukon"
Region	Date	Format(s)	Label(s)	Ref.
United States	July 22, 2025	Rhythmic contemporary radio	Def Jam	
Various	September 12, 2025	Streaming	Def Jam	
