= Daisies (Justin Bieber song) =

2025 single by Justin Bieber

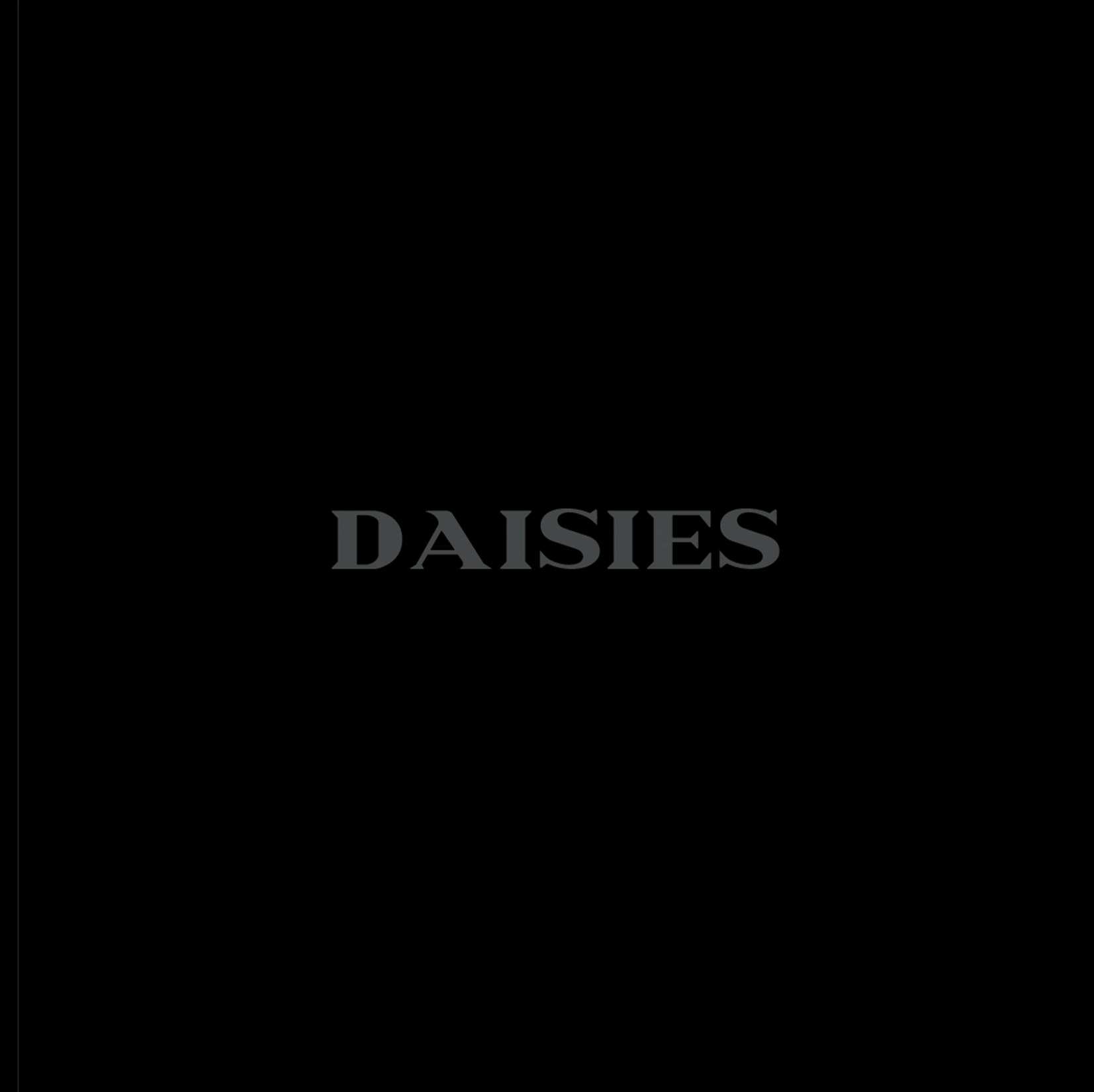
- A black square with the word DAISIES in the center, stylized in all-caps

Single by Justin Bieber

from the album Swag
- Released: July 14, 2025
- Genre: Alternative pop
- Length: 2:56
- Label: Def Jam
- Songwriters: Justin Bieber; Dijon Duenas; Michael Gordon; Eddie Benjamin; Carter Lang; Dylan Wiggins; Daniel Chetrit; Tobias Jesso Jr.
- Producers: Dijon; Mk.gee; Eddie Benjamin; Carter Lang; Dylan Wiggins; Daniel Chetrit

Justin Bieber singles chronology
"Snooze" (acoustic) (2023)	"Daisies" (2025)	"Yukon" (2025)

Audio video
- "Daisies" on YouTube

"Daisies" is a song by Canadian singer Justin Bieber. It was sent to radio airplay as the lead single from Bieber's seventh studio album, Swag, on July 14, 2025. He wrote the song with producers Dijon, Mk.gee, Eddie Benjamin, Carter Lang, Dylan Wiggins, and Daniel Chetrit, alongside Tobias Jesso Jr. It is an alternative pop song that highlights simple lo-fi production. The track charted within the top five in many countries including reaching number one in the United Kingdom, Australia, New Zealand, Iceland, and Estonia. "Daisies" debuted at number one on both the United States and Global Spotify charts. The song was nominated for Best Pop Solo Performance at the 68th Annual Grammy Awards on February 1, 2026.

== Composition ==
"Daisies" was described as an alternative pop track that features a lo-fi electric guitar, drums, and a "vintage doo-wop chord progression". The singer's signature "sweet and smooth R&B" style is balanced by a "chugging guitar and crashing percussion". Infused with a "groovy vibe", the song draws inspiration from Bieber's love life and the accompanying insecurities. “Daisies” is a love song. The singer occasionally feels uncertain and doubtful in his love but remains committed to overcoming the hardships, ultimately finding clarity and longing to reunite with his significant other.

== Reception ==
Ranking all the album's tracks, Billboard's Lyndsey Havens placed "Daisies" first, saying it transports the listener to an "intimate" setting where the song might have been recorded, somewhere "small, comforting, and likely hazy". According to Havens, Bieber has never "sounded more real". Yannik Gölz at Laut.de described the song as an absolute "highlight track" for its "folky and organic" sound and "catchy" structure, drawing comparisons to the music of Fleetwood Mac. Upon its release, Bieber's former manager Scooter Braun called "Daisies" his favourite song on the album.

== Track listing ==
- 7" vinyl
1. "Daisies" – 2:56
2. "Daisies" (instrumental) – 2:56

== Charts ==
=== Weekly charts ===
Weekly chart performance for "Daisies"
Chart (2025–2026)	Peak position
Argentina Anglo Airplay (Monitor Latino)	9
Australia (ARIA)	1
Austria (Ö3 Austria Top 40)	8
Belgium (Ultratop 50 Flanders)	10
Belgium (Ultratop 50 Wallonia)	38
Bolivia Anglo Airplay (Monitor Latino)	7
Brazil Hot 100 (Billboard)	36
Canada Hot 100 (Billboard)	2
Canada AC (Billboard)	2
Canada CHR/Top 40 (Billboard)	1
Canada Hot AC (Billboard)	1
Central America Anglo Airplay (Monitor Latino)	3
Chile Airplay (Monitor Latino)	20
Colombia Anglo Airplay (National-Report)	2
CIS Airplay (TopHit)	70
Costa Rica Anglo Airplay (Monitor Latino)	8
Croatia International Airplay (Top lista)	3
Czech Republic Singles Digital (ČNS IFPI)	80
Denmark (Tracklisten)	3
Dominican Republic Anglo Airplay (Monitor Latino)	1
Ecuador Anglo Airplay (Monitor Latino)	2
El Salvador Anglo Airplay (Monitor Latino)	2
Estonia Airplay (TopHit)	1
Finland Airplay (Radiosoittolista)	28
France (SNEP)	111
Germany (GfK)	22
Global 200 (Billboard)	3
Greece International (IFPI)	6
Guatemala Anglo Airplay (Monitor Latino)	1
Honduras Anglo Airplay (Monitor Latino)	10
Hong Kong (Billboard)	9
Hungary (Editors' Choice Top 40)	38
Iceland (Tónlistinn)	1
India International (IMI)	12
Ireland (IRMA)	2
Israel International Airplay (Media Forest)	8
Italy (FIMI)	65
Jamaica Airplay (JAMMS)	7
Japan Hot 100 (Billboard)	90
Latin America Anglo Airplay (Monitor Latino)	2
Lebanon (Lebanese Top 20)	2
Lithuania (AGATA)	24
Lithuania Airplay (TopHit)	12
Luxembourg (Billboard)	10
Malaysia (IFPI)	12
Malaysia International (RIM)	8
Malta Airplay (Radiomonitor)	3
Mexico Airplay (Monitor Latino)	10
Netherlands (Dutch Top 40)	2
Netherlands (Single Top 100)	6
New Zealand (Recorded Music NZ)	1
Nigeria (TurnTable Top 100)	62
Norway (VG-lista)	4
Panama Airplay (Monitor Latino)	3
Panama International (PRODUCE)	9
Paraguay Anglo Airplay (Monitor Latino)	2
Peru Anglo Airplay (Monitor Latino)	6
Philippines (IFPI)	4
Philippines (Philippines Hot 100)	3
Puerto Rico Anglo Airplay (Monitor Latino)	1
San Marino Airplay (SMRTV Top 50)	23
Singapore (RIAS)	5
Slovakia Airplay (ČNS IFPI)	30
Slovakia Singles Digital (ČNS IFPI)	38
Slovenia Airplay (Radiomonitor)	13
South Africa Airplay (TOSAC)	1
South Africa Streaming (TOSAC)	26
South Korea (Circle)	102
Spain (Promusicae)	75
Suriname (Nationale Top 40)	1
Sweden (Sverigetopplistan)	3
Switzerland (Schweizer Hitparade)	4
Taiwan (Billboard)	2
United Arab Emirates (IFPI)	5
UK Singles (Official Charts)	1
Uruguay Anglo Airplay (Monitor Latino)	7
US Billboard Hot 100	2
US Adult Contemporary (Billboard)	9
US Adult Pop Airplay (Billboard)	2
US Pop Airplay (Billboard)	1
US Rhythmic Airplay (Billboard)	4
Venezuela Airplay (Record Report)	37

=== Monthly charts ===
Monthly chart performance
Chart (2025)	Peak position
CIS Airplay (TopHit)	71
Estonia Airplay (TopHit)	4
Lithuania Airplay (TopHit)	16
South Korea (Circle)	151

=== Year-end charts ===
Year-end chart performance
Chart (2025)	Position
Argentina Anglo Airplay (Monitor Latino)	60
Australia (ARIA)	34
Austria (Ö3 Austria Top 40)	75
Belgium (Ultratop 50 Flanders)	51
Canada (Canadian Hot 100)	32
Canada AC (Billboard)	33
Canada CHR/Top 40 (Billboard)	25
Canada Hot AC (Billboard)	33
Estonia Airplay (TopHit)	10
Global 200 (Billboard)	123
Iceland (Tónlistinn)	12
Lithuania Airplay (TopHit)	121
Netherlands (Dutch Top 40)	21
Netherlands (Single Top 100)	53
New Zealand (Recorded Music NZ)	27
Philippines (Philippines Hot 100)	35
Switzerland (Schweizer Hitparade)	80
UK Singles (OCC)	79
US Billboard Hot 100	60
US Adult Pop Airplay (Billboard)	35
US Pop Airplay (Billboard)	27

== Certifications ==
Certifications for "Daisies"
Region	Certification	Certified units/sales
Australia (ARIA)	2× Platinum	140,000^{‡}
Austria (IFPI Austria)	Gold	15,000^{‡}
Belgium (BRMA)	Platinum	40,000^{‡}
Brazil (Pro-Música Brasil)	Diamond	160,000^{‡}
Canada (Music Canada)	3× Platinum	240,000^{‡}
Denmark (IFPI Danmark)	Platinum	90,000^{‡}
France (SNEP)	Gold	100,000^{‡}
New Zealand (RMNZ)	3× Platinum	90,000^{‡}
Portugal (AFP)	Platinum	25,000^{‡}
Spain (Promusicae)	Gold	50,000^{‡}
United Kingdom (BPI)	Platinum	600,000^{‡}
Streaming
Greece (IFPI Greece)	Gold	1,000,000^{†}
Slovakia (ČNS IFPI)	Gold	850,000^{†}
^{‡} Sales+streaming figures based on certification alone.^{†} Streaming-only figures based on certification alone.

== Release history ==
Release history for "Daisies"
Region	Date	Format(s)	Label(s)	Ref.
Italy	July 14, 2025	Radio airplay	Island	
United States	July 15, 2025	Contemporary hit radio	Def Jam; Republic	
United States	October 7, 2025	Rhythmic contemporary radio	Def Jam; Republic	
Various	December 5, 2025	7-inch vinyl	Def Jam	
