= Swag (Justin Bieber album) =

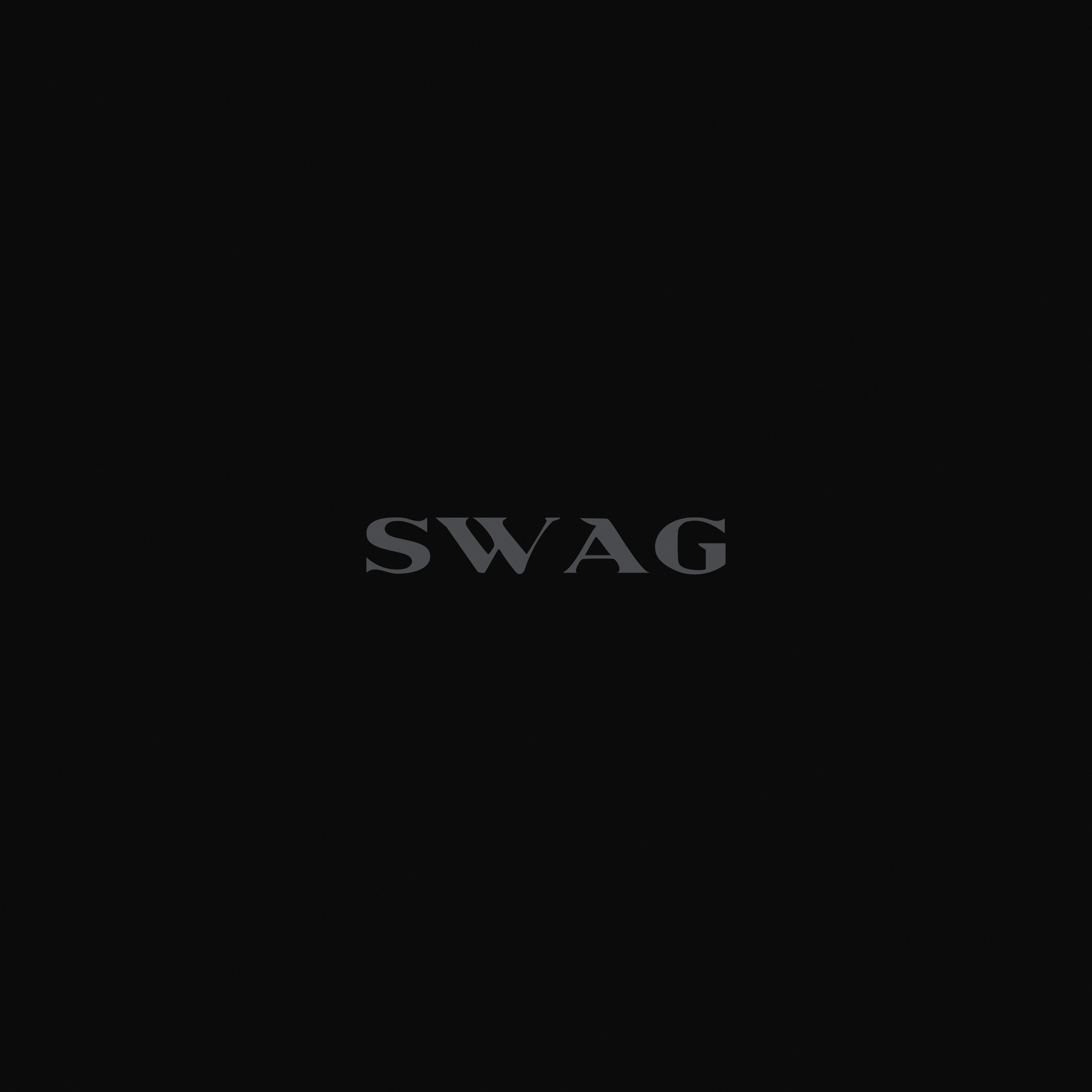

Studio album by Justin Bieber
- Released: July 11, 2025
- Genres: R&B; synth-pop
- Length: 54:11
- Labels: ILH; Def Jam
- Producers: Justin Bieber; Carter Lang; Daniel Caesar; Daniel Chetrit; Dijon; Dylan Wiggins; Eddie Benjamin; Eli Teplin; Harv; Knox Fortune; Mk.gee

Justin Bieber chronology
Freedom (2021)	Swag (2025)	Swag II (2025)

Singles from Swag
- 1. "Daisies" Released: July 14, 2025; 2. "Yukon" Released: July 22, 2025; 3. "First Place" Released: August 13, 2025

Swag (stylized as SWAG) is the seventh studio album by Canadian singer Justin Bieber. It was released through Def Jam Recordings and ILH Productions on July 11, 2025. The album contains guest appearances from Gunna, Druski, Dijon, Lil B, Sexyy Red, Cash Cobain, Eddie Benjamin, and Marvin Winans. Production was handled by Bieber, Dijon, and Benjamin themselves, alongside Carter Lang, Dylan Wiggins, Daniel Chetrit, Mk.gee, Eli Teplin, Knox Fortune, Daniel Caesar, and Harv.

An R&B and synth-pop album, Swag serves as a follow-up to Bieber's previous album, Justice, and his second extended play, Freedom, both of which were released in 2021. A sequel of the album, titled Swag II, was released on September 5, 2025. In support of both albums, Bieber performed a cellphone-free private concert at the Roxy Theatre in West Hollywood, California, on March 29, 2026, where he performed 25 tracks from both albums, making the live debuts for all but three of the tracks.

Upon release, Swag was met with generally positive reviews from music critics. The album peaked at number one in Austria, Belgium, Canada, Denmark, Iceland, the Netherlands, Norway, Portugal, and Switzerland, while reaching the top 10 in Australia, Germany, Japan, New Zealand, Spain, Sweden, the United Kingdom, and the United States. It was supported by three singles: "Daisies", "Yukon", and "First Place". The album received four nominations at the 68th Annual Grammy Awards.

== Background ==
On May 2, 2022, Justin Bieber revealed in an interview with Apple Music presenter Ebro Darden that his upcoming seventh studio album was nearly complete and would be released soon. During the interview, he also confirmed that guitarist John Mayer would contribute to the project, having recorded a guitar solo for one of its songs.

In August 2022, American singer Bryson Tiller revealed in an interview with REVOLT that he had submitted a verse for a song with Bieber that was expected to be released soon. In September 2023, Tiller shared a photograph on Instagram that appeared to reference Bieber in a list of potential collaborators.

In March 2023, English singer-songwriter Ed Sheeran revealed in an interview with Rolling Stone that he had recorded a duet with Bieber, describing it as a "lighters-up power ballad". The song was produced by Andrew Watt and was intended for Bieber's upcoming album.

On January 10, 2025, journalist Matthew Belloni reported in his What I'm Hearing newsletter for Puck that Bieber might return to music during the year. Belloni wrote that Bieber wanted to resume working and suggested that financial considerations, including expenses related to his cancelled tour, could be among the factors behind a possible return.

== Production and promotion ==
In January 2024, Justin Bieber posted a series of photos of himself performing alongside other musicians in a recording studio on his Instagram account. During the first half of 2025, he shared several pictures of himself recording new music and playing instruments on Instagram, along with some cryptic captions that possibly hinted at new music to be released soon. Bieber announced that April that recording the album had finished during his vacation to Iceland, and subsequently shared photos from a recording studio through Instagram stories. Ahead of the album's release, Bieber hosted studio sessions at his home in Los Angeles earlier that year with Carter Lang, Eddie Benjamin, and DJ Tay James. On July 10, 2025, billboards that had the word "swag" written appeared in various locations around the world, including Reykjavík, Iceland; Los Angeles, California; Atlanta, Georgia; and Cambridge, Ontario, the former of which Bieber visited while recording songs for the album. The twenty-song tracklist was revealed on a billboard in Times Square in Manhattan, New York, which did not include the song "Standing on Business", a collaboration with American comedian and actor Druski, at the time.

The album's lead single, "Daisies", was sent to Italian radio airplay stations four days later and debuted at number two on the Billboard Hot 100. Its second single, "Yukon", was sent to US rhythmic radio on July 22 and debuted at number 17 on the Hot 100, with its official music video being released on August 5. "First Place" was released as the album's third and final single along with its official music video on August 13, 2025.

== Recording ==
In January 2025, Bieber shared photographs of himself recording music with record producers Carter Lang and Eddie Benjamin. During the first half of the year, he also shared several photographs and videos of himself recording music on social media.

In April 2025, Bieber travelled to Iceland to work on the album, hosting recording sessions with several collaborators. The sessions included work at his home in Los Angeles and in Iceland.

== Promotion ==
On July 10, 2025, promotional billboards featuring a photograph of Bieber and the album title Swag appeared in several locations, including Reykjavík, Iceland, Los Angeles, California, and Atlanta, Georgia.

Bieber subsequently shared photographs and videos of the promotional material on social media. A display featuring the album's track listing also appeared in Times Square, Manhattan, New York City.

On July 10, The Hollywood Reporter confirmed that Bieber would release the album the following day. The report also revealed that the album would feature guest appearances from Sexyy Red, Cash Cobain, and Gunna.

== Release ==
Swag was released as a surprise album on July 11, 2025, through Def Jam Recordings and ILH Productions. It was made available on digital streaming platforms without any advance singles or a traditional pre-release promotional campaign.

The album was initially made available digitally, with physical CD and vinyl editions offered for purchase through Bieber's official website. A cassette edition was subsequently made available, with a listed release date of September 5, 2025.

Despite its initial surprise release, the album was subsequently supported by three singles. "Daisies" was released as the lead single on July 14, 2025, followed by "Yukon" on July 22 and "First Place" on August 13.

== Critical reception ==
Swag ratings
Aggregate scores
Source	Rating
AnyDecentMusic?	6.4/10
Metacritic	67/100
Review scores
Source	Rating
AllMusic	3/5 stars
Clash	7/10
Consequence	C+
The Daily Telegraph	2/5 stars
Evening Standard	2/5 stars
The Guardian	3/5 stars
The Independent	2/5 stars
Rolling Stone	4/5 stars
Pitchfork	7.3/10

According to the review aggregator Metacritic, Swag received "generally favorable reviews" based on a weighted average score of 67 out of 100 from 15 critic scores. Brady Brickner-Wood of The New Yorker has praised the album saying, "Bieber has never sounded this wild, this expansive, this connected to something true." AllMusic commented that "With rare exception, Swag is about doe-eyed seduction, loyalty, humility, and faith. Moreover, "Swag" itself hardly shows Bieber embracing the term as he did in the early 2010s". Clash described the record as one that "broadly sits on 90s-adjacent synth pop – sometimes fixed in its approach, sometimes vaporised. It’s always colourful, and – for all its breadth – it’s always entertaining." In contrast, The Independent offered a negative assessment, stating that "outside of his hardcore devotees, Bieber remains more of a curiosity than a consistent, coherent creative force – Swag won’t do much to change the conversation." The Evening Standard wrote that "There is not a new sound or a new approach, this is pretty much Bieber as usual, only more so: 21 tracks of lightly personal R&B balladry that will please his fans but won’t convert anyone else".

== Commercial performance ==
In the United States, Swag debuted at number two on the US Billboard 200 with 163,000 album-equivalent units, consisting of 198.77 million on-demand streams, his biggest career streaming week, and 6,000 pure sales in its first week. The album became Bieber's 11th top-ten entry on the chart, but also became his first studio album to miss the top spot. Its lead single, "Daisies", simultaneously debuted at number two on the Billboard Hot 100. The album entered at number one in Canada, while also reaching the top spot in Austria, Belgium's Ultratop Flanders chart, Denmark, the Netherlands, Iceland, Norway, Portugal, and Switzerland.

== Track listing ==
Swag track listing
No.	Title	Writer(s)	Producer(s)	Length
1.	"All I Can Take"	Justin Bieber; Eddie Benjamin; Carter Lang; Dylan Wiggins; Daniel Chetrit; Tobias Jesso Jr.; Jackson Morgan	Bieber; Benjamin; Lang; Wiggins; Chetrit	4:07
2.	"Daisies"	Bieber; Dijon Duenas; Michael Gordon; Lang; Wiggins; Benjamin; Chetrit; Jesso	Dijon; Mk.gee; Lang; Wiggins; Benjamin; Chetrit	2:56
3.	"Yukon"	Bieber; Duenas; Lang; Wiggins; Chetrit; Tauheed Epps; Marshall Mathers III; Kejuan Muchita; David White; John Medora; Robert Crawford; Michael Crawford	Dijon; Lang; Wiggins; Chetrit	2:43
4.	"Go Baby"	Bieber; Benjamin; Lang; Wiggins; Eli Teplin; Jesso; Morgan; Chetrit	Benjamin; Lang; Wiggins; Teplin	3:14
5.	"Things You Do"	Bieber; Lang; Duenas	Lang; Dijon	1:48
6.	"Butterflies"	Bieber; Benjamin; Lang; Wiggins; Benjamin; Chetrit; Jesso; Morgan	Bieber; Lang; Wiggins; Benjamin; Chetrit	3:13
7.	"Way It Is" (with Gunna)	Bieber; Sergio Kitchens; Lang; Wiggins; Benjamin; Jesso; Morgan; Chetrit	Lang; Wiggins	3:15
8.	"First Place"	Bieber; Benjamin; Lang; Wiggins; Kevin Rhomberg; Jesso; Morgan; Chetrit	Bieber; Benjamin; Lang; Wiggins; Knox Fortune	3:20
9.	"Soulful" (with Druski)	Bieber; Drew Desbordes	Benjamin; Lang; Wiggins	0:36
10.	"Walking Away"	Bieber; Lang; Wiggins; Jesso; Morgan; Chetrit	Bieber; Benjamin; Lang; Wiggins	4:04
11.	"Glory Voice Memo"	Bieber; Lang; Wiggins; Chetrit	Lang; Wiggins; Chetrit	1:24
12.	"Devotion" (with Dijon)	Bieber; Duenas; Ashton Simmonds; Lang; Wiggins; Chetrit	Dijon; Daniel Caesar; Lang; Wiggins; Chetrit	3:54
13.	"Dadz Love" (with Lil B)	Bieber; Brandon McCartney; Lang; Wiggins; Rhomberg; Chetrit	Lang; Wiggins; Knox Fortune; Chetrit	2:25
14.	"Therapy Session" (with Druski)	Bieber; Desbordes	Benjamin; Lang; Wiggins	1:18
15.	"Sweet Spot" (with Sexyy Red)	Bieber; Janae Wherry; James Harris III; Terry Lewis; Elmer Bernstein; Benjamin; Lang; Wiggins; Jesso; Morgan; Chetrit	Benjamin; Lang; Wiggins	3:05
16.	"Standing on Business" (with Druski)	Bieber; Desbordes	Benjamin; Lang; Wiggins	0:50
17.	"405"	Bieber; Benjamin; Lang; Wiggins; Jesso; Morgan; Chetrit	Bieber; Benjamin; Lang; Wiggins	3:32
18.	"Swag" (with Cash Cobain and Eddie Benjamin)	Bieber; Cashmere Small; Lang; Wiggins	Lang; Wiggins	2:30
19.	"Zuma House"	Bieber; Lang	Bieber; Lang	1:23
20.	"Too Long"	Bieber; Benjamin; Bernard Harvey; Lang; Wiggins; Jesso; Morgan; Chetrit	Benjamin; Harv; Lang; Wiggins	3:04
21.	"Forgiveness" (performed by Marvin Winans)	Rick Founds	Maejor	1:30
Total length:				54:11

Notes

- "Yukon" contains an interpolation of "Untitled", written by Marshall Mathers, Kejuan Muchita, Michael Crawford, John Medora and David White, and performed by Eminem.
- "Sweet Spot" contains interpolations of:
  - "Can You Stand the Rain", written by James Harris III and Terry Lewis, and performed by New Edition.
  - "Theme from The Magnificent Seven", written by Elmer Bernstein.

== Personnel ==
Credits adapted from Tidal.

=== Musicians ===
- Justin Bieber – vocals (tracks 1–20), additional vocals (21)
- Jackson Lee Morgan – background vocals (1)
- 2 Chainz – background vocals (3)
- Gunna – vocals (7)
- Eddie Benjamin – background vocals (7), vocals (18), vocal director (1–10, 15–20)
- Druski – vocals (9, 14, 16)
- Ashton Simmonds – background vocals, bass (12)
- Dijon – vocals (12)
- Lil B – vocals (13)
- Robert M. Crawford – vocals (13)
- Sexyy Red – vocals (15)
- Cash Cobain – vocals (18)

=== Technical ===
- Josh Gudwin – mixing (1–10, 12–21)
- Neal Pogue – mixing (1)
- Dale Becker – mastering (1–10, 12–21)
- Felix Byrne – mastering (11), engineering (1–12, 14–21), mixing assistance (all tracks)
- Florian "Flo" Ongonga – engineering (7)
- Justin Bieber – engineering (11)
- Denis Kosiak – engineering (13)
- Frank Lookinland – engineering (1–20)
- Mark Parfitt – engineering (5)
- Zeke Mishanec – engineering (3)
- Katie Harvey – mastering assistance
- Kegn Venegas – mastering assistance
- Noah McCorkle – mastering assistance
- JD – sound design

== Charts ==
=== Weekly charts ===
Chart performance
Chart (2025–2026)	Peak position
Australian Albums (ARIA)	2
Austrian Albums (Ö3 Austria)	1
Belgian Albums (Ultratop Flanders)	1
Belgian Albums (Ultratop Wallonia)	6
Canadian Albums (Billboard)	1
Croatian International Albums (HDU)	36
Czech Albums (ČNS IFPI)	12
Danish Albums (Hitlisten)	1
Dutch Albums (Album Top 100)	1
Finnish Albums (Suomen virallinen lista)	19
French Albums (SNEP)	10
German Albums (Offizielle Top 100)	6
Hungarian Albums (MAHASZ)	6
Icelandic Albums (Tónlistinn)	1
Irish Albums (Official Charts)	2
Italian Albums (FIMI)	14
Japanese Combined Albums (Oricon)	15
Japanese Western Albums (Oricon)	22
Japanese Hot Albums (Billboard Japan)	5
Lithuanian Albums (AGATA)	12
New Zealand Albums (RMNZ)	2
Nigerian Albums (TurnTable)	20
Norwegian Albums (VG-lista)	1
Polish Albums (ZPAV)	22
Portuguese Albums (AFP)	1
Scottish Albums (Official Charts)	92
Slovak Albums (ČNS IFPI)	4
Spanish Albums (Promusicae)	8
Swedish Albums (Sverigetopplistan)	3
Swiss Albums (Schweizer Hitparade)	1
UK Albums (Official Charts)	4
UK R&B Albums (Official Charts)	3
US Billboard 200	2
US Top R&B/Hip-Hop Albums (Billboard)	1

=== Year-end charts ===
Year-end chart performance for Swag
Chart (2025)	Position
Australian Albums (ARIA)	39
Belgian Albums (Ultratop Flanders)	89
Canadian Albums (Billboard)	41
Danish Albums (Hitlisten)	8
Dutch Albums (Album Top 100)	20
Icelandic Albums (Tónlistinn)	64
New Zealand Albums (RMNZ)	18
Swiss Albums (Schweizer Hitparade)	46
US Billboard 200	78
US Top R&B/Hip-Hop Albums (Billboard)	26

== Certifications ==
Certifications
Region	Certification	Certified units/sales
Canada (Music Canada)	Platinum	80,000^{‡}
Denmark (IFPI Danmark)	Platinum	20,000^{‡}
Italy (FIMI)	Gold	25,000^{‡}
New Zealand (RMNZ)	2× Platinum	30,000^{‡}
Portugal (AFP)	Gold	3,500^{‡}
United Kingdom (BPI)	Gold	100,000^{‡}
United States (RIAA)	Platinum	1,000,000^{‡}
^{‡} Sales+streaming figures based on certification alone.

== Awards and nominations ==
Year	Award	Category	Result
2026	Grammy Awards	Album of the Year	Nominated
2026	Grammy Awards	Best Pop Vocal Album	Nominated

== Accolades ==
Publication	List	Rank
CBS	The 10 Best Canadian Albums of 2025	2
The New York Times	Best Albums of 2025	3
Complex	The 50 Best Albums of 2025	4
Los Angeles Times	The 25 Best Albums of 2025	10
Pitchfork	The 30 Best Pop Albums of 2025	13
Billboard	The Best 50 Albums of 2025	13
Yahoo	What Were The Best 25 Albums of 2025?	13
Dazed	The 20 Best Albums of 2025	15
Rolling Stone	The 100 Best Albums of 2025	20
Faded	The 50 Best Albums of 2025	22
PopMatters	The 25 Best Pop Albums of 2025	24
Elle	The Best Albums of 2025	Listed
Us Weekly	The Best Albums of 2025	Listed

== Other distinctions ==
- Swag was Bieber's first studio album released without the management and executive production involvement of Scooter Braun.
- It was Bieber's first studio album with an entirely capitalized title. Previously, he had released the song "PYD" in 2013, which also used an entirely capitalized title.
- The album was released 1,575 days after Justice, making it the longest gap between Bieber's studio albums at the time.
- It was Bieber's first studio album whose cover artwork did not feature him. His previous projects without his appearance on the cover included Journals (2013) and Freedom (2021).
- Swag accumulated approximately 74.5 million streams on Spotify on its first day, surpassing the first-day streaming total of Justice, which accumulated approximately 48.3 million streams.
