= Freedom (EP) =

EP by Justin Bieber
- Released: April 4, 2021
- Recorded: April 1–3, 2021
- Genre: Gospel; R&B; pop soul
- Length: 22:20
- Label: Def Jam
- Producer: Angel Lopez; Boi-1da; Cvre; Don Mills; Federico Vindver; Goatsmans; Sean Momberger; JulesTheWulf; Justin Bieber; Lee Major; Wallis Lane; Vinylz

Justin Bieber chronology
Justice (2021)	Freedom (2021)	Swag (2025)

Freedom is the second extended play by the Canadian singer Justin Bieber. It is also the first EP released by Bieber since My World (2009). It was surprise-released on April 4, 2021, by Def Jam Recordings. The EP is a follow-up to Bieber's sixth studio album Justice, released a few weeks prior on March 19, 2021. The EP is gospel-inspired.

== Background and songs ==
Freedom is a gospel-inspired EP that serves as Bieber's way of professing his love to God as he embarks on a soul-searching journey to better understand himself and his past through the lens of his religious beliefs. The EP begins with the Afrobeat-filled title track, a collaboration with Beam, where Bieber and Beam address temptation against laid-back tropical beats. On the following tracks, "All She Wrote" featuring Brandon Love and Chandler Moore and R&B cut "We're in This Together", Bieber shifts into rap, discussing his fame and "needing saving", with the latter alluding to the 2014 police raid of his Los Angeles home after being accused of allegedly egging a neighbor's house and ending with a prayer for those listening and their families. The fourth track, "Where You Go I Follow" featuring Moore, Pink Sweats, and Judah Smith, finds Bieber singing about the resurrection of Jesus. He is joined by Moore, Smith, and Tori Kelly on the fifth track, "Where Do I Fit In", where they sing about Jesus and his unconditional love for everyone. The final track, "Afraid to Say" featuring Lauren Walters, takes a more guitar-focused turn as Bieber explores the effects of cancel culture.

== Reception ==
=== Critical response ===
Vulture's Halle Kiefer compared Freedom to Bieber's sixth studio album, Justice, saying they both find him "ruminating on the spiritual and existential state of his existence". Emlyn Travis, writing for MTV News, felt that the EP "allows Bieber to redefine himself and restructure his future". Tomás Mier from People wrote that "Bieber is channeling his spirituality through song". Brad Wheeler of The Globe and Mail found the EP to be "mundane" and that it came off as "self-absorbed", further adding, "He's not serving somebody – he's serving himself."

=== Accolades ===
Year-end lists
Publication	Accolade	Rank	Ref.
365 Days of Inspiring Media	Top 25 EPs of 2021	21	
Louder Than The Music	LTTM Album Awards 2021	2	

== Commercial performance ==
Freedom debuted at number 172 on the US Billboard 200 chart. The EP earned 7,000 equivalent album units with less than five full days of availability in its first tracking week. It is Bieber's first entry on the Top Christian Albums chart, debuting at number three for the week of April 17, 2021. All six of the EP's tracks concurrently charted on the Hot Christian Songs chart, also becoming Bieber's first entries there.

== Track listing ==
Freedom track listing
No.	Title	Writer(s)	Producer(s)	Length
1.	"Freedom" (with Beam)	Justin Bieber; Tyshane Thompson; Jordan Douglas; Matthew Samuels; Anderson Hernandez; Jun Ha Kim; Miloš Angelov	Boi-1da; Vinylz; Cvre; Don Mills^{[b]}	2:45
2.	"All She Wrote" (featuring Brandon Love and Chandler Moore)	Bieber; Brandon Burke; Chandler Moore; Samuels; Hernandez; Sean Momberger; Leigh Elliott; Gerald Levert	Boi-1da; Vinylz; Momberger; Lee Major	3:54
3.	"We're in This Together"	Bieber; Nima Jahanbin; Paimon Jahanbin; Federico Vindver; Jose Velazquez; Isaiah Johnson	Wallis Lane; Vindver; Angel Lopez^{[a]}; DJ Alizay^{[b]}	3:01
4.	"Where You Go I Follow" (featuring Pink Sweats, Chandler Moore, and Judah Smith)	Bieber; David Bowden; Judah Smith; Jonathan Gateretse; Lenard Ishmael; Luigi Tiano; O'Necean Gordon; Tarik Henry	Goatsmans	3:32
5.	"Where Do I Fit In" (featuring Tori Kelly, Chandler Moore, and Judah Smith)	Bieber; Tori Kelly; Moore; Smith; Gateretse; Ishmael; Tiano; Gordon; Henry	Goatsmans	4:46
6.	"Afraid to Say" (featuring Lauren Walters)	Bieber; Julian McGuire	Bieber; JulesTheWulf^{[a]}	4:22
Total length:				22:20

=== Notes ===
- ^[a] signifies a co-producer
- ^[b] signifies an additional producer

== Personnel ==
Credits adapted from Tidal.

=== Musicians ===
- Justin Bieber – vocals
- Beam – additional vocals (1)
- Brandon Love – additional vocals (2)
- Chandler Moore – additional vocals (2, 5)
- Maejor – additional vocals (2)
- Pink Sweats – additional vocals (4)
- Lenard Ishmael – guitar (4)
- Jonathan Gateretse – keyboards (4, 5)
- Judah Smith – spoken word (4, 5)
- Tori Kelly – additional vocals (5)
- Tarik Henry – background vocals (5)
- Julian Mcguire – guitar (6)
- Lauren Walters – spoken word (6)

=== Technical ===
- Josh Gudwin – mixing, engineering, immersive mix engineering, vocal production
- Dale Becker – mastering
- Elijah Marrett-Hitch – engineering
- Tyree Hawkins – engineering (1)
- Devin Nakao – engineering (3)
- Tori Kelly – engineering (5)
- Ryan Lytle – recording, editing, engineering assistance
- Heidi Wang – additional engineering, mixing assistance
- Hector Vega – mastering assistance
- DJ Tay James – production coordination
- Lauren Walters – production coordination

== Charts ==
=== Weekly charts ===
Weekly chart performance
Chart (2021)	Peak position
Belgian Albums (Ultratop Flanders)	147
Swiss Albums (Schweizer Hitparade)	69
UK Christian & Gospel Albums (OCC)	3
US Billboard 200	172
US Top Christian Albums (Billboard)	3

=== Year-end charts ===
Year-end chart performance
Chart (2021)	Position
US Christian Albums (Billboard)	71
