= Carter Lang =

American producer, songwriter, and musician

- Born: Chicago, Illinois, U.S.
- Education: Loyola University New Orleans (BS)
- Genres: R&B; soul; hip hop
- Occupations: Record producer; songwriter
- Labels: Electric Feel; Warner Chappell Music

Carter Lang is an American record producer and songwriter. He is best known for his production work on SZA's albums Ctrl (2017) and SOS (2022), as well as his contributions to Chicago's burgeoning R&B/Hip-Hop scene. Lang was nominated for several Grammy Awards for his work on releases by Post Malone, Doja Cat, Lil Nas X, Justin Bieber, and Omar Apollo, and won his first two Grammys in 2024 and 2025 for his contributions to SZA's projects.

== Career ==
=== Musical origins ===
Lang, trained in classical piano and bass guitar, formed soul-influenced band "The O'My's" in 2005 with several friends in Chicago. This would lead to collaborations with local acts including Chance the Rapper, Vic Mensa, and Mick Jenkins.

=== New Orleans, return to Chicago, and SZA ===
Lang graduated high school and parted ways with his group, moving from Chicago to New Orleans to attend the Loyola University New Orleans music business program, where he was exposed to a diverse soundscape. After graduating from the Loyola College of Music & Media and returning to Chicago four years later, Lang began producing for members of Chicago Hip-Hop collective Savemoney, with whom he grew up. Lang was subsequently introduced to recording artist SZA in 2015 through a joint studio session with mutual friend Peter CottonTale, Chance The Rapper's music director. After an initial collaboration at SZA's Lollapalooza set that year, he became a member of her touring band. Lang is credited as a writer and/or producer on 8 tracks from her 2017 debut album, including hit single "Love Galore" and lead single "Drew Barrymore", recorded alongside several other tracks at his Lake Michigan cabin. Amongst productions for other artists (including "Sunflower" for Post Malone and Swae Lee), Lang resumed work with SZA, co-producing and co-writing a majority of her 2022 sophomore album SOS, including top 10 singles “Good Days”, “I Hate U”, “Nobody Gets Me”, and “Kill Bill”, which went #1 on five separate Billboard charts including the Hot 100, and held the #1 spot for 21 total weeks on the Billboard Hot R&B/Hip-Hop Songs chart. He would also work with rapper Doja Cat, creating Top 5 single "Kiss Me More" featuring SZA (later winning the Grammy Award for Best Pop Duo/Group Performance), as well as promotional single "Okloser" from her deluxe album Scarlet 2 Claude.

In 2024, Lang won his first Grammy (for Best Progressive R&B Album) as a main producer on SZA album SOS. In 2025, Lang won his second Grammy Award (in the Best R&B Song category) as a writer on SZA's lead single "Saturn" from 2024 SOS reissue Lana. In 2025, Lang was recruited to co-write and co-produce a majority of Justin Bieber's seventh studio album Swag, including standout tracks "All I Can Take" and "Daisies".

== Production and songwriting credits ==
Credits are courtesy of Discogs, Tidal, Apple Music, and AllMusic.

=== Executive-produced/co-written projects ===
Albums with ~ 50% Carter Lang production/songwriting credits or more
Album	Artist	Year	Label
Ctrl	SZA	2017	TDE | RCA Records
Ivory (Marfil) Deluxe	Omar Apollo	2022	Warner Music Group
SOS	SZA	2022	TDE | RCA Records
Lana	SZA	2024	TDE | RCA Records
Swag	Justin Bieber	2025	ILH Production Co. LLC | Def Jam Recordings
Swag II	Justin Bieber	2025	ILH Production Co. LLC | Def Jam Recordings
Swag Live From Coachella (Weekend I)	Justin Bieber	2026	ILH Production Co. LLC | Def Jam Recordings
Thank You	Mike D	2026	Capitol Records

=== Selected songwriting credits / productions ===
Title	Year	Artist	Album
"Burnout" (Featuring Eryn Allen Kane)	2014	Saba	ComfortZone
"Wanna Be Cool"	2015	Donnie Trumpet	Surf
"Just Wait"	2015	Donnie Trumpet	Surf
"All 4 You" (featuring Yuna)	2015	Kyle	Smyle
"Japanese" (featuring Twista)	2015	Alex Wiley	Village Party 2: Heavens Gate
"Addicted (Interlude)"	2015	Towkio	.Wav Theory
"Break You Off"	2015	Towkio	.Wav Theory
"How Great" (featuring Jay Electronica)	2016	Chance the Rapper	Coloring Book
"Shades of Blue"	2016	Vic Mensa	There's Alot Going On
"There's Alot Going On"	2016	Vic Mensa	There's Alot Going On
"Lonely" (featuring Lornie Chia)	2016	Jamila Woods	Heavn
"Lately"	2016	Jamila Woods	Heavn
"Holy"	2016	Jamila Woods	Heavn
"Don't Matter"	2016	Isaiah Rashad	The Sun's Tirade
"Godbody"	2016	Joey Purp	IiiDrops
"Didn't I (Say I Didn't)"	2017	Vic Mensa	The Autobiography
"I Love You So Much" (featuring Chance the Rapper)	2017	DJ Khaled	Grateful
"Thirst"	2017	Ravyn Lenae	Midnight Moonlight
"Cool" (with Alex Wiley & Calez)	2018	Mick Jenkins	Non-album single
"Sunflower"	2018	Post Malone & Swae Lee	Spider-Man: Into the Spider-Verse (soundtrack) & Hollywood's Bleeding
"Hollywood's Bleeding"	2019	Post Malone	Hollywood's Bleeding
"Small Worlds"	2019	Mac Miller	Swimming
"Wires in the Way"	2019	Sir	Chasing Summer
"Easy"	2019	Camila Cabello	Romance
"I Got You (Always and Forever)" (featuring En Vogue, Ari Lennox & Kierra Sheard)	2019	Chance the Rapper	The Big Day
"The Big Day" (featuring Francis and the Lights)	2019	Chance the Rapper	The Big Day
"Let's Go on the Run" (featuring Knox Fortune)	2019	Chance the Rapper	The Big Day
"Zanies and Fools" (featuring Darius Scott & Nicki Minaj)		Chance the Rapper	The Big Day
"Good Days"	2020	SZA	SOS
"Thin White Lies"	2020	5 Seconds of Summer	Calm
"Cinderella Story"	2020	A Boogie wit da Hoodie	Artist 2.0
"Ain't No Doubts"	2020	Rich the Kid	Boss Man
"I Want Mo"	2020	Rich the Kid & London on da Track	Boss Man
"Hi 5" (featuring Eryn Allen Kane, Grace Weber, Sing Harlem & Yebba)	2020	Peter CottonTale	Catch
"Compromise"	2020	Knox Fortune	Stock Child Wonder
"Change Up"	2020	Knox Fortune	Stock Child Wonder
"Static"	2020	Knox Fortune	Stock Child Wonder
"Kiss Me More" (featuring SZA)	2021	Doja Cat	Planet Her
"Void"	2021	Lil Nas X	Montero
"Life After Salem"	2021	Lil Nas X	Montero
"What a Life"	2021	Big Sean & Hit-Boy	What You Expect
"Feels Like"	2021	Gracie Abrams	This Is What It Feels Like
"Breath Away"	2021	24kGoldn	El Dorado
"All Pride Aside"	2021	Shelley FKA Dram & Summer Walker	Shelley FKA Dram
"In The Dark"	2021	Swae Lee & Jhené Aiko	Shang-Chi and the Legend of the Ten Rings: The Album
"Come for Me" (featuring Khalid & Lucky Daye)	2021	Alicia Keys	Keys
"The Anonymous Ones"	2021	SZA	Dear Evan Hansen Original Motion Picture Soundtrack
"I Hate U"	2021	SZA	SOS
"Love Galore" (Alt version)	2022	SZA	Ctrl (deluxe)
"Remind Me"	2022	Giveon	Give or Take
"Conversation"	2022	Muni Long	Public Displays of Affection: The Album
"Arya" (featuring ASAP Rocky)	2022	Nigo	I Know Nigo!
"Happy Hurts"	2022	Lykke Li	Eyeye
"5D"	2022	Lykke Li	Eyeye
"Okloser"	2024	Doja Cat	Scarlet 2 Claude
"¿Cómo Así?"	2024	Kali Uchis	Orquídeas
"Igual que un Ángel" (with Peso Pluma)	2024	Kali Uchis	Orquídeas
"Pensamientos Intrusivos"	2024	Kali Uchis	Orquídeas
"Mad In Love"	2024	Jennifer Lopez	This Is Me... Now
"Saturn"	2024	SZA	Lana
"False Starts"	2024	Zayn Malik	Room Under the Stairs
"Good Books"	2024	Lola Young	This Wasn't Meant for You Anyway
"Messy"	2024	Lola Young	This Wasn't Meant for You Anyway
"Crush"	2024	Lola Young	This Wasn't Meant for You Anyway
"Boy Bye"	2024	Chloë	Trouble in Paradise
"Be Careful with Me"	2024	Omar Apollo	God Said No
"Done with You"	2024	Omar Apollo	God Said No
"While U Can"	2024	Omar Apollo	God Said No
"Black Void" (with Thundercat and Eryn Allen Kane)	2024	Big Sean	Better Me Than You
"Number One Girl"	2024	Rosé	Rosie
"Drinks or Coffee"	2024	Rosé	Rosie
"What Do I Do"	2024	SZA	Lana
"Diamond Boy (DTM)"	2024	SZA	Lana
"BMF"	2024	SZA	Lana
"Love Me 4 Me"	2024	SZA	Lana
"Crybaby"	2024	SZA	Lana
"Mad"	2025	Reneé Rapp	Bite Me
"I Can't Have You Around Me Anymore"	2025	Reneé Rapp	Bite Me
"Yamaha"	2025	Dijon	Baby
"One Thing"	2025	Lola Young	I'm Only F**king Myself
"Walk All Over You"	2025	Lola Young	I'm Only F**king Myself
"Post Sex Clarity"	2025	Lola Young	I'm Only F**king Myself
"Not Like That Anymore"	2025	Lola Young	I'm Only F**king Myself
"Nearsight [SID]"	2025	Miguel	Caos
"Porcelana"	2025	Rosalía	Lux
"Back 2 Love"	2026	The Kid Laroi	Before I Forget Deluxe Edition

== Awards and nominations ==
Year	Category	Nominated work	Result	Ref.
2018	BMI Most-Performed R&B/Hip-Hop Songs	"Love Galore"	Won	
2020	Grammy Award for Record of the Year	"Sunflower"	Nominated	
2022	Grammy Award for Album of the Year	Planet Her (Deluxe)	Nominated	
2022	Grammy Award for Album of the Year	Montero	Nominated	
2022	Grammy Award for Song of the Year	"Kiss Me More"	Nominated	
2022	Grammy Award for Best R&B Song	"Good Days"	Nominated	
2022	BMI Most-Performed Pop Songs	"Kiss Me More"	Won	
2022	BMI Most-Performed R&B/Hip-Hop Songs	"Good Days"	Won	
2023	Soul Train Ashford & Simpson Songwriter's Award	"Kill Bill"	Nominated	
2023	BMI Most-Performed R&B/Hip-Hop Songs	"I Hate U"	Won	
2024	Grammy Award for Record of the Year	"Kill Bill"	Nominated	
2024	Grammy Award for Song of the Year	"Kill Bill"	Nominated	
2024	Grammy Award for Album of the Year	SOS	Nominated	
2024	Grammy Award for Best Progressive R&B Album	SOS	Won	
2024	BMI Most-Performed Pop Songs	"Kill Bill"	Won	
2024	BMI Most-Performed R&B/Hip-Hop Songs	"Nobody Gets Me"	Won	
2025	Grammy Award for Best R&B Song	"Saturn"	Won	
2025	Asian Pop Music Award for Best Composer	"Number One Girl"	Nominated	
2026	Grammy Award for Album of the Year	Swag	Nominated	
