= Eddie Benjamin =

Australian singer (born 2002)

- Born: Eddie George Hendrix Benjamin; January 15, 2002 (age 24); Sydney, Australia
- Genres: Pop; pop rock; R&B; soul; electropop; alt-pop; alternative
- Occupations: Singer-songwriter, producer
- Instruments: Vocals; piano; guitar; bass guitar
- Years active: 2015-present
- Labels: Epic; Vol. 1
- Website: www.eddiebenjaminmusic.com

Eddie Benjamin is an Australian singer-songwriter and music producer based in Los Angeles, California. He has written and produced for artists such as Meghan Trainor, Earth Wind & Fire, and Shawn Mendes while also touring with Justin Bieber in 2022. He released his debut EP Emotional in 2021.

== Biography ==
Benjamin was born and raised in Australia. While attending Rose Bay Secondary College in Sydney, he met Tash Wolf and Indy Linzbichler with whom he would form the group Haze Trio. The group toured Australia and won competitions, including the statewide talent search for YouthRock 2016.

In 2019, Benjamin moved to Los Angeles, California, where he wrote and produced for artists such as Meghan Trainor and Earth, Wind & Fire. He also worked with Justin Bieber, whom he met through a mutual friend, later appearing in the artist's 2021 documentary.

In 2020 he released his debut single "Fuck My Friends", which he co-produced with Dan Gleyzer. He followed this with his debut EP Emotional in 2021 and toured with Justin Bieber on the 2022 Justice World Tour. He also co-wrote and produced the 2021 Shawn Mendes single "It'll Be Okay", which peaked at No. 2 on the Billboard Bubbling Under Hot 100. In June 2022, Maura Johnston, writing in Time, listed Benjamin's song "Weatherman" as one of "The Best Songs of 2022 So Far". The song was later included on his second EP of the same name, released in June 2023.

On August 1, Benjamin released the official music video for Driving.

On October 9, Benjamin released the music video for Home.

== Personal life ==
Benjamin is the son of musician Huey Benjamin and choreographer Narelle Benjamin. He has a sister, Marlo, who is a dancer. From 2019 to early 2023, he dated actress and dancer Maddie Ziegler.

== Discography ==
=== Extended plays ===
Title	EP details
Emotional	Released: 2 April 2021; Label: Epic, Vol 1; Format: Streaming, digital download
Weatherman	Released: 9 June 2023; Label: Epic, Vol 1; Format: Streaming, digital download

=== Singles ===
Year	Song	Album
2020	"Fuck My Friends"	Non-album single
2020	"Diamond Eyes" (featuring Sia)	Emotional EP
2021	"Running Away From Home"	Non-album single
2021	"Speechless"	Emotional EP
2022	"Weatherman"	Weatherman EP
2022	"Only You" (with Alessia Cara)	Weatherman EP
2023	"All for Nothing"	Weatherman EP
2023	"Stargirl"	Weatherman EP
2025	"Maniac"	TBA
2025	"Run!"	TBA
2025	"Driving"	TBA
2025	"Home" (with Shawn Mendes)	TBA
2025	"Kiss Me"	TBA

=== Writing and production discography ===
Year	Title	Artist	Writer	Producer	Notes
2020	"Silent Night"	Meghan Trainor	No	Yes	Also contributed background vocals.
2020	"Holidays" (featuring Earth, Wind & Fire)	Meghan Trainor	Yes	Yes	Also contributed guitar and background vocals.
2020	"Funk"	Meghan Trainor	Yes	Yes	
2020	"Here To Stay"	Meghan Trainor	Yes	No	
2021	"It'll Be Okay"	Shawn Mendes	Yes	Yes	Also contributed bass. Peaked at number two on the Bubbling Under Hot 100.
2022	From a Birds Eye View	Cordae	Yes	Yes	Peaked at number 13 on the US Billboard 200 and charted in multiple other countries like UK, Canada and Australia.
2022	"Five Star Hotels"	Raye	Yes	No	
2023	"What the Hell Are We Dying For?"	Shawn Mendes	Yes	No	Also contributed bass and guitar.
2025	"All I Can Take"	Justin Bieber	Yes	Yes	
2025	"Swag"	Justin Bieber	No	No	(co-credited with Bieber and Cash Cobain)
2025	""Too Long"	Justin Bieber	Yes	Yes	
