= Birds in the Trap Sing McKnight =

Studio album by Travis Scott
- Released: September 2, 2016
- Studios: Record Plant (Los Angeles); Windmark (Santa Monica)
- Genres: Hip-hop; trap
- Length: 53:38
- Labels: Grand Hustle; Epic
- Producers: Boi-1da; Cardo; Cashmere Cat; Daxz; DF; Frank Dukes; Hit-Boy; Honorable C.N.O.T.E.; Illa Jones; Mike Dean; Murda Beatz; Nav; Ricci Riera; Sy Ari Da Kid; T-Minus; TEAUXNY; TM88; Vinylz; WondaGurl

Travis Scott chronology
Rodeo (2015)	Birds in the Trap Sing McKnight (2016)	Huncho Jack, Jack Huncho (2017)

Singles from Birds in the Trap Sing McKnight
- 1. "Wonderful" Released: February 16, 2016; 2. "Pick Up the Phone" Released: June 3, 2016; 3. "Goosebumps" Released: December 13, 2016

Birds in the Trap Sing McKnight is the second studio album by American rapper Travis Scott. It was released on September 2, 2016, through Grand Hustle Records and distributed by Epic Records. Originally promoted by the fake mixtape Days Before Birds, it exclusively premiered through Travis Scott and Chase B's radio show Wav Radio on Beats 1 and Apple Music. The album features guest appearances from André 3000, Blac Youngsta, Kid Cudi, Nav, 21 Savage, Kendrick Lamar, Bryson Tiller, Young Thug, Quavo, K. Forest, and the Weeknd. Production was handled by a number of record producers, including Nav, Vinylz, Mike Dean, Cardo, Frank Dukes, Allen Ritter, and Murda Beatz, among others.

Birds in the Trap Sing McKnight was supported by three singles: "Wonderful", "Pick Up the Phone", and "Goosebumps". The album received generally favorable reviews from critics, debuting at number one on the US Billboard 200, earning 88,000 album units in the first week.

== Background ==
On January 4, 2016, Scott announced on his Snapchat account that he would be revealing the title for his new album at the time. While going on the road, Scott had been tweeting on what the title is to the album on Twitter. He first removed all of his tweets, and announced the title to the album on the Anti World Tour. In an interview with Billboard, Scott explained the meaning of his album title: "My next album, Birds in the Trap Sing McKnight is basically about all my friends and growing up here (in Houston, Texas). I'm not saying that it's a trap, we not in the fucking projects, but it's like a social trap. It's a social connection trap from what you want to do and how you want to express yourself. I feel like everyone just gets constricted by their parents or just life."

On March 30, 2016, Scott and Young Thug announced that they will be releasing their song in "the next few days". In April 2016, while Scott was performing in Houston, Texas, he previewed a snippet of the track. At the Paris Nightclub in Chicago, Illinois, Scott played the full version of the song, called "Pick Up the Phone". The duet track between Scott and Young Thug, featuring Quavo. On May 18, 2016, Scott performed a surprise show in Atlanta and confirmed the imminent release for the album, stating "I'm dropping my new album in a couple of fucking days". He went on to reveal that the album will feature "some of my favorite fucking artists".

On June 2, 2016, Scott took that song down, after posting it on his official SoundCloud page, stating that "This song was supposed to go to iTunes, but labels are making this more complicated than it actually need to be this was gonna be my single, but now I'm giving a way for the kids. P.S. They might take this down cause they don't want kids to eat".

On July 26, 2016, in a show in the Ford Amphitheater at Coney Island, Scott announced the release date for Birds in the Trap Sing McKnight, however, the album missed its release dates due to "technical difficulties" twice. After a free event named the Wav Party in Los Angeles, his music video for "90210" was showcased, while his music video for "Pick Up the Phone" has been released on Travis Scott's Vevo account on YouTube. Scott also revealed that Kid Cudi and Kendrick Lamar would appear on his album, with the production that would be provided by Cashmere Cat. On August 25, 2016, Mike Dean announced that the album was delayed again, due to the incompletion with the album's mixing. On August 31, 2016, Scott announced that he finally finished his album on his Instagram.

== Recording and production ==
On July 18, 2016, in an interview with DJ Whoo Kid, Scott revealed that his biggest musical influence is Kid Cudi. It was announced that Cudi would be appearing on the album. This was revealed a month after Cudi announced that Scott would appear on his respective solo album, Passion, Pain & Demon Slayin'.

== Release and promotion ==
On August 12, 2016, Scott premiered a song, "The Hooch" on the debut episode of his new Apple Music radio show Wav Radio with Chase B. The song was produced by Vinylz, Allen Ritter, Boi-1da and Mike Dean. Scott announced that the album would be released on August 26. On August 19, Scott premiered the new song, "Black Mass" on Wav Radio with Chase B. The song was produced by Murda Beatz and Cubeatz. The album was originally released through a fake mixtape named Days Before Birds, which leaked online on streaming platforms without promotion or any warning.

On September 2, 2016, Scott premiered the album with Chase B on Wav Radio. Scott then released the new song, "RaRa". The song features a guest appearance from American rapper Lil Uzi Vert, with the production was handled by TM88 and Cubeatz.

== Singles ==
"Wonderful" featuring Canadian singer-songwriter the Weeknd, was serviced to rhythmic radio on February 16, 2016, as the album's lead single. The song was produced by T-Minus and Boi-1da, with co-production by Mike Dean, while the additional production by Scott himself. Its initial premiere occurred through Scott's SoundCloud account on December 31, 2015. The song peaked at number 23 on the Billboard Twitter Top Tracks chart and was certified platinum by Music Canada.

"Pick Up the Phone" with Young Thug, was released as the album's second single for retail sale and streaming on June 3, 2016. It features a guest appearance from American rapper Quavo and additional vocals from American singer Starrah, while the production was provided by Vinylz and Frank Dukes, with co-production by Allen Ritter and Dean. The music video for the single premiered on August 12, 2016. "Pick Up the Phone" peaked at number 43 on the US Billboard Hot 100. It is also included on Young Thug's mixtape Jeffery.

"Goosebumps" featuring Kendrick Lamar, was released as the album's third single on December 13, 2016. It was produced by Cardo, Yung Exclusive, Cubeatz and Mike Dean. The music video premiered on April 3, 2017, exclusively on Apple Music. The song peaked at number 32 on the Billboard Hot 100.

== Critical reception ==
Professional ratings
Aggregate scores
Source	Rating
Metacritic	64/100
Review scores
Source	Rating
AllMusic	3/5 stars
Clash	7/10
Exclaim!	6/10
HipHopDX	3.9/5
HotNewHipHop	67%
Pitchfork	7.2/10
PopMatters	5/10
Tiny Mix Tapes	1.5/5
Vice (Expert Witness)	B+
XXL	4/5

Birds in the Trap Sing McKnight was met with generally favorable reviews. At Metacritic, which assigns a normalized rating out of 100 to reviews from professional publications, the album received an average score of 64, based on eight reviews.

Matthew Cooper of Clash said, "While Scott might spend the 14 tracks telling us how incoherent he is, Birds in the Trap Sing McKnight is anything but". Scott Glaysher of HipHopDX said, "There isn't a ton of lyrical progression for La Flame on this album. ... But he uses a soothing digitized finish and weaves through the most polished contemporary drums in Hip Hop, it's truly hard to hate. That puzzling beauty is the best part about Scott's music". Matthew Strauss of Pitchfork said, "Birds in the Trap Sing McKnight escapes as Travis Scott's best work yet: a combination of elevated significance, self-awareness, and the old trick of spinning something so plain into something so luxurious". Preezy of XXL said, "Birds in the Trap Sing McKnight is a roller coaster ride of an experience, with an endless amount of highlights, whether it be an indelible hook here or timely guest verse there".

Andy Kellman of AllMusic said, "Swarming basslines and sluggish beats likewise form the rhythmic foundation, with gauzy and tickling keyboards adding sweetness to Scott's hedonistic hooks. Only on "Guidance", through scuttling drums granted by DF, is there a significant shake-up". Calum Slingerland of Exclaim! said, "Scott's hedonistic lyrics about sex and drugs remain awfully vapid for what's been billed as a trap masterpiece (the utterly banal "SDP Interlude" takes the cake). ... Scott's strength, of course, continues to lie in his ear for beats, with part of his appeal being his ability to make songs with less than rewarding subject matter still sound cool". Grant Rindner of PopMatters said, "The results here are highly mixed, and he might simply be the kind of artist who should take more time on his releases, even if that extra time isn't completely his choice". Mike Giegerich of Tiny Mix Tapes said, "Birds's stripped-down approach bares an utter lack of finesse behind a microphone".

=== Rankings ===
Complex placed Birds in the Trap Sing McKnight at number five on their "50 Best Albums of 2016" year-end list, while Variance placed it at number 38. XXL ranked it among the best 50 hip-hop projects of 2016.

== Commercial performance ==
Birds in the Trap Sing McKnight debuted at number one on the US Billboard 200, earning 88,000 album-equivalent units, of which 53,000 were pure album sales. It became Scott's first number-one album. On April 29, 2025, the album was certified four-times platinum by the Recording Industry Association of America (RIAA) for combined sales and album-equivalent units of over four million units in the United States.

== Track listing ==
Birds in the Trap Sing McKnight track listing
No.	Title	Writer(s)	Producer(s)	Length
1.	"The Ends" (featuring André 3000)	Jacques Webster II; André Benjamin; Anderson Hernandez; Jahmar Carter; Ebony Oshunrinde; Ozan Yildirim; Magnus Høiberg; Benjamin Levin; Kacy Hill; Josh Leary	Vinylz; Daxz; WondaGurl^{[c]}; Oz^{[c]}	3:21
2.	"Way Back"	Webster; Scott Mescudi; Kasseem Dean; Chauncey Hollis, Jr.; Carlton Mays, Jr.; Magnus Høiberg; Michael Dean; Rogét Chahayed; Brittany Hazzard; Larry Jacks, Jr.	Hit-Boy; Honorable C.N.O.T.E.; Cashmere Cat; Mike Dean^{[a]}; Chahayed^{[a]}	4:32
3.	"Coordinate" (featuring Blac Youngsta)	Webster; Sammie Benson; Bryan Simmons	TM88	3:46
4.	"Through the Late Night" (featuring Kid Cudi)	Webster; Mescudi; Ronald LaTour, Jr.; Tim Gomringer; Kevin Gomringer; Oladipo Omishore; Brock Korsan	Cardo; Cubeatz^{[c]}	4:46
5.	"Beibs in the Trap" (featuring Nav)	Webster; Navraj Goraya; Amir Esmailian	Nav	3:33
6.	"SDP Interlude"	Webster; Cassie Ventura; Caroline Polachek; Ernest Greene; Ricci Riera	Riera	3:11
7.	"Sweet Sweet"	Webster; Shane Lindstrom; T. Gomringer; K. Gomringer; M. Dean	Murda Beatz; Cubeatz^{[c]}; M. Dean^{[c]}	3:42
8.	"Outside" (featuring 21 Savage)	Webster; Shéyaa Abraham-Joseph; Lindstrom; T. Gomringer; K. Gomringer; M. Dean; Jacks	Murda Beatz; Cubeatz^{[c]}; Oz^{[a]}; M. Dean^{[a]}	2:56
9.	"Goosebumps" (featuring Kendrick Lamar)	Webster; Kendrick Duckworth; LaTour; T. Gomringer; K. Gomringer; Daveon Jackson; Korsan	Cardo; Cubeatz; Yung Exclusive	4:03
10.	"First Take" (featuring Bryson Tiller)	Webster; Bryson Tiller; Sy Brockington; Billy Garcia; Travis Peterson; Melvin Hough II; Rivelino Wouter; Mandell Strawter; Joseph Gardner	Sy Ari Da Kid; Illa Jones; Teauxny; Mel & Mus^{[c]}	5:13
11.	"Pick Up the Phone" (with Young Thug featuring Quavo)	Webster; Jeffery Williams; Quavious Marshall; Adam Feeney; Hernandez; M. Dean; Allen Ritter; Hazzard	Frank Dukes; Vinylz; M. Dean^{[c]}; Ritter^{[a]}	4:12
12.	"Lose"	Webster; Ventura; Hernandez; Feeney; Ritter	Vinylz; Frank Dukes; Ritter^{[a]}	3:20
13.	"Guidance" (featuring K. Forest)	Webster; Kashief Hanson; Darren Fraser	DF	3:27
14.	"Wonderful" (featuring the Weeknd)	Webster; Abel Tesfaye; Matthew Samuels; Tyler Williams; M. Dean	Travis Scott; Boi-1da; T-Minus; M. Dean	3:36
Total length:				53:38

Notes

- ^{^[c]} signifies a co-producer
- ^{^[a]} signifies an additional producer
- All tracks are stylized in lowercase. For example, "Goosebumps" is stylized as "goosebumps".
- Featured artists are uncredited on digital marketplaces on all songs except for "Pick Up the Phone".
- "Pick Up the Phone" features uncredited vocals by Starrah

Sample credits

- "Through the Late Night" contains an interpolation of "Day 'n' Nite", written by Scott Mescudi and Oladipo Omishore, and performed by Kid Cudi.
- "Sweet Sweet" contains a sample of "La Cale" performed by Bertrand Eluerd.
- "SDP Interlude" contains a sample of "You and I", written by Caroline Polachek and Ernest Greene, and performed by Washed Out.
- "First Take" contains a sample of "Queen", written by Sy Brockington, Melvin Hough II and Rivelino Wouter, and performed by Sy Ari Da Kid.
- "Wonderful" contains a sample of "In the Meantime" performed by Tinashe and "We'll Be Fine" performed by Drake.

== Personnel ==
Credits adapted from the album's liner notes.

Music

- Travis Scott – lead artist
- Young Thug – lead artist (track 11)
- 21 Savage – featured artist (track 8)
- André 3000 – featured artist (track 1)
- Blac Youngsta – featured artist (track 3)
- Cassie – additional vocals (tracks 6, 12)
- Mike Dean – keyboards (tracks 7, 11, 12, 14), drum programming (track 14), vocoder (tracks 7, 14), guitars (track 2), piano (track 8)
- K. Forest – featured artist (track 13)
- Kid Cudi – featured artist (track 4), additional vocals (track 2)
- Kendrick Lamar – featured artist (track 9)
- Nav – featured artist (track 5)
- Quavo – featured artist (track 11)
- Swizz Beatz – additional vocals (track 2)
- Bryson Tiller – featured artist (track 10)
- Starrah – additional vocals (track 11)
- The Weeknd – featured artist (track 14)

Production

- André 3000 – additional vocal editing (track 1)
- James Blake – additional vocal editing (track 1)
- Boi-1da – production (track 14)
- Tristan Bott – recording assistance (tracks 5, 6, 9)
- Honorable C.N.O.T.E. – production (track 2)
- Cardo – production (tracks 3, 9)
- Cashmere Cat – production (track 2)
- Rogét Chahayed – additional production (track 2)
- Todd Cooper – additional engineering and arrangement (track 2)
- Philip "Dockz" Cromwell – recording assistance (tracks 8, 10)
- Cubeatz – co-production (tracks 3, 4, 7)
- Daxz – production (track 1)
- Mike Dean – production (tracks 12, 14), co-production (tracks 7, 11), additional production (tracks 2, 8, 9), mixing (tracks 1–12, 14), mastering
- dF – production (track 13)
- Frank Dukes – production (tracks 11, 12)
- Jason Goldberg – recording assistance (track 9)
- Blake Harden – recording (tracks 5, 6, 9, 12, 14), mixing (tracks 6, 13)
- Hit-Boy – production (track 2)
- Illa Jones – production (track 10)
- Kez Khou – mix assistance (tracks 3, 7–9, 14)
- Sean Klein – recording assistance (tracks 1, 13)
- Jason Lader – additional vocal editing (track 1)
- Jordan Lewis – recording (tracks 1–3, 9)
- Mel & Mus – co-production (track 10)
- Raphael Mesquita – recording assistance (track 5)
- Zeke Mishanec – recording (tracks 3, 4, 11, 13)
- Murda Beatz – production (tracks 7, 8)
- Nav – production (track 5), recording (track 5), mixing (track 5)
- Nisi – co-production (track 8)
- Ebony "WondaGurl" Oshunrinde – co-production (track 1)
- Oz – co-production (tracks 1, 8)
- Firas Quick – recording (tracks 8, 10)
- Dexter Randall – recording assistance (tracks 6, 12, 14)
- Ricci Riera – production (track 6)
- Brendan Silas Parry – recording assistance (tracks 3, 4)
- Allen Ritter – additional production (tracks 11, 12)
- Sy Ari Da Kid – production (track 10)
- T-Minus – production (track 14)
- TEAUXNY – production (track 10)
- TM88 – production (track 3)
- Travis Scott – co-production (track 14)
- Vinylz – production (tracks 1, 11, 12)

Managerial and design

- Corey Damon Black – art direction, design
- Anita Marisa Boriboon – creative direction (Epic Records)
- Mike Dean – executive production
- Jason Geter – executive production
- Nick Knight – creative direction, photography
- T.I. – executive production
- Travis Scott – executive production

== Charts ==
=== Weekly charts ===
Chart performance for Birds in the Trap Sing McKnight
Chart (2016–2020)	Peak position
Australian Albums (ARIA)	10
Belgian Albums (Ultratop Flanders)	28
Belgian Albums (Ultratop Wallonia)	52
Canadian Albums (Billboard)	2
Danish Albums (Hitlisten)	17
Dutch Albums (Album Top 100)	29
Estonian Albums (Albumid Tipp-40)	19
Finnish Albums (Suomen virallinen lista)	37
French Albums (SNEP)	37
Italian Albums (FIMI)	17
Latvian Albums (LaIPA)	28
New Zealand Albums (RMNZ)	10
Norwegian Albums (VG-lista)	17
Scottish Albums (Official Charts)	58
Swedish Albums (Sverigetopplistan)	46
UK Albums (Official Charts)	19
US Billboard 200	1
US Top R&B/Hip-Hop Albums (Billboard)	1

2024–2025 chart performance for Birds in the Trap Sing McKnight
Chart (2024–2025)	Peak position
Hungarian Physical Albums (MAHASZ)	37
Polish Albums (ZPAV)	51

=== Year-end charts ===
2016 year-end chart performance for Birds in the Trap Sing McKnight
Chart (2016)	Position
US Billboard 200	102
US Top R&B/Hip-Hop Albums (Billboard)	36

2017 year-end chart performance for Birds in the Trap Sing McKnight
Chart (2017)	Position
Canadian Albums (Billboard)	27
Danish Albums (Hitlisten)	28
Icelandic Albums (Tónlistinn)	28
US Billboard 200	18
US Top R&B/Hip-Hop Albums (Billboard)	13

2018 year-end chart performance for Birds in the Trap Sing McKnight
Chart (2018)	Position
Danish Albums (Hitlisten)	77
Icelandic Albums (Tónlistinn)	65
US Billboard 200	73
US Top R&B/Hip-Hop Albums (Billboard)	43

2019 year-end chart performance for Birds in the Trap Sing McKnight
Chart (2019)	Position
Danish Albums (Hitlisten)	100
Icelandic Albums (Tónlistinn)	72
US Billboard 200	115

2020 year-end chart performance for Birds in the Trap Sing McKnight
Chart (2020)	Position
Danish Albums (Hitlisten)	85
Icelandic Albums (Tónlistinn)	42
US Billboard 200	109

2021 year-end chart performance for Birds in the Trap Sing McKnight
Chart (2021)	Position
Icelandic Albums (Tónlistinn)	90
US Billboard 200	128

=== Decade-end charts ===
Decade-end chart performance for Birds in the Trap Sing McKnight
Chart (2010–2019)	Position
US Billboard 200	112

== Certifications ==
Certifications for Birds in the Trap Sing McKnight
Region	Certification	Certified units/sales
Brazil (Pro-Música Brasil)	Platinum	40,000^{‡}
Canada (Music Canada)	2× Platinum	160,000^{‡}
Denmark (IFPI Danmark)	2× Platinum	40,000^{‡}
France (SNEP)	Platinum	100,000^{‡}
Germany (BVMI)	Gold	100,000^{‡}
Italy (FIMI)	Platinum	50,000^{‡}
New Zealand (RMNZ)	3× Platinum	45,000^{‡}
Poland (ZPAV)	2× Platinum	40,000^{‡}
United Kingdom (BPI)	Gold	100,000^{‡}
United States (RIAA)	4× Platinum	4,000,000^{‡}
^{‡} Sales+streaming figures based on certification alone.

== Release history ==
Release dates and formats for Birds in the Trap Sing McKnight
Region	Date	Label(s)	Format(s)	Ref.
Various	September 2, 2016	Grand Hustle; Epic	Digital download	
Various	November 4, 2016	Grand Hustle; Epic	CD	
Various	November 25, 2016	Grand Hustle; Epic	Vinyl	
