= Wonderful (Travis Scott song) =

2016 song by Travis Scott featuring the Weeknd

Single by Travis Scott featuring The Weeknd

from the album Birds in the Trap Sing McKnight
- Released: February 16, 2016
- Genre: Hip-hop; trap
- Length: 3:36
- Label: Grand Hustle; Epic
- Songwriters: Jacques Webster II; Abel Tesfaye; Matthew Samuels; Tyler Williams; Mike Dean
- Producers: Travis Scott; Boi-1da; T-Minus; Mike Dean

Travis Scott singles chronology
"Bake Sale" (2016)	"Wonderful" (2016)	"Pick Up the Phone" (2016)

The Weeknd singles chronology
"Might Not" (2015)	"Wonderful" / "Nocturnal" (2016)	"Low Life" (2016)

"Wonderful" is a song by American rapper Travis Scott featuring Canadian singer-songwriter The Weeknd. It was released as the lead single for Scott's second studio album, Birds in the Trap Sing McKnight (2016), on February 16, 2016, when it was serviced to rhythmic contemporary radio. It marked another collaboration between Scott and the Weeknd, following their previous musical association "Pray 4 Love" on Scott's debut album Rodeo (2015). The song was produced by Boi-1da, T-Minus, and Mike Dean, with additional production from Scott.

== Background and release ==
The song was initially premiered on Scott's SoundCloud account on December 31, 2015, before being subsequently serviced to rhythmic contemporary radio on February 16, 2016, as the lead single from Birds in the Trap Sing McKnight.

On September 2, 2016, "Wonderful" was included as the fourteenth and final track on Birds in the Trap Sing McKnight, released through Grand Hustle Records and Epic Records.

== Composition and production ==
"Wonderful" is a hip-hop and trap song featuring atmospheric synthesizers, prominent percussion and a repetitive rhythmic structure. Its production was handled by Boi-1da and T-Minus, with co-production from Mike Dean and additional production by Scott. Dean also contributed keyboards and programming, in addition to mixing and mastering the track.

The song features vocals from both Scott and The Weeknd. Scott performs the primary verses, while The Weeknd contributes guest vocals. Music critic Zoe Camp of Pitchfork described the production as a "chilly club track", highlighting its clattering drums and atmospheric sound.

Lyrically, "Wonderful" explores themes of hedonism, nightlife, sexual indulgence and the lavish lifestyle associated with fame and success. The song revolves around partying, casual relationships and the pursuit of pleasure, with references to wealth, marijuana use and sexual encounters. Both artists emphasize living in the moment and enjoying the excesses of their lifestyles.

"Wonderful" is set in the key of C-sharp major (D-flat major) and has a tempo of 146 beats per minute (BPM).

== Commercial performance ==
"Wonderful" reached number 23 on the Billboard Twitter Top Tracks chart. The song was certified platinum twice by the Recording Industry Association of America (RIAA) and platinum once Music Canada.

== Personnel ==
Credits adapted from Tidal.

- Travis Scott – lead vocals, songwriting, additional production
- The Weeknd – guest vocals, songwriting
- Boi-1da – production, songwriting
- T-Minus – production, songwriting
- Mike Dean – co-production, songwriting, keyboards, programming, mixing, mastering
- Matthew Samuels – songwriting
- Tyler Williams – songwriting
