= Sweet Sweet =

Sweet Sweet may refer to:

- "Sweet Sweet", a song by the Smashing Pumpkins from Siamese Dream
- "Sweet Sweet", a song by Travis Scott from Birds in the Trap Sing McKnight
