= Jim-E Stack =

American songwriter (born 1992)

- Born: James Harmon Stack; January 21, 1992 (age 34); San Francisco, California, U.S.
- Genres: Indie pop; electronic; hip hop
- Occupations: Record producer; songwriter; musician; DJ
- Years active: 2012–present

James Harmon Stack (born January 21, 1992), known professionally as Jim-E Stack, is an American songwriter, record producer, and DJ born in San Francisco, CA, and based in Los Angeles, CA. His solo releases have featured Bon Iver, Empress Of, Charli XCX, Lucky Daye, Ant Clemons, Jana Hunter of Lower Dens, and the Range. As a songwriter and record producer, Stack has collaborated with Dominic Fike, Kacy Hill, Octavian, Bon Iver, Joji, Caroline Polachek, Haim, Diplo, Empress Of, Lorde, and more. He has remixed Wet, Anna of the North, Rostam, Active Child, and Lower Dens, as well as other artists.

== Career ==
=== 2011-2016: Early years, Tell Me I Belong ===
Born James Harmon Stack, Jim-E Stack grew up in San Francisco's Inner Richmond, where his passion for music evolved from playing in garage rock bands and jazz bands to making beats inspired by Daft Punk, Burial, J Dilla, Timbaland, and The Neptunes. While Stack lived in New Orleans and Brooklyn, his original releases and EPs, in addition to remixes for Sky Ferreira and ASAP Rocky, garnered critical acclaim and interest. It would lead to his debut 2014 album, Tell Me I Belong, accompanied by touring with Shlohmo and Bonobo.

=== 2016–present: Collaborations, Ephemera ===
Returning to California in 2016, Stack continued to release new solo material, including collaborations with fellow electronic artist The Range, as well as solo releases featuring Noonie Bao, Rostam, Charli XCX, and more. Between then and early 2019, he collaborated with Empress Of, Diplo, and Caroline Polachek for their own music, in addition to contributing on songs for Haim.

Stack contributed heavily to his then-partner Kacy Hill's second studio album Is It Selfish If We Talk About Me Again, released July 2020. Hill states Stack acted as inspiration for much of the album's lyrical content in the liner notes of the record.

From late 2019 through 2020, Stack released new singles featuring Ant Clemons, Empress Of, Dijon Duenas and Bon Iver, along with an announcement for a new album titled Ephemera. It features the aforementioned singles, with other collaborations with Octavian, Bearface of Brockhampton and Kacy Hill. Stack also released a CD exclusive EP in October 2021, which was available for free only at one store in New York and London.

Stack was again a primary collaborator in the creation of Kacy Hill's Simple, Sweet, and Smiling album, which released in October 2021. In 2023, Stack served as a principal producer, songwriter, and instrumentalist with Dominic Fike, collaborating on his album Sunburn.

Stack worked again with Bon Iver as a primary collaborator on their SABLE EP, which was released in October 2024, and the subsequent album SABLE, fABLE, which was released in April 2025. Stack was a principal collaborator, producer, and composer on Lorde's fourth studio album, Virgin, released June 2025, with Stack being credited on the album's entire track list.

== Discography ==
=== Studio albums ===
Title	Details
Tell Me I Belong	Released: July 29, 2014; Label: Innovative Leisure; Formats: LP, CD, digital download, streaming
Ephemera	Released: October 30, 2020; Label: Self-released; Formats: LP, digital download, streaming

=== EPs ===
Title	Details
Come Between	Released: January 16, 2012; Label: Good Years Recordings; Formats: Digital download, streaming
It's Jim-ee	Released: August 4, 2017; Label: Self-released; Formats: LP, digital download, streaming
Promotional Only	Released: October 12, 2021; Label: Self-released; Formats: CD, digital download, streaming

=== Singles ===
Title	Year	Label	Album
"Bubble Boy"	2012	Body High	Non-album single
"Deadstream"	2016	Self-released	It's Jim-ee
"Hyperballad" (featuring Jana Hunter)	2016	Self-released	Non-album single
"You are Not Alone"	2016	Self-released	Non-album single
"Forgotten"	2016	Self-released	Non-album single
"Dreamt"	2016	Self-released	It's Jim-ee
"Deadstream" (Rostam Version featuring Charli XCX)	2016	Self-released	It's Jim-ee
"Forgiven"	2017	Self-released	It's Jim-ee
"Moments Noticed"	2017	Self-released	It's Jim-ee
"With You" (with The Range)	2017	Domino	Non-album single
''Somebody" (featuring Noonie Bao)	2018	Self-released	Non-album single
"A Man Can't Know What It's Like To Be A Mother"	2019	Self-released	Non-album single
"Good Enough" (featuring Ant Clemons)	2019	Self-released	Ephemera
"Note To Self" (featuring Empress Of)	2020	Self-released	Ephemera
"Sweet Summer Sweat" (featuring Dijon)	2020	Self-released	Ephemera
"Jeanie" (featuring Bon Iver)	2020	Self-released	Ephemera
"Can We" (featuring Kacy Hill)	2020	Self-released	Ephemera
"Sweet & Spice" (Deb Never & Jim-E Stack)	2021	Self-released	Where Have All the Flowers Gone?
"2nd Round"	2021	Self-released	Promotional Only
"FFBH"	2021	Self-released	Promotional Only
"Next to Me" (featuring Lucky Daye)	2022	Self-released	Non-album single

=== Remixes ===
Title	Year	Artist(s)
"Lovers" (Jim-E Stack Remix)	2017	Anna of the North
"Real Thing" (Jim-E Stack Remix)	2017	Lower Dens
"Warning Intruders" (Jim-E Stack Remix)	2018	Rostam
"When I'm With Him" (Perfume Genius Cover)	2019	Empress Of
"Old Bone" (Jim-E Stack Remix)	2019	Wet
"Cruel World" (Jim-E Stack Remix)	2020	Active Child
"Without You" (Jim-E Stack Remix)	2020	Perfume Genius

== Songwriting and production discography ==
List of songs co-written, featuring production involvement, instrumentation and/or engineering for other artists, showing year released and album name
Title	Year	Lead artist	Album	Credit(s)			
Title	Year	Lead artist	Album	Writing	Production	Instrumentation	Engineering
"Want You Back"	2017	HAIM	Something to Tell You			Keyboards	
"New Moon"	2017	Cold Specks	Fool's Paradise	Yes			
"What the Hell"	2017	Bridge	Wreck	Yes	Yes		
"Be A Man (Get In the Cold Shower)"	2018	Kidepo	Non-album single		Yes		
"Flacko"	2018	Cosha	R.I.P Bonzai	Yes	Co	Programming, synths	Yes
"Shoulda"	2018	RL Grime	NOVA		Yes		
"When I'm with Him"	2018	Empress Of	Us	Yes	Co		
"Esta Noche"	2018	Dillon Francis	WUT WUT	Yes	Co		
"No Pare"	2018	Dillon Francis	WUT WUT	Yes	Co		
"New Shapes" (featuring Octavian)	2019	Diplo	Europa	Yes	Co		
"Galapagos"	2019	Lower Dens	The Competition		Additional		
"I Give Up"	2019	Caroline Polachek	Pang	Yes	Co		
"Door"	2019	Caroline Polachek	Pang	Yes	Co		
"U Give It Up"	2020	Empress Of	I'm Your Empress Of		Co		
"PDLIF"	2020	Bon Iver	Non-album single	Yes	Co	Drum programming	
"enemy"	2020	Charli XCX	how i'm feeling now			Keyboards	
"FUBT"	2020	HAIM	Women in Music Pt. III			Drum programming	
"To Someone Else"	2020	Kacy Hill	Is It Selfish If We Talk About Me Again	Yes	Co		
"Much Higher"	2020	Kacy Hill	Is It Selfish If We Talk About Me Again	Yes	Co		
"Just to Say"	2020	Kacy Hill	Is It Selfish If We Talk About Me Again		Co		
"Porsche"	2020	Kacy Hill	Is It Selfish If We Talk About Me Again		Co		
"Unkind"	2020	Kacy Hill	Is It Selfish If We Talk About Me Again	Yes	Co		
"Six"	2020	Kacy Hill	Is It Selfish If We Talk About Me Again		Co		
"Dinner"	2020	Kacy Hill	Is It Selfish If We Talk About Me Again	Yes	Yes		
"Friend"	2020	Gracie Abrams	minor	Yes	Co	Drum programming	
"tehe"	2020	Gracie Abrams	minor	Yes	Co	Drum programming, bass programming	
"Chapter 1"	2020	Octavian	ALPHA	Yes	Yes		
"Rari" (featuring Future)	2020	Octavian	ALPHA	Yes	Yes		
"Double Negative (Skeleton Milkshake)"	2020	Dominic Fike	What Could Possibly Go Wrong	Yes	Co		
"AUATC"	2020	Bon Iver	Non-album single	Yes	Co	Drums, percussion	
"Your Man"	2020	Joji	Nectar	Yes	Yes		
"Lazy"	2020	Lupin	Lupin			Drum programming	
"Bored Again!" (featuring Gabriel Delicious)	2020	Buddy Ross	Non-album single	Yes			
"Starface*"	2020	Jean Dawson	Pixel Bath	Yes	Co		
"Roots"	2021	Cautious Clay	Deadpan Love	Yes	Co		
"Escalator"	2021	Ritt Momney	Non-album single	Yes	Yes	Bass, keyboards, programming	
"Sweet & Spice"	2021	Deb Never & Jim-E Stack	Where Have All the Flowers Gone?	Yes	Co	Programming	
"I Couldn't Wait"	2021	Kacy Hill	Simple, Sweet, and Smiling	Yes	Co		
"Seasons Bloom"	2021	Kacy Hill	Simple, Sweet, and Smiling	Yes	Co		
"The Right Time"	2021	Kacy Hill	Simple, Sweet, and Smiling		Co		
"Simple, Sweet, and Smiling"	2021	Kacy Hill	Simple, Sweet, and Smiling		Co		
"Walking at Midnight"	2021	Kacy Hill	Simple, Sweet, and Smiling		Co		
"So Loud"	2021	Kacy Hill	Simple, Sweet, and Smiling		Co		
"Caterpillars"	2021	Kacy Hill	Simple, Sweet, and Smiling		Co		
"Mochi's Interlude"	2021	Kacy Hill	Simple, Sweet, and Smiling		Co		
"Easy Going"	2021	Kacy Hill	Simple, Sweet, and Smiling	Yes	Co		
"The Stars"	2021	Kacy Hill	Simple, Sweet, and Smiling	Yes	Co		
"Another You"	2021	Kacy Hill	Simple, Sweet, and Smiling		Co		
"Milk Me"	2022	Sudan Archives	Natural Brown Prom Queen	Yes	Co		
"Welcome To My Island"	2023	Caroline Polachek	Desire, I Want to Turn Into You	Yes	Co		
"Chalk 1.3.3 [2017 Export Wav]"	2023	Flume	Arrived Anxious, Left Bored	Yes	Co		
"Revolve Around You"	2023	Lola Young	My Mind Wanders and Sometimes Leaves Completely	Yes	Co	Drum programming, synthesizer	
"How Much Is Weed?"	2023	Dominic Fike	Sunburn	Yes	Co	Drums, keyboards	Yes
"Ant Pile"	2023	Dominic Fike	Sunburn	Yes	Co	Drums, keyboards	
"Sick"	2023	Dominic Fike	Sunburn	Yes	Co	Keyboards, bass guitar	
"7 Hours"	2023	Dominic Fike	Sunburn	Yes	Co	Drums	
"Bodies"	2023	Dominic Fike	Sunburn	Yes	Co	Drums	Yes
"Sunburn"	2023	Dominic Fike	Sunburn	Yes	Co	Drums, keyboards, guitar	Yes
"Pasture Child"	2023	Dominic Fike	Sunburn	Yes	Co	Drums	
"4x4"	2023	Dominic Fike	Sunburn	Yes	Co	Keyboards	Yes
"Frisky"	2023	Dominic Fike	Sunburn	Yes	Co	Keyboards	
"Mama's Boy"	2023	Dominic Fike	Sunburn	Yes	Co	Keyboards	
"Dark"	2023	Dominic Fike	Sunburn	Yes	Co	Programming	
"Someday"	2023	Elmiene	Marking My Time	Yes	Co	Drums, keyboards, programming	
"You"	2023	The Kid LAROI	The First Time	Yes	Co		
"Save Your Tears"	2024	Jess Glynne	Jess	Yes	Yes		
"Dance Alone"	2024	Sia & Kylie Minogue	Reasonable Woman		Co	Bass, drum programming, keyboards, percussion, synthesizer	
"My Day Off" (featuring Nourished by Time)	2024	Kacy Hill	BUG	Yes	Co		
"Take Me to the River"	2024	Lorde	Everyone's Getting Involved: A Tribute to Talking Heads' Stop Making Sense		Co	Programming	
"Girl, So Confusing featuring Lorde"	2024	Charli XCX	Brat and It's Completely Different but Also Still Brat	Yes			
"Things Behind Things Behind Things"	2024	Bon Iver	Sable (EP)		Co		
"Speyside"	2024	Bon Iver	Sable (EP)		Co		
"Awards Season"	2024	Bon Iver	Sable (EP)		Co		
"Short Story"	2025	Bon Iver	Sable, Fable	Yes	Co		
"Everything Is Peaceful Love"	2025	Bon Iver	Sable, Fable	Yes	Co		
"Walk Home"	2025	Bon Iver	Sable, Fable	Yes	Co		
"Day One"	2025	Bon Iver	Sable, Fable		Co		
"From"	2025	Bon Iver	Sable, Fable	Yes	Co		
"I'll Be There"	2025	Bon Iver	Sable, Fable	Yes	Co		
"If Only I Could Wait"	2025	Bon Iver	Sable, Fable	Yes	Co		
"There's A Rhythmn"	2025	Bon Iver	Sable, Fable	Yes	Co		
"Au Revoir"	2025	Bon Iver	Sable, Fable		Co		
"I Think It's You"	2025	Aminé	13 Months of Sunshine	Yes	Co		
"Cool About It"	2025	Aminé	13 Months of Sunshine	Yes	Co		
"Familiar"	2025	Aminé	13 Months of Sunshine	Yes	Co		
"Doing the Best I Can"	2025	Aminé	13 Months of Sunshine	Yes	Co		
"Temptations"	2025	Aminé	13 Months of Sunshine	Yes	Co		
"Changer"	2025	Aminé	13 Months of Sunshine	Yes	Co		
"Hammer"	2025	Lorde	Virgin	Yes	Co		
"What Was That"	2025	Lorde	Virgin	Yes	Co		
"Shapeshifter"	2025	Lorde	Virgin	Yes	Co		
"Man of the Year"	2025	Lorde	Virgin	Yes	Co		
"Favourite Daughter"	2025	Lorde	Virgin	Yes	Co		
"Current Affairs"	2025	Lorde	Virgin		Co		
"Clearblue"	2025	Lorde	Virgin	Yes	Co		
"GRWM"	2025	Lorde	Virgin	Yes	Co		
"Broken Glass"	2025	Lorde	Virgin	Yes	Co		
"If She Could See Me Now"	2025	Lorde	Virgin	Yes	Co		
"David"	2025	Lorde	Virgin	Yes	Co		
True Believer	2025	Hayley Williams	Ego Death at a Bachelorette Party	Yes	Co		
Purple	2026	Olivia Rodrigo	You Seem Pretty Sad for a Girl So in Love		Co	Drum programming, guitar, piano, programming	Yes
