= Love, Death & Dancing =

Studio album by Jack Garratt
- Released: 12 June 2020
- Genre: Pop
- Length: 57:45
- Label: Island
- Producer: Jack Garratt (exec.); Jacknife Lee; James Flannigan

Jack Garratt chronology
Phase (2016)	Love, Death & Dancing (2020)

Singles from Love, Death & Dancing
- 1. "Time" Released: 6 February 2020; 2. "Better" Released: 20 April 2020; 3. "Circles" Released: 10 June 2020

Professional ratings
Aggregate scores
Source	Rating
Metacritic	77/100
Review scores
Source	Rating
AllMusic	4/5 stars
Clash	6/10
The Guardian	4/5 stars
The Line of Best Fit	8.5/10
NME	3/5 stars

Love, Death & Dancing is the second studio album by British singer-songwriter and musician Jack Garratt. It was released on 12 June 2020 through Island Records as the follow-up to his 2016 debut album Phase.

== Background ==
After finishing touring his debut album Phase towards the end of 2016, he began working and writing material with other artists, such as Kacy Hill and Katy Perry and, into 2017, Jack recorded an albums worth of new material, which he ultimately scrapped, saying that "It was trash. It was awful. It was all bad. I wasn't willing to accept myself in that moment, so I wasn't willing to have a good idea." He then took time off to deal with the anxiety and self-doubt that he was feeling as a result of the attention and scrutiny that had come with the success and awards for his previous album. He then met with record producer Jacknife Lee, and together they began working on recording new music.

== Release and promotion ==
On 6 February 2020, his new single "Time" premiered as the "Hottest Record" on Annie Mac's Future Sounds show on BBC Radio 1. The song features as the opening track on his new extended play Love, Death and Dancing (Vol. 1) which was released on the same day., containing the tracks "Mara" and "Return Them to the One". This EP makes up part of Garratt's second album Love, Death and Dancing, released on 12 June 2020.

== Track listing ==
The album's twelve tracks appear in a different order depending on the listening medium. On the physical releases (vinyl, CD and cassette), they are arranged to convey the narrative of Garratt's life between the releases of Phase and Love, Death & Dancing, whereas on streaming services, they are sorted into four volumes of three tracks each, which are designed as "curated glances of the album as a whole".

=== Physical tracklist ===
All tracks are written by Jack Garratt and Henry Brill, except where noted

Physical release
No.	Title	Writer(s)	Producer(s)	Length
1.	"Return Them to the One"	Garratt	Garratt; James Flannigan	4:25
2.	"Get in My Way"		Garratt; Flannigan	3:41
3.	"Better"		Garratt; Lee; Flannigan	4:13
4.	"Doctor Please"	Garratt	Garratt; Flannigan	4:59
5.	"Mend a Heart"		Garratt; Flannigan; Lee^{[a]}	4:21
6.	"Anyone"		Garratt; Flannigan; Lee^{[a]}; Brett Cox^{[b]}	5:23
7.	"Mara"		Garratt; Lee^{[a]}	6:02
8.	"Circles"		Garratt; Lee^{[a]}	3:46
9.	"Time"		Garratt; Jacknife Lee	5:37
10.	"She Will Lay My Body on the Stone"		Garratt	4:24
11.	"Old Enough"	Garratt; Brill; James Flannigan	Garratt; Flannigan; Cox^{[b]}	3:50
12.	"Only the Bravest"	Garratt	Lee	6:59
Total length:				57:45

=== Streaming tracklist ===
Volume 1
No.	Title	Writer(s)	Producer(s)	Length
1.	"Time"		Garratt; Jacknife Lee	5:37
2.	"Mara"		Garratt; Lee^{[a]}	6:02
3.	"Return Them to the One"	Garratt	Garratt; James Flannigan	4:25

Volume 2
No.	Title	Writer(s)	Producer(s)	Length
4.	"Better"		Garratt; Lee; Flannigan	4:13
5.	"Get in My Way"		Garratt; Flannigan	3:41
6.	"Mend a Heart"		Garratt; Flannigan; Lee^{[a]}	4:21

Volume 3
No.	Title	Writer(s)	Producer(s)	Length
7.	"Circles"		Garratt; Lee^{[a]}	3:46
8.	"Anyone"		Garratt; Flannigan; Lee^{[a]}; Brett Cox^{[b]}	5:23
9.	"Doctor Please"	Garratt	Garratt; Flannigan	4:59

Volume 4
No.	Title	Writer(s)	Producer(s)	Length
10.	"She Will Lay My Body on the Stone"		Garratt	4:24
11.	"Old Enough"	Garratt; Brill; James Flannigan	Garratt; Flannigan; Cox^{[b]}	3:50
12.	"Only the Bravest"	Garratt	Lee	6:59

Notes

- ^{^[a]} signifies a co-record producer.
- ^{^[b]} signifies an additional producer.

== Personnel ==
- Jack Garratt – production, vocals, programming, mastering, vocal arrangement, engineering
- Jacknife Lee – production, co-production, engineering, keyboards, programming
- David Wrench – mixing, programming
- Matt Bishop – engineering
- James Flannigan – production, programming, engineering
- Heba Kadry – mastering
- Brett Cox – vocal engineering

== Charts ==
Chart performance for Love, Death & Dancing
Chart (2020)	Peak position
Scottish Albums (OCC)	7
UK Albums (OCC)	8
