= Jack Garratt =

English musician (born 1991)

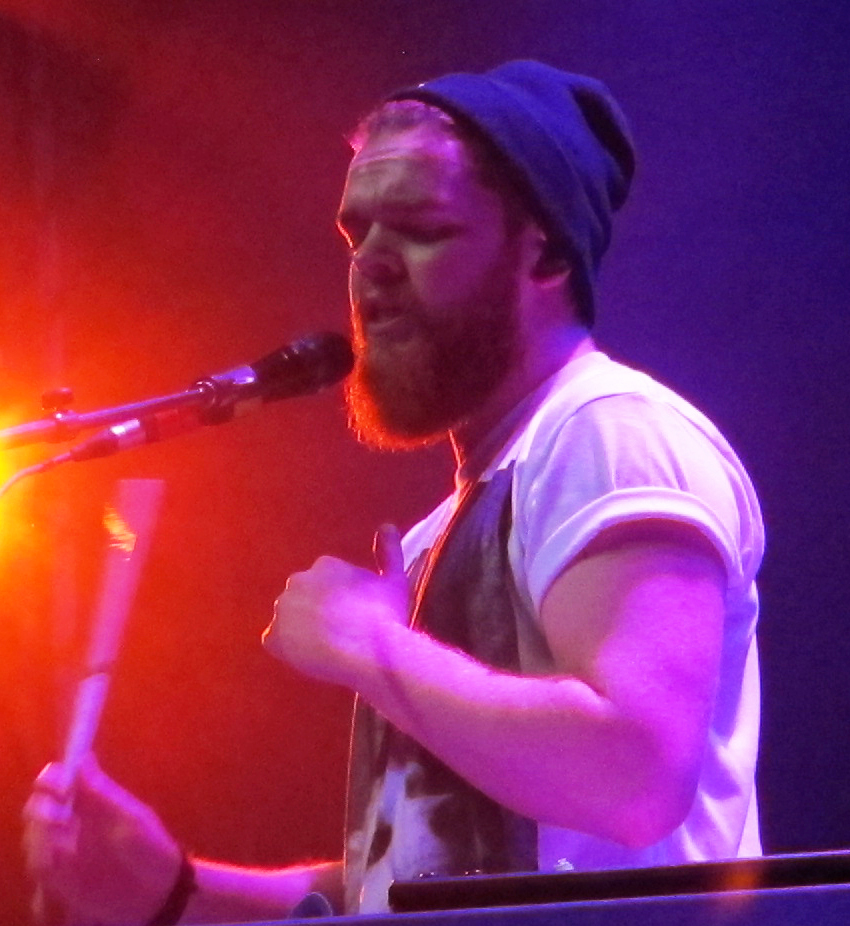
- Garratt performing in 2015

Background information
- Born: Jack Robert Garratt; 11 October 1991 (age 35); High Wycombe, Buckinghamshire, England
- Genres: Indie pop; trip hop; alternative R&B; electronica
- Occupation: Singer-songwriter
- Years active: 2005–present
- Label: Island
- Website: jackgarratt.com

Jack Robert Garratt (born 11 October 1991) is an English singer, songwriter, and composer from Little Chalfont, Buckinghamshire. He released his debut studio album Phase on 19 February 2016, charting in the top-five of the UK Albums Chart. At the 2016 Brit Awards he received the Critics' Choice Award. Garratt released his sophomore album Love, Death and Dancing in 2020, becoming his second top-ten album. His third album, Pillars, released in August 2025.

== Early life ==
Jack Robert Garratt was born 11 October 1991 in High Wycombe in Buckinghamshire. His mother was a primary school music teacher and his father was a police officer. He grew up in the village of Little Chalfont. About his childhood he has stated that: "I just really enjoyed making noises and really enjoyed the reaction that I got from making those noises. So they [parents] put me on music lessons to encourage me to hone in on that talent rather than show off." He wrote his first song when he was 12 and learned to play a variety of instruments from the guitar, drums and piano to the harmonica, mandolin, trombone and ukulele. He attended St Clement Danes School in Chorleywood and the University of Roehampton in London, which he left after his first year.

== Career ==
=== Junior Eurovision 2005 ===
In September 2005, Garratt entered the UK national selection for that year's Junior Eurovision Song Contest to be held in Belgium. On the night Jack's song "The Girl" finished 8/8 with just 13 points. He has since said "That was the first time I tried to achieve anything as a musician but my intentions were wrong. I did it more for attention rather than for a love of what I was doing."

=== 2009–2013 ===
Garratt went to university to train to be a teacher. He signed to an independent record label and began working on an album with the title Nickel and Dime. The music was acoustic blues music. He was played on BBC Three Counties Radio in March 2012 as part of BBC Introducing.

He abandoned the album when he realised that "I wasn't proud of the songs I was writing, and I was performing the music because I liked the way that people reacted rather than because I was proud of the songs." He dropped out of university and "had a real self-destructive moment" and has said that "I felt like I was going through a quarter or a midlife crisis, but I was not even 20." He decided to write music "with a totally different level of respect and integrity" and spent a year writing new songs.

=== 2014–2016: Phase ===
On 28 October 2014, Garratt released his first extended play, Remnants, and a remix EP, Remnix. On 28 November 2014 he released the single "The Love You're Given". His 2014 single "Worry" was playlisted by BBC Radio 1, and he headlined the BBC Introducing stage of the Reading and Leeds Festivals. He also headlined at the Lost Village Festival in Lincoln in 2016. On 27 September 2015 he performed at the Apple Music Festival which took place at The Roundhouse, London. Garratt supported Mumford and Sons on their 2015 UK tour, playing at 13 events at 9 arenas across the UK and Ireland. He was the winner of the Critics' Choice category at the 2016 Brit Awards, BBC Sound of 2016 poll and is on MTV's Brand New 2016 shortlist. He released his debut studio album Phase on 19 February 2016. In February 2016, he played his single "Worry" during the Italian show "Che tempo che fa".

=== 2017–2021: Hiatus and Love, Death and Dancing ===
After finishing touring Phase at the end of 2016, over the next year, Garratt recorded a new album, which he ultimately scrapped, saying that "It was trash. It was awful. It was all bad. I wasn't willing to accept myself in that moment, so I wasn't willing to have a good idea." He then took time off to deal with the anxiety and self-doubt that he was feeling as a result of the attention and scrutiny that had come with the success and awards for his previous album. He then met with record producer Jacknife Lee, and together they began working on recording new music. On 6 February 2020, his new single "Time" premiered as the "Hottest Record" on Annie Mac's Future Sounds show on BBC Radio 1. The song features as the opening track on his EP Love, Death and Dancing (Vol. 1) which was released on the same day. This EP makes up part of Garratt's second album Love, Death and Dancing, which was released on 12 June 2020.

=== 2022–present: Hands Go Up EP and Pillars ===
In 2022, Garratt released a new single - "Just How I Like It", and followed up with "No Good Without You" and "Hands Go Up" in 2023. All three singles were included on the Hands Go Up EP, released in May 2023. In March 2023, Jack performed live in Manchester, Leeds, Birmingham, Bristol, Brighton and London, and performed at a number of festivals later in the year.

In 2025, Garratt returned with the announcement of his third studio album Pillars, scheduled for release in August 2025. Three singles have thus far been released: "Catherine Wheel", "Ready! Steady! Go!" and "Higher". "Higher" is included as one of the soundtracks in the game EA Sports FC 26.

== Discography ==
=== Studio albums ===
Title	Details	Peak chart positions										Certifications
Title	Details	UK	AUS	BEL (FL)	BEL (WA)	GER	ITA	NL	NZ	SWI	US	Certifications
Phase	Released: 19 February 2016; Label: Island; Formats: CD, digital download, streaming, vinyl	3	9	18	88	28	63	21	37	7	127	BPI: Gold
Love, Death & Dancing	Released: 12 June 2020; Label: Island; Formats: CD, digital download, streaming, vinyl	8	—	—	—	—	—	—	—	—	—	
Pillars	Released: 15 August 2025; Label: Cooking Vinyl; Formats: CD, digital download, streaming, vinyl	43	—	—	—	—	—	—	—	—	—	
The Tension Between	Released: 26 June 2026; Label: Cooking Vinyl; Formats: CD, digital download, streaming, vinyl	—	—	—	—	—	—	—	—	—	—	
"—" denotes an album that did not chart or was not released in that territory.

=== EPs ===
Title	Details
Remnants	Released: 28 October 2014; Label: Island Records; Formats: Digital download
Remnix	Released: 28 October 2014; Label: Island Records; Formats: Digital download
BBC Music: Huw Stephens Session	Released: 11 April 2015; Label: Island Records; Formats: Digital download
Synesthesiac	Released: 12 April 2015; Label: Island Records; Formats: Digital download
Apple Music Festival: London 2015	Released: 14 October 2015; Label: Island Records; Formats: Digital download
Love, Death & Dancing (Vol. 1)	Released: 6 February 2020; Label: Island Records; Formats: Digital download
Love, Death & Dancing (Vol. 2)	Released: 20 April 2020; Label: Island Records; Formats: Digital download
Hands Go Up	Released: 26 May 2023; Label: Bubinga Limited; Formats: Digital download

=== Singles ===
Title	Year	Peak chart positions				Certifications	Album
Title	Year	UK	BEL (FL)	ITA	US AAA	Certifications	Album
"The Love You're Given"	2014	—	—	—	—		Phase
"Chemical"	2015	—	—	—	—		Phase
"Weathered"	2015	173	—	—	—		Phase
"Breathe Life"	2015	183	42	—	—		Phase
"Worry"	2015	67	84	64	18	BPI: Silver; FIMI: Gold	Phase
"Surprise Yourself"	2016	—	—	—	—		Phase
"Far Cry"	2016	74	—	—	—		Phase
"Time"	2020	—	—	—	—		Love, Death & Dancing
"Better"	2020	—	—	—	—		Love, Death & Dancing
"Circles"	2020	—	—	—	—		Love, Death & Dancing
"Just How I Like It"	2022	—	—	—	—		Hands Go Up
"No Good Without You"	2023	—	—	—	—		Hands Go Up
"Hands Go Up"	2023	—	—	—	—		Hands Go Up
"Catherine Wheel"	2025	—	—	—	—		Pillars
"Ready! Steady! Go!"	2025	—	—	—	—		Pillars
"Higher"	2025	—	—	—	—		Pillars
"The Whole of the Moon"	2026	—	—	—	—		Non-album single
"Thicc Feelings"	2026	—	—	—	—		The Tension Between
"Song 29"	2026	—	—	—	—		The Tension Between
"Pillars (Jack of All Trades)"	2026	—	—	—	—		The Tension Between
"—" denotes a single that did not chart or was not released in that territory.

== Songwriting and production credits ==
Title	Year	Artist(s)	Album	Credits	Written with	Produced with
"Foreign Fields"	2015	Kacy Hill	Bloo EP	Co-writer/producer	Kacy Hill	—N/a
"Power"	2017	Katy Perry	Witness	Co-writer/co-producer	Katheryn Hudson, William Robinson	Mailbox

== Awards and nominations ==
Year	Organisation	Award	Work	Result
2015	BBC	Introducing Artist of the Year	Himself	Won
2015	BRIT Awards	Critics' Choice Award	Himself	Won
2015	MTV UK	Brand New for 2016	Himself	Nominated
2015	BBC	Sound of 2016	Himself	Won
