= Simple, Sweet, and Smiling =

Studio album by Kacy Hill
- Released: October 15, 2021
- Recorded: 2020–July 2021
- Genre: Indie pop
- Length: 33:37
- Label: Self-released
- Producer: Kacy Hill; Jim-E Stack; John Carroll Kirby; Ariel Rechtshaid; Mk.gee; Ethan Gruska

Kacy Hill chronology
Just Circling Back Here: Is It Selfish If We Talk About Me Again (Remixes) (2020)	Simple, Sweet, and Smiling (2021)	Bug (2024)

Singles from Simple, Sweet, and Smiling
- 1. "Seasons Bloom" Released: August 27, 2021; 2. "Easy Going" Released: September 24, 2021

Professional ratings
Review scores
Source	Rating
Pitchfork	7.0/10
PopMatters	8/10

Simple, Sweet, and Smiling is the third studio album by American singer-songwriter Kacy Hill. It was released independently on October 15, 2021. It was preceded by the singles "Seasons Bloom", and "Easy Going". The album was made primarily in collaboration with her then-partner Jim-E Stack, and John Carroll Kirby, collaborating also with Eli Teplin, Ariel Rechtshaid, Mk.gee, and Ethan Gruska.

== Background and release ==
Hill released two singles in support of the album: "Seasons Bloom" on August 27, 2021, and "Easy Going" on September 24, 2021. She released a music video for "Easy Going" on October 27, 2021.

Hill embarked on her first headlining tour, the Simple, Sweet and Selfish Tour, in support of the album, as well as its predecessor.

Similarly to her previous 2020 record, Is It Selfish If We Talk About Me Again, the album documents Hill working through feelings of powerlessness and agoraphobic panic disorder, as well as acknowledging gratefulness towards her loved ones, and moments of clarity.

In late February 2022, Hill unveiled a demo album available for consumption via the NFT-based music platform, Catalog.

== Critical reception ==
Peter Piatkowski of PopMatters praised the album for "Hill’s sharp, forthright lyrics and the lovely soundscape she’s created with her producers work to make an incredible album of stirring pop tunes that display an artist’s emotional vulnerability – and the strength she possesses to share it." Writing for Pitchfork, Cat Zhang wrote that the album was charming despite its heavy themes.

== Track listing ==
Simple, Sweet, and Smiling track listing
No.	Title	Writer(s)	Producer(s)	Length
1.	"I Couldn't Wait"	Kacy Hill; James Harmon Stack; Eli Teplin	Jim-E Stack; Hill	2:37
2.	"Seasons Bloom"	Hill; John Carroll Kirby; Stack; Ariel Rechtshaid	Rechtshaid; Jim-E Stack; Hill	3:28
3.	"The Right Time"	Hill; Kirby	Kirby; Jim-E Stack; Hill	3:01
4.	"Simple, Sweet, and Smiling"	Hill; Kirby	Mk.gee; Kirby; Jim-E Stack; Hill	4:06
5.	"Walking at Midnight"	Hill; Kirby	Kirby; Jim-E Stack; Hill	3:23
6.	"So Loud"	Hill; Teplin	Kirby; Jim-E Stack; Hill	3:11
7.	"Caterpillars"	Hill; Kirby	Jim-E Stack; Hill	3:22
8.	"Mochi's Interlude"	Hill; Teplin	Jim-E Stack; Hill	1:27
9.	"Easy Going"	Hill; Ethan Gruska; Stack	Jim-E Stack; Gruska; Hill	2:42
10.	"The Stars"	Hill; Kirby; Stack; BJ Burton; Steve Garrington	Kirby; Jim-E Stack; Hill	2:52
11.	"Another You"	Hill; Kirby	Kirby; Jim-E Stack; Hill	3:38
Total length:				33:51
