= Bug (Kacy Hill album) =

- Physical cover, streaming cover shares the same photo as “You Know I Love You Still”

Studio album by Kacy Hill
- Released: May 3, 2024
- Length: 33:11
- Label: Mochi Headquarters, Inc.; Nettwerk
- Producer: Kacy Hill; Bartees Strange; Aidan Spiro; Aaron Wing; Henry Kwapis; James Stack; Sega Bodega; Tommy King

Kacy Hill chronology
Simple, Sweet, and Smiling (2021)	Bug (2024)	But Anyway, No Worries! (2025)

Singles from Bug
- 1. "No One" Released: November 3, 2023; 2. "Frog Rinse" Released: December 8, 2023; 3. "Listen to You" Released: January 19, 2024; 4. "You Know I Love You Still" Released: March 1, 2024; 5. "Damn" Released: April 5, 2024

Bug (stylised in all caps) is the fourth studio album by American singer-songwriter Kacy Hill. It was released on May 3, 2024, via Nettwerk, marking the first album Hill has released through a label since her debut album, Like a Woman, in 2017 via GOOD Music. The album artwork and its respective singles were shot by Chuck Grant. The album's original artwork was changed across streaming platforms, due to censorship.

It was supported by the singles "No One", "Frog Rinse", "Listen to You", "You Know I Love You Still", and "Damn".

Hill will also embark on The Bug Tour across the United States in support of the album.

== Track listing ==
Credits adapted from TIDAL.

No.	Title	Writer(s)	Producer(s)	Length
1.	"No One"	Kacy Hill; Aaron Wing	Hill; Bartees Strange; Aidan Spiro	4:17
2.	"You Know I Love You Still"	Hill; Wing; Spiro; Bartees Strange; Christian Taylor	Hill; Wing; Spiro	3:17
3.	"Damn"	Hill; Andrew Jackson; Chelsea Lena; Henry Kwapis	Kwapis	3:22
4.	"Listen to You"	Hill; Wing; Spiro; Taylor	Hill; Bartees Strange; Spiro	3:46
5.	"Frog Rinse"	Hill; John Carroll Kirby; Wing; Spiro; Taylor	Hill; Bartees Strange; Spiro	3:22
6.	"My Day Off" (featuring Nourished by Time)	Hill; James Stack; Marcus Brown; Micah Gordon	Hill; Stack	3:02
7.	"Here I Am" (featuring Donna Missal)	Hill; Missal; Wing; Sega Bodega; Tommy King	Hill; Sega Bodega; King	3:14
8.	"Honey Boba Boy"	Hill; Wing; Spiro	Hill; Wing; Spiro	3:58
9.	"Poquito Mas"	Hill; Kirby; Taylor; Spiro	Hill; Bartees Strange; Spiro	2:28
10.	"If I Could Say"	Hill; Kwapis; Amir Yanghmai	Hill; Kwapis	2:23
Total length:				33:11
