= Oskar Sikow =

Swedish record producer and songwriter

- Born: Oskar Engström; Stockholm, Sweden
- Occupations: record producer, songwriter
- Member of: Snow Culture
- Formerly of: Kate Boy

Oskar Sikow (Oskar Engström) is a RIAA Gold-awarded record producer and songwriter from Stockholm, Sweden. Sikow has collaborated with artists such as Kacy Hill, LANY, Skott, Erik Hassle, among others. He was a founding member of the alternative pop band Kate Boy but left the band in 2013, and of late has started the new artist project Snow Culture together with Swedish artist and songwriter Ana Diaz.

== Production and writing credits ==
Year	Artist	Track	Album
2013	Erik Hassle	"Talk About It" (Writer, Producer)	Innocence Lost
2013	Erik Hassle	"Talk About It feat. Elliphant (Sikow remix)"	
2014	Marlene	"Indian Summer" (Writer, Producer) "I Do This For You" (Writer, Co-Producer) "Lavender Fields" (Writer, Producer)	Indian Summer
2014	Julia Vero	"How Does It Feel" (Writer, Producer)	How Does It Feel
2015	LANY	"ILYSB" (Writer)	Make Out
2015	Kate Boy	"Northern Lights" (Writer, Producer) "In Your Eyes" (Writer, Producer) "The Way We Are" (Writer, Producer) "Lion For Real" (Writer, Producer) "When I Was Young" (Writer, Producer)	One
2015	Giorgio Moroder	"I Do This For You (feat. Marlene)" (Writer)	Déjà Vu
2015	Sirena	"You Are The Shore" (Writer, Producer) "Chemicals" (Producer)	Hearts EP
2016	Skott	"Wolf" (Writer, Producer)	Porcelain / Wolf
2016	WENS	"Bones" (Producer)	Bones
2016	Matt Woods	"Nothing Less" (Writer, Co-Producer)	Ain't No Use
2016	Matt Woods	"Stop" (Writer, Co-Producer)	Re:Connection
2017	Snow Culture	"No Sleep" (Writer, Producer) "The Box" (Writer, Producer) "Paris" (Writer, Producer) "Slow Down" (Writer, Producer) "Intro" (Writer, Producer)	EP1
2017	Snow Culture	"Cold" (Producer)	
2017	Kacy Hill	"Hard To Love" (Writer, Co-Producer) "Like A Woman" (Writer) "Keep Me Sane" (Writer/Additional Production) "Cruel" (Writer, Producer) "Static" (Writer/Additional Production)	Like A Woman
2017	The Sound Of Arrows	"The Greatest" "Moment In The Sun"	Stay Free
2017	Marlene	"Miss You A Little" (Writer, Co-Producer)	Single
2017	Marlene	"Beautiful Life" (Writer, Co-Producer)	Sweet
2018	Bipolar Sunshine	"Pressure" (Writer, Producer)	Single
2018	CXLOE	"Show You" (co-producer)	Single
2018	KSHMR	"Magic" (Writer)	
2019	CXLOE	"I Can't Have Nice Things" (Writer, Producer)	Single
2019	Snow Culture	"Treasures" (Writer/Producer)	Single
2019	Son Of A Bishop	"Fall" (Writer/Producer)	Are We There
2019	Son Of A Bishop	"Love Left Me Lonely" (Writer, Producer)	Are We There
2019	Son Of A Bishop	"The End" (Writer/Producer)	Are We There
2019	Son Of A Bishop	"Bad" (Writer/Producer)	Are We There
2019	LPX	Black & White (Writer/Producer)	Junk For The Heart
2020	Winona Oak	"He Don't Love Me" (Writer/Producer)	CLOSURE
2020	Winona Oak	"Break My Broken Heart" (Writer/Producer)	CLOSURE
2020	Winona Oak	"Lonely Hearts Club" (Writer/Producer)	CLOSURE
2020	Winona Oak	"Let Me Know" (Writer/Producer)	CLOSURE
2020	Allie X	"Sculpture" (Writer/Producer)	
