= 3500 =

Single by Travis Scott featuring Future and 2 Chainz

from the album Rodeo
- Released: June 8, 2015
- Recorded: 2015
- Genre: Trap
- Length: 7:41
- Label: Grand Hustle; Epic
- Songwriters: Jacques Webster; Nayvadius Wilburn; Tauheed Epps; Emmanuel Nickerson; Leland Wayne; Xavier Dotson; Michael Dean; Allen Ritter
- Producers: Travis Scott; Allen Ritter; Mano; Metro Boomin; Mike Dean; Zaytoven

Travis Scott singles chronology
| "Mamacita" (2014) | "3500" (2015) | "Antidote" (2015) |

Future singles chronology
| "Fuck Up Some Commas" (2015) | "3500" (2015) | "Blasé" (2015) |

2 Chainz singles chronology
| "Double Tap" (2015) | "3500" (2015) | "Watch Out" (2015) |

"3500" is a song by the American rapper Travis Scott featuring fellow American rappers Future and 2 Chainz, from the former's debut studio album, Rodeo (2015). It was released as the album's lead single on June 8, 2015, following several teasers earlier in the month. Both rappers wrote the track alongside Allen Ritter, Mano, Metro Boomin, Mike Dean, and Zaytoven, who produced it with Scott. The song was originally made during a session with Kanye West, who wanted to release it as a single for his album, The Life of Pablo (2016), before giving it to Scott. Musically, "3500" is a dark trap song with themes of drug use and being "real", with the title referencing a New York Post headline about American media personality Kim Kardashian.

"3500" received positive reviews from music critics upon release, with most praising the production and each rapper's performance, and it has since been cited as one of Scott's best songs. Commercially, it charted on the Billboard Hot 100 and Hot R&B/Hip-Hop Songs charts at numbers 82 and 25, respectively. Scott has since performed the single at live shows, with certain performances receiving either praise or criticism from media outlets due to Scott's actions during them.

== Background and recording ==
According to Travis Scott, "3500" started off as a song created for American rapper Kanye West's then-upcoming album, The Life of Pablo (2016), while the two were in Malibu, and was intended to release as a single for it. This version had a "completely different beat" and a different verse by Scott, which West turned into a refrain by chopping and rearranging parts of it with an ASR-10. (Note: Producer Mano has contested this, claiming that he chopped Scott's vocals by himself at West's request using Logic Pro.) The song also wen't under a different name during its early work, such as "I Been Trill," "Only Trill Niggas I Know" and "Thirtyfivehunna." Scott later convinced West to let him take the song for himself, with Scott and his producers reworking the beat after he was unable to get West to record a feature. During the last week of production for Rodeo, Scott stayed at West's home, where they listened to the album "over and over."

== Composition and lyrics ==
"3500" features a dark trap beat produced by Scott alongside Mano, Mike Dean, and Metro Boomin, with additional production from Allen Ritter and Zaytoven. Ritter, Dean, and Zaytoven laid the track's keyboards, and Dean also plays a guitar. Each rapper delivers a verse, with Scott and Future's verses being rapped melodically.

Most of Scott and Future's lyrics on "3500" reference drugs. The former sings the refrain, where he asserts that he only associates with "trill niggas" and is "movin' slow" throughout a city due to taking 30 mg percocets, which only "real niggas" can handle. He states that he spent US$3,500 for a fur coat, referencing a headline by the New York Post that claimed American media personality Kim Kardashian had bought one at the same price for her daughter, North West. Future notes his addiction to promethazine, saying it can be smelled in his urine, and prays to God that he will be brought more cough syrup manufactured by Actavis.

2 Chainz's verse, in contrast, is intentionally humorous and delivered with misplaced confidence. The lyrics center on the claim that he has always been "real", such as stating that he had a "mean mug", kinky hair, and a styrofoam cup to drink breast milk out of as a newborn, or that drug paraphernalia can be seen in his baby pictures. He further flexes his wealth by pointing out how large and "elegant" his residence is, also referencing his Chevrolet Chevelle car and having a TV by his swimming pool.

== Release and reception ==
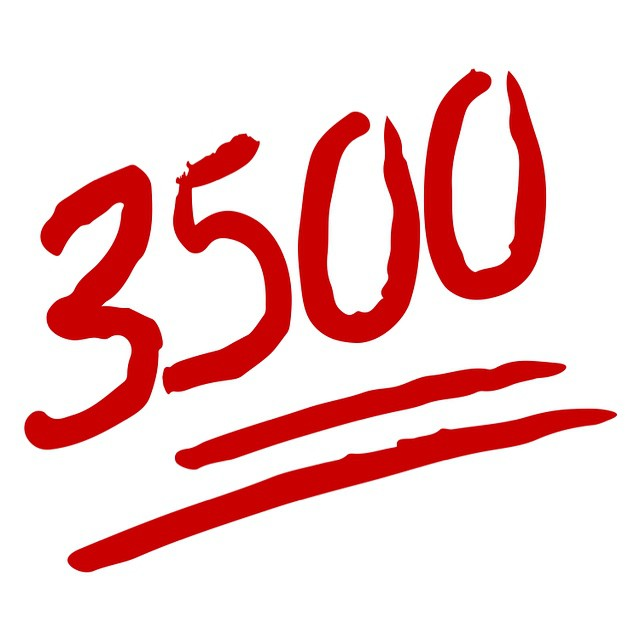
The emoji made by Corey Damon Black to promote the single release of "3500".

On June 5, 2015, Scott announced the song's title, featured artists, three of its producers, and the single's cover art on his Instagram account. The art was shot by Nabil Elderkin, and the version used in Scott's post stylized 2 Chainz's name as "II Chainz", which was likely changed due to it reading similar to "11 Chainz". He then posted an emoji designed by Corey Damon Black of the song's title, stylized the same as the "100" emoji, and claimed an app featuring it would release alongside the single. Two days later, Scott premiered the song live at Hot97's Summer Jam 2015 festival without 2 Chainz's verse, and confirmed that it would be released the following day in a post-event interview. It was subsequently released as Rodeo's lead single on June 8 through Epic Records and Grand Hustle Records as a digital download on iTunes.

"3500" received positive reviews from music critics. HotNewHipHop's Angus Walker dubbed it a "banger" and praised the credited producers as the best "production lineup" of any track released that year, excluding West's 2015 single "All Day", which also featured production from Scott, Dean, and Ritter. In a retrospective review for the same website, Alexander Cole noted the "amazing production" by Metro Boomin and felt each rapper "brings their best" during their verses, with 2 Chainz's being the most memorable one. Zach Frydenlund of Complex put "3500" 20th on the publication's list of Scott's best songs, giving praise to the refrain and both guest verses, especially 2 Chainz's. Billboard critic Ashley Iasimone placed it on a similar list in 2017.

== Live performances ==
Scott first performed "3500" live during the pre-show for the 2015 BET Awards, where he was joined by 2 Chainz before seamlessly transitioning the song into the single "Antidote", which he had released earlier that day. He later played it as part of his set at Billboard Winterfest 2016 in January, which the publication's staff deemed a highlight.

Scott was criticized by media outlets following a performance of the song in Toronto, where he allowed a white fan to recite the line "only trill niggas I know" after giving them the man his microphone. Scott had specifically invited the fan to sing it, as he noticed their similar hats while performing the refrain, and later asked him to repeat it, considering the moment to be overall inspiring since "Nobody wanted to see me and you fuckin' with each other tonight in Toronto." During a performance at Rolling Loud in 2017, Scott gifted a fan one of his "favorite" rings for perfectly reciting every lyric to "3500", being the second time he had gifted a fan a ring after another jumped off a balcony and broke their legs the previous week. The gesture was received positively by outlets and seen as an act of kindness, with Mark F. of HotNewHipHop claiming that "[n]o one can say that Travis Scott doesn't show his fans love."

== Commercial performance ==
"3500" debuted at number 82 on the US Billboard Hot 100 chart on the week of June 27, 2015, with 43,000 copies sold in its first week. On January 11, 2017, the song was certified gold by the Recording Industry Association of America (RIAA) for sales of over 500,000 digital copies in the United States, and later went platinum in the country on August 28, 2024, for selling over 1,000,000 copies.

== Charts ==
=== Weekly charts ===
Chart performance for "3500"
| Chart (2015) | Peak position |
|---|---|
| US Billboard Hot 100 | 82 |
| US Hot R&B/Hip-Hop Songs (Billboard) | 25 |

== Certifications ==
Certifications for "3500"
| Region | Certification | Certified units/sales |
|---|---|---|
| New Zealand (RMNZ) | Gold | 15,000^{‡} |
| Poland (ZPAV) | Gold | 25,000^{‡} |
| United States (RIAA) | Platinum | 1,000,000^{‡} |
^{‡} Sales+streaming figures based on certification alone.
