= Phase (Jack Garratt album) =

Studio album by Jack Garratt
- Released: 19 February 2016
- Recorded: 2014–2015
- Studio: Limbo and Ravenscourt, London; Medley, Copenhagen
- Genre: Indie pop; alternative R&B; electronic
- Length: 46:53
- Label: Island; Interscope
- Producer: Jack Garratt, Mike Spencer

Jack Garratt chronology
Apple Music Festival: London 2015 (2015)	Phase (2016)	Love, Death & Dancing (2020)

Singles from Phase
- 1. "The Love You're Given" Released: 15 December 2014; 2. "Chemical" Released: 19 February 2015; 3. "Weathered" Released: 12 July 2015; 4. "Breathe Life" Released: 16 October 2015; 5. "Worry" Released: 11 December 2015; 6. "Surprise Yourself" Released: 25 April 2016; 7. "Far Cry" Released: 19 August 2016

Phase is the debut studio album by the English singer and songwriter Jack Garratt, released on 19 February 2016 by Island Records internationally and by Interscope Records in the United States. It debuted at number 3 on the UK Albums Chart on sales of 18,198.

== Critical reception ==
Professional ratings
Aggregate scores
Source	Rating
AnyDecentMusic?	6.3/10
Metacritic	64/100
Review scores
Source	Rating
AllMusic	3.5/5 stars
The Daily Telegraph	4/5 stars
Entertainment Weekly	B−
The Guardian	3/5 stars
The Irish Times	4/5 stars
NME	3/5
The Observer	3/5 stars
Pitchfork	5.6/10
Q	3/5 stars
Uncut	7/10

At Metacritic, which assigns a normalized rating out of 100 to reviews from mainstream critics, the album received an average score of 64, based on 15 reviews.

Writing for Exclaim!, Paula Reid called Phase "a strong start to Garratt's career", praising his vocal and lyrical work.

== Track listing ==
No.	Title	Writer(s)	Producer(s)	Length
1.	"Coalesce (Synesthesia Pt. II)"	Jack Garratt	Garratt	2:23
2.	"Breathe Life"	Garratt	Garratt	4:23
3.	"Far Cry"	Garratt; Anthony Kilhoffer	Garratt	3:54
4.	"Weathered"	Garratt	Garratt; Mike Spencer	4:35
5.	"Worry"	Garratt; Bastian Langebæk	Garratt; Carassius Gold	4:03
6.	"The Love You're Given"	Garratt; Lisa Fischer; Tom Hammer	Garratt	5:00
7.	"I Know All What I Do"	Garratt	Garratt; Brett Cox	3:03
8.	"Surprise Yourself"	Garratt	Garratt; Mike Spencer	4:21
9.	"Chemical"	Garratt	Garratt	3:35
10.	"Fire"	Garratt	Garratt	4:18
11.	"Synesthesia Pt. III"	Garratt	Garratt	2:26
12.	"My House Is Your Home"	Garratt	Garratt	4:58
Total length:				46:53

Deluxe edition bonus disc
No.	Title	Writer(s)	Length
1.	"Falling"	Garratt & Henry Brill	3:59
2.	"Water"	Garratt	3:40
3.	"I Couldn't Want You Anyway"	Garratt	4:35
4.	"Remnants"	Garratt	5:57
5.	"Synesthesia, Pt. I"	Garratt	3:49
6.	"Lonesome Valley"	Garratt	5:42
7.	"Water" (acoustic)	Garratt	4:55

== Personnel ==
- Jack Garratt – vocals, all instruments, drum programming, production, mixing
- Mike Spencer – additional bass, guitars and keyboards, mixing, production ("Weathered" and "Surprise Yourself")
- Carassius Gold – mixing ("Worry")
- Brett Cox – mixing ("Coalesce (Synesthesia Pt. II)", "I Know All What I Do", "Fire", "Far Cry", "Synesthesia Pt. III" and "My House Is Your Home")
- Stuart Hawkes – mastering
- Zoë Zimmer – design, photography, art direction

== Charts ==
Chart (2016)	Peak position
Australian Albums (ARIA)	9
Austrian Albums (Ö3 Austria)	34
Belgian Albums (Ultratop Flanders)	18
Belgian Albums (Ultratop Wallonia)	88
Dutch Albums (Album Top 100)	21
Irish Albums (IRMA)	20
Italian Albums (FIMI)	63
New Zealand Albums (RMNZ)	37
Scottish Albums (OCC)	4
Swiss Albums (Schweizer Hitparade)	7
UK Albums (OCC)	3
US Billboard 200	127

== Certifications ==
Region	Certification	Certified units/sales
United Kingdom (BPI)	Gold	100,000^{‡}
^{‡} Sales+streaming figures based on certification alone.
