= Pick Up the Phone (Young Thug and Travis Scott song) =

2016 single by Young Thug and Travis Scott featuring Quavo

Single by Young Thug and Travis Scott featuring Quavo

from the album Jeffery and Birds in the Trap Sing McKnight
- Released: June 3, 2016
- Recorded: 2015–16
- Genre: Dirty rap; trap
- Length: 4:12
- Label: Grand Hustle; Epic; Atlantic; 300
- Songwriters: Jeffery Williams; Jacques Webster II; Quavious Marshall; Anderson Hernandez; Adam Feeney; Michael Dean; Brittany Hazzard; Allen Ritter
- Producers: Vinylz; Frank Dukes; Ritter; Dean

Young Thug singles chronology
"Minnesota" (2016)	"Pick Up the Phone" (2016)	"No Limit" (2016)

Travis Scott singles chronology
"Wonderful" (2016)	"Pick Up the Phone" (2016)	"Champions" (2016)

Quavo singles chronology
"Minnesota" (2016)	"Pick Up the Phone" (2016)	"Champions" (2016)

Music video
- "Pick Up the Phone" on YouTube

"Pick Up the Phone" (stylized in all lowercase on Birds in the Trap Sing McKnight) is a song by American rappers Young Thug and Travis Scott featuring fellow American rapper Quavo. It was released on June 3, 2016, by Grand Hustle Records, Epic Records, Atlantic Records and 300 Entertainment. It is the lead single from Thug's mixtape Jeffery (2016) and the second single from Scott's second studio album Birds in the Trap Sing McKnight (2016). The song was written by the artists alongside Starrah, who provides additional vocals, and producers Vinylz, Allen Ritter, Frank Dukes, and Mike Dean.

== Background and controversy ==
Young Thug first previewed the song in a snippet that he posted on his Instagram account in March 2016. The song was originally a collaboration between Young Thug and Starrah. Starrah sang the hook instead of Travis. Travis was in the studio when Thug recorded the song, and he wrote the bridge Young Thug sings. About a month later, Travis started playing the song in clubs, but instead of Starrah on the hook, Travis replaced her, and he had his own verse too. He also called the song his own single for his own album without notifying Young Thug of his involvement. Travis kept teasing the song for months before he finally leaked it on his own SoundCloud because the labels would not release it. After Travis called his manager Lyor Cohen, who also owns 300 Entertainment, Thug's record label, an agreement was made that the song would be released on iTunes later that day as a joint single between Thug and Travis.

== Commercial performance ==
"Pick Up the Phone" debuted at number 90 on Billboard Hot 100 for the chart dated for the week of September 3, 2016. The song eventually peaked at number 43, becoming one of Young Thug’s highest charting song at the time. This was also Quavo's highest charting solo effort before his appearance on Post Malone's "Congratulations", which peaked at number 8 on the Hot 100, then later his appearance on DJ Khaled's, "I'm the One", which debuted and peaked at number one on the chart. The song was certified double platinum by the Recording Industry Association of America (RIAA) in May 2017, for selling over two million digital copies in the United States.

== Music video ==
The music video premiered on August 12, 2016 with the music video for "90210" at the ".wav party" in Los Angeles, California, with both of them later released on Travis Scott's Vevo account on YouTube.

== Charts ==
=== Weekly charts ===
Chart (2016)	Peak position
Australia Urban (ARIA)	17
Canada Hot 100 (Billboard)	62
France (SNEP)	95
New Zealand Heatseekers (Recorded Music NZ)	7
UK Singles (Official Charts)	181
US Billboard Hot 100	43
US Hot R&B/Hip-Hop Songs (Billboard)	12
US Rhythmic Airplay (Billboard)	14

=== Year-end charts ===
Chart (2016)	Position
US Hot R&B/Hip-Hop Songs (Billboard)	52

== Certifications ==
Region	Certification	Certified units/sales
Brazil (Pro-Música Brasil)	Gold	30,000^{‡}
Canada (Music Canada)	3× Platinum	240,000^{‡}
Denmark (IFPI Danmark)	Gold	45,000^{‡}
France (SNEP)	Platinum	200,000^{‡}
Italy (FIMI)	Gold	25,000^{‡}
New Zealand (RMNZ)	3× Platinum	90,000^{‡}
Poland (ZPAV)	Gold	25,000^{‡}
Sweden (GLF)	Gold	20,000^{‡}
United Kingdom (BPI)	Platinum	600,000^{‡}
United States (RIAA)	5× Platinum	5,000,000^{‡}
^{‡} Sales+streaming figures based on certification alone.
