= Antidote (Travis Scott song) =

2015 single by Travis Scott

Single by Travis Scott

from the album Rodeo
- Released: July 29, 2015
- Recorded: June 18, 2015
- Genre: Trap
- Length: 4:22
- Label: Grand Hustle; Epic
- Songwriters: Jacques Webster; Ebony Oshunrinde; Thomas Brenneck; David Guy; Leon Michels; Nicholas Movshon; Homer Steinweiss; Bryan Van Mierlo
- Producers: Travis Scott; WondaGurl; Eestbound

Travis Scott singles chronology
| "3500" (2015) | "Antidote" (2015) | "Whole Lotta Lovin'" (2016) |

Music video
- "Antidote" on YouTube

"Antidote" is a song by American rapper Travis Scott. It was released on July 29, 2015, as the second single from his debut studio album, Rodeo (2015). Produced by Scott alongside WondaGurl and Eestbound, the song peaked at number 16 on the US Billboard Hot 100 chart. "Antidote" has since been certified septuple platinum by the Recording Industry Association of America (RIAA).

== Background ==
The song was first heard when Travis Scott performed it live at JMBLYA. It was later released on June 21, 2015. "Antidote" was not initially intended to appear on Rodeo, as confirmed on Scott's SoundCloud on June 23, 2015: "This is for the real fans; the real ragers! This is some vibes for the summer. This isn’t on Rodeo… it’s coming soon." However, due to the song's popularity, Scott included the track on his debut album. On July 29, 2015, "Antidote" was released via digital distribution as the album's second single. The song samples "All I Need" by Lee Fields and The Expressions.

== Music video ==
On September 3, 2015, a teaser for the "Antidote" music video was uploaded on Scott's Vevo channel. The video premiered on September 18, 2015. The music video features Dominican models Yaris Sanchez and Ayisha Diaz and rapper Rich Hil (with green hair).

== Live performances ==
On September 23, 2015, Travis Scott performed "Antidote", live on national television, on Jimmy Kimmel Live!. On November 17, 2015, in between dates on The Weeknd's "Madness Fall Tour," Travis Scott appeared on Late Night with Seth Meyers, where he performed a medley of "Antidote" and "Pray 4 Love".

== Charts ==
=== Weekly charts ===
Weekly chart performance for "Antidote"
| Chart (2015–2016) | Peak position |
|---|---|
| Belgium (Ultratip Bubbling Under Flanders) | 75 |
| Canada (Canadian Hot 100) | 38 |
| France (SNEP) | 120 |
| US Billboard Hot 100 | 16 |
| US Hot R&B/Hip-Hop Songs (Billboard) | 7 |
| US Pop Airplay (Billboard) | 25 |
| US Rhythmic Airplay (Billboard) | 1 |

=== Year-end charts ===
2016 year-end chart performance for "Antidote"
| Chart (2016) | Position |
|---|---|
| US Billboard Hot 100 | 75 |
| US Hot R&B/Hip-Hop Songs (Billboard) | 27 |
| US Rhythmic (Billboard) | 16 |

== Certifications ==
Sales and certifications for "Antidote"
| Region | Certification | Certified units/sales |
|---|---|---|
| Australia (ARIA) | Gold | 35,000^{‡} |
| Brazil (Pro-Música Brasil) | 2× Platinum | 120,000^{‡} |
| Canada (Music Canada) | 2× Platinum | 160,000^{‡} |
| Denmark (IFPI Danmark) | Gold | 45,000^{‡} |
| New Zealand (RMNZ) | 2× Platinum | 60,000^{‡} |
| Poland (ZPAV) | Gold | 25,000^{‡} |
| United Kingdom (BPI) | Gold | 400,000^{‡} |
| United States (RIAA) | 7× Platinum | 7,000,000^{‡} |
^{‡} Sales+streaming figures based on certification alone.

== Radio and release history ==
Release dates for "Antidote"
| Region | Date | Format | Label |
|---|---|---|---|
| New Zealand | July 28, 2015 | Digital download | Grand Hustle; Epic |
| United States | August 2015 | Urban contemporary | Grand Hustle; Epic |
