= Bloo (EP) =

EP by Kacy Hill
- Released: 9 October 2015
- Recorded: 2014–15
- Genre: Dream pop; alternative R&B
- Length: 21:00
- Label: GOOD Music; Def Jam Recordings; PMR Recordings
- Producer: Bodhi; Kacy Hill; Jack Garratt; William Phillips; Stuart Price; RKCB; Yung Gud

Kacy Hill chronology
Bloo (2015)	Like a Woman (2017)

Singles from Bloo
- 1. "Foreign Fields" Released: 16 September 2015

Bloo is the debut extended play by American model, singer and songwriter Kacy Hill. It was released through GOOD Music, Def Jam Recordings and PMR Recordings on 9 October 2015.

== Background ==
In 2014, Hill signed with GOOD Music, a record label run by Kanye West, and later with Def Jam Recordings. Her debut single, "Experience", was released on 14 September 2014.

In 2015, Hill announced that she was working on writing and producing new music, specifically a song called "Foreign Fields". Early in the second half of 2015, she revealed the details of her debut EP, Bloo, with "Foreign Fields" being the lead single. The single was released on 16 September 2015, and the EP was released on 9 October 2015.

In early 2016, Hill embarked on a tour as a guest act alongside Jack Garratt, who co-produced Bloo.

== Track listing ==
No.	Title	Writer(s)	Producer(s)	Length
1.	"Foreign Fields"	Kacy Hill; Jack Garratt	Garratt	3:41
2.	"Arm's Length"	Hill; William Phillips	Stuart Price; Phillips^{[a]}	3:20
3.	"Shades of Blue"	Hill; Casey Barth; Riley Knapp	RKCB; Hill	4:10
4.	"Foreign Fields (Yung Gud Remix)"	Hill; Garratt	Garratt; Yung Gud^{[b]}	5:07
5.	"Arm's Length (Bodhi Remix)"	Hill; Phillips	Price; Phillips^{[a]}; Bodhi^{[b]}	5:06
Total length:				21:00

Notes

- ^{^[a]} indicates an additional producer
- ^{^[b]} indicates a re-mixer
