= Like a Woman =

Studio album by Kacy Hill
- Released: June 30, 2017
- Length: 40:30
- Labels: G.O.O.D.; Def Jam
- Producers: Burns; Dan Heath; DJDS; DJ Mustard; Oskar Sikow; Robin Hannibal; Stuart Price; Terrace Martin; William Phillips

Kacy Hill chronology
Bloo (2015)	Like a Woman (2017)	Is It Selfish If We Talk About Me Again (2020)

Singles from Like a Woman
- 1. "Lion" Released: July 8, 2016; 2. "Like a Woman" Released: May 12, 2017; 3. "Hard to Love" Released: May 12, 2017; 4. "Keep Me Sane" Released: June 23, 2017

Like a Woman is the debut studio album by American singer Kacy Hill. It was released on June 30, 2017, by G.O.O.D. Music and Def Jam Recordings.

Professional ratings
Review scores
Source	Rating
The AU Review	8/10 stars
Highsnobiety	3.5/5 stars
Metro Weekly	4/5 stars
The Music	4/5 stars
Pitchfork	5.1/10
Press Play OK	4/5 stars
Rolling Stone Australia	4/5 stars
The Daily Telegraph	4/5 stars
X-Press Magazine	7/10 stars

== Track listing ==
Like a Woman
No.	Title	Writer(s)	Producer(s)	Length
1.	"Like a Woman"	Kacy Hill; Oskar Engström; Dijon McFarlane; Terrace Martin; Roger Troutman; Larry Troutman; Shirley Murdock	DJ Mustard; Martin; DJDS^{[a]}	3:13
2.	"Keep Me Sane"	Hill; Engström; Matt Parad; Jerome Potter; Samuel Griesemer	DJDS	3:49
3.	"Cruel"	Hill; Engström	Oskar Sikow; Stuart Price^{[b]}	3:50
4.	"Hard to Love"	Hill; Engström	Price; Oskar Sikow^{[b]}	3:24
5.	"Static"	Hill; Engström; Potter; Griesemer	DJDS	3:35
6.	"First Time"	Hill; Andrew Wyatt	Price	3:32
7.	"Arm's Length"	Hill; William Phillips	Price; Phillips^{[b]}	3:23
8.	"Interlude"	Hill; Potter; Griesemer	DJDS	1:27
9.	"Clarity"	Hill; Dan Heath	Heath	4:26
10.	"Lion"	Hill; Jamie Hartman	Price	3:18
11.	"Say You're Wrong"	Hill; Matthew Burns; Autumn Rowe	Price; BURNS^{[b]}	2:50
12.	"Am I"	Hill; Philip Glass; Robin Braun	Robin Hannibal	3:37
Total length:				40:30

Notes

- ^{^[a]} signifies a co-producer
- ^{^[b]} signifies an additional producer

Sample credits

- “Am I” contains elements of “Closing” by Philip Glass

== Personnel ==
Credits adapted from AllMusic.

- Matthew Burns – composer
- Oskar Sikow – composer
- Philip Glass – composer
- Samuel Griesemer – composer
- Robin Hannibal – composer
- Jamie Hartman – composer
- Dan Heath – composer
- Kacy Hill – composer, primary artist
- Terrace Martin – composer
- Dijon McFarlane – composer
- Shirley Murdock – composer
- Matt Parad – composer
- William Phillips – composer
- Jerome Potter – composer
- Autumn Rowe – composer
- Larry Troutman – composer
- Roger Troutman – composer
- Andrew Wyatt – composer
