= Sy Ari da Kid =

American singer

- Born: Sy Ari Brockington; January 8, 1986 (age 40); New York City, U.S.
- Genres: R&B
- Occupations: Singer; songwriter; rapper; record producer; radio host; broadcaster
- Years active: 2011–present
- Labels: Arrogant Music; Cash Money; Republic

Sy Ari Brockington (born January 8, 1986), known professionally as Sy Ari da Kid, is an American singer, songwriter, and broadcaster.

== Early life ==
Brockington was born in The Bronx, New York City but moved to Atlanta, Georgia at the age of nine. As a child he dreamed of being a professional basketball player, but soon turned to rap after the influence of his brother and cousin. He attended Robert L. Osborne High School, alongside rapper K Camp. After graduation, Brockington would appear in battle raps on Atlanta's HOT 107.9 FM, where he was noted for 11 consecutive victories.

== Career ==
Brockington taught himself to produce and record with Pro Tools, which soon caught the attention of Grammy Award winning songwriter and producer Brian Michael Cox. Signed to December First Publishing Group, Brockington later launched Arrogant Music in 2006, through which he distributes his releases.

He released some mixtapes in 2011, including The Ultrasound, his first formal solo project. It was followed by three mixtapes in January 2012, including two installments in his The Best of Da Kid series. In the following years, he continued to release multiple mixtapes while working with artists including Waka Flocka Flame, Future, Travis Porter and Roscoe Dash.

On February 4, 2016, Brockington released the fourth entry in his Heartbreak series: B4 the Heartbreak, which featured Bryson Tiller on its lead single "Priorities". The mixtape also included features from Chasity, Lewis Sky and Tink. He later confirmed a follow-up project was in the making, titled 2Soon. He signed with Birdman's Cash Money Records in 2017, who released the mixtape on May 10 of that year. He parted ways with the label in April 2019.

== Artistry ==
Talking about his musical process, Brockington said, "I don't write. I like to freestyle until I come off with a good hook or a good start to a verse. I don't like creating from scratch with other artists and producers as much as I should." He also felt he was not narrowed down by a single genre. He said, "I'm not an Atlanta or New York rapper, I feel I'm beyond a rapper. I like all genres of music and can create them as well".

In late 2015, rumours circulated that Brockington was ghostwriting for Canadian rapper Drake. After releasing a song with Quentin Miller, who Meek Mill exposed as a co-writer for Drake, Brockington was forced to distance himself from the suggestions.

== Personal life ==
Brockington is a single father, something he regularly discusses in interviews. He describes how he wants to be a voice for single fathers, of which there are few in his industry who openly speak about the topic.

== Discography ==
- The Ultrasound (2011)
- Kendall's Bumsauce (2012)
- Bad Boys For Life (2012)
- The Definition of Definition (2012)
- Kendall's Bumsauce 2 (2012)
- Workaholics (2012)
- Civil War 2: 2 Sides of a Story (2013)
- The Lake Show (2013)
- The Ultrasound 2: The Birth (2014)
- S.O.O.N. (Something Out Of Nothing) (2015)
- The Heartbreak Kid 3 (2015)
- Politically End Correct (2015)
- B4 the Heartbreak (2016)
- 2 Soon (2017)
- 2 Weeks No Diss (2017)
- Better Safe Than Sy Ari (2018)
- After The Heartbreak (2018)
- Emancipation Proclamation (2019)
- 2 Sides Of A Story (with Paxquiao) (2019)
- It Was Unwritten (2020)
- A Toxic Heartbreak (2020)
- 3 to 5 Business Days (2020)
- Anti Industry Me (2020)
- It's Not You It's Me (2021)
- Aye I’m With It (2021)
- Sy Ari Not Sorry (2021)
- Alone But Not Lonely (2021)
- The Shadow in the Shade (2022)
- The Shadow in the Shade 2 (2022)
- Toxicity at it's [sic] Finest (2023)
- All Gas No Breaks (with Paxquio) (2023)
- Northside Dreams, Southside Nightmares (with Paxquiao) (2023)
- Sy Ari & R&B Friends (2023)
- Outside Looking In (2024)
- Valentines (2024)
- Toxic Traits (2024)
- Happily Never After (2024)
- The Last Shadow In The Shade (2025)
- My Next Ex (2025)
- Sy Ari Not Sorry 2 (2025)
- You Don’t Know Me yet, but Your Mine (2026)
