= 90210 (song) =

2015 song by Travis Scott featuring Kacy Hill

Song by Travis Scott featuring Kacy Hill

from the album Rodeo
- Released: September 4, 2015
- Recorded: 2014
- Genre: Progressive rap; alternative hip hop
- Length: 5:39
- Label: Grand Hustle; Epic
- Songwriters: Jacques Webster II; Kacy Hill; Michael Dean; Allen Ritter; Dacoury Natche; Ebony Oshunrinde; Chantel Jeffries; Glenda Proby; Diulio Radici; Ugo Fusco
- Producers: Travis Scott; Dean; Ritter; DJ Dahi; WondaGurl

Music video
- "90210" on YouTube

"90210" is a song by American rapper Travis Scott from his debut studio album Rodeo (2015). It features American singer Kacy Hill and background vocals from Chantel Jeffries. Produced by Scott himself, Mike Dean, Allen Ritter, DJ Dahi and WondaGurl, the song samples "Itinerario Romantico" by the Blue Sharks.

== Composition ==
In the lyrics, Travis Scott sings about a lost girl in the world of Hollywood. The song features a beat switch; the mood of the first two and a half minutes have been described as one of "haunting gloom" and despair, while the second half has been described as "soulful".

== Critical reception & Response ==
The song received generally positive reviews from music critics. Josephine Cruz of Hypebeast considered it a standout on Rodeo with a "sample that would surely get the Kanye stamp of approval". Reviewing the album for XXL, Roger Krastz wrote "As far as his lyrical delivery on the project, Travi$ depends heavily on the presence of his bleak yet melodic auto-tune and vocal effects, and while he's never been known as a rapper with superb bars and lyrics, he shows he has a flow that caters strictly to his style of hip-hop. Case in point his track '90210,' in which Travi$ delivers some witty lines". Matthew Ramirez of Spin mentioned the part of the song that "sounds like Castlevania" to be among the "blow-your-hair-back moments" from Rodeo. Sheldon Pearce of Pitchfork cited it as one of the tracks "revealing stunningly posh second acts".

In 2025, a sped up version of the track became associated with a popular internet meme involving the Marvel superhero Mister Fantastic and the online video game Marvel Rivals.

== Music video ==
An official music video was directed by Hype Williams and first premiered on August 12, 2016 during Travis Scott's ".wav party" in Los Angeles, alongside the video for "Pick Up the Phone", before being released exclusively via Apple Music on August 18, 2016. According to Scott, it took four months to make the video. A stop motion clip, it shows Travis Scott as an action figure, as depicted on the Rodeo cover art. He roams the streets of Los Angeles at night and spends time with a female doll whose face is blurred. They relax on a couch, smoke, and have sex. A gigantic Travis Scott action figure tears through the city in a similar manner to Godzilla, destroying buildings, cars and signs, before peeking into a window and seeing the other Scott, who goes outside and finds a blooming tree.

The visual was released on YouTube on November 17, 2016.

== Certifications ==
Certifications for "90210"
Region	Certification	Certified units/sales
Brazil (Pro-Música Brasil)	Gold	30,000^{‡}
Denmark (IFPI Danmark)	Gold	45,000^{‡}
New Zealand (RMNZ)	2× Platinum	60,000^{‡}
Poland (ZPAV)	Gold	25,000^{‡}
United Kingdom (BPI)	Gold	400,000^{‡}
United States (RIAA)	4× Platinum	4,000,000^{‡}
^{‡} Sales+streaming figures based on certification alone.
