= The Range (musician) =

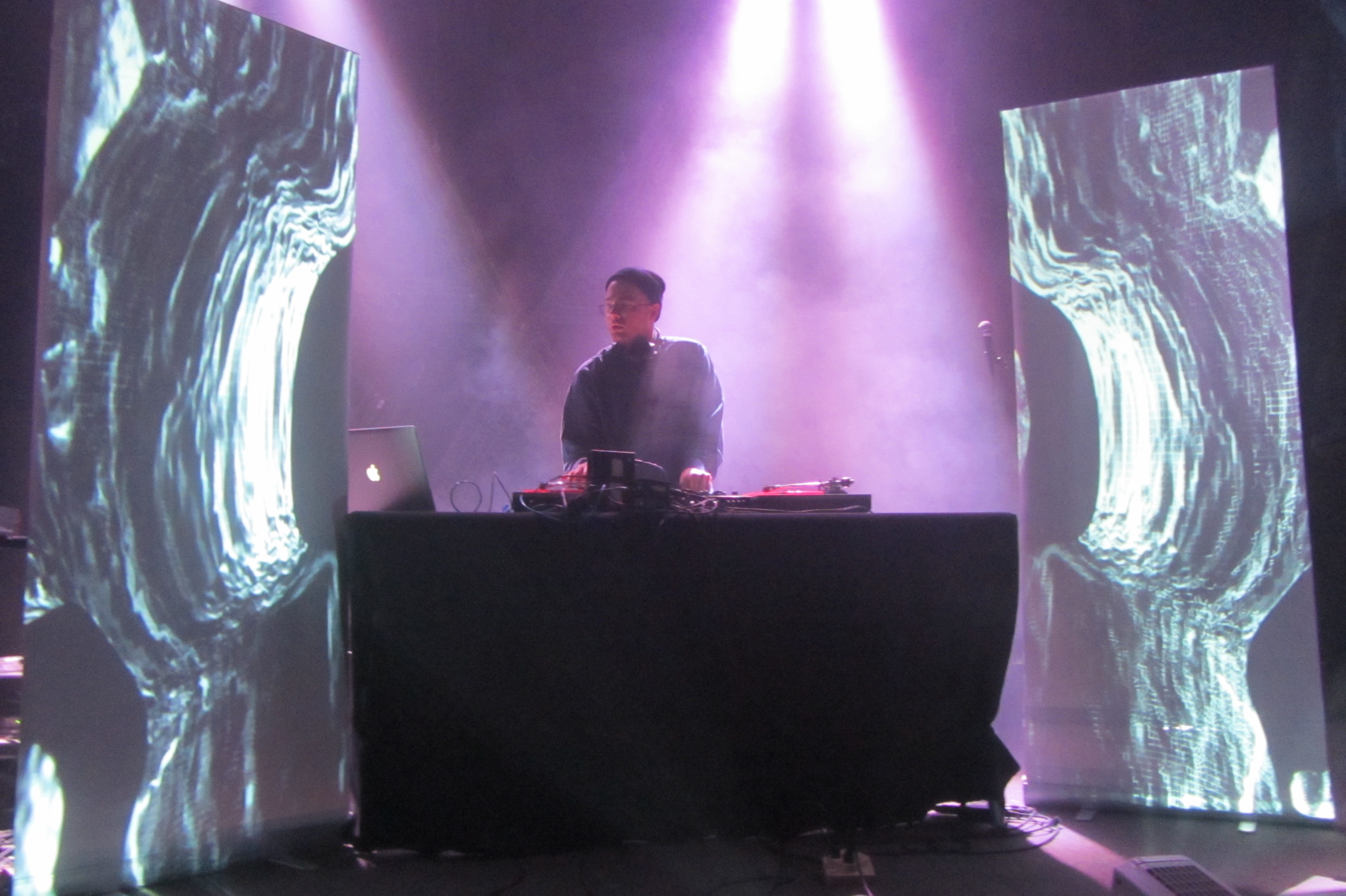
- The Range performing at the 9:30 Club in Washington, D.C., April 29, 2014.

Background information
- Born: James Hinton; September 12, 1988 (age 38); Stroudsburg, Pennsylvania
- Origin: Stroudsburg, Pennsylvania
- Genres: Baltimore club; electronic
- Occupations: Music producer; DJ
- Years active: 2002–present
- Label: Domino, Donky Pitch, Astro Nautico
- Website: www.therange.us

James Hinton (born September 12, 1988), known professionally as The Range, is an American disc jockey, electronic musician and record producer.

== Biography ==
Hinton was raised by his mother, a music teacher, on a farm in Pennsylvania. He began playing drums at about seven years old, eventually developing interests in electronic dance music and Baltimore club music as he entered his college years at Brown University. His studies at Brown included electronic music but focused most heavily on math and physics, elements of which Hinton has since incorporated into his music. Upon graduating with a degree in physics, Hinton briefly worked in a lab and as a music teacher at Brown before turning his attention full-time to his music career with the release of his 2013 album Nonfiction.

After spending much of his post-graduate music career in Providence, Rhode Island, Hinton now lives in New York City. To create his album Potential (released March 25, 2016), he spent over 200 hours scanning obscure YouTube clips for audio samples. The diversity and character of the yet unknown vocalists involved combined with the necessity in reaching out to them for permission to use their work further compelled Hinton to their stories. This led to a collaboration with director Daniel Kaufman on the documentary film Superimpose, which chronicles these stories and the aspiring artists' connection to Hinton and his music.

== Discography ==
=== Albums ===
- The Big Dip (2011)
- Nonfiction (2013)
- Potential (2016)
- Mercury (2022)

=== EPs ===
- disk (2012)
- Seneca (2013)
- Panasonic (2014)
- Breaking (2015) (with Niia)
- Strings EP (2016) (bonus 4 track vinyl included with the Potential Deluxe LP)
- Superimpose (Music From the Documentary) EP (2016)
- Providence (2019)
