= Is It Selfish If We Talk About Me Again =

Studio album by Kacy Hill
- Released: July 10, 2020
- Recorded: 2018–2020
- Genre: Indie pop; ambient pop; alternative R&B; trip hop
- Length: 35:43
- Label: Self-released
- Producer: Kacy Hill; Francis and the Lights; BJ Burton; Jim-E Stack; Cashmere Cat; Kito

Kacy Hill chronology
Like a Woman (2017)	Is It Selfish If We Talk About Me Again (2020)	Just Circling Back Here: Is It Selfish If We Talk About Me Again (Remixes) (2020)

Singles from Is It Selfish If We Talk About Me Again
- 1. "Dinner" Released: August 24, 2018; 2. "To Someone Else" Released: July 29, 2019; 3. "Much Higher" Released: October 3, 2019; 4. "I Believe in You" Released: March 17, 2020; 5. "Porsche" Released: April 10, 2020; 6. "Unkind" Released: May 8, 2020; 7. "Everybody's Mother" Released: July 10, 2020

Is it Selfish If We Talk About Me Again is the second studio album by American singer-songwriter Kacy Hill. It was released on July 10, 2020 independently, following her departure from Kanye West's label GOOD Music. Much of the album's art was shot by Chuck Grant.

The album marks Hill's debut as a producer, and was made in collaboration primarily with Francis and the Lights, BJ Burton, and Jim-E Stack, Hill's then-partner. Much of the song's lyrical content was inspired by their relationship. Lyrically, the album explores mental health, growth, and love.

== Track listing ==
Credits adapted from the album's vinyl liner notes.

No.	Title	Writer(s)	Producer(s)	Length
1.	"To Someone Else"	Kacy Hill; Francis Farewell Starlite; BJ Burton; James Stack	Francis and the Lights; Burton; Jim-E Stack; Hill	2:59
2.	"Much Higher"	Hill; Starlite; Burton; Stack	Francis and the Lights; Burton; Jim-E Stack; Hill	3:49
3.	"Just to Say"	Hill; Starlite; Burton	Francis and the Lights; Jim-E Stack; Hill; Burton^{[a]}	2:39
4.	"Porsche"	Hill; Burton; Johan Lenox; Tommy King; Daniel Aged	Burton; Jim-E Stack; Hill	3:35
5.	"I Believe in You" (featuring Francis and the Lights)	Hill; Burton; Billy Walsh; Starlite; Sam Ashworth	Burton; Francis and the Lights; Hill	3:35
6.	"Everybody's Mother"	Hill; Burton; Walsh; Ashworth	Burton; Hill	3:10
7.	"Told Me"	Hill; Starlite; Burton	Francis and the Lights; Burton; Hill	3:41
8.	"Unkind"	Hill; Stack	Jim-E Stack; Hill	3:18
9.	"Six"	Hill; Burton; King; Aged; Lenox	Jim-E Stack; Burton; Hill; King^{[a]}	2:52
10.	"Palladium"	Hill; Cashmere Cat; Maaike Lebbing; Nataliya Phillips	Cashmere Cat; Kito; Hill	3:31
11.	"Dinner"	Hill; Chelsea Lena; Stack	Jim-E Stack	2:34
Total length:				35:43

Notes

- ^{^[a]} signifies an additional producer
