= Rodeo (Travis Scott album) =

Studio album by Travis Scott
- Released: September 4, 2015
- Studios: Chalice; Conway (Los Angeles); Mike Dean's House of Hits (SoHo); No Name (California); PatchWerk (Atlanta); Playback (Santa Barbara); Premier (New York City); Sarm West Coast; Serenity West (Los Angeles)
- Genres: Hip-hop; trap
- Length: 65:26
- Labels: Grand Hustle; Epic
- Producers: Allen Ritter; Ben Billions; Charlie Heat; DJ Dahi; Eestbound; FKi; Frank Dukes; Illangelo; Kanye West; Maneesh Bidaye; Mano; Metro Boomin; Mike Dean; Pharrell Williams; Sonny Digital; Southside; TM88; Travis Scott; The Weeknd; WondaGurl

Travis Scott chronology
Days Before Rodeo (2014)	Rodeo (2015)	Birds in the Trap Sing McKnight (2016)

Alternate cover
- Deluxe edition cover (Note: No longer used on streaming services since June 2023, as the deluxe edition and standard edition have been removed in favor of one complete edition, which uses the standard artwork.)

Singles from Rodeo
- 1. "3500" Released: June 8, 2015; 2. "Antidote" Released: July 29, 2015

Rodeo is the debut studio album by American rapper Travis Scott. It was released on September 4, 2015, through Grand Hustle Records and distributed by Epic Records. The album features guest appearances from Quavo, Future, 2 Chainz, Juicy J, Kacy Hill, The Weeknd, Swae Lee, Chief Keef, Kanye West, Justin Bieber, Young Thug, Toro y Moi, and Schoolboy Q, while production was provided by Scott himself, alongside WondaGurl, Allen Ritter, Mike Dean, Metro Boomin, Frank Dukes, and Sonny Digital, among others.

Rodeo was supported by two singles: "3500" and "Antidote". The latter became his highest-charting single in the US Billboard Hot 100 at the time, peaking at number 16. The album received generally favorable reviews from critics and debuted at number three on the US Billboard 200. In August 2024, the album was certified double platinum by the Recording Industry Association of America (RIAA).

== Background ==
Travis Scott announced the release date for Rodeo through social media on July 17, 2015. In the CR Fashion Book, Scott stated his life was like a rodeo and he feels like he is trying to stay on a bucking animal:

It's like a Beyoncé concert. The carnival, the livestock, and the show are all parts of the event. I feel like that's how my life is. The carnival is like my imagination—it's the drive behind my vision. Even though I don't feel like I'm at a point where my shit is at an all time high, we're working to get there. We are working to get to the level of where your magazine is and to stand on that level. The livestock show is the road to get to where I'm going. At this point, I'm riding a bull for just eight seconds and it's hard as fuck. But we made it.

== Promotion ==
On January 26, 2015, to support the album, Scott announced he would embark on The Rodeo Tour with Young Thug and Metro Boomin. On January 27, the following day, Scott released two new songs; "High Fashion" featuring Future, and "Nothing But Net" featuring Young Thug and PartyNextDoor. However, neither of them ended up being on the final version of the album. On June 12, 2015, a track titled "Drunk" featuring Young Thug, leaked online.

=== Singles ===
On June 8, 2015, Scott released the album's lead single, "3500", which features guest appearances from American rappers Future and 2 Chainz. It peaked at number 82 on the US Billboard Hot 100.

On July 29, 2015, Scott released the album's second single, "Antidote". The song peaked at number 16 on the Billboard Hot 100.

== Critical reception ==
Professional ratings
Aggregate scores
Source	Rating
AnyDecentMusic?	5.5/10
Metacritic	64/100
Review scores
Source	Rating
AllMusic	5/5 stars
Clash	6/10
Complex	3.5/5 stars
Consequence	C
Exclaim!	6/10
HipHopDX	3.5/5
Pitchfork	6.0/10
Rolling Stone	3/5 stars
Spin	5/10
XXL	4/5

Rodeo was met with generally favorable reviews. At Metacritic, which assigns a normalized rating out of 100 to reviews from mainstream publications, the album received an average score of 64, based on 15 reviews. Aggregator AnyDecentMusic? gave it 5.5 out of 10, based on their assessment of the critical consensus.

Roger Krastz of XXL stated, "Overall, Rodeo has plenty of bangers and noteworthy collaborations that help bring out a fantastic trap sound that could bleed into the mainstream of hip-hop in no time". Jason Bisnoff of HipHopDX stated, "Rodeo's back end after "Antidote" begin to mesh together and gets repetitive.... Nonetheless, the originality of Scott's sound within this new movement provides for a strong rookie effort leaving the listener excited for a career that is just getting started". Trazier Tharpe of Complex stated, "Travis Scott made an enjoyable album for his fans peppered with undeniable bangers for his detractors". David Jeffries of AllMusic stated, "With Rodeo, Travis Scott becomes a designer drug". Steve "Flash" Juon of RapReviews stated, "Somewhere beneath all the hype and production he does shine through". Martin Caballero of The Boston Globe stated, "His versatility, combined with a high-profile guest list, conspires against him; among 14 tracks, Scott conjures just a handful of moments that hint at untapped reserves of talent".

Matthew Cooper of Clash stated, "Yes, the production is razor sharp, the beats are skewed and often very loud which makes them feel important, but in reality, it's all a façade; an image". Kevin Ritchie of Now stated, "Scott goes for spacey sounds, stoner vibes and vocal filters, but despite the eclecticism, he's too elusive and bland for Rodeo to amount to a stylistic--let alone a subversive--statement". Sheldon Pearce from Pitchfork stated, "He is most effective when he harshly distorts his vocals to create texture, and in the company of others he can serve as a welcome change of pace". David Turner from Rolling Stone stated, "Left on his own, Scott can grow tiresome. "I Can Tell" sounds monochromatic without another voice to push this astute curator. Some rock stars are better leading bands than going solo". Matthew Ramirez of Spin stated, "This is a cold, calculated record lacking in personality, though it certainly tries to deliver something that Scott is incapable of".

=== Year-end lists ===
Select year-end rankings of Rodeo
Publication	List	Rank	Ref.
Clash	Albums of the Year 2015	24	
Complex	Best Albums of 2015	36	
Pigeons & Planes	Best Albums of 2015	23	

== Commercial performance ==
Rodeo debuted at number three on the US Billboard 200, moving 85,000 album-equivalent units, of which 70,000 are pure album sales. As of November 2015, Rodeo has sold 110,000 copies in the United States. On August 28, 2024, the album was certified double platinum by the Recording Industry Association of America (RIAA) for combined sales and album-equivalent units of over two million units.

== Track listing ==
Rodeo track listing
No.	Title	Writer(s)	Producer(s)	Length
1.	"Pornography"	Jacques Webster II; Leland Wayne; Michael Dean; Sonny Uwaezuoke; Glen Fisher^{[c]}; Peter Mellin^{[c]}; Finn Olafsson^{[c]}; Torsten Olafsson^{[c]}	Travis Scott; Metro Boomin; Mike Dean; Sonny Digital	3:51
2.	"Oh My Dis Side" (featuring Quavo)	J. Webster; Quavious Marshall; Adam Feeney; Allen Ritter; Dean; Tommy Paxton-Beesley	Travis Scott; Frank Dukes; Ritter; Dean^{[a]}	5:51
3.	"3500" (featuring Future and 2 Chainz)	J. Webster; Nayvadius Wilburn; Tauheed Epps; Wayne; Dean; Emmanuel Nickerson; Ritter; Xavier Dotson	Travis Scott; Metro Boomin; Dean; Mano; Ritter^{[a]}; Zaytoven^{[a]}	7:41
4.	"Wasted" (featuring Juicy J)	J. Webster; Jordan Houston; Wayne; Feeney; Dean; Larry Price; Michael Barnett^{[d]}; Will Barnett^{[d]}; Chad Butler^{[d]}; George Clinton, Jr.^{[d]}; T. Noporat^{[d]}	Travis Scott; Metro Boomin; Frank Dukes^{[a]}; Dean^{[a]}	3:55
5.	"90210" (featuring Kacy Hill)	J. Webster; Kacy Hill; Dean; Ritter; Dacoury Natche; Ebony Oshunrinde; Chantel Jeffries; Glenda Proby; Diulio Radici; Ugo Fusco	Travis Scott; Dean; Ritter; DJ Dahi; WondaGurl^{[a]}	5:39
6.	"Pray 4 Love" (featuring the Weeknd)	J. Webster; Abel Tesfaye; Carlo Montagnese; Dean; Ritter; Feeney	Travis Scott; The Weeknd; Illangelo; Ben Billions; Dean; Ritter^{[a]}	5:07
7.	"Nightcrawler" (featuring Swae Lee and Chief Keef)	J. Webster; Khalif Brown; Keith Cozart; Joshua Luellen; Bryan Simmons; Wayne; Dean; Ritter; Proby	Travis Scott; Southside; TM88; Metro Boomin; Dean; Ritter^{[a]}	5:21
8.	"Piss on Your Grave" (featuring Kanye West)	J. Webster; Kanye West; Ernest Brown; Darren King; Dean; Noah Goldstein; Cydel Young; Price	West; Charlie Heat; Travis Scott^{[b]}; King^{[b]}; Dean^{[b]}; Goldstein^{[b]}	2:46
9.	"Antidote"	J. Webster; Oshunrinde; Bryan Van Mierlo; Thomas Brenneck^{[e]}; David Guy^{[e]}; Leon Michels^{[e]}; Nicholas Movshon^{[e]}; Homer Steinweiss^{[e]}	Travis Scott; WondaGurl; Eestbound	4:22
10.	"Impossible"	J. Webster; Dean; Ritter	Travis Scott; Dean; Ritter	4:02
11.	"Maria I'm Drunk" (featuring Justin Bieber and Young Thug)	J. Webster; Justin Bieber; Jeffery Williams; Ritter; Feeney; Maneesh Bidaye	Travis Scott; Ritter; Frank Dukes; Maneesh; Dean^{[a]}	5:49
12.	"Flying High" (featuring Toro y Moi)	J. Webster; Chazwick Bundick; Pharrell Williams; Dean; Ritter; Mark Adams^{[f]}; Carter Bradley^{[f]}; Tim Dozier^{[f]}; Mark Hicks^{[f]}; Tom Lockett, Jr.^{[f]}; Floyd Miller^{[f]}; Danny Webster^{[f]}; Orion Wilhoite^{[f]}	P. Williams; Travis Scott^{[a]}; Dean^{[a]}; Ritter^{[a]}	3:28
13.	"I Can Tell"	J. Webster; Dean; Ritter; Trocon Roberts	Travis Scott; Dean; Ritter; FKi	3:55
14.	"Apple Pie"	J. Webster; Dean; Olubowale Akintimehin	Travis Scott; Dean; Terrace Martin^{[b]}; 1500 or Nothin'^{[b]}	3:39
Total length:				65:26

Deluxe edition (bonus tracks)
No.	Title	Writer(s)	Producer(s)	Length
15.	"Ok Alright" (featuring Schoolboy Q)	J. Webster; Quincy Hanley; Solána Rowe; Hill; Wayne; Dean; Uwaezuoke	Metro Boomin; Dean; Sonny Digital	6:57
16.	"Never Catch Me"	J. Webster; Uwaezuoke; Ritter; Oshunrinde; Proby	Sonny Digital; Ritter; WondaGurl^{[a]}	2:56
Total length:				75:19

Notes

- ^{^[a]} signifies an additional producer
- ^{^[b]} signifies a co-producer
- All tracks are stylized in lowercase on the physical back covers. For example, "Oh My Dis Side" is stylized as "oh my dis side".
- "Pornography", "Wasted", and "Apple Pie" feature narration by T.I.
- "Oh My Dis Side" features additional vocals by River Tiber
- "90210" features background vocals by Chantel Jeffries
- "Nightcrawler" in some old editions of physical copies, is named as "Night Call"
- "Flying High" features background vocals by Pharrell Williams
- "Ok Alright" features additional vocals by SZA and Kacy Hill
- "Never Catch Me" features additional vocals by Tinashe

Sample credits

- ^{^[c]} "Pornography" contains a sample from "Expectation", written by Torsten Olafsson, Finn Olafsson, Peter Mellin, and Glen Fisher, as performed by Ache.
- ^{^[d]} "Wasted" contains a sample from "Havin' Thangs '06", written by Michael Barnett, Will Barnett, Chad Butler, and George Clinton Jr., as performed by Pimp C featuring Big Mike; and a sample from "Let Your Life Be Free", written by T. Noporat, as performed by T. Zchien and the Johnny.
- ^{^[e]} "Antidote" contains a sample from "All I Need", written by Thomas Brenneck, David Guy, Leon Michels, Nicholas Movshon, and Homer Steinweiss, as performed by Lee Fields and the Expressions.
- ^{^[f]} "Flying High" contains a portion of "Slide", written by Mark Adams, Carter Bradley, Tim Dozier, Mark Hicks, Tom Lockett Jr., Floyd Miller, Danny Webster, and Orion Wilhoite, as performed by Slave.

== Personnel ==
Credits adapted from the album's liner notes.

Musicians

- Travis Scott – vocals
- Quavo – vocals (track 2)
- 2 Chainz – vocals (track 3)
- Future – vocals (track 3)
- Juicy J – vocals (track 4)
- The Weeknd – vocals (track 6)
- Swae Lee – vocals (track 7)
- Chief Keef – vocals (track 7)
- Kanye West – vocals (track 8)
- Justin Bieber – vocals (track 11)
- Young Thug – vocals (track 11)
- Toro y Moi – vocals (track 12)
- T.I. – narrator
- Mike Dean – guitar, keyboards
- Darren King – bass, drums, guitar
- Larrance Dopson – keyboards
- Jordan Lewis – guitar
- Terrace Martin – keyboards
- Allen Ritter – keyboards
- Zaytoven – keyboards

Additional personnel

- Kevin Amato – photography
- Chiki Uno – set design, art direction
- Corey Damon Black – art direction, design
- Chris Feldmann – art direction
- Dan Chung – design
- Anita Marisa Boriboon – creative direction
- Marc Kalman – creative direction

Technical personnel

- Travis Scott – executive production, production
- Mike Dean – executive production, production, additional production, assistant, drum programming, engineering, mixing, mastering
- Jason Geter – executive production
- Allen Ritter – production, additional production
- Metro Boomin – production (tracks 1, 3, 4, 7, 15)
- Frank Dukes – production (tracks 2, 11), additional production (track 4)
- WondaGurl – production (track 9), additional production (tracks 5, 16), programming
- Noah Goldstein – co-production (track 8), engineering, mixing, assistant
- The Weeknd – production (track 6)
- Illangelo – production (track 6), vocal engineering
- Ben Billions – production (track 6)
- Darren King – co-production (track 8)
- Kanye West – production (track 8)
- Charlie Heat – production (track 8)
- Eestbound – production (track 9), programming
- Pharrell Williams – production (track 12)
- Terrace Martin – co-production (track 14)
- 1500 or Nothin' – co-production (track 14)
- Zaytoven – additional production (track 3)
- FKi – production (track 13)
- Maneesh Bidaye – production (track 11)
- Apex Martin – additional drum programming (track 5)
- Jimmy Cash – engineering
- Thomas Cullison – engineering
- Blake Harden – engineering
- Stuart Innis – engineering, mixing assistance
- Jordan Lewis – engineering
- Ari Raskin – engineering
- Alex Tumay – engineering
- Finis White – engineering
- Seth Firkins – vocal engineering
- Kez Khou – mixing assistance
- Albert Chee – assistance

== Charts ==
=== Weekly charts ===
Chart performance for Rodeo
Chart (2015)	Peak position
Australian Albums (ARIA)	30
Austrian Albums (Ö3 Austria)	53
Belgian Albums (Ultratop Flanders)	50
Belgian Albums (Ultratop Wallonia)	52
Canadian Albums (Billboard)	5
Danish Albums (Hitlisten)	23
Dutch Albums (Album Top 100)	33
French Albums (SNEP)	54
German Albums (Offizielle Top 100)	60
New Zealand Albums (RMNZ)	22
Swiss Albums (Schweizer Hitparade)	14
UK Albums (Official Charts)	22
UK R&B Albums (Official Charts)	4
US Billboard 200	3
US Top R&B/Hip-Hop Albums (Billboard)	2

2024–2025 chart performance for Rodeo
Chart (2024–2025)	Peak position
Hungarian Physical Albums (MAHASZ)	24
Polish Albums (ZPAV)	24

=== Year-end charts ===
2015 year-end chart performance for Rodeo
Chart (2015)	Position
US Billboard 200	154
US Top R&B/Hip-Hop Albums (Billboard)	40

2016 year-end chart performance for Rodeo
Chart (2016)	Position
US Billboard 200	131
US Top R&B/Hip-Hop Albums (Billboard)	69

2024 year-end chart performance for Rodeo
Chart (2024)	Position
Icelandic Albums (Tónlistinn)	87
Polish Albums (ZPAV)	51

== Certifications ==
Certifications for Rodeo
Region	Certification	Certified units/sales
Brazil (Pro-Música Brasil)	Gold	20,000^{‡}
Canada (Music Canada)	Platinum	80,000^{‡}
Denmark (IFPI Danmark)	Platinum	20,000^{‡}
Italy (FIMI)	Gold	25,000^{‡}
Poland (ZPAV)	Platinum	20,000^{‡}
United Kingdom (BPI)	Gold	100,000^{‡}
United States (RIAA)	2× Platinum	2,000,000^{‡}
^{‡} Sales+streaming figures based on certification alone.
