= Kacy Hill =

American singer-songwriter and model (born 1994)

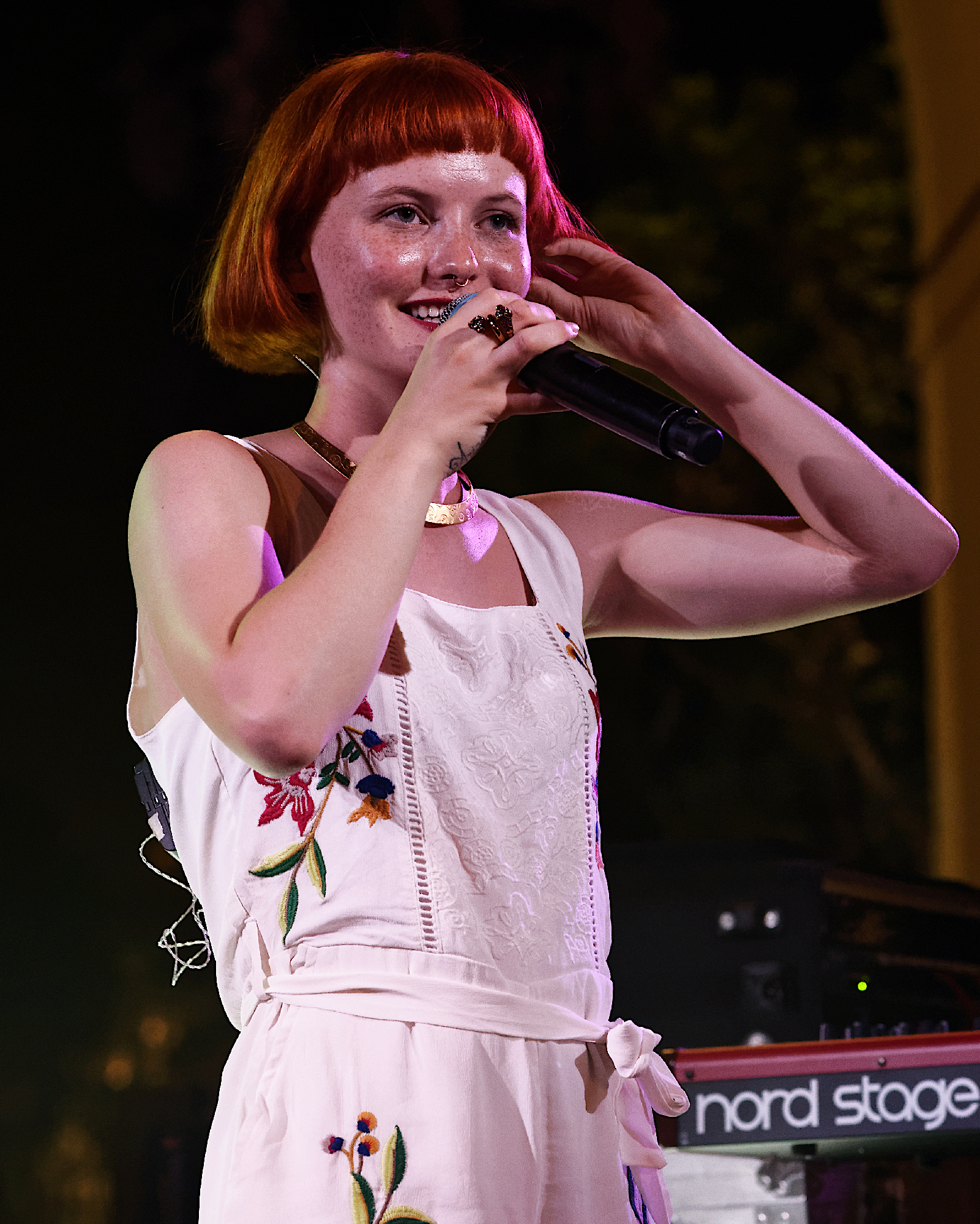
- Hill in 2016

Background information
- Born: Kacy Anne Hill; May 1, 1994 (age 32)
- Origin: Phoenix, Arizona, U.S.
- Genres: Indie pop; ambient pop; alternative R&B; trip hop; dream pop; electronica
- Occupations: Singer; songwriter; record producer; model
- Labels: Nettwerk (current); PMR; GOOD; Def Jam (former)
- Partner: Chlöe Howl (2026)
- Website: www.kacyhill.com

Kacy Anne Hill (born May 1, 1994) is an American singer-songwriter, record producer, and former model. She is best known for her guest appearance on Travis Scott's 2015 single "90210", which received quadruple platinum certification by the Recording Industry Association of America (RIAA).

She was born and raised in Phoenix, Arizona, and had previously worked as a model for American Apparel. In 2014, she self-released her debut single, "Experience". She later performed as a backup dancer on Kanye West's The Yeezus Tour, during which time West discovered her music and signed her to his record label, GOOD Music, "immediately".

Her debut extended play (EP), Bloo (2015), was followed by her debut album Like a Woman (2017) — both were critically praised, but failed to chart. Hill left GOOD Music in 2019, and self-released her second and third studio albums, Is It Selfish If We Talk About Me Again (2020) and Simple, Sweet, and Smiling (2021).

== Early life ==
Hill was raised in Phoenix, Arizona and attended Arizona School for the Arts. Hill has a younger sister, Emma. At an early age, she was influenced by music, playing the oboe and saxophone and singing in choir.

Hill began modelling at the age of 16 after being discovered by a wedding photographer. She moved to Los Angeles after high school to pursue a modelling career, which led to her becoming the face for American Apparel. She got into music when she met a director named Stephen Garnett, who later directed the video for her first non-album single release, "Experience". Regarding her modelling career, Hill stated that she never felt passionate about it. In an interview with New York, she was quoted as saying, "It wasn't something I really wanted to do; it was something that was there, so I went after it." Hill is openly bisexual and pansexual.

== Career ==
=== 2013–2019: Debut and Like a Woman ===
Hill was a backup dancer for Kanye West during his 2013–2014 The Yeezus Tour. She had released Experience, a non-album single at the beginning of the tour. The song was produced by Jaylien Wesley, also known as JAYLIEN. The video for the song was shot in ten minutes between her getting off a plane and going to a tour rehearsal. During the tour, West was provided with a copy of the song and he immediately signed Hill to his GOOD Music label after his show in Atlantic City.

Her song "Experience" received international media attention, with Digital Spy naming it a "track you need to hear" as well as The BoomBox naming Hill an artist to watch in 2015. Hill was also #6 on Dazed and Confused's Readers' 100 list and #29 on the Dazed 100 list in 2014. After the release of "Experience", Hill wrote songs that became part of her debut EP with GOOD Music. Entitled Bloo, the songs were said to be a collection of what Hill wanted to accomplish musically. The Express Tribune named her one of 10 new music artists you are bound to have on repeat. Additional accolades came from GQ who stated "Hill's barrelling towards the big time" and NY Magazine who stated she was "ethereal yet catchy" and "one to watch." Her first major feature was on the song "90210" on Travis Scott's Rodeo.

Hill finished recording her debut album in December 2016. In early May 2017, she released two singles, entitled "Hard to Love", produced by Stuart Price and Oskar Sikow, and "Like a Woman", produced by DJ Mustard, Terrace Martin and DJ Dodger Stadium (DJDS). Both singles were announced as the lead cuts from Hill's debut studio album, Like a Woman, released on 30 June 2017.

In August 2018, Hill independently released the single entitled, "Dinner". In May 2019, Hill announced that she had left GOOD Music on Twitter.

=== 2020–2022: Is It Selfish If We Talk About Me Again and Simple, Sweet, and Smiling ===
In July 2020, Hill released her second album Is It Selfish If We Talk About Me Again independently, featuring co-production from Hill herself, Francis and the Lights, and BJ Burton, as well as Cashmere Cat, and Hill's then-partner, Jim-E Stack, who inspired a lot of the album's tracks. According to Hill, the album was "Turned down by every label but it means the world to me." The album was met with favourable reviews from critics with music publication Pitchfork describing it as "Bright and open, built with sounds that move and breathe with the artist". The album has surpassed 15 million streams as of January 2022. She released a remix EP for the album in December 2020. Hill also contributed to Japanese-Australian singer-songwriter Joji's Nectar album in September 2020, co-writing "Like You Do".

Hill began teasing her third album via social media, working on the record alongside Jim-E Stack and John Carroll Kirby. She finished production on the album in July 2021. She released the lead single, "Seasons Bloom", on 27 August 2021, featuring production from Ariel Rechtshaid, Jim-E Stack, and Hill. Another single, titled "Easy Going" with production from Ethan Gruska, Jim-E Stack, and Hill was released on the 24th September. The album, titled Simple, Sweet, and Smiling, was announced for release on 15 October 2021 the same day. The album was met with positive reviews from critics, with Pitchfork describing it as "charming" and "imbued with a sense of lightness". Hill will also embark on her first headlining tour, the Simple, Sweet and Selfish Tour, in promotion of the album, as well as her previous album.

Hill supported Coldplay for their show at State Farm Stadium in May 2022, and also released her first self-produced track "If I Could Say" in June 2022, via web3-based music platform Sound. She also supported Conan Gray on his tour throughout September 2022.

=== 2023–present: Bug ===
Hill supported Suki Waterhouse for the Florida and Texas dates of her tour in October 2023. Hill signed with Nettwerk for the release of her next album, led by the release of the lead single "No One" in November 2023, followed by "Frog Rinse" in December.

In January 2024, Hill released "Listen to You" as the next single to her then-unannounced album. Bug was then announced in February 2024, alongside the single "You Know I Love You Still" and an American tour announcement. The 10-track album released 3 May 2024, and features collaborations with Nourished by Time and Donna Missal.

== Discography ==
=== Studio albums ===
Title	Album details
Like a Woman	Released: June 30, 2017; Label: GOOD Music, Def Jam; Format: LP, digital download, streaming
Is It Selfish If We Talk About Me Again	Released: July 10, 2020; Label: Self-released; Format: LP, digital download, streaming
Simple, Sweet, and Smiling	Released: October 15, 2021; Label: Self-released; Format: LP, digital download, streaming
Bug	Released: May 3, 2024; Label: Nettwerk; Format: LP, digital download, streaming

=== Extended plays ===
Title	Details
Bloo	Released: October 9, 2015; Label: GOOD Music, Def Jam, PMR; Format: Digital download, streaming
But Anyway, No Worries!	Released: August 27, 2025; Label: Nettwerk; Format: LP, Digital download, streaming

=== Singles ===
List of singles as lead artist, showing year released and album name
Title	Year	Album
"Experience"	2014	Non-album single
"Foreign Fields"	2015	Bloo
"Lion"	2016	Like a Woman
"Like a Woman"	2017	Like a Woman
"Hard to Love"	2017	Like a Woman
"Keep Me Sane"	2017	Like a Woman
"Dinner"	2018	Is It Selfish If We Talk About Me Again
"To Someone Else"	2019	Is It Selfish If We Talk About Me Again
"Much Higher"	2019	Is It Selfish If We Talk About Me Again
"I Believe in You" (featuring Francis and the Lights)	2020	Is It Selfish If We Talk About Me Again
"Porsche"	2020	Is It Selfish If We Talk About Me Again
"Unkind"	2020	Is It Selfish If We Talk About Me Again
"Everybody's Mother"	2020	Is It Selfish If We Talk About Me Again
"Seasons Bloom"	2021	Simple, Sweet, and Smiling
"Easy Going"	2021	Simple, Sweet, and Smiling
"No One"	2023	Bug
"Frog Rinse"	2023	Bug
"Listen to You"	2024	Bug
"You Know I Love You Still"	2024	Bug
"Damn"	2024	Bug
"Juliet"	2024	Non-album singles
"Time's Up" (with 6lack)	2025	Non-album singles
"When in Rome"	2025	But Anyway, No Worries!
"Please Don't Cry"	2025	But Anyway, No Worries!
"The Garden"	2025	But Anyway, No Worries!

=== Other certified song ===
Other certified song, showing year released and album name
Title	Year	Certifications	Album
"90210" (Travis Scott featuring Kacy Hill)	2015	RIAA: 3× Platinum; BPI: Gold	Rodeo

=== Guest appearances ===
List of guest appearances, with other performing artists, showing year released and album name
Title	Year	Other artist(s)	Album
"90210"	2015	Travis Scott	Rodeo
"Ok Alright"	2015	Travis Scott	Rodeo
"Releaser"	2016	Kid Cudi	Passion, Pain & Demon Slayin'
"Europa Pools"	2017	Cashmere Cat	9
"Fall Through"	2017	RKCB	RKCB-Sides
"I Heard (Part 2)"	2018	DJDS	Big Wave More Fire
"PDLIF"	2020	Bon Iver	Non-album single
"Can We"	2020	Jim-E Stack	EPHEMERA
"Jesus"	2021	Jimi Somewhere	Nothing Gold Can Stay
"Wake Up Tomorrow"	2021	Helado Negro	Far In
"Luz Mala"	2022	John Carroll Kirby	Cryptozoo (Original Motion Picture Soundtrack)
"Savage Cryptids"	2022	John Carroll Kirby	Cryptozoo (Original Motion Picture Soundtrack)
"Cryptozoo End Credits Theme"	2022	John Carroll Kirby	Cryptozoo (Original Motion Picture Soundtrack)
"Free Slime"	2022	IDK	Non-album single
"I Used To"	2022	isomonstrosity (Ellen Reid, Johan Lenox & Yuga Cohler)	isomonstrosity
"Close Enough"	2023	OTR	Be Quiet, They're Listening
"Long Drive"	2024	Half Alive	Persona
"Lie 95"	2025	Bartees Strange	Horror
"Short Story"	2025	Bon Iver	SABLE, fABLE
"It Ain't Easy"	2025	Johan Lenox	Full Speed Nowhere
"Sunset Hill"	2026	Nine Vicious	Emotions
