= Eddie Wizzy =

Ugandan dancer and choreographer turned musician

Eddie Wizzy Dances
- Born: Matte Edgar; 4 December 1994 (age 31); Kasese, Uganda
- Occupations: Entertainer, performer
- Years active: 2015–present

Matte Edgar (born 4 December 1994), better known by his stage name Eddie Wizzy, is a Ugandan dancer, artist and choreographer. He was nominated in the Afrimma Awards 2016 and 2017 in the African Best Dancer category.

== Education ==
Eddie studied at Jinja Army Primary School, Lubiri S.S.S, and Mityana.

== Music career ==
Wizzy started as a choreographer for Eddy Kenzo in 2015, featuring in different music videos, such as "Be happy", "Viva Africa", "Free Style Dance", "Disco Disco" by Eddy Kenzo, Sheeba's "By da way","Bukolomoni" by Cindy, "Katonda wa Raggae" by Ziza Bafana, and "Menya Egumba", featuring Ykee Benda. Wizzy recorded his first single, "Dance Vs Rap", featuring Feffe Bussi, in 2016.

== Discography ==
Songs
Song title	Year
"Dance Vs Rap"	2016
"Tabuka"	2017
"Selfie Dance"	2017
"Menya Egumba"	2017
"Kamitokosita"	2017
"Ozina Bulungi"	2019
"Tomala Budde"	2019
"Sheshe (tujja tujja )"	2024
"Fireworks"	2024
"Subaru"	2024
