= Bestman =

Bestman is a surname. Notable people with the surname include:

- Denise Bestman (born 2000), American singer-songwriter
- John G. Bestman (born 1939), Liberian politician
- Pewou Bestman (born 1975), Liberian footballer

== See also ==
- Walter Bestmann (1907–1958), German SS officer
- Best man (disambiguation)
