= 2026 FIFA World Cup final halftime show =

Event during the 2026 FIFA World Cup final

- Part of: 2026 FIFA World Cup final
- Date: July 19, 2026
- Location: East Rutherford, New Jersey
- Venue: MetLife Stadium
- Headliner: Madonna; Shakira; BTS; Justin Bieber
- Special guests: Burna Boy; Coldplay; Gustavo Dudamel; Electric Mayhem; Ghetto Kids; Brendan Hunt; Emmanuel Kelly; Bijan Mortazavi; The Muppets; New York Philharmonic; PS22 Chorus; Ronaldinho; Ronaldo; Simón Bolívar Symphony Orchestra; Jason Sudeikis
- Director: Hamish Hamilton
- Producer: FIFA; Global Citizen

The 2026 FIFA World Cup final halftime show was the halftime entertainment of the 2026 FIFA World Cup final, which took place on July 19, 2026, at MetLife Stadium in East Rutherford, New Jersey, outside New York City. The event marked the first ever halftime show for the FIFA World Cup. Directed by Hamish Hamilton, it was co-headlined by Madonna, Shakira, BTS and Justin Bieber, and featured several guests. It was produced by FIFA and Global Citizen, aiming to raise 100 million dollars for the FIFA Global Citizen Education Fund, which helps end extreme poverty and increase access to sports for children.

The show came under scrutiny amid concerns relating to the commercialization and Americanization of the sport. Criticism was specifically directed towards the show being in breach of the International Football Association Board's 15-minute interval rule.

== Background ==
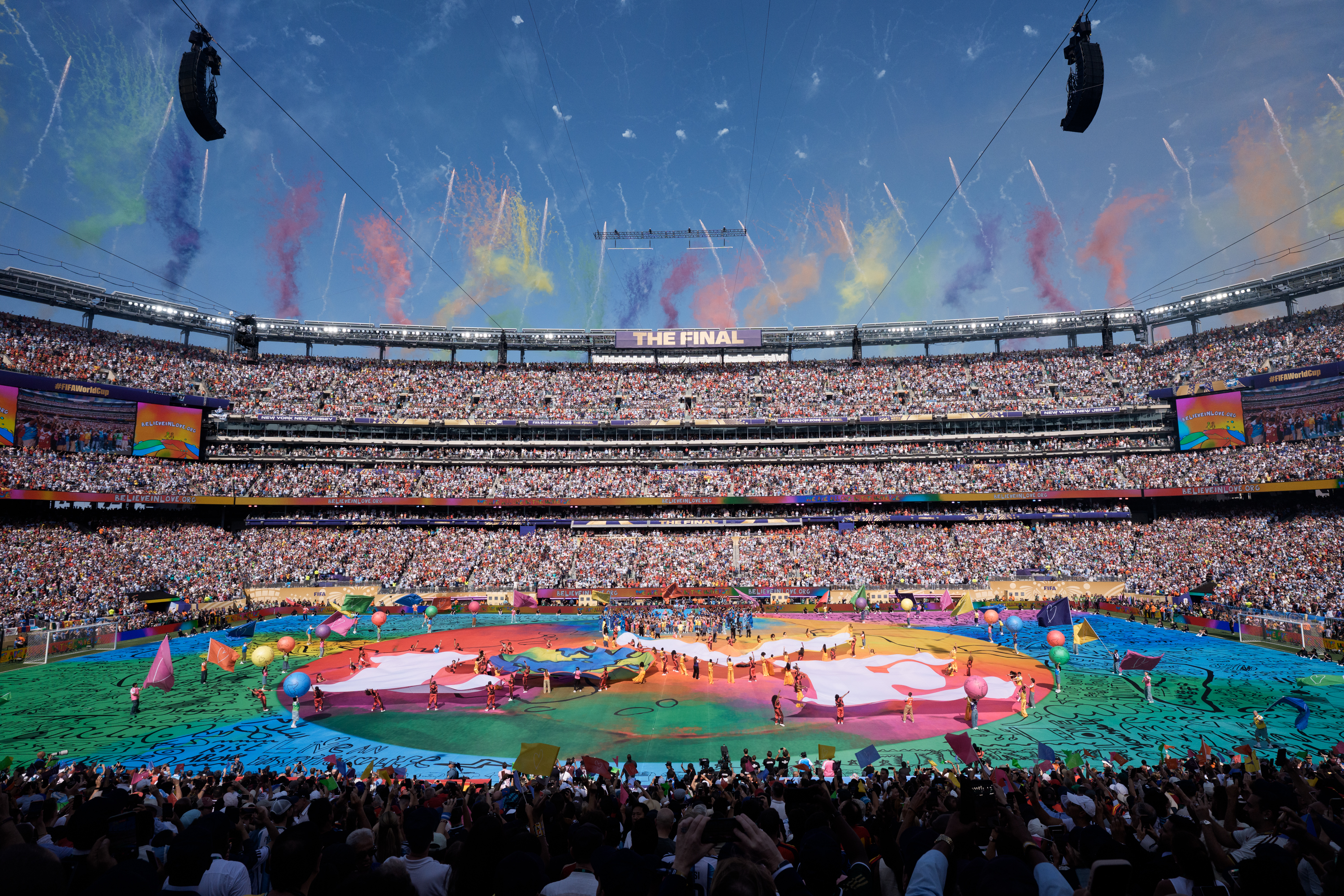
MetLife Stadium during the halftime show

Before the Super Bowl LVIII halftime show was headlined by American musician Usher in February 2024, Greg O'Keeffe of The Athletic published an article questioning if a similar performance would be ideal for soccer tournaments like the FIFA World Cup or the UEFA Champions League. Tim Crow, a marketing consultant who works with several brands which sponsor FIFA and UEFA, teased that organizations "have both pushed to extend half-time with the opportunities in mind." In 2024, Global Citizen co-founder Hugh Evans suggested to the FIFA president Gianni Infantino the idea of a halftime show during the 2025 FIFA Club World Cup final, seeing it as an "opportunity to see what we could learn through that process, but also kick off the FIFA Global Citizen Education Fund." The show was announced in June 2025, becoming the World Cup's first ever halftime show, produced in a cooperation with Global Citizen and the Global Citizen Festival curator, Chris Martin of Coldplay. Additionally, Evans and Martin discussed the idea of the halftime show during the 2026 FIFA World Cup with several producers, including Hamish Hamilton and Ben Winston.

On September 28, 2024, FIFA and Global Citizen announced their four-year agreement, with aim to help end extreme poverty and increase access to sports and quality education for children around the world. Simultaneously, they announced the co-production of the first ever halftime show for the FIFA World Cup final on the upcoming 2026 FIFA World Cup final at MetLife Stadium in East Rutherford, New Jersey. On March 5, 2025, FIFA announced that Coldplay would assist with picking the list of performers. Infantino commented: "This will be a historic moment for the FIFA World Cup and a show worthy of the world's greatest sporting events." Evans added that the show would be "a world first, a ground-breaking moment where sport, music and culture merge, celebrating football's unique power to bring us all together."

== Announcement ==
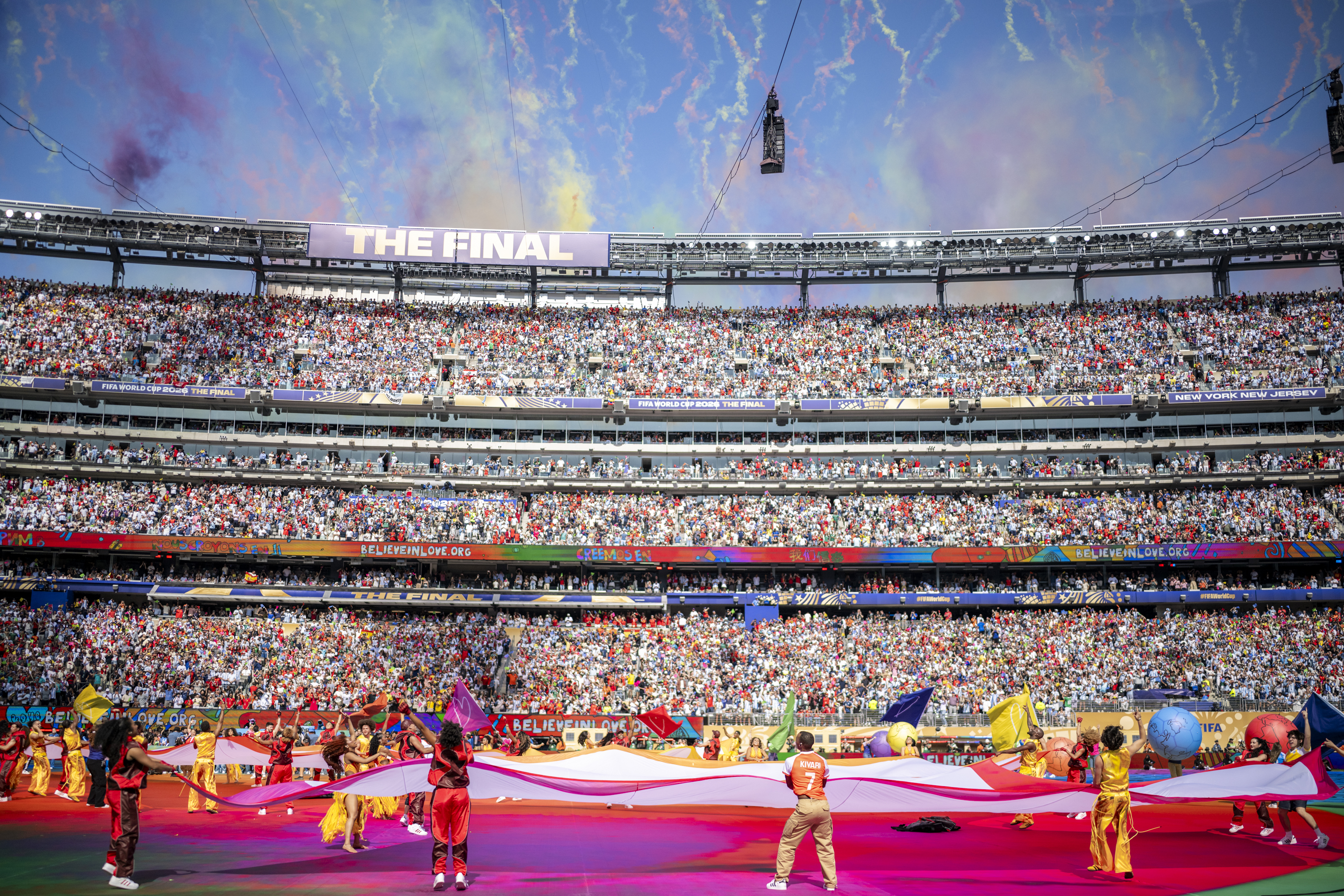
MetLife Stadium during the halftime show

On May 13, 2026, it was announced that American singer Madonna, Colombian singer Shakira and South Korean boy band BTS would headline the show, which would also feature the Muppets and Sesame Street characters. The announcement was made in a video shared on social media, in which Martin revealed the artists with the Muppets and Sesame Street characters. Live Nation Entertainment and Done+Dusted were announced as the show's co-producers. On the same day, the lineup was unveiled at the Global Citizen NOW Summit in New York City, attended by Infantino, Evans, footballer Kaká and Shakira. FIFA and Global Citizen announced that the show was aiming to raise 100 million dollars for the FIFA Global Citizen Education Fund. Global Citizen sources confirmed to The Athletic that Madonna, Shakira and BTS would not receive performance fees, as they were "donating their time to the social justice organization." In the press release, Madonna called the opportunity to support the FIFA Global Citizen Education Fund "deeply meaningful." Shakira commented: "I've spent my life doing two things – making songs and building schools. At the FIFA World Cup, those two paths come together."

On May 20, 2026, Shakira revealed on Instagram that the Ghetto Kids from Uganda were set to join her during the show. On July 8, 2026, FIFA announced that Canadian singer Justin Bieber would join as a headliner as well, while Burna Boy, Gustavo Dudamel, PS22 Chorus and Coldplay would be the guest performers. On July 14, 2026, Variety reported that the show would also include the New York Philharmonic and Simón Bolívar Symphony Orchestra from Venezuela, conducted by Gustavo Dudamel. Evans explained it as a tribute to the resilience of Venezuela following the 2026 earthquakes. Guy Carrington of Done+Dusted suggested that the show would also include surprises beyond what has been announced.

Madonna revealed that, being a soccer fan, she wanted to perform at the show, adding: "I've been bugging and harassing my manager for over a year about it." Shakira and Burna Boy recorded the tournament's official song, "Dai Dai", which was released on May 14, 2026. It was included on the official compilation album, Official FIFA World Cup 2026 Album, released on June 5, 2026. On June 11, 2026, Shakira and Burna Boy performed it on the 2026 FIFA World Cup opening ceremony in Mexico City. Shakira revealed that she was going to perform it on the final halftime show as well. On June 25, 2026, FIFA released a "Bonus Edition" of Official FIFA World Cup 2026 Album, featuring the "FIFA version" of "Read My Lips", recorded by Madonna and Feid for the former's fifteenth studio album Confessions II.

== Development ==
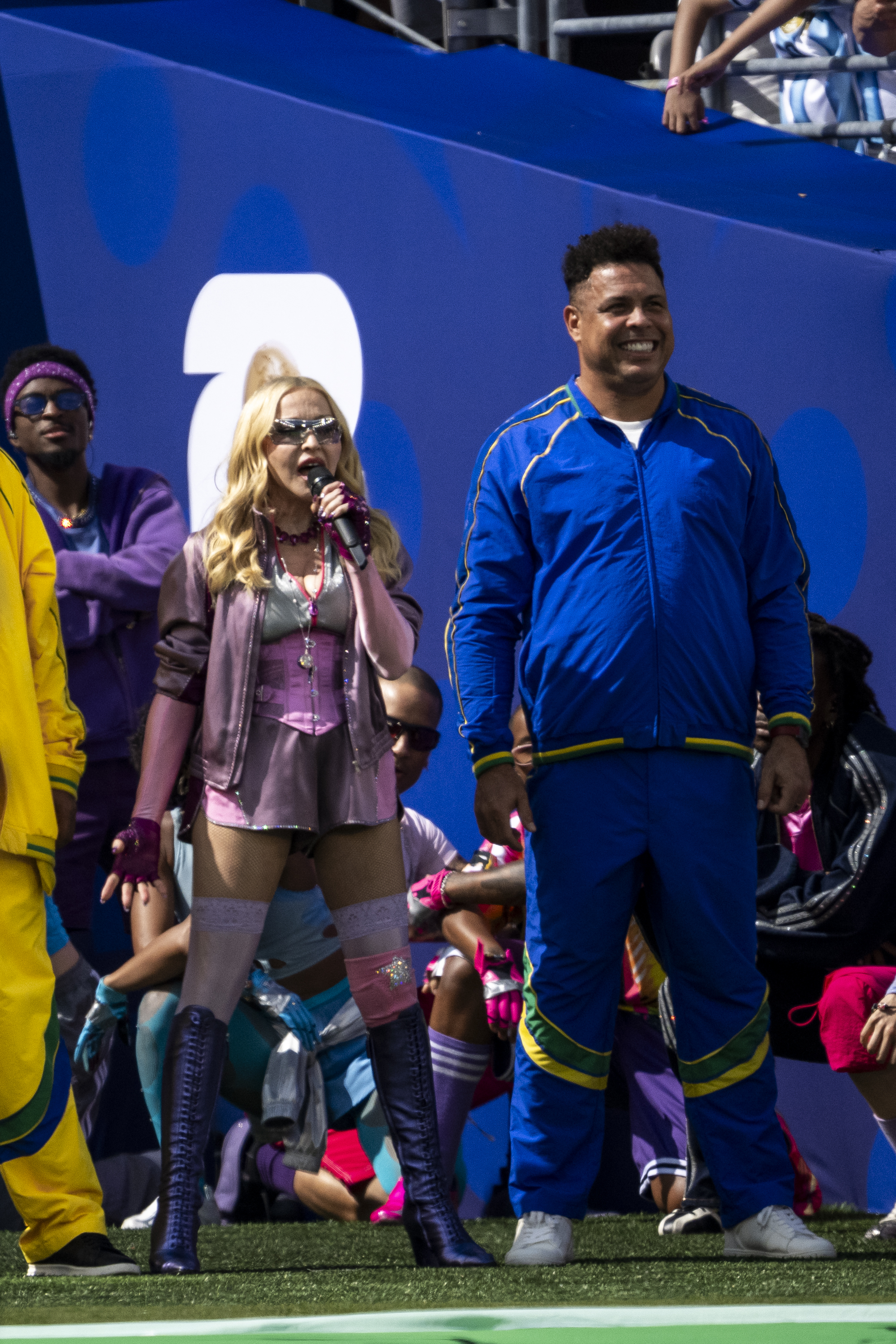
Madonna and Ronaldo during the show

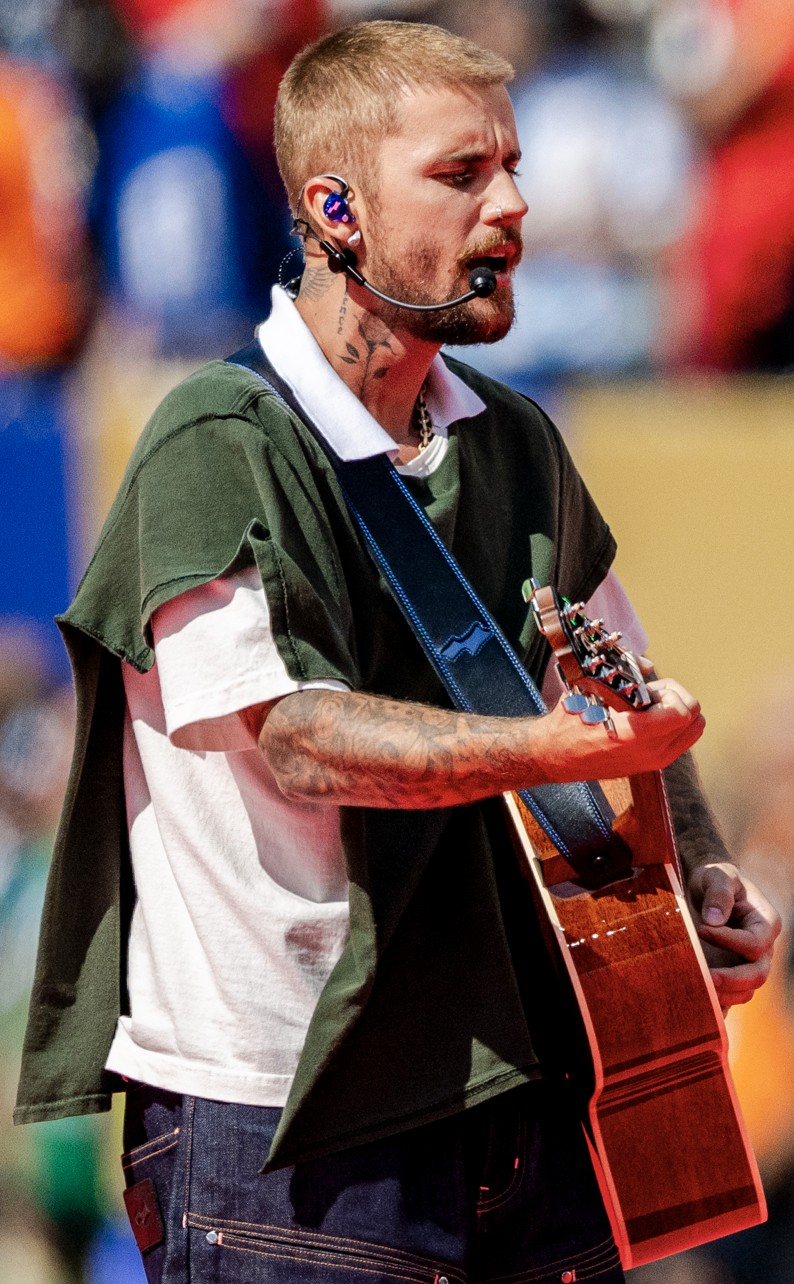
Justin Bieber during the show

The show was directed by Hamilton, who has previously directed each Super Bowl halftime show since 2010. The show was prepared for months in cooperation with all of the acts. Carrington described it as "tight, highly coordinated mega-mix". Wanting to make it representative of the world and create "a real moment of collaboration and unity", Martin engaged acts from different countries. In order to protect the grass and make no negative impact on the match itself, the producers planned to lay out a big cloth over the pitch and ordered all the participants to wear lightweight footwear. The performance area, including staging materials and camera dollies, was designed to move quickly, so that the production team could install and deinstall it in between 3 and 4 minutes. The production rehearsals took place in Miami, where the team tested laying out a big, protective pitch cover and examined the impact to the grass.

On May 14, 2026, BBC Sport reported that the show was planned to be 11 minutes long. The Atlantic reported that FIFA was planning to use the MetLife Stadium playing field for the show, contrary to the 2025 FIFA Club World Cup final halftime show, which was held on a stage high up in the stands to avoid any impact on the playing surface. Additionally, it reported that the interval for the show would run significantly beyond soccer's regulations of 15 minutes, codified by the International Football Association Board. On July 14, 2026, BBC Sport reported that the halftime is expected to last between 20 and 25 minutes and the 11-minute show is planned to start after the normal 15-minute break. The Atlantic added that FIFA was targeting the halftime to last no longer than 20 minutes. On July 17, 2026, broadcasters were informed by FIFA that the halftime would last 18 minutes, including 7-minute installation of the stage and 11-minute show. Ultimately, the halftime lasted 27 minutes and 22 seconds.

For Shakira, Fausto Puglisi of Roberto Cavalli designed a two-piece set featuring a crisscross neckline, side cutouts and fringe satin chiffon strips, paired with a molded skirt and hand-embellished with more than 200,000 Swarovski crystals. The outfit took two weeks to create, including more than 120 hours to embroider. Shakira invited Énola Bédard to join her for the performance after seeing her video of dancing to "Dai Dai" in social media.

Madonna wore an outfit designed by Saint Laurent, consting of bleached purple sporty jacket, corset, coordinating short-shorts with lace lilac stockings and stompy boots. The look was inspired by classic soccer warm-up kits. Her stylist Rita Melssen conceptualized it as a "homage to Madonna's signature athleisure style" and channeled her old paparazzi photos from travels and workouts. The outfit was supplemented with gloves, necklaces and earrings covered in Swarovski crystals, as well as a bespoke crystal referee.

== Synopsis ==
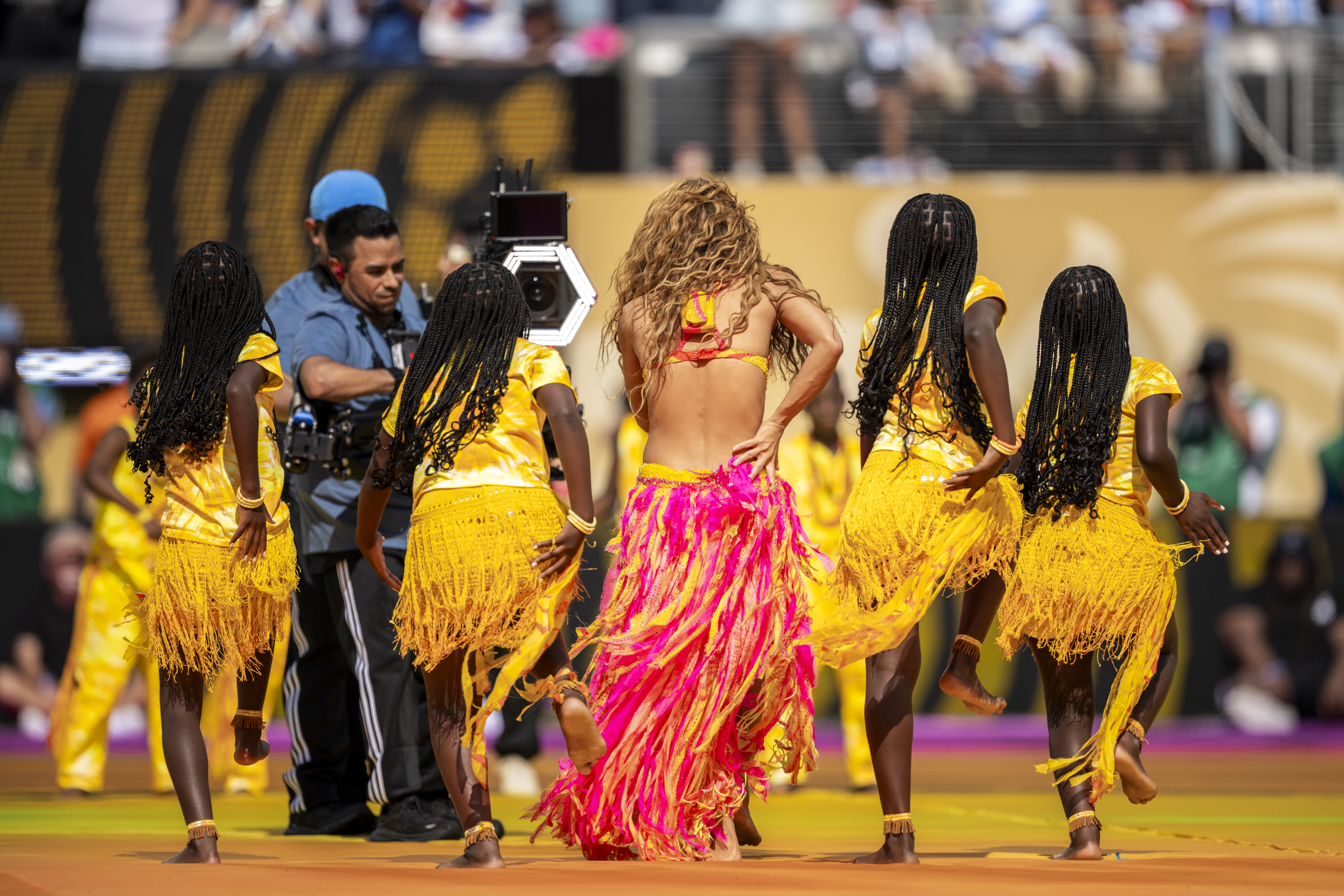
Shakira and the Ghetto Kids performing "Dai Dai" during the show

The show was divided into chapters, with each performance lasting about 1 minute and 45 seconds. It started with a pre-recorded footage of Madonna performing "Music" in a set stylized as the stadium's tunnels. She started singing in a pink setup with the DJ Stuart Price, surrounded by dancers and skaters. Subsequently, she sang in a jeep with a "Maestro" license plate, sitting next to Brazilian former soccer players Ronaldo and Ronaldinho. Towards the end of the song, they went out to the stadium pitch. Gustavo Dudamel conducted a rendition of The White Stripes' "Seven Nation Army", played by New York Philharmonic, Simón Bolívar Symphony Orchestra, violonist Bijan Mortazavi and the Muppets' rock group The Electric Mayhem, followed by a Viking Row. BTS performed "Dynamite", dressed in red and black looks and motorcycle-style leather jackets. Jason Sudeikis and Brendan Hunt appeared on a pitch as their characters from television series Ted Lasso, Ted Lasso and Willis Beard, encouraging Justin Bieber before his performance. He gave a minimalistic rendition of "Everything Hallelujah", singing and playing an acoustic guitar. He was followed by a performance of "Dai Dai" by Shakira in a hula-styled outfit and Burna Boy, accompanied by the Ghetto Kids in from Uganda in yellow costumes and female dancers. For the finale, the group of schoolchildren in rainbow shirts, PS22 Chorus, performed "We Dance", joined by Coldplay, the Muppets, Sesame Street characters and Emmanuel Kelly. Dancers held colorful balls and the stadium audience waved the colorful flags, preinstalled in their seats. As the camera pulled out, the stage revealed the word "LOVE", with the "O" rendered as a globe.

== Reception ==
=== Controversy ===
The show's announcement sparked controversies among the media and soccer community, which deemed to represent an Americanization and commercialization of soccer. Ben Church of CNN commented that the soccer "purists" saw it as "something so far removed from the origins of the sport that it feels delirious and almost unholy." There have also been concerns about violating the International Football Association Board rule that an interval of match cannot exceed 15 minutes and it may be altered only with the referee's permission, because a longer interval may influence the players' routine and recovery. Halftime shows for the 2024 Copa América final and 2025 FIFA Club World Cup final each reached 24 minutes.

Crow commented: "Football is different from NFL which has more frequent stoppages and offensive and defensive teams. In football, there would be questions over how you keep the players warm and tuned up for 30 minutes." He also added that sports in the United States, including the Super Bowl, are built "on a commercial model, as a vehicle to sell TV advertising," while in Europe "there could still be a lower audience appetite and tolerance for the amount of ads that the Super Bowl half-time show contains." Sports journalist Gabriele Marcotti commented: "Professional footballers are conditioned to 15-minute breaks. They're athletes. Mess with their routine and they'll get cold, or hot, or stiff or whatever. It's not worth the risk of screwing with this."

Conversely, Crow commented that the show was "just another culture clash in a tournament full to the brim with just that." He felt that for Americans "entertainment and sports have always gone hand in hand," asking: "why shouldn't a host nation stamp its own identity on matches played on its home turf?". He remarked on the multiple collaborations between FIFA and Shakira over the years and added: "We then have BTS, the K-pop megaband that's mobilized a movement and Madonna who, well, is just Madonna – who doesn't love a bit of 'Like a Prayer'?" Marcotti opined that "football has to evolve, and maybe this is a necessary step." He stated that FIFA was a commercial corporation and the national associations "vote Gianni Infantino into power largely on the basis that he'll continue generating revenue and redistributing it around the world."

The Guardian reported that several World Cup broadcasters reached out to FIFA for clarity on the length of the show, but did not receive answers. The show caused problems especially for commercial broadcasters because their advertising teams had inventory to sell. In May 2026, media reported that the BBC rejected to broadcast the show during the main television coverage, with intention to having pundits analyze the opening 45 minutes, and instead show it only on their digital services. ITV was reported to follow with the same decision. However, on July 15, 2026, it was reported that both broadcasters decided to air the show. TRT chose not to air the halftime show, instead broadcasting commercials and a first-half analysis by its studio pundits.

During the BBC broadcast of the match, the former English soccer player Wayne Rooney said: "I like a lot of them artists but I thought it was crap." Afterwards, Henry Bushnell of The New York Times opined that the show, along with other entertainment elements of the final match, felt "like a parody of the American sporting experience" with "no story being told, nothing authentic".

=== Critical response ===
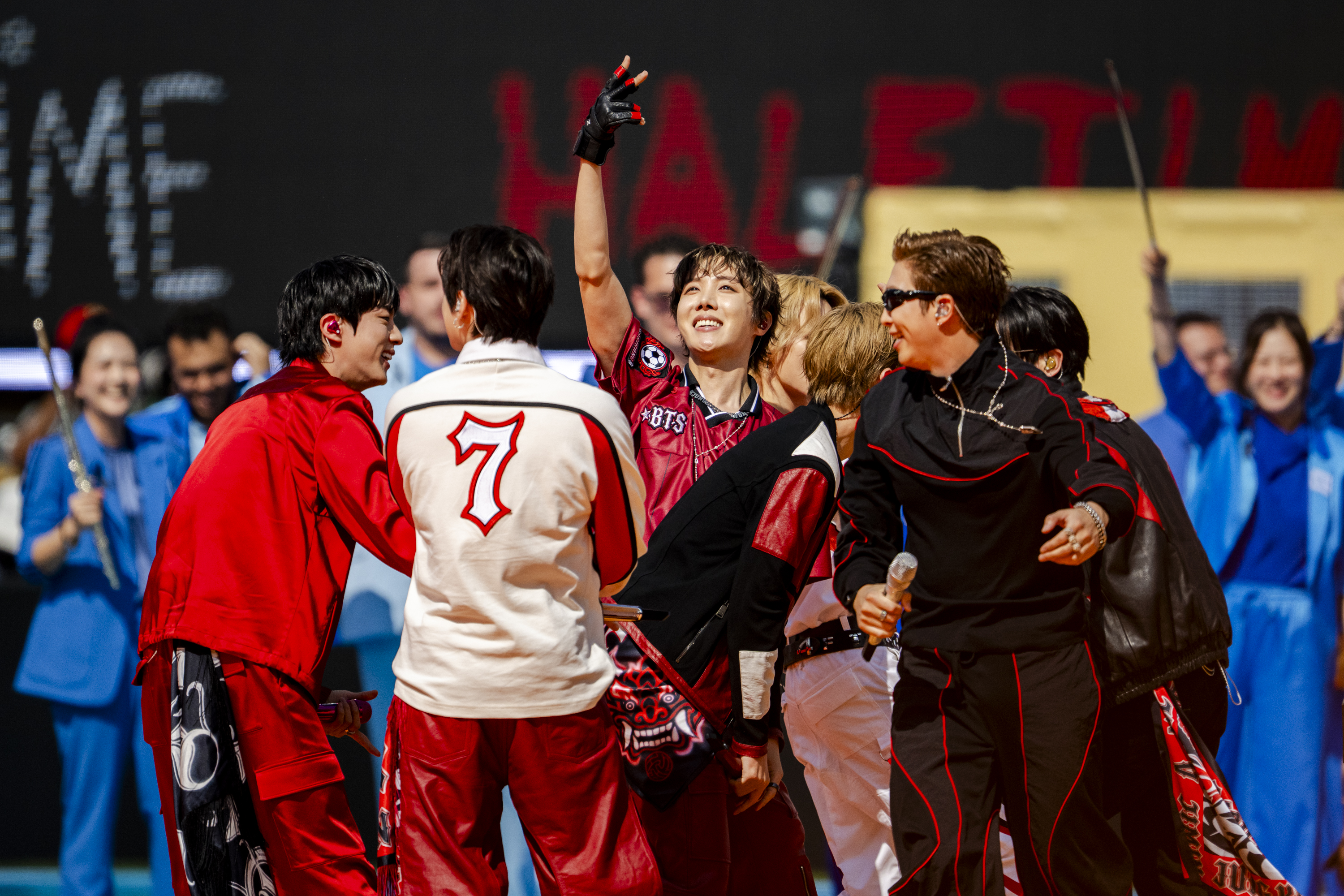
BTS during the show

The Daily Telegraph writer Neil McCormick declared that "Rather than going for the kind of spectacular blockbuster staging often seen at sporting events such as the American football Super Bowl, the World Cup rather surprisingly opted to keep things charming, friendly and intimate". He criticized Madonna's pre-recorded introduction, but was positive towards the other headliners. Lindsay Zoladz from The New York Times argued that the show was "impeccably choreographed" but also "thematically jumbled", remarking on its episodic format and inoffensive messaging. The Athletic's Tom Spiers called it "slick, surreal and entirely unnecessary". Consequence's Paolo Ragusa and Alex Young opined that the event "was chaotic, occasionally messy, and burdened by transitions, particularly the tonal whiplash between BTS and Bieber. Still, there were flashes of genuine fun [...] It may not have been especially coherent, especially in comparison to the NFL's Super Bowl spectacle, but it certainly lived up to its billing as a halftime show for the biggest sporting event in the world". Saeed Saeed of The National agreed with the sentiment, claiming the performance had "the professionalism and slickness the tournament deserved". The Guardian's Alexis Petridis called the show a "comparative triumph" comparing to the closing ceremony, feeling that while it "wasn't sufficiently head-spinning to convince the viewer it should be a regular occurrence at every World Cup final, it worked well enough to justify its existence at least this time".

Judy Berman from Time magazine criticized the show's number of performers as "overstuffed", alongside its brief length and lack of memorable highlights. Describing it as a "nonspecific, studiously apolitical agenda of uplift", Berman unfavorably compared the show to Bad Bunny's performance at the Super Bowl LX halftime show. Journalists including Melissa Ruggieri of USA Today and Chris Willman of Variety also pointed out the show's briefness in proportion to the number of performers. ESPN's Matt Morlidge and Tom Masters rated each performer individually. Madonna received the highest score at nine out of 10 stars, with her set being dubbed "a fever dream, but one we thoroughly enjoyed". They gave Justin Bieber the lowest grade at six out of 10, feeling like "we could have got a bit more out of a man we know can perform on the big stage". Shania Russell of Entertainment Weekly complimented individual performances, but opined that "none of them got to showcase their best work in the fleeting seconds that they did have".

== Commercial impact ==
According to Luminate, streams of the performed songs in the United States increased on the day after the show: Justin Bieber's "Everything Hallelujah" by 34%, Shakira's and Burna Boy's "Dai Dai" by 25%, BTS' "Dynamite" by 13% and Madonna's "Music" by 6%. Global streams of these songs increased by 110%, 24%, 43% and 66%, respectively, between two days before the final (July 17–18) and next two days (July 19–20). Luminate noted that, unlike what usually happens after the Super Bowl halftime show, artists only saw considerable jumps in the songs they performed as opposed to their full catalogs.

== Set list ==
Credits adapted from The Hollywood Reporter.

1. "Music" (with elements of "Disco Inferno" and "Danceteria") – Madonna
2. "Seven Nation Army" – Gustavo Dudamel, New York Philharmonic, Simón Bolívar Symphony Orchestra, Bijan Mortazavi and the Electric Mayhem
3. "Dynamite" – BTS
4. "Everything Hallelujah" – Justin Bieber
5. "Dai Dai" – Shakira, Burna Boy and the Ghetto Kids
6. "We Dance" – Coldplay, The Muppets, Sesame Street characters, Emmanuel Kelly and PS22 Chorus

== See also ==
- 2026 FIFA World Cup opening ceremonies
