= Ghetto Kids =

Dance group from Uganda

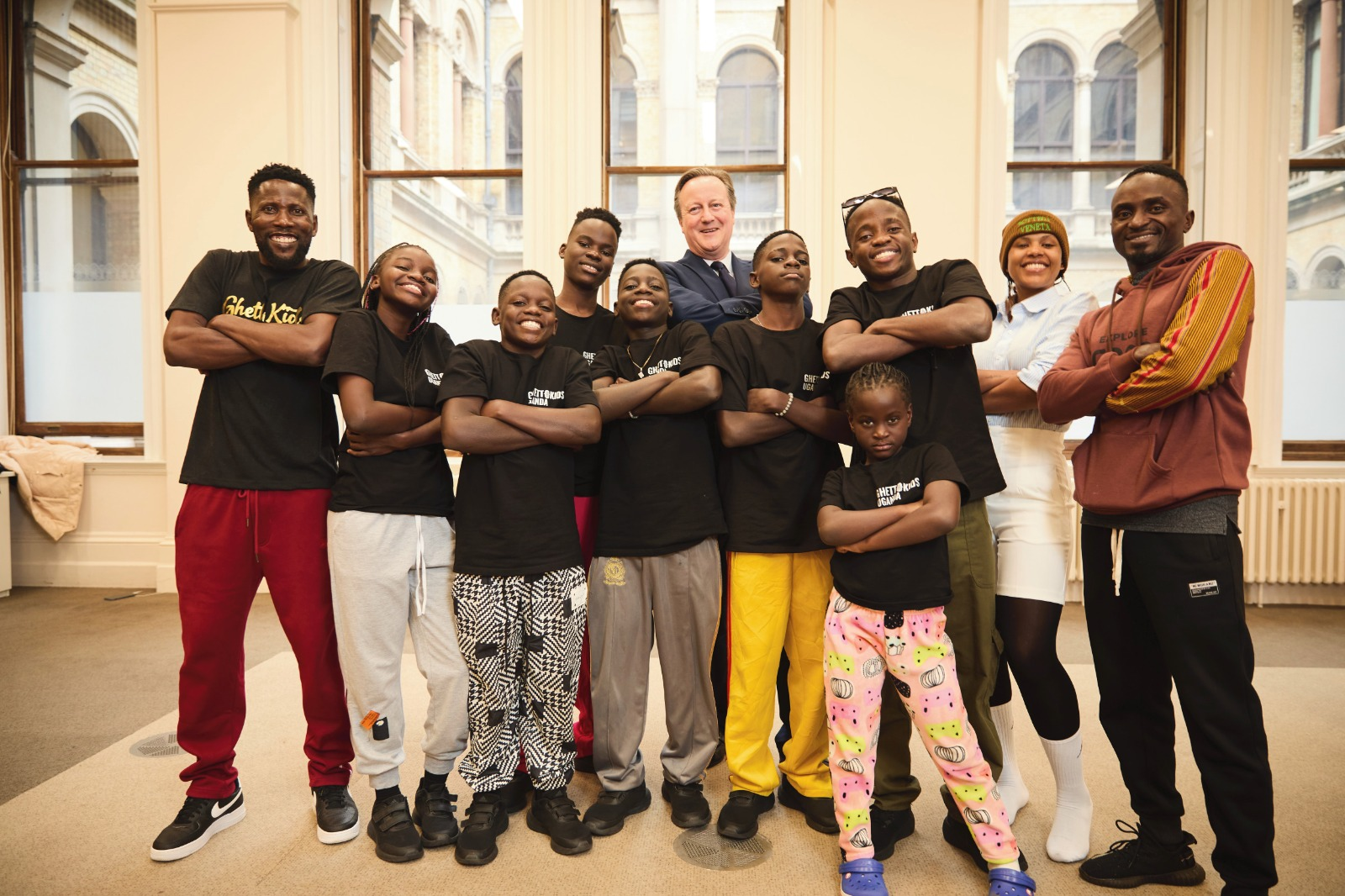
Photo of the Ghetto Kids meeting the British Foreign Secretary.

The Ghetto Kids – formerly Triplets Ghetto Kids – are a dance/music group founded in 2014 by Dauda Kavuma composed of children from the Katwe slums in Kampala, Uganda. They have appeared on major platforms across the world – featuring in French Montana's "Unforgettable" video and performing at multiple World Cups, including 2022 and 2026, with the latter being performed with Colombian singer Shakira.

== History ==
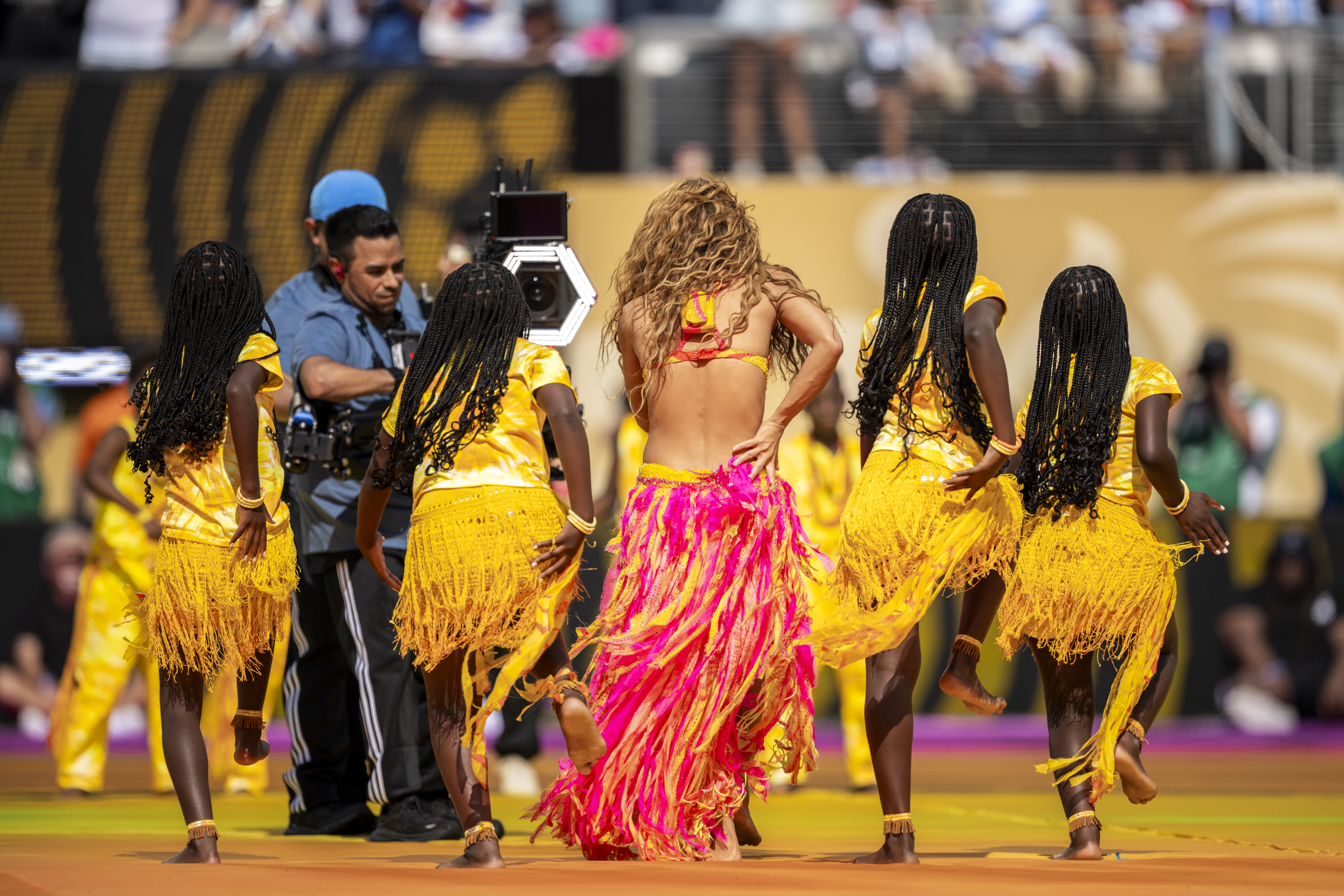
The Ghetto Kids performing Dai Dai with Shakira at the 2026 FIFA World Cup final halftime show in New Jersey

In 2014, a video of Alex, Fred, Bachir, Patricia and Isaac dancing to Eddy Kenzo's "Sitya Loss" music went viral, accumulating over 8 million views on YouTube and other social networks. Kenzo later stated "I did not know about this clip until a friend told me about it.“ He later asked them to collaborate in the song's official video released in September that same year, marking the beginning of the Ghetto Kids which allowed them to return to school and founder Daouda Kavuma to buy equipment to develop the group. He composes and produces several pieces of music for the group that toured Africa and the UK in the following months.

On November 30, 2015, 14-year-old Alex died as a result of a bicycle accident; despite their loss, Ghetto Kids have continued their performances, touring throughout Africa and beyond. The group have provoked the admiration of American artists P. Diddy and Nicki Minaj, and in 2017, the group featured in the clip of French Montana's Unforgettable, launching their success in the United States.

In January 2023, the Ghetto Kids travelled to France to perform at half-time during football club Paris Saint-Germain's home game against Reims at the Parc des Princes. They also met PSG players such as Kylian Mbappé prior to the match.

In April 2023, Ghetto Kids appeared on Britain's Got Talent where new judge Bruno Tonioli, not knowing the rules of the show, took matters into his own hands and gave them the golden buzzer mid-performance, becoming the first ever contestants to receive this mid-performance in Got Talent history. The group won the third semi-final with 39.7% of the public vote, and finished sixth place in the final, receiving 10.1% of the public vote, failing to secure a spot in the final 3.

On 19 July 2026, Ghetto Kids performed during the 2026 FIFA World Cup final halftime show with Colombian singer Shakira, located at the MetLife Stadium in East Rutherford, New Jersey.

== Awards and nominations ==
Year	Award	Category	Result
2021	Nickelodeon Kids' Choice Awards	Favorite African Social Media Star	Nominated
—	African Muzik Magazine Awards (AFRIMMA)	Best Dance Group	Won
—	African Entertainment Awards USA (AEAUSA)	Best Dance Group	Won

== Collaborations ==
- 2014: "Sitya Loss" - Eddy Kenzo (Music video)
- 2015: "Jambole" - Eddy Kenzo (Music video)
- 2017: French Montana - "Unforgettable" (Music video)
- 2022: "ODG" - Eltee Skhillz (Music video)
- 2022: "Tunakupenda" - Triplets Ghetto Kids ft. Eltee Skhillz (Music video)
- 2026: "Dai Dai" - Shakira and Burna Boy (Music Video)
