= Mehran Matin =

Iranian artist and music producer (born 1996)

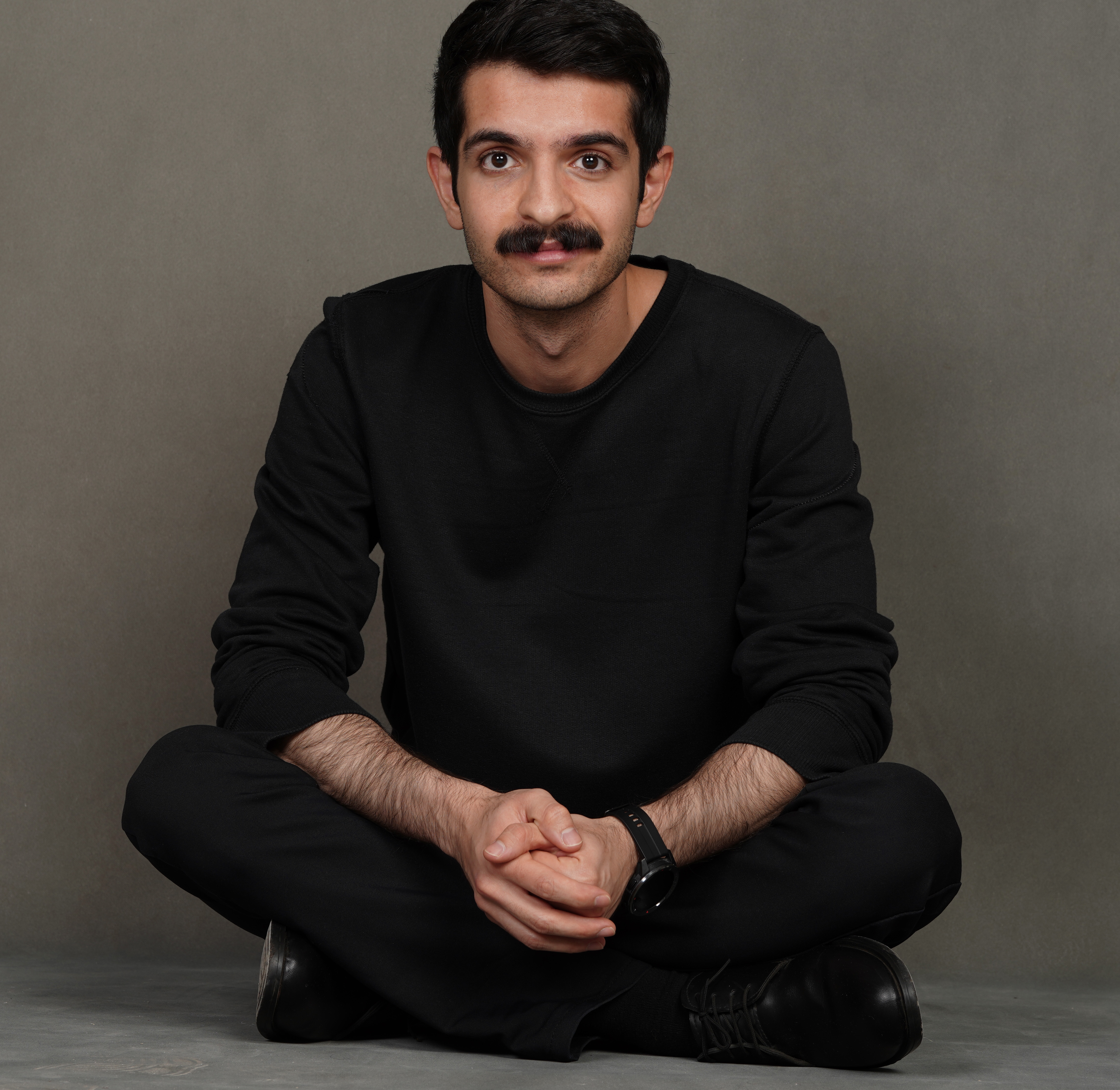
- Matin in 2024

Background information
- Born: Mehran Matin; March 25, 1996 (age 29); Sirjan, Kerman Province, iran
- Genres: Global, electronic, classical crossover
- Occupations: Musician, music producer, multi-instrumentalist, composer
- Instruments: Piano, violin, kamancheh
- Years active: 2010s–present

Mehran Matin (Persian: مهران متین) is an Iranian artist, music producer and multi-instrumentalist. He is best known for his GRAMMY-nominated collaboration "Hope & Love" with Ugandan artist Eddy Kenzo.

== Early life and education ==
Matin was born in Sirjan, Kerman Province, Iran, on 25 March 1996 and spent his youth in that city. He began studying violin and later piano at young ages and later developed an interest in the kamancheh and other world instruments. By his teenage years, he was already composing and producing original works.

== Music career ==
Matin performed in concerts and recitals in Iran and other parts of the world as a pianist and violinist early in his career.

In 2022, he released Seesaw on the label Fading Sound Records. To date, he has released an extensive catalog of music and has contributed to more than 100 internationally released recordings as a producer, sound engineer, and instrumentalist.

In addition to his work as an artist and producer, Matin is also a sound engineer who has mixed and mastered numerous songs and albums for artists across different genres.

== Style and influences ==
Commentary in interviews describes Matin's work as combining Iranian timbres (such as the kamancheh) with electronic production and orchestral textures, aimed at cross-cultural dialogue.

== Recognition and nominations ==
Mehran Matin has been nominated for a GRAMMY Award in the category Best African Music Performance for his collaborative track "Hope & Love" with Eddy Kenzo.
