= Denise Bestman =

American vocalist (born 2000)

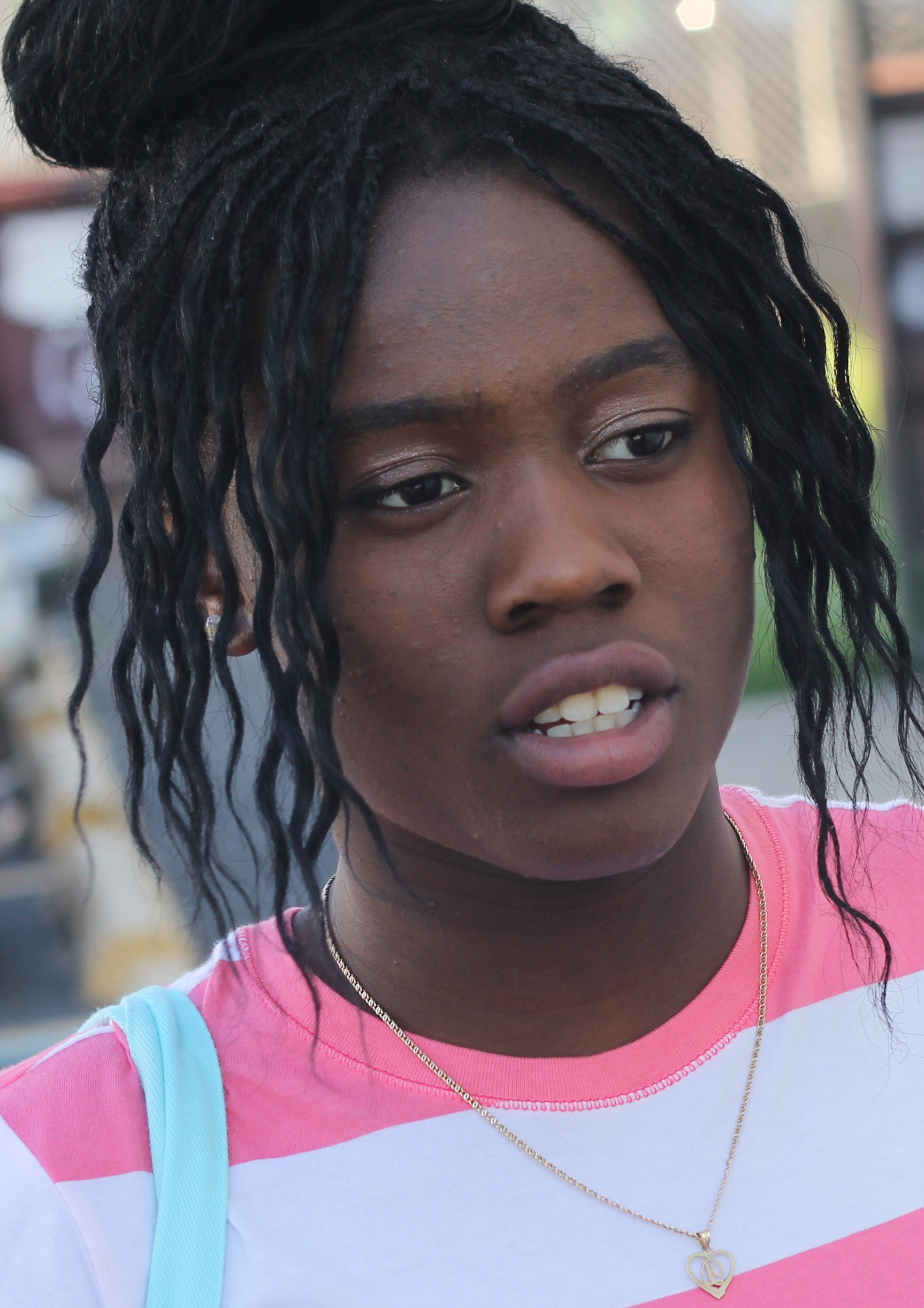
- Denise Bestman, in 2014

Background information
- Born: Denise Bestman; July 11, 2000 (age 26); Staten Island, New York
- Genres: Pop; Soul
- Occupation: Singer
- Instrument: Vocals
- Years active: 2010–present
- Labels: PurpleThrone Corporation; NY Perks Entertainment; NY Perks Music
- Website: www.denisebestman.com www.purplethrone.com

Denise Bestman (born July 11, 2000) is an American singer-songwriter from Staten Island, New York.

== Early life ==
Bestman was born in Staten Island to parents who immigrated from Liberia, West Africa. Her father returned to Liberia in 2010. Bestman's mother is Dextina Lincoln, a single parent.

Singing is a family tradition for Bestman as she credits her singing talent to her great-grandmother and passed through her mothers line to her.

In 4th Grade she auditioned for the renowned PS22 Chorus which is part of the Public School 22 in Graniteville, Staten Island, New York in 2010.

Bestman procured the lead role of the PS22 Chorus. She performed improvised sessions, which led to her writing her own original songs. The school's chorus received an invitation to perform the closing number of "Over The Rainbow" at the 83rd Academy Awards on February 27, 2011. The Chorus went on to perform with Katy Perry on The Oprah Winfrey Show post Oscar show at the Kodak Theatre on February 28, 2011.

== Career ==
It was PS22 Chorus' rendition of Adele's, "Rolling in the Deep," with Bestman as lead singer that caught the attention of the Target Corporation. She gained more attention for the 54th Annual Grammy Award night Target ad where she sang Adele's "Rolling in the Deep" for its 40 million viewers.

=== Target ad ===
Bestman was spotted by The Target Corporation representatives after one of her YouTube videos received more than two million hits. When representatives couldn't get in touch with her mother, they contacted PS22 choral director, Gregg Breinberg. The 30-second Target ad features Denise standing on a bus listening to her iPod singing as her classmates add the harmonies and wave their hands in time to the music. Adele took home six Grammy Awards for her album, 21, which escalated the popularity of Denise Bestman's cover song. Adele was so impressed with Denise's rendition that she pinned a link to Denise's performance on her official website. Aretha Franklin also said she saw the ad. The then 11-year-old vocalist was invited to perform on BET's 106 & Park with Terrence J & Rocsi where she debuted her original composition "Lying Man".

Bestman was interviewed by Piers Morgan who said he was impressed by her voice and that her career was just beginning as "a diva in the making".

=== Target + Feed ===
On June 19, 2013, "Target VIP" + Lauren Bush Lauren Feed USA commissioned a special performance by Bestman and American singer and songwriter, Phillip LaDon Phillips Jr. who won the eleventh season of American Idol on May 23, 2012. The partnership's mission was to make it easy for consumers to make a positive impact on hunger in the U.S. with every product displaying the number of meals donated with purchase. This event launched the retailer's largest socially conscious design collaboration. Glee Star Lea Michele hosted the event.

=== Solo work ===
Bestman's voice has been described as "seasoned raspy," "sophisticated," "extraordinary," "soothing," and "intriguing." On February 18, 2015, Bestman debuted her Single "HIDDEN" off the Gallery of Fools EP. This EP was received well when she performed her songs at "The Hunger Project" fall annual Gala on October 17, 2015. On August 28, 2017, her single "Echoes of Love" deputed on Bree Noble's Women of Substance radio that received much acclaim.

=== Blick.ch ===
On February 23, 2015, Bestman's single "Echoes of Love" was featured in a Mercedes CLS newspaper editorial video on the largest Web Portal in Switzerland, Blick.ch On November 11, 2015, her single "Gallery of Fools" was featured in a Porsche 911 newspaper editorial video on the largest Web Portal in Switzerland, Blick.ch

=== PurpleThrone Corporation ===
Bestman signed an independent management and production company with C.E.O Aziz M. Bey and his company PurpleThrone in 2011.

== Personal life ==
Bestman sings everywhere, citing that when she reads she sings the words of a book to herself.

== Discography ==
=== Releases ===
- 2014: Hidden
- 2015: Gallery of Fools

== Videos ==
- 2015: Denise Bestman, "Gallery of Fools," produced by Aziz M. Bey and Denise Bestman, directed by Joseph Ciccarella (JC)/ Quiet. All. Around.

== See also ==
- Soul Music
- Pop Music
- Blues Music
- R&B
- Gospel
