= 2026 FIFA World Cup broadcasting rights =

The 2026 FIFA World Cup was an international football tournament organized by FIFA, with an expansion over the previous competition from 32 to 48 teams. The broadcasting rights were sold directly by FIFA to national and trans-national broadcasters.

== Host broadcaster ==
Host Broadcast Services served as the tournament's host broadcaster. The International Broadcast Centre was established in the Kay Bailey Hutchison Convention Center in Dallas, Texas, U.S.

== Broadcast in host countries ==
On February 12, 2015, FIFA renewed the U.S. and Canadian broadcasting rights contracts for Fox (U.S. English), Telemundo Deportes (U.S. Spanish), and Bell Media (Canada) to cover 2026, without accepting any other bids. A report in The New York Times asserted that this extension was intended as compensation for the rescheduling of the 2022 World Cup to November–December rather than its traditional June–July scheduling, as it created considerable conflicts with major professional sports leagues that are usually in their offseasons during the World Cup.

In the United States, 69 matches aired on Fox and the remainder on FS1. Fox's coverage streamed on its subscription service Fox One, Fox Sports struck a partnership with Cosm to show 40 matches in their three current locations at time, including the Mexico vs. South Africa opening match, all USMNT matches, and the final.In Spanish, 92 fixtures aired on Telemundo with 12 more on the cable channel Universo, while all 104 games streamed on Peacock. Futbol de Primera had the Spanish radio broadcasting rights. It was reported that at least 20 percent of Telemundo's viewers stated that English was their primary language instead of Spanish. This was partly due to the fact that Fox cut to commercials during the hydration breaks while Telemundo stayed with its coverage. Furthermore, Peacock was the cheaper subscription at $10.99 per month versus Fox One at $19.99 per month. This thus reportedly led to "tensions" between Fox/FS1/Fox One's parent company the Fox Corporation, and Telemundo/Peacock's parent company NBCUniversal. As a result, FIFA will bundle the U.S. English and Spanish rights together for the next World Cups to increase their bids.

Bell Media's coverage was split across the CTV Television Network (with streams on Crave) and TSN in English and Noovo and RDS in French. TSN Radio held the national audio streaming rights.

In Mexico, Televisa and TV Azteca held the rights to 32 matches (the same set of 32 aired on both broadcasters). All 104 are available via streaming on a premium tier of Televisa's Vix platform. Radio rights were held by Radiópolis and its W Radio. The rights for TV Azteca and Radiópolis were granted under sublicense from Televisa.

== Global social media platforms ==
On January 8, 2026, FIFA announced TikTok as a "preferred platform" for World Cup video content. Under the agreement, official broadcasters streamed selected match content through a dedicated World Cup hub on the TikTok app. A similar agreement with YouTube was announced on March 17. It allowed broadcasters to stream selected matches in full on their official YouTube channels, while the opening ten minutes of every match could also be streamed on the platform. The agreement was subject to existing territorial broadcasting arrangements. In Brazil, YouTube's partnership was implemented through CazéTV to show all tournament games for free in Brazil.

== Broadcasters ==
Sport24 secured the rights for international in-flight and cruise ship travel.

Country/Region	Broadcaster	Ref.
Afghanistan	ATN	
Albania	TV Klan; SuperSport	
Algeria	ENTV	
Andorra	RTVE; M6 (Note: 54 matches only); Mediapro/DAZN (Note: Agreement between Mediapro and DAZN. DAZN will produce the games for Mediapro cable channels, and in turn, DAZN will be allowed to show games on the streaming platform.)	
Angola	TPA; Z Sports	
Argentina	Telefe; TV Pública (Note: Eight Argentina matches plus a third place match); TyC Sports	
Armenia	Fast Sports	
Aruba	Telearuba	
Australia	SBS	
Austria	ORF; ServusTV; Magenta Sport	
Azerbaijan	İTV; CBC Sport (Note: 12 matches)	
Bangladesh	BTV; T Sports; Somoy TV; Toffee; Bioscope+; My Robi; iScreen	
Barbados	Caribbean Broadcasting Corporation	
Belarus	Sport TV	
Belgium	VRT; RTBF	
Benin	Bénin TV	
Bermuda	Bermuda Broadcasting	
Bolivia	Red Uno; Unitel; Entel; Tigo Sports	
Bosnia and Herzegovina	Arena Sport	
Brazil	Grupo Globo (Note: 55 Matches only, free-to-air television, pay TV, and streaming); CazéTV (Note: All matches available free on YouTube); SBT/N Sports (Note: 32 matches only, co-production cooperation on free-to-air television and pay TV)	
Brunei	RTB	
Bulgaria	BNT	
Burkina Faso	RTB	
Burundi	RTNB	
Cambodia	Hang Meas	
Cameroon	CRTV; Canal 2; MSI	
Canada	Bell Media	
Cape Verde	RTC	
Caribbean (Note: Excluding Cuba, Dominican Republic)	Rush Sports (English); DSports (Spanish)	
Chile	Chilevisión	
Chad	Télé Tchad	
China	CMG; Migu; Xiaohongshu	
Colombia	Caracol; RCN; Win Sports	
Congo	Télé Congo	
Cook Islands	Vaka TV	
Costa Rica	Teletica; Tigo Sports	
Croatia	HRT	
Cuba	ICRT	
Curaçao	Nos Pais Television	
Cyprus	Sigma TV	
Czechia	ČT; TV Nova	
Democratic Republic of Congo	RTNC	
Denmark	DR; TV2	
Dominican Republic	CDN 37; Pio Deportes	
Ecuador	Teleamazonas	
El Salvador	TCS; Tigo Sports	
Estonia	TV3 Estonia; ERR	
Eswatini	Eswatini TV	
Ethiopia	Hagerie TV	
Faroe Islands	KvF	
Fiji	FBC	
Finland	Yle; MTV3	
France (Metropolitan)	M6 (Note: 54 matches only); beIN Sports	
France (Ultramarine)	La 1ère; Antenne Réunion (Réunion)	
Gabon	RTG	
Gambia	GRTS	
Georgia	Rustavi 2; Setanta Sports	
Germany	ARD; ZDF; Magenta Sport	
Ghana	GBC; Multimedia Group; UTV; GHOne; ChannelOne; Ignite Media; Media General; Max TV; Woezor; Sporty TV	
Greece	ERT	
Guatemala	Albavisión; Tigo Sports	
Guinea	RTG	
Guyana	ENet	
Haiti	TNH; Canal+	
Honduras	Televicentro; Tigo Sports	
Hong Kong	Now TV	
Hungary	MTVA	
Iceland	RÚV	
India	Zee; Doordarshan (Note: Eight matches only (opening match, four quarter finals, both semis, and a final), terrestrial broadcast only via DD Dish)	
Indonesia	TVRI; Fola Play	
Iran	IRIB; GEM TV; Persiana Sports; Grand Sport	
Ireland	RTÉ	
Israel	KAN; Charlton	
Italy	RAI (Note: 35 matches (including opening match, both semi finals, and a final)); DAZN	
Ivory Coast	RTI; NCI	
Jamaica	TVJ	
Japan	NHK (Note: 33 matches in Terrestrial TV and NHK+/NHK One, all matches in NHK BS Premium 4K); Nippon TV (Note: 15 matches only); Fuji TV (Note: 10 matches only); DAZN	
Kazakhstan	QAZTRK	
Kenya	KBC; SportyTV; Azam TV	
Kosovo	RTK; TV Vala; Arena Sport	
Kyrgyzstan	KTRK; Beeline	
Laos	Unitel	
Latvia	TV3 Latvia	
Liberia	LBS	
Liechtenstein	SRG SSR	
Lithuania	TV3 Lithuania	
Luxembourg	RTBF; ARD; ZDF	
Macau	TDM	
Madagascar	TVM	
Malawi	Azam TV	
Malaysia	RTM; Unifi TV	
Maldives	PSM; Medianet	
Mali	ORTM	
Malta	Television Malta	
Mauritius	MBC	
MENA	beIN Sports	
Mexico	TelevisaUnivision (Note: 32 matches on Free-to-air TV and all 104 matches on their streaming service Vix with a premium add-on); TV Azteca (Note: 32 matches only, on Free-to-air TV and their website, same matches as on Televisa)	
Moldova	Jurnal TV; We Sport TV	
Mongolia	EduTV; NTV; Suld TV; MNB; mobihome VOO	
Montenegro	RTCG; Arena Sport	
Morocco	SNRT	
Mozambique	TVM; Miramar; Z Sports	
Myanmar	Mytel; Canal+	
Namibia	NBC	
Nepal	Himalaya Sports; Dgo	
Netherlands	NOS	
New Zealand	TVNZ	
Nicaragua	Grupo Ratensa; Tigo Sports	
Niger	RTN	
Nigeria	SportyTV; StarTimes	
North Macedonia	Arena Sport	
Norway	NRK; TV2	
Pacific Islands	Digicel	
Pakistan	PTV Sports; Tapmad	
Palau	PNCC	
Panama	RPC/COS; TVN Media; Tigo Sports	
Papua New Guinea	Digicel	
Paraguay	Trece; GEN TV	
Peru	América Televisión	
Philippines	Aleph Arena (Note: 40 matches only via Youtube); TAP DMV; Cignal PPV	
Poland	TVP	
Portugal	RTP (Note: 20 matches divided among RTP, SIC and TVI); SIC; TVI; LiveModeTV (Note: One match per day); Sport TV	
Puerto Rico	Fox Sports; Telemundo	
Qatar	Alkass Sports	
Romania	Antena	
Russia	Match TV	
Rwanda	RBA; Azam TV	
Saint Lucia	Winners Sports TV	
San Marino	RAI; DAZN	
Senegal	RTS	
Serbia	PTC; Arena Sport	
Seychelles	SBC	
Singapore	Mediacorp (Note: FTA coverage of 28 matches (24 for group stage (inc. opening match), both semis, and both finals))	
Slovakia	STVR; TV JOJ	
Slovenia	RTV SLO; Arena Sport	
Solomon Islands	TTV	
South Africa	SABC; SportyTV	
South America (Note: Excluding Aruba, Bolivia, Brazil, Curaçao, Guyana, Paraguay and Suriname)	DSports; Disney+ (Note: For Argentina, Colombia, Ecuador, Uruguay, Chile, Perú and Venezuela, 30 matches: 22 from the group stage, 3 from the round of 32, 2 from the round of 16, 1 quarterfinal, the 2 semifinals, and the final. In addition, in Argentina, Colombia, Ecuador, Uruguay, Disney+ Premium will broadcast the matches featuring that country’s national team)	
South Korea (Note: Unlike years prior, FIFA has not handled the North Korea rights to the South Korean broadcasters)	JTBC; KBS (Note: Sub-licensed from JTBC); NAVER Sports/CHZZK	
Spain	RTVE; Mediapro/DAZN	
Sri Lanka	MTV; PEOTV; Dialog TV	
Sub-Saharan Africa	New World TV (Note: French-language rights); SuperSport (Note: English and Portuguese-language rights)	
Suriname	STVS; ATV	
Sweden	SVT; TV4	
Switzerland	SRG SSR	
Taiwan	ELTA (Note: Main broadcaster; For CHT MOD and OTT (ELTA.tv and Hami Video)); EBC (Note: Cable TV broadcast; 37 matches); TTV (Note: Free-to-air (Terrestrial/Cable) TV broadcast; 34 matches)	
Tajikistan	Varzish TV	
Tanzania	TBC; Azam TV	
Thailand	MONOMAX Sports (Note: At least 1 daily match on FTA channel, All matches on their streaming service); Thairath TV (Note: 2 matches on FTA channel)	
Timor-Leste	RTTL; ETO	
Togo	TVT	
Turkey	TRT	
Turkmenistan	Turkmenistan Sport	
Uganda	UBC; Azam TV	
Ukraine	MEGOGO	
United Kingdom	BBC (Note: Audio rights to all matches; television rights to 50% of matches and shared coverage of the final); ITV (Note: Television rights to 50% of matches and shared coverage of the final across ITV1/STV and ITV4)	
United States	Fox Sports (English); Telemundo (Spanish)	
Uruguay	Canal 5; Antel TV	
Uzbekistan	Zo'r TV; MTRK; Setanta Sports (Note: OTT streaming only via official website)	
Vanuatu	VBTC	
Venezuela	Televen	
Vietnam	VTV; VOV	
Zambia	ZNBC; Mafken TV; Sun Sports TV; Azam TV	
Zimbabwe	ZBC; Azam TV	
