= PS22 Chorus =

American elementary school chorus

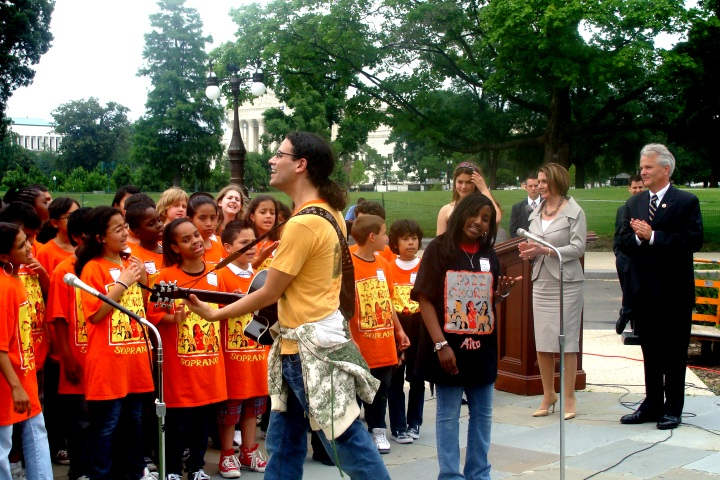
- PS22 Chorus in 2009, performing at the United States Capitol

Background information
- Origin: Graniteville, New York, U.S.
- Genres: Pop, traditionals, gospel, R&B
- Years active: 2000–present
- Members: Director; Gregg Breinberg, "Mr. B" (guitar, piano); Chorus; 60-70 fifth-graders from Public School 22; Guest Musicians; Chris Eberle (guitar, drums)
- Website: ps22chorus.blogspot.com

The PS22 Chorus, directed by Gregg Breinberg, is a Webby Award-winning public elementary school chorus from PS 22 in Graniteville, Staten Island, New York City. It is composed of 70-80 fifth-graders. PS 22 is one of the largest elementary schools on Staten Island. PS22 Chorus has performed with a multitude of musical acts (e.g. Katy Perry, O.A.R., Carrie Underwood, Portugal. The Man, and Fifth Harmony) and has had celebrated appearances on numerous national and international broadcasts throughout the years (including the widely publicized performance of "Over The Rainbow" that closed the 83rd Academy Awards and an appearance in the 2026 FIFA World Cup final halftime show), after its videos had gained worldwide attention within the popular video-sharing site YouTube. To date, the chorus's YouTube videos have been watched more than 100 million times.

== History ==
Students are assigned to the chorus after an annual auditioning process at the beginning of each school year. The chorus meets twice a week during school hours to practice, and performs throughout the year at school functions, local events, and on special requests.

The PS22 chorus was founded in 2000 by the school's music teacher, Gregg Breinberg, who led his 2001-2002 PS 22 Chorus to live TV in the aftermath of the September 11 attacks. He started blogging in September 2006 about the Chorus, following requests on a Tori Amos fan page, where he had shared some of his videos. Since then the chorus has become an Internet phenomenon. In 2009 New York magazine called it "the best-known elementary-school chorus on the planet". The director Gregg Breinberg won a Tribeca Disruptive Innovation Award in 2017.

== Performance highlights ==
Chorus of 2006/2007

- The chorus performs for singer-songwriter Tori Amos at the Sony Atrium in New York City. (May 4, 2007)
- Celebrity gossip blogger Perez Hilton starts blogging about the PS22 chorus and becomes an influential supporter.

Chorus of 2007/2008

- Neil Finn, lead singer of the New Zealand band Crowded House invites the chorus to sing at the band's sold-out concert in New York. (April 30, 2008)
- Members of the PS22 chorus of 2007/2008 are featured in several videos of the 2009 television series The Electric Company

Chorus of 2008/2009

- The electronic band Passion Pit invites the PS22 chorus to sing background vocals on three tracks ("The Reeling", "Little Secrets", "Let Your Love Grow Tall") of their debut album Manners. (2009-01-16) "The Reeling" is later nominated for an MTV Video Music Award as best breakthrough video.
- The chorus performs with country singer Cooper Boone at a DKMS charity Gala and meets Chelsea Clinton and pop singer Rihanna. (May 7, 2009)
- Nightline features an in-depth look at the PS22 Chorus. (June 10, 2009)
- Stevie Nicks (Fleetwood Mac) invites the chorus to sing for her at Madison Square Garden. (June 11, 2009)
- The chorus performs on Good Morning America (ABC) (June 22, 2009)
- The chorus appears on It's On with Alexa Chung (MTV). (August 3, 2009)
- The chorus is featured on the nationally televised VH1 Divas Special 2009 (September 17, 2009)

Chorus of 2009/2010

- The newly formed chorus of 2009/2010 is visited by the cast (Naturi Naughton, Anna Maria Perez de Tagle, Kherington Payne, Asher Book) and director Kevin Tancharoen of the new 2009 movie Fame. The school is presented a $30,000 check for a new keyboard lab by VH1 Save The Music Foundation Executive Director Paul Cothran, and Director Of Music for New York City Department of Education Barbara Murray. (September 14, 2009)
- Billboard magazine invites the chorus to perform at an award ceremony for Beyoncé and Lady Gaga. (October 2, 2009)
- The chorus performs alongside the Cross Border Orchestra of Ireland at the Cross Cultural Youth Festival held at The Armory, Washington Heights for 2500 children from all five boroughs of New York. The event is covered by Fox5 New York. (October 27, 2009)
- Paul Rieckhoff, founder of Iraq and Afghanistan Veterans of America, invites the chorus to sing at the Third Annual Heroes Gala at Gotham Hall in New York, hosted by NBC's Brian Williams. (November 10, 2009)
- The chorus performs with rapper Common at the National Tree Lighting ceremony at the White House with President Barack Obama and Vice President Joe Biden attending. (December 3, 2009)
- During their "Songs From the Heart" tour, Celtic Woman visits PS22 and invites the chorus to join them on two songs at their Radio City Music Hall concert. (February 26, 2010)
- After hearing the chorus's interpretation of his song "One Day", Chasidic reggae artist Matisyahu visits PS22 and invites the chorus to perform two songs at his concert at New York City's 92nd Street Y. (March 16, 2010)

Chorus of 2010/2011

- The students perform at the charity organization "New Yorkers for Children". (September 22, 2010)
- At the ONEXONE Gala supported by Matt Damon, the children sing with Matisyahu. (October 27, 2010)
- The chorus perform at Iraq and Afghanistan Veterans of America in Manhattan hosted by NBC Anchor Brian Williams. (November 10, 2010)
- The children are visited by Kylie Minogue and perform with her, including the first ever live performance of "Put Your Hands Up (If You Feel Love)". (November 29, 2010)
- The chorus is visited by Bruce Cohen and Anne Hathaway at their 11th Annual Winter Concert and invited to perform at the 83rd Academy Awards. (December 16, 2010)
- The students perform an unprecedented closing number of "Over The Rainbow" at the 83rd Academy Awards on February 27, 2011.
- The children perform with Katy Perry on The Oprah Winfrey Show post Oscar show at the Kodak Theatre. (February 28, 2011)
- The chorus perform together with The Bangles at the Tribeca Film Festival (April 20, 2011)
- Freelance Whales visits the school and performs with the Chorus. The children join in on singing "Hannah" and "Generator ^First Floor" as well as listened to the Freelance Whales perform "Generator ^Second Floor" all of which were from the album Weathervanes (March 30, 2011)
- David Cook visits PS22 and performs several songs including "The Last Goodbye" and "Rolling in the Deep" with the chorus. (June 10, 2011)
- The group reunites to perform a 40-minute set at the Newport Folk Festival in Rhode Island. (July 30, 2011)
- PS22 Chorus appears on Sesame Street in a video singing the iconic Sesame song "Somebody Come and Play." (October 21, 2011)
- Documentary about the 2010-11 chorus entitled "Once In A Lullaby: The PS22 Chorus Story" premieres at Tribeca Film Festival. (April 29, 2012)
- PS22 Chorus "Firework" video appears in Katy Perry 3-D film, Part of Me. (July 4, 2012)

Chorus of 2011/2012

- The children are visited by artist V V Brown who performs several songs with the chorus. (November 16, 2011)
- The chorus performed with Thirty Seconds to Mars for the songs "Closer to the Edge" and "Kings and Queens" in what was most likely their final concert at Saint Peter's Church in Chelsea, New York. (December 10, 2011)
- The children are visited by artist Susan Justice and film several songs with her. (January 27, 2012)
- PS22 Chorus alumnus Denise Bestman appears in a commercial for Target singing the song "Rolling In The Deep" by Adele which airs during the 2012 Grammys. (February 12, 2012)
- The students perform a tribute to Whitney Houston singing "The Greatest Love of All" on the Piers Morgan Tonight show on CNN. (February 17, 2012)
- Sinéad O'Connor invites PS22 to open up her show at the Highline Ballroom in NYC, and joins the chorus onstage to perform her song "Jackie." (February 24, 2012)
- The kids sing "Bridge Over Troubled Water" to legendary singer-songwriter, Paul Simon, at 2012 New Yorker for New York Gala (February 27, 2012)
- PS22 Chorus performs at NEA's (National Education Association) Read Across America Event at New York Public Library featuring Zac Efron and Danny DeVito in honor of the birthday of Dr. Seuss (March 2, 2012)
- Celtic Woman returns to PS22 and records several songs with the chorus (March 12, 2012)
- PS22 Chorus records a video promo to save music education with Ingrid Michaelson for DoSomething.org in conjunction with Vh1's Save The Music Foundation (March 9, 2012)
- Gym Class Heroes invites PS22 Chorus to take the stage with them at their concert at Wagner College to perform "The Fighter" (April 21, 2012)
- The chorus performs "Good Girl" and "So Small" with Grammy Award-winning artist, Carrie Underwood, when she visits the kids at their school. (April 27, 2012)
- PS22 Chorus sings several songs with Walk the Moon including "I Can Lift A Car" and "Anna Sun" in the PS22 auditorium. (May 22, 2012)
- Alternative hip hop duo Chiddy Bang visits PS22 and performs "Mind Your Manners" and "Talkin' To Myself" with the children. (May 24, 2012)
- The chorus serenades Jennifer Hudson at Samsung's Hope For Children Gala in NYC. (June 4, 2012)
- PS22 Chorus is visited by Malaysian singer-songwriter Yuna and together perform four of her original songs. (June 7, 2012)
- ABC World News does a follow-up feature on the PS22 Chorus. (June 24, 2012)
- Discovery Channel and affiliated networks begin airing a public service announcement for the National Forest Foundation featuring PS22 Chorus singing "Somewhere Only We Know" by alternative rock band Keane. (July 16, 2012)
- A group of 20+ PS22 Chorus 2011/12 members appear on the season finale of America's Got Talent to sing "Edge of Glory" by Lady Gaga (September 13, 2012)
- VH1 premieres Carrie Underwood: Behind The Music which concludes with footage of Carrie singing with the 2011/12 PS22 Chorus. (September 30, 2012)

Chorus of 2012/2013

- The new group of fifth graders record two videos with Creed frontman Scott Stapp. (October 3, 2012)
- PS22 Chorus sings at the opening of Four Freedoms Park in Roosevelt Island for former President Bill Clinton, Governor Andrew Cuomo, former Secretary of State Henry Kissinger and more. (October 17, 2012)
- American Idol winner Phillip Phillips joins the PS22 Chorus to perform an online benefit concert for StageIt.com with all proceeds going to victims of Hurricane Sandy. (November 15, 2012)
- Members of the chorus ring the opening bell at the New York Stock Exchange with Macy's Thanksgiving Parade Executive Producer Amy Kule. (November 21, 2012)
- The PS22 Chorus performs at the 86th Annual Macy's Thanksgiving Day Parade. (November 22, 2012)
- The chorus joined Carrie Underwood to sing her song "So Small" in Newark at the Prudential Center. (December 1, 2012)
- The PS22 Chorus joins President Barack Obama in celebrating the 57th Presidential Inauguration and Dr.Martin Luther King Jr. Day. (January 21, 2013)
- PS22 Chorus performs its viral cover of "Don't You Worry Child" by Swedish House Mafia on ABC's Katie (March 1, 2013)
- Teen Vogue magazine features the PS22 Chorus with Elle King in their May Music issue. (April 19, 2013)
- Delta Rae visits PS22 to perform several songs with the chorus. (April 22, 2013)
- The kids perform their version of "Disparate Youth" with Santigold. (May 9, 2013)
- PS22 Chorus performs two songs with country act The Henningsens. (May 15, 2013)
- The chorus attends the Sesame Gala at Cipriani's and performs 2 songs with The Sesame Muppets. (May 28, 2013)
- Do Something invites the PS22 Chorus to open their 20th birthday celebration at the Hammerstein Ballroom and record a video of an acoustic version of "MMMBop" with Hanson. (June 5, 2013)
- Michael Franti visits PS22 Chorus and performs three of his songs with the group. (June 7, 2013)
- PS22 Chorus performs with Jessica Sanchez at The Trevor LIVE Gala in NYC. (June 17, 2013)

Chorus of 2013/2014

- The group is a featured act at the Global Citizen Festival, singing to an audience of 60,000 people in Central Park. The concert is also livestreamed and broadcast on several networks. (September 28, 2013)
- PS22 Chorus performs with Chris Daughtry in a rendition of the band Daughtry's newest single, "Waiting for Superman", found here on YouTube. (October 15, 2013)
- The kids perform the national anthem at the start of the New York Marathon. (November 3, 2013)
- PS22 Chorus salutes Lady Gaga with a medley of her songs at Carnegie Hall where she accepts her Glamour Woman of the Year Award. (November 11, 2013)
- Singer-songwriter Gavin DeGraw visits the chorus and sings two of his songs with the kids. (November 13, 2013)
- Indie band The Mowgli's perform two songs with the PS22 Chorus. (November 19, 2013)
- PS22 Chorus sings with Emily Kinney from the popular AMC's The Walking Dead. (December 9, 2013)
- The chorus appears on NBC's Today Show with Kathie Lee Gifford and Hoda Kotb and opens the show with two Christmas selections, including "O Come All Ye Faithful". (December 24, 2013)
- Chorus joins in Teddy Geiger in "Walking in the Sun" (February 3, 2014)
- Girl Group Fifth Harmony performs two of their songs and a short rendition of "Jar of Hearts" by Christina Perri with the PS22 Chorus (March 6, 2014)
- The chorus joins the band Bleachers in singing "I Wanna Get Better" (June 19, 2014)
- Chorus takes part in Apollo Jam performing "Oh Happy Day" with Gladys Knight, Edwin Hawkins and Matthew Whitaker. (July 15, 2014)

Chorus of 2014/2015

- The chorus joins The Swon Brothers in "Pretty Beautiful" (October 9, 2014)
- The chorus performs "Picture Me Gone" with Ariel Pink. (October 27, 2014)
- Sara Bareilles visits the chorus where they perform "Brave" to her (December 31, 2014)

Chorus of 2015/2016

- The chorus' rendition of "Hallelujah" from Leonard Cohen becomes an instant hit attracting above 2 million views. (December 2, 2015)

Chorus of 2016/2017

- American rock band Portugal. The Man visits the chorus performing "Feel It Still" with them (June 22, 2017)

Chorus of 2017/2018

- The chorus joins in Albin Lee Meldau singing "Same Boat" and "Blue Christmas". (November 29, 2017)
- The chorus performs "The First Noel" with Leslie Odom Jr. for the Christmas season (December 6, 2017)
- The chorus performs "Dreams" in memory of Dolores O'Riordan from The Cranberries (January 28, 2018)
- They make a promotional theme song for the live trivia game app HQ (April 30, 2018)
- The chorus performs "Younger" with A Great Big World (June 25, 2018)
- The chorus performs "Paradise is Waiting" with the musical project St. Lucia, based in Brooklyn (July 3, 2018)

Chorus of 2019

- The chorus joins AJR in singing "100 Bad Days". (April 16, 2019)

Chorus of 2025/2026

- The chorus performs at the halftime ceremony of the final match of the 2026 FIFA World Cup.

== Media coverage ==
TV appearances

- ABC News Nightline (ABC)
- Good Day New York (Fox 5)
- MTV News with Sway Calloway (MTV)
- NBC Nightly News (MSNBC)
- Hollywood 411 (TV Guide Network)
- The Bonnie Hunt Show
- Anderson Cooper 360° (CNN)
- RTL Television (German television station)
- 83rd Academy Awards
- The Oprah Winfrey Show (CBS)
- Katy Perry: Part of Me Movie

Radio appearances

- All Things Considered (NPR)
- Chris Evans (BBC)
- Q (CBC)
- The Howard Stern Show
- Joan Hamburg (WOR-2)
- Rubrik 'Musik' (detektor.fm)
- Akustischer Adventskalender (detektor.fm)

Newspaper/Online newspaper articles

- The New York Times
- New York Magazine
- In June 2009 an Associated Press article by Verena Dobnik brought worldwide attention to the chorus. The article ran in prominent newspapers and on websites like The Guardian, The Boston Globe, The Seattle Times, The Huffington Post and many more.
- Dein Spiegel (German magazine for children)
- Time
- Daily News (New York)
- Los Angeles Times

== Awards ==
- COAHSi (Council on the Arts & Humanities for Staten Island) Award 2003 and 2009
- Tribeca Disruptive Innovation Award 2010
- Webby Artist of the Year Award 2010
- Common Sense Media Award 2011
