= Cooper Boone =

American singer-songwriter (born 1963)

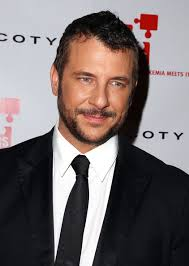

Background information
- Also known as: Coop
- Born: September 11, 1963 (age 63); Wells, Minnesota, USA
- Genres: Country, country pop
- Occupations: Singer-songwriter psychologist chef
- Instrument: Vocals
- Years active: 2006–present
- Website: cooperboone.com cooperstable.com

Cooper Boone (born September 11, 1963) is an American country music artist, psychologist and chef.

== Early years ==
Boone was born Michael John Schroeder in Wells, Minnesota, and raised in St. Joseph, Minnesota, where he sang in church choirs and learned to play trumpet and piano. He holds two master's degrees and a doctoral degree in clinical psychology.

== Career ==
=== Psychology ===
Boone moved to New York City in 1994, where he started a clinical psychology practice, working on issues including drug addiction, 9/11 survivors, couples counseling, career problems and stress management. In 2010, he submitted an application to ABC's "Dear GMA Advice Guru" contest, as a part of Good Morning America's search for an on-air advice guru. Of 15,000 applicants, he was named one of four finalists and was featured giving advice on an episode of Good Morning America on January 24, 2011.

=== Music ===
In 2005, Boone began writing country pop songs and recorded his debut album, Dance in the Wind, which was released the following year. After an EP in 2008, which was produced by Anthony Krizan (former Spin Doctors lead guitarist), Boone's second full-length album, which was self-titled, was released in August 2009. Its first single, "Cougar Dream," is a lighthearted ode to attractive middle-aged women. Other tracks on the album take a more serious tone, inspired by stories told to him by some of his patients, particularly those who were affected by the September 11 attacks.

Boone was named Best Country Artist at the 2008 Hollywood Music Awards; won Musikfest's 2008 Battle of the Bands showcase, earning a spot at the 10-day music festival held annually in Bethlehem, Pennsylvania; won a 2010 Independent Music Award for Country Vox Pop; won a 2009 Independent Singer-Songwriter Award for Country Song for "Mending Fences"; and has been nominated for Hollywood Music in Media Awards and Los Angeles Music Awards. He performed "Mending Fences" live on ABC News Now in 2009, and co-wrote "One Song," the theme song for DKMS Americas, which he performed at a 2009 DKMS fundraiser with the PS22 Chorus. Starting in 1997, he performed at the Country Living Fairs in Atlanta, Columbus, Austin and Rhinebeck, New York. He has opened for headliners including Trace Adkins, Craig Morgan, The Bacon Brothers and Bob Guiney, and performed at the 1996 Miss America's Outstanding Teen pageant as a featured soloist. His song "Made in America" was the theme song for the Travel Channel's Made in America, hosted by John Ratzenberger, which ran from 2004 to 2008. He has performed for Paula Deen live as well as on the Paula Deen Network several times.

=== Cooking ===
Boone has been a featured guest chef on various television programs and hosts a website, Cooper's Table, where he shares his recipes and happenings on his farm.

He interviewed Paula Deen, Trisha Yearwood, Tyler Florence and others for Country Living magazine at the 2011 New York City Wine and Food Festival, and is host of the Country Living Blue Ribbon Blogger Awards.

== Personal life ==
Boone and his partner, Mark Veeder, have been together since 2001. They reside on their farm in North East, Pennsylvania, with their twin daughters and their chickens.

== Discography ==
=== Albums ===
- Dance in the Wind (2006)
- Cooper Boone (2009)

=== Extended plays ===
- Made in America (2008)

== Awards ==
Award	Year	Category	Result	Notes
Musikfest	2008	Best Regional Band	Won	
Hollywood Music in Media Awards	2008	Best Country Artist	Won	
Hollywood Music in Media Awards	2009	Best Music Video	Nominated	"Country Living" (Cooper Boone)
Hollywood Music in Media Awards	2010	Country Song Award	Nominated	"In an Instant" (single)
Independent Music Awards	2010	Country Vox Pop	Won	"Country Living" (Cooper Boone)
Los Angeles Music Awards	2010	Country Artist of the Year	Nominated	
Los Angeles Music Awards	2010	Best Country Album	Nominated	Cooper Boone
