= Everything Hallelujah =

Song by Justin Bieber

from the album Swag II
- Released: September 5, 2025
- Genre: Gospel-soul
- Length: 4:09
- Label: Def Jam; ILH
- Songwriters: Carter Lang; Daniel Chetrit; Dylan Wiggins; Eddie Benjamin; Eli Teplin; Jackson lee Morgan; Justin Bieber; Tobias Jesso Jr.
- Producers: Lang; Wiggins; Benjamin; Teplin

"Everything Hallelujah" is a song recorded by the Canadian singer Justin Bieber. The song was initially released on September 5, 2025, through Def Jam Recordings and ILH Productions, as a part of Bieber's album, Swag II; it achieved commercial attention in April 2026 due to sparking an internet trend, and once again in July of the same year after a live World Cup performance. The song was written by Carter Lang, Daniel Chetrit, Dylan Wiggins, Eddie Benjamin, Eli Teplin, Jackson lee Morgan, Bieber, and Tobias Jesso Jr., and produced by Lang, Wiggins, Benjamin, and Teplin. Notable live versions include performances at Coachella and the FIFA World Cup.

== Style ==
"Everything Hallelujah" demonstrates the style of gospel-soul. In the track, Bieber's voice is layered to resemble a "pseudo-choir". The song utilizes "gently picked acoustic" and "angelic synths". The track's lyrics consist of Bieber mentioning various things which he is thankful for, following each listed item with the word "hallelujah". In the track he "searches for hope amid anxiety". It has been noted for its "pure honesty" and "overwhelming sense of gratitude". The song has also been noted as being one of Bieber's "most explicit expressions of worship to date", demonstrating themes of "surrender, praise, and devotion".

== Reception ==
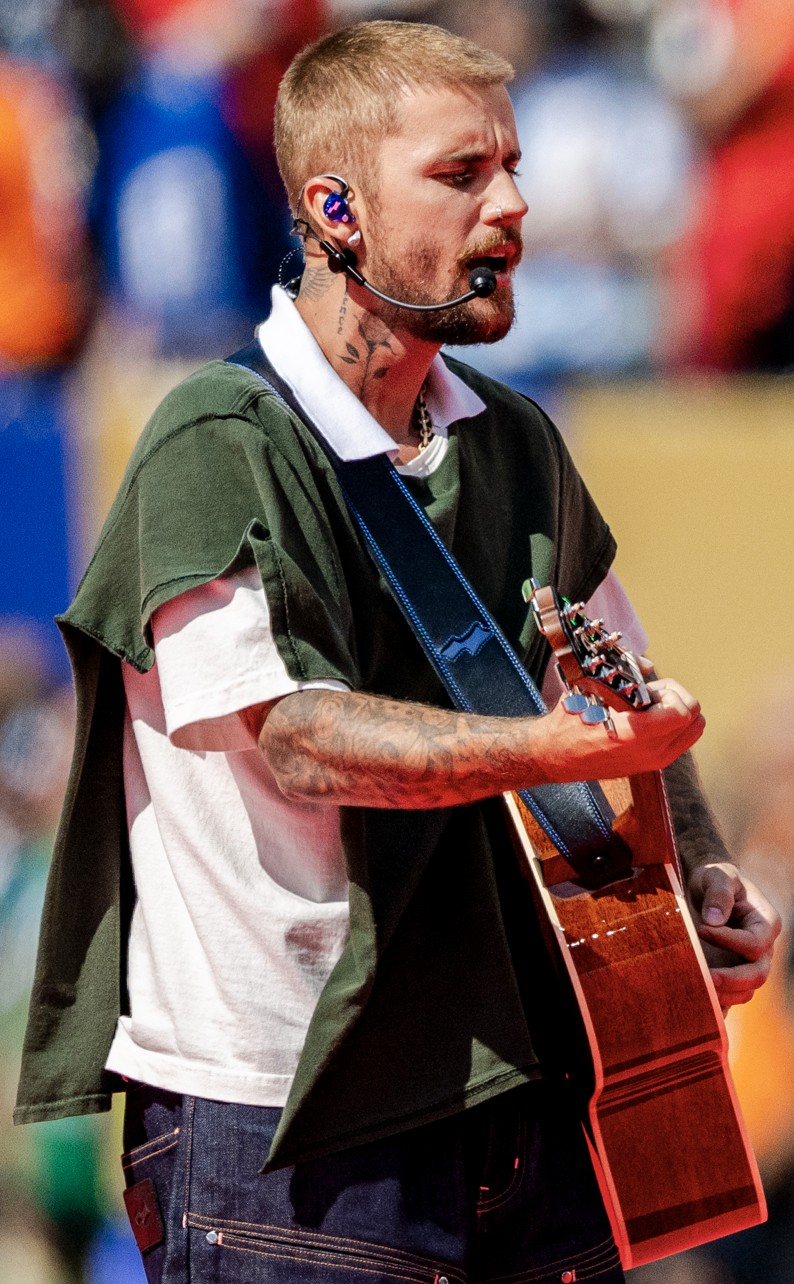
Bieber performing "Everything Hallelujah" at the 2026 FIFA World Cup final halftime show

=== Critical ===
"Everything Hallelujah" received mixed reception from critics. Writing for The Guardian, Katie Hawthorne wrote that Bieber "[transforms] a profound realisation about his faith into lyrical mundanity" and "musical cliche", as well as criticizing the track's use of "squeaking acoustic guitar strings". In an alternative vein, RGM praised the song's vulnerability, writing that it "lingers with you long after it ends". Writing for Billboard, Andrew Unterberger wrote that it "feels quite heartfelt and powerful... without ever feeling the least bit schlocky". The song ranked last in ESPN's ranking of the 2026 FIFA World Cup final's halftime performances.

=== Public ===
Several months following the release of Swag II, Bieber performed the song at Coachella, which would become his first live performance in several years. As a result of the performance, a TikTok trend began gaining prominence; the trend's premise would involve people making seemingly random statements and following each claim with the word "hallelujah", similar to what is written in the song's lyrics. The trend attracted attention from other celebrities, and parodies were released by Lewis Capaldi, Kylie Jenner and the White House. It has stood out amongst other contemporary internet trends because of its "innocent" and "positive" background.

However, many fans were left confused after the song was played by Bieber at the 2026 FIFA World Cup final halftime show, due to a sharp contrast between the high energetic environment of the event and the slow-pacing of the song. Viewers online felt it "killed the mood" and a more "uptempo" song would've been a better fit.

=== Commercial ===
"Everything Hallelujah" made its chart debut on May 2, 2026, following success from the internet trend as well as promotion from the Coachella performance. Earning 2.4 million streams and 1,000 digital sales in the United States, it debuted at numbers 6, 1, and 16 on the Billboard Hot Christian Songs, Christian Digital Song Sales, and Bubbling Under Hot 100 Singles charts, respectively. In Canada it entered the Canadian Hot 100 at its peak position of number 89. The song marked Bieber's first top-10 entry onto the Hot Christian Songs chart, as well as his first entry onto the chart since the release of the Freedom extended play in 2021. It also became his first charted track onto the Christian Streaming Songs chart, where it hit number 5. Due to its explicitly Christian themes, the song received attention from both secular and religious audiences together. As a result of its rendition at the World Cup, it received a 240% bump in global Spotify streams.

== Personnel ==
Credits adapted from Tidal:

- Adam Burt – masterer
- Carter Lang – producer, writer
- Dale Becker – masterer
- Daniel Chetrit – writer
- Dylan Wiggins – producer, writer
- Eddie Benjamin – producer, writer
- Eli Teplin – producer, writer
- Felix Byrne – recording engineer
- Jackson lee Morgan – writer
- Josh Gudwin – mixer
- Justin Bieber – writer, lead vocals
- Katie Harvey – masterer
- Kegn Venegas – masterer
- Noah McCorkle – masterer
- Tobias Jesso Jr. – writer

== Charts ==
Chart performance for "Everything Hallelujah"
Chart (2026)	Peak position
Canada Hot 100 (Billboard)	76
Sweden Heatseeker (Sverigetopplistan)	2
UK Singles Downloads (Official Charts)	73
US Bubbling Under Hot 100 (Billboard)	6
US Hot Christian Songs (Billboard)	2
