= Best Man =

The best man is the first attendant to the groom, in a wedding party.

Best man or Best men may also refer to:

== Films ==
- The Best Man, a 1916 film starting Victor Moore
- The Best Man (1964 film), an adaptation of the Gore Vidal play
- The Best Man (1998 film), also called Il testimone dello sposo, an Italian film
- The Best Man (1999 film), starring Taye Diggs, Nia Long, and Morris Chestnut
- The Best Man (2005 film), starring Stuart Townsend
- Best Men, a 1997 American crime comedy film

== Literature ==
- The Best Man (play), 1960 play by Gore Vidal
- "The Best Man" (1905), short story by Edith Wharton

== Music ==
- The Best Man (EP), a 2014 mini-album by Wheesung
- "The Best Man" (song), a single from Blaine Larsen's 2004 album Off to Join the World

== Television ==
- "Best Man" (The Detectives), a 1997 episode
- "Best Man" (The King of Queens), a 1999 episode
- "The Best Man" (Happy Days), a 1974 episode
- "The Best Man" (How I Met Your Mother), a 2011 episode
- "Best Men" (Modern Family), a 2013 episode
- "The Best Men", a 2014 episode of Plebs

== See also ==
- Bestman, a surname
