= Phiona Nyamutoro =

Ugandan politician

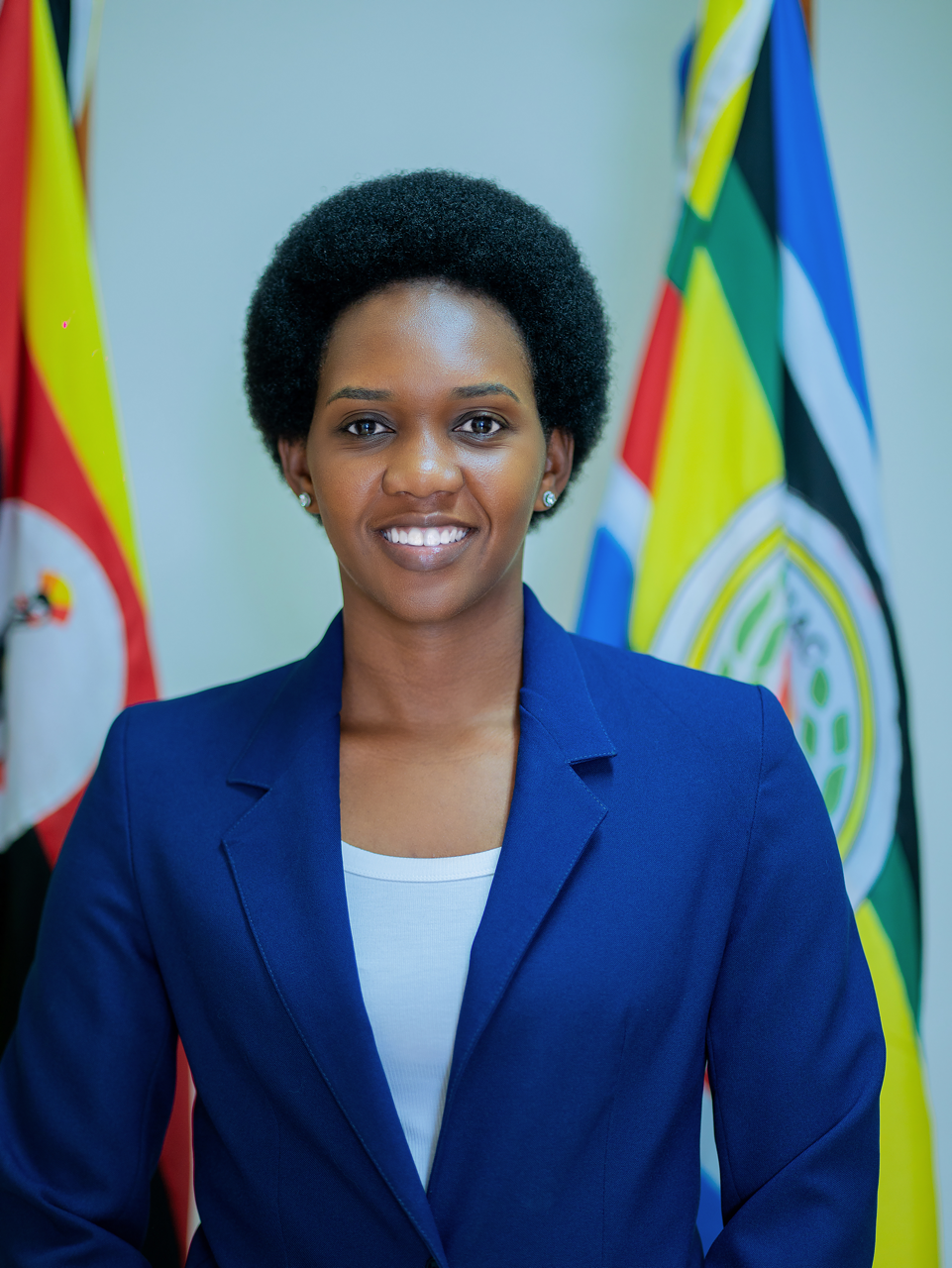
- Portrait of Hon. Phiona Nyamutoro

Minister of state for Minerals in the Ministry of Energy and Minerals Development

Woman Member of Parliament of Nebbi district

Personal details
- Born: 9 December 1993 (age 32) Uganda
- Citizenship: Uganda
- Party: National Resistance Movement
- Spouse: Edrisah Musuuza
- Children: 1
- Education: Makerere University

Phiona Nyamutoro (born 9 December 1993) is a Ugandan politician and legislator serving as the Woman Member of Parliament for Nebbi District in the twelfth (12th) parliament of Uganda. She was the National Female Youth Member of parliament in the eleventh parliament of Uganda. She is also the current Minister of state for Minerals in the Ministry of Energy and Minerals Development, to which she was appointed in March 2024. She is a member of the National Resistance Movement (NRM) on whose ticket she got to parliament.

== Early life and education ==
Nyamutoro was born on 9 December 1993 in Nebbi District. She went to Najjera Progressive for her primary education and later on joined Pallisa Secondary School for O-Level, before going to Bweyogerere SS for A-Level. She holds a first class Bachelor's degree in Development studies and a Master's degree in Public administration from Makerere university.

== Career ==
Nyamutoro was a vice guild president while at Makerere University 2015 to 2016.

She was also a member of the National Youth council representing Nebbi district. Nyamutoro is the first National youth Member of Parliament hailing from Nebbi district.

In the 11th parliament, she served as the Chairperson of the Parliamentary Forum on Youth Affairs, additionally she also served as a member of the committee on education and sports.

On 22 March 2024, Nyamutoro was appointed as the Minister of State for Mineral Development in the Ministry of Energy and Mineral Development where she is responsible for overseeing Uganda’s mineral resources and promoting sustainable development in the mining sector.

Nyamutoro was elected as the Woman Member of Parliament for Nebbi District during the 2026 elections. After she was re-appointed as the Minister of State for Energy and Mineral Development in charge of Minerals in the 2026-2031 Cabinet reshuffle .

== Personal life ==
She got engaged to Edrisah Musuuza on Saturday 29 June 2024 at a private traditional ceremony. The couple has a child.She welcomed her second child, a daughter with Edrisa Musuuza in May 2026.

== See also ==
- Parliament of Uganda
- National Resistance Movement
- Ministry of Energy and Mineral Development
- Nebbi District
- Youth in Uganda
