= Televiziona Malagasy =

National broadcaster of Madagascar

Televiziona Malagasy (abbreviated as TVM) is the national broadcaster of Madagascar, established in 1967. To ensure nation-wide coverage, it uses the EutelSat satellite at 16° East for transmission. The satellite is also used to transmit Radio Madagascar on FM radio at 99.00Mhz. From 1967 to 1991, it was known as Radio Television Malagasy, and from 1991 to 1999 as Television Nationale Malagasy. TVM broadcasts in Malagasy and French.

== History ==
Broadcasts started on 24 December 1967 through a station located in Antananarivo, and over the next years repeaters were installed in Ambatolampy, Antananarivo-East and Arivonimamo. It was founded by Philibert Tsiranana and its first director was Jean-Louis Rafidy On 28 December 1974 a new TV station opened on Antsiranana (then known as Diego Suárez).

Initially, the channel aired two hours a day, in black and white, color broadcasting started in 1977, followed by color television, and by the 2000s, 24/7 broadcasting. Its first news presenter was Gaby Rabesahala. Other pioneers included Louis Menard, Gisèle Rakotoarivony, François Rakotobe, Jacquie Andrianarisoa, Lucien Rajaonina, Robert Vidue, Jocelyn Rafidinarivo alias Jean Louis Rafidy, Gilles Boutiron, Roger Mullet, Paul Randrianarivelo, Pierre Raynal (early head of the station), Guy Bernède, Pascal Randriambololona, Jeanne Rasoarimalala alias Rasoabakobako, etc.

On 9 October 2006, the channel changed significantly, including a new logo, new programs and new locations for production. Consequently, TVM started broadcasting from new premises at Anosy, leaving its former facilities at the former Solima building in Antaninarenina behind.

TVM upgraded its studios and identity in 2022; for its 55th anniversary, in December 2022, the channel aired special programming, revisiting key historical moments and the return of former personalities.

In 2024, thanks to a partnership with the Japanese government, TVM received new state-of-the-art equipment, ORTM set up a new studio for the television news to accommodate this new equipment. On 30 September 2024, President Andry Rajoelina inaugurates the studio and new equipment.

In August 2025, as announced in February 2025, ORTM is launching a second TVM channel called "TVM2", the broadcast of which is carried out progressively: on subscription operators first and via terrestrial later, the channel was added to Canal+ Madagascar on 28 July.

TVM's owner ORTM has close ties to the ruling government; information on key aspects such as its budget are not publicly available.
