= Sitya Loss =

2014 single by Eddy Kenzo

Single by Eddy Kenzo

from the album Sitya Loss
- Released: 13 March 2014
- Genre: Afrobeat
- Songwriter(s): Eddy Kenzo

Eddy Kenzo singles chronology
""Stamina""	"Sitya Loss" (2014)	"Soraye" (2016)

Music video
- "Sitya Loss" on YouTube

"Sitya Loss Remix"

Single by Eddy Kenzo feat. Toofan

from the album Zero to Hero
- Released: November 2014 / March 2016
- Genre: Afrobeat
- Length: 3:32
- Label: Big Talent Records
- Songwriter(s): Davies Jonåh récords
- Producer(s): Davies Jonåh récords

"Sitya Loss" is a song by Eddy Kenzo and his most successful hit. It serves as a single from the eponymous album Sitya Loss, which was released in May 2014.

The remix of "Sitya Loss" features vocals by Togolese duo Toofan. Partially recorded in French, the song was released by Tubeland Records and included on the duo's 2014 album Overdose. Kenzo released a revamped version of "Sitya Loss" on Big Talent Records; the song also features vocals by Toofan and appeared on his follow-up album Zero to Hero (2016).

== Music video ==
"Sitya Loss" was released online as a music video on 13 March 2014 showing video footage of Ugandan youngsters from Makindye dancing to the song went viral. They are Alex Ssempijja, Fred Tumwesigye and Isaac Tumusiime, Bashir Lubega and Patricia Nabakooza. Later on grown-up participants and some musicians join in. It ends with the slogan "Born in Africa".

The video was made by Big Talent Entertainment and JahLive Films, was directed by Mugerwa Frank and edited by Muhumuza Martin with audio production by Diggy Baur from Sound Cover Rec.

In November 2015, Alex Sempijja, one of the young men featured dancing in the video was fatally wounded when riding a bicycle when its brakes failed and landed into a trench. Patricia Nabakoza who was accompanying him was injured in the incident.

== Reception ==
The song was nominated for Channel O Music Video Awards in 2014 for the "International Viewers' Choice Award".

The song was cited for Eddy Kenzo's win of "Viewer's Choice Award" during the Afro-Australia Music and Movie Awards (AAMMA) also in 2014 Kenzo also won the HiPipo Music Awards for category "Best Use of Social Media by Artist" mainly for his work on the "Sitya Loss" release. During the Rising Star Awards, "Sitya Loss" song won "Song and Video of the Year 2014/2015" Courtesy of this video, The Triplets Ghetto Kids bagged The Video Trailblazer Award at the HiPipo Music Awards.

Its success led to the launching of a petition to have the dancing children appear on The Ellen DeGeneres Show.
