= Eddy Kenzo =

Ugandan singer and music executive

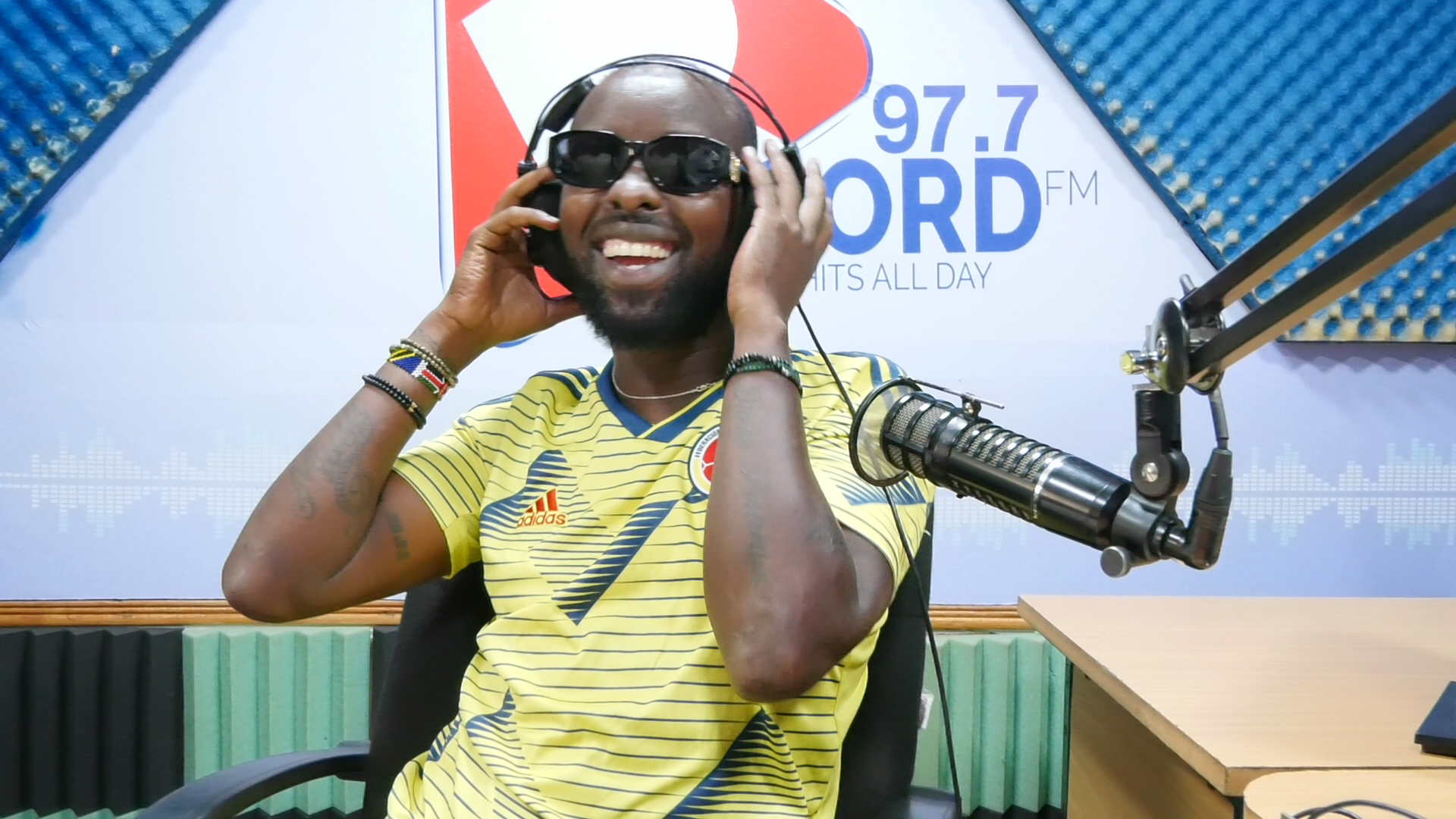
- Eddy Kenzo

Background information
- Also known as: Eddy Kenzo
- Born: Edrisah Kenzo Musuuza; 25 December 1989 (age 36); Masaka, Uganda
- Origin: Seguku, Wakiso
- Genres: Afropop; dancehall
- Occupations: Singer; music executive
- Instruments: Vocals; drums
- Years active: 2008–present
- Label: Big Talent
- Member of: Uganda National Musicians Federation
- Spouse: Phiona Nyamutoro (married 2024 - )
- Website: www.eddykenzo.com

Edrisah Kenzo Musuuzah, professionally known as Eddy Kenzo, is a Ugandan singer, music executive, and president and founder of the Uganda National Musicians Federation and a member of Big Talent Entertainment. He gained wider recognition following the release of his single "Stamina", which marked a breakthrough in his music career. He later attracted international attention through his subsequent musical releases. "Sitya Loss" in 2014 and an accompanying viral video that featured the Ghetto Kids. In total, he has released four albums, including Roots in 2018 and Made in Africa in 2021. Kenzo has also won a Nickelodeon Kids' Choice Award in 2018, a BET Award in 2015, and multiple All Africa Music Awards.

In 2022, Kenzo was nominated for a Grammy Award for Best Global Performance for "Gimme Love" (Matt B featuring Kenzo). The song peaked at number 36 on the Billboard U.S. Afrobeats Songs chart in November 2022. Matt B and Kenzo performed "Gimme Love" at the Eddy Kenzo Festival at Kololo Airstrip in Uganda to an audience of over 20,000, including Uganda's Prime Minister Robinah Nabbanja. Kenzo was the first Ugandan artist to win the BET Award in 2015 and the first Ugandan artist to be nominated for a Grammy award.

== Early life and education ==
Edrisah Musuuza was born in Masaka, Uganda. His mother died when he was about five years old, and he spent the following 13 years living largely on the streets of Masaka and Kampala. Initially, Kenzo aspired to be a professional footballer and joined Masaka Local Council FC's camp at the age of nine. He received a sports bursary while at Lubiri Secondary School in Kampala, but he didn't complete his studies.

Kenzo is naturally left-handed, but was constantly beaten by his foster family for eating with the left hand.

== Career ==
He began making music using his stage name, Eddy Kenzo, in 2008. That year, he released his first song, "Yanimba", with Mikie Wine. In 2010, he released another single, "Stamina". The song was used as a theme song by politicians during the 2011 Ugandan general election. At the Pearl of Africa Music Awards in 2011, Kenzo received the Best New Artist award. Kenzo also established his Big Talent Entertainment record label in 2011. He continues to serve as a member of that venture.

Kenzo continued releasing music in 2012. In 2013, he held his first concert at the Kyadondo Rugby Club that year in support of the track, "Kamunguluze". Kenzo's first major international breakthrough came with 2014's "Sitya Loss" and the accompanying album of the same name. A YouTube video featuring a group of Ugandan children known as the Ghetto Kids dancing to the song went viral after it was shared on social media by record executive Sean Combs in September 2014. As of March 2022, the video has accumulated nearly 42 million views on YouTube. Kenzo also started a petition to earn the children an appearance on The Ellen DeGeneres Show. After the release of "Sitya Loss" and the album of the same name, Kenzo went on a brief United States tour with dancehall musician, DeMarco.

In January 2015, Kenzo performed at the opening ceremonies of that year's Africa Cup of Nations in Equatorial Guinea alongside Akon. He also performed at the tournament final. Around that time, he produced a remix to his 2014 single, "Jambole", with a guest appearance from Nigerian singer, Kcee. In June 2015, Kenzo was honored with the BET Award for Viewer's Choice Best New International Artist. He was the first East African artist to win a BET Award. In July 2015, he performed at the KigaliUp Music Festival in Rwanda's capital. In October of that year, he released a remixed version of his song, "Mbilo Mbilo", featuring Nigerian singer, Niniola. The original version of that song later appeared on the soundtrack for the 2016 film Queen of Katwe.

In December 2015, Kenzo released the lead single, "Soraye", from his second album, Zero to Hero. In March 2016, he went on a tour Africa, with stops in Kenya, Ivory Coast, Mali, and others. Later that month, he released Zero to Hero. Throughout the remainder of 2016, Kenzo earned a writing credit on Jidenna's "Little Bit More", was featured on the Mi Casa single "Movie Star", and won an All Africa Music Award for his "Mbilo Mbilo" remix. He also went on another US tour late in the year. In May 2017, Kenzo was named the ambassador of the Kenyan Tourism Board and was appointed to a similar role in Uganda the following year.

In July 2017, Kenzo went on a European tour ahead of the release of his third studio album, Biology, a month later. The album featured guest appearances from artists like Mani Martin, Werrason, and Mi Casa, among others. It also featured the single "Jubilation", which had an accompanying music video that won the Best East African Music Video Award at the Zanzibar International Film Festival. He won awards at that year's All Africa Music Awards, including Best East African Male Artist. He later donated the award, along with his 2015 BET Award, to the Uganda Museum in Kampala.

In March 2018, Kenzo won a Nickelodeon Kids' Choice Award as the "Favorite African Star." In July 2018, he performed alongside Triplets Ghetto Kids at multiple African music festivals in Canada, including Afrofest in Toronto. He also performed at the One Africa Music Festival in Dubai later in the year. In October 2018, he released his fourth studio album, Roots, which featured the single "Body Language". Kenzo also announced a 10-year anniversary concert in celebration of his time as a musical artist. The concert took place on 4 January 2019 in the Victoria ballroom of the Serena Hotel in Kampala. Leading up to the concert, Kenzo released a new music video each week for a song from Roots for two months.

In March 2019, it was announced that Kenzo would be featured alongside Triplets Ghetto Kids in an upcoming music video for American singer Chris Brown's "Back to Love". In April 2019, Kenzo released the single, "Signal" with an accompanying music video.

Kenzo followed up with the 2021 studio album Made in Africa featuring Hunter Nation from Tanzania for the hit love song "SoulMate".

In 2022, Kenzo collaborated with US musician Matt B on "Gimme Love". The song entered the Billboard US Afrobeats Songs at number 49 in October and peaked at number 36 in November that year. He and Matt B were nominated for the Grammy Award for Best Global Music Performance at the 65th Annual Grammy Awards for the song. The nomination made Kenzo the first Ugandan musician working and living in Uganda to receive a Grammy nomination.

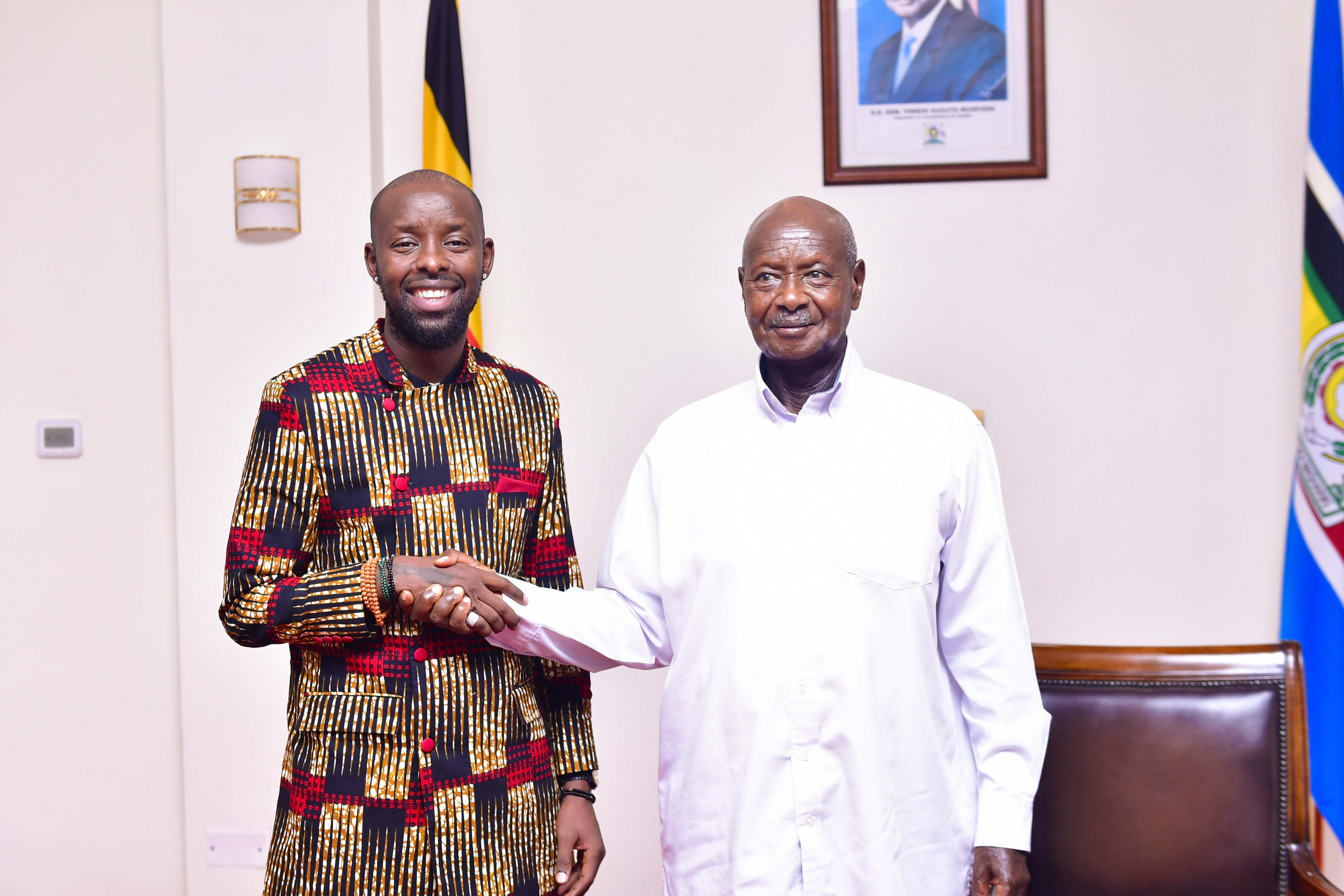
Kenzo shaking hands with Yoweri Museveni

On 22 August 2024, Kenzo was appointed as the senior presidential adviser on Creatives by President Yoweri Museveni. This role involves advising on matters related to the creative industry, which includes music, performing arts, and other creative sectors. Kenzo’s appointment is seen as a significant step towards bolstering the creative industry in Uganda, which has been seeking more governmental support and recognition.

His appointment followed a meeting with President Museveni and other musicians at State House Entebbe. He became one of more than 160 presidential advisers.

In 2025, Kenzo received a nomination for the Grammy Award for Best African Music Performance for "Hope & Love" with Mehran Matin.

== Philanthropy ==
In 2015, Kenzo launched the charitable organization Eddy Kenzo Foundation. In January 2016, he enlisted Ugandan footballers, Tony Mawejje and Vincent Kayizzi, to help donate goods to nursing mothers and staff at the local Masaka hospital. In July 2017, he hosted two charity football matches in Masaka and Kampala that featured Victor Wanyama. The event raised funds for Ugandan children with HIV. In March 2019, he opened the Big Talent Soccer Academy in Kampala. The academy identifies local youth talent and provides education to help foster their skills.

== Concerts ==
On November 12, 2022, Kenzo hosted the Eddy Kenzo Festival at the Kololo Airstrip in Kampala. The event featured several local and international guest performers.

On January 4, 2019, Kenzo commemorated his 10-year anniversary in the Ugandan music industry with the concert "10 Years of Eddy Kenzo." The event aimed to foster unity between two of Uganda's prominent musicians and political figures, Bobi Wine and Bebe Cool, who have had a longstanding feud.

== Personal life ==
Kenzo began a romantic relationship with Ugandan recording artist Rema Namakula. On 26 December 2014, they had a daughter at Paragon Hospital, in the Kampala neighborhood of Bugolobi. Kenzo, who has another daughter (Maya Musuuza) from a previous relationship, acknowledged he was the father and named the newborn Aamaal Musuuza.

Kenzo and Rema separated in mid-2019, and Rema got engaged to her former doctor, Hamza Ssebunya.

In early 2024, Kenzo appeared in photographs with Phiona Nyamutoro during her inauguration ceremony, after being appointed a State Minister of Energy by President Museveni. On 29th June 2024, Kenzo made the union with Phiona Nyamutoro official with a traditional introduction ceremony that was held in Buziga, a suburb in Kampala.

=== Studio albums ===
List of studio albums with selected details
Title	Details
Sitya Loss	Released: 8 May 2014; Label: Big Talent Entertainment; Formats: digital download
Zero to Hero	Released: 21 March 2016; Label: Big Talent Entertainment; Formats: digital download
Biology	Released: 11 August 2017; Label: Big Talent Entertainment; Formats: digital download
Roots	Released: 18 October 2018; Label: Big Talent Entertainment; Formats: digital download
Made in Africa	Released: 29 April 2021; Label: Big Talent Entertainment; Formats: digital download
Blessings	Released: 20 August 2023; Label: Big Talent Entertainment; Formats: digital download

=== Singles ===
Title	Year	Album
"Yanimba" (feat. Mikie Wine)	2008	Non-album single
"Stamina"	2010	Non-album single
"Sitya Loss"	2014	Sitya Loss
"Jambole"	2014	Sitya Loss
"Mbilo Mbilo"	2015	Zero to Hero
"Soraye"	2015	Zero to Hero
"Dagala"	2016	Non-album single
"So Good"	2016	Non-album single
"Zigido"	2016	Non-album single
"Jubilation"	2017	Biology
"Body Language"	2018	Roots
"Signal"	2019	Non-album single
"Inabana" (with Harmonize)	2019	Non-album single
"Semyekozo"	2020	Non-album single
"Tweyagale"	2020	Non-album single
"Sonko"	2020	Non-album single
"Yogera Bulungi"	2020	Non-album single
"Hope & Love" (with Mehran Matin)	2025	Non-album single

== Awards and nominations ==
Year	Award	Category	Nominee(s)	Result	Ref.
2011	Pearl of Africa Music Awards	Best New Artist	Eddy Kenzo	Won	
2014	Africa Muzik Magazine Awards	Best Newcomer	Eddy Kenzo	Nominated	
2014	Channel O Music Video Awards	Most Gifted (East Africa)	Eddy Kenzo for "Sitya Loss"	Nominated	
2015	Black Canadian Awards	Best International Act	Eddy Kenzo	Nominated	
2015	Afroca Music Awards	Best Revelation Award	Eddy Kenzo	Nominated	
2015	BET Awards	Viewer's Choice Best New International Artist	Eddy Kenzo	Won	
2015	HiPipo Music Awards	Best Use of Social Media	Eddy Kenzo	Won	
2016	MTV Africa Music Awards	Best Live Act	Eddy Kenzo	Nominated	
2016	All Africa Music Awards	Best African Collaboration	Eddy Kenzo and Niniola for "Mbilo Mbilo (remix)"	Won	
2017	Zanzibar International Film Festival	Best East African Music Video Award	Music video for "Jubilation"	Won	
2017	TUMA Music Awards	Artist of the Year	Eddy Kenzo	Won	
2017	TUMA Music Awards	Best Male Artist	Eddy Kenzo	Won	
2017	All Africa Music Awards	Best East African Male Artist	Eddy Kenzo	Won	
2017	All Africa Music Awards	Song of the Year	"Shauri Yako"	Won	
2018	Nickelodeon Kids' Choice Awards	Favorite African Star	Eddy Kenzo	Won	
2018	International Reggae and World Music Awards	Best African Entertainer	Eddy Kenzo	Won	
2018	African Muzik Magazine Awards	East African Artist of the Year	Eddy Kenzo	Won	
	Hollywood African Prestigious Awards	Best African International Artist	Eddy Kenzo	Won	
2022 to 2023	Grammy Awards	Best Global Performance	Eddy Kenzo	Nominated	
2025	Grammy Awards	Best African Music Performance	Eddy Kenzo and Mehran Matin	Nominated	
