= PS 22 =

Elementary school in New York City

Coordinates: 40.625019°N 74.150643°W

PS 22 is a public elementary school in Graniteville, Staten Island, New York City. Located at 1860 Forest Avenue, Staten Island, NY 10303, the school has over one thousand students in grades Pre-K to K-5 and has a dual language program. PS 22 is the largest elementary school in Staten Island which draws students from a wide cross section of ethnic groups and socio-economic levels.

The school has become famous for its PS22 Chorus program founded in 2000 by the school's music teacher, Gregg Breinberg. The choir has become an internet phenomenon with New York magazine calling it "the best-known elementary-school chorus on the planet".
