= Thousand Foot Krutch discography =

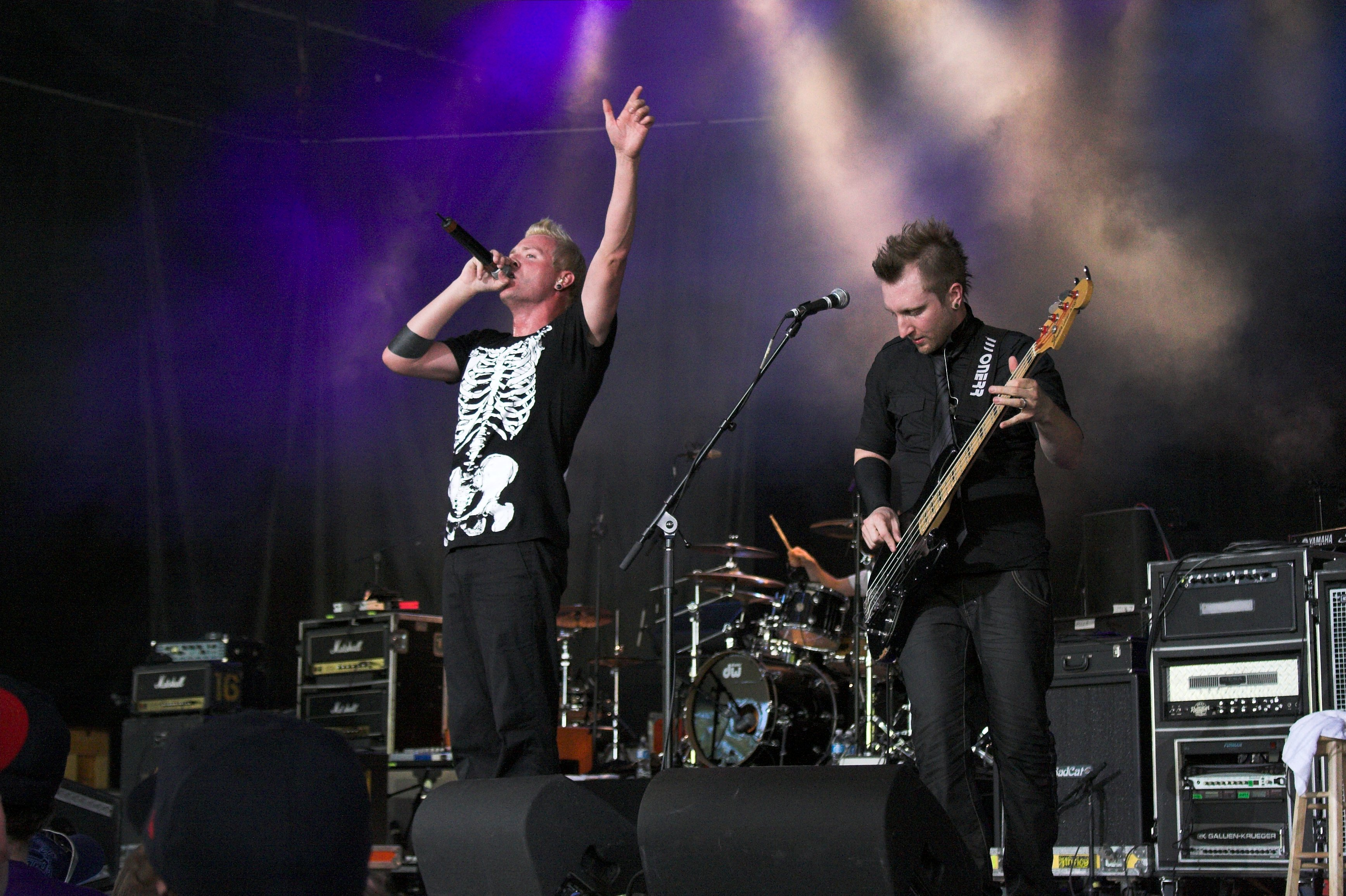
- Thousand Foot Krutch performing at Wonder Jam 2009.
- Studio albums: 10
- Extended plays: 3
- Live albums: 2
- Compilation albums: 2
- Singles: 39
- Music videos: 7

The following is the discography of Thousand Foot Krutch, a Canadian Christian rock band. The band has released ten studio albums to date, four of which were released through Tooth & Nail Records, with whom the band was signed to from 2002 to 2011. When originally formed, the band created a mix of nu metal and rapcore, but in recent years has begun to create a mix of hard rock and alternative rock.

== Albums ==
=== Studio albums ===
Title	Details	Peak chart positions						Sales	Certifications (sales threshold)
Title	Details	CAN	US	US Christ	US Rock	US Alt	UK C&G	Sales	Certifications (sales threshold)
That's What People Do	Released: July 29, 1997; Label: Independent; Format: CD	—	—	—	—	—	—		
Set It Off	Released: April 14, 2000; Label: DJD Entertainment Group; Format: CD, DL	—	—	40	—	—	—		
Phenomenon	Released: September 30, 2003; Label: Tooth & Nail Records; Format: CD, DL, Cassette	—	— (Note: Phenomenon did not enter the Billboard 200, but peaked at No. 18 on the Billboard Top Heatseekers)	15	—	—	—		
The Art of Breaking	Released: July 19, 2005; Label: Tooth & Nail; Format: CD, DL	—	67	2	—	—	—		
The Flame in All of Us	Released: September 18, 2007; Label: Tooth & Nail; Format: CD, DL	—	58	2	16	17	—		
Welcome to the Masquerade	Released: September 8, 2009; Label: Tooth & Nail; Format: CD, DL	—	35	2	13	8	—		
The End is Where We Begin	Released: April 17, 2012; Label: Independent; Format: CD, DL, LP	28	14	1	7	3	8	US: 23,000	
OXYGEN: INHALE	Released: August 26, 2014; Label: Independent; Format: CD, DL, LP	8	11	1	2	—	6		
EXHALE	Released: June 17, 2016; Label: Independent; Format: CD, DL	54	34	1	6	—	3	US: 14,000	
"—" denotes a release that did not chart.

=== As Oddball ===
Year	Album details
1995	Shutterbug: Released: May 3, 1995; Label: Independent

=== Other albums ===
Title	Details	Peak chart positions	Sales	Certifications (sales threshold)
Title	Details	US Christ	Sales	Certifications (sales threshold)
Live at the Masquerade	Released: June 7, 2011; Label: Tooth & Nail; Format: CD, DL	18		
TFK Remixes EP	Released: October 1, 2012; Label: Independent; Format: CD, DL	—		
Metamorphosiz: The End Remixes Vol. 1	Released: December 4, 2012; Label: Independent; Format: CD, DL	—		
Metamorphosiz: The End Remixes Vol. 2	Released: July 2, 2013; Label: Independent; Format: CD, DL	—		
Made in Canada: The 1998-2010 Collection	Released: October 15, 2013; Label: Tooth & Nail; Format: CD, DL	—		
Metamorphosiz: The End Remixes Vol. 1 & 2	Released: November 19, 2013; Label: TFK; Format: CD, DL	—		
Thousand Foot Krutch: The Ultimate Collection	Released: November 10, 2014; Label: Capitol CMG; Format: CD, DL	—		
Winter Jam EP	Released: January 8, 2017; Label: Independent; Format: CD, DL	—		
Untraveled Roads	Released: September 15, 2017; Label: The Fuel Music; Format: CD, DL	—		

== Singles ==
Title	Year	Peak chart positions						Certifications (sales threshold)	Album
Title	Year	US Main	US Rock	US Active Rock	US Christ	US Christ Rock	UK Rock	Certifications (sales threshold)	Album
"Lift It"	1995	—	—	—	—	—	—		Shutterbug
"Brother John"	1997	—	3	—	—	—	—		That's What People Do
"Small Town"	1999	—	—	—	—	—	—		That's What People Do
"Set It Off"	2001	—	—	—	—	—	—		Set It Off
"Rhime Animal"	2003	—	—	—	—	—	—		Set It Off
"Puppet"	2003	—	—	—	—	—	—		Set It Off
"Supafly"	2003	—	—	—	—	—	—		Set It Off
"Unbelievable"	2003	—	—	—	—	—	—		Set It Off
"Phenomenon"	2004	—	—	37	—	—	—		Phenomenon
"Rawkfist"	2004	28	—	23	—	—	—		Phenomenon
"Bounce"	2004	—	—	—	—	—	—		Phenomenon
"This Is a Call"	2004	—	—	—	—	—	—		Phenomenon
"Absolute"	2005	34	—	—	—	—	—		The Art of Breaking
"Move"	2005	16	—	—	—	—	—		The Art of Breaking
"The Art of Breaking"	2006	—	—	—	—	—	—		The Art of Breaking
"Breathe You In"	2006	—	—	—	15	11	—		The Art of Breaking
"What Do We Know"	2007	—	—	—	27	—	—		The Flame In All of Us
"Falls Apart"	2007	34	—	—	—	1	—		The Flame In All of Us
"The Flame In All of Us"	2008	—	4	—	—	2	—		The Flame In All of Us
"Favorite Disease"	2008	—	—	—	—	25	—		The Flame In All of Us
"Bring Me to Life"	2009	—	—	—	—	1	—		Welcome to the Masquerade
"Forward Motion"	2009	—	—	—	42	—	—		Welcome to the Masquerade
"Fire It Up"	2009	18	35	—	—	1	—		Welcome to the Masquerade
"Already Home"	2010	—	—	—	35	—	—		Welcome to the Masquerade
'E for Extinction"	2010	—	—	—	—	1	—		Welcome to the Masquerade
"Look Away"	2010	—	—	—	39	—	—		Welcome to the Masquerade
"Shook"	2011	—	—	—	26	1	—		Welcome to the Masquerade: Fan Edition
"War of Change"	2012	—	44	36	—	1	21	RIAA: Gold	The End Is Where We Begin
"Let the Sparks Fly"	2012	37	45	37	—	22	—		The End Is Where We Begin
"Light Up the Sky"	2013	—	34	49	—	1	—		The End Is Where We Begin
"Born This Way"	2014	22	—	—	26	1	—		OXYGEN:INHALE
"Untraveled Road"	2014	19	22	19	25	1	—		OXYGEN:INHALE
"In My Room"	2015	—	—	—	11	17	—		OXYGEN:INHALE
"Born Again"	2015	—	—	—	11	—	—		EXHALE
"Running With Giants"	2016	24	21	—	—	21	—		EXHALE
"Give Up the Ghost"	2016	—	33	—	20	—	—		EXHALE
"Push"	2016	29	—	—	—	14	—		EXHALE
"Adrenaline"	2016	—	—	—	—	—	—		EXHALE
"Lifeline"	2016	—	—	—	—	—	—		EXHALE
"UNPARALYZED" (with Caleb Hyles)	2024	—	—	—	—	—	—		The Darkness Before the Dawn
"Euphoria"	2024	—	—	—	—	— (Note: "Euphoria" did not enter the Billboard Christian Rock due to the chart being discontinued in 2019, but peaked at No. 9 on ChristianRock.net)	—		Non-album single
"Cope" (Saliva with Trevor McNevan)	2026	—	—	—	—	—	—		Breaking Through
"—" denotes a recording that did not chart or was not released in that territory.

=== Other charted and certified songs ===
Title	Year	Certifications (sales threshold)	Album
"Courtesy Call"	2012	RIAA: Platinum; RMNZ: Gold	The End is Where We Begin

== Music videos ==
Song	Album
"Puppet"	Set It Off
"Rawkfist"	Phenomenon
"Move"	The Art of Breaking
"Falls Apart"	The Flame In All of Us
"Favorite Disease"	The Flame In All of Us
"War of Change"	The End Is Where We Begin
"Running with Giants"	Exhale
"Euphoria"	Non-album single

== Compilation appearances ==
Year	Album	Song(s)	Label
2000	History of Canadian Christian New Music	"Small Town"	
2004	X 2004	"Rawkfist"	Tooth & Nail Records
2005	X 2005	"Everyone Like Me"	Tooth & Nail Records
2006	X 2006	"Move"	Tooth & Nail Records
2006	27th Annual Covenant Hits	"Absolute"	CMC Distribution
2007	X 2007	"Absolute"	Tooth & Nail Records
2008	The Ultimate Collection: Tooth & Nail Records	"Rawkfist"	Tooth & Nail Records
2008	X 2008	"Falls Apart"	Tooth & Nail Records
2008	Canada Rocks	"What Do We Know?"	CMC Distribution
2008	GMA Canada presents 30th Anniversary Collection	"Rawkfist"	CMC Distribution
2008	X Christmas	"Jingle Bell Rock"	BEC Recordings
2009	X 2009	"The Flame In All of Us"	Tooth & Nail Records
2009	Songs From The Penalty Box, Tooth & Nail Volume 6	"The Flame In All Of Us"	Tooth & Nail Records
2010	Christian Radio #1 Hits	"What Do We Know"	Star Song Music / Chordant
2010	X 2010	"Fire It Up"	Tooth & Nail Records
2010	Happy Christmas Vol. 5	"Heat Miser"	Tooth & Nail Records
