= Live at the Masquerade =

Live album by Thousand Foot Krutch
- Released: June 3, 2011
- Recorded: Rexall Place, Edmonton, Alberta, Canada; May 28, 2010
- Genre: Christian rock; Christian metal; nu metal; hard rock; rap metal
- Length: 51:51
- Label: Tooth & Nail
- Producer: Thousand Foot Krutch

Thousand Foot Krutch chronology
Welcome to the Masquerade (2009)	Live at the Masquerade (2011)	The End Is Where We Begin (2012)

Professional ratings
Review scores
Source	Rating
Cross Rhythms	9/10 squares
Jesusfreakhideout.com	4.5/5 stars 4/5 stars

Live at the Masquerade is a live CD/DVD combination released by Thousand Foot Krutch. The CD/DVD includes live recordings of many of their songs such as "Puppet", "What Do We Know", "Absolute", "Rawkfist", and several songs of their previous album Welcome to the Masquerade.

== Track listing ==
No.	Title	Original studio recording on	Length
1.	"Welcome to the Masquerade" (Contains an introduction for the band and 'The Invitation' extended)	Welcome to the Masquerade	6:02
2.	"Bring Me to Life"	Welcome to the Masquerade	3:39
3.	"Move"	The Art of Breaking	3:09
4.	"Absolute"	The Art of Breaking	3:22
5.	"The Flame In All of Us"	The Flame in All of Us	3:25
6.	"Trevor Talks to Crowd" (Spoken Track)	—	1:24
7.	"E for Extinction"	Welcome to the Masquerade	4:09
8.	"Scream"	Welcome to the Masquerade	3:30
9.	"What Do We Know"	The Flame in All of Us	3:24
10.	"Falls Apart"	The Flame in All of Us	3:37
11.	"Rawkfist"	Phenomenon	2:52
12.	"Fire It Up"	Welcome to the Masquerade	3:38
13.	"Already Home"	Welcome to the Masquerade	4:26
14.	"Puppet"	Set It Off	5:22
Total length:			51:51

== Personnel ==
- Trevor McNevan - vocals
- Steve Augustine - drums
- Joel Bruyere - bass, backing vocals
- Nick Baumhardt - keyboards
- Mastered By: Troy Glessner
