= Untraveled Roads =

Live album by Thousand Foot Krutch
- Released: September 15, 2017
- Recorded: February 3, 2017
- Venue: Bridgestone Arena (Nashville, TN)
- Genre: Christian rock; Christian metal; hard rock; nu metal
- Length: 48:05
- Label: TFK Music Inc.; The Fuel Music
- Producer: Thousand Foot Krutch

Thousand Foot Krutch chronology
Exhale (2016)	Untraveled Roads (2017)

Professional ratings
Review scores
Source	Rating
Jesusfreakhideout.com	4/5 stars

Untraveled Roads is the second live album released by Thousand Foot Krutch. The album includes live recordings of 'eight of the band's last nine Active Rock radio singles, including "Courtesy Call," "Running With Giants," "War of Change," "Push," "Let the Sparks Fly," "Born This Way," "Light Up the Sky" and the title track, "Untraveled Road," which TFK unveiled as the first live-in-concert video from the project.' It was recorded on February 3, 2017 during the 2017 Winter Jam Tour.

== Track listing ==
No.	Title	Original studio recording on	Length
1.	"Running With Giants"	Exhale	4:43
2.	"Light Up the Sky"	The End Is Where We Begin	4:22
3.	"The River"	Exhale	3:22
4.	"Push"	Exhale	4:12
5.	"Untraveled Road"	Oxygen: Inhale	3:56
6.	"Let the Sparks Fly"	The End Is Where We Begin	4:45
7.	"Born This Way"	Oxygen: Inhale	3:14
8.	"Courtesy Call"	The End Is Where We Begin	5:00
9.	"Be Somebody"	The End Is Where We Begin	3:38
10.	"War of Change"	The End Is Where We Begin	3:46
11.	"The End Is Where We Begin"	The End Is Where We Begin	3:43
12.	"A Different Kind of Dynamite"	Exhale	3:24
Total length:			48:05

== Personnel ==
- Trevor McNevan - vocals
- Steve Augustine - drums
- Joel Bruyere - bass, backing vocals
- Andrew Welch - guitar, backing vocals
- Mixed by: J. R. McNeely
- Mastered by: Brad Blackwood
