= 1984–85 Inter Milan season =

Inter Milan
1984–85 season
- Chairman: Ernesto Pellegrini
- Manager: Ilario Castagner
- Serie A: 3rd
- Coppa Italia: Semi-finals
- UEFA Cup: Semi-finals
- Top goalscorer: League: Alessandro Altobelli (17); All: Alessandro Altobelli (25)
Home colours	Away colours
- All statistics correct as of 26 June 1985.

== Season ==
Inter purchased Karl-Heinz Rummenigge, a striker well known for his physical skills and the regularity in scoring. The other foreign was Liam Brady, former Juventus player. The German – who declared to have chosen the Italian league it was the most difficult step of his career – partnered with Alessandro Altobelli, resulting in a notable number of goals. Before the Christmas break, Inter had reached the quarter-finals of the UEFA Cup and was second in Serie A behind an underdog opponent, Hellas Verona.

However, when the path became to get harder, the side did not manage to meet the expectations. In the semi-finals of European cup, they went out to Real Madrid despite a 2–0 win in the first leg: the Spanish team was able – in the second leg – to reach a 3–0 success, leaving Inter to complain for a glass bead that hit Bergomi on head. The season ended in a third place outcome, behind Hellas Verona and Torino. Inter had a gap of five points from first place.

== Squad ==
Note: Flags indicate national team as defined under FIFA eligibility rules; some limited exceptions apply. Players may hold more than one non-FIFA nationality.

No.	Pos.	Nation	Player
—	GK	ITA	Walter Zenga
—	GK	ITA	Angelo Recchi
—	GK	ITA	Valerio Montagna
—	DF	ITA	Giuseppe Bergomi
—	DF	ITA	Giuseppe Baresi
—	DF	ITA	Riccardo Ferri
—	DF	ITA	Fulvio Collovati
—	DF	ITA	Graziano Bini
—	DF	ITA	Andrea Mandorlini
—	DF	ITA	Luca Meazza
—	MF	ITA	Enrico Cucchi

No.	Pos.	Nation	Player
—	MF	ITA	Giampiero Marini
—	MF	ITA	Franco Causio
—	MF	ITA	Giancarlo Pasinato
—	MF	IRL	Liam Brady
—	MF	ITA	Luigi Rocca
—	MF	ITA	Antonio Sabato
—	FW	ITA	Alessandro Altobelli
—	FW	FRG	Karl-Heinz Rummenigge
—	FW	ITA	Carlo Muraro
—	FW	ITA	Massimo Pellegrini
—	FW	ITA	Amerigo Paradiso

=== Transfers ===
In
Pos.	Name	from	Type
FW	Karl-Heinz Rummenigge	Bayern München	-
MF	Liam Brady	Sampdoria	
MF	Franco Causio	Udinese	
MF	Andrea Mandorlini	Ascoli Calcio	
GK	Valerio Montagna	Pavia	-

Out
Pos.	Name	To	Type
GK	Fabrizio Lorieri	Piacenza	-
MF	Evaristo Beccalossi	Sampdoria	
MF	Ludo Coeck	Ascoli Calcio	loan
MF	Hansi Müller	Como	
FW	Aldo Serena	Torino	co-ownership
MF	Salvatore Bagni	SSC Napoli	
MF	Juary	US Cremonese	loan

== Competitions ==
=== Serie A ===
==== League table ====
Pos	Team	Pld	W	D	L	GF	GA	GD	Pts	Qualification or relegation
1	Hellas Verona (C)	30	15	13	2	42	19	+23	43	Qualification to European Cup
2	Torino	30	14	11	5	36	22	+14	39	Qualification to UEFA Cup
3	Internazionale	30	13	12	5	42	28	+14	38	Qualification to UEFA Cup
4	Sampdoria	30	12	13	5	36	21	+15	37	Qualification to Cup Winners' Cup
5	Milan	30	12	12	6	31	25	+6	36 (Note: Position defined by head-to-head points: Milan: 3 pts; Juventus: 1 pt.)	Qualification to UEFA Cup

Source: RSSSF.com
Rules for classification: 1) Points; 2) Head-to-head points; 3) Head-to-head goal difference; 4) Goal difference; 5) Goals scored; 6) Draw. (Note: Head-to-head record is used only after all the matches between the teams in question have been played).
(C) Champions

==== Results by round ====
Round	1	2	3	4	5	6	7	8	9	10	11	12	13	14	15	16	17	18	19	20	21	22	23	24	25	26	27	28	29	30
Ground	A	H	A	H	A	H	A	H	H	A	H	A	H	H	A	H	A	H	A	H	A	H	A	A	H	A	H	A	A	H
Result	D	W	D	D	D	W	L	W	W	D	W	W	W	D	D	W	D	W	D	D	D	D	L	L	W	L	W	W	L	W
Position	5	2	3	5	5	3	5	4	3	4	3	3	2	2	2	1	2	2	2	2	2	2	2	2	2	5	3	2	3	3

Source: http://calcio-seriea.net/allenatori_squadra/1984/903/
A = Away; H = Home; W = Win; D = Draw; L = Loss; = 1985–86 European Cup; = 1985–86 UEFA Cup Following UEFA ranking changes and the English ban, Italy gained a third berth.

==== Matches ====
16 September 1984 1	Atalanta	1–1	Inter Milan	Bergamo
	Osti 48'	Report	Muraro 8'	Stadium: Atleti Azzurri d'Italia

23 September 1984 2	Inter Milan	2–1	Avellino	Milan
	Altobelli 54' (pen.); Pasinato 82'	Report	Díaz 42'	Stadium: Giuseppe Meazza

30 September 1984 3	Lazio	1–1	Inter Milan	Rome
	Giordano 27'	Report	Altobelli 33'	Stadium: Olimpico

7 October 1984 4	Inter Milan	0–0	Verona	Milan
		Report		Stadium: San Siro

14 October 1984 5	Torino	1–1	Inter Milan	Turin
	Serena 56'	Report	Bergomi 21'	Stadium: Comunale

21 October 1984 6	Inter Milan	1–0	Como	Milan
	Altobelli 42'	Report		Stadium: Giuseppe Meazza

28 October 1984 7	AC Milan	2–1	Inter Milan	Milan
	Di Bartolomei 33'; Hateley 63'	Report	Altobelli 10'	Stadium: San Siro

11 November 1984 8	Inter Milan	4–0	Juventus	Milan
	Rummenigge 12', 88'; Ferri 32'; Collovati 75'	Report		Stadium: Giuseppe Meazza

18 November 1984 9	Inter Milan	1–0	Udinese	Milan
	Galparoli 2' (o.g.)	Report		Stadium: Giuseppe Meazza

25 November 1984 10	Fiorentina	1–1	Inter Milan	Florence
	Monelli 30'	Report	Marini 44'	Stadium: Comunale

2 December 1984 11	Inter Milan	2–1	Napoli	Milan
	Rummenigge 62'; Altobelli 88'	Report	Caffarelli 47'	Stadium: Giuseppe Meazza

16 December 1984 12	Cremonese	1–2	Inter Milan	Cremona
	Nicoletti 87'	Report	Brady 5'; Altobelli 37'

23 December 1984 13	Inter Milan	2–0	Sampdoria	Milan
	Altobelli 9'; Rummenigge 82'	Report		Stadium: Giuseppe Meazza

6 January 1985 14	Inter Milan	0–0	Roma	Milan
		Report		Stadium: Giuseppe Meazza

13 January 1985 15	Ascoli	1–1	Inter Milan	Ascoli Piceno
	Iachini 76'	Report	Altobelli 49'	Stadium: Cino e Lillo de Luca

20 January 1985 16	Inter Milan	1–0	Atalanta	Milan
	Sabato 44'	Report		Stadium: Giuseppe Meazza

27 January 1985 17	Avellino	0–0	Inter Milan	Avellino
		Report

10 February 1985 18	Inter Milan	1–0	Lazio	Milan
	Marini 84'	Report		Stadium: Giuseppe Meazza

17 February 1985 19	Hellas Verona	1–1	Inter Milan	Verona
	Briegel 48'	Report	Altobelli 39'

24 February 1985 20	Inter Milan	1–1	Torino	Milan
	Collovati 28'	Report	Corradini 13'	Stadium: Giuseppe Meazza

3 March 1985 21	Como	0–0	Inter Milan	Como
		Report

17 March 1985 22	Inter Milan	2–2	AC Milan	Milan
	Rummenigge 48'; Altobelli 81'	Report	Virdis 22'; Verza 85'	Stadium: Giuseppe Meazza

24 March 1985 23	Juventus	3–1	Inter Milan	Turin
	Tardelli 40'; Boniek 62'; Briaschi 87'	Report	Altobelli 38'	Stadium: Comunale

31 March 1985 24	Udinese	2–1	Inter Milan	Udine
	Zico 38'; Miano 69'	Report	Altobelli 3'	Stadium: Friuli

14 April 1985 25	Inter Milan	1–0	Fiorentina	Milan
	Rummenigge 40'	Report		Stadium: Giuseppe Meazza

21 April 1985 26	Napoli	3–1	Inter Milan	Naples
	Bertoni 18', 63'; Dal Fiume 50'	Report	Bergomi 39'	Stadium: San Paolo

28 April 1985 27	Inter Milan	2–0	Cremonese	Milan
	Bencina 9' (o.g.); Altobelli 57' (pen.)	Report		Stadium: Giuseppe Meazza

5 May 1985 28	Sampdoria	1–2	Inter Milan	Genoa
	Scanziani 81'	Report	Brady 40' (pen.); Altobelli 65'	Stadium: Luigi Ferraris

12 May 1985 29	Roma	4–3	Inter Milan	Rome
	Ancelotti 25'; Conti 38'; Giannini 49'; Pruzzo 51'	Report	Oddi 28' (o.g.); Rummenigge 59'; Altobelli 65'	Stadium: Olimpico

19 May 1985 30	Inter Milan	5–1	Ascoli	Milan
	Marini 43'; Altobelli 45' (pen.), 84'; Bergomi 75'; Rummenigge 82'	Report	Cantarutti 48'	Stadium: Giuseppe Meazza

=== Coppa Italia ===
Group 2

Pos	Team	Pld	W	D	L	GF	GA	GD	Pts
1	Internazionale	5	4	1	0	9	1	+8	9
2	Pisa	5	2	3	0	9	5	+4	7
3	Avellino	5	2	2	1	4	4	0	6
4	Bologna	5	1	2	2	4	5	−1	4
5	Francavilla	5	0	2	3	5	9	−4	2
6	SPAL	5	0	2	3	4	11	−7	2

Eightfinals

13 February 1985	Empoli	0–1	Inter Milan	Empoli

27 February 1985	Inter Milan	1–0	Empoli	Milan

Quarterfinals

12 June 1985	Hellas Verona	3–0	Inter Milan	Verona

19 June 1985	Inter Milan	5–1 (a.e.t.) (5–4 agg.)	Hellas Verona	Milan
				Stadium: Giuseppe Meazza

Semifinals

23 June 1985	Inter Milan	1–2	AC Milan	Milan
				Stadium: Giuseppe Meazza

26 June 1985	AC Milan	1–1 (3–2 agg.)	Inter Milan	Milan
				Stadium: San Siro

=== UEFA Cup ===
First Round

20 September 1984	(Romania) Sportul Studenţesc	1–0	Inter Milan	Bucharest
	Sandu 84'			Stadium: Aurica Radulescu; Referee: (Spain) Castillo

3 October 1984	Inter Milan	2–0	(Romania) Sportul Studenţesc	Milan
	Brady 68'; Rummenigge 84'			Stadium: Giuseppe Meazza; Attendance: 52 600; Referee: (Sweden) Fredriksson

Second round

24 October 1984	Inter Milan	3–0	(Scotland) Rangers	Milan
	Sabato 17'; Causio 67'; Rummenigge 87'			Stadium: Giuseppe Meazza; Attendance: 65 591; Referee: (Germany) Roth

7 November 1984	(Scotland) Rangers	3–1	Inter Milan	Glasgow
	Mitchell 5'; Ferguson 16' 55'		15' Altobelli	Stadium: Ibrox; Attendance: 30 000; Referee: (Slovakia) Christov

Eightfinals

28 November 1984	(Germany) Hamburg	2–1	Inter Milan	Hamburg
	(Switzerland) Schröder 2' von Heesen 80'		47' Rummenigge	Stadium: Volksparkstadion; Attendance: 62 000; Referee: Daina

12 December 1984	Inter Milan	1–0	(Germany) Hamburg	Milan
	Brady 78' (pen.)			Stadium: Giuseppe Meazza; Attendance: 78 398; Referee: (England) Hackett

Quarterfinals

6 March 1985	Inter Milan	1–0	(Germany) FC Köln	Milan
	Causio 55'			Stadium: Giuseppe Meazza; Referee: (France) Wurtz

20 March 1985	(Germany) FC Köln	1–3	Inter Milan	Köln
	Bein 64'		17' Marini; 75' 83' Rummenigge	Stadium: Müngersdorfer Stadion; Referee: (Belgium) Ponnet

Semifinals

10 April 1985	Inter Milan	2–0	(Spain) Real Madrid	Milan
	Brady 25' (pen.); Altobelli 57'			Stadium: Giuseppe Meazza; Attendance: 75 521; Referee: (Austria) Wöhrer

24 April 1985	(Spain) Real Madrid	3–0 (3–2 agg.)	Inter Milan	Madrid
	Santillana 12' 42'; Míchel 57'			Stadium: Santiago Bernabéu; Attendance: 90 000; Referee: (Scotland) Valentine

== Statistics ==
Source:.

==== Players statistics ====
No.	Pos	Nat	Player	Total		Serie A	
No.	Pos	Nat	Player	Apps	Goals	Apps	Goals
	GK	(Italy) ITA	Walter Zenga	25	-23	25	−23
	DF	(Italy) ITA	Giuseppe Bergomi	29	2	29	2
	DF	(Italy) ITA	Riccardo Ferri	28	1	28	1
	DF	(Italy) ITA	Giuseppe Baresi	30	1	30	1
	DF	(Italy) ITA	Fulvio Collovati	29	2	29	2
	MF	(Italy) ITA	Antonio Sabato	29	1	29	1
	MF	(Italy) ITA	Gianpiero Marini	23	3	20+3	3
	MF	(Italy) ITA	Andrea Mandorlini	29	0	28+1	0
	MF	(Republic of Ireland) IRL	Liam Brady	29	2	29	2
	FW	(Italy) ITA	Alessandro Altobelli	30	17	30	17
	FW	(West Germany) FRG	Karl-Heinz Rummenigge	26	8	26	8
	GK	(Italy) ITA	Recchi	5	-5	5	−5
	MF	(Italy) ITA	Franco Causio	24	0	11+13	0
	MF	(Italy) ITA	Giancarlo Pasinato	12	1	4+8	1
	MF	(Italy) ITA	Cucchi	7	0	3+4	0
	FW	(Italy) ITA	Muraro	7	1	2+5	1
	DF	(Italy) ITA	Bini	4	0	2+2	0
	GK	(Italy) ITA	Montagna	0	0	0	0

- Source: http://calcio-seriea.net/presenze/1984/899/

== Sources ==
- RSSSF - Italy 1984/85
