= Welcome to the Masquerade =

Studio album by Thousand Foot Krutch
- Released: September 8, 2009
- Studio: Compound Recording (Seattle, WA); Stringnoize Drum Room (Hamilton, ON, Canada); Teerawk Music Publishing (Brentwood, TN); The Drawing Room (Windsor, ON, Canada)
- Genre: Christian rock; Christian metal; nu metal; hard rock; rap metal
- Length: 46:14
- Label: Tooth & Nail
- Producer: Aaron Sprinkle; Trevor McNevan

Thousand Foot Krutch chronology
The Flame in All of Us (2007)	Welcome to the Masquerade (2009)	Live at the Masquerade (2011)

Singles from Welcome to the Masquerade
- 1. "Bring Me to Life" Released: April 22, 2009; 2. "Forward Motion" Released: May 17, 2009; 3. "Fire It Up" Released: July 28, 2009; 4. "Already Home" Released: January 6, 2010; 5. "E for Extinction" Released: June 28, 2010; 6. "Look Away" Released: 2010

Fan Edition

Welcome to the Masquerade is the fifth studio album by Canadian Christian rock band Thousand Foot Krutch. Returning to their earlier nu metal style inspired by Linkin Park, Welcome to the Masquerade features a refined version of the sound featured on second studio album Phenomenon. Released on September 8, 2009 by Tooth & Nail Records, the album entered the Billboard 200 at No. 35 and the Christian Album charts at No. 2.

Before its release, band frontman Trevor McNevan stated that "the new record is definitely more aggressive. In some areas, it's the heaviest we've ever been."

== Musical style and concept ==
"The inspiration behind the album comes from people hiding things in their life," McNevan has stated, "Masquerading through life, hiding their frustrations."

"Each song is kind of dealing with those different situations. Some of it is just saying, 'I've been through this, and this is how I found hope in this situation."

"A lot of our peers are getting a little poppier, and I understand that and appreciate it," stated McNevan. "I just felt like for us, it was the right time to step in the other direction. It's big crunchy rock and roll."

"Between the economy and everything else, this is as good a time as has ever been to drop our stereotypes — all the stuff that separates us — and get down to the black and white of loving people as God intended it to be," McNevan suggests.

== Guests ==
Welcome to the "Masquerade features multiple performers. Aaron Sprinkle returned as the band's producer, from producing the band's previous record Phenomenon, alongside Trevor McNevan. Matt Carter of Emery assisted with McNevan early in 2009. Phil X, who had recorded guitars for the two previous Thousand Foot Krutch records, did not return for this album. However, Randy Torres recorded "some sweet licks" on the record according to a Tooth & Nail podcast. Guitar duties were also shared by McNevan, Sprinkle and a third guest Pete Stewart, who recorded the guitar solo near the end of the song "Fire it Up". Stewart surprisingly entered the studio with TFK despite the fact that he no longer considers himself a Christian. The band additionally hired Randy Staub to mix "Welcome to the Masquerade"; Staub is famous for mixing Metallica's record The Black Album.

== Reception ==
Professional ratings
Review scores
Source	Rating
AllMusic	4.5/5 stars
Alternative Addiction	3.5/5 stars
Jesusfreakhideout.com	4.5/5 stars
Jesusfreakhideout.com (Fan Edition)	4/5 stars
Patrol Magazine	5.7/10

"Fire It Up" has already been praised as a hit with a similar potential to "Rawkfist" and "Move" with Tyler Hess of ChristianMusicZine.com describing it as "vintage Thousand Foot Krutch, with obvious arena play potential".

C.E. Moore of TheChristianManifesto.com described the song "as everything you've come to love about the band. It's a raucous number that will get your heart pumping, your feet moving, and your head banging. 'Fire It Up' fires on all cylinders."

Roger Gelwicks of Jesusfreakhideout praised the album on his review "TFK dons a more produced approach to hard rock this time around while at the same time maintaining the unrestrained and raucous vibe the band is known for. And this being the fifth album from the Canadian band, there's a progression here that many old and new fans have waited to hear," he stated.

Allmusic.com also had high praise for the album "the band's full-scale audio assault makes it difficult to imagine that they could ever top the crystal-clear production and deliberate crunch of Masquerade. Each track is propelled by muscular riffs, fighting its way into permanent memory alongside the greatest mainstream rock bands of the decade," their review states.

"Fire It Up" has peaked at No. 35 on the Billboard Rock charts while "Bring Me to Life" has peaked at number No. 2 on Christian Rock radio.

"Forward Motion" has reached No. 48 on the Billboard Christian Songs charts.

== Release and promotion ==
"Bring Me To Life" was available for free download during June 2009 from the band's site if an email address was provided.

Both "Fire It Up" and "Bring Me To Life" were added to the band's live set list before the album was released. "Bring Me To Life" was first played live at Ignite Alaska in Fairbanks, Alaska, where the band performed the song as their encore. McNevan said that it was the first time the band had played a song live that had not already been released on an album. They also played "Fire It Up" at Wonder Jam in June 2009.

The band announced a Fall 2009 tour to support Welcome to The Masquerade, sharing the stage with Jars of Clay, AA Talks, B.Reith, FM Static and This Beautiful Republic.

The album was made for pre-order on July 24, 2009, and was released on September 8, 2009 without delay.

The trailer for the album was released on August 3. It featured a 45-second clip of the song "Welcome to the Masquerade".

"Fire It Up" is featured in NHL 10 and MX vs. ATV Reflex video game. It is also featured in the G.I. Joe: The Rise of Cobra trailer.

"Fire It Up" has also been released for download on the Rock Band music store.

On September 3, 2009, on the Tooth and Nail podcast, McNevan confirmed that a music video was in pre-production for "Fire It Up".

"Scream" was used as the introduction music for Harrison Ford at the 2009 Scream Awards.

"Invitation/Welcome to the Masquerade" was used for the 2010 Detroit Red Wings Stanley Cup Playoff video played before each game at Joe Louis Arena. It was also the music video for 2009's video game Marvel Ultimate Alliance 2:Fusion.

"Fire It Up" is the theme tune of the Backdraft monster truck, driven by Jeremy Slifko.

A fan edition of Welcome to the Masquerade came out on October 11, 2011. It contained three new tracks, including "Shook", "Take it Out on Me" and "Anyone Else".

== Track listing ==
All tracks are written by Steve Augustine, Joel Bruyere & Trevor McNevan.

Album release
No.	Title	Length
1.	"The Invitation (Intro)"	0:59
2.	"Welcome to the Masquerade"	3:41
3.	"Fire It Up"	3:07
4.	"Bring Me to Life"	3:36
5.	"E for Extinction"	3:51
6.	"Watching Over Me"	4:18
7.	"The Part That Hurts the Most (Is Me)"	3:59
8.	"Scream"	3:26
9.	"Look Away"	4:01
10.	"Forward Motion"	3:54
11.	"Outta Control"	3:27
12.	"Smack Down"	3:21
13.	"Already Home"	4:30
Total length:		46:14

All tracks are written by Steve Augustine, Joel Bruyere & Trevor McNevan.

Fan Edition (additional tracks)
No.	Title	Length
14.	"Shook"	3:25
15.	"Take It Out on Me"	3:17
16.	"Anyone Else"	3:35
Total length:		56:32

== Singles ==
- "Bring Me to Life" was released as the album's lead single on April 22, 2009.
- "Forward Motion" was released as a radio single on May 17, 2009.
- "Fire It Up" was released to mainstream rock radio on July 28, 2009.
- "Already Home" - was released on January 6, 2010.
- "E for Extinction" was released on June 28, 2010.
- "Look Away" was released to Christian CHR in August 2010.

== Charts ==
Year	Chart	Peak position
2009	U.S. Billboard 200	35
2009	U.S. Billboard Top Alternative Albums	8
2009	U.S. Billboard Top Rock Albums	13
2009	U.S. Billboard Top Christian Albums	2
2009	U.S. Billboard Top Digital Albums	14

== Awards ==
In 2010, the album was nominated for a Dove Award for Rock Album of the Year at the 41st GMA Dove Awards.

== Personnel ==
Thousand Foot Krutch

- Trevor McNevan – vocals, guitars, keys; producer, engineering
- Joel Bruyere – bass; engineering
- Steve Augustine – drums; engineering

Production

- Aaron Sprinkle – producer, engineering; additional guitars, keys
- Randy Staub – mixing
- Zach Blackstone – mix assistance
- Ted Jensen – mastering
- Matt Carter – additional engineering and editing
- Randy Torres – additional guitars
- Pete Stewart – guitar solo in "Fire It Up"
- Chris Carmichael – strings
- James Hodgin – management
- Brandon Ebel – A&R, executive producer
- Jeff Carver – A&R

Artwork

- Invisible Creature, Inc. – art direction
  - Ryan Clark – design
- Jerad Knudson – model photography
- David Molnar – band photography
