= Meazza =

Meazza (pronounced [meˈattsa]) is an Italian surname from Lombardy. Notable people with the surname include:

- Giuseppe Meazza (1910–1979), Italian soccer player and manager
- Luca Meazza (born 1965), Italian soccer player
- Max Meazza (born 1952), Italian singer and songwriter

== See also ==
- Stadio Giuseppe Meazza, a soccer stadium in Milan
- Meaza
- Meazzi
