= Already Home =

Already Home may refer to:

- "Already Home", a song by Jay-Z, from the album The Blueprint 3
- "Already Home" (Thousand Foot Krutch song)
- "Already Home", a 2014 song by A Great Big World on Is There Anybody Out There?
