= Bring Me to Life (disambiguation) =

"Bring Me to Life" is a song by American rock band Evanescence.

Bring Me to Life may also refer to:

- "Bring Me to Life" (Thousand Foot Krutch song)
- "Bring Me to Life", song by Marc Kinchen
- "Bring Me to Life", song by Skylar Stecker
- "Bring Me to Life", song by Jan Wayne
