= Eva Under Fire =

American rock band

- Origin: Detroit, Michigan, US
- Genres: Alternative metal; hard rock; post-grunge
- Years active: 2015–present
- Label: Better Noise
- Members: Eva Marie; Rob Lyberg; Chris Slapnik; Ed Gawlik; Dave Miller II
- Past members: Jeff Llewellyn; Corey Newsom
- Website: evaunderfire.com

Eva Under Fire is an American rock band from Detroit, Michigan, that consists of lead vocalist Eva Marie, guitarists Rob Lyberg and Chris Slapnik, bassist Ed Gawlik, and drummer Dave Miller II.

The band was named as an "Artist to Watch" in 2023 by Pandora Radio.

Their 2022 song "Blow" reached no. 11 on Mainstream Rock Airplay and no. 33 on Rock & Alternative Airplay. Their 2023 album, Love, Drugs & Misery, came in at no. 99 on Top Current Album Sales.

In November 2023, Eva Under Fire collaborated with the Canadian Christian rock band Thousand Foot Krutch to remake the latter's song "All I Need to Know", from their album The End Is Where We Begin.

== Band members ==
Current

- Amanda "Eva Marie" Lyberg – vocals
- Rob Lyberg – lead guitar
- Chris Slapnik – rhythm guitar
- Ed Gawlik – bass
- Dave Miller II – drums

Past

- Jeff Llewellyn – bass
- Corey Newsom – drums

== Discography ==
=== Studio albums ===
- Anchors (2015)
- Love, Drugs & Misery (2022)
- Villainous (2026)

=== Singles ===
Song	Year	Peak chart positions		Album
Song	Year	US Airplay	US Main.	Album
"Blow" (original or with Spencer Charnas)	2022	33	11	Love, Drugs & Misery
"Unstoppable" (original or with Cory Marks)	2023	—	21	Love, Drugs & Misery
"Villainous" (feat. Maria Brink)	2026	29	7	Villainous

=== As featured artist ===
Title	Year	Album
"Every Second" (From Ashes to New feat. Eva Under Fire)	2019	Non-album single
"Voodoo Doll" (The Funeral Portrait feat. Eva Under Fire)	2022	Greetings from Suffocate City
"All I Need to Know" (Thousand Foot Krutch feat. Eva Under Fire)	2024	The End Is Where We Begin: Reignited
