= Max Meazza =

Italian singer

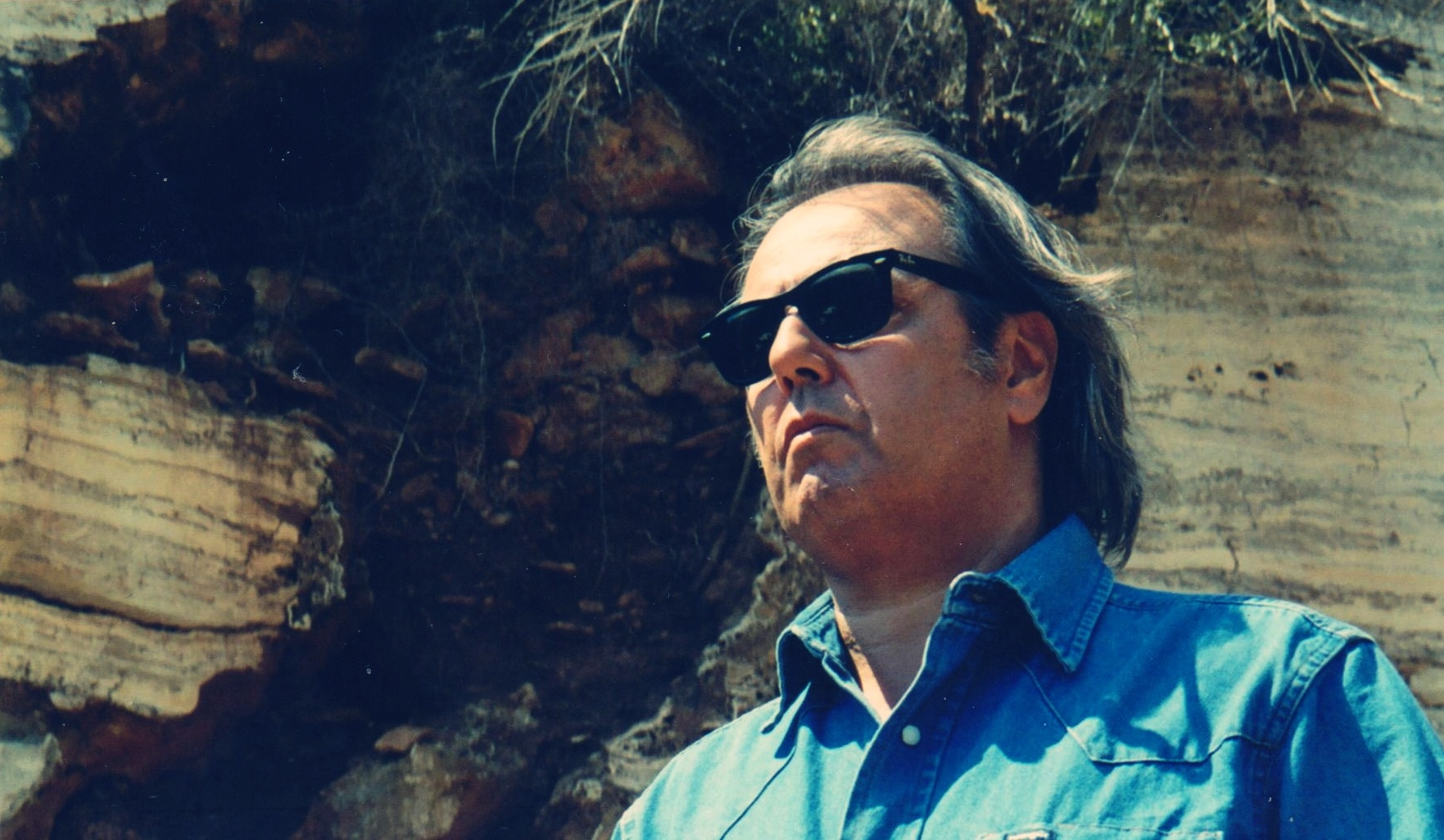
Max Meazza

Max Meazza (born 19 May 1952) is an Italian singer-songwriter and recording artist. He records for Polydor Records and Ariola Records, Appaloosa Records.

== Career ==
Meazza is a former member of the country rock band PUEBLO, which was produced by La Bionda. He started with the band recording at Apple Studios in London in April 1974. He recorded a single in Germany for Ariola and went back to Milan in 1979. He signed for Appaloosa Records recording three albums: Shaving The Car, Personal Exile with Skip Battin of the American band The Byrds and Better Late Than Never. In 1985, he signed for Solid Air Records recording the album Nightime Call with guest Paolo Fresu. He recorded Summer of 71 published by Solid Air records via I.R.D.w.

Meazza rejoined Pueblo in 1999, recording the reunion CD The Big Thunder with his partner, blues guitarist Claudio Bazzari. An EP called The Sleepless City came out in 2005, recorded with Luigi Bonafede and one year later the CD Highway 101. In 2007, Meazza started to play live and the same year he recorded West Coast Hotel.

In 2009, he played live with the Australian guitar Rock/Blues musician Rob Tognoni, recording the album Race Against Destiny, featuring the cover of the song Down and Dirty written by Bad Company and Tognoni on guitar. Other guests included jazz guitarist Gigi Cifarelli on the song Solid Air written by John Martyn. Another CD came out in 2013, entitled In Cold Blood under the name Max Meazza & Pueblo, featuring Tony O'Malley on vocals and keyboards.

Meazza expected to release a new CD Charlie Parker Loves Me with vocalist Marc Jordan who wrote the song. Mark Winkler wrote and did the vocals for "Forward Motion". In December 2015, P-Vine Records in Japan released Charlie Parker Loves Me. In March 2016, it published a collection, For The Weekend, which included Incognito featuring Mario Biondi and Chaka Khan and "Face in the crowd". Together Like a Car Crash was published in 2019 by Desolation Angels and is available for downloading only on ITunes, CDBaby Spotify and so on...featuring : Alisa Joe from Philadelphia and Aliie Keck from Nashville.
