= The End Is Where We Begin (album) =

2012 studio album by Thousand Foot Krutch

Studio album by Thousand Foot Krutch
- Released: April 17, 2012
- Recorded: August–November 2011
- Genres: Christian rock; Christian metal; nu metal; hard rock; rap metal
- Length: 48:39
- Labels: TFK Music Inc.; The Fuel Music
- Producers: Aaron Sprinkle; Trevor McNevan

Thousand Foot Krutch chronology
Live at the Masquerade (2011)	The End Is Where We Begin (2012)	Oxygen: Inhale (2014)

Deluxe Version

Professional ratings
Review scores
Source	Rating
AllMusic	2.5/5 stars
Jesusfreakhideout.com	4/5 stars 3.5/5 stars
Sputnikmusic	2/5

The End Is Where We Begin is the sixth studio album by Canadian Christian rock band Thousand Foot Krutch. It was released in the United States on April 17, 2012, and in Canada on May 8, 2012. Vocalist Trevor McNevan has stated "the record is some of the heaviest stuff we've done and some of the lightest". In 2023, the band announced their return from hiatus and their first new project since 2017, which was set to be a newly re-recorded version of the album entitled "The End Is Where We Begin: Reignited" while collaborating with several of their musical peers. The re-recorded album was released on July 26, 2024.

== Background ==
On November 29, 2011, they announced that they would be leaving Tooth & Nail Records to release the album independently. The band has set up a webpage offering various fans pre-release packages in exchange for advance support for the costs in recording and releasing the album. Fans who donated to the band received early downloads of the songs "The End is Where We Begin" and "Courtesy Call" on January 7, 2012. The official release date was announced as April 17, 2012, via the band's Twitter feed.

"War of Change" was used by WWE as the official theme song to their Over the Limit 2012 pay-per-view event.

The song "Light Up The Sky", is featured in the official EA Sports NHL 13 Video Game Soundtrack, which features sixteen songs in the official version. This song also has been played in several FM Radio stations all around Canada and the United States.

== Commercial performance ==
The album debuted at No. 14 on the US Billboard 200, selling 23,000 copies. The album also debuted No. 1 in "Hard Rock" and "Christian" albums. The songs "Courtesy Call" and "War of Change" were both certified platinum and gold in the United States by the RIAA, respectively.

== Track listing ==
All tracks are written by Steve Augustine, Joel Bruyere, and Trevor McNevan except where noted.

Album release
No.	Title	Writer(s)	Length
1.	"The Introduction"		1:01
2.	"We Are"		3:18
3.	"Light Up the Sky"	Augustine, Bruyere, McNevan, Aaron Sprinkle	4:00
4.	"The End Is Where We Begin"		3:45
5.	"Let the Sparks Fly"	Augustine, Bruyere, McNevan, Sprinkle	4:06
6.	"I Get Wicked"		3:33
7.	"Be Somebody"		3:42
8.	"This Is a Warning (Intro)"		0:47
9.	"Courtesy Call"		3:57
10.	"War of Change"		3:51
11.	"Down"		3:27
12.	"All I Need to Know"	Zac Maloy, McNevan	4:10
13.	"Fly on the Wall"		4:03
14.	"So Far Gone"	Augustine, Bruyere, McNevan, Sprinkle	4:29
15.	"Outroduction"		0:38
Total length:			48:39

The End Is Where We Begin (Reignited)

Remix album by Thousand Foot Krutch
- Released: July 26, 2024
- Labels: Endurance Music Group; The Fuel Music
- Producers: Trevor McNevan; Joel Bruyere; Aaron Sprinkle

Reignited (2024 remix version)
No.	Title	Writer(s)	Length
1.	"We Are (featuring Sixx:A.M.)"		3:19
2.	"Light Up the Sky (featuring Icon for Hire)"	Augustine, Bruyere, McNevan, Sprinkle	3:57
3.	"The End Is Where We Begin (featuring The Funeral Portrait)"		3:21
4.	"Let the Sparks Fly (featuring Saint Asonia)"	Augustine, Bruyere, McNevan, Sprinkle	3:50
5.	"I Get Wicked (featuring Red)"		3:33
6.	"Be Somebody (featuring Citizen Soldier)"		3:38
7.	"Courtesy Call (featuring Ronnie Wood)"		3:53
8.	"War of Change (featuring Adelitas Way)"		3:18
9.	"Down (featuring New Medicine)"		3:24
10.	"All I Need to Know (featuring Eva Under Fire)"	Maloy, McNevan	3:53
11.	"Fly on the Wall (featuring Greylee and Unsecret)"		4:06
12.	"So Far Gone (featuring Art of Dying)"		4:26
13.	"Courtesy Call (trailer remix featuring Cofer)"		3:09
Total length:			47:54

== TFK Remixes EP ==
TFK Remixes EP

Remix album by Thousand Foot Krutch
- Released: October 1, 2012
- Recorded: June–October 2012
- Genres: Christian metal, nu metal, rapcore, remix
- Length: 7:08
- Label: Independent
- Producers: Aaron Sprinkle, Trevor McNevan

In honor of their historic debut on Billboard, Thousand Foot Krutch made two remixed songs and gave them out for free on October 1. The remixes are made with a style similar to Trance, using McNevan's vocals and excluding guitars or drums.

All tracks are written by Steve Augustine, Joel Bruyere, Trevor McNevan, Aaron Sprinkle.

Remix tracks
No.	Title	Length
1.	"Let the Sparks Fly (Broken Sauce remix)"	3:45
2.	"Light Up the Sky (Solomon Olds remix)"	3:23
Total length:		7:08

== Follow-up remix albums ==
On the "RadioU" official page, it was announced that Thousand Foot Krutch would be releasing an entire remix album in response to the positive feedback they received from their TFK Remixes EP songs. The name of the album, Metamorphosiz: The End Remixes Vol. 1, was announced on November 1. On January 19, 2013, McNevan announced that they will be releasing another remix album in 2013.

== Personnel ==
- Aaron Sprinkle - producer, keyboards, additional guitars
- Trevor McNevan - producer, vocals, guitars, acoustic guitar
- Joel Bruyere - bass guitar
- Steve Augustine - drums, percussion
- Chris Carmichael - string arrangements

== Charts ==
=== Weekly charts ===
Chart (2012)	Peak position
U.S. Billboard 200	14
U.S. Billboard Top Christian Albums	1
U.S. Billboard Top Hard Rock Albums	1
U.S. Billboard Top Digital Albums	8
U.S. Billboard Top Independent Albums	3
U.S. Billboard Top Alternative Albums	3
U.S. Billboard Top Rock Albums	7

=== Year-end charts ===
Year-end
Charts (2012)	Position
Billboard Christian Albums	20
Billboard Hard Rock Albums	29
Charts (2013)	Position
Billboard Christian Albums	34
