= Phenomenon (Thousand Foot Krutch song) =

Single by Thousand Foot Krutch

from the album Phenomenon
- Released: September 2003
- Studio: Compound Recording (Seattle, WA); Metalworks Studios (Vancouver, BC) (drum set)
- Genre: Nu metal
- Length: 2:59
- Label: Tooth & Nail
- Songwriter(s): Trevor McNevan, Steve Augustine and Joel Bruyere

Thousand Foot Krutch singles chronology
"Unbelievable" (2002)	"Phenomenon" (2003)	"Rawkfist" (2003)

"Phenomenon" is a song by Thousand Foot Krutch and is the first track on the Phenomenon, released in 2003.

The song is about "standing up for what you believe in" as McNevan describes it. The song was No. 1 on ChristianRock.Net as were their songs, "Bounce" and "Rawkfist". The song also peaked at No. 37 on the R&R Active Rock charts.

== Personnel ==
- Trevor McNevan - vocals and guitar
- Joel Bruyere - bass guitar
- Steve Augustine - drums
