= Huron Park Secondary School =

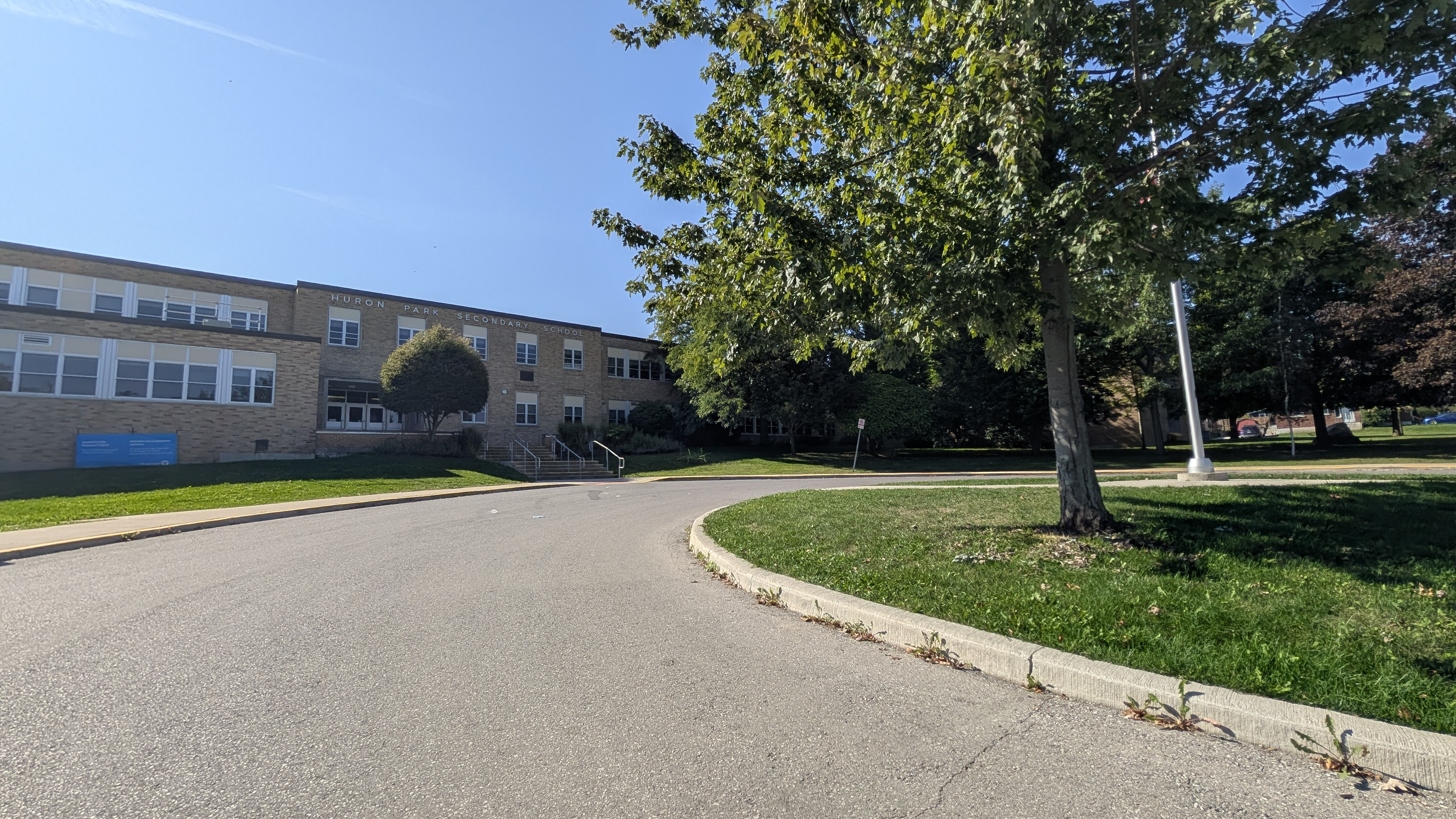

Location
- Woodstock, Ontario; Canada; 43.139975°N 80.739072°W

Information
- Type: High school
- Opened: September 1955; 71 years ago
- Superintendent: Sheila Powell
- Principal: Kirby Duffy
- Grades: 9–12
- Enrollment: 800+
- Colors: Purple and White
- Team name: Huron Park Huskies
- Communities served: Oxford
- Website: tvdsb.ca
- 2018 Wossa Champions

Huron Park Secondary School (HPSS) is a high school in Woodstock, Ontario. It opened in 1955, and has a population of approximately 1000 students.

== Notable alumni ==
- Ian Tanner – singer and songwriter
- Elizabeth Wettlaufer – serial killer and former registered nurse

== See also ==
- Education in Ontario
- List of secondary schools in Ontario
