= The Flame in All of Us =

Studio album by Thousand Foot Krutch
- Released: September 18, 2007
- Genre: Christian rock; Christian metal; post-grunge; alternative metal
- Length: 47:46
- Label: Tooth & Nail
- Producer: Ken Andrews

Thousand Foot Krutch chronology
The Art of Breaking (2005)	The Flame in All of Us (2007)	Welcome to the Masquerade (2009)

Special Edition

Professional ratings
Review scores
Source	Rating
AllMusic	3.5/5 stars
Alternative Addiction	4.5/5 stars
Cross Rhythms	7/10 squares
Cross Rhythms (Special Edition)	8/10 squares
Jesusfreakhideout.com	4/5 stars
Jesusfreakhideout.com (Special Edition)	4/5 stars

The Flame in All Of Us is the fourth studio album by Christian rock band Thousand Foot Krutch; the album was released on September 18, 2007 through Tooth & Nail Records. It entered the charts at No. 58 on the Billboard 200. The band recorded the album with producer Ken Andrews (Pete Yorn, Mae) in Los Angeles in spring 2007. The CD is a rendition of life's most pressing questions asked by every single person to walk the earth. A special edition of The Flame In All of Us was released simultaneously, with a DVD detailing the making of the record. This was the first time the band has let their fans in on the behind the scenes of their recording.

== Concept ==
The band's front man Trevor McNevan describes the concept as "No Matter what you believe or where you were raised, you have the same core group of questions as the next person, who am I? Why am I here? What is life about?"

== Musical style ==
The album almost completely departs from the rap metal and nu metal sounds of Set it Off and Phenomenon becoming heavier and more ambient. The album's style ranges from heavy metal on tracks "Falls Apart" and "Inhuman" to softer rock on "What Do We Know" and "Wish You Well".

"In more ways than one this is the most refreshing record we've made," McNevan has stated. "It was a uniting experience that took a lot of faith to get done. My favorite albums are the ones with lots of contrast that you can listen to front to back, that take you on a journey. And I believe the strongest bands are the ones that a listener can grow up with."

== Track listing ==
Album release
No.	Title	Length
1.	"The Flame in All of Us"	3:22
2.	"Falls Apart"	3:35
3.	"New Drug"	2:44
4.	"What Do We Know"	3:19
5.	"Favorite Disease"	3:47
6.	"My Home"	3:41
7.	"My Own Enemy"	3:01
8.	"Learn to Breathe"	4:08
9.	"Inhuman"	4:06
10.	"Broken Wing"	3:55
11.	"The Safest Place"	4:08
12.	"Wish You Well" (includes a hidden track titled "The Last Song" that starts at 4:06)	7:44
Total length:		47:46

Family Christian Stores bonus track
No.	Title	Length
13.	"Wish You Well" (Piano Version)	3:50

== Credits ==
- Trevor McNevan - vocals, guitar
- Joel Bruyere - bass
- Steve Augustine - drums

Production

- Ken Andrews - producer, engineering, mixing
- Ross Hogarth - engineering
- Dave Hill - photography
- Ryan Clark (musician) - design, art direction
- Tom Baker - mastering

Additional musicians

- Ken Andrews - keyboards, programming, additional backing vocals
- Charlotte Martin - additional backing vocals on Inhuman
- Phil X - additional guitars
- Steve Black - string arrangements

== DVD (Inspired Heart Edition) ==
Family Christian Stores exclusive:

1. "Making of the Record"
2. "On-Tour with TFK"
3. "The Flame in All of Us" (Acoustic)
4. "Breathe You In" (Acoustic)
5. "Rawkfist" (Music Video)
6. "Move" (Music Video)
7. "Bonus Footage"

== Music videos ==
"The Flame in all of Us" has two music videos, more than any other TFK album. The official video for the album is "Falls Apart" and there is a second bonus video for "Favorite Disease".

The "Falls Apart" video starts off showing the band in a dark wood room, with lots of rope around them. The members only have enough room to play their instruments. Eventually a man and a woman are shown and they are being held together by ropes. The man walks over to the woman and puts his arm around her. After a while she gets up and starts walking away, but then the ropes come off around everyone (the band and the couple alike). As a result, all of the couple's body parts lie on the floor. One of the man's hands crawls over to one of the woman's hands to give her a needle with thread in it to sew both of them back up while the band ends the song.

The video for "Favorite Disease" involves the band but does not show them playing instruments. McNevan is only shown singing at three parts in the song. The video begins with four soldiers (the band) walking in a line through a grass field. McNevan, the commanding officer, orders Joel Bruyere, against his will, to head in one direction. As they are walking they are fired at by unseen enemies and one soldier (Bruyere) goes down; before Bruyere dies he hands McNevan a piece of paper. As the trio are eating dinner by a fire, McNevan starts singing the song and reads the paper, McNevan then proceeds to go to Bruyere's grave. A flash back then occurs in which McNevan realizes that if he had not have made Bruyere go in the one direction Bruyere would have not been shot; also in the flash back it shows McNevan dying instead of Bruyere.
