= Meaza =

Meaza (Amharic: መዓዛ) is an Ethopian female given name. Notable people with the name include:

- Meaza Ashenafi (born 1964), Ethiopian lawyer and women's rights activist
- Meaza Mohammed, Ethiopian journalist and human rights activist

== See also ==
- Meazza
