= Angelo Recchi =

Italian footballer (born 1951)

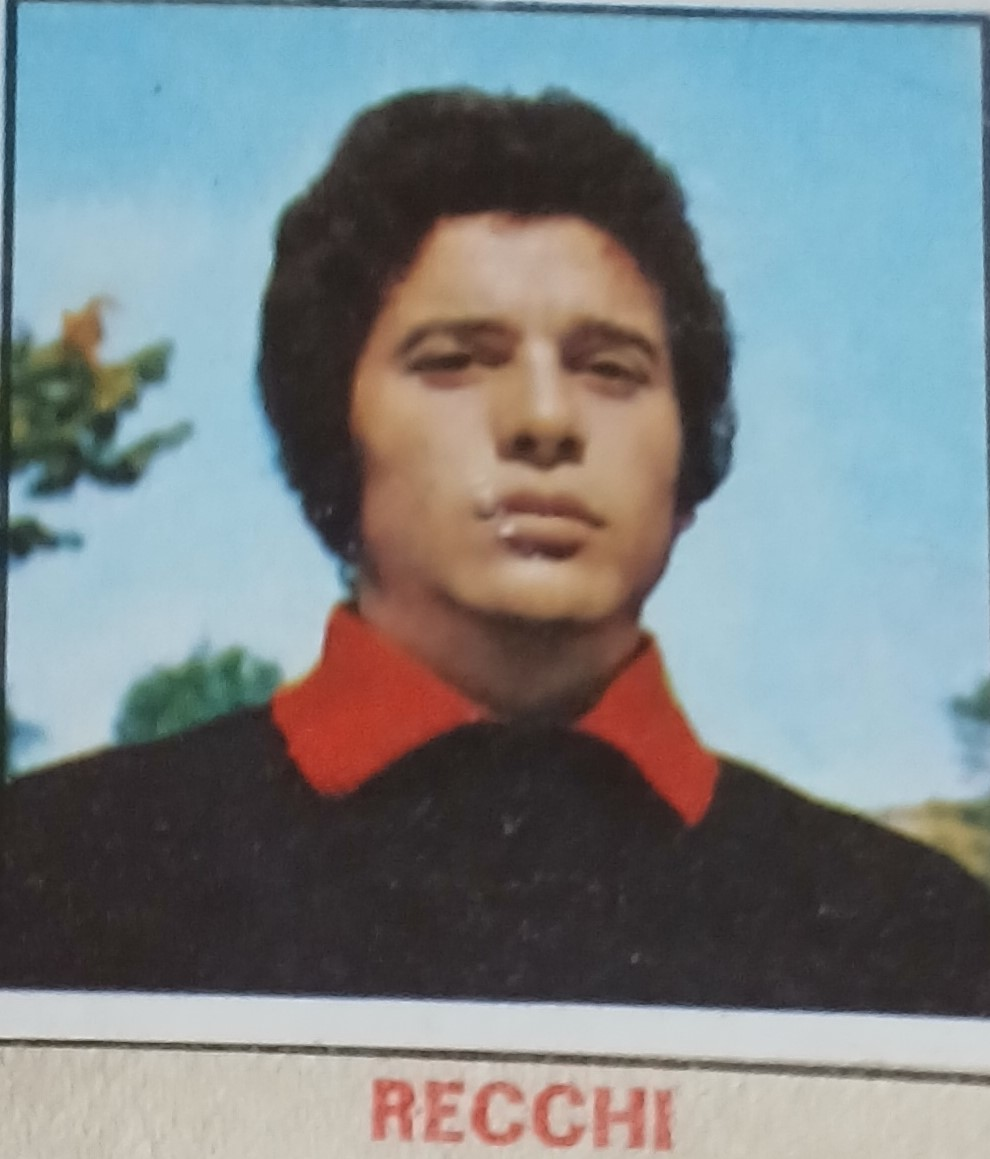

Personal information
- Date of birth: 27 March 1951 (age 75)
- Place of birth: Sassoferrato, Italy
- Height: 1.80 m (5 ft 11 in)
- Position: Goalkeeper

Senior career*
Years	Team	Apps	(Gls)
1968–1969	Tevere Roma	2	(0)
1969–1975	Mantova	105	(0)
1975–1976	Ascoli	2	(0)
1976–1978	Rimini	50	(0)
1978–1979	Pescara	20	(0)
1979–1983	Cesena	131	(0)
1983–1985	Internazionale	6	(0)
1985–1987	Ancona	44	(0)
- * Club domestic league appearances and goals

Angelo Recchi (born 27 March 1951) is a retired Italian professional footballer who played as a goalkeeper.

== Career ==
=== Playing career ===
Recchi made his debut at Tevere Roma in 1968. The following year he moved to Mantova, where he contributed to the club's Serie B championship title in 1970–71 and promotion to Serie A, making 11 appearances in the top flight. He remained at the club for a further three seasons before moving on.

In 1975 he joined Ascoli, making two further Serie A appearances. He then spent two seasons at Rimini and one at Pescara before joining Cesena in 1979.

At Cesena, Recchi was the first-choice goalkeeper in the side that finished level on 48 points with Genoa behind champions Milan (50 points) in the 1980–81 Serie B season, winning promotion to Serie A. He went on to make 131 consecutive league appearances for the club, including Cesena's first season back in the top flight in 1981–82, when the club achieved survival in Serie A.

He was subsequently signed by Internazionale, who chose him as backup to the young Walter Zenga, who became Inter's first-choice goalkeeper from the 1983–84 season onward. In his two seasons at Inter, Recchi made one Serie A appearance in the first and five in the second, along with two UEFA Cup appearances and one in the Coppa Italia.

He ended his career in Serie C1 with Ancona, where he played from 1985 to 1987. In total, he made 74 appearances in Serie A.

With the exception of his two appearances for Ascoli — in which he conceded 6 goals — Recchi maintained a goals-conceded average of under one per game throughout the rest of his career.

=== After retirement ===
A qualified medical doctor, Recchi also worked as a goalkeeping coach at the amateur sports club Candia Baraccola Aspio in Ancona, where he also coached youth teams.

== Honours ==
=== Club ===
Mantova

- Serie B: 1970–71
