= Exhale (Thousand Foot Krutch album) =

Studio album by Thousand Foot Krutch
- Released: June 17, 2016
- Genres: Christian rock; Christian metal; hard rock; nu metal
- Length: 44:58
- Labels: TFK Music Inc.; The Fuel Music
- Producers: Trevor McNevan; Aaron Sprinkle

Thousand Foot Krutch chronology
Oxygen: Inhale (2014)	Exhale (2016)	Untraveled Roads (2017)

Singles from Exhale
- 1. "Incomplete"; 2. "Running with Giants"; 3. "Give Up the Ghost"

Exhale (stylized in all caps as EXHALE) is the eighth studio album by Thousand Foot Krutch. The Fuel Music released the album on June 17, 2016. The album debuted at number 34 on the US Billboard 200, selling 14,000 copies.

== Track listing ==
All tracks are written by Steve Augustine, Joel Bruyere and Trevor McNevan.

No.	Title	Length
1.	"Running with Giants"	4:08
2.	"Incomplete"	3:26
3.	"Give Up the Ghost"	4:21
4.	"A Different Kind of Dynamite"	2:58
5.	"The River"	3:22
6.	"Push"	4:20
7.	"Off the Rails"	3:44
8.	"Adrenaline"	3:23
9.	"Lifeline"	3:38
10.	"Can't Stop This"	3:55
11.	"Born Again"	3:33
12.	"Honest"	4:10
Total length:		44:58

Best Buy Exclusive Edition (bonus tracks)
No.	Title	Writer(s)	Length
13.	"Where the River Flows" (Collective Soul cover)	Ed Roland	3:46

== Critical reception ==
Professional ratings
Review scores
Source	Rating
CCM Magazine	4/5 stars
The Christian Beat	4.7 stars on a 5 point scale
HM Magazine	4/5 stars
Jesusfreakhideout.com	3.5/5 stars 4/5 stars
New Release Today	4/5 stars
The Phantom Tollbooth	3.5/5 stars
Today's Christian Entertainment	3/5 stars

Awarding the album four stars at CCM Magazine, Andy Argyrakis writes, "[they sound] more confident and committed to fighting the good fight than ever before." Danielle Martin, rating the album four stars from HM Magazine, states, "Exhale is a bold proclamation of standing strong in their roots." Giving the album four stars by New Release Today, Mary Nikkel describes, "Exhale is full-bodied, infectious rock at its finest, empowering and emboldening listeners even as it serves up searing vocals and thunderous guitar riffs." Scott Mertens, indicating in three and a half review from The Phantom Tollbooth, says, "Exhale finds the group back to full-speed aggressive rock [...] for the most part, seems custom made for live performances. This could be the summer rocker for the CCM concertgoer with something between revolt and hope throughout." Signaling in a three star review by Today's Christian Entertainment, Abby Baracskai believes, "the album brings rock right to your front door in various heights and levels [...] The quality of the musical aspects of the album may be magnificent, but the lyrics can be a little lackluster." Chris Major, allocating the album 4.7 stars for The Christian Beat, responds, "Exhale is heavy, gritty, explosive, and bold, saturated with uncontainable energy from start to finish."

Christopher Smith, allotting the album three and a half stars by Jesus Freak Hideout, writes, "Exhale is far from a letdown, but it could certainly afford to take more risks. Part of the problem lies in having 11 rock songs in a row." Affixing a three and a half star review upon the album at Jesus Freak Hideout, Lucas Munachen says, "It may not be the return to form fans were hoping for, but it does remind us of why we fell in love with the band in the first place." Dylan O'Conner, bestowing a four star review upon the album from Jesus Freak Hideout, states, "it's a solid rock album. It may not be their best offering, but it's a worthy addition to the band's library." Rewarding the album with four stars at Jesus Freak Hideout, Sarah Berdon describes, "Though Exhale is full of components one has heard on previous albums, this record has many highlights, and fans of Thousand Foot Krutch will not want to miss this installment." Michael Weaver, awarding the album four stars by Jesus Freak Hideout, replies, "Thankfully, after the long held breath between albums, Exhale spells redemption. Exhale is more cohesive, features a better overall flow, and is probably their best work since Welcome to the Masquerade."

== Personnel ==
Credits adapted from AllMusic

Thousand Foot Krutch

- Trevor McNevan – lead and backing vocals, guitar, producer
- Joel Bruyere – bass guitar
- Steve Augustine – drums, percussion

Additional personnel

- Aaron Sprinkle – producer, additional guitars on "Honest"
- Phil X – additional guitars
- Brad Blackwood – mastering
- Ryan Clark (musician) – art direction, design
- Jr McNeely – mixing
- Brooks Reynolds – band photos

== Charts ==
Chart (2016)	Peak position
New Zealand Heatseekers Albums (RMNZ)	7
US Billboard 200	34
US Top Christian Albums (Billboard)	1
US Top Hard Rock Albums (Billboard)	2
US Independent Albums (Billboard)	4
US Top Rock Albums (Billboard)	6
