= Ian Tanner =

- Genres: Christian rock
- Occupations: Singer-songwriter, instrumentalist
- Instruments: keyboards, synthesizer, electronics, vocals, samples, guitar, bass
- Years active: 1986-present
- Labels: Reunion Records
- Website: www.iantanner.com

Ian Tanner is a singer/songwriter and multi-instrumentalist who has performed in rock bands since the mid-1980s. He was a founding member of Christian rock group The Awakening (1985–89), and later went on to form the band One Hundred Days with his fellow Awakening member, Andrew Horrocks. One Hundred Days performed from 1990 until 2000 when Tanner left the band and the group disbanded. He currently works as a producer, composer and studio musician and tours with various recording artists, mostly from Canada.

== History ==
=== Formative years ===
Tanner began piano lessons at the age of six, and by ten years of age he could play proficiently by ear. He notes that he decided music was his main passion, so he quit playing hockey to focus more on his lessons and education.

In high school, Tanner played string bass in the orchestra, piano at concerts, drums in a show choir, and electric bass in a jazz ensemble.

He began writing his own music by the age of eight and while a teenager at Huron Park Secondary School (in Woodstock, Ontario) he formed a band called "The Guards Of Zeus", with classmates Jon Bartley and Mike McGinnis. In addition to this, he also played professionally with a local area "wedding band".

=== With 'The Awakening' ===
In the mid-1980s, Andrew Horrocks formed the band The Awakening. Before Tanner joined, the band consisted of bass player Allan Powell and eventually his brother Michael Powell joined the band on drums. In his final year of high school, Tanner began meeting Andrew Horrocks about joining the band, and was brought in to be the keyboardist and lead singer of the band.

The independently recorded "Two Worlds" album helped get The Awakening a record contract with Nashville Gospel label Reunion Records in 1986. They released two albums on that label in the mid-to-late 1980s before being dropped and before the eventual break-up of the band.

Due to less than enthusiastic album sales and the band's inability to finance their own American touring, Reunion dropped The Awakening from their roster. This eventually led to the break-up of the band in late 1989.

His recording experiences with The Awakening led Tanner to get employment at a Kitchener, Ontario recording studio called "Cedartree Recording Studio" under the leadership of J. Richard Hutt where he assisted in arranging, producing and computer training.

=== With 'One Hundred Days' ===
In the early 1990s, Tanner formed the band One Hundred Days with former Awakening guitarist Andrew Horrocks. The band originally consisted of Tanner, Horrocks and Gordon Stevenson on drums. On each subsequent One Hundred Days album, the band membership changed. 1996's Feels Like Love featured Glen Teeple on guitar and Steve Marsh on drums. Steve March died from cancer just before the album was released, and thus the band members changed once again. The final roster for the band consisted of Tanner and Horrocks, with Tony Lind on guitars and Darryl McWaters on drums. Their final album was done independent of a US label - 1998's "The Super Terrific Happy Hour."

In 2000, Tanner quit the band, citing an obvious lack of success in the marketplace coupled with personal and marital issues of his own. Horrocks went on to continue his work as an award-winning producer and engineer. Lind and McWaters would eventually re-join Tanner as members of Jim Witter's multi-media tribute show "The Piano Men - A Trip Through The 1970s with Billy Joel and Elton John."

=== After 'One Hundred Days' ===
In 2000 Tanner began focusing his career on studio work. He began working for a company in Canada which produced and created projects for children, specifically in the gospel industry. He worked on the Christian related DVD, "GodRocks!", and has won three songwriting and producing awards for his work.

He began touring as a side-musician, playing for artists such as George Fox, Jason McCoy, Deric Ruttan and Jim Witter. He has performed throughout the United States, Canada, Great Britain and Dubai with Jim Witter.

Tanner was asked to do an orchestral score for performances with The Phoenix Symphony Orchestra. His orchestrations and arrangements have been performed throughout the United States and Canada.

Tanner has released two solo albums, 2009's "Things Never To Say Out Loud" (released as a digital download on iTunes), and 2011's "Italian Waffles & Scotch," his first physical CD release in over ten years.

== Discography ==
=== With 'The Awakening' ===
Albums

- Two Worlds (LP) (1986)
- Sanctified (Reunion Records) (1987)
- Into Thy Hands (Reunion Records) (1988)

=== With 'One Hundred Days' ===
Albums

- The Obvious (1995)
- Counting By Heads (1996)
- Feels Like Love (1996)
- The Super Terrific Happy Hour (1998)

=== Solo recordings ===
Albums

- Things Never To Say Out Loud (2009)
- Italian Waffles & Scotch (2011)
