= Bring Me to Life (Thousand Foot Krutch song) =

Single by Thousand Foot Krutch

from the album Welcome to the Masquerade
- Released: April 22, 2009
- Recorded: 2009
- Genre: Alternative metal, nu metal
- Length: 3:39
- Label: Tooth & Nail
- Songwriter(s): Steve Augustine, Joel Bruyere and Trevor McNevan.

Thousand Foot Krutch singles chronology
"Favorite Disease" (2008)	"Bring Me to Life" (2009)	"Forward Motion" (2009)

"Bring Me to Life" is a song by the rock band Thousand Foot Krutch on their album Welcome to the Masquerade. It was released as a single on April 22, 2009. Thousand Foot Krutch were part of around 100 bands participated in Taco Bell's "Feed the Beat" competition, where they competed for a chance to record a single and have Taco Bell produce it and gain valuable marketing support for that single.

== Release and reception ==
"Bring Me to Life" was released via digital download and to radio stations on April 22, 2009, it peaked at number 2 on Christian rock radio on September 10, 2009. It was also well received with heavy iTunes sales and was for a limited time available for free legal download off feedthebeat.com.

== Style ==
The song features a keyboard, which is a new entry for Thousand Foot Krutch as they had previously only experimented with it on slower songs, with the keyboard used for both the intro and the bridge. The lyrics are both rapped and sung. The song itself appears to be influenced by bands such as Korn and Evanescence, as well as the band's own nu metal and rap rock roots.

== Personnel ==
- Trevor McNevan - vocals, guitars
- Joel Bruyere - bass
- Steve Augustine - drums
- Aaron Sprinkle - Keyboards

== Awards ==
The song was nominated for "Rock Recorded Song of the Year" at the 41st GMA Dove Awards.
