= Forward Motion =

Single by Thousand Foot Krutch

from the album Welcome to the Masquerade
- Released: May 2009
- Recorded: 2009
- Genre: Alternative rock, Christian rock, post-grunge
- Length: 3:39
- Label: Tooth & Nail
- Songwriter(s): Steve Augustine, Joel Bruyere and Trevor McNevan.

Thousand Foot Krutch singles chronology
"Bring Me to Life" (2009)	"Forward Motion" (2009)	"Fire It Up" (2009)

"Forward Motion" is the second single released in 2009 by the Christian rock band Thousand Foot Krutch from their album Welcome to the Masquerade.

== Chart performance ==
"Forward Motion" charted on the Billboard Hot Christian Songs chart at No. 44.

== Personnel ==
- Trevor McNevan - vocals, guitars
- Joel Bruyere - bass
- Steve Augustine - drums
- Aaron Sprinkle - keyboards
