= Set It Off (Thousand Foot Krutch album) =

Studio album by Thousand Foot Krutch
- Released: April 14, 2000
- Studios: Desert Moon, Anaheim, California; A.M.E. Studios, Ontario, Canada
- Genres: Nu metal, rap metal, Christian hardcore
- Length: 47:02
- Label: DJD (Note: The 2004 remastered edition was published through Tooth & Nail.)
- Producers: Thousand Foot Krutch, Scott Humphrey, Gavin Brown

Thousand Foot Krutch chronology
That's What People Do (1997)	Set It Off (2000)	Phenomenon (2003)

2004 remastered edition

Professional ratings
Review scores
Source	Rating
AllMusic	3/5 stars
Cross Rhythms	8/10 squares
Cross Rhythms (2004 remastered edition)	8/10 squares
Jesusfreakhideout.com	3/5 stars
Jesusfreakhideout.com (2004 remastered edition)	4/5 stars

Set It Off is the debut studio album by Canadian Christian rock band Thousand Foot Krutch. Influenced by the nu metal band Limp Bizkit, the album was described by AllMusic as a "knockout punch" in the Christian hardcore genre. Some of the songs came from their 1997 independent album, That's What People Do. Critics consider it to be a nu metal and rap metal album.

This is the last album to feature guitarist Dave Smith, who left the band in 2002, and the only album to feature drummer Geoff Laforet, who left the band in 2001.

== Track listing ==
All tracks are written by Trevor McNevan, Dave Smith, Joel Bruyere and Geoff Laforet.

No.	Title	Length
1.	"[Untitled]" (see notes)	1:01
2.	"Puppet"	3:25
3.	"Supafly"	3:40
4.	"When in Doubt"	3:27
5.	"Rhime Animal"	4:27
6.	"Unbelievable" (based on the EMF song "Unbelievable")	3:03
7.	"Up Comes Down"	3:22
8.	"Come Along"	3:23
9.	"Small Town"	6:54
10.	"Set It Off"	6:03
11.	"All the Way Live"	4:10
12.	"Lift It"	3:59

== Personnel ==
- Trevor McNevan, credited as "Lipsick" - vocals and rhythm guitar
- Dave Smith, credited as "The Thing" - lead guitar
- Joel Bruyere, credited as "Cheetah" - bass and acoustic guitars
- Geoff Laforet, credited as "Johnny Orbital" - drums
- Thousand Foot Krutch - producer, mixing, mastering, art direction
- DJ DOVE - executive producer, co-producer, mixing, turntables, samples, art direction, A&R
- Bryan LeBrun - recording engineer at Desert Moon Recordings - Anaheim, California, mixing, mastering
- Andrew Horrocks - recording engineer at A.M.E. Studios - Ontario, Canada

Additional Musicians

- Steve McCrumm - strings
- Ian Tanner - keyboards
- Christian Harvey - additional drums
- DJ Circa - turntables
- Principal Media Group Studios - design and layout
- Doug Macklin - artwork
- Shane from Boomerang Photography - photography
- All songs written by: T. McNevan, D. Smith, J. Bruyere, J. LaForet.

== Track listing (2004 version) ==
No.	Title	Length
1.	"Everyone Like Me"	3:15
2.	"Intro. (see notes) -"	1:01
3.	"Puppet"	3:29
4.	"Supafly"	3:41
5.	"When In Doubt"	3:27
6.	"Rhime Animal"	4:59
7.	"Unbelievable" (based on the EMF song of the same name)	3:03
8.	"Up Comes Down"	3:22
9.	"Come Along"	3:22
10.	"Small Town"	6:55
11.	"Set It Off"	6:02
12.	"All the Way Live"	4:12
13.	"Lift It"	3:57
14.	"Brother John"	5:50
15.	"Breather"	3:32
16.	"Sweet Unknown"	4:25
17.	"Moment of The Day"	4:08
18.	"The Alternative Song"	4:25

Tracks 6, 10, 11, 13–18 are from Thousand Foot Krutch's independent release That's What People Do

== Personnel (2004) ==
- Vocals and guitar: Trevor McNevan
- Bass guitar: Joel Bruyere
- Drums: Steve Augustine
- Track 1 Produced by: Gavin Brown and mixed by Scott Humphrey at The Chop Shop - Hollywood, California
- Tracks 2–13 Produced by: Thousand Foot Krutch
  - 2004 Remix by: JR McNeely at East Iris Studio - Nashville, Tennessee
- Tracks 14–18 Produced by: Thousand Foot Krutch with Andrew Horrocks at A.M.E. Studios - Kitchener, Ontario, Canada
- Mastered by: Troy Glessner at Spectre Mastering - Renton, Washington
- A & R: 'Brandon Ebel
- Art direction and design by: Asterik Studio - Seattle, Washington
- New band photography by: Kris McCaddon
- Archive band photography by: Miscellaneous
- All songs written by Trevor McNevan, Dave Smith, Joel Bruyere & Geoff Laforet © 2004 Thirsty Moon River Publishing (ASCAP), Teerawk Music Publishing (ASCAP/SOCAN), Pockethood Publishing (ASCAP/SOCAN), Spinning Audio Vortex (BMI) & Whatthewhat Music Publishing (BMI/SOCAN)
- (P) and © 2004 Tooth & Nail Records.

== Notes ==
- "Everyone Like Me" was recorded by the band in early 2004.
- [Untitled] on the original version and "Intro" on the 2004 version are the same song.
- "Rhime Animal", "Small Town", "Set It Off" and "Lift It" were remade for the 2004 version.
- Both "Supafly" and "Unbelievable" made it to the Top 5 on ChristianRock.Net. "Puppet" was a No. 1 at the same site.
- There is one music video for this album, for the song "Puppet". It features the band playing in an alley and also shows the shadows of two puppets against an orange sky, with one puppet chasing the other. Eventually the fleeing puppet escapes.

== Awards ==
In 2005, the 2004 version of the album was nominated for a Dove Award for Rock Album of the Year at the 36th GMA Dove Awards.
