= Citizen Soldier (band) =

American rock band from Salt Lake City, Utah

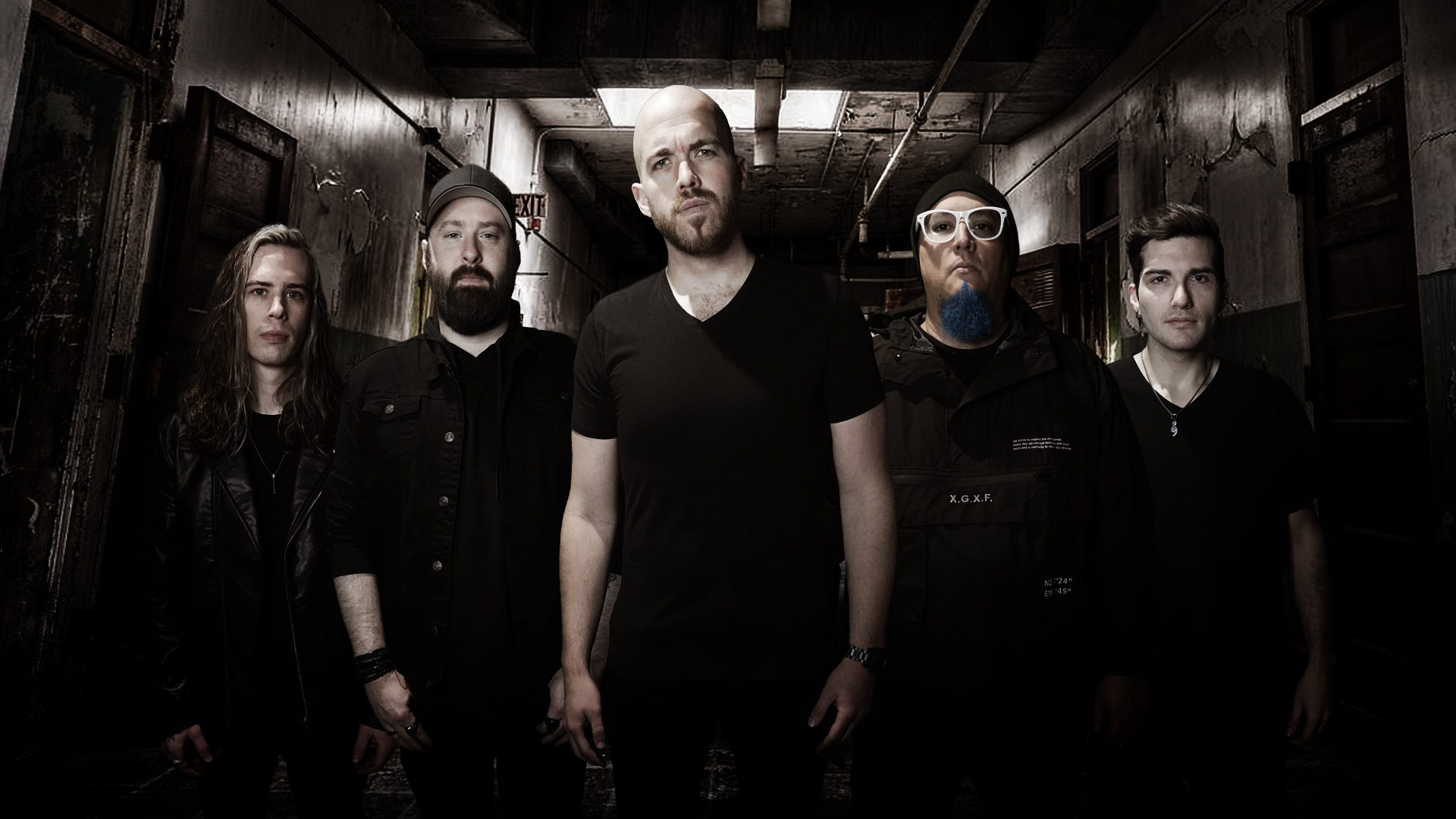
- Citizen Soldier members (left to right): Kooper Hanosky, Matt Duffney, Jake Segura, Wonitta Rivero, Kyle Persell

Background information
- Origin: Salt Lake City, Utah
- Genres: Alternative rock; post-grunge; alternative metal
- Years active: 2016–present
- Members: Jake Segura; Matt Duffney; Kooper Hanosky; Wonitta Rivero; Kyle Persell
- Past members: Tyler Nichols
- Website: www.citizensoldierband.com

Citizen Soldier is an American rock band from Salt Lake City, Utah. They were formed in a psychiatric hospital in 2016 when frontman Jake Segura wrote the lyrics for "Let It Burn" on a hospital napkin. They released their first single in 2017.

== History ==
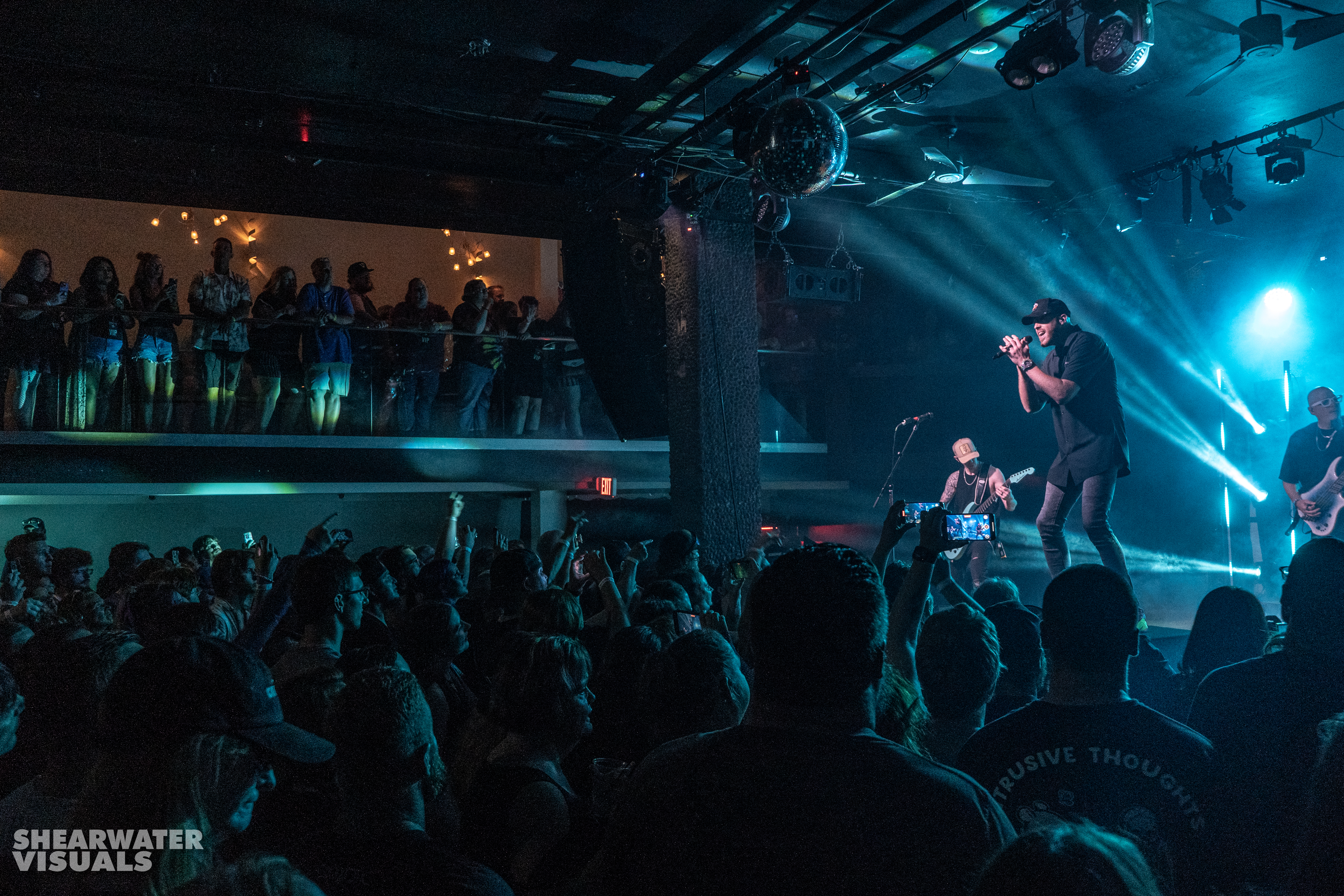
Citizen Soldier performing live at The Regency Live in 2025

Since their formation in 2016, the band discusses mental health issues through their music. They have stated that their mission is to fight stigma and provide a "group therapy dynamic." The band's name Citizen Soldier is the band's attempt to personify the "struggles being fought within," and the band's goal to "shine a light on the everyday struggles of those who feel overlooked and unappreciated."

In 2017, after multiple singles, the band initially released one EP before their first album, Relentless, in 2019. Their next album, Down the Rabbit Hole, was released in 2020, followed by the two-part album This Is Your Sign Part I in 2021 and This Is Your Sign Part II in 2022.

In May 2022, Citizen Soldier announced their fifth album, Scarecrow. The complete album was released on December 14, 2022.

The band typically releases the songs of albums as singles first before releasing them collectively as an album.

In 2023, they accompanied the band Smash Into Pieces on their tour through North America and Canada. Together, they recorded an acoustic version of the song "Six Feet Under" from Smash Into Pieces. In November, they released their sixth album ICU.

In November 2024, they released the album Icarus. In 2025, they released the album Family Heirlooms on November 12.

== Members ==
- Jake Segura – vocals
- Matt Duffney – guitar
- Kooper Hanosky – guitar
- Wonitta Rivero – bass, keys
- Kyle Persell – drums

== Discography ==
=== Albums ===
- Relentless (2019)
- Down The Rabbit Hole (2020)
- This Is Your Sign Part I (2021)
- This Is Your Sign Part II (2022)
- Scarecrow (2022)
- ICU (2023)
- Icarus (2024)
- Family Heirlooms (2025)
- Secret Songs - Vol. 1 (2026)

=== EPs ===
- Caroline (2017)
- ICU, B-Sides (2024)

=== Singles ===
List of singles
Title	Year	Peak chart positions		Album
Title	Year	US Hard Rock Digi.	US Hard Rock	Album
"Buried Alive"	2017	—	—	Caroline
"Let It Burn"	2017	—	—	Caroline
"15 Minutes of Fame"	2017	—	—	Caroline
"Soldier"	2017	—	—	Caroline
"Found"	2018	—	—	Non-album singles
"First Blood"	2018	—	—	Non-album singles
"Bitter"	2019	—	—	Non-album singles
"Cannibal"	2019	—	—	Relentless
"If These Scars Could Speak"	2019	—	—	Relentless
"Weight of the World"	2019	—	—	Relentless
"Sacred"	2020	—	—	Down the Rabbit Hole
"Hope It Haunts You"	2020	—	—	Down the Rabbit Hole
"Would Anyone Care"	2020	—	—	Down the Rabbit Hole
"Forever Damned"	2020	—	—	Down the Rabbit Hole
"The Cage"	2020	—	—	Down the Rabbit Hole
"Hallelujah (I'm Not Dead)"	2021	—	—	This Is Your Sign Pt I
"Stronger Than My Storm"	2021	—	—	This Is Your Sign Pt I
"Face to Face"	2021	—	—	This Is Your Sign Pt I
"Thank You for Hating Me"	2021	—	—	Non-album single
"Empty Cup"	2021	—	—	This Is Your Sign Pt I
"Bedroom Ceiling"	2021	—	—	Non-album single
"Hand Me Down"	2021	—	—	This Is Your Sign Pt I
"Unsaid"	2022	—	—	This Is Your Sign Pt II
"Irreplaceable"	2022	—	—	This Is Your Sign Pt II
"Numb to Everything"	2022	—	—	This Is Your Sign Pt II
"Waiting on the Sun"	2022	—	—	This Is Your Sign Pt II
"Wanted"	2022	—	—	This Is Your Sign Pt II
"Monster Made of Memories"	2022	—	—	Scarecrow
"Save Your Story"	2022	—	—	Scarecrow
"Fever"	2022	—	—	Scarecrow
"Easy's Never Been This Hard"	2022	—	—	Scarecrow
"This Is Not a Phase"	2022	—	—	Scarecrow
"Madhouse"	2022	—	—	Scarecrow
"Limit"	2022	—	—	Scarecrow
"Through Hell"	2023	—	—	Non-album single
"Afterlife"	2023	—	—	ICU
"My Own Miracle"	2023	—	—	ICU
"Broken Like Me"	2023	—	—	ICU
"Wired for Worthless"	2023	—	—	ICU
"Talk Me Down"	2023	—	—	ICU
"Strong for Somebody Else"	2023	—	—	ICU
"You Are Enough"	2023	—	—	ICU
"Wish I Could Cry"	2023	—	—	Non-album single
"Dead-End Life"	2024	—	—	Icarus
"Say Nothing"	2024	—	—	Non-album single
"Where Were You?"	2024	—	—	Icarus
"Victim or Survivor"	2024	—	—	Non-album single
"Be Somebody"	2024	—	—	The End Is Where We Begin: Reignited
"Rock Bottom"	2024	—	—	Icarus
"Heavy"	2024	5	21	Non-album single
"Fake Friends"	2024	—	—	Non-album single
"Letdown"	2024	—	—	Icarus
"Burden"	2024	5	—	Icarus
"The Liar"	2025	—	—	Family Heirlooms
"Figure Me Out"	2025	—	—	Family Heirlooms
"Inner Critic"	2025	—	—	Family Heirlooms
"Bulletproof"	2025	—	—	Family Heirlooms
"Better Than I Used To Be"	2025	—	—	Family Heirlooms
"Dead Butterflies"	2025	—	—	Family Heirlooms
"Underdog"	2026	—	—	Non-album single

=== Music Videos ===
Title	Year	Directors
"Buried Alive"	2017	Raji Barbir
"Caroline"	2017	Raji Barbir
"Cannibal"	2019	Cameron Jackson
"Stronger Than My Storm"	2021	Nick Sales
"Unsaid"	2022	Nick Sales
"Waiting on the Sun"	2022	Nick Sales
"Limit"	2022	Nick Sales

== Tours ==
• Acoustic Tour (2023)

• Group Therapy Tour (2024)

• Save Your Story Tour (2024)

• Thank You For Hating Me Tour (2024)

• The Semicolon Tour (2025)

• The HeartSupport Tour (2025)

• Secret Songs Tour (2025)

• European Tour (2025)

• Secret Songs Tour II (2026)
