= Oxygen: Inhale =

Studio album by Thousand Foot Krutch
- Released: August 26, 2014
- Genre: Christian rock; Christian metal; pop rock; post-grunge; alternative metal
- Length: 37:39
- Label: TFK Music Inc.; The Fuel Music
- Producer: Aaron Sprinkle; Trevor McNevan

Thousand Foot Krutch chronology
The End Is Where We Begin (2012)	Oxygen: Inhale (2014)	Exhale (2016)

Singles from Oxygen: Inhale
- 1. "Born This Way" Released: July 22, 2014; 2. "Untraveled Road" Released: January 30, 2015

Professional ratings
Review scores
Source	Rating
Bracket and Bracket	75/100
Jesusfreakhideout.com	3.5/5 stars 3/5 stars 4/5 stars

Oxygen: Inhale (stylized in all capitals as OXYGEN:INHALE) is the seventh studio album by Canadian rock band Thousand Foot Krutch. It was released on August 26, 2014, in the United States.

== Background ==
On March 27, 2014, the band announced that they will be recording the new album on April 21. In an interview at Rock on the Range, McNevan stated that the album would be released on August 26, 2014, under the title Oxygen: Inhale. The band launched a Pledge Music campaign to raise funds for the album in May. The first single from the album, "Born This Way", was released on July 22. The second single, titled "Untraveled Road" was released on August 6 on YouTube. On August 19, the entire album was released on iTunes First Play, a part of iTunes Radio.

== Track listing ==
All tracks are written by Steve Augustine, Joel Bruyere, Trevor McNevan.

No.	Title	Length
1.	"Like a Machine"	3:43
2.	"Untraveled Road"	3:55
3.	"Born This Way"	3:25
4.	"Set Me on Fire"	3:48
5.	"Give It to Me"	3:39
6.	"I See Red"	4:10
7.	"Light Up"	2:57
8.	"In My Room"	4:39
9.	"Oxygen"	3:51
10.	"Glow"	3:20
Total length:		37:39

== Personnel ==
- Trevor McNevan - producer, vocals, guitar, acoustic guitar
- Joel Bruyere - bass guitar
- Steve Augustine - drums, percussion
- Aaron Sprinkle - producer, keyboards, additional guitar
- Additional pianos, keys, strings, effects: Trevor McNevan and Aaron Sprinkle
- Slide guitar on "Born This Way" and electric leads on "Light Up": Shawn Tubbs
- Dobro on "Glow": Chad Jeffers
