= Move (Thousand Foot Krutch song) =

Single by Thousand Foot Krutch

from the album The Art of Breaking
- Released: August 22, 2005
- Recorded: 2004/2005
- Genre: Hard rock, nu metal
- Length: 3:28
- Label: Tooth & Nail

Thousand Foot Krutch singles chronology
"Absolute" (2005)	"Move" (2005)	"The Art of Breaking" (2006)

"Move" is the second single from Thousand Foot Krutch's third studio album, The Art of Breaking. Although "Move" received less Christian radio play than the first single, "Absolute", it did receive more mainstream radio play than "Absolute"; because of this, "Move" received a music video. "Move" charted at No. 16 on the Billboard charts.

== Music video ==
In the video, the band is shown playing in the cellar of an abandoned building. Also shown is a girl, who starts running once the song kicks in. The girl repeatedly bumps into various people and eventually ends up near where the band is playing. She then retraces her steps and finds that most of the people she ran into before now have some sort of metal implant. The audio in the video slightly varies from the album version. The difference is that in the beginning on the CD McNevan can be heard whispering in the song, but in the video he cannot. Also the chorus at the end of the song, in the video, is not repeated as often as it is in the CD version.

The video was directed by Brandon Dickerson and produced by Erik Press.

== Single ==
Promotional Single
No.	Title	Length
1.	"Move (radio edit)"	3:08
2.	"Move (album version)"	3:28

== Charts ==
Chart (2006)	Peak position
US Mainstream Rock (Billboard)	16

== Awards ==
The song was nominated for a Dove Award for Short Form Music Video of the Year at the 37th GMA Dove Awards.
