= Falls Apart (Thousand Foot Krutch song) =

Single by Thousand Foot Krutch

from the album The Flame in All of Us
- Released: February 5, 2008
- Recorded: 2007
- Genre: Alternative metal, post-grunge
- Length: 3:48
- Label: Tooth & Nail
- Songwriter(s): Trevor McNeaven
- Producer(s): Ken Andrews

Thousand Foot Krutch singles chronology
"What Do We Know?" (2005)	"Falls Apart" (2008)	"The Flame In All of Us" (2008)

"Falls Apart" is the first single taken from Thousand Foot Krutch's album The Flame in All of Us. It has received some success on rock radio; reaching No. 33 on the Mainstream Rock charts, as well as No. 4 on ChristianRock.net, a website devoted to Christian music.

The song is one of two off the album to receive a music video, the other being "Favorite Disease".

== Awards ==
In 2008, the song was nominations for a Dove Award for Short Form Music Video of the Year at the 39th GMA Dove Awards.

== Credits ==
- Trevor McNevan - vocals, guitar
- Joel Bruyere - bass guitar
- Steve Augustine - drums
- Ken Andrews - keyboards, programming
- Phil X - additional guitars
