= Fire It Up (Thousand Foot Krutch song) =

Single by Thousand Foot Krutch

from the album Welcome to the Masquerade
- Released: July 28, 2009
- Genre: Christian metal, alternative metal
- Length: 3:07
- Label: Tooth & Nail
- Songwriters: Steve Augustine, Joel Bruyere and Trevor McNevan

Thousand Foot Krutch singles chronology
"Forward Motion" (2009)	"Fire It Up" (2009)	"Already Home" (2010)

Alternative cover
- Radio Promo Cover

"Fire It Up" is the third single released by the Canadian rock band Thousand Foot Krutch from their fifth studio album Welcome to the Masquerade. It charted at No. 18 on active rock charts, No. 35 on the Billboard rock charts and No. 5 on Christianrock.net. The song is used in numerous promotions by sports teams, race drivers and in movies

== Promotion and use in media ==
- At least five hockey teams; the Hershey Bears, Nashville Predators, New York Islanders, Rockford Icehogs, and Ottawa Senators use "Fire It Up" either in pre-game warm-ups or for promo videos at their games.
- The Wisconsin Badgers men's hockey team uses "Fire It Up" as one of two pregame songs to get the crowd excited.
- "Fire It Up" is featured in the video games NHL 10, MX vs ATV Reflex, and is currently available as downloadable content for Rock Band and Rock Band 2.
- "Fire It Up" is the theme tune of the Backdraft monster truck, driven by Jeremy Slifko.
- "Fire It Up" is also the theme of the Axe monster truck, driven by Joe Foley.
- NASCAR uses the song in one of its advertisements.
- It was featured on the Versus Indycar Edmonton telecast in late July 2009.
- The song is also used in the G.I. Joe: The Rise of Cobra trailer. It is also featured in the 2009 film, Ice Castles.
- Fox Sports used the song on an NFL Promotion.
- Team Canada at the World Juniors Hockey Championship used it in a promo video before games.
- NFL Network used the song as the background music for their 2009 "Plays of the Year" segment.
- The song became the official song for Super Bowl XLIV.
- "Fire It Up" has been used by the MLB.

== Credits ==
- Trevor McNevan - vocals, guitar
- Joel Bruyere - bass
- Steve Augustine - drums
- Pete Stewart - additional guitar

== Music video ==
Trevor McNevan stated that a music video for the song, which will make it the first song from Welcome to the Masquerade to receive one, was in production. However, on May 9, 2010, he stated on his Facebook page that "we [TFK] shot one a while back, but hated it... so, it's on the fence there."

== Other information ==
- Carrie Underwood has stated that she is a fan of the band and especially "Fire It Up" and "Already Home."
- The guitar solo near the end of the song is played by Pete Stewart.

== Charts ==
Chart (2010)	Peak position
US Hot Rock & Alternative Songs (Billboard)	35
