= The Art of Breaking =

Studio album by Thousand Foot Krutch
- Released: July 19, 2005
- Genre: Christian rock; nu metal
- Length: 40:47
- Label: Tooth & Nail
- Producer: Arnold Lanni

Thousand Foot Krutch chronology
| Phenomenon (2003) | The Art of Breaking (2005) | The Flame in All of Us (2007) |

Professional ratings
Review scores
| Source | Rating |
|---|---|
| AllMusic | 3.5/5 stars |
| Cross Rhythms | 9/10 squares |
| Jesusfreakhideout.com | 3.5/5 stars |

The Art of Breaking is the third studio album by Christian rock band Thousand Foot Krutch that was released by Tooth & Nail Records in July 2005. The single Move received moderate mainstream success, reaching No. 16 on Billboard's mainstream rock charts in early 2006. The album has three singles: "Move", "Absolute" and "Breathe You In". Of these, only "Move" received a music video. The band has said that the girl on the album's cover is the girl in the video for "Move", as shown in a picture on their MySpace.

== Track listing ==
All tracks are written by Trevor McNevan, Joel Bruyere, Steve Augustine, and Arnold Lanni

| No. | Title | Length |
|---|---|---|
| 1. | "Absolute" | 3:19 |
| 2. | "Slow Bleed" | 3:14 |
| 3. | "The Art of Breaking" | 3:19 |
| 4. | "Stranger" | 3:48 |
| 5. | "Hurt" | 4:44 |
| 6. | "Hand Grenade" | 4:13 |
| 7. | "Move" | 3:28 |
| 8. | "Hit the Floor" | 3:48 |
| 9. | "Go" | 3:46 |
| 10. | "Make Me a Believer" | 2:49 |
| 11. | "Breathe You In" | 4:19 |
| Total length: | | 40:47 |

== Personnel ==
Thousand Foot Krutch

- Trevor McNevan – vocals, guitar
- Joel Bruyere – bass guitar
- Steve Augustine – drums

Additional personnel

- Arnold Lanni – producer, mixing, recording, keyboards
- Ziad "Zee" Al-Hillal – recording
- Angelo Caruso – recording
- Kenny Luong – additional engineering
- George Marino – mastering
- Phil X – guitar engineer
- Harry Hess – additional background vocals
- Adam Gontier of Three Days Grace – guest appearance on "Hurt" and "Go"
- Brandon Ebel – executive producer

== Awards ==
In 2006, the album was nominated for a Dove Award for Rock Album of the Year at the 37th GMA Dove Awards. The song "Move" was also nominated for Short Form Music Video of the Year.
