= Already Home (Thousand Foot Krutch song) =

Single by Thousand Foot Krutch

from the album Welcome to the Masquerade
- Released: January 6, 2010
- Recorded: 2009
- Genre: Christian rock, CCM
- Length: 4:30
- Label: Tooth & Nail
- Songwriter(s): Steve Augustine, Joel Bruyere and Trevor McNevan.

Thousand Foot Krutch singles chronology
"Fire It Up" (2009)	"Already Home" (2010)	"E for Extinction" (2010)

"Already Home" is the fourth single released by the Canadian Christian rock band Thousand Foot Krutch from their fifth Studio Album Welcome to the Masquerade. Carrie Underwood stated that she is a fan of the band and especially "Fire It Up" and "Already Home".

== Chart performance ==
The song charted at No. 35 on the Billboard Hot Christian Songs chart. In Canada, the song debuted at No. 99 on the Canadian Christian Songs chart.

== Personnel ==
- Trevor McNevan - vocals, guitar
- Joel Bruyere - bass
- Steve Augustine - drums
