= Luca Meazza =

Italian footballer

Personal information
- Full name: Luca Meazza
- Date of birth: 12 November 1965 (age 60)
- Place of birth: Milan, Italy
- Position: Defender

Youth career
- Inter

Senior career*
Years	Team	Apps	(Gls)
1983–1984	Inter	1	(0)
1984–1985	→ Taranto (loan)	14	(0)
1985	Inter	0	(0)
1985–1986	→ Cesena (loan)	13	(0)
1986–1989	Alessandria	57	(0)
1990–1991	Sant'Angelo	8	(0)
Total		93	(0)
- * Club domestic league appearances and goals

Luca Meazza (born 12 November 1965 in Milan) is an Italian retired footballer who played as a central defender. He played for the Inter youth teams and made his debut in Serie A with the nerazzurri senior side on 15 April 1984 against Avellino. He was then loaned to Taranto and Cesena in Serie B. He continued his career in the lower divisions of Italian football for several years before retiring in 1991.

== Career ==
- 1983–1984 Inter 1 (0)
- 1984–1985 → Taranto (loan) 14 (0)
- 1985 Inter 0 (0)
- 1985–1986 → Cesena (loan) 13 (0)
- 1986–1989 Alessandria 57 (0)
- 1990–1991 Sant'Angelo 8 (0)
