= Thousand Foot Krutch =

Canadian Christian rock band

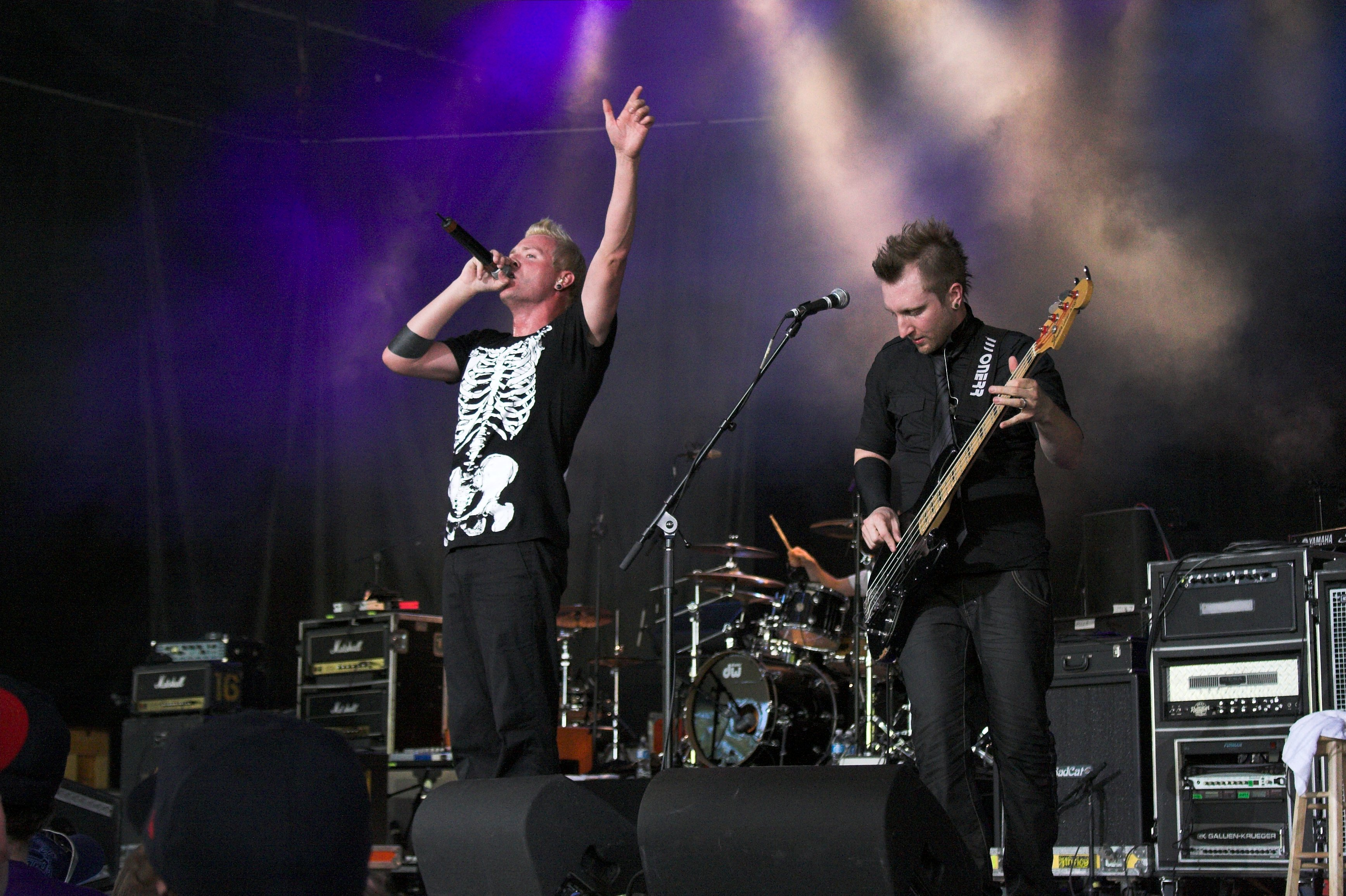
- Thousand Foot Krutch in June 2009. From left to right: Trevor McNevan and Joel Bruyere.

Background information
- Also known as: Oddball (1995–1996)
- Origin: Peterborough, Ontario, Canada
- Genres: Christian rock; Christian metal; hard rock; nu metal; rap metal
- Years active: 1995–2017, 2024 (currently on indefinite hiatus) (Note: In 2023 and 2024, McNevan and Bruyere collaborated with long-time producer Aaron Sprinkle and various artists to record and release a new remix version of 2012 studio album The End Is Where We Begin.)
- Labels: DJD; Tooth & Nail; TFK Music Inc.; Hassle
- Members: Trevor McNevan; Joel Bruyere; Steve Augustine
- Past members: Neil Sanderson; Dave Smith; Tim Baxter; Christian Harvey; Geoff Laforet
- Website: thousandfootkrutch.com

Thousand Foot Krutch (often abbreviated TFK) is a Canadian Christian rock band formed in Peterborough, Ontario, in 1995. The band released ten studio albums, two live albums, and three remix albums. The core members consist of founding member Trevor McNevan (vocals, guitar), as well as, Steve Augustine (drums), and Joel Bruyere (bass, backing vocals).

After forming, Thousand Foot Krutch would go on to sell more than 1.1 million albums, along with reaching No. 1 on the Billboard Hard Rock Albums Chart twice.

== History ==
=== Early years (1995–2003) ===
Trevor McNevan formed the band in his hometown of Peterborough, Ontario, a city northeast of Toronto, with his childhood friend Joel Bruyere and drummer Steve Augustine. McNevan's first band was Oddball, and featured Dave Smith on guitar, Tim Baxter on bass and McNevan's good friend, Three Days Grace's Neil Sanderson, on drums. Oddball recorded only one album, Shutterbug, which was released in 1995. The band's name was conceived by McNevan "symbolizing the point in our lives that we realize we can't make it on our own strength". He has written and released seven albums with Thousand Foot Krutch to date and another four with his side project FM Static.

Shutterbug was released by Trevor McNevan in 1995 under the band name Oddball. McNevan had friends Dave Smith (guitar), Tim Baxter (bass), and Neil Sanderson (drums), play on the album. There were 27 songs on the album, the first half rock, the second half hip-hop. McNevan recorded it at Barry Haggarty's studio in his home town of Peterborough, Ontario, Canada. He worked at McDonald's and other jobs to pay for the studio time. The song "Lift It" first appeared here and was later re-recorded for Thousand Foot Krutch's first release, That's What People Do, and appeared again on Set It Off.

That's What People Do was written the year McNevan started TFK in 1997. It was released independently in 1998 and is out of print. It sold over 5,000 copies. TFK climbed the ladder of local notoriety throughout Ontario and abroad. Reaching the ears of Ontario commercial radio, CKWF 101.5 FM in their home town of Peterborough added "Rhyme Animal", the band's first single from their independent recording, to their rotation. It clicked with listeners and within two months ended up being one of the five most requested songs of the year.

In 1999, TFK was chosen by 7 Ball Magazine as one of the top 25 bands in North America. They were also awarded "Best Indie Recording" and McNevan awarded "Vocalist of the Year" by the readers of The Wire Magazine. They were then awarded "Band of the Year" at the 2000 Wire Awards. They were also voted as the No. 1 band of the millennium on 100.3 FM in Barrie, Ontario.

Set It Off was released on November 14, 2000. It was the group's first indie label release. Though the sound of the album was distinct in its heavily hip-hop influenced nu metal, a few songs from the record (including "Puppet" and "Supafly") impacted at both secular and Christian radio. The band toured it extensively across North America and ended up garnering much label attention by selling 85,000 copies of the indie release out of their van. The band also printed a limited edition, "pre-release" version of Set It Off sold only at their release party at The Gordon Best Theatre in Peterborough, Ontario for their local fans. TFK toured with Finger Eleven, Econoline Crush, Treble Charger, the Tea Party, Matthew Good Band, Gob, Sum 41 and others. Three Days Grace, which was a cover band at that time, was TFK's regular support act. McNevan helped with recordings of Three Days Grace's demo album. He is also featured on their song "This Movie" from this album. Around this same time, Dave Smith left the group, making McNevan the only original member. Smith was replaced with Myke Harrison, who parted ways about a year later. After Dave Smith's departure, McNevan began writing all the guitar lines and the band has used a live guitar player instead of officially replacing him.

Track seven from this album, "Unbelievable" – a cover of the EMF song of the same name – appeared on the soundtrack for the 2010 film Just Wright.

=== Tooth & Nail years (2003–2012) ===
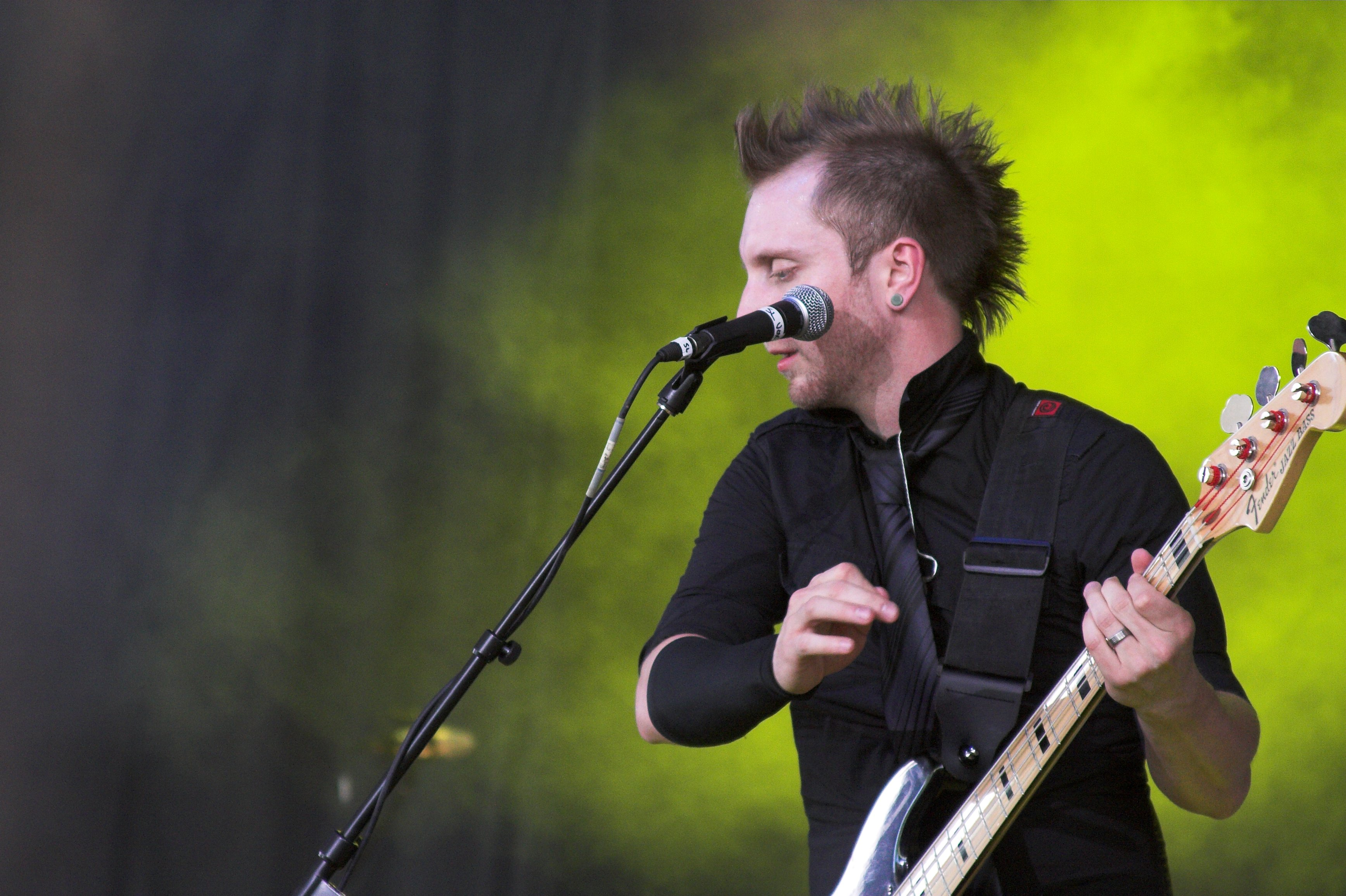
Bassist Joel Bruyere

In 2003, the band signed with Seattle-based Tooth & Nail Records and released their second full-length album, Phenomenon. Though something of a departure from the rap-heavy sound of Set it Off, Phenomenon still relied on McNevan's rhythmic vocals, albeit with a solid modern hard rock sound. It was well received, and spawned four radio singles, including "Rawkfist". The album sold 200,000 units making it one of the best-selling albums in Tooth & Nail's history. They continued this success with the 2004 re-release of Set it Off through Tooth & Nail, allowing for a larger print run and adding six songs, including five from "That's What People Do", and one new song "Everyone Like Me", produced by Gavin Brown.

At this time, McNevan and Augustine started a side band called FM Static, which differentiated from TFK with its pop-punk/pop-rock sound, with the overall tone being more lighthearted. FM Static scored numerous No. 1 songs, including their songs "Crazy Mary", and "Something to Believe In". In 2004, TFK toured with Kutless on the "Sea of Faces" tour alongside Falling Up and as FM Static.

On July 19, 2005, they released their third full-length album The Art of Breaking, produced by Arnold Lanni. The album makes almost a complete break from the nu metal sound of Phenomenon, focusing more on heavy elements. It is the first album to feature short guitar solos. "Move" peaked at No. 16 on the Billboard Mainstream Rock chart early 2006. Other singles included "Absolute" and "Breathe You In", which was released to alternative radio and was one of the band's first slower songs. During this time the band toured extensively.

In 2006, McNevan became involved with TobyMac and helped him write the song "Ignition" found on Portable Sounds. The song has been used in media placements including Monday Night Football and NASCAR. Because of this, in the early 2007, the band was part of the TobyMac Portable Sounds tour. The tour was such a success that Toby asked them to do the year-end tour as well.

After working in the studio with producer Ken Andrews they released The Flame in All of Us on September 18, 2007, with a move to a more mainstream rock sound, with some heavy influences from bands such as fellow Canadian artists Our Lady Peace and other metal bands of the time. The album includes the singles "Falls Apart", "What do we Know?", "Favorite Disease", and "The Flame in All of Us". On January 20, 2008, "The Flame in All of Us" became the 1000th song to make it on the ChristianRock.Net Top 30 Chart. The next tour was in early 2008 with Skillet and Decyfer Down. After a lengthy summer playing festivals and one-offs, they were included in the first Creation Festival: The Tour that consisted of nine bands: Kutless, Pillar, KJ-52, Fireflight, Worth Dying For, Run Kid Run, Esterlyn, Capital Lights, and themselves. They were asked to headline three tour dates, but declined. They also recorded the Christmas song "Jingle Bell Rawk" for the X Christmas compilation Christmas album, compiled by Tooth & Nail Records. For Welcome to the Masquerade, the band reunited with Aaron Sprinkle to co-produce this album, with Emery's Matt Carter assisting and Randy Staub mixing. The song "Fire It Up" was included in video games such as EA Sports NHL 10, and in the G.I. Joe: The Rise of Cobra film trailer. The album was released on September 8, 2009, and peaked at No. 35 on the Billboard 200. In mid-2009, McNevan underwent emergency surgery on his appendix, causing the band to cancel at Creation West Festival. He returned to play shows a week later. The band appeared at other festivals that year, including their debut appearance at Soulfest. They announced a year-end tour to support the new album. They also appeared on Creation Festival: The Tour again, this time with Jars of Clay, Audio Unplugged, B.Reith, FM Static, and This Beautiful Republic. They were later involved with a Christmas holiday show with Thirty Seconds to Mars, Flyleaf, After Midnight Project, and The Veer Union. On September 8, 2009, TFK's three albums, Phenomenon, The Art of Breaking, and The Flame in All of Us were re-released as a three-CD set: Deja Vu: The Thousand Foot Krutch Anthology. They toured with Breaking Benjamin, Chevelle, and Red in March 2010.

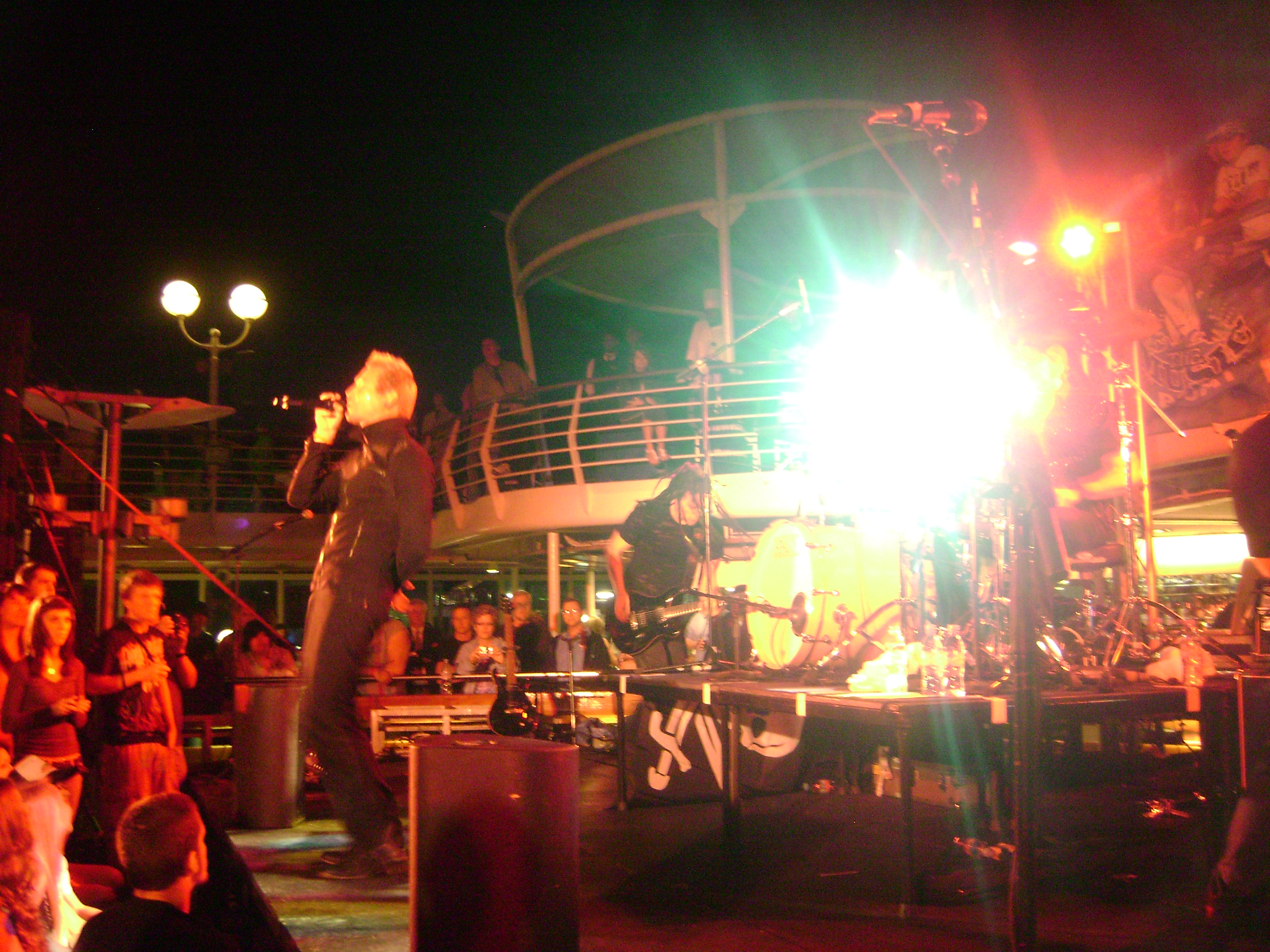
TFK on the Music Boat 2010

In the first week of April 2010, "Fire it Up" was released in the Rock Band music store to be used in Rock Band 2. On April 19, The Detroit Red Wings used "The Invitation" and "Welcome to the Masquerade" during the pre-game introduction. On May 11, 2010, McNevan announced on his personal Facebook page: "We [TFK] covered "The Heat Miser Song" from the old classic Christmas special, gonna do one with FM too, but that's a surprise..." referring to their upcoming appearance on the album X-Christmas 2 by Tooth & Nail Records. He also stated that a live DVD was planned for the very near future and was to be recorded at the May 28 at YC Alberta event at Rexall Place. During the 2010 NBA playoffs, "Move" was used by ABC. In 2010, TFK performed at Creation Festival: The Tour Presents the Welcome to the Masquerade Fall Tour. They headlined the tour, which also featured Disciple and Ivoryline, with Decyfer Down replacing Disciple during the last week of the tour. The band also stated that they started writing tracks for a new record.

In January 2011, TFK joined the Rock and Worship Roadshow national tour headlined by MercyMe. On June 7, 2011, they released a live album and DVD: Live at the Masquerade. On September 10, 2011, they headlined at the First Love Festival in Buena Vista, New Jersey along with Decyfer Down, Remedy Drive, Addison Road, Dave Pettigrew and Compelled.

=== Post-label and first hiatus (2012–2017, 2023–2024) ===
The End Is Where We Begin was released on April 17, 2012.

On November 29, 2011, they announced that they would be leaving Tooth & Nail Records to release The End Is Where We Begin independently and turned to crowdfunding to release the album. The song "War of Change" was made available for free download in early December.

"War of Change" was the theme song for the 2012 edition of WWE Over the Limit.

On October 15, 2013, the band released Made in Canada: The 1998-2010 Collection, a fourteen-track collection featuring two new songs, "Searchlight" and "Complicate You".

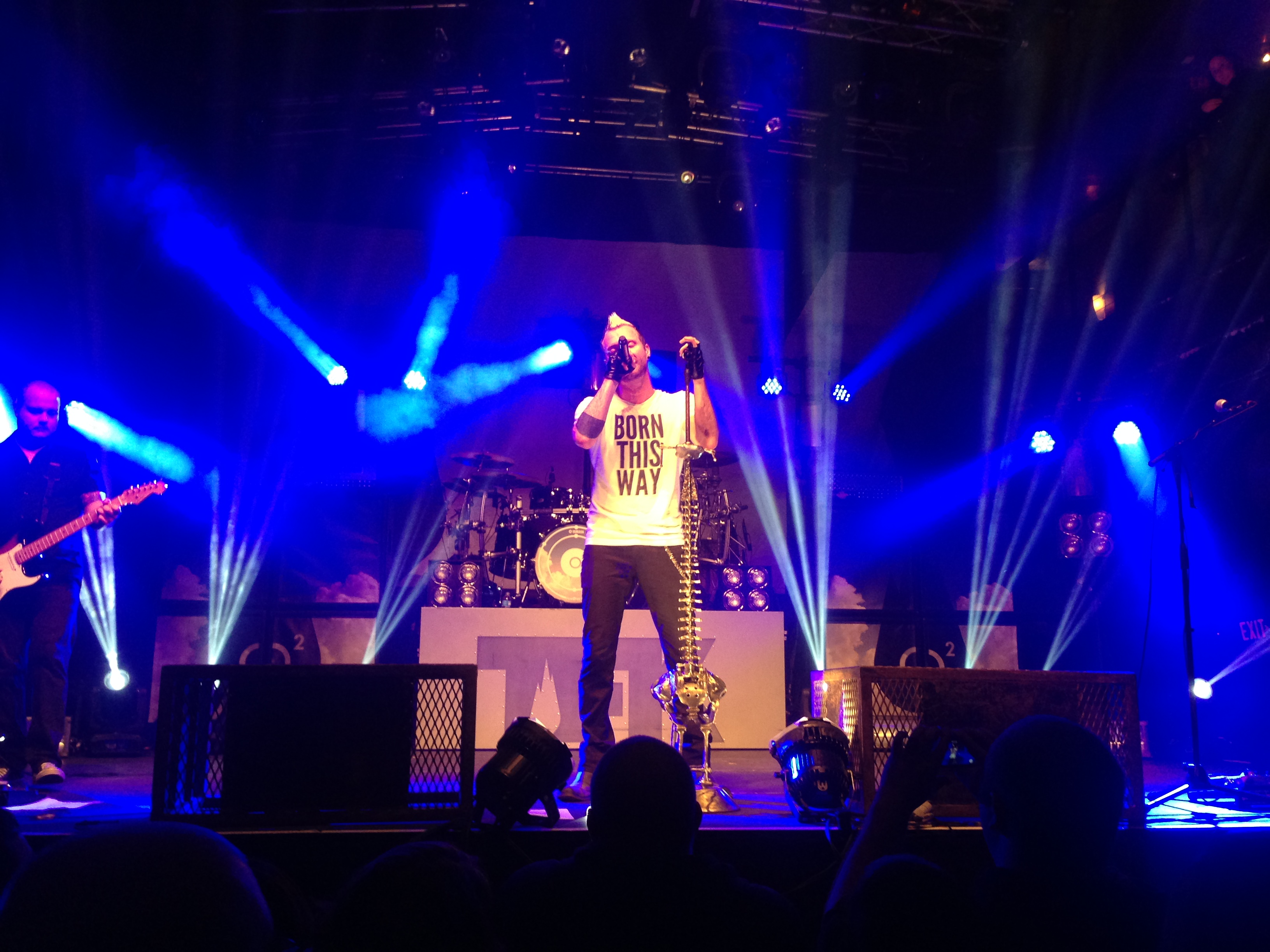
TFK in Minneapolis, Mill City Nights, October 8, 2014

The band launched another crowdfunding campaign to raise funds for OXYGEN:INHALE in May 2014. The first single from the album, "Born This Way", was released on July 22. The second single, "Untraveled Road", was released on August 6 on YouTube.

For live performances in September and October 2015, Joshua Sturm, husband of former Flyleaf vocalist Lacey Sturm, filled-in for Joel Bruyere who had been hospitalized due to a collapsed lung.

Three singles were released in advance of the release of their follow-up, Exhale: "Born Again" on December 11, 2015, "Incomplete" on February 1, 2016, and "Running with Giants" on February 25, 2016. The album itself was released on June 17, 2016 and debuted at No. 34 on the US Billboard 200, selling 14,000 copies. On September 15, 2017, The band released a second live album, Untraveled Roads, as a CD and DVD combo pack. After releasing the live album in 2017, TFK entered an indefinite hiatus to focus more on their families, with Trevor McNevan working on a hip-hop project in the meantime.

In 2023, Thousand Foot Krutch announced a new remix version of 2012 studio album The End Is Where We Begin, having been given the name "Reignited" for the new version. Collaborating with several of their musical peers, TFK released the single "War Of Change" with Adelitas Way in July 2023, "Down" with New Medicine in August 2023, "So Far Gone" with Art of Dying in October 2023, "I Get Wicked" with Red in March 2024, and "Be Somebody" with Citizen Soldier in April 2024. The Reignited album was released on July 26, 2024.

=== Transition to Teerawk and second indefinite hiatus ===
In August 2025, band frontman Trevor McNevan shared on the Joel Martin Mastery Podcast that under his stage name Teerawk, he is working on a new album called The Sound of Awakening. The album will feature McNevan singing about various situations in his personal life, with vocals having been recorded during those moments. Originally developed as a personal project, McNevan decided to transform it into a public solo project:

[The album turned into] what would [have effectively been] the new TFK record—same songwriter, voice, and guitarist. ... It's a very personal record. ... In my heart, it didn't feel right about trying to release it as TFK. I know on a business level that [it obviously doesn't make] a ton of sense, but [releasing under TFK] wasn't what felt right to me. From now on, all the music that I release is going to be released under Teerawk.

On September 9, 2025, Thousand Foot Krutch posted to their Facebook page official confirmation regarding indefinite hiatus, clarifying that "right now, as Thousand Foot Krutch, we don't have any plans for new TFK music."

== Members ==
Current lineup

- Trevor McNevan – vocals, guitar (1995–present- currently on hiatus)
- Joel Bruyere – bass guitar, backing vocals (1999–present- currently on hiatus)
- Steve Augustine – drums (2001–present- currently on hiatus)

Former

- Neil Sanderson – drums (1995–1997)
- Tim Baxter – bass guitar (1995–1998)
- Dave Smith – lead guitar (1995–2002)
- Christian Harvey – drums (1997–1999)
- Geoff "Johnny Orbital" Laforet – drums (1999–2001)

Touring

- Andrew Welch – lead guitar (2012–2017), backing vocals (2014–2017) – currently on hiatus
- Paul Pedosiuk – bass guitar (1998–1999)
- Myke Harrison – lead guitar (2002–2003)
- Jamie Aplin – lead guitar, backing vocals (2003–2007)
- Nick Baumhardt – lead guitar, backing vocals, keyboards (2007–2010)
- Joshua Sturm – bass (August and September 2015)

Session

- Aaron Sprinkle – keyboards and additional guitars (Phenomenon, Welcome to the Masquerade, The End Is Where We Begin, Oxygen: Inhale, Exhale)
- Arnold Lanni – keyboards (The Art of Breaking)
- Ken Andrews – keyboards (The Flame in All of Us)
- Phil X – additional guitars (The Art of Breaking, The Flame in All of Us, Exhale)
- Randy Torres – additional guitars (Welcome to the Masquerade)
- Pete Stewart – additional guitar on "Fire it Up" (Welcome to the Masquerade)
- Charlotte Martin – backing vocals on "Inhuman" (The Flame in All of Us)
- Adam Gontier – additional vocals on "Hurt", "Go", "Absolute" (The Art of Breaking) and "Let the Sparks Fly - 2023" (The End Is Where We Begin: Reignited)
- Ian Tanner – keyboards (That's What People Do, Set It Off)

Official Timeline

Touring Timeline

== Discography ==
- Shutterbug (as Oddball) (1995)
- That's What People Do (1997)
- Set It Off (2000)
- Phenomenon (2003)
- The Art of Breaking (2005)
- The Flame in All of Us (2007)
- Welcome to the Masquerade (2009)
- The End Is Where We Begin (2012)
- Oxygen: Inhale (2014)
- Exhale (2016)

== Awards and recognition ==
Gospel Music Association Canada Covenant Awards

Year	Award	Result
2005	Artist of the Year	Won
2005	Group of the Year	Won
2005	Modern Rock Album of the Year (The Art of Breaking)	Won
2006	Video of the Year ("Move")	Won
2008	Group of the Year	Nominated
2008	Hard Music Album of the Year (The Flame in All of Us)	Nominated
2008	Hard Music Song of the Year ("Falls Apart")	Nominated
2010	Rock Album of the Year (Welcome to the Masquerade)	Won
2010	Rock Song of the Year ("Forward Motion")	Won
2010	Hard Music Song of the Year ("Bring Me to Life")	Won

GMA Dove Awards

Year	Award	Result
2004	Rock Album of the Year (Phenomenon)	Nominated
2005	Rock Album of the Year (Set It Off)	Nominated
2006	Rock Album of the Year (The Art of Breaking)	Nominated
2006	Short Form Music Video of the Year ("Move")	Nominated
2008	Short Form Music Video of the Year ("Falls Apart")	Nominated
2010	Rock Album of the Year (Welcome to the Masquerade)	Nominated
2010	Rock Song of the Year ("Bring Me to Life")	Nominated
2013	Rock Album of the Year (The End Is Where We Begin)	Nominated

Juno Awards

Year	Award	Result
2005	Contemporary Christian/Gospel Album of the year (Phenomenon)	Nominated
2006	Contemporary Christian/Gospel Album of the year (The Art of Breaking)	Nominated
2008	Contemporary Christian/Gospel Album of the year (The Flame in All of Us)	Nominated
2010	Contemporary Christian/Gospel Album of the year (Welcome to the Masquerade)	Nominated
2013	Contemporary Christian/Gospel Album of the year (The End Is Where We Begin)	Nominated

Shai Awards (formerly The Vibe Awards)

Year	Award	Result
2004	Hard Music Album of the Year (Phenomenon)	Won

Other

- TFK won Taco Bell's "Feed the Beat" competition in 2008 along with Fireflight and Hit The Lights, they played the Winter X Games in Aspen with ESPN/Taco Bell.
