= Rawkfist =

Single by Thousand Foot Krutch

from the album Phenomenon
- Released: January 26, 2004
- Recorded: 2003
- Genre: Nu metal, rap metal
- Length: 3:03
- Label: Tooth & Nail
- Songwriters: Trevor McNevan, Steve Augustine and Joel Bruyere

Thousand Foot Krutch singles chronology
"Phenomenon" (2003)	"Rawkfist" (2004)	"Bounce" (2005)

"Rawkfist" (pronounced "rock fist") is a song by the Canadian rock band Thousand Foot Krutch. It is the fifth track from their third album Phenomenon (2003), and it was released as the album's second single on January 26, 2004. ESPN Sports Center chose it to be played in the Ultimate Highlight sequences on their program. It was featured on the Smallville season 3 episode titled "Velocity".

== Music video ==
The music video for the song features the band performing beneath a freeway overpass with unique special effects, such as Jamie Aplin's hand freezing when the music stops and starts moving again after vocals come in. Also the area around the band will change from a bright room to a dark blue tunnel. The change is initiated by a flash of light emitted from McNevan's hand.

== Personnel ==
- Trevor McNevan - vocals and guitar
- Joel Bruyere - bass
- Steve Augustine - drums
- Jamie Aplin - guitar (music video only)

Although the guitar credits go to McNevan on the recording, the song's music video features the band's touring guitarist.

== Charts ==
- In 2004 "Rawkfist" peaked at No. 28 on the Billboard US mainstream rock charts, it also peaked on the Active Rock Charts at No. 23 and finished the year at number No. 72.
