= Phenomenon (Thousand Foot Krutch album) =

Studio album by Thousand Foot Krutch
- Released: September 30, 2003
- Studio: Compound Recording (Seattle, WA); Metalworks Recording (Mississauga, ON, Canada)
- Genre: Christian rock; nu metal
- Length: 37:12
- Label: Tooth & Nail
- Producer: Aaron Sprinkle; Thousand Foot Krutch

Thousand Foot Krutch chronology
Set It Off (2000)	Phenomenon (2003)	The Art of Breaking (2005)

Singles from Phenomenon
- 1. "Phenomenon" Released: 2003; 2. "Rawkfist" Released: 2003; 3. "Bounce" Released: April 1, 2003; 4. "This Is a Call" Released: 2004

Phenomenon is the second studio album by Christian rock band Thousand Foot Krutch, being their first project on Tooth & Nail Records. Inspired by acts like Linkin Park, Papa Roach, and P.O.D., Phenomenon presents a fusion of nu metal and alternative rock. Having been influenced by band frontman Trevor McNevan's "faith and life," the album's lyrics frequently explore Christian faith and contemporary issues from a Christian worldview. The album was released on September 30, 2003.

== Reception ==
Professional ratings
Review scores
Source	Rating
AllMusic	4/5 stars
Cross Rhythms	8/10 squares
Jesusfreakhideout.com	4/5 stars
NOW Magazine	3/5 stars

- "Rawkfist" entered the top 40 on US mainstream rock radio.
- On ChristianRock.net, both "Phenomenon" and "Rawkfist" reached No. 1. Phenomenon was its 14th top song for 2003, and Rawkfist was its 11th top song for 2004.

== Track listing ==
All songs written by Trevor McNevan, Steve Augustine, and Joel Bruyere.

Two versions of the single "Rawkfist" were produced. The first is the album version, being 2:40 in length, and the second is a longer radio edit version, being 3:03 in length. Originally found on a promotional CD, the radio edit version was used for the "Rawkfist" music video, along with being selected for the 2013 Made in Canada compilation album.

Album release
No.	Title	Length
1.	"Phenomenon"	2:59
2.	"Step to Me"	3:00
3.	"Last Words"	2:48
4.	"This Is a Call"	3:49
5.	"Rawkfist"	2:40
6.	"Faith, Love and Happiness"	2:54
7.	"I Climb"	3:24
8.	"Quicken"	2:51
9.	"New Design"	3:29
10.	"Bounce"	3:06
11.	"Ordinary"	3:09
12.	"Break the Silence"	3:03
Total length:		37:12

== Personnel ==
Credits are adapted from the album's liner notes.

Thousand Foot Krutch

- Trevor McNevan – vocals, guitar
- Steve Augustine – drums
- Joel Bruyere – bass guitar

Technical

- Aaron Sprinkle – production, engineering, additional guitars
- Latif Tayour – engineering
- J. R. McNeely – mixing (1–2, 4–7, 9–12)
- Ben Grosse – mixing (3, 8)
- Jason Corsaro – drum engineering
- Zach Hodges – assistant mixing
- Steve Chahley – drum assistant
- Brandon Ebel – executive producer

Artwork

- Asterik Studio (Seattle, WA) – art direction and design (Note: The man featured on the cover art is Don Clark, co-founder of Asterik Studio and former guitarist of Demon Hunter.)
- David Johnson – band photography

Management

- James Hodgin (Dryve Artist Management, LLC)
