= Manafest discography =

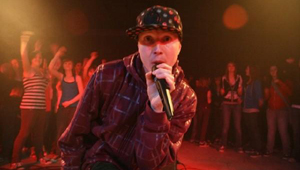
- Studio albums: 11
- Extended plays: 3
- Live albums: 1
- Singles: 55
- Music videos: 38

This is the discography of Canadian Christian rapper and rock artist Manafest. He has released eleven studio albums, three EPs, one live album, fifty five singles and has made thirty eight music videos.

== Albums ==
=== Studio albums ===
List of studio albums, with selected chart positions and certifications
Title	Album details	Peak chart positions	
Title	Album details	US Christ.	US Heat.
My Own Thing	Released: December 2, 2003; Label: Self-released; Format: CD, digital download	—	—
Epiphany	Released: July 19, 2005; Label: BEC; Format: CD, music download	—	—
Glory	Released: September 26, 2006; Label: BEC; Format: CD, music download	—	—
Citizens Activ	Released: June 24, 2008; Label: BEC; Format: CD, music download	—	—
The Chase	Released: March 30, 2010; Format: CD, music download; Label: BEC/Uprok Records	—	—
Fighter	Released: April 10, 2012; Label: BEC/Universal; Format: CD, music download	—	—
The Moment	Released: August 5, 2014; Label: BEC; Format: CD, music download	14	11
Reborn	Released: October 10, 2015; Label: Self-released; Format: CD, music download	34	20
Stones	Released: July 21, 2017; Label: Self-released; Format: CD, music download	—	—
This Is Not the End	Released: December 13, 2019; Label: Self-released; Format: CD, music download	—	—
I Run with Wolves	Released: May 6, 2022; Label: Self-released; Format: CD, music download	—	—
Learning How to Be Human	Released: 2024; Label: Self-released; Format: CD, music download	—	—
Silent Beast	Released: 2024; Label: Self-released; Format: CD, music download	—	—
Walking into Fire	Released: 2025; Label: Self-released; Format: CD, music download	—	—
Sleep Walker Awake	Released: 2026; Label: Self-released; Format: CD, music download	—	—

=== Live albums ===
Name	Details	Peak album charts
Name	Details	CAN
Live in Concert	Released June 7, 2011; Label: BEC; Format: DVD, CD, music download	84

=== Remix albums ===
Name	Details	Peak album charts
Name	Details	US Heat.
Stones Reloaded	Released September 21, 2018; Label: Self-released; Format: CD, music download	21

=== EPs ===
Name	Details
Misled Youth	Released: October 4, 2001; Label: Self-released; Format: CD, Music download
Avalanche - No Plan B	Released: September 1, 2010; Label: Self-released; Format: Music download
Manafest Presents Stories Since Seventy Nine	Released: August 20, 2012; Label: Self-released; Format: Music download
Powerful	Released: May 9, 2025; Label: Self-released; Format: Music download

== Compilation inclusions ==
- Hip Hope Hits 2006, "Let It Go" and "What I Got to Say" (Gotee, 2005)
- Launch: Ignition, "Let It Go" (CMC, 2005)
- Hip Hope Hits 2007, "Rodeo" (Gotee, 2006)
- Launch: Starting Line, "Style" (CMC, 2006)
- 27th Annual Covenant Hits, "Let It Go" (CMC, 2006)
- Hip Hope Hits 2008, "Bounce" (Gotee, 2007)
- Launch: Inferno, "Out of Time" (CMC, 2007) (bonus online download)
- Canada Rocks, "Impossible" (CMC, 2008)
- GMA Canada presents 30th Anniversary Collection, "Bounce" (CMC, 2008)
- Canadian Hit, "No Plan B" (CMC, 2010)
- Christmastime All Year, "California Christmas" (BEC, 2013)

== Singles ==
Year	Song	Peak chart positions			Album
Year	Song	US Main. Rock	US Christ	CR.net	Album
2005	"Skills"	—	—	1	Epiphany
2007	"Impossible" (featuring Trevor McNevan)	—	—	1	Glory
2007	"Runaway"	—	—	—	Glory
2007	"Bounce"	—	—	—	Glory
2008	"So Beautiful" (featuring Trevor McNevan)	—	—	1	Citizens Activ
2008	"4-3-2-1"	—	—	—	Citizens Activ
2008	"Steppin' Out"	—	—	3	Citizens Activ
2008	"Good Day"	—	—	—	Citizens Activ
2010	"Avalanche"	—	41	3	The Chase
2010	"No Plan B" (Solo or with Kenta Koie)	—	—	1	The Chase
2010	"Bring the Ruckus"	—	—	5	The Chase
2010	"Renegade" (featuring Trevor McNevan)	—	—	2	The Chase
2010	"Fire in the Kitchen" (featuring Trevor McNevan)	—	—	1	The Chase
2010	"Every Time You Run" (featuring Trevor McNevan)	—	—	—	The Chase
2012	"Fighter"	—	—	1	Fighter
2012	"Throw It Away"	—	—	1	Fighter
2012	"Human"	—	50	2	Fighter
2012	"Pushover"	—	—	3	Fighter
2012	"Never Let You Go"	—	45	—	Fighter
2013	"Overboard"	—	38	3	Stories Since Seventy Nine
2013	"California Christmas"	—	—	4	Christmas All Year
2014	"Edge of My Life"	—	48	1	The Moment
2014	"Diamonds" (featuring Trevor McNevan)	—	48	4	The Moment
2014	"Paradise"	—	—	—	The Moment
2015	"My Way"	—	—	—	The Moment
2015	"Let You Drive"	—	39	—	Reborn
2015	"Let Go" (featuring Dave Stevall)	—	—	—	Reborn
2015	"Reborn" (featuring The Drawing Room)	—	53	—	Reborn
2015	"Shine On" (featuring Trevor McNevan)	—	—	1	Reborn
2015	"Army"	—	39	—	Reborn
2016	"Won't Give Up"	—	—	—	Stones
2017	"Stones"	39	20	1	Stones
2017	"House of Cards"	37	21	—	Stones
2017	"Blow You Away"	—	—	—	Stones
2018	"Firestarter"	—	20	—	Stones
2018	"Coming Back"	—	—	—	Stones
2019	"Come Back Home" (featuring Trevor McNevan)	—	—	—	This Is Not the End
2019	"This Is Not the End"	—	—	—	This Is Not the End
2019	"Plan For Me" (featuring Melanie Greenwood)	—	—	—	This Is Not the End
2019	"Born for This" (featuring Max Manon)	—	—	—	This Is Not the End
2019	"All Time High"	—	—	—	This Is Not the End
2021	"Save You" (featuring Redlight King)	—	—	—	I Run with Wolves
2021	"Stronger" (featuring Unsecret)	—	—	—	Non-album single
2021	"Light It Up" (featuring Unsecret)	—	—	—	I Run with Wolves
2021	"Blackout" (featuring Sam Tinnesz)	—	—	—	I Run with Wolves
2021	"I Run with Wolves"	—	—	—	I Run with Wolves
2021	"Forever"	—	—	—	I Run with Wolves
2022	"Ups and Downs"	—	—	—	I Run with Wolves
2022	"Gravity Falls" (featuring Trevor McNevan)	—	—	—	I Run with Wolves
2022	"Nemesis" (featuring Sonny Sandoval)	—	—	—	I Run with Wolves
2022	"Brain Dead"	—	—	—	I Run with Wolves
2022	"Teardrops" (featuring Greylee and Unsecret)	—	—	—	Numb
2022	"Here We Come" (featuring Otto Blue)	—	—	—	Numb
2022	"Return of the Greatest" (featuring Otto Blue)	—	—	—	Numb
2022	"Born To Be a Legend" (featuring Otto Blue and Liv Ash)	—	—	—	Numb
2022	"Crawling" (Linkin Park cover)	—	—	—	Numb
2023	"In the End" (Linkin Park cover)	—	—	—	Numb
2023	"Numb" (featuring Greylee and Unsecret) (Linkin Park cover)	—	—	—	Numb
2023	"God's Gonna Cut You Down" (Johnny Cash cover)	—	—	—	Numb
2023	"Seven Nation Army" (The White Stripes cover)	—	—	—	Numb
2023	"Time To Go To War" (feat. Unsecret)	—	—	—	Learning How To Be Human
2023	"Start Again"	—	—	—	Learning How To Be Human
2023	"Help"	—	—	—	Learning How To Be Human
2023	"Cleanin' Out My Closet"	—	—	—	Learning How To Be Human
2023	"Back of a Church"	—	—	—	Learning How To Be Human
2023	"Unstoppable"	—	—	—	Learning How To Be Human
2024	"No Stranger To the Pain"	—	—	—	Learning How To Be Human
2024	"Never Back Down" (with Caleb Hyles)	—	—	—	Non-album singles
2024	"Learning How To Be Human"	—	—	—	Learning How To Be Human
2024	"Here I Am"	—	—	—	Learning How To Be Human
2024	"Heavy Metal"	—	—	—	Learning How To Be Human
2024	"Soldier" (featuring Greylee)	—	—	—	Learning How To Be Human
2024	"Down to Business"	—	—	—	Silent Beast
2024	"Pushing My Way To the Top"	—	—	—	Silent Beast
2024	"Notorious" (feat. Brandon Ray and The Hell Above)	—	—	—	Silent Beast
2024	"Stressed Out" (feat. The Hell Above) (Twenty One Pilots cover)	—	—	—	Non-album single

- "Do It Afraid" (2020)

=== Music videos ===
Title	Album	Link
"Rodeo"	Epiphany	YouTube Go
"What I Got to Say"	Epiphany	YouTube Go
"Impossible"	Glory	YouTube Go
"Runaway"	Glory	YouTube Go
"Bounce"	Glory	YouTube Go
"So Beautiful"	Citizens Activ	YouTube Go
"4-3-2-1"	Citizens Activ	YouTube Go
"Avalanche"	The Chase	YouTube Go
"No Plan B" (featuring Kenta Jones of Crossfaith)	The Chase	YouTube Go
"Bring the Ruckus"	The Chase	YouTube Go
"Renegade"	The Chase	YouTube Go
"Fire in the Kitchen"	The Chase	YouTube Go
"Every Time You Run"	The Chase	YouTube Go
"Fighter"	Fighter	YouTube Go
"Fighter 2.0"	Fighter	YouTube Go
"Kimi-Wa Fighter"	Fighter	YouTube Go
"Throw It Away"	Fighter	YouTube Go
"Human"	Fighter	YouTube Go
"Pushover"	Fighter	YouTube Go
"Never Let You Go"	Fighter	YouTube Go
"Overboard"	Stories Since Seventy Nine	YouTube Go
"California Christmas"	Christmas All Year	YouTube Go
"Edge of My Life"	The Moment	YouTube Go
"Diamonds"	The Moment	YouTube Go
"My Way"	The Moment	YouTube Go
"Let You Drive"	Reborn	YouTube Go
"Reborn"	Reborn	YouTube Go
"Army"	Reborn	YouTube Go
"Pray"	Reborn	YouTube Go
"Pray" (featuring Yosh Morita of Survive Said the Prophet)	Reborn	YouTube Go
"Fearless"	Reborn	YouTube Go
"Come Back Home" (featuring Trevor McNevan)	This Is Not the End	YouTube Go
"Plan For Me" (featuring Melanie Greenwood)	This Is Not the End	YouTube Go
"All Time High"	This Is Not the End	YouTube Go
"Blackout" (featuring Sam Tinnesz)	I Run with Wolves	YouTube Go
"I Run with Wolves"	I Run with Wolves	YouTube Go
"Teardrops"	Numb	YouTube Go
"Born To Be a Legend" (featuring Otto Blue and Liv Ash)	Numb	YouTube Go
"Help"	Learning How To Be Human	
"Start Again"	Learning How To Be Human	
"Cleanin' Out My Closet"	Learning How To Be Human	
"Back of a Church"	Learning How To Be Human	
"Seven Nation Army"	Numb	
"Unstoppable"	Learning How To Be Human	
"No Stranger To the Pain"	Learning How To Be Human	
"Learning How To Be Human"	Learning How To Be Human	
"God's Gonna Cut You Down"	Numb	
"Glitch In the Matrix"	Learning How To Be Human	
"Here I Am"	Learning How To Be Human	
"Stressed Out"

=== Lyric videos ===
Title	Album	Link
"Skills"	Epiphany	YouTube Go
"Where Are You"	Glory	YouTube Go
"Fighter"	Fighter	YouTube Go
"Human"	Fighter	YouTube Go
"Never Let You Go"	Fighter	YouTube Go
"Overboard"	Stories Since Seventy Nine	YouTube Go
"Edge of My Life"	The Moment	YouTube Go
"Diamonds"	The Moment	YouTube Go
"Cage"	The Moment	YouTube Go
"Love Wide Open"	The Moment	YouTube Go
"Light"	The Moment	YouTube Go
"Bull in a China Shop"	The Moment	YouTube Go
"Let You Drive"	Reborn	YouTube Go
"Reborn"	Reborn	YouTube Go
"Shine On"	Reborn	YouTube Go
"Stones"	Stones	YouTube Go
"House of Cards"	Stones	YouTube Go
"Firestarter" (Remix)	Stones	YouTube Go
"When the Truth Comes Out"	Stones	YouTube Go
"Come Back Home"	This Is Not the End	
"Plan for Me"	This Is Not the End	
"Save You"	I Run with Wolves	
"Stronger"	Non-album single	
"Light It Up"	I Run with Wolves	
"Forever"	I Run with Wolves	
"Ups and Downs"	I Run with Wolves	
"Gravity Falls"	I Run with Wolves	
"Nemesis"	I Run with Wolves	
"Brain Dead"	I Run with Wolves	
"In the End"	Non-album singles	
"Numb"	Non-album singles	
"God's Gonna Cut You Down"	Non-album singles	
