= Reborn (Manafest album) =

Studio album by Manafest
- Released: October 2, 2015
- Genre: Christian hip hop, rap rock, pop rap
- Length: 41:22
- Label: Manafest Productions
- Producer: Joel Bruyere, Seth Mosley, Michael O'Conner

Manafest chronology
The Moment (2014)	Reborn (2015)	Stones (2017)

Reborn is the eighth studio album by the Christian rapper Manafest. It was independently released on October 2, 2015. The album was distributed by The Fuel Music. The release was fan-funded through a PledgeMusic campaign and is Manafest's first fully independent album in over a decade.

According to Manafest, the album is titled Reborn because it speaks to the "rebirthing" of his personal status of becoming an independent artist again, as well as the fact he decided to use the album to retrace his hip-hop origins and roots.

== Background ==
In the later half of 2014, Manafest released the single "Let Go", featuring Dave Stovall. The song was later pulled from iTunes, but remained in Manafest's store.

On April 19, 2015, Manafest announced a new PledgeMusic campaign for his next full-length, fully independent album, Reborn. He stated the album was to be more hip hop-inspired in its sound and return to his roots of straighter hip hop. The record is to be released in October, 2015 with 5% of the money raised by the project going to the Epilepsy Foundation to support awareness for the condition.

On June 16, Manafest announced that Soul Glow Activatur, former lead singer of Family Force 5, would be featured on the new album for the track "Stick to Your Gunz". On June 27, Manafest revealed that Tedashii would be featured on the track "I Have a Dream", a reference to the 1963 speech by Martin Luther King Jr., who is also sampled on the track. On July 2, Manafest announced that Shonlock would also be featured in collaboration on the song "I Have a Dream". Trevor McNevan was then announced to be expected to be featured on the track "Shine On".

On July 29, Manafest announced to pledgers the release date of the album to October 2, 2015. This was followed by a general announcement to the public on August 6, via YouTube.

On August 4, Manafest announced that the first music would be released to people who pre-ordered the album. On July 12, Manafest released a brief preview of the song "Army" on YouTube which showcased the total line-up of all the featured artists that will be on Reborn. On July 17, the album project reached 100% funded. On July 31, Manafest gave pledgers previews to two songs off the album: "Reborn" and "Let You Drive." As promised, Manafest released both full songs free, as singles, to the pledgers on August 4, 2015. The lyric videos for both "Let You Drive" and "Reborn" were released the next day on August 5. On August 7, "Let You Drive" was released globally on iTunes. On August 17, Manafest informed pledgers he would be sending out their pre-ordered albums in early September. On July 19, Manafest released the official track listing for the album to pledgers. On August 28, Manafest released the music video for "Let You Drive", a day after releasing it to pledgers.

On September 3, 2015, a pre-order option for Reborn was put on iTunes. On September 9, 2015, Manafest released the album early in digital download format to all album pledgers. On September 9, according to Manafest, shipping had begun for all album packages to pledgers.

Manafest released the official music video for the song "Pray" on September 22, 2015, via YouTube.

When addressing the genre of the album, Manafest stated: "I've always rapped, even on the rock stuff, but I've wanted to do a more hip-hop influenced record for a long time. I started thinking about that just after Fighter came out, which was my second kind of more real rock record like The Chase, and then last year's The Moment was a bit of a hybrid record. For Reborn, I decided to go back to hip-hop, but even the way I do hip-hop isn't the traditional 'boom, bap,' stuff, so I don't think the fans who like more of the rock stuff will be disappointed."

== Critical reception ==
Professional ratings
Review scores
Source	Rating
CCM Magazine	4/5 stars
The Christian Beat	4/5 stars
Jesus Freak Hideout	3/5 stars
Louder Than the Music	5/5 stars
New Release Today	2.5/5 stars

The album garnered generally positive to average reviews from multiple professional music sites and critics.

Awarding the album three stars from Jesus Freak Hideout, Kevin Hoskins states, "Reborn is positively focused in its message and most of the beats are decent". Mark Ryan, giving the album two and a half stars at New Release Today, writes, "Reborn is the renewal of an artist who has taken his new found creative freedom and produced an album that fans new and old will appreciate." Rating the album four stars for The Christian Beat, Chris Major says, "Reborn takes a different stylistic direction with familiar echoes of past works, making for a satisfying album." Carolyn Aldis, indicating in a five star review by Louder Than the Music, recognizes, "Reborn reminds us of all the great things about a new life, without glossing over the tough stuff."

=== Awards ===
The album received a nomination in the category of "Contemporary Christian/Gospel Album of the Year" for the Juno Awards of 2017.

== Singles ==
On August 4, 2015, Manafest simultaneously released the first two singles off the album: "Let You Drive" and "Reborn" to pledgers. This was followed by the re-releasing of "Let Go" on August 19. Finally, "Shine On", featuring Trevor McNevan, was released to pledgers on August 24.

On August 7, "Let You Drive" and "Reborn" received simultaneous official releases as singles on iTunes.

In September 2015, "Let You Drive" reached No. 1 on the CMW Rhythmic chart.

== Track listing ==
All tracks are written by Chris Greenwood and Joel Bruyere, except where noted

Album release
No.	Title	Writer(s)	Length
1.	"Reborn" (featuring The Drawing Room)		3:08
2.	"Let You Drive"	Greenwood, Seth Mosley	3:29
3.	"Fearless" (featuring Alicia Simila of Newport Worship)		3:30
4.	"Army"		3:20
5.	"Shine On (Shine)" (featuring Trevor McNevan of Thousand Foot Krutch)	Greenwood, Bruyere, Trevor McNevan	3:39
6.	"Pray"	Greenwood, Mosley	3:48
7.	"Stay Close"		3:48
8.	"Stick to Your Gunz" (featuring Soul Glow Activatur)	Greenwood, Bruyere, Solomon Olds	4:12
9.	"Last Train" (featuring DJ Versatile)		3:18
10.	"I Have a Dream" (featuring Shonlock and Tedashii)	Greenwood, Chris Stacey	3:26
11.	"Jack & Jill"		2:37
12.	"Let Go" (featuring Dave Stovall)	Greenwood, Jasen Rauch, Dave Stovall	3:07
Total length:			41:22

PledgeMusic bonus tracks
No.	Title	Writer(s)	Length
13.	"Pray" (featuring Yosh Morita of Survive Said the Prophet)	Greenwood, Mosley	3:52
14.	"I Won't Give Up" (Demo)	Greenwood, Joel Piper	3:51
15.	"Transform" (featuring Relic the Oddity)	Greenwood, Mark Morley	3:09

2018 iTunes single
No.	Title	Writer(s)	Length
1.	"Pray" (The Symphony Mix)	Greenwood, Mosley	3:30

== Personnel ==
-Numbers in parentheses symbolize track numbers

- Manafest - lead vocals, executive producer
- Joel Bruyere (The Drawing Room) - producer, mixing, engineering: all tracks (except 2 and 6), additional vocals on track 1
- Alicia Simila - additional vocals on track 3
- Trevor McNevan - additional vocals on track 5
- Soul Glow Activatur (Solomon Olds, formerly of Family Force 5) - additional vocals on track 8
- Shonlock - additional vocals on track 10
- Tedashii - additional vocals on track 10
- Dave Stovall (of Wavorly, bassist of Audio Adrenaline) - additional vocals on track 12
- Yosh Morita (of Survive Said the Prophet) - additional vocals on bonus track 13
- Relic the Oddity (Mark Morley) - additional vocals on bonus track 15
- DJ Versatile - scratching on track 9, cuts on track 11

Additional musicians and production

- Kelly Hoppe (of Big Sugar) - harmonica on track 1
- Seth Mosley - co-producer, background vocals, keys/programming: track 2 and 6, bass (on track 6 only)
- Michael X O'Connor - co-producer, engineering, sound editing: track 2 and 6
- Jerricho Scroggins - backing vocals on track 2, sound editing (2, 6), production assistant (2, 6)
- Jerry McPherson - guitars on track 2 and 6
- Miles McPherson (former live drummer of Paramore) - drums on track 2 and 6
- Tony Lucido - bass (on track 2 only)
- David Davidson - violin, strings arrangement: track 6
- David Angell - violin on track 6
- Monisa Angell - viola on track 6
- Carole Rabinowitz - cello on track 6
- Sean Moffitt - mixing on track 2 and 6
- Austin Atwood - engineering on track 2 and 6
- Bobby Shin - engineering on track 2
- Michael Sanders - sound editing on track 2 and 6
- Graham Brozyck - vocal recording/engineering for Alicia Simila (on track 3)
- Scott Wandrey - vocal recording/engineering for Alicia Simila (on track 3)
- Phil Demetro - mastering
- Ryan Clark - art direction/design
- Melanie Greenwood - photography

== Chart performance ==
Chart (2015)	Peak position
US Christian Albums (Billboard)	34
US Heatseekers Albums (Billboard)	20

== Notes ==
- "Let Go" featuring Dave Stovall was originally a song that didn't make the final cut of Manafest's previous album The Moment, but was later released as a late 2014 single which preceded Reborn.
- The song, "I Have a Dream", is based in part on the famous speech of the same name, given by Martin Luther King Jr. in 1963. The track contains the recorded excerpt of King uttering the famous phrase.
- On multiple occasions leading up to the album's release, Manafest referred to the song Trevor McNevan was to be featured on as "Shine" and it is also attributed as this in the album credits. However, according to the official track listing and the back of the physical album casing, the track is called "Shine On".
- The lyrics for the song "Fearless" were written just before Chris Greenwood's daughter London was born in March, 2014. The track speaks to his thoughts on being a father, but never really having a father himself.
- The last line in the song "Jack & Jill" was originally from the opening verse of Manafest's previous track "Live On" off his 2008's album Citizens Activ.
- Though originally intended to do some writing on the album, this album marks the first Manafest release to not feature any contribution by Manafest's long-time producer and friend Adam Messinger.
- According to Manafest, the bonus track "I Won't Give Up" may see release to the general public as a single.
- The bonus track "Transform" is an archived track from the earlier years in Manafest's career. The song features Manafest's longtime friend and record producer Mark Morley (also known under the moniker Relic the Oddity and Relic McCoy). In 2018, Manafest re-released the song exclusively to his Patreon supporters, with the slight retitle of "Transformed".
- In February 2018, Manafest released an archived radio edit version of the song "Pray" which he had intended to send to radio stations for airplay back when Reborn originally debuted. The single was dubbed "The Symphony Mix" and featured previously unheard verses to the song.
