= The Moment (Manafest album) =

Studio album by Manafest
- Released: August 5, 2014
- Genre: Christian hip hop, rap rock, alternative rock
- Length: 38:40
- Label: BEC
- Producer: Joel Bruyere, Adam Messinger

Manafest chronology
Stories Since Seventy Nine (2012)	The Moment (2014)	Reborn (2015)

Professional ratings
Review scores
Source	Rating
CCM Magazine	4/5 stars
Christian Music Review	4.7/5
Christian Review Magazine	5/5 stars
HM Magazine	4/5 stars
Indie Vision Music	3/5 stars
Jesus Freak Hideout	3/5 stars
Louder Than the Music	4/5 stars
New Release Tuesday	4/5 stars

The Moment is the seventh studio album by the Christian rapper Manafest. It was released on August 5, 2014 under BEC Recordings. The album was fan-funded through a PledgeMusic campaign.

The album marks Manafest's final release with his long-time affiliate label BEC Recordings before moving to a fully independent status for his next album Reborn.

== Critical reception ==
The album received generally positive reviews from multiple professional music sites and reviews.

Christian St. John of Christian Review Magazine showered compliments on the album saying: "Manafest has found himself on The Moment. I can’t quite put my finger on it, but it seems to me that this album is Manafest’s defining work, his coming-of-age album if you will." Speaking for CCM Magazine, Andy Argyrakis praised the release by stating: "Manafest continues to strike rap/rock gold with a dozen new tunes... the Canadian veteran spreads faith-affirming positivity over some of his sharpest rhymes to date." Sarah Brehm from HM Magazine went on to say that The Moment "is filled with infectious rap-rock anthems infused with layers of trendy-pop beats... Manafast has delivered a solid, well-crafted album that’s sure to be a hit." In definite agreement, Mary Nikkel of New Release Tuesday added: "The Moment pulses with immediacy, utilizing snappy rhymes and grungy guitars to demolish fear and call for faith. This is a stand-out moment in his discography, and a solid addition to any rock or urban library."

On the flip side, Michael Weaver of Jesus Freak Hideout moderately stated: "Manafest has made a clear decision to head in a different direction with The Moment. Musically, the edge is gone... Hopefully when we see him next, Manafest will be living up to his full potential. In the meantime, maybe you should go back and revisit The Chase instead." Lee Brown of Indie Vision Music writes: "Fans of Manafest will find an engaging album that continues his propensity towards engaging and uplifting lyrics sure to inspire on the one hand and provide great work-out music on the other."

Retrospectively in a 2015 interview, Manafest himself hinted at some dissatisfaction with the album's production when he stated, "The Chase was an all-rock record and I did Fighter and it was just an all-rock record, and those were both received really really well. But, before that, my records were mixed. I feel like I did that again with The Moment and I’m not sure that that always works the best. For me, in creating it, I feel like I’m split because I’m like, “what is this?”"

=== Awards ===
The album received a nomination in the category of "Contemporary Christian/Gospel Album of the Year" for the Juno Awards of 2015.

== Singles ==
The album includes the singles of "Diamonds" and "Edge of My Life". "Diamonds" peaked within the top 5 on the ChristianRock.Net radio charts.

== Track listing ==
Album release
No.	Title	Writer(s)	Length
1.	"The Moment"	Chris Greenwood, Joel Bruyere, Adam Messinger	3:25
2.	"Edge of My Life"	Greenwood, Messinger	3:33
3.	"Criminal"	Greenwood, Bruyere	3:27
4.	"Cage"	Greenwood, Bruyere	3:21
5.	"Love Wide Open"	Greenwood, Bruyere	3:55
6.	"Light"	Greenwood, Joshua O'Haire	1:20
7.	"Diamonds" (featuring Trevor McNevan of Thousand Foot Krutch)	Greenwood, Bruyere, Trevor McNevan	3:59
8.	"Paradise"	Greenwood, Bruyere, Josh Macintosh, McNevan	3:20
9.	"Bull in a China Shop"	Greenwood, McNevan	2:54
10.	"Startup Kid"	Greenwood, Bruyere	3:03
11.	"My Way"	Greenwood, Bruyere, Messinger	2:57
12.	"Thrill of It All"	Greenwood, Bruyere	3:26
Total length:			38:40

Japanese edition bonus track
No.	Title	Length
13.	"Cage" (featuring AG of Noisemaker)	3:21

== Personnel ==
- Manafest - lead vocals, executive producer
- Trevor McNevan - additional vocals on track 7
- AG (of Noisemaker) - additional vocals on track 13
- Joel Bruyere - producer on all tracks (except track 2 & 6), mixing on all tracks (except track 2)
- Adam Messinger - producer on track 2, mixing on track 2
- Joshua O'Haire - producer on track 6
- Ryan Clark - art direction, art design
- Juliana Johnson - photography

== Charts ==
Album

Chart (2014–2015)	Peak position
US Christian Albums (Billboard)	14
US Top Hard Rock Albums (Billboard)	25
US Heatseekers Albums (Billboard)	11
US Independent Albums (Billboard)	40

Songs

Song	Chart (2014–2015)	Peak position
"Edge of My Life"	US Hot Christian Songs (Billboard)	48
"Edge of My Life"	US Christian Airplay (Billboard)	32
"Diamonds"	US Hot Christian Songs (Billboard)	48
"Diamonds"	US Christian Airplay (Billboard)	34

== Music videos ==
- Edge of My Life on YouTube
- Diamonds on YouTube
- My Way on YouTube

Lyric videos

- Edge of My Life on YouTube
- Cage on YouTube
- Love Wide Open on YouTube
- Light on YouTube
- Diamonds on YouTube
- Bull in a China Shop on YouTube

== Notes ==
- In 2014, as with many of Manafest's releases, The Moment was given an album instrumentals release.
- The track "Bull in a China Shop" was originally supposed to be a Thousand Foot Krutch song before Trevor McNevan pitched it to Manafest for the release of The Moment.
- The track "Love Wide Open" was originally going to be entitled "East Coast Winter". The song's name was changed as Manafest decided the general population did not fully understand what an "east coast winter" was like and therefore, was not relatable enough overall.
- Nirva Ready (of TobyMac's Diverse City) was originally intended to be featured on the track "Diamonds" but it didn't work out and fit the song according to Manafest.
- The song "Light" was originally intended to be used as an audio promotional for Manafest's 2013 book Fighter: Five Keys to Conquering Your Fear and Reaching Your Dreams. It was however never utilized and Manafest decided instead to release it on The Moment.
- The song "Startup Kid" echos back to Manafest's earlier days of straighter hip hop and was made based on the request of his fans.
- "Let Go" featuring Dave Stovall of Wavorly was a song that didn't make the final cut of The Moment but was later released as a 2015 single. The song was recently pulled from iTunes (it is however still available in Manafest's store). Manafest has also hinted it might make his next album's track listing.
