= Live in Concert (Manafest album) =

Live album by Manafest
- Released: June 7, 2011
- Genre: Christian hip hop, rap rock, hard rock
- Length: 41:16
- Label: BEC
- Producer: Manafest, Adam Messinger

Manafest chronology
The Chase (2010)	Live in Concert (2011)	Fighter (2012)

Professional ratings
Review scores
Source	Rating
AllMusic	3.5/5 stars
Jesus Freak Hideout	3/5 stars
The Christian Rock 20	4/5 stars

Live in Concert (also known as Manafest: Live in Concert) is a live album from the Christian rapper Manafest. It was released on June 7, 2011 under BEC Recordings.

The release was recorded at a show in Canada, during the Superchick Reinvention Tour in Fall, 2010.

== Critical reception ==
The album received generally positive reception from professional music sites and reviews.

Rick Anderson of AllMusic complimented the live release stating: "Chris Greenwood (a.k.a. Manafest) is generally billed as a Christian rapper, but on the evidence provided by his first live album, he's as much singer as rapper, and his style owes as much to metal as to hip-hop. The 12-song set finds him jumping back and forth between metallic-flavored hip-hop and rap-flavored metal songs, delving (not very successfully) into swinging 12/8 funk rhythms and (more successfully) power ballads. There are good hooks scattered throughout the album, and his band sounds fantastic: the musical texture offers a consistently satisfying balance of crunchy and chewy." Kevin Hoskins of Jesus Freak Hideout went on to state "Mana has a slew of albums basically compiled of pretty solid rap tunes, so it's no surprise that the song selection here is full of good tracks. All listeners will enjoy the constant energy from the crowd amid a collection of great songs like 'Avalanche', 'Bounce', 'Impossible', and 'The Chase'." Paul Gibson of The Christian Rock 20 applauded the album saying "Manafest's Live In Concert is fun to listen to or watch on your TV at home, featuring mostly songs from The Chase it also features more classic tunes like '4-3-2-1', 'Bounce', and 'Impossible'. With the full band he even adds more rock flair to songs that started off as hip-hop."

The album did receive a few negative notes and critiques. Hoskins of Jesus Freak Hideout plainly said that "Long time fans of Manafest, however, will notice that the bulk of this album is from last year's release (The Chase) and there's only a small selection from Citizens Activ and Glory, a move that leaves out some great song choices. The bigger crime here, though, is that there is not a single song from Epiphany. I was definitely expecting "Rodeo" or "Skills" to be included in this compilation album, but they were both regretfully omitted. Also, I think that the overall recording could have gone without "Top of the World" and "Renegade" as there are much better options that could have used in their stead." Conquering with a similar complaint regarding the absence of any tracks from Epiphany, Gibson of The Christian Rock 20 noted "I do wish that "Skills" had been part of the set list, but hey, nothing is completely perfect."

=== Accolades ===
The album won "Rap/Hip Hop Album of the Year" at the 33rd GMA Canada Covenant Awards.

== Additional DVD ==
Besides the audio CD, the release also comes with a secondary DVD which contains the entire filmed live performance. It also contains a Japan interview with Manafest, as well as three music videos ("Impossible", "Avalanche", and "No Plan B").

The entire filmed performance featured on the album can also be found on Manafest's YouTube channel.

== Track listing ==
No.	Title	Writer(s)	Original studio recording on	Length
1.	"Avalanche"	Chris Greenwood, Adam Messinger	The Chase	4:18
2.	"4-3-2-1"	Greenwood, Messinger	Citizens Activ	2:57
3.	"Top of the World"	Greenwood, Messinger	Citizens Activ	3:37
4.	"No Plan B"	Greenwood, Messinger	The Chase	3:52
5.	"Bounce"	Greenwood, Messinger	Glory	3:31
6.	"Impossible"	Greenwood, Messinger, Trevor McNevan	Glory	4:31
7.	"Bring the Ruckus"	Josh Macintosh, Greenwood, Messinger	The Chase	3:43
8.	"Fear" (interlude)		-	2:05
9.	"Every Time You Run"	McNevan, Greenwood, Messinger	The Chase	3:36
10.	"Renegade"	Greenwood, Messinger, McNevan	The Chase	3:39
11.	"Fire in the Kitchen"	Greenwood, Messinger	The Chase	3:01
12.	"The Chase"	Greenwood, Messinger	The Chase	2:26
Total length:				41:16

== Personnel ==
Band

- Manafest – lead vocals, executive producer
- Josh Macintosh – guitar
- Mike Crofts – bass
- Travis Blackmore – drums

Additional production

- Trevor McNevan – prerecorded studio vocals on track 6, 9, 10, 11
- Adam Messinger – producer
- Marcel Preston – live audio recording
- Ian Hough – light engineering
- Jeremy Rollefson – live mixing
- Chris Stacey – filming
- Marlon Paul – filming
- Dave McSporran – video editing, DVD authoring
- Melanie Greenwood – graphic design, photography

== Chart performance ==
Chart (2011)	Peak position
Billboard Hot Christian Songs: "Avalanche" (Live)	41
Billboard Hot Christian Songs: "No Plan B" (Live)	49
Billboard Hot Christian Songs: "Every Time You Run" (Live)	31

- AllMusic records "Every Time You Run" hitting at No. 34 in 2011 and then proceeding to peak at No. 31 in 2012.

== Notes ==
- The album's cover is heavily inspired by the art themes of The Chase. The star symbol is the album's prevalent trademark, and the gas-mask is featured in Manafest's music video for the song "Fire in the Kitchen" (which is a track off The Chase).
