= Stones (Manafest album) =

Studio album by Manafest
- Released: July 21, 2017
- Genres: Rap rock, alternative rock, hard rock
- Length: 39:02
- Label: Manafest Productions
- Producers: Seth Mosley, Michael X O'Conner, Adam Messinger, Wally Gagel, Xandy Barry, Lenny Skolnik, Joel Piper

Manafest chronology
Reborn (2015)	Stones (2017)	Stones Reloaded (2018)

Stones is the ninth studio album by Canadian Christian rapper Manafest. It was independently released on July 21, 2017. The release was fan-funded through a Kickstarter campaign and is Manafest's second fully independent album since his departure from BEC Recordings.

== Background ==
On October 5, 2015, Manafest released three bonus tracks via PledgeMusic to those who supported his 2015 album Reborn. The second track given to fans was a demo song entitled "I Won't Give Up". It was retitled "Won't Give Up" and musically altered before being debuted as a single on April 29, 2016. This track eventually went on to be the closing track for the album Stones.

On February 20, 2017, Manafest launched a Kickstarter project for a new album entitled Stones. On the same day, Manafest also released the title track to fans (via email and Dropbox) who had supported his previous fan-funded projects.

On March 21, 2017, Manafest debuted the second single from the album entitled "House of Cards" to pledgers. On May 9, the song was released to project backers for early download.

On May 26, 2017, Manafest announced that pledgers would be getting two unreleased bonus tracks, as well as the instrumentals for the album.

Around the second week of June, 2017, pledgers began receiving their copies of the album, a little less than a month ahead of the release date.

== Critical reception ==
Professional ratings
Review scores
Source	Rating
CCM Magazine	3.5/5 stars
The Christian Beat	4.6/5 stars
Jesus Freak Hideout	3/5 stars 3.5/5 stars
New Release Today	4/5 stars
Shockwave Magazine	(Favorable)

The album received generally positive to average reviews from multiple professional music sites and reviews.

Amanda DeWilde of New Release Today stated, "After nearly twenty years of writing music, Manafest has certainly reached the point in his career of knowing what his fans like and exuding confidence in his unique style. Stones is all about unapologetically pursuing your God-given talents and passions despite the voices telling you to stop, whether they be from the devil, the overly critical, or from inside your own head." Matt Conner of CCM Magazine went on to say, "Five years have passed since Manafest last delivered an all-out rock assault, which makes Stones a special surprise for fans of albums like The Chase or Fighter. The heavy instrumentation matches the found themes, giving the album a darker, more authentic mood than other releases....Modern rock fans will enjoy the majority of Stones while longtime fans will appreciate throwback tunes like the Caribbean feel and flow of 'Coming Back'." Ryan Dekkinga of Shockwave Magazine praised the album saying, "This is an album I can rock out to with my kids in the car, fists in the air, all without a care in the world. These are all admirable traits and quite frankly, make for a refreshing take on what rock and roll can be. It can ask more of you. It can inspire. It can have a great time doing it too." Finally, Chris Major of The Christian Beat concluded, "It's clear that Manafest has stepped up to the challenge again, having created something that is guaranteed to become a fan favorite. In fact, Stones has everything fans have come to love - and more. The album is the artist's signature sound, with the energetic fight anthems and moments of resolve that make his previous works so well beloved. For all fans of Manafest's music, stop now and listen to Stones - it's the album you've been waiting for."

On the flip side, Kevin Hoskins of Jesus Freak Hideout moderately stated, "As with most albums, not all is perfect on this release as some tracks could be labeled as just fair....I personally wish he would stick to his sweet spot of rap/rock, but he definitely has an appeal to a much broader scope of fans. Fans should definitely check this out even though it may not be Mana's best work to date." David Craft of Jesus Freak Hideout concluded, "Ultimately, the album's greatest shortcomings are found in its lack of lyrical depth. None of the songs are of poor quality, and some are indeed quite enjoyable. If anything, Stones feels like a just above-average missed opportunity. Manafest is extremely talented and his skill bleeds through quite often this time around, but while the album is a success, we can hope for more home runs next time."

=== Awards ===
The album received a nomination in the category of "Contemporary Christian/Gospel Album of the Year" for the Juno Awards of 2018.

== Singles ==
On February 23, 2017, Manafest released the title track "Stones" as the first single off the release via lyric video. On March 21, 2017, Manafest debuted a second single entitled "House of Cards" to pledgers exclusively. It was later released to the public in the form of a lyric video.

== Track listing ==
Album release
No.	Title	Writer(s)	Producer(s)	Length
1.	"Stones"	Chris Greenwood, Adam Messinger	Adam Messinger	3:12
2.	"House of Cards"	Greenwood, Seth Mosley	Seth Mosley, Michael X O'Connor	2:40
3.	"Firestarter"	Greenwood, Trevor McNevan, Mosley, Joe Rickard	Mosley, O'Connor	3:31
4.	"When the Truth Comes Out"	Greenwood, Lenny Skolnik, Seann Bowe	Lenny Skolnik	3:43
5.	"Find a Way to Fight"	Greenwood, Mark Kasprzyk, Wally Gagel, Xandy Barry	Wally Gagel, Xandy Barry	3:23
6.	"You're Gonna Rise"	Greenwood, Mosley, Justin Cordle	Mosley, O'Connor	4:44
7.	"Blow You Away"	Greenwood, Mosley, Rickard	Mosley, O'Connor	3:00
8.	"Coming Back"	Greenwood, Skolnik, Bowe, Rickard	Skolnik	3:39
9.	"Merry Go Round"	Greenwood, Mosley, Rickard	Mosley, O'Connor	3:49
10.	"Amplifier" (featuring Alicia Simila of Newport Worship)	Greenwood, Mosley, John Cooper	Mosley, O'Connor	3:35
11.	"Won't Give Up"	Greenwood, Joel Piper	Joel Piper	3:46
Total length:				39:02

== Personnel ==
- Manafest – lead vocals, executive producer
- Alicia Simila – additional vocals on track 10
- Adam Messinger – producer, mixing/instrumentation (track 1)
- Seth Mosley – producer, background vocals, keys/programming (tracks 2 and 6), bass (track 6)
- Michael X O'Connor – producer, engineering (tracks 1, 2, 6, 7, 9, 10), sound editing (tracks 2 and 6)
- Xandy Barry – producer
- Joel Piper – production, mixing (track 11)
- Jerricho Scroggins – engineering (tracks 2, 3, 4, 6, 7, 8, 9)

== Chart performance ==
Chart (2017)	Peak position
US Mainstream Rock: "Stones" (Billboard)	39
US Mainstream Rock: "House of Cards" (Billboard)	37

== Music videos ==
- "Stones" on YouTube

Lyric videos

- "House of Cards" on YouTube
- "When the Truth Comes Out" on YouTube
- "Firestarter" (remix) on YouTube

== Stones Reloaded ==
On July 27, 2017, Manafest announced via his Patreon that he was working on a release entitled "The Remix Project" in which he was planning to remix all the songs from Stones. On September 28, 2017, Manafest announced the project was officially titled Stones Reloaded and he began to release songs each month to supporters before releasing the full album on September 21, 2018.

== Notes ==
- On August 31, 2017, as with most of his other releases, Manafest released the instrumentals for Stones.
