= Stories Since Seventy Nine =

EP by Manafest
- Released: September 5, 2012
- Genre: Christian rock, rap rock, alternative rock
- Length: 19:37
- Label: Manafest Productions, Inc.
- Producer: Seth Mosley

Manafest chronology
Fighter (2012)	Stories Since Seventy Nine (2012)	The Moment (2014)

Stories Since Seventy Nine (abbreviated Stories Since 79 or Ss79) is a Canadian-exclusive EP by the Christian rapper Manafest. It was released independently on September 5, 2012. The EP is technically a side project release and not a regular piece of Manafest's work.

In 2015, the EP was globally released via Manafest's official store for physical and digital purchase, and is no longer exclusive to Canada.

== Singles ==
In July 2013, the track "Overboard" became the first single to be released off the EP.

== Track listing ==
All tracks are written by Chris Greenwood and Seth Mosley, except where noted

No.	Title	Writer(s)	Length
1.	"Overboard"		3:05
2.	"Encore"	Greenwood, Josh Macintosh, Joel Piper	3:05
3.	"California"		3:48
4.	"New Trend"		3:15
5.	"Perfect World"		3:17
6.	"Overboard" (remix)		3:07
Total length:			19:37

== Personnel ==
- Manafest – lead vocals, executive producer
- Seth Mosley – producer (on all tracks except 2), background vocals on track 4
- Joel Piper – producer (on track 2 only)
- Melanie Greenwood – art direction/design

== Charts ==
Song	Chart (2013)	Peak position
"Overboard"	US Hot Christian Songs (Billboard)	38

== Music videos ==
- Overboard on YouTube

Lyric videos

- Overboard on YouTube

== Notes ==
- The EP is also known as Manafest Presents Stories Since Seventy Nine.
- The name of the release is a reference to Greenwood's birth year of 1979.
- Most of the songs on the EP were leftover softer pop tracks from Manafest's 2012 album Fighter.
- The track "California" speaks about Chris Greenwood's move from Toronto to Los Angeles in 2012.
- Though the EP itself was exclusive to Canada for a long length of time, the opening track, "Overboard", was released as a single globally on iTunes on July 9, 2013.
- Manafest himself stated the EP was not supposed to originally be exclusive to Canada, but due to legal issues regarding the record it was halted from a release in the United States.
- In 2018, Manafest released a second fuller remixed version of "Overboard" on his album Stones Reloaded, a remix project tied to his 2017 release Stones.
