= Stones Reloaded =

Remix album by Manafest
- Released: September 21, 2018
- Genre: Remix, electronic, rap rock
- Length: 47:13
- Label: Manafest Productions, Inc.
- Producer: Doug Weier

Manafest chronology
Stones (2017)	Stones Reloaded (2018)	This Is Not The End (2019)

Professional ratings
Review scores
Source	Rating
Jesus Freak Hideout	4.5/5 stars

Stones Reloaded (stylized at times as Stones [Re]Loaded or Stones: Reloaded) is a remix album by Canadian Christian rapper Manafest. It was independently released on September 21, 2018. The release was fan-funded through a PledgeMusic campaign.

The album contains a remixed version of every track on the 2017 album Stones.

== Background ==
On July 27, 2017, Manafest announced via his Patreon that he was working on a release entitled "The Remix Project" in which he was planning to remix all the songs from Stones.

On September 28, 2017, Manafest announced the project was officially titled Stones Reloaded. He released the first remix track "Stones" to Patreon pledgers in September, 2017 and proceeded to release a new remix song each month until all songs from the album were remixed. By August 2018, in monthly order, he had released the majority of songs to Patreaon supporters and instead opted to work towards a final public release planned for September 21, 2018 rather than release the remaining tracks monthly.

In mid-May, 2018, Manafest launched a PledgeMusic campaign to fund the release of the album. On July 13, 2018, the album reached its goal and was fully funded.

All the tracks on the release were remixed by Doug Weier (under the name Unicron), the guitarist of We Are Leo.

== Track listing ==
Album release
No.	Title	Writer(s)	Length
1.	"Genesis" (intro)	Chris Greenwood, Doug Weier	0:34
2.	"Blow You Away"	Greenwood, Trevor McNevan, Seth Mosley, Joe Rickard	3:30
3.	"You're Gonna Rise"	Greenwood, Mosley, Justin Cordle	3:44
4.	"Stones"	Greenwood, Adam Messinger	4:15
5.	"Merry Go Round"	Greenwood, Mosley, Rickard	3:52
6.	"Firestarter"	Greenwood, McNevan, Mosley, Rickard	4:05
7.	"Coming Back"	Greenwood, Lenny Skolnik, Seann Bowe, Rickard	3:34
8.	"House of Cards"	Greenwood, Mosley	3:17
9.	"When the Truth Comes Out"	Greenwood, Skolnik, Bowe	4:01
10.	"Find a Way to Fight"	Greenwood, Mark Kasprzyk, Wally Gagel, Xandy Barry	3:40
11.	"Won't Give Up"	Greenwood, Joel Piper	3:37
12.	"Amplifier"	Greenwood, Mosley, John Cooper	3:38
13.	"Overboard"	Greenwood, Mosley	4:04
14.	"Exodus" (outro)	Greenwood, Weier	1:22
Total length:			47:13

== Personnel ==
- Manafest - lead vocals
- Alicia Simila (of Newport Worship) – additional vocals on track 12
- Doug Weier (Unicron) - mixing, mastering
- Ryan Clark - art direction, photography

== Chart performance ==
Chart (2018)	Peak position
US Billboard Heatseekers albums"	21

== Music videos ==
- "Firestarter" (remix) on YouTube

== Notes ==
- The original track for the song "Overboard" comes from Manafest's 2012 side project release EP Stories Since Seventy Nine. The EP also contains another remix to "Overboard", but it is comparably less full in its restructuring from the original track.
