= This Is Not the End =

This Is Not the End may refer to:

== Music ==
- This Is Not the End (Baby Animals album), 2013
- This Is Not the End (Manafest album), 2019
- "This Is Not the End", a song by Mark Vincent that took part in the selection process for Australia in the Eurovision Song Contest 2019
- "This Is Not the End", a song recorded by Ronnie Radke on a demo for his early band True Story
