= Newport (worship team) =

American contemporary christian band

- Origin: Orange County, California
- Genres: Christian Contemporary-Worship
- Years active: 2006–present
- Labels: Essential
- Members: Graham Bronczyk; Jamin Steel; Alicia Simila
- Website: www.newportworship.com

Newport is a contemporary Christian and worship team from Orange County, California. The team was formed as a part of Newport Church by Jonathan and Dianne Wilson, former associate pastors of Hillsong Church in Australia, in 2006. The leadership team includes Graham Bronczyk, Alicia Simila and Jamin Steel and additional rotating members that assist in the songwriting. The team released their debut studio album under the Essential Records label on March 31, 2015 called Paradise.

In 2015, Alicia Simila was featured by the Christian rapper Manafest on his album Reborn for the song "Fearless". This was followed by a second feature on "Amplifier" for Manafest's 2017 release Stones.

== Discography ==
Paradise

- Released: March 31, 2015
- Label: Essential
- Format: CD, Digital download
