= My Own Thing =

Studio album by Manafest
- Released: December 2, 2003
- Recorded: 2003 in Philadelphia, Pennsylvania and Vancouver
- Genre: Christian hip hop
- Length: 58:36
- Label: Manafest Productions
- Producer: Manafest, That Brotha Lokey

Manafest chronology
| Misled Youth (2001) | My Own Thing (2003) | Epiphany (2005) |

Professional ratings
Review scores
| Source | Rating |
|---|---|
| Aphire | 3.75/5 stars |
| Cross Rhythms | 7/10 stars |
| Rapzilla | 3.75/5 stars |

My Own Thing is the debut studio album by the Christian rapper Manafest. It was independently released on December 2, 2003.

The release attracted the notice of Trevor McNevan of the Ontario-based rock band Thousand Foot Krutch and led shortly after to Manafest's signing with BEC Recordings under the Uprok Records label for his next album.

Later after its initial release, the 2005 track "Skills" (off Epiphany) was added as track 5 on the album.

== Critical reception ==
The release only garnered a few glances from professional music sites and reviews. They were however, generally positive.

Rapzilla praised the album saying "Manafest does an excellent job at sharing the message of Christ throughout My Own Thing, for peeps inside and outside of the four walls. This record is definitely worth adding to your collection. I wouldn’t doubt if you continue to hear strong efforts from Manafest in the future". Cross Rhythms positively noted "Manafest (aka Chris Greenwood), brings an unusual and varied offering from the northern climes of Canada.... Overall, a strong album with a gritty East Coast edge and heavy rock grooves". Finally, RationaL went on to state: "I get the feeling, after numerous listens, that My Own Thing had the makings of something special. Very little promotion or hype was put into this release, which is somewhat of a disappointment, when it is clear that Manafest is a talented artist with loads of potential. Nonetheless, the LP was a nice refreshment from the everyday hip-hop album, and, despite the lack of hype surrounding this release, you can expect big things from the Canadian kid in the very near future. My Own Thing is just a taste of things to come".

== Track listing ==
Album release
| No. | Title | Writer(s) | Producer(s) | Length |
|---|---|---|---|---|
| 1. | "Intro/What Up" | Chris Greenwood, Mark Morley | Relic the Oddity | 1:53 |
| 2. | "Down-Town" | Greenwood, Gerhard Thomas, Adam Messinger | That Brotha Lokey | 3:40 |
| 3. | "My Own Thing" | Greenwood, Chris Stacey | Chris Stacey | 3:31 |
| 4. | "What I Got to Say" | Greenwood, Thomas, Messinger | That Brotha Lokey | 3:58 |
| 5. | "Toronto" (interlude) | | Rob Berger, Chris Greenwood | 1:02 |
| 6. | "U Don't Know Me" | Greenwood, Stacy | Stacey | 4:00 |
| 7. | "Manafesto" | Greenwood, Morley | Relic the Oddity | 3:08 |
| 8. | "My Life" | Greenwood, Stacey | Stacey | 3:37 |
| 9. | "Feel It" | Greenwood, Thomas, Messinger | That Brotha Lokey | 3:30 |
| 10. | "Coffee Shop" (interlude) | | | 0:18 |
| 11. | "Slang Talkin'" | Greenwood, Thomas, Messinger | That Brotha Lokey | 2:57 |
| 12. | "Childs of Light" (featuring Jusachyl) | Greenwood, Thomas, C. Watt | That Brotha Lokey | 3:23 |
| 13. | "Mana Zone" (interlude) | | Adam Messinger, Berger, Greenwood | 0:26 |
| 14. | "The Ladies" (featuring Relic the Oddity) | Greenwood, Morley | Relic the Oddity | 4:33 |
| 15. | "The One" | Greenwood, Morley, Aubrey Norohna | Relic the Oddity | 3:52 |
| 16. | "Losing My Mind" (interlude) | | Berger, Greenwood | 0:43 |
| 17. | "Stressed Out" | Greenwood, Messinger | Messinger | 3:26 |
| 18. | "The Questions" | Greenwood, Messinger | Messiner | 3:10 |
| 19. | "Changes" | Greenwood, Messinger | Messinger | 7:29 |
| Total length: | | | | 58:36 |

Bonus track (later)
| No. | Title | Writer(s) | Producer(s) | Length |
|---|---|---|---|---|
| 5. | "Skills" (featuring Trevor McNevan of Thousand Foot Krutch) | Greenwood, Trevor McNevan, Messinger | Messinger | 4:05 |

== Personnel ==
-Numbers in parentheses symbolize track numbers

- Manafest - lead vocals, executive producer
- Jusachyl - additional vocals on track 11
- Relic the Oddity (Mark Morley) - additional vocals on track 14, scratching (1, 6, 7, 9)
- Aubrey "Bre" Noronha - vocals (track 13)
- Charles "DJ Versatile" Sabota - scratching (2, 3, 9, 18, 19)
- Trevor McNevan - additional vocals on bonus track 5
- John Gillard - guitar (track 14 only)
- Adam Messinger - mixing (select tracks)
- Rob Berger - vocals (track 5), mixing (select tracks)
- That Brotha Lokey (Gerhard Thomas) - producer
- Melanie Greenwood - photography, graphic design

== Music videos ==
- What I Got to Say on YouTube

Lyric videos

- Skills on YouTube

== Notes ==
- Track 4, 6, 7, 8, 17 & 19 off the album were re-released on Manafest's 2005 album Epiphany.
- "Childs of Light" is an old song from Under One King, the hip-hop group started by Chris Greenwood and his fellow rapper Jusachyl before he became Manafest.
- In 2004, Manafest released a My Own Thing vinyl EP which included the tracks "What I Got to Say", "Slang Talkin'", "Down Town", an alternate mix of "Down Town", and a few instrumental versions of the songs. The EP was released under Frontline Records.
