= That Should Be Me =

Song by Justin Bieber

from the album My World 2.0
- Released: March 19, 2010
- Recorded: 2010
- Genre: Country pop
- Length: 3:52
- Label: Island, RBMG
- Songwriters: Justin Bieber, Nasri Atweh, Adam Messinger, Luke Boyd
- Producer: The Messengers

Music video
- "That Should Be Me" on YouTube

"That Should Be Me" is a song by Canadian singer Justin Bieber, included as the tenth and final track on his first studio album, My World 2.0, released on March 19, 2010. The song was written by Bieber alongside Luke Boyd and Nasri Atweh and Adam Messinger of The Messengers, the production team who produced the track. "That Should Be Me" is an orchestral ballad in which Bieber sings about losing his love, and according to Monica Herrera of Billboard, plays the "scorned ex." Most music critics positively received the song, and it debuted at number ninety-two on the Billboard Hot 100 following the release of My World 2.0.

In December 2010, it was announced that Bieber would be working with American country band Rascal Flatts on new music, presumably for his second studio album. However it was revealed that "That Should Be Me" was remixed to include vocals from the country group for the release of Bieber's second remix album, Never Say Never: The Remixes, released to accompany the release of his 3D concert-documentary film Justin Bieber: Never Say Never. A music video was released to accompany the remixed version of the song, which premiered during Rascal Flatts' ABC special, Rascal Flatts: Nothing Like This Presented by JC Penney.

== Background and composition ==
"That Should Be Me"
A sample of "That Should Be Me," which is described as an "orchestral ballad."

"That Should Be Me" was co-written by Bieber alongside Luke Boyd, as well as Nasri Atweh and Adam Messinger of The Messengers, with the latter also producing the track. The song was recorded by The Messengers at NH Studios in North Hollywood, California. Instrumentation and all vocal arrangements were done by Atweh and Messinger. Additional engineering was performed by Pat Thrall, while the track was mixed by Manny Marroquin at Larrabee Studios, also in North Hollywood. The mix was assisted by Christian Plata and Erik Madrid, whereas Atweh and Luke Boyd perform background vocals on the song.

According to the sheet music published at Musicnotes.com by Sony/ATV Music Publishing, "That Should Be Me" is set in common time with a moderate tempo of 69 beats per minute. It is composed in the key of E-flat major and raises up half a step after the bridge with Bieber's vocal range spanning from the low-note of G_{3} to the high-note of C♯_{5}. The song follows in the chord progression of Cm–A♭_{2}–E♭–G/B. Described as a "sobbing" ballad by Monica Hererra of Billboard, Bieber "pleads the girl he left behind to take him back." Herrera called the ballad "orchestral" and said that Bieber plays the "scorned ex" in the song.

== Reception ==
Fraser McAlpine of British Broadcasting Corporation called the song the "grand finale" of My World 2.0, and said it "is going to cause nothing but emotional pandemonium in households and bedrooms all over the land." While criticizing the number of features on the album, Chris Richards of The Washington Post said, "Let him go it alone, and he can be quite the tear-jerker, as evidenced on 'That Should Be Me,' the album's closing track." Rudy Klapper of Sputnikmusic criticized Bieber's constant role as "teenage lothario" on the album, pointing out "That Should Be Me" as an example. After the release of My World 2.0, "That Should Be Me" debuted on the Billboard Hot 100 at number ninety-two, and spent one week on the chart. "That Should Be Me" also appeared on the UK Singles Chart at number 179. Following the release of Never Say Never: The Remixes in 2011, "That Should Be Me" charted on the Canadian Hot 100 at number ninety-nine.

== Remix ==
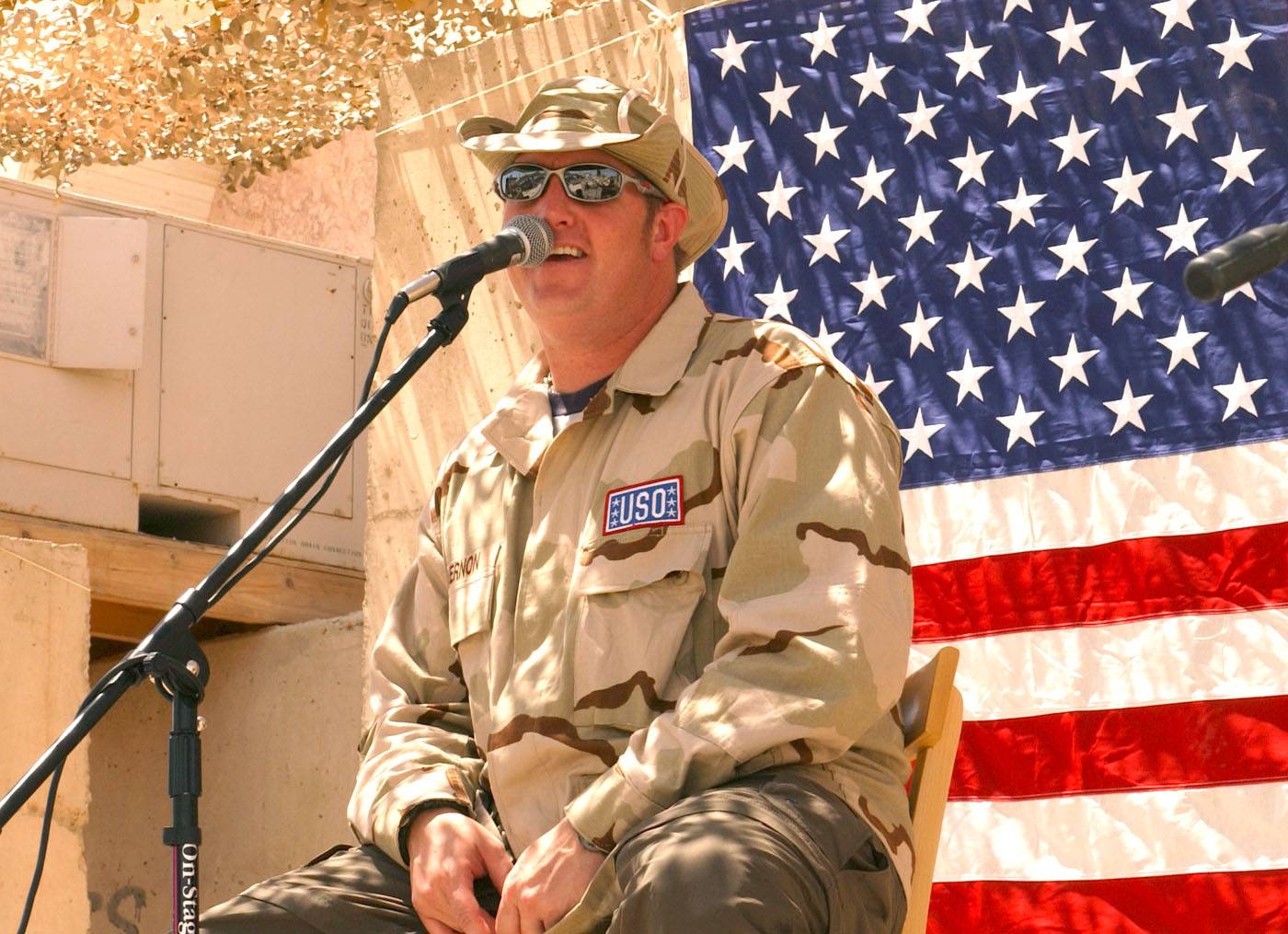
Gary LeVox, lead singer of Rascal Flatts

On December 20, 2010, Gary LeVox, frontman of American country band Rascal Flatts, revealed to radio station WSIX that the band was collaborating with Bieber, stating, "[Justin] asked us to do a duet with him on his next record. It's actually a really good song! The kid is really talented. He plays five or six different instruments really well." Bieber confirmed LeVox's statements, stating; "I love @RascalFlatts and Im honored that they are making music with me. And for those that don't know ... they have great records like this one. #GREATMUSIC." He then linked a fan video of his with Rascal Flatts' "My Wish" playing in the background. It was later revealed that the collaboration was for Bieber's Never Say Never: The Remixes, a remix album that included remixes from My World and My World 2.0, and a musical companion to his film, Justin Bieber: Never Say Never. On the remix, Melinda Newman of HitFix said "Bieber's and LeVox's voices create some nice harmony on an otherwise mundane song." Derek Evers of AOL Music said Bieber "looks really comfortable belting out a country tune."

== Music video ==
It was first revealed that Bieber and Rascal Flatts would be shooting a video for the remix version of the song when TMZ revealed photos on Bieber on set of the video shoot. The photos pictured Bieber after a dramatic haircut, changing his trademark style over the previous two years. The video premiered during the ABC special, Rascal Flatts: Nothing Like This Presented by JC Penney, which aired March 12, 2011. The video begins with Rascal Flatts arriving in a Cadillac Escalade to a studio. Inside, they are directed to Bieber, who is playing the keyboard. Bieber then sings his lines, playing guitar, and is joined by Joe Don Rooney also on guitar, and Jay DeMarcus now on keyboard. The woman who directed the band into the studio now directs them and Bieber into another room with lights, to film the video. Gary LeVox then sings his lines, joined by Bieber for the chorus while Rooney is on guitar and DeMarcus playing a grand piano. All are wearing black, with Bieber in particular wearing a leather jacket, his signature dog tag, and grey Supras sneakers. During the sequence of the video, more behind-the-scenes action is shown, before it ends with only Bieber's silhouette shown, as his jacket is on the ground.

The music video won the award for Collaborative Video of the Year at the 2011 CMT Music Awards on June 8, 2011.

== Credits and personnel ==
- Songwriting – Justin Bieber, Nasri Atweh, Adam Messinger, Luke Boyd
- Production – The Messengers, Nasri Atweh, Adam Messinger
- Vocal recording – The Messengers
- Vocal arrangement and instrumentation – The Messengers
- Engineering – Pat Thrall
- Mixing – Manny Marroquin, assisted by Christian Plata and Erik Madrid
- Background vocals – Atweh, Boyd

== Charts ==
Chart (2010–2011)	Peak position
Canada Hot 100 (Billboard)	99
UK Singles (OCC)	179
US Billboard Hot 100	92

Chart (2026)	Peak position
Global 200 (Billboard)	51
Greece International (IFPI)	59
Hong Kong (Billboard)	19
Indonesia (Billboard)	19
Malaysia (IFPI)	5
Malaysia International (RIM)	3
Netherlands (Single Tip)	5
Philippines Hot 100 (Billboard Philippines)	24
Portugal (AFP)	97
Singapore (RIAS)	20
Sweden Heatseeker (Sverigetopplistan)	11
Taiwan (Billboard)	3
Vietnam Hot 100 (Billboard)	29

== Certifications ==
Region	Certification	Certified units/sales
Australia (ARIA)	Platinum	70,000^{‡}
Brazil (Pro-Música Brasil)	Gold	30,000^{‡}
Denmark (IFPI Danmark)	Gold	45,000^{‡}
New Zealand (RMNZ)	Gold	15,000^{‡}
United Kingdom (BPI)	Silver	200,000^{‡}
United States (RIAA)	2× Platinum	2,000,000^{‡}
^{‡} Sales+streaming figures based on certification alone.
