= Conquering the Fear of Flight =

Studio album by Wavorly
- Released: June 12, 2007
- Studio: The Graveyard and Sound Kitchen (Franklin, Tennessee); Little Big Sound (Nashville, Tennessee)
- Genre: CCM, Christian rock, pop
- Length: 49:56
- Label: Flicker
- Producer: Rob Graves

Professional ratings
Review scores
Source	Rating
Jesus Freak Hideout	(4.5/5)
Patrol Magazine	(6.0/10)

Conquering the Fear of Flight is Wavorly's first album, which was released June 12, 2007 nationwide in the United States. The album has received significant attention from Christian press outlets. Two singles, "Madmen" and "Part One", have both reached No. 1 on Christian rock radio stations. "Praise and Adore (Some Live Without It)" and "Forgive and Forget" were also released as radio singles in 2007 and 2008.

== Track listing ==
No.	Title	Writer(s)	Length
1.	"Introducing"	Dave Stovall	1:03
2.	"Madmen"	Stovall, Matt Lott	2:57
3.	"Part One"	Stovall, Lott, Seth Farmer, Trevor McNevan	3:11
4.	"Stay With Me"	Stovall, Lott, Farmer	2:59
5.	"Praise and Adore"	Stovall, Lott, McNevan	4:04
6.	"Endless Day"	Stovall, Lott, Farmer, Ryan Coon	3:45
7.	"Sleeper"	Stovall, Lott, McNevan	4:14
8.	"A Summer's Song"	Stovall	3:46
9.	"Time I Understood"	Stovall, Rob Graves	5:27
10.	"Forgive and Forget"	Stovall, Lott, Farmer, Coon, Graves	3:32
11.	"How Have We Come This Far?"	Stovall, Lott, McNevan	4:16
12.	"Twenty Twenty"	Stovall, Lott, Farmer, Graves	5:30
13.	"Tale of the Dragon's Defeat"	Stovall, Lott, Coon	3:37
14.	"The Defeat"	Stovall	1:35
Total length:			49:56

== Personnel ==
Wavorly

- Dave Stovall – vocals, acoustic piano (1, 14), rhythm guitars
- Ryan Coon – keyboards
- Seth Farmer – lead guitars, vocals
- Matt Lott – bass
- Jaime Hays – drums

Additional musicians

- Rob Graves – digital programming
- Jackie Marushka – shaker

The Love Sponge Strings (1, 3–5, 7–11, 13, 14)

- John Catchings – cello
- Anthony LaMarchina – cello
- Kristin Wilkinson – viola
- David Angell – violin
- David Davidson – violin, string arrangements

=== Production ===
- Will McGinnis – executive producer
- Mark Stuart – executive producer
- Rob Graves – producer, recording, engineer, digital editing
- Tony Palacios – drum recording
- Daewoo Kim – string recording (1, 3–5, 7–11, 13, 14)
- Kenzi Butler – string recording assistant (1, 3–5, 7–11, 13, 14)
- Fred Paragano – additional digital editing
- Perry Sorenson – additional digital editing
- F. Reid Shippen – mixing
- Dan Shike – mastering at Tone and Volume Mastering (Nashville, Tennessee)
- Heather Hetzler – A&R production
- Ross Asher – production assistant
- Matthew Dragstrem – production assistant
- Eric Welsh – photography
- Annette Reischel – design, layout
- Stephanie McBrayer – stylist
- Robin Geary – hair
- Jim Stennett – management
