= Glory (Manafest album) =

Studio album by Manafest
- Released: September 26, 2006
- Recorded: 2006
- Genre: Christian hip hop, rap rock
- Length: 39:33
- Label: BEC
- Producer: Adam Messinger, Manafest

Manafest chronology
Epiphany (2005)	Glory (2006)	Citizens Activ (2008)

Professional ratings
Review scores
Source	Rating
AllMusic	4/5 stars
Cross Rhythms	7/10 stars
Jesus Freak Hideout	4/5 stars
Soulshine	3.5/5 stars

Glory is the third studio album by the Christian rapper Manafest. It was released on September 26, 2006 under BEC Recordings.

The release contains the single "Impossible", featuring Trevor McNevan of Thousand Foot Krutch.

== Critical reception ==
The album received very positive reviews from most professional music sites and reviews.

Justin Mabee of Jesus Freak Hideout praised the album saying: "Sophomore records seem to always be hard to make, even if a debut doesn't do as well as some artists would like. It seems that Manafest got some pointers and used them to his advantage, and with Glory, it blows his debut out of the water. This is definitely an album to check out, and keep an eye out for Manafest as his sound continues to mature." David Bain of Cross Rhythms commented: "BEC Recordings new signing Canadian Chris Greenwood, aka Manafest, has already been making quite a name for himself with his vibrant blend of hard rock and hip-hop rhythms. Not dissimilar to mainstream groups Linkin Park and the Beastie Boys, Manafest delivers a tight debut which at moments leaves one lost for breathe at the sheer energy on display." Lindsay Whitfield of Soulshine went on to say: "Manafest is able to empathize and offer positive solutions as to how he got out of his mess. How many rappers do you know who do that? Not many. Glory is a great album for those with a love for wordplay and listening to the best name in rap this side of the border."

=== Awards ===
The album was nominated for "Rap/Hip Hop Album of the Year" at the 38th annual GMA Dove Awards.

The album was also nominated for "Rap/Hip Hop Album of the Year" at the 29th annual GMA Canada Covenant Awards. The song "Bounce" off the release was awarded "Rap/Hip Hop Song of the Year" the same year. Manafest himself was also nominated for Artist of the Year for his work with Glory in 2007.

Furthermore, the album also received a nomination in the category of "Contemporary Christian/Gospel Album of the Year" for the Juno Awards of 2007.

== Track listing ==
Album release
No.	Title	Writer(s)	Producer(s)	Length
1.	"Don't Turn Away" (featuring Justin Humes)	Chris Greenwood, Adam Messinger	Adam Messinger, Manafest	3:35
2.	"Bounce"	Greenwood, Messinger	Messinger, Manafest	3:10
3.	"Runaway"	Greenwood, Messinger	Messinger, Manafest	3:18
4.	"Impossible" (featuring Trevor McNevan of Thousand Foot Krutch)	Greenwood, Messinger, Trevor McNevan	Trevor McNevan, Messinger, Manafest	3:58
5.	"Dreams"	Greenwood, Messinger	Messinger, Manafest	3:33
6.	"Retro Love"	Chris Stacey, Greenwood, Messinger	Chris Stacey, Messinger, Manafest	3:18
7.	"Critics" (featuring Promise)	Greenwood, Gerhard Thomas, Messinger, Aubrey Noronah, Jason Shepherd	That Brotha Lokey	3:35
8.	"Where Are You"	Greenwood, Stacey	Stacey	5:00
9.	"Wanna Know You"	Greenwood, Messinger	Messinger	2:58
10.	"Droppin' Hammers"	Greenwood, Messinger	Messinger, Manafest	3:29
11.	"Glory (You Are)"	Greenwood, Messinger	Messinger, Manafest	3:39
Total length:				39:33

Japanese edition bonus tracks
No.	Title	Writer(s)	Producer(s)	Length
12.	"Rodeo" (originally on Epiphany)	Greenwood, Stacey	Stacey, Manafest	3:14
13.	"Skills" (originally on Epiphany)	Greenwood, McNevan, Messinger	Messinger	3:10

Deluxe edition bonus tracks
No.	Title	Writer(s)	Producer(s)	Length
12.	"Out of Time" (originally on Japanese edition of Citizens Activ)	Greenwood, Messinger	Messinger, Manafest	3:41
13.	"Yahweh" (originally on Japanese edition of Citizens Activ)	Greenwood, Stacey	Stacey, Manafest	4:24
14.	"Impossible" (Kubiks remix)	Greenwood, Messinger, McNevan		4:37
15.	"Bounce" (Rock Jmac remix)	Greenwood, Messinger		3:13

== Personnel ==
- Manafest – lead vocals, executive producer
- Justin Humes (formerly of Velvet Empire) – additional vocals (1)
- Trevor McNevan – additional vocals (4), (13—Japan edition)
- Promise – additional vocals (7), backing vocals (12—deluxe edition)
- Liz Rodriguez – backing vocals (3)
- Surgeonia – backing vocals (6)
- Divine Trinity – backing vocals (7)
- Aubrey "Bre" Noronha – backing vocals (8, 11); (13—deluxe edition)
- Chris Stacey – backing vocals (8)
- The Surgeon – backing vocals (9)
- Daniel Galessiere – backing vocals (11)
- Charles "DJ Versatile" Sabota – cuts, scratching (10)
- Adam Messinger – mixing
- Jeff Carver – A&R
- Melanie Greenwood – art design, photography
- Chris Thompson – photography

== Music videos ==
- Bounce on YouTube
- Runaway on YouTube
- Impossible on YouTube

*Music videos for "Rodeo" and "Runaway" are also included on the Japanese edition of the album.

Lyric videos

- Where Are You on YouTube

== Notes ==
- The opening segment of "Don't Turn Away" is originally from the first verse of the song "Let It Go" (off Epiphany).
- In 2010, as with many of Manafest's releases, Glory was given an album instrumentals release.
- The deluxe edition bonus track remix of "Impossible" was originally released as an iTunes bonus track to Manafest's 2010 album The Chase.
- The song "Wanna Know You" was included in the soundtrack of the game Flatout Ultimate Carnage.
