= Misled Youth (EP) =

EP by Manafest
- Released: October 4, 2001
- Genre: Christian hip hop
- Length: 14:49
- Label: Manafest Productions
- Producer: That Brotha Lokey, Relic the Oddity, Manafest

Manafest chronology
| Misled Youth (2001) | My Own Thing (2003) |

Professional ratings
Review scores
| Source | Rating |
|---|---|
| Cross Rhythms | 7/10 stars |

Misled Youth is the debut EP and release by the Christian rapper Manafest. It was released independently on October 4, 2001.

== Awards ==
The track "Freedom" from the release won "Modern Rock/Alternative Song of the Year" at the 24th annual GMA Canada Covenant Awards.

== Track listing ==
| No. | Title | Writer(s) | Producer(s) | Length |
|---|---|---|---|---|
| 1. | "Freestylin'" | Chris Greenwood, Gerhard Thomas | That Brotha Lokey | 0:55 |
| 2. | "What's Going On" | Greenwood, Thomas, Adam Messinger | That Brotha Lokey | 4:10 |
| 3. | "Session" | Greenwood, Mark Morley | Relic the Oddity | 2:34 |
| 4. | "Freedom" | Greenwood, Messinger | Manafest | 3:14 |
| 5. | "Soul Searchin'" | Greenwood, Thomas, G. McMillian, Messinger | That Brotha Lokey | 3:56 |
| Total length: | | | | 14:49 |

== Personnel ==
- Manafest - lead vocals, executive producer
- Adam Messinger - mixing
- Nick Rawson - mastering
- Gerhard Thomas (That Brotha Lokey) - co-executive producer
- DeShaun "LINX" Jones - associate executive producer
- Melanie Cardoza - photography
- Shayne Ferguson - logo design
- Pasi Posti - director (for "Session" music video clip)

== Music videos ==
- Session on YouTube

== Notes ==
- According to Chris Greenwood, "Session" was the first track he ever wrote as Manafest.
- Besides this earliest known work, Manafest has released a 2000 demo song entitled "Mind Master" featuring Jusachyl. It was made available on the iTunes deluxe edition of Manafest's 2005 album Epiphany.
- The release is also referred to as Manafest the EP on the physical CD casing.
- If one acquires a physical CD copy of the EP, the music video clip for "Session" is included on the disc.
