= Adam Messinger =

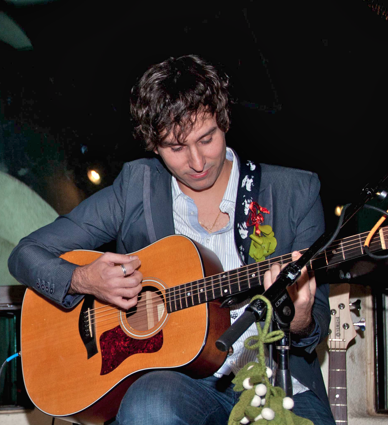

Background information
- Born: 12 March 1982 (age 44); Toronto, Ontario, Canada
- Genres: Pop; R&B; rock; jazz
- Occupations: record producer; songwriter; multi-instrumentalist
- Instruments: guitar, keyboards, vocals, bass, drums, programming

Adam "Messy" Messinger is a Grammy Award-winning Canadian-born record producer, songwriter, and multi-instrumentalist based in Los Angeles, California. He is a producer for Canadian reggae band Magic!, but was initially a producer/songwriter as a member of the production duo The Messengers — both along with Nasri Atweh — earning credits on a multitude of successful singles and albums.

== Career ==
Born in Toronto, Messinger started playing the piano at age five, and proceeded to develop skills for a variety of instruments, including sax, bass, guitar, and drums/percussion. After being enrolled in the Claude Watson School for the Arts program from grade 4 through to 13, he attended the music program at York University in Toronto, where he was awarded the Oscar Peterson Scholarship for Jazz studies two years consecutively. He received Juno Award nominations in 2001 and 2006 for his work with a cappella group Cadence. He also co-wrote the winning RnB song in the 2002 John Lennon Songwriting Contest. Along the way he also won two GMA Canada Covenant Awards in 2005 and 2009 for his work with rock/rapper Manafest.

In recent years, his partnership with fellow Canadian singer/songwriter Nasri (together often known as "The Messengers") has functioned as a writing and production team for such artists as Justin Bieber, Shakira, Pitbull, Christina Aguilera, Chris Brown, Halsey, Michael Bolton, Iggy Azalea, The Script, Kris Allen, Lea Michele, Cody Simpson, The Wanted, JoJo, Vanessa Hudgens, No Angels, Brandy and the New Kids on the Block. The Messengers work has resulted in two Grammy Award nominations for 2011 Best Pop Vocal Album - Justin Bieber (My World 2.0), 2011 Best Contemporary R&B Album - Chris Brown (Graffiti), and a win for 2012 Best RnB Album - Chris Brown (F.A.M.E.). As well, their collaboration between Justin Bieber and Rascal Flatts "That Should Be Me" won a 2011 CMT Music Award for Best Collaborative Video.

In 2015, Messinger earned the Juno Award for Producer of the Year for his work with Magic! and Iggy Azalea. He also won the International Achievement Award at the 2015 SOCAN Awards in Toronto for his success with the song "Rude".

== Partial discography ==
- Justin Bieber – Changes (Island / Def Jam)
  - "Changes": Writer, producer, musician
- Shania Twain - Queen Of Me (Universal / Republic)
  - "Queen Of Me": Producer, writer, musician
  - "Pretty Liar": Producer, writer, musician
- Halsey – Fifty Shades Darker: Original Motion Picture Soundtrack (Universal Studios / Republic)
  - "Not Afraid Anymore": Writer, producer, musician
- Magic! - Primary Colours (Sony Music International / Latium)
  - Album Producer
- Magic! - Don't Kill The Magic (Sony Music International / Latium)
  - Album Producer
  - "Rude": Writer, producer, musician
- Shakira – Shakira (Sony/RCA)
  - "You Don't Care About Me": Writer, producer, musician
  - "Cut Me Deep" (featuring MAGIC!): Writer, producer, musician
  - "The One Thing": Writer, producer, musician
- Pitbull – Global Warming (Mr. 305 / RCA)
  - "Feel This Moment" (featuring Christina Aguilera): Writer, producer, musician
  - "Hope We Meet Again" (featuring Chris Brown): Writer, producer, musician
- Iggy Azalea - The New Classic (Island / Def Jam)
  - "Change Your Life" (featuring T.I.): Writer, producer, musician
- Justin Bieber – Believe (Island / Def Jam)
  - "All Around the World": Writer, producer, musician
  - "Believe": Writer, producer, musician
  - "Just Like Them": Writer, co-producer, musician
- Chris Brown – Fortune (RCA)
  - "Don't Judge Me": Writer, producer, musician
  - "Your World": Writer, producer, musician
- Lea Michele – Louder (Columbia)
  - "Burn With You": Writer, producer, musician
- The Wanted - Word of Mouth (Island)
  - "We Own the Night"
- Justin Bieber – (Island / Def Jam)
  - "Turn to You (Mother's Day Dedication)": Producer, writer, musician
- Justin Bieber – Under the Mistletoe (Island / Def Jam)
  - "Mistletoe": Writer, producer, musician
  - "Christmas Love": Writer, producer, musician
- Justin Bieber – Never Say Never – The Remixes (Island / Def Jam)
  - "Never Say Never": Writer, producer, musician
  - "That Should Be Me (featuring Rascal Flatts)": Writer, producer, musician
  - "Up (featuring Chris Brown)": Writer, producer, musician
- Chris Brown – F.A.M.E. (Jive)
  - "Next 2 You": Writer, producer, musician
- Cody Simpson – Paradise (Atlantic)
  - "Paradise": Producer, writer, musician, mixer
  - "I Love Girls": Producer, writer, musician, mixer
- Justin Bieber – My Worlds Acoustic (Island / Def Jam)
  - "Pray": Writer, producer, musician
  - "Never Say Never": Writer, producer, musician
  - "That Should Be Me": Writer, producer, musician
- Justin Bieber – The Karate Kid (2010 film) (Columbia Pictures)
  - "Never Say Never": Writer, producer, musician
- Justin Bieber – My World 2.0 (Island / Def Jam)
  - "Up": Writer, producer, musician
  - "That Should Be Me": Writer, producer, musician
- Chris Brown – Graffiti (Jive)
  - "Crawl": Writer, producer, musician
- The Script – Freedom Child (Columbia)
  - "Arms Open": Writer, producer, musician
- Kris Allen – (19 Entertainment/RCA)
  - The Vision of Love (2012): Writer, producer, musician
- Chloe x Halle – The Kids Are Alright (Parkwood/Columbia)
  - "Happy Without Me"
- Sabrina Claudio – Fifty Shades Freed: Original Motion Picture Soundtrack (Universal Studios / Republic)
  - "Cross Your Mind"
- Sabrina Claudio – "Don't Let Me Down (featuring Khalid)"
- JoJo – Jumping Trains (Blackground / Interscope)
  - "Jumping Trains": Writer, producer, musician
  - "Play This Twice": Writer, producer, musician
- JoJo – Can't Take That Away From Me (Blackground / Interscope)
  - "Boy Without A Heart": Writer, producer, musician, mixer
- New Kids on the Block – The Block (Interscope)
  - "Stare At You": Writer, producer, musician, mixer
  - "Close To You": Writer, producer, musician, mixer
  - "Summertime": Vocal producer
  - "Single" (featuring Ne-Yo) : Vocal producer, mixer
  - "Click Click Click": Vocal producer
  - "Lights Camera Action": Vocal producer
  - "One Song": Vocal producer
- Michael Bolton – One World One Love (Universal Motown)
  - "Ready For You": Writer, producer, musician, mixer
  - "You Comfort Me": Writer, producer, musician, mixer
  - "My Lady": Writer, producer, musician, mixer
  - "Sign Your Name": Producer, musician, mixer
  - "Need You To Fall": Co-producer, musician, mixer
  - "Can You Feel Me": Co-producer, mixer
  - "Invisible Tattoo": Co-producer, musician, mixer
  - "Crazy Love": Co-producer, musician, mixer
- Cody Simpson – Coast to Coast (Atlantic)
  - "Not Just You"
  - "Angel"
- Javier Colon – Come Through For You (Universal Republic)
  - "How Many People Can Say That": Writer, Producer, musician, mixer
- Prince Royce – Phase II (Atlantic)
  - "Addicted": Producer, musician, mixer
- Lolene – Electrick Hotel (Capitol)
  - "Rich (Fake It Til You Make It)": Writer, producer, musician
- Vanessa Hudgens – Identified (Hollywood)
  - "Party on the Moon": Writer
- Brandy – Human (Epic)
  - "True": Musician
- No Angels – Welcome To The Dance (Universal)
  - "One Life": Co-producer, musician, mixer
  - "Young Love": Writer, producer, musician, mixer
  - "Too Old": Writer, producer, musician, mixer
  - "Say Goodbye" Writer, producer, musician, mixer
- The Cab - Symphony Soldier (Z Entertainment)
  - "Temporary Bliss"
- Alex Lambert – (19 Entertainment)
  - "I Didn't Know": Writer, producer, musician, mixer
- Marina Chello – (BadBoy)
  - "Sideline": Writer, producer, musician
- Eva Avila – Somewhere Else (Sony/BMG)
  - "I Owe It All To You": Writer
  - "Stop Crying": Writer
  - "Weak In The Knees": Writer
  - "Fallin For You": Producer, musician, mixer
- Eva Avila – Give Me the Music (Sony/BMG)
  - "What I Want (Not What I Need)": Writer
  - "Say Goodbye": Writer
- The Nylons – Play On: Producer, musician, mixer
- Ivana Santilli – TO.NY (Do Right): Writer, producer, musician, mixer
- Manafest – Citizens Activ (BEC): Writer, producer, musician, mixer
- Manafest – The Chase (BEC): Writer, producer, musician, mixer
- Manafest – Epiphany (BEC): Writer, producer, musician, mixer
- Manafest – Fighter (BEC): Writer, producer, musician, mixer
- Manafest – Glory (BEC): Writer, producer, musician, mixer
- Manafest – Live in Concert (BEC): Writer, producer
- Manafest – Misled Youth (Self-released): Writer, mixer
- Manafest – The Moment (BEC): Writer, producer, musician, mixer
- Manafest – My Own Thing (Self-released): Writer, producer, musician, mixer
- Manafest – Stones (Self-released): Writer, producer, instrumentation, mixer
- Manafest - Stones Reloaded (Self-released): Writer
- Cadence – Twenty For One: Producer, musician, mixer
- Cadence – Frost Free: Producer, musician, mixer
