= This Is Not the End (Manafest album) =

Studio album by Manafest
- Released: December 13, 2019
- Genre: Christian Rock, Christian Hip Hop, pop rap, rap metal
- Length: 32:10
- Label: Manafest Productions
- Producer: Doug Weier

Manafest chronology
Stones Reloaded (2018)	This Is Not the End (2019)	I Run With Wolves (2022)

This Is Not the End is the tenth studio album by Canadian Christian rapper Manafest. It was independently released on December 13, 2019. The release was fan-funded through a Kickstarter campaign.

== Background ==
On March 18, 2019, Manafest released a teaser for a new song entitled "Come Back Home" on his YouTube channel. A few days later, the track publicly debuted on March 21, 2019. A music video for the track premiered on April 19, 2019.

On July 19, 2019, Manafest released a single: "This Is Not the End". On September 6, 2019, he released "Plan for Me". This was followed by a music video for the song on September 11. On September 17, 2019, he announced that he was creating a new album, This Is Not The End, that would release before the end of the year in early December. An independent Kickstarter campaign proceeded to be launched the same day to raise funds for the record's creation.

On October 4, 2019, he premiered the audio for a fourth track: "Kamikaze". He also released a four-song EP of the tracks that had been released publicly.

== Singles ==
On May 21, 2019, Manafest publicly released the single "Come Back Home" on YouTube. The track was available for download the day after its debut.

On July 19, 2019, Manafest released the title track "This Is Not the End" as the second single off the upcoming album.

On September 6, 2019, Manafest premiered "Plan for Me". The track was the singing debut of both Greenwood's wife and daughter.

Each single was accessible to Manafest's Patreon supporters up to a month before being debuted to the public.

== Critical reception ==
James Larsen of Jesus Freak Hideout states that, "Manafest has created a solid record that will be well-received by his fans, and those who still listen to this style of music", going on to say that "there are some shortcomings, especially when it comes to the repetitive, more boastful tracks (such as 'All Time High' and 'Born for This')", but indicating that, "despite that, This Is Not the End is still an enjoyable album, and the title track, 'Plan for Me' and 'Come Back Home' are gems that make it well worth a listen". Lins Honeyman of Cross Rhythms stated that the album "kicks off with the explosive title track which promotes a message of hope amidst adversity delivered with chunky guitar riffs, thundering drums and shouted vocals". CCM Magazine wrote that "Plan For Me" is "a song that will not only grace the ears but pull the heart strings".

== Track listing ==
This Is Not the End track listing
No.	Title	Length
1.	"This Is Not the End"	3:35
2.	"All Time High"	2:54
3.	"Kamikaze"	3:48
4.	"Wake Me Up"	3:27
5.	"Plan for Me" (featuring Melanie Greenwood and London Greenwood)	3:19
6.	"Born for This" (featuring Max Manon)	2:19
7.	"Come Back Home" (featuring Trevor McNevan of Thousand Foot Krutch)	2:59
8.	"Grenades"	3:37
9.	"Insomnia"	3:22
10.	"I Made It"	2:50
Total length:		32:10
