= Citizens Activ =

Studio album by Manafest
- Released: May 28, 2008
- Recorded: 2007
- Genres: Christian hip hop, pop rap, rap rock
- Length: 36:55
- Label: BEC
- Producers: Adam Messinger, Boi-1da, Arion, Chris Stacey, Josh Macintosh

Manafest chronology
Glory (2006)	Citizens Activ (2008)	The Chase (2010)

Professional ratings
Review scores
Source	Rating
Exclaim!	(Negative)
Cross Rhythms	8/10 stars
Crosswalk.com	(Positive)
Jesus Freak Hideout	3.5/5 stars
New Release Tuesday	4/5 stars
Rapzilla	(Average)

Citizens Activ is the fourth studio album by the Christian rapper Manafest. It was released on May 28, 2008 in Japan and shortly after released globally on June 24, under BEC Recordings.

The release contains the singles "4-3-2-1", "So Beautiful", and "Good Day".

== Critical reception ==
The album received positive to average reviews overall, with only a few musical sites being negative in their evaluations.

Both staff reviews from New Release Tuesday praised the album heavily. Kevin McNeese stated "this album takes everything we love about KJ-52, everything we hate about Enimem [sic], and wraps it in an extremely tight package that glorifies God, has some fun with everyday relationships and gives Christian rap a new tent-pole project to tout." Nathan of NRT went on to add that "even people who are not fans of the rap genre may find themselves hopping on Manafest's band wagon -- at least for Citizens Activ. His tunes are just diverse enough to move past basic rap, and the rock he sprinkles in is also helpful. Add his meaningful lyrics and you have got a solid album despite the repetitive beats." Justin Mabee of Jesus Freak Hideout conquered by saying "while Citizens Activ may not be as up to par as his last release, Manafest has definitely matured since his debut and showcases those changes on this new release. Rock-infused raps abound, and fans of the rapper will likely find plenty to love here, adding on another record to their collection." Finally, Andy Argyrakis of Crosswalk.com plainly said when complementing the spiritual depth of the album: "Manafest shines with a meaningful centering and corresponding soundtrack he can just as easily take to church youth group kids as he can the inner city streets."

On the flip side, Rapzilla stated frankly in a more neutral opinion on the album: "Citizens Activ has a plethora of musical styles ranging from pop, rock, and rap. I would think that this will be as successful as his critically acclaimed Glory disc, commercially. But after listening to it, I can't really find myself attracted to this new manifestation of Manafest's manifesto." Omar Mouallem of Exclaim! went on to say in a very negative opinion that "lyrically, he (Manafest) is about as innocuous as a bobble-head, which may or may not have something to do with his status as Christian rap. Manafest delivers the type of rap you wouldn't mind your children listening to, so long as they outgrow it before high school."

=== Awards ===
The album was nominated for "Best Hip-Hop/Rap Album of the Year" at the 40th annual GMA Dove Awards. The song "So Beautiful" off the release was also nominated for "Rap/Hip-Hop Recorded Song of the Year".

The album was also nominated for "Rap/Hip Hop Album of the Year" at the 30th annual GMA Canada Covenant Awards. The song "Good Day" off the release was also nominated for "Rap/Hip Hop Song of the Year" the same year. The following year, the song "4-3-2-1" won "Rap/Hip Hop Song of the Year". Manafest himself was also nominated for Artist of the Year for his work with Citizens Activ in 2009.

== Track listing ==
Album release
No.	Title	Writer(s)	Producer(s)	Length
1.	"4-3-2-1"	Chris Greenwood, Adam Messinger	Adam Messinger, Manafest	2:41
2.	"So Beautiful" (featuring Trevor McNevan of Thousand Foot Krutch)	Greenwood, Messinger, Trevor McNevan	Messinger, Manafest	3:30
3.	"Steppin' Out"	Greenwood, Messinger	Messinger, Manafest	2:37
4.	"Good Day"	Greenwood, Messinger	Messinger, Manafest	2:43
5.	"Free"	Greenwood, Matthew Samuels	Boi-1da, Messinger	3:57
6.	"Break Up"	Greenwood, Chris Stacey, Messinger	Manafest, Chris Stacey	3:30
7.	"Top of the World"	Greenwood, Messinger	Arion, Messinger	3:20
8.	"Kick It" (featuring Trevor McNevan of Thousand Foot Krutch)	Greenwood, McNevan, Josh Macintosh	Josh Macintosh, Messinger	3:12
9.	"Lean On Me"	Greenwood, Messinger	Arion, Messinger	3:13
10.	"Turn It Up"	Greenwood, Samuels	Boi-1da, Messinger	4:00
11.	"Live On"	Greenwood, Stacey	Stacey, Manafest	4:12
Total length:				36:55

Japanese edition bonus tracks
No.	Title	Writer(s)	Producer(s)	Length
12.	"Out of Time"	Greenwood, Messinger	Messinger, Manafest	3:41
13.	"Yahweh"	Greenwood, Stacey	Stacey, Manafest	4:25

== Personnel ==
- Manafest - lead vocals, executive producer
- Trevor McNevan - additional vocals on tracks 2 & 8
- Stacey Kaniuk - backing vocals on track 4
- Madison Jefferson - backing vocals on track 10
- Eden Jefferson - backing vocals on track 10
- Aubrey "Bre" Noronha - backing vocals on tracks 11 & 13
- Promise - backing vocals on track 12
- Adam Messinger - mixing (all tracks), mastering
- Rob Berger - mixing on tracks 5, 6, 7, 8, 10, 11 & 13
- Zale "Zalezy" Epstein - additional production on track 5
- Al-Khaaliq (Nick Brongers) - additional production on track 10
- Charles "DJ Versatile" Sabota - cuts; Scratching on track 10
- Jeff Carver - A&R
- Melanie Greenwood - art direction, photography
- Donna Milanka - photography
- Janice Kim - illustration

== Music videos ==
- 4-3-2-1 on YouTube
- So Beautiful on YouTube

== Notes ==
- In 2009, Manafest began to release a series of album instrumentals for many of his releases. Citizens Activ was the first to receive such a version.
- In 2013, the two bonus tracks featured on the Japanese release of the album were re-released on the deluxe edition of Manafest's previous album Glory.
- In 2018, the song "4-3-2-1" appeared in "What the Puck", the eighth episode of Season 3 of the Lethal Weapon TV series.
