= Fighter (Manafest album) =

Studio album by Manafest
- Released: April 10, 2012
- Genre: Alternative metal, rapcore, alternative rock, Christian rock
- Length: 36:10
- Label: BEC
- Producer: Seth Mosley, Adam Messinger

Manafest chronology
Live in Concert (2011)	Fighter (2012)	Stories Since Seventy Nine (2012)

Alternative cover
- Japan edition album cover

Professional ratings
Review scores
Source	Rating
AbsolutePunk	7.7/10
The Christian Music Review Blog	9/10 stars
Crosswalk.com	(Average)
Indie Vision Music	4/5 stars
Jesus Freak Hideout	3.5/5 stars
Mezzic.com	5.4/10
New Release Tuesday	4.5/5 stars

Fighter is the sixth studio album by the Christian rapper Manafest. It was released on April 10, 2012 under BEC Recordings. The album was, in majority, produced by Seth Mosley (of Newsboys producer fame).

== Critical reception ==
The album received overall general positive praise from multiple professional music sites and reviews.

Sarah Fine of New Release Tuesday gave the release very high praise and went on to state the album was "lyrically intense, the musicianship on this record is nearly flawless." With a fair amount of positive endorsement, Timothy Estabrooks of Jesus Freak Hideout stated that "Fighter is a fun, upbeat rap rock album with a pleasantly encouraging message. Fans of Manafest and the genre in general will find plenty to like here." Indie Vision Music's own Lee Brown approvingly reported "With singular focus, Fighter takes the listener through the hollow shells of life we as fallen humans often find ourselves clinging to and encourages us to fight for a newness of life that can only be found through God. Musically, Fighter is a solid album with a style that fans of Thousand Foot Krutch and Skillet should be right at home with."

On the flipside, Glenn McCarthy of Crosswalk.com frankly stated, in a more average outlook of the release: "Despite Manafest's simmering intensity, the production of Adam Messinger and Seth Mosley doesn’t provide these songs with enough personality, leaving the mix just short of a rock snarl when that would be called for, and other times scrubbing the mix up to a pop sheen." He further went on to say that "This one-two punch of blazing spirit and back-against-the-wall verve could just be the thing that endears Fighter to fans." Finally, Ryan G. of Mezzic.com pointed out "Longtime fans risk being bothered by the lack of hip hop verses, while new fans will probably love it."

=== Awards ===
The album was nominated in the category of "Hip-Hop/Rap Album of the Year" for the 44th annual GMA Dove Awards.

== Fighter book release ==
On September 15, 2013, Manafest released his first book entitled Fighter: Five Keys to Conquering Your Fear and Reaching Your Dreams. The title of the book was based from the album's name. The books's genre is semi-autobiographical, while also doubling as motivational.

== Singles ==
The three singles released for the album were "Never Let You Go", "Human", and the title track of "Fighter". The title song itself also made it into the Top 5 on the ChristianRock.Net radio chart singles.

== Track listing ==
Album release
No.	Title	Writer(s)	Length
1.	"Fighter"	Chris Greenwood, Seth Mosley	2:56
2.	"Throw It Away"	Greenwood, Adam Messinger	3:26
3.	"Pushover"	Greenwood, Mosley	3:13
4.	"Human"	Greenwood, Messinger	3:33
5.	"Come Alive"	Josh Macintosh, Greenwood, Mosley	3:12
6.	"Never Let You Go"	Greenwood, Mosley	3:28
7.	"Not Alone"	Greenwood, Mosley, Juan Otero	3:14
8.	"Prison Break"	Macintosh, Greenwood, Mosley	3:22
9.	"Heart Attack"	Greenwood, Trevor McNevan, Mosley	3:09
10.	"Will You Catch Me"	Greenwood, Seth Mosley	3:07
11.	"Never Let You Go" (Joel Bruyere Acoustic Mix)	Greenwood, Mosley	3:29
Total length:			36:10

Japanese edition bonus track/iTunes single (later)
No.	Title	Writer(s)	Length
1.	"Kimi Wa Fighter"	Greenwood, Mosley	2:59

== Personnel ==
- Manafest - lead vocals, executive producer
- Seth Mosley - producer on all tracks (except 2 & 4)
- Adam Messinger - producer and mixing on tracks 2 & 4
- Josh Macintosh - producer on track 5 & 8
- Joel Bruyere (of Thousand Foot Krutch) - mixing on all tracks (except 2 & 4)
- Phil Demetro - mastering
- Melanie Greenwood - graphic design, photography

== Chart performance ==
Chart (2012)	Peak position
Billboard Heatseekers Albums	7
Billboard Christian Albums	16
Billboard Hot Christian Songs: "Human"	50
Billboard Hot Christian Songs: "Never Let You Go"	45

- AllMusic records "Human" peaking at No. 30 and "Never Let You Go" peaking at No. 33.

== Music videos ==
- Fighter on YouTube
- Fighter 2.0 on YouTube
- Throw It Away on YouTube
- Pushover on YouTube
- Human on YouTube
- Never Let You Go on YouTube
- Kimi-Wa Fighter on YouTube

Lyric videos

- Fighter on YouTube
- Human on YouTube
- Never Let You Go on YouTube

== Notes ==
- The Japanese exclusive track of "Kimi Wa Fighter" is an altered version of the album's title track with re-written lyrics specifically directed to the people of Japan as an encouragement and response regarding the 2011 Tōhoku earthquake and tsunami. Manafest also sings the pre-chorus and chorus in Japanese. It was later re-released on iTunes as a single, separate from the album.
- Respectively, if one buys a copy of the Japanese edition of Fighter, they are given an altered track listing. The title track "Fighter" becomes track 11 and the Japanese bonus track "Kimi Wa Fighter" becomes track 1. The original track 11 of "Never Let You Go (Joel Bruyere Acoustic Mix)" is however removed from the album in its entirety.
- Fighter is the first Manafest album to not have a single track featuring Trevor McNevan of Thousand Foot Krutch.
- In 2012, as with many of Manafest's releases, Fighter was given an album instrumentals release.
- Because of this album's release, Manafest fans have since become known officially as "Fighters" amongst the themselves, as well as Manafest himself.
