= Manafest =

Canadian musician (born 1979)

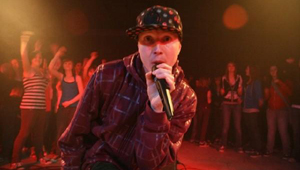
- Manafest performing in 2010

Background information
- Born: Christopher Scott Greenwood; July 19, 1979 (age 47)
- Origin: Pickering, Ontario, Canada
- Genres: Christian hip hop; Christian rock; rap rock; rapcore; alternative rock; nu metal; alternative metal
- Occupations: Rapper; singer; songwriter
- Years active: 2000–present
- Label: BEC
- Website: manafest.com

Christopher Scott Greenwood (born July 19, 1979), known by his stage name Manafest, is a Canadian Christian rapper and rock musician from Pickering, Ontario. He has won multiple awards for the GMA Canada Covenant Awards, GMA Dove Awards, and has been nominated for multiple Juno Awards. Signed for a decade with BEC Recordings, Manafest became independent in 2015.

== History ==
After a skateboarding accident in 1998, Greenwood shifted his focus to musical writing. He and fellow rapper Jusachyl started a hip-hop group, Under One King. During this time, Greenwood used his skater nickname 'Speedy' as his moniker. In 2000, Greenwood shifted to the stage name Manafest and began to produce music independently.

In 2001, Manafest debuted his EP, Misled Youth. The release garnered "Modern Rock/Alternative Song of the Year" for the song "Freedom" at the GMA Canada Covenant Awards in 2002. The following year, Manafest released his first full-length album My Own Thing and attracted the notice of Trevor McNevan of the Ontario-based rock band Thousand Foot Krutch. This led to his signing with an internationally distributed label, BEC Recordings under the Uprok Records label.

After signing on with BEC, he released his second album Epiphany in 2005, The release achieved several nominations and awards.

He released his third album, Glory, in 2006,. The album won the Rap/Hip Hop Album of the Year at the 2007 GMA Canada Covenant Awards, as well a nomination for Artist of the Year. The album also marked Manafest's first release to be nominated in the Juno Awards.

In 2008, his fourth album, Citizens Activ, received many nominations and awards. The album boosted Manafest's fame and reputation in Japan immensely.

In 2010, Manafest debuted his fifth full-length album The Chase. The album was well-received with the single "Avalanche" charting on the Billboard Christian Songs, as well as selling over 50,000 copies of the track as of September 2011. The album showcased a directional change for Manafest, moving from a more straight hip hop flare to a heavier rock-based rap style.

In 2011, Manafest released his first live album Live in Concert. The album won "Rap/Hip Hop Album of the Year" at the 33rd GMA Canada Covenant Awards.

In 2012, he released his sixth studio album of Fighter. The album continued the previous release's heavy rock influence and garnered a nomination for Hip-Hop/Rap Album of the Year in the GMA Dove Awards. Because of this album's release, Manafest fans have since become known officially as "Fighters" amongst themselves, as well as Manafest himself.

In late 2013, he released his first Christmas single "California Christmas", featuring Joel Piper. In 2014, he released his seventh album The Moment. The genre of the release deviated from his hard rock style and featured a more electronic hip hop sound.

In late 2014, he released the single "Let Go", featuring Dave Stovall of Wavorly. The track was a song that didn't make the final cut of The Moment and was later released by itself. The song was briefly pulled from iTunes. He also hinted it might make his next album's track listing.

He started a PledgeMusic campaign for Reborn on April 24, 2015. The album released globally on October 2, 2015.

On their 2016 album Hold the Light, Bread of Stone featured Manafest on the track "Battleground".

On February 20, 2017, he launched a Kickstarter project for Stones. It was independently released on July 21, 2017. In May 2018, he launched another PledgeMusic campaign to fund Stones Reloaded, a remix album and companion piece to the original album. The release was fully funded and publicly released on September 21, 2018.

On September 17, 2019, after releasing several singles earlier in the year, he announced a new crowdfunding campaign in order to fund his tenth studio album This Is Not The End. The album was released on December 13, 2019.

Manafest released his eleventh album I Run With Wolves on May 6, 2022, featuring Sonny Sandoval of P.O.D. on the track "Nemesis".

== Musical style and influences ==
Manafest's genre has developed and changed over his career. After starting with a classic urban hip hop style for his first four releases, Manafest developed a style of alternative rock and rap rock by lightly mixing it into Citizens Activ, and integrating it by the time of The Chase. In 2014, with the release of The Moment, Manafest's style changed to a mixture of rap rock and electronic-based hip-hop.

== Discography ==
Studio albums

- My Own Thing (2003)
- Epiphany (2005)
- Glory (2006)
- Citizens Activ (2008)
- The Chase (2010)
- Fighter (2012)
- The Moment (2014)
- Reborn (2015)
- Stones (2017)
- This Is Not the End (2019)
- I Run with Wolves (2022)
- Learning How to Be Human (2024)
- Silent Beast (2024)
- Walking into Fire (2025)
- Sleep Walker Awake (2026)

== Awards and nominations ==
GMA Canada Covenant Awards

- 2002 Modern Rock/Alternative Song of the Year: "Freedom"
- 2005 Rap/Hip-Hop Album of the Year: Epiphany
- 2005 Rap/Hip Hop Song of the Year: "Let It Go" (with Nasri Atweh, Adam Messinger, Aubrey Noronha and Gerhard Thomas)
- 2006 nominee, Video of the Year: "Rodeo"
- 2007 Rap/Hip Hop Album of the Year: Glory
- 2007 Rap/Hip Hop Song of the Year: "Bounce"
- 2007 nominee, Artist of the Year
- 2008 nominee, Rap/Hip Hop Album of the Year: Citizens Activ
- 2008 nominee, Rap/Hip Hop Song of the Year: "Good Day" (with Adam Messinger)
- 2009 Rap/Hip Hop Song of the Year: "4-3-2-1" (with Adam Messinger)
- 2009 nominee, Artist of the Year
- 2010 Rap/Hip Hop Album of the Year: The Chase
- 2011 Rap/Hip Hop Album of the Year: Live In Concert
- 2011 Rap/Hip Hop Song of the Year: "Avalanche"

GMA Dove Awards

- 2007 nominee, Rap/Hip-Hip Recorded Song of the Year: "Skills"
- 2007 nominee, Rap/Hip-Hop Recorded Album of the Year: Glory
- 2009 nominee, Rap/Hip-Hip Recorded Song of the Year: "So Beautiful"
- 2009 nominee, Rap/Hip-Hop Recorded Album of the Year: Citizens Activ
- 2012 nominee, Rap/Hip-Hop Recorded Album of the Year: Fighter

Juno Awards

- 2007 nominee, Contemporary Christian/Gospel Album of the Year: Glory
- 2011 nominee, Contemporary Christian/Gospel Album of the Year: The Chase
- 2015 nominee, Contemporary Christian/Gospel Album of the Year: The Moment
- 2017 nominee, Contemporary Christian/Gospel Album of the Year: Reborn
- 2018 nominee, Contemporary Christian/Gospel Album of the Year: Stones

== Touring band ==
Though a solo artist himself, Manafest travels with a touring band. Adam Messinger has provided the majority of instrumentation for Manafest's studio releases throughout the years, while the band supplies the music live on tour and at shows:

Current

- Josh Macintosh — lead guitar (2010–present)
- John Panzer – rhythm guitar (2016–present)
- Ian Hough – bass (2015–present)
- Tyler Armenta – drums (2016–present)

Former

- Mike Crofts – bass (2010–2015)
- Joe Rickard – drums (2014–2016)
- Travis Blackmore – drums (2010–2013)

== Guest appearances ==
Song(s)	Artist	Album	Year
"Abortion"	7Life	For What It's Worth	2003
"The Real"	N.I.F.T.Y.	The Preface EP	2004
"The Seed" (remix)	Aubrey Noronha	Single	2013
"Battleground"	Bread of Stone	Hold the Light	2016

== Personal life ==
In 1984, at the age of five, Chris Greenwood lost his father to suicide, leaving only him, his sister Virginia, and his mother. A few years after, at a Bible camp, he accepted Christ and became a Christian. At the same camp, he also met his future wife, Melanie. Around the age of fourteen, Greenwood invested himself into skateboarding and aspired to make it a career. He however experienced an accident in 1998 which crippled his dreams to become a professional skater. Greenwood later began songwriting and started his career as a Christian artist.

In 2003, Greenwood married his wife Melanie Cardoza. They have a daughter.

In 2012, Greenwood and his wife moved to Los Angeles, California. In October 2015, he and his family moved back to Toronto, Canada.
