= The Chase (Manafest album) =

Studio album by Manafest
- Released: March 30, 2010
- Genre: Christian rock, alternative metal, rapcore, alternative rock
- Length: 39:03
- Label: BEC, Uprok
- Producer: Adam Messinger

Manafest chronology
Citizens Activ (2008)	The Chase (2010)	Live in Concert (2011)

Professional ratings
Review scores
Source	Rating
AllMusic	3.5/5 stars
Christian Music Zine	(B−)
Cross Rhythms	9/10 stars
Indie Vision Music	4/5 stars
Jesus Freak Hideout	4/5 stars
Rapzilla	3/5 stars

The Chase is the fifth studio album by the Christian rapper Manafest. It was released on March 30, 2010, under BEC Recordings, in association with Uprok Records.

The single "Avalanche" off the release has sold 50,000 copies as of September 1, 2011.

== Critical reception ==
The album was met with generally positive and praiseworthy reviews with many calling it Manafest's best album yet.

Wayne Myatt of Jesus Freak Hideout positively highlighted the album and stated that "The Chase is an enjoyable album with so much variety that it never seems to become tedious. Releases like this one don't come around too often, so if you crave rock and rap, it doesn't get better than this." Indie Vision Music gave the album similar approval by saying "this is an outstanding album by Manafest, and his best work to date. If you liked his older albums and his fusion of rock and hip-hop then this album is exactly what you need. Manafest brings some big guitars to the party that do not disappoint." Alex Henderson of AllMusic went on to say "this is a respectable, if less than groundbreaking, contribution to rap-rock and rapcore."

On the flipside, in a more moderate review, Rapzilla noted "With the release of The Chase, it seems like the artist has finally become comfortable in his own skin, categorizing his project as rock rather than rap. And I'd say he's somewhere on the spectrum between Linkin and limp kinda like Fort Minor. This may disappoint some of his longtime fans, but it will more than likely gain him far more fans than he will lose." Finally, Tyler Hess of Christian Music Zine frankly stated "The Chase is Manafest’s fourth label release and it appears that he has learned to mix up his hip hop with some rock, some boy band ballads and most importantly enough diversity to keep an entire album interesting enough throughout, with a pace fast enough that The Chase feels like its over before it's really begun. Maybe it isn't really fitting with the trends, going back in time instead of pushing forward, but if you can let that go then you can probably still enjoy the latest from Manafest."

=== Awards ===
The album won "Rap/Hip Hop Album of the Year" at the 32nd annual GMA Canada Covenant Awards. The following year, the song "Avalanche" off the release won "Rap/Hip Hop Song of the Year".

The album also received a nomination in the category of "Contemporary Christian/Gospel Album of the Year" for the Juno Awards of 2011.

== Singles ==
In early January 2010, "No Plan B" was released as a single, while the song "Avalanche" was released as a single on March 12.

"Avalanche" reached No. 4 on the CHR charts in September, 2010. This was followed by "Bring the Ruckus" which reached No. 1 on the CHR charts in August, 2011.

"No Plan B" reached No. 1 on ChristianRock.Net's charts, while "Bring the Ruckus" made it into the Top 5 as well.

Besides these, the singles "Fire in the Kitchen" and "Every Time You Run" were also released off the album.

== Track listing ==
Album release
No.	Title	Writer(s)	Producer(s)	Length
1.	"No Plan B"	Chris Greenwood, Adam Messinger	Adam Messinger, Manafest	3:23
2.	"Fire in the Kitchen" (featuring Trevor McNevan of Thousand Foot Krutch)	Greenwood, Messinger	Messinger, Manafest	2:48
3.	"Supernatural"	Josh Macintosh, Greenwood, Messinger	Messinger, Josh Macintosh	3:55
4.	"Every Time You Run" (featuring Trevor McNevan of Thousand Foot Krutch)	Trevor McNevan, Greenwood, Messinger	Messinger, Trevor McNevan	3:34
5.	"Bring the Ruckus"	Macintosh, Greenwood, Messinger	Messinger, Macintosh	3:37
6.	"Avalanche"	Greenwood, Messinger	Messinger, Manafest	3:11
7.	"Married in Vegas"	Greenwood, Messinger	Messinger, Manafest	4:05
8.	"Renegade" (featuring Trevor McNevan of Thousand Foot Krutch)	Greenwood, Messinger, McNevan	Messinger, Manafest	3:37
9.	"The Chase"	Greenwood, Messinger	Messinger, Manafest	3:05
10.	"Better 'Cause of You" (featuring Dustin Anstey)	Greenwood, Tyson Kuteyi, Dustin Anstey	Tyson Kuteyi	4:10
11.	"Breaking Down the Walls" (featuring Dustin Anstey)	Greenwood, Kuteyi, Anstey	Kuteyi	3:39
Total length:				39:03

Japanese edition tracks/bonus tracks
No.	Title	Writer(s)	Producer(s)	Length
6.	"Avalanche" (alternate version)		Messinger, Manafest	3:11
10.	"Better 'Cause of You" (alternate version)		Kuteyi	3:55
11.	"No Plan B" (Kubiks remix)		Messinger, Manafest	3:29
12.	"No Plan B" (featuring Kenta Koie of Crossfaith)	Greenwood, Messinger, Kenta Koie	Messinger, Manafest	3:22
Total length:				42:02

iTunes bonus tracks
No.	Title	Writer(s)	Length
12.	"Impossible" (Kubiks remix)	Greenwood, Messinger	4:37
13.	"Every Time You Run" (radio cut)	McNevan, Greenwood, Messinger	3:27

Avalanche - No Plan B EP
No.	Title	Length
1.	"Avalanche"	3:09
2.	"Avalanche" (Big Cinema remix)	3:55
3.	"No Plan B"	3:23
4.	"No Plan B" (featuring Kenta Koie of Crossfaith)	3:22
5.	"No Plan B" (Kubiks remix)	3:37

2019 remix singles
No.	Title	Writer(s)	Length
1.	"Renegade" (Doug Weier remix)	Greenwood, Messinger, McNevan	3:21
2.	"No Plan B" (Doug Weier remix)	Greenwood, Messinger	3:28

== Personnel ==
-Numbers in parentheses symbolize track numbers

- Manafest - lead vocals, executive producer
- Trevor McNevan - additional vocals on track 2, 4 & 8
- Dustin Anstey - additional vocals, guitars, bass, drums: track 10 & 11
- Kenta Koie (of Crossfaith) - additional vocals on track 12 (Japan edition)
- Adam Messinger - backing vocals (1, 3, 5, 6, 12), all instrumentation (1, 2, 4, 6, 7, 8, 9, 12), additional instrumentation (3, 5), mixing on all tracks except 10 & 11
- Josh Macintosh - guitars, bass, drums: track 3 & 5
- Tyson Kuteyi - keyboards, additional drum programming, mixing: track 10 & 11
- Phil Demetro - mastering
- Jeff Carver - A&R
- Melanie Greenwood - art direction, graphic design, photography
- Chris Stacey - photography

== Chart performance ==
Chart (2010)	Peak position
Billboard Hot Christian Songs: "Avalanche"	41

== Music videos ==
- No Plan B (featuring Kenta Koie of Crossfaith) on YouTube
- Fire in the Kitchen on YouTube
- Every Time You Run on YouTube
- Bring the Ruckus on YouTube
- Avalanche on YouTube
- Renagade on YouTube

== Notes ==
- If one buys the Japanese edition of the album, they are treated to two extra versions of "No Plan B" and a slightly altered lyrical version of "Avalanche" in place of the original version on the base release. The track "Breaking Down the Walls" is however absent from the album.
- Depending on the edition of the album, the song "Better Cause of You" varies in its opening. The Japanese edition of the track has a heavily shortened opening musical segment compared to the base release.
- In September 2010, a singles EP entitled Avalanche / No Plan B was released. It contained the two original songs of the EP title's name, a remix for "Avalanche", the Japanese version of "No Plan B" featuring Kenta Koie of Crossfaith, and the two music videos for each individual track.
- In 2010, as with many of Manafest's releases, The Chase was given an album instrumentals release.
- On January 11, 2019, and June 7, 2019, Manafest published and premiered a new remix version of the songs "Renegade" and "No Plan B" respectively via YouTube. The remixes were both done by Doug Weier (also known as Unicron), the guitarist of We Are Leo. Chris Greenwood and Weier had worked together previously on the 2018 remix album Stones Reloaded.
