= Cut (music) =

In African American music, and in deejaying and turntablism, a cut "overtly insists on the repetitive nature of the music, by abruptly skipping it back to another beginning which we have already heard. Moreover, the greater the insistence on the pure beauty and value of repetition, the greater the awareness must also be that repetition takes place not on the level of musical development or progression, but on the purest tonal and timbric level".

David Brackett describes the cut, repetition on the level of the beat, ostinato, and the harmonic sequence, as what makes improvisation possible. In a cut repetition is not considered accumulation. "Progress in the sense of 'avoidance of repetition' would at once sabotage such an effort".

Brackett finds the cut in all African American folk and popular music "from ring to rap" and lists the blues (AAB), "Rhythm" changes in jazz, the AABA form of bebop, the ostinato vamps at the end of gospel songs allowing improvisation and a rise in energy, short ostinatos of funk which spread that intensity throughout the song, samples in rap, the last of which cuts on two levels, the repetition of the sample itself and its intertexual repetition.

The cuts of African American music are not to be confused with those of traditional Irish music, especially on the instrument of the tin whistle "Cuts and rolls" are used as a form of ornamentation in Irish traditional, and sometimes Scottish tunes.

== See also ==
- Beat juggling
