= ChristianRock.Net =

Internet only Christian rock radio station

- Website type: internet radio for Christian rock music
- Available in: English
- Website: christianrock.net
- Launched: 1998
- Current status: Active

ChristianRock.Net is an internet only Christian rock radio station based in Springfield, Missouri, United States. It started in 1998 and is listener-funded.

The site plays numerous singles from Christian rock artists, posting a weekly top 30 and an annual top 100. The site often features new albums, and has a database of all Christian radio singles by artists they play. They previously would announce concerts and put up lyrics from various songs.

The website plays rock music which can be streamed in multiple ways, including via a Web Browser, as an app on the App Store and Google Play, on Amazon Alexa devices, on Mac Music App or iTunes, and through other audio players. Users can create an account to request songs, but it is not required to listen. Other stations include ChristianHits.Net, ChristianPowerPraise.Net, ChristianClassicRock.Net, ChristianCountryGospel.Net, and ChristianHardRock.Net.

The site was named the best Internet Radio Network at the Fifth Annual American Christian Music Awards on October 15, 2005.
