= Wavorly =

American rock band

- Origin: Tupelo, Mississippi, U.S.
- Genres: Pop rock, alternative rock
- Years active: 2001–2012, 2016–present
- Labels: Sony BMG/Flicker
- Members: Dave Stovall; Matt Lott; Ryan Coon; Jaime Hays
- Past members: Teddy Boldt; Trey Hill; Dan Isbell; Seth Farmer
- Website: wavorly.bandcamp.com

Wavorly is an American rock band from Tupelo, Mississippi.

== History ==
Wavorly formed in 2001 under the name Freshmen 15 and independently released two albums under this name. The group changed its name after signing to Flicker Records because they "didn't want to be thirty years old and be like, 'I'm in "Freshmen 15". I have three kids.'" The name Wavorly comes from a haunted mansion in West Point, Mississippi. Their major label debut, Conquering the Fear of Flight, was released on Flicker on June 12, 2007, and has lyrics significantly influenced by the writings of C. S. Lewis.

The band's single "Part One" received significant airplay on US Christian radio and was heavily rotated on the Gospel Music Channel's Rock Block. Also, it had been confirmed that Wavorly was in the process of finishing their next album, which was slated for a 2011 release. Rob Graves, producer of Conquering the Fear of Flight and other bands such as RED and Pillar, was confirmed as producer. Former RED guitarist Jasen Rauch had also been confirmed as a co-producer. Wavorly released an EP entitled "The EP" On November 11, 2011.

Wavorly broke up on December 21, 2012, and made the announcement via Facebook.

Lead singer Dave Stovall joined forces with Christian rock band Audio Adrenaline in 2015.

Wavorly announced a reunion in 2017 via Facebook.

== Members ==
=== Current members ===
- Dave Stovall - lead vocals, rhythm guitar
- Matt Lott - bass
- Ryan Coon - keyboards
- Jaime Hays - drums

=== Former members ===
- Seth Farmer - vocals, lead guitar (2006-2018)
- Trey Hill - drums (2001–2006)
- Dan Isbell - guitar
- Teddy Boldt - drums (2010-2018)

== Discography ==
Freshmen 15

- Freshmen 15 (2002)
- Hi-5 Pedestrian (2004)

Wavorly

Albums:

- Conquering the Fear of Flight (Flicker Records, 2007)
- Something Like Fiction (independent, 2013)

Extended plays:

- The EP (independent, 2011)
- Silver Bells (independent, 2024)

Singles:

- "Movement One" (independent, 2017)
- "Strangers in Love" (independent, 2024)
- "Enemies" (independent, 2024)
