= Fan-funded music =

Fan-funded music is crowdfunding for music. Often, fan-funded music occurs in conjunction with direct-to-fan marketing. Fans of music have the option to donate and collectively raise money with the goal of jump-starting the career of a given musical artist. The fan-funding of music occurs primarily through web-based services using a business model for crowdfunding. Fans are typically given rewards based on their monetary contributions.

== Sites ==
Website	Year of Launch	Notes
ArtistShare	2000	First crowdfunding site for music
Indiegogo	2008	Disburses funds immediately
Kickstarter	2009	Takes 5% flat fee, Stripe takes additional 3-5%
Patreon	2013	Users can purchase a subscription to musicians/artists
PledgeMusic	2009	Can donate profits to charity. International.
RocketHub	2010	Takes 8% total funds accumulated. No screening process.
Sellaband	2006	Currency in €. Partners with SoundCloud.
Corite	2019	Distributes via digital music platforms

=== Further information ===
ArtistShare
ArtistShare is documented as being the first fan-funded website for music. The service lets musicians fund their projects utilizing a "fan-funding" model. In exchange for funding on a particular project, contributors receive various benefits. ArtistShare emphasizes on their website that for each project, the artist is not required to relinquish ownership of copyright, as this model is not a work made for hire.

Indiegogo
Indiegogo is a crowd funding portal that allows users to create a page for their funding campaign, set up an account with PayPal, make a list of "perks" for different levels of donation, then create a social media-based publicity effort. Users publicize the projects themselves through Facebook, Twitter and similar platforms. The site takes a 4% fee for successful campaigns. For campaigns that fail to raise their target amount, users have the option of either refunding all money to their contributors at no charge or keeping all money raised minus a 9% fee. Unlike similar sites such as Kickstarter, Indiegogo disburses the funds immediately, when the contributions are collected through the user's PayPal accounts. Indiegogo also offers direct credit card payment acceptance through their own portal. Those funds are disbursed up to two weeks after the conclusion of a campaign.

Kickstarter
Kickstarter is a crowd funding website that is used to fund films, games, music, art, designs, and technology. Project creators choose a deadline and a minimum goal of funds to raise. If the goal is not reached by the deadline, no funds are collected. The platform is available for donors from anywhere in the world and to creators in the US or the UK. Kickstarter takes a 5% fee and Amazon.com takes an additional 3%.

PledgeMusic
PledgeMusic was an international crowd funding platform geared specifically toward musicians. Users (pledgers) receive exclusive content in exchange for their contributions to artists fundraising campaigns. PledgeMusic does not retain any ownership or rights to any music created through the platform. Funding transactions occur only after a goal is successfully met. The site is staffed by people in the music industry and maintains partnerships with major players in the digital and physical music spheres allowing for numerous options to help record, produce, manufacture, market, and distribute artist's music, merchandise, and tickets. The site charges a 15% fee. PledgeMusic operates on two types of artist campaigns, direct-to-fan and pre-order campaigns. In a pre-order campaign, fans are charged immediately upon pledging. This type of campaign is designed for labels and artists who have already completed a recording, and are looking for a strategic way to pre-sell and market it.

RocketHub
RocketHub is a crowd funding platform open to anyone including musicians. Project holders on RocketHub have the option to keep raised proceeds even if the fundraising pledge was not successful. RocketHub is a completely open platform, meaning that anyone can create a fan-funding campaign and there is no screening process before the project goes live. The site takes an 8% commission from successful projects.

Sellaband
Sellaband was a crowd funding platform that allowed registered artists to use a direct-to-fan approach to finance albums or concerts. Artists will pledge an amount, the minimum funding target being €3000, and the maximum funding target, €250,000. Artists may also choose if they want to integrate a revenue sharing option into their funding. The minimum incentive is a download.

Corite
Corite collects five percent of the funding fee provided to an artist, and then another five percent of the royalties that are paid by streaming services. The company has raised $6.9m from investors.

== Cases of note ==
=== Marillion ===
The British rock band Marillion are considered to be one of the first artists to have used the Internet as a means of music distribution and direct contact with fans, which began with setting up a website in 1996 and raising $60,000 to help finance a 1997 North American tour. They have also been described by The Guardian music journalist Alexis Petridis as "the undisputed pioneers" of the fan-funded music model, beginning with the distribution of their 2001 release Anoraknophobia. Amidst a dissolving relationship with their record label and management team, the band calculated that they would need 5,000 fans to order the album to finance the project. However, they needed the money up-front, before the record was released. They turned to their mailing list and asked fans to pre-order the album in what was later described by the BBC as "a unique funding campaign". Pre-sales exceeded their 5,000-unit target, reaching about 12,000 pre-sales total. Marillion have since released several other albums based on a fan-funded model, receiving a £360,000 advance for their 15th studio album Happiness Is the Road.

=== Amanda Palmer ===
Unofficially dubbed the "queen" of Kickstarter, Amanda Palmer is an example of one of the most successful fan-funded music campaigns of all time. On 30 April 2012, Palmer ran a campaign on Kickstarter, with a goal of $100,000 to fund her newest studio album, Theatre Is Evil. By the end of May 2012, Palmer had amassed almost $1.2 million, ultimately receiving donations from nearly 25,000 individuals. By comparison, the average successful project on Kickstarter at the time raised about $5,000.

=== Ellis Paul ===
Boston-based singer/songwriter Ellis Paul is another important case study in the field of fan-funded music. His 2010 release, The Day After Everything Changed, was funded completely by fan donations. Instead of using a traditional crowd-funding platform, he adapted the online merchandise platform Nimbit to his own fan-funding scheme. Paul set up a tiered donation hierarchy, ranging from the $15 Street Busker level, up to the $10,000 Woody Guthrie level. Fans received different perks based on the tier at which they donated. The project proved to be highly successful, with total donations exceeding $100,000. Paul is putting his fan-funding to the test again; he is currently in the midst of fan-funding a new studio album set to release sometime in 2013.

=== Electric Eel Shock ===
Tokyo-based garage metal band Electric Eel Shock is another group that has seen some success in the way of fan-funded music. In 2004 they offered a "Samurai 100" package, which gave fans the opportunity to secure "guest list for life" status. The package cost £100 and the band raised £10,000 by selling 100 such packages.

== Criticism ==
Fan-funded music has gained popularity in the past few years however, money raised through these platforms still is only estimated to make up 1% of the amount spent on albums and tours. Many bands start off with fan funding to finance their initial album but then get signed to a record label. Major labels are signing artists with successful fan funded campaigns using the campaigns as a filter before investing in them. Other, more well-known bands have used fan funding to distance themselves from their label contracts and manage their own music. There has yet to be a band that has used fan funding to fully finance their career. In 2001, The Guardian journalist Gareth McLean was scathing of Marillion's pioneering efforts to continue their career without a label by dealing directly with their fans on the Internet, writing: "They have, they explained, decided to eschew the machinations of the record industry in order to be closer to the people. (One suspects that their decision occurred round about the time that the record industry decided to shun Marillion)."

AUTHOR OR PUBLICATION has argued that some artists overestimate the cost of recording an album in order to raise more money through fan-funding than they need. Advances in digital technology have made recording equipment smaller and cheaper, allowing some musicians to record albums at home rather than in a large studio.

Critics also point out that the fan-funded music model has turned bands into marketers and sales personnel. Artists must be able to develop personal marketing strategies in order to get the money to even begin working on their music. Artists must invest much time and effort into creating a campaign that engages their fans and gets them to donate to their project. This can prove difficult for any artist to create a campaign that does not come off as "[a] shrill and desperate-modern-day pan-handling by entitled go-getters." While fan-funded platforms are accessible for any musician, they have become over-crowded with both artists and anyone with an idea. "For every legitimately exciting pitch there are dozens of musicians, filmmakers and designers pleading for funds to complete ill-conceived projects."

After raising $1 million with her Kickstarter campaign, Amanda Palmer drew fire when she revealed that a portion of the money was spent on the campaign itself. This draws critics to question whether fan-funded music is actually more expensive than traditional label based production.

== See also ==
- Crowd funding
- Comparison of crowd funding services
- Direct-to-fan
- Freemium
- Free-to-play
- Kickstarter
- Open Music Model
