= Trevor McNevan =

Canadian musician

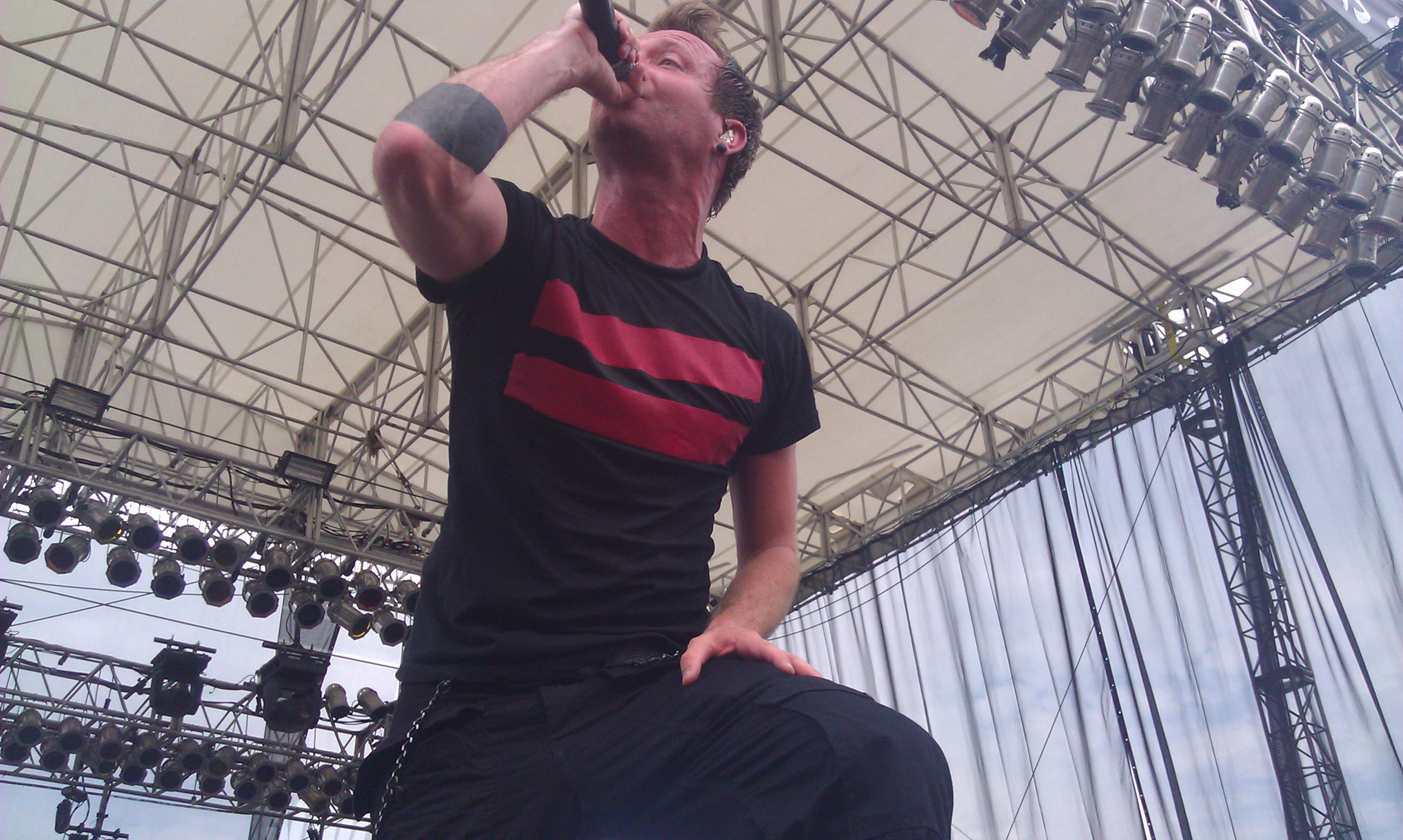
- McNevan with Thousand Foot Krutch at SoulFest 2011.

Background information
- Also known as: Teerawk
- Born: July 17, 1978 (age 48); Peterborough, Ontario, Canada
- Genres: Christian rock; hard rock; rap rock; hip hop; nu metal; alternative metal; pop-punk
- Occupations: Singer; songwriter; musician; rapper
- Instruments: Vocals; guitar
- Years active: 1995–present
- Label: Tooth & Nail
- Member of: Thousand Foot Krutch
- Formerly of: FM Static; Oddball

Trevor McNevan (born July 17, 1978) is a Canadian singer, songwriter, musician, and rapper. Best known as the frontman of Christian rock band Thousand Foot Krutch (TFK), he also leads side projects FM Static (pop-punk, with TFK drummer Steve Augustine) and I Am the Storm (hip hop).

His first band, Oddball (which morphed into TFK), was formed in Peterborough, Ontario, in 1995 and released their only record, Shutterbug, which featured 27 rock and hip-hop songs, the same year. The lineup consisted of Trevor's friends Dave Smith (guitar), Tim Baxter (bass), and Neil Sanderson (drums).

McNevan also co-produced the Thousand Foot Krutch album Welcome to the Masquerade and FM Static's album My Brain Says Stop, But My Heart Says Go!.

== Thousand Foot Krutch ==
McNevan is a founding member of Thousand Foot Krutch and is the only remaining original member, although the current line-up of the band has remained consistent since 2002. The band has released eight studio albums and two live CD/DVD albums. In 2017 the band entered an indefinite hiatus, although they have not officially disbanded. They later reunited in 2023.

In June 2015, Thousand Foot Krutch performed at the Faroe Islands Festival, conducted by Franklin Graham and run by the Billy Graham Evangelistic Association.

== FM Static ==
McNevan started the pop punk band FM Static with drummer Steve Augustine, Guitarist John Bunner and Bassist Justin Smith. The band has released four studio albums.

== I Am the Storm ==
Shortly after entering a hiatus with Thousand Foot Krutch, McNevan focused on a new project that returned him to his musical roots. McNevan announced his solo hip-hop project I Am the Storm in early 2018. After a successful campaign on crowdfunding site PledgeMusic, he released Fight Musik, Vol. 1 in mid-September of that year.

== Other work ==
McNevan co-wrote and co-produced Hawk Nelson's first album, Letters to the President and co-wrote their second, third, and fourth albums: Smile, It's The End of the World, Hawk Nelson Is My Friend, and Live Life Loud. He also co-wrote the song "Bring 'Em Out" with the band for the movie Yours, Mine and Ours, in which the band also performed. McNevan also starred in Hawk Nelson's "California" music video as the driver of the Jeep.

McNevan is primarily attributed with the discovery and promotion of Canadian Christian rapper Manafest. Since 2005, he has been a featured vocalist in the rapper's releases a total of nine times and frequently co-writes songs with Manafest for his projects.

McNevan has his own publishing company, "Teerawk Music", that houses his various songwriting, developing, and production ventures. Outside of TFK and FM Static, he has written songs for TobyMac, Hawk Nelson, Remedy Drive, Decyfer Down, Wavorly, Worth Dying For, Demon Hunter, KJ-52, Manafest, the Letter Black, Nine Lashes, Aliegh Baumhardt, and many others.

McNevan is a good friend of Nashville Predators NHL player Mike Fisher, and wrote a goal song for Fisher, only used at the Senators' home arena Scotiabank Place when Mike scores.

On September 10, 2025, McNevan announced that an upcoming album, The Sound of Awakening, to be released under the stage name Teerawk.

On September 11th, 2026- McNevan released the song "Walking Thru Fire"- featuring Christian Hip Hop artist TobyMac- as the end credits song for the 2026 Biblical drama film "Daniel and the Fiery Furnace".

== Guest appearances ==
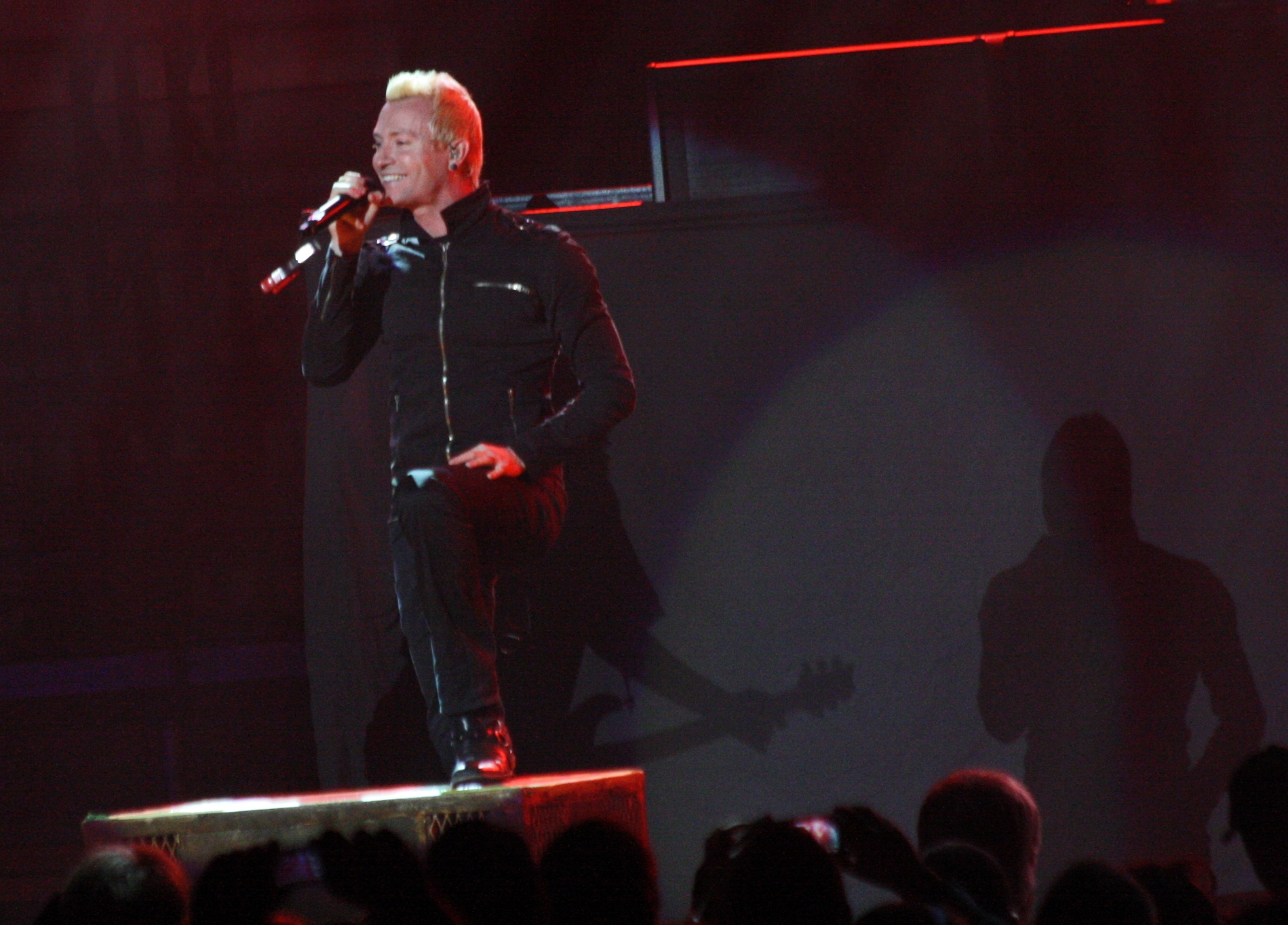
McNevan performing with Thousand Foot Krutch in 2011

Song(s)	Artist	Album	Year
"This Movie"	Three Days Grace	Demo	2000
"Rise Up"	KJ-52	Collaborations	2002
"Like a Racecar"	Hawk Nelson	Letters to the President	2004
"Coffin Builder"	Demon Hunter	Summer of Darkness	2004
"Skills"	Manafest	Epiphany	2005
"Impossible"	Manafest	Glory	2006
"Fearless (250 and Dark Stars)"	Falling Up	Exit Lights	2006
"Run For Cover"	KJ-52	KJ-52 Remixed	2006
"Ignition" (credited with guitar)	TobyMac	Portable Sounds	2007
"So Beautiful", "Kick It"	Manafest	Citizens Activ	2008
"Let's Go"	KJ-52	Five-Two Television	2009
"Fire in the Kitchen", "Every Time You Run", "Renegade"	Manafest	The Chase	2010
"Through Your Eyes"	Worth Dying For	Love Riot	2011
"Adrenaline"	Nine Lashes	World We View	2011
"Diamonds"	Manafest	The Moment	2014
"Electric"	Manic Drive	VIP	2014
"Shine On (Shine)"	Manafest	Reborn	2015
"Come Back Home"	Manafest	This Is Not the End	2019
"Like Poison"	Righteous Vendetta	Like Poison	2019
"Born For This"	The Letter Black	The Letter Black	2021
"Wait For Me"	From Ashes to New	Quarantine Chronicles Vol. 3	2021
"Gravity Falls"	Manafest	I Run with Wolves	2022
"Avalanche"	Sophie Lloyd	Imposter Syndrome	2023
"UNPARALYZED"	Caleb Hyles, Trevor McNevan,Thousand Foot Krutch and Judge & Jury	Darkness Before The Dawn	2024
"Euphoria"	Trevor McNevan, Thousand Foot Krutch and Judge & Jury	Non-album single	2024
"Cope"	Saliva, Trevor McNevan, Thousand Foot Krutch and Judge & Jury	Breaking Through	2026

from:
