= Kaveh Rastegar =

American jazz musician

- Born: November 17, 1975 (age 50); Montreal, Canada
- Occupations: Musician; bassist; producer
- Years active: 1994–present
- Website: kavehrastegar.com

Kaveh Rastegar is a Persian-American record producer, composer, and bass guitarist. He is best known for his work with John Legend, Sia, Bruno Mars, and Sting and Kneebody. He has two Grammy nominations.

For over twenty years, Kaveh Rastegar has been an integral part of a broad range of musical projects collaborating as a producer, songwriter, or a bass player. He is well known as the founding member of Grammy nominated group Kneebody and for many years. He's also been bassist with John Legend (appearing alongside him in the musical La La Land). He's recorded with artists such as Bruce Springsteen (also appearing in his 2019 film "Western Stars and on studio albums"), Ringo Starr, Shania Twain, and Beck and in films such as Daddy's Home, The Big Sick,The Joker: Folie a Deux, Spa Weekend, The Bubbleand Walk Hard. He also served as musical director with Sia, appearing with her on Saturday Night Live. As a songwriter he has written with artists such as Bruno Mars, De La Soul, Ciara, Cee-Lo Green, Meshell Ndegeocello and Kimbra. Rastegar has written, produced and released his own albums as an artist including "Light of Love" (2018) and "Haunted This Way" (2019). In 2020, Rastegar played bass alongside Sting in his musical The Last Ship. Rastegar also accompanied Sting for numerous concerts throughout the US with his Symphonicities project.

Rastegar co-wrote "Collide", a record by Tiana Major9 and Earthgang for the iconic film “Queen and Slim”. “Collide”, an uplifting anthem celebrating Black Love was nominated for a Grammy in the category for “Best R&B Song”. Rastegar has worked with Sabrina Claudio on projects including “Truth Is”, “No Rain No Flowers”, “Christmas Blues” with features by The Weeknd and Alicia Keys, and "Based On A Feeling". Rastegar is currently collaborating with a number of upcoming and established artists from his studio.

Kaveh is also bassist and member of the supergroup "World Famous Pets" along with singer songwriter Edie Brickell, drummer Matt Chamberlain and guitarist Mason Stoops. The group will release its debut album September 25, 2026 along with a number of concerts in the US including an appearance at Austin City Limits Festival in October.

== Early life and education ==
Rastegar was born in Montreal and grew up in Denver, Colorado. He is an alumnus of University of Rochester.

== Personal life ==
He is married and has three children.

== Discography ==
- 1997 – Emergency Broadcast Players Only a Test (LP) - Bass
- 1999 – Dispenza – Four Songs (EP) - Bass/Writer/Producer
- 2000 – Old Sol – EP - Bass
- 2002 – Wendel – Wendel - Bass/Writer
- 2002 – Dakah – Unfinished Symphony - Bass
- 2002 – Shane Endsley – 2nd Guess - Bass/Writer/Producer
- 2002 – Michael Andrews – Cypher soundtrack - Bass
- 2002 – Michael Andrews – Orange County soundtrack - Bass
- 2002 – Baba Alade – Unified and One - Bass
- 2003 – Dakah – Live at California Plaza 07/05/03 - Bass
- 2003 – Pan Dulce – Pan Dulce - Bass
- 2003 – Dj Haul e Mason – Cell: Eight - Bass
- 2003 – Arik Marshall – Fantaseality - Bass
- 2003 – Kneebody – Live Fall 2003 - Bass/Writer
- 2004 – Dakah – Live in Los Angeles 07/02/04 - Bass
- 2004 – Dakah – Live in San Francisco 07/31/04 - Bass
- 2004 – Thruster – Thruster! - Bass/Writer
- 2004 – Thruster – Live in Seattle 04/02/2004 - Bass/Writer
- 2004 – Casey Black – Vacations - Bass
- 2004 – Click Boom – The Freak Went Suite - Bass
- 2004 – Keven Brennan – God Is a Mighty Gourd - Bass
- 2004 – Keaton Simons – Currently (EP) - Bass
- 2004 – Michael Andrews – Wonderfalls soundtrack - Bass
- 2005 – Kneebody – Kneebody - Bass/Writer
- 2005 – Dj Haul – Half Baked Goods - Bass
- 2005 – Branden Harper – Tangents - Bass
- 2005 – Keaton Simons – Exes and Whys - Bass
- 2005 – Celeste Prince – Lady Sings - Bass
- 2005 – Christopher Wong – Journey from the Fall soundtrack - Bass
- 2005 – Uri Caine & Nate Wood – Shelf Life soundtrack - Bass
- 2006 – Kneebody – Live Volume One - Bass
- 2006 – Michael Hernandez – Anonyme - Bass
- 2006 – John Stowers – Everything You Do - Bass
- 2006 – Anna Dagmar – EP - Bass
- 2006 – Rosey – The Old Fashioned Way - Bass
- 2006 – Jurassic 5 – Feedback - Bass
- 2007 – Kneebody – Low Electrical Worker - Bass/Writer
- 2007 – Thruster – Green Heat - Bass/Writer
- 2007 – John Rogers – Satori - Bass
- 2007 – Tony Scott – A Jazz Life - Bass
- 2007 – Colin Hay – Are You Looking at Me? - Bass
- 2008 – Kneebody – Live Volume 2: Italy - Bass
- 2008 – Kneebody & Theo Bleckmann – 12 Songs by Charles Ives - Bass/Arranger
- 2008 – Chewy Puma – Macabre Cadabre - Bass/Vocals/Writer
- 2008 – Allensworth – Broken Leaves - Bass
- 2008 – Raya Yarbrough – Raya Yarbrough - Bass
- 2008 – The Ditty Bops – Summer Rains - Bass
- 2008 – Richard Stekol – The Point of Stars - Bass
- 2009 – Erica Mou – Bacio Ancora Le Ferite - Bass
- 2009 – Anna Dagmar – Let the Waves Come in Threes - Bass
- 2009 – Colin Hay – American Sunshine - Bass
- 2009 – Chali 2Na – Fish Outta Water - Bass
- 2009 – John Gold – A Flower in Your Head - Bass
- 2009 – Tony Monroe – Tony Monroe – EP - Bass
- 2009 – Jesca Hoop – Hunting My Dress - Bass
- 2009 – Luciano Ligabue – Sette notti in Arena - Bass
- 2010 – Bruno Mars – It's Better if You Don't Understand EP - Bass/Writer
- 2010 – Bruno Mars – Doo Wops and Hooligans - Bass/Writer
- 2010 – Kneebody – You Can Have Your Moment - Bass/Writer
- 2010 – CeeLo Green – The Ladykiller - Bass
- 2010 – Luciano Ligabue – Arrivederci, mostro! - Bass
- 2010 – Luciano Ligabue – Arrivederci, mostro! Tutte le facce del mostro - Bass
- 2011 – Giusy Ferreri – Il Mio Universo - Bass
- 2011 – Colin Hay – Gathering Mercury - Bass
- 2011 – Kelly Price – Kelly - Bass
- 2011 – Michelle Shaprow – Purple Skies - Bass
- 2011 – Timothy Young – Gravitational Lensing - Bass/Writer/Producer
- 2011 – Anthony Hamilton – Back to Love - Bass
- 2011 – Laura Pausini – Inedito - Bass
- 2011 – Luciano Ligabue – Campovolo 2.011 - Bass
- 2011 – Kneebody – Live Volume 3: Paris - Bass
- 2011 – Noemi – RossoNoemi - Bass
- 2012 – Kimbra – Vows - Bass
- 2012 – Thinking Plague – Decline and Fall - Bass
- 2012 – Sophie B. Hawkins – The Crossing - Bass
- 2012 – Matt Chamberlain – Company 23 - Bass
- 2012 – Curtis Stigers – Let's Go Out Tonight - Bass
- 2012 – Michael Lington – Pure - Bass
- 2013 – Nick Mancini – Storyteller - Bass
- 2013 – Cristiano De Andre – Come in Cielo Cosi in Guerra - Bass
- 2013 – Che Prasad – Shiva Me Timbers - Bass
- 2013 – Kelly Segal and Adam Levy – Little March - Bass
- 2013 – Kneebody – The Line - Bass/Writer
- 2013 – Matt Hires – The World Won't Last Forever, But Tonight We Can Pretend - Bass
- 2013 – Latryx – The Second Album - Bass/Guitar/Writer/Producer
- 2013 – Ligabue – Mondovisione - Bass
- 2014 – Meshell Ndegeocello – Comet Come to Me - Bass/Writer
- 2014 – Kimbra – The Golden Echo - Bass/Writer
- 2014 – Beck – Songreader - Bass
- 2014 – Rebecca Pidgeon – Bad Poetry - Bass
- 2014 – Minnie Driver – Ask Me To Dance - Bass
- 2015 – Charlie Puth ft. Meghan Trainor "Marvin Gaye" single - Bass
- 2015 – Flo Rida Ft. Fitz – "That's What I Like" single - Bass
- 2015 – Mikie Lee Prasad – Nowhere Special - Bass/Guitar/Keyboards/Writer/Producer
- 2015 – CeeLo Green – Heart Blanche - Bass/Writer
- 2015 – Kneebody + Daedelus – Kneedelus - Bass
- 2015 – John Legend – Under The Stars - Bass
- 2016 – Benji Hughes – Songs in the Key of Animals - Bass
- 2016 – De La Soul – And the Anonymous Nobody - Bass/Writer/Producer
- 2017 – Bob Reynolds – Guitar Band - Bass
- 2017 – Shania Twain – Now - Bass
- 2017 – Kneebody – Anti-Hero - Bass/Guitar/Writer
- 2017 – The Big Sick soundtrack - Bass
- 2017 – Ledisi – Let Love Rule - Bass
- 2018 – Kaveh Rastegar – Light of Love- Bass/Guitar/Keyboards/Vocals/Writer/Producer
- 2018 – Meshell Ndegeocello – Ventriloquism - Bass
- 2018 – Sabrina Claudio – "All to Me" single - Bass/Guitar/Keyboards/Writer/Producer
- 2018 – Sabrina Claudio – No Rain No Flowers- Bass/Guitar/Keyboards/Writer/Producer
- 2018 – Marc Lavoine – Je Reviens a Toi - Bass
- 2018 – Mel Parsons – Glass Heart- Bass
- 2018 – Elizabeth Goodfellow – Silly Sun- Bass
- 2018 – Simone White – Tiny Drop - Bass
- 2018 – Marsha Ambrosius – Nyla - Bass/Writer
- 2018 – Kneebody + Inara George – "How High" single - Bass/Guitar/Writer/Producer
- 2018 – Mike Love – "Reason For The Season" single - Bass
- 2019 – Ringo Starr – "What's My Name" - Bass
- 2019 – Bruce Springsteen – "Western Stars – Songs From The Film" - Bass
- 2019 – Sabrina Claudio – "Truth Is" - Bass/Guitar/Keyboards/Writer/Producer
- 2019 – Cinematic Orchestra – "To Believe" - Bass
- 2019 – The O'Jays – "The Last Word" - Bass
- 2019 – Kneebody – "By Fire" EP - Bass/Writer
- 2019 – Rebecca Pigeon – "Sudden Exposure to Therapy/Light" - Bass
- 2019 – Queen and Slim – "Motion Picture Soundtrack" - Bass/Writer
- 2019 – Tiana Major9 & Earthgang "Collide"- single - Bass/Writer
- 2019 – Dawn Richard – "New Breed" Bass/Guitar/Writer/Producer
- 2019 – Kneebody – "Chapters" - Bass/Writer
- 2019 – Ciara – "Beauty Marks" - Bass/Writer
- 2019 – Mike Love – 12 Sides of Summer - Bass
- 2019 – Kaveh Rastegar – "Haunted This Way" - Bass/Guitar/Keyboards/Vocals/Writer/Producer
- 2020 – Alain Clark – "Sunday Afternoon" - Bass
- 2020 – Becca Stevens – "Wonderbloom" - Bass/Writer
- 2020 – Adam Levy, Tamir Barzilay, Kaveh Rastegar – "California Special" - Bass
- 2020 – Tiana Major9 - "Think About You" single - Bass/Writer
- 2020 - Madeleine Peyroux - "American" single - Bass
- 2020 - Kai - "Fade Away" single - Bass/Guitar/Writer
- 2020 - Sabrina Claudio - "Christmas Blues" - Producer/Writer
- 2021 - Valerie June - "The Moon And Stars" - Bass
- 2021 - Ringo Starr - "Zoom In" EP - Bass
- 2021 - Manolo Ramos - "Amor y Punto" - Writer
- 2021 - Colin Hay - "I Just Don't Know What To Do With Myself" - Bass
- 2021 - Cynthia Erivo - "Ch.1 Vs.1" - Bass/Guitar/Writer/Producer
- 2022 - Rick Ross - "Richer Than Ever' - Writer
- 2022 - Gavin Haley - "Body Language' Single - Bass/Guitar/Keyboards/Writer/Producer
- 2022 - Gavin Haley - "I Hate You Don't Leave Me" - Bass/Guitar/Keyboards/Writer/Producer
- 2022 - Gaby Moreno - "Alegoria" Writer
- 2022 - John Legend - "Through The Night" Target Exclusive Single - Writer
- 2022 - Sabrina Claudio - "Based On A Feeling" - Bass/Guitar/Keyboards/Writer/Producer
- 2022 - Jex Nwalor - "Come Back" Single - Bass/Writer/Producer
- 2022 - Chris Pierce - "45 Jukebox" Single - Bass
- 2022 - Matt Nathanson - "Boston Accent" - Bass
- 2022 - Toni Romiti - "The Old Me" Single - Bass/Guitar/Writer/Producer
- 2022 - Rini - "Haunt Me" Single - Bass/Guitar/Keyboards/Writer/Producer
- 2023 - Nabate Isles - "En Motion" - Bass
- 2023 - Sabrina Claudio - "Archives And Lullabies" - Bass/Guitar/Writer/Producer
- 2023 - Larry Goldings, Kaveh Rastegar, Abe Rounds - "Better" - Bass/Guitar/Writer/Producer
- 2023 - Dorian Holley, Nayanna Holley - "I Can't Find My Way Home" Single - Bass/Producer
- 2023 - Rosemarie - "Rock, Paper, Scissors" EP - - Bass/Guitar/Keyboards/Writer/Producer
- 2023 - Keturah - "Kwanumkwanu" Single - Bass
- 2023 - Keturah - "All The Way From Africa" - Bass/Writer
- 2023 - Rum Gold - "Forget Me" Single - Writer
- 2023 - Njomza - "Stages" - Bass/Guitar/Producer/Writer
- 2023 - Percy Howard - "The Stars & The Well" - Bass
- 2023 - Sabrina Claudio - "Modo Avíon" Single - Bass/Guitar/Keyboards/Writer/Producer
- 2023 - Chris Pierce - "Home" Single - Bass/Writer
- 2023 - Travis Scott - "Utopia" - Bass
- 2023 - Téo - "Luna" - Bass/Writer
- 2023 - Chris Pierce - "Let All Who Will" - Bass/Writer
- 2023 - Nabate Isles - "En Motion" - Bass
- 2023 - Dorian Holley and Nayanna Holley - "DNA" - Producer, Arranger, Bass, additional guitar
- 2024 - Jose James - "Saturday Night (Need You Now)" Single - co Producer/co Writer
- 2024 - Nikka Costa - "Keep It High" Single - Bass/Guitars/co Producer/co Writer
- 2024 - Sonny Singh - "Pavan Guru" Single - Bass/Guitars/Keyboards/Harmonium/Producer/co Writer
- 2024 - Fana Hues - "Gone Again" - Bass/Guitars/Keyboards/Strings/Drum Programming/Producer/co Writer
- 2024 - Nikka Costa - "Dirty Disco" - Bass/Guitars/Keyboards/Strings/Drum Programming/co Producer/co Writer
- 2024 - Rini - "Your Ecstacy" - Bass/Guitars/Keyboards/Strings/Drum Programming/co Producer/co Writer
- 2024 - John Legend - "My Favorite Dream" - Bass
- 2024 - Sonny Singh - "Sage Warrior" - Bass/Guitars/Keyboards/Strings/Drum Programming/Executive Producer/co Writer
- 2024 - Joan As Policewoman - "Lemons, Limes and Orchids" - co Writer
- 2024 - Elaine - "Going Nowhere Slowly" - Bass/Guitars/Keyboards/Strings/Drum Programming/co Producer/co Writer
- 2024 - Jake and Abe - "Finally" - Bass
- 2024 - Shania Twain - "Shania: The Queen of Country Pop" - Bass
- 2024 - Sam Barsh Trio - "Old Tools New Rules" - Bass
- 2025 - Valerie June - "Joy, Joy" Single - Bass
- 2025 - Wafia - "Promised Land" - Bass/Guitars/Keyboards/Strings/Drum Programming/co Producer/co Writer
- 2025 - You're Cordially Invited - "Soundtrack" - Bass
- 2025 - Bruce Springsteen - "Tracks II: The Lost Albums" - Bass/Upright Bass
- 2025 - Valerie June - "Owls, Omens and Oracles" - Bass
- 2025 - Bruce Springsteen - "Lost and Found: Selections From the Lost Albums" - Bass/Upright Bass
- 2025 - Sabrina Claudio - "Fall In Love With Her" - Bass/Guitars/Keyboards/Strings/Drum Programming/co Producer/co Writer
- 2025 - Jose James - "1978: Revenge of the Dragon" - co-Writer, co-Producer
- 2025 - Leon Jean Marie - "This Must Be the Place (Naive Melody)" Single - Bass, Synth
- 2025 - Braxton cook - "All My Life" ft Marie Dahlstrom Single - Bass, Synth, Drums, Keyboards, Guitar, Producer/co Writer
- 2025 - Brandon Victor Dixon - "Hotel California" Single - Bass, Arranger, Co Producer
- 2025 - Scary Goldings - "the Holy Enchilada" Album - Bass, co-Writer
- 2025 - Brian Byrne - "She Must Go" Album - Bass
- 2025 - Säje and Jacob Collier - "In the Wee Small Hours of the Morning" Single - Cover Illustration
- 2025 - Christopher Stevens - "5am Dreams" Single - Bass
- 2025 - Holly Palmer - "Metamorphosis" - Bass
- 2025 - Max - "Track 01 for Aerse" ft Sabrina Claudio Single - Bass, Keyboards, Guitars, co-writer, co producer
- 2026 - Dery and Kaveh Rastegar - "Bury To Build" EP - Bass, Synth, Guitars, Drums, Piano, Percussion co-writer, Producer
- 2026 - World Famous Pets - "Maybe Somehow" Single - Bass co-writer, co-Producer
- 2026 - Tiny Habits - "Anything He Was" Single - Bass
- 2026 - Mark Isham - "At the Carousel Club" Single - Bass
- 2026 - World Famous Pets - "I Guess It's You" Single - Bass co-writer, co-Producer
- 2026 - Optic Nerve - "March" Single - Bass
- 2026 - Role Model - "Chuck Timely & the Hourglass" - on the song "Chasing Midnight" - Double Bass
- 2026 - Brandon Jenner - "Full Circle" on the songs "My Own Way", "Give Me A Reason" and "The Taking" - Bass
- 2026 - Lila Forde - "Fantasies" Single - Producer/Co-writer/Guitar/Bass/Percussion
- 2026 - Mark Isham - "Tales of the Street Piano" Single - Bass
