= Fiona Alpass =

New Zealand ageing researcher

Fiona Alpass ONZM
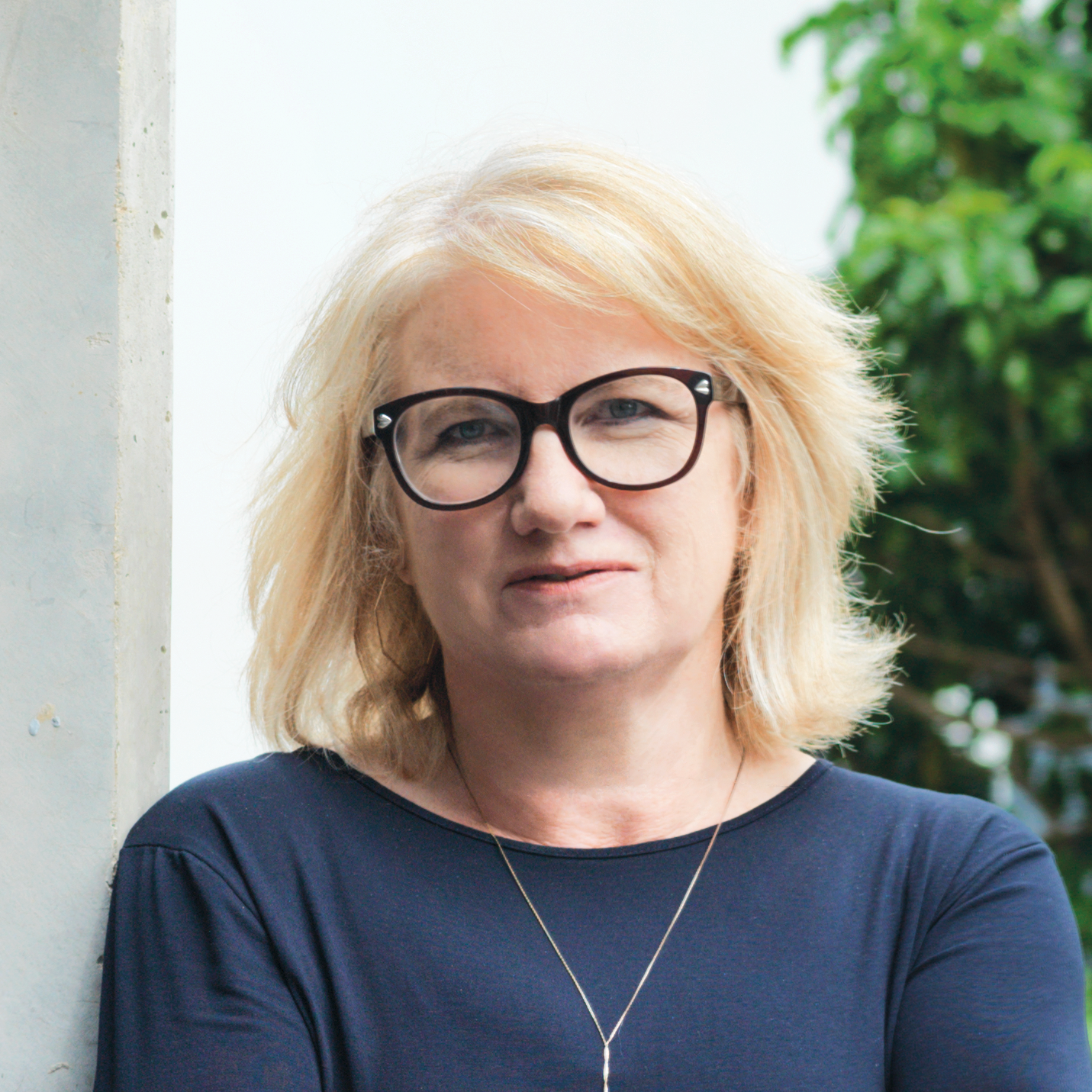
- Education: Massey University
- Scientific career
- Fields: gerontology
- Workplaces: Massey University
- Thesis: The effects of organisational change in the military : a comparison of work related perceptions and experiences in military and non-military environments (1994)
- Doctoral advisor: Nigel Long

Fiona Margaret Alpass ONZM is a New Zealand academic at Massey University.

== Academic career ==
Alpass completed a master's degree at Massey University in 1992, looking at how anger management and social contact can modulate the effects of alcohol and tobacco use. After a 1994 PhD titled The Effects of Organisational Change in the Military: A Comparison of Work Related Perceptions and Experiences in Military and Non-military Environments at Massey University, Alpass started working at Massey and rose to full professor in 2013.

Alpass has had a number of externally funded research projects, and a longitudinal ageing studying run jointly with Christine Stephens, also at Massey.

In the 2024 King’s Birthday Honours, Alpass was appointed an Officer of the New Zealand Order of Merit, for services to health psychology and seniors.

== Selected works ==
- Alpass, Fiona M., and Stephen Neville. "Loneliness, health and depression in older males." Aging & Mental Health 7, no. 3 (2003): 212–216.
- Stephens, Christine, Fiona Alpass, Andy Towers, and Brendan Stevenson. "The effects of types of social networks, perceived social support, and loneliness on the health of older people: Accounting for the social context." Journal of Aging and Health 23, no. 6 (2011): 887–911.
- Noone, Jack H., Christine Stephens, and Fiona M. Alpass. "Preretirement planning and well-being in later life: A prospective study." Research on Aging 31, no. 3 (2009): 295–317.
- Noone, Jack, Fiona Alpass, and Christine Stephens. "Do men and women differ in their retirement planning? Testing a theoretical model of gendered pathways to retirement preparation." Research on Aging 32, no. 6 (2010): 715–738.
- Alpass, Fiona, Andy Towers, Christine Stephens, Eljon Fitzgerald, Brendan Stevenson, and Judith Davey. "Independence, Well‐being, and Social Participation in an Aging Population." Annals of the New York Academy of Sciences 1114, no. 1 (2007): 241–250.
