= John Traphagan =

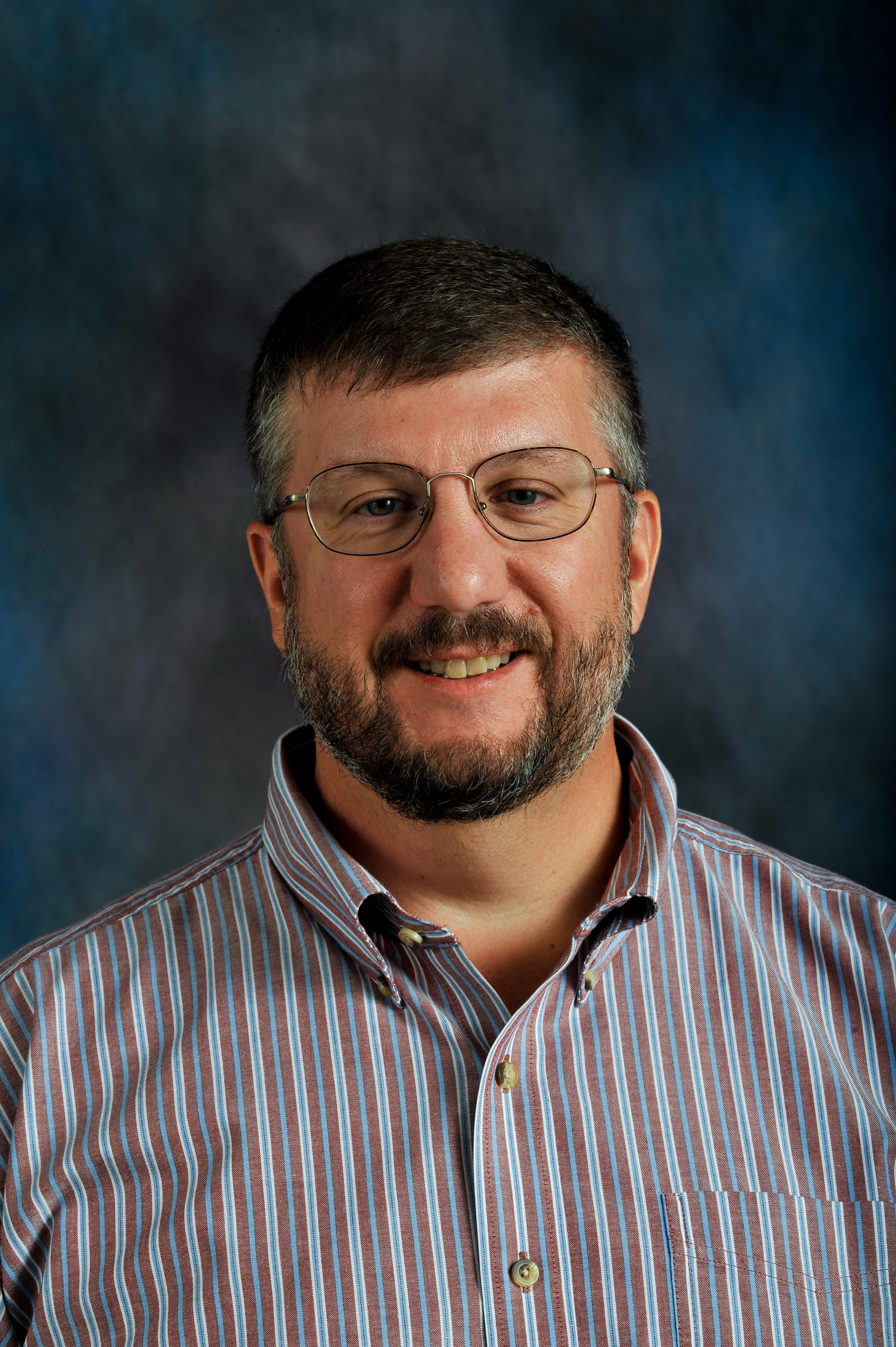
John Traphagan in 2010

John (Jack) Willis Traphagan is professor emeritus of Human Dimensions of Organizations and Anthropology at the University of Texas at Austin. He has held positions as a Visiting Scholar in the Interplanetary Initiative at Arizona State University, Visiting professor at the Center for International Education at Waseda University, Clark University, the University of Pennsylvania, and the University of Massachusetts Lowell. Traphagan's research has largely focused on rural Japan, with most of his research conducted in Iwate Prefecture. He has published extensively on science and culture, aging, health, and life in rural Japan. In the late 2000s, he developed a second stream of research focused on the culture and ethics of space exploration. He has made significant contributions in the study of risk associated with the search for extraterrestrial intelligence.

In 2010 he was elected Secretary General of the Japan Anthropology Workshop, the world's largest organization of anthropologists working on Japan, serving until 2014. Traphagan also serves on the Advisory Council of METI (Messaging Extraterrestrial Intelligence) International and the advisory board of the College of Fine Arts, Humanities, and Social Sciences at the University of Massachusetts Lowell.

== Early life and education ==
Traphagan was born on December 27, 1961, in Boston, Massachusetts, and grew up in the Boston area, attending public schools in Framingham and Chelmsford, where he graduated from Chelmsford High School. His father, Willis Traphagan, was professor emeritus of Music at the University of Massachusetts Lowell and his mother, Jeanne Elizabeth Long Traphagan, was a professional French Horn player and businesswoman.

Traphagan received his bachelor's degree in political science from the University of Massachusetts Lowell in 1983, his Masters of Arts in Religion and Social Ethics from Yale University in 1986, and his PhD in anthropology from the University of Pittsburgh in 1997.

== Career ==
Traphagan was an instructor at the University of Pittsburgh Department of Anthropology (1996); National Institute on Aging Postdoctoral Fellow University of Michigan (1997–1999); a research affiliate in the University of Michigan Population Studies Center (1999–2001); and an assistant professor of anthropology at California State University, Fullerton (1999–2001).

Traphagan has been a visiting research fellow at the University of Tokyo Institute of Oriental. Studies in 1995–1996; a visiting researching at Iwate University, Morioka, Japan, in 1998; and holds a position as visiting professor at Waseda University in Tokyo. In 1995–1996 he was a Fulbright Scholar to Japan.

From 2004 to 2007 he was Director of that Center for East Asian Studies at the University of Texas Austin. He has published over fifty scientific papers in journals such as Ethnology, Research on Aging, the International Journal of Astrobiology, Zygon: Journal of Religion and Science, Alzheimer Disease and Associated Disorder, Acta Astronautica, and the Journal of Anthropological Research.

== Other activities ==
Traphagan is a frequent presenter at national and international symposia on the subjects of Japanese culture, science and society, and aging and health care. He organized the 2000 Cultural Construction of Dementia Conference in Fullerton, California, the 2005 Association for Anthropology and Gerontology Annual Conference in Austin, Texas, and the 2010 Japan Anthropology Workshop 20th Conference in Austin, Texas. He was a co-organizer of the 2004 Japanese Families in a Global Age: Conflict and Change Conference in Pittsburgh.

In 2010 Traphagan was named Secretary General of the Japan Anthropology Workshop.

He is past president of the Association for Anthropology and Gerontology and past editor-in-chief of the Journal of Cross-Cultural Gerontology.

He has written many opinion pieces for publications such as The Diplomat, The Huffington Post, The Austin American Statesman, and Centauri Dreams. Traphagan is currently a host of the How To Be Wrong podcast channel on the New Books Network and drummer with the Botolph Jazz Trio.

== Selected bibliography ==
=== Books ===
- The Blood of Gutoku: A Jack Riddley Mystery in Japan. Balestier Press. 2021. ISBN 978-1-913891-08-4
- Embracing Uncertainty: Future Jazz, That 13th Century Buddhist Monk, and the Invention of Cultures. Sumeru Press. 2021. ISBN 978-1-896559-76-6.
- Science, Culture, and the Search for Life on Other Worlds. Springer. 2016. ISBN 978-3-319-41745-5.
- Extraterrestrial Intelligence and the Human Imagination: SETI at the Intersection of Science, Religion, and Culture. Springer. ISBN 978-3-319-10551-2.
- Rethinking Autonomy: A Critique of Principlism in Biomedical Ethics. Albany: State University of New York Press. 2013. ISBN 978-1438445526.
- Toward Sustainable Cities: Readings in the anthropology of urban environments. Leiden: Institute of Cultural and Social Studies, University of Leiden. 1998. ISBN 90-6624-101-2. (with P. Nas)
- Taming Oblivion: Aging bodies and the fear of senility in Japan. Albany: State University of New York Press. 2000. ISBN 0-7914-4499-6.
- Demographic Change and the Family in Japan's Aging Society. Albany: State University of New York Press. 2003. ISBN 0-7914-5649-8. (with John Knight)
- The Practice of Concern: Ritual, well-being, and aging in rural Japan. Durham: Carolina Academic Press. 2004. ISBN 0-89089-406-X.
- Wearing Cultural Styles in Japan: Concepts of tradition and modernity in practice. Albany: State University of New York Press. 2006. ISBN 0-7914-6697-3. (with Christopher S. Thompson)
- Imagined Families, Lived Families: Culture and kinship in contemporary Japan. Albany: State University of New York Press. 2008. ISBN 978-0-7914-7577-5. (with Akiko Hashimoto)
- Cosmopolitan Rurality, Depopulation, and Entrepreneurial Ecosystems in 21st Century Japan. Amherst, NY: Cambria Press. 2020. ISBN 9781621965022.
