= Christine Stephen =

Christine Stephen or Christina Stevens may refer to:

- Christine Stephen-Daly (born 1973), Australian actress
- Christine Stephens, New Zealand psychologist
- Christina Stevens (1825–1876), Dutch missionary

== See also ==
- Marie Christie Stevens, namesake of the U.S. Navy ship USS Stevens
- Christine Stevens (disambiguation)
- Chris Stevens (disambiguation)
- Steven Christian (disambiguation)
