= Chris Stevens =

Chris Stevens or Chris Stephens may refer to:

- Chris Stevens (rower) (born 1946), Australian Olympic rower
- Chris Stephens (cricketer) (born 1948), South African cricketer
- J. Christopher Stevens (1960–2012), assassinated U.S. Ambassador to Libya
- Chris Stevens (mathematician) (fl. 1970s–2010s), American mathematician
- Christine Stephens (fl. 1990s–2010s), New Zealand psychology academic
- Christopher Stevens (musician) (born 1967), American record producer and songwriter
- Chris Stephens (born 1973), Scottish National Party Member of Parliament for Glasgow South West
- Chris Stevens (Northern Exposure), a character in Northern Exposure
- Chris Stephens (rugby union) (born 1975), Welsh rugby union player

== See also ==
- Christopher Stevens (disambiguation)
- Christine Stephen (disambiguation)
