= Truth Is (album) =

Studio album by Sabrina Claudio
- Released: October 4, 2019
- Genre: Alternative R&B
- Length: 38:15
- Label: SC Entertainment
- Producers: Stephan Moccio; Govi; Sad Money; Michael Woods II

Sabrina Claudio chronology
About Time (2017)	Truth Is (2019)	Christmas Blues (2020)

Singles from Truth Is
- 1. "As Long as You're Asleep" Released: June 21, 2019; 2. "Holding the Gun" Released: July 31, 2019; 3. "On My Shoulders" Released: August 22, 2019; 4. "Truth Is" Released: September 19, 2019; 5. "Rumors" Released: October 4, 2019

Truth Is is the second studio album by American singer Sabrina Claudio. It was released on October 4, 2019, by SC Entertainment. It follows up Claudio's 2018 album No Rain, No Flowers.

== Background and singles ==
On June 21, 2019, "As Long As You're Asleep" was released as the lead single of the album. Claudio herself described the track as "one of my favs ever" and that she was "taking it back" to her roots with this song. The album's second single "Holding the Gun" was released on July 31, 2019 and was met favorable reviews. Jael Goldfine of Paper praised Claudio's performance on the song, saying that it "hinges on her angelic, liquid velvet voice, which stretches out across atmospheric strings and a syrupy pulsating beat". With the track, Claudio "wanted to make sure that showing violence was not a factor within the visual as violence, conceptually, isn’t what the song is about" and that it instead "represents the lengths one would go when so deeply in love". Rania Aniftos at Billboard described the song as "is a seductive R&B tune about infinite devotion". On September 19, 2019, the singer officially announced the album title and its release date. The announcement was accompanied by the release of album's title track. On the meaning of the song, Claudio elaborates that it "is about emotions we often think of but are afraid to voice – the feelings we try to convince ourselves we don't actually feel".

== Promotion ==
To promote the album, Claudio embarks on the "Truth Is Tour" across North America and Europe with special guest Gallant.

== Track listing ==
Track listing and credits adapted from Apple Music and Tidal.

Truth Is track listing
No.	Title	Writer(s)	Producer(s)	Length
1.	"Take One to the Head"	Sabrina Claudio; Ajay Bhattacharyya; Mikhail Beltran	Stint; Sad Money	3:46
2.	"Truth Is"	Claudio; Julia Michaels; Kaveh Rastegar; Stephan Moccio	Moccio	3:32
3.	"Rumors" (featuring Zayn)	Claudio; Nolan Lambroza; Nasri Atweh; Zayn Malik	Sir Nolan; Sad Money	3:46
4.	"Hurt People"	Claudio; Beltran; Rastegar; Michael Woods II	Woods; Sad Money	3:51
5.	"On My Shoulders"	Claudio; Rastegar; Beltran; Nile Goveia	Govi; Sad Money	3:37
6.	"Me in Her"	Claudio; Rastegar; Woods II; Beltran	Woods; Sad Money	3:06
7.	"I Don't Mean To"	Claudio; Beltran; Lisa Scinta; Derek Gamlam	Blue Rondo; Sad Money	3:21
8.	"As Long as You're Asleep"	Claudio; Jessica Karpov; Woods II; Beltran	Woods; Sad Money	2:42
9.	"Problem with You"	Claudio; Bhattacharyya; Simon Wilcox; Rastegar; Beltran	Sad Money; Stint	3:35
10.	"Holding the Gun"	Claudio; Alain Chamfort; Woods; Beltran; Roda Gil Etienne	Woods; Sad Money	3:08
11.	"Truth Is" (Spanish version)	Claudio; Michaels; Rastegar; Moccio; Luis Figueroa	Moccio	3:45
Total length:				38:15
