= Christmas Blues (album) =

Studio album by Sabrina Claudio
- Released: November 27, 2020
- Length: 25:48
- Labels: SC Entertainment; Atlantic

Sabrina Claudio chronology
Truth Is (2019)	Christmas Blues (2020)	Based on a Feeling (2022)

Singles from Christmas Blues
- 1. "Warm December" Released: November 20, 2020

Christmas Blues is the third studio album and first Christmas-themed album by American singer Sabrina Claudio. It was released on November 27, 2020, through SC Entertainment and Atlantic and includes various original songs, as well as three cover songs. The album features guest appearances by the Weeknd and Alicia Keys.

== Background ==
About works on the album, Claudio revealed that "we really had no idea where we'd end up...we were just creating because it felt good". The album was created in summer 2020 and was put together with the intention "to bring a "sense of peace"". The singer exclusively worked with singer-songwriter Nasri Atweh and producer Kaveh Rastegar on the album. She described the work with the former as "easy because I was with him". According to Claudio, the goal is "to put people in their feelings". The album was preceded by the single "Warm December" which was released on November 20, 2020. The song was described as "closer to her brand of R&B, with an even more intimate and torchy vibe".

== Critical reception ==
Trishna Rikhy of V thought the album was "a culmination of the holiday spirit—festivity, cheers, love and merriment—in Claudio’s signature sultry, evocative sound. Kartlon Jahmal at HowNewHipHop highlighted the appearance of the Weeknd and Alicia Keys, "who both steal the song on their respective tracks".

== Track listing ==
Christmas Blues track listing
No.	Title	Writer(s)	Length
1.	"I Just Melt"	Kaveh Rastegar; Mikhail Beltrain; Nasri Atweh; Sabrina Claudio	2:45
2.	"The Christmas Song"	Robert Wells; Mel Tormé	2:42
3.	"Christmas Blues" (with the Weeknd)	Rastegar; Abel Tesfaye; Beltrain; Atweh; Claudio	3:25
4.	"Oh Holy Night"	Adolphe Adam	3:19
5.	"Winter Time" (with Alicia Keys)	Alicia Keys; Rastegar; Atweh; Claudio	3:02
6.	"Have Yourself a Merry Little Christmas"	Ralph Blane	3:54
7.	"Short Red Silk Lingerie"	Rastegar; Atweh; Claudio	3:25
8.	"Warm December"	Adam Messinger; Atweh; Claudio	3:16
Total length:			25:48
