= Edison and Leo =

- Directed by: Neil Burns
- Screenplay by: Daegan Fryklind; George Toles
- Story by: George Toles
- Produced by: Dean English; Karen Powell; David Valleau
- Starring: Powers Boothe; Gregory Smith; Carly Pope
- Cinematography: Brian Johnson
- Edited by: Joseph Fitzpatrick
- Music by: Michael Richard Plowman
- Production company: Perfect Circle Productions
- Distributed by: TVA Films
- Release date: September 4, 2008 (Toronto International Film Festival)
- Running time: 79 minutes
- Country: Canada
- Languages: English; French

Edison and Leo is a 2008 stop-motion animated feature film produced by Perfect Circle Production and Infinity Entertainment.

== Plot ==
George T. Edison (Boothe) is an oddball inventor who hears with his teeth instead of his ears as a result of a bizarre childhood train accident. By day he toils away in his cluttered laboratory, and by night he listens to phonograph records by chewing on the giant metal horn that conducts the sound. At his home at Pickerton Park, He works with his companion, Batchelor (McNeil), to find many ideas for inventions. He lives happily with his father, Captain Samuel Edison, his wife, Lotte Edison, and his two sons, Leo and Faraday Edison.

One day, George invites a married foreign couple to have a look at his ancient artifacts. He introduces them by using a phonograph that plays the melodious voice of his wife. George, the womanizer he is, falls in love with the veiled foreign lady and likes her exotic dance. At night, George was talking with the foreigners about his collection of sacred treasures. One of the treasures was called a poisonous weapon called the Viper Knife. The knife was used to cut a woman's bottom lip to tell if she has been cheating on her husband. If it bleeds, then she was cheating. The married couple decides to leave, but the lady gives George a note that says to "Meet Here At Midnight" (kiss). Meanwhile in Leo's room, Leo and Faraday were arguing about their father's inventions. Lotte (Terzo) comes in the room and orders Faraday to return to his room. Lotte tells a bedtime story to Leo while Faraday overhears them.

Many situations had happened immediately after the visit from the married foreign couple. Samuel Edison (Brazeau), Leo's courageous grandfather, visits Leo and tells many stories about his adventures with monsters. Leo eventually falls asleep and his grandpa leaves. Lotte decides to clean many furniture around the house and gets her bed ready. However, a mysterious person has ambushed her. Meanwhile, George sets up an alarm for midnight and places the note next to it. He decided to use his zoetrope to pass the time. He picks out a set of pictures and places them in order. Using his hand, he spun the wheel once and it showed a revealing belly dancer. By using his teeth, he was able to hear the instrument playing while watching the belly dancer move. The belly dancer's gyrating caused George to hallucinate. The sexy belly dancer approaches him with lustful eyes. George was about to give in until the alarm set off. He was ready to meet the lady.

George goes to his ancient artifact collection and sees a lifeless body that looked like the foreign lady. He sees a note that talks about the Viper Knife. George panics and cuts off the lips with the knife. It was not until he realizes that the dead body was his own wife. Meanwhile, the married couple has achieved the knife and left the residency. The couple were fakes. The lady, Toni, and her daughter, Zella, demanded money for their work. The man betrays them and throws them off the railroad tracks. Angered, Toni (Samuda) wanted revenge on the Edisons. After finding Bachelor, George takes Lotta's body to the Pasannas, a primitive Amazoness tribe that uses magic and spells that is sourced from the sacred Book Of Light, a book full of creative ideas. The old chief partially restores Lotte and orders George to rest her next to the Book Of Light. Full of greed, George steals the treasure and escapes with Bachelor and Lotte back to their home. The Pasannas chase after them, however, an electric fence blocks their entry. Using the book, George had the idea to use an electric tower to fully restore his wife. However, Lotte goes berserk and almost kills Bachelor and George. Leo becomes worried and goes out of his window. Leo comes out and his mother comes back to her senses. Happily reunited, they hold hands and a lightning bolt shocks them. The shock killed Lotte and made Leo unconscious. After the Pasannas failed, they accepted Toni and Zella into their tribe. George is sure that his latest invention is the one that will cement him as a true genius. Eager to get the ball rolling, George hastily recruits his unconscious son Leo to assist in his latest experiment without considering the consequences. As the experiment gets underway, however, something goes horribly awry and Leo is electrified. Now Leo is unable to touch another human without fear of delivering a deadly jolt. At Leo's birthday, Edison lies to Leo about his mother's death and gave him robotic friends. Leo becomes annoyed and goes to a statue of his mother to relieve himself. Faraday becomes angry that he cannot be a soldier and fight the Pasannas.

After a timeskip, everyone grew older. Leo (Smith) becomes lonely at his school until the lovely Zella (Pope) zaps into his life. Zella is the first person with the power to see past Leo's electrified façade, and as such she may just be his ticket to true happiness. Meanwhile, George was having an affair with Toni and she was disguised as a seamstress. Toni wants George to tell his secrets, but he refuses. After Toni leaves, George sees that Leo falls in love with Zella. George thinks of a plan to subdue Leo's sexual desires. Using George's newly-invented kinetoscope, Leo was able to view a belly dancer move. George believes Leo would find her dance quite exquisite. George explains that he can do experimentations on Leo to remove the vision of enticing lures and features from females. He strips away the attractive belly dancer until she becomes only a skeleton. Leo, disgusted, refuses and thought the experiment would be horrible. Samuel Edison agrees and believes you cannot take a man's pride. Faraday (Cotton) still argues with George and believes that he can fight him. George easily defeats his son and his son decides to leave.

Toni sees Faraday leaving and has a plan to get revenge on George. She persuades him to get secrets about the fuse box to disable the electric fence. Faraday agrees with the plan. Meanwhile, Leo decides to go with Zella to find out about his mother's death. With the help of Leo's electric superpowers, they were able to arrive at the Pasannas efficiently. The elder chief gives the true backstory about his mom's death. Going back to home, Leo and Zella puts on a movie about Lotte's true death. George comments that it was not true and falls in love with Zella. An enraged Leo decides that he wants to abandon his life at the Edisons. Zella comes over to meet with Leo's father in which he happily accepts. After seeing Leo and Edison's soldiers leave for the sauna, Faraday bakes a pie drugged with sleeping liquid. George attempts to pursue Zella and she luckily escapes. Faraday gives George the pie and George at the whole pie. George becomes tired and goes to his bedroom. Faraday asks George about the fuse box and George still refuses. Faraday becomes angry and decides to try to cut down the electricity by himself. The fuse box was next to George's bedroom. After forgetting something, Leo goes back to his room and goes up to see mother's statue. He sees Faraday trying to find the fuse box and argues with him. Leo leaves and becomes so enraged that he was able to control his electric powers.

Zella goes out to find her mother and learns the whole truth about trying to kill the Edisons for good. Zella panics and tries to find Leo. Faraday decides to go down to his father's lab and uses a wrench to jam the power supply. It works and the power goes out. The Pasannas see the power goes out and pursues to save their treasure. The Pasannas took down Batchelor and the soldiers at the sauna. A disgusted Leo sees this and was concerned for the safety of Zella. He immediately goes back to his home. Samuel Edison and his men try to fight the Pasannas, but without vision they were killed off. Leo finds George at his lab and sees that George has gone insane. Zella sees Leo and warns Leo to be careful fighting his father. Faraday sees his dying grandfather and takes his sword to become a fighter. Leo was about to kill his father until Faraday arrives and beheads him. George's head tells Faraday that he was proud and immediately dies. Toni decides to bring the head back to the tribe. The elder chief takes back the Book Of Light and regains her powers. The statue of Leo's mom talks to Leo and Leo was happy to hear her mother's voice. Even though George was killed, the teenagers were shocked to find out that there was another George. However, this George was a robot and took the memories that lead up to his own death. Faraday screams and George decides that he will try to find inventions to save humanity. Leo and Zella choose to go west and live their own lives together.

== Voice cast ==
- Powers Boothe as George T. Edison
- Gregory Smith as Leonardo "Leo" Edison
  - Quinn Lord as Young Leo
- Carly Pope as Zella
  - Claire Renaud as Young Zella
- Jay Brazeau as Captain Samuel Edison
- Scott McNeil as Batchelor
- Jacqueline Samuda as Toni and Nirena
- Ben Cotton as Faraday Edison
  - Aiden Drummond as Young Faraday
- Venus Terzo as Lotte Edison
- Carmen Moore as Ute
- Ashley Michaels as Helka
- Brian Drummond as Braken-Carl
- Ashleigh Ball as Robot Children
- Colin Murdock as Gokul

== Production ==
It is one of the first stop-motion feature films to not target the family audience, and is being distributed in Canada by TVA Film. Technical director Jean-Luc Dinsdale used Automatic Duck to arrange the film.

=== Premier ===
The film's world premier was on September 4, 2008, as the Opening Film of the Canada First section at the Toronto International Film Festival. Toronto International Film Festival Programmer Jesse Wente said about it: "The animation is so gorgeous it almost made me vomit - in a good way - when you see the scene you’ll know what I mean" .

== See also ==
- List of stop-motion films
