= Jaws =

Jaws or Jaw may refer to:

== Anatomy ==
- Jaw, an opposable articulated structure at the entrance of the mouth
  - Mandible, the lower jaw

== Arts, entertainment, and media ==
=== Films ===
- Jaws (franchise)
  - Jaws (film), a 1975 American film directed by Steven Spielberg based on the novel by Peter Benchley
  - Jaws 2, a 1978 American film
  - Jaws 3-D, a 1983 American film
  - Jaws: The Revenge, a 1987 American film

=== Other uses in arts, entertainment, and media ===
- Jaws (James Bond), a character in The Spy Who Loved Me and Moonraker
- Jaws (novel), by Peter Benchley and the basis of the 1975 film
- Jaws (ride), a theme park attraction based on the 1975 film series
- Jaws (video game), a 1987 NES video game, based on the 1975 film franchise
- Shark Jaws, a 1975 arcade game made by Atari
- "Jaws", The Keith & Paddy Picture Show season 1, episode 4 (2017)

=== Music ===
- Jaws (soundtrack)
- Jaws (album), 1958, by Eddie "Lockjaw" Davis
- Jaws (band), an English surf pop/alternative rock band from Birmingham
- "Jaws", a song by BAE173 from Intersection: Blaze
- "Jaws", a song by Lights from Pep
- "Jaws", a song by Lemon Demon from the EP Nature Tapes

== People ==
- Jaw (Ćehu′pa) (c. 1850–1924), Hunkpapa Lakota winter count keeper and ledger art artist
- Jaw Shaw-kong, Taiwanese media personality and politician
- Aaron Homoki, American professional skateboarder
- Ron Jaworski, American football quarterback
- Joe Jordan, Scottish footballer and coach
- Colin Lloyd, English darts player
- Darrell Waltrip, American race car driver

== Computing ==
- JAWS (screen reader), for blind and vision-impaired computer users
- JAWS Scripting Language, a proprietary programming language
- Java Web Start or JAWS, a system for launching Java applications outside of a web browser

== Other uses ==
- Jaws (beach), a big-wave surfing area in Hawaii
- Japan Anthropology Workshop, abbreviated JAWS
- Jaffe Wins Above Replacement Score (JAWS), a sabermetric tool for evaluating a baseball player's Hall of Fame worthiness

== See also ==
- Grab (tool), a pair of mechanical jaws
- Hydraulic rescue tool, of which one brand is known as the "Jaws of Life"
- Open-jaw ticket, an airline return ticket whose destination and origin differ
- JAAW, rock music group
