= Charles Emlet =

American social work scholar

Charles A. Emlet
- Occupation: Social work scholar
- Awards: Fellow, American Academy of Social Work and Social Welfare (2020); Fellow, Gerontological Society of America; Fulbright Scholar (2013)

Academic background
- Education: California State University, Fresno; Case Western Reserve University
- Thesis: Service utilization among older adults living with HIV/AIDS (1998)

Academic work
- Discipline: Social work
- Sub-discipline: Gerontology, HIV/AIDS and aging
- Institutions: University of Washington Tacoma
- Main interests: HIV/AIDS and aging, LGBT aging, stigma and ageism, resilience, dementia-related interventions
- Notable works: HIV/AIDS and Older Adults: Challenges for Individuals, Families and Communities (2004)

Charles A. Emlet is an American social work scholar and Professor Emeritus of Social Work at the University of Washington. His research focuses on aging, HIV/AIDS, and LGBT older adults.

== Early life and education ==
Emlet was raised on a family farm near Fresno, California. He earned a Bachelor of Arts and a Master of Social work from California State University, Fresno, in 1975 and 1979, respectively. He later completed a Ph.D. in Social Welfare at Case Western Reserve University in 1998, with a dissertation examining service utilization among older adults living with HIV/AIDS.

== Academic career ==
Emlet joined the University of Washington Tacoma in 1999, where he served as assistant professor, associate professor, and full professor of social work until his retirement in 2022. He holds the title of professor emeritus and has maintained adjunct affiliations with the University of Washington School of Social Work and the University of Washington Center for AIDS Research.

He was a Fulbright Visiting Research Chair at McMaster University in 2013 and has also held a visiting professorship at the University of Toronto's Factor-Inwentash Faculty of Social Work.

== Research ==
Emlet's scholarship addresses aging with HIV/AIDS, LGBT aging, stigma and ageism, resilience, and dementia-related interventions. He has contributed to national and interdisciplinary research projects, including the National Health, Aging, and Sexuality/Gender Study (NHAS) and the Innovations in Dementia Empowerment and Action (IDEA) study.

He has authored or co-authored more than 80 peer-reviewed journal articles and book chapters. His work has appeared in journals such as The Gerontologist and Journal of Aging and Health, and he has served on editorial boards for journals including The Gerontologist and the Journal of HIV/AIDS and Social Services.

== Honors and affiliations ==
- Fellow, American Academy of Social Work and Social Welfare (2020)
- Fellow, Gerontological Society of America

== Selected publications ==
- Emlet, Charles A. (2004). HIV/AIDS and Older Adults: Challenges for Individuals, Families and Communities. Springer.
- Emlet, Charles A.; Crabtree, Janet L.; Condon, Valerie (2007). In Home Assessment of Older Adults: An Interdisciplinary Approach (2nd ed.). Pro-Ed.
- Emlet, Charles A. (2006). ""You're awfully old to have this disease": Experiences of stigma and ageism in adults 50 years and older living with HIV/AIDS". The Gerontologist. 46 (6): 781–790. doi:10.1093/geront/46.6.781. PMID 17169933.
- Emlet, Charles A.; Harris, Laura (2018). "Giving Back Is Receiving: The Role of Generativity in Successful Aging Among HIV-Positive Older Adults". Journal of Aging and Health.
