= Hayley Gene Penner =

Canadian singer-songwriter and author (born 1985)

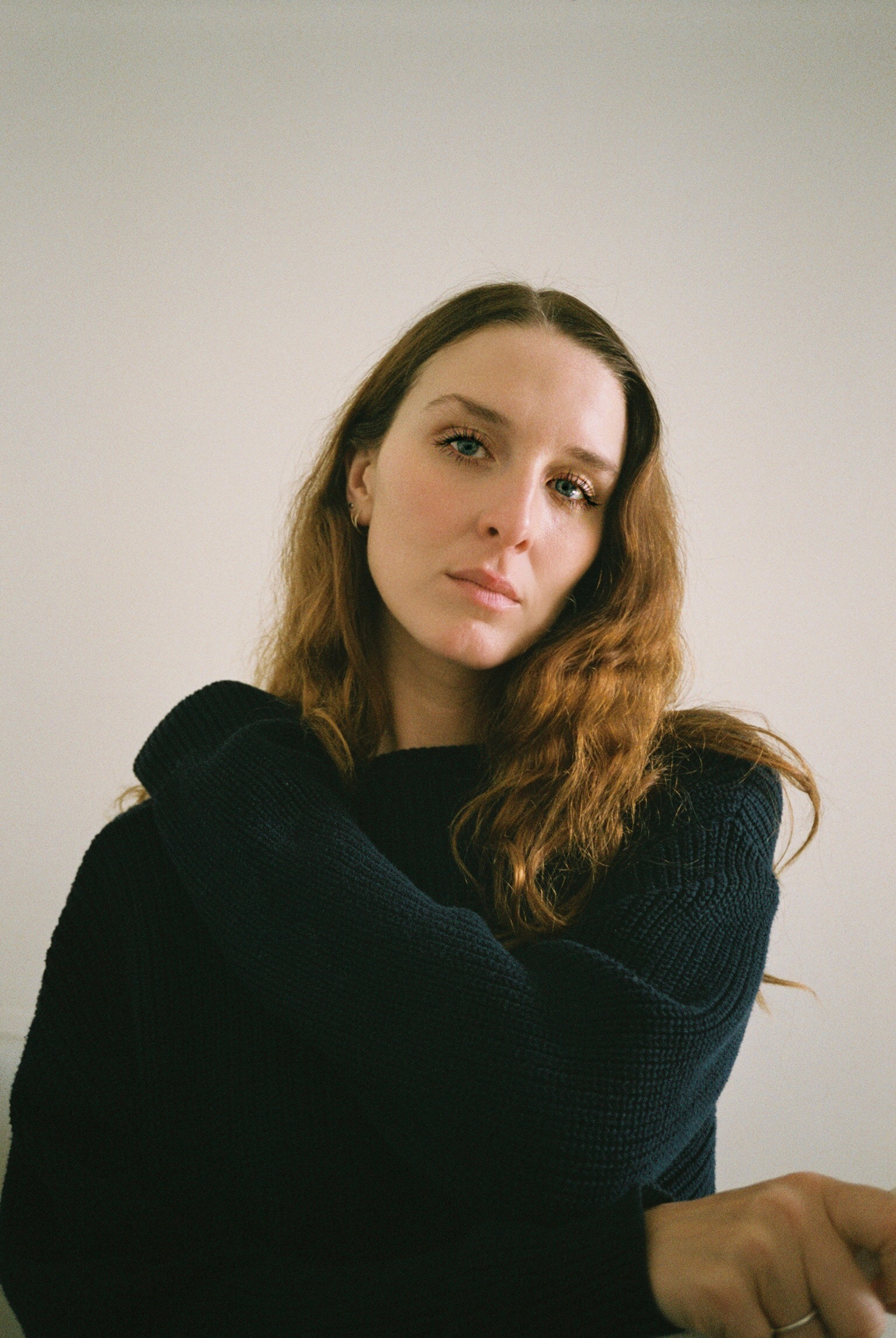

Background information
- Born: November 5, 1985 (age 40); Winnipeg, Manitoba, Canada
- Genres: Pop and folk
- Occupations: singer; songwriter; instrumentalist; author
- Instruments: guitar; piano
- Years active: 2003–present
- Website: https://www.hayleygpenner.com/

Hayley Gene Penner (born November 5, 1985) is a Canadian singer, songwriter and author based in Los Angeles. She has written for artists including the Chicks, Sabrina Claudio, Lennon Stella, Charlotte Lawrence and The Chainsmokers. Penner began releasing music under her full name in 2018. In September 2020, she released her debut album, People You Follow, with a memoir of the same name.

== Early life and education ==
Penner was born and raised in Winnipeg, Canada, the eldest daughter of Canadian children's music performer Fred Penner and Odette Heyn, a choreographer and founder of a contemporary dance school.

At age 17, Penner was hosting CBC children's programming and lending her voice to commercials for companies like Cheez Whiz, McDonald's, Kraft Dinner and Hamburger Helper. She was the Manitoba regional host for Kids' CBC from 2003 to 2005.

Penner moved to Toronto, where she studied journalism at Toronto Metropolitan University and formed the electronic dance band TuZO with a friend. After university, Penner worked at Châtelaine before spending six months writing restaurant reviews for a magazine in London.

== Music career ==
=== Songwriting ===
Penner moved to Los Angeles in 2011 to sign a publishing deal with BMG Chrysalis and the Messengers. Penner writes for other artists, including 11 songs with Sabrina Claudio across her first two projects Confidently Lost and About Time, 7 with Alina Baraz, and other artists such as Lennon Stella, Charlotte Lawrence, and Sinead Harnett. Hayley wrote "Everybody Loves You" on The Chicks' 2020 return album, Gaslighter.

Penner's songwriting partnership with Charlotte Lawrence continued with her joining Lawrence on tour and as an opening act at New York's Bowery Ballroom and Los Angeles's The Troubadour.

=== Solo career ===
In 2011, Penner signed with Universal Music Canada and began releasing and writing music under the name W. Darling. Penner released two EPs comprising three songs each in 2015, The Lost Girls Chapter One and Chapter Two.

In 2017, Penner split from Universal Music Canada and began releasing music through AWAL under her full name Hayley Gene Penner, moving away from the electronic pop returning to her roots as an acoustic, folk singer-songwriter. Penner released five singles in 2018, two in 2019, and five in 2020. A memoir, People You Follow, was scheduled for release in late 2020.

== Memoir ==
Alongside her debut album, Penner wrote a memoir, also titled People You Follow, about her experience as a female songwriter in the music industry and the hidden, toxic side of the business. The book, released in fall 2020, was described by Lena Dunham as "a fucked up Alice in Wonderland journey down the rabbit hole of LA's most subtly toxic industry, and it's also funny. brilliant, coy, playful and wise." Cindy Crawford called the book "both heartbreaking and humorous" depiction "of how we, as women, struggle to find our value through the eyes of others".

== Discography ==
=== Albums ===
- People You Follow (2020)

=== Songs ===
Title	Year
"Olive Juice"	2018
"Sleep at Night"	2018
"White Stripes"	2018
"Smaller"	2018
"Talking to Myself"	2018
"Silver Lining"	2019
"Two Birthdays and One Bad Christmas"	2019
"somethingyouneverhad"	2020
"The Longer It Hurts"	2020
"Great Advice"	2020
"Alone Together"	2020
"Until I'm Back to You"	n/a

=== Songwriting credits ===
Year	Artist	Album	Song
2012	Cody Simpson	Paradise	"Paradise"
2013	Victoria Justice	Single	"Shake"
2014	Catey Shaw	Revolution	"Revolution"
2014	Catey Shaw	The Brooklyn EP	"Human Contact"
2014	Bassnectar	Noise vs. Beauty	"You & Me" (feat. W. Darling)
2015	Jem And The Holograms	Jem And The Holograms (The Official Motion Picture Soundtrack)|	"We Got Heart"
2015	Jem And The Holograms	Jem And The Holograms (The Official Motion Picture Soundtrack)|	"Alone Together"
2016	Snow Tha Product	Halfway There...Pt. 1	"Nights" (feat. W. Darling)
2016	Catey Shaw	The Ransom (EP)	"Tell Everyone"
2016	MAGIC	Primary Colours	"Red Dress"
2017	Virginia to Vegas	Utopian	"Wasted"
2017	Virginia to Vegas	Utopian	"F*** Me Up"
2017	Marcus & Martinus	Moments	"Get To Know Ya"
2017	K.I.D	Single	"Happy When I Cry"
2017	K.I.D	Single	"Elevator"
2017	About Time	Sabrina Claudio	"Wait"
2017	About Time	Sabrina Claudio	"Everlasting Love"
2017	About Time	Sabrina Claudio	"Wanna Know"
2017	About Time	Sabrina Claudio	"Frozen"
2017	About Time	Sabrina Claudio	"About Time (Intro)"
2017	Confidently Lost (EP)	Sabrina Claudio	"Tell Me"
2017	Confidently Lost (EP)	Sabrina Claudio	"Too Much Too Late"
2017	Confidently Lost (EP)	Sabrina Claudio	"Runnin Thru Lovers"
2017	Confidently Lost (EP)	Sabrina Claudio	"I Don't"
2017	Confidently Lost (EP)	Sabrina Claudio	"Orion's Belt"
2018	Sabrina Claudio	Fifty Shades Freed (Official Motion Picture Soundtrack)	"Cross Your Mind"
2018	Charlotte Lawrence	Single	"Everybody Loves You"
2018	Charlotte Lawrence	Single	"Young and Reckless"
2018	Charlotte Lawrence	Single	"Keep Me Up"
2018	Why Don't We	8 Letters	"Talk"
2019	Amaal	Black Dove (EP)	"Later"
2019	Amaal	Black Dove (EP)	"Coming & Going"
2019	Amaal	Black Dove (EP)	"Not What I Thought"
2019	Lennon Stella	Love me (EP)	"Feelings"
2019	Dinah Jane	Dinah Jane 1	"Fix It"
2019	Sinead Harnett	Single	"Pulling Away" (feat. Gallant)
2019	Cyn	Mood Swing	"Angel"
2019	Ekali	Single	"Be Fine" (feat. Wafia)
2019	TRACE	Like Hell EP	"Missing Me"
2019	Eric Nam	Before We Begin	"How'm I Doing"
2019	Fabolous	Summertime Shoutout 3: Coldest Summer Ever	"Time"
2019	The Chainsmokers	World War Joy	"See The Way"
2020
2020	Charlotte OC	Single	"This Pain"
2020	Lennon Stella	Three. Two. One.	"Save Us"
2020	Leah Kate	Used To This (EP)	"Bad Idea"
2020	Leah Kate	Used To This (EP)	"Used To This"
2020	Alina Baraz	It Was Divine	"My Whole Life"
2020	Alina Baraz	It Was Divine	"The Beginning"
2020	Alina Baraz	It Was Divine	"Memo Blue"
2020	Alina Baraz	It Was Divine	"More than Enough"
2020	Alina Baraz	It Was Divine	"Off the Grid" feat. Khalid
2020	Alina Baraz	It Was Divine	"Endlessly"
2020	Alina Baraz	It Was Divine	"Morocco" feat 6LACK
2020	Eric Nam	The Other Side	"How You Been"
2020	The Chicks	Gaslighter	"Everybody Loves you"
2020	Aluna	Renaissance	"Off Guard"
2021
2021	Epik High	Epik High Is Here (Part 1)	"Lesson Zero"
2021	Epik High	Epik High Is Here (Part 1)	"True Crime"
2021	Surf Mesa	Single	"Carried Away" (with Madison Beer)
2021	Alina Baraz	Sunbeam	"If You Let Me"
2021	Sinéad Harnett	Ready Is Always Too Late	"Anymore" (feat. Lucky Daye)
2021	Wafia	Single	"Wide Open" (feat Ta-ku & Masego)
2021	Mallory Merk	Counterparts	"Switchblades"
2022
2022	Claire Rosinkranz	Single	"123"
2022	Fitz and the Tantrums	Let Yourself Free	"Good Nights"
2023
2023	Sara Kays	Single	"Bored"
2023	Del Water Gap	Single	"Losing You"
2025
2025	Lily Allen	West End Girl	"West End Girl"

== Notes ==
=== References ===
- "Hayley Gene Penner Credits". AllMusic.
- "Hayley Gene Credits". AllMusic.
- "W. Darling Credits". AllMusic.
- "Hayley Gene Penner Songbook". Apple Songbook. Apple Music.
