= Anna Dagmar =

American singer-songwriter

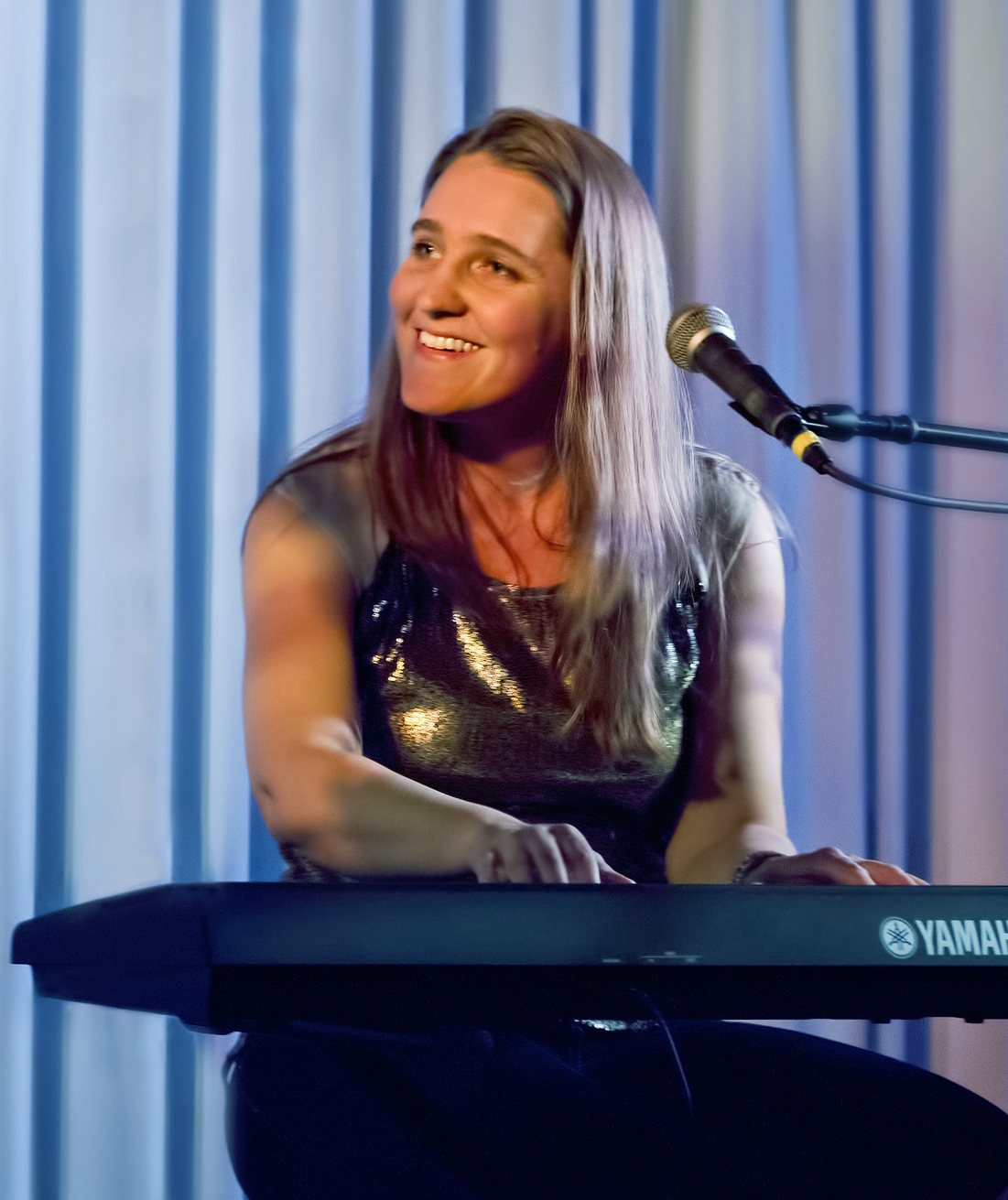
- Dagmar performing at the 2012 Northeast Regional Folk Alliance conference

Background information
- Born: Anna Dagmar Johnson
- Origin: Welwyn Garden City, England
- Genres: Singer-songwriter
- Instruments: Vocals, piano
- Years active: 2001–present

Anna Dagmar is an independent American pianist/singer-songwriter, based in Manhattan, New York. She is known for incorporating elements of folk music, classical music and jazz in her performances.

== Early life ==
Anna Dagmar was born in Welwyn Garden City, within the Welwyn Hatfield borough of Hertfordshire, England. She was exposed to classical music at a young age by hearing her father's opera recordings and from attending performances by the St Albans Cathedral Choir in nearby St Albans. She moved with her family to the state of Virginia in the United States when she was six, then relocated to Chelmsford, Massachusetts. Dagmar started taking piano lessons at the age of seven, which ultimately led to her interest in and pursuit of a career as a musician. Dagmar attended the Eastman School of Music in Rochester, New York, where she earned a degree in jazz piano performance and music education. She also studied classical piano performance privately in New York City with Elizabeth DiFelice, the Chair of the Piano Department at Princeton University. After school, Dagmar moved to New York City to pursue a career in music professionally.

== Career ==
In April 2001, Anna Dagmar self-released her debut album, One More Time in the Air. AllMusic Guide critic Zac Johnson gave the album a generally positive review, comparing Dagmar to songwriters Joni Mitchell and Tori Amos and stating that the album is made up of "spring breezes and guarded insights."

On March 7, 2004, Dagmar released her second full-length album, Solo Songs. Unlike her debut, this album features only piano and vocals. As on her debut album, all songs on the album are originals. The album received a positive review in Chorus and Verse magazine, with reviewer Matt Mrowicki stating that the album features "solid songwriting" and a "beautiful voice ... supported by an elegant and distinctive piano soundtrack.

In 2008, Anna Dagmar and Smile for Free Publishing released the Anna Dagmar Songbook, a book of sheet music of Anna's songs with piano-only accompaniment CDs.

Dagmar's third album, Let the Waves Come in Threes, was released in April 2009. It was produced by Ben Wittman and includes various special guests including guitarist Marc Shulman (who has played with Suzanne Vega), bassist Richard Hammond, and trumpeter Shane Endsley. Let the Waves Come in Threes is a full band album, unlike her previous album Solo Songs. Singer-songwriter Lucy Kaplansky praised the album, stating that it "showcases her gorgeous voice, lyrical piano stylings and lovely, intelligent songs."

In 2010, Dagmar started a fundraising project on crowd funding website Kickstarter for an as-yet untitled fourth album. The project was successfully funded, and in May 2012 Anna announced that her next album, a full-band album titled Satellite, would be released the following month. The album was released in June 2012, and has received a positive reception, with critic George Graham of WVIA-FM stating that the vocals on the album are Anna's "best yet," and noting in particular the extensive incorporation of folk, jazz and classical elements into her music. He calls the musical compositions "very tasteful, thoroughly appealing and often evocative." On May 7, Dagmar released a music video of the album's title song "Satellite," directed by Mitch Jacobson (who has worked with Paul McCartney) and choreographed by Annie Sailer.

Dagmar is currently writing a full-length musical in the BMI Lehman Engel Musical Theatre Workshop with lyricist Kevin Wanzor and is touring in the Northeastern United States.

== Musical style ==
Anna Dagmar's compositions are generally considered to fit within the singer-songwriter genre, but often include elements of folk, jazz, and classical music. Dagmar cites influences including folk rock singer-songwriter Jonatha Brooke and composer/pianist George Gershwin.

Anna is primarily a pianist and vocalist, but most of her recordings feature a full band, including guitar, bass, drums, and often her original string quartet arrangements. Notable musicians include drummer/producer Ben Wittman and guitarist Marc Shulman, both of whom Anna has stated have "added their signature sounds to [her] recordings."

== Discography ==
Year	Album details
2001	One More Time in the Air: Released: April 14; Self-Released
2004	Solo Songs: Released: March 7; Self-Released
2008	Anna Dagmar Songbook: Released: January 25; Label: Smile for Free Publishing; Includes sheet music and accompaniment CDs
2009	Let the Waves Come in Threes: Released: April 1; Self-Released
2012	Satellite: Released: June 1; Self-Released
