= Mitch Jacobson =

American film producer (born 1963)

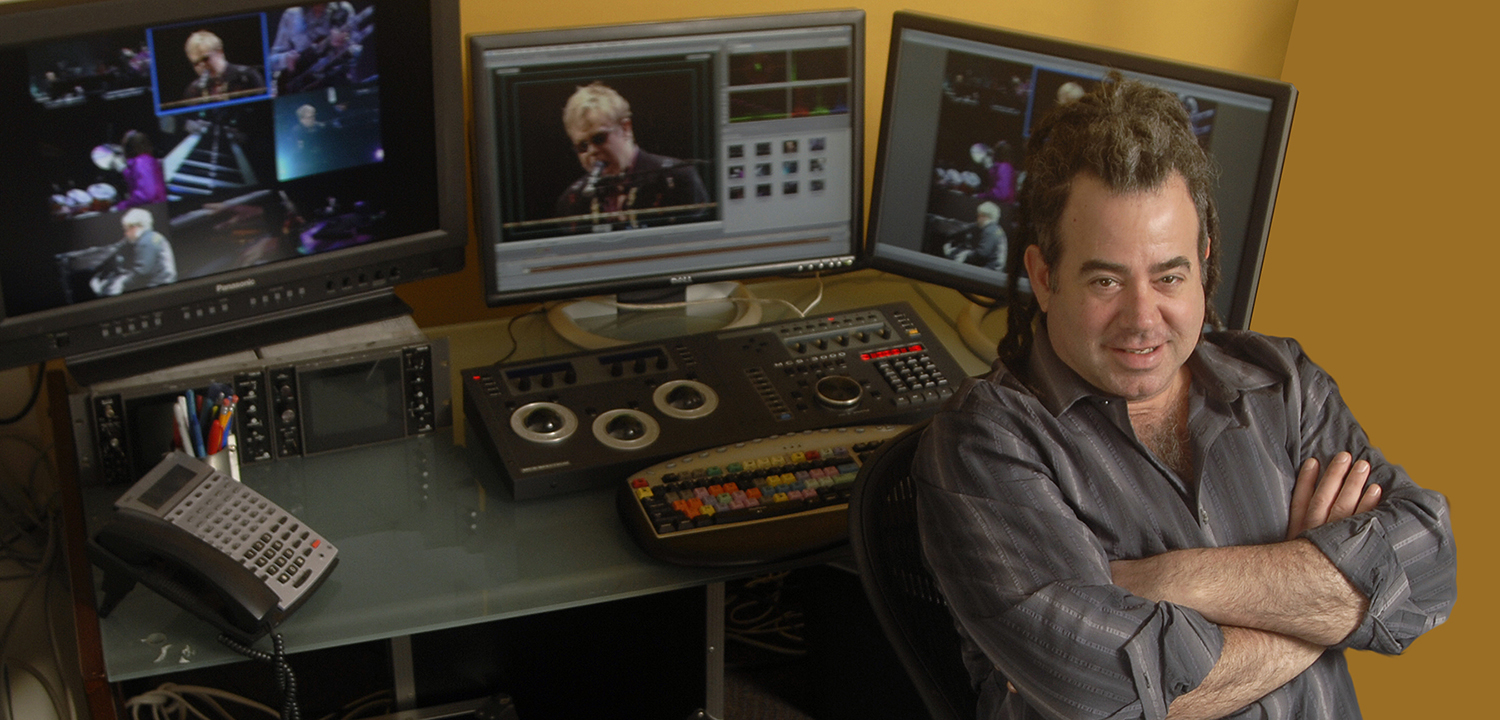
- Born: 1963 (age 61–62); Chicago, Illinois, U.S.
- Occupation(s): Producer/director; Video editor Educator
- Years active: 1984–present
- Website: categoryfivestudios.com

Mitch Jacobson (born 1963) is an American producer/director, video editor and educator specializing in multi-camera production.

== Early life and education ==
Jacobson attended the film program at the University of South Florida in Tampa, Florida. He then worked at a public access television station in Tampa, and as a freelance director/cameraman for a decade.

== Career ==
=== Multi-camera editing ===
Jacobson is an editor who has cut feature-length concert films and short-form publicity programs for numerous musicians including the Rolling Stones, Aerosmith, Paul McCartney and U2. He has produced and directed NFL and MLB programming for Fox Sports Channel, and edited comedy, music and awards shows for MTV. Paul McCartney Live In St. Petersburg, which he edited, was nominated for a 2006 Primetime Emmy Award for Outstanding Variety, Music or Comedy Special, and it was featured on the DVD Paul McCartney Live in Red Square, which won the MIPCOM Award for best music DVD of the Year. Paul McCartney: The Space Within Us is the largest multi-camera show Jacobson has edited, with 26 unique camera angles. He has also edited for numerous television shows, including Great Performances on PBS from 2008 to 2010, the Montel Williams Show from 2007 to 2008, America's Got Talent season 7 on NBC in 2012, Nick Cannon Presents: Wild 'N Out on MTV2 in 2013, and The Wendy Williams Show since 2011.

He is the owner of Category Five Studios, a creative editing and color boutique in New York City, and a member of the Motion Pictures Editors Guild.

=== Teaching ===
Jacobson is an Apple Certified Pro and trainer for the NewTek TriCaster multi-camera production system. He specializes in Avid, Final Cut Pro, Adobe Premiere Pro and NewTek TriCaster systems. He regularly presents multi-camera live stream, editing, directing and encoding workshops called StreamCamp across the US, for industry trade groups and conferences. In 2011, he began hosting Cutting It Close, a live web talk show for editors.

Jacobson's textbook Mastering MultiCamera Techniques was published by Focal Press in 2010. Intended for producers, directors and editors, it has information on multi-camera productions from a 2-camera interview to a 26-camera concert, and includes a DVD tutorial with multiple angle concert footage from Paul McCartney and Elton John. The book's foreword was written by Academy Award-winning editor Thomas A. Ohanian, formerly of Avid Technology.

== Filmography ==
=== Television ===
- The Reppies – editor, 2 episodes, 1996
- The 5th Wheel – editor, 1 episode, 2002
- 60 Minutes on Classic – editor, 7 episodes, 2004
- House of Dreams – post producer, 2004
- Isaac (Style Network) – editor, 2005–06
- Get Fresh with Sara Snow – editor, 2007
- Rachael Ray – editor, 1 episode, 2007
- The Montel Williams Show – editor, 33 episodes, 2007–08
- SundayArt News – editor, 10 episodes, 2009
- Rising: Rebuilding Ground Zero (Discovery Channel) – editor, 1 episode, 2011
- The Wendy Williams Show – editor, 14 episodes, 2011–14
- America's Got Talent (NBC) – editor, 12 episodes, 2012
- Annie's Search for Sandy – editor, 2012
- The Chew (ABC) – editor, 6 episodes, 2012
- MTVU Woodies Awards 2013 (MTVU) – editor, 2013
- O Music Awards (Viacom) – technical director, 2013
- Nick Cannon Presents: Wild 'N Out (MTV2) – editor, 12 episodes, 2013
- Guy Court (MTV2) – editor, 3 episodes, 2013
- Girl Code (MTV) – editor, 4 episodes, 2013–14

=== Concert films ===
- Music Choice OnStage Featuring the Barenaked Ladies – producer, director, editor, 2000
- New Sound Lounge –producer, director, editor, 2001
- Paul McCartney: Live in St. Petersburg – editor, colorist, 2003
- Aerosmith: You Gotta Move – field producer, editor, 2004
- Keith Urban: The Road to Be Here – editor, 2004
- Paul McCartney Backstage at Super Bowl XXXIX – editor, 2005
- Newport Jazz Festival – producer, editor, 2005
- Paul McCartney: The Space Within Us – post producer, editor, 2006
- Great Performances – editor, 3 episodes (Stevie Wonder, Eric Clapton and Steve Winwood, and Pavarotti), 2007–09
- Aimee Mann: Live from the Artists Den (TV series) – editor, 2008
- Ben Harper: Live from the Artists Den – editor, 2008
- U2: 360 Degrees at the Rose Bowl – additional editor, 2010
- Rufus Wainwright: Live from the Artists Den – editor, 2012
- Kid Rock: Live from the Artists Den – editor, 2012

== Bibliography ==
=== Books ===
- Mastering MultiCamera Techniques: From Preproduction to Editing and Deliverables (Focal Press, 2010)

=== Articles ===
- "Multicam Madness!" – Creative COW, 2010
- "Live on the Net Without a Net: Cutting Live" – Creative COW, 2012
