= Steven Christian =

Steven Christian or Stephen Christian or variation, may refer to:

- Stephen Christian, American singer-songwriter
- Steve Christian (born 1951), Pitcairn Islands politician

== See also ==
- Christian von Steven (1781–1863), botanical name "Steven"; Finnish-Russian botanist and entomologist
- Christian (disambiguation)
- Stephen (disambiguation)
- Christine Stephen (disambiguation)
