= School of Motion =

American online learning platform

- Website type: Online education
- Available in: English
- Founded: 2013
- Creator: Joey Korenman
- CEO: Joey Korenman
- Website: schoolofmotion.com
- Registration: Required
- Users: 20,000+
- Current status: Active

School of Motion (SoM) is an online learning platform for motion designers. Founded by Joey Korenman in 2013, School of Motion grew from a series of After Effects tutorials by Korenman, to his course Animation Bootcamp, to over 30 courses taught by industry professionals.

School of Motion also offers free resources. They have a YouTube channel with over 400,000 subscribers which features tutorials and a weekly motion design industry news roundup, and tool reviews. They often partner with Adobe to offer workshops and demonstrations, with various School of Motion staff and instructors presenting at Adobe MAX and NAB.

School of Motion is a Maxon authorized training partner for Cinema 4D and Redshift. They were also an Adobe Authorized Training Center until the closure of the AATC program in 2023.

== History ==
After years as a Creative Director at an advertising agency and as an instructor at Ringling College of Art and Design, Joey Korenman left Boston and spent the next two years developing content for School of Motion.

== Specialization ==
- Motion design
- Animation
- Visual effects basics
