= Christine Stevens =

Christine Stevens may refer to:

- Chris Stevens (mathematician), American mathematician
- Christine Stevens (animal welfare activist) (1918–2002), American animal welfare activist and conservationist

== See also ==
- Christine Stephens, New Zealand psychology academic
