= Automatic Duck =

- Company type: Private
- Industry: Software
- Founded: 2001
- Headquarters: Snohomish, Washington, USA
- Products: Timeline translation software used in the television and film industry
- Number of employees: 4
- Website: www.automaticduck.com

Automatic Duck is a software developer based near Seattle known for their plug-ins that translate edited sequences between Final Cut Pro, Avid, After Effects, Quantel, Pro Tools and other professional digital video editing tools.

== History ==
Automatic Duck was founded in 2001 by Harry Plate and Wes Plate, father and son respectively. Before this time the junior Plate has been working as a video editor and frequently needed the ability to translate Avid sequences into After Effects. Wes was quite familiar with the OMFI file format and knew if After Effects could be made to read OMF it would open many possibilities for editors around the world. Harry's career was as a software engineer, having worked for Texas Instruments, Hewlett Packard and Agilent Technologies.

Ideas for a plug-in for After Effects were discussed as early as 1999, but it wouldn't be until October 2000 that development would begin in earnest.

Automatic Duck's first product, an After Effects import plug-in that could read Avid OMF exports, was called Automatic Composition Import and shipped just before the National Association of Broadcasters exposition in April 2001.

In December 2001 Automatic Duck began courting the growing Final Cut Pro user community with the announcement of Automatic Composition Import FCP, a plug-in set that would allow Final Cut Pro sequences to be translated into After Effects.

Automatic Duck started offering interchange between Final Cut Pro and Avid in July 2002 with Automatic Sequence Export Pro, a plug-in that could export an OMF composition for import into an Avid editing system. In February 2003 MacWorld magazine awarded Automatic Sequence Export PRO 4.5 stars.

A tool to import Avid sequences into Final Cut Pro was released in December 2003 with a plug-in called Pro Import FCP, a plug-in for Final Cut Pro that read OMF files.

In 2004 Automatic Duck released Pro Import C3, a plug-in for Discreet's Combustion compositing software. Pro Import C3 was later renamed Pro Import Cmb.

Eventually the After Effects import plug-in was renamed Pro Import AE and the Final Cut OMF export plug-in was renamed Pro Export FCP. The plug-ins have improved in the amount of information translated as well as adding support for newer file formats such as AAF, MXF and XML. Pro Import AE is now at version 4.0, Pro Import FCP at version 2.0 and Pro Export FCP at version 4.0.

In September 2011 Automatic Duck announced a close partnership with Adobe Systems to bring that same interchange functionality to Premiere Pro. Wes Plate joined the Adobe Product Marketing team while Harry Plate will be assisting with the technology integration. The company later announced that due to Wes and Harry relocating to Adobe all Automatic Duck products would be offered free of charge, stating that they will not be able to offer a level of customer support that justifies charging for their products.

== Community involvement ==
Since the beginning, Automatic Duck has been a supporter of editing user groups, sponsoring After Effects, Final Cut Pro and Avid user groups around the United States and Canada.

Automatic Duck President Wes Plate has a long history with online community support, having been a member of the Avid-L since 1996 and having in the past been a leader on the WWUG and Creative COW as well as being active on other listservs and discussion forums.

Automatic Duck is also a leader in standards development, being an Associate Member of the Advanced Media Workflow Association helping to guide the development of the AAF file format.

== Products ==
=== Current products ===
- Pro Import AE 4.0
- Pro Export FCP 4.0
- Pro Import FCP 2.0
- Media Copy 4.3.0
- ProDate DV

=== Discontinued products ===
- Pro Import PPro
- Pro Export PPro
- Pro Import Cmb 1.0
