= Journal of Cross-Cultural Gerontology =

- Discipline: Aging
- Language: English
- Edited by: Margaret A. Perkinson

Publication details
- History: 1986-present
- Publisher: Springer Science+Business Media
- Frequency: Quarterly
- Impact factor: 0.900 (2010)

Standard abbreviations
- ISO 4: J. Cross-Cult. Gerontol.

Indexing
- CODEN: JCCGEB
- ISSN: 0169-3816 (print); 1573-0719 (web)
- LCCN: 94660501
- OCLC no.: 12823676

Links
- Journal homepage; Online access

The Journal of Cross-Cultural Gerontology is a peer-reviewed academic journal publishing articles on the aging process. The journal includes articles covering both Western and non-Western societies, covering disciplines including history, anthropology, sociology, political science, psychology, population studies, and health care and taking both theoretical or applied approaches.

== Abstracting and indexing ==
The journal is abstracted and indexed in:

- Academic OneFile
- Academic Search
- AgeLine
- Anthropological Literature
- EMBASE
- EMCare
- International Bibliography of Book Reviews
- International Bibliography of Periodical Literature
- International Bibliography of the Social Sciences
- ProQuest
- PsycINFO
- PubMed/MEDLINE
- Scopus
