= Christina Stevens =

Dutch pedagogue and missionary

Christina Stevens (17 November 1825 – 23 May 1876) was a Dutch pedagogue and missionary. She became famous for her work as a missionary teacher of Christianity among the native people of the Dutch East Indies.
