= Optic Nerve =

Optic Nerve may refer to:

- Optic nerve, the anatomical structure
- Optic Nerve (GCHQ), a mass surveillance program run by the British intelligence agency GCHQ
- Optic Nerve (comics), a comic book series
- Optic Nerve (CD-ROM), a Red Hot Benefit Series tribute to David Wojnarowicz
- Optic Nerve Studios, a special make-up effects studio run by Glenn Hetrick
