= Christopher Stevens =

Christopher or Chris Stevens or Stephens may refer to:

- Paul Tabori (1909–1974), British-Hungarian author, also known as Christopher Stevens
- Chris Stephens (cricketer) (born 1948), South African cricketer
- J. Christopher Stevens (1960–2012), American ambassador to Libya killed by al Qaeda terrorists in Benghazi September 11, 2012
- Christopher Stevens (musician) (born 1967), American record producer and songwriter
- Chris Larkin (Christopher Larkin Stephens, born 1967), English actor
- Chris Stephens (born 1973), Scottish National Party Member of Parliament for Glasgow South West, 2015–2024
- Chris Stephens (rugby union) (born 1975), Welsh rugby union player
- Chris Stevens (Northern Exposure), a character on Northern Exposure
