= About Time (Sabrina Claudio album) =

Mixtape by Sabrina Claudio
- Released: October 5, 2017
- Genres: Alternative R&B; indie pop; neo soul
- Length: 40:47
- Labels: SC Entertainment; Artist Partner Group; Atlantic
- Producers: Stint; Derek Renfroe; Alex Tanas; Sad Money; Blue Rondo; Mark Pellizzer; Nick Seeley; Robert Bergin

Sabrina Claudio chronology
Confidently Lost (2017)	About Time (2017)	No Rain, No Flowers (2018)

Singles from About Time
- 1. "Unravel Me" Released: May 18, 2017; 2. "Belong to You" Released: July 27, 2017

About Time is the debut mixtape by American singer and songwriter Sabrina Claudio. It was released on October 5, 2017, by SC Entertainment. The follow-up to her successful debut extended play, Confidently Lost, it explores similar genres to its predecessor, namely alternative R&B, indie pop, and neo soul.

The mixtape album, which also blends elements from electronic, jazz, and Latin music, was supported by two singles: "Unravel Me" and "Belong to You". The latter saw re-release in the form of a remix with American singer 6lack, which was included as a bonus track on the project. "Unravel Me" eventually peaked at number twenty-two on the Billboard Twitter Emerging Artists chart, while the original version of "Belong to You" peaked at number two on the same chart.

About Time received critical acclaim from critics, who specifically directed praise at Claudio's songwriting abilities, and the mixtape's lyrical themes, which largely related to escapism, liberation, loneliness, and romance. Critical reception was also positive for the project's production, which consisted of an overall experimental, minimalist sound crafted from a variety of producers, including Stint, Alex Tanas, and Derek Renfroe, among others.

== Background ==
The project's first single titled "Unravel Me" was officially released on May 18, 2017, followed by the second single, "Belong to You" on July 27, 2017. Both songs were accompanied by official music videos. Claudio announced the mixtape and revealed the track list on October 3, 2017, and on October 4 an official remix for "Belong to You" featuring American singer 6lack was premiered by Carl Chery on Zane Lowe's Beats 1 radio show.

On the day of the mixtape's release, October 5, 2017, Zane Lowe premiered the track "Frozen" on his Beats 1 radio show and interviewed Claudio. About the title of the mixtape, Claudio stated: "I subconsciously wrote every song having to deal with time in some way, shape or form. I think in these moments I've been so worried about time and then it just kind of translated into my music".

== Critical reception ==
The mixtape received critical acclaim from music critics. A review from ThisisRnB commented "Sabrina’s natural sensuality oozes through each track across About Time. Elements of modern soul are combined with her lush harmonies and aural pleasing tones to produce a spectacularly rapturous project". Ones to Watch praised the mixtape by saying "Sabrina Claudio captivates listeners with breathy, sweet vocals and lush arrangements. Claudio wrote all twelve songs on the new release, proving herself an intriguing lyricist with the power to forge her own path in this scene".

== Track listing ==
About Time track listing
No.	Title	Writer(s)	Producer(s)	Length
1.	"About Time (Intro)"	Sabrina Claudio; Derek Renfroe; Hayley Gene Penner; Jordan Benjamin	Renfroe	1:10
2.	"Natural"	Claudio; Brandon Canada	Blue Rondo; Stint	3:26
3.	"Everlasting Love"	Claudio; Penner	Mark Pellizzer; Alex Tanas	3:39
4.	"Belong to You"	Claudio; Ajay Bhattacharyya	Stint	3:06
5.	"Unravel Me"	Claudio; Bhattacharyya	Stint	4:05
6.	"Stand Still"	Claudio	Stint	4:43
7.	"Wanna Know"	Claudio; Penner; Kaela Sinclair; Max Townsley	Nick Seeley; Robert Bergin	4:01
8.	"Frozen"	Claudio; Penner; Renfroe; Tanas	Tanas; Renfroe	4:04
9.	"We Have Time"	Claudio	Rondo; Sad Money	3:19
10.	"Used To"	Claudio	Sad Money	3:07
11.	"Wait"	Claudio; Penner	Pellizzer; Tanas; Stint	3:02
12.	"Belong to You (Remix)" (featuring 6lack)	Claudio; Bhattacharyya; Ricardo Valentine	Stint	3:05
Total length:				40:47

== Charts ==
Chart performance for About Time
Chart (2017)	Peak position
New Zealand Heatseeker Albums (RMNZ)	9
US Billboard 200	115
US Top R&B Albums (Billboard)	12
