= Rosey (musician) =

American singer and songwriter

- Born: Nancy Joy Kaye; Stamford, Connecticut, U.S.
- Origin: United States
- Genres: Rock, soul, jazz, funk, trip hop
- Occupations: Singer, songwriter, composer, record producer
- Years active: 1999–present
- Labels: Island Def Jam, Quango Music Group, Six Degrees Records, El Guapo Records
- Website: https://roseymusic.com/

Rosey (born Nancy Joy Kaye) is an American singer, songwriter, composer, and record producer. She first gained international attention with her debut album Dirty Child (2002) on Island Def Jam. She became associated with the early 2000s Urban Rock movement and was described by Entertainment Weekly as "the lovechild of Robert Plant and Rickie Lee Jones."

== Early life ==
Rosey was born and raised in Stamford, Connecticut. Her birth name is Nancy Joy Kaye. She is the sixth great-granddaughter of American revolutionary figure Paul Revere. Her grandfather, Milton Kaye, was a New York pianist and arranger who accompanied Jascha Heifetz and later composed music for early U.S. television.

Her parents were lifelong chorale singers, and Rosey has described her upbringing as "a musical where every conversation turned into three-part harmony."

== Early music industry work ==
In high school, Rosey interned for concert promoter John Scher, assisting backstage crews and artist hospitality for touring acts. She later attended Emerson College in Boston, earning a Bachelor of Science degree in Communications. During this period, she completed internships at Sub Pop Records, Elektra Records, Sony Music, Capitol Records, and A&M Records, where she later worked as an A&R talent scout.

She also worked in Boston's live music scene, including at Club Axis.

== Transition to performing artist ==
Encouraged by David Eugene Edwards of 16 Horsepower, Rosey left A&R work to pursue music full-time. She moved to San Francisco and performed at Bay Area venues including Bottom of the Hill.

She later relocated to New York City, where she became a regular performer at The Bitter End, CBGB Gallery, and Wetlands. In 1999, she signed a recording contract with Island Def Jam Records.

== Dirty Child (2002) ==
Rosey's debut album, Dirty Child, was recorded in Los Angeles with producer Darryl Swann. Members of Macy Gray's touring band performed on the album. The song "Love" appeared in the film Bridget Jones's Diary (2001) The single also received radio airplay and chart success in Turkey and Germany.

Rosey appeared as a musical guest on The Tonight Show with Jay Leno in 2002.

== Jazz and stylistic shift ==
In 2008, Rosey released the jazz-influenced album Luckiest Girl on Quango Music Group. She later recorded Be Somebody Blues (2018), inspired by the American songbook and small-ensemble jazz tradition.

== Lal Meri ==
In 2009, Rosey co-founded the world-music and dance project Lal Meri with Carmen Rizzo and Ireesh Lal. The group's album was released on Six Degrees Records and reached the iTunes World Music charts.

== Film and television work ==
Film and television work

Rosey's music has appeared in several major film and television soundtracks. Her song "Love" was featured in the films Bridget Jones's Diary (2001) and Shallow Hal (2001). The song later served as the theme for the Israeli television series Screenz.

Additional soundtrack placements include the film Monster-in-Law (2005).

In 2002, Rosey appeared as a musical guest on The Tonight Show with Jay Leno.

== The Green House Atlanta ==
In 2010, Rosey relocated to the Atlanta region and co-founded The Green House Atlanta, a recording and production studio, with partner Aaron Hill. The studio has recorded albums and live sessions for artists including SUSTO, Grails, Bob Wayne, and Nat Myers, among others.

At The Green House Atlanta, Rosey works as a producer, engineer, and collaborator, recording albums and sessions with nationally touring and recording artists across multiple genres.

== Discography ==
=== Studio albums ===
- Dirty Child (2002) – Island Def Jam
- Luckiest Girl (2008) – Quango Music Group
- Be Somebody Blues (2018) – Independent
- I Heard You Been Singin' (2023) – El Guapo Records
- In the Light (2024) – El Guapo Records
- The Rhythm of Love (2025) – El Guapo Records
