= Aging and Mental Health =

Aging & Mental Health
- Discipline: Aging, mental health
- Language: English
- Edited by: Martin Orrell, Rebecca Allen, Terry Lum

Publication details
- History: 1997-present
- Publisher: Routledge
- Frequency: 8/year
- Impact factor: 3.658 (2020)

Standard abbreviations
- ISO 4: Aging Ment. Health

Indexing
- CODEN: AMHTFD
- ISSN: 1360-7863 (print); 1364-6915 (web)
- OCLC no.: 36731481

Links
- Journal homepage; Online access; Online archive

Aging & Mental Health is a peer-reviewed monthly scientific journal published by Routledge covering research on the relationship between the aging process and mental health. The editors-in-chief are Martin Orrell, Rebecca Allen, and Terry Lum.

== Abstracting and indexing ==
The journal is abstracted and indexed in PubMed and Web of Science. According to the Journal Citation Reports, the journal has a 2020 impact factor of 3.658.

== See also ==
- Mental health
- Gerontology
