= Christine Stephens =

New Zealand ageing researcher

Christine Stephens ONZM
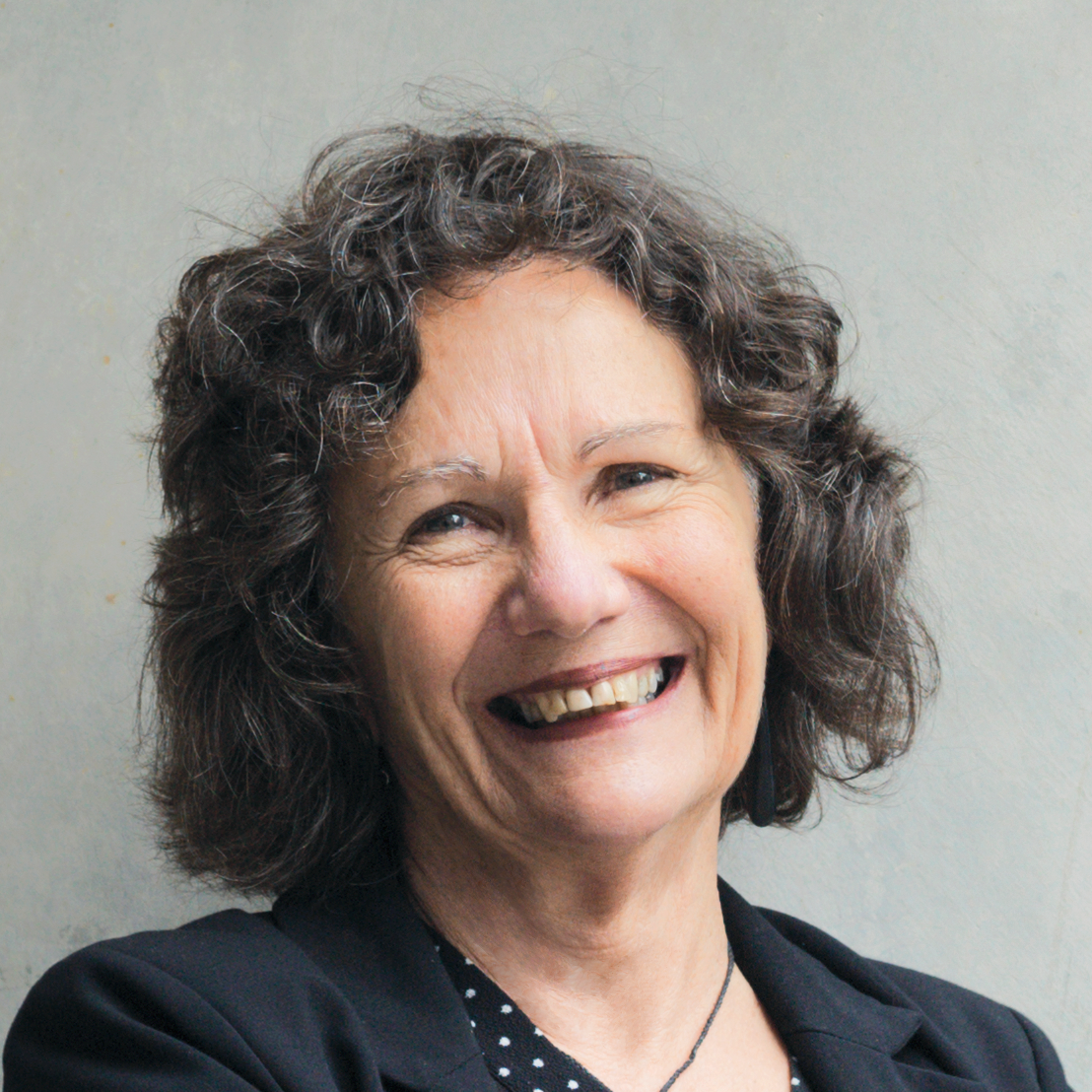
- Other name: Christine Vivienne Stephens
- Education: Massey University
- Scientific career
- Workplaces: Massey University
- Thesis: Occupational overuse syndrome and psychosocial stressors in the work place (1993)

Christine Vivienne Stephens ONZM is a critical health psychologist and New Zealand psychology academic. She is currently professor of psychology at Massey University based in the Palmerston North. She is one of the founding members of the International Society of Critical Health Psychology, which she has also chaired.

== Career ==
Stephens completed a master's degree at Massey University on occupational overuse syndrome and psychosocial stressors, followed by a PhD on occupational overuse in the New Zealand police force in 1993. She joined the staff at Massey in 1996, rising to professor. Upon appointment she developed a course in health promotion, which was offered from 2001 and which she taught until 2016. During this time she authored a book on health promotion, entitled Health Promotion: A Psychosocial Approach and published in 2008. Stephens co-leads the cross-disciplinary Health and Ageing Research Team (HART) with Fiona Alpass, also at Massey. The team's major focus is a longitudinal study of quality of life in ageing (Health, Work and Retirement study), the New Zealand Longitudinal Study of Ageing. The research team has conducted bi-annual surveys of a population sample of older people for over 10 years. The research also includes in-depth qualitative studies on topics such as informal care-giving, palliative care, experiences of terminal illness, and housing needs.

== Scholarship ==
Stephen's current research is located at the intersection of health psychology and gerontology. Her scholarly work is presently focused on the requirements of the ageing population and the need to provide information for supportive social policy and practice. She has made a significant theoretical contribution to this area, along with colleague Mary Breheny, an associate professor at Massey University and member to the Health and Ageing Research Team. Together they have drawn on Amartya Sen's well-known capability approach to develop a nuanced theoretical framework that transcends a purely biomedical view by recognizing ideas of resilience, as well as the experiences of older people themselves in determining what it means to age well.

== Honours and awards ==
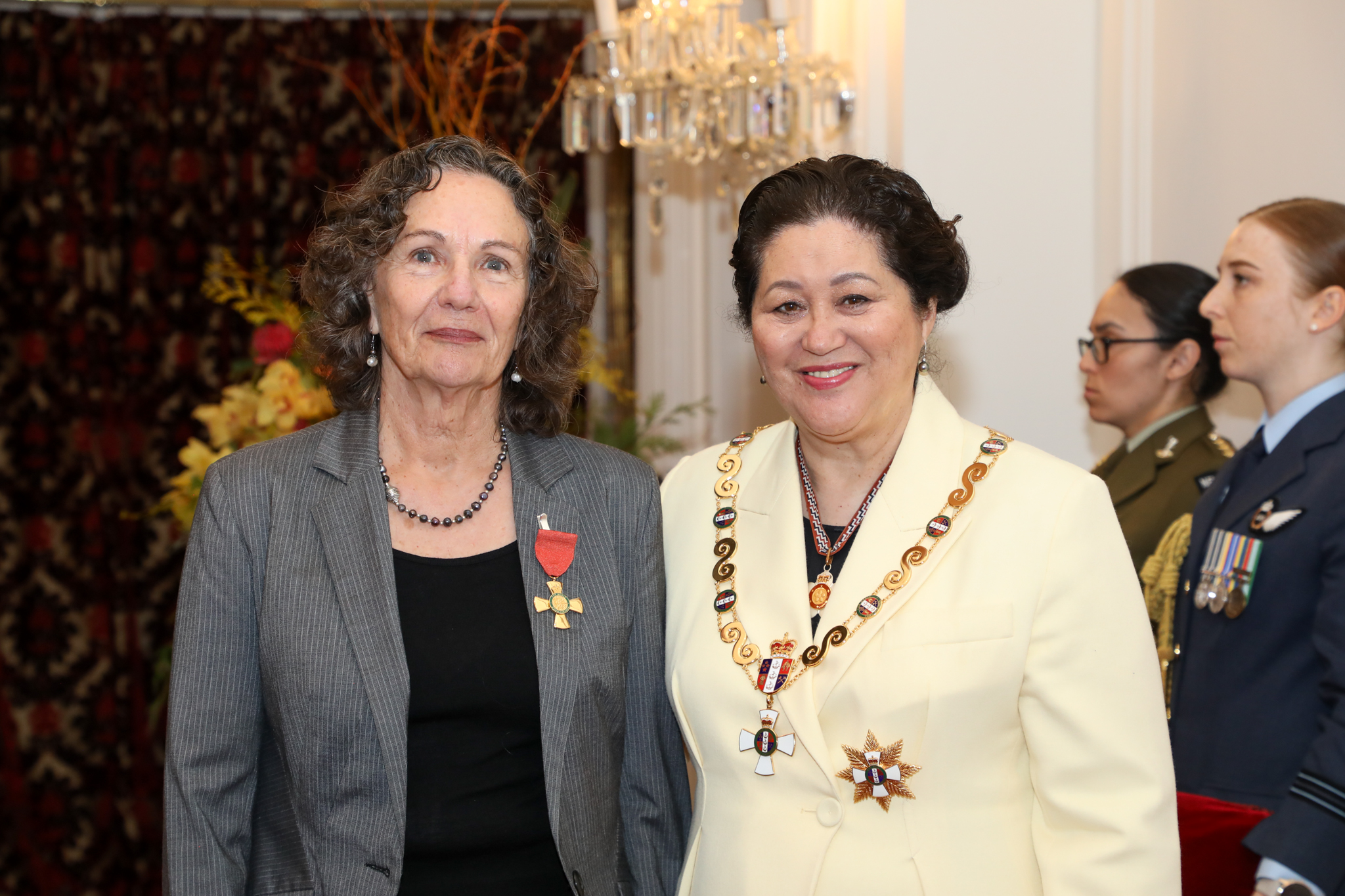
Stephens (left), after her investiture as an Officer of the New Zealand Order of Merit by the governor-general, Dame Cindy Kiro, at Government House, Wellington, on 6 September 2024

In the 2024 King’s Birthday Honours, Stephens was appointed an Officer of the New Zealand Order of Merit, for services to health psychology and seniors.

== Selected works ==
- Noone, Jack H., and Christine Stephens. "Men, masculine identities, and health care utilisation." Sociology of Health and Illness 30, no. 5 (2008): 711–725.
- Stephens, Christine, and Nigel Long. "Communication with police supervisors and peers as a buffer of work-related traumatic stress." Journal of Organizational Behavior (2000): 407–424.
- Stephens, Christine. "Social capital in its place: Using social theory to understand social capital and inequalities in health." Social Science & Medicine 66, no. 5 (2008): 1174–1184.
- Stephens, Christine, Nigel Long, and Ian Miller. "The impact of trauma and social support on posttraumatic stress disorder: A study of New Zealand police officers." Journal of Criminal Justice 25, no. 4 (1997): 303–314.
- Stephens, Christine, Fiona Alpass, Andy Towers, and Brendan Stevenson. "The effects of types of social networks, perceived social support, and loneliness on the health of older people: Accounting for the social context." Journal of Aging and Health 23, no. 6 (2011): 887–911.
