= Chris Stephens (cricketer) =

South African cricketer

Personal information
- Full name: Christopher George Stephens
- Born: 8 January 1948 (age 78); Cape Town, South Africa
- Batting: Right-handed

Domestic team information
- Years: Team
- 1968–69 to 1971–72: Western Province
- 1972–73 to 1977–78: Transvaal

Career statistics
Competition	First-class	List A
Matches	38	7
Runs scored	2273	230
Batting average	43.51	32.85
100s/50s	7/7	1/1
Top score	165	104
Balls bowled	18	0
Wickets	0	–
Bowling average	–	–
5 wickets in innings	–	–
10 wickets in match	–	–
Best bowling	–	–
Catches/stumpings	41/–	1/–
- Source: Cricinfo, 6 April 2017

Christopher George Stephens (born 8 January 1948) is a former cricketer who played first-class cricket in South Africa from 1968 to 1978.

His most successful season was his first, when he played for Western Province in the B Section of the Currie Cup in 1968–69. In his second first-class match he made 153 in three hours in an innings victory over North Eastern Transvaal, and later that season he made 165 in another innings victory, over Transvaal B.

When Western Province returned to the A Section of the Currie Cup in 1969–70 he continued his good form, scoring 755 runs in the next two seasons at an average of 50.33. His form declined after that. He moved to Transvaal in 1972–73, and spent most of the rest of his career in the B Section of the Currie Cup with Transvaal B.
