= Japan Anthropology Workshop =

Anthropology-based academic association in Japan

Japan Anthropology Workshop (JAWS)
- Type: Academic association
- Established: 1984
- Website: https://www.japananthropologyworkshop.org

Japan Anthropology Workshop (JAWS) is an international academic association concerned with furthering the field of anthropology of Japan. JAWS holds major conferences – some in conjunction with the European Association for Japanese Studies (EAJS) – as well as smaller workshops and seminars. It runs a website and issues a newsletter. JAWS publishes selected works on Japan anthropology in partnership with Routledge.

The first conference was organised in Oxford in March 1984. It is now a conference held approximately every 18 months, organised with hosts across the world.

== History ==
The Japan Anthropology Workshop developed out of a growing international interest in the anthropology of Japan, both for anthropologists looking at Japan as a country which may have a contribution to make to their own specialist field, and from scholars already specialising in Japanese studies who increasingly appreciate the insights that an anthropological approach can bring to their work. The idea for JAWS was conceived at the 1982 European Association of Japanese Studies (EAJS) Conference in The Hague, after which a planning meeting was organised the following year at the Nissan Institute for Japanese Studies in Oxford. The first workshop was held in March 1984 when a need was identified for a forum for the growing but largely isolated band of anthropologists of Japan to meet together and exchange ideas. It was here that JAWS was officially founded.

== Conferences ==
An overview of the JAWS conferences from 2005.

Date	Title	Subject	Location	Keynote speaker	Notes
2005	16th JAWS Conference	East Meets West	University of Hong Kong	Emiko Ohnuki-Tierney	
2005	17th JAWS Conference	Time and Memory	University of Vienna		Held in conjunction with the 11th European Association for Japanese Studies (EAJS) Conference
2007	18th JAWS Conference	Japan and Materiality in a Broader Perspective	University of Oslo	Joy Hendry	
2010	20th JAWS Conference	Religion, Ritual, and Identity in Japan	University of Texas at Austin	Delores Martinez	
2011	21st JAWS Conference		Otago University, at Dunedin		
2011	22nd JAWS Conference		Tallinn University in Estonia		Held concurrent with Section 5 (Anthropology and Sociology) of the 13th EAJS Conference
2013	23rd JAWS Conference		University of Pittsburgh, USA		
2014	24th JAWS Conference	1. Living with disaster: Comparative approaches 2. Mutual anthropology: a proposal for future equality in the discipline	Chiba, Japan	1. Dr. Hayashi Isao and Dr. Brigitte Steger; 2. Professors Joy Hendry and Shioji Yuko	Held at the International Union of Anthropological and Ethnological Sciences and organised by the Japanese Society of Cultural Anthropology (JACSA)
2014	25th JAWS Conference		Ljubljana, Slovenia		Held concurrent with Section 5 of the 14th International Conference of the European Association
2015	26th JAWS Conference		1. Boğaziçi University, Istanbul Turkey; 2. Seijo University, Tokyo; 3. LMU Munich, Germany		
2016	27th JAWS Conference		Kobe University, Japan		Held concurrent with the 2nd EAJS Japan Conference
2017	28th JAWS Conference		Lisbon, Portugal		Held concurrent with section 5a and 5b of the 15th EAJS International Conference
2019	29th JAWS Conference		Aarhus University, Denmark		
