= Research on Aging =

- Discipline: Social gerontology
- Language: English
- Edited by: Jeffrey E. Stokes

Publication details
- History: 1979-present
- Publisher: SAGE Publications
- Frequency: Bimonthly
- Impact factor: 1.298 (2012)

Standard abbreviations
- ISO 4: Res. Aging

Indexing
- ISSN: 0164-0275
- LCCN: 79643857
- OCLC no.: 301749381

Links
- Journal homepage; Online access; Online archive

Research on Aging is a peer-reviewed academic journal that covers the field of social gerontology. The editor-in-chief is Jeffrey E. Stokes (University of Massachusetts Boston). It was established in 1979 and is published by SAGE Publications.

== Abstracting and indexing ==
Research on Aging is abstracted and indexed in Scopus and the Social Sciences Citation Index. According to the Journal Citation Reports, its 2012 impact factor is 1.298, ranking it 13th out of 30 journals in the category "Gerontology".
