= Sabrina Claudio =

American singer and songwriter

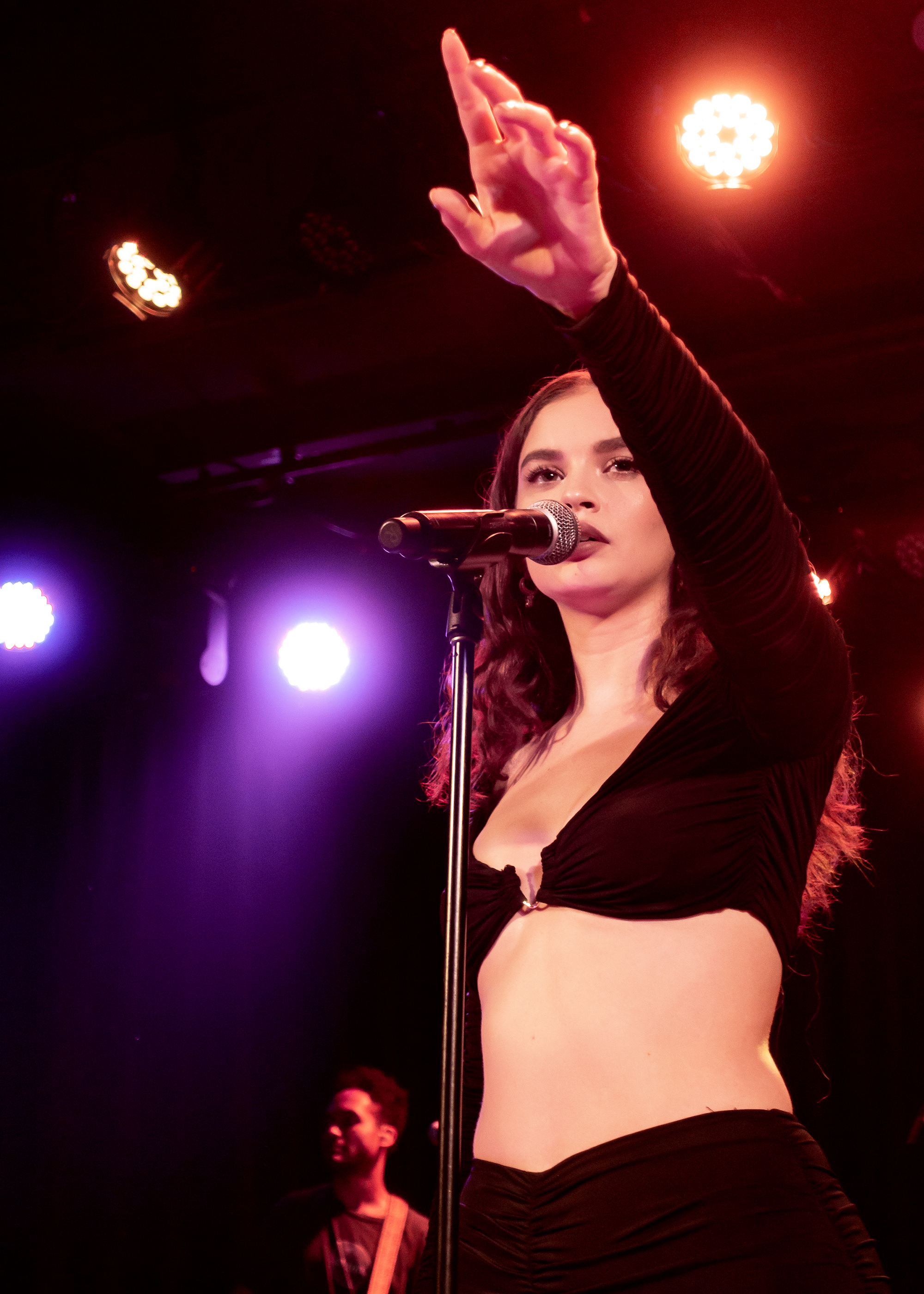
- Claudio in 2018

Background information
- Born: September 19, 1996 (age 30); Miami, Florida, U.S.
- Origin: Fort Lauderdale, Florida, U.S.
- Genres: R&B; alternative R&B; pop
- Occupations: Singer; songwriter
- Instrument: Vocals
- Years active: 2016–present
- Labels: SC Entertainment; Artist Partner Group; Atlantic; RedOne
- Website: www.sabrinaclaudio.com

Sabrina Claudio (born September 19, 1996) is an American singer and songwriter. In late 2016, Claudio uploaded several songs to SoundCloud, before compiling a select collection as part of her debut extended play, Confidently Lost, which was released independently in March 2017.

2017 was her breakout year; her single "Unravel Me" peaked at number 22 on the Billboard Twitter Emerging Artists chart, and "Belong to You" peaked at number two and was certified Gold by the RIAA. Her debut mixtape, About Time, was released on October 5; it peaked at number 13 on Billboard's Top R&B/Hip-Hop Albums chart.

Between 2018 and 2022, she put out four albums, including Truth Is and Christmas Blues. By 2024, with over 30 million views, her most-viewed YouTube video was "Stand Still" from her debut mixtape.

== Life and career ==
Claudio grew up in Fort Lauderdale, Florida. She is of Cuban and Puerto Rican descent. She later moved to Los Angeles, where she began her music career in earnest. She first began recording and releasing video covers on Twitter and YouTube before transitioning to original tracks which she released on SoundCloud. Over the course of 2016, Claudio released several singles, including "Runnin' Thru Lovers", "Orion's Belt", and Confidently Lost.

These songs would form part of her EP, Confidently Lost, which she originally released independently on SoundCloud. The EP received a wide release in March 2017 via SC Entertainment. In May 2017, she released a single, "Unravel Me", off of an upcoming project due to be released later in 2017. The song would go on to peak at #22 on the Billboard Twitter Emerging Artists chart. She released another single for that project entitled "Belong to You" in July 2017, which peaked at #2 on the same chart.

It was announced in August 2017 that Claudio would be touring North America with 6lack on his Free 6lack Tour.

On October 5, 2017, Claudio's debut full-length digital mixtape, About Time, was officially released. The mixtape is supported by the singles "Unravel Me" and "Belong to You". From October through November 2017, Apple Music promoted Claudio as their Up Next artist, a series that focuses on breakthrough artists by documenting their journey, inspiration and influences through exclusive interviews, live performances and a mini-documentary.

On April 2, 2018, Claudio released the single "All to You" followed by "Don't Let Me Down" featuring Khalid on April 4. Her debut studio album No Rain, No Flowers, was released on August 15, 2018, preceded by the single "Messages From Her". Her management is SAL&CO/Neal Atweh.

In 2022, Claudio was credited as a songwriter on "Plastic Off the Sofa", the eighth track on Beyoncé's seventh studio album, Renaissance, for which she received a nomination for Album of the Year at the 65th Annual Grammy Awards.

== Controversies ==
In April 2018, a series of screenshots began to circulate around the social media app Twitter showcasing Claudio's use of several racial slurs, and other offensive language directed at black women. She also was accused of using a second account on Twitter to share racist messages. Claudio issued a now-deleted apology on Twitter for her actions.

== Tours ==
Headlining

- No Rain No Flowers Tour (2018)
- Truth Is Tour (2019)
- Based on a Feeling Tour (2022)

Supporting

- 6lack – Free 6lack Tour (2017)
- Russ - Into The W!LD Tour (with Big Sean) (2025)

== Discography ==
=== Studio albums ===
List of albums with selected album details
Title	Details
No Rain, No Flowers	Released: August 15, 2018; Label: SC Entertainment, APG/Atlantic; Formats: Digital download, streaming
Truth Is	Released: October 4, 2019; Label: SC Entertainment, APG/Atlantic; Formats: Digital download, streaming
Christmas Blues	Released: November 27, 2020; Label: SC Entertainment, APG/Atlantic; Formats: Digital download, streaming
Based on a Feeling	Release date: May 6, 2022; Label: SC Entertainment, Atlantic; Formats: CD, digital download, streaming
Fall in Love with Her	Release date: June 6, 2025; Label: SC Entertainment, EMPIRE; Formats: CD, digital download, streaming

=== Mixtapes ===
List of mixtapes with selected album details and chart positions
Title	Details	Peak positions			
Title	Details	US	US R&B	US Heat	NZ Heat.
About Time	Released: October 5, 2017; Label: SC Entertainment, APG/Atlantic; Formats: Digital download, streaming, vinyl	115	14	10	9

=== Compilations ===
List of compilations with selected album details
Title	Details
Archives & Lullabies	Released: February 10, 2023; Label: SC Entertainment; Formats: Streaming

=== Extended plays ===
List of extended plays with selected album details and chart positions
Title	Details	Peak positions
Title	Details	US Heat
Confidently Lost	Released: March 3, 2017 (US); Label: SC Entertainment, APG/Atlantic; Formats: Digital download, streaming	18
Up Next Session: Sabrina Claudio	Released: October 5, 2017; Label: SC Entertainment, APG/Atlantic; Formats: Digital download, streaming	—
"—" denotes items which were not released in that country or failed to chart.

=== Singles ===
==== As lead artist ====
Title	Year	Peak chart positions			Certifications	Album
Title	Year	US R&B	US R&B Dig.	NZ Heat.	Certifications	Album
"Confidently Lost"	2017	—	—	—		Confidently Lost
"Unravel Me"	2017	—	—	—		About Time
"Belong to You"	2017	—	—	—	RIAA: Platinum	About Time
"Belong to You" (remix) (featuring 6lack)	2017	—	—	—		About Time
"Frozen"	2017	—	14	—		About Time
"All to You"	2018	—	—	—		Non-album singles
"Don't Let Me Down" (featuring Khalid)	2018	22	11	10		Non-album singles
"Messages From Her"	2018	—	—	—		No Rain, No Flowers
"Numb"	2018	—	—	—		No Rain, No Flowers
"Energy" (with ASAP Rocky and Burns)	2019	—	—	21		Non-album single
"As Long as You're Asleep"	2019	—	—	—		Truth Is
"Holding the Gun"	2019	—	—	—		Truth Is
"Rumors" (featuring Zayn)	2019	—	—	—		Truth Is
"Warm December"	2020	—	2	—		Christmas Blues
"Christmas Blues" (with the Weeknd)	2020	—	2	—		Christmas Blues
"Put On Repeat"	2022	—	—	—		Based on a Feeling
"Better Version"	2022	—	—	—		Based on a Feeling
"Don't Speak" (with Marshmello)	2024	—	—	— (Note: "Don't Speak" did not enter the NZ Heatseeker Singles Chart, but peaked at number 39 on the NZ Hot Singles Chart.)		Non-album singles
"No Question" (with Tyga)	2024	—	—	—		Non-album singles
"Need U to Need Me"	2025	—	—	—		Fall in Love with Her
"Before It's Too Late"	2025	—	—	—		Fall in Love with Her
"Memory Foam"	2025	—	—	—		Fall in Love with Her
"—" denotes items which were not released in that country or failed to chart.

==== Promotional singles ====
Title	Year	Album
"On My Shoulders"	2019	Truth Is
"Truth Is"	2019	Truth Is

==== As featured artist ====
Title	Year	Album
"Compromise" (Gallant featuring Sabrina Claudio)	2019	Sweet Insomnia
"See the Way" (The Chainsmokers featuring Sabrina Claudio)	2019	World War Joy
"SBCNCSLY" (Black Coffee featuring Sabrina Claudio)	2020	Subconsciously

=== Guest appearances ===
List of non-single guest appearances
Title	Year	Other artist(s)	Album
"Cross Your Mind"	2018	—N/a	Fifty Shades Freed: Original Motion Picture Soundtrack
"Cross Your Mind" (Spanish version)	2018	—N/a	Fifty Shades Freed: Original Motion Picture Soundtrack
"Song for You"	2018	David Dilin	Albert Chain
"That’s Why I Love You"	2019	SiR	Chasing Summer
"Inhale / Exhale"	2023	Austin Millz	—N/a

=== Music videos ===
List of music videos, showing year released and directors
Title	Year	Director(s)	Ref.
"Orion's Belt"	2016	DOBS & Sean Gowdy	
"Confidently Lost"	2016	Daniel Behrens	
"Tell Me" and "Too Much Too Late"	2017	Daniel Behrens	
"Unravel Me"	2017	Sasha Samsonova	
"Belong to You"	2017	Millicent Hailes	
"Holding the Gun	2019	—N/a	
"Compromise"	2019	—N/a	
"That's Why I Love You"	2019	—N/a	
"Rumors"	2019	—N/a	
"Warm December"	2020	—N/a	
"Put On Repeat"	2022	Jonah Christian	
"Better Version"	2022	Ambar Navarro	
"Don't Make Me Wait"	2022	Sabrina Claudio	
