= Journal of Aging and Health =

- Discipline: Aging
- Language: English
- Edited by: Kyriakos S. Markides

Publication details
- History: 1989-present
- Publisher: Sage Publications
- Frequency: 8/year
- Impact factor: 2.168 (2016)

Standard abbreviations
- ISO 4: J. Aging Health

Indexing
- CODEN: JAHEEG
- ISSN: 0898-2643 (print); 1552-6887 (web)
- LCCN: 89656211
- OCLC no.: 17766752

Links
- Journal homepage; Online access; Online archive

The Journal of Aging and Health (JAH) is a medical journal covering aging published by SAGE Publications. It covers research on gerontology, including diet/nutrition, prevention, behaviors, health service utilization, longevity, and mortality. The editor-in-chief is Kyriakos S. Markides.

== Abstracting and indexing ==
The Journal of Aging and Health is abstracted and indexed in Scopus, PubMed, and the Social Sciences Citation Index. According to the Journal Citation Reports, its 2016 impact factor is 2.168, ranking it 24 out of 77 journals in the category "Health Policy & Services" and 12 out of 32 journals in the category "Gerontology".
