= Creative COW =

Online support community for multimedia professionals

- Predecessor: Media 100 Worldwide Users Group
- Creators: Kathlyn and Ron Lindeboom
- Website: creativecow.net
- Launched: 11 April 2001; 25 years ago
- Current status: active

Creative COW is a website of support communities for digital video, video editing, and media production professionals in broadcasting, motion graphics, visual effects and film.

It provides over 60 online support discussion forums spanning a wide range of professional video tools and software.

Additionally, Creative Cow offers over 1,000 free text and video tutorials, has nearly two dozen different podcasts, as well as other resources for video professionals. Creative COW is funded by advertising and sponsorship from manufacturers.

COW is a backronym for "Communities of the World".

== History ==
Creative COW was founded in April 2001 by Kathlyn and Ron Lindeboom, a married couple.

The website evolved from the couple's earlier Media 100 Worldwide Users Group (WWUG), which began in 1995, and was sold to Digital Media Net in January 2000.

After the sale of WWUG, the Lindebooms decided to create another website. Initially, Kathlyn Lindeboom was Creative COW's director and chief officer, while Ron shifted roles from a developer to operations. In late 2002, Ron took over as the company's CEO, while Kathlyn shifted to operations and Human Resources.

Over the years, Creative COW grew to be one of the largest and longest-running online communities for multimedia professionals. As of 2021, 71% of the site's visitors (5.3 million annual visitors) were Gen Z and Millennials, while 25% (1.9 million annual visitors) were mid-career professionals.

In 2022, Creative COW LLC was dissolved and Creative COW's trademarks, assets, and intellectual property were reassigned from Ronald Lindeboom to Brielyn Clayton. The Creative COW website and forums are still in operation.

== Creative COW Magazine ==
In 2006 Creative COW launched a quarterly trade magazine, the Creative COW Magazine, which grew in 2008 to become a bimonthly, and in 2011 was cited by a trade journal which reports on issues and trends related to the magazine printing trade, who named Creative COW Magazine as one of the FOLIO: 40 for 2011.

The magazine was discontinued by 2013.
