= Primary Colours (Magic! album) =

Studio album by Magic!
- Released: July 1, 2016
- Recorded: 2015 at Larrabee Studios, North Hollywood, California and Noah's Ark, Toronto, Ontario, Canada
- Genre: Reggae; pop; reggae fusion
- Length: 35:16
- Label: Latium; RCA; Sony
- Producer: Adam Messinger; MAGIC!

Magic! chronology
Don't Kill the Magic (2014)	Primary Colours (2016)	Expectations (2018)

Singles from Primary Colours
- 1. "Lay You Down Easy" Released: March 24, 2016; 2. "Red Dress" Released: June 17, 2016; 3. "No Regrets" Released: October 14, 2016

Primary Colours is the second full-length studio album by Canadian reggae fusion band MAGIC! The album was released on July 1, 2016, through Latium and RCA Records worldwide. It serves as the follow-up to the band's debut studio album, Don't Kill the Magic (2014). The album was led by the single "Lay You Down Easy", featuring Sean Paul.

== Background ==
The group released their debut single "Rude" in late 2013, eventually achieving commercial success worldwide, reaching atop the U.S. Billboard Hot 100 singles chart for six consecutive weeks. The song had spent 16 weeks in the chart's top ten. With "Rude", Magic! is the sixth Canadian band to top the Billboard Hot 100, the first since Nickelback with "How You Remind Me" in 2001. The band released their debut studio album, Don't Kill the Magic on June 30, 2014. Upon its release, the album peaked at number 6 on the U.S. Billboard 200 and number 5 on the Canadian Albums Chart. The band proceeded to tour in support of their debut album, performing at colleges and music festivals throughout 2014 and 2015. The band toured as a supporting act on the first leg of pop rock band Maroon 5's Maroon V Tour from February to April 2015.

The band released the non-album single "#SundayFunday" on July 17, 2015, to mixed reviews and was not received well on radio airplay. They began writing and recording their second studio album in 2015 and finished production for the record in early 2016. The band announced the single "Lay You Down Easy", featuring dancehall recording artist Sean Paul. On May 16, the band revealed that album art cover for Primary Colours. The band announced the album's title, track listing and release date on April 12, 2016. The album's second single, "Red Dress", was released on June 17, 2016, accompanied with its music video.

== Promotion ==
The band released two commercial singles prior to the release of Primary Colours on July 1, 2016. The lead single, "Lay You Down Easy", featuring Sean Paul, was released on March 25, 2016. The single charted and peaked at number 40 on the Billboard Adult Pop Songs chart, number 36 on the Canadian Hot 100, number 26 on the Canadian Digital Songs chart, and number one on the Billboard Reggae Digital Songs chart.

The album's second single, "Red Dress", premiered on June 17, 2016. The music video for the single premiered on the same day on Vevo. Magic! performed their single "Red Dress" on The Today Show on June 5, 2016.

The album's third single "No Regrets", premiered on October 16, 2016, with an accompanying music video.

== Critical reception ==
Professional ratings
Review scores
Source	Rating
AllMusic	3/5 stars
Pitchfork	3.5/10
Renowned for Sound	3.5/5 stars

AllMusic's Heather Phares praised the band for following the template used in their debut single "Rude" to create pop songs that are both feel-good and catchy, while also writing "a few sleepy ballads ("No Regrets," "I Need You") and defiant outbursts ("Dance Monkey," "The Way God Made Me") that offer some variety," concluding that "Even with these detours, Primary Colours is a much tighter, more enjoyable album that shows Magic! can craft ultra-summery songs confidently and consistently." Jessica Mule of Renowned for Sound felt that the band surpassed their hit single with their second album, saying that "In 10 tracks, Magic! has written and created an easily digestible, pop tropical paradise from the 80s within Primary Colors [...] a proverbial invitation for listeners to not judge a book by its cover, or in this case, an artist by their global chart topper." Pitchfork writer Jeremy Gordon heavily panned the album for its songs that are "pop takes on basic reggae rhythms ("Red Dress")" or "sound like the band was ripping gravity bongs before putting pen to paper and melody to reel ("Gloria", "Lay You Down Easy")."

== Track listing ==
No.	Title	Writer(s)	Producer(s)	Length
1.	"Have It All"	Nasri Atweh; Adam Messinger; Mark Pellizzer; Alex Tanas; Ben Spivak	Adam Messinger; Nasri	3:38
2.	"Lay You Down Easy" (featuring Sean Paul)	Atweh; Tanas; Pellizzer; Spivak; Messinger; Sean Paul Henriques	Messinger; Tanas	2:44
3.	"Gloria"	Atweh; Messinger; Tanas; Pellizzer; Spivak	Messinger; Nasri	3:46
4.	"Red Dress"	Atweh; Hayley Gene Penner; Tanas; Messinger; Pellizzer; Spivak	Messenger	3:21
5.	"No Regrets"	Atweh; Messinger; Tanas; Pellizzer; Spivak; Fraser T Smith	Messinger; Nasri	3:32
6.	"Dance Monkey"	Atweh; Spivak; Pellizzer; Messinger; Tanas	Messinger; Pelli; Nasri	4:28
7.	"No Sleep"	Atweh; Messinger; Tanas; Pellizzer; Spivak	Messinger	2:47
8.	"I Need You"	Atweh; Pellizzer; Anthony Lavdanski; Messinger; Tanas; Spivak	Messinger; Pelli	3:51
9.	"Primary Colours"	Atweh; Pellizzer; Messinger; Tanas; Spivak	Messinger; Pelli; Nasri	3:23
10.	"The Way God Made Me"	Atweh; Tanas; Pellizzer; Spivak; Messinger	Pelli; Tanas; Nasri; Messinger	3:46
Total length:				35:16

== Personnel ==
Adapted from AllMusic.

MAGIC!

- Nasri – lead vocals, guitar, executive producer
- Mark "Pelli" Pellizzer – guitar, vocals
- Ben Spivak – bass, backing vocals
- Alex Tanas – drums, backing vocals

Additional personnel

- Delbert Bowers – mixing assistant (2)
- Vincent Calloway – trombone (1)
- Charles Chavez – executive producer
- Monique Chavez – photography
- Chris Galland – mixing assistant (2)
- Chris Gehringer – mastering (1, 3–10)
- Serban Ghenea – mixing (1, 3–10)
- Erwin Gorostiza – creative director
- John Hanes – mixing engineer (1, 3–10)
- Connie Jun – art direction, design
- Dave Kutch – mastering (2)
- Manny Marroquin – mixing (2)
- Fraser T Smith – guitar (5)
- Niv Toar – trumpet (1, 4, 6)

== Charts ==
Chart (2016)	Peak position
Canadian Albums (Billboard)	19
Japanese Albums (Oricon)	114
US Billboard 200	124

== Release history ==
Region	Date	Format	Label
Worldwide	July 1, 2016	Physical; digital download	Latium; RCA; Sony
