= Don't Kill the Magic =

Studio album by Magic!
- Released: 30 June 2014
- Recorded: 2012–2014
- Studios: Swing House Recording, Hollywood, California; The Ox, North Hollywood, California
- Genre: Reggae fusion
- Length: 42:10
- Labels: Latium; RCA
- Producers: Adam Messinger; Nasri Atweh; Mark Pellizzer; Alex Tanas

Magic! chronology
| Don't Kill the Magic (2014) | Primary Colours (2016) |

Singles from Don't Kill the Magic
- 1. "Rude" Released: 11 October 2013; 2. "Don't Kill the Magic" Released: 4 April 2014; 3. "Let Your Hair Down" Released: 7 October 2014; 4. "No Way No" Released: 3 March 2015

Professional ratings
Review scores
| Source | Rating |
|---|---|
| Herald-Tribune Online | (B+) |
| Renowned for Sound | 4/5 stars |
| AllMusic | 2.5/5 stars |
| UMusicians | 4/5 stars |
| 100% Rock | 8.5/10 stars |

Don't Kill the Magic is the debut studio album by Canadian reggae fusion band Magic!. It was released on 30 June 2014, through Latium Entertainment and RCA Records. The production on the album was primarily handled by Adam Messinger along with the other members of the band. The album was preceded by the single "Rude" which peaked at number six in Canada and became a chart-topper in the United States and the United Kingdom and top ten hit in Australia, New Zealand, Denmark, the Netherlands and Sweden.

Don't Kill the Magic also spawned three other singles: "Don't Kill the Magic", "Let Your Hair Down" and "No Way No". The album received generally positive reviews from music critics and was a moderate commercial success. It debuted at number six on the US Billboard 200 chart, selling 36,000 copies in its first week.

== Singles ==
Don't Kill the Magic was spawned by four singles from its songs. The lead single, "Rude" was originally released as promotional single on October 11, 2013. It was eventually re-released as the lead single from the album on February 24, 2014. The single peaked at number one on the US Billboard Hot 100, becoming MAGIC!'s most successful single in the US to date.

"Don't Kill the Magic" was released as the second (international) single from the album.

"Let Your Hair Down" was released as the third (second, in the US) single from the album.

"No Way No" was released as the fourth (third, in the US) single from the album.

== Commercial performance ==
Don't Kill the Magic debuted at number six on the US Billboard 200 chart, selling 36,000 copies in its first week. This became the group's first US top-ten debut on the chart. As of July 2016, the album has sold 156,000 copies in the United States.

In their home country of Canada, the album debuted at number five on the Canadian Albums Chart.

== Track listing ==
Credits adapted from album liner notes.

Standard version
| No. | Title | Writer(s) | Producer(s) | Length |
|---|---|---|---|---|
| 1. | "Rude" | Nasri Atweh; Mark Pellizzer; Adam Messinger; Alex Tanas; Ben Spivak | Messinger | 3:44 |
| 2. | "No Evil" | Atweh; Pellizzer; Tanas; Messinger | Messinger; Atweh; Pellizzer; Tanas | 3:22 |
| 3. | "Let Your Hair Down" | Atweh; Pellizzer; Tanas | Messinger; Pellizzer; Tanas; Atweh | 4:25 |
| 4. | "Stupid Me" | Atweh; Pellizzer; Tanas; Messinger | Messinger; Tanas; Pellizzer; Atweh | 3:44 |
| 5. | "No Way No" | Atweh; Pellizzer; Tanas; Spivak | Messinger; Tanas; Atweh | 3:51 |
| 6. | "Paradise" | Atweh; Messinger; Pellizzer | Messinger | 3:55 |
| 7. | "Don't Kill the Magic" | Atweh; Pellizzer; Tanas; Messinger | Messinger; Pellizzer^{[a]}; Tanas^{[a]}; Atweh^{[a]} | 3:37 |
| 8. | "One Woman One Man" | Atweh | Messinger; Atweh | 3:59 |
| 9. | "Little Girl Big World" | Atweh; Messinger | Messinger | 3:23 |
| 10. | "Mama Didn't Raise No Fool" | Atweh; Messinger | Messinger | 4:07 |
| 11. | "How Do You Want to Be Remembered" | Atweh; Messinger; Pellizzer; Spivak; Tanas | Messinger; Atweh | 4:03 |
| Total length: | | | | 42:10 |

Don't Kill the Magic — Japanese Version (bonus tracks)
| No. | Title | Writer(s) | Producer(s) | Length |
|---|---|---|---|---|
| 12. | "I Would" | Atweh; Messinger; Pellizzer; Spivak; Tanas | Messinger; Atweh | 2:53 |
| 13. | "Rude" (acoustic) | Atweh; Pellizzer; Messinger; Tanas; Spivak | Messinger | 3:43 |
| Total length: | | | | 48:46 |

- ^{^[a]} signifies a co-producer

== Charts ==
=== Weekly charts ===
| Chart (2014) | Peak position |
|---|---|
| Australian Albums (ARIA) | 66 |
| Canadian Albums (Billboard) | 5 |
| Japanese Albums (Oricon) | 70 |
| New Zealand Albums (RMNZ) | 30 |
| Scottish Albums (Official Charts) | 43 |
| Swedish Albums (Sverigetopplistan) | 25 |
| UK Albums (Official Charts) | 19 |
| US Billboard 200 | 6 |

=== Year-end charts ===
| Chart (2014) | Position |
|---|---|
| US Billboard 200 | 190 |

== Certifications ==
| Region | Certification | Certified units/sales |
|---|---|---|
| Mexico (AMPROFON) | Gold | 30,000^{‡} |
| Poland (ZPAV) | Platinum | 20,000^{‡} |
^{‡} Sales+streaming figures based on certification alone.

== Release history ==
| Country | Date | Format | Label |
|---|---|---|---|
| Canada | 30 June 2014 | CD; vinyl; digital download | Latium Entertainment; RCA Records; Sony Music |
| United States | 1 July 2014 | CD; vinyl; digital download | Latium Entertainment; RCA Records; Sony Music |
| Australia | 4 July 2014 | CD; vinyl; digital download | Latium Entertainment; RCA Records; Sony Music |
| United Kingdom | 4 August 2014 | CD; vinyl; digital download | Latium Entertainment; RCA Records; Sony Music |
| Japan | 24 September 2014 | CD; digital download | Latium Entertainment; RCA Records; Sony Music |
| Germany | 17 October 2014 | CD; vinyl; digital download | Latium Entertainment; RCA Records; Sony Music |
