= Sing Like Me =

Promotional single by Chris Brown

from the album Graffiti
- Released: November 24, 2009
- Recorded: The Compound (Orlando, Florida)
- Genre: R&B
- Length: 4:15
- Label: Jive; RCA
- Songwriters: Chris Brown; Big Makk; Keith Thomas; Lorenza "Big Lo" Lennon; Atozzio Towns
- Producers: Big Makk; Keith Thomas; Big Lo

Audio video
- "Sing Like Me" on YouTube

"Sing Like Me" is a song by American recording artist Chris Brown. It was released as a promotional single from his third studio album, Graffiti, on November 24, 2009, in the United States. The number was written by Brown, Big Makk, Keith Thomas, Lorenza "Big Lo" Lennon and Atozzio Towns, and produced by Makk, Thomas and Lennon. An R&B ballad, the song contains lyrics about Brown leaving a nightclub with several women. "Sing Like Me" received mixed response from critics, and charted for two weeks on the US Hot R&B/Hip-Hop Songs in 2010, peaking at number eighty-four.

== Background and composition ==
"Sing Like Me"
A sample of the song, demonstrating its slow tempo and "singing like me" hook. The tune utilizes Asian-influenced strings and 808 drums.

"Sing Like Me" was written by Chris Brown, Big Makk, Keith Thomas, and Lorenza "Big Lo" Lennon, with Makk, Thomas and Lennon producing the track. It was recorded at The Compound—a recording studio in Orlando, Florida—and Tony Maserati mixed the tune at The Record Plant—a studio in Los Angeles, California. The cover art of the song's promotional release is styled similarly to the cover of Graffiti. It has a retro look, showing Brown wearing black clothes and a red cardigan and sunglasses. "Sing Like Me" was released by Jive Records and RCA Records via the United States iTunes Store on November 24, 2009.

"Sing Like Me" is a slow jam R&B ballad, featuring 808 drum beats and a string arrangement featuring Asian influences. Billboard's Sarah MacRory likened the tune's beat to R. Kelly's "Feelin' on Yo Booty" (2001). Lyrically, the track is about Brown leaving a nightclub with several women, none of whom Brown wants to marry. The song's chorus features the hook "I gotta girl singin' like me". Yahoo! Music's reviewer said that the song has lyrics where Brown "boasts about the girls who can't get enough of him", and described the lyrics as Brown raving about "his celebrity status and his skills with women". A writer for Rap-Up wrote that on the song Brown "make[s] the ladies sing his praises."

== Reception ==
"Sing Like Me" was noted as one of the best tracks on Graffiti by a Yahoo! Music critic. That Grape Juice's review called the song "ridiculously catchy", and appreciated the subtlety with which Brown gave the lyrics, comparing the technique to Janet Jackson. The Associated Press described it as "cocky but alluring". Time Out New York's reviewer disliked the fact that "Sing Like Me" and "Crawl" were placed adjacently on Graffiti, but called both tunes "otherwise strong songs". The Boston Globe's Sarah Rodman called the song "skeevy", and compared it to the "sex stuff and braggadocio" of R. Kelly. Melinda Newman of HitFix noted its lack of creativity, while Nathan S. from the DJ Booth wrote that there is "nothing particularly remarkabl[e]" about "Sing Like Me" and Graffiti's lead single, "I Can Transform Ya". Roxana Hadadi of Express Night Out was unimpressed with the selfish adult lyrics on "Sing Like Me".

While it was not officially sent to radio, "Sing Like Me" entered the Billboard Hot R&B/Hip-Hop Songs at number ninety-six on March 6, 2010. The next week it rose to its peak position of number eighty-four, before falling off the chart the following week.

== Personnel ==
- Big Makk – songwriting, production
- Chris Brown – vocals, songwriting
- Lorenza "Big Lo" Lennon – songwriting, production
- Tony Maserati – audio mixing
- Brian Springer – recording engineer
- Keith Thomas – songwriting, production
- Atozzio Towns – songwriting
