= Don't Kill the Magic (song) =

Single by Magic!

from the album Don't Kill the Magic
- Released: April 4, 2014
- Genre: Pop; reggae rock
- Length: 3:37 (album version); 3:39 (single version)
- Label: Latium; RCA; Sony Music
- Songwriters: Nasri Atweh; Adam Messinger; Mark Pellizzer
- Producer: Adam Messinger

Magic! singles chronology
"Rude" (2013)	"Don't Kill the Magic" (2014)	"Let Your Hair Down" (2014)

Music video
- "Don't Kill the Magic" on YouTube

"Don't Kill the Magic" is a song recorded by Canadian reggae fusion band Magic! from their debut studio album of the same name (2014). It was written by group members Nasri Atweh and Mark Pellizzer along with the producer, Adam Messinger. Released on April 4, 2014 as the album's second single in select territories including New Zealand and Australia, it was not released in the United States due to "Rude" enjoying prolonged popularity and continuing to rise on the charts there.

== Music video ==
The official video for "Don't Kill the Magic" premiered April 23, 2014 and features the band performing in a dark room lit by pulsating lamps set up in the form of a giant capital 'M'.

== Chart performance ==
=== Weekly charts ===
Chart (2014)	Peak position
Australia (ARIA)	53
Canada Hot 100 (Billboard)	22
Canada AC (Billboard)	8
Canada CHR/Top 40 (Billboard)	12
Canada Hot AC (Billboard)	9

=== Year-end charts ===
Chart (2014)	Position
Canada (Canadian Hot 100)	72

== Release history ==
Country	Date	Format	Label
Australia	4 April 2014	Digital download	Sony Music Entertainment
New Zealand	4 April 2014	Digital download	Sony Music Entertainment
