= Alex Tanas =

Canadian-American musician (born 1986)

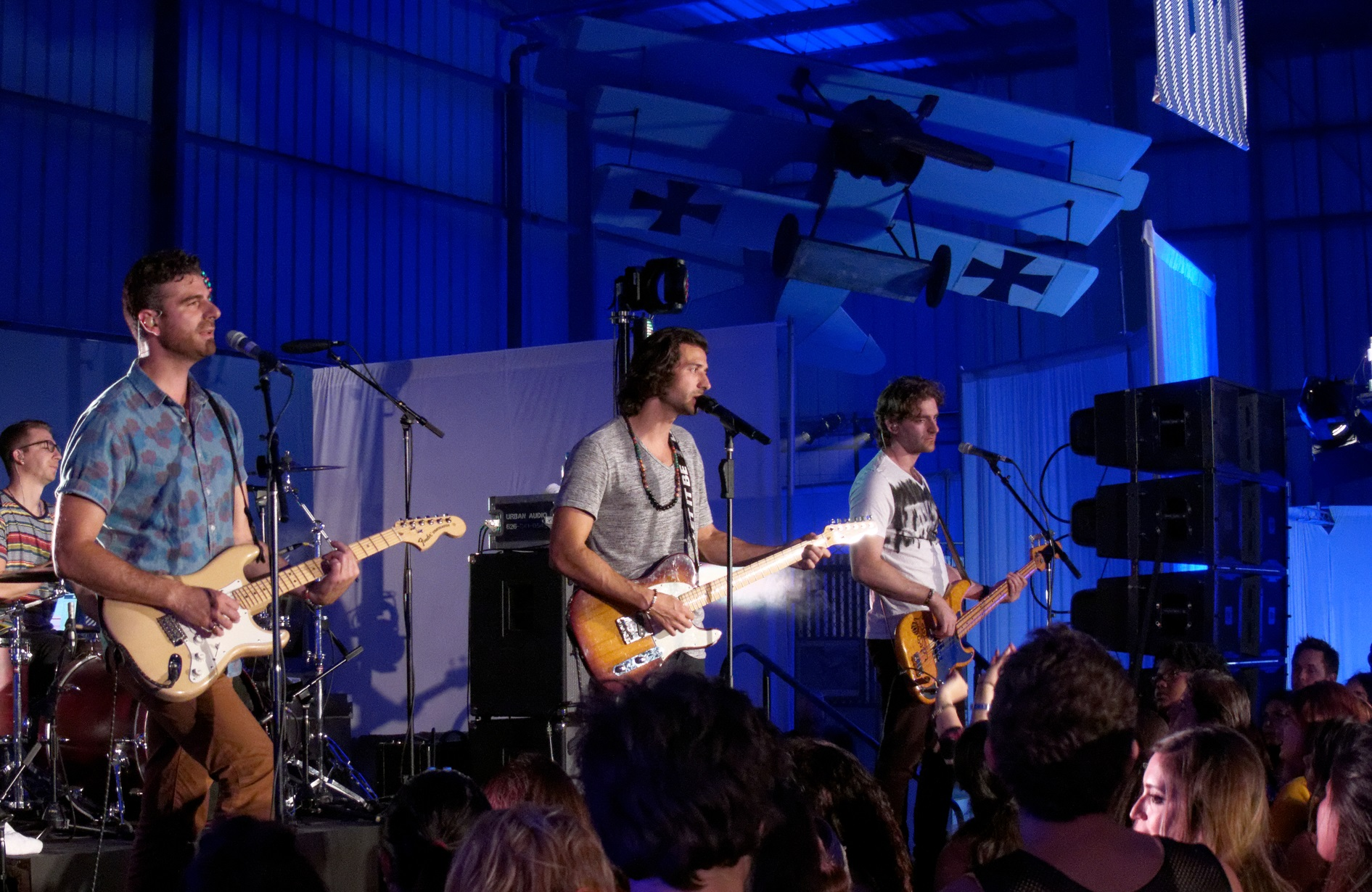
Alex Tanas (in background, first from left, with the drums) performing as part of the band Magic! in 2014

Alexander Vincent Tanas (born February 28, 1986), known professionally as Alex Tanas or Alexander Vincent, is a Canadian-American artist, producer, songwriter, and drummer. He is best known for being a former drummer and vocalist for the pop-reggae group Magic!. In addition to performing for Magic!, Tanas has collaborated with a number of musicians including Justin Nozuka, Kira Isabella, Benj, Pat Robbitaille, Leslie Pike, and Maneli Jamal. In 2018, Tanas began releasing his own solo music. Tanas currently resides in Los Angeles, California.

== Early life ==
Alex Tanas was born in Toronto, Ontario, Canada on February 28, 1986, of Ukrainian and Irish descent. He began drumming at ten years old. Tanas attended Earl Haig Secondary School in Toronto, Ontario, Canada.

== Collaborations with other artists ==
Tanas wrote, performed, and toured with the Justin Nozuka band for a total of six years, where he had the opportunity of opening for Stevie Wonder. He cites his biggest influences as Stewart Copeland and David Grohl. Tanas also performed with Canadian musician Kira Isabella and Pat Robitaille. He has also performed with Leslie Pike and Maneli Jamal.

Tanas is a frequent collaborator with singer-songwriter Hayley Gene Penner, and has been a co-writer and producer of all her songs. He also frequently collaborates with Sabrina Claudio, as he wrote and produced the songs "I Don't", "Frozen", "Everlasting Love", and "Wait." He has written all songs for singer vōx.

In 2014, Tanas co-wrote "Cut Me Deep" by Shakira with his bandmates from Magic!, in which they are also featured on the track.

In 2014, Tanas co-wrote "Coming Home", performed by Anthony Hamilton. In the same year, he served as a co-producer and co-writer of "Human Contact", performed by Catey Shaw on the EP titled The Brooklyn EP. Tanas co-wrote "Consider Me" for R&B artist Allen Stone, which appeared on his album titled Building Balance. In 2016, Tanas co-wrote and co-produced the tracks "Levitate" and "Lovesick" for Jacob Whitesides. Tanas co-wrote "Heavy Stone," performed by Justin Nozuka. In 2017, he co-wrote "Warm in December", performed by Michael Schulte. During the same year, he co-wrote "Bad News" for SOJA.

In 2019, he co-wrote and produced "Missing Me" for TRACE's EP titled Like Hell. He also co-wrote and produced the track "Continuum" for Tanerélle.

Apart from songwriting, Tanas has also performed drums for artists such as Justin Nozuka, Kira Isabella, Sabrina Claudio, Pat Robitaille, Leslie Pike, Maneli Jamal, and Luis Figueroa.

== Magic! ==
Tanas was a member of the pop-reggae group Magic!, alongside vocalist Nasri, bassist Ben Spivak, and guitarist Mark "Pelli" Pellizzer. While Mark Pellizzer was in Los Angeles, he called Alex Tanas to work on music together, since they knew each other from past collaboration with the Justin Nozuka Band. On his first visit, Tanas and the members of Magic! wrote "Stupid Me", "Don't Kill The Magic", and "Gypsy Woman", and decided to form the band.

As a band member, Tanas wrote and co-produced all Magic! songs.

In February 2022, Magic! announced that Tanas had left the band in a Facebook post.

== Solo music ==
Tanas began releasing his own solo music in 2018. He served as the co-writer and producer of the singles "Same Love", "I Won't", "Other People's Lives", "Free Myself", "Unravel", "Everything", and "Close to You."

In 2019, he co-wrote and produced "Miles Away", performed by Kan Wakan. Tanas is also featured on the track as a vocalist. The song was recognized by Vulture as one of the best new songs during its release.

== Awards and honors ==
Tanas is the recipient of two Juno Awards for "Single of the Year" for Magic's song "Rude", and Breakout Group of the Year. He is a recipient of the SOCAN Award for songwriting.
