= Let Your Hair Down =

Let Your Hair Down may refer to:

- Let Your Hair Down (album), by the Steve Miller Band, 2011
- "Let Your Hair Down" (Magic! song), 2014
- "Let Your Hair Down" (The Temptations song), 1973
- "Let Your Hair Down", a song by Starclub, 1992
- "Let Your Hair Down" (Grimm), a television episode

== See also ==
- "Let your hair hang down", Part 1 of "Evie", a 1974 song by Stevie Wright
