= Magic! =

Canadian reggae fusion band

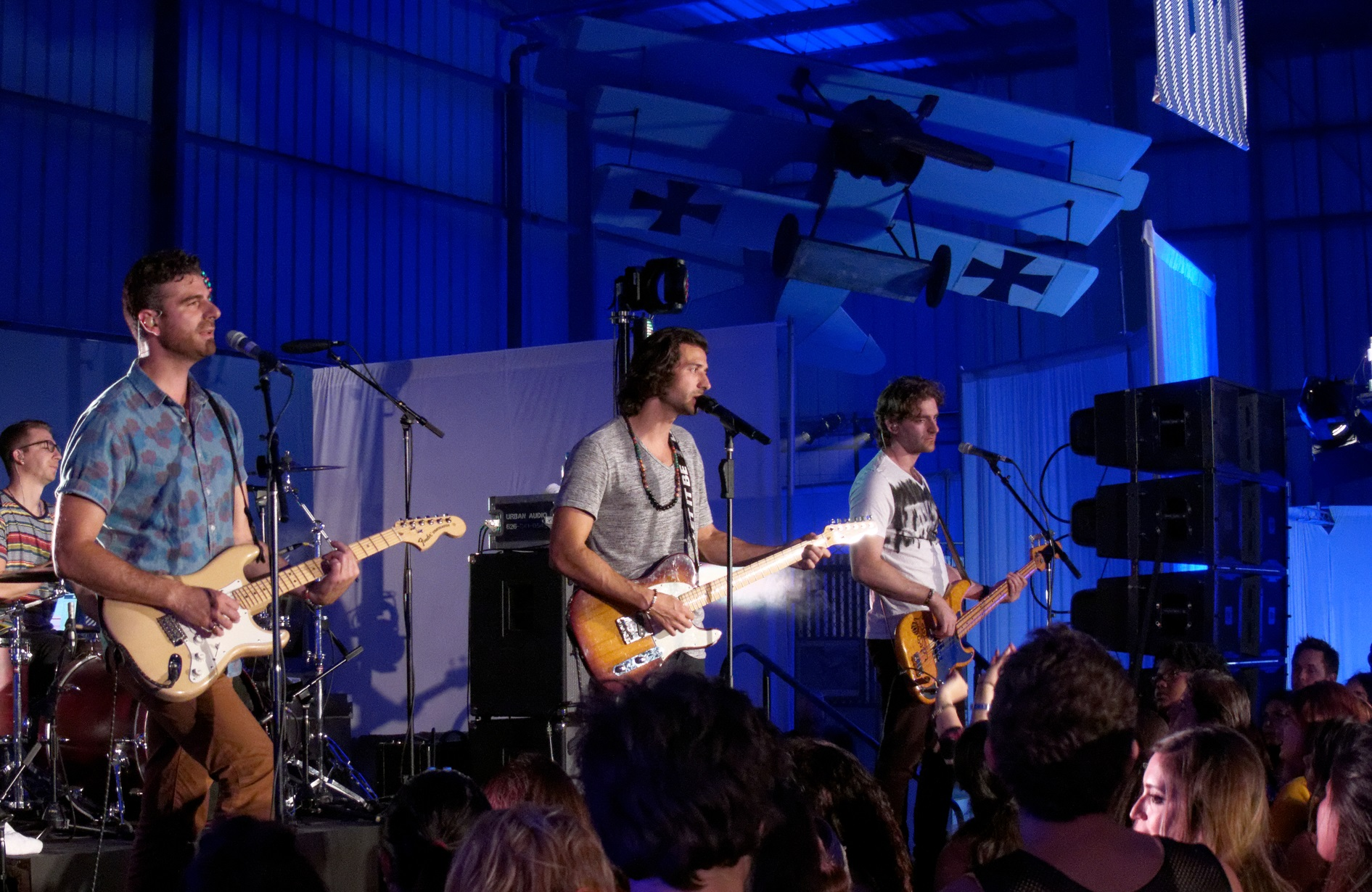
- Magic! performing in 2014. From left to right: Alex Tanas, Mark Pellizzer, Nasri, and Ben Spivak.

Background information
- Origin: Toronto, Ontario, Canada
- Genres: Reggae rock; reggae fusion; pop
- Years active: 2012–present
- Labels: Latium; Sony; RCA
- Members: Nasri (Nasri Tony Atweh); Mark "Pelli" Pellizzer; Ben Spivak
- Past members: Alex Tanas
- Website: thebandmagic.com

Magic! (stylized in all uppercase) is a Canadian reggae fusion band from Toronto. Based in Los Angeles, the band comprises lead vocalist/guitarist/producer Nasri Atweh, guitarist/keyboardist Mark "Pelli" Pellizzer, and bassist Ben Spivak. Active since 2012, the band is signed with Latium, Sony, and RCA Records, releasing their debut studio album Don't Kill the Magic in 2014, their second studio album Primary Colours in 2016, and their third studio album Expectations in 2018. They are best known for their hit single "Rude", which charted at No. 1 in several countries worldwide, including the US and UK.

The band is heavily inspired by the Police and Bob Marley and the Wailers. They are known for having a signature reggae-influenced pop sound.

== History ==
=== Early years ===
All members of the band are from the Toronto area of Canada. The lead singer of Magic!, Nasri, had worked with and written songs for different pop acts prior to the start of the band, mainly alongside Adam Messinger, together known as the Messengers. He met Mark Pellizzer in the studio and within a week they wrote the song "Don't Judge Me" for Chris Brown. Nasri described the chemistry between himself and Pellizzer as "different than writing chemistry, it was more artistic." A few weeks later, while Mark was playing a reggae tune on the guitar, Nasri suggested starting a band like "modern-day Police."

Next to join the band was Alex Tanas. He and Mark Pellizzer knew each other since they both had been members of the Justin Nozuka band for several years.

Finally, Ben Spivak joined the band in May 2013. Prior to joining Magic!, Spivak had been playing with the Toronto-based Julian Taylor Band, releasing "Never Gonna Give You Up" in 2012. Julian Taylor and Jeremy Elliot had enjoyed success playing in Staggered Crossing with "Further Again" hitting #6 in 2001 on the Canadian Hot 100 chart.

=== 2013–2015: Don't Kill the Magic ===
Magic!'s debut single "Rude" was released on October 12, 2013. The song peaked at number six on the Canadian Hot 100 and also proved a great international success, topping the charts in the United States and the United Kingdom and peaking within the top ten of the charts in Australia, New Zealand, Denmark, the Netherlands, and Sweden.

"Don't Kill the Magic" was released as the second single from the album on April 4, 2014, peaking at number twenty-two on the Canadian Hot 100 and fifty-three in Australia.

The band released their debut album Don't Kill the Magic on June 30, 2014. The album peaked to number 5 on the Canadian Albums Chart and number 6 on the Billboard 200.

On October 7, 2014, "Let Your Hair Down" was issued to contemporary hit radio by RCA Records as the third single from the album (the second to be released in the US). It peaked at number 20 on the Canadian Hot 100 chart. The official music video, directed by David Rousseau, was published online on October 31, 2014.

Magic! was among the performers at the 15th Annual Latin Grammy Awards held on November 20, 2014. Marc Anthony joined the band on stage for a special performance of "Rude".

On November 23, 2014, Wyclef Jean and Magic! performed together at the 42nd American Music Awards.

From February until June 2015, Magic! opened for Maroon 5 in North America and Europe on their Maroon V Tour. The band also had additional solo gigs.

In March 2015, Magic! won two Juno Awards - for Breakthrough Group of the Year and Single of the Year, out of five nominations. Adam Messinger won the Juno Award for Producer of the Year.

In April 2015, "No Way No" was released as a single. It peaked at number 23 in Canada. The official video had been uploaded on YouTube since March 2, 2015.

On June 13, 2015, the band was part of the line-up at the Pinkpop Festival.

On June 22, 2015, Magic! was awarded the International Achievement Award by SOCAN at the 2015 SOCAN Awards in Toronto.

On July 1, 2015, Magic! performed at Canada Day in Ottawa, and later performed at the Coca-Cola Stage at the Calgary Stampede on July 12, 2015.

On July 17, 2015, Magic! released a new single, "#SundayFunday"; this ended up being a non-album single.

=== 2016–2017: Primary Colours ===
On March 25, 2016, Magic! released their first single from their second album Primary Colours, called "Lay You Down Easy", this was a collaboration with Sean Paul.

On the evening of June 18, 2016, Magic! released their second single from Primary Colours called "Red Dress". The song was premiered on Apple's radio station Beats1. The band first heard the song premiered as they were broadcasting a Facebook live video to their fans.

On the morning of June 20, 2016, Magic! was part of the Muscular Dystrophy Association's #LiveUnlimited, they broadcast a live rehearsal video to Facebook to raise money for MDA.

The album Primary Colours was released on July 1, 2016.

On July 2, Magic! released a special version of their song "No Regrets" in memory of the victims of the shooting on June 12, 2016, at Pulse Nightclub in Orlando, Florida.

On March 10, 2017, they released a new collaboration with Matoma and D.R.A.M. called "Girl at Coachella" on digital and streaming services.

=== 2017–present: Expectations and Inner Love Energy ===
In October 2017, they premiered their new single "Darts in the Dark." After some touring, they released a new single called "Kiss Me" on June 8, 2018. Their third studio album Expectations was released in September 2018.

The band went on hiatus between 2020 and 2022. On 7 September 2021, drummer Alex Tanas announced his departure from the band. In March 2022, the band announced the release of their future album Inner Love Energy.

In September 2022, they released their first single since 2018 called "Aint Got Nothin' Figured Out" followed by "Inner Love Energy" two months later. Their fourth studio album Inner Love Energy was released in April 2024.

=== Collaborations ===
Magic! is featured on Shakira's "Cut Me Deep", a track from her self-titled album, released in March 2014 and on a track on One Love, One Rhythm, the official 2014 FIFA World Cup album titled "This Is Our Time (Agora é a Nossa Hora)" released in April. They are also featured on "Sun Goes Down", a track on David Guetta's album Listen, which also features Sonny Wilson on the hook, as well as production from Showtek.

== Band members ==
- Nasri – lead vocals, guitars, piano (2012–present)
- Mark "Pelli" Pellizzer – guitars, keyboards, backing vocals (2012–present)
- Ben Spivak – bass guitar, keyboards, backing vocals (2013–present)

=== Former ===
- Alex Tanas – drums, percussion, backing vocals (2012–2021)

== Discography ==
=== Studio albums ===
Title	Album details	Peak chart positions							Sales
Title	Album details	CAN	AUS	JPN	NZ	SWE	UK	US	Sales
Don't Kill the Magic	Released: June 30, 2014; Label: Sony Music Entertainment; Formats: CD, LP, digital download	5	66	70	30	25	19	6	CAN: 15,500; US: 156,000
Primary Colours	Released: July 1, 2016; Label: Sony Music Entertainment; Formats: CD, LP, digital download	19	—	114	—	—	—	124	
Expectations	Released: September 7, 2018; Label: Sony Music Entertainment; Formats: CD, digital download	—	—	—	—	—	—	—	
Inner Love Energy	Released: April 5, 2024; Label: Independent, ONErpm; Formats: CD, digital download	—	—	—	—	—	—	—	
"—" denotes a recording that did not chart or was not released in that territory.

=== Singles ===
Title	Year	Peak chart positions											Certifications	Album
Title	Year	CAN	AUS	AUT	DEN	GER	JPN	NLD	NZ	SWE	UK	US	Certifications	Album
"Rude"	2013	6	2	3	3	7	4	5	2	2	1	1	MC: 5× Platinum; ARIA: 5× Platinum; BPI: 3× Platinum; BVMI: Gold; GLF: 3× Platinum; IFPI DEN: 3× Platinum; RMNZ: 6× Platinum; RIAA: Diamond	Don't Kill the Magic
"Don't Kill the Magic"	2014	22	53	—	—	—	—	—	—	—	—	—		Don't Kill the Magic
"Let Your Hair Down"	2014	20	—	—	—	—	—	—	—	—	—	—	MC: Platinum	Don't Kill the Magic
"No Way No"	2015	23	—	—	—	—	—	—	—	—	—	—	MC: Gold	Don't Kill the Magic
"#SundayFunday"	2015	72	—	—	—	—	—	—	—	—	—	—		Non-album single
"Lay You Down Easy" (featuring Sean Paul)	2016	36	91	—	—	—	51	—	—	—	—	—	MC: Platinum	Primary Colours
"Red Dress"	2016	—	—	—	—	—	—	—	—	—	—	—		Primary Colours
"No Regrets"	2016	—	—	—	—	—	—	—	—	—	—	—		Primary Colours
"Girl at Coachella" (with Matoma featuring DRAM)	2017	—	—	—	—	—	—	—	—	—	—	—		Non-album single
"Darts in the Dark"	2017	—	—	—	—	—	—	—	—	—	—	—		Expectations
"Kiss Me"	2018	—	—	—	—	—	—	—	—	—	—	—		Expectations
"Expectations"	2018	—	—	—	—	—	—	—	—	—	—	—		Expectations
"Ain't Got Nothin' Figured Out"	2022	—	—	—	—	—	—	—	—	—	—	—		Non-album single
"Inner Love Energy"	2022	—	—	—	—	—	—	—	—	—	—	—		Inner Love Energy
"Ballerina"	2022	—	—	—	—	—	—	—	—	—	—	—		Inner Love Energy
"Good Feeling"	2024	—	—	—	—	—	—	—	—	—	—	—		Inner Love Energy
"Sunflower Fields"	2024	—	—	—	—	—	—	—	—	—	—	—		Inner Love Energy
"—" denotes a recording that did not chart or was not released in that territory.

==== As a featured artist ====
Title	Year	Peak chart positions				Album
Title	Year	BEL (FL) Tip	BEL (WA) Tip	FRA	GER	Album
"Sun Goes Down" (David Guetta and Showtek featuring Magic! and Sonny Wilson)	2015	16	2	37	67	Listen

==== Other appearances ====
Title	Year	Other artist(s)	Album
"Cut Me Deep"	2014	Shakira	Shakira
"This Is Our Time (Agora É a Nossa Hora)"	2014	—N/a	One Love, One Rhythm – The 2014 FIFA World Cup Official Album
"What We Said"	2017	Shakira	El Dorado

== Awards and nominations ==
Year	Award	Nominated work	Category	Result
2014	MuchMusic Video Awards	"Rude"	International Video of the Year by a Canadian	Nominated
2014	Teen Choice Awards	"Rude"	Choice Music: Song Group	Nominated
2014	Teen Choice Awards	"Rude"	Choice Summer Song	Nominated
2014	Teen Choice Awards	MAGIC!	Choice Summer Group	Nominated
2014	American Music Awards	"Rude"	Single of the Year	Nominated
2015	Juno Awards	MAGIC!	Breakthrough Group of the Year	Won
2015	Juno Awards	MAGIC!	Fan Choice Award	Nominated
2015	Juno Awards	MAGIC!	Songwriter of the Year	Nominated
2015	Juno Awards	"Rude"	Single of the Year	Won
2015	Juno Awards	Don't Kill the Magic	Pop Album of the Year	Nominated
2015	Billboard Music Awards	MAGIC!	Top Duo/Group	Nominated
2015	Billboard Music Awards	"Rude"	Top Radio Song	Nominated
2015	The SOCAN Awards	MAGIC!	International Achievement Award	Won

== Notes ==
There has been at least one significant remix of "Rude". A remix by Russian-born German producer/DJ Zedd was premiered in his set at Lollapalooza 2014. It was released on 2 September 2014, Zedd's 25th birthday. Zedd had said, "I'm gonna give myself a birthday present and release my remix of 'Rude' on my bday, sept 2nd!" He also released official, completed full-length audio on his SoundCloud on 28 August 2014, which garnered nearly 400,000 plays within 24 hours. While the original was still in number-one position on the Billboard Hot 100, there was speculation that release of the remix on mainstream music outlets online would assist the original song in maintaining its position on the chart.
