= Graffiti (Chris Brown album) =

- Standard cover. Deluxe cover has a golden background.

Studio album by Chris Brown
- Released: December 8, 2009
- Recorded: 2008–09
- Studios: The Compound (Orlando, Florida); The Record Plant (Los Angeles, California); No Excuses (Santa Monica, California); Chalice (Hollywood, California)
- Genres: R&B; synth pop; rock; Eurodisco; Euro-rap
- Length: 51:50
- Labels: Jive; CBE
- Producers: Swizz Beatz; Polow Da Don; Ester Dean; the Messengers; Brian Kennedy; Eric Prydz; the Runners; The Co-Captains; Ryan Leslie; Tha Bizness; Scott Storch

Chris Brown chronology
| Exclusive (2007) | Graffiti (2009) | F.A.M.E. (2011) |

Singles from Graffiti
- 1. "I Can Transform Ya" Released: September 29, 2009; 2. "Crawl" Released: November 23, 2009

Graffiti is the third studio album by American singer Chris Brown. It was released on December 8, 2009, by Jive Records. The album serves as a follow-up to his previous album Exclusive (2007). Recording sessions took place from 2008 to 2009, with several record producers, including Polow da Don, Swizz Beatz, the Runners and Brian Kennedy, among others.

Primarily an R&B outing blended with synthpop and rock, Graffiti incorporates elements of hip hop and Eurodisco, with its production showing a heavy usage of synthesizers. With this album, Brown sought to expand his musical boundaries beyond the genres of his earlier works. Its lyrical content has been characterized as multifaceted, exploring themes that range from remorse and regret to desire, affection, and the hedonistic allure of a playboy lifestyle.

The album debuted at number seven on the US Billboard 200, selling 102,000 copies in its first week. The album became his third consecutive top-ten debut in the United States following Exclusive in 2007, while producing two singles that has achieved moderate chart success. Released months after Brown committed felony assault against his then-girlfriend Rihanna, Graffiti was considered to be a critical and commercial failure compared to the singer's previous works. In 2019, it was certified Gold by the Recording Industry Association of America (RIAA).

Despite receiving generally negative reviews from most music critics, Graffiti was nominated for two Grammy Awards; including one for the Best Contemporary R&B Album and the other for the Best R&B Performance by a Duo or Group with Vocals for the track, "Take My Time" featuring Tank.

== Background ==
In 2008, Chris Brown began working on his third studio album and confirmed the title, Graffiti, at the 2008 American Music Awards. In 2008 he said that with this album he wanted to experiment with a different musical direction inspired by singers Prince and Michael Jackson. He stated, "I wanted to change it up and really be different. Like my style nowadays, I don't try to be typical urban. I want to be like how Prince, Michael and Stevie Wonder were. They can cross over to any genre of music".

With Graffiti, Brown took complete control of his artistry, overseeing the entire artistic direction and writing every song himself, except for "I'll Go," which was written and produced by Brian Kennedy and James Fauntleroy. Brown said in a 2014 interview that this choice came from the fact that he wanted to give "[his] own perspective of the music [he] wanted to make" and by his wanting to "verbalize whatever [he] was going through". Following Brown's violent assault on his then-girlfriend Rihanna on February 8, 2009, Brown decided to express his emotional state after the incident on a significant portion of the album.

Recording for the album primarily took place in Orlando and on September 5, 2009, via Twitter, Brown announced that he had completed the album, and also revealed that the album would be released outside of the US on December 7 and in the US on December 8. Speaking to MTV, producer Swizz Beatz revealed, "he's got something to prove," and that for the album Brown "has worked on 60–70 songs."

== Composition ==
"Sing Like Me"
A sample of the slow-jam "Sing Like Me", featuring Brown's sexual lyrics over Asian-influenced strings and 808 drums.

The album's musical style is made by mixtures of R&B, synth pop, rock and Euro-disco. Critics noted that with the album's sound Brown aimed to expand his music beyond the genres of his previous works. Greg Kot of Chicago Tribune said that Brown "borrows from the cross-genre experiments of Kanye West, Saul Williams, and Lil Wayne." According to Mikael Wood of Los Angeles Times, the album is made of an "upbeat" part, that "can be considered the sonic sequel to "Forever"", mixed with power ballads, observed to express his remorse and feelings following his violent assault on Rihanna.

Lead single and album's opener "I Can Transform Ya", lyrically is about introducing someone to a luxurious life, has a robotic synth rock groove, characterized by a heavy use of synthesizers and guitar riffs. "Pass Out" featuring Eva Simons, a Eurodisco song, samples the "Call on me" on Steve Winwood's "Valerie", which was also used in Eric Prydz worldwide dance hit, "Call on Me". The song has been compared to Lady Gaga's works. "Sing Like Me" and "Take My Time" recall Brown's earlier R&B works in a more sexually oriented way. "Fallin' Down is a goth rock and synthpop song, that features lyrics about Brown falling in depression. The uptempo electro-hop "Wait", with The Game and R&B singer Trey Songz, features "bouncy sirens", and according to Jon Caramanica of The New York Times is closest to capturing the "frenetic energy" of Brown's early singles. The song has been described as a sexual braggadocio record. According to Dan Gennoe of Yahoo! Music UK, "I.Y.A" is a tribute to 80's music, and the song has been compared to Blake Lewis' "Heartbreak on Vinyl".

"So Cold" has been described as a "piano-laden apology" as "Famous Girl" has been called a "heavy hearted dance track." The previous track as well as "Crawl" feature an apologetic Brown, pining at points. The previous has been described to bear a sonic resemblance to Madonna's "Drowned World/Substitute for Love." The latter, "Famous Girl", features new wave influences and a bouncy, light melodic line. The song references songs such as Drake's "Best I Ever Had", Keri Hilson's "Knock You Down", Keyshia Cole's "Heaven Sent", Beyoncé's "Halo", and Jazmine Sullivan's "Bust Your Windows", as well as Rihanna's "Disturbia" and his "Forever". "Take My Time" is an R&B slow jam that features American singer Tank, and has slow drums, and heavy female breathing, prompting innuendo. Jon Caramanica of The New York Times said that "Lucky Me", lyrically about downs of life in the limelight, has a melody reminiscent of Michael Jackson's "Man in the Mirror". The song is an acoustic R&B and pop record that features minor influences of African music. "Girlfriend" is a synth rock song featuring Lupe Fiasco. The album's standard edition ends with the track "I'll Go", a soft rock track where the singer "tells the story of a lost love" and his determination to do anything for his loved one, including leaving her if that could make her happier.

== Release and promotion ==
=== Walmart controversy ===
The week of the album's release, Brown took to his Twitter page to express his extreme displeasure with stores not visibly stocking the album, including a Walmart in Wallingford, Connecticut, stating: "The[y] didn't even have my album in the back... not on shelves, saw for myself, im tired of this shit. major stores [are] blackballing my cd. [They are] not stockin the shelves and lying to costumers. [sic] what the fuck do i gotta do. im not biting my tongue about shit else... the industry can kiss my ass. WTF... yeah i said it and i aint retracting shit... we talked to the managers and the[y] didn't even know anything. wow!!! but they had Alicia Keys album ready for release for this Tuesday comin ... the manager told me that when there are new releases its mandatory to put em on the shelves.. BUT NO SIGN OF #GRAFFITI. BS. no disprespect [sic] to alicia at all, just givin an example to whos album is loaded and ready to go next week".

=== Packaging and cover art ===
The album was released internationally on December 7, 2009, and in the US on December 8, 2009. It was released on all major formats and, in addition to the standard edition, an extended deluxe edition was also released, containing an additional six songs. The international edition differs slightly from the US edition, with one extra song ("Girlfriend") appearing on the standard edition and another ("Chase Our Love") appearing on the deluxe extended edition with the inclusion of track ("Movie") omitted. The European deluxe edition was issued as a single-CD, while US and Japanese deluxe editions are two-disc sets. The album cover displays Brown with robotic hands, wearing black clothing and sunglasses, holding a guitar over his shoulder, and spray-painting the album title, which is written in a font similar to that of Purple Rain by Prince and the Revolution. To promote the album, Brown embarked on the "Fan Appreciation Tour" on October 27, 2009, in New Jersey. The tour took place in the US. The tour ended on December 15, 2009, in New York and a portion of the proceeds from the tour went to charity to help the victims of domestic violence as well as people with developmental disabilities.

== Singles ==
"I Can Transform Ya" was released as the album's lead single on September 29, 2009. The song received mostly positive reviews, noting the song's club feel and catchiness. "I Can Transform Ya"'s reached the top ten of New Zealand, whilst achieving chart success in Australia, the United Kingdom and the United States. The song's dance-heavy accompanying music video features choreography with hooded ninjas, and makes puns on the Transformers series. "Crawl" and "Sing Like Me" were released on iTunes on November 24, 2009, the first as the album's second single, and the latter as a promotional single. The previous received positive to mixed reviews, reaching the top twenty in Japan and New Zealand. Its accompanying music video features Brown and American R&B singer Cassie as his love interest, as he yearns for their relationship on a winter night in a city and in a desert scene. The song "Pass Out" was planned to be the third single for the album, but was not released. Brown also declined to specify whether the single, "Famous Girl", was in relation to Rihanna.

== Critical reception ==
Professional ratings
Aggregate scores
| Source | Rating |
|---|---|
| Metacritic | 39/100 |
Review scores
| Source | Rating |
| AllMusic | 1/5 stars |
| Billboard | 4/5 stars |
| The A.V. Club | F |
| Chicago Tribune | 2/4 medals |
| Entertainment Weekly | B− |
| Los Angeles Times | 1.5/4 stars |
| The New York Times | mixed |
| Rolling Stone | 2.5/5 stars |
| Slant Magazine | 1.5/5 stars |
| Spin | 3.5/5 stars |
| The Times | 2/5 stars |

Graffiti received negative reviews from most music critics. At Metacritic, which assigns a normalized rating out of 100 to reviews from mainstream critics, the album received an average score of 39, based on 12 reviews, which indicates "generally unfavorable reviews". It is the lowest-rated album of 2009 on Metacritic.

Steve Jones of USA Today gave the album two-and-a-half out of four stars and commented that Brown "succeeds in expanding his sonic horizons with rock and Euro-dance influenced rhythms that are sure to ignite dance floors and innervate his electrifying performances". Billboard's Gail Mitchell complimented its music as "a forward-moving fusion of R&B, pop, rock and Euro-dance". Thomas Golianpoulous of Spin said Brown sounded "remorseful", ending the review by saying "The album's most striking moment is 'Fallin' Down.' Over an ominous guitar riff, the 20-year-old sings, 'It's getting heavy / I think I'm getting ready to break down.' It's the most honest moment of his short career. The kid sure needs a vacation." Despite writing that it has filler tracks, Dan Gennoe of Yahoo! Music gave the album a seven out of 10 rating and called it the "highest point of his career". Chicago Tribune writer Greg Kot noted an "inconsistent and sometimes contradictory tone" in Brown's lyrics, but commented that the album has "several top-notch pieces of innocuous dance music". Leah Greenblatt of Entertainment Weekly complimented its "zero-gravity pleasures", writing that "at its best moments, it still floats". Sarah Rodman of The Boston Globe commended the music and production, but criticized Brown's songwriting. Joey Guerra of the Houston Chronicle said the album might have worked, but much of it "never takes flight, instead recycling the usual slick touches and arrangements." BBC Online's Jude Rogers noted "slinky RnB body-poppers and cheesy, breathy ballads" and commented that "plodding melodies draw attention to Brown's unpleasantly macho style". HipHopDX wrote: "It is clear that he is evolving as an artist and hopefully a man, and Graffiti may be the bridge between where he was and where he is going".

Rolling Stone writer Jody Rosen expressed a mixed response towards its "punchy dance-pop songs full of club-ready beats and Casanova gestures", calling it "a bland, occasionally obnoxious, pro forma R&B album". Slant Magazine's Eric Henderson commented that "the only compelling thing about the incoherent Graffiti is the material (both external and internal) that makes it even less palatable than a simply below-average collection of paint-by-numbers R&B beats." Michaelangelo Matos of The A.V. Club gave the album an F rating and stated "The production is clean and often lively, and Brown sings well enough. The problem is what he's singing". AllMusic editor Andy Kellman also dismissed the album's songwriting and called Brown "exceptionally insufferable" on most of the songs. Chicago Sun-Times writer Jim DeRogatis gave the album one out of four stars and described it as "thoroughly mediocre". Pete Paphides of The Times panned its ballads, called them a "slopfest of mawkish penitence". Jon Caramanica of The New York Times questioned the lyrics' substance and called Graffiti "a curiously faceless album that largely thumbs its nose at close reading".

=== Awards and nominations ===
Awards and nominations for Graffiti
| Year | Ceremony | Category | Result | Ref. |
|---|---|---|---|---|
| 2011 | Grammy Awards | Best Contemporary R&B Album | Nominated | |

== Commercial performance ==
The album debuted at number seven on the US Billboard 200, selling 102,000 copies in its first week. Graffiti was the week's second highest debut, only behind Glee: The Music, Volume 2. To date, the album has sold 341,000 copies in the United States. The sales fell short compared to his previous two albums, but it was still certified Gold by the RIAA nearly ten years later, on August 23, 2019.

== Track listing ==
Standard edition
| No. | Title | Writer(s) | Producer(s) | Length |
|---|---|---|---|---|
| 1. | "I Can Transform Ya" (featuring Lil Wayne and Swizz Beatz) | Christopher Brown; Jason Boyd; Kasseem Dean; Dwayne Carter | Swizz Beatz | 3:48 |
| 2. | "Sing Like Me" | Brown; Atozzio Towns | Bigg Makk; Keith Thomas; Lorenza "Big Lo" Lennon | 4:15 |
| 3. | "Crawl" | Brown; Nasri Atweh; Luke Boyd | The Messengers | 3:56 |
| 4. | "So Cold" | Brown; Ester Dean; Teyana Taylor | Polow da Don | 3:38 |
| 5. | "What I Do" (featuring Plies) | Brown; Kevin Cossom; Algernod Washington | The Runners | 4:00 |
| 6. | "Famous Girl" | Brown | Leslie | 3:39 |
| 7. | "Take My Time" (featuring Tank) | Brown; James Fauntleroy | Tha Bizness | 4:38 |
| 8. | "I.Y.A" | Brown; Ryan Buendia | Nick Marsh | 3:08 |
| 9. | "Pass Out" (featuring Eva Simons) | Brown; Andre Merritt | Brian Kennedy | 3:53 |
| 10. | "Wait" (featuring Trey Songz and The Game) | Brown; Tremaine Neverson; Jayceon Taylor | Polow da Don | 4:30 |
| 11. | "Lucky Me" | Brown; Theron Thomas; Timothy Thomas; Richard Butler Jr. | The Co-Captains | 5:10 |
| 12. | "Fallin Down" | Brown | Bereal | 4:12 |
| 13. | "I'll Go" | Brian Kennedy; Fauntleroy | Kennedy; Fauntleroy | 3:05 |

Deluxe edition bonus tracks
| No. | Title | Writer(s) | Producer(s) | Length |
|---|---|---|---|---|
| 14. | "Gotta Be Ur Man" | Brown; Dawson; Dean; Jay Stevenson | Polow da Don | 3:17 |
| 15. | "Movie" | Brown; Hill; Timothy Thomas; Theron Thomas | Polow da Don; The Co-Captains | 4:04 |
| 16. | "For Ur Love" | Brown; Buendia | Nick Marsh | 3:45 |
| 17. | "I Need This" | Jessica Cornish; Allen | Oak | 4:21 |
| 18. | "I Love U" (featuring Ester Dean) | Brown; Dean; Perry | Polow da Don | 3:02 |
| 19. | "Brown Skin Girl" (featuring Sean Paul and Rock City) | Brown; Timothy Thomas; Theron Thomas | Scott Storch | 4:13 |

International standard edition bonus track
| No. | Title | Writer(s) | Producer(s) | Length |
|---|---|---|---|---|
| 14. | "Girlfriend" (featuring Lupe Fiasco) | Brown; Buendia; Wasalu Muhammad Jaco | Free School | 4:08 |

International deluxe edition bonus tracks
| No. | Title | Writer(s) | Producer(s) | Length |
|---|---|---|---|---|
| 15. | "Gotta Be Ur Man" | Brown; Dawson; Dean; Stevenson | Polow da Don | 3:17 |
| 16. | "For Ur Love" | Brown; Buendia | Nick Marsh | 3:45 |
| 17. | "I Need This" | Cornish; Allen | Oak | 4:21 |
| 18. | "I Love U" (featuring Ester Dean) | Brown; Dean; Perry | Polow da Don | 3:02 |
| 19. | "Brown Skin Girl" (featuring Sean Paul and Rock City) | Brown; Timothy Thomas; Theron Thomas | Storch | 4:13 |
| 20. | "Chase Our Love" | Brown; Buendia | Nick Marsh | 3:21 |

iTunes pre-order and streaming version bonus track
| No. | Title | Writer(s) | Producer(s) | Length |
|---|---|---|---|---|
| 21. | "Graffiti" | Brown; Carlos Battey; Steven Battey | Cool & Dre | 5:12 |

Japan deluxe edition bonus disc
| No. | Title | Writer(s) | Producer(s) | Length |
|---|---|---|---|---|
| 14. | "Gotta Be Ur Man" | Brown; Dawson; Dean; Stevenson | Polow da Don | 3:17 |
| 15. | "Movie" | Brown; Hill; Timothy Thomas; Theron Thomas | Polow da Don; The Co-Captains | 4:04 |
| 16. | "For Ur Love" | Brown; Buendia | Nick Marsh | 3:45 |
| 17. | "I Need This" | Cornish; Allen | Oak | 4:21 |
| 18. | "I Love U" (featuring Ester Dean) | Brown; Dean; Perry | Polow da Don | 3:02 |
| 19. | "Brown Skin Girl" (featuring Sean Paul and Rock City) | Brown; Timothy Thomas; Theron Thomas | Storch | 4:13 |
| 20. | "Girlfriend" (featuring Lupe Fiasco) | Brown; Buendia; Wasalu Muhammad Jaco | Free School | 4:08 |
| 21. | "Go Away" | Brown; Boyd; Buendia | Free School | 3:48 |
| 22. | "They Say" | Brown | Free School | 4:40 |

Notes

- "What I Do" features uncredited vocals by DJ Khaled.

Sample credits

- "Pass Out" contains a sample of "Call on Me" performed by Eric Prydz.
- "Movie" contains replayed elements of "Can You Stand the Rain" performed by New Edition.
- ”For Ur Love” contains a sample of “Learning To Fly” by Tom Petty and the Heartbreakers.
- "Brown Skin Girl" contains replayed elements from "You're the Inspiration" by Chicago.

== Charts ==
=== Weekly charts ===
Weekly chart performance for Graffiti
| Chart (2009–2010) | Peak position |
|---|---|
| Australian Albums (ARIA) | 40 |
| Australian Urban Albums (ARIA) | 3 |
| Belgian Albums (Ultratop Flanders) | 99 |
| Canadian Albums (Nielsen SoundScan) | 84 |
| Dutch Albums (Album Top 100) | 83 |
| French Albums (SNEP) | 134 |
| Irish Albums (IRMA) | 47 |
| Japanese Albums (Oricon) | 47 |
| New Zealand Albums (RMNZ) | 40 |
| Scottish Albums (Official Charts) | 70 |
| South Korean Albums (Circle) | 97 |
| UK Albums (Official Charts) | 55 |
| UK R&B Albums (Official Charts) | 11 |
| US Billboard 200 | 7 |
| US Top R&B/Hip-Hop Albums (Billboard) | 1 |

=== Year-end charts ===
2009 year-end chart performance for Graffiti
| Chart (2009) | Position |
|---|---|
| Australian Urban Albums (ARIA) | 39 |

2010 year-end chart performance for Graffiti
| Chart (2010) | Position |
|---|---|
| Australian Urban Albums (ARIA) | 33 |
| US Billboard 200 | 113 |
| US Top R&B/Hip-Hop Albums (Billboard) | 28 |

== Certifications ==
Certifications for Graffiti
| Region | Certification | Certified units/sales |
|---|---|---|
| New Zealand (RMNZ) | Gold | 7,500^{‡} |
| United Kingdom (BPI) | Silver | 60,000^{*} |
| United States (RIAA) | Gold | 500,000^{‡} |
^{*} Sales figures based on certification alone.^{‡} Sales+streaming figures based on certification alone.

== Release history ==
Release dates for Graffiti
| Country | Date |
|---|---|
| Germany | December 7, 2009 |
| United Kingdom | December 7, 2009 |
| United States | December 8, 2009 |
