= Lay You Down Easy =

Single by Magic! featuring Sean Paul

from the album Primary Colours
- Released: March 24, 2016
- Genre: Reggae fusion
- Length: 2:44
- Label: RCA
- Songwriters: Sean Paul Henriques; Nasri Atweh; Adam Messinger; Mark Pellizzer; Alex Tanas; Ben Spivak
- Producers: Adam Messinger; Alex Tanas

Magic! singles chronology
"Sun Goes Down" (2015)	"Lay You Down Easy" (2016)	"Red Dress" (2016)

Sean Paul singles chronology
"Cheap Thrills" (2016)	"Lay You Down Easy" (2016)	"Hair" (2016)

Music video
- "Lay You Down Easy" (Studio Version) on YouTube

"Lay You Down Easy" is a song recorded by Canadian reggae fusion band Magic! featuring Sean Paul for their second studio album, Primary Colours (2016). On March 24, 2016, the song was issued to Digital download by RCA Records as the first single from the album.

== Music video ==
The music video for "Lay You Down Easy" was uploaded to the band's official Vevo channel on March 25, 2016.

== Charts ==
Chart (2016)	Peak position
Argentina (Monitor Latino)	13
Australia (ARIA)	91
Brazil (Billboard Hot 100 Brasil)	2
Canada Hot 100 (Billboard)	36
Canada AC (Billboard)	8
Canada CHR/Top 40 (Billboard)	11
Canada Hot AC (Billboard)	3
Japan Hot 100 (Billboard)	51
Poland (Polish Airplay Top 100)	9
US Adult Pop Airplay (Billboard)	40
US Reggae Digital Songs (Billboard)	1

=== Year-end charts ===
Chart (2016)	Position
Argentina (Monitor Latino)	86
Brazil (Brasil Hot 100)	44
Canada (Canadian Hot 100)	90

== Certifications ==
Region	Certification	Certified units/sales
Canada (Music Canada)	Platinum	80,000^{‡}
Poland (ZPAV)	Gold	10,000^{‡}
^{‡} Sales+streaming figures based on certification alone.
