= Let Your Hair Down (Magic! song) =

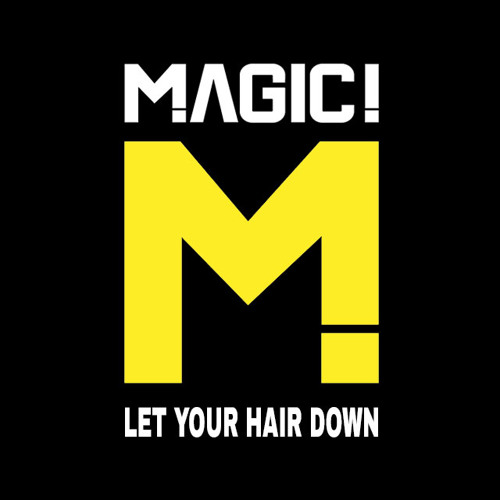

Single by Magic!

from the album Don't Kill the Magic
- Released: October 7, 2014
- Genre: Reggae fusion
- Length: 4:25
- Label: RCA
- Songwriter(s): Nasri Atweh; Adam Messinger; Alex Tanas
- Producer(s): Messinger; Atweh; Mark Pellizzer; Tanas

Magic! singles chronology
"Don't Kill the Magic" (2014)	"Let Your Hair Down" (2014)	"No Way No" (2015)

Music video
- "Let Your Hair Down" on YouTube

"Let Your Hair Down" is a song recorded by Canadian reggae fusion band Magic! for their debut studio album, Don't Kill the Magic (2014). It was written by Adam Messinger with group members Nasri Atweh and Alex Tanas, and was produced by Messinger, Atweh, Tanas and Magic! guitarist Mark Pellizzer. On October 7, 2014 the song was issued to contemporary hit radio by RCA Records as the third single from the album, and second to be released in the US.

== Music video ==
A lyric video for "Let Your Hair Down" was uploaded to the band's official Vevo channel on August 20, 2014. The official music video, directed by David Rousseau, features the band on a beach at sunset and premiered October 31, 2014.

== Chart performance ==
=== Weekly charts ===
Chart (2014–15)	Peak position
Canada (Canadian Hot 100)	20
Canada AC (Billboard)	6
Canada CHR/Top 40 (Billboard)	11
Canada Hot AC (Billboard)	6
US Adult Pop Airplay (Billboard)	35

=== Year-end chart ===
Chart (2015)	Position
Canada (Canadian Hot 100)	91

== Release history ==
Country	Date	Format	Label
United States	October 7, 2014	Contemporary hit radio	RCA Records
United States	October 27, 2014	Hot adult contemporary	RCA Records
Canada	November 17, 2014	Hot adult contemporary	RCA Records
