= I Can Transform Ya =

Single by Chris Brown featuring Lil Wayne and Swizz Beatz

from the album Graffiti
- Released: September 29, 2009
- Recorded: 2009
- Studio: The Compound (Orlando, Florida)
- Genre: Rap rock; crunk
- Length: 3:49
- Label: Jive
- Songwriters: Chris Brown; Dwayne Carter; Kasseem Dean; Trayce Green; Joseph Bereal; Jason Boyd
- Producer: Swizz Beatz

Chris Brown singles chronology
| "Drop It Low" (2009) | "I Can Transform Ya" (2009) | "Crawl" (2009) |

Lil Wayne singles chronology
| "Money to Blow" (2009) | "I Can Transform Ya" (2009) | "Give It Up to Me" (2009) |

Swizz Beatz singles chronology
| "I Do" (2009) | "I Can Transform Ya" (2009) | "On to the Next One" (2009) |

Music video
- "I Can Transform Ya" on YouTube

"I Can Transform Ya" is a song by American singer Chris Brown from his third album Graffiti. The song features American rapper Lil Wayne and American producer Swizz Beatz. The artists co-wrote the song with Lonny Bereal, Trayce Green, and Jason "Poo Bear" Boyd, with Beatz producing the track. The song was released as the lead single from Graffiti on September 29, 2009, and was Brown's first official release since his altercation with former girlfriend, Barbadian singer Rihanna. Originally known simply as "Transformer", it is an electro-composed song infused with hip hop, crunk and "industrial" R&B musical genres, while making use of robotic tones. It is lyrically about introducing someone to a life of luxury.

"I Can Transform Ya" received mostly positive reviews, noting the song's club feel and catchiness. The song peaked the highest in New Zealand, at number seven, and was also certified platinum in the country. It peaked in the top twenty of the United States, at twenty-one in Australia and Ireland. The song also charted in the top thirty in the United Kingdom, becoming a top ten hit on the UK R&B Chart. The dance-heavy accompanying music video, coined a "shiny, sexy, throwback" features choreography with hooded ninjas, and makes puns on the Transformers franchise.

== Background ==
The song was originally titled "Transformer" according to producer and featured guest Swizz Beatz in a September 2009 interview with MTV News. The song was set to be the first real record that Brown had released since his highly publicized domestic violence case against then-girlfriend Rihanna at the beginning of the year. Another song "Changed Man", an "apologetic ode to Rihanna" written by Brown, and several other tracks were leaked but Jive Records said the material was old. Swizz Beatz said that Brown had recorded "60 or 70" songs for the album, and that "He's got something to prove." Beatz also commented on Lil Wayne's contribution to the song, saying, ""The Wayne part is just nothing to talk about, He really showed his ass on this one. It's probably the best feature verse since the 'It's Me [Bitches]' remix. He really went in on the 'Transformer' joint." It was originally supposed released on September 30, 2009, but Brown stated on his Twitter that the song would be released a day early on September 29, 2009.

== Composition ==
"I Can Transform Ya"
A sample of "I Can Transform Ya", featuring hip-hop drums with guitar riffs, described as having a "robotic crunk" sound.

The song, influenced by hip-hop, has been described as an "upbeat tune", is composed of pounding drums, and features referee whistles and hand claps. It also has synthpop elements, featuring a "synthesized guitar riff." Mikael Wood of the Los Angeles Times says the song has a robo-crunk groove. According to James Montgomery of MTV News, the song is an "adult club track". Greg Kot of the Chicago Tribune said that the song is one of the album tracks featuring an "aggressive stance" and "club banger" that would "sound fantastic on the dancefloor". The song is lyrically about introducing someone new to a luxurious life. The song makes references to the Transformers franchise.

== Music video ==
=== Background ===
The song's music video was directed by Joseph Kahn. Kahn, who also directed the video for Brown and Ester Dean's "Drop It Low", said that Brown played him tracks from his album on the set, and had a clear idea of what he wanted for the "I Can Transform Ya" video. Kahn said,

"...obviously, him going in there and dancing and turning into cars and trucks is right up my alley. His interests, in terms of kung fu and special effects and science fiction and all the boy-culture stuff, it falls directly in line with what I like. "His talent is phenomenal. I'm still struggling to try and capture that talent on film, and it's a challenge. Here's a guy who can literally do anything. If you watch this thing, he's doing nunchuck tricks, and I'm a huge kung fu aficionado, and they're mind-blowing. I've never seen stuff like that before in kung fu flicks. I would say it's like a pure aesthetic dance video from the very fiber of it. Everything dances onscreen. Everything has movement. Everything has a certain mechanical rhythm. He actually created a dance style for this that is mechanical. It's sort of a hyper-intense version of the robot. Even the transformations go directly in line with the movements."

Kahn also said that instead of taking the song's lyrics and being "pretentious" about it, he wanted to show the audience exactly what Brown was singing about, commenting, "What if we just got ambitious and demonstrated the lyrics? The trick is to do it in a creative way. Let's try to display the lyrics and the feeling of the dance at the same time." In October 2009, Brown released screencaps for the video, coincidentally the same day Rihanna released her video for "Russian Roulette". The photos showed several scenes, including Brown in the middle of a squadron of black storm troopers, Brown in a gray suit, and him giving a karate kick in mid-air. Another was also of Brown, Wayne and Swizz Beatz standing confidently against a white backdrop.

=== Synopsis and reception ===
Brown wearing an unzipped black hooded jacket, spray painting the title of the song

The video premiered on MTV Networks on October 27, 2009. The music video opens with Brown transforming from a black sports car, and spray painting the name of the single onto the screen, indirectly referencing his forthcoming album Graffiti. The video, set entirely on an all-white backdrop, focuses on Brown's dance moves, as Brown performs alongside hooded ninjas. Several other "transformations" are made in the video including from motorcycles and helicopters. Swizz Beatz appears in the clip, as well as Lil Wayne, playing an electric guitar. Transformers star Tyrese Gibson makes a cameo appearance.

Jocelyn Vena of MTV News described the video as "glossy" and "fast-paced". James Montgomery of MTV News called the video a "shiny, sexy throwback". Montgomery also said, "It's a blockbuster, loaded with eye-popping special effects — the titular transformations are particularly great looking, as are the scene-to-scene transitions — and frighteningly precise pop-and-lock moves from Brown himself." Leah Greenblatt of Entertainment Weekly said the clip was "snazzy-looking", but commented, "it feels … kind of gross." BET's Sound Off Blog said, "the visual embodies exactly what the title represents- transforming into abnormal objects while doing splits and showing off some several thick wasted PYT’s." The video's choreography and dancers resembling "cyber ninjas" also drew comparisons to Janet Jackson's "Feedback" by several critics.

== Critical reception ==
The song received generally positive reviews. Greg Kot of Chicago Tribune gave the song a positive review, calling it a "club banger". Thomas Gonlianpoulous of Spin commended Swizz Beatz' "bombastic production", Wayne's "energetic yet nonsensical rap", and Brown's "joyful, brisk vocals." Dan Gennoe of Yahoo! Music UK said the song, serving as lead single, says "Brown's promise for the future is to be an altogether more interesting kind of R&B artist." Leah Greenblatt of Entertainment Weekly referred to the song as a "swaggering" lead single. Jon Caramanica of The New York Times referred to the song as a type that he has made his specialty, and called it an "electric, brassy collaboration." Although Nick Levine of Digital Spy called the song "a brutal, tuneless hunk of industrial R&B – as musically ugly as something like 'With You' was pretty", he said "for that matter, this track rocks", commenting "Whatever you may think of him, you can't claim that Chris Brown lacks balls." Jude Rogers of BBC Music said the song was catchy, but was one of the album's tracks that were a "pale imitation of Justin Timberlake album tracks."

== Chart performance ==
In the United States, the song entered the Billboard Hot 100 at number fifty-two. After weeks of ascending and descending the charts the single reached a peak of twenty on its eighth week on the chart, giving Brown his eighth top twenty hit in the United States. Also in the U.S., the song peaked at number eleven on the Hot R&B/Hip Hop Songs. In Canada, the song entered the charts at seventy-five. The song fluctuated around the charts for seven weeks before finally peaking at fifty-four on its eight-week.

It reached five on the Flanders and Wallonia Belgian Tip Charts. The song peaked at number seven in New Zealand, where it spent seven weeks on the chart. "I Can Transform Ya" peaked in the top thirty in the United Kingdom, and Ireland, whilst reaching number nine on the UK R&B Chart. In Australia it peaked at twenty-one, where it spent eighteen weeks on the chart. It reached fifty-seven on the Mega Single Top 100 in the Netherlands, having a seven-week stint. "I Can Transform Ya"'s charting in European marks propelled it to debut and peak at seventy-six on the European Hot 100. The song was certified Platinum in New Zealand by the RIANZ and Gold in Australia by the ARIA.

== Credits and personnel ==
- Vocals – Chris Brown, Lil Wayne, Swizz Beatz
- Songwriting – Chris Brown, Jason "Poo Bear" Boyd, Kasseem Dean, Joseph "Lonny" Bereal, Dwayne Carter
- Production – Swizz Beatz
- Audio Mixing – Manny Marroquin, assisted by Christian Plata and Erik Madrid
- Recording Engineer – Brian Springer
- Guitar – Rayfield "Ray-Ray" Holloman
- Mastering – Chris Bellman

== Charts ==
=== Weekly charts ===
Weekly chart performance for "I Can Transform Ya"
| Chart (2009–10) | Peak position |
|---|---|
| Australia (ARIA) | 21 |
| Belgium (Ultratip Bubbling Under Flanders) | 5 |
| Belgium (Ultratip Bubbling Under Wallonia) | 5 |
| Canada Hot 100 (Billboard) | 54 |
| European Hot 100 Singles (Billboard) | 76 |
| Ireland (IRMA) | 21 |
| Netherlands (Dutch Top 40 Tipparade) | 11 |
| Netherlands (Single Top 100) | 57 |
| New Zealand (Recorded Music NZ) | 7 |
| Scottish Singles Sales (Official Charts) | 32 |
| UK Singles (Official Charts) | 26 |
| UK Hip Hop/R&B (Official Charts) | 9 |
| US Billboard Hot 100 | 20 |
| US Hot R&B/Hip-Hop Songs (Billboard) | 11 |
| US Rhythmic Airplay (Billboard) | 11 |

=== Year-end charts ===
2009 year-end chart performance for "I Can Transform Ya"
| Chart (2009) | Position |
|---|---|
| UK Singles (Official Charts Company) | 196 |

2010 year-end chart performance for "I Can Transform Ya"
| Chart (2010) | Position |
|---|---|
| US Hot R&B/Hip-Hop Songs (Billboard) | 83 |

== Certifications ==
Certifications for "I Can Transform Ya"
| Region | Certification | Certified units/sales |
|---|---|---|
| Australia (ARIA) | Platinum | 70,000^{^} |
| New Zealand (RMNZ) | Platinum | 15,000^{*} |
| Norway (IFPI Norway) | Gold | 5,000^{*} |
| United Kingdom (BPI) | Silver | 200,000^{‡} |
| United States (RIAA) | 2× Platinum | 2,000,000^{‡} |
^{*} Sales figures based on certification alone.^{^} Shipments figures based on certification alone.^{‡} Sales+streaming figures based on certification alone.

== Release history ==
| Region | Date | Format |
|---|---|---|
| United States | September 29, 2009 | Digital download |
| United States | October 5, 2009 | Rhythmic and urban airplay |
