= Crawl (Chris Brown song) =

Single by Chris Brown

from the album Graffiti
- Released: November 23, 2009
- Studio: The Compound, Orlando, Florida
- Genre: R&B
- Length: 3:58
- Label: Jive; RCA; Zomba
- Songwriters: Chris Brown; Nasri Atweh; Luke Boyd; Adam Messinger
- Producer: The Messengers

Chris Brown singles chronology
"I Can Transform Ya" (2009)	"Crawl" (2009)	"Back to the Crib" (2009)

Music video
- "Crawl" on YouTube

"Crawl" is a song by American singer Chris Brown. It is the second single from his third studio album Graffiti, released as a digital download on November 24, 2009 by Jive Records. The song was produced by the Messengers and was written by Brown, Nasri Atweh, Luke Boyd and Adam Messinger. The song is about yearning to rebuild a failed relationship and was interpreted by critics as being about Brown's former relationship with Rihanna. However, Brown has stated the song is not about any of his previous relationships.

The song received positive to mixed reviews. It charted in the top 20 in Japan and New Zealand, and the top 40 in the United Kingdom and Ireland. It peaked in the United States at number 53. The accompanying music video features Brown and singer Cassie as his love interest. In the video, Brown yearns for their relationship on a winter night in a city and in a desert scene. Brown performed the song on his 2009 Fan Appreciation Tour, and on BET's SOS: Help for Haiti Telethon, which benefited victims of the 2010 Haiti earthquake.

== Background ==
The song was leaked to internet on October 21, 2009, one day after ex-girlfriend Rihanna's ballad "Russian Roulette" was also leaked. The song, which has been described as "melancholy", sees Brown singing about a relationship that has slipped out of his hands with its chorus calling for an "incremental reconciliation" of the unspecified relationship. Jayson Rodriguez of MTV News noted that both "Crawl" and Rihanna's "Russian Roulette" would inevitably be interpreted as being about Brown and Rihanna's relationship.

In a 2009 interview with MTV News, Brown stated that the song is not about Rihanna or any of his previous relationships. He called the message of the song "universal", and not just about love but "any type of heartache." The singer said that the track "was like, probably one of the best [records I've done.] But it was more than me trying to do a record that meant crawl to love, crawl back to love. Meaning whether it's from your negative situations, whether it's from any problems you've dealt with, like anybody's situation." Although he stated his concept for the song was about love, he said for anybody, the song could be "inspired as far it being the war or a death in the family, whether it's anything, anybody just crawl back to love."

== Music video ==
The music video was edited by David Blackburn and directed by Joseph Kahn, who also worked with Brown on the "I Can Transform Ya" and "Forever" videos. The video features singer Cassie as Brown's love interest. Kahn had previously directed the video for Britney Spears's 2008 'comeback' song, "Womanizer", after her public breakdown. In an interview with MTV News, Kahn said, "I seem to be the guy that record companies go to when they need help," he joked. "I truly feel [Brown] is remorseful. You don't drop people just because they made a mistake (even if it was a big mistake)."

Kahn said that the entire idea for the video was Brown's: "It's an interesting video for me, because it's so rare that music videos ever try to achieve anything emotional. Chris just basically told me a story of what he felt this video was going to be, with his heart glowing and how he's, like, cold. It is a very personal story. But it's told in such a graphic manner that I fell in love with the idea. It's Chris' story. Period. I am the pencil that put it down on the paper." When comparing the song's video to that of "I Can Transform Ya", the director said, "'Crawl' is my favorite one, because—gosh, I'm going to let you in on this—'cause it's probably his most personal thing he's ever done." He went on to say, "I mean, everything that's happened to him in the year, I think this is going to be his big statement, in terms of what he's feeling and what he's living through right now." When talking about the ideas and concepts of the video, Kahn said that the video, his first ballad with Brown, should speak for itself through the ideas that he had and the "genesis" of what that idea was.

On November 2, 2009, several stills from the video were released onto the internet. The photos focused on two sets of the video, a desert location, and a snow and puddle-spotted alleyway. In both settings, Brown wears the same thick black glasses, brown leather trench coat, white T-shirt, and fingerless gloves, among other attire. Cassie appears in a photo from the alleyway scenes, as the desert scenes show Brown in "deep contemplation". The video first aired on The Wendy Williams Show on Friday, November 13, 2009, when Brown was a guest on the show. The video opens with Brown sitting on an edge of a bed wearing a plain white T-shirt. As the music begins and he starts singing, his heart is shown lit up red and beating in his chest. The singer then walks into an alleyway on a winter's night, revealed in the air as he breathes. Brown walks past several storefronts, seeing images of Cassie broadcast on television. He then sees paparazzi taking photos of her, but she does not notice him. Brown is shown in a desert scene, and then returns to the winter night scene as Cassie sees him and they walk towards each other meeting face-to-face. They gather close, but Brown does not reel her in as the video ends. The music video ranked at forty-eight on the BET: Notarized Top 100 Videos of 2009 countdown.

== Live performances ==
Brown performed the song on his 2009 Fan Appreciation Tour, and on Black Entertainment Television's SOS Saving Ourselves: Hope for Haiti Telethon, to raise money for the country after the 2010 earthquake that devastated the area. Eric Ditzian of MTV News noted that although the song was rumored to be about Rihanna, "the lyrics also at times seemed to fit the evening's focus, like when Brown sang, "If we crawl till we can walk again/ Then we'll run until we're strong enough to jump."

== Critical reception ==
"Crawl"
A 30-second sample of "Crawl" featuring the pre-chorus and chorus by Brown

The song received mixed to positive reviews. Greg Kot of the Chicago Tribune said the song was one of several on parent album Graffiti that "flirt with a public apology." Kot went on to state that a "funeral organ" hovers over the song, and "the narrator longs for a second chance: "'So where do we go from here/With all of this fear in your eyes?'" Jon Caramanica of The New York Times said that both "Crawl" and another song from Graffiti, "So Cold", come off as "thoughtful, even if they're not quite mea culpas" and further suggested that "In these moments Mr. Brown is pining, mildly apologetic." Leah Greenblatt of Entertainment Weekly called the song a "genuinely affecting second single", and stated that "Less forgiving listeners" looking for "signs of contrition" may find them on the track. Dan Gennoe of Yahoo! Music UK said that, of the six tracks on the album's deluxe edition that could be interpreted as dealing with Brown's relationship with Rihanna directly, "Crawl" is "by far the most catchily contrite." Rap-Up said that the song shows Brown "taking baby steps back to love and into the spotlight," and said that it found Brown "longing to mend a broken relationship" as in his 2008 Jordin Sparks collaboration, "No Air".

== Chart performance ==
After the song's premiere on Brown's MechanicalDummy.com website, "Crawl" made its official debut on the R&B/Hip-Hop Songs chart at number ninety-nine. After its release for digital download on November 23, 2009, it later peaked at fifty-nine. On the week ending December 12, 2009, "Crawl" debuted on the Billboard Hot 100 at sixty-eight and peaked at fifty-three.

On December 19, 2009, "Crawl" debuted on the UK Singles Chart at seventy-six. In February, the song re-entered the chart at eighty-five, and debuted on the UK R&B chart at twenty-five.On the week of February 27, 2010, the song reached its peak of number thirty-five on the singles chart, and eventually peaked at number eight on the R&B chart. The song debuted and peaked on the New Zealand Singles Chart at number sixteen on the week beginning February 1, 2010. The song debuted and peaked at number thirty-nine on the Irish Singles Chart, and reached number eight on the Dutch singles chart. It peaked at number twenty on the Japan Hot 100, and ninety-seven on the European Hot 100.

== Track listing ==
- Digital download
1. "Crawl" – 3:57
- Germany Digital download
1. Crawl – 3:56
2. Graffiti – 5:12

== Credits and personnel ==
- Songwriting – Chris Brown, Nasri Atweh, Adam Messinger and Luke Boyd
- Production – The Messengers: Adam Messinger and Nasri Atweh
- Lead Vocals – Chris Brown
- Background vocals – Luke Boyd & Nasri Atweh
- Recording Engineer – Brian Springer
- Mixing – Manny Marroquin, assisted by Christian Plata & Erik Madrid

== Charts ==
=== Weekly charts ===
Weekly chart performance for "Crawl"
Chart (2009–2010)	Peak position
Australia (ARIA)	67
Ireland (IRMA)	39
Netherlands (Dutch Top 40 Tipparade)	8
New Zealand (Recorded Music NZ)	16
Scottish Singles Sales (Official Charts)	38
UK Singles (Official Charts)	35
UK Hip Hop/R&B (Official Charts)	8
US Billboard Hot 100	53
US Hot R&B/Hip-Hop Songs (Billboard)	59
US Rhythmic Airplay (Billboard)	26

=== Year-end charts ===
2010 year-end chart performance for "Crawl"
Chart (2010)	Position
Brazil (Crowley)	43

== Certifications ==
Certifications for "Crawl"
Region	Certification	Certified units/sales
Australia (ARIA)	Gold	35,000^{‡}
New Zealand (RMNZ)	Gold	7,500^{*}
Norway (IFPI Norway)	Platinum	10,000^{*}
United States (RIAA)	Gold	500,000^{‡}
^{*} Sales figures based on certification alone.^{‡} Sales+streaming figures based on certification alone.

== Release history ==
Region	Date	Format
United States	November 24, 2009	Digital download
United States	December 8, 2009	Rhythmic radio
Germany	March 26, 2010	Digital download
