= Ben Spivak =

Canadian singer and musician (born 1983)

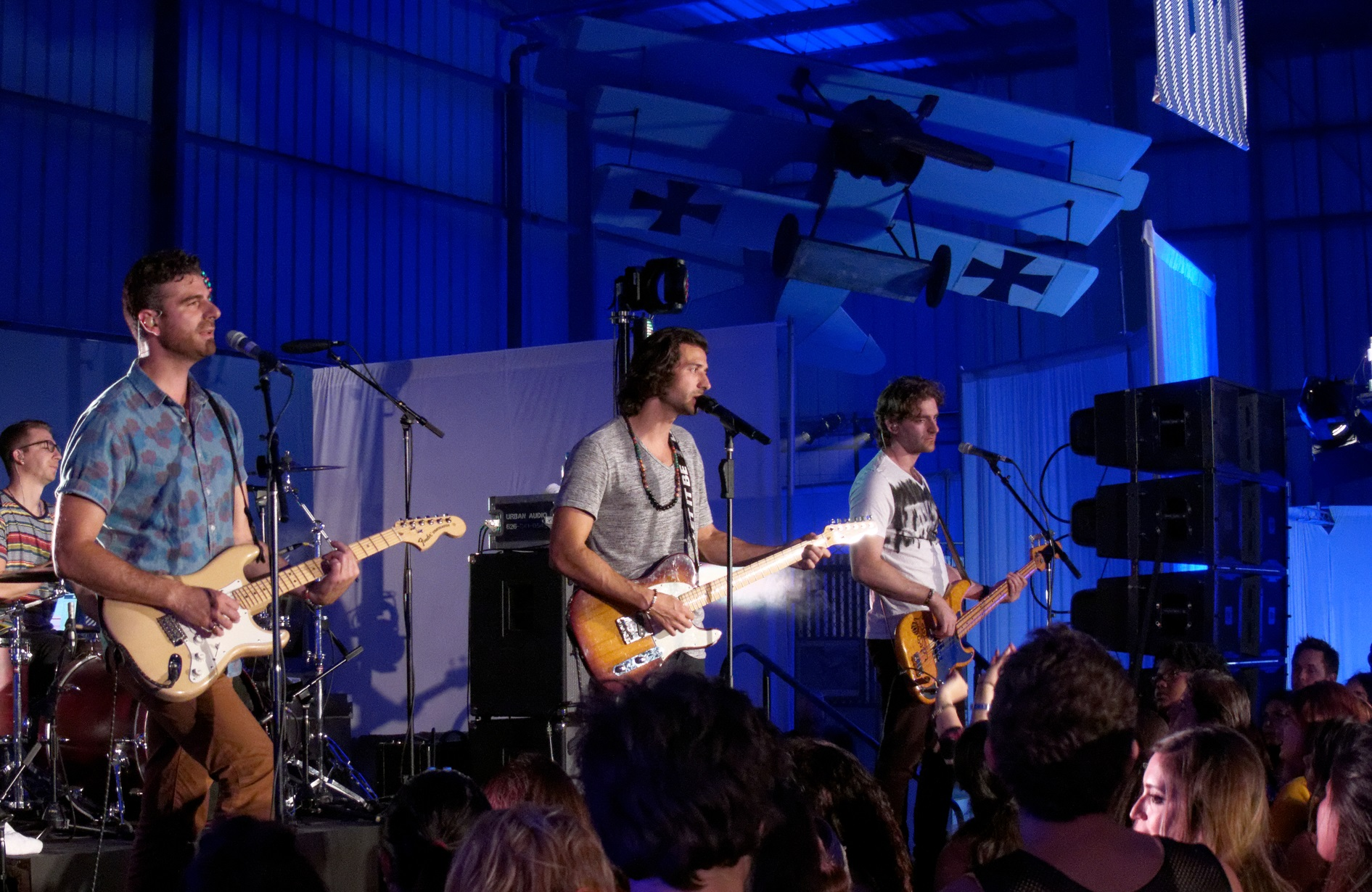
Ben Spivak (first from right, with a guitar) performing as part of the band Magic! in 2014

Ben Spivak (born January 4, 1983) is a Canadian singer and musician. He is best known for being a bassist and vocalist in the pop-reggae group Magic! In addition, Spivak has performed with a variety of musicians including Canadian hip hop group K-Os, Julian Taylor Band, and Alyssa Reid. Spivak currently resides in Los Angeles, California.

== Early life ==
Ben Spivak was born in Toronto, Canada, on January 4, 1983. He began playing piano at age four and guitar at age nine. As a junior high student, he picked up the cello and upright bass. He studied at Humber College in Toronto, where he earned a B.A in Jazz Performance with a major in Bass. While at Humber, Ben and his friends Rory Sills and Ben Weigensberg formed the band Cavern, where they wrote original music, recorded a 3-song EP, and toured around Ontario. Additionally at Humber, Spivak began to get hired for gigs, and began to collaborate with other artists. He gigged with Liam Titcomb, Mudmen, and country artist Johnny Reid.

He toured for two years with the Canadian hip hop artist K-Os, which opened for the 2007 Gym Class Heroes tour titled "Daryl Hall for President." The group performed on the David Letterman Show on February 20, 2007. The band was a part of the lineup for Warped Tour in 2007. In 2008, the band was a part of the lineup for the 2008 Good Vibrations music festival in Australia.

== Ben & Aubrey ==
Ben Spivak was one half of the band Ben and Aubrey, with Aubrey Stork, in 1999, they released a CD called Lost In Paradise.

== Julian Taylor Band ==
In 2009, Spivak became a founding member of the Julian Taylor Band. The band recorded live covers in their album titled Hey Hey Two Two. Before Spivak's move to Los Angeles, he recorded bass for what would become the album titled Tech Noir, which was released in 2014.

== Solo career ==
In 2010, Spivak released a self-titled solo album. The album had ten songs, written by Ben Spivak himself. In the album, Spivak plays a majority of the instruments, including the guitar, bass, piano, keyboards, and organs.

== Magic! ==
Spivak is the bassist and supporting vocalist band for the pop-reggae band Magic! The band formed when frontman Nasri met singer-songwriter Mark "Pelli" Pellizzer, and noticed an immediate musical connection. When Spivak moved to Los Angeles in 2013, he met Mark, and was asked to become their bass player. The group's single, "Rude", peaked #1 on the Billboard Top 100 chart. The group toured with Maroon 5, and has opened for artists such as Dirty Heads.
