= Nasri (musician) =

Canadian musician (born 1981)

Nasri نصري طوني عطوة
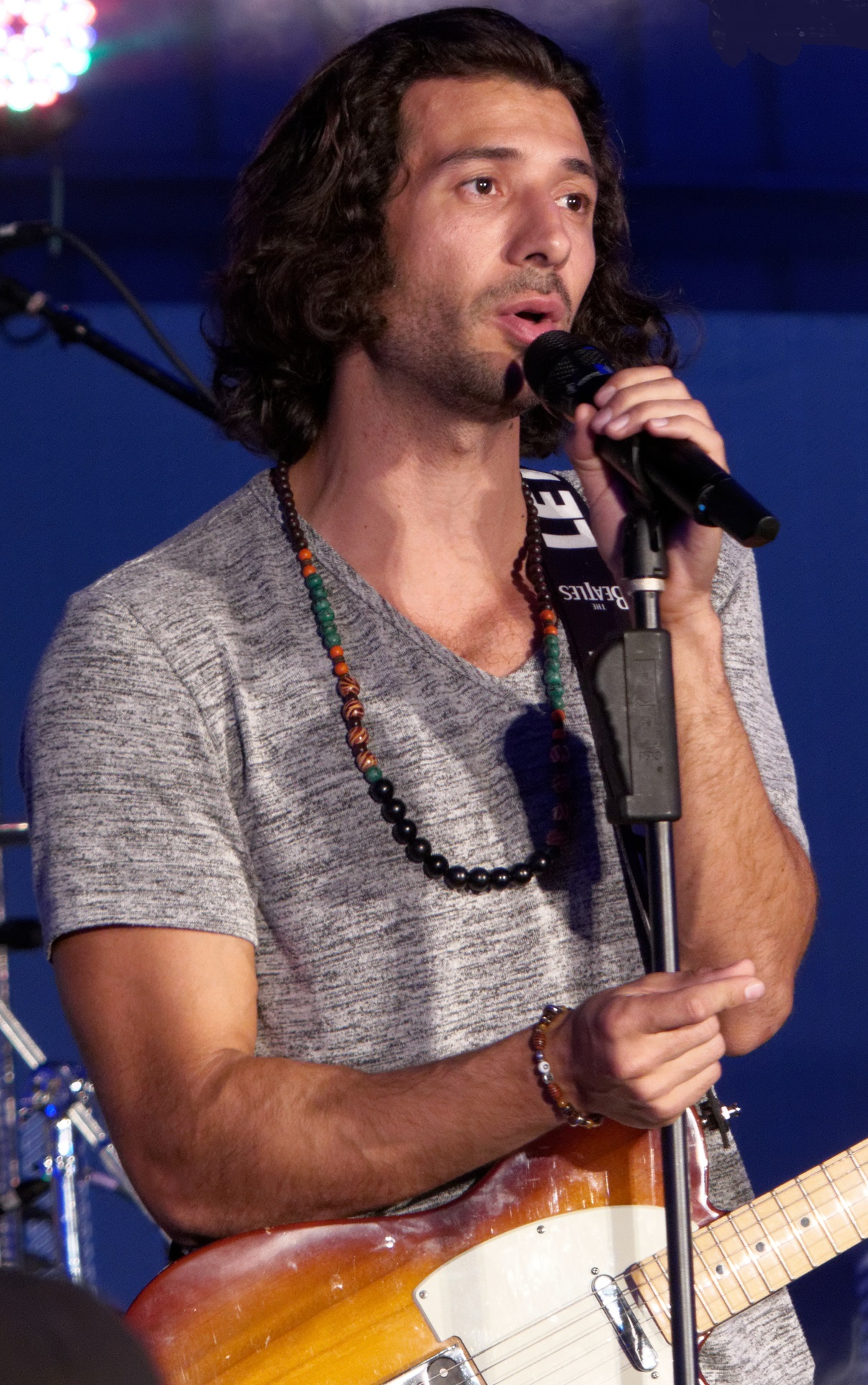
- Nasri performing live with Magic! in September 2014

Background information
- Born: Nasri Tony Atweh; 10 January 1981 (age 45); Toronto, Ontario, Canada
- Genres: Pop; pop rock; reggae; reggae fusion; reggae rock
- Occupations: Singer; songwriter
- Instruments: Vocals; guitar; piano
- Years active: 2002–present
- Label: RCA
- Member of: Magic!; The Messengers

Nasri Tony Atweh (Arabic: نصري طوني عطوة, born 10 January 1981), known mononymously as Nasri, is a Canadian singer, songwriter and record producer. He is the lead vocalist and songwriter for the reggae fusion band Magic!, which he formed in 2012 with fellow Toronto natives Mark Pellizzer, Alex Tanas, and Ben Spivak. The band is best known for their 2013 single "Rude", which peaked in the Billboard Hot 100.

Nasri is also one half of the songwriting and production duo The Messengers, which has produced songs for other music industry acts, including Justin Bieber, Shakira, Pitbull, Chris Brown, and Halsey. He won Best R&B Album at the 54th Annual Grammy Awards for his production work on Chris Brown's F.A.M.E.. He also won a Latin Grammy for his work on Shakira's El Dorado (2017). Two of his co-writing credits, "As Long as You Love Me" by Justin Bieber and "Feel This Moment" by Pitbull, peaked in the Billboard Hot 100's top ten.

== Life and Career ==
=== Early life and career beginnings ===
Nasri was born and raised in Toronto, Ontario, as a child of Palestinian Christian immigrants from Bethlehem and began singing at the age of six. At age 19, Nasri presented a demo to a local radio station and earned a deal with Universal Canada. Two years later, in 2002, he won the John Lennon Songwriting Contest with a song he wrote with Adam Messinger.

The following year, he released two solo singles through Universal: "Go" and "Ova N' Dun With". The songs received some airplay in Canada, and another song titled "Best Friend" was also heard on indie radio in his hometown in 2003. According to the promotional material attached to "Go", he was to release an album titled Invisible Walls sometime in 2003 or 2004, but that never materialized. In 2007, he released a song called "Click, Click, Click" that would ultimately be covered by New Kids on the Block. Nasri helped drive the reunion of New Kids on the Block by writing numerous songs for them, including their 2008 reunion song "Summertime", which was Nasri's first top 40 hit.

=== 2008–2011: The Messengers ===
Around 2008, Nasri signed with Sony ATV as part of the writing and production duo The Messengers alongside Adam Messinger. In the following years, Nasri wrote (usually with Messinger) for other major label artists, such as Justin Bieber, David Guetta, Shakira, Cody Simpson, Cheryl, Boyzone, JLS, Kat Deluna, Elliott Yamin, Jason Derulo, Akon, Pitbull, Christina Aguilera, Chris Brown, Lana Del Rey, Big Time Rush, Iggy Azalea, Michael Bolton, Peter Andre, JoJo, Jay Sean, Vanessa Hudgens, No Angels, Manafest, and Iyaz.

As collaborators, The Messengers have won two Grammy Awards: Best R&B Album for Chris Brown's F.A.M.E. in 2011 and Best Latin Pop Album for Shakira's El Dorado in 2018. They also received two Grammy nominations in 2011: Best Pop Vocal Album for Justin Bieber's My World 2.0 and Best Contemporary R&B Album for Chris Brown's Graffiti. Outside the Grammys, they won a CMT Music Award for Best Collaborative Video with Justin Bieber and Rascal Flatts' "That Should Be Me" in 2011 and were nominated for Album of the Year in the 2017 Latin Grammy Awards for Shakira's El Dorado.

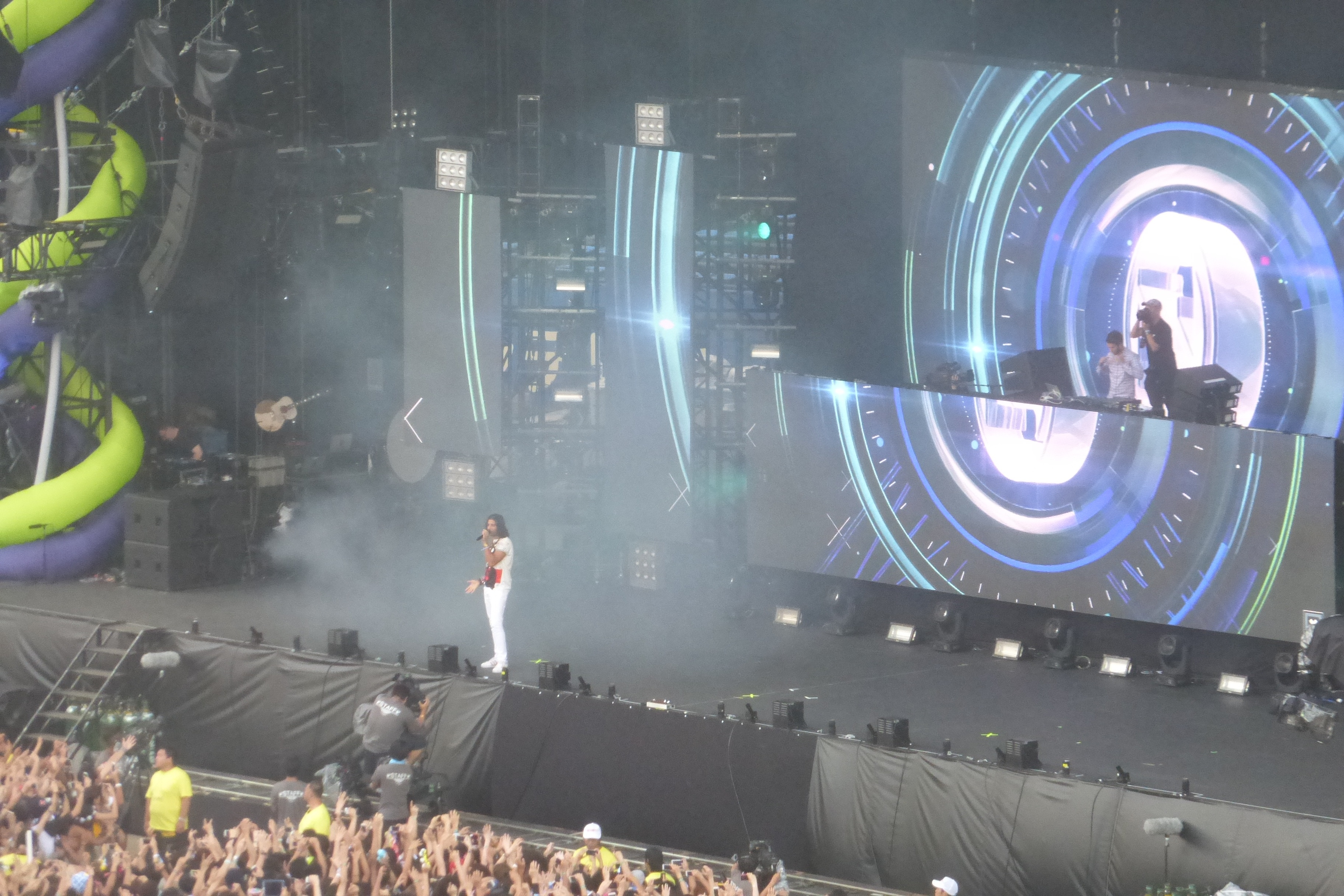
Nasri performing on stage with Zedd at Tokyo Summer Sonic in 2015

=== 2012–present: Magic! and Solo Career ===
While playing music with friend Mark Pellizzer (who played guitar for Justin Nozuka) in 2012, Nasri conceived of Magic!. Mark Pellizzer then recruited Alex Tanas on drums and Ben Spivak on bass. In 2013, Magic! released their debut single, "Rude", which peaked at number six on the Canadian Hot 100, topped the charts in the United States and the United Kingdom, and peaked in the top ten of the charts in Australia, New Zealand, Denmark, the Netherlands and Sweden. The band is signed to Sony Music Entertainment and partnered with Latium Entertainment in addition to RCA Records in the USA.

Their debut album, Don't Kill the Magic, was released in 2014 and charted at number 5 in Canada and at number 6 in the U.S. Their follow-up, Primary Colours, was released in 2016 and their third album Expectations in 2018.

Magic! debuted as an independent act in 2022 with their single "Ain't Got Nothing Figured Out". In 2024, they released their first independent album, Inner Love Energy. According to Nasri, he is "happily independent", saying, "I don’t need a recording budget. I don’t need an A&R telling me what to do. I just want to make great music and connect with people directly."

In January 2021, Nasri self-released his debut solo EP, Here for You. On 9 May 2025, he released a duet with Jamaican singer Shenseea called "I'll Be Fire".

== Personal life ==
Nasri has been in a relationship since 2009 with German singer Sandy Mölling, whom he met while working on the No Angels album Welcome to the Dance (2009). They had a son, Noah, in 2015 and got married in 2020; Nasri also has a stepson who is six years older than Noah. The family first lived in Woodland Hills, Los Angeles; since 2025, they have been commuting between the United States and Bonn.

== Discography ==
=== EPs ===
List of EPs with notes
Title	Album details
Here for You	Released: 29 January 2021; Label: Peace Baby; Formats: Digital download

=== Singles ===
==== As lead artist ====
- "Go" (2003)
- "Ova N' Dun With" (2003)
- "Click Click Click" (2007)
- "You Deserve Better" (2012)
- "No Peace" (2024)
- "Wonderful World" (2024)
- "I'll Be Fire" (with Shenseea) (2025)
- "Pra Sempre (Falei)" (with Maiara & Maraisa) (2025)
- "Wake Up (With You Mine)" (with Felix Jaehn) (2025)
- "Heaven on Earth" (2025)
- "I Promise You That" (with Banada AL9) (2025)

==== As featured artist ====
- "Call You" (Cash Cash featuring Nasri) (2018)

=== Songwriting and production ===
Selected songs with production and songwriting credits
Song name	Year	Primary artist(s)	Album	Role	Notes
"Summertime"	2008	New Kids on the Block	The Block	Co-writer	US #36
"Crawl"	2009	Chris Brown	Graffiti	Co-writer, co-producer	US #53
"One Life"	2009	No Angels	Welcome to the Dance	Co-writer, co-producer	GER #15
"Derailed"	2009	No Angels	Welcome to the Dance	Co-writer	
"Dance-Aholic"	2009	No Angels	Welcome to the Dance	Co-writer	
"Say Goodbye"	2009	No Angels	Welcome to the Dance	Co-writer	
"Too Old"	2009	No Angels	Welcome to the Dance	Co-writer	
"Young Love"	2009	No Angels	Welcome to the Dance	Co-writer	
"Up"	2010	Justin Bieber	My World 2.0	Co-writer, co-producer	
"That Should Be Me"	2010	Justin Bieber	My World 2.0	Co-writer, co-producer	US #92
"Pray"	2010	Justin Bieber	My Worlds Acoustic	Co-writer, co-producer	US #61
"Never Say Never"	2010	Justin Bieber	My Worlds Acoustic	Co-writer, co-producer	US #8
"Mistletoe"	2011	Justin Bieber	Under the Mistletoe	Co-writer, co-producer	US #11
"Next to You"	2011	Chris Brown (feat. Justin Bieber)	F.A.M.E.	Co-writer	US #26
"On My Mind"	2011	Cody Simpson	Coast to Coast	Co-writer	US Pop #39
"Feel This Moment"	2012	Pitbull (feat. Christina Aguilera)	Global Warming	Co-writer, co-producer	US #8
"All Around the World"	2012	Justin Bieber (feat. Ludacris)	Believe	Co-writer	US #22
"As Long as You Love Me"	2012	Justin Bieber (feat. Big Sean)	Believe	Co-writer	US #6
"Don't Judge Me"	2012	Chris Brown	Fortune	Co-writer	US #67
"The Vision of Love"	2012	Kris Allen	Thank You Camellia	Co-writer, co-producer	US Top 40 #29
"We Own the Night"	2013	The Wanted	Word of Mouth	Co-writer, co-producer	US #94
"Change Your Life"	2014	Iggy Azalea (feat. T.I.)	The New Classic	Co-writer, co-producer	UK #10
"You Don't Care About Me"	2014	Shakira	Shakira	Co-writer	
"The One Thing"	2014	Shakira	Shakira	Co-writer	
"Cut Me Deep"	2014	Shakira (feat. Magic!)	Shakira	Co-writer	
"Can I"	2017	Prince Charlez	Evolution Pt. 1	Co-writer	
"Arms Open"	2017	The Script	Freedom Child	Co-writer	
"Bad News"	2017	SOJA	Poetry in Motion	Co-writer	
"Comme Moi"	2017	Shakira (feat. Black M)	El Dorado	Co-writer	
"What We Said (Comme Moi)"	2017	Shakira (feat. Magic!)	El Dorado	Co-writer	
"Not Afraid Anymore"	2017	Halsey	Fifty Shades Darker: Original Motion Picture Soundtrack	Co-writer, co-producer	US #77
"Flame"	2017	Tinashe	Joyride	Co-writer	
"So Long"	2017	Massari	Beirut	Co-writer	
"High Right Now"	2019	Tyla Yaweh	Heart Full of Rage	Co-writer	
"I Cry"	2020	Usher	non-album release	Co-writer, co-producer	
"Changes"	2020	Justin Bieber	Changes	Co-writer, co-producer	
"Never Break"	2020	John Legend	Bigger Love	Co-writer, co-producer	
"Busy Boy"	2020	Chloe x Halle	Ungodly Hour	Co-writer, co-producer	
"Don't Make It Harder on Me"	2020	Chloe x Halle	Ungodly Hour	Co-writer	
"A New Day"	2021	No Angels	20	Co-writer	
"Love You for Eternity"	2021	No Angels	20	Co-writer	
"Hard to Love"	2021	H.E.R.	Back of My Mind	Co-writer	
"It's Christmas"	2025	No Angels	It's Christmas	Co-writer	
