= Mark Pelli =

Canadian musician (born 1980)

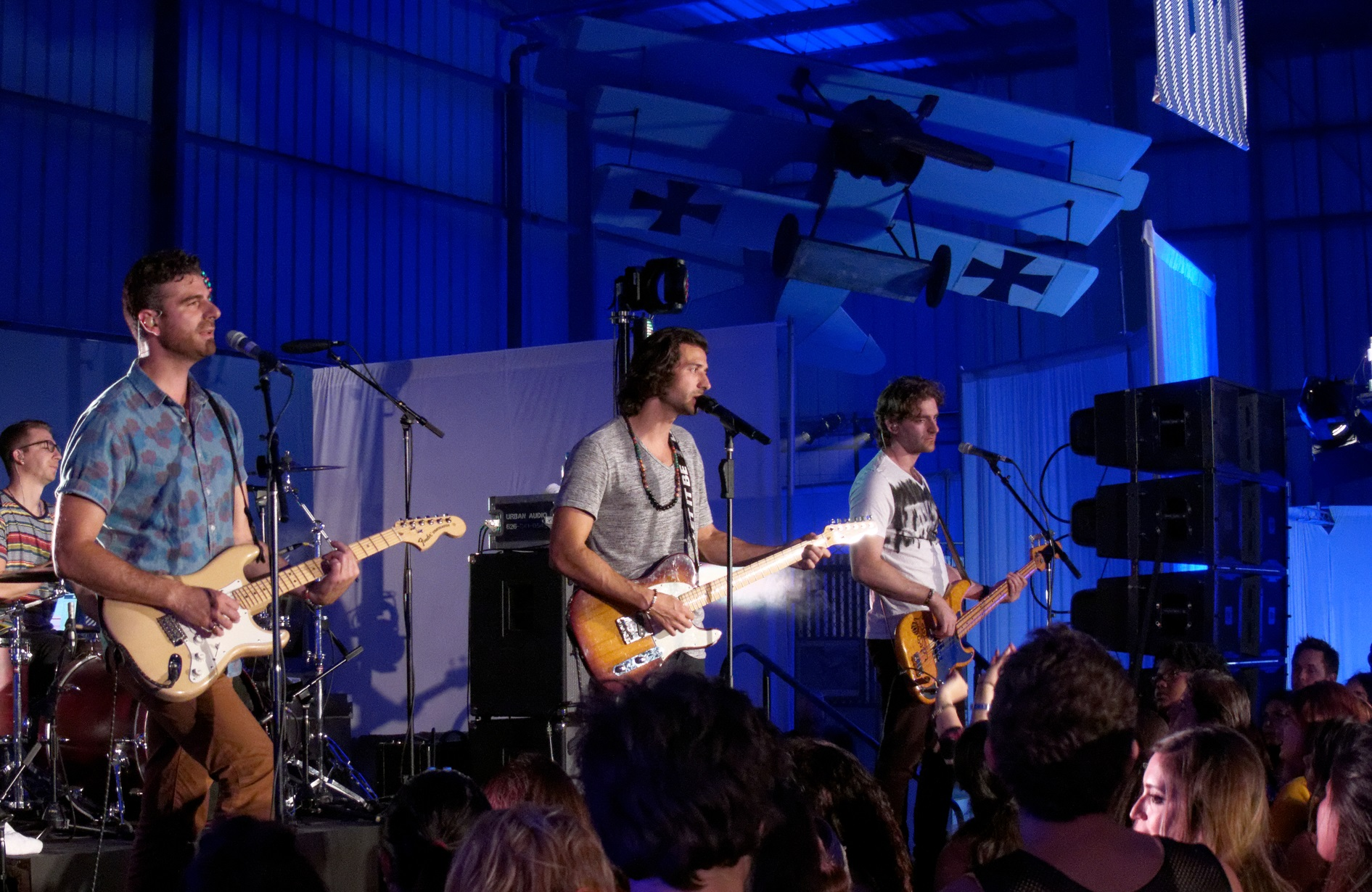
Pellizzer (in foreground, second from left, with a guitar) performing as part of the band Magic! in 2014

Mark Pellizzer (born June 14, 1980), better known by his stage name Mark Pelli, is a Canadian musician, singer, songwriter, and record producer. He is best known as a guitarist and vocalist for the pop-reggae group Magic!. In addition to performing, Pellizer produced and wrote songs for artists including: Chris Brown, Trey Songz, Shakira, Anthony Hamilton, Classified, and Vita Chambers. Pelli resides in Los Angeles, California.

== Early life ==
Mark Pellizzer was born in Toronto, Ontario, Canada, on June 14, 1980. He began piano at age six and the guitar at thirteen. As a child, he perform in Toronto, presenting diverse genres. At age sixteen, Pellizer began producing and engineering albums and working at recording studios. He studied classical piano at York University, where he studied under Antonin Kubalek. He transferred to the University of Toronto where he studied jazz guitar under the mentorship of David Occhipint. He graduated in 2004. From 2007 to 2012, Pellizzer was a member of the Justin Nozuka band, where he assisted in composing music and touring.

== Career ==
Pelli released two singles, "You Changed Me" in 2018 and "Lifetime" in 2019.

=== Collaborations ===
In 2012, he collaborated with The Messengers to produce "Don't Judge Me" for Chris Brown which hit #1 on U.S. Urban chart, #18 on the Hot R&B/Hip-Hop Songs chart and 67 on the Billboard Top 100 chart. Pellizer co-produced/wrote "Cut Me Deep" for Shakira. He co-wrote "Inner Ninja" for Canadian rapper Classified which hit number 5 in Canada and was 5× Platinum. Pelli co-produced/wrote "Serial Killer" for Trey Songz. He co wrote/produced and mixed "Coming Home" for Anthony Hamilton. He co-produced/wrote "Fix You" for Vita Chambers. Pelli worked in studio with Usher, Jennifer Lopez, JoJo, and Marsha Ambrosius. In 2014, he collaborated with Kiprich to produce and feature on "My Own Holiday". In August 2015, he announced a collaboration with artist Major Myjah, to produce "Disposable" off Major Myjah's EP Trouble. Most recently Pellizer co-wrote, produced and mixed most of Sabrina Claudio's debut EP Confidently Lost including: "Too Much Too Late", "I Won't", "Tell Me", "Runnin' Thru Lovers", "Confidently Lost", and the acoustic version of "Tell Me." In 2018, Pelli worked with T-Minus to produce J.Cole's song "Kevin's Heart."

== Magic! ==
Pellizer is the guitarist, keyboardist and vocalist for the pop-reggae group Magic!. He started the group with frontman Nasri Atweh due to their friendship and musical connection in the studio. Magic! is a fusion of musical styles, but is primarily considered a pop-reggae group with a sonic aesthetic similar to The Police. In 2013, the group released "Rude", which ranked #1 at the Billboard Top 100 chart. The group toured with Maroon 5, and toured in Europe in 2015. The group won an American Music Award in 2014 for "Rude" as the Best Single of the Year. In 2015, they received a Juno Award for Breakthrough Group of The Year.

== Recognition ==
- Socan Award (2014) for his song "Inner Ninja" in collaboration with Classified.
- Juno Awards for Single of the Year and Breakthrough Group of the Year.
