= Rude (song) =

2013 single by Magic!

Single by Magic!

from the album Don't Kill the Magic
- B-side: "Mama Didn't Raise No Fool"
- Released: October 11, 2013
- Recorded: December 2012
- Studio: The Ox (North Hollywood, California)
- Genre: Reggae fusion
- Length: 3:44
- Label: Latium; RCA; Sony
- Songwriters: Nasri Atweh; Adam Messinger; Mark Pellizzer; Ben Spivak; Alex Tanas
- Producer: Adam Messinger

Magic! singles chronology
"Rude" (2013)	"Don't Kill the Magic" (2014)

Music video
- "Rude" on YouTube

"Rude" is the debut single by Canadian band Magic! from their debut studio album, Don't Kill the Magic. It was originally released as a promotional single on October 11, 2013, and then re-released on February 24, 2014, by Sony Music Entertainment. The lyrics consist of a young man expressing indignation after his girlfriend's father denies him permission to marry her, and proclaiming that he will "marry her anyway". The official remix for the song features Kid Ink and Ty Dolla Sign, with Blink-182 member Travis Barker on the drums.

"Rude" was an international commercial success amidst mixed reception from music critics. The song peaked at number six on the Canadian Hot 100 and internationally topped the charts in the United States and the United Kingdom and peaked within the top ten of the charts in Australia, New Zealand, Ireland, Denmark, the Netherlands, and Sweden. "Rude" was the ninth best-selling song of 2014, with global sales of 8.6 million units, and won the Juno Award for Single of the Year.

== Background and composition ==
"Rude" (2014)
A 22-second sample of "Rude", a pop and reggae fusion song.

"Rude" was written by Nasri, Adam Messinger, Mark Pellizzer, Ben Spivak, and Alex Tanas, and produced by Adam Messinger. Sheet music for "Rude" shows five flats in common time.

"Rude" was named after the reggae term "rude boy" and originally based on a real-life situation. The lead singer of Magic!, Nasri, had been in an unhealthy relationship with a previous girlfriend. After the two of them got into a fight with each other, the band based the song off that headline. The couple was in a "mean time" when they were both being rude to each other, as Nasri says in what he describes as a "dark vibe". However, the plot was ultimately changed to be about a father who refused to allow his daughter to marry the narrator.

== Critical reception ==
Critical reviews for "Rude" have been mixed. 4Music complimented the song, saying: "One listen and you'll be hooked." An article in Psychology Today drew a connection between the lyrics of the song and social attitudes about interracial relationships, while Time magazine named "Rude" the worst song of 2014, criticizing its "sanitized reggae-fusion sound" and lyrics. Renowned for Sound gave "Rude" a 4 out of 5 star rating, calling the track "lighthearted fun."

== Music video ==
The music video was filmed in November 2013, directed by David Rousseau. It features the band singing the song in a garage while scenes show Nasri in a relationship with a woman played by model Ayla Parker. After this, Nasri asks her conservative father, played by actor Brian Knudson, for her hand in marriage, but the father refuses and won't explain why. The mother, played by actress Mary Kay McCartney, is somewhat softer. Eventually, Nasri secretly proposes to her and together with the rest of the band, try to convince the father, but he still refuses. Nasri marries her anyway and all party in the garage as Parker proclaims her love for Nasri and she abandons her overprotective father's house once and for all. The video was released on the band's YouTube account on December 5, 2013. As of December 2024, the video has over 2.5 billion views on YouTube, and is one of the top 70 most viewed videos on the site.

== Live performances and covers ==
On December 9, 2013, the band made their Australian television debut on Sunrise, where they performed "Rude". In June 2014, the band performed an acoustic version of the song on On Air with Ryan Seacrest. In July, they performed it on The View and on The Tonight Show Starring Jimmy Fallon. On August 10, 2014, the band performed the song at the 2014 Teen Choice Awards. Magic! and American singer Marc Anthony performed a Spanglish version of the song at the 15th Latin Grammy Awards ceremony in 2014 with Anthony singing parts of the song in Spanish.

In September 2014, 15ECONDS (now Aviwkila) performed the song on Rising Star Indonesia. Their performance got a 94% approval rating from viewers.

On July 15, 2015, Postmodern Jukebox released a cover version of the song on YouTube, featuring Von Smith.

In September 2015, American singer Selena Gomez covered the song on BBC Radio 1's Live Lounge.

== Track listing ==
Digital download
No.	Title	Length
1.	"Rude"	3:44
2.	"Rude (remix) (ft. Kid Ink, Ty Dolla $ign & Travis Barker)"	3:36

CD single
No.	Title	Length
1.	"Rude"	3:45
2.	"Mama Didn't Raise No Fool"	4:07

=== Zedd remix ===
On 2 September 2014, Russian-German DJ and record producer Zedd released a remix of the song through Sony Music Entertainment lasting 4 minutes and 33 seconds.

Digital download
No.	Title	Length
1.	"Rude" (Zedd remix)	4:33

== Chart performance ==
"Rude" entered the US Billboard Hot 100 at number 97 on May 10, 2014. On the issue dated July 26, 2014, the song reached number one, marking their first and only number-one single. "Rude" spent six consecutive weeks at number one. On the chart issue dated September 6, 2014, the song tumbled from number one to number 5 on the Hot 100 as Taylor Swift's "Shake It Off" debuted atop the chart. This is the first time since The Black Eyed Peas' "I Gotta Feeling" that a song fell all the way to the number 5 spot after spending as many as six weeks atop the chart. The song spent 16 weeks in the chart's top 10. Magic! is the sixth Canadian band to top the Billboard Hot 100, the first since Nickelback with "How You Remind Me" in 2001. It is also the ninth reggae song to reach the summit, the last being Sean Paul's "Get Busy" in 2003.

"Rude" reached number two on the Billboard Hot Digital Songs on June 18, 2014, selling 207,000 digital copies. The following week the song peaked at number one, selling 210,000. It is only the second reggae song to top the Billboard Hot Digital Songs, after Sean Kingston's "Beautiful Girls" in 2007. The song was certified three-times Platinum by the RIAA in September 2014 and has sold 3 million copies in the US, as of January 2015.

"Rude" peaked at number six on the Canadian Hot 100 and remained on the chart for 69 weeks. In Australia, "Rude" peaked at number two on the Australian Singles Chart. In New Zealand, the song peaked at number two on the New Zealand Singles Chart. In the United Kingdom, "Rude" debuted at number 50 on the UK Singles Chart on July 20, 2014 ― for the week ending date July 26, 2014 ― before climbing to number two a week later. The song topped the chart on August 3, 2014 ― for the week ending date August 9, 2014 ― becoming Magic!'s first chart-topper in Britain. The song peaked at number two in Ireland.

== Charts ==
=== Weekly charts ===
Chart (2013–2015)	Peak; position
Australia (ARIA)	2
Austria (Ö3 Austria Top 40)	3
Belgium (Ultratop 50 Flanders)	37
Belgium Dance (Ultratop Flanders)	30
Belgium (Ultratop 50 Wallonia)	44
Belgium Dance Bubbling Under (Ultratop Wallonia)	15
Brazil (Billboard Brasil Hot 100)	18
Canada Hot 100 (Billboard)	6
Canada AC (Billboard)	2
Canada CHR/Top 40 (Billboard)	4
Canada Hot AC (Billboard)	1
Czech Republic Airplay (ČNS IFPI)	5
Czech Republic Singles Digital (ČNS IFPI)	4
Denmark (Tracklisten)	3
Finland (Suomen virallinen lista)	8
France (SNEP)	51
Germany (GfK)	7
Hungary (Editors' Choice Top 40)	6
Hungary (Stream Top 40)	28
Ireland (IRMA)	2
Israel International Airplay (Media Forest)	4
Italy (FIMI)	11
Japan Hot 100 (Billboard)	4
Mexico Anglo (Monitor Latino)	1
Netherlands (Dutch Top 40)	3
Netherlands (Single Top 100)	5
New Zealand (Recorded Music NZ)	2
Norway (VG-lista)	2
Romania (Airplay 100)	4
Poland Airplay (ZPAV)	1
Russia Airplay (TopHit)	15
Scottish Singles Sales (Official Charts)	1
Slovakia Airplay (ČNS IFPI)	6
Slovakia Singles Digital (ČNS IFPI)	1
Slovenia (SloTop50)	1
South Africa Airplay (EMA)	8
Spain (Promusicae)	5
Sweden (Sverigetopplistan)	2
Switzerland (Schweizer Hitparade)	11
UK Singles (Official Charts)	1
Ukraine Airplay (TopHit)	65
US Billboard Hot 100	1
US Adult Alternative Airplay (Billboard)	17
US Adult Contemporary (Billboard)	1
US Adult Pop Airplay (Billboard)	1
US Alternative Airplay (Billboard)	19
US Dance Airplay (Billboard)	3
US Dance Club Songs (Billboard)	41
US Latin Airplay (Billboard)	23
US Pop Airplay (Billboard)	1
US Rhythmic Airplay (Billboard)	5
US (Monitor Latino)	13
Venezuela (Record Report)	74
Venezuela Top Anglo (Record Report)	1

=== Year-end charts ===
Chart (2013)	Position
Australia (ARIA)	67

Chart (2014)	Position
Australia (ARIA)	40
Austria (Ö3 Austria Top 40)	43
Canada (Canadian Hot 100)	5
Denmark (Tracklisten)	13
Germany (Official German Charts)	54
Italy (FIMI)	31
Japan (Japan Hot 100)	39
Japan Adult Contemporary (Billboard)	3
Netherlands (Dutch Top 40)	15
Netherlands (Single Top 100)	19
New Zealand (Recorded Music NZ)	10
Poland (ZPAV)	17
Romania (Airplay 100)	44
Russia Airplay (TopHit)	103
Slovenia (SloTop50)	25
Spain (PROMUSICAE)	37
Sweden (Sverigetopplistan)	17
Switzerland (Schweizer Hitparade)	58
UK Singles (Official Charts Company)	12
US Billboard Hot 100	7
US Adult Contemporary (Billboard)	13
US Adult Top 40 (Billboard)	5
US Dance/Mix Show Airplay (Billboard)	28
US Mainstream Top 40 (Billboard)	6
US Rhythmic (Billboard)	24

Chart (2015)	Position
Brazil (Crowley)	40
Canada (Canadian Hot 100)	94
Slovenia (SloTop50)	17
US Adult Contemporary (Billboard)	21

Chart (2016)	Position
Argentina Airplay (Monitor Latino)	51
Brazil (Brasil Hot 100)	26

Year-end chart performance
Chart (2025)	Position
Argentina Anglo Airplay (Monitor Latino)	41

=== Decade-end charts ===
Chart (2010–2019)	Position
US Billboard Hot 100	74

== Certifications ==
Region	Certification	Certified units/sales
Australia (ARIA)	5× Platinum	350,000^{‡}
Canada (Music Canada)	5× Platinum	400,000^{‡}
France (SNEP)	Gold	100,000^{‡}
Germany (BVMI)	Platinum	600,000^{‡}
Italy (FIMI)	3× Platinum	150,000^{‡}
Mexico (AMPROFON)	3× Diamond+3× Platinum+Gold	1,110,000^{‡}
New Zealand (RMNZ)	6× Platinum	180,000^{‡}
Spain (Promusicae)	3× Platinum	180,000^{‡}
Sweden (GLF)	3× Platinum	120,000^{‡}
Switzerland (IFPI Switzerland)	Gold	15,000^{^}
United Kingdom (BPI)	3× Platinum	1,800,000^{‡}
United States (RIAA)	Diamond	10,000,000^{‡}
Streaming
Denmark (IFPI Danmark)	3× Platinum	5,400,000^{†}
Spain (Promusicae)	Platinum	8,000,000^{†}
^{^} Shipments figures based on certification alone.^{‡} Sales+streaming figures based on certification alone.^{†} Streaming-only figures based on certification alone.

== Release history ==
Country	Date	Format	Label
Worldwide	October 11, 2013	Digital download	Latium; Sony
United States	February 24, 2014	Adult album alternative	Latium; RCA; Sony
United States	March 17, 2014	Hot adult contemporary	Latium; RCA; Sony
United States	March 17, 2014	Contemporary hit radio	RCA
Germany	February 28, 2014	CD single	Latium; Sony
United Kingdom	July 20, 2014	Digital download	Latium; Sony

== See also ==
- List of Billboard Adult Contemporary number ones of 2014
