= List of songs recorded by Brand New =

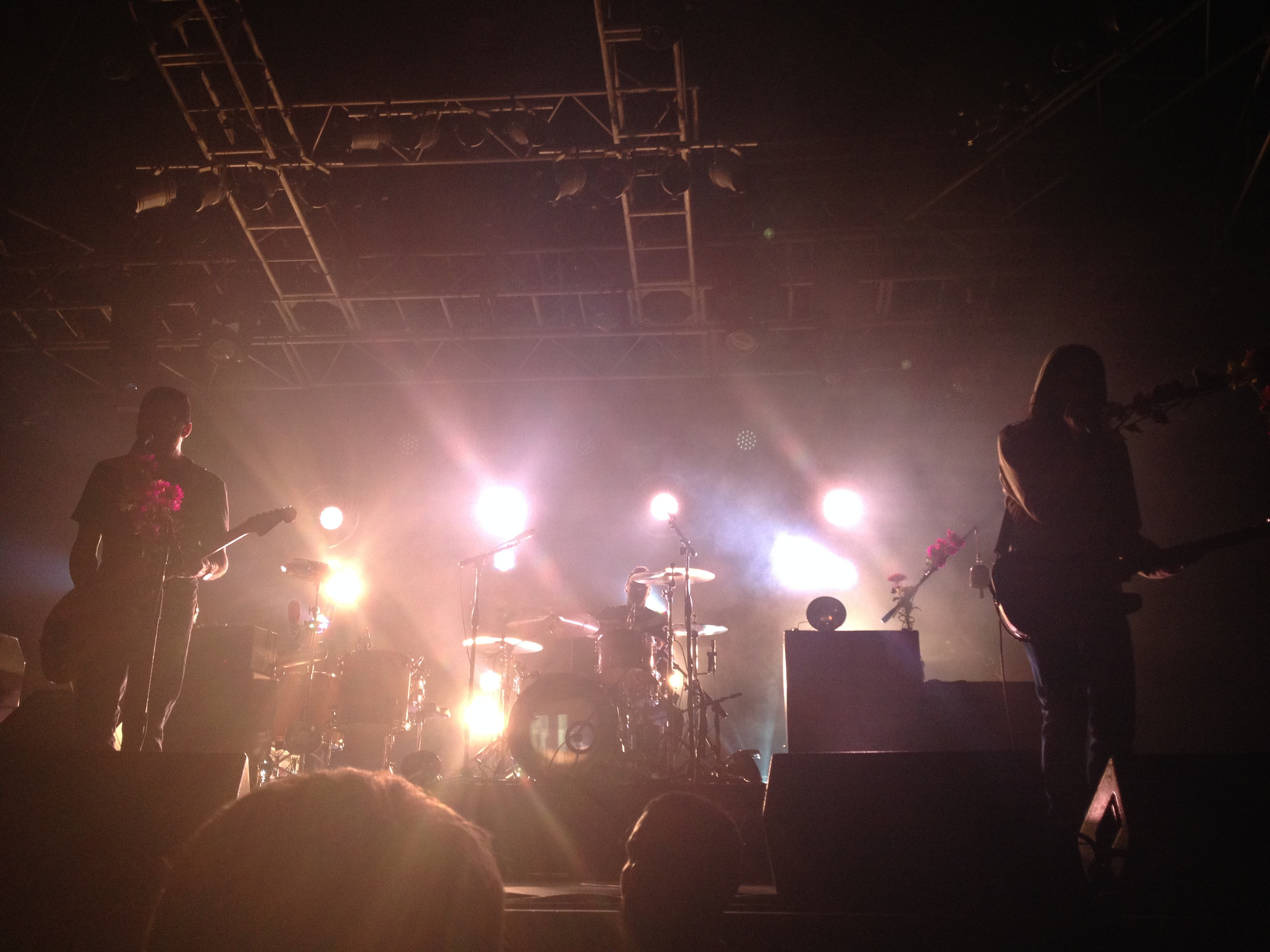
Brand New at House of Blues in Lake Buena Vista, Florida in 2014.

The American rock band Brand New has recorded songs for five studio albums, as well as numerous extended plays and demos. This list comprises the band's song catalog, as well as live renditions, early demo tracks, recorded appearances on other albums, and unreleased tracks that have been discussed by the band. Brand New formed in Long Island, a suburb of New York City in 2000. The group consists of vocalist and guitarist Jesse Lacey, guitarist Vincent Accardi, drummer Brian Lane, and bassist Garrett Tierney. Previous member Derrick Sherman also contributed guitar to a number of the band's releases, whilst producer Mike Sapone has worked with the band throughout their career, and is considered by the band to be a fifth or sixth member.

== Songs ==
Key
†	Indicates single release
†	Indicated unreleased song
†	Indicates songs covered by Brand New

Title	Year	Album	Length	Composer	Notes	Ref.
"--"	2006	The Devil and God Are Raging Inside Me	2:04	Jesse Lacey	Instrumental; Sometimes track-listed as "Untitled"	
"137"	2017	Science Fiction	5:02			
"1996"	2015	Leaked Demos 2006	4:58	Jesse Lacey	Originally known as "Untitled #2"	
"451"	2017	Science Fiction	4:53			
"aloC-acoC"	2006	"Sowing Season"	3:42	Jesse Lacey	Originally titled "Coca Cola"	
"Am I Wrong" †	2002	Brand New / Safety in Numbers	3:40	Jesse Lacey	Love Spit Love cover	
"At the Bottom" †	2009	Daisy	4:04	Vincent Accardi; Jesse Lacey	Live studio version appears as a bonus track on Daisy	
"Battalions"	2015	Leaked Demos 2006	5:35	Jesse Lacey	Originally known as "Untitled #9"	
"Batter Up"	2017	Science Fiction	8:28			
"Be Gone"	2009	Daisy	1:31	Vincent Accardi		
"Bed"	2009	Daisy	3:10	Jesse Lacey	Live studio version appears as a bonus track on Daisy	
"Bought a Bride"	2009	Daisy	3:07	Jesse Lacey	Live studio version appears as a bonus track on Daisy	
"Brothers"	2006	"Jesus"	3:46	Jesse Lacey	Originally known as "Untitled #3"; Also appears on Leaked Demos 2006 under the title "Brother's Song"	
"Can't Get It Out"	2017	Science Fiction	3:43			
"Car" †	2003	"The Quiet Things That No One Ever Knows"	2:36	Built to Spill	Built to Spill cover	
"Could Never Be Heaven"	2017	Science Fiction	3:16			
"Daisy"	2009	Daisy	3:06	Vincent Accardi		
"Degausser"	2006	The Devil and God Are Raging Inside Me	3:48	Vincent Accardi; Jesse Lacey; Brian Lane; Garrett Tierney		
"Desert"	2017	Science Fiction	3:37			
"DVD Song" †	2006	Unreleased		Jesse Lacey	Unreleased; Written during sessions for The Devil and God Are Raging Inside Me	
"Failure By Design"	2001	Your Favorite Weapon	3:15	Jesse Lacey		
"Flying at Tree Level"	2003	Beer: The Movie Soundtrack	3:55	Jesse Lacey		
"Fork And Knife" †	2007	"(Fork and Knife)"	4:06	Jesse Lacey; Vincent Accardi	Originally known as "Untitled #7"; Early version appears on Leaked Demos 2006	
"Gasoline"	2009	Daisy	3:32	Vincent Accardi		
"Good Man"	2015	Leaked Demos 2006	1:59	Jesse Lacey	Originally known as "Untitled #1"	
"Good to Know That If I Ever Need Attention All I Have to Do Is Die"	2003	Deja Entendu	7:01	Jesse Lacey	Demo version appears on The Holiday EP	
"Guernica"	2003	Deja Entendu	3:23	Jesse Lacey		
"Handcuffs"	2006	The Devil and God Are Raging Inside Me	4:11	Vincent Accardi		
"I Will Play My Game Beneath the Spin Light"	2003	Deja Entendu	3:57	Jesse Lacey		
"In a Jar"	2009	Daisy	3:06	Vincent Accardi; Jesse Lacey		
"In the Water"	2017	Science Fiction	6:52			
"I Am a Nightmare" †	2016	"I Am a Nightmare"	3:20	Jesse Lacey		
"Jaws Theme Swimming"	2003	Deja Entendu				
"Jesus" †	2006	The Devil and God Are Raging Inside Me	5:19	Jesse Lacey	Sometimes track-listed as "Jesus Christ"; Live version appears on "At the Bottom"	
"Jude Law and a Semester Abroad" †	2001	Your Favorite Weapon	3:40	Jesse Lacey	Alternate recording appears on "Jude Law and a Semester Abroad"; Early version appears on 2000 Demo and 2011 Deluxe Edition of Your Favorite Weapon; Acoustic version	
"Last Chance to Lose Your Keys"	2001	Your Favorite Weapon	3:25	Jesse Lacey	Early version appears on 2000 Demo and 2011 Deluxe Edition of Your Favorite Weapon	
"Lazy" †		Unreleased		Brian Lane	Unreleased; Written during sessions for Daisy	
"Limousine (MS Rebridge)"	2006	The Devil and God Are Raging Inside Me	7:42	Jesse Lacey	Sometimes track-listed as "Limousine"	
"Lit Me Up"	2017	Science Fiction	6:17			
"Logan to Government Center"	2001	Your Favorite Weapon	3:03	Jesse Lacey	Early versions appear on 2000 Demo, The Holiday EP and 2011 Deluxe Edition of Your Favorite Weapon	
"Luca"	2006	The Devil and God Are Raging Inside Me	5:09	Jesse Lacey	Originally known as "Untitled #6" and "Mamas"; Early version appears on Leaked Demos 2006	
"Magazines"	2001	Your Favorite Weapon	2:50	Jesse Lacey	Early versions appear on 2000 Demo and 2011 Deluxe Edition of Your Favorite Weapon	
"Me Vs. Maradona Vs. Elvis"	2003	Deja Entendu	5:19	Jesse Lacey		
"Mene" †	2015	"Mene"	2:30	Jesse Lacey		
"Millstone"	2006	The Devil and God Are Raging Inside Me	4:17	Jesse Lacey	Alternate "Reprisal" version appears on "Jesus" single & as a bonus track on some editions of The Devil and God Are Raging Inside Me	
"Missing You"	2015	Leaked Demos 2006	4:56	Jesse Lacey	Originally known as "Untiled #4"	
"Mix Tape"	2001	Your Favorite Weapon	3:58	Jesse Lacey		
"Moshi Moshi"	2002	Brand New / Safety in Numbers	2:27	Jesse Lacey	Also appears on "Jude Law and a Semester Abroad" single Acoustic version appears on "The Quiet Things That No One Ever Knows" single	
"...My Nine Rides Shotgun"	2001	Your Favorite Weapon	3:17	Jesse Lacey	Bonus track	
"No Control"	2017	Science Fiction	3:55			
"Nobody Moves"	2015	Leaked Demos 2006	6:57	Jesse Lacey	Originally known as "Untitled #5"; Alternate recording included on the cassette tape of Leaked Demos 2006	
"Noro"	2009	Daisy	6:27	Vincent Accardi		
"Not the Sun"	2006	The Devil and God Are Raging Inside Me	3:10	Vincent Accardi; Jesse Lacey		
"Oh Holy Night"	2011	The Holiday EP	3:00	Adolphe Adam	Cover	
"Okay I Believe You But My Tommy Gun Dont"	2003	Deja Entendu	5:35	Jesse Lacey		
"Out of Mana"	2017	Science Fiction	5:15			
"Out of Range"	2016	"Mene"	3:44		Jesse Lacey	
"Play Crack the Sky"	2003	Deja Entendu	5:28	Jesse Lacey		
"Same Logic/Teeth"	2017	Science Fiction	5:34	Vincent Accardi		
"Sealed to Me" †	2015	Unreleased	3:40	Jesse Lacey	Unreleased, has only been performed live	
"Secondary"	2001	Your Favorite Weapon	3:01	Jesse Lacey	Early versions appear on 2000 Demo and 2011 Deluxe Edition of Your Favorite Weapon	
"Seventy Times 7"	2001	Your Favorite Weapon	3:33	Jesse Lacey		
"Sic Transit Gloria... Glory Fades" †	2003	Deja Entendu	3:07	Jesse Lacey		
"Simple Man" †		Unreleased	3:27		Leaked online on New Year’s Eve 2018. Apparently written between Deja Entendu and The Devil and God Are Raging Inside Me	
"Sink"	2009	Daisy	3:20	Jesse Lacey		
"Soco Amaretto Lime"	2001	Your Favorite Weapon	4:45	Jesse Lacey		
"Sowing Season" †	2006	The Devil and God Are Raging Inside Me	4:31	Vincent Accardi; Jesse Lacey	Originally known as "...YEAH" and "Untitled #8"; Early version appears on Leaked Demos 2006	
"Sudden Death in Carolina"	2001	Your Favorite Weapon	3:02	Jesse Lacey		
"Tautou"	2003	Deja Entendu	1:43	Jesse Lacey		
"The Archer's Bows Have Broken"	2006	The Devil and God Are Raging Inside Me	4:15	Jesse Lacey	Sometimes track-listed as "Archers"	
"The Boy Who Blocked His Own Shot"	2003	Deja Entendu	4:39	Jesse Lacey		
"The No Seatbelt Song"	2001	Your Favorite Weapon	4:30	Jesse Lacey		
"The Quiet Things That No One Ever Knows" †	2003	Deja Entendu	4:02	Jesse Lacey	Acoustic version appears on "Sic Transit Gloria... Glory Fades" single	
"The Shower Scene"	2001	Your Favorite Weapon	2:24	Jesse Lacey		
"Untitled Instrumental #1" †	2003	Unreleased	3:34			
"Untitled Instrumental #2" †	2003	Unreleased	5:30		Unreleased; Unused instrumental track from Deja Entendu	
"Vices"	2009	Daisy	3:24	Jesse Lacey		
"Waste"	2017	Science Fiction	4:36			
"Welcome to Bangkok"	2006	The Devil and God Are Raging Inside Me	3:06	Vincent Accardi		
"You Stole"	2009	Daisy	6:00	Vincent Accardi; Jesse Lacey		
"You Won't Know"	2006	The Devil and God Are Raging Inside Me	5:42	Jesse Lacey	Used in three episodes of Stargate Universe.	

== See also ==
- Brand New discography
