= Brand New discography =

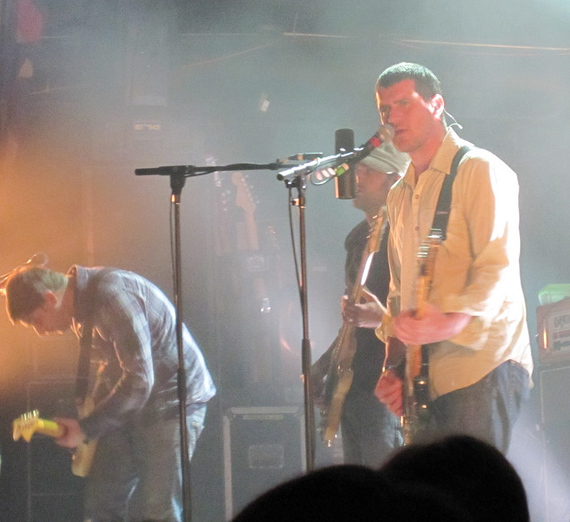
- Brand New performing live in 2009
- Studio albums: 5
- Extended plays: 3
- Singles: 10
- Music videos: 7
- Demos: 3

Brand New is an American rock band. The discography of the group consists of five studio albums, three extended plays, ten singles, and seven music videos.

Brand New released their first studio album, Your Favorite Weapon, in 2001. It sold over 315,000 copies. They released one single from the album, "Jude Law and a Semester Abroad". In 2003, they released their second studio album, Deja Entendu. It sold over 500,000 copies and was certified gold in the US. Two singles from the album, "The Quiet Things That No One Ever Knows" and "Sic Transit Gloria... Glory Fades", charted in the UK. Their third studio album, The Devil and God Are Raging Inside Me, was released in 2006. It was certified gold in the US. A single from the album, "Jesus Christ", was also certified gold in the US. In 2009, Brand New released their fourth studio album, Daisy. It peaked at number 6 in the US. Science Fiction, their fifth studio album, was released in 2017. It peaked at number 1 in the US.

== Albums ==
=== Studio albums ===
Title	Details	Peak chart positions								Sales	Certifications
Title	Details	US	US Alt.	US Rock	AUS	CAN	SCO	UK	UK Rock	Sales	Certifications
Your Favorite Weapon	Release date: October 9, 2001; Label: Triple Crown; Formats: CD, LP	— (Note: Your Favorite Weapon did not enter the US Billboard 200, but peaked at number four on the Vinyl Albums Chart.)	—	—	—	—	—	—	—	US: 315,000	
Deja Entendu	Release date: June 17, 2003; Label: Triple Crown, Razor & Tie; Formats: CD, LP	63	—	—	— (Note: Deja Entendu did not enter the Australian ARIA Albums Chart but peaked at number 16 on the ARIA Hitseekers Chart.)	75	—	105	11		RIAA: Gold; BPI: Silver
The Devil and God Are Raging Inside Me	Release date: November 21, 2006; Label: Interscope, Tiny Evil, Procrastinate; Formats: CD, DL, LP	31	—	8	— (Note: The Devil and God Are Raging Inside Me did not enter the Australian ARIA Albums Chart but peaked at number 17 on the ARIA Hitseekers Chart.)	35	78	77	7	US: 60,000	RIAA: Gold
Daisy	Release date: September 22, 2009; Label: DGC, Interscope, Procrastinate!; Formats: CD, DL, LP	6	3	3	40	17	59	47	—	US: 46,000	
Science Fiction	Release date: October 20, 2017; Label: Procrastinate!; Formats: CD, DL, LP	1	1	1	6	59	47	72	5	US: 55,000	
"—" denotes releases that did not chart

=== Demos ===
Title	Details
Brand New	Release date: 2000; Label: Self-released; Formats: CD-R
Brand New	Release date: 2001; Label: Self-released; Formats: CD-R
Leaked Demos 2006	Release date: December 2, 2015; Label: Procrastinate! Music Traitors; Formats: CS, DL

=== Compilations ===
Title	Details
The Terribly Contagious Sampler	Release date: 2003; Label: Triple Crown, Razor & Tie; Formats: CD

== Extended plays ==
Title	Details
Brand New / Safety in Numbers	Release date: 2002; Label: Triple Crown, Fadeaway; Formats: CD
The Holiday	Release date: December 15, 2003; Label: Self-released; Formats: CD
3 Demos, Reworked	Release date: July 15, 2016; Label: Procrastinate!; Formats: 12", DD

== Singles ==
List of singles, with selected chart positions
Title	Year	Peak chart positions							Certifications	Album
Title	Year	US	US Alt.	US Pop	US Rock	SCO	UK	UK Rock	Certifications	Album
"Jude Law and a Semester Abroad"	2002	—	—	—	—	—	108	—		Your Favorite Weapon
"The Quiet Things That No One Ever Knows"	2004	—	37	—	—	41	39	4		Deja Entendu
"Sic Transit Gloria... Glory Fades"	2004	—	—	—	—	33	37	11		Deja Entendu
"Jesus Christ"	2007	—	30	—	—	36	134	—	RIAA: Gold	The Devil and God Are Raging Inside Me
"(Fork and Knife)"	2007	— (Note: "(Fork and Knife)" did not enter the Billboard Hot 100, but peaked at number 24 on the Bubbling Under Hot 100 Singles chart, which acts as an extension to the Hot 100.)	—	85	—	—	152	—		Non-album singles
"Mene"	2015	— (Note: "Mene" did not enter the Billboard Hot 100, but peaked at number 1 on the Hot Single Sales chart.)	— (Note: "Mene" did not enter the Billboard Alternative Songs Chart, but peaked at number 21 on the Alternative Digital Song Sales chart.)	—	— (Note: "Mene" did not enter the Billboard Hot Rock & Alternative Songs Chart, but peaked at number 27 on the Rock Digital Song Sales chart.)	—	— (Note: "Mene" did not enter the UK Singles Chart, but peaked at number 2 on the UK Official Physical Singles Chart Top 100 chart.)	30		Non-album singles
"I Am a Nightmare"	2016	— (Note: "I Am a Nightmare" did not enter the Billboard Hot 100, but peaked at number 1 on the Hot Single Sales chart.)	— (Note: "I Am a Nightmare" did not enter the Billboard Alternative Songs Chart, but peaked at number 15 on the Alternative Digital Song Sales chart.)	—	18	—	— (Note: "I Am a Nightmare" did not enter the UK Singles Chart, but peaked at number 1 on the UK Official Physical Singles Chart Top 100 chart.)	—		Non-album singles
"—" denotes a recording that did not chart or was not released in that territory.

=== Promotional singles ===
Title	Year	Album
"Sowing Season"	2006	The Devil and God Are Raging Inside Me
"At the Bottom"	2009	Daisy
"Can't Get It Out"	2017	Science Fiction

== Other appearances ==
Title	Year	Album
"Flying at Tree Level" (Version 1.0)	2003	Beer: The Movie
"The Quiet Screaming" (Mash-up with Dashboard Confessional)	2006	Incorporated

== Unreleased material ==
=== Demos ===
Year	Title	Track listing	Extra details
2003	Deja Entendu Demos	"Sic Transit Gloria...Glory Fades" "Me vs. Maradona vs. Elvis" "Boy Who Blocked His Own Shot" "Jaws Theme Swimming" "I Will Play My Game Beneath the Spin Light" "The Quiet Things That No One Ever Knows"; Untitled Instrumental 1 Untitled Instrumental 2 "Guernica Instrumental" "Sic Transit Gloria...Glory Fades (Organ Version)"	"Jaws Theme Swimming" re-appeared as a B-side

=== Songs ===
Year	Title	Track listing	Extra details
TBD	"Sealed to Me"	Performed live throughout 2015 and 2016, yet to be officially released.	

=== Live covers ===
All covers found at this reference:

Title	Original artist	Additional details
"Car"	Built to Spill	
"Yellow"	Coldplay	
"Web in Front"	Archers of Loaf	
"Upward Over the Mountain"	Iron & Wine	
"El Scorcho"	Weezer	
"Fuck and Run"	Liz Phair	
"My Own Worst Enemy"	Lit	
"My Girl"	The Temptations	Played as an encore
"Wish"	Nine Inch Nails	
"Trailer Trash"	Modest Mouse	
"Oh Comely"	Neutral Milk Hotel	
"Two Headed Boy"	Neutral Milk Hotel	
"Pop Queen"	Ben Lee	

== Music videos ==
List of music videos, showing year released and director
Title	Year	Director(s)
"The Shower Scene"	2001	
"Jude Law and a Semester Abroad"	2002	
"The Quiet Things That No One Ever Knows"	2003	Kurt St. Thomas and Mike Gioscia
"Sic Transit Gloria... Glory Fades"	2003	Marc Webb
"Untitled"	2006	
"Jesus Christ"	2007	Moh Azima
"Mene"	2015	

== See also ==
- List of songs recorded by Brand New
