= Jude Law and a Semester Abroad =

Single by Brand New

from the album Your Favorite Weapon
- Released: November 11, 2002
- Recorded: 2001
- Genre: Pop-punk; emo
- Length: 3:41
- Label: Eat Sleep; Triple Crown; Razor & Tie
- Producer(s): Mike Sapone; Brand New

Brand New singles chronology
"Jude Law and a Semester Abroad" (2002)	"The Quiet Things That No One Ever Knows" (2003)

Music video
- "Jude Law and A Semester Abroad" on YouTube

"Jude Law and a Semester Abroad" is the debut single by Brand New. It was released as the first and only single from their debut album, Your Favorite Weapon, first in the United States on November 11, 2002, before being released in the United Kingdom on June 2, 2003.

Songwriter Jesse Lacey described the track as being "about an ex-girlfriend who turned me on to Jude Law and that whole English thing". The artwork for the single is a photograph by Mike Dubin of the band performing live on Long Island.

== Background ==
An early version of the song was first included in their self-released 2000 demo CD, before appearing as the second track on their debut album, Your Favorite Weapon. In early November 2002, the band began rerecording the song. The band stated that the track's music and lyrics would remain the same and that they were simply aiming to produce a higher quality recording, before sending it to be played on the radio. The reworked version of the track was made available as a digital download through the band's website on November 11, 2002.

The album version of the track was also released on CD and on 7" vinyl, exclusively in the United Kingdom through Eat Sleep Records on June 2, 2002. The original 2000 version of the song, from their first four-track demo, was included on their 2003 single "The Quiet Things That No One Ever Knows", from their follow-up album Deja Entendu.

The original album recording from 2001 was remastered and mixed by Emily Lazar and Joe LaPorta, as part of the 2011 reissue of Your Favorite Weapon.

== Music video ==
The music video for "Jude Law and a Semester Abroad" was directed by Christian Winters and production company Fun Game Clique. The music video uses a mixture of both live and documentary footage, and was filmed across the band's tour in early 2002. The video premiered on MTV2 on July 30, 2002, and features the album version of the track, as opposed to the later rerecording.

== Track listing ==
Digital download, November 11, 2002
No.	Title	Length
1.	"Jude Law and a Semester Abroad"	3:40

CD single, June 2, 2003
No.	Title	Length
1.	"Jude Law and a Semester Abroad"	3:41
2.	"Moshi Moshi"	2:28

7" black vinyl, June 2, 2003
No.	Title	Length
1.	"Jude Law and a Semester Abroad"
2.	"Am I Wrong"

== Personnel ==
Brand New

- Jesse Lacey – vocals, rhythm guitar
- Vinnie Accardi – lead guitar
- Garrett Tierney – bass guitar
- Brian Lane – drums, percussion

Production

- Mike Sapone - producer, engineer
- Alan Douche - mixing
- Michael Dubin - photography, cover artwork
