= Deja entendu =

Deja Entendu may refer to:

- Déjà Entendu, the second album from Long Island-based rock band Brand New, released in 2003
- Déjà entendu, a psychological term describing the experience of feeling sure that one has already heard something
