= The Holiday EP =

EP by Brand New
- Released: December 15, 2003
- Recorded: 1999–2003
- Genre: Indie rock; acoustic
- Length: 21:33
- Label: Self-released

Brand New chronology
Déjà Entendu (2003)	The Holiday EP (2003)	The Devil and God Are Raging Inside Me (2006)

The Holiday EP is an EP by the American rock band Brand New. This free limited edition album was released on December 15, 2003, and made exclusively available to members of the Brand New street team. Only 1000 copies were pressed.

The first song, "The Boy Who Blocked His Own Shot (acoustic)", was recorded live on radio station KNRK in Portland, Oregon on July 10, 2003. "Logan to Government Center (demo)" first surfaced on a leaked demo tape and later re-recorded for release on their debut album Your Favorite Weapon (2001). "The Quiet Things That No One Ever Knows (acoustic)" was also recorded live at a radio station, K-Rock Station WXRK in New York City. Record producer Mike Sapone, who produced Your Favorite Weapon, recorded and mixed the demo version of "Good to Know That If I Ever Need Attention All I Have to Do Is Die (demo)". The final song on the EP is the Christmas carol "O Holy Night", written by Adolphe Adam in 1847 and recorded by Brand New and Luke Wood in 2003.

The album art was created by Brian Ewing.

== Track listing ==
No.	Title	Length
1.	"The Boy Who Blocked His Own Shot" (acoustic)	5:03
2.	"Logan to Government Center" (demo)	3:12
3.	"The Quiet Things That No One Ever Knows" (acoustic)	4:09
4.	"Good To Know That if I Ever Need Attention All I Have To Do Is Die" (demo)	5:12
5.	"Oh Holy Night" (cover of O Holy Night, poem by Placide Cappeau, music composed by Placide Cappeau)	3:56
