= Procrastinate! Music Traitors =

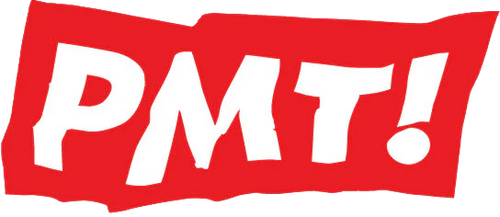
- Founded: 2004
- Founder: Jesse Lacey; Vincent Accardi; Brian Lane; Garrett Tierney
- Genre: Alternative rock; indie rock; emo
- Country of origin: U.S.
- Location: Batavia, Illinois
- Official website: procrastinatemusictraitors.com

Procrastinate! Music Traitors is an American record label started by the members of the band Brand New. Little is known about the label other than its first release, a re-release of Kevin Devine's 2006 album Put Your Ghost to Rest.

On January 11, 2010, Brand New announced via their Twitter account that their 2006 album, The Devil and God Are Raging Inside Me, would be released as a 2-LP white vinyl record through Procrastinate! Music Traitors on March 23, 2010.

Following Brand New's split in 2017, the label went inactive, eventually being revived in 2025 with the release of Stagediver's self-titled debut.

== Discography ==
Catalog	Release date	Artist	Title
PMT-001	April 20, 2008	Kevin Devine	Put Your Ghost to Rest
PMT-004	February 5, 2013	Shone	Heat Thing
PMT-002	December 4, 2015	Brand New	Leaked Demos 2006
PMT-006	April 15, 2016	Greater Pyrenees	Greater Pyrenees
PMT-007	May 20, 2016	Brand New	"I Am a Nightmare"
PMT-003	July 15, 2016	Brand New	3 Demos, Reworked
PMT-005	July 22, 2016	Brand New	"Mene"
PMT-008	October 21, 2016	Kevin Devine	Instigator
PMT-009	October 20, 2017	Brand New	Science Fiction
PMT-013	November 7, 2025	Stagediver	Stagediver

Joint-label releases

Catalog	Release date	Artist	Title	Labels
B0008034-02	November 21, 2006	Brand New	The Devil and God Are Raging Inside Me	Interscope; Tiny Evil
INTR 11990–2	November 21, 2006	Brand New	"Sowing Season" / "aloC-acoC"	Interscope; Tiny Evil
1733029; 1733030	April 30, 2007	Brand New	"Jesus"	Interscope; Tiny Evil
B0013357-02	September 22, 2009	Brand New	Daisy	DGC; Interscope
INTR 12630–2	September 22, 2009	Brand New	"At the Bottom"	DGC; Interscope
7930183326-2; 83326S	November 22, 2011	Brand New	Your Favorite Weapon – 10th anniversary edition	Triple Crown; Razor & Tie
01408–2	October 15, 2013	Kevin Devine	Bulldozer	Devinyl; Favorite Gentlemen
646920318230	April 18, 2015	Brand New	Deja Entendu – vinyl re-issue	Triple Crown; Razor & Tie
PMT-010	October 20, 2017	Kevin Devine	We Are Who We've Always Been	Triple Crown

== See also ==
- List of record labels
