= Brand New / Safety in Numbers =

Brand New/Safety in Numbers Split

EP by Brand New and Safety in Numbers
- Released: March 6, 2002
- Recorded: Sapone Studios (Brand New); Zero Return (Safety in Numbers)
- Genre: Indie rock
- Length: 13:07
- Label: Triple Crown; Fadeaway

Brand New chronology
Your Favorite Weapon (2001)	Brand New/Safety in Numbers Split (2002)	Deja Entendu (2003)

Professional ratings
Review scores
Source	Rating
Punknews.org	3.5/5 stars

Brand New / Safety in Numbers is a split EP by the American bands Brand New and Safety in Numbers, released on March 6, 2002. The split was originally between Brand New and Reggie and the Full Effect, but plans fell through.

After recording their debut album Your Favorite Weapon in 2001, Long Island band Brand New teamed up with their then labelmate Safety in Numbers for a split EP. Each band contributed a new song and a cover song. Brand New gave the EP a B-side called "Moshi Moshi" and a cover of the Love Spit Love song "Am I Wrong" which was popularized on the indie scene in the mid-90s. Safety In Numbers, a group started by Hot Rod Circuit leadman Andy Jackson, had a song called "No Use" and a cover of the popular Journey song "Faithfully". The EP was available to fans of both bands through internet retailers and was specifically sold with the pre-sale for Brand New's full-length Deja Entendu (2003) album.

== Track listing ==
Brand New
No.	Title	Artist	Length
1.	"Moshi Moshi"	Brand New	2:27
2.	"Am I Wrong" (Love Spit Love cover)	Brand New	3:40
Total length:			6:07

Safety in Numbers
No.	Title	Artist	Length
3.	"No Use"	Safety in Numbers	3:18
4.	"Faithfully" (Journey cover)	Safety in Numbers	3:42
Total length:			7:00

== Personnel ==
Brand New

- Jesse Lacey – vocals, rhythm guitar
- Vinnie Accardi – lead guitar, backing vocals
- Garrett Tierney – bass, backing vocals
- Brian Lane – drums, percussion
- Natalie Iozzio – flute (track: 2)

Safety in Numbers

- Andy Jackson – vocals, lead guitar
- Chris Flaherty – backing vocals, rhythm guitar
- Jake Turner – rhythm guitar
- Brona Jackson – backing vocals, bass
- Jake Cardwell – drums
