= Sowing Season =

Single by Brand New

from the album The Devil and God Are Raging Inside Me
- B-side: "aloC-acoC"
- Released: November 21, 2006
- Recorded: November–December 2004
- Genre: Emo; alternative rock; post-hardcore
- Length: 4:31
- Label: Interscope; Tiny Evil; Procrastinate! Music Traitors
- Songwriters: Vincent Accardi; Jesse Lacey
- Producers: Mike Sapone; Brand New

Brand New singles chronology
"Sic Transit Gloria... Glory Fades" (2003)	"Sowing Season" (2006)	"Jesus Christ" (2007)

"Sowing Season", titled "Sowing Season (Yeah)" in certain copies, is a song by American rock band Brand New, which was released as the lead single for their 2006 album, The Devil and God Are Raging Inside Me.

Two different versions of the track have been released. The demo titled "Yeah (Sowing Season)" first leaked in January 2006, and was not officially made available until 2015 when it was included as part of the Leaked Demos 2006, whilst the reworked demo became the opening track "Sowing Season" on the band's 2006 album The Devil and God Are Raging Inside Me.

== Background ==
An early incarnation of the track, known as "Yeah" was first described on the band's website in 2005, revealing that they had recorded it over the winter of 2004 and that "the refrain goes, "...YEAH!" and the middle eight is more like the chorus and it's got some loud guitars going on". In January 2006, a demo of the song was amongst nine tracks that leaked onto the internet, and was subsequently known as "Untitled #8".

After announcing the track listing of their third album The Devil and God Are Raging Inside Me on October 3, 2006, the CD single of "Sowing Season" was offered to customers who preordered the album through their online merchandise store. On October 20, 2006, "Sowing Season" premiered on the band's Myspace profile.

== Composition ==
The original lyrics for "Yeah (Sowing Season)" have been described by Lacey as being about "losing it all and figuring out how to get it all back". Elaborating on the track, Lacey revealed the track was written about members of his family going off to fight in World War II, specifically his Great Uncle, Leo Lacey. Jesse Lacey revealed that his Great Uncle Leo was an American soldier on a transport ship that was heading for Japan during the Pacific War. After the Atomic bombings of Hiroshima and Nagasaki, the transport he was on returned to America, which led Jesse Lacey to consider the duality of both something great happening in his Great Uncle not being deployed whilst "something completely awful [was] happening".

The album version of the song adapts parts from the Rudyard Kipling poem, "If—", which Lacey's father had hanging on the wall of his house. The final version culminates in a bridge where Lacey screams, "I am not your friend! I'm not your lover! I'm not your family!" Speaking about the meaning of the song, Lacey said: "The parts of me that go into a record, or who I am in Brand New, is actually not a very good representation of who I am as a person. If I ever read an interview with me, or saw myself at a show, and then just had no other contact with myself, I know that there's no way to tell exactly who I am or what's in my head for the most part. I'd much rather our music be about the person who's listening to it, rather than the person that's writing it. I'd like to be removed from even the smallest pedestal that people put me on."

== In popular culture ==
The track is playable on the 2009 video game Guitar Hero 5.

== Track listing ==
Promotional CD Single
No.	Title	Writer(s)	Length
1.	"Sowing Season"	Jesse Lacey; Vin Accardi	4:32
2.	"aloC-acoC"	Lacey	3:41

== Personnel ==
Credits adapted from liner notes.

- Brand New – production (track: 1)
- Rich Costey – mixing (track: 1)
- Emily Lazar – mastering (track: 1)
- Jesse Lacey – production (track: 2)
- Claudius Mittendorfer – engineer (track: 1), recording (track: 2)
- Sarah Register – mastering (track: 2)
- Mike Sapone – production (track: 1), mixing (track: 2)
