= Mene (song) =

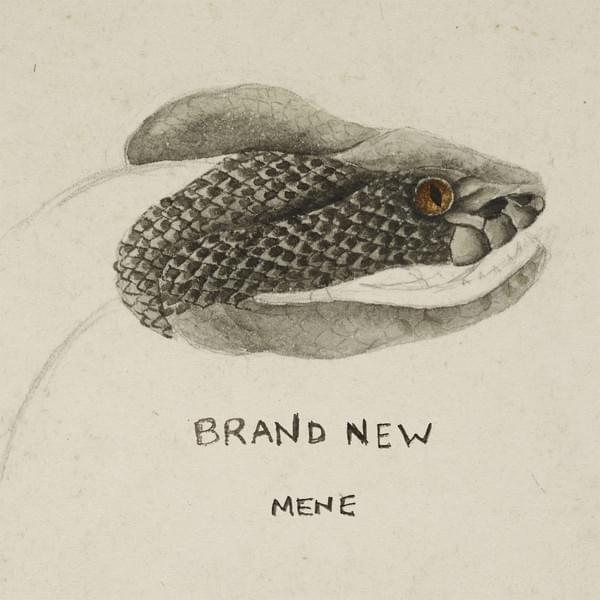

Single by Brand New
- B-side: "Out of Range"
- Released: April 13, 2015
- Genre: Punk rock
- Length: 2:29
- Label: Procrastinate! Music Traitors
- Songwriter: Jesse Lacey
- Producer: Mike Sapone

Brand New singles chronology
"At the Bottom" (2009)	"Mene" (2015)	"I Am a Nightmare" (2016)

"Mene" (/məˈneɪ/ mə-NAY) is a single by American rock band Brand New, first released as a free download on April 13, 2015, before being made available through online retailers on April 15, 2015. This was the band's first release in six years, the last being their 2009 studio album Daisy. The track is a stand-alone single. It was followed by the release of I Am a Nightmare.

The title "Mene" along with many of the song's lyrics are thought to reference the idiom "The writing on the wall" which originates from the Chapter 5 of the Book of Daniel. The song appeared on an episode of the television show The Vampire Diaries.

== Background ==
In an interview, Lacey revealed that "Mene" was first penned around the time of the band's 2006 album The Devil and God Are Raging Inside Me, although at the time the band "didn't like them". It wasn't until almost 10 years later in 2015 that the band remembered the track existed and decided to start performing it, as they now felt differently about the song. Elaborating on the track, Lacey described it as being more catchy and easier to sing along to than the band's more recent releases, with a less complicated melodic structure; "If you look at Daisy, you'll see that the melodies were a little more complicated – I don't want to write or listen to music that tires me out after hearing it and I think that's our goal with the new music", although Lacey believed "Mene" doesn't entirely represent the musical direction the band are going in with their newer material and fifth album.

Lacey's rhythm guitar is tuned to E flat, following an Em, G, C chord progression during the verse (which doubles as the song's main riff), followed by an A, C, Em progression in the pre-chorus before going into a progression of G, A, C in the chorus.

== Release and promotion ==
The band first performed the track on April 8, 2015 at their Denver, Colorado show, then-titled "Don't Feel Anything" after the chorus lyric "we don't feel anything!". On the same day the band deleted all the content from their Instagram, then posted a new promotional picture of the band. The track was performed live at subsequent shows, now listed on the band's setlist as "Mene".

On April 13, 2015, various online music retailers listed that the single would be released on April 15, 2015, also giving a 30-second preview of the track. Later on April 13, the band updated their website to match the style of the "Mene" artwork and allowed fans to download the track for free for a limited period. As of April 15, 2015, the track ceased to be available for free on the band's website and was instead made available to purchase through digital music retailers and play through online streaming services.

A second new track titled "Sealed to Me" was performed for the first time on April 15, 2015, just days after the release of "Mene", leading to a number of media outlets to speculate that the band's fifth album would soon be released. In one of only two interviews the band gave in 2015, the band stated they were working on new songs and hoped to release an album by the end of 2015.

Around its release, the track was played regularly on UK Radio stations Radio 1 and Xfm. "Mene" is featured on American supernatural drama series The Vampire Diaries in the episode "I Carry Your Heart with Me", which was first shown on October 29, 2015.

On July 22, 2016, the "Mene" along with the previously unreleased "Out of Range" were made available as a 7" single, as well as being made available to purchase and stream online.

== Critical reception ==
The song has been positively received by critics. Brennan Carley at Spin praised "Mene", saying it is a "big, brash, guitar-driven return to form that seems primed for stadium and festival sing alongs", while writing for MTV, Brenna Ehrlich said the track was "A mosh-ready jam if there ever was one". Luke Morgan Britton at NME reviewed the track, saying "Mene marks a return to their angry, miserable 'The Devil And God Are Raging Inside Me'-era peak of 2006", while writing for Vice, Ryan Bassil said "it feels like a natural progression for a band that's ageing finer than a bottle of emotionally distraught whiskey." Tori Pederson of Punknews.org awarded the track 4.5 out of 5, hailing the track for seemingly combining elements of all four of their previous records for "surprisingly awesome" results, saying the song "has the fast tempos of Your Favorite Weapon (in fact it might be their speediest track to date), the spoken word vocals from Deja Entendu's 'Sic Transit Gloria... Glory Fades,' the dramatic scope of The Devil and God are Raging Inside Me, and the harsh feedback and throat-shredding screams of Daisy, all within less than two and a half minutes." Writing for Entertainment Weekly, Ariana Bacle said "Mene" is "two minutes and 33 seconds of pure Warped Tour-reminiscent glory". Serene Dominic at The Arizona Republic believed the track was the best Brand New song to date.

== Packaging ==
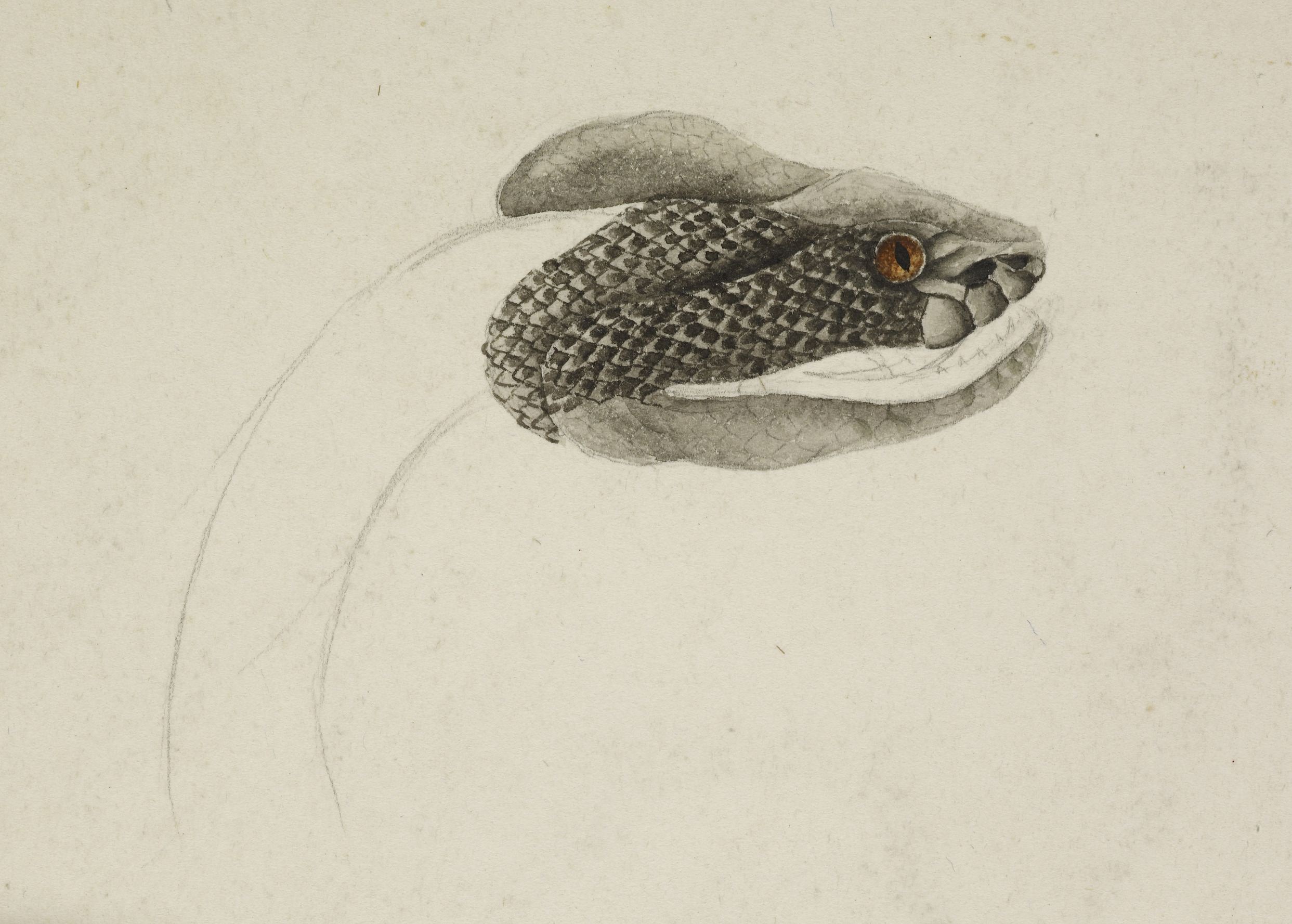
Head of a snake from the British Library archive.

The single's artwork depicts "the detail of a head of a snake" and is a free-to-use image from the British Library archives. The identity of the original artist is unknown, although the image is thought to have been produced sometime between 1818 and 1830 using watercolour and pencil. For the physical release, the single was pressed onto clear 7" vinyl, using additional images created by Morning Breath Inc.

== Music video ==
The video is made up of live-concert footage of the band over the course of their career and was directed by Daniel Navetta of ApK; a company that drummer Brian Lane works for. The footage comes from the band's own video archive of "150 DV tapes, 8 VHS tapes, 12 hard-drives" and was cut together by Brendan Banks for what he describes as a "retrospective music video to get fans excited about the upcoming tour." The end of the video features part of a Kit 'N' Kaboodle cat food advert. Notably, this is the first Brand New song since "--" (sometimes referred to as "Untitled") from their 2006 album The Devil and God are Raging Inside Me to have a music video officially released. The video was released on April 13, 2015 on the band's website and YouTube account.

== Track listing ==
- All songs written by Brand New

Download

No.	Title	Length
1.	"Mene"	2:30

7" Vinyl and Digital

No.	Title	Length
1.	"Mene"	3:28
2.	"Out of Range"	3:41

== Personnel ==
Brand New

- Jesse Lacey – vocals, rhythm guitar
- Vincent Accardi – lead guitar, lead vocals on "Out of Range"
- Garrett Tierney – bass
- Brian Lane – drums

Production

- Mike Sapone – producer, engineer
- Dave Sardy – mixing
- Mike Sapone – mixing ("Out of Range")
- Steve Kupillas – vocal producer, engineer
- Claudius Mittendorfer – engineer
- Stephen Marcussen – mastering
- Emily Lazar – mastering ("Out of Range")
