= At the Bottom =

Single by Brand New

from the album Daisy
- Released: August 11, 2009
- Recorded: 2009
- Genre: Emo
- Length: 3:47 (radio edit); 4:04 (album version)
- Label: DGC; Interscope; Procrastinate! Music Traitors
- Songwriters: Jesse Lacey; Vincent Accardi
- Producers: Mike Sapone; Brand New

Brand New singles chronology
"(Fork and Knife)" (2007)	"At the Bottom" (2009)	"Mene" (2015)

"At the Bottom" is a song by the American rock band Brand New. It is the only single to be released off of their fourth studio album Daisy. The song was released via digital retailers on August 11, 2009. The song went to radio three days early on August 8, 2009. Consequently, radio rips of the song were posted to YouTube on the same day. A physical copy of the single, pressed on CD, was made available with pre-orders of the album through Smart Punk's website and at select retail stores.

The artwork for the single is Field of Probability, an oil painting by Gregory Scheckler.

== Background ==
On April 14, 2009, Brand New's Myspace page was updated with a statement that read "We have started the mixing process with Dave Sardy. Please adjust your schedule accordingly, as we are hoping for a summer release. Thank you for your time and patience. We will see you soon." "At the Bottom" was released as the lead single on August 11, 2009. The song's lyrics were written by both guitarist Vincent Accardi and vocalist Jesse Lacey, marking the band's second song in which Accardi is credited as a songwriter (following "Handcuffs" on The Devil and God Are Raging Inside Me).

The song charted at number 14 on the UK Rock Chart.

== Reception ==
Slant Magazine compared the song's instrumentation to Mission of Burma and described Lacey's vocal performance as "doing his best Isaac Brock impression".

== Track listing ==
Promotional CD single
No.	Title	Length
1.	"At the Bottom" (Radio Edit)	3:47
2.	"Jesus" (Live in studio with Kevin Devine)	4:44

== Charts ==
Chart (2009)	Peak position
UK Rock & Metal (Official Charts)	14
