= Sic Transit Gloria... Glory Fades =

"Sic Transit Gloria...Glory Fades"

Single by Brand New

from the album Deja Entendu
- Released: November 18, 2003
- Recorded: 2003
- Genre: Alternative rock; emo; post-hardcore
- Length: 3:06
- Label: Triple Crown Records
- Songwriters: Vincent Accardi; Jesse Lacey
- Producer: Steven Haigler

Brand New singles chronology
"The Quiet Things That No One Ever Knows" (2003)	"Sic Transit Gloria...Glory Fades" (2003)	"Sowing Season" (2006)

Alternative cover
- DVD cover

Music video
- "Sic Transit Gloria... Glory Fades" on YouTube

"Sic Transit Gloria...Glory Fades" is a single by American rock band Brand New from their second album Deja Entendu. "Sic Transit Gloria... Glory Fades" was released to radio on November 18, 2003 and peaked at No. 37 on the UK singles chart.

The title itself comes from the 1998 film Rushmore, "Sic transit gloria... Glory fades" being one of main character Max Fischer's most memorable lines. The full Latin phrase from which this is derived is Sic transit gloria mundi (Latin: "Thus passes the glory of the world"). This phrase has its origins in Ancient Rome and is used during papal coronations.

== Meaning ==
The lyrics of "Sic Transit Gloria... Glory Fades" tell the story of an inexperienced teenage boy being taken advantage of and losing his virginity to an older woman. Vocalist Jesse Lacey stated in an interview that "I... figured that I wouldn't really have sex until either I was married or I knew I was with the right person. When you get to being 21, 22, 23 years old... it becomes this whole other thing, like 'Well, what am I doing? Is this really important to me?'"

== Reception ==
Pitchfork wrote in 2003, "This song rocks but it makes me wonder: Why would a band like this tour with Dashboard Confessional? To score chicks?"

Drowned in Sound gave the song a 7/10 review, explaining that "despite being lumped in with everything emo, Brand New are a cut above the rest of the backpack brigade, and long may they stay there."

The Phoenix New Times in 2009 listed it among "10 Emo Songs That Don’t Suck", praising the dual vocals and deciding that "it might be about a guy being raped by his girlfriend. Pretty weird, but entirely emo."

In 2022, Variety named "Sic Transit Gloria... Glory Fades" as one of the 25 best emo songs of all time, praising how "the driving bassline and charging guitars hits a Pavlovian response to sing along."

== Music video ==
The music video for "Sic Transit Gloria... Glory Fades" portrays Lacey as a human voodoo doll, who has the ability to move the body parts of other people through moving his own. "Since the song is about taking advantage of someone else," he said, "there's a pretty strong correlation between the video and the song." The idea is attributed to director Marc Webb.

The video raises parallels to two videos by the band Yellowcard, the strongest of which is the appearance of a white lamb on the door to the bar that Lacey enters. The symbol is also present on the briefcase that Ryan Key carries through the videos for "Ocean Avenue" and "Rough Landing, Holly." This is because the videos were directed by Webb, who used the lamb in his videos as a signature of sorts.

It was rumored that the silhouette figure during the last shot in the video is Thursday lead singer Geoff Rickly, but it is actually Glassjaw guitarist Todd Weinstock. Weinstock filled in for Brand New bassist Garrett Tierney for a few shows while he attended a wedding. Following the premier of the music video, the band received emails from fans who believed that Weinstock had permanently replaced Tierney as the band's bassist.

== Release ==
The 7" was pressed on light pink vinyl and features a demo version of the song "Jaws Theme Swimming." This demo song was recorded and mixed by Mike Sapone.

In 2013, the song was covered by American pop punk band We Are the In Crowd. Bassist Mike Ferri said that "We wanted to give a new perspective vocally, and play off of the two gender specific roles they portrayed in the original song."

== Track listing ==
CD Single
No.	Title	Length
1.	"Sic Transit Gloria...Glory Fades"	3:09
2.	"The Quiet Things That No One Ever Knows" (Acoustic)	4:09
3.	"Soco Amaretto Lime" (The Moleman Remix)	4:34

DVD
No.	Title	Length
1.	"Sic Transit Gloria...Glory Fades" (Music Video)	3:09
2.	"Jaws Theme Swimming" (Demo)	4:34
3.	"Photo Gallery"

7" Single
No.	Title	Length
1.	"Sic Transit Gloria...Glory Fades"
2.	"Jaws Theme Swimming" (Demo)

== Charts ==
Chart (2004)	Peak position
Scottish Singles Sales (Official Charts)	33
UK Singles (Official Charts)	37
UK Rock & Metal (Official Charts)	11
