= The Quiet Things That No One Ever Knows =

- The CD single cover. The other releases has a blue or green wiring.

Single by Brand New

from the album Deja Entendu
- Released: October 6, 2003 (limited 7" vinyl); May 17, 2004 (full release)
- Recorded: 2003
- Genre: Emo; pop-punk; alternative rock
- Length: 4:01
- Label: Triple Crown; Razor & Tie (United States); Sorepoint (United Kingdom); Epitaph (selected European territories); Eleven: A Music Company (Australia releases)
- Songwriters: Vincent Accardi; Jesse Lacey
- Producer: Steven Haigler

Brand New singles chronology
"Jude Law and a Semester Abroad" (2002)	"The Quiet Things That No One Ever Knows" (2003)	"Sic Transit Gloria... Glory Fades" (2004)

Audio sample
- file; help

Music video
- The Quiet Things That No One Ever Knows on YouTube

"The Quiet Things That No One Ever Knows" is a song by American rock band Brand New. It served as the first single from their second album Deja Entendu and was released on October 6, 2003 in the United Kingdom on 7" vinyl.

Described by Stereogum as likely "Brand New’s most enduring contribution to the mainstream," the song became the band's first charting single, peaking at No. 39 on the UK Singles Chart and No. 37 on the US Billboard Alternative Songs chart. On the UK Rock & Metal chart, it peaked at No. 4 and remained on the listing for 33 weeks.

As Brand New's sound evolved and became less accessible, the band stopped playing the song regularly during concerts, only adding it to the setlist occasionally. The band returned the song to their normal setlist during their 2025 reunion tour.

== Background ==
Frontman Jesse Lacey said about the song's meaning: "The song's a little bit about regret. How there can be problems in a relationship and they get ignored. And how that often ends up as a broken home or some kind of bad situation down the road. It's kind of something that if it wasn't overlooked in the first place, you can kind of get through it."

The band performed the song on Jimmy Kimmel Live! on October 24, 2003. Lacey wore a suit and taped the words "Hi Moz" to his guitar during the performance, a reference to British singer Morrissey and his influence on the band.

== Release ==
The single was sent for adds on rock radio on July 9, 2003.

The single was originally released commercially on 7" vinyl in the UK on October 6, 2003. It was re-released as a CD, DVD and 7" vinyl single set to promote their UK tour with Incubus on May 17, 2004.

The song is featured in both the soundtracks to the video games NHL 2004 and Tiger Woods PGA Tour 2004.

== Reception ==
Stereogum named "The Quiet Things That No One Ever Knows" as Brand New's ninth-best song in 2015, recalling how "it was damn near inescapable during its reign, and it’s come to represent all the best qualities of that era of alternative rock" but also admitting that "if it were the only Brand New song you’d ever heard, you would have a lot different impression of the band than what they actually were, and it would probably be a lot easier to sweep them under the rug as just another emo band."

The Arizona Republic named it Brand New's ninth-best song in 2015.

Brooklyn Vegan contrasted its "pop punk chorus" that "made that album famous" with the "post-rocky intro song 'Tautou'" when discussing Deja Entendu's role in Brand New's musical maturation.

== Music video ==
A music video for the song was directed by Kurt St. Thomas and Mike Gioscia and filmed in Boston. In the video, Jesse Lacey crashes his car while driving with his girlfriend (played by Alison Haislip). He is fatally wounded, but cannot die until he knows that his girlfriend has survived the accident. The other band members are seen in the waiting room, presumably to check whether or not she is alive.

Lacey said, "The video is about death or losing someone and it's those moments that you kind of look back on your life and realize all the regrets that you had, and all the things you wish you could change ... We didn't want to do a video where we're playing in a living room and the lights are going out and the walls are falling apart, or we're riding around the street in low-riders. That's been done a zillion times. When we play the lights don't really go out and the building doesn't really shake."

== Track listing ==
CD Single
No.	Title	Length
1.	"The Quiet Things That No One Ever Knows"	4:04
2.	"Car" (Built to Spill cover)	2:36
3.	"Moshi Moshi" (Acoustic)	3:23

DVD
No.	Title	Length
1.	"The Quiet Things That No One Ever Knows"
2.	"The Boy Who Blocked His Own Shot" (Acoustic Session - Audio)

7" single (Limited Edition First Pressing)
No.	Title	Length
1.	"The Quiet Things That No One Ever Knows"
2.	"Jude Law and a Semester Abroad" (Early Recording Session)

7" single (Second Pressing on Green Vinyl)
No.	Title	Length
1.	"The Quiet Things That No One Ever Knows"
2.	"The No Seatbelt Song" (Live at CBGB's)

== Personnel ==
Brand New

- Jesse Lacey – vocals, rhythm guitar
- Vincent Accardi – lead guitar
- Garrett Tierney – bass
- Brian Lane – drums, percussion

== Charts ==
Chart (2003–2004)	Peak position
Scotland Singles (OCC)	41
UK Singles (OCC)	39
UK Rock & Metal (OCC)	4
US Alternative Airplay (Billboard)	37
