= Brand New (band) =

American rock band

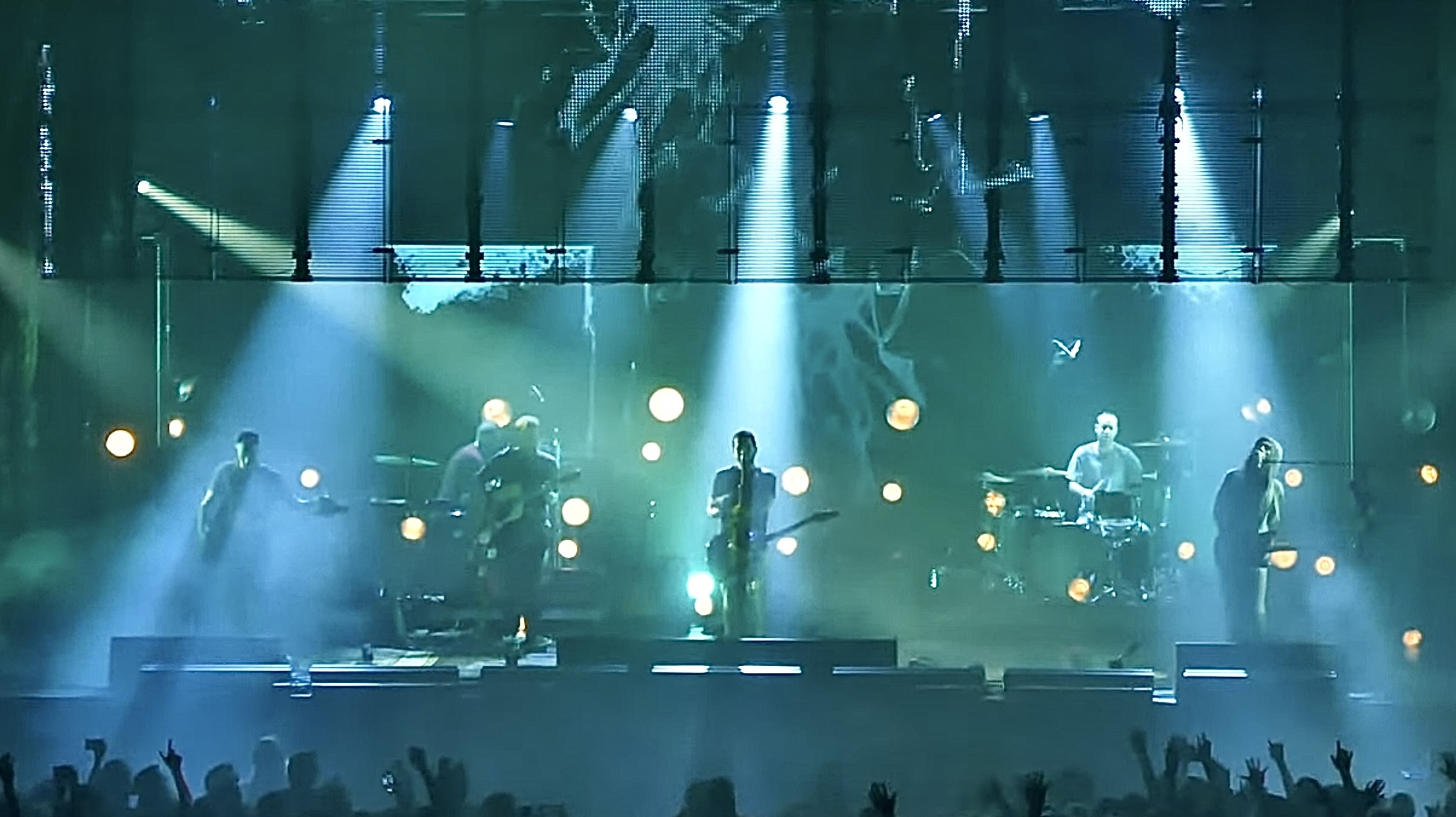
- Brand New performing in 2017

Background information
- Origin: Long Island, New York, U.S.
- Genres: Alternative rock; emo; indie rock; post-hardcore; pop-punk (early)
- Works: Discography; songs
- Years active: 2000–2017; 2024–present
- Labels: Tiny Evil; DreamWorks; Interscope; Triple Crown; Iodine; Razor & Tie; Procrastinate! Music Traitors
- Spinoff of: Taking Back Sunday
- Members: Vincent Accardi; Jesse Lacey; Brian Lane; Garrett Tierney
- Past members: Derrick Sherman
- Website: fightoffyourdemons.com

Brand New is an American rock band formed in 2000 from Long Island, New York. Consisting of lead vocalist and rhythm guitarist Jesse Lacey, lead guitarist Vincent Accardi, bassist Garrett Tierney and drummer Brian Lane, the band earned critical recognition as one of the most influential emo bands, and was acclaimed for their musical development and artistic innovation compared to other groups in the scene from which they originated.

In the 1990s, Lacey, Tierney and Lane played in the Levittown band the Rookie Lot, and Brand New was formed with Accardi after Lacey left his position as the founding bassist for Taking Back Sunday. The band signed to Triple Crown Records and released a pop-punk debut album Your Favorite Weapon. The band began to incorporate indie rock influences on their second album Deja Entendu, released in 2003 to positive reviews over the band's stylistic changes. Its two singles "The Quiet Things That No One Ever Knows" and "Sic Transit Gloria... Glory Fades" both entered the top 40 on the UK Singles Chart. Deja Entendu was eventually certified Gold in the US.

The demos for the band's major label debut on Interscope Records were leaked onto the internet in 2006. After reworking the material, the band released The Devil and God Are Raging Inside Me, which earned retrospective critical acclaim for its influence on emo. It was also certified Gold in the US, and the single "Jesus Christ" peaked at number 30 on Billboard's Alternative Songs chart. Accardi's role as a lyricist increased on the band's fourth album Daisy (2009), which debuted at number six on the Billboard 200 and featured a more post-hardcore and noise rock sound.

While Brand New toured consistently and played several prominent festivals, the band went six years without releasing music before the singles "Mene" (2015) and "I Am a Nightmare" (2016) surfaced. Brand New's fifth and most recent album, Science Fiction, was surprise-released in August 2017 through the band's own record label, Procrastinate! Music Traitors. It debuted at number-one on the Billboard 200, receiving both critical acclaim and commercial success. The band repeatedly announced plans to break up in 2018, but remained inactive for seven years without an official announcement of a breakup in the wake of 2017 sexual misconduct allegations against Lacey. The band reunited in 2024 for a charity show, followed by a US and UK tour in 2025.

== History ==
=== Formation and Your Favorite Weapon (2000–2002) ===
In the late 1990s, Jesse Lacey, Garrett Tierney and Brian Lane were all members of the Levittown, New York post-hardcore band the Rookie Lot, along with Brandon Reilly and Alex Dunne of Crime in Stereo. The Rookie Lot split and did not play for a while until Lacey, Lane and Tierney started to rehearse again. After Reilly joined The Movielife, they recruited guitarist Vincent Accardi from the band One Last Goodbye. The quartet all lived within ten minutes of each other.

All four members had backgrounds linking into their local Long Island independent and hardcore music scenes, but with influences ranging from Buddy Rich to Archers of Loaf. Brand New was officially formed in 2000 in a basement in Merrick, New York. Their initial intention was always to "move outside of whatever notions they felt inclined to when they were making music as younger people." The band gained exposure in the local scene through playing shows with alternative rock contemporaries Midtown and post-hardcore bands like Glassjaw, while also self-releasing a four-song demo. The band's first show was at the Garden City bowling alley as the opener for Long Island hardcore band Silent Majority.

Brand New signed to Triple Crown Records just after their second-ever show. The band had released a demo for Warner Bros. Records, but the label did not believe that the band had a hit single in their catalog that was worth signing them for. In response, Lacey immediately wrote "Last Chance to Lose Your Keys" at the label office to serve as their single, but Warner Bros. declined to make an offer and Brand New ended up with Triple Crown instead.

Lane and Reilly came up with the band name Brand New, which Lacey said was "somewhat in jest because nothing about the band is really that new... we weren't trying to break ground with a new kind of sound or anything." Later, Lacey said that interpretation was not his original intention, claiming that "a friend of ours said he would call his band Brand New but he never got a new band so we took it. I wish it were something as clever as a sarcastic take on the state of music."

Brand New's debut studio album Your Favorite Weapon was produced by friend of the band Mike Sapone. The album has been described as being "bitter about ex-girlfriends", with an excessive concentration on "post-breakup angst". It received relatively positive reviews, with AllMusic awarding it three out of five and PopMatters also being favorable. It became a moderate success, selling over 50,000 copies. The record deal gave Brand New the opportunity to tour, playing alongside the likes of Taking Back Sunday and touring the UK in support of Finch, to a "great response" from the crowds. The band also played the first edition of the UK's Download Festival in 2003.

The only single released from Your Favorite Weapon was "Jude Law and a Semester Abroad". The song has been described by AllMusic as a "semi-hit" after it received airplay on both MTV2 and Fuse.

==== Feud with Taking Back Sunday ====
During their early years, Brand New was involved in a highly publicized feud with fellow Long Island band Taking Back Sunday. Lacey was Taking Back Sunday's founding bassist and close friends with the band's guitarist John Nolan since fourth grade, with Nolan teaching Lacey how to play the guitar in high school. Nolan allegedly participated in an affair with Lacey's girlfriend at a house party, causing Lacey to leave Taking Back Sunday and eventually form Brand New. Brand New released the first song about the incident in 2001, "Seventy Times 7", named after the number of sins Jesus said one should be forgiven for, where Lacey wished death upon Nolan. Taking Back Sunday responded on 2002's "There's No 'I' in Team", where Nolan and frontman Adam Lazzara alternate vocals and directly quote lyrics from "Seventy Times 7".

Brand New then released a shirt reading "Because mics are for singing, not swinging", insulting Lazzara's signature stage antics which once injured their bassist to the point of needing stitches. Taking Back Sunday followed with their own "Proudly swinging since 1999" shirt. The two bands toured together in 2002 and Lacey joined Taking Back Sunday on stage in Boulder, Colorado to perform "There's No 'I' in Team". Nolan also performed with Brand New. However, the feud was still unresolved. Nolan left Taking Back Sunday in 2003 after Lazzara cheated on Nolan's sister, leading Lacey to reconcile with Nolan and allegedly insult Taking Back Sunday at concerts again. In a December 2003 interview with Alternative Press, Lacey said, "We did something silly like write something about them on a T-shirt, and they took it so personally, going as far as to call our friends and physically threaten us... We wish Taking Back Sunday the best as a band, but I don't wish many good things on some people in the band." Nolan also wrote an apology song to Lacey with his new project Straylight Run, "Your Name Here (Sunrise Highway)", which was released in 2004. The lyrics gave rough directions to Nolan's house at the time in Massapequa, offering Lacey to come visit him.

Taking Back Sunday guitarist Eddie Reyes told New York Magazine in 2004 that he was dissatisfied with his band being considered second-place to Brand New in the Long Island rock scene. In 2015, Lazzara rekindled the feud by calling Lacey a "dick" in an interview.

=== Deja Entendu, acclaim and label bidding war (2003–2004) ===
Brand New's second studio album was written in the "year and-a-half or two years" that they were touring the material off of Your Favorite Weapon. According to drummer Brian Lane, "Jesse [Lacey] wrote a lot of the lyrics about different things than 'I just broke up with my girlfriend' for the new record," on an acoustic guitar in his bedroom. Lane also said the band's music tastes continued to expand, and that unlike their debut, a lot of time and concentration went into making the album. "I'm surprised that so many bands just keep putting out the same record as they did previously. We try to flex as much of our diversity muscles... as we can," Lacey said about growing the band's sound. Before the album was even released, the band sold out three shows of a 24-date US headlining tour with Moneen, Senses Fail, and The Beautiful Mistake solely off word-of-mouth and Internet message board hype. The band also earned a slot on the 2003 Warped Tour and as openers for Dashboard Confessional.

Deja Entendu was released through Razor & Tie/Triple Crown Records on June 17, 2003. It began to receive international releases four months later. The album's title literally translates to "already heard" in French. It debuted at number 63 on the Billboard 200. After just seven weeks, the album's sales were at more than 51,000 copies, already closing in on the total figure of its predecessor. In May 2007, four years after its release, it was certified Gold for surpassing 500,000 sales in the United States by the Recording Industry Association of America.

The album's two singles, "The Quiet Things That No One Ever Knows" and "Sic Transit Gloria... Glory Fades", helped give the band exposure in the mainstream in contrast to how Your Favorite Weapon went "virtually unnoticed". Their music videos found "constant" airplay on MTV, and the band made its live television debut on Jimmy Kimmel Live!, performing "The Quiet Things That No One Ever Knows". Both singles entered the top 40 on the UK Singles Chart and "The Quiet Things That No One Ever Knows" peaked at number 37 on Billboard's Alternative Songs chart. In the wake of Deja Entendu, Brand New was pegged as an act to watch in Rolling Stone's annual "Hot Issue." The band topped punk critics' year-end lists with the "genre-defying" Deja Entendu, and the album was described as a "landmark album of so-called 'emo-punk'."

Following the album's release, Brand New sold out a headlining tour of the UK in January 2004 supported by Straylight Run, opened for Blink-182 in an arena tour of Australia, opened for Incubus in an arena tour of the UK and was slated to headline New Jersey's The Bamboozle festival in 2005 before canceling because of a member's health issues.

==== Changing labels ====
As a result of both Deja Entendu's success and the band's notable underground following, Brand New found itself in the middle of a bidding war from record labels. At the time, drummer Brian Lane disagreed with the usage of the phrase "bidding war", but conceded, "There's a few labels that are definitely interested. We've been talking to a lot of people for a while and we're narrowing it down." Following the album's success, Triple Crown Records knew that they had no chance of re-signing Brand New at the conclusion of their two-album deal. Lyor Cohen, at the time the president of The Island Def Jam Music Group, asked Thursday vocalist Geoff Rickly to speak positively about Island Records to Lacey in order to convince Brand New to sign with them. However, Lacey did not believe Rickly, as he noted how the label had told Thursday to rewrite their album War All the Time in order to placate the executives and did not want that happening to Brand New as well.

Michael Goldstone, who at the time was leaving DreamWorks Records for Sire Records, told Interscope Records executive Luke Wood to sign Brand New; Wood recalled that "for about six months, every label was trying to sign the band, chasing them all over the world. It was brutal." Vagrant Records made a hard push, but Brand New wanted total creative control in order to distance themselves from the emo scene following the success of Deja Entendu. Lacey was interested in the music of Pinback, Archers of Loaf and Neutral Milk Hotel.

The band eventually signed with DreamWorks Records, which was then taken over by Interscope Records.

=== The Devil and God Are Raging Inside Me and continued acclaim (2005–2007) ===
Following their signing to Interscope, Brand New stopped touring to work on their third album and major label debut. In this time, little to no interviews or updates came from the band. In 2004, Jesse Lacey told Chart magazine that he had written a "few songs" for the next album, commenting that "the other guys love it already", and acknowledged suffering from depression because of the pressure to deliver on the anticipation surrounding the band.

"I was also worried that it would derail the process because the four of us had created a pretty safe place where the only critics were ourselves. As much as we tried to shield ourselves from letting the leak affect us, it definitely did. There was a feeling of being robbed, after keeping everything so close to ourselves and then having it heard before it was completed."

— Brand New guitarist Vincent Accardi speaking about the leak of the demos

In late 2005, Brand New started recording their third album in Oxford, Mississippi with producer Dennis Herring, but later dropped him in favor of Mike Sapone with whom they had worked on their first album. On January 24, 2006, nine tracks recorded for the album were leaked to the Internet. Lacey was upset, saying, "No one likes to show their creation in mid-process, and those songs weren't done. They were like blueprints. Just the plan, right? It put me in a state where I was under the impression that those songs had been wasted or something—that we had to go and write new things because those had been heard."

On June 20, 2006, Brand New performed for the first time in two years at the Starland Ballroom in New Jersey, also announcing that their third album had been completed the day prior. Alternative Press claimed the album would come out on October 10, 2006, before the band corrected the date to November 21, 2006, in North America, and the day before in Europe. The band revealed that musician Derrick Sherman, who was brought in to "complete the sound on stage", contributed parts to every song on the album, and that drummer Brian Lane "easily consider[ed] him part of the band".

On October 5, Brand New announced the title, The Devil and God Are Raging Inside Me, and its track listing. Lead single "Sowing Season" debuted on the radio on October 19 and appeared on their MySpace page a day later. In a BBC Radio 1 interview with Zane Lowe, Lacey explained that the album's title came from a conversation he had with a friend about the musician Daniel Johnston, who suffered from bipolar disorder. The Devil and God Are Raging Inside Me has since become Brand New's most critically acclaimed album and is considered one of the best albums of the 2000s.

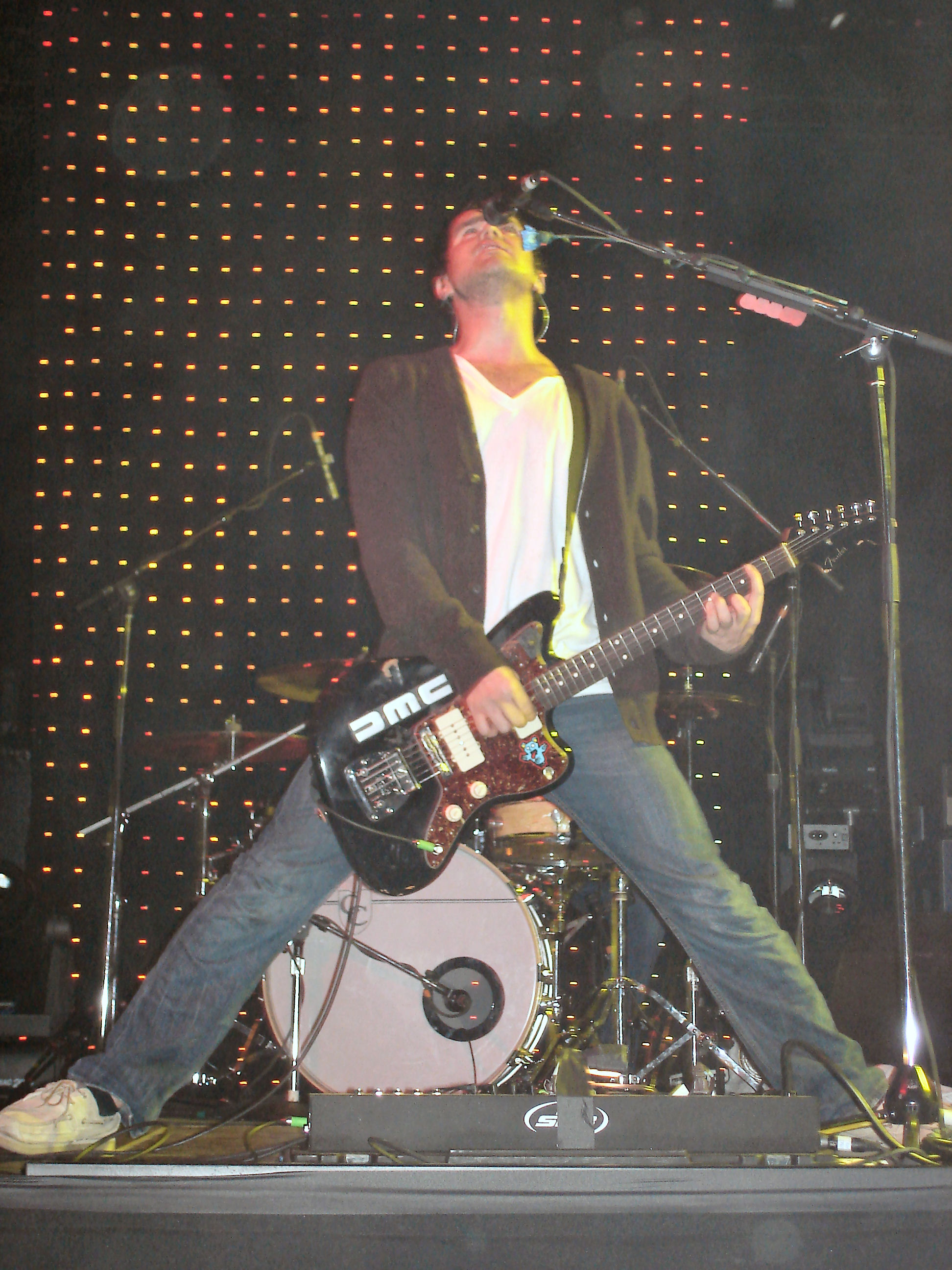
Jesse Lacey performing in Toronto during December 2006.

In late December 2006, a music video was released for the instrumental track "Untitled", also known as "-", which consists of a man spray-painting the phrase "evil and good are raging inside me" onto a wall before correcting it to read the album title. On January 16, 2007, "Jesus Christ" was announced as the next official single from the album. It peaked at number 30 on Billboard's Alternative Songs chart, becoming Brand New's biggest hit. On January 19, the band performed the song on Late Night with Conan O'Brien. They performed it again on February 26 on the Late Show with David Letterman. Despite the band's reluctance towards the press around the time of the release of the album, they were featured in Alternative Press, a cover story for Rock Sound, Kerrang!, and NME.

Brand New also added a second live drummer, Benjamin Homola, who had been the band's drum tech since 2004 and would go on to join bands including Bad Books, Twin Forks and Grouplove. The band first opened for Dashboard Confessional in a fall 2006 arena tour of the US. Brand New toured extensively in 2007 to promote the album, first headlining an international tour of Europe before also playing festivals such as Reading and Leeds, Lowlands and Pukkelpop. In the US, the band was supported by Manchester Orchestra and Kevin Devine on a spring tour and had Thrice and MewithoutYou open a fall tour. In early 2008, Brand New toured Australia and New Zealand on the Big Day Out festival.

=== Daisy (2008–2009) ===
In March 2008, Brand New started their own record label, Procrastinate! Music Traitors. The first act signed to the new label was longtime friend Kevin Devine. The first release from the label was a reissue of the 2006 Kevin Devine album, Put Your Ghost to Rest, in April 2008.

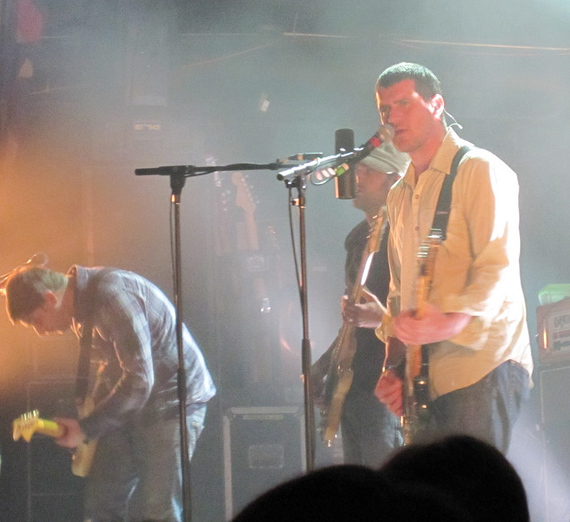
Brand New performing in San Diego, California on October 20, 2009.

In October 2008, Crime in Stereo's Alex Dunne revealed that Brand New were finishing the recording of a new album. In December, Brand New announced on their website that they had been in the studio since March and had roughly 15 tracks to choose from. On February 17, 2009, Brand New officially added touring guitarist Derrick Sherman to the band's full lineup. Sherman had toured with the band since 2006 and contributed to The Devil and God Are Raging Inside Me.

Brand New performed at the Glastonbury Festival on June 28, 2009, debuting two new songs tentatively titled "Bride" and "Gasoline" and delaying the release of their album to October. Brand New also played the main stage at the Reading and Leeds Festivals in August 2009. The band's sets at Reading and Glastonbury were both filmed by the BBC, but the band declined the BBC rights to broadcast either performance on television or online.

On July 7, 2009, Brand New announced their fourth album, And One Head Can Never Die (stylized in all lowercase), would be released on September 22, 2009, through Interscope Records. Two days later, the band changed the album's title to Daisy. The lead single "At the Bottom" was released digitally on August 11. Daisy saw frontman Jesse Lacey step away from his role as the band's primary lyricist, now sharing the duties with guitarist Vincent Accardi. The album debuted at number six on the Billboard 200 in the United States, selling 46,000 records in its first week.

Brand New announced a North American tour to promote Daisy, with opening acts including Coheed and Cambria, Manchester Orchestra, Thrice and Glassjaw. A concert at their hometown Nassau Coliseum sold over 6,000 tickets in the first day. The band played its largest UK concert yet on January 23, 2010, headlining London's Wembley Arena in front of 12,500 people supported by Glassjaw and Thrice.

=== Gap between albums (2009–2017) ===
After the release of Daisy, Lacey denied rumors about it being the band's final album, but said "it might be our last full-length record for a little while." Writing sessions for the band's fifth album began in 2009, shortly after its predecessor's release. Discussing the band's musical direction, Lacey believed Daisy "was like the end of a road". Drummer Brian Lane said in early 2010 that with the rise of digital music releases, the band could put out a new song on a weekly or monthly basis instead of via full albums.

On April 28, 2010, Brand New announced at their show in Clifton Park, New York that the band had parted ways with Interscope Records and was independent for the first time in their career. On November 21, 2011, the band reissued their debut album Your Favorite Weapon with new artwork and bonus tracks. The band was booked to enter a recording studio in April 2012, however, the members ultimately used this time for personal musical projects as opposed to recording Brand New. In June 2013, the band cancelled their upcoming European summer tour, including a main stage performance slot at the Reading and Leeds Festivals, due to "insurmountable personal issues".

On June 19, 2014, Brand New announced that the band had been writing and recording new material, as well as building their own studio. Brand New played a co-headlining show with Modest Mouse at New York City's Forest Hills Stadium on August 9, 2014, only the third show at the venue in the last 15 years.

Brand New debuted a new song, listed on the setlist as "Don't Feel Anything", on April 8, 2015, at the Fillmore Auditorium in Denver. The song was retitled "Mene" and made available as a free download through the band's website on April 13, the band's first new release in six years. A second new song, "Sealed to Me", was debuted at the Shrine Auditorium in Los Angeles on April 15. That month, Brand New played Coachella for the first time, which Pitchfork noted was part of a landmark moment for emo bands being allowed to play traditionally indie rock-oriented festivals. The band also added a few European summer dates, including an appearance at Barcelona's Primavera Sound festival. Brand New allowed their performances at Lollapalooza in Berlin on September 13, 2015, and Austin City Limits in Austin, Texas on October 3, 2015, to be broadcast. This was a first for the band, as Lacey previously stated the band was not comfortable recording their live sets.

In September 2015, an image of controversial medicine price-gouger Martin Shkreli wearing a Brand New shirt circulated on the internet. The band responded by putting the shirt on sale and donating all its proceeds to the Whitman-Walker Health center, which specializes in HIV/AIDS and LGBT healthcare.

On December 2, 2015, the band officially released the leaked demos to The Devil and God Are Raging Inside Me, which had popularly become known as Fight Off Your Demons among the fanbase, under the title Leaked Demos 2006. Its first release was on a limited-edition red cassette tape with a digital download card included. On January 29, 2016, the band's label Procrastinate! Music Traitors revealed a list of the year's upcoming releases, including a new Brand New album. On May 17, 2016, Brand New released another new single, "I Am a Nightmare", which was released to acclaim including a "Best New Track" honor from Pitchfork.

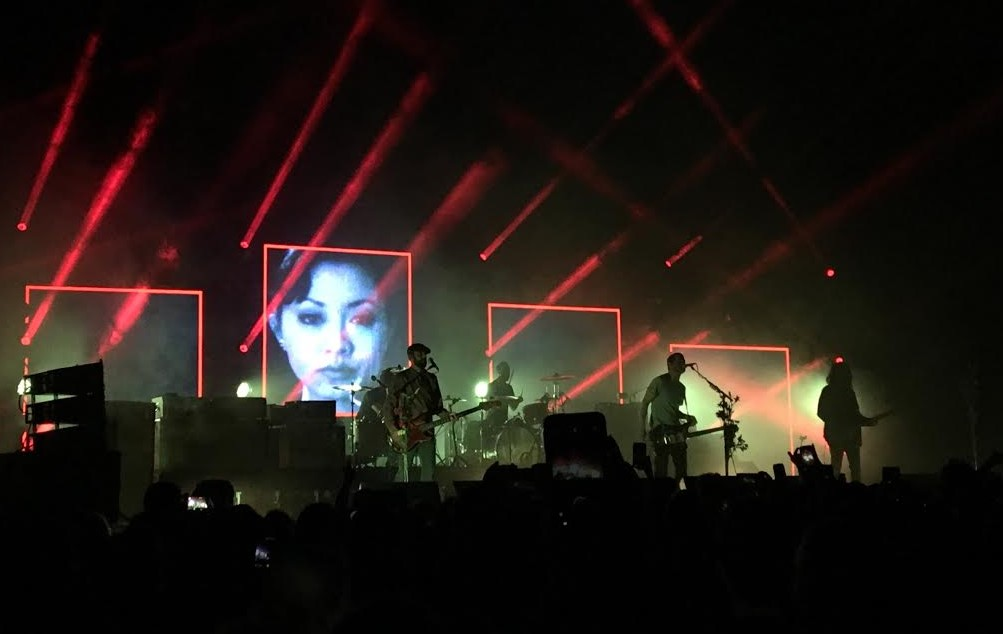
Brand New performing at Bon Secours Wellness Arena in Greenville, South Carolina on November 8, 2016.

In June 2016, Brand New began a co-headlining United States tour with Modest Mouse, which included a stop at New York City's iconic Madison Square Garden. On July 13, 2016, the band released an EP called 3 Demos, Reworked. The EP contains re-recorded versions of 3 songs that appear on Leaked Demos 2006. On July 22, 2016, the band released a physical 7" single of "Mene" with the b-side "Out of Range," a previously unreleased song that had been leaked in 2010.

On September 26, 2016, the band revealed that the latest album that had previously been promised to fans would not be released in 2016. The band felt that the songs on the album were incomplete and needed more time to be deemed finalized. The band also announced that it would be celebrating the 10-year anniversary of The Devil and God are Raging Inside Me by playing it in its entirety during a fall 2016 tour of the US. In November and December 2016, Brand New supported Biffy Clyro on an arena tour of the UK.

==== Breakup speculation ====
In April 2015, Brand New began sending out lyric booklets for The Devil and God are Raging Inside Me to fans who followed the liner notes' instructions to mail the band $1 for lyrics nine years ago. The booklet, named Pogolith 000, also contained a poster alluding to the release of the band's previously unreleased 2005 Fight Off Your Demons demos on cassette tape, as well as a postcard with the words "rip 2018", sparking rumors of a possible breakup of the band. As part of Record Store Day 2015, the band re-released Deja Entendu as a limited vinyl, accompanied by Pogolith 00, a booklet containing the lyrics to the album. A standard edition, non-limited vinyl was made available on May 5, 2015. Both Pogolith 000 and Pogolith 00 were later made available at shows and through the band's online store.

On October 11, 2015, during a tour-ending performance at Ryman Auditorium, Lacey told the audience that "this isn't going to last much longer". He spoke about his friendships with the band, the possibility of a new album, and how he would soon be a father. During their summer 2016 tour, the band released new shirt designs which read "2000–2018". One of them was projected onto the stage after the band's set at the Vogue Theatre in Vancouver on June 2, increasing speculation that Brand New planned to break up in 2018. On June 28 in Salt Lake City, Lacey said between songs, "We’re done. Oh yeah, we’re done, and it makes nights like this all the more special so thanks for being here." In September 2016, when Brand New announced that their fifth studio album would not be released that year as originally scheduled, the band issued more statements alluding to the band's end: "What's left should be a strange demise, but hopefully one as loud and as fun as the rest of our time together has been. All are invited. Please send flowers."

=== Science Fiction and disbandment (2017–2018) ===
On August 15, 2017, the band announced on Instagram that their fifth LP would be released on vinyl in October 2017. Two days later on August 17, many people who had pre-ordered the vinyl edition of the album received a CD (limited to 500) in the post that contained an album in its entirety, named Science Fiction, compressed into one 61-minute long track. The album was later put up for sale on their website confirming it as their fifth LP. Science Fiction was met with widespread critical acclaim and commercial success, as it became Brand New's first album to debut at number one on the Billboard 200.

On September 13, 2017, Kevin Devine announced via Facebook that he would be taking time off of his own project, Kevin Devine and the Goddamn Band, to join Brand New on their Science Fiction tour as an additional guitarist and vocalist. Nada Surf, a band Lacey has professed himself a fan of, served as the opening act for the tour. During a performance in October 2017, Lacey further confirmed the band's end, stating "We’re gonna be a band for about 14 more months, so thank you so much for being here tonight."

In November 2017, Lacey was accused of sexual misconduct occurring during the early and mid-2000s with allegedly underage fans. Lacey issued a public apology on Brand New's Facebook page, prompting touring guitarist Kevin Devine and supporting act Martha to pull out of the upcoming European tour dates. The band later announced the postponement of all of their upcoming tour dates, which were not rescheduled. Aside from a few meetings at guitarist Accardi's Joshua Tree home and at a Texas studio, they remained publicly inactive since November 2017, neither confirming nor denying the break-up of the band.

On December 31, 2018, a track rumored to be titled "Simple Man", alleged to have been made prior to The Devil and God Are Raging Inside Me, was leaked onto the internet.

On October 25, 2021, John D'Esposito, the founder of The Bamboozle musical festival, revealed that he had attempted to convince Brand New to reform and play the 2023 edition of the festival, but the band declined his request.

=== Reunion (2024–present) ===
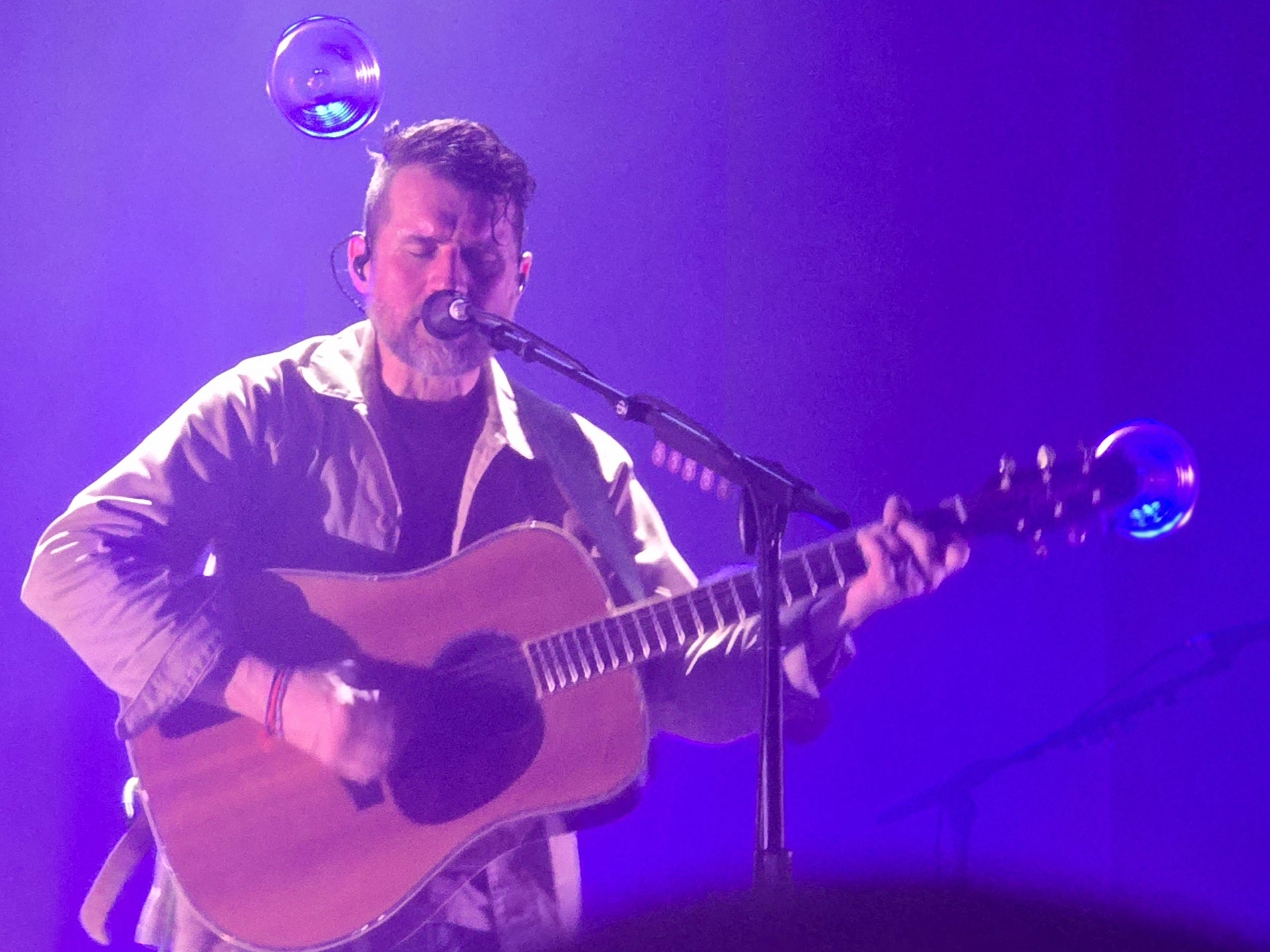
Lacey performing with Brand New in 2025

On December 15, 2024, the band reunited at a private charity event for friends and family at the Eastside Bowl in Nashville. The event comes approximately one year after Lacey performed solo at the same venue, also at the time limited to friends and family members. On March 2, 2025, Lacey performed a public solo show in Nashville where he debuted new songs, including music written about the recent death of his stepson. On March 3, the band announced three shows, their first public concerts since breaking up. Their return to the stage took place on March 26 at The Bomb Factory in Dallas, which was the last venue they played before the breakup. On March 31, Brand New announced a 24-date tour of the US, including a hometown dates at New York-area arenas UBS Arena and Prudential Center. The band also announced a UK tour for November 2025. The announcements did not go without backlash from fans who were taken aback by Lacey's misconduct allegations. Additionally, multiple outlets reported that every music venue that had booked the band on the tour had disabled comments on social media posts that promoted the events.

In June 2026, the band announced a 20-year anniversary tour for The Devil and God Are Raging Inside Me in the US during the fall.

== Artistry ==
=== Musical style ===
Brand New is most often described as emo, indie rock, and alternative rock, with their debut album Your Favorite Weapon described as pop-punk.

AllMusic labeled the band as a "Long Island outfit that began playing punk-pop and emo, but gradually embraced indie rock influences." In 2017, Billboard described Brand New as "less a product of the old Long Island pop-punk scene they'll frustratingly always be tied to, but more a part of a lineage of constantly-shape-shifting, steadfastly fascinating experimental rock bands, which famously includes Radiohead, but also the likes of Talk Talk, Swans, the Fall and a disparate many others."

Following the band's third album, music publications began to liken Brand New musically to an American version of Radiohead, which was amplified by the band's discomfort with media and reluctance to release singles. Lacey's response in 2007 was, "I don't think that comparison is very fair to Radiohead. The way they balance their mainstream appeal with complete coolness, these are elements that every band should strive for. But at the same time, that tag comes with a lot of pressure."

The band has had a mixed relationship with the emo label. "I think emo started on this single-faceted idea of, 'I was hurt by someone else' ... but it's only a small part of the entire spectrum of emotion that people go through. Unfortunately, the struggle against this trend of music we were grouped in with has become a large part of our band," Lacey said in 2004. He also said, "I honestly despise the content of most of the songs from most of the bands that we've toured with in the last two years." In 2005, he said of the Long Island emo scene, "You have all these middle-class white kids making music now, and that's never been a place where great music comes from." Long Island concert promoter Christian McKnight said that "they never really had the scene association like Taking Back Sunday, and I think a lot of that was by choice. They became more brooding and isolated, and they weren't part of the bigger scene at large." Pitchfork wrote that "The Devil and God Are Raging Inside Me is not an emo record. It might actually be post-emo."

The band has rejected the pop-punk label outside of Your Favorite Weapon, an album which the band is "somewhat ashamed of". Drummer Brian Lane said, "We're not a pop punk band. The first record I can easily see it. The second record, there's nothing on it that says pop punk whatsoever... I don't hear any influences of NOFX or anything like that." Many reviews of Deja Entendu compared Brand New to Bright Eyes, which Lane said was "better than being compared to New Found Glory... that group of bands is getting old very quick and played out." Lacey criticized mainstream pop punk in a 2003 Rolling Stone interview, referring to it as music "about how we've been wronged and got our hearts broken and nobody understands," and said that Brand New would be following in Radiohead's footsteps rather than Good Charlotte's. About bands such as Fall Out Boy, Lacey said: "There are some bands that are gonna take a music course and some bands that take a business course... To me it seems very fashiony [sic] and false."

=== Influences ===
Brand New has listed a wide variety of bands as influences. The band was known for naming The Smiths and their frontman Morrissey as favorites, including a reference to them on "Mix Tape". Lacey taped the words "Hi Moz" to his guitar during the band's 2003 performance on Jimmy Kimmel Live!. Lacey has also cited English rock bands such as Ride, The Stone Roses and The Beatles as major influences. Brand New's noisier elements were influenced by adolescent favorites Sonic Youth and My Bloody Valentine. In 2005, Lacey said "I hope that Deja isn't our Loveless for anyone", regarding Brand New's potential for further growth.

While recording Deja Entendu, Lacey said his favorite band was Sigur Rós and also expressed a fandom of Mogwai. During the Daisy era, Lacey was influenced by Polvo, Archers of Loaf, Fugazi and Modest Mouse, Accardi cited Pearl Jam, Alice in Chains and Stone Temple Pilots while Tierney's bass playing emulated Hüsker Dü and The Jesus Lizard. Brand New also paid homage to The Jesus Lizard's album Goat with the single artwork for "Jesus Christ".

Brand New have toured with a number of their influences. Built to Spill opened for them in 2015, and the band embarked on a co-headlining tour with Modest Mouse in 2016. Alternative Press recalled watching Brand New guitarist Vin Accardi play Modest Mouse's "3rd Planet" prior to a show in August 2001, before the band even released their debut album. "At the time, it was pretty unusual to see a pop-punk band jamming out to an indie tastemaker, but five years later, it all makes sense."

== Legacy ==
Brand New is renowned as one of the most important and artistically driven bands in the emo genre. In Chris Payne's 2023 retrospective novel Where Are Your Boys Tonight?, he named Brand New "arguably the most innovative and critically acclaimed band of their scene." Consequence of Sound wrote, "Brand New ended the need to feel ashamed for connecting to emo." NPR Music believed that Brand New's indie rock sound "free[d] the band from emo's cultural stigma". Billboard described them as a "cult band".

Brand New are often contrasted with mainstream-leaning 2000s emo and pop punk bands for their musical progression, lyrical maturity and focus on artistry. The A.V. Club said that while their "peers were making plays for superstardom, Brand New made a sprawling, iconoclastic work of art, one that challenged conventions." Ryan Bassil of Noisey declared Brand New "the best band of a generation" and noted how they "have seemingly avoided every pitfall of the modern emo, alternative band and transcended to become something more; going beyond the music and smashing through the wall into what can only be described as art." Consequence of Sound named Brand New the ninth-best pop punk band of all time; writer Nina Corcoran opined that the band "haven't faded the way other 2000s pop punk acts have because their music is too well composed to be forgotten".

Music writers credited the eight-year gap between 2009's Daisy and 2017's Science Fiction for growing Brand New's legacy. Stereogum noted in 2015 how the indie rock community began to pay more attention to Brand New by detaching their image from the emo and pop punk scenes that they were "shepherded and pigeonholed into" as a result of their debut album. Steven Hyden praised the band's unique evolution from the "conventional pop-punk" of Your Favorite Weapon to the "emo Abbey Road" of Science Fiction. Ian Cohen of Pitchfork remarked, "popular guitar music in 2017 has been undeniably shaped by Brand New, a band who has served not just as damaged role models but as a formative musical influence." Spin declared that "Brand New didn't just became a band, they became a lifeline and sanctuary for thousands upon thousands of messed-up kids."

Brand New's influence on emo rap has also been noted. Lindsay Zoladz of The Ringer said in 2017 that "your future favorite rapper might be listening to Brand New right now." Emo rapper Lil Peep sampled Brand New's "The No Seatbelt Song" on his track "Crybaby".

Artists influenced by Brand New include Manchester Orchestra, mewithoutYou, Cymbals Eat Guitars, Citizen, Oso Oso, Amy Shark, Sorority Noise, You Me at Six, Moose Blood and The Xcerts. Pop singer Halsey cited the band as an inspiration, referring to both Deja Entendu and The Devil and God Are Raging Inside Me in particular as essential records in her life, and Lacey as "largely responsible for why I write with such detail." Demi Lovato has also expressed her admiration for the band.

Foxing lead singer Conor Murphy pointed to a motivational speech that Lacey gave the band before their first show opening for Brand New as a pivotal moment in the band's development. Cymbals Eat Guitars singer Joe D’Agostino said that opening for Brand New exposed the band to a wider audience that would not have discovered them had it not been for the tour. Thrice's 2015 reunion came about after band members witnessed an inspiring Brand New concert and conversed with the band about touring again.

== Band members ==
Current members

- Vincent Accardi – lead guitar, vocals (2000–2017, 2024–present)
- Jesse Lacey – lead vocals, rhythm guitar (2000–2017, 2024–present)
- Brian Lane – drums, percussion (2000–2017, 2024–present)
- Garrett Tierney – bass guitar, backing vocals (2000–2017, 2024–present)

=== Current touring members ===
- Sean Kirkpatrick – guitars, backing vocals (2025–present)
- Jill Greenlee – keyboards, backing vocals (2025–present)
- Chris Broome – drums, percussion (2025–present)

Former members

- Derrick Sherman – keyboards, guitar (2009–2013, touring and session member 2005–2009)

Former touring members

- Benjamin Homola – drums (2005–2017)
- Kevin Devine – guitars, backing vocals (2017)
- Jo Schornikow – keyboards (2025)

== Discography ==
Studio albums

- Your Favorite Weapon (2001)
- Deja Entendu (2003)
- The Devil and God Are Raging Inside Me (2006)
- Daisy (2009)
- Science Fiction (2017)
