= Your Favorite Weapon =

Studio album by Brand New
- Released: October 9, 2001
- Recorded: 2001; Magic Shop Recording Studios, Manhattan, New York; TomandAndy; Nada Studios, New Windsor, New York; Sapone Productions, New York
- Genres: Pop-punk; emo
- Length: 41:27
- Labels: Triple Crown; Razor & Tie; Procrastinate! Music Traitors
- Producers: Mike Sapone; Brand New

Brand New chronology
Your Favorite Weapon (2001)	Brand New / Safety in Numbers (2002)

Brand New studio chronology
Your Favorite Weapon (2001)	Deja Entendu (2003)

Singles from Your Favorite Weapon
- 1. "Jude Law and a Semester Abroad" Released: November 11, 2002

2011 Deluxe Edition Cover
- 10-year anniversary re-issue

Your Favorite Weapon (stylized as Your+Favorite+Weapon and Yourfavoriteweapon) is the debut studio album by American rock band Brand New, released in 2001. Recorded and released a year after the band's formation, the album consists of pop punk songs about the highs and lows of teenage life. Your Favorite Weapon received positive reviews from critics and sold over 315,000 copies.

== Background and recording ==
Vocalist/guitarist Jesse Lacey, bassist Garrett Tierney and drummer Brian Lane played in a band called The Rookie Lot with Brandon Reilly before the band eventually broke up. After a period of inactivity between Lacey, Tierney and Lane, the trio formed Brand New in Long Island, New York, in 2000. The name came from Lane and Reilly. Reilly went on to play in The Movielife. Shortly afterwards, Brand New acquired guitarist Vincent Accardi, who had previously played in One Last Goodbye. The band self-released a demo and started gaining attention outside of their home state after touring with Midtown and Glassjaw. Lane had a job working at a recording studio which the band would use to record material.

The band signed to Triple Crown after their second-ever show. Label founder and executive Fred Feldman was initially interested in the hardcore band Home Town Hero, which featured Tierney and Lane, but by the time he contacted Lane, the group had already broken up six months earlier. Instead, Brand New sent Feldman their demo. Lacey said the label was "excellent" for the band "in every way".

Your Favorite Weapon was produced by Mike Sapone, a friend of the band. All of the songs on the album were written during the band's teenage years "two or three years before" it was released, according to Accardi.

The entire album was re-recorded when the original recording was lost on a computer's hard drive. All of the songs on the band's demo were re-recorded for the album. The band later admitted that they did not like the overall sound of "Jude Law and a Semester Abroad", despite being the album's most popular song.

== Music and lyrics ==
Your Favorite Weapon was recorded in 2001. The sound of Your Favorite Weapon has been categorized musically as pop-punk and emo. The album consists largely of power chord-heavy songs. Asked about his influences, Lacey cited Lifetime, Foo Fighters, The Cars and The Smiths. The band listened to several bands while in their van, such as Saves the Day, Modest Mouse and Green Day.

The album's lyrics explore themes such as girls, romance, breakups and angst. Additionally, some of the album's lyrics and song titles draw from popular culture. "The Shower Scene" references actress Janet Leigh's story in the film Psycho. The title of "Jude Law and a Semester Abroad" references actor Jude Law. "Failure by Design" is about Lacey experiencing writer's block. "The No Seatbelt Song" was written by Lacey in the style of The Smiths, as "a reminder of the fact that we have some musical taste." "Seventy Times 7" was written about a feud between Lacey and Taking Back Sunday guitarist John Nolan. Nolan wrote about the feud from his point of view in Taking Back Sunday's "There's No 'I' in Team". The name of the song is a reference to a Bible passage, specifically Matthew 18:22. "Soco Amaretto Lime" was written for Lacey's friend Peter and about Lacey's girlfriend. Peter saw the band "the way we [...] have changed in the last couple years." People were giving Lacey's girlfriend "shit for wanting to be with me. [...] they were being spiteful, and old, and envious. [...] That's where the last lines in the song came from."

== Release ==
=== Original release and touring ===
Your Favorite Weapon was released through Triple Crown on October 9, 2001. (Note: U.S. Triple Crown 6469203031-2) Between late October and late November, Brand New toured the U.S. with support from The Reunion Show. In January and February 2002, they toured the U.S. with support from Further Seems Forever, Recover and Hot Rod Circuit. The band then went on a spring tour in May and early June with Finch, The Starting Line and Autopilot Off. The band went on a short tour with Dashboard Confessional in early June. In June, the band was supported by Thrice and Recover. In late June, Iodine Recordings released Your Favorite Weapon on vinyl along with an extra track, "...My Nine Rides Shotgun". (Note: U.S. Iodine Recordings IO05) A music video for "Jude Law and a Semester Abroad" was released through Much Music in July. It was filmed at Skate and Surf Festival. The band went on a summer tour with Taking Back Sunday and Rufio. In September, it was announced the band had re-recorded "Jude Law and a Semester Abroad" for a potential release to radio.

Brand New supported Face to Face for a week's worth of shows between late September and early October. The band then toured with The Movielife between mid October and early December, with support from The Reunion Show and Orange Island. In November, the band released the re-recorded version of "Jude Law and a Semester Abroad" on MP3.com. The album was released in the UK on March 10, 2003, through Eat Sleep. (Note: UK Eat Sleep EAT 022CD) Also in March, the band went on a tour of the UK with Finch. Between late April and early May, the band toured the U.S. with support by A Static Lullaby and Orange Island. Hot Rod Circuit was originally announced to support the band, before being replaced by The Early November. The band ended the touring cycle with a show in New York to a crowd of 5,000 people. "Jude Law and a Semester Abroad" was released as a single in the UK on June 2.

=== Reissues and legacy ===
On February 9, 2004, the album was released in Australia through Below Par. (Note: Australia Below Par PAR12) With the success of Brand New's second album, Deja Entendu (2003), Razor & Tie reissued Your Favorite Weapon on April 22. The album was reissued in Australia through Cortex on May 5, 2007. (Note: Australia Cortex CTX338CD) Triple Crown hosted a 10th anniversary show of the label in December 2007. At this show, the band played the album in full, with the exception of "Seventy Times 7" which was played as the encore; "Moshi Moshi" was played in its place. On November 29, 2011, Razor & Tie released a 10th anniversary edition of the album, with seven demos as bonus tracks and new cover art. (Note: U.S. Razor & Tie/Triple Crown 79301833262) The new cover art was taken by Derrick Sherman. A vinyl release followed on December 13. (Note: U.S. Triple Crown 3152) The band played the album in full again for New Year's Eve in 2011.

Over time, as Brand New's sound changed drastically, many songs from Your Favorite Weapon were phased out of their live shows. A 2004 interview with Kerrang! described the band as feeling "somewhat ashamed" of the album. At a 2006 show, Lacey said that he no longer agreed with many of the lyrics in album closer "Soco Amaretto Lime".

== Reception ==
Professional ratings
Review scores
Source	Rating
AbsolutePunk	Favorable
AllMusic	3/5 stars
Consequence of Sound	(favorable)
PopMatters	(favorable)
Punknews.org	4/5 stars
Sputnikmusic	4/5 stars

Your Favorite Weapon found "cult-like success", according to CMJ New Music Monthly. By July 2003, the album had sold 50,000 copies. Prior to the 2011 reissue, the album had sold over 315,000 copies. It received positive reviews from critics. The album was included at number 15 on Rock Sound's "The 51 Most Essential Pop Punk Albums of All Time" list. In 2013, BuzzFeed ranked it at number 6 on their "36 Pop Punk Albums You Need To Hear Before You F——ing Die" list. In 2014, NME listed the album as one of "20 Pop Punk Albums Which Will Make You Nostalgic". "Soco Amaretto Lime" was included on Alternative Press's "11 Classic Summer Jams" list in 2014. Rolling Stone ranked the album at number 29 on their 2019 list of the "40 Greatest Emo Albums of All Time".

== Track listing ==
All tracks are written by Brand New, except track 11 written by Brand New and John Nolan

No.	Title	Length
1.	"The Shower Scene"	2:24
2.	"Jude Law and a Semester Abroad"	3:41
3.	"Sudden Death in Carolina"	3:01
4.	"Mix Tape"	3:57
5.	"Failure by Design"	3:15
6.	"Last Chance to Lose Your Keys"	3:25
7.	"Logan to Government Center"	3:02
8.	"The No Seatbelt Song"	4:29
9.	"Seventy Times 7"	3:32
10.	"Secondary"	3:01
11.	"Magazines"	2:50
12.	"Soco Amaretto Lime"	4:46
Total length:		41:27

Bonus tracks

2001 vinyl tracks
No.	Title	Length
12.	"...My Nine Rides Shotgun"	3:16
13.	"Soco Amaretto Lime"	4:46

Japanese edition bonus track
No.	Title	Length
13.	"...My Nine Rides Shotgun"	3:16

10th anniversary edition bonus tracks
No.	Title	Length
13.	"Jude Law and a Semester Abroad" (2000 demo)	2:24
14.	"Secondary" (2000 demo)	2:47
15.	"Logan to Government Center" (2000 demo)	3:13
16.	"The Shower Scene" (2000 demo)	2:25
17.	"Logan to Government Center" (2000 throwaway demo)	3:23
18.	"Last Chance to Lose Your Keys" (2000 throwaway demo)	3:18
19.	"Magazines" (2000 throwaway demo)	3:05

== Personnel ==
- Jesse Lacey – vocals, rhythm guitar
- Vincent Accardi – lead guitar, backing vocals
- Garrett Tierney – bass
- Brian Lane – drums, percussion
