= Deja Entendu =

Studio album by Brand New
- Released: June 17, 2003
- Recorded: February 2003
- Studios: Reflection Sound Studios, Charlotte, North Carolina
- Genres: Emo; alternative rock; pop-punk; post-hardcore
- Length: 48:47
- Labels: Triple Crown; Razor & Tie
- Producers: Steven Haigler; Mike Sapone

Brand New chronology
Brand New / Safety in Numbers (2002)	Deja Entendu (2003)	The Holiday EP (2003)

Brand New studio chronology
Your Favorite Weapon (2001)	Deja Entendu (2003)	The Devil and God Are Raging Inside Me (2006)

Singles from Deja Entendu
- 1. "The Quiet Things That No One Ever Knows" Released: October 6, 2003; 2. "Sic Transit Gloria... Glory Fades" Released: February 2, 2004

Deja Entendu (French for "already heard") is the second studio album by American rock band Brand New; it was released on June 17, 2003, by Triple Crown Records and Razor & Tie. It was widely praised for showing the band's maturation from their pop-punk debut Your Favorite Weapon, and critics described the album as the moment when the band "started showing ambition to look beyond the emo/post-hardcore scene that birthed them."

The album, considered the band's "breakthrough", was Brand New's first to chart in the United States (at number 63), and its two singles "The Quiet Things That No One Ever Knows" and "Sic Transit Gloria... Glory Fades" both reached the top 40 in the United Kingdom Singles Chart and earned MTV airplay. It was certified Gold nearly four years after its release. Its commercial success led to Brand New signing with DreamWorks/Interscope Records shortly after.

The album received very positive reviews and has since been placed on numerous lists as one of the greatest albums of the decade and from the emo genre.

== Background ==
Brand New's second studio album was written in "the year-and-a-half or two years" that they were touring the material from Your Favorite Weapon. According to drummer Brian Lane, "Jesse [Lacey] wrote a lot of the lyrics about different things than 'I just broke up with my girlfriend' for the new record." Lacey wrote the songs on an acoustic guitar in his bedroom, saying that there was less "girl/guy stuff" in the lyrics and more about relationships between people.

During the album's recording, Lacey listened to more European bands, telling Rock Sound that "I'm really into Mogwai and Coldplay and I'm obsessed with the Smiths and Morrissey. But Sigur Rós is my favorite band right now, they can do no wrong," also remarking that "I couldn't listen to Blink-182 because we'd end up sounding like them."

"I'm surprised that so many bands just keep putting out the same record as they did previously. We try to flex as much of our diversity muscles… as we can," Lacey said about the band's development. Revolver felt that Brand New was trying to show people that "there's more to music than three-chord pop-punk and screaming infidelities."

The band wanted to include moments on Deja Entendu that drew from Radiohead and Sigur Rós, which Revolver claimed were "bands their fans have probably never heard." Lacey saw this as a gamble because of the pop-punk fanbase they received from Your Favorite Weapon, believing that "to be able to slip those sounds in... I thought everyone was going to hate it."

The album was produced by Steven Haigler.

=== Album title ===
Deja Entendu literally translates to "already heard" in French. Frontman Jesse Lacey told MTV that the title was a "tongue-in-cheek" commentary about the band's music, stating: "No matter who you are or what your band is about, you can't put a record out without people saying it's derivative of something else. So by saying the record's already been heard, it's kind of like saying, 'Yeah, you're right. We're doing something that's already been done before.' We're not trying to break new ground in music. We're just trying to make good music." He also said that bands like Sigur Rós and Outkast were uniquely "groundbreaking" as "there is new territory to be charted, but I don't necessarily think that we're the ones to be doing it."

=== Cover artwork ===
The cover art for Deja Entendu was designed by musicians Don and Ryan Clark of the band Demon Hunter, who ran the graphic design studio Invisible Creature. The band contacted the studio in early 2003 with just the album's title as a reference point, contacting the studio only once before receiving the final product. Don Clark said in 2015 that, "If I could go back, there are a zillion little things I would do differently. I was much younger (and greener) at the time, so some of the light and shadow work is a bit clunky." However, both Clark and DIY agreed that the cover became an "iconic image" for an album that "from a musical standpoint, was way ahead of its time."

== Lyrics and meaning ==
Lacey's lyrics on Deja Entendu explore themes such as psychological pain and youth. They were a response to his dissatisfaction with the lyrical content of pop punk bands such as Good Charlotte, which he believed focused too much on how other people wronged them. He sought to do something different by writing about how he had negatively impacted others. "I've hurt people just as often as I've been hurt. I'm trying to be honest about the kind of person I am underneath it all," he confided in an October 2003 interview with Rolling Stone. Drummer Brian Lane described the lyrics of Deja Entendu as Lacey "pointing out things about himself and others that he doesn’t think are that great."

Revolver wrote that Lacey's character writing was "populated by narcissists". Lacey said: "I came to the realization that I'm not any better than a lot of the people I'm writing about. I'm probably worse, and most of the people I know are also. All these bands are singing about this night after night, to all these crying kids who are loving every second of it. But I'm seeing these people when they come offstage, and the stuff they're doing to the people they say they care about is appalling!"

Reflecting on the lyrics in a 2005 interview, Lacey opined that they were mostly written about situations that he knew. "Being white and middle-class is a very shallow thing to draw from," he said. "You can very easily start whining about things that really aren't relevant to very many people. It's important to me that they come out on a very large scale. Listening to Springsteen or Morrissey or Bono – they are all very universal lyricists, and they all say things that I wish I could say. But I really can't write about anything else. Even if I'm writing about an experience in someone else's life, I'm only going to be able to write about it if I'm very close to it. I have to have a good perspective on it. There wasn't much about anyone else."

Several of the song titles reference films. The first track entitled "Tautou" references the lead actress, Audrey Tautou, in the movie Amélie. "Okay I Believe You, But My Tommy Gun Don't" is a line from Home Alone 2: Lost in New York, and "Sic Transit Gloria...Glory Fades" is a quote from Wes Anderson's film Rushmore. In addition, the line "And I've seen what happens to the wicked and proud when they decide to try to take on the throne for the crown" (from "Jaws Theme Swimming") is a reference to a line from the 1999 film Dogma, specifically referencing a line of Matt Damon's character Loki. "I Will Play My Game Beneath the Spin Light" is a quote from the Bruce Brooks sports novel The Moves Make the Man, and borrows lines from the song "Chumming the Ocean" by the band Archers of Loaf.

"Me vs. Maradona vs. Elvis" is a song that Lacey describes as being about his worst nightmare, turning into a washed-up figure after his prime has ended. The title draws a comparison to Elvis Presley, who died from a drug overdose, and Diego Maradona, who suffered from drug addiction and was accused of domestic violence.

"Guernica", whose title references the Picasso painting of the same name, was written about Lacey's grandfather and his struggle with cancer. Lacey felt guilty about how the band's recording commitments meant that he could not return home to be by his side. "It was a horrible circumstance and I felt very selfish and very bad about the whole thing," he told Rock Sound.

"Good to Know That If I Ever Need Attention All I Have to Do Is Die" criticizes the music industry and "when managers, labels, agents and lawyers get their claws on the prize money". The title came from something that a friend of Lacey said after false rumors of his death created concern among people he had not spoken to in years. "As the band grows, everyone wants to take a piece of us," he said.

The song "Play Crack the Sky" was about the 1951 shipwreck of the FV Pelican at Montauk Point, New York where 45 people died within a mile of the lighthouse. Lacey claimed the song "touches on parts of life that I don't talk about a lot [...] I have grown up around water being from living on Long Island. Surfing, sailing, fishing, that's a huge part of my life apart from the band." The ending of the song is a reference to the run-out groove on the Beatles' Sgt. Pepper's Lonely Hearts Club Band (1967). During a show on his 2007 solo tour with Kevin Devine, Jesse explained that the title was a reference to Mylon LeFevre song "Crack the Sky".

== Release ==
Deja Entendu was released through Triple Crown and Razor & Tie on June 17, 2003. "The Quiet Things That No One Ever Knows" was released as the album's lead single to rock radio on October 6. It peaked at No. 39 on the UK Singles Chart and No. 37 on Billboard's Alternative Songs in the US. The album was released in the UK on October 13, through Eat Sleep. On November 3, the album was released in Australia through Below Par. "Sic Transit Gloria... Glory Fades" was released to radio on November 18 as the album's second single. It reached No. 37 in the UK. The first pressing for the album in 2003 was 1,000 records.

On March 2, 2015, the band announced a reissue of the album. It was first released for Record Store Day on April 18 in limited packaging before a wider release on May 5. Both were pressed on 180-gram black vinyl.

== Commercial performance ==
After seven weeks since its release, the album matched Your Favorite Weapon's sales of 51,000 copies. The album was certified Gold by the Recording Industry Association of America on May 29, 2007, nearly four years after its original release.

Brand New, who would soon sign with DreamWorks Records (which became incorporated into Interscope Records), were recognized as part of a trend that saw bands labeled as "emo" getting signed to major record label deals in an attempt to sign the next big thing. Spin dubbed this trend "mainstreamo", but Lacey rebuked the hype, believing that "I think it’s all gonna fall through in a year and a half, maybe sooner. This is becoming like ’80s hair metal all over again. All you can really do is try hard to be one of the bands that does manage to stick.” The program director for influential Washington, D.C. rock radio station WHFS noted that "we haven’t reached the point where Puddle of Mudd fans are calling up requesting Brand New.”

Following the album's success, Triple Crown Records knew that they had no chance of re-signing Brand New following the conclusion of their two-album deal. Lyor Cohen, at the time the president of The Island Def Jam Music Group, asked Thursday vocalist Geoff Rickly to speak positively about Island Records to Lacey in order to convince Brand New to sign with them. However, Lacey did not believe Rickly, as he noted how the label had told Thursday to rewrite their album War All the Time in order to placate the executives and did not want that happening to Brand New as well. Michael Goldstone, who at the time was leaving DreamWorks Records for Sire Records, told Interscope Records executive Luke Wood to sign Brand New; Wood recalled that "for about six months, every label was trying to sign the band, chasing them all over the world. It was brutal." Vagrant Records had the money to match DreamWorks' offer, but Brand New ultimately signed with DreamWorks/Interscope.

== Critical reception ==
Professional ratings
Aggregate scores
Source	Rating
Metacritic	70/100
Review scores
Source	Rating
AbsolutePunk	99%
AllMusic	4/5 stars
CMJ New Music Report	(favorable)
Drowned in Sound	8/10
Entertainment Weekly	B
IGN	9.7/10
Pitchfork	6.9/10
PopMatters	(Favorable)
Spin	4/5 stars
Sputnikmusic	5/5 stars

Deja Entendu received very positive reviews from critics, who praised the band's evolution from their debut album.

AllMusic gave Deja Entendu four out of five stars, stating that:

As of 2003, Brand New had sidestepped any notion that they'd be stuck in the prototypical mold found on Your Favorite Weapon. Unlike their debut, Deja Entendu isn't all about bitter breakups and doesn't fall into a permanent punk-pop hole. Produced by Steven Haigler (Pixies, Quicksand), this sophomore effort finds Brand New maturing, reaching for textures and song structures instead of clichés.

Rolling Stone praised the album: "Deja Entendu is an emo masterpiece if ever there was one, applying the intensity of post-hardcore and oddly sexy grooves to sophisticated and impassioned songwriting."

Pitchfork gave the album a positive review, complimenting its "air of substance and maturity" and comparing "The Boy Who Blocked His Own Shot" to The Smiths.

Kerrang! compared the album's "poetic melancholy" to The Smiths and Joy Division.

Revolver wrote that "the leap between Weapon and Entendu is astounding: It's like God grabbed Brand New by the hair and poured inspiration down their gullets."

Sputnikmusic gave the album five stars out of five, proclaiming that "We could relate to the way that Lacey screamed "This is the reason you're alone, this is the rise and the fall" at the end of 'Tommy Gun.' We understood the desperation in his voice and the subtle undertones of sexual frustration in 'Me vs. Maradona vs. Elvis.' We were just beginning to see how brilliant the lyrics were to 'Play Crack The Sky', a song that simultaneously deals with love, death, and relationships on a singular metaphorical level. These emotions were new to us, and we had a feeling that they meant something to the man singing about them too." IGN rated the album 9.7/10, calling it "probably the best underground release this year."

=== Accolades ===
The album ranked at No. 25 on Sputnikmusic's list of the Top 100 Albums of the 2000s, one of two Brand New albums on the list (The Devil and God Are Raging Inside Me was included at No. 20). Rolling Stone placed the album at No. 19 in their list of the 40 Greatest Emo Albums of All Time, ahead of Your Favorite Weapon at No. 29. The album was included in Rock Sound's 101 Modern Classics list at number 21. Rock Sound later wrote the album's "slow burn appeal and genre-defining quality" would define the album as "an emo classic." They also wrote it would become the "blueprint [that] would spawn scores of imitators, [and] make alternative icons of its creators". NME listed the album as one of "20 Emo Albums That Have Resolutely Stood The Test Of Time". In 2022, Loudwire listed it at No. 43 on its list of the 50 Greatest Pop Punk Albums.

In 2023, Billboard named "Okay I Believe You, But My Tommy Gun Don't" as the 29th-best non-single "deep cut" from 2003. The song was also named one of the 15 biggest emo songs from the genre's "mainstream era".

== Touring ==
Shortly after the album's release, Brand New went on a tour of the US in July 2003 with support from Moneen, The Beautiful Mistake and Senses Fail, although tickets went on sale before the album came out and several dates sold out. Following the album's release, Brand New was one of over 40 bands that performed at the 2003 Warped Tour, playing from July 23 to the tour's close on August 10. After the Warped Tour, the band opened for Dashboard Confessional's American dates in August. Brand New headlined another tour in late 2003, supported by Hot Rod Circuit and Eisley.

In January 2004, Brand New headlined their first tour of the United Kingdom, supported by Straylight Run and Moneen. In March 2004, Brand New supported Blink-182 on an arena tour of Australia. In May 2004, Brand New returned to the United Kingdom to support Incubus on an arena tour.

== Legacy ==
Jason Tate, the founder of AbsolutePunk, said that "When they put out Deja, it was a completely scene-altering album at the time: what people were listening to, what was being made. It felt like such a shift in style. It was so good that literally overnight, bands were ripping it off and needed to make the next version of it." NME wrote, "The lonely spaceman on its cover said it all… Jesse Lacey and co’s 2003 soul-purging was a punky, Morrisseyian essay on isolation." Rolling Stone explained the album's legacy as the moment when the band "ditched the bottled-up energy of their debut for moody, textured, cavernous numbers that augmented Lacey's acidic lyrics."

Fall Out Boy's primary lyricist Pete Wentz said of Deja Entendu after its release, "This is the future of music, Fall Out Boy is gonna aim towards this." Adam Siska, the bassist for The Academy Is..., noted the album's influence on emo in a 2023 interview: "When Deja came out, nothing was the same. Every band was starting to aim for this intelligent poetic lyricism, this sort of East Coast poetry, with long song titles." Geoff Rickly, the lead singer of Thursday, who had toured with Brand New during the Your Favorite Weapon era, did not believe that Deja Entendu was released by the same band, having written them off as "just this pop-punk band."

The pressure to exceed Deja Entendu after experiencing its impact weighed on Lacey as he recorded the band's follow-up. "I hope that Deja isn't our Loveless for anyone. That would be very upsetting for me, because that would mean that the person listening to it isn't allowing us the possibility of getting even better," he said in 2005.

== Track listing ==
All lyrics are written by Jesse Lacey; all music is composed by Jesse Lacey, except where noted.

Standard Edition
No.	Title	Writer(s)	Length
1.	"Tautou"		1:42
2.	"Sic Transit Gloria...Glory Fades"	Vincent Accardi, Jesse Lacey	3:06
3.	"I Will Play My Game Beneath the Spin Light"		3:57
4.	"Okay I Believe You, But My Tommy Gun Don't"		5:35
5.	"The Quiet Things That No One Ever Knows"	Accardi, Lacey	4:01
6.	"The Boy Who Blocked His Own Shot"		4:39
7.	"Jaws Theme Swimming"	Accardi, Lacey	4:34
8.	"Me vs. Maradona vs. Elvis"	Accardi, Lacey	5:19
9.	"Guernica"	Accardi, Lacey	3:23
10.	"Good to Know That If I Ever Need Attention All I Have to Do Is Die"		7:00
11.	"Play Crack the Sky"		5:27
Total length:			48:47

Japanese Edition Bonus Track
No.	Title	Length
12.	"The Boy Who Blocked His Own Shot" (acoustic version)	5:03

== Personnel ==
- Jesse Lacey – lead vocals, rhythm guitar
- Vincent Accardi – lead guitar, backing vocals
- Garrett Tierney – bass guitar, backing vocals
- Brian Lane – drums, percussion

== Charts ==
Chart (2003–2004)	Peak position
Australian Hitseekers Albums (ARIA)	16
Canadian Albums (Nielsen SoundScan)	75
UK Albums (OCC)	105
UK Rock & Metal Albums (Official Charts)	11
US Billboard 200	63

Chart (2007)	Peak position
UK Independent Albums (Official Charts) Deja Entendu/Your Favorite Weapon	28

Chart (2015)	Peak position
UK Independent Albums (Official Charts)	36
US Top Tastemaker Albums (Billboard)	8
US Vinyl Albums (Billboard)	3

== Certifications ==
Region	Certification	Certified units/sales
United Kingdom (BPI)	Silver	60,000^{‡}
United States (RIAA)	Gold	500,000^{^}
^{^} Shipments figures based on certification alone.^{‡} Sales+streaming figures based on certification alone.
