= Jesse Lacey =

American musician (born 1978)

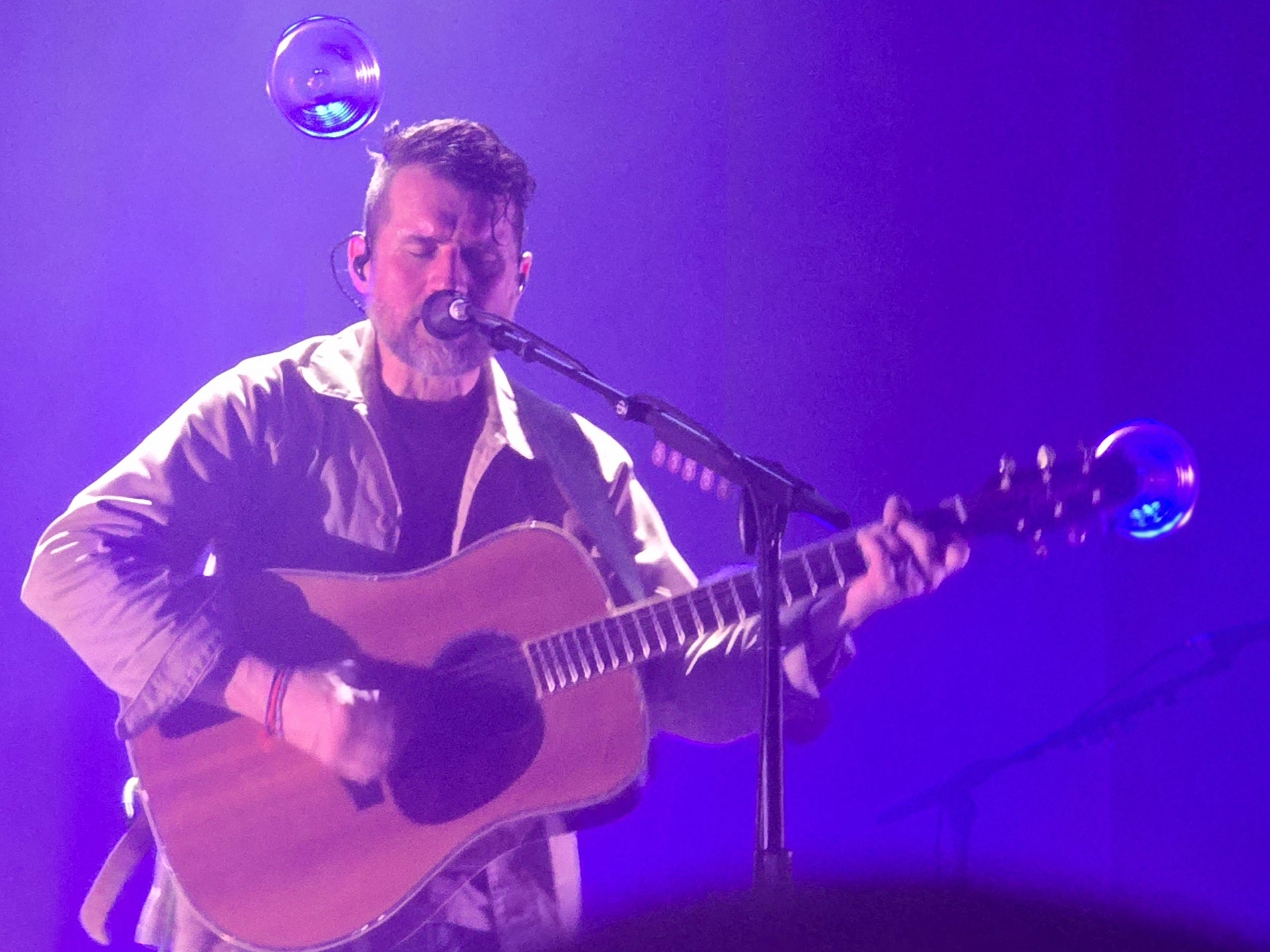
- Lacey performing in 2025

Background information
- Born: Jesse Thomas Lacey; July 10, 1978 (age 48)
- Origin: Levittown, New York, U.S.
- Genres: Alternative rock; emo; indie rock; post-hardcore; pop punk; acoustic rock
- Occupations: Musician; singer; songwriter; record producer
- Instruments: Vocals; guitar; piano; bass; trombone
- Years active: 1999–2017, 2024–present
- Labels: Procrastinate! Music Traitors; Razor & Tie; Interscope; Triple Crown
- Member of: Brand New
- Formerly of: Taking Back Sunday
- Website: fightoffyourdemons.com

Jesse Thomas Lacey (born July 10, 1978) is an American musician, singer, songwriter, and record producer who is best known as the lead vocalist and rhythm guitarist for the American alternative rock band Brand New.

Lacey was the founding bassist of fellow Long Island rock band Taking Back Sunday but left the band after a personal incident involving guitarist John Nolan. Along with members of the Rookie Lot, Lacey formed Brand New in 2000. With Brand New, Lacey earned a number-one album in the United States due to the commercial success of 2017's Science Fiction.

As well as fronting Brand New, Lacey has performed as a solo artist since 2004, although has not yet released any solo material, and instead performs material by Brand New, as well as covering other bands. Lacey has produced and co-produced a number of records, including those Brand New, as well as Kevin Devine's Bubblegum and a track by Cymbals Eat Guitars.

== Early life and education ==
Lacey was raised in a Christian family on Long Island, where he was a regular churchgoer, although Lacey has said Christianity was never forced upon him. His parents listened to bands such as the Beatles, Steely Dan, Simon and Garfunkel and Bruce Springsteen, which Lacey has stated contributed towards both his interest and taste in music, commenting that "there was always a record playing, and good music, too". Albums by Billy Joel, "Weird Al" Yankovic and The Big Picture by Michael W. Smith were amongst some of the first that Lacey owned.

Lacey attended South Shore Christian School in Levittown, New York along with John Nolan. After Nolan convinced Lacey to learn the bass guitar, the two friends would go on to form a number of bands during their high school years, one of which was named Gudmunder Bjornsen. He also learned how to play the trombone while participating in the church choir. In 1998, Lacey, along with Garrett Tierney, Brian Lane and Brandon Reilly formed the Rookie Lot, who would self-release a split EP as well as a demo tape. Lacey described his upbringing as "really white and really middle-class".

In November 1999, Lacey formed Taking Back Sunday with guitarist Eddie Reyes; after adding Nolan to the band, Lacey moved to bass guitar. He contributed bass guitar and backing vocals to their first EP in 2001, but left the band during the recording sessions after Nolan slept with Lacey's girlfriend. Prior to becoming a full-time musician, Lacey had a number of different jobs, including working for the clothing retailer Gap Inc., a skate and bike shop, and also spending two days working at McDonald's, before quitting after being told "sexual harassment is going to happen, so get used to it".

== Musical career ==
=== Brand New ===
After the Rookie Lot broke up, its former members, with the exception of Reilly (who formed the Movielife), would form Brand New, recruiting Vincent Accardi as an additional guitarist. After recording and releasing a number of demos, the band released their debut album Your Favorite Weapon in 2001. Lacey provided lead vocals and guitar for the album, as well as writing lyrics for all of the songs.

The band toured heavily up until work began on their second album in February 2003. Influenced by his time on the road, Lacey wrote much of the album on acoustic guitar in his bedroom. The album's success led the band to be engulfed in a bidding war between labels. Brand New toured for nearly 300 days to promote the album, causing Lacey to tear his patellar tendon.

After finishing the extensive touring and promotional cycle for their album Deja Entendu, Lacey had become unsure as to whether he even wanted to release another record. In an interview, Lacey stated that he had the realization that he no longer wished to be associated with many of the people and bands he'd met over the past years with Brand New, and he also felt as though he had no friends. After writing and recording sessions in late 2004, the band became inactive. In spring 2005, Lacey became sick and subsequently underwent surgery for a number of problems.

After the loss of a number of his friends and family members, Lacey and his bandmates purposely immersed themselves in their grief, channeling it into the songwriting with the hope of expelling it. Having previously become disillusioned and uninterested in the bands and people they were previously around, Lacey found friendship in bands such as Thrice, mewithoutYou, Manchester Orchestra and Kevin Devine, remarking that they had "created a small community". In later interviews, Lacey stated that the writing and recording of their third album, the critically acclaimed The Devil and God Are Raging Inside Me, saved the band. In 2008, Lacey along with his Brand New bandmates cofounded the record label Procrastinate! Music Traitors.

=== Solo ===
One of Lacey's first solo shows was on April 27, 2004, at The Downtown in Farmingdale, New York, performing a mixture of covers and songs by his band, Brand New. In July 2007, Lacey and Kevin Devine did an acoustic tour in the United States with Grace Read, with Lacey once again performing material from Brand New, as well as performing various tracks with Devine.

In 2008 Lacey toured with Kevin Devine and Brooklyn native Brian Bonz, later stating in an interview how at this point he wished only to occasionally tour and perform Brand New material solo, believing that "the songs lack meaning" without his bandmates beside him. After performing solo with Devine on December 12, 2015, Lacey was soon-after revealed to be part of Devine's Devinyl splits series, with his single, a cover of R.E.M.'s "Bad Day", seeing release early in 2016.

On January 31, 2025, Lacey performed a solo set in Los Angeles to raise money in relief of the Los Angeles wildfires. On March 2, Lacey performed his first public solo show since Brand New's breakup, where he performed new music and publicly addressed the death of his stepson for the first time in Madison, Tennessee. On December 14, 2025, Lacey played another public solo show in Nashville, with all proceeds going to the Second Harvest Food Bank.

=== Other projects ===
Outside of Brand New, Lacey has frequently collaborated with Kevin Devine, both in the studio and live. In 2005, Lacey was featured Kevin Devine's album Split the Country, Split the Street, providing vocals on the songs "Cotton Crush", "Afterparty", and "No One Else's Problem". In 2009, he would again contribute to the album Brother's Blood, singing on "Tomorrow's Just Too Late".

In 2013, Lacey produced the album Bubblegum. Lacey was initially nervous, as it was the first album he had produced outside of Brand New. Along with Kevin Devine, Lacey frequently appeared onstage and on tour with Manchester Orchestra.

Other appearances by Lacey include contributing bass guitar to the track "Rocket" on the Intramural 2007 album This Is a Landslide, as well as providing bass and guitar on Grace Read's song "Cloak and Dagger", from her EP Young Guns. At various Brand New shows in 2014 and 2015, Lacey joined support band Dinosaur Pile-Up on stage, performing their track "Nature Nurture".

Lacey and his wife Andrea released a cover of "In Spite of Ourselves", originally by John Prine in February 2015. In 2015, Lacey, along with Mike Sapone, co-produced the track "Aerobed" for the band Cymbals Eat Guitars, as part of the Devinyl Splits series, curated by Kevin Devine.

American singer Halsey, a publicized Brand New fan, referred to Lacey as "largely responsible for why I write with such detail." Lacey and the rest of the band earned songwriting credits on Halsey's 2020 album Manic as a result of her sampling the "(Fork and Knife)" demo on her song "Alanis' Interlude". Brand New was thanked in the liner notes of Manic.

In 2025, Lacey and Brand New drummer Brian Lane were named as co-writers and producers of the self-titled debut album from Stagediver, the solo project of Kelsey Kopecky.

== Influences ==
Early on in his career as a musician, Lacey cited bands such as Lifetime, Foo Fighters, the Cars and Pearl Jam as influences for himself and Brand New. He later taped the words "Hi Moz", a reference to the Smiths frontman Morrissey, to his guitar during their performance of "The Quiet Things That No One Ever Knows" on Jimmy Kimmel Live! in 2003.

During the recording of Deja Entendu, Lacey said his favorite band was Sigur Rós while also noting the influence of Mogwai and the Smiths, also praising Outkast as a rare group breaking new ground in music. Towards the release of The Devil and God Are Raging Inside Me, Lacey expressed his fandom of the Stone Roses and Ride. During the Daisy era, Lacey cited Polvo, Archers of Loaf, Fugazi and Modest Mouse as influences. He named Sonic Youth and My Bloody Valentine as the influences for the album's guitar sound.

On Deja Entendu, Lacey's lyrics were written mostly about situations that he was personally close to. "Being white and middle-class is a very shallow thing to draw from... but I really can't write about anything else. There wasn't much about anyone else on that last record."

Religious imagery and themes such as faith, the afterlife, the supernatural as well as moral issues are often explored in Lacey's songwriting. Lacey, however, has made it clear his songs are not, and never will be about Christianity, remarking that the band Brand New do not share the same beliefs, so to try to label the band with any one religion would be "absolutely ridiculous". Film, television and literature have also influenced his songwriting.

In Brand New, Lacey and his bandmates compose material separately from one another, rarely rehearsing or practicing together. Instead Lacey will often write material on an acoustic guitar, before bringing it to the rest of the band.

During the writing and recording of the 2006 album The Devil and God Are Raging Inside Me, Lacey was particularly influenced by bands such as U2 and Radiohead to try writing using instruments other than the guitar. During the sessions, Lacey and Devine's friendship would play a major influence on his songwriting, with him looking to write more about current events.

== Public image ==
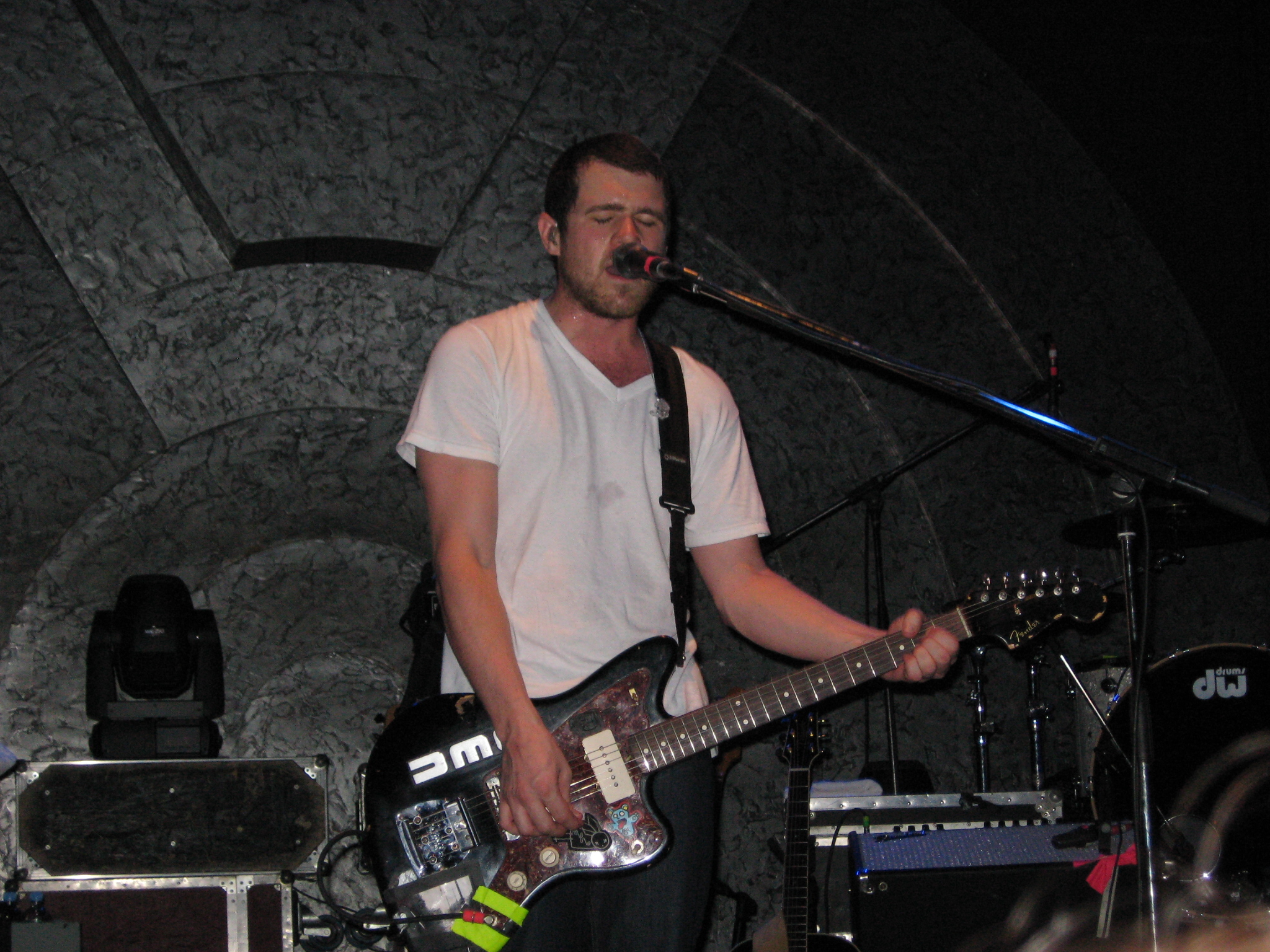
Lacey performing in 2008

Lacey has been described by the media as being both enigmatic and reserved. He has no public social media accounts and only occasionally gives interviews, stating in one interview that although he enjoys talking to people, he and his Brand New bandmates feel more comfortable not having to worry about interviews, photo shoots and music videos, and that "those peripheral things had nothing to do with the project we were working on".

His discomfort with interviews stems from American media outlets' tendency to misrepresent facts. "Most people don’t want you to look how you want to look. They want you to look how they want you to look," he said. "Writers have to make it interesting. The headline would end up being something stupid like 'We hate My Chemical Romance'."

He also dislikes the idealized image that fans create of him in their heads. He said in 2006, "On the last tour, we were on the bus watching the Mets game, and some kid wandered through an unlocked door. He saw what we were doing, and he looked so disgusted at the fact that we were sitting around watching baseball. He thought we should be cutting ourselves and crying, not drinking beer and cheering."

Following the success of Deja Entendu, Lacey was described by Kerrang! as a "heartthrob", an image which he disliked. "I don't want anyone listening to our music because they think I'm cute," he said. "We're hoping for things to go in a Radiohead way instead of a Justin Timberlake way. We want to be known for our music."

== Personal life ==
I’ve been a real difficult person to be around most of my life. I kinda feel real hypocritical being up here sometimes and pretending I know about stuff when the stuff I might know about, I don’t really apply to my life or nothing. I’ve had to learn a lot in the last couple of years. A lot of that has been about finding the person that meant a lot to me and getting married. Realizing what commitment is about and loving people and i’ve realized how difficult i’ve been to people, my wife and my band and my friends and probably my family. It’s hard being 37 and learning a lot of hard lessons that you should’ve learned when you were 17. But i’m learning them I guess.

Lacey is the second oldest of seven siblings, one of whom is a teacher. Another one of his siblings, Cody Lacey, is in the United States Navy. His brother Jamey Lacey is also a musician and was the vocalist of the band Coasta. His father is a nurse. In 2005, he revealed in an interview that he still lived in his parents' Long Island home.

Lacey is married to Andrea King. They have one child. Andrea King had a son from a previous relationship, Miles, who became Lacey's stepson. Miles King Lacey died in February 2022, which the Lacey family did not disclose until June 2023. Following his death, the Laceys created a charity named Moms Skate Club.

Prior to forming Brand New, Lacey attended Nassau Community College on Long Island for three years, studying child psychology and elementary education. Attending school with fellow musician John Nolan, the two friends had a brief, highly publicized falling out. This would lead Lacey to write "Seventy Times 7", which appeared on Brand New's 2001 album Your Favorite Weapon, while Nolan would later write about the dispute from his perspective in the Taking Back Sunday track "There's No I in Team". Later, Lacey and his Brand New bandmates stated that the "situation cleaned itself up a lot sooner than most people thought it did", and that the situation had been blown out of proportion by fans and the media. Lacey has described fellow musician Kevin Devine as one of his best friends, as well as citing him as a musical influence.

Lacey has an interest in photography and graphic design, and has had a part in designing and composing artwork for a number of releases by Brand New.

=== Sexual misconduct allegations ===
In late 2017, Lacey was accused of sexual misconduct by two women, who alleged the events occurred 15 years prior while they were underage and Lacey was in his early 20s. Lacey apologized publicly for cheating on Brand New's Facebook page and admitted to having a sex addiction in his past, which he had sought treatment for over a decade before the allegations were brought public. He did not acknowledge the alleged age of his accusers in his apology.

In 2025, another woman came forward with previously unmentioned allegations against Lacey, alleging he groomed her when she was aged 15 and "he was in his late '20s," according to Consequence. The woman claimed that Lacey had routinely invited her and her friend onto the band's tour bus and engaged in behaviors she described as "playful" and "teasing". She claimed that Lacey said to her: "I don’t hate you, the truth is I’m in love with you, but you’re just not old enough for me to marry you yet." She also stated that Lacey had implored her and her mother to not let the public become aware of their relationship, saying that Lacey told her that she had become "one of [his] best friends" and that "although we understand our relationship, others might not without more context." The new allegations came one week after the band had announced a 24-date comeback tour across the US.

== Discography ==
With Brand New

- Your Favorite Weapon (2001)
- Deja Entendu (2003)
- The Devil and God Are Raging Inside Me (2006)
- Daisy (2009)
- Science Fiction (2017)

With the Rookie Lot

- five-track demo tape (1998)
- The Rookie Lot/Yearly split 7-inch (1999)

Appearances

Year	Song(s)	Artist	Album
2005	"Cotton Crush", "Afterparty", and "No One Else's Problem"	Kevin Devine	Split the Country, Split the Streets
2007	"Rocket"	Intramural	This Is a Landslide
2009	"Tomorrow's Just Too Late"	Kevin Devine	Brother's Blood
2012	"Cloak and Dagger"	Grace Read	Young Guns

Production discography

Year	Album	Artist	Credits
2006	The Devil and God Are Raging Inside Me	Brand New	Co-produced with Mike Sapone and Brand New
2009	Daisy	Brand New	Co-produced with Mike Sapone and Brand New
2012	Bubblegum	Kevin Devine	Production, bass guitar, percussion, feedback and backing vocals on "Private First Class"
2015	Devinyl Splits No. 4	Cymbals Eat Guitars	Co-produced the track "Aerobed" with Mike Sapone
2025	stagediver	stagediver	Co-produced with Mike Sapone, backing vocals, guitar, bass
