= Manchester Orchestra discography =

Band discography

- Studio albums: 6
- EPs: 8
- Live albums: 1
- Singles: 20
- Acoustic album: 1

The discography of American rock band Manchester Orchestra consists of six studio albums, one acoustic album, one live album, eight extended plays and 20 singles.

== Albums ==
=== Studio ===
List of studio albums, with selected chart positions
Title	Album details	Peak chart positions									
Title	Album details	US	US Alt.	US Rock	AUS	BEL (FL)	GER	SCO	SWI	UK	UK Rock
I'm Like a Virgin Losing a Child	Released: October 14, 2006 (US); Label: Favorite Gentlemen, Canvasback; Formats: CD, LP, digital download	—	—	—	—	—	—	—	—	—	—
Mean Everything to Nothing	Released: April 21, 2009 (US); Label: Favorite Gentlemen, Canvasback; Formats: CD, LP, digital download	37	8	11	— (Note: Mean Everything to Nothing did not enter the Australian ARIA Albums Chart but peaked at number seven on the ARIA Hitseekers Chart.)	—	—	—	—	—	—
Simple Math	Released: May 10, 2011 (US); Label: Favorite Gentlemen, Columbia; Formats: CD, LP, digital download	21	5	8	83	—	—	—	—	107	—
Cope	Released: April 1, 2014 (US); Label: Favorite Gentlemen, Loma Vista; Formats: CD, LP, digital download	13	4	4	51	—	—	65	—	67	5
A Black Mile to the Surface	Released: July 21, 2017; Label: Favorite Gentlemen, Loma Vista; Formats: CD, LP, digital download	33	6	7	— (Note: A Black Mile to the Surface did not enter the Australian ARIA Albums Chart but peaked at number four on the ARIA Hitseekers Chart.)	—	—	59	73	93	—
The Million Masks of God	Released: April 30, 2021; Label: Favorite Gentlemen, Loma Vista; Formats: CD, LP, digital download	31	3	5	—	173	54	22	46	87	—
"—" denotes a recording that did not chart or was not released in that territory.

=== Acoustic ===
List of acoustic albums, with selected chart positions
Title	Album details	Peak chart positions		
Title	Album details	US	US Alt.	US Rock
Hope	Released: September 16, 2014 (US); Label: Favorite Gentlemen, Loma Vista; Formats: CD, LP, digital download	85	16	29

=== Live ===
List of live albums
Title	Album details
iTunes Live from SoHo	Released: February 26, 2010 (US); Label: Favorite Gentlemen, Canvasback; Formats: Digital download
Union Chapel, London, England	Released: May 29, 2026; Label: Loma Vista; Formats: Digital download; streaming

== Extended plays ==
List of extended plays
Title	EP details
5 Stories	Released: 2004 (US); Formats: CD
You Brainstorm, I Brainstorm, but Brilliance Needs a Good Editor	Released: 2005 (US); Label: Favorite Gentlemen, Canvasback; Formats: CD, digital download
Let My Pride Be What's Left Behind	Released: October 7, 2008 (US); Label: Favorite Gentlemen, Canvasback; Formats: CD, digital download
Fourteen Years of Excellence	Released: April 18, 2009 (US); Label: Favorite Gentlemen, Canvasback; Formats: CD
The MySpace Transmissions: Manchester Orchestra	Released: July 13, 2009 (US); Formats: Digital download
Live at Park Ave	Released: 2009 (US); Label: Favorite Gentlemen, Columbia; Formats: CD
I Could Be the Only One (with Kevin Devine)	Released: January 26, 2010 (US); Label: Favorite Gentlemen; Formats: Digital download
The Valley of Vision	Released: March 10, 2023; Label: Loma Vista Recordings; Formats: Digital download, vinyl, CD

== Singles ==
List of singles, with selected chart positions, showing year released and album name
Title	Year	Peak chart positions					Certifications	Album
Title	Year	US AAA	US Alt.	US Rock	CAN Rock	UK Sales	Certifications	Album
"Wolves at Night"	2007	—	—	—	—	—		I'm Like a Virgin Losing a Child
"I Can Barely Breathe"	2007	—	—	—	—	—		I'm Like a Virgin Losing a Child
"I've Got Friends"	2009	—	8	26	32	59		Mean Everything to Nothing
"Tony the Tiger"	2009	—	—	—	—	—		Mean Everything to Nothing
"Shake It Out"	2009	—	25	38	—	—		Mean Everything to Nothing
"Simple Math"	2011	—	—	—	—	—		Simple Math
"April Fool"	2011	—	40	—	—	—		Simple Math
"Virgin"	2011	—	—	—	—	—		Simple Math
"Architect" (with Frightened Rabbit)	2013	—	—	—	—	29		Non-album singles
"Make It to Me" (with Grouplove)	2013	—	—	—	—	29		Non-album singles
"Top Notch"	2014	—	—	—	—	—		Cope
"Every Stone"	2014	—	—	—	—	—		Cope
"The Gold"	2017	2	12	27	—	—		A Black Mile to the Surface
"The Moth"	2018	—	—	—	—	—		A Black Mile to the Surface
"The Gold" (with Phoebe Bridgers)	2020	—	—	—	—	—	BPI: Silver	Non-album single
"Bed Head"	2021	3	23	— (Note: "Bed Head" did not enter the Hot Rock Songs chart, but peaked at number 32 on the Rock Airplay chart.)	39	—		The Million Masks of God
"Keel Timing"	2021	—	—	—	—	—		The Million Masks of God
"Never Ending"	2021	—	—	—	—	—		Dark Nights: Death Metal Soundtrack
"Telepath"	2021	39	—	—	—	—		The Million Masks of God
"No Rule"	2022	—	—	—	—	—		Non-album single
"The Way"	2023	21	33	—	—	—		The Valley of Vision
"—" denotes a recording that did not chart or was not released in that territory.

== Music videos ==
- "Wolves at Night" (2007)
- "I Can Barely Breathe" (2008)
- "Now That You're Home" (2008)
- "Golden Ticket" (2008)
- "I've Got Friends" (2009)
- "Tony the Tiger" (2009)
- "Shake It Out" (Ver. 1) (2009)
- "Shake It Out" (Ver. 2) (2009)
- "The Only One" (2009)
- "I Can Feel a Hot One" (2009)
- "In My Teeth" (2009)
- "Pride" (2009)
- "100 Dollars" (2009)
- "Everything to Nothing" (2009)
- "My Friend Marcus" (2009)
- "The River" (2009)
- "Simple Math" (2011)
- "Virgin" (2011)
- "Top Notch" (2014)
- "The Gold" (2017)
- "The Alien" (2017)
- "The Moth" (2017)
- "The Sunshine" (2017)
- "I Know How to Speak" (2018)
- "The Silence" (2018)
- "Bed Head" (2021)
- "Keel Timing" (2021)
- "Telepath" (2021)
