= A Black Mile to the Surface =

Studio album by Manchester Orchestra
- Released: July 21, 2017
- Studios: Echo Mountain Recording; Elmwood West; Favorite Gentlemen; The Village
- Genres: Indie rock; alternative rock; Americana
- Length: 49:07
- Labels: Favorite Gentlemen; Loma Vista
- Producer: Catherine Marks

Manchester Orchestra chronology
Hope (2014)	A Black Mile to the Surface (2017)	The Million Masks of God (2021)

Singles from A Black Mile to the Surface
- 1. "The Gold" Released: June 9, 2017; 2. "The Alien" Released: June 22, 2017; 3. "The Moth" Released: July 10, 2017

A Black Mile to the Surface is the fifth studio album by American indie rock band Manchester Orchestra. It was released on July 21, 2017, through Loma Vista Recordings and Favorite Gentlemen. Recording for the album took place from the summer of 2016 onwards with producer Catherine Marks. The lead single, "The Gold", was released on June 9, 2017, alongside a music video directed by Mike Dempsey and Johnny Chew. Two more singles, "The Alien" and "The Moth", were released later in the summer.

Inspired by their work on the soundtrack for the 2016 film Swiss Army Man, band members Andy Hull and Robert McDowell set out to create an album that was a reset from the band's previous studio albums Cope and Hope (both 2014). A Black Mile to the Surface is an alternative rock and Americana record, interweaving a concept album set in a South Dakota mining town with reflections on Hull's young daughter. The album received generally positive reviews from music critics, who praised Hull's storytelling and the album's cinematic stylings. Commercially, it performed well, debuting at number 33 on the US Billboard 200.

== Background and production ==
In 2014, American indie rock band Manchester Orchestra released two companion albums, Cope and Hope. Following the release of the two albums, keyboard player Chris Freeman departed the band, leaving vocalist Andy Hull and guitarist Robert McDowell the only original members. In 2016, Hull and McDowell collaborated on the soundtrack for the film Swiss Army Man. The experience of crafting an a cappella soundtrack inspired Manchester Orchestra's approach to their next album, with McDowell saying that it "flipped the reset switch" and inspired Manchester Orchestra to "make every little second interesting".

The first three songs to be written for the album were "The Alien", "The Sunshine", and "The Grocery". Hull says, "[o]nce those were written and connected like that, we started to be like, 'Oh you know it'd be cool to do that for the whole thing and actually commit to it'". Many of the songs were reworked over periods of several months, with Hull estimating that "The Moth" took about four and a half months to reach its final form. Hull said that "The Maze" and "The Mistake" both took the longest to perfect, and that producer John Congleton came up with "one more push" that perfected those two tracks.

Manchester Orchestra recorded A Black Mile to the Surface with "a small battery of well-known indie rock producers", among them Catherine Marks, John Congleton, and Jonathan Wilson, as well as longtime collaborator Dan Hannon. The recording process began at Echo Mountain Recording in Asheville, North Carolina in the summer of 2016. Marks and Manchester Orchestra had begun collaborating over the phone several months prior, and after a week of pre-production, Marks described the two-week studio recording process as a "sonic discovery", during which she and the band experimented with ideas for how each song should sound. Manchester Orchestra traveled to London with Marks for mixing, and Los Angeles for additional production with Congleton, before finishing production at their headquarters in Alpharetta, Georgia, a suburb of Atlanta.

== Composition and themes ==
A Black Mile to the Surface has been classified as indie rock, alternative rock, and Americana, with comparisons to Fleet Foxes, Band of Horses, and Mumford & Sons. It began life as a concept album set in the mining town of Lead, South Dakota, the home of the Sanford Underground Research Facility (SURF). As the album developed, the South Dakota narrative began to interweave with Hull's complicated emotions about the birth of his daughter, and his associated feelings of life and death. The opening track, "The Maze", was written a month after the birth of Hull's daughter. While the first four tracks set "a light and dark theme", the narrative part of the record begins on "The Alien", which follows a boy from his childhood abuse into his adult life.

Sonically, Hull and the rest of the band sought to divert from the "heavy, crunchy guitars" that marked other Manchester Orchestra releases. Hull was influenced by the "minimalist aspect" of Alabama Shakes' 2015 record Sound & Color, as well as the bands Wilco and Radiohead. He challenged his bandmates to "[t]ry and do the opposite" of "whatever you're instinctively going to want to play". Marks' vision for the album involved wanting every song to sound like a different room, "Like you could understand where you were in the room and identify where each particular sound was coming from." This process involved physically recording in different rooms of the studios to utilize their different reverberations. The penultimate track, "The Parts", for instance, was recorded in a studio's bathtub, due in part to a hangover from which Hull was suffering.

Hull has said that the central theme of A Black Mile to the Surface is "family, and the circle of life, the significance and insignificance of yourself". The repeated motif of There's nothing I've got when I die that I keep, Hull explained, means: "When this life ends, all you can do is hopefully affect and influence what happens after you." The title of the album derives from a line in "The Gold", selected by a friend of the band as he read through the lyrics.

== Release and promotion ==
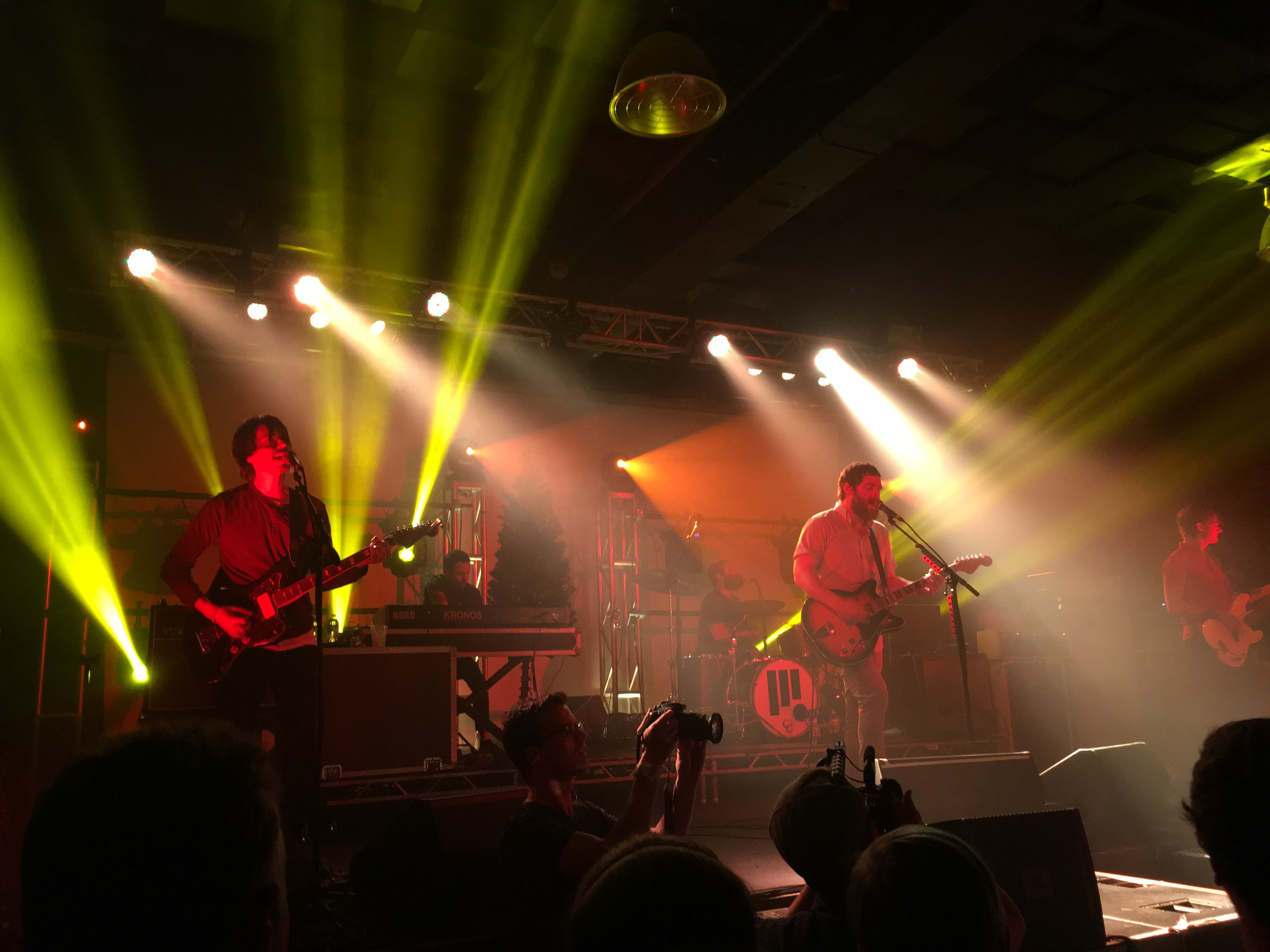
Manchester Orchestra performing in support of A Black Mile to the Surface in 2017.

Manchester Orchestra announced the name, track list, and cover art for A Black Mile to the Surface on June 9, 2017. The announcement was accompanied by the album's lead single, "The Gold", and a music video for the song, directed by Mike Dempsey and Johnny Chew. The second single, "The Alien", was released 13 days later on NPR, with a video directed by Dempsey and the Daniels. The final pre-album single, "The Moth", was released on July 10, 2017. A Black Mile to the Surface was released on July 21, 2017, through Loma Vista Recordings and the band's own independent label Favorite Gentlemen.

On June 12, 2017, only a few days after the album's announcement, Manchester Orchestra announced a fall 2017 headlining tour. In July, they added support from Tigers Jaw and Foxing to the bill. This was followed by a coheadlining tour with the Front Bottoms in November and December 2018, and a winter 2019 tour with Oso Oso and Foxing to celebrate Manchester Orchestra's 10th anniversary of Mean Everything to Nothing. On February 12, 2021, the band performed A Black Mile To The Surface: The Global Concert Film, a YouTube livestream of the album in its entirety recorded from Echo Mountain Recording studios. Hull described the concert film as "the perfect way to close the Black Mile chapter".

== Reception ==
=== Critical reception ===
Professional ratings
Aggregate scores
Source	Rating
AnyDecentMusic?	7.6/10
Metacritic	79/100
Review scores
Source	Rating
AllMusic	4.5/5 stars
Alternative Press	4.5/5 stars
The A.V. Club	C
Exclaim!	9/10
The Guardian	3/5 stars
The Irish Times	4/5 stars
Kerrang!	5/5
Pitchfork	7.0/10
PopMatters	8/10
Q	3/5 stars

A Black Mile to the Surface was met with generally positive reviews from music critics. Review aggregator Metacritic, which assigns a normalized rating out of 100 to reviews from mainstream publications, gave the album an average score of 79, while aggregator AnyDecentMusic? similarly bestowed an average of 7.6 out of 10.

In a positive review for Alternative Press, Brian Shultz wrote that Manchester Orchestra "forge a newly lush, cinematic sound, unraveling detailed tales of characters with abstractly personal references", and highlighted the album's musicality: "Layers upon layers, from acoustic guitars to programmed beats, create a gorgeous and restrained, immersive landscape, culminating in beautifully serene moments like 'The Alien' and 'The Sunshine'." Adam Feibel of Exclaim! praised the album's "sonic story arc — a story about love, marriage, fatherhood and life's constant way onward — complete with an introduction, rising action, climax and falling action that finally wind down to a conclusive, satisfying end". PopMatters writer Chris Ingalls remarked that the album's sound "doesn't derive from the airtight punk influences of decades past; rather, there's an anthemic, widescreen feel to nearly every song [...] inviting comparisons to altruistic, mid-period U2, or even Coldplay".

Other critics were less enthusiastic. Randall Colburn of The A.V. Club found that despite the band's stated intent to "strip back" their sound, "they seem to have gone in the opposite direction—with all the layering, samples, and shout-alongs, A Black Mile to the Surface is bombastic to the point of exhaustion". Carl Purvis was also critical of the album in his review for No Ripcord, writing that, "For a band where constructing songs into rocket-fueled crescendos is their biggest strength, too often does A Black Mile to the Surface fail to take advantage of any momentum it builds, often taking the wrong fork on an ascent to a splendid finale." Ian Cohen of Pitchfork, meanwhile, was critical of the album's storytelling elements, saying that the "more overtly personal material sits awkwardly among the familial drama that served as the original concept".

=== Commercial performance ===
A Black Mile to the Surface debuted at number 33 on the US Billboard 200 chart. The album also appeared on the US Top Alternative Albums and Top Rock Albums charts, peaking at numbers six and seven, respectively. In the United Kingdom, A Black Mile to the Surface peaked at number 93 on the UK Official Albums Chart and number 59 on the Scottish Albums Chart. Elsewhere, the album appeared on the Swiss Hitparade Albums Top 100 chart at number 73.

== Track listing ==
All tracks are written by Andy Hull.

A Black Mile to the Surface standard track listing
No.	Title	Length
1.	"The Maze"	2:58
2.	"The Gold"	4:33
3.	"The Moth"	4:35
4.	"Lead, SD"	4:53
5.	"The Alien"	5:28
6.	"The Sunshine"	1:57
7.	"The Grocery"	5:12
8.	"The Wolf"	4:26
9.	"The Mistake"	3:54
10.	"The Parts"	4:12
11.	"The Silence"	6:59
Total length:		49:07

== Personnel ==
Manchester Orchestra

- Andy Hull – lead vocals, guitar, producer
- Robert McDowell – guitar, keyboards, backing vocals, engineer, producer
- Andy Prince – bass guitar
- Tim Very – drums

Additional musicians

- Nate Ruess – additional vocals
- Christian Zucconi – additional vocals

Technical

- Paul Blakemore – mastering
- John Congleton – additional production
- The Daniels – package design, photography
- Mike Dempsey – package design, photography
- Jim Georgeson – assistant engineer
- Dan Hannon – additional production
- Brian Manley – layout, package design
- Catherine Marks – engineer, producer, mixing
- Clay Miller – assistant engineer
- India Watne – artists and repertoire
- Ryan Whalley – artists and repertoire
- Jonathan Wilson – additional production

Credits taken from A Black Mile to the Surface liner notes.

== Charts ==
Weekly chart performance for A Black Mile to the Surface
Chart (2017)	Peak position
Scottish Albums (Official Charts)	59
Swiss Albums (Schweizer Hitparade)	73
UK Albums (Official Charts)	93
US Billboard 200	33
US Top Alternative Albums (Billboard)	6
US Top Rock Albums (Billboard)	7
