= The Million Masks of God =

Studio album by Manchester Orchestra
- Released: April 30, 2021
- Studios: Echo Mountain (Asheville, North Carolina); Favorite Gentlemen (Atlanta, Georgia); Sound City (Los Angeles); Concord Studios (New York City)
- Genres: Indie rock; progressive rock
- Length: 45:54
- Label: Loma Vista
- Producers: Andy Hull; Robert McDowell; Catherine Marks; Ethan Gruska

Manchester Orchestra chronology
A Black Mile to the Surface (2017)	The Million Masks of God (2021)	The Valley of Vision (2023)

Singles from The Million Masks of God
- 1. "Bed Head" Released: February 18, 2021; 2. "Keel Timing" Released: March 26, 2021; 3. "Telepath" Released: April 27, 2021

The Million Masks of God is the sixth studio album by American indie rock band Manchester Orchestra. It was released through Loma Vista on April 30, 2021. The album was announced on February 18, 2021, alongside the release of the first single "Bed Head". This was the final studio album with drummer Tim Very before his death in February 2026.

== Background ==
Manchester Orchestra released their fifth studio album, A Black Mile to the Surface, on July 21, 2017, via Loma Vista Recordings and Favorite Gentlemen. That fall, the band embarked on a North American headlining tour, with support from Foxing and Tigers Jaw. In 2018, Manchester Orchestra and The Front Bottoms coheadlined a winter tour, bookended by Manchester Orchestra's annual Thanksgiving show, "The Stuffing", and the Front Bottoms' Christmas performance, "Champagne Jam". The following year, Manchester Orchestra went on tour again, this time to celebrate the 10th anniversary of their 2009 album Mean Everything to Nothing. The band played the album in its entirety, with support from Foxing and Oso Oso.

The impacts of the COVID-19 pandemic forced most concert performances to cease in 2020. Manchester Orchestra frontman Andy Hull spent the better part of the year releasing demo albums from his side project, Right Away, Great Captain!, as well as collaborating with Foxing and Touché Amoré. In October, Manchester Orchestra performed two socially-distant concerts at South Farms in Morris, Connecticut. On February 12, 2021, Manchester Orchestra performed A Black Mile To The Surface: The Global Concert Film, a black-and-white YouTube livestream performance of Black Mile in its entirety. The performance itself, as well as a Facebook encore screening and a pre-show virtual meet and greet, were made free to the public. Hull said that the concert film "feels like the perfect way to close the Black Mile chapter, and I'm excited to say that this is more than just a concert. It's also the beginning."

== Writing and recording ==
Writing for The Million Masks of God began in late 2017, but Hull told Aesthetic Magazine that Manchester Orchestra "really began putting it together in the beginning of 2019".

Recording largely took place between Echo Mountain Recording in North Carolina and Gruska's studio in Los Angeles. The band recorded at Sound City Studios for three days before returning to Gruska's home in Los Angeles, where Hull, McDowell, Gruska, and Marks stayed for two weeks. The acoustic guitars used on The Million Masks of God were made by C. F. Martin & Company. Initially, Hull recorded electric guitars on a Fender Jazzmaster while McDowell used a Fender Coronado, but the guitarists switched instruments shortly into production. McDowell said that he and Hull "got them and immediately got jealous of the other one". By the time of that the COVID-19 pandemic shut down most work in the US in March 2020, Manchester Orchestra had finished recording the album, and was about to begin mixing with Marks. Marks would spend six hours a day mixing for three months.

== Composition and themes ==
The Million Masks of God has been described as indie rock and progressive rock, with comparisons to Mumford & Sons, Band of Horses, Tool, Simon & Garfunkel, Silversun Pickups, My Morning Jacket, and Muse.

The album title derives from "Gold Leaves", an early poem by G. K. Chesterton that details the narrator's shifting relationship with God as he ages.

== Release and promotion ==
Manchester Orchestra announced the details of their then-upcoming album, including the title, track listing, and release date, on February 18, 2021. As part of the album announcement, the first single and music video from The Million Masks of God, "Bed Head", were released the same day. In an interview with SiriusXM's Alt Nation, Hull described the song as about "two old friends existing in two separate realities", having a "conversation about the lives they lived, the consequences of life's decisions, and finding purpose in trying to be better".

The second single and music video, "Keel Timing", were released on March 26, 2021. Although it was released later, Hull said that "Keel Timing" "serves as a prequel" to "Bed Head", and is "an isolated internal investigation about personal growth". The final single to be released before The Million Masks of God, "Telepath", debuted on April 27, 2021. The track was accompanied by a single-shot video, directed by Isaac Deitz, and describes "the ebb and flow of life long commitment to another person". The Million Masks of God was released on April 30, 2021, through Loma Vista Recordings.

== Reception ==
=== Critical reception ===
Professional ratings
Aggregate scores
Source	Rating
AnyDecentMusic?	7.6/10
Metacritic	81/100
Review scores
Source	Rating
AllMusic	4/5 stars
Consequence	B+
DIY	4/5 stars
Exclaim!	7/10
The Line of Best Fit	9/10
NME	4/5 stars
Paste	7.5/10
Slant Magazine	2.5/5 stars
Spectrum Culture	3.5/5 stars

The Million Masks of God was met with critical acclaim from music critics upon release. At Metacritic, which assigns a normalized rating out of 100 to reviews from mainstream critics, The Million Masks of God received "universal acclaim" with an average score of 81 based on 12 reviews.

Multiple reviewers compared The Million Masks of God to Manchester Orchestra's previous release, A Black Mile to the Surface. Adam Feibel of Exclaim! said that Million Masks demonstrated how Black Mile was "not an ambitious, outlying experiment, but the new template for Manchester Orchestra records going forward". Writing for The Line of Best Fit, Dave Beech agreed that Million Masks felt "much the same" as Black Mile, both in sound and storytelling, and that it "successfully expand[s] further still on the huge ambition and the cinematic scope introduced by its predecessor". In a more negative review, Jordan Walsh of Slant Magazine referred to the album as "less of a natural evolution and more like a retread" of Manchester Orchestra's previous album. Grant Sharples of Paste countered that "it makes sense that this new record derives so much of its sound from its predecessor. This is what Manchester Orchestra sounds like now."

Certain reviewers compared Black Mile and Million Masks to Manchester Orchestra's early work. Jordan Blum of Consequence contrasted the later "gracefully melodic, emotional, and dense" albums with Manchester Orchestra's "relatively rowdy and simplistically produced" debut album, 2006's I'm Like a Virgin Losing a Child. Colin Dempsey of Spectrum Culture, meanwhile, declared that Hull was "finally mature enough to appreciate the power of restraint", following the "youthful overspilling" of Mean Everything to Nothing and the "grandiosity" of Simple Math (2011).

Reviewers also drew attention to Hull and McDowell's desire to create a "movie album" with The Million Masks of God. Matt Collar of AllMusic described the album as an "epic dramatic arc", and "a cinematic experience exploring themes of birth, death, and what lies beyond". Sarah Jamieson of DIY echoed the "cinematic" label, praising the "dynamic and vital" sound of The Million Masks of God. Writing for NME, Will Richards highlighted the sonic cohesion of the album, saying that the record "traverses every corner of [Manchester Orchestra]'s sound, from beefy rock songs to string-assisted grandeur and acoustic bliss, further cementing their place as an under appreciated band to treasure".

=== Commercial performance ===
The Million Masks of God had a moderate commercial showing in North America and Europe. In the US, the album debuted at number 31 on the Billboard 200. It also appeared on the US Top Rock Albums, Top Alternative Albums, and Independent Albums charts, coming in at numbers five, three, and four, respectively. In the United Kingdom, The Million Masks of God reached number 87 on the Official Albums Chart, and number 22 on the Scottish Albums Charts. Elsewhere in Europe, the album appeared on the Belgian Ultratop charts at number 173, the German Offizielle Top 100 at number 54, and the Swiss Hitparade at number 46.

== Track listing ==
All tracks are written by Manchester Orchestra.

The Million Masks of God track listing
No.	Title	Length
1.	"Inaudible"	4:21
2.	"Angel of Death"	5:47
3.	"Keel Timing"	4:18
4.	"Bed Head"	4:04
5.	"Annie"	4:28
6.	"Telepath"	2:28
7.	"Let It Storm"	4:18
8.	"Dinosaur"	3:27
9.	"Obstacle"	3:43
10.	"Way Back"	3:39
11.	"The Internet"	5:21
Total length:		45:54

== Personnel ==
Manchester Orchestra

- Andy Hull – vocals, guitar, keyboards, percussion, production, engineering
- Robert McDowell – guitar, keyboards, programming, production
- Tim Very – drums, percussion
- Andy Prince – bass guitar

Additional musicians

- Ethan Gruska – keyboards, guitar, percussion, programming, production
- Caroline Swon – additional vocals on "Telepath"

Technical

- Catherine Marks – production, engineering, mixing
- Dowell Gandy – assistant engineer
- Jamie Martens – assistant engineer
- Paul Blakemore – mastering

== Charts ==
Chart performance for The Million Masks of God
Chart (2021)	Peak position
Belgian Albums (Ultratop Flanders)	173
German Albums (Offizielle Top 100)	54
Scottish Albums (Official Charts)	22
Swiss Albums (Schweizer Hitparade)	46
UK Albums (Official Charts)	87
US Billboard 200	31
US Independent Albums (Billboard)	4
US Top Alternative Albums (Billboard)	3
US Top Rock Albums (Billboard)	5
