= Simple Math =

Studio album by Manchester Orchestra
- Released: 9 May 2011
- Recorded: August–December 2010
- Studios: Blackbird (Nashville, Tennessee); Favorite Gentlemen (Atlanta, Georgia); Eldest Only (Atlanta, Georgia)
- Genres: Indie rock; post-hardcore; symphonic rock
- Length: 45:05
- Label: Favorite Gentlemen
- Producers: Dan Hannon; Manchester Orchestra

Manchester Orchestra chronology
| Mean Everything to Nothing (2009) | Simple Math (2011) | Cope (2014) |

Singles from Simple Math
- 1. "Simple Math" Released: February 28, 2011

Simple Math is the third studio album from Atlanta-based indie rock band Manchester Orchestra. It was released on May 10, 2011, through the independent label Favorite Gentlemen Recordings, itself distributed by Sony Music Entertainment. The album was recorded with Dan Hannon, who also produced the band's first album and co-produced their second.

Andy Hull, the band's lyricist and vocalist, has said that Simple Math is a concept album, telling a story from his own perspective: "It's a story about a 23-year-old who questions everything from marriage to love to religion to sex. Sometimes even for myself, it’s difficult to decipher which one I’m actually talking to. Everything I’ve written in the past has been about those things. This album is the most realized form of my questioning." A week prior to its official release, the entire album was available for streaming on their official website.

Led by the title track and single "Simple Math," the album was a success for the band, obtaining praise from music critics and debuting at a career-high number twenty-one on the Billboard 200 and number eight on the Billboard Rock Albums chart with opening week sales of 18,000 units.

== Reception ==
=== Commercial performance ===
Simple Math was a moderate commercial success for the band. Opening week sales reached 18,000 units according to Nielsen SoundScan which debuted the album at number eight on the Billboard Rock Albums chart and number twenty one on the main Billboard 200. The album also entered the Billboard Alternative Albums chart at number five as well as the Billboard Tastemaker Albums chart at number nine. The Tastemaker chart is not decided by record sales, but compiled by ranking new albums based on "an influential panel of indie stores and small regional chains." Overall, this marked an improvement compared to its predecessor Mean Everything to Nothing (2009), which reached number thirty seven on the main Billboard chart and number eleven on the Rock Albums chart. In Canada, the album reached a peak of number fourteen on the Alternative Albums chart and also number seventy eight on the main Top 100 Albums Chart.

=== Critical response ===
Professional ratings
Aggregate scores
| Source | Rating |
|---|---|
| AnyDecentMusic? | 6.2/10 |
| Metacritic | 73/100 |
Review scores
| Source | Rating |
| AbsolutePunk | 95% |
| AllMusic | 3.5/5 stars |
| American Songwriter | 4/5 stars |
| Blare | 4/5 stars |
| Drowned in Sound | 7/10 |
| Paste Magazine | 6.4/10 |
| Rock Sound | 9/10 |
| Rolling Stone | 3/5 stars |
| Spin | 7/10 |
| Sputnikmusic | 3.5/5 |

Simple Math received positive reviews from music critics upon release. At Metacritic, which assigns a normalized rating out of 100 to reviews from mainstream critics, the album received a weighted average of 73, based on sixteen reviews, which indicates "generally favorable reviews". Adam Pfleider of AbsolutePunk called the album a "shocking absorption" and awarded a near-perfect rating of 95%. He noted that, "in a year that's produced an overwhelming amount of great music, Simple Math is another outstanding painting worth the public's attention. When Hull sings "Believe me, all is brilliant," it really is once again for this band." BBC Music journalist Mike Diver also gave a favorable review. Despite stating that, "its 10 songs aren’t all of the level needed to propel its makers into the biggest indie-rock leagues", he was of the opinion that Simple Math, "contains some of their finest songs yet. There are moments of real beauty, though the prettiest arrangements come complete with necessarily ugly imagery." Drowned in Sound critic Robert Cooked wrote, "What’s great about Manchester Orchestra is that they don’t quite fit into a box. Sadly, this makes them another one of those bands that don’t sell as many records as they deserve to." Awarding a score of seven out of ten, he added that the album is an "intelligent slab of thrilling, stadium-sized rock that does away with the genre’s dumb clichés. It’s hard not to get a kick out of hearing such an independent spirit raging through this album, even if commercially, Simple Math doesn’t quite add up."

Ben Patashnik of Rock Sound magazine gave the album nine out of ten in his review. He claimed that, "they're always a breath away from total fucking chaos or lullaby-soft crooning. And throughout, the highs are tinged with a sadness and the lows with hope, making Simple Math a complex and rewarding album that soars above the pack." In a review for Spin, David Menconi said that Andy Hull had "been making shockingly precocious records for years. But his band's third full-length is an old-fashioned magnum opus of a concept album, detailing a nervous breakdown with epic glam-rock gestures. Hull's greatest skill is making his emotions sound as extravagant as they feel, especially when he screams." Adam Knott, a contributing writer for Sputnikmusic awarded the album a "superb" 4.5/5. He opined that "although situated largely in the seemingly mundane where its predecessor concerned itself (perhaps excessively) with abstract universalities, Simple Math might actually be the superior record. Its centrepiece, as with Mean Everything To Nothing's "I Can Feel A Hot One", is the most explicit illustration of the band's overflowing emotion, but the same level and intensity of fire can be found even on its most flippant tracks."

== Track listing ==
All tracks are written by Andy Hull

| No. | Title | Length |
|---|---|---|
| 1. | "Deer" | 3:18 |
| 2. | "Mighty" | 3:39 |
| 3. | "Pensacola" | 3:36 |
| 4. | "April Fool" | 4:21 |
| 5. | "Pale Black Eye" | 4:17 |
| 6. | "Virgin" | 4:28 |
| 7. | "Simple Math" | 5:05 |
| 8. | "Leave It Alone" | 4:06 |
| 9. | "Apprehension" | 4:34 |
| 10. | "Leaky Breaks" | 7:14 |

== Personnel ==
The following personnel contributed to Simple Math:

Manchester Orchestra

- Andy Hull — lead vocals, rhythm guitar, keyboard, lyrics
- Robert McDowell — lead guitar, backing vocals
- Jonathan Corley — bass, backing vocals
- Christopher Freeman — percussion, organ, piano, synthesizer, backing vocals

String ensemble

- Eddie Horst — conductor
- Ben Talmi — string arrangements
- Greg Martin — additional string arranging
- Justin Burns — violin
- Joy A. Christy — violin
- Kenn Wagner — violin
- Sheela Iyengar — violin
- Olga Shpitko — violin
- Sou-Chun Su — violin
- Wesley P. Collins — viola
- Tania Maxwell — viola
- Joli Wu — viola
- Karen Freer — cello
- Charae Krueger — cello
- Daniel Laufer — cello

Session musicians

- Len Clark — drums
- Benjamin Homola — drums
- Timothy Very — drums
- Daniel Dewitt — trombone
- Brad Fisher — trumpet

School choir

- Lyndsey Laborde — choir vocals
- Eli Hannon — choir vocals
- Jake Hannon — choir vocals
- Emily Ammons — choir vocals
- Grace Ammons — choir vocals

Production

- Dan Hannon, Manchester Orchestra — producers
- Joe Chiccarelli — mixing
- Vlado Meller — mastering
- Lowell Reynolds — engineering
- Brad Fisher — engineering
- Billy Hume — additional engineering
- Graham Hope — mixing assistant
- Brian Manley — design, layout
- Carson Donnelly, Jay Harren — A&R

== Chart history ==
=== Chart positions ===
| Chart (2011) | Peak position |
|---|---|
| Canada Albums Chart (Billboard) | 78 |
| U.S Billboard 200 | 21 |
| U.S Rock Albums (Billboard) | 8 |
| U.S Alternative Albums (Billboard) | 5 |
| U.S Tastemaker Albums (Billboard) | 9 |

== Release history ==
| Region | Date | Label | Format | Catalogue # | Ref. |
|---|---|---|---|---|---|
| United Kingdom | May 9, 2011 | Columbia, Favorite Gentlemen | CD, digital download | 88697743412 | |
| United States | May 10, 2011 | Columbia, Favorite Gentlemen | CD, digital download | 774341 | |

== Music video ==
=== Synopsis ===
The music video, Simple Math, utilizes the title track and was filmed 22 – 26 February 2011 in Guntersville, Alabama and 27 February in Albertville, Alabama, with cast members from nearby Huntsville, Alabama joining the band members onscreen.

The story begins with the band's frontman, Andy Hull, swerving to avoid a collision between his truck and a hapless deer (a link to another of the album's songs) crossing an otherwise-empty country road. His knee-jerk altruism, unfortunately, leads to an infinite rollover...which in turn results in the flashing of his preadolescence before his eyes, highlight reel style. In this flashback-dream state, he hearkens back to the attentive father with whom he never truly connected and the unrequited feelings for a girl in whom he was interested—and considers that part of the difficulty and lost opportunities in his relationships may have been his own doing.

=== Background ===
Produced by Gaetano Crupi Jr. of Machina Pictures, the project fell under the auspices of the "interchangeable" California-based directing team known as the DANIELS—Daniel Kwan and Daniel Scheinert. The duo was previously best known for music videos for the bands FM Belfast (“Underwear”) and The Hundred in the Hands (“Commotion” and “Pigeons”), as well as the viral video, “Dogboarding.” See Production Team and Cast information below.

In a recent online interview, Hull describes the video's conception and M.O. In it, he expresses his preliminary meeting with The DANIELS (one of whom he discovered to be a fan), as well as his initial amused confusion at the video's thematic thrust.

“...It was kind of incredible filming it, having no idea what these dudes were doing...just having full trust in them…At the beginning, I feel like you get this vibe that the dad’s kind of an a------, and by the end you realize I’m the a------. My dad’s been there the whole time. I was just too young to see it...”

=== Production team and cast ===
Cast

- Boy — Caleb Wimberly
- Father — James (Jim) E. Zieliński
- Girl — Lexi Williams

...and Manchester Orchestra...

Crew

- Directors — Daniel Kwan and Daniel Scheinert (DANIELS)
- Producer — Gaetano Crupi Jr.
- Production Company — PrettyBird
- Executive Producer — Candice Ouaknine
- Rep — Danielle Hinde
- Director of Photography — Jackson Hunt
- Art Director — Sophie Kosofsky
- Assistant Director — Justin Gaar
- FX Supervisor — Jimmie Bradford
- Commissioner — Bryan Younce
- Casting — Hollywood Huntsville
- Production Coordinator — Charles White
- Label — Columbia Records

=== Video premiere and reception ===
The music video was released and premiered on IFC.com on Tuesday, 12 April 2011. The cinematic prestidigitation of the Kwan-Scheinert team, as well as the haunting, wistful music of the band, received praise:

“...Brilliant, awesome, stupendous, tour de force...they are all massively overused phrases...But then, very occasionally, something comes along which fully justifies these descriptions, and a few more. The video for Manchester Orchestra’s ‘Simple Math” by [The] Daniels is one of those occasions...”

“...The clip is dramatic—plus it looks like it cost a mint to create, which it very well might have since the band is on Columbia Records — but it's money well spent...”

“This video has received praise for its technically incredible, emotionally powerful storytelling. The Manchester Orchestra's muscular post-emo indie rock provides just the right amount of emotional punch to accompany the stunning imagery".

"...DANIELS haven't just made a brilliant music video, they've made an impressive short film, and when paired with Manchester Orchestra's raw, cacophonous punch, it makes for an intriguing, intelligent, incredible accompaniment."

=== MTV Video Music Awards (VMA's) ===
On 20 July 2011, it was announced that the music video was a Finalist for two MTV Video Music Awards (VMA’s), taking its place under the categories of “Best Special Effects” and “Best Editing.” At the ceremony in Los Angeles, the video lost out to “E.T.” (Katy Perry/Kanye West) and “Rolling in the Deep” (Adele), respectively.

=== UK Music Video Awards (MVA's) ===
On 18 October 2011, “Simple Math” also made the “Shortlist” as a finalist for the 4th Annual UK Music Video Awards (MVA's) “Best Indie/Rock Video – International.”

On Tuesday, 8 November 2011, it was announced at the gala ceremony (held in Westminster at The Empire, Leister Square) that the video had won both the Indie/Rock award and “Video of the Year”. Daniel and Daniel accepted.

=== Ciclope—International Advertising Craft Festival ===
Listed as the “only international festival focused on the advertising film production industry,” Ciclope takes place each year in Buenos Aires, Argentina. The 2011 festival ran from 14 – 16 November; winners were announced on 18 November.

In the “Video Clip” category, the “Simple Math” video took two honors: a Grand Prix and a Gold Award for PrettyBird, the production company.

=== 19th Annual Plus Camerimage ===
On 6 December 2011, it was announced the video had racked up yet another award, taking “Best Music Video” (“Najlepszy Wideoklip”) at the 19th Annual Plus Camerimage, the “International Film Festival of the Art of Cinematography” held each year in Bydgoszcz, Poland.

=== D&AD Awards ===
When the D&AD winners for 2012 were announced at the IMAX in Waterloo, London on 19 April, “Simple Math” had received yet another award, the Yellow Pencil for “Special Effects in a Music Video.”

The D&AD, formerly the British Design and Art Direction, Awards were created “to celebrate creative communication and raise standards within their industry.” The organization represents the global creative, design, and advertising communities and celebrates brilliance in commercial creativity.

=== Vimeo Music Festival ===
On 8 June 2012, “Simple Math” took home another honor for The Daniels, winning the “Music Video” category at the awards ceremony held in New York City.

Said one release, “…This year, the Awards received 14,567 entries from 147 countries around the world. Vimeo will make grants of $5,000 to each of the 13 category winners...”.
