= Andy Hull =

American musician

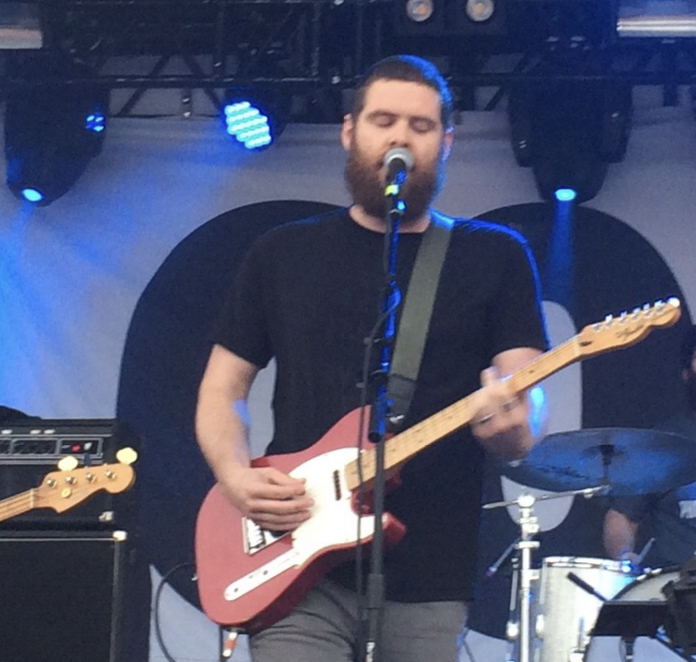
- Andy Hull performing in Asbury Park, New Jersey in May 2015

Background information
- Born: John Andrew Hull; November 7, 1986 (age 39); Atlanta, Georgia, U.S.
- Genres: Indie rock, folk rock, alternative rock, progressive rock, acoustic
- Occupations: Musician, singer-songwriter
- Instruments: Guitar, keyboards, vocals
- Years active: 2005–present
- Label: Favorite Gentlemen Recordings
- Website: Official site Tumblr; Twitter

John Andrew Hull (born November 7, 1986) is an American singer, musician and songwriter. He serves as the lead vocalist, rhythm guitarist, and primary songwriter of the indie rock band Manchester Orchestra. He also has a side project, Right Away, Great Captain!, and co-founded another project with his friend and folk musician Kevin Devine by the name of Bad Books. Hull is also co-president of Manchester Orchestra's label, Favorite Gentlemen.

== Early life ==
Hull was born in Atlanta, Georgia. Hull lived in Richmond Hill, Ontario with his family for seven years before returning to Atlanta when he was 14 years old. His parents bought him a guitar which he taught himself to play. A year later, he began writing and performing songs with a friend who played bass guitar. After that group disbanded, he started another with Manchester Orchestra's keyboard player, Chris Freeman, on drums.

== Career ==
Hull initially intended Manchester Orchestra to be a solo project, with guest appearances by his friends. "I was listening to a lot of Morrissey and The Smiths," said Hull, "So the city of Manchester really fascinated me, as did the idea of being the leader of an orchestra and having all my friends come in to play."

Feeling increasingly alienated at his "small-town-Georgia, Christian high school", Providence Christian Academy, in suburban Atlanta, Hull spent his senior high school year studying at home. He wrote and recorded his first full-length album in 2004 during the same school year.

Hull and Manchester Orchestra guitarist Robert McDowell wrote music for the 2016 film Swiss Army Man. Hull also had a cameo in the film.

== Discography ==
With Manchester Orchestra

- 5 Stories (2004)
- You Brainstorm, I Brainstorm, but Brilliance Needs a Good Editor (2005)
- I'm Like a Virgin Losing a Child (2006)
- Let My Pride Be What's Left Behind (2008)
- Fourteen Years of Excellence (2009)
- Mean Everything to Nothing (2009)
- Live at Park Ave (2009)
- I Could Be the Only One (2010)
- Simple Math (2011)
- COPE (2014)
- HOPE (2014)
- A Black Mile to the Surface (2017)
- The Million Masks of God (2021)
- The Valley of Vision (2023)

With Bad Books

- Bad Books (2010)
- II (2012)
- III (2019)

With Right Away, Great Captain!

- The Bitter End (2007)
- The Eventually Home (2008)
- The Church of the Good Thief (2012)
- The Lost Sea (2012)

With The Tiger Society

- The Tiger Society

With East on Autry

- Superhits USA (2004)

Guest appearances

- Winston Audio
  - Keeping It Down
- O'Brother
  - Sputnik
  - Machines Part I
  - Easy Talk (Open Your Mouth)
- The Dear Hunter
  - I Couldn't Do It Alone – Red
  - A Curse of Cynicism – Red
  - Deny It All – Red
- Weatherbox
  - The Devil And Whom
- Frightened Rabbit
  - Architect
- Grouplove
  - Make It To Me
- Bones
  - TellMeSomethingIDontKnow
- Touché Amoré
  - Limelight
- Paris Jackson
  - Eyelids
- Tigers Jaw
  - I Won't Care How You Remember Me
- Every Time I Die
  - Thing with Feathers
- Thrice
  - Stare at the Sun
- Say Anything
  - SixSixSix
- Rise Against
  - Black Crown

Soundtracks

- Swiss Army Man (2016)
