= The Church of the Good Thief =

Studio album by Right Away, Great Captain
- Released: June 12, 2012
- Genre: Folk rock
- Label: Favorite Gentlemen Recordings

Right Away, Great Captain chronology
The Eventually Home (2008)	The Church of the Good Thief (2012)	The Lost Sea (2012)

Professional ratings
Review scores
Source	Rating
AbsolutePunk	7/10
Alter the Press	5/5
Alternative Press	4/5 stars

The Church of the Good Thief is the third and final release from Andy Hull's solo project, Right Away, Great Captain!, which follows the journey of a 17th-century sailor. From Right Away, Great Captain!'s Myspace blog: "The third story/album starts with our hero laying over Anna's lover (and hero's brother). The brother has been killed. His wife has seen what the children saw and we spend a lot of time inside our hero's mind and the reality that he is indeed a murderer of his own flesh and blood." The album was released on June 12, 2012.

== Track listing ==
1. "Blame" - 3:46
2. "When I Met Death" - 2:58
3. "I Am Aware" - 3:10
4. "Old Again" - 2:58
5. "Fur Stop Caring" - 2:57
6. "I Wait For You" - 4:48
7. "Barely Bit Me" - 3:00
8. "Rotten Black Root" - 3:31
9. "We Were Made Out Of Lightning" - 4:24
10. "Memories From The End Pt. 1" - 3:40
11. "Memories From The End Pt. 2" - 3:28
