= Dan Hannon =

American musical artist

- Born: Daniel Jeremy Hannon; July 28, 1973 (age 52); United States
- Genres: rock, contemporary Christian, country, pop
- Occupation: Record producer
- Instruments: electric guitar; keyboard; acoustic guitar; drums
- Years active: 2003–present
- Labels: Columbia Records, Sony Music, Eldest Only, Brash Records, Favorite Gentleman, Fueled By Ramen/Atlantic Records

Dan Hannon is an American record producer, audio engineer, mixer, songwriter, and musician best known for his work with the band Manchester Orchestra. His works have been streamed over one billion times. He has produced, co-produced, co-written, and performed on albums which have sold over 4.5 million copies. His Billboard chart success includes two number-one albums, three number-one songs, 13 top ten albums, 15 top 20 albums, three top 10 rock albums, and four top 10 alternative albums.

In 2007, Manchester Orchestra released their debut album, 'I'm Like A Virgin Losing A Child', which Hannon produced. In 2007.5, he was enlisted to co-produce their second release, Mean Everything To Nothing with Joe Chiccarelli, resulting in the top 10 rock hit "I've Got Friends". Along with the band Hannon produced the Simple Math album, which was released on May 10, 2011. He then produced their follow-up album Cope, which was released on April 1, 2014. Hannon has played an instrumental role in virtually every commercial recording released by the band and continues to be a frequent collaborator with frontman Andy Hull.

Hannon produced, recorded, mixed, and co-wrote "Anything Worth Saying" by Aaron Shust, which became the number one Christian record in 2006 and was nominated for six Dove Awards, winning three at the 38th GMA Dove Awards. The song "My Savior My God" is Billboard's number two Christian/gospel song of the decade of the 2000s. Hannon was nominated for a Dove Award for 'Pop Contemporary Album' of the year in 2007 for Shust's second release, Whispered and Shouted.

== Discography ==
P = Producer • M = Mixer • E = Engineer • I = Instrumentalist • W = Writer • AP = Additional Production

Title	Artist	Year	Credits	Label
Learnin' How To Walk Again	Gary Nichols	2023	P/E/I	
A Casual Introduction Is Hard To Come By	Okay Kenedi	2023	P/W/I/M	
Valley Of Vision	Manchester Orchestra	2021	AP	
Million Masks Of God	Manchester Orchestra	2021	AP	
Wilted	Paris Jackson	2020	AP/E/I	Universal Republic Records
Work From Home	Various Artists	2020	P	
Tiny Changes: A Celebration of Frightened Rabbit's The Midnight Organ Fight	Various Artists	2019	M	Atlantic Records
Beautiful Oblivion	Issues	2019	E	Rise Records
A Black Mile To The Surface	Manchester Orchestra	2016	AP	Universal
Swiss Army Man [Original Motion Picture Soundtrack]	Andy Hull/Robert McDowell	2016	M	
Climbing Season	Climbing Season	2015	P/E/I	
King of This Town	Ricky Gunn	2014	P/E/I/W	New Canvas Entertainment
Cope	Manchester Orchestra	2014	P/I	Universal
Time To Get Right	Jessta James	2013	P/E/I/W	New Canvas Entertainment
Shipwrecked	Among	2013	P/E/I/W	
The Shadowboxers	The Shadowboxers	2011	P/E/M	
Goodnight California	Nate Currin	2011	P/E/I	Archaic Cannon Records
Simple Math LP	Manchester Orchestra	2011	P/E/I	Sony/Columbia
Emily Lynch	Emily Lynch	2010	P/E/I/Co-W/M	Eldest Only
The Grand Magnolias	Paul McDonald, The Grand Magnolias	2010	P/E/I	Boscobel
Honestly	Phil Laeger	2010	P/E/I/W	
Forthcoming Acoustic LP	Trey Rosenkampff	2010	P/E/I	Eldest Only
The Rainy Day Sessions	A Rocket to the Moon	2010	P/E/I	Fueled By Ramen
"Santa Claus Is Coming to Town" for Disney’s Prep & Landing	A Rocket to the Moon	2009	P/E/I	Fueled By Ramen
It Won’t Be Quiet Anymore	Asherel	2009	P/E	Eldest Only
Take Over	Aaron Shust	2009	P/E/Co-W	Brash Records
Mean Everything to Nothing	Manchester Orchestra	2009	Co-P/E/I	Sony Music
WOW Essentials 2	Various Artists	2009	P/E/M/I	Integrity Records
A Little More	Emily Lynch	2009	P/E/M/I	
Only Gets Better From Here	The Beggars' Guild	2009	Co-M	Favorite Gentlemen
The Red Rhythm	Winston Audio	2009	P/E/M/I	Favorite Gentlemen
The Enemy Lovers EP	The Enemy Lovers	2009	P/E/M/I	Chrysalis Records
Sweet Child EP	Public Radio	2008	M	
The Eventually Home	Right Away, Great Captain	2008	Co-P/E	Favorite Gentlemen
Let My Pride Be What's Left Behind	Manchester Orchestra	2008	P/E/M/I	Favorite Gentlemen
WOW Hits 1	Various Artists	2008	P/E/M/I	Provident
God Has Come To Earth (Radio Single)	Aaron Shust	2008	P/E/M/I	Brash
Strangelove	Elevation	2008	P/E/Co-W/I	50 Records
STARBUCKS:Off The Clock (Vol. 1)	Various Artists	2007	P/E/M/I/Co-W	Hear Music
WOW HITS 2008	Various Artists	2007	P/E/M/I	Sparrow Records
I'm Like a Virgin Losing a Child	Manchester Orchestra	2007	P/E/M/I	Sony Music
Breaking Me Down	The Beggars' Guild	2007	P/E/M	
Whispered and Shouted	Aaron Shust	2007	P/E/M/Co-W/I	Brash
WOW HITS 2007	Various Artists	2007	P/E/M/I	EMI/CMG
Blessing	John Waller	2007	E	Beach Street Records/Reunion Records
O Come Emmanuel (Radio Single)	Aaron Shust	2006	P/E/M/I	Brash
Anything Worth Saying	Aaron Shust	2006	P/E/M/I/Co-W	Brash

== Awards and acknowledgments ==
- No. 1 Song of the Year for 2006 on R&R and CRW charts for Aaron Shust's "My Savior, My God"
- No. 2 Song of the Decade (Billboard Best of 2000's Christian Songs) for Aaron Shust's "My Savior, My God"
- Six Top 10 AC singles for Aaron Shust
- Three BMI Publishing Most Performed Songs on Radio Awards
