= On Your Mark =

On Your Mark may refer to:

- On Your Mark (film), a 2021 Chinese film
- "On Your Mark" (song), a 1994 song by Chage and Aska
  - On Your Mark (music video), a 1995 animated music video for the song
- "On Your Mark", a 1963 song by Santo & Johnny
- "On Your Mark", a song by Sara Groves from the album Floodplain

== See also ==
- On Your Mark, Get Set..., a 2010 album by Gobotron
