= I've Got Friends =

Single by Manchester Orchestra

from the album Mean Everything to Nothing
- Released: 2009
- Recorded: 2008
- Genre: Indie rock, alternative rock
- Length: 4:57
- Songwriter: John Andrew Hull

Manchester Orchestra singles chronology
| "I Can Barely Breathe" (2007) | "I've Got Friends" (2009) | "Tony the Tiger" (2009) |

"I've Got Friends" is a song by American indie rock band Manchester Orchestra. The song was released as the lead single from the band's second studio album Mean Everything to Nothing.

The song was Manchester Orchestra's breakthrough hit, peaking at No. 8 on Billboard's Alternative Songs chart in the summer of 2009. It was the band's first single to chart. Until 2017, "I've Got Friends" was Manchester Orchestra's only top-10 chart success and their highest-charting song; this feat was bested by "The Gold", which reached No. 1 on Billboard's Adult Alternative Songs chart.

"I've Got Friends" was used in multiple video game soundtracks, such as MLB 11: The Show and Dirt 3, as well as in the television show The Vampire Diaries.

== Charts ==
| Chart (2009) | Peak position |
|---|---|
| US Alternative Airplay (Billboard) | 8 |
| US Hot Rock & Alternative Songs (Billboard) | 26 |
| UK Physical Singles Chart (Official Charts Company) | 59 |
