= On Your Mark, Get Set... =

Studio album by Gobotron
- Released: January 19, 2010
- Recorded: Summer 2008 at Favorite Gentlemen Studios, Atlanta, GA
- Genre: Indie rock; pop rock; alternative rock
- Length: 31:19
- Label: Favorite Gentlemen Recordings

On Your Mark, Get Set... is the debut album by Gobotron, the solo side project of Manchester Orchestra lead guitarist and backing vocalist Robert "Robot" McDowell, released on January 19, 2010, through Favorite Gentlemen Recordings.

The album was recorded by McDowell himself in the summer of 2008, doing all the writing and playing all the instruments, as a solo project in the Favorite Gentlemen Studios in Atlanta, upon returning from Manchester Orchestra's 2008 headlining tour. Upon going into the pre-production of Manchester Orchestra's second album Mean Everything to Nothing in late 2008, McDowell had to delay the work on this album until summer 2009 when it was finally mixed and mastered.

"Never Turn Around" was featured on Rookie Blue, on the episode "Big Nickel".

== Track listing ==
No.	Title	Length
1.	"Nothing"	0:49
2.	"Nice Things"	3:27
3.	"I Don't Forgive"	3:49
4.	"Never Turn Around"	2:29
5.	"Got It!"	3:18
6.	"Cobbler"	3:17
7.	"Empty"	3:05
8.	"I Lied"	2:59
9.	"Pull It Too"	4:07
10.	"Gold"	3:59

== Personnel ==
- All songs written, performed, recorded, and mixed by Robert "Robot" McDowell
- Mastered by Chris Griffin
- Recorded and mixed at Favorite Gentlemen Recording Studios, Atlanta, Georgia
