= Little Hurricane =

American blues band

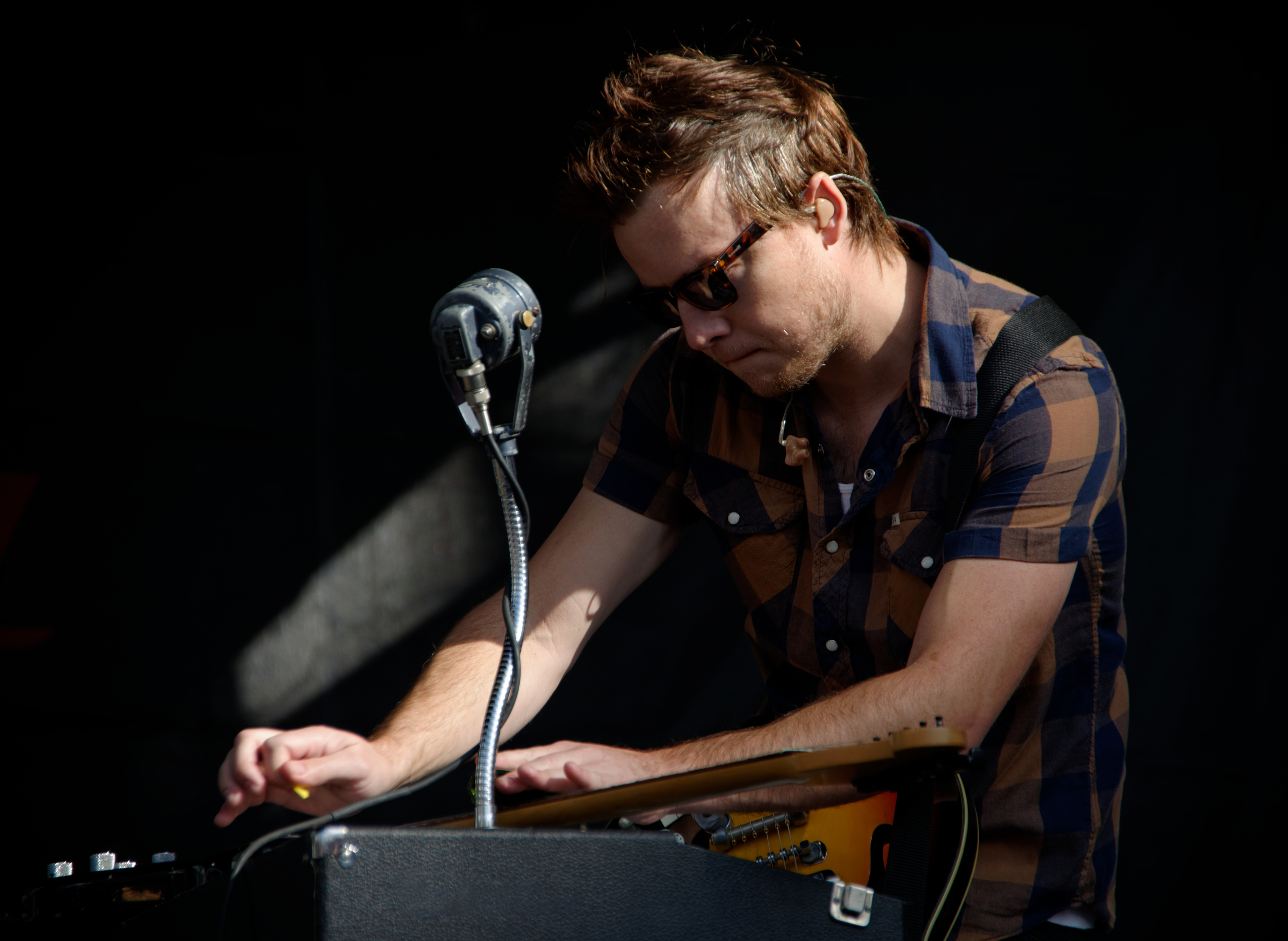
- Little Hurricane in 2014

Background information
- Origin: San Diego, California
- Genres: Blues, rock, lo-fi, Americana
- Years active: 2010–present
- Members: Anthony “Tone” Catalano
- Website: littlehurricanemusic.com

Little Hurricane is a blues-rock act principally comprising Anthony "Tone" Catalano, and including various other musicians.

== History ==
In 2009, Catalano transitioned from audio engineering to working on his own music. He recruited Bassist Andrew Armerding and found drummer Celeste Spina on Craigslist, and after making an impact in the North Park San Diego Music Scene, Little Hurricane began to travel internationally for performances.

Little Hurricane has toured in direct support for multiple North American tours for the English ska band The Specials, as well as supported Manchester Orchestra, White Denim, The John Butler Trio, and the Heartless Bastards.

In 2016, LH licensed its fourth studio album, Same Sun Same Moon, to Mascot Records. It was released on April 14, 2017, and became their second album to appear on the Billboard Heatseekers Albums Chart.

After the Covid19 interruption in live music and having two children, Catalano took a hiatus from touring and releasing music. In 2025, he played live shows on the West Coast of the US, trying out new band members. He has announced on the Little Hurricane Facebook page that he is in the process of recording a brand new album, release date TBA.

== Music ==
The song “Get By” was featured on the television show Revenge season one episode five which aired on ABC. The song is playing in the background during a bar scene.

As Tone mentioned in a video livestream, the song "Crocodile Tears" was originally written for the soundtrack for the movie "Two Hundred Thousand Dirty."

The song, “Bad Business” is also featured on the soundtrack for the video game "MLB The Show 16". The song "Sweet Pea" was featured on ABC's "Mistresses". The song "Haunted Heart" was featured on "Gossip Girl", and their music was featured on ESPN's "Firstwatch". The band was named as an "Artist to Watch" by Sports Illustrated in 2012 and their song "Give em Hell" was featured in a video for the magazine's Swimsuit Edition.

Little Hurricane songs have also been licensed to the movies "The Motel Life", "Two Hundred Thousand Dirty" and Brooklyn Brothers Beat The Best.

The band has been featured on KROQ.

To date, the band has been featured in five Taco Bell TV advertisements. The songs "Haunted Heart", "Hold Me Back", "Trouble Ahead", "Isn't It Great" and a cover of Starland Vocal Band's "Afternoon Delight" were featured in a series of Taco Bell commercials.

Little Hurricane has received several awards from the San Diego Music Awards, including Album of the Year ("Same Sun Same Moon", 2016), Song of the Year ("Heart Skips a Beat", 2015) Artist of the Year (2014) Album of the Year ("Gold Fever", 2014) Best Live Act (2013) Album of the Year ("Homewrecker", 2012) and Best New Artist (2010).

== Performances ==
Little Hurricane has performed in major festivals, including Austin City Limits Music Festival, Bottlerock Napa 2017, Telluride Blues and Brews, Parkenfestivalen, Summerfest, Lollapalooza and South by Southwest. Their performances have been featured in leading publications such as Rolling Stone.

As of 2015, LH has headlined tours and festivals in at least 11 countries including Australia, Norway, Sweden, France, Switzerland, Spain, Germany and England.

== Current and past Members ==
- Anthony "Tone" Catalano – guitar, vocals
- Andrew Armerding - bass
- Celeste Spina – drums
- Ryan Kronenberg - drums
- Hattie "Hat" Craven - vocals, Banjo/Uke/Mandolin

== Discography ==
=== Homewrecker (2011) ===
==== Track listing ====
No.	Title	Length
1.	"Crocodile Tears"	3:55
2.	"Trouble Ahead"	3:57
3.	"Haunted Heart"	2:45
4.	"Fourth of July"	2:53
5.	"Shortbread"	3:38
6.	"Get By"	2:32
7.	"Hold Me Back"	0:51
8.	"Lies"	3:19
9.	"Sun Sets West"	2:28
10.	"Sweet Pea"	3:32
11.	"Tear Bucket"	3:41
12.	"Homewrecker"	5:04
13.	"Give Em Hell"	4:30

=== Stay Classy (A Collection of Cover Songs) (2013) ===
==== Track listing ====
No.	Title	Length
1.	"Dark End of the Street (Percy Sledge)"	2:22
2.	"Bad Moon Rising (Creedence Clearwater Revival)"	3:12
3.	"I'm On Fire (Bruce Springsteen)"	2:20
4.	"Money (Pink Floyd)"	4:04
5.	"Ain't No Sunshine (Bill Withers)"	4:10
6.	"Shadow Boxer (Fiona Apple)"	6:21
7.	"Grounds for Divorce (Elbow)"	3:44
8.	"Blue Jean Blues (ZZ Top)"	4:20
9.	"Natural Blues (Moby/Vera Hall)"	2:36
10.	"Don't Wanna Miss a Thing (Aerosmith)"	3:10

=== Gold Fever (2014) ===
==== Track listing ====
No.	Title	Length
1.	"Summer Air"	2:59
2.	"Upside of Down"	2:44
3.	"Sheep In Wolves Clothes"	3:18
4.	"Boiling Water"	3:24
5.	"No Man's Land"	3:36
6.	"Bones"	2:30
7.	"Breathe"	4:11
8.	"Con Man"	3:30
9.	"Sorry Son"	3:17
10.	"Superblues"	3:10
11.	"Gold Fever"	3:12
12.	"Grand Canyon"	4:08

=== Same Sun Same Moon (2017) ===
==== Track listing ====
No.	Title	Length
1.	"Same Sun Same Moon"	3:22
2.	"Bad Business"	2:58
3.	"OTL"	3:15
4.	"Isn't It Great"	2:53
5.	"Take It Slow"	3:27
6.	"Lake Tahoe Eyes"	3:13
7.	"March Of The Living"	1:48
8.	"Mt. Señorita"	3:03
9.	"For Life"	3:45
10.	"You Remind Me"	2:48
11.	"Slingshot"	3:01
12.	"Moon's Gone Cold"	2:44

=== Love Luck (2019) ===
==== Track listing ====
No.	Title	Length
1.	"Mother"	3:44
2.	"Blood Boil"	2:54
3.	"Love Luck"	3:06
4.	"One Night at a Time"	2:42
5.	"Off the Shelf"	3:28
6.	"Black Blizzard"	3:37
7.	"That Woman"	1:40
8.	"Poor Me"	3:09
9.	"What the Stars Need"	4:02
10.	"Eyes On You"	3:37
