= The Gold (song) =

Single by Manchester Orchestra

from the album A Black Mile to the Surface
- Released: June 9, 2017
- Studio: Favorite Gentlemen, Atlanta, Georgia
- Genre: Folk rock
- Length: 4:33
- Label: Loma Vista
- Songwriter: Andy Hull
- Producer: Catherine Marks

Manchester Orchestra singles chronology
"Every Stone" (2014)	"The Gold" (2017)	"The Moth" (2018)

Music video
- "The Gold" on YouTube

"The Gold" is a song by the American rock band Manchester Orchestra. The song was released on June 9, 2017, as the lead single from their fifth studio album, A Black Mile to the Surface. The song was a chart success for the band, peaking at No. 2 on Billboard's Adult Alternative Songs chart and No. 12 on Billboard's Alternative Songs chart, their first charting single in six years.

== Background and recording ==
In an interview, Manchester Orchestra lead singer Andy Hull stated that "The Gold" deals with issues of trust and learning to communicate. The song was written by Hull. Producer Catherine Marks, who the band was working with for the first time, allowed the band's songwriters to work on the A Black Mile to the Surface album for three months by themselves, during which they deconstructed and added new layers to "The Gold".

== Release ==
"The Gold" was released as a single on June 9, 2017, as part of the A Black Mile to the Surface album announcement. The song was sent for adds to Triple-A radio stations on June 26 and Alternative radio stations on September 12.

A video for "The Gold" was released on the same day as the song, directed by Mike Dempsey and Johnny Chew.

In July 2018, Phoebe Bridgers released a cover version of "The Gold" featuring Manchester Orchestra on instruments.

== Chart performance ==
Chart performance for "The Gold"
Chart (2017–2018)	Peak position
US Alternative Airplay (Billboard)	12
US Adult Alternative Airplay (Billboard)	2
