= The Valley of Vision =

EP by Manchester Orchestra
- Released: March 10, 2023
- Recorded: 2020
- Studios: Concord Studios, New York City; Echo Mountain, Asheville, North Carolina; Favorite Gentlemen, Atlanta, Georgia; Sound City Studios, Los Angeles, California
- Genre: Indie rock
- Length: 25:50
- Language: English
- Label: Loma Vista
- Producers: Ethan Gruska; Andy Hull; Catherine Marks; Jamie Martens; Robert McDowell; Kyle Metcalfe

Manchester Orchestra chronology
The Million Masks of God (2021)	The Valley of Vision (2023)

The Valley of Vision is the eighth extended play by American indie rock band Manchester Orchestra. Recorded during the sessions for their previous studio album The Million Masks of God, this work was released with an accompanying virtual reality movie directed by Isaac Deitz. The EP was released digitally on March 10, 2023, on Loma Vista Recordings, with physical releases following on April 7, 2023.

== Reception ==
Editors at AllMusic rated this album 4 out of 5 stars, with critic Matt Collar writing that this release has "a cathartic, deeply ruminative vibe" that takes listeners "on a journey from solitary confessions made in a dark room to a wailing wall of bright pop catharsis". Writing for Alternative Press, Matt Mitchell notes the somber tone of the music calling it "solemn, enduring" and that it "feels like Manchester Orchestra is shedding their former self" due to the restrained nature of the music. Clash Music published a 7 out of 10 review of the album, stating that it "oozes emo sensibilities" and is "a melancholy, broody, moody and fun project to get lost in", but criticizing Andy Hull's vocal performance. Rowan5215 of Sputnikmusic rated this release a 3.4 out of 5, noting the slowness of the band and commenting that this music's tone is "positively withdrawn" and "a touch too sedate".

== Track listing ==
1. "Capital Karma" (Andy Hull and Danny Parker) – 3:36
2. "The Way" (Hull) – 3:54
3. "Quietly" (Hull) – 4:53
4. "Letting Go" (Hull, Jamie Martens, and Robert McDowell) – 3:57
5. "Lose You Again" (Hull and Dan Wilson) – 3:42
6. "Rear View" (Hull) – 5:48

== Personnel ==
Manchester Orchestra

- Andy Hull – guitar, keyboards, percussion, vocals, production
- Robert McDowell – guitar, keyboards, backing vocals, programming, production
- Andy Prince – bass guitar
- Tim Very – drums, percussion

Additional personnel

- Paul Blakemore – mastering
- Mike Dempsey – photography
- Dowell Gandy – assistant engineering
- Ethan Gruska – piano, additional production
- Dan Hannon – additional production, engineering
- Christopher Leckie – esign
- Catherine Marks – engineering, mixing, additional production
- Jamie Martens – assistant engineering, engineering, additional Production
- Kyle Metcalfe – additional production
- Caroline Swon – backing vocals

== See also ==
- List of 2023 albums
