= The Eventually Home =

Studio album by Right Away, Great Captain
- Released: November 11, 2008
- Genre: Folk rock
- Label: Favorite Gentlemen

Right Away, Great Captain chronology
The Bitter End (2006)	The Eventually Home (2008)	The Church of the Good Thief (2012)

Professional ratings
Review scores
Source	Rating
AbsolutePunk.net	(85%) link
Paste	(75/100) link
Silent Sound Waves	link

The Eventually Home is the second release from Andy Hull's solo project, Right Away, Great Captain. The concept record conveys the journey of a 17th-century sailor who has been betrayed by his wife who has committed adultery with his own brother. In this second part of the planned trilogy, the sailor returns home in the song "Memories from a Shore" with the intention of killing both his wife and brother.

== Release ==
In July 2008, it was announced that The Eventually Home was completely tracked and almost mixed. Hull was aiming to release the album later in the year. On September 5, it was announced that the album would be released in November. On September 24, "Anna No" and "Dressed in Blue" were posted on the band's Myspace profile. The Eventually Home was originally planned for released on November 5 through independent label Favorite Gentlemen Recordings. However, it was instead released on November 11.

== Track listing ==
1. "Down to Your Soul" - 3:14
2. "Devil Dressed in Blue" - 1:50
3. "Cutting Off the Blood to Ten" - 2:31
4. "Once Like You" - 5:31
5. "What a Pity" - 1:47
6. "Father Brian Finn" - 5:30
7. "Memories from a Shore" (titled "Anna No" on the CD release) - 2:22
8. "Oh No, I Tried" (titled "Memories on a Shore" on the CD release) - 3:03
9. "I Am a Vampire" - 6:55
10. "I Was a Cage" - 4:30
