= The Bitter End (Right Away, Great Captain album) =

Studio album by Right Away, Great Captain
- Released: January 14, 2007
- Genre: Folk rock
- Length: 47:37
- Label: Favorite Gentlemen Recordings

Right Away, Great Captain chronology
The Bitter End (2007)	The Eventually Home (2008)

Professional ratings
Review scores
Source	Rating
AbsolutePunk.net	(83%) link

The Bitter End is the first release from Andy Hull's solo project, Right Away, Great Captain. The album was recorded in three days near Bastian, VA in August 2006. It is a concept record focusing on a 17th-century sailor at sea for three years, each song being a journal entry to his family at home or his captain.

== Track listing ==
1. "Oh, Deceiver" - 4:05
2. "Right Away, Great Captain!" - 5:20
3. "Memories on a Deck, Pt. 1" - 2:58
4. "Memories on a Deck, Pt. 2" - 1:41
5. "Night Marry You" - 2:26
6. "Love, Come and Save Me" - 3:19
7. "Like Lions Do" - 4:02
8. "Right Ahead, Young Sailor!" - 1:54
9. "What a Lullaby, What a Way to Die" - 2:22
10. "Haunt While I Sleep" - 3:04
11. "Gasoline Family" - 4:56
12. "Cause I'm So Scared of Dying (The Captain's Heroic Fall)" - 4:58
13. "Sacred Heart (A Sailor's Drunken Eulogy)" - 2:21
14. "I'm Not Ready to Forgive You" - 4:21
15. "Captain, I'm Fine and Thank You for Everything" - 2:34
