= Let My Pride Be What's Left Behind =

EP by Manchester Orchestra
- Released: October 7, 2008
- Recorded: 2008
- Genre: Indie rock
- Length: 21:50
- Label: Favorite Gentlemen; Canvasback
- Producer: Dan Hannon

Manchester Orchestra chronology
I'm Like a Virgin Losing a Child (2006)	Let My Pride Be What's Left Behind (2008)	Mean Everything to Nothing (2009)

Let My Pride Be What's Left Behind is the third EP released by Manchester Orchestra in 2008. It was released via Favorite Gentlemen / Canvasback Recordings on October 7, 2008.

== Track listing ==
No.	Title	Length
1.	"I Can Feel a Hot One"	4:19
2.	"I Was a Lid"	4:51
3.	"Wolves at Night" (WBRU FM)	5:22
4.	"Badges and Badges" (Live from Daytrotter)	2:49
5.	"Sleeper 1972" (Live from The Loft/Atlanta, GA)	4:32

== In popular culture ==
The song "I Can Feel a Hot One" was featured on the television show Gossip Girl in September 2008.
