= Swiss Army Man =

2016 film by Daniel Scheinert and Daniel Kwan

- Theatrical release poster
- Directed by: Daniel Scheinert; Daniel Kwan
- Written by: Daniel Scheinert; Daniel Kwan
- Produced by: Eyal Rimmon; Lauren Mann; Lawrence Inglee; Jonathan Wang; Miranda Bailey; Amanda Marshall
- Starring: Paul Dano; Daniel Radcliffe; Mary Elizabeth Winstead
- Cinematography: Larkin Seiple
- Edited by: Matthew Hannam
- Music by: Andy Hull; Robert McDowell; Jeremy Michael King
- Production companies: Tadmor; Astrakan Films AB; Cold Iron Pictures; Blackbird Films; Prettybird
- Distributed by: A24
- Release dates: January 22, 2016 (Sundance); June 24, 2016 (United States)
- Running time: 97 minutes
- Country: United States
- Language: English
- Budget: $3 million
- Box office: $5.8 million

Swiss Army Man is a 2016 American surrealist comedy-drama film written and directed by Daniel Scheinert and Daniel Kwan in their feature directorial debuts. The film stars Paul Dano, Daniel Radcliffe, and Mary Elizabeth Winstead.

Swiss Army Man premiered at the 2016 Sundance Film Festival on January 22, and began a theatrical limited release in the United States on June 24, 2016, before opening wide on July 1, 2016. The film was positively received by critics and has since developed a cult following for the Daniels.

== Plot ==
Hank Thompson is stranded on an island and nearly hangs himself, but sees a body wash up on the beach. He tries to resuscitate it, but the corpse just replies with incessant flatulence. As the tide begins to wash the corpse away, Hank watches as its flatulence propels the corpse around on the surface of the water. Hank ties a rope around the corpse's mouth and mounts him to ride it across the ocean, landing on a mainland shore but still far from civilization. That night, the two of them hide in a cave from a rainstorm, and after the runoff pours into the corpse's mouth, Hank realizes the next morning that the corpse can be a seemingly infinite source of drinkable water. The corpse also begins a slow transition into speaking and acquires a grasp of the English language, adopting the name Manny. Hank and Manny continue their quest, using Manny's erections (fueled by a swimsuit magazine they find) as a compass. Manny has forgotten everything about his former life, and Hank tries to teach him various concepts about life, but Manny's childlike and shameless interpretations of these concepts conflict with what Hank considers socially acceptable behavior. Hank also confesses his traumas stemming from the early death of his mother, and his poor social relationship with his father.

Hank eventually learns how to use Manny's body in various practical ways to facilitate traversing the hostile environment. Over the course of their journey, Hank teaches Manny the joys of dining out, going to movies, and partying, using crudely constructed props and sets made from plants and garbage. Using these, Hank leads Manny to believe that Manny is in love with a woman named Sarah, who rides the bus alone every day. Manny falls in love with Sarah, and this love motivates him to find civilization with Hank. In reality, Hank is very much in love with Sarah, having seen her riding the bus every day but never talking to her due to his own shyness. He has a photo of her that he took secretly while on the bus set as the wallpaper on his phone and follows her on social media. As he looks through her social media profile photos, it is revealed that Sarah is happily married and has a child.

Hank impersonates Sarah to help Manny learn how to talk to women, but they end up having a connection, eventually sharing a kiss. They have a falling out after Hank reveals that Manny never knew Sarah during his life. Feeling betrayed over Hank's hypocrisy and self-restraint, Manny states he wishes to be fully dead again. Hank experiences strange mental flashes of surreal images recalling his journey and suggests that one of Manny's powers is to affect his mind. Despite the tension between them, when Hank is attacked by a bear, Manny moves under his own power for the first time, crawling after his injured friend and igniting one of his farts from their campfire to scare the bear away. Hank loses consciousness and wakes up to Manny carrying him to Sarah's house, despite Hank's protests.

While Sarah is in the house, Manny talks to Sarah's daughter, Crissie. Expecting her to be impressed, he demonstrates several of his powers, inadvertently frightening her with his compass-erection, which Hank quickly slaps down. Sarah is alerted by her daughter's crying and calls the police at the sight of Hank and Manny's once-again inanimate corpse. The first responders soon patch up Hank but call him Manny. They find Hank's phone on Manny's body, find Hank's father's phone number in the phone, and summon him to identify the body. When his father arrives, Hank hides behind the ambulance. Hank's father can't bring himself to open the body bag. The cops discover the photos of Sarah on his phone and ask Sarah about it, who claims not to know either Hank or Manny. During a local television news interview at the site, Hank deliriously professes on air his gratitude for Manny and his magical powers and runs away with Manny's body. Hank's pursuers discover the structures he built. The police, Sarah, her husband, her daughter, a reporter, a camera man, and Hank's father all follow him to the beach. Cornered, Hank lets out a long fart, and the police arrest him. Manny then begins to fart violently. To everyone's shock, horror, and in Crissie and Hank's father's case, amusement, Manny floats back into the ocean and skims quickly away, propelled by his own flatulence, as he and Hank share one last smile.

== Cast ==
- Paul Dano as Hank Thompson
- Daniel Radcliffe as Manny
- Mary Elizabeth Winstead as Sarah Johnson
- Timothy Eulich as Preston
- Marika Casteel as Reporter
- Richard Gross as Hank's Dad
- Antonia Ribero as Crissie
- Aaron Marshall as Police Officer
- Andy Hull as Cameraman
- Shane Carruth as Coroner

== Production ==
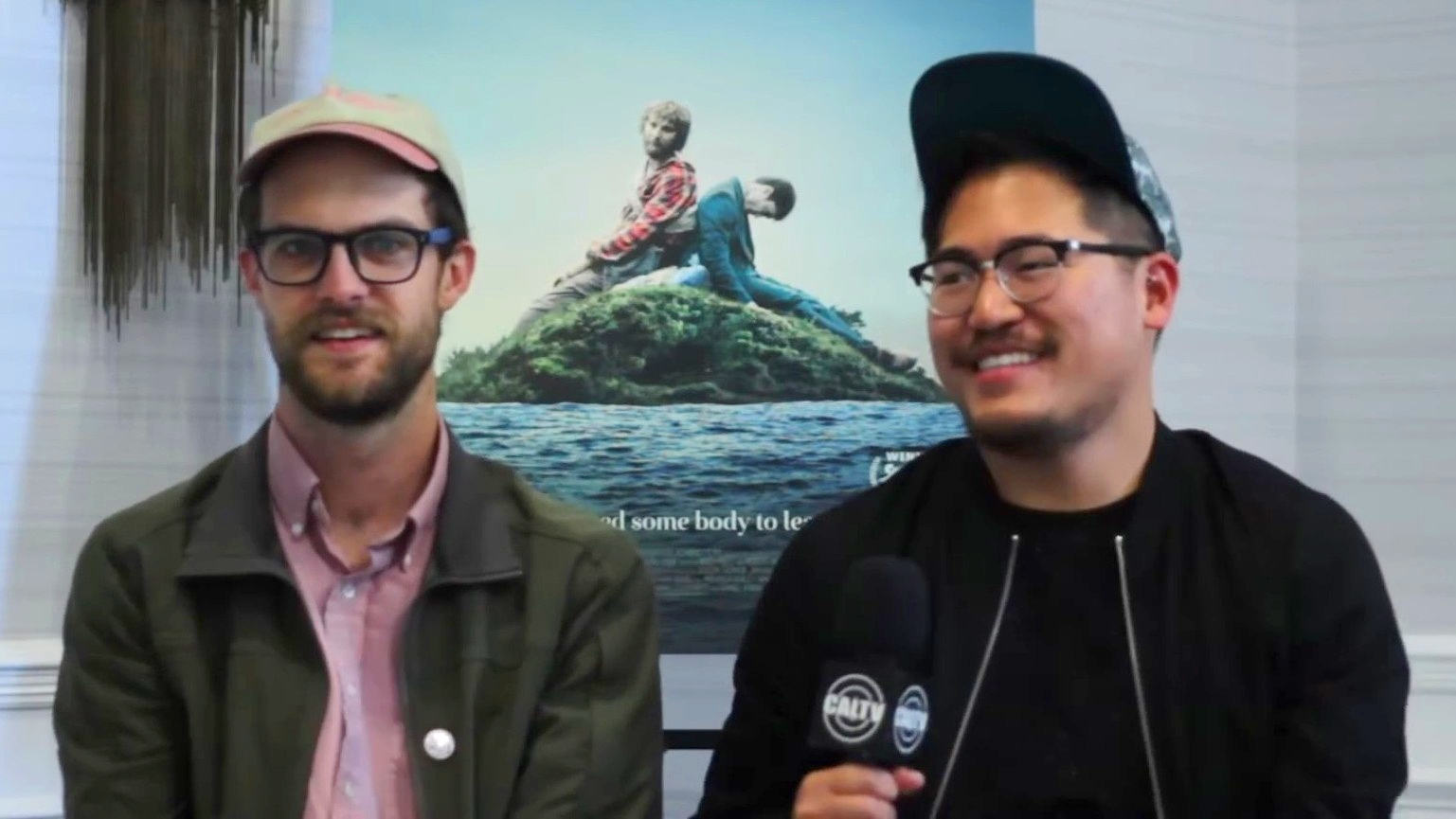
Writers-directors Scheinert and Kwan promoting the film in 2016

Throughout years of various meetings with Hollywood producers, the Daniels pitched the film as a break from the norm of typical Hollywood blockbusters. When initially pitching the film as a joke, the Daniels were asked, "Why don't you just make it?" The Daniels obliged by drafting multiple versions of the script, including submitting one of the drafts at Sundance Labs in 2013, which they later attended in 2014. In June 2015, Paul Dano, Daniel Radcliffe, and Mary Elizabeth Winstead joined the cast of the film, with Daniel Kwan and Daniel Scheinert set to direct from the screenplay written by them both. When looking for actors to execute their vision in both an acting and singing capacity, the directors selected the two male leads for the film. Principal photography began on July 14, 2015, and ended on August 7, 2015. Filming took place over the course of 22 days throughout California, including in San Pedro and Humboldt County for underwater work and wide vistas, respectively. Daniel Radcliffe said that music from the film was played on set: "Robert composed music before the shoot started which never ever happens in film. We could hear the music on set for certain scenes."

== Release ==
Swiss Army Man had its world premiere at the Sundance Film Festival on January 22, 2016. Shortly after, A24 acquired U.S. rights to the film, and later acquired global rights to the film, partnering with distributors who had already acquired global rights. The film was originally scheduled to be released on June 17, 2016, but was later pushed back a week to June 24, in a limited bow. It opened in a wide release on July 1.

== Reception ==
=== Critical response ===
Swiss Army Man has received generally positive reviews from film critics. Review aggregation website Rotten Tomatoes gives it a 73% approval rating, based on reviews from 209 critics, with an average rating of 6.8/10. The site's critical consensus states: "Disarmingly odd and thoroughly well-acted, Swiss Army Man offers adventurous viewers an experience as rewarding as it is impossible to categorize." Metacritic gives the film a rating of 64 out of 100, based on reviews from 36 critics, indicating "generally favorable reviews".

During the film's world premiere at Sundance, some audience members walked out, alienated by the film's bizarre premise.

Peter Debruge of Variety gave the film a positive review, writing, "On one hand the most singularly unique competition title to debut at Sundance in ages, while on the other, a project still in drastic need of development (despite a tour through five different Sundance Institute labs, including one for mixing all those fart effects in Dolby Atmos), this movie wears its weirdness as a badge of honor—as well it should." Leslie Felperin of The Hollywood Reporter felt that "forming a counterpoint to all the bodily function knockabout, Dano and Radcliffe, both fully committing with delectable zeal, project a certain tragic fragility that adds heft to the proceedings."

=== Accolades ===
Award	Date of ceremony	Category	Recipients	Result
Sundance Film Festival	January 31, 2016	Directing Award: U.S. Dramatic	Daniel Kwan and Daniel Scheinert	Won
Austin Film Critics Association	December 28, 2016	Best First Film	Swiss Army Man	Nominated
Gotham Awards	November 28, 2016	Bingham Ray Breakthrough Director Award	Daniel Kwan and Daniel Scheinert	Nominated
Independent Spirit Awards	February 25, 2017	Best First Feature	Daniel Kwan, Daniel Scheinert, Miranda Bailey, Lawrence Inglee, Lauren Mann, Amanda Marshall, Eyal Rimmon, and Jonathan Wang	Nominated
Independent Spirit Awards	February 25, 2017	Best Editing	Matthew Hannam	Nominated
Neuchâtel International Fantastic Film Festival	July 9, 2016	Audience Award	Swiss Army Man	Won
Neuchâtel International Fantastic Film Festival	July 9, 2016	Best Production Design	Jason Kisvarday	Won
Neuchâtel International Fantastic Film Festival	July 9, 2016	International Critic's Award	Swiss Army Man	Won
Neuchâtel International Fantastic Film Festival	July 9, 2016	Narcisse Award for Best Film	Swiss Army Man	Nominated
Toronto Film Critics Association	December 11, 2016	Best First Feature	Swiss Army Man	Runner-up
