= Hope (Manchester Orchestra album) =

Studio album by Manchester Orchestra
- Released: September 16, 2014
- Recorded: June 2014–July 2014
- Genre: Indie rock; acoustic rock
- Length: 41:08
- Label: Loma Vista Recordings; Favorite Gentlemen
- Producer: Manchester Orchestra

Manchester Orchestra chronology
Cope (2014)	Hope (2014)	A Black Mile to the Surface (2017)

Hope is an acoustic album from Atlanta-based indie rock band Manchester Orchestra. It was released on September 16, 2014 as a digital download through Loma Vista Recordings and the band's own independent label, Favorite Gentlemen. Hope serves as a companion piece to the band's fourth album Cope, with each track being an acoustic re-imagining of a song from Cope.

== Critical reception ==
Professional ratings
Review scores
Source	Rating
AllMusic	4/5 stars
FDRMXluy	4.1 stars on a 5 point scale
Punknews	4/5 stars

Hope generally received a positive reception upon release. Many reviewers commented on Manchester Orchestra's "masterful" reworking of Cope into an acoustic work.

In a four-star review for AllMusic, Matt Collar mentioned that, "Hope works in perfect counterpoint to its darker, harsher predecessor. And certainly, while Hull has a knack for crafting blistering emo-epics, at the core of many of his songs there is a melodic lyricism and tender emotionality that lends itself to just the kind of delicate treatment achieved on Hope."

== Track listing ==
No.	Title	Length
1.	"Top Notch"	3:57
2.	"Choose You"	4:07
3.	"Girl Harbor"	3:55
4.	"The Mansion"	3:22
5.	"The Ocean"	4:22
6.	"Every Stone"	4:40
7.	"All That I Really Wanted"	3:37
8.	"Trees"	3:11
9.	"Indentions"	3:56
10.	"See It Again"	2:56
11.	"Cope"	3:05
