= I'm Like a Virgin Losing a Child =

Studio album by Manchester Orchestra
- Released: October 14, 2006
- Genre: Indie rock; alternative rock
- Length: 43:55
- Label: Favorite Gentlemen; Canvasback

Manchester Orchestra chronology
You Brainstorm, I Brainstorm, but Brilliance Needs a Good Editor (2005)	I'm Like a Virgin Losing a Child (2006)	Let My Pride Be What's Left Behind (2008)

Professional ratings
Review scores
Source	Rating
AbsolutePunk	(90%)
IGN	(8.9/10)
Pitchfork Media	(5.1/10)
Rocklouder	5/5 stars
Sputnikmusic	4/5 stars

I'm Like a Virgin Losing a Child is the debut studio album from Atlanta alternative rock band Manchester Orchestra. It was released via Favorite Gentlemen/Canvasback Recordings on October 14, 2006.

The song "Wolves at Night" is featured in the video game NHL 08.

== Track listing ==
All tracks are written by Andy Hull

No.	Title	Length
1.	"Wolves at Night"	4:05
2.	"Now That You're Home"	3:08
3.	"The Neighborhood Is Bleeding"	2:49
4.	"I Can Feel Your Pain"	2:52
5.	"Where Have You Been?"	6:15
6.	"I Can Barely Breathe"	5:01
7.	"Sleeper 1972"	4:08
8.	"Golden Ticket"	3:31
9.	"Alice and Interiors"	4:19
10.	"Don't Let Them See You Cry"	1:45
11.	"Colly Strings"	5:59

== Personnel ==
=== Manchester Orchestra ===
- Andy Hull - lyrics, vocals, guitar, keyboards
- Chris Freeman - percussion, keyboards
- Jonathan Corley - bass
- Jeremiah Edmond - drums, percussion
- Robert McDowell - guitar, intern

=== Additional personnel ===
- Andy Lee - guitar on "The Neighborhood Is Bleeding"
- Dan Hannon - producer, mixing, guitar
- Glenn Schick - mastering
- Jordan Noel - artwork
