= You Brainstorm, I Brainstorm, but Brilliance Needs a Good Editor =

You Brainstorm, I Brainstorm But Brilliance Needs a Good Editor

EP by Manchester Orchestra
- Released: 2005
- Recorded: 2005
- Genre: Indie rock
- Length: 21:33
- Label: Favorite Gentlemen
- Producer: Andy Hull

Manchester Orchestra chronology
Nobody Sings Anymore (2005)	You Brainstorm, I Brainstorm But Brilliance Needs a Good Editor (2005)	I'm Like a Virgin Losing a Child (2006)

You Brainstorm, I Brainstorm, but Brilliance Needs a Good Editor is the second extended play (EP) by American rock band Manchester Orchestra, released through Favorite Gentlemen Recordings in 2005.

Favorite Gentlemen made the EP available for purchase through the band's merchandising website.

On March 26, 2016, a partial image of a vinyl pressing of the EP was posted on lead singer and principle songwriter Andy Hull's Instagram.

This vinyl pressing was not made available for purchase until November 23, 2016 (the night of Manchester Orchestra's seventh-annual Thanksgiving-eve concert at the Center Stage Music Complex in Atlanta, GA). The limited edition EP featured white vinyl with all five tracks on side A, and an etched image of the album artwork on side B.

== Track listing ==
No.	Title	Length
1.	"The Procession"	3:27
2.	"Alice and Interiors"	4:59
3.	"Slow to Learn"	2:40
4.	"I'd Rather Have"	4:33
5.	"Play It Again, Sam! You Don't Have Any Feathers"	5:54

== Notes ==
- The album artwork/design/layout was done by Jordan Noel of GingerGroupDesigns.
