= Winston Audio =

- Origin: Atlanta, Georgia, U.S.
- Genre: Indie rock
- Years active: 2001–2010
- Label: Favorite Gentlemen Recordings
- Members: Daniel DeWitt
- Past members: Dan Gleason; Zach Brown; Shane Lenzen O'Connell; Gerren Fish; Randy Chester; Matt Hau; Matt Keef; Chris Turner; Benji Lee; Andy Lee; Michael Adkins
- Website: Official Website

Winston Audio was an indie rock and grunge rock band based in Atlanta, Georgia, that formed in 2003 and has existed in several incarnations since its creation. The band is currently signed to Favorite Gentlemen Recordings and is on an indefinite hiatus.

== History ==
According to the band, Winston Audio "was formed in 2001, but the music they create today really began in 2006." In 2006, the band released its first EP, Come On, Hibernate, but the band remained largely silent until 2009, when they released The Red Rhythm. With the release of its first full-length album, Winston Audio has received generally favorable reviews, citing the band's unmistakable influences from 90's grunge rock. Winston Audio's sound has been described as hard rock with Southern rock and blues undertones.

== Current band members ==
- Daniel DeWitt (Lead Vocals/Bass/Guitar)

== Former members ==
- Dan Gleason (-2010) (Guitar/Keys/Vocals)
- Zach Brown (-2010) (Guitar)
- Shane Lenzen-O'Connell (2007–2010) (Drums)
- Gerren Fish (2001–2003) (Lead Vocals/Guitar)
- Randy Chester (2001) (Bass)
- Matt Hau (2001–2006) (Drums)
- Matt Keef (2002–2005) (Guitar)
- Chris Turner (2006–2007) (Guitar)
- Benji Lee (2006–2007) (Drums)
- Andy Lee (2007–2008) (Drums)
- Michael Adkins (2003–2009) (Guitar)

== Tours ==
Winston Audio completed its first national tour with Manchester Orchestra, Audrye Sessions, and Fun in Summer 2009. In the fall of 2009, the band toured with Colour Revolt, UME and Meat Puppets.

Date	Other Acts	Venue	City
Jul 18, 2004		Heaven, The Masquerade	Atlanta, GA
Aug 15, 2006	Young Agent Jones, Eric Scholtz	Smith's Olde Bar	Atlanta, GA
Mar 21, 2007		Vinyl	Atlanta, GA
May 18, 2007		Heaven, The Masquerade	Atlanta, GA
Aug 09, 2007	Manchester Orchestra, Colour Revolt, Wild Sweet Orange	The Loft	Atlanta, GA
Aug 25, 2007	Summerbirds in the Cellar, estates	Vinyl	Atlanta, GA
Jan 25, 2008	Manchester Orchestra, Joy in Tomorrow	The Loft	Atlanta, GA
Feb 09, 2008	Harrison Hudson, Tommy & The Whale, All Get Out, Disappointed By Candy	Vinyl	Atlanta, GA
May 30, 2008	O'Brother, All Get Out	Vinyl	Atlanta, GA
Aug 02, 2008	Death On Two Wheels, The Weeks, Midnight Cinema	Vinyl	Atlanta, GA
Oct 02, 2008	Ski Club, Love Like Fire, The Modern Society	Smith's Olde Bar	Atlanta, GA
Mar 11, 2009		40 Watt Club	Athens, GA
Apr 21, 2009	Manchester Orchestra, Audrye Sessions, Fun.	Exit / In	Nashville, TN
Apr 23, 2009	Manchester Orchestra, Audrye Sessions, Fun.	Cat's Cradle	Carrboro, NC
Apr 24, 2009	Manchester Orchestra, Audrye Sessions	The National	Richmond, VA
Apr 25, 2009	Manchester Orchestra, Audrye Sessions, Fun.	Ottobar	Baltimore, MD
Apr 26, 2009	Manchester Orchestra, Audrye Sessions, Fun.	Trocadero Theatre	Philadelphia, PA
Apr 29, 2009	Manchester Orchestra, Audrye Sessions, Fun.	Bowery Ballroom	New York, NY
Apr 30, 2009	Manchester Orchestra, Fun.	The Middle East - Downstairs	Cambridge, MA
May 01, 2009	Manchester Orchestra, Audrye Sessions, Fun.	Water Street Music Hall	Rochester, NY
May 02, 2009	Manchester Orchestra, Audrye Sessions, Fun.	The Theater, Mr. Smalls	Millvale, PA
May 03, 2009	Manchester Orchestra, Audrye Sessions, Fun.	Grog Shop	Cleveland Heights, OH
May 06, 2009	Manchester Orchestra, Audrye Sessions, Fun.	Skully's Music-Diner	Columbus, OH
May 07, 2009	Manchester Orchestra, Audrye Sessions, Fun.	Mad Hatter Club	Covington, KY
May 08, 2009	Manchester Orchestra, Audrye Sessions	Subterranean	Chicago, IL
May 09, 2009	Manchester Orchestra, Audrye Sessions, Fun.	Station 4	Saint Paul, MN
May 12, 2009	Manchester Orchestra, Audrye Sessions, Fun.	The Marquis Theater	Denver, CO
May 13, 2009	Manchester Orchestra, Audrye Sessions, Fun.	Avalon Theater	Salt Lake City, UT
May 15, 2009	Manchester Orchestra, Audrye Sessions, Fun.	El Corazon	
May 16, 2009	Manchester Orchestra, Audrye Sessions, Fun.	Biltmore Ca	
May 17, 2009	Manchester Orchestra, Audrye Sessions, Fun.		
May 19, 2009	Manchester Orchestra, Audrye Sessions, Fun.		
May 21, 2009	Manchester Orchestra, Audrye Sessions, Fun.		
May 22, 2009	Manchester Orchestra, Audrye Sessions, Fun., Cowboy Mouth, Dusty Rhodes and the River Band		
May 26, 2009	Manchester Orchestra, Audrye Sessions, Fun.		

still working on the table...

== Discography ==
=== Albums ===
- 2009: The Red Rhythm
- 2006: Come on, Hibernate

=== EPs ===
- 2006: Come On, Hibernate EP
- 2004: The First Quarter EP
