= Right Away, Great Captain! =

American musical artist

- Origin: Atlanta, Georgia, United States
- Genres: Indie rock; indie folk
- Years active: 2004–present
- Label: Favorite Gentlemen Recordings
- Members: Andy Hull
- Website: Official Bandcamp; Official MySpace

Right Away, Great Captain! is the solo side project of Manchester Orchestra's lead singer, Andy Hull. Debut album The Bitter End was released on January 14, 2007 via Favorite Gentlemen Recordings. The follow-up, The Eventually Home, was released on November 11, 2008, also on Hull's label Favorite Gentlemen Recordings. On February 10, 2010, he announced the third and final installment of his solo project's trilogy, The Church of the Good Thief, which was released on June 12, 2012. An additional bonus album consisting of B-sides, demos and one-offs, The Lost Sea, was released on July 13, 2012.

The album trilogy chronicles a 17th-century sailor who catches his wife and brother having an affair. He then sets out to sea instead of confronting the two while the anger slowly builds in him. The rest of the trilogy tells the tale of the sailor finding the "Great Captain" who is the namesake of the band, trying to cope with the betrayal, becoming addicted to opiates, and eventually killing his brother in the heat of the moment.

Doing a few dates with both supporting his own band Manchester Orchestra and Kevin Devine in 2008 and 2009, Hull did his biggest shows under this project as a support act for his supergroup Bad Books which toured in October 2010, in support of their self-titled debut album.

In 2012, RAGC released a 4xLP boxset which included The Bitter End, The Eventually Home, The Church of the Good Thief, The Lost Sea and handwritten lyrics, with the albums signed by Andy Hull. It was priced at $60 and sold out in a few days. After the first boxset sold out, Hull made various references to a repress of the set on Twitter in 2013, in an AMA Manchester Orchestra did on Reddit in 2014, and in another tweet in 2015. On January 18, 2016 the boxset repress went up for sale with only 1,000 copies available and was sold through the band's Bandcamp page. A vinyl repress of the trilogy was released in 2022.

== Discography ==
Studio albums

- The Bitter End (2007)
- The Eventually Home (2008)
- The Church of the Good Thief (2012)

Compilation albums

- The Lost Sea (2012)
- Right Away, Great Captain! Live at the Knitting Factory (2016)
