= NHL 08 =

2007 video game

- Eric Staal on the cover of NHL 08
- Developers: EA Canada (PS3, Xbox 360); HB Studios (PS2, PC)
- Publisher: EA Sports
- Series: NHL series
- Platforms: Microsoft Windows; PlayStation 2 PlayStation 3 Xbox 360
- Release: NA: September 11, 2007 (PC, PS2, PS3); NA: September 12, 2007 (X360); AU: September 20, 2007 (PC, X360); EU: September 21, 2007 (PC, X360); AU: September 21, 2007 (PS3); EU: September 27, 2007 (PS3); AU: October 11, 2007 (PS2); EU: October 12, 2007 (PS2)
- Genre: Sports
- Modes: Single-player, multiplayer

NHL 08 is a video game released on September 11, 2007 in North America. This was the first installment released on the PlayStation 3.

== Gameplay ==
NHL 08 features a new and improved "Skill Stick System," which EA says will allow gamers to more easily control the puck. NHL 08 also includes "Goalie Mode," where users can control their team's goalie with a new third-person camera. Another new feature is the ability to create custom plays, where you can take part in creating custom plays in practice mode.

=== Game modes ===
'Dynasty Mode' allows users to create a dream team and play through to the Stanley Cup. However, there is no fantasy draft on the seventh generation version of the game (Xbox 360, PlayStation 3); this mode appears only on the PC and PlayStation 2 versions.

The game features the-then 29 teams of the American Hockey League (AHL). Players can develop talent through the AHL, and then call up their prospects to play in the NHL. Every AHL team is fully playable. Sweden's Elitserien and Finland's SM-liiga are also included on the Xbox 360 and PlayStation 3. However, the Deutsche Eishockey Liga (DEL) and Czech Extraliga are only to be found on the PC and PlayStation 2 versions.

== Reception ==
The PlayStation 3 and Xbox 360 versions received "favorable" reviews, while the PlayStation 2 and PC versions received "mixed or average reviews", according to the review aggregation website Metacritic.

Games for Windows: The Official Magazine gave it a score of five out of ten. The game won GameSpot's "Best Sports Game of 2007" award.

During the 11th Annual Interactive Achievement Awards, NHL 08 received a nomination for "Sports Game of the Year" by the Academy of Interactive Arts & Sciences.

Reception

Aggregate score
Aggregator	Score			
Aggregator	PC	PS2	PS3	Xbox 360
Metacritic	65/100	70/100	86/100	85/100

Review scores
Publication	Score			
Publication	PC	PS2	PS3	Xbox 360
Electronic Gaming Monthly	N/A	N/A	9.17/10	9.17/10
Eurogamer	N/A	N/A	N/A	7/10
Game Informer	N/A	N/A	8.5/10	8.5/10
GamePro	N/A	N/A	N/A	4.5/5
GameRevolution	N/A	N/A	C	C
GameSpot	6/10	6.5/10	8.5/10	8.5/10
GameSpy	N/A	N/A	4.5/5	4.5/5
GameZone	N/A	7/10	8.9/10	9/10
IGN	N/A	N/A	8.6/10	8.9/10
Official Xbox Magazine (US)	N/A	N/A	N/A	8.5/10
PC Gamer (US)	35%	N/A	N/A	N/A
PlayStation: The Official Magazine	N/A	N/A	8.5/10	N/A
The A.V. Club	N/A	N/A	N/A	A

== Legacy ==
NHL 08 was included in EA Sports 08 Collection in 2008 along with Madden NFL 08, Tiger Woods PGA Tour 08, FIFA 08 and NBA Live 08.
