= Cope (Manchester Orchestra album) =

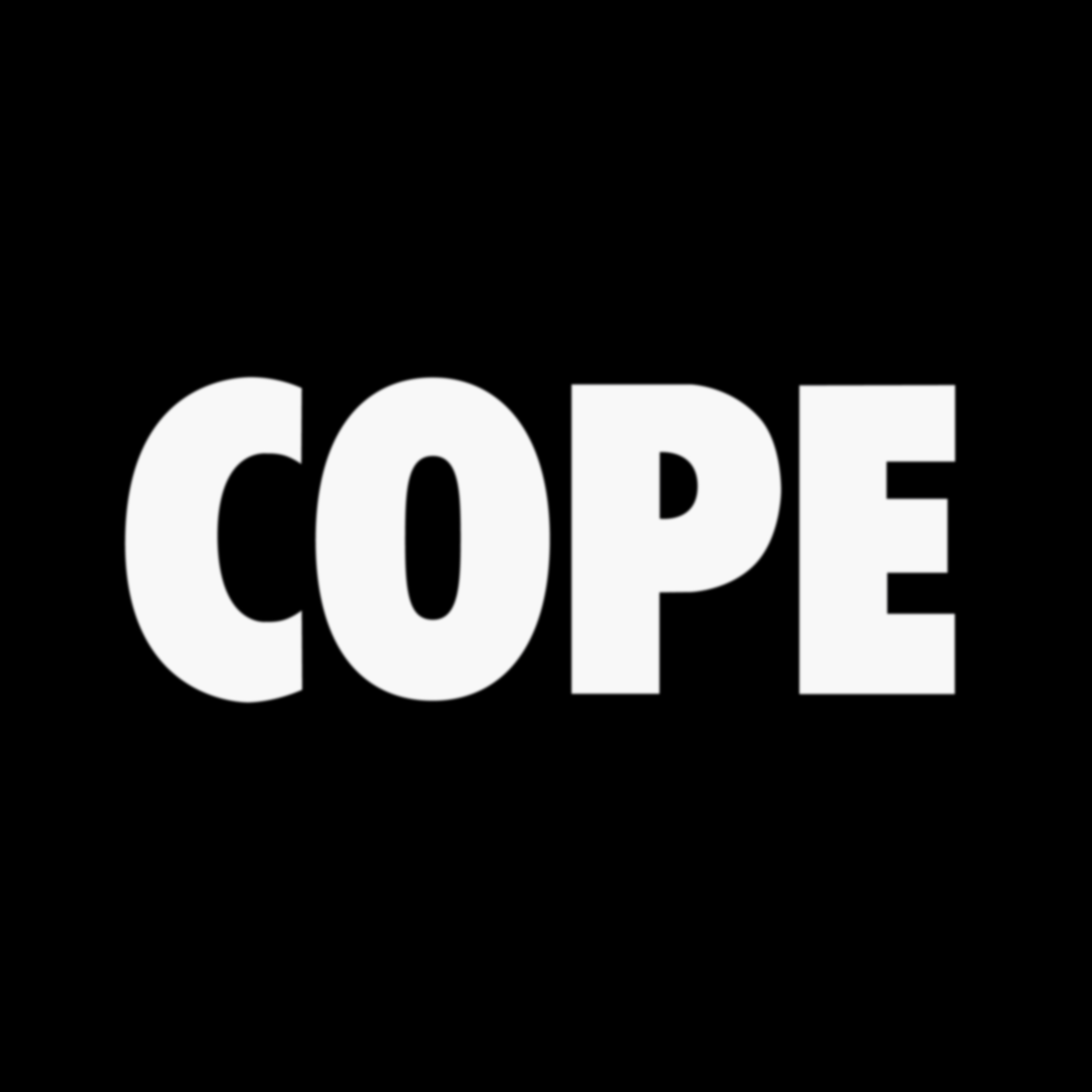

Studio album by Manchester Orchestra
- Released: April 1, 2014
- Recorded: June 2012 – March 2013
- Studios: Fluxivity Studios, Brooklyn, NY
- Genres: Indie rock; hard rock; post-hardcore; power pop
- Length: 38:04
- Labels: Loma Vista Recordings; Favorite Gentlemen
- Producers: Dan Hannon; Manchester Orchestra

Manchester Orchestra chronology
Simple Math (2011)	Cope (2014)	Hope (2014)

Singles from Cope
- 1. "Top Notch" Released: January 20, 2014; 2. "Every Stone" Released: March 4, 2014

Cope is the fourth studio album from Atlanta-based indie rock band Manchester Orchestra. It was released on April 1, 2014, through Loma Vista Recordings and the band's own independent label, Favorite Gentlemen. The album was self-produced alongside their long-time collaborating partner Dan Hannon, and mixed by John Agnello at Fluxivity Studios in Brooklyn. The album's first single, "Top Notch", was released on January 20, 2014. The album's second single, "Every Stone", was released on February 25, 2014.

== Recording ==
In the press release announcing the album's official title and release date, the band provided some further details about the album. It was revealed that Cope was recorded entirely in the band's recently completed home studio, and the album was described as an "unrelenting and unapologetically heavy 38 minutes of rock." Lead singer and songwriter Andy Hull went on to explain the tone of the album: "We wanted to make the kind of album that's missing at this time in rock: something that's just brutal and pounding you over the head every track [...] Whereas Simple Math was a different palate with each song, a different color, I wanted this to be black and red the whole time."

== Critical reception ==
Professional ratings
Aggregate scores
Source	Rating
AnyDecentMusic?	6.5/10
Metacritic	70/100
Review scores
Source	Rating
AllMusic	4/5 stars
Alternative Press	4/5 stars
American Songwriter	3/5 stars
Blurt	3/5 stars
NME	3.5/5 stars
Paste	7.9/10
Pitchfork	5.6/10
PopMatters	6/10
Rock Sound	7/10
Rolling Stone	3/5 stars

Cope mainly received positive feedback from critics upon release. At Metacritic, which assigns a normalized rating out of 100 to reviews from mainstream publications, the album received an average score of 70, based on 18 reviews, indicating 'generally positive reviews'. In a review for AllMusic, Matt Collar claimed that, "Manchester Orchestra's fourth studio effort, 2014's Cope, is a heavy, often dark, yet incredibly melodic album that finds the Atlanta outfit delving deep into its post-hardcore roots."

At Alternative Press, Brian Shultz rated the album four stars out of five, saying that the band are "appeared to be making the artist natural self-reaction statement when the promised their fourth full-length [...] would be 'brutal', 'pounding' and 'unapologetically heavy' rock record in contrast to the emotional and musical bell curve" of its predecessor, which this even "though appearing far more straightforward to the average listener, certainly delivers just that: it's the band's signature sound, only beefed up with massive choruses, heavy plowing and pleasing anguish". In addition, Shultz closes with "And though it unfortunately eschews the dynamic emotive crests and space of past efforts in favor of MO's intensely urgent intent, the results make it a completely worthy addition to an alt-rock catalog."

Miles Raymer of Entertainment Weekly stated that the album "combined indie rock melodicism with hard rock heft."

Rhian Daly of NME said the album veers from the "prettier, quieter moments" of Simple Math and "focuses instead on turbo-charged power-pop."

== Track listing ==
The album's track listing was announced on January 21, 2014, through the band's mailing list:

No.	Title	Length
1.	"Top Notch"	3:21
2.	"Choose You"	3:14
3.	"Girl Harbor"	3:22
4.	"The Mansion"	3:20
5.	"The Ocean"	3:19
6.	"Every Stone"	3:38
7.	"All That I Really Wanted"	3:02
8.	"Trees"	3:09
9.	"Indentions"	3:49
10.	"See It Again"	4:02
11.	"Cope"	3:48

iTunes bonus tracks
No.	Title	Length
12.	"Never Really Been Another Way Out"	3:06
13.	"After the Scripture"	4:34
