= Mean Everything to Nothing =

Album by Manchester Orchestra

Studio album by Manchester Orchestra
- Released: April 21, 2009
- Recorded: September–November 2008
- Genres: Indie rock; alternative rock
- Length: 53:23
- Label: Favorite Gentlemen
- Producers: Joe Chiccarelli; Dan Hannon

Manchester Orchestra chronology
I'm Like a Virgin Losing a Child (2006)	Mean Everything to Nothing (2009)	Simple Math (2011)

Mean Everything to Nothing is the second studio album by the Atlanta-based indie rock band Manchester Orchestra. It was released on April 21, 2009, through independent record label Favorite Gentlemen Recordings and produced by Joe Chiccarelli and Dan Hannon.

Prior to the album's release, AbsolutePunk premiered a video of "The Only One", while Spin premiered another one, for "Shake It Out", on March 24, 2009. A third video, for lead single "I've Got Friends", was released on April 7.

Mean Everything to Nothing received favorable reviews from music critics upon release and debuted at number thirty seven on the U.S. Billboard 200 and number eleven on the Billboard Rock Albums Chart.

== Reception ==
Professional ratings
Aggregate scores
Source	Rating
AnyDecentMusic?	6.2/10
Metacritic	73/100
Review scores
Source	Rating
AbsolutePunk	Highly Recommended
AllMusic	3/5 stars
Alternative Press	5/5 stars
Blare	4/4 stars
Kerrang!	4/5 stars
NME	(7/10)
Paste	(9.1/10)
Pitchfork	(5.2/10)
Punknews	4/5 stars
Sputnikmusic	4/5 stars

Mean Everything to Nothing was warmly received by critics. It currently holds an aggregated score of 70 on Metacritic, indicating "generally favourable reviews" based on 14 professional reviews and 8.2/10 based on 9 user votes.

Jason Tate, founder of AbsolutePunk.net highly recommended the album. He opened his review with the line, "Quick note to the rest of the albums coming out this year: The bar has just been set". He praised the album as "classic" and went on to add, "Between the crashing sounds, the subtle whispers, the vocal chants, and the emotional reaction – we have the makings of a classic. We have an album that clearly bridges the gap between mainstream and underground". Alternative Press reviewer Tim Karan awarded a maximum score of 5/5 and heaped praise on the album. He stated, "With 'Nothing, Manchester Orchestra have created what will ineveitably be regarded as one of the landmark releases of 2009, and more noticeable they've exceeded the hype that's surrounded them for nearly three years".

Chris Willman of Paste Magazine also lauded the album. Awarding a score of 91%, he commented that, "The young band has learned a great secret: It’s possible to make a massive, commercial, go-for-the-gusto Rock Record while still holding on to dark idiosyncrasies and seriousness of purpose". Punknews were also largely favourable in their review, rating the album at 4/5. They described the album as "Confoundingly consistent and vividly varied, Mean Everything to Nothing easily surpasses Manchester's previous output and provides a stark album of contrasting moods, layered fervor and modestly orchestral flow". They also commended Andy Hull for his maturing songwriting. "It remains an exciting and considerably accomplished effort. This only being the sophomore try and Hull barely drinking age, it's a little unnerving to think what they could even conceive later on".

Other positive reviews included British publications, Kerrang! and NME, who awarded scores of 4/5 and 7/10 respectively.

Some reviews were less favourable, particularly Pitchfork. Scoring the album at 5.2, Eric Harvey gave a mixed review. Both praising and criticizing Hull's lyrical themes. "For a kid barely able to legally drink, Hull's got the exhaustion of middle age. And that's the thing that both defines Manchester Orchestra at this point, as well as what stops them from being great. When they're satisfied with rocking the fuck out, they do it exceedingly well, but when they try to acquire the adult answers, they'd do well to chill out and enjoy being young".

Q Magazine were also more critical, awarding 2 stars out of 5. They bemoaned, "Their second album is suitably heavy on post-adolescent angst but, for all frontman Andy Hull's best efforts, singularly lacking its own voice.

=== Media appearances ===
"I Can Feel a Hot One" was used in an episode of the American television series Gossip Girl. "Shake It Out" was used as the theme song for the 2010 Impact Wrestling Pay-per-view Sacrifice.

== Track listings ==
All tracks are written by Andy Hull. Details taken from liner notes

No.	Title	Length
1.	"The Only One"	2:39
2.	"Shake It Out"	5:11
3.	"I've Got Friends"	4:57
4.	"Pride"	5:47
5.	"In My Teeth"	4:42
6.	"100 Dollars"	1:50
7.	"I Can Feel a Hot One"	4:19
8.	"My Friend Marcus"	3:41
9.	"Tony the Tiger"	3:09
10.	"Everything to Nothing"	5:37
11.	"The River" (contains hidden track "Jimmy, He Whispers" (Track ends at 5:55; hidden track begins at 7:25))	11:33

iTunes bonus track
No.	Title	Length
12.	"Go"	4:11

== Personnel ==
The following personnel contributed to Mean Everything to Nothing:

=== Manchester Orchestra ===
- Andy Hull – lead vocals, rhythm guitar, keys, lyrics
- Robert McDowell – lead guitar, vocals, keys
- Jonathan Corley – bass guitar, backing vocals
- Jeremiah Edmond – drums, percussion, art direction
- Chris Freeman – additional percussion, keys, backing vocals

=== Additional musicians ===
- Dan Hannon – electric guitar, keys
- Oliver Kraus – cello, violin
- Erica Froman – handclaps, vocals
- Mary Alice Hull – handclaps, vocals

=== Production ===
- Joe Chiccarelli – producer, mixing
- Dan Hannon – co-producer, engineering
- lane Johnson – Additional Vocal Engineering
- Ted Jensen – mastering
- Lowell Reynolds – assistant engineer
- Brad Fisher – assistant engineer
- Brian Manley – design layout, artwork, photography
- James Minchin – additional photography

== Fourteen Years of Excellence EP ==
Fourteen Years of Excellence

EP by Manchester Orchestra
- Released: April 18, 2009
- Genre: Indie rock
- Length: 17:24
- Labels: Favorite Gentlemen; Canvasback

Fourteen Years of Excellence is the fourth EP released by the band Manchester Orchestra, available on April 18, 2009 at select indie record stores as an exclusive release for Record Store Day. The limited edition EP came free with a purchase of Mean Everything to Nothing. Tracks 1 and 3 were done with Joe Chiccarelli while tracking Mean Everything to Nothing. Track 2 was done by Matt Mallpass and track 4 by Robert McDowell.

=== Track listing ===
No.	Title	Length
1.	"Anne Louise"	2:41
2.	"It's Okay With Me"	4:37
3.	"Do You Really Like Being Alone"	5:06
4.	"Shake It Out" (Alternate Version)	5:30
