= Manchester Orchestra =

American indie rock band

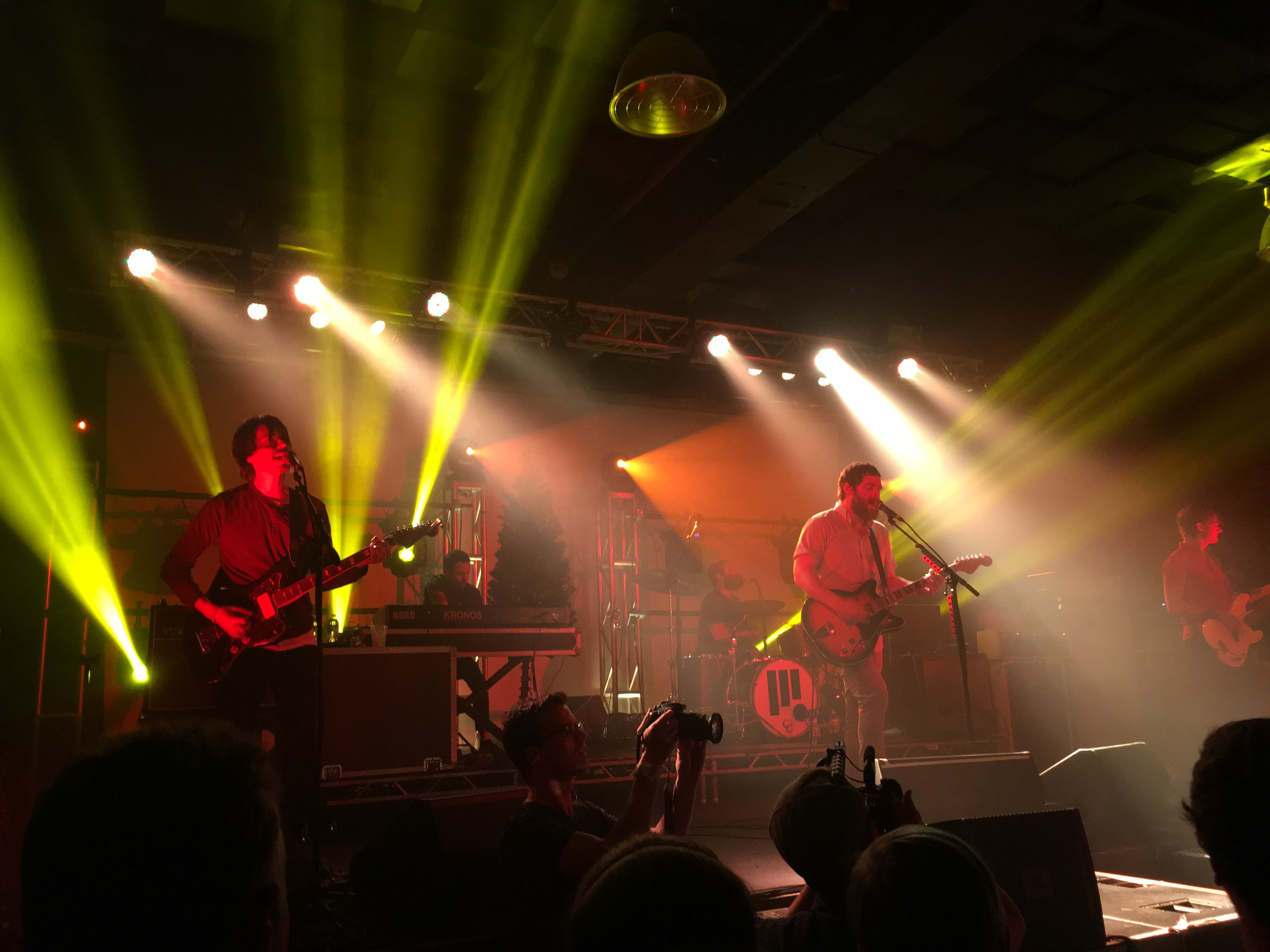
- Manchester Orchestra performing in 2017

Background information
- Origin: Atlanta, Georgia, U.S.
- Genres: Indie rock; alternative rock; post-hardcore; progressive rock; emo
- Years active: 2004–present
- Labels: Favorite Gentlemen; Sony; Loma Vista; Concord
- Members: Andy Hull; Robert McDowell; Andy Prince
- Past members: Jonathan Corley; Jeremiah Edmond; Trevor Dowdy; Chris Freeman; Andrew Maysilles; Garrett Brown; Benjamin Homola; Len Clark; Tim Very
- Website: manchesterorchestra.com

Manchester Orchestra is an American rock band from Atlanta, Georgia, which formed in 2004. The group's current line-up is composed of lead singer, songwriter and rhythm guitarist Andy Hull, lead guitarist Robert McDowell, and bassist Andy Prince. Hull is the band's only original member, having overseen every iteration of the band to date. Former drummer Jeremiah Edmond parted ways with the band in January 2010 to focus on his family and on running the band's record label, Favorite Gentlemen. The band's original bassist, Jonathan Corley, parted ways with the band in 2013. Keyboardist-percussionist Chris Freeman announced his departure from the band in September 2016. The group's most recent drummer, Tim Very, died in February 2026.

Manchester Orchestra has released several extended plays and six studio albums to date: I'm Like a Virgin Losing a Child (2006), Mean Everything to Nothing (2009), Simple Math (2011), Cope (2014) (as well as its accompanying acoustic version, Hope), A Black Mile to the Surface (2017), and The Million Masks of God (2021). The band put out their music through their own independent record label Favorite Gentlemen Recordings, which is distributed through Sony Music Entertainment and Loma Vista Recordings.

The band has performed at several major music festivals globally, such as Lollapalooza, Bonnaroo, Coachella, Riot Fest, Shaky Knees Music Festival, Firefly Music Festival, Reading and Leeds Festivals, and Austin City Limits Music Festival.

== History ==
=== 2004–2005: Early years ===
Manchester Orchestra originated in the Atlanta suburbs. They are named after the English city of Manchester, a city frequently viewed as being bohemian and also rich in musical history. In an interview with Caught in the Crossfire, lead singer Andy Hull explained that he chose "Manchester" because he "had gone through a summer of listening to nothing but The Smiths", and "Orchestra" because he "didn't want to be in a band" and envisioned having "all [his] friends come and be a part of it and form an orchestra". Feeling increasingly alienated at his "small-town-Georgia, Christian high school" named Providence Christian Academy, in suburban Atlanta, Hull became so frustrated that he spent his senior year studying at home. He also wrote and recorded his first full-length album in 2004 while studying during his last year of high school.

Early in their career, the band recorded an album entitled Nobody Sings Anymore. However, it was never released due to the shift in the band's musical direction and personnel changes undergone following its recording. The band stated that "the band that made the record was different to the band now." Some of the tracks written for the album were released instead on their 2005 EP You Brainstorm, I Brainstorm, but Brilliance Needs a Good Editor.

=== 2006–2008: I'm Like a Virgin Losing a Child ===
Following the release of You Brainstorm..., Manchester Orchestra recorded and released their debut album I'm Like a Virgin Losing a Child. The album was released on July 27, 2007. Guitarist Robert McDowell did not appear on this album, having left the band at the time of recording. He did, however, rejoin the band a year later. The song "Wolves at Night" was featured in the video game NHL 08. The band worked in the studio recording their third EP, Let My Pride Be What's Left Behind, with producer Dan Hannon and engineer Brad Fisher. It was released October 7, 2008.

On February 13, 2008, a Daytrotter Sessions set was published including three songs the band performed live.

=== 2008–2010: Mean Everything to Nothing ===
In early September 2008, the band announced on their Myspace blog that they had begun recording their second album entitled Mean Everything to Nothing with producer Joe Chicarrelli (The Shins, My Morning Jacket). On February 4, 2009, the band posted a link to a free download of the single "I've Got Friends" and performed an acoustic version at The Fly's in the Courtyard Sessions. The album was released April 21, 2009 and peaked at No. 37 on the US Billboard 200 albums chart.

Jeremiah Edmond left the band in January 2010 to focus on his family and running the band's record label. Also in January, the band announced the release of a split EP with Kevin Devine entitled I Could Be the Only One. The EP was released digitally January 26, 2010. Following the release of the Manchester Orchestra / Kevin Devine split EP, it was announced that Devine would record a full-length album along with the members of Manchester Orchestra later that year, with half the album written by Devine and half by Andy Hull. On April 10, 2010, it was announced the new project's name as Bad Books and that the album would be released under that moniker. On August 16, 2010, it was announced that the self-titled Bad Books album would be released on October 19, 2010, digitally and on November 9, 2010, on a physical CD.

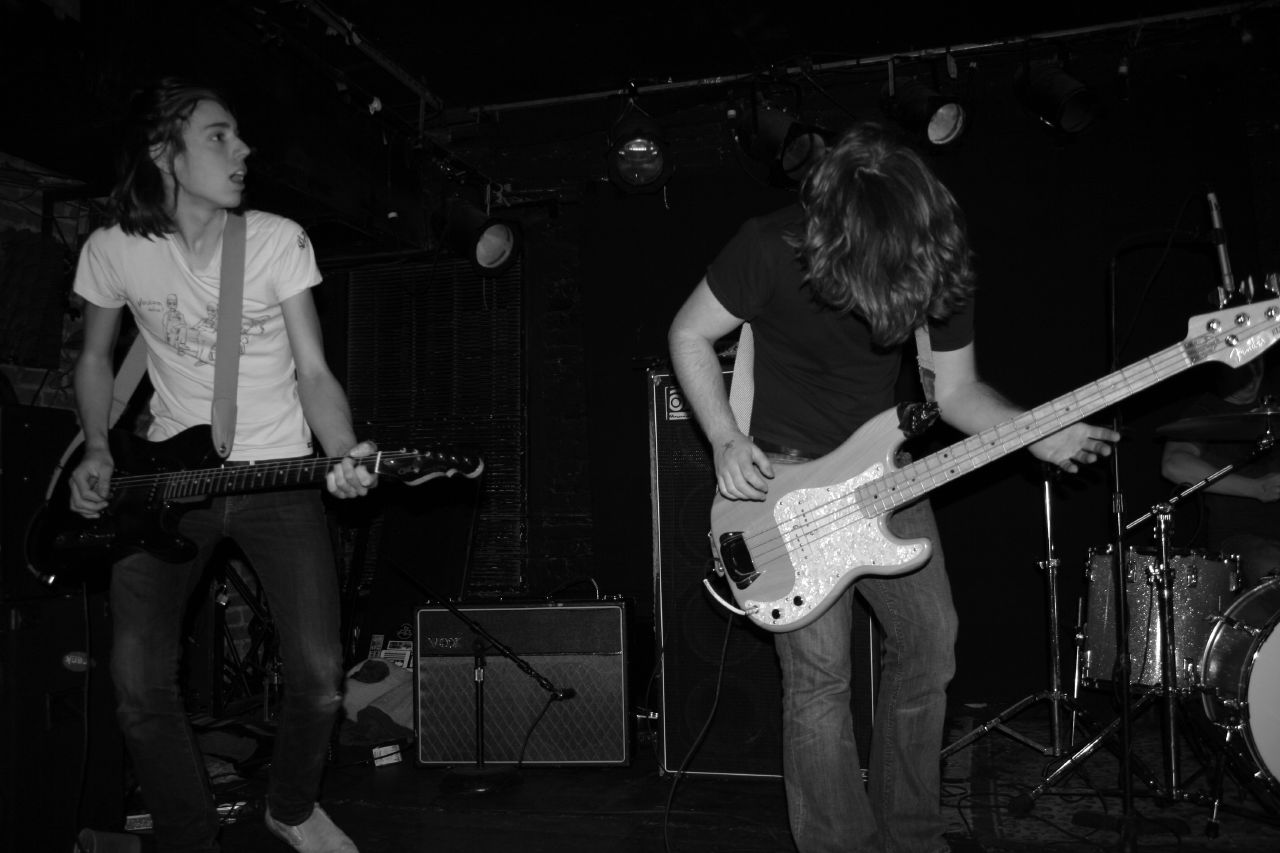
Robert McDowell and Jonathan Corley of Manchester Orchestra performing live

=== 2010–2012: Simple Math ===
In March 2010, Hull mentioned in an interview with the Dallas Observer that the band had begun work on a follow-up to 2009's Mean Everything to Nothing, tentatively titled Let Go of Your Sorrowful Groaning. (While ultimately discarded as an album title, this phrase later appeared on the song "Mighty".) He also said that the band had been demoing around 34 songs, and that in writing the album he was imagining a "spiritual miscarriage". In September 2010, in an interview with Rip It Up magazine, the band announced that they were in the middle of recording their third full-length album, and explained it to be completely different from anything they had released in the past. The album was recorded with Dan Hannon in both Blackbird Studio (Nashville) and their own Favorite Gentlemen Studios (Atlanta). Drummer Tim Very, who previously played in Waking Ashland, is featured on the album and eventually became Edmond's replacement. On October 23, 2010, during an appearance at Radio 104.5 in Philadelphia, following a Bad Books show in support of their recently released self-titled debut album, Manchester Orchestra debuted an acoustic version of the new album's title track, "Simple Math". Frontman Andy Hull said the album would be released in March 2011. On January 27, 2011, the band announced that their third full-length studio album, Simple Math, would be released on May 10, 2011. It was also revealed that Simple Math would be a concept album. The song "April Fool" was featured in the game NHL 12. In the summer of 2011, the band joined Blink-182 and My Chemical Romance for part of the 2011 Honda Civic Tour. In autumn 2011, the band headlined the PacTour and were supported by White Denim, The Dear Hunter and Little Hurricane.

=== 2013–2015: Cope and Hope ===
On February 10, 2013, Jonathan Corley left the band to pursue a career outside of playing music and was replaced by Andy Prince. On March 11, the band announced they had begun recording their fourth full-length album. For Record Store Day 2013, the band teamed up with Grouplove and Frightened Rabbit to release a 12-inch containing the tracks "Make It to Me" and "Architect". On October 28, 2013, the band released their first new music since 2011, "After the Scripture", a song featured on the soundtrack of the movie Dallas Buyers Club.

On December 8, 2013, Andy Hull announced in a video interview with Matt Pinfield that their fourth studio album would be titled Cope, and was slated for release on April 1, 2014. On January 21, 2014, an official statement from the band confirmed this information. The album's first single, "Top Notch", was released alongside the announcement. Pre-orders for CD and LP copies of the album were subsequently added to the band's online store. On February 25, 2014, the album's second single, "Every Stone", was released. On September 16, 2014, Manchester Orchestra surprise-released Hope, a song-by-song re-imagining of Cope with stripped down and more emotionally driven versions of each song. On Hope, Andy Hull stated that the band "aimed for nasty and guttural stuff on Cope, and this was more like, 'How pretty can this be?' I've always liked both sensibilities. This was an opportunity to see if we could sit down and do it for a whole album." They also announced a 13-date tour in support of Hope.

=== 2016: Swiss Army Man ===
Andy Hull and Robert McDowell wrote and performed the soundtrack for Swiss Army Man, a 2016 film starring Daniel Radcliffe and Paul Dano. The soundtrack is composed solely of vocals, with as many as 150 vocal tracks layered on top of one another. Radcliffe offered high praise for the soundtrack:

Do you know what I honestly think should be nominated [for an Academy Award?] The soundtrack and the songwriting from the band – Andy and Rob from the band Manchester Orchestra. Obviously, I'm totally biased but I really think that when people hear the "Montage" song that we sing in the movie – I don't feel that there's going to be a better original song all year than the one those guys wrote.

— Daniel Radcliffe, Entertainment Weekly

The soundtrack was nominated for "Best Original Score for a Comedy Film" and "Film Music Composition of the Year" in the 2016 International Film Music Critics Association Awards.

=== 2017–2021: A Black Mile to the Surface ===
The band released their fifth full-length album, A Black Mile to the Surface, on July 21, 2017. The album debuted at No. 7 on the Billboard Top Albums Sales chart, No. 2 on Vinyl Albums, No. 6 on Alternative Albums, and No. 7 on Rock Albums. The album was produced by Catherine Marks, John Congleton, and Jonathan Wilson. The band put out three singles ahead of the album's release. "The Gold" was released June 9, with an accompanying music video by Mike Dempsey and Johnny Chew. Two weeks later, the band released "The Alien". It featured a music video, released on NPR and created by Mike Dempsey and the Daniels. On July 10, 2017, they released the third and final single from the album, entitled "The Moth". On July 31, the band released a music video for "The Sunshine", which was directed by the Daniels.

On March 30, 2018, the band released a cover of "No Hard Feelings" by The Avett Brothers. On June 8, 2018, they released the single "I Know How to Speak", which was partially recorded during the Black Mile sessions.

=== 2021–present: The Million Masks of God and Very's death ===
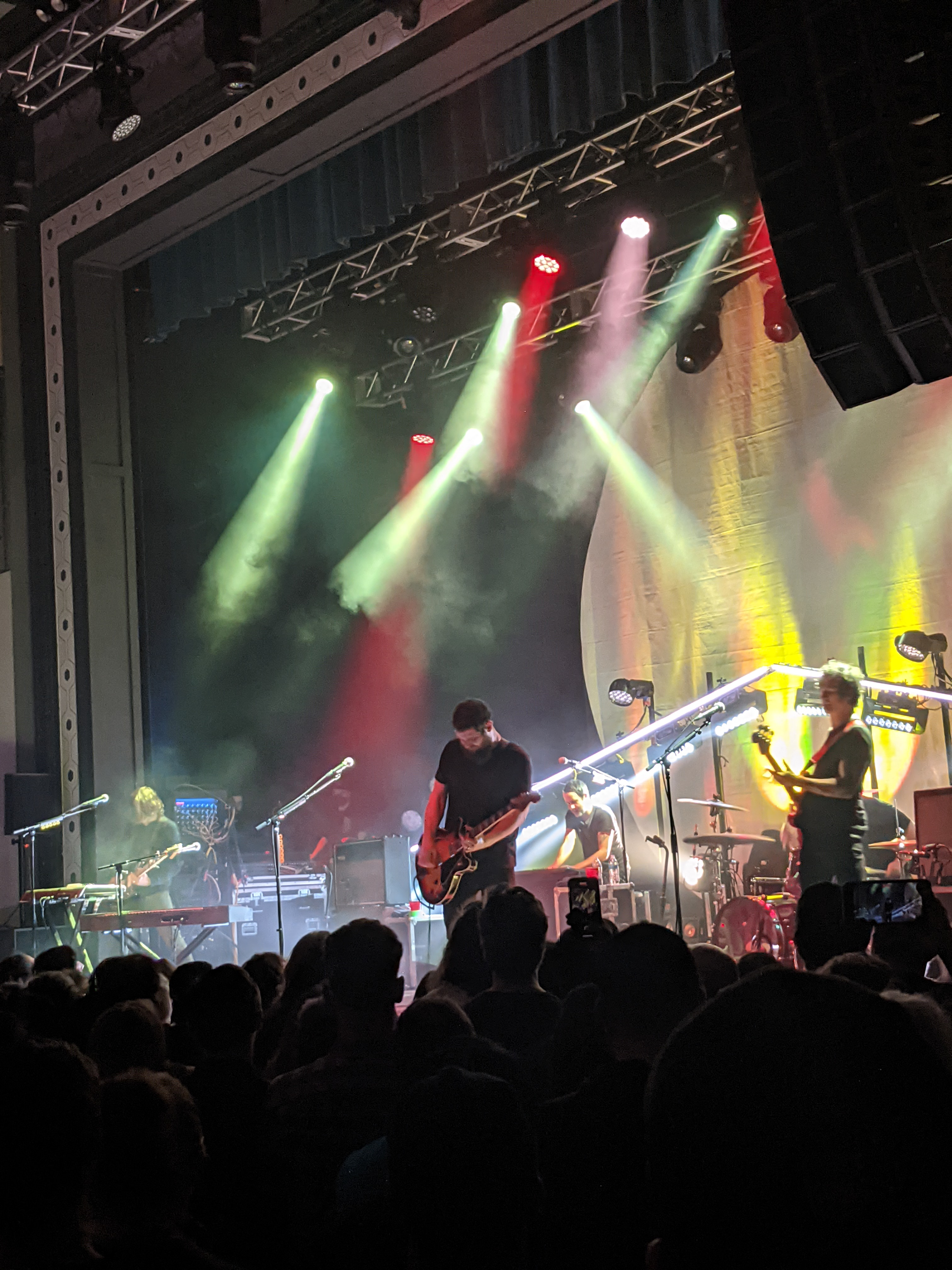
Manchester Orchestra performing at the Roxian Theatre in Pittsburgh, Pennsylvania, in March 2022

On February 17, 2021, the band announced their sixth album, The Million Masks of God, by releasing the first single from the album, "Bed Head". The album was released on April 30 via Loma Vista.

In April 2022, the band joined Michigander for a feature on their single "In My Head" and brought them out on their headlining tour in support of The Million Masks of God, alongside Foxing.

On March 10, 2023, the band released The Valley of Vision, a six-song album accompanied by a VR film released on YouTube. It features tracks recorded during The Million Masks of God sessions.

Drummer Tim Very died in February 2026, at the age of 42. At the time, the band had recently completed recording for their seventh studio album. In an open letter shared in May 2026, Hull confirmed that the album would eventually be released: "Our brother would be so angry if we didn’t finish this album and release it for the world to hear," he wrote. "He was just so deeply proud of this album, and for good reason." That same month, the band shared their live album Union Chapel (London, England), recorded at the titular venue and featuring stripped-back versions of Manchester Orchestra songs as performed by Hull and Robert McDowell in duo mode. In October 2026, the band released a re-recorded version of their debut album, I'm Like a Virgin Losing a Child, to commemorate its 20th anniversary.

== Appearances in media ==
=== Television performances ===
Series title	Date
Late Show with David Letterman	September 6, 2007
Late Night with Conan O'Brien	October 31, 2007
Late Show with David Letterman	April 29, 2009
Late Night with Jimmy Fallon	June 10, 2009
Live from Abbey Road	
Jimmy Kimmel Live!	March 10, 2010
Late Show with David Letterman	May 12, 2011
Last Call with Carson Daly	November 2, 2011
Late Show with David Letterman	March 31, 2014
CBS This Morning	July 22, 2017

=== Movies ===
Movie	Year	Song
No Sleep 'Til Christmas	2018	"The Maze"
Swiss Army Man	2016	Full score
Earth to Echo	2014	"Opposite Sides"
Premium Rush	2012	"Pensacola"

=== Video games ===
- NHL 08 featured "Wolves at Night"
- NHL 12 featured "April Fool"
- MLB 11: The Show and Dirt 3 both featured "I've Got Friends"
- The Sims 3: World Adventures featured "I've Got Friends" in the Simlish version
- Fortnite featured "Bed Head" on the car radio station.

=== Podcasts ===
- Comedy Bang! Bang! – July 31, 2017
- Comedy Bang! Bang! – May 2, 2021
- Improv4humans – September 9, 2021
- Comedy Bang! Bang! – July 30, 2023

=== Relationship with All Elite Wrestling ===
On at least three occasions, the group's songs have been featured by the American professional wrestling organization All Elite Wrestling (AEW):

- "Pride" was used in an opening video package for All In Texas in July 2025.
- After Sting retired from professional wrestling, "The Silence" was featured in his tribute video.
- Upon the passing of Benjamin "Pac" Satterley, "I Know How to Speak" was featured in his tribute video that was played at the end of the A Tribute to Pac episode of AEW Dynamite on September 30, 2026.

== Band members ==
Current members

- Andy Hull – lead vocals, rhythm guitar, piano (2004–present), keyboards (2005–2007)
- Robert McDowell – lead guitar, keyboards, backing vocals (2005–2007, 2008–present)
- Andy Prince – bass guitar (2013–present)

Current touring musicians

- Brooks Tipton – keyboards, piano (2017–present)

Former members

- Andrew Maysilles – drums, percussion (2004–2005)
- Garrett Brown – lead guitar (2004–2005)
- Jonathan Corley – bass guitar (2004–2013)
- Chris Freeman – keyboards, additional drums, percussion, backing vocals (2006–2016)
- Trevor Dowdy – lead guitar, keyboards (2007–2008)
- Jeremiah Edmond – drums, percussion (2005–2009)
- Benjamin Homola – drums, percussion (2010)
- Len Clark – drums, percussion (2011)
- Tim Very – drums, percussion, backing vocals (2011–2026; died 2026)

== Discography ==
- I'm Like a Virgin Losing a Child (2006)
- Mean Everything to Nothing (2009)
- Simple Math (2011)
- Cope (2014)
- A Black Mile to the Surface (2017)
- The Million Masks of God (2021)

== Podcasts ==
Manchester Orchestra has consistently released a series of video podcasts throughout their career. Over one hundred podcasts have been released since September 2006 on the band's YouTube page. They begin during the recording process of the band's first record I'm Like a Virgin Losing a Child, and continue to highlight key moments of the band's progression. These 5- to 10-minute videos were released as a way to connect with fans and to give them a glimpse of what it's actually like touring and making records. These videos were filmed and edited by filmmaker and founding band member Jonathan Corley. The numbering of these podcasts reflect different time periods, and reset for each additional record release.

== Related musical projects ==
Several of the members of Manchester Orchestra are involved in other music projects. Andy Hull has a solo project called Right Away, Great Captain! as well as a band called Bad Books consisting of Hull and Kevin Devine. Robert McDowell's solo project is called Gobotron. In addition to Manchester Orchestra, Andy Prince plays bass for Kevin Devine and Nashville-based band The Gills.

== The Stuffing ==
The band hosts, curates, and performs at an annual festival in Atlanta called "The Stuffing". The festival began in 2010 and takes place every year around Thanksgiving. In addition to Manchester Orchestra, past performers include Cage the Elephant, Kevin Devine, O'Brother, The Front Bottoms, All Get Out, Grouplove, Dustin Kensrue and more. 2016 was the 7th year of The Stuffing and featured Manchester Orchestra performing their album I'm Like a Virgin Losing a Child in its entirety to celebrate the album's 10-year anniversary.
