= Gobotron =

American indie rock project

- Origin: Atlanta, Georgia, United States
- Genres: Indie rock; pop rock
- Years active: 2008–present
- Label: Favorite Gentlemen Recordings
- Members: Robert McDowell
- Website: Official Myspace

Gobotron is the solo side project of Manchester Orchestra's lead guitarist and backing vocalist, Charles Robert "Robot" McDowell. His debut album On Your Mark, Get Set... was released on January 19, 2010, through Manchester Orchestra's own label Favorite Gentlemen Recordings.

== History ==
Upon returning from Manchester Orchestra's 2008 headlining tour in the summer of 2008, Robert McDowell has decided to start working on his own solo material in his parents' house in Atlanta, Georgia. He was anxious to move into a new direction and create something different than the music he had made working with the band.

McDowell decided to call his solo project by the name Gobotron. The Gobotron moniker comes from the initial nickname “Robot” given to McDowell years ago as a play on words with Robert, that evolved into Robo, Robo Cop, Robotron, Robby Robot, Rorby, Gorby, Gorbatraz and many more before ultimately and finally graduating into Gobotron. The album title is inspired from a dream he had after watching The Simpsons one night. "I was falling asleep, drifting in and out. The episode mixed in with one of my dreams and made me think of the title. I woke up laughing and wrote it down. It's nothing deep, it just made sense for the album title."

McDowell wrote, played and recorded a whole album worth of material during the summer of 2008, before Manchester Orchestra was going into another short tour and pre-production for their next album, which has become 2009's critically successful Mean Everything to Nothing. Of the album's sound, McDowell has said he was influenced by artists ranging from Ben Kweller to Brian Wilson, and features mostly a pop rock sound. Since he had no time to keep working on his own material due to the Manchester Orchestra schedule, he delayed the project until the summer of 2009, when his album was finally mixed and mastered, a whole year after being recorded.

The debut album, entitled On Your Mark, Get Set... was finally released on January 19, 2010, through Manchester Orchestra's label, Favorite Gentlemen Recordings.

Robert McDowell (as Gobotron) made his debut live solo appearance in October 2010, as a supporting act touring with Bad Books, a supergroup he is also a part of, on their 4 date East Coast promotional tour for their self-titled debut album. He has also supported Kevin Devine and Andy Hull on their acoustic five date tour in December 2010, which was also in support of the Bad Books debut album, though neither McDowell nor the full band joined Devine and Hull on these dates.

On June 10, 2016 the second album, "Transform" was released on bandcamp.

== Discography ==
- On Your Mark, Get Set... (2010)
- Transform (2016)
