= Between the Concrete and Clouds =

Between the Concrete & Clouds

Studio album by Kevin Devine
- Released: September 13, 2011
- Length: 39:13
- Label: Razor & Tie; Favorite Gentlemen; Big Scary Monsters
- Producer: Chris Bracco

Kevin Devine chronology
She Stayed as Steam (2010)	Between the Concrete & Clouds (2011)	Bulldozer (2013)

Professional ratings
Review scores
Source	Rating
AllMusic	3.5/5 stars
NME	(8/10)
Rockfreaks.net	(7.5/10)
Under the Gun Review	8/10

Between the Concrete & Clouds is the sixth studio album by American indie rock musician Kevin Devine. It was his first album since 2009, released via Razor & Tie / Favorite Gentlemen.

It is the first record of Devine's made that is fully backed by a band – Kevin Devine & the Goddamn Band, consisting of keyboardist Brian Bonz, bassist/keyboardist Chris Bracco, drummer/percussionist Mike Fadem, guitarist Russell Smith, and guitarist/mandolinist Mike Strandberg – and his fourth produced by Bracco, who previously co-produced Devine's Make the Clocks Move and Split the Country, Split the Street with Mike Skinner and produced 2009's Brother's Blood. The album was mixed by Rob Schnapf, who produced Devine's 2006 album Put Your Ghost to Rest and the 2008 single "Another Bag of Bones". Per Devine, "the combination of Chris and Rob on this record kind of marries the best aspects of everything I've tried to do over the past ten years."

The UK CD of the album, released via Big Scary Monsters, features 2 bonus tracks, "Part of the Whole" and "Luxembourg", Devine's previous two singles (produced by Schnapf) released prior to Between the Concrete & Clouds.

== Track listing ==
1. "Off-Screen" – 4:17
2. "The First Hit" – 3:24
3. "Sleepwalking Through My Life" – 3:22
4. "Awake in the Dirt" – 3:07
5. "Between the Concrete & Clouds" – 4:05
6. "11-17" – 4:25
7. "Wait Out the Wreck" – 2:01
8. "A Story, A Sneak" – 4:52
9. "The City Has Left You Alone" – 3:47
10. "I Used to Be Someone" – 5:53
