= Bad Books =

American indie rock band

- Origin: Atlanta, Georgia; Brooklyn, New York, United States
- Genres: Indie rock; indie folk
- Years active: 2010–present
- Labels: Triple Crown; Favorite Gentlemen; Sony Music
- Members: Kevin Devine; Andy Hull; Robert McDowell; Chris Freeman; Benjamin Homola
- Past members: Jonathan Corley
- Website: triplecrownrecords.com/artists/bad-books/

Bad Books is an American indie rock band formed in early 2010, and is composed of indie folk artist Kevin Devine and members of indie rock band Manchester Orchestra along with drummer Benjamin Homola. The collaboration began when Kevin toured along with Manchester Orchestra in November–December 2008 in support of his EP I Could Be with Anyone, and followed by the release of the split EP entitled I Could Be the Only One in January 2010.

A self-titled full-length album by the band was released digitally on October 19, 2010, and on a physical CD on November 9, 2010. A second album, simply entitled II, followed two years later, on October 9, 2012.

== History ==
Bad Books started as a collaboration between folk/indie singer-songwriter Kevin Devine and Manchester Orchestra's Andy Hull. Devine has toured with Manchester Orchestra since signing with their label Favorite Gentlemen in 2007, and the two had a spot supporting Brand New on their US spring tour in March– April 2007. Hull and Devine met again when they were co-headlining a tour in the US in November–December 2008, in support of Devine's EP I Could Be with Anyone which featured songs from his then-upcoming fifth studio album Brother's Blood.

Devine and Hull then started writing songs on the road when they met again, as Devine supported Manchester Orchestra on their UK tour in July 2009, supporting their release Mean Everything to Nothing. The two then continued to work together, and on January 26, 2010, they released together the split EP I Could Be the Only One digitally. They planned on pressing a 7" vinyl, but that was delayed indefinitely. The EP featured Kevin Devine covering the Manchester Orchestra song "The Only One", while Manchester Orchestra covered the Kevin Devine song "I Could Be with Anyone", both doing very different and unique renditions to the known songs.

Following the release of the split EP, in an AbsolutePunk interview with Andy Hull in January 2010, it was announced that Kevin Devine and Manchester Orchestra are set to release a full-length album together, collaborating on 8 tracks with Kevin Devine writing four, and Andy Hull writing the other four.

On April 10, 2010, Alternative Press revealed that the Kevin Devine/Manchester Orchestra collaboration album would be released under the new band name, Bad Books, and that it would contain 10 songs and not 8 as was stated previously by Kevin.

On August 16, 2010, the band set an October 19, 2010, release date for their self-titled debut album. The band also revealed 4 east coast tour dates in support of the new release, including stops at New York City, Philadelphia, Baltimore, and Cambridge between October 20–24, 2010. All dates were supported by Andy Hull's solo side project Right Away, Great Captain, Robert McDowell's solo side project Gobotron, and Dead Confederate's Hardy Morris.

On August 25, 2010, the album's artwork and track list were revealed on the band's official website. The official track list is different than that previously given to Alternative Press, which was composed of working titles. The album's artwork was designed by band member Chris Freeman and Brian Manley. The same day, the band has also offered a free download of a song called "You Wouldn't Have to Ask" on their official website. It was the first song to be released by the new project. Later that day, the band uploaded another new song called "Please Move" for free listening on their Facebook page. The physical CD release of the album was announced for November 9, 2010.

On October 8, 2010, it was announced that Kevin Devine and Andy Hull will embark on a short 5 date joint acoustic tour in December 2010, playing mostly Bad Books songs, as well as solo songs and Manchester Orchestra songs. The tour is also in support of the band's self-titled debut release, although the two frontmen won't be joined by the full band.

On October 20, 2010, the band streamed a live acoustic performance on their website.

On November 8, 2010, Bad Books released the music video for the official first single "You Wouldn't Have to Ask", on the Spin.com website. The video, which was shot in black and white, was directed by Jason Miller and is based on the Everly Brothers' 1964 performance of the song "Gone, Gone, Gone" on the musical variety series Shindig!. On November 30, 2010, the music video was made available for purchase on iTunes.

On November 10, 2010, the band announced two new tour dates in support of the album, the band's first dates playing the west coast.

On January 11, 2011, the band released a free MP3 download of their cover of Built to Spill's "The Plan" on their official website, a song that has been a part of all of their live shows. The version released is a live recording from one of the band's first shows in October 2010, and it was released along with an accompanying live video as well, professionally shot by ApK Media. On April 16, 2011, Manchester Orchestra released the live recording of "The Plan" (credited to Manchester Orchestra feat. Kevin Devine) as the b-side to the Record Store Day 2011 exclusive 7" single of their song "Simple Math."

II was released on October 9, 2012, through Triple Crown Records. The band also premiered the song "Forest Whitaker" off their second album, on the Rolling Stone's website.

"Forest Whitaker" was also featured on hit comedy How I Met Your Mother in episode 13 of season 9 entitled Bass Player Wanted.

On October 4, 2013, the band performed a Daytrotter Session at Strobe Recording in Chicago, Illinois. The session was later given a vinyl pressing of 1000 copies and was sold at shows during Andy Hull and Kevin Devine's solo tour along the west coast. The pressing then later went up for sale online on June 14.

On March 11, 2019 they announced the release of their third album on social media. Simply titled III, the album dropped on digital platforms on June 14, 2019 and in stores on June 21, 2019.

On October 9, 2023, a reimagining of their second album II was announced with the release of the split single The After Party / It Never Stops. It is slated for a full release on October 20, 2023.

== Band members ==
- Kevin Devine – lead vocals, guitar, piano (2010–present)
- Andy Hull – lead vocals, guitar, piano (2010–present)
- Robert McDowell – lead guitar, backing vocals (2010–present)

== Discography ==
=== Albums ===
- 2010: Bad Books
- 2012: II
- 2016: Daytrotter Session
- 2019: III
- 2023: II: Revisited
