= I Am a Nightmare =

Single by Brand New
- Released: May 17, 2016
- Genre: Alternative rock; indie rock; pop punk
- Length: 3:20
- Label: Procrastinate! Music Traitors
- Songwriter: Jesse Lacey
- Producer: Mike Sapone

Brand New singles chronology
"Mene" (2015)	"I Am a Nightmare" (2016)

"I Am a Nightmare" is a single by American rock band Brand New, released on 17 May 2016. The song was released as a digital download, with a 12-inch single made available to preorder online. The single has been described by the band as being from their "upcoming release", with Lacey previously commenting in 2015 that he was unsure what format the new material would be delivered in. Pitchfork Media awarded it Best New Track, praising Lacey for writing his most instantaneous hook in over a decade, whilst proclaiming that when the band announce their fifth album it would "break the internet".

== Background ==
Frontman Jesse Lacey had previously commented to various media outlets that recording their previous record Daisy, the band felt as though they had reached "the end of the road" musically, and that their next record would likely involve backtracking and looking for another route they could have possibly taken. Before releasing new material the band also looked to develop the infrastructure around them, building their own Black Site Studio, as well as expanding their record label, Procrastinate Music Traitors. After releasing an older track "Mene" in 2015, the band discussed that whilst "Mene" did not entirely represent their new material, they had been writing more melodic and catchy music, with Lacey keen to avoid repeating the more exhausting and complicated songwriting formulas found on their previous album, Daisy.

== Release ==
On 17 May 2016, a number of music news outlets reported that Brand New would be releasing a new track on 20 May 2016, with a 30-second sample made available through Amazon.com. The band's longtime collaborator and producer, Mike Sapone also teased the track through his Instagram page. Later on 17 May the song was made available, with the band and their label Procrastinate Music Traitors announcing that the single was available to stream and download immediately, with a 12-inch vinyl single available to preorder, with an expected release date of June 2016.

The track was debuted live at Vogue Theatre in Vancouver on 1 June 2016, the first night of their Canadian tour.

On August 12, 2016, the track reached #1 in the United Kingdom Official Vinyl Singles Chart, with previous single "Mene" taking the #2 position.

== Packaging ==
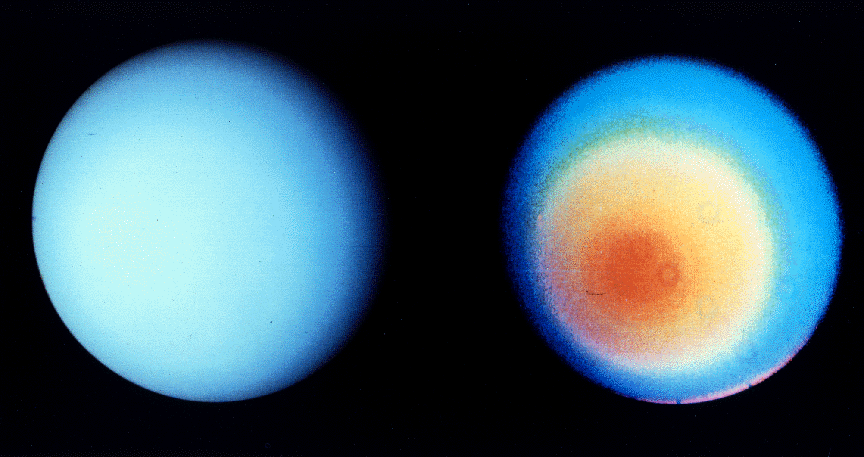
The circular sticker on the cover is a photograph of the planet Uranus, taken by the Voyager 2 space probe.

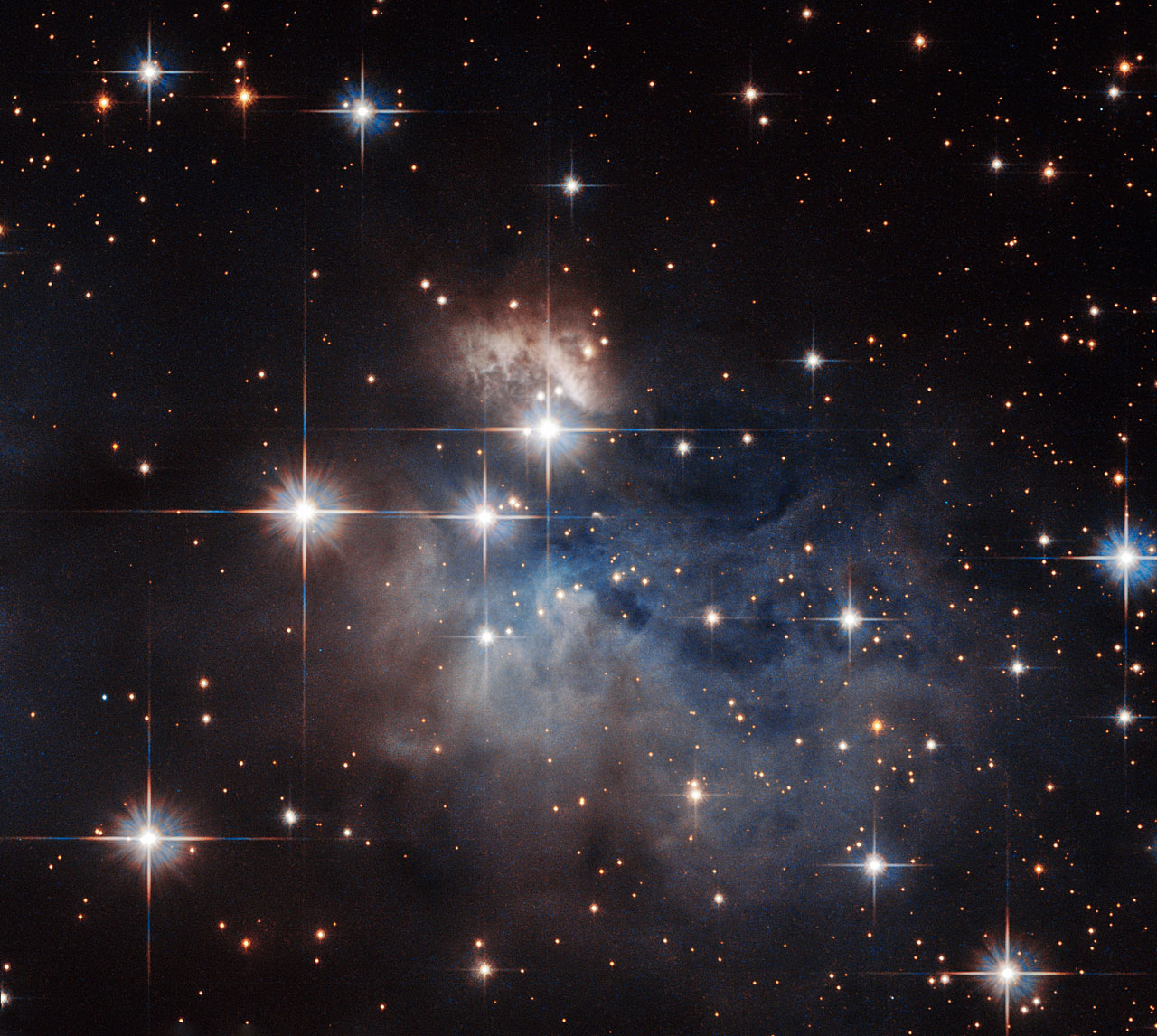
The sticker of Uranus is peeled away to reveal an image of IRAS 12196-6300, taken by the Hubble Space Telescope.

The artwork and packaging were created by Morning Breath Inc., who previously contributed towards the packaging of Daisy and The Devil and God Are Raging Inside Me. The 12-inch black record features the song's lyrics etched into the b-side. A circular sticker of gradient rainbow color exists upon the front cover which appears to be a false-color image of Uranus, which when peeled away reveals an image of the emission-line star known as IRAS 12196-6300.

== Personnel ==
Brand New

- Jesse Lacey - vocals, guitar, production
- Vincent Accardi - vocals, guitar, production
- Garrett Tierney - bass, production
- Brian Lane - drums, percussion, production

Production

- Mike Sapone - production
- Vince Ratti - mixing

== Charts ==
Chart (2012)	Peak position
UK Official Vinyl Singles Chart (Official Charts Company)	1
