= Live at Looney Tunes (Kevin Devine album) =

Live album by Kevin Devine
- Released: April 18, 2009
- Genre: Indie rock, alternative rock

Kevin Devine chronology
I Could Be With Anyone (2008)	Live at Looney Tunes (2009)	Brother's Blood (2009)

Live at Looney Tunes is a live CD of Kevin Devine's in-store performance at Looney Tunes CDs in Long Island, NY on April 18, 2009. The CD (and performance itself) was a special Looney Tunes exclusive for Record Store Day 2009. It was given away for free to those who purchased Brother's Blood from the store.

The CD was recorded and released on the same day, being printed on CD-Rs with "Kevin" hand-written on them. The track list is not printed on the CD.

The show was performed in a semi-acoustic fashion with no drummer.

On December 29, 2014, the performance was released on vinyl through Looney Tunes's own Brookevale Records and Enjoy The Ride Records (the two previously repressed Kevin's debut album, Circle Gets the Square, in 2012). The release, limited to 500, featured new artwork on a hand number gatefold jacket, remastered audio and a digital download code. The 500 copies were split across three variants: 200 copies on sky blue, red & bone color split with leaf green splatter exclusive to the Enjoy The Ride Records webstore, 200 copies on bone with ginger splatter exclusive to the Brookvale Records webstore and 100 copies on black vinyl split between the two webstores.

== Track listing ==
1. Intro
2. Tomorrow's Just Too Late
3. Yr Husband
4. You're Trailing Yourself / Carnival
5. Another Bag of Bones
6. Go Haunt Someone Else
7. Cotton Crush
8. I Could Be With Anyone
9. The Biggest Lie
10. Lord, I Know We Don't Talk

"Another Bag of Bones" features an introduction with lyrics from "Democracy" by Leonard Cohen.
"The Biggest Lie" is an Elliott Smith cover. It appears on Smith's self-titled album.
