= Leaked Demos 2006 =

Album by Brand New

Demo album by Brand New
- Released: January 24, 2006 (leaked), December 2, 2015 (officially released)
- Recorded: 2005
- Genres: Alternative rock; emo; indie rock; post-hardcore
- Length: 40:00
- Label: Procrastinate! Music Traitors
- Producers: Mike Sapone; Brand New

Brand New chronology
Daisy (2009)	Leaked Demos 2006 (2006)	Science Fiction (2017)

Leaked Demos 2006 (sometimes referred to by fans as Fight Off Your Demons) is a collection of previously unreleased recordings by American rock band Brand New. The recordings originally leaked on January 24, 2006 before eventually being officially released on cassette tape nearly ten years later on December 2, 2015. On January 12, 2016, the songs were made available as a pay what you want digital download.

Upon their initial leak in 2006, the tracks were untitled, leading them to be simply referred to by their track listing number. Over the following year, four of the tracks were released, "Yeah (Sowing Season)" and "Luca" were reworked and rerecorded for The Devil and God Are Raging Inside Me, "Fork and Knife" was rerecorded and reworked as a standalone single whilst "Brother's Song" was released as a B-side entitled "Brothers" and also reworked into another B-side entitled "aloC-acoC". Over the years, official titles were gradually revealed via setlists for the remaining tracks, before the final track listing was announced in 2015.

== Background ==
In an interview in January 2004, Lacey revealed that he had "written a few songs for the next album" and that instead of writing solely on an acoustic guitar he had been influenced by bands such as Radiohead and U2 to try experimenting with other instruments. Over the winter of 2004, the band was "holed up in a house" where they continued writing and recording, and in January 2005, photographer Alexa Lambros posted a number of photographs from the sessions onto her website to much fanfare. With "10 or 11 songs" recorded for the next album the band decided to take a break. Due to Lacey undergoing surgery in early 2005, the band pursuing personal projects, and a number of deaths within the families of each of the band's members, it wasn't until around June 2005 that Brand New reconvened to continue working together. The band found that the material they were now writing sounded entirely different from the material they had previously recorded in the winter of 2004 for the album, and with the exception of a track known as "...YEAH" they decided to scrap the previous session in favor of a clean start.

Over the following months, the band worked in Mike Sapone's basement arranging and demoing tracks before moving to Oxford, Mississippi in September 2005 to work with producer Dennis Herring. Due to time constraints the band had to abandon the sessions with Herring, returning to working with Sapone. Whilst in a hotel in Los Angeles, the band's primary songwriter Lacey wrote five tracks in an evening of songwriting, two of which were the tracks "Brother's Song" and "Good Man".

"It had me pretty down for a while. No one likes to show their creation in mid-process, and those songs weren't done. They were like blueprints. Just the plan, right? It put me in a state where I was under the impression that those songs had been wasted or something—that we had to go and write new things because those had been heard. Now, in retrospect, I want those songs to be on the album and many of them aren't, and I'm probably more to blame for that than anyone. This record already feels incomplete to me without those tracks and probably will forever."

— Jesse Lacey discussing the initial leak

On January 24, 2006, nine unfinished recordings from the 2005 sessions were leaked onto the internet by an unknown source. The leak drew mixed reactions from the band. Lacey was unhappy, mainly due to the fact the songs were heard prior to being finished, believing the songs to be "wasted" and that the band couldn't use them on their third album, whilst bassist Garrett Tierney saw it in a more positive light as "so many people were curious to hear what we have been doing". After scrapping much of the leaked material, the band recommenced writing and recording and would eventually release their album The Devil and God Are Raging Inside Me on November 20, 2006.

Over the following years the band would discuss the possibility of both rerecording or releasing the leaked recordings on a number of occasions.

== Recording and production ==
The original leak was part of a "larger collection of songs" that were in various stages of production. Some of the recordings solely featured Lacey performing on an acoustic guitar, whilst others were full band arrangements. For the first official release in 2015, the songs underwent audio restoration, with the band releasing superior quality versions to the original leak. The 2015 cassette tape contains an alternate recording of the track "Nobody Moves", different to the original leak and its remaster found in the digital download.

== Music and influence ==
The opening track "Good Man" was written by Lacey about being "in love when you're young and out of it when you're old". Lacey described the song as being about a girl that had liked him since first grade; not realizing he had a school sweetheart until years later when he was 27. For the third track "Brother's Song", Lacey had been influenced by the writing style of his friend Kevin Devine and looked to try writing about current world events. The track deals with Lacey's fear that one of his brothers would have to go to war, remarking that neither he or his family would "let it happen." Lacey later joked at a performance in Santa Ana, California on December 10, 2013 that one of his brothers had "screwed the whole thing up" after joining the United States Navy. The fourth track "Missing You" was written by Lacey about his grandfather, a year after his death.

The original lyrics for "Yeah (Sowing Season)" have been described by Lacey as being about "losing it all and figuring out how to get it all back." Elaborating on the track, Lacey revealed the track was written about members of his family going off to fight in World War II, specifically his Great Uncle, Leo Lacey. Jesse Lacey revealed that his Great Uncle Leo was an American soldier on a transport ship that was heading for Japan during the Pacific War. After the Atomic bombings of Hiroshima and Nagasaki the transport he was on returned to America, which led Jesse Lacey to consider the duality of both something great happening in his Great Uncle not being deployed whilst "something completely awful [was] happening."

== Release ==
The recordings first leaked on the internet on January 24, 2006, circulating on various peer-to-peer services and file hosting sites. Following the leak four of the tracks would go on to either be reworked or released. Two of the songs were reworked and became tracks on the finished record, The Devil and God Are Raging Inside Me. "Yeah (Sowing Season)" (originally leaked as "Untitled 08") would be reworked into the album's opening song "Sowing Season", whilst "Luca" (originally leaked as "Untitled 06") would also be reworked, appearing as the eighth track on the album, whilst the original version appeared as a bonus track on some editions of the album as a "reprisal version."

"Brother's Song" (originally leaked as "Untitled #3") was reworked and rerecorded into a track titled "aloC-acoC" for the "Sowing Season" single, which was released on November 21, 2006, whilst the original version was released under the title "Brothers" on the "Jesus" single on April 30, 2007. On October 23, 2007 the band released "Fork and Knife" (originally leaked as "Untitled 07") as a standalone digital single. The song was rerecorded with slightly reworked lyrics and a new bridge section during the sessions for the band's The Devil and God are Raging Inside Me album.

In April 2015 it was reported that the band had sent out lyric booklets for their album The Devil and God are Raging Inside Me as part of an unfulfilled offer made nine years previously. Within the booklet, titled Pogolith 000 was a poster alluding to the release of the 2005 session. The band's vocalist and guitarist, Jesse Lacey further discussed how the recordings would "soon" be released in an interview with Spanish magazine Rockzone in July 2015. Lacey likened them to an "abandoned child", stating that the fact fans were still enjoying the recordings helped the band rescue them.

On November 20, 2015, exactly nine years since the release of The Devil and God Are Raging Inside Me a number of news outlets reported that Leaked Demos 2006 would be released in December 2015 through the band's own record label, Procrastinate! Music Traitors on limited edition cassette tape. On December 2 the cassettes were made available to purchase exclusively through the Procrastinate! Music Traitors online store, and without any fanfare or announcements from the band the cassettes sold out within the day. The second batch of the cassettes were made available on January 12, 2016. On the same day the songs were also made available as a pay what you want digital download through the Procrastinate! Music Traitors store, as well as being added to music streaming services.

== Packaging ==
The first physical pressing of the songs released on December 2, 2015 was on a red cassette tape. The J-card on the first pressing features five different photographs as well as a thank you note from the band. The front cover is partially made up by an iconic production still from the 1974 film The Texas Chain Saw Massacre which depicts Gunnar Hansen's character Leatherface wielding a chainsaw. A picture of a person surfing in the sea also features on the front cover, whilst the photographs of two skulls, two nude women walking, and a photograph of a shark by Pat Bonish complete the card. The retail version released in January 2016 was pressed on black cassette tape. The J-Card is identical with the exception of the front cover, which features a still from the 1973 Spanish horror film Sexy Cat, in the place of the still used from The Texas Chain Saw Massacre from the first pressing.

== Performances ==
Though several were reworked and either featured on The Devil and God Are Raging Inside Me, released as standalone singles, or included as part of the 3 Demos, Reworked EP, all songs have been performed live in some capacity.

- "Fork & Knife" made its live debut on June 20, 2006 at Starland Ballroom, Sayreville, New Jersey and wouldn't be performed again until December 10, 2013 at The Observatory, Santa Ana, California, this time including the bridge added for the single version in 2007.
- "Good Man" was often played by Lacey as a solo performance for the band throughout the years, and possibly made its live debut on November 14, 2006 at Earshot Records in Greenville, South Carolina as part of an acoustic in-store set. An extended version was debuted on March 2, 2025 during Lacey's first public performance in eight years, at the Eastside Bowl in Nashville, Tennessee.
- "Nobody Moves" debuted live on May 24, 2007 at the Webster Theater, Hartford, Connecticut.
- During his solo tour in August 2007 and July 2008, Lacey would often perform "Brother's Song", "Good Man" and a hybrid version of both the reworked and original lyrics of "Sowing Season", although the latter was only performed during the August 2007 tour. "Brother's Song" would also be included in the band's setlists at least twice in 2008; it would later be reworked with a full band arrangement for various shows from 2013 onwards.
- "Missing You" was revealed as the song title for "Untitled 04" when it was debuted live for the first time on October 4, 2014 at The National Theater in Richmond, Virginia.
- "1996" made its live debut on July 19, 2016 at MidFlorida Credit Union Amphitheatre, Tampa, Florida, and was played multiple times that year.
- "Battalions" was played during soundchecks throughout the band's 2025 reunion tour.

== Track listing ==
All songs written by Brand New.

No.	Title	Lyrics	Length
1.	"Good Man"		1:59
2.	"1996"		4:57
3.	"Brother's Song"		3:46
4.	"Missing You"		4:56
5.	"Nobody Moves"		6:58
6.	"Luca"		4:10
7.	"Fork and Knife"	Accardi/Lacey	2:57
8.	"Yeah (Sowing Season)"		5:01
9.	"Battalions"		5:34

== Personnel ==
Brand New

- Jesse Lacey – vocals, guitar, lyrics
- Vinnie Accardi – guitar, backing vocals, lyrics
- Garrett Tierney – bass guitar
- Brian Lane – drums, percussion
- Derrick Sherman – rhythm guitar, keyboards, backing vocals
