= Science Fiction (Brand New album) =

Studio album by Brand New
- Released: August 17, 2017
- Studios: Sonic Ranch (Texas); Dark Horse Recording (Tennessee); Dreamland Recording (New York); Sapone Productions (New York); Black Site Studio (New York)
- Genres: Indie rock; alternative rock; emo; post-hardcore; experimental rock
- Length: 61:22
- Label: Procrastinate! Music Traitors
- Producer: Mike Sapone

Brand New chronology
| Leaked Demos 2006 (2015) | Science Fiction (2017) |

Brand New studio chronology
| Daisy (2009) | Science Fiction (2017) |

Science Fiction is the fifth studio album by American rock band Brand New, released on August 17, 2017 through Procrastinate! Music Traitors, the band's own label. It was the band's first album in eight years, following Daisy in 2009.

A fifth Brand New album was originally scheduled for release in 2016 before the band announced in September that it was not ready to be finalized. During the recording process for Science Fiction, the band also repeatedly communicated an imminent disbanding in 2018. The album was surprise-released on August 17, 2017, with its title and track listing previously unknown, after 500 untitled CDs were sent to fans who had pre-ordered the fifth album on vinyl.

It was both a critical and commercial success. Science Fiction received universal acclaim from music publications for befittingly concluding Brand New's influential career. It also debuted at number one on the United States Billboard 200 albums chart, the band's first to top the list.

== Background ==
Following the release of their fourth studio album, Daisy, in 2009, Brand New took time away from writing new music. In July 2014, the band confirmed that they had entered the studio to begin the recording process for the new album. However, they did not officially release any new material until a single entitled "Mene" in 2015, a song originally written for The Devil and God Are Raging Inside Me. Another new song, "Sealed to Me", was also premiered in concert. This was later followed by the release of another single, "I Am a Nightmare", in 2016. Additionally, the band officially released the batch of leaked demos from the Devil and God recording session, as well as an EP consisting of three of those demos reworked.

During that time period, Brand New hinted several times through concerts and merchandise that the band would be breaking up in 2018. The band initially prepared to release their fifth album in 2016; however, they postponed the release on September 16, 2016 after expressing dissatisfaction with the final product.

First an apology. At some point previous, we, Brand New admitted our plans to release a record this year. These plans were authentic, but we are changing them. While there exists a collection songs that, right now, some would call fit to be an album, to us it is not complete enough, refined enough, or edited thoroughly enough to be something we would call finished or essential. Brand New will not release a record in 2016.

— Brand New

As with Daisy, the lyrics on the album were divided among both Accardi and Lacey.

Per the liner notes, proceeds from the album were donated to charities including Whitman-Walker Health, the National Organization for Women and the Southern Poverty Law Center.

== Content ==
Album opener "Lit Me Up" begins with what Billboard described as a "dated, documentary-style spoken exchange of someone’s dream analysis." Spin believed the song's meaning "explores trauma’s permanence through a naturalistic lens, all geothermic vents and abyssal seas."

During the band's performance at Boston's Wang Theatre on October 20, 2017, Lacey revealed that "Same Logic/Teeth" was written by guitarist Vincent Accardi. Lacey also named it his favorite Brand New song. The song drew multiple comparisons to Modest Mouse. At Chicago's Aragon Ballroom, Lacey said that Accardi wrote the song in 2005.

"137" contains lyrics about nuclear warfare, specifically referencing the bombing of Nagasaki during World War II. The title refers to Caesium-137, the "byproduct of decaying radioactive uranium".

On "Out of Mana", Brand New "envisions life as a video game, with death acting as the final boss", featuring lines such as "Oh praise player one, infinite lives, the time will come up." It is concluded with a short outro that Drowned in Sound labeled a "haunting, romantic... fragile sketch."

"In the Water" was musically compared to the "graceful love child of Red House Painters and Built to Spill" and contains lyrics believed by Spin to be "Brand New meta-commentary ... a self-flagellatory portrait of the artist calling himself out on his own bullshit." The outro features a "fourth-wall-breaking retrospective of the band’s discography" by repeating the spoken-word intro to Brand New's previous album, Daisy (2009) as well as an audio sample of a man repeating the words "seven years" ten times, which has been interpreted as a lyrical callback to the song "Limousine".

"Desert" was described by Steven Hyden as "a first-person narrative about a far-right, homophobic militant". Spin noted how it criticized "Christian hypocrisy". The music of "451" was recurrently compared to Depeche Mode.

The album's final song, "Batter Up", is about "facing up to ambivalence". Pitchfork wrote that the song's guitar work evoked "turning into white ash, like 'Jesus Christ' given a Disintegration Loops treatment." The album ends with swelling feedback before an unidentified voice emerges to say "It's what we're waiting for." NPR Music described it as "a perfect coda".

== Release and promotion ==
On August 15, 2017, Brand New updated the website for their record label, Procrastinate! Music Traitors, allowing for pre-orders of a confirmed fifth album to be shipped in October on vinyl format in a limited quantity. A tour of the Eastern United States and the UK was announced as well.

On August 17, a CD containing one 61-minute long track was shipped to people who had pre-ordered the limited edition vinyl, with each CD numbered out of 500. The track, entitled "44.5902N104.7146W" (coordinates to the Devils Tower National Monument in Wyoming, also known as the setting for the 1977 sci-fi film Close Encounters of the Third Kind) came with a booklet including quotes from the Poole versus HAL 9000 chess match scene in the 1968 sci-fi film 2001: A Space Odyssey. The track was livestreamed by a fan through a Facebook group, where the album title Science Fiction, artwork, and certain track titles such as "No Control", "Desert", "Out of Mana", "In the Water" and "451", were revealed using the music identification app Shazam. Later that day, the band made the album available for pre-order in vinyl, CD and digital download formats for release in October. The physical edition of the album was released on October 20, 2017. Vinyl pre-orders, including white and blue and red variants, were delayed due to pressing issues with the record label Procrastinate! Music Traitors.

The track "Can't Get It Out" was promoted to alternative radio stations and listed as the "Artist's Pick" on Spotify. It earned airplay from stations including Los Angeles' KROQ.

== Artwork ==
The cover is based around a photograph by Swedish artist Thobias Fäldt. The photograph features two women, Malin and Emma, seemingly jumping from a balcony. The packaging for the release has been created by Brooklyn based studio Morning Breath, Inc., who also worked on the artwork for Daisy and "Mene". The deluxe edition of the vinyl record came with a zine that included a poem.

== Critical reception ==
Professional ratings
Aggregate scores
| Source | Rating |
|---|---|
| AnyDecentMusic? | 8.5/10 |
| Metacritic | 88/100 |
Review scores
| Source | Rating |
| AllMusic | 4/5 stars |
| The A.V. Club | B+ |
| Classic Rock | 4/5 stars |
| Consequence of Sound | A− |
| Drowned in Sound | 8/10 |
| Exclaim! | 7/10 |
| The Line of Best Fit | 9/10 |
| Pitchfork | 8.3/10 |
| Q | 4/5 stars |
| The Skinny | 4/5 stars |

At Metacritic, which assigns a normalized rating out of 100 to reviews from mainstream critics, the album received an average score of 88, indicating "universal acclaim".

Awarding the album a "Best New Music" designation, Pitchfork's Ian Cohen praised Science Fiction as "a wise and vulnerable conclusion for a rock band who were crucial in shaping a scene, a sound, and many emotions." "Same Logic/Teeth" was awarded "Best New Track". Zoe Camp of Spin called it a "nostalgia-steeped, emotionally draining record" which makes for "a worthy (if bittersweet) send-off to one of the most brutally honest, forward-thinking rock bands of the new millennium." Michelle Geslani of Consequence of Sound noted familiar themes of "morality, truth and authenticity, religion as an institution, and mental health issues", while concluding that "on Science Fiction Lacey sounds more resigned to his fate than ever before." Chris Payne of Billboard felt that the album establishes Brand New as "part of a lineage of constantly-shape-shifting, steadfastly fascinating experimental rock bands." In Uproxx, Steven Hyden labeled Science Fiction as the "emo Abbey Road", while Emma Garland of Vice called it "a fitting ending" to the band's career. Hyden and NPR Music both noted the Pink Floyd influence found on the album.

Sputnikmusic stated that Science Fiction "obliterates already unreasonably high expectations while forming one of the best and most anticipated curtain-calls in recent memory."

=== Accolades ===
| Publication | Accolade | Rank | Ref. |
|---|---|---|---|
| Louder Than War | Top 100 Albums of 2017 | 83 | |
| Pitchfork | Reader's Poll: Top 50 Albums | 17 | |
| Pitchfork | Reader's Poll: Most Underrated Album | 5 | |
| Sputnikmusic | Staff's Top 50 Albums of 2017 | 11 | |
| Sputnikmusic | Top 100 Albums of the 2010s | 31 | |
| The Daily Beast | 10 Best Albums of 2017 | 8 | |

== Commercial performance ==
Science Fiction debuted at number one on the US Billboard 200 in the issue dated September 9, 2017, with 58,000 album-equivalent units. Of that tally, the album sold 55,000 traditional album copies. Science Fiction marked the first number one album of Brand New's career, topping their previous high of Daisy's number six debut in 2009. Additionally, it became the first independently released album to top the charts since Frank Ocean's Blonde in 2016. The fourteen-year gap between Brand New's first charting album, Deja Entendu in 2003, and their first number one album in 2017, is the longest since David Bowie's 43-year gap from 1973 to 2016. Science Fiction also debuted at number one on Billboard's Independent Albums chart. It was also the first independently-released album to reach number one in 2017.

In its second week, Science Fiction fell to No. 97, setting a new record for the steepest fall from number one in the history of the Billboard 200 chart. By the next week, the album fell off the chart completely; with two weeks, Science Fiction was the shortest lasting number one album in Billboard history. However, the album re-entered at No. 50 in October after its physical release.

== Live shows ==
Brand New's live shows in support of Science Fiction were also critically acclaimed; Billboard deemed it a "must-see for the uninitiated" and praised how "Brand New indulged in an effects-laden stage show the likes of which you’d expect from a critically-adored, mid-level pop star exploring their Björk influence." The band expanded to a six-piece for performances, with the addition of Kevin Devine as an additional touring guitarist and the return of Benjamin Homola as a second live drummer.

The band debuted material from the album live on September 9, 2017 at the High and Low Fest in San Bernardino, California, which Brand New headlined alongside Death Cab for Cutie. Alex G opened for Brand New at The Warfield in San Francisco; all other non-festival dates were opened by Nada Surf. The band sold out several dates minutes after tickets went on sale, including in New York, Chicago, Philadelphia and Boston. Their hometown show at Kings Theatre in Brooklyn was reported to have last-minute resale tickets upwards of $100 and fans lining up at the 6:30 p.m. doors time to purchase a limited edition venue-exclusive poster.

The show opened with the band hidden behind what Spin described as "a massive, cage-like metal fence of LCD lights, similar to one Nine Inch Nails have used in years past". Album opener "Lit Me Up" began their sets, followed by "Gasoline". During the guitar solo in the third song, "Out of Mana", the screen lifted to fully reveal the band. Consequence of Sound felt it was "a technological leap" for Brand New and "far and away the most visual set" in their live history. Smoke effects and dissipating flames on the fence synced with the music to "Lit Me Up" even as the band was fully obscured. After the band's reveal, the background screen was also utilized to display images of found war footage during "137" and cloud lightning during "In the Water".

Brand New notably did not play much material from their first two albums, skipping popular single "The Quiet Things That No One Ever Knows" (which Billboard theorized was because they "appeared generally disinterested in vocal harmonies") and performing only "Soco Amaretto Lime" from debut Your Favorite Weapon as an acoustic encore.

== Track listing ==
All music written by Brand New. Lyrics written by Accardi and Lacey.

| No. | Title | Length |
|---|---|---|
| 1. | "Lit Me Up" | 6:17 |
| 2. | "Can't Get It Out" | 3:43 |
| 3. | "Waste" | 4:36 |
| 4. | "Could Never Be Heaven" | 3:16 |
| 5. | "Same Logic/Teeth" | 5:34 |
| 6. | "137" | 5:02 |
| 7. | "Out of Mana" | 5:15 |
| 8. | "In the Water" | 6:52 |
| 9. | "Desert" | 3:37 |
| 10. | "No Control" | 3:55 |
| 11. | "451" | 4:53 |
| 12. | "Batter Up" | 8:28 |
| Total length: | | 61:22 |

Note: The initial track listing was one long track entitled "44.5902N104.7146W", which are the approximate coordinates for Devils Tower.

== Personnel ==
Credits adapted from the liner notes of Science Fiction.

Brand New

- Jesse Lacey – vocals, rhythm guitar
- Vincent Accardi – lead guitar, vocals
- Garrett Tierney – bass, vocals
- Brian Lane – drums

Production

- Mike Sapone – producer, audio engineer, mixer
- Vince Ratti – mixing
- Mike Sapone – mixing ("Same Logic/Teeth")
- Charles Godrey – audio engineer
- Steve Kupillas – audio engineer
- Claudius Mittendorfer – audio engineer
- Gerardo "Jerry" Ordonez – audio engineer
- Brett Romnes – audio engineer
- Joe Cannetti – assistant audio engineer
- Zachary Casper – assistant audio engineer
- Amanda Giacomo – assistant audio engineer
- Nathan Kiner – assistant audio engineer
- Mario Ramirez – assistant audio engineer
- Emily Lazar – mastering
- Chris Allgood – mastering assistant

Additional Performances by:

- Michael Gagliardi – horns on track 5
- Andrew Accardi – synthesizer on track 6
- Frank LaTorre – harmonica on track 8
- Mike DiMeo – hammond organ on track 8
- Santino Sapone – ambient synthesizer apparatus

== Charts ==
=== Weekly charts ===
| Chart (2017) | Peak position |
|---|---|
| Australian Albums (ARIA) | 6 |
| Canadian Albums (Billboard) | 59 |
| New Zealand Heatseekers Albums (RMNZ) | 10 |
| Scottish Albums (Official Charts) | 47 |
| UK Albums (Official Charts) | 72 |
| US Billboard 200 | 1 |
| US Independent Albums (Billboard) | 1 |
| US Top Alternative Albums (Billboard) | 1 |
| US Top Rock Albums (Billboard) | 1 |

=== Year-end charts ===
| Chart (2017) | Position |
|---|---|
| US Top Rock Albums (Billboard) | 57 |

== Release history ==
| Region | Date | Format(s) | Label(s) | Ref. |
|---|---|---|---|---|
| United Kingdom | August 17, 2017 | Digital download | Procrastinate! Music Traitors | |
| Australia | August 18, 2017 | Digital download | Procrastinate! Music Traitors | |
| New Zealand | August 18, 2017 | Digital download | Procrastinate! Music Traitors | |
| Canada | August 19, 2017 | Digital download | Procrastinate! Music Traitors | |
| United States | August 19, 2017 | Digital download | Procrastinate! Music Traitors | |
| United States | October 20, 2017 | CD; LP | Procrastinate! Music Traitors | |

== See also ==
- List of Billboard 200 number-one albums of 2017
