= Live at Looney Tunes =

Live at Looney Tunes may refer to:

- Live at Looney Tunes (From Autumn to Ashes album)
- Live at Looney Tunes (Kevin Devine album)
