= Travelling the EU =

EP by Kevin Devine
- Released: February 24, 2003
- Genre: Indie rock
- Label: Defiance Records

Kevin Devine chronology
Circle Gets the Square (2002)	Travelling the EU (2003)	Make the Clocks Move (2003)

Travelling the EU is a European EP released by Kevin Devine. It was initially released in 2003 through Defiance Records as a limited CD and 7", and later became available through digital retailers. Both physical versions are now out of print. The EP features early versions of the songs "Haircut" and "Probably", which were later featured on Devine's third album Split the Country, Split the Street (2005). The version of "Probably" featured on this EP was also released on the Beer: The Movie soundtrack.

== Track listing ==
1. "Haircut"
2. "You Are My Sunshine"
3. "Probably"
