= Bad Books (album) =

Studio album by Bad Books
- Released: October 19, 2010
- Recorded: April – May 2010
- Studio: Favorite Gentlemen Studios, Atlanta, Georgia
- Genre: Folk rock, indie rock, alternative rock
- Length: 35:34
- Label: Favorite Gentlemen, Razor & Tie
- Producer: Robert McDowell

Bad Books chronology
Bad Books (2010)	II (2012)

Singles from Bad Books
- 1. "You Wouldn't Have to Ask" Released: November 8, 2010

Professional ratings
Review scores
Source	Rating
The Marshalltown Chronicle	4.5/5 stars
Lost In The Sound	68%
BLARE Magazine	3.5/5 stars

Bad Books is the debut album by Bad Books, a folk and indie rock collaboration project by Kevin Devine and members of Manchester Orchestra, notably Andy Hull. It was released digitally on October 19, 2010, with a physical CD release following on November 9, 2010 through Manchester Orchestra's own label Favorite Gentlemen Recordings. Six songs on the album were written by Devine, with the other five written by Hull.

The album was recorded at Manchester Orchestra's own studio by band member Robert McDowell. The album's artwork was designed by band member Chris Freeman and Brian Manley.

On August 25, 2010, "You Wouldn't Have to Ask" was offered as a free download on the band's official website. Later that day, "Please Move" was offered for free listening on the band's Facebook page. The band made the full album available for streaming on MySpace on October 15, 2010.

The band supported the release of the album with a short four-date east coast tour in October 2010, with supporting acts Right Away, Great Captain, Gobotron, and Hardello. Another acoustic five-date tour by Devine and Hull alone took place in December 2010, in support of the release, with supporting act Gobotron.

On November 8, 2010, Bad Books released the music video for the official first single "You Wouldn't Have to Ask", on the Spin.com website. The video, which was shot in black and white, was directed by Jason Miller and is based on the Everly Brothers' 1964 Shindig! performance of the song "Gone, Gone, Gone". On November 30, 2010, the music video was made available for purchase on iTunes.

== Track listing ==
No.	Title	Writer(s)	Length
1.	"How This All Ends"	Andy Hull	3:03
2.	"The Easy Mark & the Old Maid"	Kevin Devine	3:37
3.	"Baby Shoes"	Andy Hull	3:50
4.	"You're a Mirror I Cannot Avoid"	Kevin Devine	3:53
5.	"Holding Down the Laughter"	Kevin Devine	4:04
6.	"You Wouldn't Have to Ask"	Kevin Devine	1:52
7.	"I Begged You Everything"	Andy Hull	4:50
8.	"Please Move"	Andy Hull	3:02
9.	"Mesa, AZ"	Kevin Devine	3:23
10.	"Texas"	Andy Hull	4:00
11.	"Thanklin Franklin (Fish Ass Baby)" (Pre-order bonus track)	Kevin Devine	3:05

== Personnel ==
- Kevin Devine - lead vocals, guitar, piano
- Andy Hull - lead vocals, guitar, piano
- Robert McDowell - lead guitar, backing vocals
- Chris Freeman - keyboards, backing vocals
- Jonathan Corley - bass
- Ben Homola - drums, percussion
