= Jesus Christ (Brand New song) =

2007 single by Brand New

Single by Brand New

from the album The Devil and God Are Raging Inside Me
- B-side: "Brothers"
- Released: March 26, 2007
- Genre: Emo
- Length: 5:18
- Label: Interscope
- Composer: Jesse Lacey
- Lyricist: Jesse Lacey
- Producers: Mike Sapone; Brand New

Brand New singles chronology
"Sowing Season" (2006)	"Jesus Christ" (2007)	"(Fork and Knife)" (2007)

"Jesus Christ" (released as simply "Jesus" on the single) is a song by American rock band Brand New. It was released on March 26, 2007, as the second single from the band's third studio album The Devil and God Are Raging Inside Me.

The song peaked at No. 30 on Billboard's Alternative Airplay chart, the band's best-performing song on that listing. It was described in 2009 as "Brand New's most popular single to date". It was certified Gold by the Recording Industry Association of America (RIAA) in 2022.

== Background ==
The single's artwork references the art of the 1991 album Goat by the band The Jesus Lizard.

Alternative Press compared the song's sound to Modest Mouse.

The band performed the song on Late Night with Conan O'Brien on January 19, 2007, and on the Late Show with David Letterman on February 26, 2007. Pitchfork described the band's performance on Letterman as "seriously unnerving", presenting "Lacey as a spiritual husk".

The B-side to the single is "Brothers", which is a finished version of "Untitled 03" from the leaked demos for The Devil and God Are Raging Inside Me.

== Lyrics ==
The song contains references to Biblical figures including Thomas the Apostle and Elijah, influenced by Lacey's religious upbringing at Long Island's South Shore Christian School. Lacey said regarding religion: "My parents never forced anything on us, they just taught us what they believed in and let us decide kind of for ourselves afterwards. And I realized when I got older, that I have less answers than I thought I would and many more questions, and I guess my way of dealing with it is writing about it."

During Brand New's performance at the 2007 Reading Festival in the United Kingdom, Lacey said before playing the song, "I went to Vienna the other day and we were walking in the mountains, through this river and there was this landslide. The rocks were hitting the water at such velocity. There was a nearby town and some women and children died. This song is about that: the end of the world."

== Music video ==
A video for the song was filmed, directed by Matthew J. Santo. It went unreleased until Santo uploaded the video to YouTube himself on October 4, 2009.

== Reception ==
Stereogum listed it as Brand New's fifth-best song, praising it as "the crux that all of the doubt and conflict on Devil And God, a reckoning with the Father that seeks approval despite all of the darkness inside". The Arizona Republic also deemed it the band's fifth-best song, noting how it sounded "a million miles away from the angsty formulaic pop-punk of the first album." Louder Sound named it Brand New's third-best song, describing it as "not a song driven so much by belief as it is a song about wrestling with your spiritual and religious convictions." Alternative Press listed it amongst Brand New's top 10 songs.

PopMatters said the song "has more in common with Pink Floydian space rock than the quasi-emo outfits you might have previously linked Brand New with."

Former NBA basketball player Paul Shirley said "Jesus Christ" is "one of my favorite songs from the past decade".

In 2024, Alternative Press readers voted "Jesus Christ" as the fourth-saddest emo song of all time.

== Track listings ==
CD (US)

1. "Jesus" – 5:19
2. "Millstone (Alternate Version)" – 5:05
3. "Brothers" – 3:54

CD (Europe)

1. "Jesus" – 5:20
2. "Millstone (Alternate Version)" – 5:05

7-inch (UK)

1. "Jesus" – 5:18
2. "Brothers" – 3:54

== Covers ==
Dustin Kensrue, lead singer of the band Thrice, covered "Jesus Christ" in 2016 for his album Thoughts That Float on a Different Blood. The song was covered by Luna Shadows of New Zealand band The Naked and Famous. The American band Pvris covered the song during an acoustic set with Annie Mac on BBC Radio 1.

== Charts ==
Chart (2007)	Peak position
Scotland Singles (OCC)	36
UK Singles (OCC)	134
US Alternative Airplay (Billboard)	30

== Certifications ==
Region	Certification	Certified units/sales
United States (RIAA)	Gold	500,000^{‡}
^{‡} Sales+streaming figures based on certification alone.
