= II (Bad Books album) =

Studio album by Bad Books
- Released: October 9, 2012
- Recorded: January–March 2012
- Genre: Folk rock, indie rock, alternative rock
- Label: Triple Crown
- Producer: Andy Hull, Kevin Devine and Robert Mcdowell

Bad Books chronology
Bad Books (2010)	II (2012)	III (2019)

II is the second album from the folk/indie rock collaboration project by folk artist Kevin Devine and members of indie rock band Manchester Orchestra. It was released on October 9, 2012, exactly two years after the band's self-titled debut album, on Triple Crown Records. Like the first album, the songs written were collaborations between Kevin Devine and Manchester Orchestra's frontman Andy Hull.

Announcement on the album's title, release date and new label took place on the band's Facebook page on August 12, 2012. The next day, on August 13, the band streamed the first single off the album, "Forest Whitaker", for free on the Rolling Stone website, and on August 22, the single was released as an official digital single on iTunes.

On September 19, 2012, the band streamed the song "It Never Stops", exclusively through AbsolutePunk.

== Track listing ==
No.	Title	Length
1.	"The After Party"	3:33
2.	"No Reward"	3:22
3.	"Forest Whitaker"	3:43
4.	"It Never Stops"	3:20
5.	"Pyotr"	3:42
6.	"Friendly Advice"	3:47
7.	"No Sides"	3:27
8.	"Petite Mort"	3:23
9.	"42"	2:24
10.	"Lost Creek"	4:44
11.	"Ambivalent Peaks"	5:13

== Personnel ==
- Kevin Devine - lead vocals, guitar, piano
- Andy Hull - lead vocals, guitar, piano
- Robert McDowell - lead guitar, backing vocals
- Chris Freeman - keyboards, backing vocals
- Jonathan Corley - bass
- Ben Homola - drums, percussion

== II: Revisited ==
On the 9th of October 2023, remixes of The After Party and It Never Stops were released using artwork which revealed the upcoming release of II: Revisited. II: Revisited was released on the 20th of October 2023.
