= Split the Country, Split the Street =

Studio album by Kevin Devine
- Released: May 10, 2005
- Genre: Indie rock, alternative rock
- Label: Triple Crown, Defiance
- Producer: Kevin Devine, Chris Bracco, Mike Skinner

Kevin Devine chronology
Make the Clocks Move (2003)	Split the Country, Split the Street (2005)	Buried By The Buzzzz (2006)

Professional ratings
Review scores
Source	Rating
Punkbands.com	3/5 stars

Split the Country, Split the Street is a 2005 studio album by singer-songwriter Kevin Devine. It is Devine's third album and the second of two released on Triple Crown Records. It was the first solo record released after Devine was no longer in Miracle of 86 (a band in which he was the lead singer). The album features more rock-oriented songs with fuller band arrangements than his previous two releases, and was produced by Chris Bracco, Mike Skinner, and Devine.

Devine said the album "was done after [Miracle of 86] broke up, like the hangover from that. It was more bi-polar: aggressive rock songs with fuller instrumentation, but also songs with violins and glockenspiel or just a guy with a guitar." Despite the break, the album features former Miracle of 86 member Mike Robertson on guitar for three songs.

Early versions of "Haircut" and "Probably" were featured on the Travelling the EU EP. German record label Defiance Records released a double LP set with both Split the Country, Split the Street and Devine's previous album Make the Clocks Move (2003).

In a 2011 interview, Triple Crown Records founder Fred Feldman indicated a re-issue would be forthcoming; the re-issue was released on November 20, 2012 on CD and LP with two bonus tracks, new artwork, and new liner notes by Devine and Matt Pinfield.

== Track listing ==
1. "Cotton Crush" – 3:30 featuring Jesse Lacey
2. "Afterparty" – 3:48 featuring Jesse Lacey
3. "No Time Flat" – 4:18
4. "Keep Ringing Your Bell" – 3:09
5. "No One Else's Problem" – 2:39 featuring Jesse Lacey
6. "Buried by the Buzz" – 3:38
7. "Haircut" – 3:29
8. "Probably" – 3:58
9. "Alabama Acres" – 4:35
10. "Yr Damned Ol' Dad" – 2:35
11. "The Shift Change Splits the Streets" – 3:36
12. "You Are the Daybreak" – 2:33
13. "Lord, I Know We Don't Talk" – 5:34
14. "Bruise in a Brushwash"* – 3:29
15. "Order in the Court"* – 4:39

* "Bruise in a Brushwash" and "Order in the Court" are bonus tracks on the 2012 re-issue.
