= (Fork and Knife) =

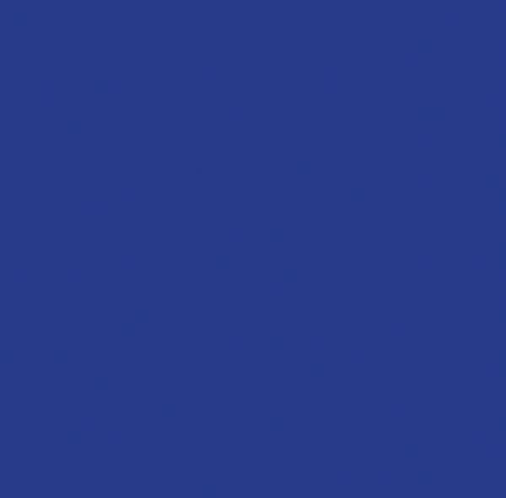

Single by Brand New
- Released: October 23, 2007
- Recorded: 2007
- Length: 4:06
- Label: Interscope
- Songwriters: Vincent Accardi; Jesse Lacey
- Producer: Brand New

Brand New singles chronology
"Jesus Christ" (2007)	"(Fork and Knife)" (2007)	"At the Bottom" (2009)

"(Fork and Knife)" is a 2007 single released by American rock band Brand New. Originally a demo that was leaked prior to the release of the band's third album The Devil and God Are Raging Inside Me, the song was officially released and made available via digital retailers on October 23, 2007.

The piano-driven song reached No. 85 on the Billboard Pop 100.

== Background ==
A demo version of "(Fork and Knife)" was leaked along with other demos for The Devil and God Are Raging Inside Me as "Untitled 07". It was recorded during the same sessions as the album, and the demo version was eventually officially released in 2015 on Leaked Demos 2006. This demo version was sampled on American singer Halsey's 2020 album Manic, on the track "Alanis' Interlude".

In a statement that came out with the song's release, the band said, "This is easily one of our favorite Brand New tracks here at HQ, and has been echoing through our halls since last November. You may know of this song as 'Untitled #7' or 'Piano Song' from the leaked demos." The song was written by guitarist Vincent Accardi and lead singer Jesse Lacey, and was produced by Mike Sapone.

Before its release, "(Fork and Knife)" was only played live once, at New Jersey's Starland Ballroom. The single version features slightly altered lyrics and a newly-written bridge.

The title of the song, "(Fork and Knife)" is a reference to a restaurant called Fork and Knife which was located underneath the Wantagh station of the LIRR (Long Island Rail Road), the hometown of guitarist Vincent Accardi. Alternative Press compared the song to Jack's Mannequin.

The track peaked at No. 24 on the Billboard Bubbling Under Hot 100 Singles Chart and No. 85 on the Billboard Pop 100.

== Charts ==
Chart (2007)	Peak position
UK Singles (OCC)	152
US Bubbling Under Hot 100 (Billboard)	24
US Pop 100 (Billboard)	85
