= III (Bad Books album) =

Studio album by Bad Books
- Released: June 14, 2019
- Genres: Indie folk, emo
- Label: Loma Vista
- Producers: Andy Hull, Kevin Devine and Robert McDowell

Bad Books chronology
II (2012)	III (2019)

III review scores
Aggregate scores
Source	Rating
Metacritic	76/100
Review scores
Source	Rating
AllMusic	3/5 stars
Exclaim!	8/10
Paste	7.6/10
Pitchfork	7.4/10
Punknews.org	3.5/5 stars
Sputnikmusic	5/5

III is the third album from Bad Books, the collaborative project from Kevin Devine and Manchester Orchestra members Andy Hull and Robert McDowell. The album was released in digital format on June 14, 2019, while the physical release took place on June 21, 2019, on Loma Vista Recordings.

The band performed for the first time since 2012 at South by Southwest on March 13, 2019, playing an acoustic poolside set that included songs from III. They later announced a summer headlining tour supporting the new album, including an appearance at Shaky Knees Music Festival.

== Track listing ==
No.	Title	Length
1.	"Wheel Well"	4:32
2.	"UFO"	2:27
3.	"Myths Made Plain"	2:46
4.	"Lake House"	4:02
5.	"I Love You, I'm Sorry, Please Help Me, Thank You"	4:32
6.	"Neighborhood"	2:29
7.	"I Wrote It Down For You"	3:32
8.	"Left Your Body"	2:51
9.	"Supposed To Be"	4:17
10.	"Army"	8:50

== Personnel ==
- Kevin Devine - lead vocals, guitar, percussion
- Andy Hull - lead vocals, guitar, piano
- Robert McDowell - piano, organ, string arrangements
