= Put Your Ghost to Rest =

Put Your Ghost To Rest

Studio album by Kevin Devine
- Released: October 17, 2006
- Genre: Indie rock, indie folk
- Label: Capitol; Procrastinate! Music Traitors (reissue)
- Producer: Rob Schnapf

Kevin Devine chronology
Buried By The Buzzzz (2006)	Put Your Ghost To Rest (2006)	Live at Austin City Limits Music Festival 2007: Kevin Devine (2007)

Professional ratings
Review scores
Source	Rating
Allmusic	3.5/5 stars

Put Your Ghost To Rest is Kevin Devine's fourth studio album. It was released on October 17, 2006 through Capitol Records. It was his first and only major label release as of 2009. It was produced by Rob Schnapf, who had previously produced records by Elliott Smith, of whom Devine is a fan.

In regards to the album's political and social themes, Devine said that "I was always very abstractly political. I listened to punk rock records and thought I could punch my time card. And then all this shit in the world made me have to sit up and pay attention – and that's a good thing. It's a scary time, so why ignore it?"

After being dropped by Capitol Records due to a merger with Virgin Records in early 2007, Put Your Ghost to Rest became increasingly hard to find in retail locations. In late 2007, Devine hinted at a re-release of the album with the aid of Brand New's record label, Procrastinate! Music Traitors; it was officially released on April 20, 2008. Both physical and digital versions of the album were available. Devine stated, "Capitol was cool enough to give us the record back with minimal hassle, which I'm real grateful for".

A limited double-LP vinyl version of Put Your Ghost To Rest was released by Brooklyn-based label Academy Fight Song in May 2007, limited to 500 copies on solid white–solid orange wax. The double LP also includes three b-sides: "Harvest Moon" by Neil Young, "Holland, 1945" by Neutral Milk Hotel, and a new version of Devine's own "Wolf's Mouth" (all of which also featured on the 2007 Tour EP and later the "Splitting Up Christmas" single). This vinyl is now out-of-print. A repressing of the album on vinyl was released in 2016 by Bad Timing Records, omitting the bonus tracks.

Paxen Films (a film collective featuring future Goddamn Band members Mike Strandberg and Brian Bonz) created a music video for the song "Brooklyn Boy" and a video featuring live clips and backstage footage for the song "Me and My Friends". Promo singles featuring "Brooklyn Boy" and "Just Stay" were produced, but no single was ever commercially released.

== Track listing ==
1. "Brooklyn Boy" – 3:30
2. "You're Trailing Yourself" – 3:03
3. "Just Stay" – 4:15
4. "You'll Only End Up Joining Them" – 4:17
5. "Billion Bees" – 3:32
6. "Less Yesterday, More Today" – 5:09
7. "Like Cursing Kids" – 2:37
8. "Go Haunt Someone Else" – 4:12
9. "The Burning City Smoking" – 5:32
10. "Me & My Friends" – 6:00
11. "Trouble" – 2:45
12. "Heaven Bound & Glory Be" – 4:57
