= Daisy (Brand New album) =

Studio album by Brand New
- Released: September 22, 2009
- Recorded: 2008–2009
- Studios: Sapone Studios, Bethpage, New York
- Genres: Art rock; post-hardcore; noise rock
- Length: 40:47
- Labels: Interscope; DGC; Procrastinate! Music Traitors
- Producers: Mike Sapone; Brand New

Brand New chronology
The Devil and God Are Raging Inside Me (2006)	Daisy (2009)	Leaked Demos 2006 (2015)

Brand New studio chronology
The Devil and God Are Raging Inside Me (2006)	Daisy (2009)	Science Fiction (2017)

Singles from Daisy
- 1. "At the Bottom" Released: August 11, 2009

Daisy is the fourth studio album by American rock band Brand New, released September 22, 2009 on Interscope. It was co-produced by both the band and their longtime producer Mike Sapone. Brand New recorded the album in Sapone's studio in Bethpage, New York between 2008 and 2009. The band looked to channel their live performances, as well as the noise of bands such as Fugazi, Polvo, Sonic Youth, My Bloody Valentine and The Jesus Lizard, in order to produce the raw and often chaotic sound of the album.

Guitarist Vincent Accardi had a larger role in writing the album's lyrics, sharing the responsibility with frontman Jesse Lacey. Accardi also wrote a majority of the album's music, according to Lacey. The album leaked three weeks prior to its release, and the song "At the Bottom" was the only single released. Daisy received positive reviews from critics, who praised the band's continued progression, while fans were somewhat more divided, with drummer Brian Lane believing that they either seem to love it or hate it. It debuted at number six in the United States, the band's first top-ten album.

== Background ==
With the writing and recording process commencing almost immediately after Brand New finished touring for The Devil and God Are Raging Inside Me, the band's members were inspired to capture the energy of their live performances. Despite having previously received acclaim for redefining their sound record-to-record, the band felt little pressure to repeat this. Drummer Brian Lane simply stated that as with previous recording sessions, the band had become bored of performing their older material and would naturally look to write and record songs that were different. Guitarist Vincent Accardi commented that "after The Devil and God, the structures of songs were a bit more complex and things were a little bit delicate. I think we all just had a great urge to try to write simple, loud rock songs and just get the point across immediately".

Lead singer Jesse Lacey commented that being signed to major label Interscope also shaped the sessions because "we thought it‘d be more interesting to put a very un-commercial record out on a very commercial label". Prior to recording, Accardi had been working on material with producer Mike Sapone. After his bandmates positively received some of the tracks he had been working on, Accardi gained the confidence to show them more and ultimately take a larger role in writing the album's lyrics. "I’d say a majority of the music on this album is written by Vin," Lacey revealed.

With previous album sessions, the band had always looked to maximize their labels' resources, working with different producers and in expensive studios, especially after signing to Interscope – but had always ended up coming back to Sapone. It was decided early on by the band that they would work with Sapone, using his studio. This would also allow the band to remain local to their homes while recording, and also allow them to spend their advance from the label on general living costs, as opposed to production and studio costs.

== Recording ==
With a number of songs already demoed by Accardi, the band began recording the album in March 2008. Recording took place at Sapone's home studio in Bethpage, New York. During the first few months of writing and recording, the band were often working five or six days a week, beginning work in the morning and not leaving Sapone's basement studio until the early hours.

As with previous sessions, Mike Sapone acted as both a band member and co-producer, while the band were also involved in the album's production. Discussing Sapone's involvement, Lacey defined him as having "as much at stake with the music as we do; he's as invested in it as we are, sometimes more." Accardi described Sapone as having "an uncanny ability to hear something you’re doing and immediately track it to any song in his library that he stores in his brain. He'll go to it, show it to you and tell you that that’s what needs to happen. Here's the better version of it. This is what you’re trying to do and you don't even realize it." Most of the songs were brought to the studio in acoustic form, sometimes as a complete song and sometimes as just a part or riff. The band would then build upon these ideas, recording everything as they worked. The band members were not limited by their normal roles within Brand New, with much instrument swapping and experimenting taking place in writing individual parts. Lacey later commented that "it was such a collaborative effort with the band. Vin might write a drum part or Brian might write a guitar part or whatever. We're not really keeping tabs of how much everyone has at stake on each song".

Recording Brian Lane's drums was approached song-by-song, as opposed to recording all of the album's drums in succession. This allowed Lane to experiment recording drums in different ways and places, predominately around Sapone's home. Lane commented that Sapone's living room was one of the main places they worked on the drums. The band's touring percussionist Ben Homala also contributed parts to the recording sessions, while Mike Sapone Jr. and Santino Sapone acted as drum technicians. Claudius Mittendorfer, who assisted with the recording of The Devil and God Are Raging Inside Me acted as an advisor during the sessions, while Michael Lapierre assisted the recording of "Be Gone", "Sink" and "Daisy". In addition, Vincent Accardi's brother Andrew contributed parts towards the recording.

Around a month before the album's completion, the band began looking through reels of old recordings that Lacey had collected, one of which contained "On Life's Highway", a gospel hymn written by Bertrand Brown. The band felt that the song fit perfectly as an opening and closing to the album, believing that there was something quite shocking in having something so pretty lead into something so aggressive in the opening track, "Vices". Samples of a Baptist church minister giving a sermon and a child speaking are also used in the title track "Daisy". In the case of previous album sessions, the band had spent around six months recording; however, with no set deadline from Interscope and no budget to be concerned about due to owning all of the equipment and studio, the band ended up spending around 12 months recording. Over the course of the album's production the band had written and demoed around 35 songs. This was narrowed down to 15 tracks, and then ultimately the final 11. The track "Lazy" by Brian Lane was amongst the songs cut, although Lacey was keen to include it on the final album.

The album was mixed by Dave Sardy. Emily Lazar, who previous worked with the band on The Devil and God Are Raging Inside Me mastered the album in her Greenwich Village, New York City studio, The Lodge, assisted by the band, Mike Sapone and Joe LaPorta.

== Music and lyrics ==
=== Style and influences ===
Daisy has been described as a post-hardcore, noise rock, and art rock album. Some reviewers noted how the album contains hints of grunge, blues and country.

Brand New cited bands such as Fugazi, Polvo and Archers of Loaf as influences for the album's sessions, while Brian Lane proclaimed that the main influence for their progression towards the more aggressive and raw sound was coming off of tour and being bored of the songs that they had been playing. Accardi had been listening to albums such as Ten by Pearl Jam, Jar of Flies by Alice in Chains, and Purple and Core by Stone Temple Pilots. Garrett Tierney looked to emulate some of the bass guitar sounds found on the records of The Jesus Lizard and Hüsker Dü.

The band's "bold" decision to incorporate uncompromisingly noisy elements into Daisy was influenced by Sonic Youth and My Bloody Valentine, who were "some of our favorite bands growing up." Rock Sound described the album as "more Sonic Youth and Failure-influenced than ever before". AllMusic described "You Stole" as a "connection between My Bloody Valentine and '50s surf rock" while Slant also compared the song's guitar parts to Loveless.

=== Lyrics ===
"Everyone has always had the opportunity to write anything that anyone wants in the band, it's just when we started this record Vinnie came with so much already. It had nothing to do with me; it had everything to do with Vin. He just came with everything completed already and it was so good we were all really excited as a band to follow his lead."

— Jesse Lacey discussing using more songs by Vincent Accardi

The album's lyrics, written by both Accardi and Lacey, are more abstract compared to many of those featured on previous album, The Devil and God Are Raging Inside Me. While Accardi had previously had some involvement in writing lyrics, Daisy saw him contribute far more compared to previous albums. Accardi and Lacey both affirmed that there had been no conscious decision made by the band on Accardi writing more. Lacey worked with Accardi to help refine his lyrics, as well as filling in any blanks. During writing, both Lacey and Accardi had unintentionally begun to reuse certain themes and imagery, such as nature and forests, as well as lyrics relating to an absence of love. Lacey also used his writing as a means of venting anxieties, comparing it to therapy, proclaiming, "Daisy was just the venting of anxiety, of letting go and doing the right thing for us personally and as a band. It’s a very hard way to do something but it is the best way. There’s a lot of pent up emotion that goes into owning up to who you are, what you are doing and the choices you are making, so Daisy was us rejoicing in that."

== Title and packaging ==
The band had been considering a number of different titles for the album and had first announced that it would be titled And One Head Can Never Die; however, the band made the last minute decision to change it to Daisy, which was also the name of one of the songs featured on the album.

The album's front cover is taken from photographer Peter Sutherland's Sightings series. Sutherland has described his photograph as being a chance encounter with a wild fox that momentarily stopped and stared straight into his lens while he was in the back garden at a friend's wedding party. Lacey acknowledged that the decision to use Sutherland's fox photograph reflected a running theme of darkness and nature that had subconsciously crept into the album. Additional photographs were provided by Alexa Lambros and Accardi, while Lacey worked with Jason Noto of Morning Breath Inc. on the packaging and layout of the album. Due to an increased popularity in vinyl, the band's label rush released production of the vinyl, leaving the band out of the process – with Lacey later commenting that he would have liked to have made the release differ from the CD version.

== Release and promotion ==
"When you're young and you start a band you think you'll record and go onstage and that's all there is, then suddenly someone wants to take your picture and ask your opinion on things, and you're excited, you're being paid attention to and you jump at that, looking back at it you realize it has nothing to do with why you started the band in the first place."

— Jesse Lacey discussing promoting Daisy

On July 17, 2008, the opening night of his solo tour in Seattle, Washington, Lacey debuted the song "Bought a Bride". On March 30, 2009, a video of Lacey and Accardi performing track titled "Gasoline" was posted online. On June 22, UK music magazine Rock Sound received an "early and incomplete" version of the band's "as yet untitled" album. The magazine went on to reveal the track listing, which was ultimately slightly different from the finished product, along with a tentative release date of September 7, 2009. On July 8, 2009, it was reported that the album would be titled And One Head Can Never Die, although days later the band changed it to Daisy.

The artwork and final track listing were officially announced on August 4, 2009, with a September 22, 2009 release date locked in. The band chose the song "At the Bottom" to act as the first single, believing it to be the "easiest song for people to hear, compared to the rest of the record". "At the Bottom" was made available to stream on Myspace on August 10, 2009, before being made available for digital download on August 11.

The album leaked into file-sharing websites around three weeks prior to its release, although Lane remarked "the fact that people are even interested enough to want to talk about the record, or when it leaks to even make the effort to download the record" was "all that really matters". On September 15, the band made Daisy available to stream through Myspace. In promoting the album, as with previous album The Devil and God Are Raging Inside Me, the band were very selective over which publications they would talk to, largely avoiding the American media altogether. The band also made the decision not to make conventional music videos, as well as ultimately only releasing one song as a single after scrapping the planned "Sink" single. Some publications speculated that Daisy would be the band's final album, claims which the band repeatedly denied.

The title track was used in the Smallville episode "Roulette", the fifth episode of the ninth season.

=== Touring ===
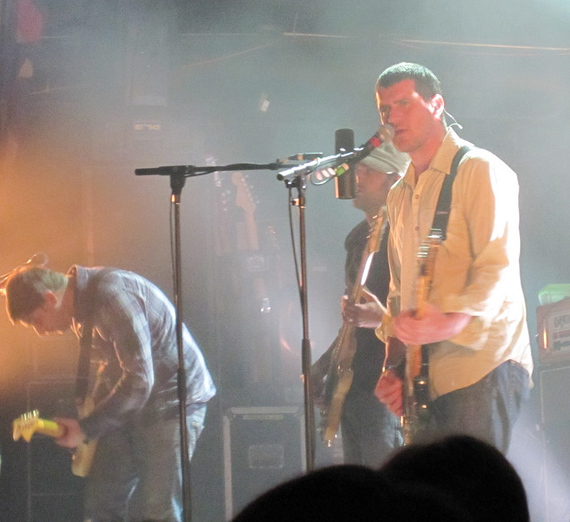
Jesse Lacey, Garrett Tierney and Derrick Sherman performing live at House of Blues in San Diego, California as part of their album tour in October 2009.

Lacey commented during a number of interviews that they would be somewhat less ambitious in touring, as they were keen to be at home "more than ever before". Despite this, the band still played a significant number of shows in 2009 and 2010 in promoting of Daisy, performing in the United States, United Kingdom, Canada and Australia.

The album's release was preceded by two festival appearances in Germany, as well as a six date tour of the United Kingdom at the end of June 2009, with support from Moneen. Brand New also performed on The Other Stage at Glastonbury Festival on June 28, 2009. The performance was filmed by the BBC, but the band decided against having the footage aired. Their UK dates were soon followed by a series of nine smaller club shows in the United States during July. Around the release of the album the band acoustically performed at record stores in New York City and Toronto.

Brand New performed at the main stage at Reading and Leeds Festival across the weekend of August 28. At the end of September 2009, the band embarked on a 44 date tour of the United States and Canada, performing at larger venues with support from Thrice, Manchester Orchestra, Glassjaw and Crime In Stereo. On January 23, 2010, the band performed their largest UK show to date at Wembley Arena in London, supported by Thrice and Glassjaw. The band went on a short five date tour of Australia in March 2010. A short four date US tour also took place in April 2010.

=== Daisy Studio Sessions ===
Daisy Studio Sessions is a collection of live studio recordings and interviews that were released as video and audio clips across September 2009, promoting their album Daisy. The sessions were recorded across a weekend in June 2009 in Greenpoint, Brooklyn in New York. Produced by the ApK Collective with Daniel Navetta directing and Tom Camuso recording, they were also joined by the band's frequent collaborator Mike Sapone who mixed the tracks.

Over the course of the sessions the band explored new and alternative arrangements to a number of their songs, both old and new, with some involving full band arrangements and others solely focusing on frontman Jesse Lacey. The band had not entered the studio with the intention to record alternate versions, but after setting up in the fairly confined studio, "there wasn’t really a feeling in the room that you wanted to play loudly," Accardi commented in an interview. Kevin Devine joined the band on the second day of recording for an alternate rendition of "Jesus", which Devine had previously covered at his solo shows and with Lacey. The recording would later be included as a b-side to the "At the Bottom" single, released on August 11, 2009.

On September 11, 2009, the band's record label Interscope released the first video from the session; a stripped back version of "Sowing Season" from their previous album The Devil and God Are Raging Inside Me which was accompanied by a short interview. Following the release, the band posted a blog to Myspace expressing their dissatisfaction of how the video was released, having hoped that the entire session would have been released "as a set, with an explanation of what we did and how we did it. And it would give people insight into what we have been up to", stating they were unsure when and where other tracks from the session would be released. The video for "At the Bottom" then premiered on Spinner.com on September 23, 2009, with producers ApK making the audio available separately through their blog.

Despite disapproving how the sessions were released and being initially timid at the prospect of being filmed, Jesse Lacey commented that he had enjoyed the sessions and appreciated how it seemed to resonate with fans. Audio versions of the sessions were made available as bonus tracks from different digital retailers. The video to "Bed" remains unreleased, while the audio to "Sowing Season" also went unreleased.

== Reception ==
Professional ratings
Aggregate scores
Source	Rating
Metacritic	75/100
Review scores
Source	Rating
AbsolutePunk	9/10
AllMusic	3/5 stars
Alternative Press	3.5/5 stars
Kerrang!	4/5 stars
NME	9/10
Punknews.org	4/5 stars
Rock Sound	9/10
Rolling Stone	3.5/5 stars
Spin	8/10
Sputnikmusic	5/5 stars

=== Critical reception ===
Daisy received positive reviews from most music critics. At Metacritic, which assigns a normalized rating out of 100 to reviews from mainstream critics, the album received an average score of 75, based on twelve reviews, which indicates "generally favorable reviews".

Dan Martin of NME described Daisy as a "breathtakingly accomplished record", calling Brand New the "most graceful rock band in America". Drew Beringer of AbsolutePunk commented "Daisy is auditory proof, as this is the Long Island quintet’s most challenging and distinguished album yet", believing "Some will love it, some will hate it, most will be perplexed by it and will need many listens to digest it. But one thing is certain, this is a record that will shake you". Rock Sound also heaped praise upon the album, making comparisons to The Cure, The Smiths and Nirvana. Chris Hidden described the album as a more refined version of previous album, The Devil and God Are Raging Inside Me, summarizing that "Brand New are now artistically unrivaled by their peers; it would be astonishing if they didn’t see where else they could go". Mikael Wood for Spin particularly praised the moments of surprise throughout the album. "Jesse Lacey howls about burning in bed and turning to dirt while his bandmates churn out noisy, jagged art-punk riffs that routinely explode without warning. The sound is old-fashioned, but the fury is fresh". Christian Hoard of Rolling Stone praised the band for not sticking to genre restraints; "The quartet's fourth album avoids genre commonplaces with subtle shadings. 'You tried to put a fire out, but you used gasoline' — and songs like the heroin-jag slow-burner "Bed" prove that letting rip isn't always Lacey's best move." Adam Downer of Sputnikmusic gave the album a 5/5, declaring "Daisy is broken and Daisy is violent. It is not romantic and it is not particularly deep. It's this writhing, bitter little record, obsessed with mortality as if the thing were breathing down its neck."

AllMusic writer Andrew Leahey praised the band's experimentation, although felt at times Daisy on the band's centrepiece formula from previous albums of jumping "from quiet moments to grating, full-throttle freakouts". Scott Heisel of Alternative Press compared the album to Nirvana's In Utero, stating "Brand New’s fourth album eschews elaborate arrangements for a record that feels half-improvised at times and brutally raw throughout", claiming that it was an album made by a band who "just don’t give a fuck", summarizing "it’s entirely possible that the band simply wrote a good album this time around, not a great one." BBC's Chris Beanland felt Daisy showed that "by expanding their palette, Brand New may have lost some of their own identity", although commented that "Even though they’ve self-consciously tried to grow up musically and ditched the sound that their first wave of fans loved, chances are that even the most initially dismissive listener will find a soft spot for Brand New’s current clutch of bruised confessionals." Slant compared Lacey's vocal performances to Isaac Brock and David Yow, noted the similarities to Mission of Burma on "At the Bottom" and praised Accardi's guitar work for invoking In Utero and Loveless. Spin said that "Brand New might be the only guys in emo who still care more about Rites of Spring than they do about Weezer."

==== Accolades ====
Daisy was placed third on the Top Thirty Albums of 2009 list by AbsolutePunk.net. Kerrang! ranked the album eleventh on their K! Critics' Albums of the Year list. The album was placed at fourteenth on Rock Sound on Top Seventy Five Albums of the Year. In Sputnikmusic Staff Picks: Top Fifty Albums of the Year list, the album was placed at twenty-eight. Spin placed the album at twenty-one on their The 30 Best Albums of 2009... So Far list.

=== Fan reception ===
Upon its release, drummer Brian Lane noted that fans either seem to love the album or "fucking hate it". In an interview with Kerrang!, lead vocalist Jesse Lacey commented on the album's content: "It's a pretty exhausting record. It's quite dense and I think some of the decisions we made don't always go in the most obvious direction. We were thinking a lot more about what we'd want to play when we were up onstage rather than actually what you'd want to hear on a record." Pitchfork wrote in 2016 that "it’s certainly the one the least number of Brand New fans would say is their best."

=== Commercial performance ===
Daisy debuted at number six on the Billboard 200, selling 46,000 copies in its first week. At the time of its release, it was the highest-charting album by Brand New, besting their previous high of number 31 by The Devil and God Are Raging Inside Me in 2006.

== Track listing ==
All music is composed by Brand New and Mike Sapone (Jesse Lacey, Vincent Accardi, Garrett Tierney, Brian Lane, Derrick Sherman)

No.	Title	Lyrics	Length
1.	"Vices"	Jesse Lacey	3:24
2.	"Bed"	Lacey	3:10
3.	"At the Bottom"	Vincent Accardi, Lacey	4:04
4.	"Gasoline"	Accardi	3:32
5.	"You Stole"	Accardi, Lacey	6:00
6.	"Be Gone"	Accardi	1:31
7.	"Sink"	Lacey	3:20
8.	"Bought a Bride"	Lacey	3:07
9.	"Daisy"	Accardi	3:06
10.	"In a Jar"	Accardi, Lacey	3:06
11.	"Noro"	Accardi	6:27

iTunes Store bonus track
No.	Title	Length
12.	"At the Bottom" (Live in Studio)	3:50

Amazon.com exclusive
No.	Title	Length
12.	"Bought a Bride" (Live in Studio)	3:24

Australia iTunes Store bonus track
No.	Title	Length
12.	"Bed" (Live in Studio)	3:01

== Personnel ==
Brand New

- Jesse Lacey – lead vocals, guitar, keyboards, programming, artwork, lyrics
- Vinnie Accardi – guitar, backing vocals, lead vocals on "Be Gone", drums, photography, lyrics
- Garrett Tierney – bass guitar, backing vocals
- Brian Lane – drums, percussion, guitar
- Derrick Sherman – guitar, keyboards, piano, backing vocals

Additional musicians

- Mike Sapone
- Andrew Accardi
- Benjamin Homola - percussion, drums

Production

- Mike Sapone – producer, engineer
- Michael Lapierre – recording assistant
- D. Sardy – mixing
- Emily Lazar – mastering
- Joe LaPorta – mastering assistant
- Mike Sapone jr. – drum technician
- Santino Sapone – drum technician
- Claudius Mittendorfer – advisor
- Jason Noto – artwork
- Peter Sutherland – cover photo
- Alexa Lambros – photography
- Ariel Martin – A&R

== Chart performance ==
Chart (2009)	Peak position
Australian Albums (ARIA)	40
UK Albums (Official Charts)	47
US Billboard 200	6
US Top Alternative Albums (Billboard)	3
US Top Rock Albums (Billboard)	3
