= She Stayed as Steam =

EP by Kevin Devine
- Released: July 6, 2010
- Genre: Indie rock, alternative rock
- Label: Favorite Gentlemen, These Are Not, Big Scary Monsters

Kevin Devine chronology
I Could Be the Only One (2010)	She Stayed as Steam (2010)	Between the Concrete and Clouds (2011)

She Stayed as Steam is an EP by Kevin Devine, featuring outtakes and alternate versions of tracks from Brother's Blood.

The two outtakes featured are the title track, "She Stayed as Steam", and "Big Bad Man". On the day of release, he elaborated more on the two songs via a blog on Favorite Gentlemen's website, stating the two songs were difficult to leave off Brother's Blood and ""never felt like B-sides, but more like A-minus sides? I don't know if that's even right… They're realized and I'm proud of them and I'm thrilled they're getting a proper and pretty platform.'"

This same full band version of "She Stayed as Steam" featured as a bonus track on international versions of Brother's Blood. An acoustic demo (with slight lyrical changes) was shared by Kevin online and featured on theI Could Be With Anyone EP.

The EP also features two remixes, one of "Hand of God" by Plosive (a pseudonym of Chris Bracco, who has produced a number of Kevin's releases), along with a remix for "Another Bag of Bones" by Trevor Dowdy of I Married My Highschool Sweetheart, a Favorite Gentlemen labelmate.

The EP was released on a limited edition "Coke bottle green"12" viny (limited to 750 copies), along with a digital download. Two live tracks from a session on FM 4 serve as vinyl exclusive tracks.

The version of Ballgame from the FM4 session is slightly alternate version Kevin has played on tour and features an extended ending with additional lyrics.

The cover of the EP is a photograph by Ofer Wolberger, who has previously worked with These Are Not Records for the Elf Power "Venus and Mercury" 10" vinyl.

== Track listings ==
=== Digital download ===
No.	Title	Length
1.	"She Stayed as Steam"	5:42
2.	"Big Bad Man"	4:45
3.	"Breathe, Breathe Deep ("Hand of God" RMX by Plosive)"	4:56
4.	"Another Bag of Bones (Devastation of Death RMX by Trevor Dowdy)"	4:44

=== Vinyl ===
No.	Title	Length
1.	"She Stayed As Steam"	5:42
2.	"Breathe, Breathe Deep ("Hand of God" RMX by Plosive)"	4:56
3.	"Chelsea Hotel No.2 (FM4 Session, Vienna, AT, 3/10/10)"	4:08
4.	"Big Bad Man"	4:45
5.	"Another Bag of Bones (Devastation of Death RMX by Trevor Dowdy)"	4:44
6.	"Ballgame (FM4 Session, Vienna, AT, 3/10/10)"	7:20
