= The Devil and God Are Raging Inside Me =

Studio album by Brand New
- Released: November 21, 2006
- Recorded: March 2005 – April 2006
- Studios: Cove City (Glen Cove); Long View Farm (North Brookfield); Sapone (Bethpage)
- Genres: Alternative rock; emo; indie rock; post-hardcore; art rock
- Length: 54:51
- Labels: Interscope; Tiny Evil; Procrastinate! Music Traitors
- Producers: Mike Sapone; Brand New

Brand New chronology
The Holiday EP (2003)	The Devil and God Are Raging Inside Me (2006)	Daisy (2009)

Brand New studio chronology
Deja Entendu (2003)	The Devil and God Are Raging Inside Me (2006)	Daisy (2009)

Singles from The Devil and God Are Raging Inside Me
- 1. "Sowing Season" Released: November 21, 2006; 2. "Jesus Christ" Released: March 26, 2007

The Devil and God Are Raging Inside Me is the third studio album by American rock band Brand New. It was released on November 21, 2006 through Interscope Records as the band's major label debut. The album was recorded from 2005 to 2006 on Long Island and Massachusetts with producer Mike Sapone. It arose following the online leaking of several unfinished demos that were meant to be early blueprints of the upcoming record.

Two singles from the album were released – "Sowing Season" alongside the album on November 21, 2006, and "Jesus Christ" on March 26, 2007. The album peaked at No. 31 on the Billboard 200, becoming the band's highest-charting record at the time of its release. In 2022, the album was certified Gold by the RIAA, denoting sales of over 500,000 copies in the United States alone.

The album saw Brand New fully leave behind their pop punk origins in favor of an indie rock direction. Lyrically, it was praised for the band's continued progression and maturity as songwriters by delving into darker subject matters such as existentialism, death, depression and religion.

The Devil and God Are Raging Inside Me received positive reviews from critics. Publications including Pitchfork, Spin, The Los Angeles Times and Alternative Press compared the album to the work of Radiohead, and several pronounced it as one of the best albums of the decade. Its legacy grew in the years since its release, and it is now credited as one of the most important emo albums of all time by critics and fellow musicians. The band performed the album in full on a 2016 tour to commemorate the album's tenth anniversary and again in 2026 for its 20th anniversary.

== Background and recording ==
In mid-2004, after four years of regular touring and recording as Brand New, they took time off to concentrate on their personal lives and pursue other projects. At this point, the band had already written and recorded "10 or 11 songs" that they believed would form the next album. In a January 2005 interview, Lacey expressed his fear of the band having already reached their artistic peak. "I hope that Deja isn't our Loveless for anyone. That would be very upsetting for me, because that would mean that the person listening to it isn't allowing us the possibility of getting even better."

"There is that arc in so many people's careers where they start this upward trajectory and they make this amazing thing, and then it just drops off after that. I don't know if those bands just literally made the best thing they could make, or they started believing certain things and became jaded by what that record did for them."

— Lacey discussing his fear of the band falling off

The band began the album with producer Dennis Herring in Oxford, Mississippi. Due to time and budget constraints, they decided to return to New York and hire Mike Sapone as producer instead, whose Bethpage studio was close to the band members' homes. Recording with Sapone occurred from winter 2005 to spring 2006 at Long View Farm Studios in Massachusetts as well as Cove City and Sapone's basement studio. Lacey described Sapone as "more like a fifth or sixth bandmember" than a producer, allowing the band more control and freedom to be experimental. During the recording process, all band members experienced deaths amongst their families and friends, and Lacey recalled that each of them had become a little too comfortable with the idea of a funeral. The band found that the material they wrote in 2005 sounded thematically different from their 2004 sessions, and did away with that material in favor of a clean slate.

Live guitarist Derrick Sherman who had been touring with the band for some time was also present during the recording sessions, contributing parts to all of the album's tracks. With the initial scrapped album session from 2004 and the leaked demos in 2006, the band had written and recorded around forty tracks for the album.

As the band's first release on a major label, the band expressed hesitancy and nervousness over their increased fame. In an interview with their street team, Tierney said his biggest fear was "get[ting] too big", while Lacey's was that he was "scared of the hype" and "scared of people who never heard our band trying to sell it to people who are, you know, breathing it already."

Music executive Luke Wood of Interscope Records expressed frustration with the math rock and Slint influence on the early drafts of The Devil and God Are Raging Inside Me. "I thought you were going to be like Bruce Springsteen," he told the band. Wood and Jimmy Iovine had multiple discussions with the band in order to make the album something that Interscope felt was worth releasing. On working with a major label, Lacey revealed that "external forces" made the band feel "more pressure to not progress on this album than ever before." He also admitted that "left to ourselves, we probably would have been more self-indulgent and released something that wasn’t financially in anyone’s interest. Unfortunately, our creative decisions are no longer ours to be made alone."

=== Leaked demos ===
"In one way it was kind of refreshing and motivating to know that people were still so interested and curious as to what we were up to in that period where we sort of disappeared. But I was also worried that it would derail the process because the four of us had created a pretty safe place where the only critics were ourselves. As much as we tried to shield ourselves from letting the leak affect us, it definitely did. There was a feeling of being robbed, after keeping everything so close to ourselves and then having it heard before it was completed."

— Brand New guitarist Vincent Accardi speaking about the leak of the demos

On January 24, 2006, nine untitled demos for the album leaked onto the Internet. The band was disappointed to hear of the leak; however, they had already been performing new tracks at live shows.

Initially leaked without song titles, two of the songs would be re-recorded for the album, with two others being re-recorded and released on singles from the album. Early versions of "Sowing Season" and "Luca" (with a possible early title of "Mamas") feature on the demos, with the original recording of the latter seeing official release in the UK edition of the album as "Luca (Reprisal Version)". "Brother's Song" was reworked as "aloC-acoC" and released on the "Sowing Season" single, while the original demo featured the "Jesus Christ" single under the title "Brothers". A completed version of "(Fork and Knife)" recorded during The Devil and God Are Raging Inside Me sessions was released as a standalone single in 2007.

Music writer Channing Freeman of Sputnikmusic commended the band for their reaction to the leaks, praising them for starting over and recording original tracks that showed more growth and development than the demos. "It was probably the best thing that could have happened to Brand New," he said, "because it forced them to rewrite the album with an even greater purpose and attention to detail."

Often referred to by fans as Fight Off Your Demons, the batch of leaked demos were remastered and officially released to the public on December 2, 2015 as Leaked Demos 2006, made available digitally and on cassette. On July 13, 2016, the band released 3 Demos, Reworked, an EP that consisted of re-recorded versions of "Brother's Song", "Missing You" and "1996". With that release, only one demo ("Good Man") has yet to be re-recorded; however, an extended version with new lyrics and a full band arrangement was debuted at Lacey's solo show in Nashville on March 2, 2025.

== Music and influence ==
"I'm getting depressed with all of the anxiety about the album, and they say I write my best stuff when I'm in that state. Great, I'll spend the next six months all depressed and the rest of the band will be excited so that some good [material] might come out. And then I have to contend with how it's received."

— Vocalist Jesse Lacey on how his depression impacted the album's writing

Vocalist and guitarist Jesse Lacey wrote lyrics for all of the album's tracks with the exception of "Handcuffs", which was written by Vincent Accardi. The tracks "Degausser" and "Sowing Season" were composed spontaneously as a band, whilst Accardi composed the music for "Handcuffs", "Not the Sun" and "Welcome to Bangkok", with Lacey writing the rest.

Death and illness became two of the main themes present on the record. In an interview Lacey commented that the band purposely immersed themselves in the loss of friends and family to channel it into their songwriting and expel it. The liner notes dedicate the album to "Robert Sherman, Red Lacey, Leo Lacey, Bill and Virginia Sherman, James McAuliffe, Rosemary Kancelerski, Frances Ambrosio, Manfred Cardone III, Sid Rosen, Seymour Lane, Michelle Lane, George Moe, Alexander Lambros, and Omir Ortega, all of whom left us between the start and completion of the record."

=== Lyrical content ===
Lacey suffered from depression during the writing stage of the album due to anxiety revolving around the high expectations put upon the band following the critical success of Deja Entendu. As with previous Brand New records, he drew inspiration from popular culture and literature for his lyrics. Lacey also wrote about subjects that he would discuss with his friend Kevin Devine, with some of Lacey's lyrics directly responding to questions that Devine would ask him during writing.

The second verse to opening track "Sowing Season" is inspired by the Rudyard Kipling poem If— whilst the title of "Sowing Season" is a reference from Stephen King's novel Secret Window, Secret Garden, where the main character had written a short story of the same title. The song deals with topics such as death (as per the notable opening line of the album, "was losing all my friends, was losing them to drinking and to driving") and the desire to better oneself.

"Millstone", track two, is described by Sputnikmusic as being about "not a loss of hope but rather a loss of innocence", citing lines such as "I used to pray that God was listening / I used to make my parents proud" as examples of such. "Jesus Christ" is about "analyzing crises of faith" in a conversation with God, making references to Biblical figures such as Thomas the Apostle and Elijah. Its lyrics touch on loneliness, the validity of the afterlife and the struggle to maintain faith, influenced by Lacey's religious upbringing and his attending South Shore Christian School during his adolescence. The single's artwork pays homage to the album Goat by The Jesus Lizard.

The fourth track, "Degausser", borrows the lyric "Take apart the demon, in the attic to the left" from the Roky Erickson track "Bloody Hammer".

The fifth song on the album, "Limousine (MS Rebridge)", is about the death of 7-year-old Katie Flynn from the band's hometown of Long Island that happened on July 2, 2005. Travelling home with her family after a wedding, their limousine was hit by drunk driver Martin Heidgen, a few miles from where Lacey was living at the time, leading to the tragic decapitation of the young Flynn, whose severed head fell into her mother's arms. In the track, Lacey tells the story from various perspectives, including that of Flynn's mother, Heidgen and Flynn herself. Lacey has commented that the story particularly resonated with him as he knew people who drove drunk the week the accident took place. Producer Mike Sapone had the idea to include samples of explosions in the track, hence the subtitle "MS Rebridge", with MS being Sapone's initials. At seven minutes and forty-two seconds, it remained Brand New's longest song until 2017's "Batter Up," which is eight minutes and twenty-eight seconds long. The track's bridge repeats itself seven times as Lacey counts up, one for each year of Flynn's life. "Limousine" is often cited as Brand New's greatest song.

Writing for Louder Sound, Mischa Pearlman believed the title and lyrics of "Luca" reference the fictional character Luca Brasi of the 1972 American crime film The Godfather. "The Archers' Bows Have Broken" is described as being about people who use religion for self-serving purposes instead of the intentions of the prophets, including in politics. Its aural traits include "the sound of nihilism and religion converging, and the world burning down as a result."

== Title and artwork ==
"The phrase itself was pretty cool, and reading it somewhere else would be striking, so that was what drew me to it, but listening back to the album I realised how much it represents quiet and loud, the good and evil, but it also has a lot to do with faith and some spiritual aspects of the band."

— Jesse Lacey discussing the album's title

The name of the album came from a conversation Jesse Lacey had with a friend regarding Daniel Johnston, a musician who suffered from schizophrenia and bipolar disorder.

The album cover is a picture titled "Untitled #44" from Nicholas Prior's "Age of Man" collection which the band saw at an art show in New York City. The outside of the cardboard case contains no song listings, and does not contain the name of the album or the band name anywhere but on the spine. The record company instead placed stickers on the plastic wrapping to indicate the name of the album and band, and on the UK version to indicate that it had the bonus track.

In 2021, Far Out listed the album's artwork at number one in a list of the top ten iconic photographs used as album covers. "Brand New were experts in the aggressively whiny form of rock and roll known as emo, and credit where credit is due, they were by and large one of the most musically talented propagators of the genre. They also loved stark images for their album covers, as opposed to the busy and lurid ugliness of their peers."

== Release and promotion ==
=== Original release and touring ===
In June and July 2006, the band went on their first tour in three years, during which, they debuted "Sowing Season", "Degausser", "Luca", and "(Fork and Knife)". The album was announced September 10, 2006. On October 5, the album's title and track listing was revealed. From mid October to early December, the band went on a U.S. tour alongside Dashboard Confessional. On October 18, the album's cover art was revealed. Two days later, "Sowing Season" was made available for streaming via the band's Myspace account. Throughout October and November the band performed a series of in-store acoustic gigs. On November 14, "Degausser" was made available for streaming via the band's PureVolume account. The Devil and God Are Raging Inside Me was made available for streaming on November 20, and released a day later through Interscope. The album was original planned to be released on DreamWorks, but the label was folded into Interscope. People that pre-ordered the album received a CD single of "Sowing Season" with the B-side "Coca Cola". People that pre-ordered the album from Best Buy were able to download a video for "--".

In January 2007, the band announced they were in the process of making a music video. In February, the band went on their first UK tour in three years. After touring and promoting previous record Déjà Entendu, the band became increasingly reluctant to give interviews or talk to the press in promotion of the record. In one of a few exceptions during the UK tour, Lacey discussed that this was due to many journalists and publications misrepresenting and taking quotes out of context to make their interviews more interesting. Lacey also felt "more comfortable" not having to worry about photo shoots and music videos and instead just concentrate on writing and performing music. Few television, radio or online performances were given either. Lead singer Jesse Lacey was interviewed by WFNX on April 24, 2007 at the First Act Guitar Studio, Boston as part of an acoustic performance for VW Green Room that was subsequently made available to download. The track "Jesus Christ" was performed on both NBC's Late Night with Conan O'Brien and the Late Show with David Letterman on CBS.

In March and April 2007, the band went on a tour of the U.S. "Jesus Christ" was released to radio on March 27. The song peaked at No. 30 on Billboard's Alternative Songs chart, beating the No. 37 peak of "The Quiet Things That No One Ever Knows" to become the band's biggest hit on alternative radio. In July and August, Lacey went on a solo tour with Kevin Devine and Grace Read. In August, the band played several European festivals including Reading and Leeds in the United Kingdom, Lowlands in the Netherlands, Pukkelpop in Belgium and FM4 Frequency Festival in Austria. From October to December, the band went on a tour of the U.S. with Thrice and MewithoutYou. A music video for "Jesus Christ" directed by Moh Azima was produced; however, it was never used by the band. Originally made available in 2009 before being taken down, Azima made the video available to stream on his own website in January 2012.

"Archers" was featured in the 2008 racing video game Burnout Paradise, and "Sowing Season" was included in the 2009 rhythm music game Guitar Hero 5. A live fancam performances of "Sowing Season" from the band's show at The Academy in Newcastle upon Tyne in February 2012 was made available by O2, with another performance from Brazil in July 2014.

In 2023, Interscope's Luke Wood recalled the band's desire for lack of promotion for the album, "There wasn't a music video, there wasn’t even a photo shoot. There wasn't a bio. They wanted none of it. They were retreating from the commercialization of the genre they came from. They were like, 'Okay, everybody else is this, we're gonna be that.'" The only promotional appearances from the band were performance of "Jesus Christ" on Conan O'Brien and David Letterman.

=== Vinyl release and lyric booklets ===
After a July 30, 2008 solo show, Lacey stated that the long wait for the vinyl release of The Devil and God Are Raging Inside Me was due primarily to the band's failure to secure the rights of Nicholas Prior's photograph. Lacey continued on saying that after the band either secured the rights to the picture, or chose an alternate cover, only then would the album be released on vinyl. The band managed to secure the rights to the image by 2010, and released the album on vinyl in that same year.

On January 11, 2010, Brand New announced via their Twitter account that The Devil and God Are Raging Inside Me would be released as a double vinyl LP set through Procrastinate! Music Traitors and Triple Crown Records. This version included a lyric sheet that was not included with the original CD. The vinyl set was made available in stores on March 23, 2010. Another pressing of the album was done by Academy Fight Song, which went up for pre-order on their website on May 17, 2010. This pressing was released on September 17, 2010. The album was repressed by Music on Vinyl in late 2013.

Upon the album's release, the band requested in the liner notes for fans to send them $1 in the mail to receive a lyric booklet. The album initially did not include lyrics because the band ran out of room and preferred to put other photographs in the liner booklet instead. In April 2015, the band began sending out lyric booklets to fans that had sent them $1 nine years previously. The first pressing of the lyric booklets titled Pogolith 000 contained a number of stickers, patches and a poster alluding to the release of the leaked demos from the album. A second "no thrills" version was subsequently made available at the band's merchandise kiosk at shows and on their website.

== Critical reception ==
Professional ratings
Aggregate scores
Source	Rating
Metacritic	78/100
Review scores
Source	Rating
AllMusic	4.5/5 stars
Alternative Press	5/5 stars
Blender	4/5 stars
The Boston Phoenix	3.5/4 stars
Entertainment Weekly	B−
The Guardian	3/5 stars
NME	8/10
Pitchfork	8.5/10
Rolling Stone	3/5 stars
Spin	3.5/5 stars

The Devil and God are Raging Inside Me received critical acclaim. At Metacritic, which assigns a normalized rating out of 100 to reviews from mainstream critics, the album received an average score of 78, based on 17 reviews. Critics emphasized the album's artistic leap in songwriting from the band's previous records.

NME wrote, "This album deals in dense, melodic post-rock in thrall to Pixies and My Bloody Valentine, raging between devilish scuzzcore and godlike softness." Alternative Press famously declared "America finally gets their own Radiohead" and described the album as "the sound of four men hitting absolute rock bottom and desperately trying to rescue themselves through any means necessary", ultimately concluding that "Simply put, Brand New have no peers." AllMusic praised how "textural and sonic layers unfold at every turn – punching drums and trembling guitars here, aching vocals and subtle touches of string there... it's almost ridiculous to think that the band cut its teeth with poppy anthems."

The Los Angeles Times said that the album "conjured up Radiohead crossed with Nirvana", while The New York Times said that the "angry tangles of guitar and opaque lyrics of spiritual crisis" sounded like "a cross between Pink Floyd and Nirvana." Spin noted that "the mall-ready hooks and occasional stabs at acoustic pop on Deja Entendu have been replaced by the sort of Radiohead-indebted bombast that begs to be played at lease-breaking volumes", concluding that "Brand New no longer sound like a wounded emo band." Ben Sisario of Blender hailed Lacey's ability to "lead a bipolar odyssey of blood and guts and desperate prayer, and at the end of his worries lies the ultimate fear: that God doesn’t care." Andrew Blackie of PopMatters called it "certainly more mature, putting breakup and self-infliction clichés, thankfully, behind them", specifically praising the build of "Limousine" from "acoustic vocal accompaniment à la Elliott Smith into dense, bottom-ended noise-rock elite."

Sputnikmusic staff writer Channing Freeman gave the album a perfect five stars, firmly declaring "there are hundreds of albums to which I am connected in unique ways but this is the only one that asks me big questions, expects big answers, and does not hold it against me when I come up with the same old pile of bullshit that I always do." Praising "Limousine" as Lacey's best song lyrically and a "pinnacle of modern songwriting" along with "Degausser", "Sowing Season" and "You Won't Know", Freeman stated that the album "features one of the largest progressions I have ever seen from a band... most bands don't show that sort of growth even once throughout their career, but Brand New have done it twice."

=== Accolades ===
Publication	Accolade	Rank
Consequence of Sound	Top 20 Major Label Debuts by Indie Bands That Made the Leap	8
NME	The Top 100 Greatest Albums of the Decade	74
Sputnikmusic	Top 100 Albums of the Decade	20

== Commercial performance ==
The album debuted at No. 31 on the Billboard 200, in comparison to the No. 63 debut of their prior album Deja Entendu. It sold 60,000 copies in its first week. It also peaked at No. 5 on Billboard's Digital Albums Chart. A 2014 vinyl repressing of the album led to a No. 10 peak on the August 23, 2014 edition on the Billboard Vinyl Albums chart.

In November 2022, the album was certified Gold by the Recording Industry Association of America (RIAA), signifying 500,000 copies sold.

== Legacy and influence ==
The Devil and God Are Raging Inside Me was Brand New's most critically acclaimed record until the release of Science Fiction in 2017 and was frequently considered to be their best album. During a 2012 interview, Lacey said the album "saved Brand New", calling it a "course correction" for the band's musical path. In 2016, ten years after its release, Lacey mentioned this album as a particularly important work for the band, and one that they "still use as a measuring post with which we compare the music we make now".

It was rated the best album of 2006 by Punknews and placed at number 74 in NME's list of the one-hundred best albums of the 2000s. Sputnikmusic ranked the album No. 20 on their list of the Top 100 Best Albums of the 2000s, as voted by staff members, and it was ranked at number 16 in Kerrang!'s "50 Albums You Need to Hear Before You Die" list. Alternative Press praised it as "arguably the best guitar rock album of the past 15 years" because "there hadn’t been an album this good at heady bombast since Radiohead’s OK Computer and, frankly, there hasn’t been one as good since."

The tenth anniversary of The Devil and God Are Raging Inside Me spawned several discussions regarding the album's legacy on Brand New, on the genres of post-hardcore, indie rock and emo, and on music as a whole. In a retrospective review, Ian Cohen of Pitchfork said that "by leaving his words and intentions up to interpretation, Lacey unwittingly shifted from a minor celebrity to a generational voice", giving the album an 8.5 out of 10 and comparing it to other critically acclaimed indie rock records of the 2000s such as Kid A and The Moon & Antarctica. Nina Corcoran of Consequence of Sound credited Brand New for "end[ing] the need to feel ashamed for connecting to emo", noting that the album's influence "altered the path of emo and alternative rock bands at large, blurred genre lines and bolded something beyond the band." In an article titled "The Immortality of Brand New's 'The Devil and God Are Raging Inside Me'", Vice staff writer Ryan Bassil declared "by cutting to the core of the darkest elements of the human experience, never answering any questions, but presenting the feeling within them, it is a record that has the ability to grow with the listener, gaining more and more significance as life goes on."

Fellow musicians also commented on the album's influence and legacy. Tour mate and friend of the band Kevin Devine reflected on the first time he heard the track "Jesus Christ", praising it as "the best song [Brand New] had ever written... emotionally, educationally, intellectually, structurally, in every way". Labeling "Degausser" and "You Won't Know" as other album highlights, Devine referred to the bridge of "Not the Sun" as "[his] favorite minute of music in their catalog" and the album's legacy as "The Dark Side of the Moon but for emo", a comparison that he did not expect upon first listen. Andy Hull, frontman of American indie rock band Manchester Orchestra, complimented Lacey on being "a very clever songwriter", while guitarist Mike Weiss of mewithoutYou compared the influence of The Devil and God Are Raging Inside Me to that of Nirvana's Nevermind in how it "acted as sort of a pioneering watermark for musical genres that existed in our country", noting how it "broke the barrier [and]... destroyed that entire limitation, that boundary – and that is the importance of this record."

Geoff Rickly, the lead singer of Thursday, recalled how the album musically dwarfed the material his band was making at the same time. "I listened to Devil and God, and I remember about halfway through the third song maybe or fourth song, it just sorta sank on me like a ton of bricks that like, I thought our record [A City by the Light Divided] was a fairly radical change and I was pretty proud of it, and then I heard this absolute masterpiece that was totally different. Basically I was just crushed at how good that record was."

Jason Tate, the founder of music website AbsolutePunk, said that "After Brand New released Devil and God, you’d see all these bands that had been playing pop-punk make their attempt at a rock opus. Usually very badly."

The album's cover art, "Untitled #44" by Nicholas Prior, has been regarded as "iconic". The young girl depicted in the image, four years old when the picture was taken, was seventeen at the time of the record's tenth anniversary. When discussing her opinions on being the subject of such a notable image, Prior answered, "She's seen her likeness in stores, on T-shirts and tattooed on people's arms... while it's always meant something positive to her, I think the significance of it grows and evolves and she does." In a text to Prior, the girl replied, "The album art contributes a lot to the music's meaning, so by simply being in the photo, I feel like I’m contributing to an emotion felt by [their] fans. I consider myself a small part of the vehicle to help people learn more about themselves and what they love, which is a real honor."

In August 2016, Brand New announced that they would be touring the United States in the autumn with Modern Baseball and The Front Bottoms as supporting acts, playing smaller cities and venues that were not covered on the band's summer tour with Modest Mouse. A month later, as the band postponed the release of their unreleased fifth album from 2016 to 2017, they announced that they would be playing the entirety of The Devil and God Are Raging Inside Me on the tour, honoring the tenth anniversary of their most important album.

== Track listing ==
All lyrics are written by Jesse Lacey; all music is composed by Lacey, except where noted.

No.	Title	Lyrics	Music	Length
1.	"Sowing Season"		Vincent Accardi, Lacey	4:31
2.	"Millstone"			4:16
3.	"Jesus Christ"			5:18
4.	"Degausser"		Accardi, Lacey, Brian Lane, Garrett Tierney	5:24
5.	"Limousine (MS Rebridge)"			7:42
6.	"You Won't Know"			5:42
7.	"Welcome to Bangkok"		Accardi	3:05
8.	"Not the Sun"		Accardi, Lacey	3:09
9.	"Luca"			5:08
10.	"–"			2:04
11.	"The Archers' Bows Have Broken"			4:14
12.	"Handcuffs"	Accardi	Accardi	4:10

UK bonus track
No.	Title	Length
13.	"Luca" (Reprisal Version)	4:02

== Personnel ==
Brand New

- Jesse Lacey – vocals, rhythm guitar
- Vincent Accardi – lead guitar, backing vocals
- Garrett Tierney – bass
- Brian Lane – drums, percussion
- Derrick Sherman – keyboards, rhythm guitar, backing vocals

Production and recording

- Mike Sapone – production
- Brand New – production
- Claudius Mittendorfer – recording
- R. Peterson – additional recording
- Rich Costey – mixing
- Emily Lazar – mastering
- Sarah Register – mastering
- L. Wood – A&R

Additional musicians

- Irina Yalkowsky – theremin on "Luca"
- Ron Piscitello – percussion
- Brent Arnold – Cello on "Handcuffs”
- Margaret White – Viola

Art and design

- Jason Noto – art direction and layout
- Morning Breath Inc. – art direction and layout
- Jesse Lacey – photographs
- Brand New – photographs
- Borucki – photographs
- N. Prior – cover
- E. DeAngelis – skeletons

== Charts ==
Chart (2006)	Peak position
Australian Hitseekers Albums (ARIA)	17
Canadian Albums (Nielsen SoundScan)	35
Scottish Albums (Official Charts)	78
UK Albums (OCC)	77
UK Rock & Metal Albums (Official Charts)	7
US Billboard 200	31
US Top Rock Albums (Billboard)	8
US Top Tastemaker Albums (Billboard)	5

Chart (2014)	Peak position
US Vinyl Albums (Billboard)	10

== Certifications ==
Region	Certification	Certified units/sales
United States (RIAA)	Gold	500,000^{‡}
^{‡} Sales+streaming figures based on certification alone.

== Release history ==
Country	Date	Label	Format	Catalog #
United Kingdom	November 20, 2006	Interscope/Tiny Evil	CD (with bonus track)	602517174528
United States	November 21, 2006	Interscope/Tiny Evil	CD	B0008034-02
United States	March 23, 2010	Procrastinate! Music Traitors/ Triple Crown/Interscope/Tiny Evil	double LP	3099-1
United States	September 17, 2010	Academy Fight Song	double LP	B0013946-01
