= Buried by the Buzzzz =

EP by Kevin Devine
- Released: July 7, 2006
- Genre: Indie rock, alternative rock
- Label: These Are Not Records

Kevin Devine chronology
Split the Country, Split the Street (2005)	Buried by the Buzzzz (2006)	Put Your Ghost to Rest (2006)

Buried by the Buzzzz is a 7" EP of remixes of the songs "Buried By the Buzz" and "You Are the Daybreak" from Kevin Devine's album Split the Country, Split the Street (2005), released on July 7, 2006. The record was pressed on 70gm clear vinyl with color labels, a full-color jacket, matte and gloss varnishes; the EP was printed in a hand-numbered limited edition of 450.

Both remixes are by Chris Bracco, who produced Split The Country, Split The Street along with Mike Skinner and Kevin Devine.

This vinyl is currently out-of-print. The remix of "Buried by the Buzzzz" was previously available to stream via the MySpace page for These Are Not Records.

== Track list ==
1. "Buried by the Buzzzz"
2. "The Burst of Blood in My Chest"
