= I Could Be with Anyone =

I Could Be With Anyone

EP by Kevin Devine
- Released: November 2008
- Genre: Indie rock, alternative rock
- Label: Favorite Gentlemen

Kevin Devine chronology
2007 Tour EP (2007)	I Could Be With Anyone (2008)	Live at Looney Tunes (2009)

I Could Be With Anyone is an EP released by Kevin Devine in support of his fifth album, Brother's Blood, and his winter 2008 tour with Manchester Orchestra. The title track is featured on Brother's Blood, while the other 3 tracks are exclusive to the EP. Both "She Stayed as Steam" and "What's Keeping Us Young" were previously available to stream on Devine's MySpace page; however, the EP features a new version of "What's Keeping Us Young".

On June 5, 2009 the video for "I Could Be With Anyone" premiered on Spinner.com, featuring "a series of couples both real and staged in various stages of their relationships".

The title track was later covered by Manchester Orchestra on a split EP with Devine, entitled I Could Be the Only One. Manchester Orchestra's lead vocalist Andy Hull described the song as "an incredibly real and painfully-depressing song", saying "I've loved this tune since the moment I heard it".

A full-band version of "She Stayed as Steam" featured as a bonus track on international versions of Brother's Blood, and were later released as the title track of the She Stayed as Steam EP.

== Track listing ==
1. "I Could Be With Anyone"
2. "The Weather Is Wonderful"
3. "She Stayed As Steam" (Demo)
4. "What's Keeping Us Young"
