= Circle Gets the Square =

Studio album by Kevin Devine
- Released: March 19, 2002
- Genre: Indie rock
- Label: Immigrant Sun Records

Kevin Devine chronology
Circle Gets the Square (2002)	Travelling the EU (2003)

Circle Gets the Square is Kevin Devine's first studio album as a solo artist. It was released in 2002 through Immigrant Sun Records. The songs featured on the album dramatically contrast with those of Miracle of 86, a band in which Kevin was the lead singer and guitarist. Kevin believed that the style and themes of his songs did not represent the band's music well.

The song "Protest Singer" was inspired by a lyric in The Smiths' "Shakespeare's Sister": I thought that if you had an acoustic guitar then it meant that you were a protest singer. Kevin recalled the influence of that lyric on his own work in an interview with Kevin Schachter of youasthedriver.com, to whom he remarked, "...I just used the lyric for a flyer for one of my first solo shows. Then when I thought about it, I realized it was true. Before Dashboard Confessional and all that, everyone associated a guy with an acoustic guitar as being a folk protest singer."

In 2012, the album was pressed on vinyl for the first time by Brookvale Records in collaboration with Enjoy the Ride Records and Kevin himself for the album's tenth anniversary, as well as in response to the album being difficult to find both digitally and physically. The pressing was limited to 750 copies, 250 of which are coloured "Maroon with Black Smoke", an exclusive version on Enjoy the Ride Records' webstore. All of those copies include an internet code for a digital download of the remastered audio of the original album.

== Track listing ==
1. "Fingerprints & Photographs" – 3:43
2. "Write Your Story Now" – 1:39
3. "Protest Singer" – 3:22
4. "Guys with Record Collections" – 3:28
5. "If We Meet Today" – 3:48
6. "This Box Is Empty" – 3:47
7. "Working in Quiet" – 3:39
8. "Letting a Good One Go" – 3:39
9. "Confessional at 6 P.M." – 3:57
10. "Lullaby for a Snow-Faced Girl" – 3:52
