= Make the Clocks Move =

Studio album by Kevin Devine
- Released: October 7, 2003
- Genre: Indie rock
- Label: Triple Crown Records, Defiance Records

Kevin Devine chronology
Travelling the EU (2003)	Make the Clocks Move (2003)	Split the Country, Split the Street (2005)

2010 re-issue cover

Professional ratings
Review scores
Source	Rating
Allmusic	4/5 stars

Make the Clocks Move is Kevin Devine's second studio album. It was released in 2003, making it the first of two albums released on Triple Crown Records. The German record label, Defiance Records, released a double LP set which bundled the album with Devine's following album, Split the Country, Split the Street.

After it had been out of print for a period of time, the album was re-issued by Triple Crown Records on October 12, 2010. The re-issue features new artwork, Devine's own extensive liner notes, and an introductory note by Brand New vocalist Jesse Lacey. The re-issue was also released on vinyl and features two previously unreleased demo tracks from the album's sessions, "Funerals and Carnivals" and "You Knock Me Out".

It is the first of Devine's albums produced by Chris Bracco and Mike Skinner, both of whom would later produce a number of Devine's recordings, including the albums Split the Country, Split the Street and Brother's Blood. Bracco, who is the bassist, and Skinner, who was the drummer, are also members of Devine's band "The Goddamn Band". Mike Skinner previously drummed for the band Miracle of 86, in which Devine was the lead singer and guitarist.

== Track listing ==
1. "Ballgame" – 5:09
2. "Wolf's Mouth" – 3:19
3. "Noose Dressed Like a Necklace" – 4:03
4. "Not Over You Yet" – 2:05
5. "A Flatline Blur" – 3:41
6. "Whistling Dixie" – 2:53
7. "People Are So Fickle" – 3:14
8. "Marie" – 4:01
9. "Country Sky Glow" – 4:00
10. "Longer That I'm Out Here" – 3:52
11. "Tapdance" – 3:55
12. "You're My Incentive" – 2:56
13. "Splitting up Christmas" – 3:26
14. "Thanks" – 3:06
15. "Funerals and Carnivals (Demo)"* - 3:29
16. "You Knock Me Out (Demo)"* - 4:39

* "Funerals and Carnivals" and "You Knock Me Out" are bonus tracks on the 2010 re-issue.
