= I Could Be the Only One =

EP by Manchester Orchestra and Kevin Devine
- Released: January 26, 2010
- Genre: Indie rock
- Label: Favorite Gentlemen

Manchester Orchestra and Kevin Devine chronology
Mean Everything to Nothing (2009)	I Could Be the Only One (2010)

Kevin Devine chronology
Brother's Blood (2009)	I Could Be the Only One (2010)	She Stayed as Steam (2010)

I Could Be the Only One is a split EP by Manchester Orchestra and Kevin Devine released as a digital single on January 26, 2010. The EP features the artists covering each other's songs, with Manchester Orchestra covering "I Could Be With Anyone" and Devine covering "The Only One".

The songs featured on Spinner.com as the "MP3 of the Day" on January 25, 2010 along with an article explaining why these songs were chosen. Devine described "The Only One" as "arguably my favorite", saying that "it's definitely one of the coolest ... The charge of it, the way it explodes out at you. The lyric, the circularity of the bridge, the way the phrases fold over each other". Hull described "I Could Be With Anyone" as "an incredibly real and painfully-depressing song. I've loved this tune since the moment I heard it."

The single was originally planned to be released as a 7" vinyl, but was indefinitely delayed.

== Track listing ==
No.	Title	Writer(s)	Length
1.	"I Could Be with Anyone (performed by Manchester Orchestra)"	Kevin Devine	3:44
2.	"The Only One (performed by Kevin Devine)"	Andy Hull	3:25
