= Another Bag of Bones =

Single by Kevin Devine
- Released: August 19, 2008
- Genre: Indie rock, alternative rock
- Label: Academy Fight Song
- Songwriter: Kevin Devine

Kevin Devine singles chronology
"Another Bag of Bones" (2008)	"'Splitting Up Christmas'" (2009)

"Another Bag of Bones" is a song by Kevin Devine released on August 19, 2008, as a digital EP and a 7" vinyl record, with catalog number AFS.006 on the label Academy Fight Song. It includes the song "Another Bag of Bones", and a lyrically revised cover of Phil Ochs' "Love Me, I'm a Liberal", inspired in part by the 2008 US presidential election. Brian Shultz of Punknews.org praised the release, describing the two tracks as a "creative renaissance" for Devine. Both tracks were produced by Rob Schnapf.

The title track, "Another Bag of Bones", is a political song, giving voice to personal feelings and metaphors on themes of war, environmental injustices and religion. The lyrics' potent imagery, the crisp and confident vocals, and the subtle layers and swells of instrumentation caught the notice of reviewers. The artist related to SPIN that it is not "a song about politics in any traditional sense". The magazine lauded the absence of heavy-handed rhetoric and political sloganeering, combined with Devine's vocal performance and "tension-building arrangements", as distinguishing the track from a plethora of political songs.

Devine's reworking of the 1966 protest song "Love Me, I'm a Liberal" has updated lyrics touching on contemporary issues such as Barack Obama's candidacy and Hurricane Katrina. It satirizes the hypocrisy and insincerity of liberals' support for war in Afghanistan, systemic racism, corporate hegemony and Obama's mixed messages of "change", "with crocodile tears now being shed for the New York and Iraqi dead while 'Afghanistan got what was coming'". Part of a contemporary current of anti-war and social justice protest from artists such as Patti Smith, Public Enemy and David Rovics, Devine's call-out follows the ironic original in a humorous but scathing recrimination of those who selectively profess liberal ideals - as long as their own self-interest is not threatened. Critical reception of the reimagined counterculture classic was less glowing, but it was still considered a well done and solid effort, with both tracks commanding the listener's attention more strongly than some of Devine's previous efforts.

The vinyl version was available in either transparent blue or red from Academy Fight Song's website, and a black tour edition was also available at shows.

"Another Bag of Bones" was later reworked and appears on Devine's fifth album, Brother's Blood. The version on this single is more stripped down than on Brother's Blood.

A remix of the title track by Trevor Dowdy (of I Married My Highschool Sweetheart, a Favorite Gentlemen labelmate) appears on the She Stayed As Steam EP.

No.	Title	Writer(s)	Length
1.	"Another Bag of Bones"	Kevin Devine	3:05
2.	"Love Me I'm a Liberal"	Phil Ochs, Kevin Devine	4:19

== See also ==
- List of anti-war songs
