= Defiance Records =

Record label

Defiance Records was a record label based in Cologne, Germany, which was the German and European distributor of several American and international post-hardcore and punk bands. The label was founded in 1994 and closed down in 2013.

== Artists ==
=== List of artists that signed with Defiance Records ===
- Alesana
- Alexisonfire
- Ambrose
- As Friends Rust
- The Cable Car Theory
- Clarity Process
- The Coalfield
- The Copperpot Journals
- The Data Break
- Delorean
- Down In Frustration
- Engrave
- Face the Enemy
- Gameface
- Hot Water Music
- Haste
- Hopeful
- It's Not Not
- Joshua
- Jude the Obscure
- Kevin Devine
- Limbeck
- Miracle of 86
- The National Anthems
- Never Surrender
- New End Original
- One Man and His Droid
- Pale
- Portugal. The Man
- Piebald
- Reno Kid
- River City High
- Solea
- Standstill
- The Stereo
- Three Minute Poetry
- Wedekind

== Discography ==
- 1999: Pale Another Smart Move (with Soda Records)
- 2001: Pale Razzmatazz (The Arts at the Sands)
- 2002: Pale How to Survive Chance

== See also ==
- List of record labels
