= Brother's Blood =

Studio album by Kevin Devine
- Released: April 28, 2009
- Recorded: August 2008 at Headgear Studios in Brooklyn, New York
- Genres: Indie rock, alternative rock
- Labels: Favorite Gentlemen, Big Scary Monsters

Kevin Devine chronology
Live at Looney Tunes (2009)	Brother's Blood (2009)	I Could Be the Only One (2010)

Professional ratings
Review scores
Source	Rating
NME	(8/10) (07/18/2009, p.43)

Brother's Blood is the fifth studio album by American indie rock musician Kevin Devine, his first album since 2006 and first release on the Favorite Gentlemen record label.

== Background ==
Throughout the course of 2008, Devine premiered a number of demos via his MySpace page and began adding new songs to his live set. The album was recorded in Summer 2008 at Headgear Studios in Brooklyn, New York.

In an interview in June 2009, Devine listed the topics of the album as "The end of days, a dead dog and his sailor master, hallucinogenic fever dreams, sexual infatuation, vividly imagined infidelity, Irish women, Irish Spring, baby boomers, cold feet, getting responsible, life on life's terms."

== Promotion and release ==
During Devine's November and December 2008 tour with Manchester Orchestra, the I Could Be With Anyone EP was released, featuring two b-sides, a demo and the title track which would be later released on Brother's Blood.

The album was leaked in February 2009, two months before its official release. The leak was so premature that the album's artwork had not yet been finalized. On March 2, 2009, Devine addressed the leak via his MySpace blog.

Devine's first headlining tour was announced in March 2009, the Brother's Blood tour, which ran from April 24 to June 7, 2009. Devine was supported by Brian Bonz & The Dot Hongs, Miniature Tigers, and Sarah Jaffe.

On March 25, 2009, the EPK for Brother's Blood was released via Devine's MySpace.

On June 5, 2009 the video for "I Could Be with Anyone" premiered on Spinner.com, featuring "a series of couples both real and staged in various stages of their relationships." It was directed by Sherng-Lee Huang.

Academy Fight Song (US) and Arctic Rodeo Recordings (Europe) released a limited edition 2xLP for the album in November on colored vinyl, with a laser-etched fourth side. The CD version of the album released by Arctic Rodeo features a bonus track, "She Stayed as Steam", as track 11. This track, along with another unreleased track, "Big Bad Man", also features on the She Stayed as Steam EP.

== Track listing ==
No.	Title	Length
1.	"All of Everything, Erased"	4:36
2.	"Carnival"	6:34
3.	"Another Bag of Bones"	4:15
4.	"Hand of God"	3:54
5.	"Brother's Blood"	7:53
6.	"Fever Moon"	3:23
7.	"It's Only Your Life"	5:55
8.	"Murphy's Song"	4:42
9.	"I Could Be with Anyone"	2:47
10.	"Yr Husband"	4:45
11.	"Tomorrow's Just Too Late"	2:39

== B-sides ==
The I Could Be with Anyone EP features 2 b-sides, "The Weather Is Wonderful" and "What's Keeping Us Young", along with a demo for "She Stayed As Steam".

The She Stayed as Steam EP features 2 b-sides, "She Stayed As Steam" and "Big Bad Man", along with 2 remixes, "Breathe, Breathe Deep ('Hand Of God' RMX by Plosive)" and "Another Bag of Bones (Devastation Of Death RMX by Trevor Dowdy)". "She Stayed As Steam" also features as a bonus track on the German version of the album.

Full-band demos of "Yr Husband" and "Big Bad Man" featured as bonus downloads with the UK release of the album.
