= Kevin Devine =

American musician (born 1979)

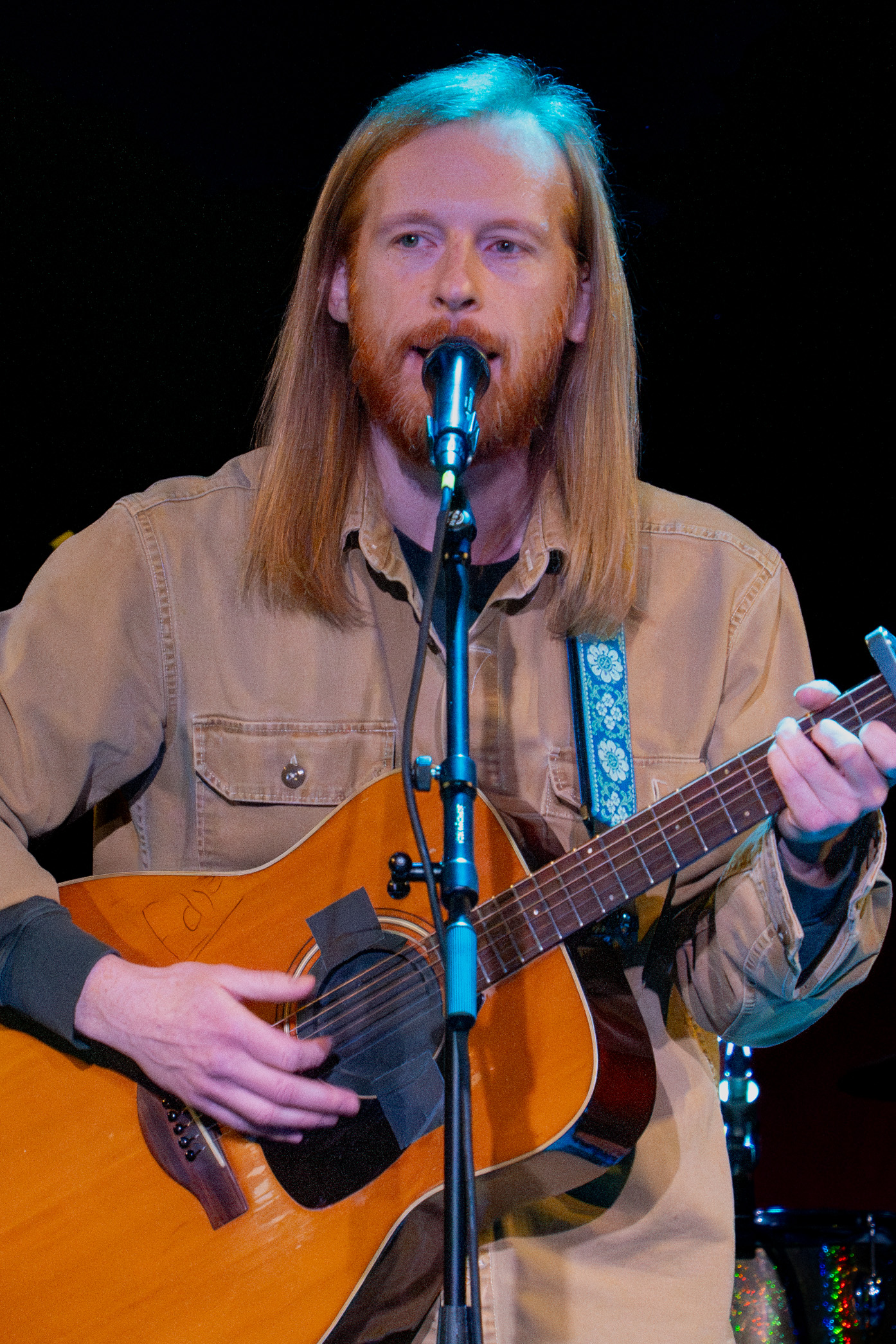
- Devine in 2025

Background information
- Born: December 19, 1979 (age 46); New York City, U.S.
- Origin: New York City
- Genres: Indie rock; folk rock; alternative rock; acoustic; emo
- Occupations: Musician; singer; songwriter
- Instruments: Vocals; guitar; bass; glockenspiel
- Labels: Favorite Gentlemen; Big Scary Monsters; Hobbledehoy Record Co; Academy Fight Song; Procrastinate! Music Traitors; Triple Crown; Defiance; Immigrant Sun; Razor & Tie
- Member of: Bad Books
- Website: kevindevine.net

Kevin Devine (born December 19, 1979) is an American songwriter and musician from Brooklyn and Staten Island, New York City. He is a contemporary member of the underground indie rock and indie folk musical scenes, and his influences range from older indie artists such as Neutral Milk Hotel, Elliott Smith and Pavement to more mainstream and well known acts such as Nirvana and Bob Dylan. In 2013, Kevin Devine rejoined his previous band, Miracle of 86, for a series of reunion shows.

== History ==
=== Beginnings ===
Kevin Devine was born on December 19, 1979 in New York City. He grew up in Brooklyn and Staten Island, and has spent significant time in Manhattan and Queens. Devine graduated from Fordham University at the Lincoln Center in 2001, majoring in journalism and writing for the school newspaper, The Fordham Observer. He first played in the band Delusion, which later changed its name to Miracle of 86 (referring to the 1986 New York Mets). At Fordham he was able to hone his solo, acoustic style by playing at various open-mic and college events. Devine released his first solo album, entitled Circle Gets the Square, in 2002 under the record label Immigrant Sun Records, produced by Bill Manoudakis. During this time he also appeared in regular stints at the Wetlands Preserve venue in New York City.

His brother, Dan Devine, is a columnist for Yahoo! Sports.

=== Increased success (2002–2007) ===
Although still relatively unknown, Devine gained some popularity with his 2003 album, Make the Clocks Move. This album's songs reflect Devine's political views and a growing introspective style, inspired by recent death of his father to a stroke. These two styles would become a staple in Devine's music that followed.

It is the first of two albums released on Triple Crown Records. It is also the first of three albums produced by Chris Bracco and Mike Skinner (ex-Miracle of 86). In 2005, Devine released his third full-length album, Split the Country, Split the Street. He signed with Capitol Records, who released his fourth album, Put Your Ghost to Rest, on October 17, 2006. Only four months after his major label debut, Devine was dropped from Capitol Records due to EMI merging Virgin and Capitol Records.

Devine did several tours with Brand New (who were also formerly signed to Triple Crown Records) during this time period, appearing on their 2004 spring tour, opening for them again in April 2006, and joining their 2007 Spring tour with Manchester Orchestra. Devine also toured solo with Jesse Lacey of Brand New and singer-songwriter Grace Read.

=== Brother's Blood and Bad Books (2008–2010) ===
After negotiations with Capitol Records, Put Your Ghost To Rest was re-released on April 20, 2008, by Procrastinate! Music Traitors. Several new demos were featured on Devine's MySpace page around this time. A majority of the demos would later be properly featured on Brother's Blood and a single for "Another Bag of Bones" was released in August 2008. The tours throughout 2008 were in support of both the Put Your Ghost To Rest re-release and his new material.

In December 2008, Devine announced in an interview with Popwreckoning that his new album Brother's Blood would be released on April 28 on Favorite Gentlemen records. He also announced a tour with Manchester Orchestra and the release of the I Could Be With Anyone EP in support of the upcoming album.

He toured extensively in 2009–2010 for Brother's Blood, including dates with Manchester Orchestra, Brand New, Thrice, and Nada Surf. He also played a number of major music festivals, including Coachella, Lollapalooza, The Bamboozle and Bonnaroo. On July 6, 2010, Devine released the She Stayed As Steam EP, featuring outtakes from Brother's Blood.

In an interview with Manchester Orchestra's Andy Hull, Hull confirmed that Manchester Orchestra and Kevin Devine would be releasing a split EP entitled "I Could Be The Only One". He later confirmed in a January 2010 interview with AbsolutePunk that Manchester Orchestra and Devine had finished a currently untitled album featuring eight songs, with four songs written by Devine and the other four written by Hull. The album was to be released under the band name Bad Books. In August 2010, the band officially announced their self-titled debut album Bad Books would be released on October 19, 2010. A 4-date east coast tour in support of the album was also announced. Another short acoustic tour followed in December 2010, with only Kevin Devine and Manchester Orchestra frontman Andy Hull playing Bad Books songs, as well as solo songs.

=== Between the Concrete and Clouds (2010–2012) ===
On August 26, 2010, Devine announced on his Facebook page that he had begun writing his sixth album. A post made on his Facebook page also revealed tentative song titles which included "Between the concrete & clouds," "The first hit," "Off-screen," "A story, a sneak," "The city has left you," "11–17," "I used to be someone," "Sleepwalking through my life," "Wait out the wreck," and "Merry Levov". (The song "Merry Levov" was possibly renamed "Awake in the dirt", as it does not appear on the album yet would explain the lyrical content of the later renaming.) Several rough draft lyrics of these songs were added to his Facebook notes page. Recording was completed on March 6, 2011. Between the Concrete and the Clouds is the first record made by Devine that is fully backed by a band, featuring musicians Brian Bonz (keyboard), Chris Bracco (a.k.a. Plosive) (bass, keyboard), Mike Fadem (drums, percussion), Russell Smith (electric guitar), and Mike Strandberg (guitar, mandolin). It was recorded in 10 days over a span of a month, produced by longtime collaborator Chris Bracco and mixed by Rob Schnapf.

In March 2011 Devine toured with River City Extension, and released a split 7-inch EP. Devine's songs on the EP are an acoustic version of "Between the Concrete and Clouds" and "Walls", a Tom Petty cover.

Two 7-inch singles, "Luxembourg" and "Part of the Whole", were released on May 17, with the album Between the Concrete and Clouds to follow later in the year.

During an Alt Press interview on July 6, 2011, Between The Concrete and the Clouds was officially announced for a September 13, 2011, release in the US on Razor & Tie/Favorite Gentlemen Records. He performed some of his new material on tour starting in spring 2010. A few songs on the album (most notably "Awake in the Dirt") are influenced by the book American Pastoral by Phillip Roth.

In honor of the 20th anniversary of Nirvana's classic album Nevermind, Kevin Devine covered the entire album, and let fans download it on his website for free.

=== Bubblegum, Bulldozer, Devinyl Splits, and Matter of Time (2012–2016) ===
On January 14, 2013, Devine launched a Kickstarter campaign to help fund his next two albums. Later that day, it was announced the entire goal amount was raised, and on February 28, when the project finished being funded, fans of Kevin Devine had pledged $114,805 (USD). Both albums were released in the United States on October 15, 2013, via Devinyl Records/Favorite Gentlemen/Procrastinate! Music Traitors labels. His seventh studio album, Bulldozer, is a solo album, with Rob Schnapf as collaborator and producer of the album. His eighth studio album, Bubblegum, made with the contribution of his backing band The Goddamn Band, was produced by Jesse Lacey of Brand New.

On January 27, 2015, Devine announced Devinyl Splits, a six-part split series featuring artists such as Matthew Caws, Meridith Graves of Perfect Pussy, and Tigers Jaw to be released on Bad Timing Records. Devinyl Splits No. 1: Matthew Caws x Kevin Devine was released on February 24, 2015, with the remaining five splits released every other month in April, June, August, October, and December.

Matter of Time was released on October 19, 2015, described as, "...a mix between a compilation and live album. The album was recorded by Devine and The Goddamn Band in a 2012 studio session fresh off of extensive touring."

=== Instigator, We Are Who We've Always Been, Social Club, and Matter of Time II (2016–2021) ===
On January 29, 2016, Devine announced that his ninth LP was completed and mastered, to be released on Procrastinate! Music Traitors. On August 8, 2016, Devine announced that his ninth studio album would be called Instigator and that it would be out in the fall. He also announced a fall 2016 US tour with Julien Baker, Pinegrove and Petal to support the record.

On September 13, 2017, Devine announced that he would be joining Brand New as a touring member, playing guitar and singing harmonies for the foreseeable future. He departed after sexual misconduct allegations were raised against Lacey.

On October 20, 2017, Devine released We Are Who We've Always Been, an acoustic version of his 2016 album Instigator.

Devine opened for The Get Up Kids on the first leg of their Fall 2019 tour.

Devine launched a Patreon titled the "Social Club" on April 2, 2020. Three initial tiers were offered, with monthly and annual perks varying by tier, including a cover song, reimagined or new original song, monthly video updates, private concerts on Instagram, sticker sheets, pins, and handwritten lyrics. To kick off the second year of the Social Club, new perks were announced on April 5, 2021.

Tenth anniversary concerts for Brother's Blood and Between the Concrete and Clouds were held in December 2019 and November 2021, respectively. A deluxe edition of Between the Concrete and Clouds was digitally released on October 22, 2021.

Matter of Time II was released on September 19, 2021, recorded in February of the same year. The pre-order included a vinyl option, along with a repressing of the first Matter of Time on vinyl. Devine shared, "We never anticipated the first [Matter of Time] would grow to hold the high place it does in the estimation of so many of you; we hope this one earns its keep and slots neatly at its side."

=== Nothing's Real, So Nothing's Wrong (2022–present) ===
On January 11, 2022, Devine announced his tenth LP, Nothing's Real, So Nothing's Wrong, would be released on March 25, 2022, on Triple Crown Records. The announcement included a pre-order and a release of the album's first single, "Albatross". Devine began a 25-date U.S. tour on April 6, 2022 in support of the new album, supported by Kississippi, Pronoun, and Kayleigh Goldsworthy.

== Discography ==
=== Albums ===
- 2002: Circle Gets the Square
- 2003: Make the Clocks Move
- 2005: Split the Country, Split the Street
- 2006: Put Your Ghost to Rest
- 2009: Brother's Blood
- 2011: Between the Concrete and Clouds
- 2013: Bulldozer
- 2013: Bubblegum
- 2016: Instigator
- 2022: Nothing's Real, So Nothing's Wrong

=== Cover, reimagined, and compilation albums ===
- 2011: Nevermind (Nirvana cover album)
- 2017: We Are Who We've Always Been (reimagined and acoustic version of Instigator)
- 2021: Out In The Ether (cover songs and reimagined original recordings from first year on Patreon; 18 songs on vinyl, 10 songs on digital)
- 2022: Out In The Ether (2021) (cover songs from second year on Patreon; 12 songs on vinyl)

=== Live albums ===
- 2005: Live at Schubas May 13, 2005 (Digital only)
- 2006: Live at Maxwell's August 2, 2006 (Digital only)
- 2007: Live at Austin City Limits Music Festival 2007: Kevin Devine (Digital only)
- 2009: Kevin Devine: Live at Looney Tunes 4.16.09
- 2012: Matter of Time: KD&GDB Tour EP 2012 (Digital only/2015 Vinyl Release)
- 2015: Matter of Time
- 2016: Live At St. Pancras Old Church
- 2020: Daytrotter Sessions: 2008-2015
- 2021: Matter of Time II

=== EPs ===
- 2003: Travelling the EU
- 2006: Buried by the Buzzzz
- 2007: 2007 Tour EP
- 2008: The Schnapf Singles
- 2008: I Could Be with Anyone
- 2010: I Could Be the Only One (split with Manchester Orchestra)
- 2010: She Stayed As Steam
- 2011: Kevin Devine/River City Extension Split
- 2020: Kenny O'Brien & The O'Douls
- 2020: No One's Waiting up for Me Tonight (First released as digital only, later released in June 2021 on vinyl)
- 2021: Out In The Ether Singles (Digital only)
- 2023: neither/nor

=== Devinyl Splits Series ===
(7-inch/digital)

- 2015: No. 1 Matthew Caws x Kevin Devine
- 2015: No. 2 Meredith Graves x Kevin Devine
- 2015: No. 3 Tigers Jaw x Kevin Devine
- 2015: No. 4 Cymbals Eat Guitars x Kevin Devine
- 2015: No. 5 Owen x Kevin Devine
- 2016: No. 6 Jesse Lacey x Kevin Devine
- 2018: No. 7 Craig Finn x Kevin Devine
- 2018: No. 8 David Bazan x Kevin Devine
- 2018: Unplanned Service Changes Worriers x Kevin Devine
- 2018: No. 9 Petal x Kevin Devine
- 2018: No. 10 John K. Samson x Kevin Devine
- 2019: No. 11 Cavetown x Kevin Devine
- 2019: No. 12 The Front Bottoms x Kevin Devine

=== From The Vault & Archival Recording Patreon Series ===
- 2020: Travelling the EU: 2003 (Rerelease, digital only)
- 2021: Live From Pianos: 2004 (Digital only)
- 2021: Bowery Ballroom: April 2004 (Digital only)
- 2021: Live at The Electric Factory: April 25, 2007 (Digital only)
- 2021: Live at The Northstar Bar: December 7, 2008 (Digital only)
- 2022: Mike Daly Demos: 2005 (Digital only)
- 2022: PYGTR Band Demos (Digital only)
- 2022: NRSNW Acoustic Demos (Digital only)
- 2022: 2004 STCSTS Demos (Digital only)

=== Singles ===
- 2007: "Just Stay"
- 2008: "Another Bag of Bones"
- 2009: "Splitting Up Christmas"
- 2011: "Part of the Whole" (7-inch/digital)
- 2011: "Luxembourg" (7-inch/digital)
- 2014: "She Can See Me" (7-inch/digital)

=== Remixes ===
- 2014: "Red Bird (Sombear Remix)"

=== Music videos ===
- 2006: "Brooklyn Boy" (directed by Paxen Films)
- 2006: "Me and My Friends" (directed by Paxen Films)
- 2009: "I Could Be with Anyone" (directed by Sherng-Lee Huang)
- 2009: "Another Bag of Bones"
- 2011: "Off-Screen"
- 2013: "Bubblegum" (directed by Daniel Ralston)
- 2014: "Little Bulldozer" (directed by Jay Miller)
- 2014: "She Can See Me"

=== with Miracle of 86 ===
- 1995: Stages (EP under the band name Delusion)
- 1996: Teenage Unity (EP under the band name Delusion)
- 1998: Render Useless/Miracle of 86 (Split with Render Useless)
- 2000: Miracle of 86 (Fade Away)
- 2001: Kevin Kolankowski
- 2003: Every Famous Last Word
- 2005: Last Gasp (EP)

=== with Bad Books ===
- 2010: Bad Books
- 2012: Bad Books II
- 2013: Daytrotter Session (12-inch/digital)
- 2019: Bad Books III
- 2023: II: Reimagined
