= Jetty Bones =

American indie pop singer-songwriter

- Born: Kelsie Danielle Marie Galluzzo; June 22, 1992 (age 34); Urbana, Ohio, U.S.
- Genres: Indie pop; emo; folk-pop; pop punk
- Years active: 2008–present
- Labels: Take This To Heart; Rise
- Formerly of: Delta Delta!, Midnight Nation
- Website: www.jettybones.com

Kelsie Danielle Marie "Kelc" Galluzzo (born June 22, 1992), known by the stage name Jetty Bones, is an American indie pop singer-songwriter from Urbana, Ohio. Galluzzo released a series of EPs in the 2010s before signing to Rise Records and releasing her debut album, Push Back, in 2021. Her backing band over the years has included Katie Cole of DangerKids, RB Roe of Save Face, and Dylan Mattheisen of Tiny Moving Parts.

== Early life ==
Galluzzo grew up in Urbana, Ohio. She is of Italian, Irish, and Cherokee descent. She had voiced a desire to be an entertainer as early as kindergarten, and in elementary school she kept binders of song lyrics and attempted to start bands with classmates. When she was in the fifth grade, her brother, who was living in California, found her listening to Simple Plan and subsequently sent her albums from punk bands like Blink-182, Misfits, The Clash, and Dead Kennedys, as well as a bass guitar. She wrote her first song on guitar in seventh grade, posted bedroom demos to Myspace, and formed the bands Delta Delta! (later Formulas with Jane Decker) and Midnight Nation with people she had met at local shows. She later recalled Natalie Imbruglia's 1997 hit single "Torn" as the first song she formed an emotional attachment to. She was motivated to seriously pursue music after performing a song she had written about a friend who had committed suicide and subsequently receiving a message from a fan who told her the song had convinced her not to take her own life.

== Career ==
=== 2015–2017: Origins, Crucial States, and Old Women ===
After bouncing around different projects for several years, Galluzzo decided to start a solo project to avoid the risk of losing members and having to start over and began performing as Jetty Bones in 2015. The name Jetty Bones is a spoonerism of Betty Jones, a woman Galluzzo had known who had broken out of an all-girls Catholic school and who espoused the philosophy "If you aren’t happy where you are, you go somewhere else", which Galluzzo saw as encompassing the project's themes of growth and change. She initially performed as a duo with drummer/guitarist Brenna Myers based out of Springfield. Her debut EP, Crucial States, was released independently on March 15, 2016, and was recorded with producer Joe McFaddin. Galluzzo contributed vocals to Tiny Moving Parts' 2016 album Celebrate (she would later do the same on their 2018 album Swell), and frontman Dylan Mattheisen recommended her in an interview with BrooklynVegan.

In May 2017, Galluzzo performed at the second annual Steadfast Festival alongside The Classic Crime, Matt & Toby, and Kids in the Way. In October, she supported The Wonder Years on their Burst & Decay Acoustic Tour alongside Laura Stevenson and The Obsessives. She also did a short tour with Tiny Moving Parts, and in September she opened for Real Friends in Toledo, Ohio. The following month she released her second EP, Old Women, on October 6 through indie label Take This To Heart Records. She recorded the album with producer Greg Lindholm at his Warming House studio and with Mattheisen, who was also featured on the track "Spokes"; Galluzzo had met Mattheisen while touring with Tiny Moving Parts several years prior and he would become a guitarist in her backing band. In December, she performed at a farewell show for the band Runaway Brother in Cleveland alongside McCafferty and Heart Attack Man.

=== 2018–2019: – (hyphen) and signing to Rise Records ===
Galluzzo issued a combined vinyl pressing of Crucial States and Old Women via Take This To Heart in early March 2018. That spring, she toured with Knuckle Puck on a lineup including Free Throw, Hot Mulligan, and Boston Manor. Later in the year, she toured with The Dangerous Summer, The Early November, and Save Face throughout September and October.

On September 14, 2018, Galluzzo released the single "Bringing It Up", which would become the first single from her upcoming EP, – (pronounced "hyphen"). She chose the title to symbolize "something for [the listener] that isn't necessarily written out, just like the title." She once again worked with Dylan Mattheisen to develop the songs and recorded with producer Brett Romnes. A second single, "The Rest Of Them", was released on January 17, 2019, via Alternative Press; noting the irony of releasing the last song on the record as a lead single, Galluzzo said, "The record is about a healing process that got me from one place to another, and I’d rather celebrate where I am now than lead with where I came from." The following month, Galluzzo joined Mat Kerekes' solo tour alongside Jacob Sigman. Two more singles, "'Better'" and "To Know You...", were released in early February, and the EP was released on February 22, debuting on four Billboard charts.

In May and June, Galluzzo performed at the second annual BreakFEST, a festival created by Chad Gilbert and based in Franklin, Tennessee, alongside Gilbert's band New Found Glory as well as Real Friends, Hawthorne Heights, Mae, The Early November, Microwave, H.A.R.D., Love You Later, and Doll Skin. Later that month, Galluzzo joined the 2019 Sad Summer Festival, supporting headliners State Champs, Mayday Parade, The Maine, The Wonder Years, Mom Jeans, Stand Atlantic, and Just Friends alongside fellow supporting acts Grayscale, Worriers, Four Year Strong, Set It Off, Forever the Sickest Kids, and Every Avenue. In November, she joined the second leg of New Found Glory's "From The Screen To Your Stereo To Your Town Tour" alongside Hawthorne Heights and Free Throw.

On November 21, 2019, it was announced that Jetty Bones had signed to Rise Records, an event she commemorated by releasing a music video for "the part:", directed by Michael Herrick, to serve as an ending to the – era. Galluzzo remarked in a press statement that "Growing up in Ohio, we used to have this local scene saying about how the dream was to ‘live in Ohio, start a band, then sign to Rise Records'. Well, 12 years later, I finally get to say that those teenage dreams are a reality."

=== 2020–present: Push Back ===
Galluzzo was scheduled to support Tiny Moving Parts on their spring North American tour alongside Belmont and Capstan in March 2020, but the tour was cut short due to the COVID-19 pandemic; she instead began posting bonus content to her Patreon page. She had also been scheduled to support Stand Atlantic on their North American tour later in the year alongside Trash Boat and Super Whatevr. On October 9, she released a new single entitled "Taking Up Space", produced by John Fields and with an accompanying music video directed by Lindsey Byrnes and Dani Okon. The song was named by Mikael Wood of the Los Angeles Times as one of the 50 best songs of 2020.

On January 22, 2021, Galluzzo released another single and music video, "That's All", which was simultaneously revealed as the second single (after "Taking Up Space") from her upcoming Rise Records debut album, Push Back. She once again worked with Byrnes and Okon for the video. A third single, "Nothing", with a video directed by Mark Eschleman, was released on February 23 via Nylon magazine. Push Back was released on February 26 via Rise Records, with Fields producing and featuring Heart Attack Man's Eric Egan on the song "Bad Time". In August she performed at the Sound Valley Summer Music Festival in Dayton alongside local acts including the Raging Nathans, Nightbeast, and K.Carter.

On March 3, 2023, Galluzzo released a new album, "Songs I Wrote Instead of Killing Myself (The Pandemos)".

On September 8, 2024, Galluzzo released a single, "Rain's Comin'".

== Musical style ==
Galluzzo's music has been variously identified as indie pop and indie rock, pop rock, alternative pop, folk-pop, emo, pop punk, and math rock. Her style and vocals have been compared to Paramore, Alanis Morissette, Halsey, Carly Rae Jepsen, Kacey Musgraves, Tiny Moving Parts, Owen, and Julien Baker.

Galluzzo's sound has evolved over the years. The earliest incarnation of the project was compared to indie rock artists Waxahatchee and Fear of Men. Her early EPs featured a more guitar-heavy alternative rock and pop punk sound, influenced by folk, Midwest emo, and math rock and complemented by bright vocals, catchy hooks, and pop vocal melodies and chord structures. Old Women featured a pop rock sound with elements of pop punk, math rock, and emo revival that drew comparisons to Paramore, Tiny Moving Parts, and early Eisley. Paige Pomerantz of Soundigest compared her vocals on Old Women to Hayley Williams and wrote "If Paramore and Tiny Moving Parts had a child, it would be named Jetty Bones." The – EP saw her sound shift in a more eclectic and electronic direction; "'Better'" utilizes electronic drums and an echoing chorus, "Bringing It Up" combines elements of 1960s pop and punk rock with "melodic, time-warpy vocals" and energized guitars and drums, "To Know You..." incorporates country guitars similar to Kacey Musgraves, and "the part:" concludes with a Siri-delivered monologue. Galluzzo noted that the EP featured more synth and pop elements than her previous work and that it sounded "more like most of what I demo out in my bedroom, the sound I was too nervous to share because I wasn’t sure anyone would listen." She also experimented with new vocal styles on the album, and positive reception to this experimentation gave her the confidence to further push boundaries on future releases.

Push Back saw her sound expand even further, embracing more of a pop focus with elements of alternative country, bluegrass, R&B, hip hop, and synthpop and more emphasis on electronics and piano. Lead single "Taking Up Space" is a country-leaning indie rock/pop punk song reminiscent of Taylor Swift. "That's All" incorporates pop, hip hop, and R&B sounds with a math rock-influenced guitar line and faster sing-rapping vocals that also appear on "Everything" and "Woke Up Crying". "Nothing" is an '80s-inspired synthpop dance song a la Kelly Marie and Tiffany that also utilizes power pop guitars and saxophone (which later reappears on "Ravine"). "Dolly", named for country singer Dolly Parton, is an upbeat bluegrass and country pop track, complete with vocal twang. To promote the album, Galluzzo provided to Alternative Press a playlist of songs that had inspired her while working on the album, which included Laura Branigan's "Gloria", Ben Folds and Regina Spektor's "You Don't Know Me", and The Chicks' "Goodbye Earl", as well as songs from Paramore, Microwave, Mallrat, WHY?, La Dispute, Moros Eros, All Get Out, pronoun, MewithoutYou, Peter Bjorn and John, Annie DiRusso, Catfish and the Bottlemen, Graace, and Matthew Thiessen & The Earthquakes.

=== Lyrics and themes ===
In contrast to her often upbeat sound, Galluzzo's lyrics tend to explore darker themes of abuse, trauma, anxiety, depression, impostor syndrome, and suicidal thoughts. She has stated that "Everything I write comes directly from personal experiences." Discussing the tonal contrast in her music, she said that "We should be able to share and discuss our mental health struggles the same way we’d share good news with someone. That does reflect a lot in the music. There’s really heavy topics underneath the music you want to dance to. Those things in our lives don’t have to be a contrast; they can be things that coexist on a day to day basis.”

Much of her early work was influenced by her past sexually abusive relationship and the isolation she experienced as a result, although in an interview promoting Push Back she said she was "done writing songs about my abuser". Crucial States was written during this period of isolation, while Old Women dealt with themes of relearning how to develop human connections. –, meanwhile, saw her writing take on a darker and more self-reflective tone, through which she sought to continue the themes of vulnerability and seeking connection from Old Women. She stated that she didn't "want people to leave this record thinking that I’m damaged or that recovery is unreachable" and that despite the project's darker themes, "it ends in a much more positive place than it starts."

Following –, Galluzzo noticed that she had been employing a "vague, poetic" style of writing on previous projects and decided she "didn't feel the need to write in analogies and metaphors anymore". On Push Back, the songs "Nothing" and "That's All" deal with internal conflict over a struggling relationship, while "Taking Up Space" expresses Galluzzo's anxiety and impostor syndrome regarding her personal and professional success. The latter half of the album delves into struggles with alcohol abuse and sobriety as well as depression and increasing suicidality; most prominently, the final song "Bug Life" was originally written by Galluzzo as a suicide note and concludes with voicemail recordings of concerned friends and family members attempting to reach her and Galluzzo herself tearfully apologizing. She later said that her decision to include the song wasn't "an act of bravery or me trying to be inspirational by any means. It’s me wanting to show people where I am actually coming from—to help eliminate the idea that I have it all figured out. I’m still human and dealing with this.[..] I shouldn’t be on a pedestal for my recovery.”

== Personal life ==
Galluzzo is pansexual. She affirmed her queer identity on Twitter in March 2020, responding to being identified as an ally by tweeting "My publicly known heteronormative relationships do not mean I’m heterosexual. NOT BY A LONG SHOT," followed by a smile and a rainbow emoji.

Galluzzo is a non-denominational Christian and was raised Catholic. She got her first tattoo, an outline of the state of Ohio behind her left ear, while attending Cornerstone Festival in 2010. In 2014 she reviewed the Bombay Bicycle Club album So Long, See You Tomorrow for the music website Tuned Up. Following the 2021 inauguration of Joe Biden, she participated in the Bernie Sanders mittens meme by tweeting photoshopped images of Sanders on various emo album covers. As of 2021, she works a day job as a barista in Ohio. She is a feminist and has advocated for empowering women and other minorities in the rock scene, in addition to being a mental health advocate.

Galluzzo was previously in a sexually abusive relationship, which she said caused her to feel isolated due to being too ashamed to tell friends and family. The experience has influenced many of her albums and in particular inspired the songs "Innocent Party" from Old Women and ""better"".

Galluzzo has struggled with depression and anxiety most of her life and began attending therapy at a young age. She noted that she was "fortunate enough to be part of a generation where the subject of mental health has become more normalized, but when I was in middle school and high school, that wasn’t an everyday topic of conversation." She experienced an episode of suicidal ideation on New Year's Eve in 2016, fed by loneliness stemming from her abusive relationship, and it was during this that she wrote the song "Bug Life" as an intended suicide note; it later became the final song on Push Back.

== Discography ==
=== Albums ===
- Push Back (2021; Rise)
- “Songs I Wrote Instead of Killing Myself: the Pandemos” (2023)

=== EPs ===
- Crucial States (2016; independent)
- Old Women (2017; Take This To Heart)
- – (2019; Take This To Heart)

=== Singles ===
Year	Song	Album	Label
2017	"No Lover"	Old Women	Take This To Heart
2018	"Bringing It Up"	–	Take This To Heart
2019	"The Rest Of Them"	–	Take This To Heart
2019	"'Better'"	–	Take This To Heart
2019	"To Know You..."	–	Take This To Heart
2020	"Taking Up Space"	Push Back	Rise
2021	"That's All"	Push Back	Rise
2021	"Nothing"	Push Back	Rise

=== Music videos ===
Year	Song	Album	Director
2019	"the part:"	–	Michael Herrick
2020	"Taking Up Space"	Push Back	Lindsey Byrnes & Dani Okon
2021	"That's All"	Push Back	Lindsey Byrnes & Dani Okon
2021	"Nothing"	Push Back	Mark Eschleman
