= Say So (disambiguation) =

"Say So" is a 2019 song by Doja Cat.

Say So may also refer to:

- Say So (album), by Bent Knee, 2016
- "Say So" (Dan + Shay song), 2026
- "Say So" (PJ Morton and JoJo song), 2019
- "Say So", a 2021 song by Masked Wolf

== See also ==
- Say Something (disambiguation)
- "Just Say So", a 2010 song by Brian McFadden featuring Kevin Rudolf
