= Say Nothing =

Say Nothing may refer to:

== Music ==
- Say Nothing (album), or the title track, by Theory of a Deadman, 2020
- "Say Nothing (In the Absence of Content)", a 2020 song by Sharptooth
- "Say Nothing" (Example song), 2012
- "Say Nothing" (Flume song), featuring May-a, 2022
- "Say Nothing", a song by Gabrielle Aplin from the 2017 EP Avalon
- "Say Nothing", a 2021 song by Wes Nelson

== Other uses ==
- Say Nothing (book), a 2019 nonfiction book by Patrick Radden Keefe about the Troubles in Northern Ireland
  - Say Nothing (TV series), a 2024 series by Josh Zetumer, adaptation of the book
- Say Nothing, a 2017 novel by Brad Parks
- Say Nothing (film), a 2001 drama/thriller starring William Baldwin and Nastassja Kinski

== See also ==
- Say Anything (disambiguation)
- Say Something (disambiguation)
