= Bear Your Mind =

Studio album by Free Throw
- Released: May 26, 2017
- Genre: Punk rock, emo, pop punk, post-hardcore, indie rock
- Length: 35:00
- Label: Triple Crown Records
- Producer: Brett Romnes

Bear Your Mind is the second studio album by Nashville punk rock band Free Throw. It was released on May 26, 2017, nearly three years after the band's previous album Those Days are Gone.

== Composition ==
=== Lyrical content ===
According to Castro, Bear Your Mind "picks up where the old record left off." The vocalist explained,

The old record was about a very bad relationship I had in my past. The new record picks up towards the end of that. It deals with the emotional and personal struggles after that relationship and trying to seek my own personal redemption. I was blaming all my problems on that relationship, but I realized I had maybe problems in general I need to figure out.

The album's title is derived from a lyric in the album's seventh track "Andy and I, Uhh...". Discussing the song's lyrics, Castro stated that the song is about of the album his struggles with anxiety and body image. That's where the title comes from. Castro stated "the lyrics flip back and forth between bearing something and mind and being 'bare' in mind", and in his mind it "just fit." He continued, "the album is about carrying the weight of personal burdens so I thought Bear Your Mind just made sense. The album art goes along well. The mannequin holding the television on its shoulder."

=== Music ===
The band's previous album was generally described as a Midwest emo album. Bear Your Mind was noted for its much more refined production value in comparison to its predecessor. Allmusic wrote that the added production value made room for "greater definition and nuance" that allowed the band to "transcend" standard tropes associated with the emo genre.

== Reception ==
AllMusic gave the album an overall favorable review. Despite describing the guitar work as "clever" and the vocals as "solid," he said Bear Your Mind tucks neatly into the emo revival scene.

== Personnel ==
- Cory Castro - lead vocals, rhythm guitar
- Jake Hughes - rhythm guitar, backing vocals
- Lawrence Warner - lead guitar
- Justin Castro - bass
- Kevin Garcia - drums, backing vocals
