= Freak of Nature (Heart Attack Man album) =

Studio album by Heart Attack Man
- Released: May 26, 2023
- Recorded: 2022
- Genre: Pop-punk; emo; alternative rock
- Length: 29:59
- Label: Many Hats
- Producer: Aaron Puckett

Heart Attack Man chronology
Thoughtz & Prayerz (2021)	Freak of Nature (2023)	Joyride the Pale Horse (2025)

Singles from Freak of Nature
- 1. "Freak of Nature" Released: March 16, 2023; 2. "Stick Up" Released: April 13, 2023; 3. "Like A Kennedy" Released: May 4, 2023; 4. "Like A Kennedy (feat. Awsten Knight)" Released: March 29, 2024

Professional ratings
Review scores
Source	Rating
Crucial Rhythm	4/5 stars
Distorted Sound	7/10
Kerrang!	3/5 stars
New Noise Magazine	4.5/5 stars
Punktastic	3.5/5 stars
Square One Magazine	4/5 stars

"Freak of Nature" is the third studio album by Heart Attack Man. The album was released on May 26, 2023 and is the band's first to be released independently, as they had parted ways with Triple Crown Records in 2022. Distribution for the album was done through Many Hats.

"Freak of Nature" also marks the band's final release with bassist Logan McNeal, who made his debut with Heart Attack Man on the "Thoughtz & Prayerz" EP.

== Track listing ==
Freak of Nature track listing
No.	Title	Length
1.	"Practiced in the Mirror"	2:20
2.	"Freak of Nature"	3:23
3.	"Like a Kennedy"	3:05
4.	"Late to the Orgy"	3:56
5.	"Stick Up"	2:38
6.	"God Called Off Today"	2:34
7.	"C4"	2:14
8.	"9 On Your Bedside"	3:24
9.	"Clown School"	3:30
10.	"See You On the Other Side"	2:52
Total length:		29:59
