= Fake Blood (album) =

Studio album by Heart Attack Man
- Released: April 19, 2019
- Recorded: Q3 2018
- Studio: The Barber Shop (Hopatcong)
- Genre: Pop-punk; Midwest emo; grunge; slacker rock
- Length: 31:32
- Label: Triple Crown
- Producer: Brett Romnes; Heart Attack Man

Heart Attack Man chronology
The Manson Family (2017)	Fake Blood (2019)	Thoughtz & Prayerz (2021)

Singles from Fake Blood
- 1. "Fake Blood" Released: March 1, 2019; 2. "Out for Blood" Released: April 5, 2019

Fake Blood is the second studio album by American pop punk band, Heart Attack Man. The album was released on April 19, 2019, on Triple Crown Records.

== Critical reception ==
Professional ratings
Review scores
Source	Rating
The Alternative	5/5 stars
God Is in the TV	7/10
Spinning Thoughts	4/5 stars

Fake Blood was well received by contemporary music critics upon release. Steve Spithray, writing for God Is in the TV gave the album a seven out of 10 rating saying the album "plays out as a musical link between Hüsker Dü and Sugar and no bad place to be going forward." Tyra Brunz gave the album four stars out of five saying that Fake Blood has an "unrivaled, authentic creativity and DIY mentality seems to suggest big things on the horizon for Heart Attack Man."

== Track listing ==
All tracks are written by Eric Egan.

Fake Blood track listing
No.	Title	Length
1.	"Fake Blood"	3:19
2.	"Blood Blister"	2:58
3.	"Low Hanging Fruit"	1:13
4.	"Out For Blood"	2:55
5.	"Rats in a Bucket"	2:55
6.	"Moths in a Lampshade"	3:00
7.	"Cut My Loses"	2:43
8.	"Crisis Actor"	2:26
9.	"Asking for It"	2:03
10.	"Sugar Coated"	3:20
11.	"The Choking Game"	3:46
Total length:		31:32

== Personnel ==
Credits adapted from the album's liner notes.

=== Heart Attack Man ===
- Eric Egan – performance, production, album artwork
- Adam Paduch – performance, production
- Seamus Groman – performance, production
- Tyler Sickels – performance, production

=== Additional contributors ===
- Brett Romnes – engineering, mixing, production
- Mike Kalajian – mastering
- Courtney Emery – album artwork, photography, layout
