= DKY =

DKY may refer to:

- DKY, ICAO airline code for Servicios Aéreos Elite
- D.K.Y., track in Strange Doings in the Night by Sarah and the Safe Word
- DKY, short name for FC Dynamo Kyiv
