= Bliss (EP) =

EP by A Will Away
- Released: March 20, 2015; October 23, 2015
- Recorded: January 2015
- Studio: Maximum Sound Studios
- Genre: Alternative rock
- Length: 15:49
- Label: Quiet Fire Media; Triple Crown Records
- Producer: Gary Cioffi

A Will Away chronology
A Will Away/Head North Split EP (2014)	Bliss (2015)	Here Again (2017)

Singles from Bliss
- 1. "Cheap Wine" Released: March 3, 2015; 2. "My Sitter" Released: October 13, 2015

Bliss is the third EP from American modern rock band A Will Away. It was released by Quiet Fire Media on March 20, 2015, and re-released by Triple Crown Records on October 23, 2015. The EP is considered the band's breakthrough record, setting in motion a series of events that led to Triple Crown Records signing them in August 2015.

== Background ==
At the beginning of 2014, the band had yet to garner the attention of any major record label despite positive reviews for their recently released EP, Cold Weather, and two earlier releases. Shortly before the end of the previous year, the band signed with new record label Giant MKT and spent much of 2014 on tour with label-mates Head North.

At the same time, however, they also were working to craft another full-length album they hoped would launch a new phase in their career. After many months of writing, however, the project was abandoned. According to bassist John McSweeney, "We had a record we were writing for a really long time that we hated so we scrapped [it]. The Bliss EP kinda just happened."

The band felt pressure to release new music quickly. They began writing new material in December 2014. The next month, they arrived at Maximum Sound Studios in Danvers, Massachusetts, where they worked with producer Gary Cioffi to put together the EP in three weeks.

== Release ==
The band released the EP's first single, "Cheap Wine," on AbsolutePunk on March 3, 2015. A week later, they released a second single, "My Sitter," on UnderTheGunReview.net. On March 17, the full EP and a music video for "Cheap Wine" were released exclusively on AbsolutePunk before CD and digital sales started March 20.

Shortly after the EP's release, the band was approached about supporting a major tour and conversations began with Triple Crown Records weeks after that. The label announced on August 31, 2015, that they had signed the band and would be re-releasing the EP on October 23, 2015.

The EP's second music video, "My Sitter," was released October 13, 2015.

== Reception ==
Professional ratings
Review scores
Source	Rating
Already Heard	3.5/5
New Noise Magazine	Favorable
Punktastic	Favorable
UnderTheGunReview.net	9/10

The EP has received generally positive reviews from critics. Punktastic's Dave Bull described it as "emotive" and "energetic," but also said it "comes abound with an edgier warmth and an unplugged style chorus that gives that 'hands round a hot chocolate feeling' from the get go." UnderTheGunReview.net's John Bazley strongly praised the release, saying the band "has left behind the constraints and tropes of the pop-rock genre and crafted an impressive, atmospheric release that truly captures their rare sense of identity."

New Noise Magazine's Joseph Tucker wrote that it is "a great step in the right direction," noting "the band has progressed quite a bit sonically and lyrically in terms of maturity and tone." In a review for Already Heard, Rob Mair said "there's little new to be heard on Bliss, but there's also plenty to like about it," citing "a rawness" that "sets them apart from their peers."

== Track listing ==
No.	Title	Length
1.	"Play Dead"	2:57
2.	"My Sitter"	3:28
3.	"Cheap Wine"	2:52
4.	"10 or 11"	2:50
5.	"Be Easy"	3:42
Total length:		15:49

== Personnel ==
A Will Away

- Matthew Carlson – lead vocals, rhythm guitar
- Collin Waldron – lead guitar, backing vocals
- John McSweeney – bass guitar
- Sean Dibble – drums

Production

- Gary Cioffi – production, engineering, mixing
