= Here Again (A Will Away album) =

Studio album by A Will Away
- Released: March 3, 2017
- Recorded: January–February 2016
- Studio: Maximum Sound Studios
- Genre: Alternative rock
- Length: 33:17
- Label: Triple Crown Records
- Producer: Gary Cioffi

A Will Away chronology
| Bliss (2015) | Here Again (2017) | Soup (2019) |

Singles from Here Again
- 1. "Here Again" Released: February 3, 2017; 2. "Gravity" Released: June 23, 2017

Here Again is the second studio album from American modern rock band A Will Away. It was released March 3, 2017, and is the band's first full-length release on Triple Crown Records.

== Background ==
Following the success of their breakthrough EP, Bliss, the band returned to producer Gary Cioffi's Maximum Sound Studios in Danvers, Massachusetts to begin recording their first full-length album on Triple Crown. The band previously recorded Bliss with Cioffi and now wanted to create a "companion piece" that built on the sound of the EP. According to lead singer Matthew Carlson, Bliss and Here Again were designed to be played together, saying "You can listen to the beginning of Bliss through the end of Here Again and it's complete."

The band arrived at the studio in late 2015, where they spent "5-6 weeks" on pre-production. They spent three weeks recording the album in early 2016.

== Release ==
In December 2016, it was announced the band would be supporting Moose Blood, Trophy Eyes and Boston Manor on a North American tour in February and March 2017. This tour became their platform for promoting the new album from coast to coast.

The band released the album's first single and music video, "Here Again," on February 3, 2017. They followed that by releasing the LP's penultimate track, "Into The Light," exclusively to Uproxx on February 23, 2017. The album was released March 3. The band released the album's second single and music video, "Gravity," on June 23, 2017. Later in the year, they embarked on two more U.S. tours, supporting This Wild Life and Dryjacket on the first and Have Mercy, Boston Manor and Can't Swim on the second.

== Reception ==
Professional ratings
Review scores
| Source | Rating |
|---|---|
| Alternative Press | Favorable |
| chorus.fm | Recommend |
| Kerrang! | Mixed |
| New Noise Magazine | 4/5 stars |
| Punktastic | Favorable |
| Soundfiction | Favorable |
| The Alternative | 8/10 |

The album has received generally positive reviews from critics. In its favorable review of the album, Alternative Press called the band "the future of this genre, plain and simple," describing the LP as "their most diverse, calculated release yet" and "a craft of meticulous intent." Writing for Billboard, Jenna Romaine said the band is "living up to" its self-description as "eighties pop rock on acid," with "a slew of memorable riffs, conceptual videos, and relatable lyrics that range from the everyday to transcendental." The Alternative described the release as "less of an album and more a collection of seemingly effortless offerings that actually were a calculated endeavor," saying it "paints with the colors of palettes from Third Eye Blind, Moose Blood, and Taking Back Sunday but it is a masterpiece all on of its own."

Punktastic's Chris Hilson offered overwhelming praise, saying it is "rare for a debut album to feel this well-rounded, making it almost impossible to find fault with any part of Here Again." Soundfiction wrote that while Bliss "showcased [the band's] more negative view of life," this album "takes this nihilistic approach and turns it into a positive as the band comes to terms that while maybe nothing really matters, it's best to make the most out of life," adding that it "makes for a great debut album."

chorus.fm's Aj LaGambina called it a "solid debut full length," adding it "could probably do with some more uptempo songs, but live, many of these songs will pick up the pace." New Noise Magazine's Nicholas Senior gave it four out of five stars, calling it "comfortable, wistful, introspective, and just a tad nostalgic," but felt the songs "run together by the album's end." Kerrang!'s Hannah Ewens wrote that "at times it's overbearing, with every musical part competing, but at their best, when they pull back, the songs have the potential to soar." She concludes by saying "it doesn't always work, but A Will Away are a touch more thoughtful than a lot of others doing this."

== Track listing ==
| No. | Title | Length |
|---|---|---|
| 1. | "Here Again" | 2:22 |
| 2. | "Pay Raise" | 2:59 |
| 3. | "Agoraphobia" | 2:25 |
| 4. | "Chemicals" | 1:31 |
| 5. | "Crochet" | 2:34 |
| 6. | "Well-Adjusted" | 2:25 |
| 7. | "Caroline" | 2:42 |
| 8. | "Better Reluctant" | 3:12 |
| 9. | "Summon Your Savior" | 1:45 |
| 10. | "The Shakes" | 2:15 |
| 11. | "Gravity" | 3:11 |
| 12. | "Into The Light" | 2:33 |
| 13. | "Something Special" | 3:23 |
| Total length: | | 33:17 |

== Personnel ==
A Will Away

- Matthew Carlson – lead vocals, rhythm guitar
- Collin Waldron – lead guitar, backing vocals
- John McSweeney – bass guitar
- Sean Dibble – drums

Production

- Gary Cioffi – production, engineering, mixing
