= Super American =

American emo band

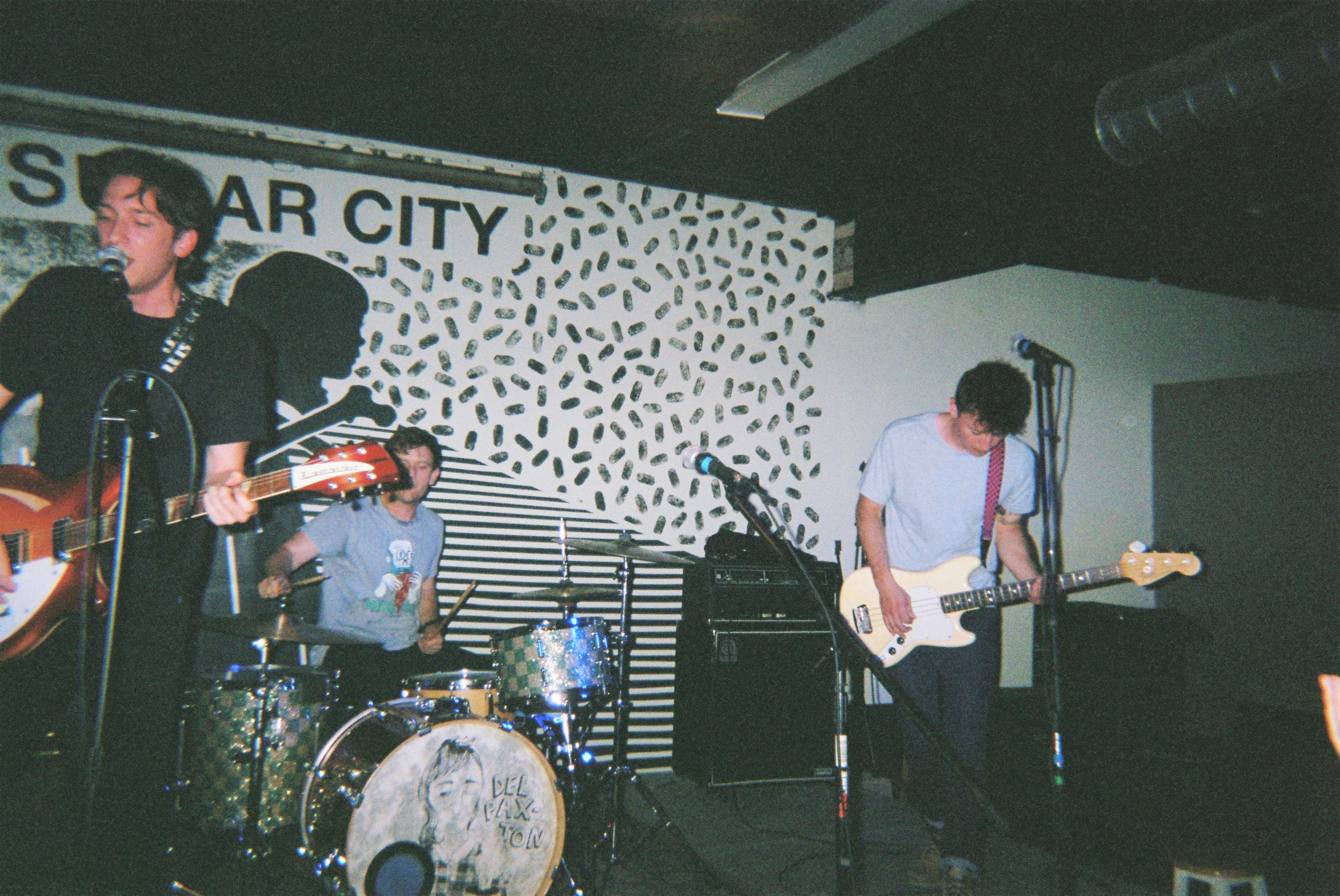
- Feeley (left), McClure (center), Cox (right) performing at Sugar City in Buffalo, NY in June 2017.

Background information
- Origin: Buffalo, New York
- Genres: Pop punk, slacker rock, emo, power pop
- Years active: 2016–2025
- Labels: Wax Bodega, Take This to Heart Records
- Past members: Matt Cox; Pat Feeley

Super American was an American pop punk band from Buffalo, New York.

== History ==
In late 2015, Matt Cox released the track “Garden Face” under the name Super American, marking the project's earliest musical output prior to the official formation of the band in 2016. Super American was formed in 2016 by Matt Cox and Pat Feeley. The band first released Disposable on April 7, 2017, on Take This To Heart Records. While continuing to build their fan base, the band began demoing songs which would ultimately become Tequila Sunrise, which was properly recorded in the early spring of 2018 at GCR Audio in Buffalo, NY. Subsequent to the release of Tequila Sunrise's lead singles, "Hands Down Olivia", "Givin' It Up", and "Chris From Walmart", the band embarked on their first national tour in the summer of 2018, along with Gleemer and Kississippi, supporting Have Mercy on a 5-year album anniversary tour.

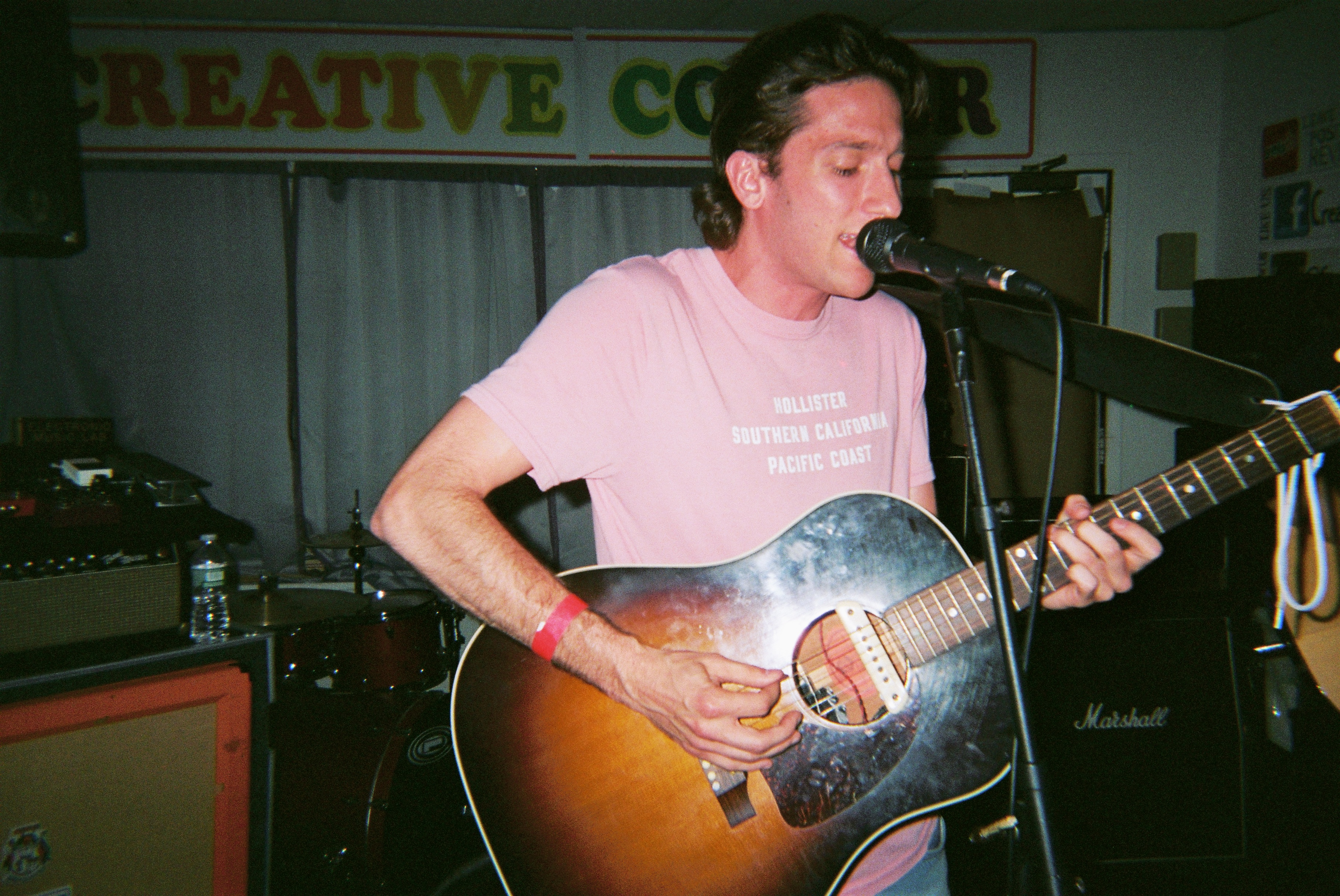
Feeley serenading the crowd while the band performed a stripped down set on Long Island, NY in 2017

The band would later release YOBWOC on January 18, 2020. The band was due to support Hot Mulligan on their 2020 tour, but it was cancelled due to the COVID-19 pandemic. The band released the song Why We're in the Streets featuring Albany based Young Culture on August 13, 2020, with all proceeds benefiting Candles In The SUN.

On August 11, 2021, the band released the single free bird from their second album SUP, which released on October 22, 2021, on Wax Bodega. The band promoted the album by touring with bands including Hot Mulligan, Belmont, and Mom Jeans before eventually launching a headlining tour in October 2022 with Young Culture and Arm's Length, as well as opening for Heart Attack Man in 2023.

On April 10, 2024, the band released Hopefully Pitchfork Doesn't Hear This, as the first single of their third and final record Gangster of Love, releasing on May 31, 2024, again with Wax Bodega. The band then embarked on a headlining tour with support from Sydney Sprague and Summerbruise. On September 18, 2024, the band suddenly canceled the final dates of their headlining tour, citing personal issues as the reason. The band was also due to support Neck Deep on their US tour, but on October 1, 2024, the band cancelled their appearances on that tour.

The bands official social media pages went silent following the tour cancellations. On May 2, 2025, Cox commented on the radio silence on an Instagram post promoting a new project June at the Apollo with Hot Mulligan guitarist Chris Freeman, claiming that the band has disbanded following their last concert before the tour was cancelled, although there has been no official announcement from the band about their status.

== Band members ==
=== Members ===
- Matt Cox (2016–2025)
- Patrick Feeley (2016–2025)

=== Touring and session Members ===
- Daniel McCormick
- Aidan Licker
- Liam Ebers
- Jeffery Grabowski
- Elliot Douglas
- Fred Cimato
- Greg McClure
- Tom Falcone
- Benjamin Leiber
- Steven Gardner
- Sam Checkoway

== Discography ==
Studio albums

- Tequila Sunrise (2018, Take This To Heart Records)
- SUP (2021, Wax Bodega)
- Gangster of Love (2024, Wax Bodega)

EPs

- Disposable (2017, Take This To Heart Records)
- YOBWOC (2020)
