= Riverby (band) =

American indie rock band from Philadelphia, Pennsylvania

- Origin: Philadelphia, Pennsylvania
- Genres: Indie rock; punk rock; pop punk; power pop; emo
- Years active: 2018–2023 (hiatus)
- Labels: Take This To Heart
- Spinoff of: The Tisburys
- Members: August Greenberg; Tyler Asay; Doug Keller; Mol White; GT Fiordaliso
- Past members: Dan Nazario
- Website: riverbyphl.com

Riverby is an American indie rock band from Philadelphia, Pennsylvania. Formed in 2018 by lead singer August Greenberg and guitarist Tyler Asay, the band released an EP, The Guide To Oversharing (2019), before signing to independent label Take This To Heart Records in 2020 and releasing their debut album, Smart Mouth. A second album, Absolution, was released in 2022. Riverby have performed alongside acts including Chris Gethard, Mannequin Pussy, and The Front Bottoms, and have been featured by WXPN and BrooklynVegan.

== History ==
=== 2018–2020: Formation, signing, and Smart Mouth ===
Singer-songwriter August Greenberg, who moved to Philadelphia from South Jersey in 2015, had written songs since the age of 11 and performed at open mic nights. While working as a door-to-door salesperson in Philadelphia, Greenberg met co-worker and guitarist Tyler Asay, already a member of local band The Tisburys, and attended an open mic night he hosted where the two played together. They eventually recruited Tisburys bassist Doug Keller, and Riverby played its first show at Dawson Street Pub on April 20, 2018.

The band released its first single, "Last December", in February 2019, followed by the EP The Guide To Oversharing in June; the EP was produced by Asay and mastered by Justin Nazario. When a planned drummer for the single "Maybe" failed to make the recording session, Nazario brought in his brother, Dan Nazario, also a Tisburys member, who impressed Greenberg and became the band's official drummer. A music video for "The Truth", a track on the EP, was released on August 16. Greenberg later described the EP as a "glorified demo" but acknowledged its positive impact on their songwriting.

In March 2020, Riverby released a new single, "The Tell Tale Heart", with the announcement that a debut album entitled Smart Mouth, produced by Justin Nazario, was forthcoming. Another single, "Nose to Nose", was included by NPR Music on a playlist of "The Best New Songs You Missed In 2020". In June, it was announced that Riverby had signed to Take This To Heart Records, and that Smart Mouth would be released there on July 10. A third single, the title track "Smart Mouth, was issued before the album's release, and a music video for the song was released in October.

Also in October, Riverby appeared on No Bad Words for the Coast Today, a covers compilation in tribute to Rilo Kiley's The Execution of All Things, alongside artists including Sad13, Mannequin Pussy, Adult Mom, Lisa Prank, Eric Slick, and Diet Cig. The following month, they released an acoustic EP, Three sad love songs & a cover, which featured three original songs and a cover of "Kyoto" by Phoebe Bridgers. In December, they appeared on the No Sleep Records compilation EP No Sleep Til Christmas 8 (2020), alongside Geoff Rickly, Michael Malarkey, and Sarah and the Safe Word.

=== 2021–present: Absolution and hiatus ===
In early 2021, Riverby released a charity cover of "Walk Through The Fire" from the Buffy the Vampire Slayer episode "Once More, with Feeling"; proceeds were donated to the Coalition for Black Trans Economic Liberation. They also appeared on compilations including Eat the Rich: a Gossip Girl Soundtrack Cover Compilation, where they covered LCD Soundsystem's "New York I Love You But You're Bringing Me Down"; With Love: A Benefit for the Lilith Fund, covering Tal Bachman's "She's So High"; and One-derful!: A Compilation of One-Hit Wonders, covering Duncan Sheik's "Barely Breathing". In November, Riverby toured in support of singer-songwriter John-Allison Weiss.

In February 2022, the band released the single and music video "Baseless" and announced their second album, Absolution, recorded with producer Jim Wirt (Fiona Apple, Something Corporate). "Baseless" was included in BrooklynVegan's 12 Best Punk Songs of February 2022, which described it as "both full of purpose and extremely catchy". A second single, "Birth By Sleep", was released later in the month. In early March, they opened for comedian Chris Gethard's New Jersey is the World live show in Asbury Park and released a new single, "Chapel". Absolution was released on March 25, 2022, via Take This To Heart. That same week, they opened Shamir's album release parties for Heterosexuality, at Milkboy in Philadelphia and The Sultan Room in Brooklyn. Performing at a Key Studio Session for WXPN in May, the band performed with a six-person lineup including Greenberg, Asay, Keller, Mol White on keyboards, guitarist/vocalist Jeanette Lynne (formerly of Best Bear), and drummer GT Fiordaliso. They also opened for The Front Bottoms at a show at White Eagle Hall. In August, the band appeared on A Monument To Commemorate Our Time, a Take This To Heart tribute to the Bright Eyes album Lifted, where they were featured alongside John-Allison Weiss, Dan Campbell, and Rat Tally, among others.

A music video for "Birth By Sleep" premiered on October 13. That same month, the band performed at the Philly Music Fest alongside Mt. Joy, Mannequin Pussy, Empath, Low Cut Connie, Ron Gallo, Screaming Females, Shamir, and Saleka. They also joined The Fest 20 in Gainesville, Florida, headlined by Hot Water Music, Anti-Flag, The Flatliners, Samiam, The Bouncing Souls, and Piebald; Riverby performed alongside War on Women and Dog Party.

The following month, they and Bacchae supported the band Catbite at a Saint Vitus show presented by BrooklynVegan. They were also announced to play The Front Bottoms' Champagne Jam festival in December, alongside Joyce Manor, Soul Glo, Kevin Devine, Titus Andronicus, Prince Daddy & The Hyena, Emperor X, Tom May of The Menzingers, Shane Henderson of Valencia, Another Michael, Sweet Pill, and Slothrust.

On February 4, 2023, the band announced an indefinite hiatus to begin on March 4, with Greenberg citing mental health and burnout.

== Musical style and lyrics ==
Self-described as "bubblegum grunge", Riverby are mainly associated with alternative/indie rock, punk rock, pop punk, emo, power pop, pop rock, and occasionally folk. They have been compared to artists including Charly Bliss, Rilo Kiley, Paramore, Jimmy Eat World, and The Beths, while August Greenberg's vocals have been compared to those of Frances Quinlan, Jim Adkins, and Pat Benatar. For their part, the band have cited influences including Hop Along, Mannequin Pussy, The 1975, Alanis Morissette, Liz Phair, Garbage, Modest Mouse, Fleetwood Mac, Indigo Girls, Barenaked Ladies, Paramore, Mayday Parade, All Time Low, My Chemical Romance, Third Eye Blind, Fall Out Boy, Yellowcard's "Ocean Avenue", and The Get Up Kids. At early jam sessions, Greenberg and guitarist Tyler Asay would play covers of songs by The Beatles and MGMT.

The band's first EP, The Guide To Oversharing, was musically influenced by Belle and Sebastian, Foster the People's 2010 hit "Pumped Up Kicks", Arctic Monkeys, The Fratellis, Death Cab for Cutie, and Best Coast, with Greenberg particularly citing the latter's use of surf guitar melodies as an influence on "Fault Line". For Smart Mouth, Asay's guitar work was inspired Joe Reinhart of Hop Along and Algernon Cadwallader, while the title track was written to sound like The Get Up Kids. Other artists who influenced the album included Hop Along, Mannequin Pussy, Alanis Morissette, The 1975, Garbage, Modest Mouse, and PJ Harvey. Lead single "The Tell Tale Heart" features fuzz guitar and synthesizers a la Charly Bliss, while "Out of Tune" is a slower and more spacious song with echoing xylophone and vocal harmonies.

For their follow-up Absolution, new producer Jim Wirt encouraged the band to record guitars chord by chord, while Greenberg sought to preserve the unpolished vocals of their live performances. The album also saw the band combining emo and punk with elements of 1980s rock music. Lead single "Baseless" is a more aggressive song, with an alt-rock guitar groove one reviewer compared to "Magic Man" by Heart (Greenberg described it as "basically 'I Love Rock 'n' Roll' with the weirdest riffs in between") building into a punk rock breakdown on the chorus. "The Moon" is an indie rock song featuring millennial whoops similar to those of Andrew McMahon (whom Wirt had also produced for). "Birth By Sleep" is a peppier indie punk song in the vein of Diet Cig and early Sleater-Kinney; Greenberg cited Fall Out Boy, Blink-182, and Kississippi as inspirations for the song. "Burn Yr House Down" combines punk rock with elements of cabaret, while "Say It" has elements of progressive rock and "Heavy To Hold" features harmonies and dreamy guitar leads reminiscent of Mazzy Star. The record also features acoustic ballads like "Chapel", while final track "Imagine The Ending" is a seven-minute song with orchestral elements that, according to Adam Grundy of ChorusFM, " builds to a crescendo that would make Phoebe Bridgers proud."

=== Lyrics and songwriting ===
Riverby's songs typically deal with relationships and personal insecurity, often from a feminist perspective. Smart Mouth was described by John Vettese of WXPN as "perfect for screaming at the mistakes of your younger self while cautioning your future self against falling into similar patterns." Lead single "The Tell Tale Heart" is written as a letter to Greenberg's past self in the wake of heartbreak, while "Nose to Nose" is about pushing past self-doubt, and the title track chronicles a destructive relationship with an undercurrent of kink-driven control and submission; Greenberg described the song as being about "reclaiming sex and taking back control of what they thought they once lost after a traumatic experience." "The Giving Tree" uses its titular metaphor to describe an unbalanced relationship, "Out of Tune" is a more measured and patient exploration of a lost love, and closing song "In My Dreams" bids farewell to a difficult past relationship. Many songs on the album were inspired by literature; in addition to Edgar Allan Poe's "The Tell Tale Heart" and Shel Silverstein's The Giving Tree, other songs on Smart Mouth were inspired by the 2005 adaptation of Jane Austen's Pride and Prejudice, Sylvia Plath's The Bell Jar, and by Greek mythology.

Absolution was originally conceived as a concept album themed around tarot cards, but ultimately shifted to an exploration of religion; according to by Greenberg, the album is "about ending fear with mortality and finally coming to solutions with your shit, closing the door on things that have been festering: your history and yourself, and making peace with God. I don’t even believe in God, but on the off chance He’s fucking real, I’d like us to be cool.” The album follows a thematic journey from post-traumatic catharsis to self-acceptance and healing. Lead single "Baseless" deals with Greenberg's experience of sexual assault and imagines taking violent revenge on an abuser. Another single, "Birth By Sleep", is a refutation of the Manic Pixie Dream Girl and nice guy tropes; Greenberg described the song as being about "how much of a shared experience it is for non-men to find themselves at the center of someone's fantasies and projection." Elsewhere on the album, "Burn Yr House Down" uses Andrew Garfield's monologue from the film The Social Network to introduce a song about getting revenge on an ex-lover, while ballads like "Say It" and "Chapel" are more tender explorations of failed relationships. Andrea Quinn of Left of the Dial described closing track "Imagine The Ending" as "a real love song to community" and noted its use of enjambment and unexpected internal rhyme.

== Advocacy, politics, and philanthropy ==
Riverby have often advocated for progressive social causes. In 2020, during the George Floyd protests, all proceeds from Smart Mouth and the EP Three sad love songs & a cover were donated to bail funds, the former through ActBlue. On Instagram, the band shared a list of Black artists for fans to support, posted educational resources on systemic racism and defunding the police, and called for the resignation of Philadelphia mayor Jim Kenney, who had approved the use of CS gas to disperse peaceful protestors.

Following the 2021 Atlanta spa shootings, Riverby expressed support for the Stop Asian Hate movement as well as sex workers' rights. In February 2022, responding to news of legislation directed at LGBT youth in Florida and Texas such as the Don't Say Gay bill, lead singer August Greenberg, who is openly non-binary and bisexual, wrote on Twitter that "if i can throw my hat into the ring of any of these problems, i hope to god a kid somewhere who might be closeted or anything can listen to my shit and find joy with another queer person who is rooting for them always." Greenberg also expressed opposition to Republican candidate Mehmet Oz during the 2022 Pennsylvania gubernatorial election.

The band has also regularly appeared on compilation albums benefitting various organizations, including G.L.I.T.S., a New York City-based transgender advocacy organization; the national food bank network Feeding America; the indigenous Sogorea Te Land Trust in the San Francisco Bay Area; the Lilith Fund, a reproductive rights non-profit; the Chris Atwood Foundation, which provides resources for substance abuse recovery; and the National Multiple Sclerosis Society. Additionally, Greenberg co-organized Sad Songs for Dirty Covers, a compilation of The National covers to which Riverby contributed and which benefitted the transgender homelessness organization House of Tulip.

== Members ==
=== Current ===
- August Greenberg – lead vocals, guitar
- Tyler Asay – guitar
- Doug Keller – bass guitar
- Mol White – keyboards, vocals
- GT Fiordaliso – drums

=== Former ===
- Dan Nazario – drums

== Discography ==
=== Albums ===
- Smart Mouth (2020; Take This To Heart)
- Absolution (2022; Take This To Heart)

=== EPs ===
- The Guide To Oversharing (2019)
- Three sad love songs & a cover (2020)
- Riverby on Left of the Dial Live (2021)

=== Singles ===
- 2019: "Last December"
- 2019: "Maybe"
- 2020: "Nose to Nose/The Tell Tale Heart"
- 2020: "Smart Mouth"
- 2021: "Walk Through The Fire"
- 2022: "Baseless"
- 2022: "Birth By Sleep"
- 2022: "Chapel"

=== Music videos ===
Year	Song	Director	Album
2019	"The Truth"	Bob Sweeney	The Guide To Oversharing
2020	"Smart Mouth"	Zoe Heller	Smart Mouth
2022	"Baseless"	Andrew Silverman	Absolution
2022	"Birth By Sleep"	Andrew Silverman	Absolution

=== Compilation appearances ===
Year	Album	Song	Label	Notes
2020	No Bad Words for the Coast Today: The Execution Of All Things Covers Comp	"Emotional"	Until Crickets Guide You Back	Tribute to Rilo Kiley's The Execution of All Things; Benefitted the transgender advocacy organization G.L.I.T.S.
2020	No Sleep Til Christmas 8 EP	"I Wish It Was Christmas Today"	No Sleep Records	Compilation of Christmas covers; Benefitted Feeding America
2021	Eat the Rich: a Gossip Girl Soundtrack Cover Compilation	"New York I Love You But You're Bringing Me Down" (LCD Soundsystem cover)	Precious Bitch	Compilation of songs from the Gossip Girl soundtrack; Benefitted the Sogorea Te Land Trust
2021	With Love: A Benefit for the Lilith Fund	"She's So High" (Tal Bachman cover)	Refresh Records	Benefitted the Lilith Fund
2021	Sad Songs for Dirty Covers: A Compilation of The National Covers for House of Tulip	"No One Else Will Be There"	Heavenly Creatures Records	Co-organized by Riverby; The National tribute album; named for The National's Sad Songs for Dirty Lovers; Benefitted the trans homelessness organization House of Tulip
2021	One-Derful!: A Compilation of One-Hit Wonders	"Barely Breathing" (Duncan Sheik cover)	Something Merry	Compilation of one-hit wonder covers; Benefitted the Chris Atwood Foundation
2022	A Monument To Commemorate Our Time: A Tribute To Lifted by Bright Eyes	"You Will. You? Will. You? Will. You? Will."	Take This To Heart Records	Tribute to Bright Eyes' Lifted or The Story Is in the Soil, Keep Your Ear to the Ground; Benefitted the National Multiple Sclerosis Society
