= A Will Away =

American rock band

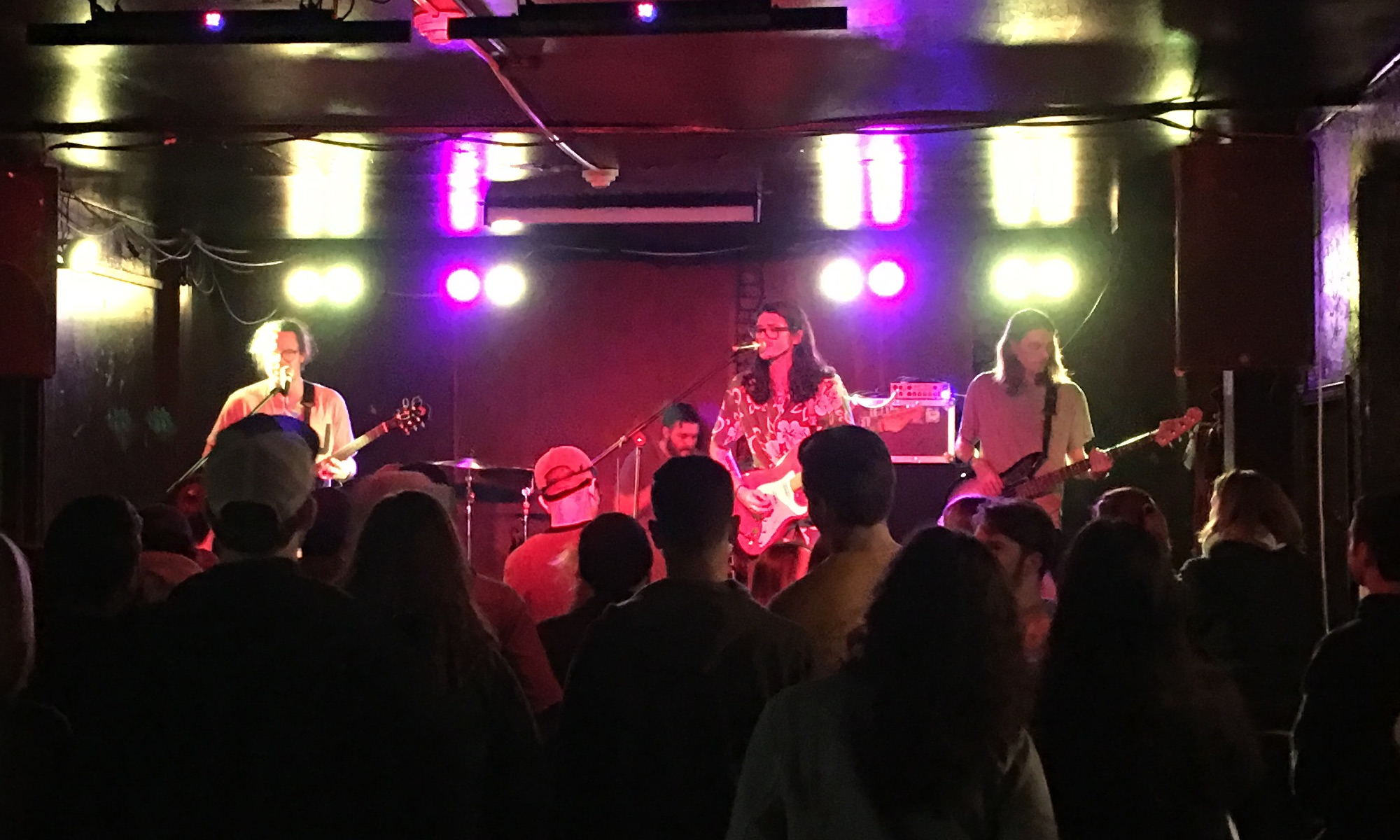
- A Will Away performing in December 2018. From left to right: Collin Waldron, Sean Dibble, Matthew Carlson, John McSweeney.

Background information
- Origin: Naugatuck, Connecticut, USA
- Genres: Alternative rock, pop rock, pop punk
- Years active: 2011–present
- Labels: Triple Crown Records; Rude Records
- Members: Matthew Carlson; Sean Dibble; John McSweeney
- Past members: Collin Waldron; Ryan Cool; Aaron Johnson; Paul Beladino; Manuel Fonseca

A Will Away is an American modern rock band formed in 2011 in Naugatuck, Connecticut. The band's original five members all lived within a mile of each other growing up, forming the band while in high school. Their name is a play on words from their shared philosophy, "Where there's a will, there's a way." They are currently signed to Rude Records.

Starting off in the DIY music scene a self-described "cookie-cutter pop-punk" band, the band calls their current sound "eighties pop-rock on acid," which Billboard describes as being characterized by "a slew of memorable riffs, conceptual videos, and relatable lyrics that range from the everyday to transcendental."

The band self-released a full-length album and two EPs before signing in 2013 with Giant MKT, their first record label. In 2015, they released their breakthrough EP, Bliss, on Quiet Fire Media, which led to the band signing with Triple Crown Records. The label re-released Bliss on October 23, 2015. Their first full-length album on Triple Crown, Here Again, was released March 3, 2017. Their sophomore EP on Triple Crown, Soup, was released November 20, 2019.

== History ==
=== Formation and Not Far From Home (2011–2012) ===
A Will Away formed in February 2011 under the name Sunday Is My Weekend. They released their first single, "Save a Life (Live Through Someone Else)," in May 2011. It peaked at No. 2 on PureVolume's pop-punk chart. They released a second single, "So Long Live This and This Gives Life To Thee," in June 2011. They changed their name to A Will Away in July 2011, saying their original name felt like a "church band" and was "genre-restrictive."

Later that year, the band issued a limited-release, four-track acoustic demo called The Beautiful Zero in August. That release was quickly followed in September by their first EP, Not Far From Home. Upon release of the EP, the band successfully entered several contests, including the chance to play the 2012 Vans Warped Tour date in Hartford, CT. The band's bassist, Aaron Johnson, left in the summer of 2012 after moving to Florida.

=== Product of Your Environment and Cold Weather (2012–2014) ===
Following the release of Not Far From Home, A Will Away turned to Kickstarter to fund the production and release of their first LP, Product of Your Environment. It exceeded their initial goal of $2,500.00. Product of Your Environment was released in December 2012.

In 2013, the band added bassist John McSweeney. Later that year, they collaborated with The Stolen on an acoustic split EP, which was released in September.

The band released their second EP, Cold Weather, in December 2013. The release introduced a more alternative rock sound to the band and a departure from the pop punk sound of POYE and NFFH. It was well received by critics, with one reviewer stating, "The lyrical content of this album is the best it’s ever been for A Will Away, radiating passion and honesty through every word. Even if you haven’t personally experienced what the band describes in a given song, I guarantee you’ll feel like you understand them completely."

Within days of releasing Cold Weather, the band signed with new record label Giant MKT. They ended the year by releasing a Christmas-themed split EP with Cross Town Train. The band toured for much of 2014, including a co-headlining tour with Giant MKT label-mates Head North during the summer, which resulted in a split EP being issued by both bands. Guitarist Ryan Cool left the band in 2014.

=== Bliss, Here Again and Soup (2015–present) ===
In a year filled with touring, the band carved out time to write and record what they hoped would become their second LP. However, after months of work, they were dissatisfied with what they had produced and scrapped a nearly complete album. They began writing new material for an EP in December and recorded it over a three-week period in January 2015. At the same time, the band signed with Quiet Fire Media, a new record label founded by members of Head North.

Less than two months after it was recorded, Bliss was released in March 2015. Critics were quick to note and applaud the maturity and tone progression found in the record's instrumentation and lyrics. The band credits the release as a critical point in their career, attracting the attention of Triple Crown Records, which signed the group and re-released the EP under their own label. The band released an acoustic EP, More Bliss, in December 2015.

With major label backing for the first time in their careers, the band headed back into the studio to record their first full-length label release. Here Again was released by Triple Crown in March 2017 and the band immediately went on tour supporting the album alongside Moose Blood, Trophy Eyes, and Boston Manor. The album received strong praise from critics for its textured sound, lyrical complexity and emotional depth. The Alternative said the album "paints with the colors of palettes from Third Eye Blind, Moose Blood, and Taking Back Sunday but it is a masterpiece all of its own." During the Here Again record cycle, A Will Away continued supporting the record by touring with bands such as This Wild Life, The Dangerous Summer, Save Face amongst many other bands in the genre.

The band recorded selections from Here Again in a live acoustic session, which they released as Hear Again in May 2018. Later in the year, they slowed their touring to focus on opening their own recording studio and art center, called Steadfast Studios, in Naugatuck, CT.

Using their new hometown studio, the band recorded their sophomore EP on Triple Crown, Soup, and released it in November 2019. The EP received positive reviews, with one reviewer calling it "a refreshing take to the generic pop-punk sound." The band has announced plans to continue touring in 2020, with the possibility of new music before year's end as well.

In December 2020 the band signed with Rude Records.

== Members ==
Current Members
- Matthew Carlson – lead vocals, rhythm guitar (2011–present)
- Sean Dibble – drums, mixed percussion (2011–present)
- John McSweeney – bass, backing vocals (2013–present)
- Brendan Machowski - lead guitar, backing vocals (2021–present)
Former Members
- Collin Waldron – lead guitar, backing vocals (2011–2020)
- Ryan Cool – rhythm guitar, backing vocals (2011–2014)
- Aaron Johnson – bass, backing vocals (2011–2012)
- Paul Beladino – *touring* guitar, backing vocals (2017)
- Manuel Fonseca – lead guitar, backing vocals (2020-2021)

== Discography ==
=== Studio albums ===
- Product of Your Environment (self-released, 2012)
- Here Again (Triple Crown Records, 2017)
- Stew (Rude Records, 2022)

=== EPs ===
- Not Far From Home (self-released, 2011)
- Cold Weather (Giant MKT, 2013)
- Bliss (Quiet Fire Media 2015, Triple Crown Records 2015)
- More Bliss (Triple Crown Records, 2015)
- Hear Again (Triple Crown Records, 2018)
- Soup (Triple Crown Records, 2019)

=== Split EPs ===
- The Stolen/A Will Away Acoustic Split (Mayflower Collective, 2013)
- A Will Away/Cross Town Train Christmas Split (Mayflower Collective, 2013)
- A Will Away/Head North Split (Giant MKT, 2014)

=== Music videos ===
Year	Title	Director
2014	"Dusk/Transparent People"	
2015	"Cheap Wine"	Taylor Rambo
2015	"My Sitter"	Eric Teti
2017	"Here Again"	Eric Teti
2017	"Gravity"	Eric Teti & Sam Gursky
