= Soup (EP) =

EP by A Will Away
- Released: November 20, 2019
- Studio: Steadfast Studios
- Genre: Alternative rock
- Length: 16:16
- Label: Triple Crown Records
- Producer: Dominic Nastasi

A Will Away chronology
Here Again (2017)	Soup (2019)

Soup is the sixth EP from American modern rock band A Will Away. It was released on November 20, 2019, on Triple Crown Records.

The band recorded the EP at Steadfast Studios in Naugatuck, Connecticut, a multimedia recording studio and art center they constructed in their hometown in 2018. For two weekends during the production of the EP, they invited fans to join them in the studio while recording. Throughout the year, the band teased the EP's release with numerous photos and videos of the band with soup.

It received generally positive reviews from critics. Writing for Uproxx, Zac Gelfand said the release shows that the band's "outlook is a bit more positive, making for a series of tracks about getting better, combining rock, indie, and pop influences into a unique blend of modern rock music." He named it one of the best indie releases of the week. In a review for CHARMMusic Magazine, Ali Prato called it "a standout closing to 2019 music" that offers "a refreshing take to the generic pop-punk sound, with underlying chill tones." She noted the sound is a departure from their previous releases, calling it "completely unique in its presence."

== Track listing ==
No.	Title	Length
1.	"Settling"	2:07
2.	"Soft Shell"	2:54
3.	"Sea Hag Blues"	2:29
4.	"Evaporate"	3:24
5.	"TOIFMG"	2:20
6.	"Long Exposure"	3:02
Total length:		16:16

== Personnel ==
A Will Away

- Matthew Carlson – lead vocals, rhythm guitar
- Collin Waldron – lead guitar, backing vocals
- John McSweeney – bass guitar
- Sean Dibble – drums

Production

- Dominic Nastasi – production, engineering, mixing
- Mike Kalajian – mastering
