= Take This to Heart Records =

American independent record label

- The official logo for Take This to Heart Records
- Founded: 2012; 14 years ago
- Founder: Joe Urban
- Distributor: Alternative Distribution Alliance
- Genre: Indie rock; pop punk; emo; post-hardcore; alternative rock
- Location: Boston, Massachusetts
- Official website: takethistoheartrecords.com

Take This to Heart Records, sometimes abbreviated as TTTH or T3H, is an American independent record label.

== Overview ==
Take This to Heart Records was founded by Joe Urban in Boston, Massachusetts in 2012. Prior to founding the label, Urban toured with bands and worked at Zing Recording Studios in Westfield, Massachusetts; it was at Zing where he was inspired to start a label for smaller artists. The name came from a brainstorming session where Urban reportedly said, "I really want people to take these records to heart." Urban drew influence from labels like Saddle Creek, Vagrant, Drive-Thru, and Asian Man Records. Since January 2017, the label has had a distribution deal with Alternative Distribution Alliance, a subsidiary of Warner Music Group.

The label has released records by artists including Bent Knee, The Higher, McCafferty, Save Face, Jetty Bones, and Super American. Their roster includes artists in alternative rock, punk rock, post-hardcore, pop rock, power pop, and emo.

In 2022, the label released the compilation album A Monument To Commemorate Our Time: A Tribute To Lifted by Bright Eyes, a collection of covers from the band Bright Eyes' album Lifted or The Story Is in the Soil, Keep Your Ear to the Ground. Contributors to the album included John-Allison Weiss, Dan Campbell of The Wonder Years, Rat Tally, Riverby, and Sarah and the Safe Word, and proceeds were donated to the National Multiple Sclerosis Society.

== Artists ==
=== Current ===
- Baby Fuzz
- Bad Luck.
- Barely Civil
- Bent Knee
- Boys Go To Jupiter
- City Mouth
- Future Teens
- Girl K
- The Higher
- Kali Masi
- Lilith
- M.A.G.S.
- ManDancing
- Marigold
- Palette Knife
- PONY
- Riverby (on hiatus)
- Snarls
- The Sonder Bombs
- Super American
- Telethon
- Thanks! I Hate It

=== Alumni ===
- Arrows Over Athens
- Cheer Up
- Dead Leaves
- Fossil Youth
- Hodera
- Home Movies
- Jetty Bones
- McCafferty
- Ness Lake
- No Tide
- The Other Stars
- Rat Kid Cool
- Sarah and the Safe Word
- Save Face
- Sundressed
- Swordfish
- Traditions
- Tranquility
- Western Daughter
- Woodford Way
