= Small Towns Burn a Little Slower =

American emo/rock band

Small Towns Burn A Little Slower
- Origin: Saint Paul, Minnesota, U.S.
- Genres: Punk, Emo, pop
- Years active: 2002–2008
- Labels: Dead Letter Records; Triple Crown Records; Rise Records
- Past members: Tommy Rehbein; Danny Wolf; Ryan Traster; Joel Trowbridge; Josh Mckay; Sean Carey; Jeff McIlvenna; Luke Alison
- Website: Official website

Small Towns Burn a Little Slower was a band from St. Paul/Minneapolis, Minnesota.

The band was established in the summer of 2002. Early on with Jeff McIlvenna on vocals and Luke Allison on bass, they recorded and released the Holding On to What's Killing You EP in 2003 on Dead Letter Records. After a line-up change (the departure of Jeff and Luke and the addition of Danny and Ryan), much touring, and label negotiations, they recorded and released the Small Towns Burn a Little Slower EP in 2004 on Rise Records.

On July 26, 2005, they released their first album, Mortality as Home Entertainment, on Triple Crown Records. Alternative Press called them one of the "100 Bands You Should Know About" in 2005.

On November 6, 2007, the band announced on their MySpace page that they will be breaking up as of February 2008. They cited school, marriage and burnout brought on by the music industry as the reasons. The band released their final album, So Begins the Test of a Man (Dead Letter Records) at their farewell concert.

== Discography ==
- Holding On to What's Killing You (2003)
- Small Towns Burn a Little Slower (2004)
- Mortality as Home Entertainment (2005)
- There's No Place Like Minneapolis (Split 7-inch with The Cardinal Sin) (2006)
- So Begins The Test Of A Man (2008)
