= Bent Knee =

American rock band

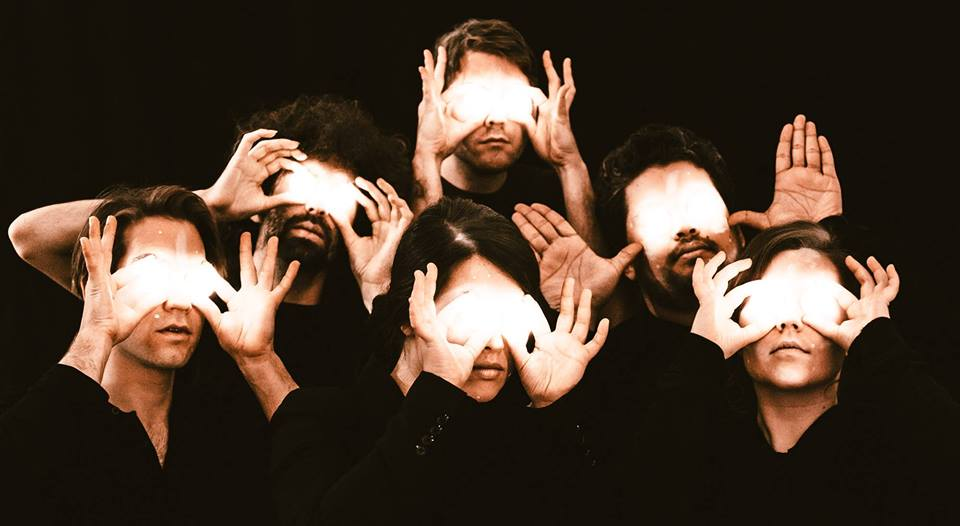
- 2016 promotional image

Background information
- Origin: Boston, Massachusetts, U.S.
- Genres: Art rock; avant-garde; baroque pop
- Years active: 2009–present
- Labels: Inside Out; Sony; Cuneiform; Take This to Heart
- Members: Courtney Swain; Gavin Wallace-Ailsworth; Chris Baum; Vince Welch
- Past members: Ben Levin; Jessica Kion
- Website: bentkneemusic.com

Bent Knee is an American art rock band formed in Boston, Massachusetts, in 2009. The band performs in multiple genres and draws from multiple influences, including pop, industrial rock, progressive rock and avant-garde. The band is known for unpredictable dynamic contrast and the wide vocal range of its singer, Courtney Swain.

Bent Knee has toured with The Dillinger Escape Plan, Haken, Leprous, Thank You Scientist, and Mike Keneally. In 2016, the band signed to Cuneiform Records for the release of its third album, Say So. In 2017, the band signed a deal with Inside Out Music and released a fourth album, Land Animal.

== History ==
Bent Knee was formed at the Berklee College of Music in 2009, when the guitarist Ben Levin and the vocalist Courtney Swain began writing music together. The band's name is a compound of the founders' names ("Ben" + "[Cour]tney").

The band self-released its first LP, Bent Knee, in 2011, and self-released a follow-up, Shiny Eyed Babies, in 2014. In late 2015, the band was signed to Cuneiform Records, an American independent record label, on which Say So was released in 2016. In April 2017, the band was signed by Inside Out Music for the release of a fourth album, Land Animal, which was released June 23, 2017. A fifth album, You Know What They Mean, was released in October 2019 also by Inside Out Music. In November 2021, a sixth album, Frosting, was released by Take This To Heart Records.

An early mix of the song "These Hands" from the album Land Animal was used as free content for Rock Band 4 Rivals in March 2017.

In May 2022, it was announced that Ben Levin and Jessica Kion would leave the band.

On August 30, 2024, the band released the album Twenty Pills Without Water on Take This to Heart Records.

== Members ==
Current

- Courtney Swain – lead vocals, keyboards, bass
- Gavin Wallace-Ailsworth – drums
- Chris Baum – violin, backing vocals, guitar
- Vince Welch – synthesizers, guitar, bass

Former

- Ben Levin – guitars, backing vocals (2009–2022)
- Jessica Kion – bass, backing vocals (2009–2022)

== Discography ==
Studio albums

- Bent Knee (2011)
- Shiny Eyed Babies (2014)
- Say So (2016)
- Land Animal (2017)
- You Know What They Mean (2019)
- Frosting (2021)
- Twenty Pills Without Water (2024)
