= Sarah and the Safe Word =

American cabaret rock band from Atlanta, Georgia

- Origin: Atlanta, Georgia, United States
- Genres: Dark cabaret; alternative rock; pop-punk; emo; gothic rock
- Years active: 2015–present
- Labels: Take This To Heart, Say-10
- Spinoff of: Go Robo Go; Ravens and Wolves
- Members: Sarah Rose; Kienan Dietrich; Beth Ballinger; Maddox Reksten
- Past members: Brandon Ward; Anna Messick; Jason Abarca; Sam Freeman; Courtney Varner; Susy Reyes; Carlos Gonzalez
- Website: sarahandthesafeword.com

Sarah and the Safe Word is an American rock band based in Atlanta, Georgia. Formed in 2015 by lead singer Sarah Rose and guitarist Kienan Dietrich, the band's current lineup also includes keyboardist Beth Ballinger and bassist Maddox Reksten. The band has frequently collaborated in the studio and performed live with percussionist Jeff Matthews (since 2023) and violinist Leica Wilde (since 2025). They are known for their theatrical 1920s cabaret-inspired style, eclectic blend of genres and influences, and affiliation with and advocacy for the LGBT community and other marginalized groups.

On the strength of their debut album, Strange Doings in the Night (2017), Sarah and the Safe Word were invited by Warped Tour founder Kevin Lyman to perform at that year's festival; they have since toured with acts including Motionless in White, The Birthday Massacre, and Dog Park Dissidents. After signing to independent label Take This To Heart Records, the band released their second album, Red Hot & Holy (2019), followed by Good Gracious! Bad People in 2020. In 2022, the band issued a remastered version of Strange Doings in the Night via Say-10 Records. In 2023, the band released their fourth album, The Book Of Broken Glass.

In 2026, the band self-released their fifth album, The Disappearing Girl.

== History ==
=== Formation and Afterlife (2015–2017) ===
Sarah and the Safe Word was formed in Atlanta, Georgia in 2015. Lead singer Sarah Rose and guitarist Kienan Dietrich had known each other from the local music scene as members of the bands Go Robo Go and Ravens and Wolves. After Go Robo Go disbanded, Rose, believing her music career was over, moved to Washington, D.C. for a year. She returned to Atlanta and formed Sarah and the Safe Word, initially intending it as an occasional solo project before Dietrich convinced her to make it a full band. The band name is a reference to the practice of safewords in the BDSM community, which Rose is openly involved in.

The project's first EP, Afterlife, was produced by Lee Jennings and released in late 2015, preceded by the single "Sugar in My Veins". The following year, the EP was re-released in February, and the band released two singles, "The Supernova" and a cover of Soft Cell's "Tainted Love".

=== Strange Doings in the Night (2017–2018) ===
While the EP was primarily recorded with Rose, Dietrich, and bassist Brandon Ward, for their 2017 debut album, Strange Doings in the Night, the pair brought in a number of session musicians to flesh out the sound, many of whom became official members, including violinist Susy Reyes, keyboardist Beth Ballinger, and viola player Courtney Varner. The album was produced by Emarosa's Bradley Walden and released on March 28, 2017. The album was brought to the attention of Warped Tour founder Kevin Lyman, who invited the band to perform at the tour's Atlanta stop in 2017. Shortly before the tour, Maddox Reksten, who had performed gang vocals on the album, was made the band's official bassist.

That same year, the band performed at Southern Fried Queer Pride, as one of several acts chosen to replace Pwr Bttm following that group's removal for misconduct allegations. In August, they released a music video for the song "The Louisville Shuffle (R.I.P.)". A coastal Florida tour in September was planned but ultimately cancelled due to Hurricane Irma. In October, they performed at Center Stage in Atlanta as part of Motionless in White's Graveyard Shift Tour, appearing alongside Miss May I and The Amity Affliction.

=== Signing and Red Hot & Holy (2018–2019) ===
In January 2018, the band released a cover of Eurythmics' "Sweet Dreams (Are Made of This)". The following July, they appeared in an episode of The CW series The Originals, performing at the wedding of characters Freya (Riley Voelkel) and Keelin (Christina Moses). In September, the band released a music video for the single "Red Hot and Holy". Inspired by Mark Romanek's work with Nine Inch Nails, Raúl Gonzo's work with Pvris, and The Dangerous Summer's video for "Work in Progress", the video depicted each of the now-seven-member band as one of the seven deadly sins. The following month, they released a new EP of the same name on October 26 and hosted a Halloween Ball in Marietta, Georgia with local bands Fable Cry and The Keepsake.

In February 2019, the band released a cover of "Face My Fears" by Hikaru Utada and Skrillex, originally from the Kingdom Hearts III soundtrack. On May 16, 2019, it was announced that Sarah and the Safe Word had signed to independent label Take This To Heart Records. Rose said that, while the band had been cautious about signing to a label, Take This To Heart had "given us a bigger platform to create what we’ve been creating for a long time now. They haven’t had their fingers in the pie, and we can continue doing what we’ve been doing." The announcement was accompanied by a new single and music video, "Formula 666", the lead single of an upcoming album Red Hot & Holy (which added three new songs to the previous EP). Marvin Doyital of Alternative Press included the single in "10 new songs you need to hear this week", praising it as a "cheeky punk banger" that was "proof that [the band] mean serious business".

The album, recorded with producer Aaron Pace, was released on May 24 through Take This To Heart. Rose described the album as "the full realization of the process of discovery that we started with SDITN" due to better incorporating "the overall theatricality of the band", while Dietrich noted that new producer Pace "helped us learn which aspects of the recording need to stay grounded so we can put maximum weirdness into the aspects that don’t." The following month, the band performed at Augusta Pride.

=== Good Gracious! Bad People. (2019–2021) ===
The band began work on a new album, entitled Good Gracious! Bad People., in October 2019, recording with producer Jim Wirt (Fiona Apple, Something Corporate) in Cleveland, Ohio and planning for a March or April 2020 release. In January 2020 they released the single "You're All Scotch, No Soda", a new single and music video teased as the beginnings of a new album. However, due to the COVID-19 pandemic in March 2020, the album's release was delayed, and the band took a hiatus from touring. In April, they released a cover of Fountains of Wayne's "Mexican Wine".

Despite the album delay, a second single, "Sick on Seventh Street", was released in May, with The Alternative describing the video as "like walking into a hazy bar, there’s something slightly off that keeps you coming back." The album's official lead single, "The Last Great Sweetheart of the Grand Electric Rodeo", was released in August; Adam Grundy of ChorusFM described the song as "encapsulating everything that this band is capable of creating when they are firing on all creative cylinders". Three more singles, ""Something is Afoot on Old Man McGrady's River", "Bottom of a Bender", and "When Oskar Fische Comes To Town", were issued before Good Gracious! Bad People. was finally released on October 30, 2020 via Take This To Heart. The album was positively reviewed; Grundy wrote that the band "appear poised to take the next dramatic leap into the limelight as their new record delivers all over the board", while Cole Faulkner of The Punk Site wrote "If Good Gracious! Bad People. doesn’t become a runaway breakout success, then something is seriously wrong with the music industry today".

On June 19, having had no permanent drummer for several years, the band announced via Instagram that Carlos Gonzalez had become the band's official drummer. The band said in a statement: "In the past several months, we’ve been lucky enough to get to know and play with Carlos Gonzales. To know Carlos is to know his kindness, friendship, and creativity. It’s not easy to come into a group of six people who know each other well and find your own voice within it, but Carlos has become a part of our family."

In December, Sarah and the Safe Word appeared on the No Sleep Records compilation EP No Sleep Til Christmas 8, contributing the song "Prancer's Night Off" alongside artists like Geoff Rickly, Michael Malarkey, and Riverby.

=== Strange Doings re-issue (2021–2022) ===
On July 30, 2021, the band released a new standalone single, "Lost Ring on Riverside". The song was reportedly inspired by Rose seeing a poster for a lost wedding ring while walking down Riverside Drive in Manhattan. The same day as the single release, the band played a show in Brooklyn, their first since the beginning of the pandemic. In December, they released another standalone single entitled "Solstice", which features gang vocals from 19 guest vocalists including Zac Xeper of Dog Park Dissidents.

In February and March 2022, the band toured nationally with Dog Park Dissidents, V Is For Villains, and Gilt. They also supported The Birthday Massacre on their tour with Julien-K. In May, Rose, performing solo as the Sarah Rose Project, opened for musician Will Wood on his "In Case I Die" Tour. That same month, the band released a third single, "Flowers", with reports that they would begin recording a new album the following month. In June, for Pride Month, the band contributed their previous cover of "Mexican Wine" to the Say-10 compilation Never Erased, where they appeared alongside Dog Park Dissidents and other queer artists. The band also appeared on the Take This To Heart compilation album A Monument To Commemorate Our Time, a tribute to the Bright Eyes album Lifted or The Story Is in the Soil, Keep Your Ear to the Ground.

In October, Sarah and the Safe Word re-teamed with Say-10 to release a remixed and remastered version of their first album, Strange Doings in the Night, along with a first-ever vinyl pressing. The record had previously been unavailable on streaming due to the band being unhappy with the production quality. In addition to remastering, the re-issue also features more contributions from Ballinger and Reksten, who were not official members during the original recording, and Reksten drew updated cover art for the new release.

=== The Book of Broken Glass (2022–2025) ===
While promoting the Strange Doings re-release, Rose confirmed that the band had recorded a fourth album the previous June, with Jim Wirt returning as producer. On February 2, 2023, the band released a music video for "Ruby Off The Rails", the lead single for their fourth album, now titled The Book of Broken Glass and confirmed for release on April 7 via Take This To Heart. The band simultaneously announced an upcoming U.S. and Canada tour with Shayfer James, to commence on March 31. A second single, "Sky On Fire", was released on February 23; Rose remarked that the song was "inspired directly from our experiences being queer in America in 2023." Adam Grundy of Chorus.FM included The Book of Broken Glass in the site's "Most Anticipated of 2023". A third single and music video, "Old Lace", was released on March 16. The album was released on April 7, with features by Dog Park Dissidents and Danbert Nobacon of Chumbawamba.

In July 2023, the band performed their first international shows with a series of dates in the United Kingdom.

On July 16, violinist Susy Reyes announced via Instagram that she had left the band.

The band continued to perform and release new material throughout 2024, including the singles "Pornstar Martini" and "Invert the Jenny".

In spring 2025, the band toured as supporting act for Bear Ghost, and in October 2025 they served as opening support for That Handsome Devil.

=== Independence and The Disappearing Girl (2025–present) ===
In October 2025, Sarah and the Safe Word released a cover of “The Devil Went Down to Georgia,” announced as the band’s final recording under Take This to Heart Records. The track also marked the first studio recording to feature violinist Leica Wilde. In the same statement, the band confirmed that they had become fully independent and were working on their fifth full-length studio album, planned for release in 2026 and to be self-owned and distributed. The group also announced plans to launch a digital fan club in January 2026, featuring unreleased material, demos, live recordings, a podcast, behind-the-scenes footage, and other exclusive content.

In spring 2026, the band was announced as support for the first leg of Moon Walker’s North American tour alongside Demi the Daredevil.

In April, the band announced the single "Mean Streak", describing it as "the beginning of a new chapter" for the group. The song was released independently on May 8, 2026.

In May, the band announced their fifth studio album, The Disappearing Girl. The band described it as their "first independent album in eight years" and "a story about the strange magic of becoming someone new after the old version of yourself vanishes."

The album's second single, "American Nightshade", featuring Ryan Abel of Bear Ghost, was released on July 24, 2026. The album was released on August 7, 2026.

In fall 2026, the band joined Bear Ghost as support on the North American leg of the Tiny Hitman Tour, alongside Spaceman Bob, beginning in September.

== Musical style ==
Often billing themselves as "cabaret rock" and with the tagline "Jay Gatsby died, we played the funeral", Sarah and the Safe Word employ a 1920s retro aesthetic and performance style inspired by cabaret, burlesque, vaudeville, Broadway theatre, English music hall, steampunk, and Southern Gothic. Founding members Sarah Rose and Kienan Dietrich have cited the subversive origins of styles like cabaret, burlesque, and vaudeville, describing them as the "punk rock" of their era, and seek to emulate that spirit in the modern era. Other visual influences include Rose's teenage interest in Japanese visual kei artists like Malice Mizer, Dir En Grey, and Versailles, and Dietrich's love of the surrealist/impressionist art of Zdzisław Beksiński, Claude Monet, and Vincent van Gogh.

Rose has described the band's live shows as "very big, very raucous" and "as loud as they are theatrical", and has cited Jack White of The White Stripes' sentiment of being "always appreciative of the old school rock bands who would dress up for their performances and gigs, because it felt like they were making an effort to transform themselves for the show." Meanwhile, Kienan Dietrich has said "We try to look at the studio and the stage as two different beasts. When we go into the studio, we’re essentially producing a movie, with all the cinematic flair we can incorporate. We know there will be things that just won’t work on stage, so the translation becomes more like an adaptation process."

=== Genre, influences, and evolution ===
Musically, the band marries the aforementioned influences with elements of punk rock, pop punk, emo, gothic rock, chamber pop, post-hardcore, rock and roll, 1920s jazz and swing, garage rock, bluegrass, gospel, and Latin music. Their sound is most commonly compared to Panic! at the Disco (particularly their debut album), My Chemical Romance, and The Dresden Dolls, as well as Creeper, Gogol Bordello, and The World/Inferno Friendship Society, and musicals like The Rocky Horror Picture Show and The Nightmare Before Christmas. Rose has acknowledged the first three acts as personal influences, alongside metal bands like Linkin Park and The Chariot, post-hardcore acts like Thursday and The Receiving End of Sirens, punk bands like NOFX and Rancid, jazz artists like Ella Fitzgerald, and pop artists like Fleetwood Mac, Elton John, The Doobie Brothers, Spice Girls, NSYNC, and Matchbox Twenty. Rose spent summers in New Orleans growing up, where she was exposed to jazz and Cajun music, and she played in pop punk bands before Sarah and the Safe Word. Dietrich, meanwhile, cites bands like The Smashing Pumpkins and Blind Guardian that "create unique worlds with their studio production", as well as Bad Religion, The Germs, Black Sabbath, and The Beatles. Band members come from classical, jazz, blues, heavy metal, hip hop, and Mariachi backgrounds.

The band's signature sound began to develop on Strange Doings in the Night, which saw them exploring theatricality with strings, horns, keyboards, upright bass, and accordion with the help of local musicians. During the recording process they expanded from three members to six; Rose has jokingly compared the group's large and eccentric lineup to Slipknot and the Dave Matthews Band. On the album, the title track combines pop punk and classical elements a la Dresden Dolls, "Pill Pusher" is a hard rock track reminiscent of Jimmy Eat World, and closer "D.K.Y." is a dark folk song with a violin solo.

On Red Hot & Holy, the group, now having a settled lineup and more experience, expanded on the previous album's theatrical sound. Writing about the title track, Immersive Atlanta wrote that it "vividly demonstrates" that "the group’s theatrical take on alt-rock, pop, and emo has only grown more ambitious and fully realized". Album intro "Invocation" employs a music box and organ for a horror film atmosphere, while "The Louisville Shuffle (R.I.P.)" combines emo, jazz, and big band, using strings and brass to create a speakeasy feel. Lead single "Formula 666" is an uptempo punk song that features pop hooks, distorted guitar riffs, driving drums, and a chaotic heavy bridge with strings and screamed vocals.

On Good Gracious! Bad People., opening track "Welcome to Winterwood" features a prominent harpsichord riff as well as electric guitar, choir vocals, and "dreamscapey" reverbed strings; Rose intended the song to "remove you from where you are and let you enter a storybook." Lead single "The Last Great Sweetheart of the Grand Electric Rodeo" blends blues, rock, and folk to create what one critic called "a goth version of Charlie Daniels' 'The Devil Went Down to Georgia'", employing call and response vocals, strings, and honky tonk piano. "You're All Scotch, No Soda" features piano, violin, and a fast-paced "stop-start" rhythm similar to Black Parade tracks like "House of Wolves" and "Mama". "Sick on Seventh Street" is a slower cabaret song that incorporates a vocal refrain from keyboardist Beth Ballinger, chiming bells, and minimalist percussion. "Bottom of a Bender" has elements of hardcore and screamo with guttural vocals, as well as a theremin to create a "spacey" vibe. "Disobedient" features industrial elements reminiscent of Nine Inch Nails and Marilyn Manson, while closing track "The Bonnie Dell House" has elements of Southern rock. Elsewhere, the single "Solstice" (2021), one of the band's longer songs, features a sweeping orchestra and a screamed pre-chorus.

=== Lyrical themes ===
In keeping with their inspirations, the band's lyrics emphasize theatrical, macabre storytelling, often utilizing supernatural and gothic horror tropes with a lighthearted campy tone. Humor also plays a role in the band's songwriting; Rose has said she has "always loved a really asinine and absurdist kind of humor," and songs often use humor to counterbalance dark subject matter.

The band's first EP, Afterlife, was written while Rose was recovering from a breakup and a suicide attempt; she would later describe it as the band's "darkest body of work" and say that she had "got all my dark stuff out" with the record. Strange Doings in the Night, meanwhile, "came out of me trying to rediscover myself, my voice, and who I was." Reviewing the album's 2022 re-issue, Julie River of New Noise Magazine described the song "You're the Sort of Man I Like" as "a modern, queer twist on a very classic vaudevillian duet", while the album as a whole had "a sort of whimsical style of gothicness that’s less Edgar Allen Poe [sic] and more Nightmare Before Christmas".

For Red Hot & Holy, the group approached the songs as individual stories within a larger narrative. "Formula 666" tells of a 1950s drag racer who makes a deal with the Devil to save her girlfriend's life, meant to evoke exploitation cinema and reminiscent of 1950s teenage tragedy songs, while "Dead Girls Tell No Tales" is a pirate-themed song in the style of a sea shanty. "Dig a Fancy Grave" is one of the band's few overtly political songs and is critical of capitalism, proclaiming at one point "Eat the fucking rich!". The title track was written to promote a "healthy perspective on intimacy and relationships". Rose described the album as having central themes of confidence, self-awareness, liberation, self-realization, optimism, and sarcasm in the face of adversity, and wrote album closer "Lit Cigarette" with the intent of ending the album on an empowered note.

On Good Gracious! Bad People., "Welcome to Winterwood" depicts a shadowy mythical location in the forest where "villains", "racketeers", and "wayward travelers" find refuge, setting the tone for the album. "You're All Scotch, No Soda" confronts misogyny, toxic masculinity, and machismo within hookup culture, with lyrics such as "Told me to smile more/So I took his teeth". "The Last Great Sweetheart of the Grand Electric Rodeo" was inspired by "rodeo sweethearts and robot cowboys riding horses", and tells of a woman seducing a mechanical rodeo cowboy. "Sick on Seventh Street" is a tribute to the band's experiences with New York City's nightlife. "Bottom of a Bender" utilizes sci-fi imagery such as rayguns and time travel; the band compared the song to Chumbawamba because it "sounds very get knocked down and get up again". Other tracks describe a greedy and disloyal television star ("A Celebration - With A Vengeance?!"), a mysterious stranger who grants wishes at a cost ("When Oskar Fische Comes To Town"), and a hurricane that causes the body of a murder victim to resurface in Lake Pontchartrain ("Something is Afoot on Old Man McGrady's River").

== Social advocacy and politics ==
While the band largely avoids overt politics, preferring to provide escapism, they have expressed support for a number of social causes. All members of Sarah and the Safe Word identify as queer, priding themselves on having a "queer- and POC-positive" lineup, and the band seeks to provide LGBT visibility and to create safe spaces for people of all identities. Lead singer Sarah Rose, who is a trans woman, also works as a journalist and LGBT activist outside of music, most notably with the organization Care2. Despite this, Rose in 2017 expressed a reluctance to make the band members' LGBT identity a "focal point", saying that "we don't sing about gender issues as prominently as [a band like] Against Me! would." However, in a 2019 interview, Rose stated that the group was "proud of being an all-queer band" and that "You have a responsibility to be an advocate and speak up for your community."

In March 2017, the band released a cover of "Everybody Wants to Rule the World" by Tears for Fears, with all proceeds being donated to the National Center for Transgender Equality.

Following the suicide of Linkin Park frontman Chester Bennington in August 2017, Rose organized Breaking the Habit: A Concert for Mental Health and Suicide Awareness at The Masquerade, which featured Sarah and the Safe Word alongside The Callous Daoboys and other local acts to raise money for the National Suicide Prevention Lifeline. Later that month, shortly after the infamous Unite the Right rally in Charlottesville, Virginia, the band wrote in a statement that "the alt-right (or as we prefer to call them, white supremacist Nazi fucks) are not and never will be welcome at our shows."

Following the 2016 United States presidential election in which Donald Trump was declared president, the band posted an upside-down American flag to Instagram. In October 2018, when it was reported that the Trump administration was considering policy that would effectively define transgender people out of existence, the band expressed solidarity with "our transgender and non-binary brothers, sisters, and siblings" and announced that all digital revenue from their music for the next month would be donated to the National Center for Transgender Equality and The Trevor Project. Responding to the 2020 United States presidential election in Georgia and the subsequent disputes over vote counting by supporters of Donald Trump, the band posted an image to Instagram reading "Let's count the votes. We've never been prouder to be from Atlanta." Following the 2024 United States presidential election, the band once again posted an upside-down American flag to Instagram along with a post restating their "Make America Queer Again" message. The band has also made posts providing LGBTQ+ suicide prevention resources.

Following the 2019 El Paso shooting, the band voiced support for gun reform and urged fans to join them in donating to Everytown for Gun Safety.

In May 2020, during the George Floyd protests, the band expressed support for the protests on Instagram, encouraging fans to say the names of George Floyd, Trayvon Martin, Sandra Bland, and Philando Castile, and wrote that "This is and has always been America, but it doesn't have to be America forever." They also posted a photo of bassist Maddox Reksten holding a sign reading "White silence = violence", captioned "Black lives matter." In July 2021, the band announced they had cancelled a show at the venue Smith's Olde Bar due to their hosting of a fundraiser for the Atlanta Police Department.

In October 2022, after a string of controversial antisemitic comments from celebrities like Kanye West and Dave Chappelle, the band wrote, "Antisemitism has no place in music, the arts, or culture. Our band will always be a welcome space for Jewish people."

The band has contributed to compilation albums benefitting Feeding America, the National Multiple Sclerosis Society, and the National Center for Transgender Equality.

== Members ==
=== Current members ===
- Sarah Rose – lead vocals (2015–present)
- Kienan Dietrich – guitar, backing vocals (2015–present)
- Beth Ballinger – keys, backing vocals (2017–present)
- Maddox Reksten – bass, backing vocals (2017–present)

=== Former members ===
- Brandon Ward – bass guitar (2015–2017)
- Anna Messick − drums, percussion (2016)
- Jason Abarca − drums, percussion (2017)
- Sam Freeman − drums, percussion (2017–2018)
- Courtney Varner – viola, backing vocals (2017–2020)
- Susy Reyes – violin, backing vocals (2017–2023)
- Carlos Gonzalez – drums, percussion, backing vocals (2020–2023)

=== Current touring musicians ===
- Jeff Matthews – drums, percussion (2023–present)
- Leica Wilde – violin (2025–present)

== Discography ==
=== Studio albums ===
| Title | Details |
|---|---|
| Strange Doings in the Night | First release: March 28, 2017; Re-release: October 25, 2022; Label: Independent (2017), Say-10 (2022) |
| Red Hot & Holy | Released: May 24, 2019; Label: Take This to Heart |
| Good Gracious! Bad People. | Released: October 30, 2020; Label: Take This to Heart |
| The Book of Broken Glass | Released: April 7, 2023; Label: Take This to Heart |
| The Disappearing Girl | Released: August 7, 2026; Label: Independent |

=== EPs ===
| Title | Released | Label |
|---|---|---|
| Afterlife EP | First release: December 27, 2015; Second release: February 6, 2016 | Independent |
| Red Hot and Holy | Released October 26, 2018 | Independent |

=== Singles ===
| Year | Song | Album | Source |
|---|---|---|---|
| 2015 | "Sugar in My Veins" | non-album single | |
| 2016 | "Tainted Love" (Soft Cell cover) | non-album single | |
| 2017 | "Everybody Wants to Rule the World" (Tears for Fears cover) | non-album single | |
| 2017 | "So Metropolitan" | Strange Doings in the Night | |
| 2018 | "Sweet Dreams (Are Made of This)" (Eurythmics cover) | non-album single | |
| 2018 | "Red Hot and Holy" | Red Hot and Holy EP | |
| 2019 | "Formula 666" | Red Hot & Holy | |
| 2020 | "You're All Scotch, No Soda" | Good Gracious! Bad People. | |
| 2020 | "Sick On Seventh Street" | Good Gracious! Bad People. | |
| 2020 | "The Last Great Sweetheart of the Grand Electric Rodeo" / "A Celebration -- With a Vengeance?!" | Good Gracious! Bad People. | |
| 2020 | "Something is Afoot on Old Man McGrady's River" | Good Gracious! Bad People. | |
| 2020 | "Bottom of a Bender" | Good Gracious! Bad People. | |
| 2021 | "Lost Ring on Riverside" | non-album single | |
| 2021 | "Solstice" | non-album single | |
| 2022 | "Flowers" | non-album single | |
| 2023 | "Ruby Off The Rails" | The Book of Broken Glass | |
| 2023 | "Sky On Fire" | The Book of Broken Glass | |
| 2023 | "Old Lace" | The Book of Broken Glass | |
| 2024 | "Pornstar Martini" | non-album single | |
| 2024 | "Invert the Jenny" | non-album single | |
| 2025 | "The Devil Went Down to Georgia" (Charlie Daniels Band cover) | non-album single | |
| 2026 | "Time To Dance" (Panic! at the Disco cover) | non-album single | |
| 2026 | "Mean Streak" | The Disappearing Girl | |

=== Music videos ===
| Year | Song | Director | Album | Source |
|---|---|---|---|---|
| 2016 | "The Supernova" | Lobsterdance Productions | Afterlife EP | |
| 2016 | "Tainted Love" | Adeolu Adebayo | | |
| 2017 | "So Metropolitan" | James Hunt | Strange Doings in the Night | |
| 2017 | "The Louisville Shuffle (RIP)" | James Hunt | Red Hot & Holy EP | |
| 2018 | "Sweet Dreams (Are Made Of This)" | James Hunt | | |
| 2018 | "Red Hot and Holy" | Edward Tumulty | Red Hot and Holy EP | |
| 2019 | "Formula 666" | Nathan Mowery | Red Hot & Holy | |
| 2020 | "You're All Scotch, No Soda" | | Good Gracious! Bad People. | |
| 2020 | "Sick On Seventh Street" | | Good Gracious! Bad People. | |
| 2020 | "The Last Great Sweetheart Of The Grand Electric Rodeo" | Edward Tumulty | Good Gracious! Bad People. | |
| 2020 | "Something is Afoot on Old Man McGrady's River" | Susy Reyes | Good Gracious! Bad People. | |
| 2020 | "When Oskar Fische Comes To Town" | Susy Reyes | Good Gracious! Bad People. | |
| 2023 | "Ruby Off The Rails" | Edward Tumulty | The Book of Broken Glass | |
| 2023 | "Sky On Fire" | Edward Tumulty | The Book of Broken Glass | |
| 2023 | "Old Lace" | Edward Tumulty | The Book of Broken Glass | |
