= Save Face =

- Origin: New Jersey, US
- Genres: Rock, punk rock, alternative rock, emo
- Years active: 2012–present
- Labels: Epitaph, Take This To Heart Records
- Members: Tyler Povanda; RB Roe; Dan Sakumoto; Kent Soliday
- Website: www.saveface.band

Save Face is an American punk band from New Jersey. Formed in 2012, the band released two albums on Epitaph Records. It is not currently signed to a label.

== History ==
Save Face were formed in 2012 in New Jersey. The band released the Folly, a six-song EP on July 8, 2016, through independent label Take This To Heart Records. Produced by Jesse Cannon, the release was also pressed to vinyl by Open Door Records and released in the UK/Europe by Backpack Records. They embarked on a two-month long self-booked North American tour on the same day in support of the six song EP, with the first week in support of A Will Away. They released music videos for every song on the EP, with the first three tracks having a thematic series of interconnecting music videos.

After the North American tour, they did five more tours through the end of 2017 with Mom Jeans., Born Without Bones and more, including appearances at South By South West and The Fest. They released another EP, Folly: On The Rocks on November 17, 2017. The release was composed of reimagined versions of every song on Folly, incorporating string arrangements, acoustic guitars, various percussion, and modified time signatures and tempos. Both EPs were combined for a deluxe CD, tape and vinyl that was pressed for the release.

In March 2018, the band announced spring touring plans including two shows with The Menzingers and a short run with Boston Manor and Free Throw. On April 4, 2018, they announced that they had signed to Epitaph Records with a music video for a new song "Bad", and on May 15, 2018, they announced that their label debut full-length album, Merci, would be released on July 13 of that year. On release day, the band posted a YouTube playlist containing a music video for every song on the album where each video was related to the others, referring to it as a Visual Album. The record release was followed by tours with Prince Daddy & The Hyena and The Early November.

On August 12, 2021, the band released the song "GLITTER", accompanied by a music video. This would be followed by the release of the single and music video "Bury Me (Tonight!)" on September 9, 2021, and the announcement of their forthcoming sophomore album Another Kill For The Highlight Reel, to be released on October 29, 2021. The album's third and final single, "Sharpen Your Teeth", was released on October 12, 2021, accompanied by a music video, as well as a visualizer for a "less intense experience". To celebrate the album's release, the band would play a secret house show at Ghoul Lagoon in New Brunswick, New Jersey on November 4, 2021, with the full set uploaded to YouTube. Following this, they would tour in support of Mom Jeans, The Wonder Years, and Spanish Love Songs, as well as two short runs in support of Origami Angel and Bayside, and an appearance at Riot Fest on Sunday October 18, 2022. On June 6, 2022, they would release a music video for "A.M. Gothic," consisting of footage from the three preceding tours.

From August 29 to September 12, 2022, the band would release live videos of "Another Kill For The Highlight Reel," "Sharpen Your Teeth", and "Bury Me (Tonight!)" recorded at The Barber Shop Studios in New Jersey. These videos would be released on the Epitaph YouTube channel. On October 17, 2022, the band would announce a deluxe version of Another Kill For The Highlight Reel To be released on October 28, 2022, in celebration of the one year anniversary of the album's release. The deluxe edition would contain the original album in full, as well as an acoustic version of "A.M. Gothic" and The Barber Shop Studios live versions of "Another Kill For The Highlight Reel," "Sharpen Your Teeth," and "Bury Me (Tonight!)." Following a show in New York City opening for Enter Shikari, it would be announced that guitarist Page Ragan had played her last show with the band, though no replacement would be named at the time. On June 22, 2023, a collaboration with Jhariah entitled "A Lesson in Dramatics" would be released.

On September 12, 2023, the band would announce a new single entitled "Found Dead At The Crime Scene" to be released on September 19. This would be their first ever independent release, following the end of the band's contract with Epitaph Records.

== Band members ==
=== Current members ===
- Tyler Povanda – lead vocals (2012–present)
- Robbie Roe (RB) – bass, backing vocals (2019–present)
- Dan Sakumoto – drums (2019–present)
- Kent Soliday – keys, guitar, vocals (2021–present)

=== Past members ===
- Page Ragan – guitar, backing vocals (2021–2023)

=== Touring members ===
- Matt Yankovich – guitar (2021-2022)
- Cameron Handford – guitar (2022)

== Discography ==
=== Studio albums ===
- Merci (2018, Epitaph Records)
- Another Kill for the Highlight Reel (2021, Epitaph Records)

=== EPs ===
- Lost At Heart (2013)
- Save Face / BRIGHTENER Split (2013)
- Save Face // My Heart, My Anchor (2015, Not on Label)
- Folly (2016, Take This To Heart Records, Open Door Records)
- Folly: On the Rocks (2017, Take This To Heart Records)
- Split w/ Graduating Life (2019, Epitaph Records)

=== Singles ===
- "Preoccupied" (2016, Not on Label)
- "Preoccupied: On the Rocks" (2017, Take This to Heart Records)
- "Bad" (2018, Epitaph Records)
- "Heartache" (2018, Epitaph Records)
- "Nothin'" (2018, Epitaph Records)
- "Pour (Redux)" (2020, Epitaph Records)
- "GLITTER" (2021, Epitaph Records)
- "Bury Me (Tonight!)" (2021, Epitaph Records)
- "Sharpen Your Teeth" (2021, Epitaph Records)
- “A Lesson In Dramatics” (feat. Jhariah) (2023, Counter Intuitive Records)
- ”Song The Bullets Sing” (feat. Heart Attack Man) (2023, Counter Intuitive Records)
- "Found Dead at the Crime Scene" (2023, Counter Intuitive Records)
