= McCafferty (band) =

American indie rock band

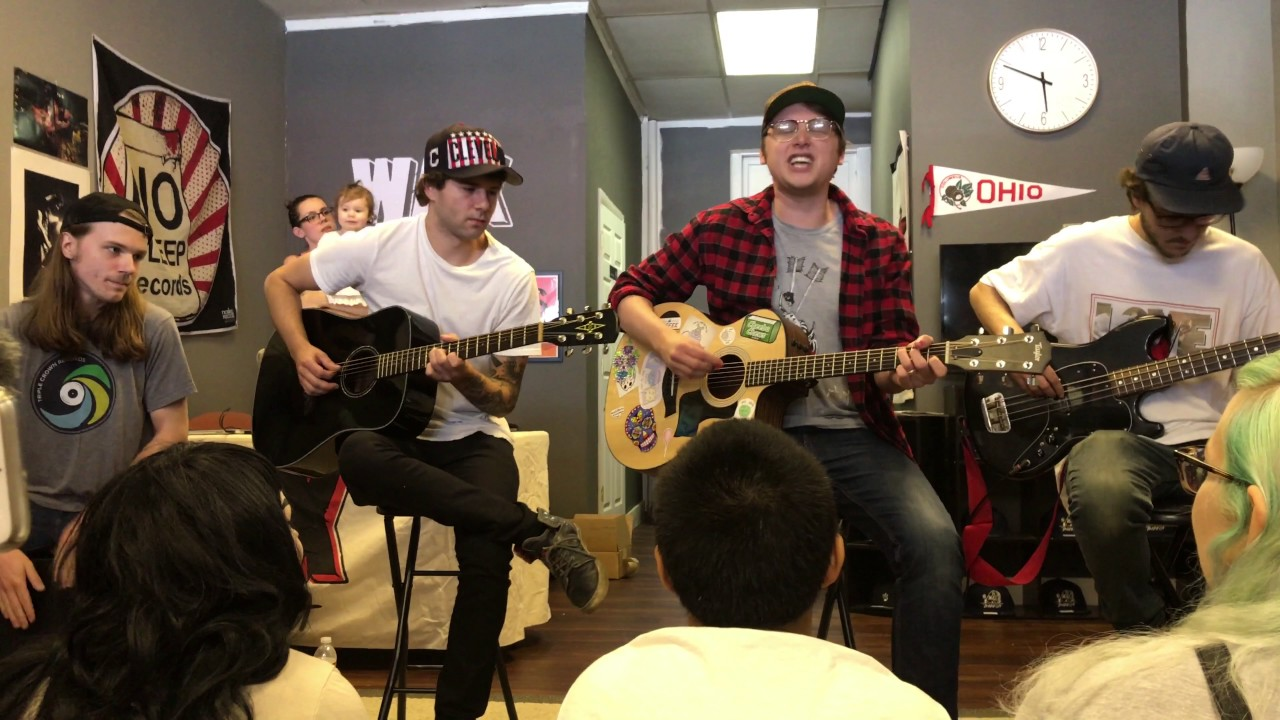
- McCafferty live at the Wax Bodega in 2017

Background information
- Origin: Medina, Ohio, United States
- Genres: Indie rock; Midwest emo; punk rock; indie; emo; spoken word
- Years active: 2011–Present
- Labels: Soft Speak; Monkey Boy; Sliding Scale; Take This to Heart; Triple Crown
- Members: Nick Hartkop; Emily Hartkop; Wyatt Gardner; Seth Giles
- Past members: Evan Graham; Wes Easterly; Chris Joecken; Noah Yoder; Alex D
- Website: mccaffertyband.com

McCafferty is an American indie rock band from Medina, Ohio. The band's lineup before hiatus consisted of Nick Hartkop on guitar and vocals and his partner Emily Hartkop on bass.

The band's early releases feature Hartkop performing solo and producing an acoustic dance-punk sound. In later recordings, following the addition of Graham, and subsequently Joecken and Easterly, the band has evolved to encompass a pop-punk and emo sound. The band later reformed in 2018, without Joecken, who went to on to form Sister Sandy with Easterly, while Hartkop's wife Emily Hartkop replaced Joecken on bass. The band has notoriously gone through several breakups and reformations, most recently in February 2020 where all remaining members left the band aside from Nick and Emily.

== History ==
McCafferty was formed in 2011 and at the time was mainly a solo acoustic effort from singer-songwriter Nick Hartkop. Hartkop self-released the EP Moms+Dads under the name McCafferty in June 2012. He followed this up with Japan (his second acoustic EP) and DanceBeats to Hurt Girls on Christmas Day 2012, the first release to feature drummer Evan Graham. In 2013, McCafferty released three EPs – It's a Bad Idea in January, I Hate This Body in April, and Forest Life in July, as well as a collaborative live album, This Will Mean Nothing (A Live Acoustic Split), which featured tracks from Sam Rockwell Machete Champion and Chris Joecken (who at the time had not yet joined McCafferty). Via Soft Speak Records, there was a limited cassette release of I Hate This Body.

In early 2014, the band signed with Monkey Boy Records to release its first full-length LP, Beachboy, on vinyl, and to Sliding Scale Records for a CD release. Following a hard drive crash and the loss of the majority of the songs for the planned When The Lightning Hit EP, the band announced on Facebook they had broken up. However, vocalist Nick would post two demos over the summer to the band's Bandcamp, and in fall of that same year, the Happy Birthday Dad EP was released, containing a mix of old and new songs.

Early 2015 saw the band quietly releasing the track Oh My, and over the summer, the single Top Hat, which was announced as being the lead single to the upcoming Beachboy 2 album.

Between the beginning and summer of 2016 the band started officially working on its second full-length LP, Beachboy 2, but after three singles were released, the project was ultimately abandoned due to Hartkop claiming he had decided to disband the group and return to full-time work as a special education teacher.

In late 2016, the band reformed after a successful fan-led crowdfunding effort to support the production of another EP, with the working title DanceBeats For Hurt Girls. After the overwhelming success of the campaign, the band signed a single record deal with Take This To Heart Records and released Thanks. Sorry. Sure. on June 30, 2017.

On July 22, 2017, Thanks. Sorry. Sure. charted 23rd on Billboards top Independent albums and 5th on Heatseekers Albums and remained there for a week. On February 2, 2018, the band released a split EP alongside fellow Ohio band Heart Attack Man.

On February 13, 2018, the band announced they had signed to Triple Crown Records, and that their second full-length album, Yarn, would be released on March 23, 2018. It was announced on April 1, 2018, that they cancelled their upcoming shows on their tour with Moose Blood, and yet again, the band fell silent on social media.

On June 25, 2018, Hartkop announced via the official McCafferty Twitter that he would be releasing a compilation record titled "The Sum of All Fears" that would include nearly all the tracks from the band's discography pre-Beachboy. While all the material had at one point been on streaming services, it had been nearly four years since this was the case. The record was released on Spotify on June 28, 2018. An EP, Clementine, was released on August 11, along with an official announcement from the band regarding their permanent breakup. The band later reformed, without longtime bassist Chris Joecken.

On December 29, 2018, the band released Yarn: Commentary. It contains input from Wes Easterly, Evan Graham, and Nick Hartkop about the influences and ideas behind the album.

The band released their third album, The House with No Doorbell, on October 20, 2019, following a successful small tour. They released a single, "Fentanyl", on June 18 ahead of the release of the album. A second single, "Sellout", was released on September 22. November saw McCafferty releasing "Divva (I Murdered Nick Hartkop)", which featured an emo-rap style. The planned tour in support of the album was also cancelled, with Nick's wife taking to Instagram to explain the reasons behind the cancellation. Not long after, an EP was announced featuring re-recorded versions of songs from the band's earlier EPs, with Graveyard (a track from the scrapped When The Lightning Hit EP) being released on December 10. This has yet to be released as of August 2022.

In the weeks following, drummer Wes Easterly announced in a now deleted Instagram post that he was leaving the band, citing difficulties with working alongside Nick. On January 30, 2020, guitarist Evan Graham took to Instagram to detail a number of allegations against Nick, including emotionally abusive behavior, violent threats, and racist jokes. Immediately following this, all social media for McCafferty was deleted, including the personal accounts of both Nick and Emily.

In July 2020, Easterly, Graham, and Joecken filed a lawsuit against Hartkop over unpaid royalties, totaling over $100,000 in streaming revenue from Spotify alone. Hartkop had allegedly cut the rest of the band off financially when their allegations were published.

Since early 2021, Nick has steadily released singles, and occasionally posts life updates to his blog, detailing his struggles with the various mental illnesses he has been diagnosed with.

On October 27, 2022, McCafferty's fourth album, Snoqualmie Welcomes You was released on YouTube, ahead of its debut on streaming services. Nick then began the process of re-recording older songs.

On October 14, 2023, McCafferty released a new album, Sum of All Fears II: The Lost Songs, a collection of 15 songs as a sequel to one of their earlier albums, Sum of all Fears.

On March 24, 2024 McCafferty held their first concert in almost 5 years, as well as their last ever concert at El Corazon, Seattle Washington. It opened at 7PM, With the set beginning at 7:30PM. It opened with Alex Rivers, who was featured on McCafferty's recent single Life Of An Artist, as well as "My Cartoon Heart". "Liam's neighbourhood" was scheduled to open in the slot played by "My Cartoon Heart" but had to cancel due to an unexpected circumstance unrelated to McCafferty. The concert benefitted the Trevor Project, with a portion of revenue from the price of the tickets and available merch at the concert, which included T-shirts, Posters, and Hoodies.

On September 16, 2024, McCafferty released their twelfth EP, I’ve been thinking about giving up lately, beginning their at the time alleged hiatus.

This hiatus, however, was relatively short-lived compared to other bands in the genre, because on July 5, 2025, they released a single called Medina, Ohio that delves into his thoughts about the location and people from his hometown.

On October 9, 2025, Nick Hartkop announced a short 3 song EP that consists of demos played during his vow renewal with spouse Emily Hartkop. In addition two three new songs, the demo of Dead Bird was released. Currently, this EP seems to be limited to Spotify only. Hartkop also mentioned that he has developed arthritis, which affects his mobility and ability to play guitar.

On October 31, 2026, Nick Hartkop releases a new song called "All I Do Is Cry".

== Band members ==
Members

- Nick Hartkop – lead vocals, rhythm guitar (2011–Present)
- Emily Hartkop – bass, backing vocals (2019–Present)
- Wyatt Gardner – drums (2020–Present)
- Seth Giles – lead guitar (2024–Present)

Former members

- Alex D – piano (2020)
- Evan Graham – lead guitar (2014, 2016–2020), drums (2013, 2014)
- Wes Easterly – drums (2013, 2014–2019)
- Chris Joecken – bass (2014, 2016–2018)
- Noah Yoder – bass (2013, 2014)

Timeline

== Discography ==
Studio albums

- Beachboy (2014)
- Yarn (2018)
- The House with No Doorbell (2019)
- Snoqualmie Welcomes You (2022)
- McCafferty Forever (2023)

EPs

- Moms+Dads (2012)
- Japan (2012)
- DanceBeats to Hurt Girls (2012)
- It's A Bad Idea (2013)
- I Hate This Body (2013)
- Forest Life (2013)
- Happy Birthday, Dad (2014)
- Thanks. Sorry. Sure. (2017)
- Forest Lice (Remastered) (2017)
- Clementine (2018)
- Two Demos Never Released in 2017 So Please Don't Think I'm Coming Back, I Promise You I Won't (2020)
- I’ve been thinking about giving up lately (2024)
- Vow Renewal (Phone Demos) (2025)

Compilations

- RIP McCafferty (2015)
- The Sum of All Fears (2018)
- The Sum of All Fears II: The Lost Songs (2023)

Splits

- This Will Mean Nothing (A Live Acoustic Split) (with Sam Rockwell Machete Champion and Chris Joecken) (2013)
- McCafferty / Heart Attack Man Split (Take This To Heart Records, Triple Crown Records, 2018)

Singles

- Skeleton Bones (2013)
- Trees (2013)
- Dead-Bird (2013)
- The Lion's Den (2013)
- When The Lightning Hit (2014)
- Hold Hands (2014)
- Graveyard (2014)
- Oh My (2015)
- Top Hat (2015)
- Lumber Yard (2016)
- McCafferty Vs. TFB (2016)
- Butterfly (2016)
- The Roots (2016)
- Daddy-Longlegs (2016)
- Trailer Trash (2017)
- Outlaw (2017)
- Finally (2018)
- Loser (2018)
- Strain (2018)
- Clementine (2018)
- Fentanyl (2019)
- Sellout (2019)
- Divva (I Murdered Nick Hartkop) (2019)
- Graveyard (2019)
- Isn't It Beautiful? (2020)
- Beachboy 2 (2021)
- If I Saw Him, I'd Still Kiss Him (2021)
- Queerball (2021)
- Witchcraft (2021)
- Ugly Duckling (2022)
- Cheetah Print Bag (2022)
- Salish (2022)
- Insincere Everclear (2022)
- Liquid Courage (2022)
- Snoqualmie (2022)
- Is Your Shirt Inside Out (2023)
- Skeleton Bones (2023)
- Burning vs Drowning (2023)
- Swingset (2023)
- There's Something In The Water Here (2023)
- The Life of an Artist (2023)
- Tell Me Lover, Do You Love Me? (2024)
- Leatherface (2024)
- Goodbye Moon, Goodbye Stars (2024)
- The Spider and the Root Canal (2024)
- Medina Ohio (2025)
- Introduction by Nick Hartkop (2025)
- Yours Mine Hours - Demo (2025)
- Dead Bird - Demo (2025)
- Bottles and Cans - Demo (2025)
- All I Do Is Cry (2026)
