= Say So (album) =

Studio album by Bent Knee
- Released: 20 May 2016
- Genre: Art rock; progressive rock; baroque pop
- Length: 51:43
- Label: Cuneiform Records
- Producer: Vince Welch

Bent Knee chronology
Shiny Eyed Babies (2014)	Say So (2016)	Land Animal (2017)

Professional ratings
Review scores
Source	Rating
Wall Street Journal	(favorable)
TeamRock	(favorable)
Boston Globe	(favorable)
All About Jazz	4.5/5 stars

Say So is the third studio album by American art rock band Bent Knee. It's the band's only record to be published by Cuneiform Records.

== Track listing ==
All tracks are written by Bent Knee.

No.	Title	Length
1.	"Black Tar Water"	3:29
2.	"Leak Water"	4:41
3.	"Counselor"	5:50
4.	"EVE"	9:12
5.	"Interlude"	0:49
6.	"The Things You Love"	6:12
7.	"Nakami"	5:19
8.	"Commercial"	3:44
9.	"Hands Up"	5:40
10.	"Good Girl"	6:43

== Personnel ==
- Courtney Swain – lead vocals, keyboards
- Ben Levin – guitars, backing vocals
- Jessica Kion – bass, backing vocals
- Vince Welch – synthesizers, sound design, production
- Chris Baum – violin, backing vocals
- Gavin Wallace-Ailsworth – drums

=== Additional personnel ===
- Andy Bergman – alto saxophone, clarinet
- Ben Swartz – cello
- Bryan Murphy – trumpet
- Geni Skendo – flute, shakuhachi
- Geoff Nielsen – trombone
- James Dineen – voice acting
- Keith Dickerhofe – cello
- Nathan Cohen – violin
- Sam Morrison – baritone saxophone
- Rebecca Hallowell – viola
