= Heart Attack Man =

American punk rock band

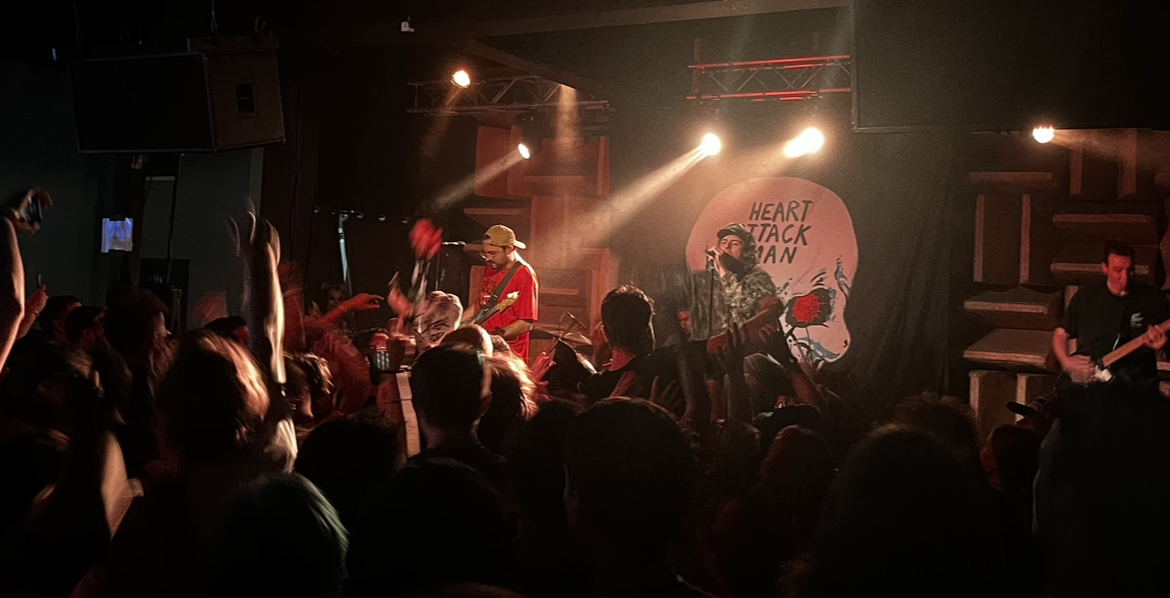
- Heart Attack Man performing in Indianapolis, Indiana on June 30, 2023

Background information
- Origin: Cleveland, Ohio
- Genres: Punk rock, emo, hardcore punk, pop punk, alternative rock
- Years active: 2013–present
- Labels: Mayfly Records, Triple Crown Records, You Did This Records, Many Hats Distribution
- Members: Eric Egan; Ty Sickels; Adam Paduch
- Past members: Seamus Groman; Logan McNeal; Josh Voland
- Website: https://heartattackman.com

Heart Attack Man is an American punk rock band from Cleveland, Ohio. The band has released four full-length albums, as well as numerous EPs and singles.

== History ==
Heart Attack Man released a demo on August 19, 2013; originally a studio project that Eric Egan never intended to play live shows with. After local buzz developed around the project, live lineups of the band formed, with Adam Paduch being the original drummer. In 2014, the band released their first EP titled Acid Rain on Mayfly Records. The demo and Acid Rain were recorded as the band was beginning to solidify its early lineup, with Egan recording all instruments.

Around the release of Acid Rain, the band had begun to take shape further, and was joined by guitarist JV Voland. During this time, the band made their first ventures into regional touring after solidifying themselves as a Cleveland scene favorite; breaking to a wider Northeastern U.S. and Midwest audience, as well as making their first visits across the Canadian border. They also recorded their first album in Philadelphia with Ian Farmer, who the band had met from playing with Ian's band at the time, Modern Baseball. The band self-funded the studio time on a shoestring budget; completing it in six nonstop, coffee-fueled days at Headroom Studios. The band was beginning to make very formative friendships in the scene, as well as starting to garner a reputation for themselves; cutting their teeth experiencing the full gamut of early touring; playing house shows, DIY venues, and small clubs. Before the release of the first full-length album, Voland parted ways from Heart Attack Man. They continue releasing music and performing as The House Of Wills.

On March 3, 2017, Heart Attack Man released their debut full-length album on Triple Crown Records titled The Manson Family, and while on their first full U.S. tour in support of this album, longtime friends guitarist Ty Sickels and bassist Seamus Groman joined the band. In 2018, Heart Attack Man released a split with fellow Ohio band McCafferty. Heart Attack Man would go on to separate their songs from the split release online and issue a version of the artwork with McCafferty removed; wanting to distance themselves from McCafferty and the record label that released the split; as a myriad of troubling allegations made by former partners and band members surfaced against the singer of McCafferty. Late 2018, Heart Attack Man recorded their second full-length album “Fake Blood” at the Barbershop Recording Studio in Hopatcong, New Jersey with Brett Romnes. Before the release of the album, the band toured in late 2018 with Drug Church and Gouge Away. On April 19, 2019, Heart Attack Man released their sophomore album, “Fake Blood,” again through Triple Crown Records. At this point, the band began growing significantly to a nationwide audience; touring the United States and Canada extensively. In mid 2019, bassist Seamus Groman parted ways from the band shortly after a string of headlining shows and two shows opening for Taking Back Sunday.

In late 2019 the band announced a tour alongside Boston Manor. In 2020 the band announced a tour with Chicago pop punk band Knuckle Puck. At this time, the band was joined by bassist Logan McNeal. In late 2021 the EP Thoughtz & Prayerz was released, followed by a US tour supporting Neck Deep. In 2022, the band embarked on their first headlining tour, the “Thoughtz & Prayerz Across North America” tour. After this, the band toured in the U.K. and mainland Europe for the first time, supporting State Champs, followed by a fall U.S. tour supporting Blackbear and a late fall tour supporting Tigers Jaw. Shortly after this, the band began recording their third full-length album, joined by Lil Aaron as producer. This was their first full-length album to not be released with Triple Crown Records; as the band fulfilled their contract and wanted to continue forward independently. Before the release of this album, McNeal parted ways with the band.

In 2023, the band released their third full-length album Freak of Nature and embarked on the aptly-titled Freak of NaTOUR album release tour, immediately followed by their first U.K. headlining tour, titled “FreU.K. Of NaTOUR.” Fall 2023, the band supported Hot Mulligan on their album release tour, quickly followed by a return to the U.K. and mainland Europe in early 2024, supporting Spanish Love Songs.

== Band members ==
=== Current ===
- Eric Egan – vocals, guitar (2013–present)
- Ty Sickels – guitar (2017–present)
- Adam Paduch – drums (2013–present)

=== Former ===
- Josh Voland — guitar (2014–2016)
- Seamus Groman – bass (2017–2019)
- Logan McNeal – bass (2020-2023)

== Discography ==
Studio Albums

- The Manson Family (Triple Crown Records, 2017)
- Fake Blood (You Did This Records, Triple Crown Records, 2019)
- Freak of Nature (Many Hats Distribution, 2023)
- Joyride The Pale Horse (2025)

EPs

- Demo (2013)
- Acid Rain (2014)
- Thoughtz & Prayerz (2021)

Splits

- Heart Attack Man/McCafferty (Triple Crown Records, Take This To Heart Records, 2018)
