= Say Anything =

Say Anything may refer to:

== Film and television ==
- Say Anything..., a 1989 American film by Cameron Crowe
- "Say Anything" (BoJack Horseman), a television episode

== Music ==
- Say Anything (band), an American rock band
  - Say Anything (album), a 2009 album by the band
  - "Say Anything", a 2012 song by Say Anything from Anarchy, My Dear
- "Say Anything" (Marianas Trench song), 2006
- "Say Anything" (X Japan song), 1991
- "Say Anything", a song by Aimee Mann from Whatever, 1993
- "Say Anything", a song by the Bouncing Souls from The Bouncing Souls, 1997
- "Say Anything", a song by Good Charlotte from The Young and the Hopeless, 2002
- "Say Anything", a song by Girl in Red, 2018
- "Say Anything", a song by Will Young from Lexicon, 2019
- "Say Anything (Else)", a song by Cartel from Chroma, 2005

== Other uses ==
- Say Anything (party game), a 2008 board game published by North Star Games
- "Say Anything", a column in YM magazine

== See also ==
- Say Something (disambiguation)
- "Slay Anything", an episode of Legends of Tomorrow
