= Say Something =

Say Something or Say Somethin' may refer to:

== Music ==
=== Albums ===
- Say Something (album), by Via Audio, 2007
- Say Something or the title song, by Andy Leek, 1988
- Say Something, by Ellis Paul, 1993

=== Songs ===
- "Say Something" (Royel Otis song), 2025
- "Say Somethin" (Austin Mahone song), 2012
- "Say Something" (A Great Big World song), 2013; covered by Tiësto, 2020
- "Say Something" (Karen Harding song), 2015
- "Say Something" (Kylie Minogue song), 2020
- "Say Something" (Justin Timberlake song), 2018
- "Say Somethin'" (Mariah Carey song), 2006
- "Say Something" (Sonny Fodera and Becky Hill song), 2026
- "Say Something" (Timbaland song), 2009
- "Say Something", by Dr. Dog from Easy Beat, 2005
- "Say Something", by Drake from So Far Gone, 2009
- "Say Something", by Eskimo Joe, 2020
- "Say Something", by Flying Lotus from Flamagra, 2019
- "Say Something", by Fra Lippo Lippi, 1984
- "Say Somethin'", by Gloria Gaynor from I Have a Right, 1979
- "Say Something", by Haven, 2002
- "Say Something", by James from Laid, 1993
- "Say Something", by Keith Urban from The Speed of Now Part 1, 2020
- "Say Something", by Lapush from Someplace Closer to Here, 2005
- "Say Something", by Talib Kweli from Eardrum, 2007
- "Say Something", by Twice from Eyes Wide Open, 2020

== Other uses ==
- "Say Something" (Gilmore Girls), a television episode
- Say Something, a 1968 children's book by Mary Stolz

== See also ==
- Say Anything (disambiguation)
