= Rat Tally =

Rat Tally is the stage name of American indie rock musician Addy Harris. Harris is currently based in Chicago, Illinois.

== History ==
Harris began releasing music in 2019, when she self-released her debut EP titled When You Wake Up. This release caught the attention of Richmond, Virginia based record label 6131 Records. In 2021, Harris signed to the label and released a new song titled "Shrug". Harris announced in mid 2022 her debut album, In My Car, which is set to be released through 6131 on April 12, 2022. In addition to the announcement, Harris released the first single from the album, "Spinning Wheel". The album features contributions from musicians Madeline Kenney and Jay Som.

== Discography ==
Studio albums

- In My Car (2022, 6131 Records)

EPs

- When You Wake Up (2019, self-released)
