= Free Throw (band) =

American emo band

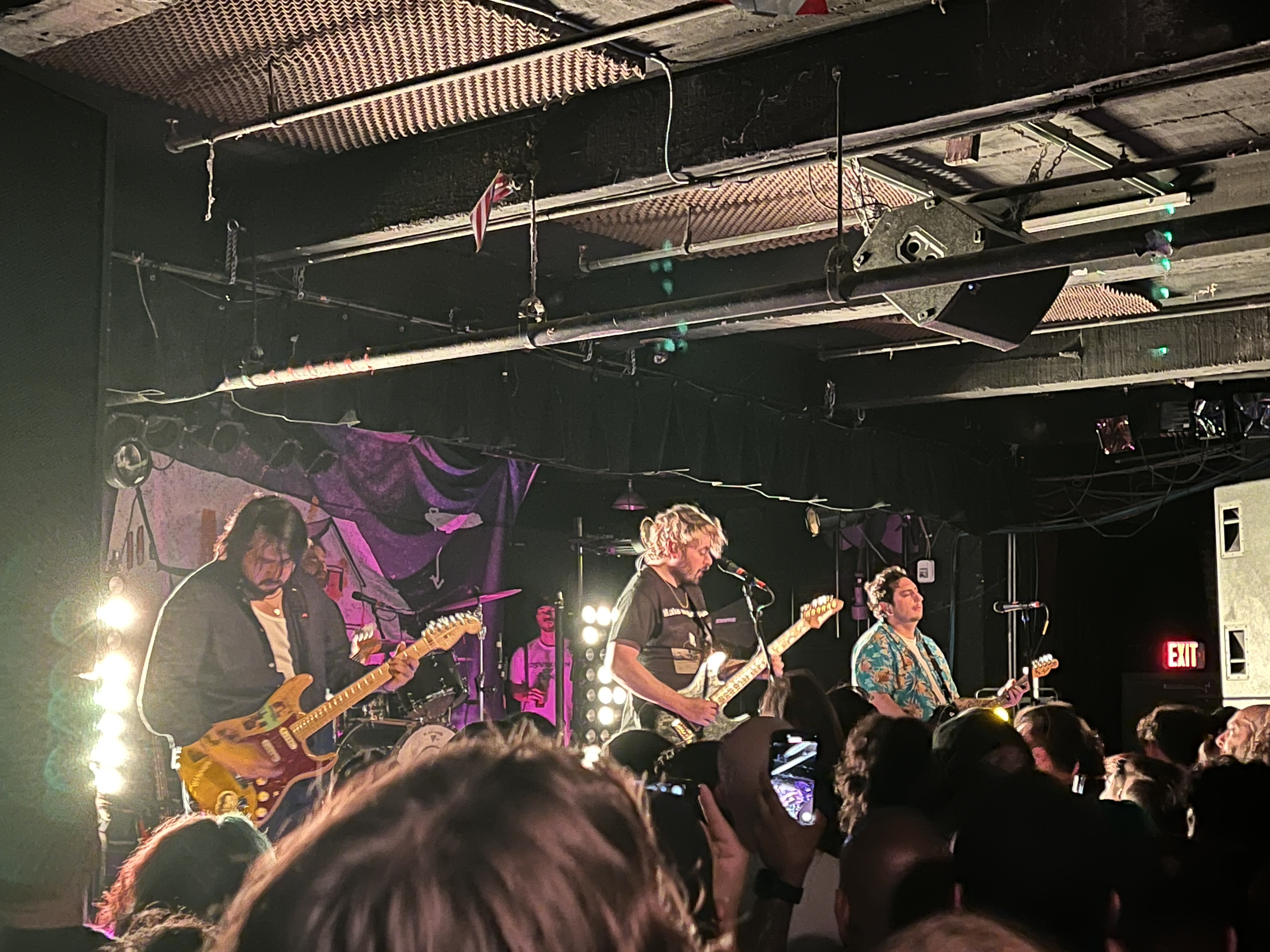
- Free Throw performing at the Black Cat in Washington, D.C., on 19 April 2025

Background information
- Origin: Nashville, Tennessee, U.S.
- Genres: Emo, punk rock, pop punk, post-hardcore, indie rock
- Years active: 2012–present
- Labels: Count Your Lucky Stars Records, Triple Crown Records, Wax Bodega
- Members: Cory Castro; Jake Hughes; Zach Hall; Justin Castro; Lawrence Warner
- Past members: Kevin Garcia; Wes Winslett; Tim Casey
- Website: freethrowband.com

Free Throw is an American emo band from Nashville, Tennessee. As of 2025, they are signed to Wax Bodega.

== History ==
Free Throw was formed in April 2012 after the members had graduated high school and had met each other through the Nashville music scene while playing in previous bands. Vocalist Cory Castro has stated that they were initially inspired to start a band while listening to Topshelf Records artists together, describing the experience as "a couple of beers and a couple of ideas".

The band has since released six full-length albums, titled Those Days Are Gone, Bear Your Mind, What's Past is Prologue, Piecing It Together, Lessons That We Swear to Keep and Moments Before The Wind. They have also released three EPs, titled Free Throw, Lavender Town, and Missing Pieces. After the release of their debut album, the band embarked on a tour opening for Empire! Empire! (I Was a Lonely Estate).

== Musical style and lyrics ==
Free Throw has been described as an "emo-punk" band marked by an "energetic sound" that is augmented by a "strong melodic sense" and "gritty catharsis". The group has been categorized as emo, punk rock, pop punk, post-hardcore and indie rock. In an interview, vocalist Cory Castro defined the term "emo" as "taking your emotions and wearing them on your sleeve". He described the band's sound as deriving from bands such as Snowing and Algernon Cadwallader, while also citing Fall Out Boy and My Chemical Romance as influences on the band's "pop sensibility". Lyrical themes often include topics such as alcoholism, addiction, relationships, and body image.

Castro is a fan of the Pokémon video game franchise, and several of the band's song titles are direct references to the series. Examples include "Lavender Town", "Pallet Town", "Cerulean City", "Better Have Burn Heal", "Victory Road", "Cinnabar Island", "Worry Seed", "MissingNo.", and "Tail Whip, Struggle". The frontman has a Poké Ball tattooed on his wrist.

== Members ==
Current band members

- Cory Castro – lead vocals, additional guitar (2012–present)
- Lawrence Warner – lead guitar (2012–present)
- Jake Hughes – rhythm guitar, backing vocals (2013–present)
- Justin Castro – bass (2012–present)
- Zach Hall – drums, backing vocals (2013–2015, 2022–present)

Former band members

- Wes Winslett – rhythm guitar (2012–2013)
- Tim Casey – drums (2012–2013)
- Kevin Garcia – drums, backing vocals (2015–2022)

== Discography ==
Studio albums

- Those Days Are Gone (2014)
- Bear Your Mind (2017)
- What's Past Is Prologue (2019)
- Piecing It Together (2021)
- Lessons That We Swear to Keep (2023)
- Moments Before The Wind (2026)

EPs

- Free Throw (2012)
- Lavender Town (2014)
- Missing Pieces (2018)
