= Triple Crown Records =

American music record label

- Parent company: East West Records
- Founded: 1997
- Founder: Fred Feldman
- Distributor: The Orchard
- Genre: Indie rock; emo; post-rock; New York hardcore (early)
- Country of origin: United States
- Location: New York City
- Official website: www.triplecrownrecords.com

Triple Crown Records is a New York-based rock music record label created in 1997 by Fred Feldman. The label features such artists as The Receiving End of Sirens and The Dear Hunter, and launched the career of Brand New in 2001. It is a part of the East West family of record labels, a subsidiary of Warner Music Group, and is distributed by the Alternative Distribution Alliance.

== Current bands ==
- Adjy
- Caspian
- Covet
- Dogleg
- Foxing
- Free Throw
- From Indian Lakes
- Future Teens
- Holy Fawn
- Into It. Over It.
- Kississippi
- Moving Mountains
- Shortly
- Sorority Noise
- O'Brother
- You Blew It!

== Past bands ==
- 25 Ta Life
- Anterrabae
- As Tall as Lions
- A Will Away
- Bad Books
- Brand New
- Brian Bonz
- Cavetown
- Comin' Correct
- The Dear Hunter
- Death Threat
- E.Town Concrete
- Fight Fair
- Fireworks
- Folly
- The Gay Blades
- Heart Attack Man
- Hit the Lights
- Honor Bright
- Hot Rod Circuit
- Kevin Devine
- King Django
- Lounge
- Lux Courageous
- McCafferty
- Mushmouth
- No Redeeming Social Value
- Northstar
- One 4 One
- Orange Island
- Oso Oso
- Outline
- Outsmarting Simon
- Out to Win
- Overthrow
- Plug in Stereo
- The Receiving End of Sirens
- Safety in Numbers
- Scraps and Heart Attacks
- The Secret Handshake
- Shockwave
- Skarhead
- Skinnerbox
- Small Towns Burn a Little Slower
- Step Lively
- Tiny Moving Parts
- Voice of Reason
- Weatherbox
- Where Fear and Weapons Meet
- xDISCIPLEx A.D.

== See also ==
- List of record labels
