= Dissect (podcast) =

Hip-hop podcast

- Genre: Music; hip hop; Music podcast
- Language: English

Creative team
- Created by: Cole Cuchna
- Written by: Cole Cuchna; Femi Olutade; Titilayo Shodiya; Maggie Lacy; Camden Ostrander

Cast and voices
- Hosted by: Cole Cuchna

Music
- Opening theme: Theme from Dissect by Birocratic
- Ending theme: Theme from Dissect by Birocratic

Production
- Production: Cole Cuchna; Andrew Atwood; Eric Bass
- Length: c. 40 minutes

Publication
- No. of seasons: 11
- No. of episodes: 118
- Original release: August 23, 2016
- Updates: Weekly

Related
- Website: dissectpodcast.com

Dissect is a music podcast that debuted in 2016 and is hosted by Cole Cuchna. The podcast is renowned for its in-depth analysis of contemporary music. Dissect was named "Best podcast of 2017" by Quartz, and the following year was named "Best podcast of 2018" by The New York Times. Additionally, both Time magazine and The Guardian listed Dissect as one of the top 50 podcasts of 2018.

== Content ==
Cuchna has a degree in music composition and approaches the analysis of contemporary music in the same way he does with classical music. From Season 3 onwards, the podcast has been produced by Spotify.

=== Seasons ===
Season	Album(s)	Artist	Year
1	To Pimp a Butterfly	Kendrick Lamar	2016
2	My Beautiful Dark Twisted Fantasy	Kanye West	2017
3	Blonde (and Channel Orange mini-series)	Frank Ocean	2018
4	Flower Boy	Tyler, the Creator	2019
5	Damn	Kendrick Lamar	2019
6	Lemonade	Beyoncé	2020
7	Because the Internet	Childish Gambino	2020
8	Yeezus	Kanye West	2021
9	Swimming / Circles	Mac Miller	2021
10	Igor	Tyler, The Creator	2022
11	In Rainbows	Radiohead	2023
12	Madvillainy	MF Doom	2024
13	Mr. Morale & the Big Steppers	Kendrick Lamar	2025
14	Homework / Discovery / Human After All / Alive 2007 / Random Access Memories	Daft Punk	2026

=== Mini-series ===
Dissect "mini-series" have similar content to normal seasons, but in a shorter format.

Season	Album(s)	Artist	Year
1	The Miseducation of Lauryn Hill	Lauryn Hill	2018
2	Black is King	Beyoncé	2021
3	Inside	Bo Burnham	2022

== Format ==
An episode of Dissect is typically between 30 and 60 minutes. Episodes are usually structured with a short description of the podcast, a recap of the previous episode's conclusion, a listing of the songs credits, and a long-form analysis of the song. Audio samples from music that influenced the song are often included in the initial credits, and song recreations are interspersed throughout the analysis.

Free episodes are released weekly during a season's production and are made available via SoundCloud, Spotify, iTunes, and YouTube, among other services. The first two seasons were supported via Patreon donations but has since switched to advertising. Cuchna selects a different charity to support for each season through listener donations.

=== Awards ===
Award	Date	Category	Result	Ref.
Discover Pods Awards	2019	Music Podcast	Won	
Discover Pods Awards	2021	Music Podcast	Finalist	
Ambies	2021	Best Entertainment Podcast	Nominated	
Webby Awards	2018	Best Writing	Honoree	
Webby Awards	2019	Arts & Culture	Nominated	
Webby Awards	2020	People's Voice Winner - Music Podcasts	Won	
Webby Awards	2021	Music Podcasts	Honoree	

== History ==
Cuchna graduated from California State University with a degree in music composition, and felt that contemporary music—specifically hip hop—was not receiving the academic analysis it deserved. The podcast debuted in August 2016 with Cuchna as the sole creator of the podcast, which he recorded at night after working a full-time job at a specialty coffee roasting company once his wife and kids had gone to sleep. In 2018, Cuchna began working with Spotify to produce the podcast. The podcast is on the The Ringer podcast network.

== Episode list ==
List of Dissect episodes
No. overall	No. in season	Title	Guests	Released	Duration	Notes
1	1	Compton, K.Dot/Kendrick Lamar	—	2016-08-23	0:21:10	—
2	2	good kid, m.A.A.d. city	—	2016-08-25	0:35:00	—
3	3	Wesley's Theory by Kendrick Lamar	—	2016-08-30	0:28:36	—
4	4	For Free? by Kendrick Lamar	—	2016-09-06	0:21:12	—
5	5	King Kunta by Kendrick Lamar	—	2016-09-13	0:25:47	—
6	6	Institutionalized by Kendrick Lamar	—	2016-09-20	0:30:21	—
7	7	These Walls by Kendrick Lamar	—	2016-09-27	0:22:36	—
8	8	u by Kendrick Lamar	—	2016-10-04	0:28:10	—
9	9	Alright by Kendrick Lamar	—	2016-10-11	0:34:34	—
10	10	For Sale? by Kendrick Lamar	—	2016-11-01	0:26:01	—
11	11	Momma by Kendrick Lamar	—	2016-11-08	0:30:24	—
12	12	Hood Politics by Kendrick Lamar	—	2016-11-15	0:31:00	—
13	13	How Much a Dollar Cost by Kendrick Lamar	—	2016-11-22	0:32:33	—
14	14	Complexion (A Zulu Love) by Kendrick Lamar	—	2016-12-06	0:31:48	—
15	15	Blacker the Berry (Part 1) by Kendrick Lamar	—	2016-12-13	0:31:53	—
16	16	Blacker the Berry (Part 2) by Kendrick Lamar	—	2016-12-20	0:28:39	—
17	17	You Ain't Gotta Lie (Momma Said) by Kendrick Lamar	—	2017-01-03	0:23:51	—
18	18	i (Part 1) by Kendrick Lamar	—	2017-01-13	0:29:27	—
19	19	i (Part 2) by Kendrick Lamar	—	2017-01-17	0:38:30	—
20	20	Mortal Man (Part 1) by Kendrick Lamar	—	2017-01-24	0:30:15	—
21	21	Mortal Man (Part 2) by Kendrick Lamar	—	2017-01-31	0:47:22	—
22	22	Season Finale: To Pimp a Butterfly	—	2017-02-07	1:10:43	—
23	1	Kanye West: Elephant in the Room	—	2017-08-01	0:35:50	—
24	2	Through the Wire by Kanye West	—	2017-08-08	0:30:30	—
25	3	The Old Kanye	—	2017-08-15	0:43:28	—
26	4	Dark Fantasy by Kanye West	—	2017-08-22	0:34:06	—
27	5	Gorgeous by Kanye West	—	2017-08-29	0:37:40	—
28	6	Power by Kanye West	—	2017-09-05	0:43:08	—
29	7	All of the Lights by Kanye West	—	2017-09-12	0:33:12	—
30	8	Kanye's Cry for Help	—	2017-09-19	0:15:41	—
31	9	Monster by Kanye West	—	2017-09-26	0:34:11	—
32	10	So Appalled by Kanye West	—	2017-10-03	0:35:42	—
33	11	Devil in a New Dress by Kanye West	—	2017-10-10	0:41:38	—
34	12	Runaway by Kanye West (Part 1)	—	2017-10-17	0:36:21	—
35	13	Runaway by Kanye West (Part 2)	—	2017-10-24	0:37:06	—
36	14	Hell of a Life by Kanye West	—	2017-11-07	0:36:03	—
37	15	Blame Game by Kanye West	—	2017-11-14	0:32:34	—
38	16	Lost in the World by Kanye West	—	2017-11-28	0:42:16	—
39	17	Season Finale: My Beautiful Dark Twisted Fantasy	—	2017-12-11	1:29:26	—
40	1	Frank Ocean: A Man of Art and Mystery	—	2018-05-22	0:39:59	—
41	2	Thinking About You by Frank Ocean	—	2018-05-29	0:33:47	—
42	3	Super Rich Kids by Frank Ocean	—	2018-06-05	0:35:17	—
43	4	Pyramids (Part 1) by Frank Ocean	—	2018-06-12	0:32:27	—
44	5	Pyramids (Part 2) by Frank Ocean	—	2018-06-19	0:22:28	—
45	6	Bad Religion by Frank Ocean	—	2018-06-26	0:32:03	—
46	7	Channel Orange Recap + 4 Years Gone	—	2018-07-03	0:39:24	—
47	Bonus	The Tricky Stewart Interview	Tricky Stewart	2018-07-10	0:53:06	—
48	8	Nikes by Frank Ocean	—	2018-07-17	0:31:29	—
49	9	Ivy by Frank Ocean	—	2018-07-24	0:26:06	—
50	10	Pink + White by Frank Ocean	—	2018-07-31	0:30:57	—
51	11	Solo by Frank Ocean	—	2018-08-07	0:41:52	—
52	12	Skyline To + Self Control by Frank Ocean	—	2018-08-14	0:46:03	—
53	13	Nights by Frank Ocean	—	2018-08-21	0:38:48	—
54	14	Solo (Reprise), Pretty Sweet, Close to You by Frank Ocean	—	2018-08-28	0:39:51	—
55	15	White Ferrari by Frank Ocean	—	2018-09-04	0:26:45	—
56	16	Seigfried by Frank Ocean	—	2018-09-11	0:38:32	—
57	17	Godspeed + Futura Free by Frank Ocean	—	2018-09-18	0:42:27	—
58	18	Season Finale: Blonde by Frank Ocean	—	2018-09-25	1:23:05	—
59	Bonus	S3 Listener Audio Montage	—	2018-11-06	1:35:32	—
60	1	Lauryn Hill: An Education	—	2018-11-06	0:44:55	—
61	2	"Lost Ones" and "Ex-Factor" by Lauryn Hill	—	2018-11-13	0:43:46	—
62	3	"To Zion" by Lauryn Hill	—	2018-11-20	0:42:44	—
63	4	"Doo Wop (That Thing)" by Lauryn Hill	—	2018-11-27	0:37:51	—
64	5	"Superstar" & "Final Hour" by Lauryn Hill	—	2018-12-04	0:43:32	—
65	6	"Forgive Them Father" (& more) by Lauryn Hill	—	2018-12-11	0:42:57	—
66	7	"Everything is Everything" by Lauryn Hill	—	2018-12-18	0:38:35	—
67	8	Finale: The Miseducation of Lauryn Hill	—	2018-12-24	0:44:33	—
68	1	Tyler the Creator: Flower Boy	—	2019-04-23	0:44:28	—
69	2	Foreword by Tyler, The Creator	—	2019-04-30	0:33:09	—
70	3	Where This Flower Blooms by Tyler, The Creator	—	2019-05-07	0:38:19	—
71	4	See You Again by Tyler, The Creator	—	2019-05-14	0:34:21	—
72	5	"Who Dat Boy" by Tyler, The Creator	—	2019-05-21	0:26:10	—
73	Bonus	Dissecting IGOR with Anthony Fantano	Anthony Fantano	2019-05-24	2:00:14	—
74	6	Pothole by Tyler, The Creator	—	2019-05-28	0:37:01	—
75	7	Garden Shed by Tyler, The Creator	—	2019-06-04	0:49:04	—
76	8	"Boredom" by Tyler, The Creator	—	2019-06-11	0:34:31	—
77	9	"I Ain't Got Time" by Tyler, The Creator	—	2019-06-18	0:30:06	—
78	10	"911 / Mr Lonely" by Tyler, The Creator	—	2019-06-25	0:37:18	—
79	11	November by Tyler, The Creator	—	2019-07-02	0:33:19	—
80	12	Glitter by Tyler, The Creator	—	2019-07-09	0:32:15	—
81	13	Season Finale: Flower Boy	—	2019-07-16	1:21:16	—
82	14	Epilogue: IGOR by Tyler, The Creator	—	2019-07-23	0:44:11	—
83	1	Kendrick Lamar: DAMN.	—	2019-10-08	0:41:59	—
84	2	TPAB as Preface to DAMN.	—	2019-10-10	0:33:36	—
85	3	BLOOD. by Kendrick Lamar	—	2019-10-15	0:43:15	—
86	4	DNA. (Part 1) by Kendrick Lamar	—	2019-10-22	0:38:35	—
87	5	DNA. (Part 2) by Kendrick Lamar	—	2019-10-24	0:30:30	—
88	6	YAH. by Kendrick Lamar	—	2019-10-29	0:39:18	—
89	Bonus	Dissecting JESUS IS KING w/ Femi Olutade	Femi Olutade	2019-11-01	2:02:53	—
90	7	ELEMENT. by Kendrick Lamar	—	2019-11-05	0:57:50	—
91	8	FEEL. by Kendrick Lamar	—	2019-11-12	0:38:15	—
92	9	LOYALTY. by Kendrick Lamar	—	2019-11-19	0:40:47	—
93	10	PRIDE. by Kendrick Lamar	—	2019-11-26	0:42:46	—
94	11	HUMBLE. by Kendrick Lamar	—	2019-12-03	0:41:51	—
95	12	LUST. by Kendrick Lamar	—	2019-12-10	0:51:41	—
96	13	LOVE. by Kendrick Lamar	—	2019-12-17	0:37:09	—
97	14	XXX. (Part 1) by Kendrick Lamar	—	2019-12-23	0:37:26	—
98	15	XXX. (Part 2) by Kendrick Lamar	—	2019-12-24	0:55:23	—
99	16	FEAR. (Part 1) by Kendrick Lamar	—	2019-12-30	0:55:09	—
100	17	FEAR. (Part 2) by Kendrick Lamar	—	2020-01-07	1:01:54	—
101	18	GOD. by Kendrick Lamar	—	2020-01-14	1:00:06	—
102	19	DUCKWORTH. by Kendrick Lamar	—	2020-01-21	0:51:41	—
103	20	Season Finale: DAMN. by Kendrick Lamar	—	2020-01-28	1:09:02	—
104	1	Beyoncé: LEMONADE	—	2020-04-23	0:43:44	—
105	2	Hold Up by Beyoncé	—	2020-04-28	0:39:19	—
106	Bonus	Titi & Cole visit the Louisiana Plantations in Lemonade	Titilayo Shodiya	2020-04-30	0:51:03	—
107	3	Don't Hurt Yourself by Beyoncé (feat. Jack White)	—	2020-05-05	0:45:22	—
108	4	Sorry by Beyoncé	—	2020-05-12	0:39:33	—
109	5	6 Inch by Beyoncé	—	2020-05-19	0:37:04	—
110	6	Daddy Lessons by Beyoncé	—	2020-05-26	0:44:41	—
111	Bonus	A Moment of Silence for George Floyd	—	2020-06-02	0:08:46	—
112	7	Love Drought by Beyoncé	—	2020-05-26	0:41:00	—
113	8	Sandcastles by Beyoncé	—	2020-06-09	0:33:56	—
114	9	Forward by Beyoncé	—	2020-06-09	0:38:48	—
115	10	Freedom by Beyoncé	—	2020-06-23	0:55:03	—
116	Bonus	Dope Labs is BACK!	—	2020-06-25	0:01:47	—
117	11	All Night by Beyoncé	—	2020-06-30	0:47:26	—
118	12	Formation by Beyoncé	—	2020-07-07	0:52:10	—
119	13	Season Finale: Lemonade by Beyoncé	—	2020-07-14	1:16:24	—

== See also ==
- Music podcast
- List of music podcasts
