= Self Control (Frank Ocean song) =

2016 song by Frank Ocean

Song by Frank Ocean

from the album Blonde
- Released: August 20, 2016
- Length: 4:09
- Label: Boys Don't Cry
- Producers: Frank Ocean; Jon Brion; Malay Ho

"Self Control" is a song by American R&B singer Frank Ocean. It is the seventh track on Ocean's second studio album, Blonde, released in 2016.

== Composition ==
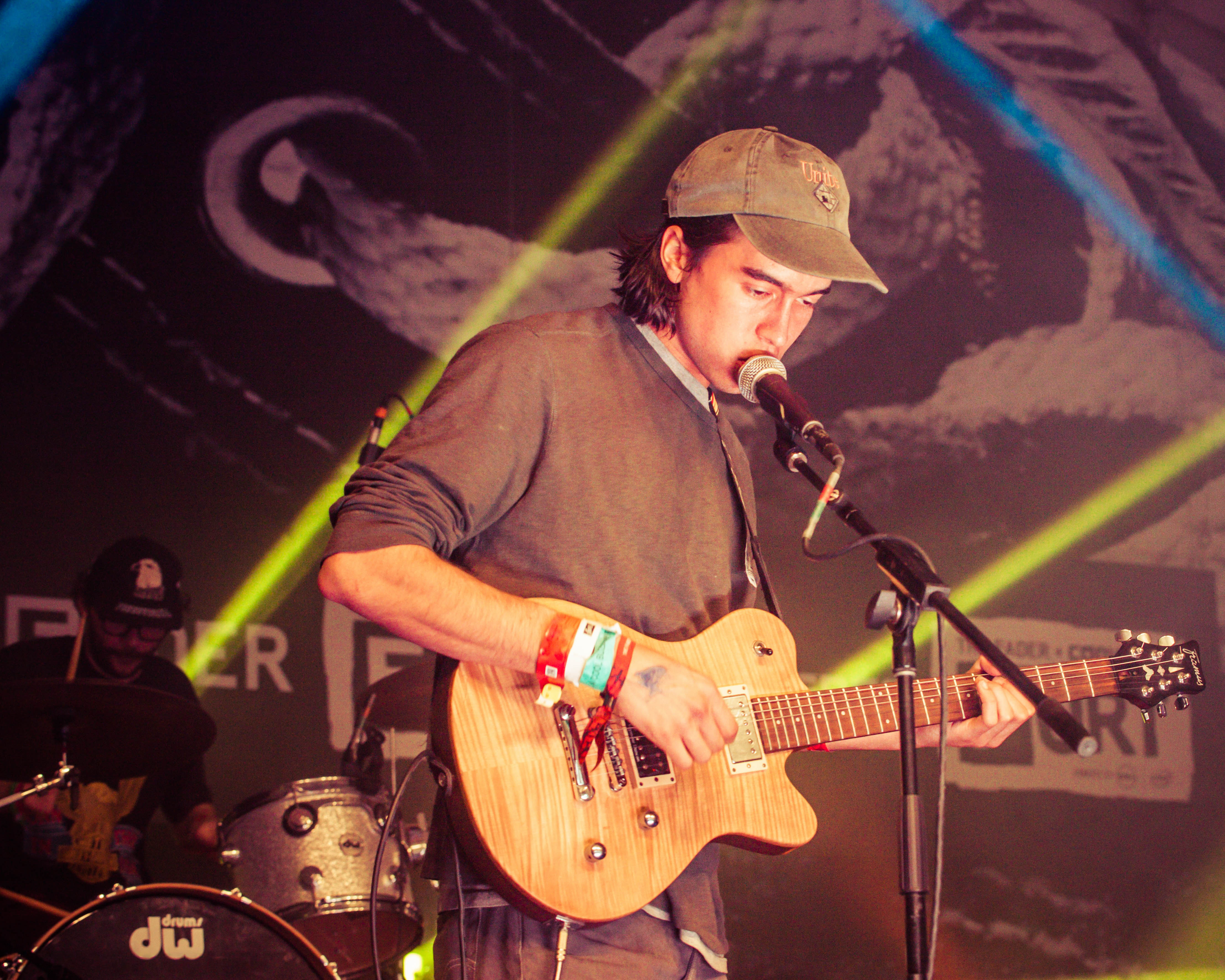
Alex G, who contributed guitars to "Self Control."

"Self Control" follows Ocean's difficulties in letting go with a lover. Ocean stated that the song was about a relationship in which mutual feelings were shared but "we couldn't really relate. We weren't really on the same wavelength." The track is built on a guitar melody and concludes with "a somber, quasi-orchestral swell" atop which Ocean "harmonizes with his own vocal overdubs."

The song features collaborations Alex G and Austin Feinstein of Slow Hollows. While he was on tour in the United Kingdom, Alex G frequently joined Ocean for recording sessions in both London and then Los Angeles, during which he recorded guitars for "White Ferrari" and also "Self Control." Meanwhile, Feinstein met Ocean through Tyler, the Creator and was soon asked to feature on a song; Feinstein was 19 at the time. He told Vice Media that Ocean had several versions of "Self Control" at the time, with different featured singers, but "It never really came together right." Ocean wanted a higher voice, from either a woman vocalist or Feinstein, after which Feinstein pitched up his own vocals: "And he actually liked it a lot. That was lucky." Ocean stated in The New York Times that he used a lot of different voices because "Sometimes I felt like you weren't hearing enough versions of me within a song."

== Critical reception ==
Complex ranked "Self Control" the third best song on Blonde, calling it full of sounds that "can make us cry" and "may be the closest anyone can get to actually ascending." Yahoo Entertainment called it the eleventh best Ocean song as of 2017.

UCLA Radio called the song Ocean's "finest musical prose on the feeling" of longing. DJBooth stated that "As usual, Frank lets his songwriting unfold and strike the way an unpleasant memory has the potential to seize us" and called it "the saddest and most desperate moment of the album because the more you sit with the song, the more you realize Frank Ocean is bleeding all over wax. He's trying to be coy and flit around the hurt, but there are no two ways around it—this situation fucking sucks."

Flood Magazine called the song "devastated confession of emotional surrogacy" and "one of many examples here of Ocean's unique gifts as a vocalist, which, true to contemporary production methods, have much more to do with the way he shapes his voice through technology than with his inherent tone and timbre. It's how he achieves the kinds of expressions an unaffected human voice seems almost incapable of matching."

Lindsay Zoladz, of The New York Times' The Amplifier, named "Self Control" as one of the songs that explain her, as an intro to the newsletter series: "here is the B-side of my roaring 20s: Frank Ocean's tender voice was and remains a balm for whatever failure, loneliness and disappointment life decided to throw my way."

== In popular culture ==
The song was featured in the 2026 film Leviticus.

== Personnel ==
- Frank Ocean — production, programming
- Alex Giannascoli — arrangement, guitars
- Austin Feinstein — arrangement, guitars
- Jon Brion — production, arrangement, string arrangement, keyboards
- Malay Ho — production, guitars

Strings were recorded by Greg Keller and Eric Caudieux at Henson Recording Studio. Led by Eric Gorfain as concertmaster, the violin section included: Daphne Chen, Marisa Kuney, Charlie Bisharat, Katie Sloan, Songa Lee, Gina Kronstadt, Lisa Dondlinger, Terry Glenny, Chris Woods, Neel Hammond, Marcy Vaj, and Crystal Alforque. The viola section included: Leah Katz, Rodney Wirtz, Stefan Smith, and Adriana Zoppo. The cello section included: John Krovoza, Simon Huber, Ginger Murphy, Alisha Bauer, and Stefanie Fife.

== Charts ==
Chart (2016)	Peak position
US Hot R&B Songs (Billboard)	15
