= Close to You (Frank Ocean song) =

2016 song by Frank Ocean

Song by Frank Ocean

from the album Blonde
- Released: August 20, 2016
- Genre: Synth-pop; trip hop
- Length: 1:25
- Label: Boys Don't Cry
- Producers: Frank Ocean; Buddy Ross; Francis Starlite

"Close to You" is a song by American R&B singer Frank Ocean. It is the eleventh track on Ocean's second studio album, Blonde, released in 2016. The song interpolates and samples various renditions of "(They Long to Be) Close to You" and was performed at FYF Fest in 2017 with a guest appearance from American actor Brad Pitt.

== Composition ==
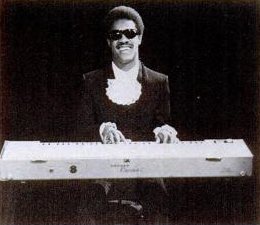
Wonder in 1972, the year he performed "(They Long to Be) Close to You" and "Never Can Say Goodbye" on live television

The song interpolates the melody of "(They Long to Be) Close to You", a song written by Burt Bacharach and Hal David, while using new lyrics written by Ocean, Joe Thornalley, and Michael Uzowuru. Ocean's voice is layered with audio effects. The song also incorporates a sample of Stevie Wonder's 1972 rendition of the song which was performed along with a rendition of the Jackson 5's "Never Can Say Goodbye" on The David Frost Show with a talk box and a backing band.

When asked how he chose and recorded cover songs, Ocean stated:

Nowadays, I have to live with the song for a bit and I have to see if it's worthwhile to interpret it first. To see what I can do with it, where I can insert my voice. In the past, I would just like a song and I wouldn't think about it as seriously as when I do 'Close to You' or 'Moon River' [from Breakfast at Tiffany's] or [Aaliyah's] 'At Your Best...' "With 'Close to You,' it was a similar thing, only without the nostalgia. I was living in a hotel, and I remember listening to it and being really nailed to the floor by Stevie Wonder's interpretation of it. That version moved into my favorite-songs-of-all-time list, right there with Prince's 'When You Were Mine.' I don't know what creates that feeling of 'I have to sing this song.'

== Live performance ==
In 2017, Ocean performed on the second day of FYF Fest, marking his first live performance in three years. There, before performing the song, Ocean stated that he first found Wonder's talk box cover of "(They Long to Be) Close to You" while he was living in hotel rooms and going down a "YouTube wormhole"; he proceeded to call it his favorite song ever. The subsequent performance was accompanied by an appearance from Brad Pitt who was live-recorded sitting down in the wings of the backstage while holding a cellphone up to his ear and "acting out a phone conversation while Ocean performed it." Similar to Wonder's talk box cover, Ocean performed both his interpolation of "(They Long to be) Close to You" as well as the Jackson 5's "Never Can Say Goodbye" in conjunction. On the giant screen behind Ocean, footage oscillated between camera views of Ocean himself and Pitt. Film director Spike Jonze was also present to film the performance. However, the only public footage of the performance documented online was recorded and uploaded by fans.

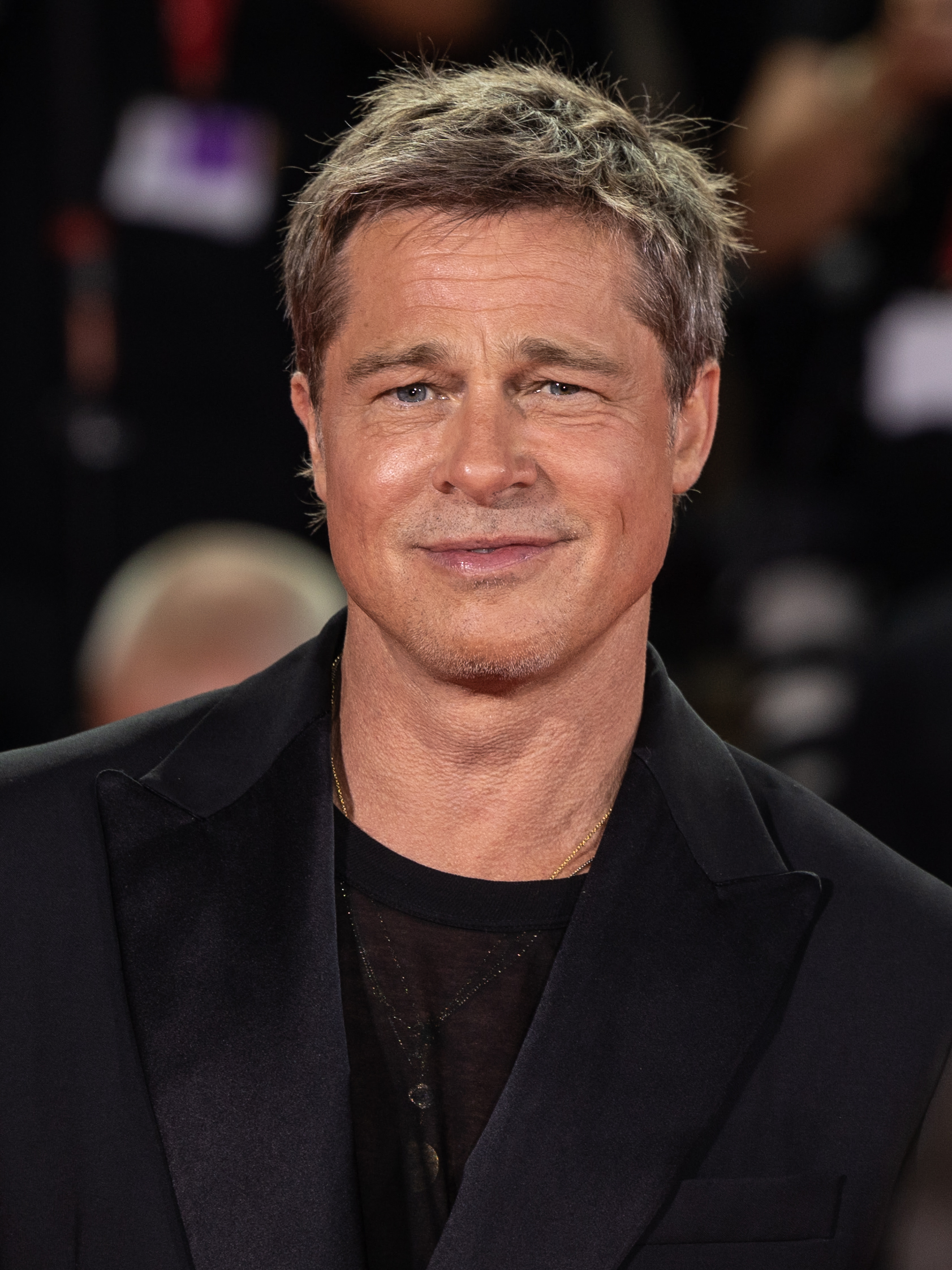
Pitt, who appeared during Ocean's FYF Fest set in 2017

Ariana Grande covered the song in 2019 and used it as an interlude for her fourth concert tour the Sweetener World Tour but was only used for leg 1 and was later replaced by Adore

=== Ocean and Pitt ===
In May 2017, Brad Pitt stated that Ocean's music was helping him through his split with Angelina Jolie, saying: "I've been listening to a lot of Frank Ocean. I find this young man so special. Talk about getting to the raw truth. He's painfully honest. He's very, very special. I can't find a bad one." Shortly after, Ocean was photographed wearing a shirt with Pitt's face on it which some critics saw as a reciprocal gesture of support. In September 2024, Pitt stated that "Seigfried" was his favorite Ocean song.

Several publications noted the ubiquity of Pitt's cameo at Ocean's FYF Fest set in July 2017 while also remarking on the nature of Ocean and Pitt's relationship. Los Angeles Daily News stated that the "internet went crazy". Refinery29 speculated on future collaborative projects between Ocean, Pitt, and Jonze. Of the musical, visual performance itself, Billboard wrote that "Ocean never acknowledged him. He may as well have been on a TV in the background." Time opined that "The dreamy, almost-too-perfect-to-be-true bromance between noted emotional boys Frank Ocean and Brad Pitt has reached new heights". XXL called it "a beautiful sight to see." W Magazine quipped that "We're not sure what the commentary was intended to be, but Pitt couldn't seem to say goodbye to whomever he was pretending to talk to." Grazia stated, "The strange part was Pitt was sitting side stage with a camera directed on him, both he and Ocean were projected out to the crowd. The actor was seemingly on the phone for the duration of the entire performance. Is this Pitt telling Jolie something? Or just riding out the pain of loving someone so hard?"

== Critical reception ==
Dave Hanratty, writing for Drowned in Sound, stated "Writing his own book, [Ocean] opts to rework Stevie Wonder's talk show version in a distorted 85-second snapshot of melancholy that cuts close to the heart." A reviewer in DJBooth compared the song's "brevity and relieved pain" to the love poems of Charles Bukowski and called it "the evolved version of channel ORANGE's 'End', showcasing the need for mercy during a breakup." The reviewer argued that the song possessed Ocean's usual means of romantic closure expressed in his previous songs by way of asking for said mercy and subsequently gaining release through writing.

== Personnel ==
- Frank Ocean — production, arrangement
- Buddy Ross — production, arrangement, additional programming, keyboards
- Francis Starlite — production, arrangement, vocoder
- Joe Thornalley — drum programming

== Charts ==
Chart (2016)	Peak position
US Hot R&B Songs (Billboard)	14

== Certifications ==
Certifications and sales for "Close to You"
Region	Certification	Certified units/sales
New Zealand (RMNZ)	Gold	15,000^{‡}
^{‡} Sales+streaming figures based on certification alone.
