= Solo (Reprise) =

Song by Frank Ocean

from the album Blonde
- Released: August 20, 2016
- Genre: Hip-hop; R&B
- Length: 1:18
- Label: Boys Don't Cry
- Songwriters: André 3000, James Blake & Frank Ocean
- Producers: Frank Ocean, James Blake & Jon Brion

"Solo (Reprise)" is the tenth track on American singer Frank Ocean's 2016 album Blonde. As the name suggests, it is the successor to the album's fourth track, "Solo". With a length of one minute and eighteen seconds, it is the second shortest track on the album, beaten only by "Facebook Story". The track features writing credits from Andre 3000, James Blake, and Frank Ocean, with production credits from Ocean, Blake, and Jon Brion. It is the only song off the album to feature no vocals from Frank Ocean himself, instead being performed entirely by rapper Andre 3000 of Outkast.

== Background ==
According to CeeLo Green in a 2016 interview with Sway's Universe, Andre 3000 recorded the lone verse to "Solo (Reprise)" back in 2014, two years before the release of Blonde. According to Andre 3000 himself, he did not know that he was on the album until the day it released. In a 2020 interview, Andre revealed, "Frank, he reached out actually about two or three years before Blonde came out and he was like, 'Hey, I wanna do this song.' So he sent me a beat and we kept back and forth, he was sending me beats, we were listening to music. I picked the beat and I went in the studio in Austin, Texas and I did this verse to this beat — it was like a Hip Hop kinda beat, a completely different track." This verse would go untouched for years until it appeared on the album, albeit with a different instrumental. Andre 3000 later describes his discovery that his verse made the final cut, stating "-we put the Blonde CD in, we're listening and like, 'Oh, this is jamming.' Then my voice comes on! Out of nowhere. He didn't tell us that it was coming out. I never heard it until it was on the album, and it was completely different. I laid it down to this whole beat and he took my verse from that beat and then — it was the genius of Frank — he put it on piano alone. No beat, just me and the piano."

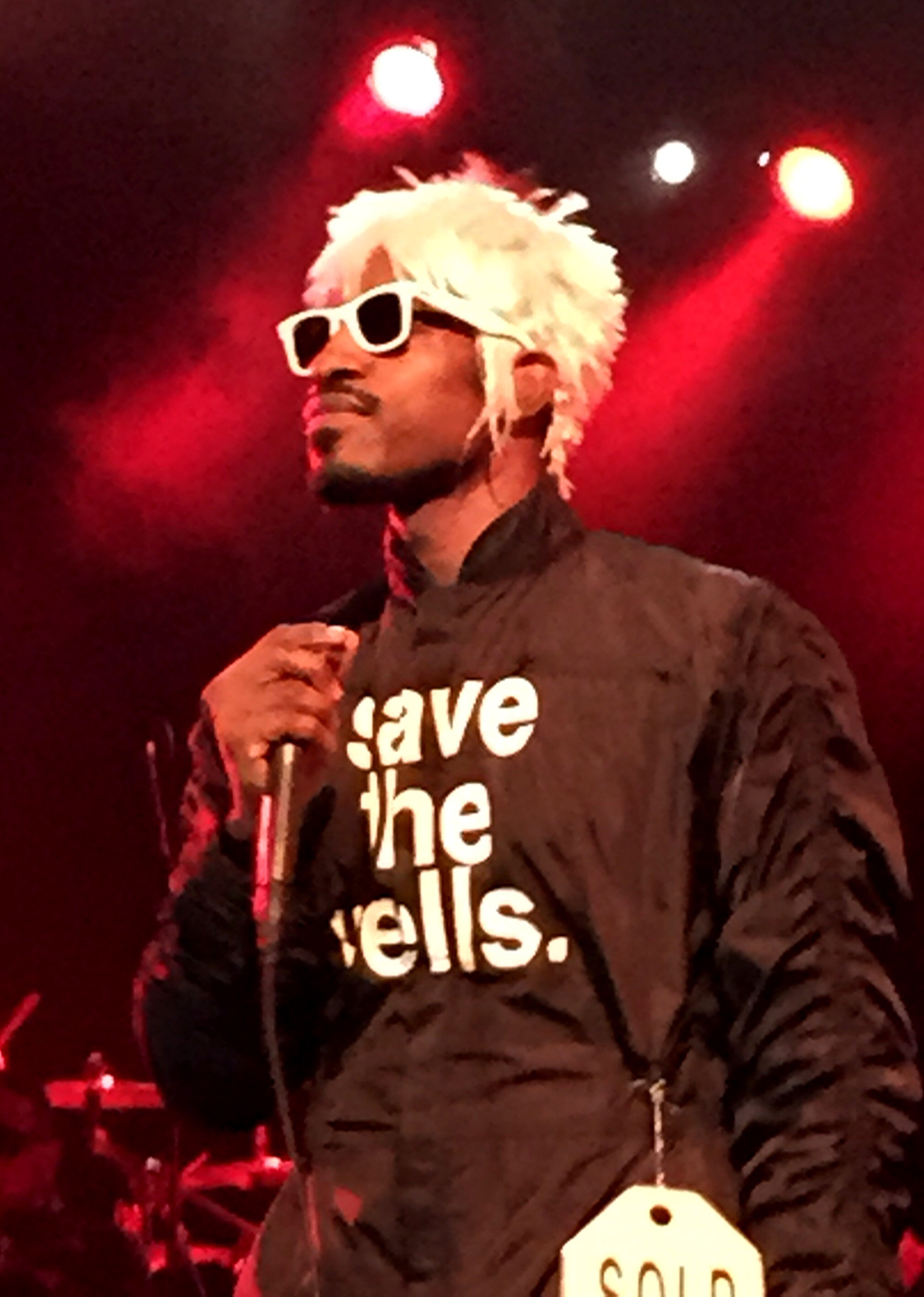
Andre 3000 in 2014, the year the verse to "Solo (Reprise)" was written

== Composition and themes ==
"Solo (Reprise)" shares many similarities with its counterpart "Solo". Both tracks feature vocals performed primarily under a single instrument. While "Solo" features a soft organ in its instrumental, the reprise replaces this with a faster, more aggressive piano to match Andre 3000's rapidly delivered lines. There is a brief shift in the instrumental in "Solo (Reprise)", with the piano replaced by abrasive low-frequency bass and sporadic beeping tones. This switch-up lasts only eight lines, and then the piano returns for the remainder of the track. "Solo (Reprise)" is in the G Minor key and is performed at eighty beats per minute.

Thematically, similar to "Solo", "Solo (Reprise)" centres on a double entendre of the word "solo", which has a dual meaning. The first meaning is the standard definition of solo: without a companion, or alone. The second meaning of solo in the song is a play on words of the term "so-low", referring to the emotional low associated with being alone.

Whereas "Solo" explores Ocean's experience with drugs as a coping mechanism for loneliness, the reprise shows Andre 3000 expressing his dissatisfaction with the current state of the world and the disillusionment with what he thought it meant to be an artist. Some themes addressed by Andre in his verse include alcohol abuse, police brutality towards young African Americans, the heavy influence of materialism in Hip Hop, fake body enhancements, and ghostwriting within the music industry.

Upon release, fans speculated that the lines, "After twenty years in, I'm so naive I was under the im—'Pression that everyone wrote they own verses. It's comin' back different, and yeah, that shit hurts me," was an attack aimed towards fellow rapper Drake, who has been alleged to not write his own songs ever since his 2015 feud with Meek Mill. In the same 2016 interview, CeeLo Green denied these speculations, stating "He was telling me that he did that verse like two years ago. [...] I can confirm that it's not [about Drake], but it's good for Hip-Hop."

== Reception ==
Chart (2016)	Peak position
UK Official Independent Singles Chart	33

Since its release, "Solo (Reprise)" has amassed over 98 million Spotify streams, and 2.5 million views on YouTube. The song has garnered a favourable reputation, with a user rating of 88/100 on Album of the Year based on over 3000 reviews. The track was ranked as the 12th best in the album by COMPLEX.

== Personnel ==
- Production: Frank Ocean, James Blake and Jon Brion
- Arrangement: James Blake and Jon Brion
- Keyboards: James Blake and Jon Brion
- Drum programming: Jon Brion
