= Buddy Ross =

American record producer (born 1983)

- Born: Josiah Sherman; March 4, 1983 (age 43); Kelso, Washington, United States
- Origin: Kelso, Washington, U.S.
- Genres: Indie pop; indie folk; indie rock; R&B; electronic; hip hop
- Occupations: Record producer; songwriter; keyboardist; audio mixer; audio engineer
- Years active: 1999–present
- Label: PLZ Make It Ruins
- Formerly of: Motopony

Josiah Sherman (born March 4, 1983), known professionally as Buddy Ross, is an American record producer, keyboardist, songwriter, and audio engineer from Washington. He is best known for his work with Frank Ocean, having produced on his albums Blonde (2016) and Endless (2016), as well as his singles "Provider" and "Moon River". Ross has also written or produced material for artists including Bon Iver, Travis Scott, Lorde, Vampire Weekend, Miley Cyrus, Haim, Arlo Parks, Fred Again, Wet, Banks, and Troye Sivan, among others.

Ross produced, mixed and played piano on Vampire Weekend's 2019 Father of the Bride (2019), which won a Grammy Award. He co-wrote "Jelmore" with Justin Vernon from Bon Iver's Grammy-nominated album i,i (2019), and was a co-writer and producer on "I Know Alone" from Haim's Grammy-nominated album Women in Music Pt. III (2020). In 2023, he produced several songs on Travis Scott's fourth album, Utopia.

In 2020, he released his debut single as a lead artist, "Bored Again."

== Career ==
In 2009, Ross produced and mixed his first album with Tacoma, Washington artist Daniel Blue. Together they formed the band Motopony and released their self-titled debut album in 2009; they were later signed by TinyOGRE in 2011. They toured the United States extensively from 2010 to 2012. Motopony's self-titled debut charted at #1 on KCRW and on the CMJ 200 chart in 2011. In 2012, as they were in the process of recording their second album, Ross received a call from Motopony's former tour manager requesting he fly down to Los Angeles to try out for Frank Ocean’s band prior to the release of his Channel Orange album, as well as one week before the tour would commence. After landing the position as Ocean's keyboardist, Ross performed on the Channel Orange tour and live on SNL with Ocean and John Mayer that same year. He would ultimately leave Motopony to continue to tour with Ocean through 2017.

In 2013, Ocean brought Ross to the studio to write and play keyboards on his critically acclaimed albums Blonde and Endless. He sampled Ross's song "Running Around" as the recurring theme to Blonde on the songs "Be Yourself", "Good Guy", "Facebook Story", and "Futura Free". In 2014, Ocean released a voice memo as his first follow up song to Channel Orange titled "Memrise" on Ocean's Tumblr. "Memrise" was co-written with and produced by Ross. In 2017, Ross music directed and played keyboards for the nine Frank Ocean festival headlining slots in support of Blonde. While on that tour, Ross and Ocean co-wrote and co-produced "Provider" from their hotel rooms.

Ross would later go on to write, produce, play keys and mix for artists including Vampire Weekend, HAIM, Vegyn, Carly Rae Jepsen, Troye Sivan, WET amongst others.

In 2023, Ross collaborated as a writer and producer on 5 tracks featured in Travis Scott's studio album Utopia, which debuted at No.1 on Billboard 200: "My Eyes," "Sirens," "I Know ?," "Parasail", and "Looove." All five songs made their debut on the Billboard Hot 100 chart. Ross also attained a position on Billboard's Hot 100 Songwriters, reaching a peak rank of No. 21.

In 2024, Ross was nominated for an Ivor Novello Award (Best Contemporary Song) for his contribution to the song "Enough" as performed by Fred Again and Brian Eno.

In 2025, he contributed to Lorde's album Virgin, which debuted at number two on the Billboard 200.

As an artist, Buddy Ross has released four singles; "Running Around" in 2016, "Green Light" and "Bored Again!" in 2020 (released through Vegyn's label PLZ Make It Ruins), and "WURMPLE" in 2024, released under his own label, Bored Again!

== Personal life ==
Ross was born and raised in Kelso, Washington. He studied classical piano from age 5 to 15 and began composing piano music at the age of 9 before he transitioned to electronic music in his mid teens.

Ross resides in Los Angeles.

== Discography ==
=== Singles ===
Title	Year	Label
"Running Around"	2016	—N/a
"Bored Again" (featuring Gabriel Delicious)	2020	PLZ Make It Ruins
"Green Light"	2020	PLZ Make It Ruins
"Menthol (Remix)"	2022	—N/a
"WURMPLE"	2024	Bored Again!
"carkol"	2025	Bored Again!

=== Songwriting and production discography ===
List of songs co-written, featuring production involvement, instrumentation, vocals, arrangement, engineering, and/or mixing for other artists, showing year released and album name
Title	Year	Artist	Album	Credit(s)
"June"	2011	Motopony	Motopony	Writer, producer, engineer, mixer, keyboards
"King of Diamonds"	2011	Motopony	Motopony	Writer, producer, engineer, mixer, keyboards
"Seer"	2011	Motopony	Motopony	Writer, producer, engineer, mixer, keyboards
"I Am My Body"	2011	Motopony	Motopony	Writer, producer, engineer, mixer, keyboards
"Vetiver"	2011	Motopony	Motopony	Writer, producer, engineer, mixer, keyboards
"Intro"	2011	Motopony	Motopony	Writer, producer, engineer, mixer, keyboards
"God Damn Girl"	2011	Motopony	Motopony	Writer, producer, engineer, mixer, keyboards
"Wait For Me"	2011	Motopony	Motopony	Writer, producer, engineer, mixer, keyboards
"27"	2011	Motopony	Motopony	Writer, producer, engineer, mixer, keyboards
"Euphoria"	2011	Motopony	Motopony	Writer, producer, engineer, mixer, keyboards
"I'm Here Now (Bonus Track)"	2011	Motopony	Motopony	Writer, producer, engineer, mixer, keyboards
"Magnificent Defeat"	2013	Josh White	Pilgrim	Producer, engineer, mixer, keyboards
"Outrageous"	2013	Josh White	Pilgrim	Producer, engineer, mixer, keyboards
"Surrender"	2013	Josh White	Pilgrim	Producer, engineer, mixer, keyboards
"I've Been Surprised"	2013	Josh White	Pilgrim	Producer, engineer, mixer, keyboards
"Forgive"	2013	Josh White	Pilgrim	Producer, engineer, mixer, keyboards
"Only Your Presence"	2013	Josh White	Pilgrim	Producer, engineer, mixer, keyboards
"One Drop"	2013	Josh White	Pilgrim	Producer, engineer, mixer, keyboards
"Fills The Skies"	2013	Josh White	Pilgrim	Producer, engineer, mixer, keyboards
"Final Word"	2013	Josh White	Pilgrim	Producer, engineer, mixer, keyboards
"Faith Facing The Dark"	2013	Josh White	Pilgrim	Producer, engineer, mixer, keyboards
"Memrise"	2014	Frank Ocean	Non-album single	Writer, producer, engineer, mixer, keyboards
"Get Down"	2014	Motopony	Idle Beauty (EP)	Writer, co-producer, engineer, keyboards
"About A Song"	2014	Motopony	Idle Beauty (EP)	Writer, co-producer, engineer, keyboards
"Buffalo Song"	2014	Motopony	Idle Beauty (EP)	Writer, co-producer, engineer, keyboards
"She Is Spirit"	2014	Motopony	Idle Beauty (EP)	Writer, co-producer, engineer, keyboards
"Breakthru (Bonus Track)"	2014	Motopony	Idle Beauty (EP)	Writer, producer, engineer, keyboards
"Welcome You"	2015	Motopony	Welcome You	Writer
"Daylights Gone"	2015	Motopony	Welcome You	Writer
"Molly"	2015	Motopony	Welcome You	Writer
"Abide"	2015	Liz Vice	There's A Light	Producer, mixer, keyboards
"Empty Me Out"	2015	Liz Vice	There's A Light	Producer, mixer, keyboards
"Entrance"	2015	Liz Vice	There's A Light	Producer, mixer, keyboards
"The Source"	2015	Liz Vice	There's A Light	Producer, mixer, keyboards
"Truly Today"	2015	Liz Vice	There's A Light	Producer, mixer, keyboards
"Pure Religion"	2015	Liz Vice	There's A Light	Producer, mixer, keyboards
"Everything Is Yours"	2015	Liz Vice	There's A Light	Producer, mixer, keyboards, vocals
"All Must Be Well"	2015	Liz Vice	There's A Light	Producer, mixer, keyboards
"Enclosed By You"	2015	Liz Vice	There's A Light	Producer, mixer, keyboards
"There's A Light"	2015	Liz Vice	There's A Light	Producer, mixer, keyboards
"Mine"	2016	Frank Ocean	Endless	Producer, keyboards
"U-N-I-T-Y"	2016	Frank Ocean	Endless	Keyboards
"Comme des Garçons"	2016	Frank Ocean	Endless	Producer, keyboards
"Slide on Me"	2016	Frank Ocean	Endless	Keyboards
"Sideways"	2016	Frank Ocean	Endless	Producer, keyboards
"Florida"	2016	Frank Ocean	Endless	Bass, keyboards
"Rushes"	2016	Frank Ocean	Endless	Keyboards
"Be Yourself"	2016	Frank Ocean	Blonde	Writer, producer, engineer, keyboards
"Nights"	2016	Frank Ocean	Blonde	Producer, keyboards
"Pretty Sweet"	2016	Frank Ocean	Blonde	Bass
"Facebook Story"	2016	Frank Ocean	Blonde	Writer, producer, engineer, keyboards
"Close to You"	2016	Frank Ocean	Blonde	Writer, producer, engineer, keyboards
"White Ferrari"	2016	Frank Ocean	Blonde	Keyboards, arranger
"Godspeed"	2016	Frank Ocean	Blonde	Piano
"Interviews"	2016	Frank Ocean	Blonde	Writer, producer, engineer, keyboards
"In a Blackout" (Buddy Ross Remix)	2016	Hamilton Leithauser & Rostam	Non-album single	Remixer
"Into The Dark"	2016	Night Sea	Into The Dark	Producer, engineer, mixer, keyboards
"Lost In The Tunnel"	2016	Night Sea	Into The Dark	Producer, engineer, mixer, keyboards
"Drift Away"	2016	Night Sea	Into The Dark	Producer, engineer, mixer, keyboards
"Gold"	2016	Night Sea	Into The Dark	Producer, engineer, mixer, keyboards
"Last Light"	2016	Night Sea	Into The Dark	Producer, engineer, mixer, keyboards
"Biking" (featuring Jay-Z & Tyler, the Creator)	2017	Frank Ocean	Non-album single	Bass
"Provider"	2017	Frank Ocean	Non-album single	Writer, producer, engineer, keyboards
"Un-named"	2017	Cosima	Un-named	Additional production, engineer, keyboards
"Sweet Hell"	2017	Maiah Manser	Second Skin EP	Producer, engineer, mixer, keyboards
"Top of My Lungs"	2017	Maiah Manser	Second Skin EP	Producer, engineer, mixer, keyboards
"Second Skin"	2017	Maiah Manser	Second Skin EP	Writer, producer, engineer, mixer, keyboards
"Want You Back"	2017	Haim	Something to Tell You	Keyboards
"Right Now"	2017	Haim	Something to Tell You	Keyboards
"Nothing's Wrong"	2017	Haim	Something to Tell You	Keyboards
"Something to Tell You"	2017	Haim	Something to Tell You	Keyboards
"You Never Knew"	2017	Haim	Something to Tell You	Keyboards
"Don't You Pretend"	2017	Kelly Clarkson	Meaning of Life	Piano
"Meaning of Life"	2017	Kelly Clarkson	Meaning of Life	Organ
"Love So Soft"	2017	Kelly Clarkson	Meaning of Life	Organ
"Moon River"	2018	Frank Ocean	Non-album single	Producer, keyboards
"Animal"	2018	Troye Sivan	Bloom	Writer, producer, engineer, keyboards
"Somebody" (featuring Noonie Bao)	2018	Jim-E Stack	Non-album single	Additional production, engineer, keyboards
"Spiritual"	2018	Mereki	Non-album single	Producer, engineer, mixer, keyboards
"Dip My Toe"	2018	Rae Morris	Someone Out There	Writer
"There's a Reason"	2018	Wet	Still Run	Keyboards
"Out of Tune"	2018	Wet	Still Run	Keyboards
"Ruby"	2018	Gaika	Basic Volume	Writer, producer, engineer, mixer, keyboards
"Doll"	2018	Maiah Manser	Non-album single	Writer
"Nobody"	2019	Hozier	Wasteland, Baby!	Keyboards, organ
"To Noise Making (Sing)"	2019	Hozier	Wasteland, Baby!	Keyboards, piano
"Sing It Louder"	2019	Intellexual	Intellexual	Keyboards
"Call You"	2019	Intellexual	Intellexual	Keyboards
"Harmony Hall"	2019	Vampire Weekend	Father of the Bride	Keyboards
"Unbearably White"	2019	Vampire Weekend	Father of the Bride	Keyboards
"Spring Snow"	2019	Vampire Weekend	Father of the Bride	Piano, keyboards
"My Mistake"	2019	Vampire Weekend	Father of the Bride	Producer, engineer, mixer, keyboards, vocals
"Jerusalem, New York, Berlin"	2019	Vampire Weekend	Father of the Bride	Producer, engineer, keyboards
"The Most"	2019	Miley Cyrus	She Is Coming	Additional production, engineer, keyboards, programming
"Gimme"	2019	Banks	III	Writer, keyboards
"Sawzall"	2019	Banks	III	Writer, producer, engineer, keyboards
"Hawaiian Mazes"	2019	Banks	III	Writer, producer, engineer, keyboards
"Alaska"	2019	Banks	III	Writer, producer, engineer, keyboards
"Propaganda"	2019	Banks	III	Keyboards, programming
"If We Were Made of Water"	2019	Banks	III	Keyboards
"What About Love"	2019	Banks	III	Writer, producer, engineer, keyboards
"iMi"	2019	Bon Iver	I, I	Keyboards
"Holyfields,"	2019	Bon Iver	I, I	Keyboards
"Hey, Ma"	2019	Bon Iver	I, I	Keyboards
"Jelmore"	2019	Bon Iver	I, I	Writer, keyboards
"Faith"	2019	Bon Iver	I, I	Keyboards
"Salem"	2019	Bon Iver	I, I	Keyboards
"Sh'Diah"	2019	Bon Iver	I, I	Keyboards
"RABi"	2019	Bon Iver	I, I	Keyboards
"Heartbeat"	2020	Carly Rae Jepsen	Dedicated Side B	Producer, piano, keyboards
"Now I'm In It"	2020	Haim	Women in Music Pt. III	Bass
"I Know Alone"	2020	Haim	Women in Music Pt. III	Writer, producer, engineer, keyboards, programming
"The Steps"	2020	Haim	Women in Music Pt. III	Organ
"Another Try"	2020	Haim	Women in Music Pt. III	Keyboards
"Wishin' You Better"	2020	Denai Moore	Modern Dread	Writer
"Zillionaire"	2020	The Aces	Under My Influence	Keyboards
"Harbor"	2020	Lupin	Lupin	Keyboards
"Jeanie" (featuring Bon Iver)	2020	Jim-E Stack	Ephemera	Writer, producer, keyboards
"One Shot" (featuring bearface)	2020	Jim-E Stack	Ephemera	Writer, producer, keyboards
"Hard Candy Christmas"	2020	Amber Coffman	Hard Candy Christmas	Producer, engineer, mixer, piano
"On Your Side"	2021	Wet	Letter Blue	Writer, producer, engineer, mixer, keyboards
"Clementine"	2021	Wet	Letter Blue	Additional production, engineer, keyboards
"Blades of Grass"	2021	Wet	Letter Blue	Writer, producer, engineer, mixer, keyboards
"The Letter Blue"	2021	Wet	Letter Blue	Writer, producer, engineer, mixer, keyboards
"Larabar"	2021	Wet	Letter Blue	Writer, producer, engineer, mixer, keyboards
"Come On World, You Can't Go!"	2021	Frank Ocean	Non-album single	Writer
"New Earth"	2022	Cass McCombs	Heartmind	Producer, engineer, keyboards
"Belong To Heaven"	2022	Cass McCombs	Heartmind	Organ
"Lost Track"	2022	Haim	Non-album single	Keyboards
"Letter Blue (Reprise)"	2022	Wet	Letter Blue (Reprise) EP	Writer, producer, engineer, mixer, keyboards
"Island"	2023	Miley Cyrus	Endless Summer Vacation	Keyboards
"I'm Sorry"	2023	Arlo Parks	My Soft Machine	Writer, producer, engineer, keyboards, programming
"Puppy"	2023	Arlo Parks	My Soft Machine	Writer, producer, engineer, keyboards, programming
"Room (Red Wings)"	2023	Arlo Parks	My Soft Machine	Writer, producer, engineer, keyboards, programming
"Enough"	2023	Fred Again & Brian Eno	Secret Life	Writer, producer, engineer, keyboards
"My Eyes"	2023	Travis Scott	Utopia	Writer, producer, keyboards
"Parasail" (featuring Yung Lean and Dave Chappelle)	2023	Travis Scott	Utopia	Writer, producer, keyboards
"Sirens"	2023	Travis Scott	Utopia	Writer, additional producer, keyboards
"I Know ?"	2023	Travis Scott	Utopia	Writer, additional producer, keyboards
"Looove" (featuring Kid Cudi)	2023	Travis Scott	Utopia	Additional producer, keyboards
"I'm Sorry" (featuring Lous and the Yakuza)	2024	Arlo Parks	My Soft Machine	Writer, producer
"Deep In The Water"	2024	Don Toliver	Hardstone Psycho	Writer, producer, keyboards
"5 to 10"	2024	Don Toliver	Hardstone Psycho	Writer, producer, keyboards
"Stand By Me"	2024	Max Frost	Non-album single	Writer, producer
"Animal"	2024	star boy	CEO	Writer, producer
"Doormat"	2024	Allie Kelly	Non-album single	Writer, producer
"Rid of Me"	2024	Still Woozy	Loveseat	Additional production
"Little Things"	2024	Still Woozy	Loveseat	Additional production
"Good Books"	2024	Lola Young	This Wasn't Meant for You Anyway	Writer, producer
"Suzette"	2025	Nami	Non-album single	Writer
"Go Outside"	2025	Alessia Cara	Love & Hyperbole	Writer, producer
"Coffee In The Morning"	2025	Wet	Two Lives	Writer, producer
"Rosy"	2025	Wet	Two Lives	Writer, keyboards
"Close Range"	2025	Wet	Two Lives	Writer, producer
"Double"	2025	Wet	Two Lives	Writer, producer
"Shut My Eyes"	2025	Wet	Two Lives	Writer, producer
"Float"	2025	Wet	Two Lives	Producer, synthesizer, drug programming
"Higher than the Sun"	2025	Wet	Two Lives	Producer, synthesizer
"Swinub"	2025	Wet	Two Lives	Writer, producer
"Soon to be Moon"	2025	Wet	Two Lives	Writer, producer
"Candy"	2025	Banks	Off with Her Head	Writer, producer
"Grave News"	2025	Elmiene	For the Deported	Writer, producer
"Pavement"	2025	Mallrat	Light Hit My Face Like a Straight Right	Writer, producer
"I Think It's You"	2025	Aminé	13 Months of Sunshine	Writer, producer
"Cool About It" (featuring Lido)	2025	Aminé	13 Months of Sunshine	Writer, producer
"Familiar"	2025	Aminé	13 Months of Sunshine	Writer, producer
"Temptations"	2025	Aminé	13 Months of Sunshine	Writer, producer
"Changer" (featuring chlothegod)	2025	Aminé	13 Months of Sunshine	Writer, producer
"Happy Head"	2025	Obongjayar	Paradise Now	Writer, producer
"Relationships"	2025	Haim	Single	Writer, producer, programming
"GRWM"	2025	Lorde	Virgin	Producer, synthesizer, programming
"Hammer"	2025	Lorde	Virgin	Additional producer, keyboards, synthesizer
"If She Could See Me Now"	2025	Lorde	Virgin	Synthesizer
"What We On"	2025	JID and Don Toliver	God Does Like Ugly	Writer, producer
"Baby!"	2025	Dijon	Baby	Writer, piano
"Yamaha"	2025	Dijon	Baby	Synthesizer
"Better Man"	2025	Justin Bieber	Swag II	Writer, producer
