= Motopony =

American indie rock band

- Origin: Tacoma, Washington
- Genres: Indie rock; alternative rock
- Years active: 2008–present
- Members: Daniel Blue; Joseph DeNatale; Timothy Graham; Gabriel Molinaro
- Past members: Brantley Cady; Buddy Ross; Mike Notter; Thomas Williams
- Website: http://www.motoponymusic.com

Motopony is a Seattle-based alt-psych band led by singer Daniel Blue. With the success of their previous full-length albums and a recording journey to the iconic Abbey Road Studios, Motopony has toured around the world playing festivals including SXSW, India's NH-7 Weekender and Bumbershoot, with U.S. tours and dates all across the UK.

Since their debut, Motopony's music has been featured on shows like HBO's Hung, How to Make It in America, Fox's House and USA's Suits.

== History ==
Motopony began with singer, songwriter and musician Daniel Blue. One night, mourning an anniversary of the death of his late mother, Blue found solace in learning to play the guitar. After this, he decided to throw everything he had into making music. He closed his event space and warehouse, sold his burgeoning fashion design business, disavowed himself of nearly all possessions and began couchsurfing so that all of his time could be devoted to learning the craft of music. Within a year Daniel partnered with a local hip-hop producer named Buddy Ross and an eponymous glitch-folk album emerged.

=== Motopony (2009) ===
Their self-titled debut album was self-released on November 14, 2009. Shortly after, they began gaining media attention when they were featured on the cover of Tacoma's Weekly Volcano. and their album was placed in rotation on Seattle's public radio station KEXP-FM. Their song "Seer" was later featured on KEXP's "Song of the Day" podcast. The band followed up with a 5-song EP titled Idle Beauty in 2014.

=== Welcome You (2015) ===
Motopony returned with their second full-length album Welcome You. The band teamed up with producer Mike McCarthy (Spoon, White Rabbits) and released singles "Daylights Gone" and "1971." In October 2015, the band released Naked at the Abbey (Live at Abbey Road), an EP with songs recorded live from a November 2014 trip to the iconic Abbey Road Studios.

=== New Album – Present ===
Blue and company have been hard at work crafting new music including a collaboration with electronic group Pegboard Nerds titled "Free." When the chart-topping duo brought the band a trance remix of the previously unreleased Motopony tune, something was re-awakened in Daniel and he realized Americana, indie-folk and blues could only offer his dancing feet brief, 2-step opportunities to incorporate into the spirit of his songs. It was then they began to realize their message as a band wouldn't be destroyed by an easy, danceable beat. "Free" – Pegboard Nerds x Motopony is out August 25, 2017.

Motopony are currently working on their third full-length album.

== Discography ==
- 2009 – Motopony (self-released)
- 2013 – Idle Beauty [EP] (Entertainment One)
- 2015 – Welcome You (eOne Music)
- 2015 – Naked at the Abbey (Live at Abbey Road)

== Members ==
- Daniel Blue: vocals, guitar
- Joseph DeNatale
- Timothy Graham
- Gabriel Molinaro
- Forrest Mauvais
