= Fear (Kendrick Lamar song) =

Song by Kendrick Lamar

from the album Damn
- Released: April 14, 2017
- Recorded: March 2017
- Genre: West Coast hip-hop
- Length: 7:41
- Label: Top Dawg; Aftermath; Interscope
- Songwriters: Kendrick Duckworth; Daniel Maman
- Producers: The Alchemist; Bēkon (add.)

"Fear" (stylized as "FEAR.") is a song by American rapper Kendrick Lamar, from his fourth studio album Damn, released on April 14, 2017. The twelfth track on the album (third on the Collector's Edition of Damn), the song was written by Kendrick and produced by The Alchemist, with additional production by Bēkon. At seven minutes and forty-one seconds, it is the longest song on the album. Although not released as a single, the song charted in multiple countries in 2017.

The song, structured in three parts, describes events in Lamar's life, specifically his worries and fears, at the ages of seven, seventeen, twenty-seven, and at the time of recording. The song has received critical acclaim from music critics, with multiple critics calling the track Damn's centerpiece, as well as a huge standout.

Although the song was not released as a single, the song made it onto 6 charts, including the Billboard Hot 100, where it hit number 50, and the Hot Rap Songs chart, where the song earned its highest position, hitting number 23. The song was also earned gold certifications by three organizations, including the Recording Industry Association of America (RIAA) based in the United States, where the song sold 500,000 units.

== Composition ==
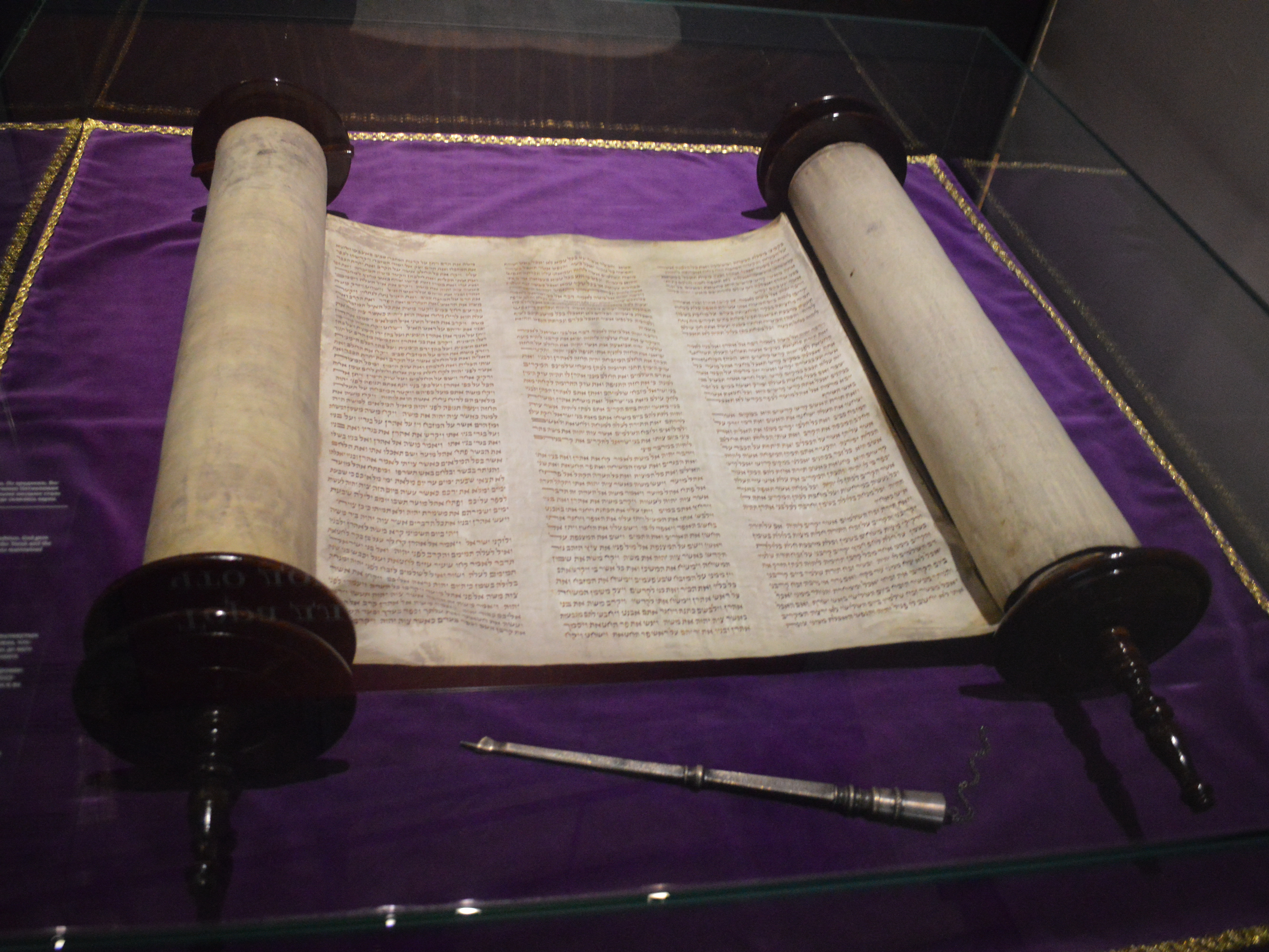
The voicemail at the beginning of the song recounts a verse from the Torah (pictured), the first five books of the Hebrew Bible. The Book of Deuteronomy is specifically referenced.

The song begins with a voicemail from Lamar's cousin, Karni Israel Duckworth (then Carl Duckworth), who, in the voicemail, speaks a verse from the Book of Deuteronomy, the fifth book of the Torah (a section of the Hebrew Bible). Specifically, he recites Deuteronomy 28:28, which reads "The LORD will smite thee with madness, and with blindness, and with astonishment of heart." Duckworth, a member of the Black Hebrew Israelites, refers to the burden that Lamar feels as a result of not accepting his supposed Israeli heritage. As Duckworth mentions in his second voicemail to Lamar at the end of the song:

"The so-called Blacks, Hispanics, and Native American Indians are the true children of Israel. We are the Israelites, according to the Bible. The children of Israel. He's gonna punish us for our iniquities, for our disobedience because we chose to follow other gods”

Though it is unclear how much of this logic Lamar chooses to follow, he notes in another track on the album, "Yah", that “I’m an Israelite, don’t call me Black no more,” indicating sympathy towards the movement. Following Duckworth's voicemail, the first verse sees Lamar exploring the fear he experienced as a young child with a strict mother. The second verse sees Lamar exploring his teen years expressing his fear of dying at a young age. This is enforced with the gang banging and police brutality of Compton, CA. The third verse sees Lamar exploring the anxieties he showed on his third studio album To Pimp a Butterfly. These anxieties include his lack of self-confidence in himself and his abilities, as well as the fear of losing the life he has built for himself. At the near end of the song, the beat switches and there's another verse from Carl Duckworth, a continuation of the verse in the first voicemail. Upon explaining its meaning, he ends with the Hebrew word, "shalom" meaning "peace" and "goodbye" (or greetings).

== Lyrics ==
The song contains "backwards vocals", also known as backmasking, or "reverse vocals". The backmasked lyrics have been described as the lyrics to the song's refrain in reverse. They appear midway through the song and occur for twenty seconds to represent Lamar going back to his childhood.

The backmasked lyrics, played forwards, reads as follows:

Every stone thrown at you restin' at my feet
Why God, why God do I gotta suffer?
Pain in my heart carry burdens full of struggle
Why God, why God do I gotta bleed?
Every stone thrown at you restin' at my feet
Why God, why God do I gotta suffer?
Earth is no more, why don't you burn this muhfucka?

== Critical reception ==
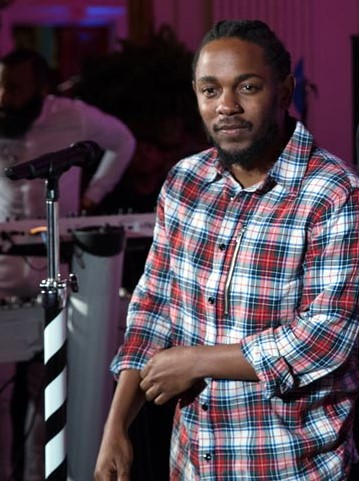
Lamar himself believes "Fear" contains some of the best lyrics he's ever written.

The song has received critical acclaim from music critics, with multiple critics describing "Fear" as Damn's centerpiece. Sydney Sweeney of Atwood Magazine called "Fear" a contemplative standout on Damn. Maeve McDermott of USA Today said that with "Fear", "the album's purpose solidifies beyond its political statements, showing a portrait of an artist terrified of failure, in the eyes of his community, his peers and himself. Ryan Alfieri of DJBooth named the track as "one of [the] countless number of standout selections from his newly released opus." Writer Yoh of DJBooth described "Fear" as "the most important song on [Damn]".

Several critics have described the song's structure as similar to the 2017 Academy Award for Best Picture-winning film Moonlight, specifically how Moonlight follows a character in three sections – childhood, adolescence, and adulthood. Because of this, Patrick Lyons of Merry Jane called Lamar "the best storyteller in hip-hop". Lawrence Burney of Vice has compared the song to Lamar's "Momma", from 2015's To Pimp a Butterfly, a track that also explores Lamar's self-actualization.

In an interview with i-D Magazine, Lamar spoke highly of the track, believing some of his best verses he's ever written come from "Fear", saying "[The song's] completely honest." Lamar continued "The first verse is everything that I feared from the time that I was seven years old. The second verse I was 17. In the third, it's everything I feared when I was 27. These verses are completely honest."

== Samples ==
The song contains a sample of "Poverty's Paradise", written by Dale Warren and performed by 24-Carat Black from the album Ghetto: Misfortune's Wealth. According to Genius, the second verse contains an interpolation of rapper Beanie Sigel's song "Die", from his first studio album The Truth.

== Credits and personnel ==
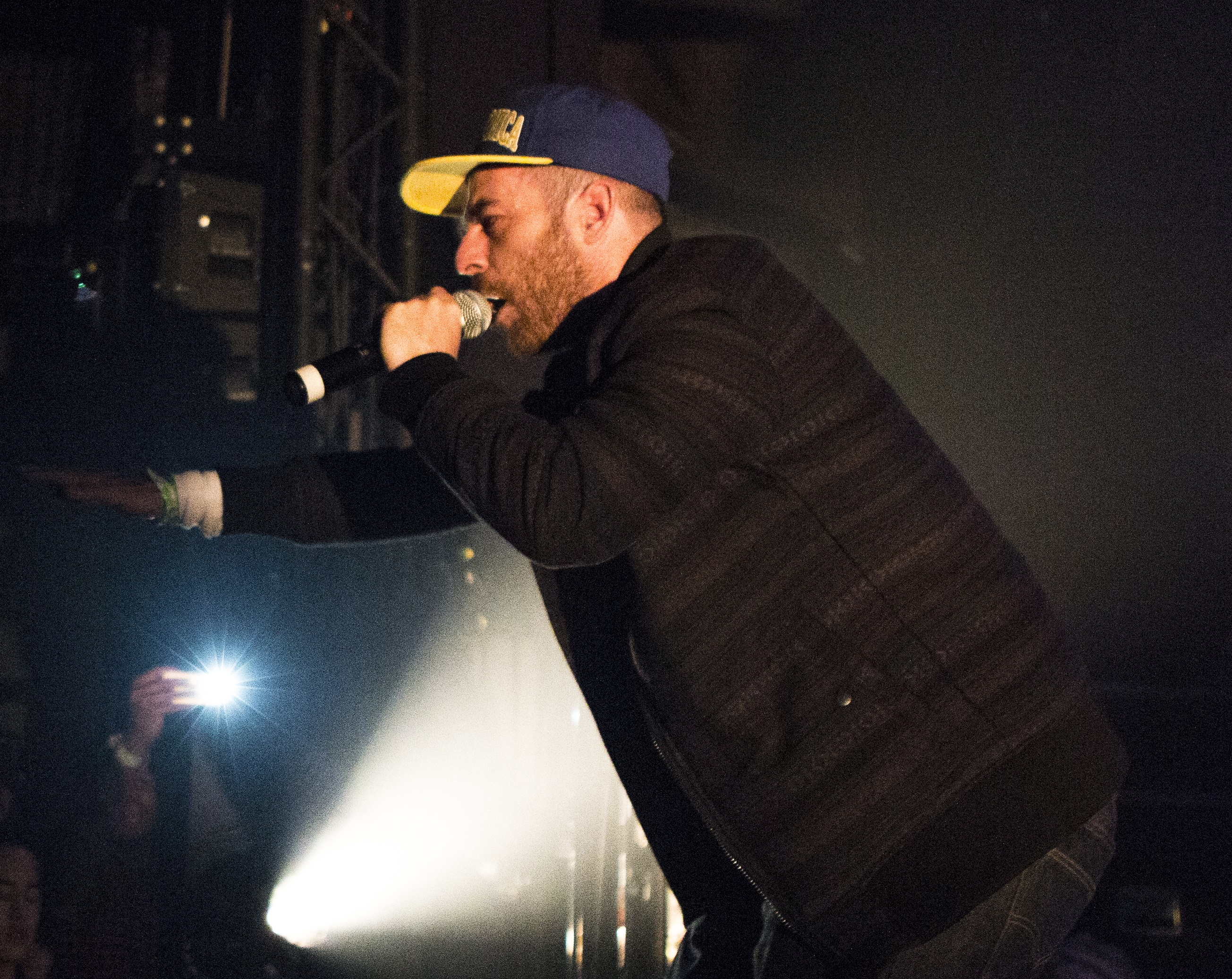
Daniel Maman a.k.a. The Alchemist produced the song.

Credits adapted from the official Damn digital booklet.

- Kendrick Duckworth – songwriter
- Daniel Alan Maman – producer, songwriter
- Charles Edward Sydney Isom Jr. – additional vocals
- Bēkon – additional production, additional vocals
- Carl Duckworth – additional vocals
- Derek Ali – mixing
- Tyler Page – mixing, mix assistant
- Cyrus Taghipour – mix assistant

== Charts ==
| Chart (2017) | Peak position |
|---|---|
| Canada Hot 100 (Billboard) | 43 |
| France (SNEP) | 170 |
| Ireland (IRMA) | 43 |
| Netherlands (Single Top 100) | 85 |
| New Zealand Heatseekers (Recorded Music NZ) | 2 |
| Portugal (AFP) | 41 |
| Slovakia Singles Digital (ČNS IFPI) | 63 |
| Sweden Heatseeker (Sverigetopplistan) | 4 |
| UK Singles (Official Charts) | 68 |
| US Billboard Hot 100 | 50 |
| US Hot R&B/Hip-Hop Songs (Billboard) | 29 |

== Certifications ==
| Region | Certification | Certified units/sales |
|---|---|---|
| Australia (ARIA) | Gold | 35,000^{‡} |
| Canada (Music Canada) | Gold | 40,000^{‡} |
| New Zealand (RMNZ) | Gold | 15,000^{‡} |
| United States (RIAA) | Gold | 500,000^{‡} |
^{‡} Sales+streaming figures based on certification alone.
