= Blonde (Frank Ocean album) =

Studio album by Frank Ocean
- Released: August 20, 2016
- Recorded: 2013–2016
- Studios: Abbey Road (London); Electric Lady (New York City); Henson Recording (Los Angeles)
- Genres: R&B; avant-soul; psychedelic pop
- Length: 60:08
- Label: Boys Don't Cry
- Producers: Buddy Ross; Frank Ocean; Francis Starlite; James Blake; Jon Brion; Joe Thornalley; Malay Ho; Michael Uzowuru; Om'Mas Keith; Pharrell Williams; Rostam Batmanglij

Frank Ocean chronology
| Endless (2016) | Blonde (2016) |

Singles from Blonde
- 1. "Nikes" Released: August 20, 2016

Blonde is the second studio album by the American singer Frank Ocean. (Note: Blonde is noted as Ocean's second studio album, following the 2011 mixtape Nostalgia, Ultra, his debut album Channel Orange (2012), and the 2016 visual album Endless. The album is titled Blonde on streaming services, but is alternatively titled Blond.) It was released on August 20, 2016, as a timed exclusive on both the iTunes Store and Apple Music, which followed immediately after the August 19 release of Ocean's video album Endless. The album features guest vocals from André 3000, Beyoncé, and Kim Burrell, among others. Production was handled by Ocean himself, alongside a variety of high-profile record producers, including Malay and Om'Mas Keith, both of whom collaborated with Ocean on Channel Orange. The album also features production from James Blake, Jon Brion, Buddy Ross, Pharrell Williams, Rostam Batmanglij, among others.

Initially known as Boys Don't Cry and teased for a July 2015 release, Blonde suffered several delays and was the subject of widespread media anticipation leading up to its release. Recording for the album took place throughout 2013 and 2016 at New York's Electric Lady Studios and, after a period of writer's block, in London at Abbey Road Studios and in Los Angeles' Henson Recording Studios. Blonde features an abstract and experimental sound in comparison to Ocean's previous releases, encompassing styles such as R&B, pop, soul, avant-garde, indie rock, electronica, psychedelia, and hip-hop. The rhythms on the album are considered languid and minimal. The album's themes surround Ocean dealing with his masculinity and emotions, inspired by sexual experiences, heartbreak, loss, duality, and trauma.

Blonde received widespread acclaim, with critics praising Ocean's introspective lyrics and the album's unconventional and progressive sounds. Critics also complimented the album for challenging the conventions of R&B and pop music. Among other publications, Time named it the best album of 2016. Supported by its lead single "Nikes", the album debuted at number one in several countries, including the United States, where it earned first week sales of 275,000 with album-equivalent units, with 232,000 being pure sales. It was eventually certified platinum by the Recording Industry Association of America (RIAA) and named by Pitchfork as the best album of the 2010s. Rolling Stone ranked it at number 79 on their updated list of the 500 Greatest Albums of All Time.

== Background ==
On February 21, 2013, Ocean confirmed that he had started work on his next studio album, which he confirmed would be another concept album. He revealed that he was working with Tyler, the Creator, Pharrell Williams, and Danger Mouse on the record. He stated that he was interested in collaborating with Tame Impala and King Krule, and wanted to record the album in Bora Bora. Ocean ultimately began recording at New York's Electric Lady Studios and, after a period of writer's block, recorded in London at Abbey Road Studios in addition to various other studios.

In April 2014, Ocean stated that his second album was nearly finished. In June 2014, Billboard reported that the singer was working with a string of artists such as Happy Perez (whom he worked with on Nostalgia, Ultra), Charlie Gambetta and Kevin Ristro, while producers Hit-Boy, Rodney Jerkins, and Danger Mouse were also said to be on board. On November 29, 2014, Ocean released a snippet of a new song supposedly from his upcoming follow-up to Channel Orange called "Memrise" on his official Tumblr page. The Guardian described the song as: "a song which affirms that despite reportedly changing labels and management, he has maintained both his experimentation and sense of melancholy in the intervening years".

Boys do cry, but I don't think I shed a tear for a good chunk of my teenage years. It's surprisingly my favorite part of life so far. Surprising, to me, because the current phase is what I was asking the cosmos for when I was a kid.

— Frank Ocean, 2016

In a personal letter which prefaced the Boys Don't Cry magazine, Ocean stated that he had been inspired by a photograph taken by the photography duo the Collaborationist of a young blonde girl in the back seat of a car. According to Jessica Haye of the Collaborationist, "It was more ambiguous in terms of gender and (Ocean) kind of placed his own experience onto the picture, so he brought a whole other story very personal to him in it". This photograph would be used in promotional material for the album. In his only interview of the album's release cycle, Ocean told Jon Caramanica that a conversation with a childhood friend from New Orleans helped him overcome his writer's block and convinced him to touch on his experiences growing up: "How we experience memory sometimes, it's not linear. We're not telling the stories to ourselves, we know the story, we're just seeing it in flashes overlaid".

== Music and composition ==
Blonde features an abstract, atmospheric sound in comparison to Ocean's previous work, and utilizes a variety of unconventional musical elements. Besides the Beatles, the album draws influences from Stevie Wonder. Additionally, the Beach Boys' de facto leader Brian Wilson is recognized as a strong influence on the album's lush arrangements and layered vocal harmonies. Featuring a use of guitar and keyboard loops, writers noted that the rhythms on the album are languid and minimal. The album's themes surround Ocean dealing with his masculinity and emotions, inspired by personal heartbreak, loss and trauma.

The album has been categorized as avant-soul. The Quietus wrote that its form "isn't that of a typical pop or R&B album – it tends to meander into his surreal dreamscapes, cut with jarring samples of conversation, odd effects, drifting guitars and beatless melodies that go on longer than expected." The Daily Telegraph described its sound as "a mellifluous concoction of shimmering melodic haze and ambient mood, almost entirely absent of anything resembling a singalong chorus or club groove." The Observer's Kate Mossman characterized the album as "cerebral, non-macho, boundary-free R&B." The Guardian tentatively likened Blonde to a collection of loose sketches and compared its "lush and atmospheric" tracks to experimental and texture-driven albums such as Radiohead's Kid A (2000) and Big Star's Third (1974), writing that "the tone is muted and introspective, full of spectral guitar and lacking not just hefty beats but any kind of percussion at all."

Discussing its musical eclecticism, Rolling Stone wrote that "this is an R&B album in only the most elastic and expansive sense of the term" and noted that "minimalist rock guitar and simple electric keyboard work drive numerous songs; twitchy rhythms and bizarre vocal effects creep in from the edges. Songs change shape subtly as they go, rarely ending in the same place they began." Ann Powers described the album as "equal parts psychedelic indie rock, post-IDM electronica, post-U2 / Coldplay-esque Eno-pop, post-Drake hip-hop, and post-Maxwell drifty soul / R&B," and wrote that "experimental, druggy sonics abound." Nina Corcoran from Consequence described Blonde as featuring an avant-garde minimalist style similar to the work of Brian Eno, and noted that Ocean often utilizes "acoustic and electric guitars over traditional synth and bass-heavy R&B." The Independent wrote that "one track bleeds languidly into another, as if we're listening to a long, stoned stream-of-consciousness," and described the album's sound as a "glitchy, miasmic brand of R&B."

The Daily Telegraph noted Ocean's use of varispeed and Auto-Tune effects on his voice, while Greg Kot stated that he utilizes these audio processing devices to employ "two distinct voices, like characters in a play, a recurring theme throughout the album". Spin magazine's Dan Weiss compared his vocal treatments to those of Prince's aborted Camille album. The Daily Telegraph also suggested that Ocean's voice and melodies obscured the experimental nature of his compositions. The album has elements of spoken word. The track "Seigfried" interpolates a spoken word part by Elliott Smith and "White Ferrari" borrows musical elements from the Beatles' song "Here, There and Everywhere", while "Close to You" incorporates a Stevie Wonder sample. Guest vocalist André 3000 contributes a rapid rap verse on "Solo (Reprise)" which has been described as the album's only overt guest feature. In a 2022 interview, André revealed the song was recorded in Austin, Texas years before the album's release and originally featured a hip-hop instrumental, before being replaced with a piano arrangement from James Blake. "Pretty Sweet" features gospel choir elements and dissonant noise. The album ends with an interview between Ocean and his brother Ryan, recorded when Ryan was 11 years old.

== Release and promotion ==
"Late", Boys Don't Cry library card posted by Frank Ocean on July 2, 2016.

On April 6, 2015, Ocean announced that his follow-up to Channel Orange would be released in July, as well as a publication, although no further details were released. The album was ultimately not released in July, with no explanation given for its delay. The publication was rumored to be called Boys Don't Cry, and was slated to feature the aforementioned "Memrise", although the track did not make the final track listing and was never officially released. On July 2, 2016, Ocean hinted at a possible third album with an image on his website suggesting a July or November release date. On August 1, 2016, a live video marked the first update on the website since the library card post from July.

Many news outlets reported that August 5, 2016, could be the release date for Boys Don't Cry. The website video was revealed to be promotion for Endless, a 45-minute-long visual album that began streaming on Apple Music on August 19, 2016. The day after the release of Endless, Ocean advertised four pop-up shops in Los Angeles, New York City, Chicago and London. These shops offered hundreds of free magazines titled Boys Don't Cry, which contained a CD version of Blonde. The magazines themselves contained various photography by Wolfgang Tillmans, Viviane Sassen and others; a screenplay called "Godspeed" (which shares the same name of a track on Blonde), interviews with various people including the American rapper Lil B, and a poem by Kanye West about the fast-food chain McDonald's. Later in the day, the album was released exclusively on the iTunes Store and Apple Music. However, the CD track list differed from the digital version of the album, with an extended version of "Nikes" featuring Japanese rapper KOHH. "Nikes" was officially released as the album's lead single on August 20, 2016.

Rather than going on a typical promotional tour playing radio festivals and appearing on television shows, Ocean spent a month after the release of Blonde, traveling to countries such as China, Japan and France. He also chose not to submit Blonde for consideration at the Grammy Awards, stating "that institution certainly has nostalgic importance... It just doesn't seem to be representing very well for people who come from where I come from, and hold down what I hold down."

== Critical reception ==
Contemporary ratings
Aggregate scores
| Source | Rating |
|---|---|
| AnyDecentMusic? | 8.4/10 |
| Metacritic | 87/100 |
Review scores
| Source | Rating |
| AllMusic | 3.5/5 stars |
| The Daily Telegraph | 4/5 stars |
| Entertainment Weekly | A |
| The Guardian | 5/5 stars |
| The Observer | 4/5 stars |
| Pitchfork | 9.0/10 |
| Rolling Stone | 4/5 stars |
| Spin | 8/10 |
| The Times | 4/5 stars |
| Vice (Expert Witness) | B+ |

Retrospective ratings
Review scores
| Source | Rating |
|---|---|
| AllMusic | 5/5 stars |

Blonde was met with widespread critical acclaim. At Metacritic, which assigns a normalized rating out of 100 to reviews from professional critics, the album received an average score of 87, based on 38 reviews. Aggregator AnyDecentMusic? gave it 8.4 out of 10, based on their assessment of the critical consensus.

Mojo reviewer Andy Cowan called it "a beguiling, meandering sprawl that rewards total immersion", while Tara Joshi deemed Blonde a "fully conceptualised, curated personal vision" and "a sublime and largely impressive album" in her review for The Quietus. In Rolling Stone, Jonah Weiner described the album as "by turns oblique, smolderingly direct, forlorn, funny, dissonant and gorgeous: marvel of digital-age psychedelic pop." Writing for The Guardian, Tim Jonze hailed Blonde as "one of the most intriguing and contrary records ever made". He said that "what originally appear to be Blonde's flaws – its loose ends and ambiguities – end up as its strengths," concluding that "what gradually emerges is a record of enigmatic beauty, intoxicating depth and intense emotion." According to Pitchfork journalist Ryan Dombal, while Channel Orange had boasted a more eclectic range of styles, Blonde showed Ocean expressing his romantic, philosophical, and melancholic ideas and emotions over an especially spare musical backdrop, giving the record an intimacy that "attracts the ear, bubbles the brain, raises the flesh". In Vice, Robert Christgau admired Ocean's reliance on his "expressive and capable but unathletic voice", the candid stories explored on "Good Guy" and "Facebook Story", and more aggressive songs such as "Nights". "As on Channel Orange, however, his angst is a luxury of leisure", Christgau wrote, finding the details of Ocean's interpersonal lyrics occasionally relatable but more often "specific to his social status".

Neil McCormick was somewhat less enthusiastic. In The Daily Telegraph, he wrote that Blonde "should be celebrated as part of a generational shift away from the obvious in pop", while finding the record to be "meandering, contemplative and introverted", suggesting that it would be a laborious experience for some listeners. AllMusic's Andy Kellman deemed it "undiluted and progressive" but qualified his praise by stating that "over the course of an hour, all the sparsely ornamented ruminations can be a bit of a chore to absorb, no matter how much one hangs on each line". Andy Gill was more critical in The Independent, deeming much of the music lethargic, aimless, and devoid of strong melodies. HipHopDX reviewer William Ketchum III in a mixed review said that the singer "sometimes delivers only what's necessary to make his point, while other efforts come across as meandering and incomplete".

=== Rankings ===
At the end of 2016, Blonde appeared on a number of critics' lists ranking the year's best albums. According to Metacritic, it was the third most prominently ranked album of 2016.

Select rankings of Blonde
| Publication | List | Year | Rank | Ref. |
|---|---|---|---|---|
| The A.V. Club | 50 Favorite Albums of the 2010s | 2019 | 20 | |
| Billboard | The 100 Greatest Albums of the 2010s | 2019 | 28 | |
| Complex | The 50 Best Albums of 2016 | 2016 | 6 | |
| The Guardian | The 40 Best Albums of 2016 | 2016 | 2 | |
| The Guardian | The 100 Best Albums of the 21st Century (2000–2019) | 2019 | 10 | |
| The Independent | The 20 Best Albums of 2016 | 2016 | 5 | |
| The Independent | The 50 Best Albums of the Decade | 2019 | 15 | |
| NME | The 50 Best Albums of 2016 | 2016 | 10 | |
| Pitchfork | The 50 Best Albums of 2016 | 2016 | 2 | |
| Pitchfork | The 200 Best Albums of the 2010s | 2019 | 1 | |
| Rolling Stone | The 50 Best Albums of 2016 | 2016 | 5 | |
| Rolling Stone | 100 Best Albums of the 2010s | 2019 | 12 | |
| Rolling Stone | 500 Greatest Albums of All Time | 2020 | 79 | |
| Rolling Stone | The 250 Greatest Albums of the 21st Century So Far | 2025 | 3 | |
| Spin | The 50 Best Albums of 2016 | 2016 | 2 | |
| The Wire | The Top 50 Releases of the Year | 2017 | 43 | |

== Commercial performance ==
In the first week of release, Blonde debuted at number one on the US Billboard 200 and recorded 276,000 album-equivalent units, including 232,000 copies of the album sold. The songs on the album were collectively streamed more than 65.4 million times, second behind only the streams for Views by Drake during that week. Forbes estimated that Blonde earned Ocean nearly one million in profits after one week of availability, attributing this to him releasing the album independently and as a limited exclusive release on iTunes and Apple Music. Blonde has generated 404 million on-demand audio streams for its songs in the US through February 9, 2017, according to Nielsen Music. The album has earned 620,000 album-equivalent units, 348,000 of which were copies sold.

On July 9, 2018, Blonde was certified platinum by the Recording Industry Association of America (RIAA).

== Track listing ==
Blonde track listing
| No. | Title | Writer(s) | Producer(s) | Length |
|---|---|---|---|---|
| 1. | "Nikes" | Christopher Breaux; James Blake | Frank Ocean; Malay Ho; Om'Mas Keith | 5:14 |
| 2. | "Ivy" | Breaux; Ho | Ocean; Keith; Rostam Batmanglij | 4:09 |
| 3. | "Pink + White" | Breaux; Pharrell Williams | Ocean; Williams | 3:04 |
| 4. | "Be Yourself" | Buddy Ross^{[a]} | | 1:26 |
| 5. | "Solo" | Breaux; Ho | Ocean; James Blake | 4:17 |
| 6. | "Skyline To" | Breaux; Tyler Okonma; Christophe Chassol | Ocean; Ho; Keith | 3:04 |
| 7. | "Self Control" | Breaux | Ocean; Ho; Jon Brion | 4:09 |
| 8. | "Good Guy" | Breaux | Ocean | 1:06 |
| 9. | "Nights" | Breaux; Joe Thornalley; Michael Uzowuru | Ocean; Thornalley; Uzowuru; Ross | 5:07 |
| 10. | "Solo (Reprise)" | André Benjamin; Blake; Breaux | Ocean; Blake; Brion | 1:18 |
| 11. | "Pretty Sweet" | Breaux | Ocean; Ho; Keith | 2:38 |
| 12. | "Facebook Story" | Sebastian Akchoté; Ross^{[a]} | Ocean | 1:08 |
| 13. | "Close to You" | Breaux; Ross; Burt Bacharach^{[b]}; Harold David^{[b]} | Ocean; Ross; Francis Starlite | 1:25 |
| 14. | "White Ferrari" | Breaux; Kanye West; Ho; John Lennon^{[c]}; Paul McCartney^{[c]} | Ocean; Brion; Keith | 4:08 |
| 15. | "Seigfried" | Breaux; Ho; Batmanglij^{[d]}; Elliott Smith^{[d]} | Ocean; Ho | 5:34 |
| 16. | "Godspeed" | Breaux; Ho | Ocean; Keith; Ho; Blake | 2:57 |
| 17. | "Futura Free" (includes unlisted track "Interviews", written by Ross^{[a]}) | Breaux; Dave Allen^{[e]}; Hugo Burnham^{[e]}; Andy Gill^{[e]}; Jon King^{[e]} | Ocean; Keith; Ho | 9:24 |
| Total length: | | | | 60:08 |

Notes

- "Nikes" features uncredited vocals by KOHH on the original magazine edition
- "Pink + White" features backing vocals from Beyoncé
- "Be Yourself" features uncredited vocals by Rosie Watson
- "Self Control" features uncredited vocals by Austin Feinstein
- "Solo (Reprise)" features uncredited vocals by André 3000
- "Pretty Sweet" features uncredited vocals by Capital Children's Choir, conducted by Rachel Santesso
- "Facebook Story" features uncredited vocals by Sebastian
- "Interviews" features interviews with Ryan Moore, Ibrahim Hariri, Na-Kel Smith, Sage Elsesser, Evan Clark, Nabil Hariri, and Frank Ocean, conducted by Mikey Alfred

Sample credits

- ^{^[a]} "Be Yourself", "Facebook Story", "Good Guy", and "Interviews" contain a sample of "Running Around", written and performed by Buddy Ross.
- ^{^[b]} "Close to You" contains a sample of "They Long to Be Close to You", written by Bacharach and David, as performed by Stevie Wonder live on The David Frost Show.
- ^{^[c]} "White Ferrari" contains an interpolation of "Here, There and Everywhere", written by Lennon and McCartney, as performed by the Beatles.
- ^{^[d]} "Seigfried" contains a quote from "A Fond Farewell", written and performed by Elliott Smith; and a sample from "Untitled", written and performed by Rostam Batmanglij.
- ^{^[e]} "Futura Free" contains a sample of "Anthrax", written by Allen, Burnham, Gill, and King, as performed by Gang of Four.

== Personnel ==
Credits are adapted from the album's liner notes.

Production and arrangement

- Frank Ocean – production (tracks 1–3, 5–17), arrangement (tracks 1, 5, 6, 9, 13, 14, 16), executive production
- Malay Ho – production (tracks 1, 6, 7, 11, 15–17), arrangement (tracks 1, 6, 11)
- Om'Mas Keith – production (tracks 1, 2, 6, 11, 14, 16, 17), arrangement (tracks 1, 11, 17)
- James Blake – production (tracks 5, 10, 16), arrangement (tracks 5, 10, 16)
- Jon Brion – production (tracks 7, 10, 14), arrangement (tracks 7, 9–11, 14), string arrangement (tracks 3, 7, 11)
- Buddy Ross – production (tracks 9, 13), arrangement (tracks 9, 13, 14)
- Rostam Batmanglij – production (track 2), arrangement (track 2)
- Pharrell Williams – production (track 3)
- Joe Thornalley – production (track 9), arrangement (track 9)
- Michael Uzowuru – production (track 9)
- Francis Starlite – production (track 13), arrangement (track 13)
- Alex Giannascoli – arrangement (tracks 7, 14)
- Christophe Chassol – arrangement (track 6)
- Austin Feinstein – arrangement (track 7)
- Sebastian Akchoté – arrangement (track 16), string arrangement (track 16)
- Benjamin Wright – string arrangement (track 3)
- Jonny Greenwood – string arrangement (track 15)

Musicians

- Frank Ocean – lead vocals, keyboards (tracks 8, 17), programming (track 7), sample programming (track 14), drum programming (track 17), additional programming (tracks 1, 5, 16), guitars (track 9), choir (track 16)
- Kim Burrell – featured vocals (track 16)
- Yung Lean – featured vocals (track 16)
- Amber Coffman – additional vocals (track 1)
- Jazmine Sullivan – additional vocals (track 5)
- Beyoncé Knowles-Carter – additional vocals (track 3)
- Malay Ho – keyboards (tracks 14–17), guitars (tracks 6, 7, 11, 15), drum programming (tracks 1, 11), mellotron (track 1), bass (track 15)
- Buddy Ross – keyboards (tracks 9, 13, 14, 17), bass (track 11), additional programming (track 13)
- Jon Brion – keyboards (tracks 7, 9, 10, 14), drum programming (track 10)
- Pharrell Williams – keyboards (track 3), drum programming (track 3), bass (track 3)
- Joe Thornalley – keyboards (track 9), drum programming (tracks 9, 13)
- James Blake – keyboards (tracks 5, 6, 10, 16)
- Mars 1500 – keyboards (tracks 5, 16)
- Christophe Chassol – keyboards (track 6), Moog solo (track 6)
- Rostam Batmanglij – keyboards (track 15)
- Om'Mas Keith – drum programming (tracks 1, 11, 17), bass (track 17)
- Sebastian Akchoté – drum programming (track 14), sample programming (track 14), strings (track 16)
- Tyler Okonma – drum programming (track 6)
- Michael Uzowuru – drum programming (track 9)
- Francis Starlite – vocoder (track 13)
- Alex Giannascoli – guitars (tracks 7, 14)
- Fish – guitars (track 2)
- Austin Feinstein – guitars (track 7)
- Spaceman – guitars (track 9)
- Eric Gorfain – violin concertmaster (tracks 3, 7, 11)
- Daphne Chen – violin (tracks 3, 7, 11)
- Marisa Kuney – violin (tracks 3, 7, 11)
- Charlie Bisharat – violin (tracks 3, 7, 11)
- Katie Sloan – violin (tracks 3, 7, 11)
- Songa Lee – violin (tracks 3, 7, 11)
- Gina Kronstadt – violin (tracks 3, 7, 11)
- Lisa Dondlinger – violin (tracks 3, 7, 11)
- Terry Glenny – violin (tracks 3, 7, 11)
- Chris Woods – violin (tracks 3, 7, 11)
- Neel Hammond – violin (tracks 3, 7, 11)
- Marcy Vaj – violin (tracks 3, 7, 11)
- Crystal Alforque – violin (tracks 3, 7, 11)
- Leah Katz – viola (tracks 3, 7, 11)
- Rodney Wirtz – viola (tracks 3, 7, 11)
- Stefan Smith – viola (tracks 3, 7, 11)
- Adriana Zoppo – viola (tracks 3, 7, 11)
- John Krovoza – cello (tracks 3, 7, 11)
- Simon Huber – cello (tracks 3, 7, 11)
- Ginger Murphy – cello (tracks 3, 7, 11)
- Alisha Bauer – cello (tracks 3, 7, 11)
- Stefanie Fife – cello (tracks 3, 7, 11)
- London Contemporary Orchestra – strings (track 15)

Technical personnel

- Caleb Laven – recording
- Jeff Ellis – recording
- Jason Lader – recording
- Matt Mysko – recording
- Sam Petts-Davies – recording
- Tom Elmhirst – mixing
- Noah Goldstein – mixing
- David Wrench – mixing
- Mike Dean – mastering
- Greg Koller – strings recording (tracks 3, 7, 11)
- Eric Caudieux – strings recording (tracks 3, 7, 11)

Design

- Frank Ocean – creative direction, photography
- Thomas Mastorakos – creative direction
- Viviane Sassen – photography
- Wolfgang Tillmans – photography
- Jessica Haye – photography

== Charts ==
=== Weekly charts ===
2016 chart performance for Blonde
| Chart (2016) | Peak position |
|---|---|
| Australian Albums (ARIA) | 1 |
| Belgian Albums (Ultratop Flanders) | 1 |
| Belgian Albums (Ultratop Wallonia) | 7 |
| Canadian Albums (Billboard) | 2 |
| Danish Albums (Hitlisten) | 1 |
| Dutch Albums (Album Top 100) | 2 |
| Finnish Albums (Suomen virallinen lista) | 4 |
| Irish Albums (IRMA) | 2 |
| Italian Albums (FIMI) | 6 |
| New Zealand Albums (RMNZ) | 1 |
| Norwegian Albums (VG-lista) | 1 |
| Scottish Albums (Official Charts) | 1 |
| Swedish Albums (Sverigetopplistan) | 2 |
| UK Albums (Official Charts) | 1 |
| US Billboard 200 | 1 |
| US Top R&B/Hip-Hop Albums (Billboard) | 1 |

2024–2026 chart performance for Blonde
| Chart (2024–2026) | Peak position |
|---|---|
| Icelandic Albums (Tónlistinn) | 10 |
| Portuguese Albums (AFP) | 30 |
| Swiss Albums (Schweizer Hitparade) | 57 |

=== Year-end charts ===
2016 year-end chart performance for Blonde
| Chart (2016) | Position |
|---|---|
| Australian Albums (ARIA) | 38 |
| Australian Urban Albums (ARIA) | 6 |
| Belgian Albums (Ultratop Flanders) | 118 |
| Danish Albums (Hitlisten) | 38 |
| Icelandic Albums (Tónlistinn) | 69 |
| New Zealand Albums (RMNZ) | 29 |
| Swedish Albums (Sverigetopplistan) | 89 |
| UK Albums (OCC) | 87 |
| US Billboard 200 | 48 |
| US Top R&B/Hip-Hop Albums (Billboard) | 9 |

2017 year-end chart performance for Blonde
| Chart (2017) | Position |
|---|---|
| Danish Albums (Hitlisten) | 35 |
| New Zealand Albums (RMNZ) | 48 |
| US Billboard 200 | 102 |
| US Top R&B/Hip-Hop Albums (Billboard) | 85 |

2018 year-end chart performance for Blonde
| Chart (2018) | Position |
|---|---|
| Danish Albums (Hitlisten) | 86 |
| Icelandic Albums (Tónlistinn) | 100 |
| US Billboard 200 | 165 |

2019 year-end chart performance for Blonde
| Chart (2019) | Position |
|---|---|
| Danish Albums (Hitlisten) | 96 |
| Icelandic Albums (Tónlistinn) | 100 |
| US Billboard 200 | 168 |

2020 year-end chart performance for Blonde
| Chart (2020) | Position |
|---|---|
| Belgian Albums (Ultratop Flanders) | 153 |
| Danish Albums (Hitlisten) | 76 |
| Icelandic Albums (Tónlistinn) | 69 |
| US Billboard 200 | 130 |

2021 year-end chart performance for Blonde
| Chart (2021) | Position |
|---|---|
| Belgian Albums (Ultratop Flanders) | 133 |
| Danish Albums (Hitlisten) | 66 |
| Icelandic Albums (Tónlistinn) | 54 |
| US Billboard 200 | 121 |

2022 year-end chart performance for Blonde
| Chart (2022) | Position |
|---|---|
| Belgian Albums (Ultratop Flanders) | 136 |
| Danish Albums (Hitlisten) | 61 |
| Icelandic Albums (Tónlistinn) | 31 |
| Lithuanian Albums (AGATA) | 99 |
| US Billboard 200 | 106 |
| US Independent Albums (Billboard) | 11 |

2023 year-end chart performance for Blonde
| Chart (2023) | Position |
|---|---|
| Belgian Albums (Ultratop Flanders) | 127 |
| Danish Albums (Hitlisten) | 55 |
| Dutch Albums (Album Top 100) | 86 |
| Icelandic Albums (Tónlistinn) | 30 |
| New Zealand Albums (RMNZ) | 40 |
| US Billboard 200 | 75 |
| US Independent Albums (Billboard) | 10 |
| US Top R&B/Hip-Hop Albums (Billboard) | 37 |

2024 year-end chart performance for Blonde
| Chart (2024) | Position |
|---|---|
| Belgian Albums (Ultratop Flanders) | 62 |
| Canadian Albums (Billboard) | 45 |
| Danish Albums (Hitlisten) | 26 |
| Dutch Albums (Album Top 100) | 34 |
| Icelandic Albums (Tónlistinn) | 16 |
| Swedish Albums (Sverigetopplistan) | 75 |
| UK Albums (OCC) | 86 |
| US Billboard 200 | 50 |
| US Top R&B/Hip-Hop Albums (Billboard) | 16 |

2025 year-end chart performance for Blonde
| Chart (2025) | Position |
|---|---|
| Belgian Albums (Ultratop Flanders) | 73 |
| Dutch Albums (Album Top 100) | 62 |
| Icelandic Albums (Tónlistinn) | 40 |
| Swedish Albums (Sverigetopplistan) | 99 |
| US Billboard 200 | 47 |
| US Top R&B/Hip-Hop Albums (Billboard) | 13 |

== Certifications and sales ==
Certifications and sales for Blonde
| Region | Certification | Certified units/sales |
|---|---|---|
| Denmark (IFPI Danmark) | 5× Platinum | 100,000^{‡} |
| Iceland (FHF) | — | 5,970 |
| New Zealand (RMNZ) | 6× Platinum | 90,000^{‡} |
| United Kingdom (BPI) | 2× Platinum | 600,000^{‡} |
| United States (RIAA) | Platinum | 1,000,000^{‡} |
^{‡} Sales+streaming figures based on certification alone.

== Release history ==
Release dates and formats for Blonde
| Region | Date | Label(s) | Format(s) | Ref. |
|---|---|---|---|---|
| Chicago; London; Los Angeles; New York City | August 20, 2016 | Boys Don't Cry | Magazine with CD (limited pop-up store release) | |
| Various | August 20, 2016 | Boys Don't Cry | Digital download; streaming (iTunes Store and Apple Music exclusive) | |
| Various | September 9, 2016 | Boys Don't Cry | Digital download; streaming | |
| Various | November 25, 2016 | XL | CD; vinyl (limited online release) | |
| Various | December 17, 2022 | Blonded | Vinyl (reissue) | |

== See also ==
- Blonded Radio
