= Nights (Frank Ocean song) =

Song by Frank Ocean

from the album Blonde
- Released: August 20, 2016
- Genre: "Part 1": Alternative R&B; synth-pop; "Part 2": Trip hop; downtempo
- Length: 5:07
- Label: Boys Don't Cry
- Producers: Frank Ocean; Joe Thornalley; Michael Uzowuru; Buddy Ross

"Nights" (sometimes styled as "Night.s") is a song by the American R&B singer Frank Ocean, released as a part of his second studio album Blonde (2016). The track debuted at number 98 on the Billboard Hot 100 chart, despite not being released as a single. In August 2024, a version of the song featuring Kendrick Lamar leaked online.

== Music ==
"Nights" is a two-part track. The first part is an upbeat guitar driven section in which Ocean raps about a tedious nine to five job and the highs and lows of a previous relationship. In the ending of the first verse, Ocean moves away from the past, and discusses his anger with letting a relationship go. At 3:30 in the song, the halfway point in the album, the beat switches. The second half of the song features a slower, synth-heavy beat. Ocean raps about the struggles he dealt with in the aftermath of Hurricane Katrina, which forced him to temporarily relocate from New Orleans to Houston.

== Critical reception ==
Luke Winstanley of Clash wrote that "Nights" featured "superb, instantly memorable codas that will quickly worm their way into your subconscious." Writing The Music's review of Blonde, James d'Apice called "Nights" the album's standout track. Okayplayer's Heven Haile listed "Nights" as Ocean's 6th best song and called its beat switch "iconic." Writing for Pitchfork, Ryan Dombal called "Nights" the centerpiece of Blonde. Jonah Weiner of Rolling Stone called the track a standout, writing on its themes of romance: "He approaches the subject from oblique angles, time-shifting the different phases of relationships like he's got them loaded on DVR: skipping from the blossoming of love directly into its demise, backing up a bit, leaving out big chunks."

== Personnel ==
- Frank Ocean – production, arrangement, guitars
- Joe Thornalley – production, arrangement, drum programming, keyboards
- Michael Uzowuru – production, drum programming
- Buddy Ross – production, arrangement, keyboards
- Jon Brion – arrangement, keyboards
- Spaceman – guitars

== Subsequent usage ==
Fashion designer Diya Joukani is known for using the song as the background in her viral social media reels.

== Charts ==
Chart (2016)	Peak position
US Billboard Hot 100	98
US Hot R&B/Hip-Hop Songs (Billboard)	40
US Hot R&B Songs (Billboard)	14

2026 chart performance for "Nights"
Chart (2026)	Peak position
Global 200 (Billboard)	172
Ireland (IRMA)	98
UK Independent (Official Charts)	19
UK Hip Hop/R&B (Official Charts)	17
