= Solo (Frank Ocean song) =

Song by Frank Ocean

from the album Blonde
- Released: August 20, 2016
- Genre: Alternative R&B
- Length: 4:17
- Label: Boys Don't Cry
- Songwriters: Christopher Breaux; Malay Ho
- Producers: Frank Ocean; James Blake

"Solo" is a song by American R&B singer Frank Ocean, released as a part of his 2016 studio album Blonde. Ocean wrote the song with frequent collaborator Malay Ho, and produced it with English musician James Blake. The song features additional vocals by American singer Jazmine Sullivan, who previously appeared on Ocean's visual album Endless. The track charted at number 96 on the Billboard Hot 100 chart, despite not being released as a single.

== Background ==
"Solo" features additional vocals by American singer Jazmine Sullivan, who provided vocals for four tracks on Endless: "Hublots", "Alabama", "Wither" and "Rushes".

== Composition and lyrics ==
"Solo" is an alternative R&B song that features church organs played by James Blake. The song is in the key of E♭ major. Ocean sings in falsetto. The track addresses the pain of living a solo life through a coming of age perspective while maintaining an upbeat sound. The title is a double entendre. It can be interpreted as 'solo' as in alone or 'so low' as in feeling sad. Similar to Ocean's song Novacane, the title word "Solo" is sung receptively. Katharine Gardias of California Polytechnic State University interprets this as a way "to emphasize its meaning". The song is a homoerotic narrative of the emotional void that ensued after a friend he smoked cannabis with is no longer present.

In the lyrics "inhale, in hell, there's heaven", Ocean explores a non-traditional view of hell and heaven. Katharine Gardias of California Polytechnic State University interprets this line as Ocean getting high in order to see the good in "the worst situations". Ryan Dombal of Pitchfork refers to this line as "the smoked-out emptiness". In the second verse of the track Ocean shifts to the harsh reality of being alone. Donna-Claire Chesman of DJBooth interprets his lyric "I'm skipping showers and switching socks, sleeping good and long" "as an allusion to feeling depressed".

== Critical reception ==
In a positive critique of the song, Ryan Dombal of Pitchfork calls 'Solo' "a stunning piece of songwriting that ultimately finds some peace with being alone. It sounds like a friend". Donna-Claire Chesman of DJBooth calls the track "the song you play, really, when you want to surrender". Additionally, Rob Harvilla from the Ringer claims 'Solo' to be "the next great Frank Ocean song".

== Cover performances ==
New Zealand singer-songwriter Lorde performed a cover of "Solo" at Rogers Arena in Vancouver, BC while on her Melodrama World Tour. Lorde has previously mentioned that her album, Melodrama, was inspired by Frank Ocean's album Blonde. Grant Rindner of Complex writes that Lorde makes the song her own by slowing "down the final chorus, wringing every drop of drama from Ocean's celestial and apocalyptic lyrics".

In another cover, American singer-songwriter Halsey posted a cover of "Solo" to her Twitter account on April 24, 2019. The singer mentions in her tweet that she sang the song to herself everyday while on tour, saying it fills her "with the feeling of home". Jordan Darville of Fader writes that Halsey's vocals give the song a "heartwarming boost".

== Personnel ==
- Frank Ocean – vocals, production, arrangement, additional programming
- James Blake – production, arrangement, keyboards
- Mars 1500 – keyboards
- Jazmine Sullivan – additional vocals

== Charts ==
Chart (2016)	Peak position
US Billboard Hot 100	96
US Hot R&B/Hip-Hop Songs (Billboard)	38

== Certifications ==
Region	Certification	Certified units/sales
Denmark (IFPI Danmark)	Gold	45,000^{‡}
New Zealand (RMNZ)	Platinum	30,000^{‡}
United Kingdom (BPI)	Silver	200,000^{‡}
^{‡} Sales+streaming figures based on certification alone.
