= Pink + White =

2016 song by Frank Ocean

Song by Frank Ocean

from the album Blonde
- Released: August 20, 2016
- Studio: Abbey Road Studios (London, England)
- Genre: R&B; neo soul
- Length: 3:04
- Label: Boys Don't Cry
- Songwriters: Christopher Breaux; Pharrell Williams
- Producers: Frank Ocean; Pharrell Williams

"Pink + White" is a song by American R&B singer Frank Ocean, released as a part of his 2016 studio album Blonde. The song was written and produced by Ocean and American record producer Pharrell Williams. The song features additional vocals by fellow American singer Beyoncé. The track charted at number 84 on the Billboard Hot 100 chart, despite not being released as a single.

== Composition ==
The track speaks of a past romantic relationship, where every time the couple would "peak" things would turn out bad. The song is in 6/8 time in the key of A major, with a tempo of 160 beats per minute.

== Personnel ==
- Frank Ocean – vocals, production
- Pharrell Williams – production, keyboards, drum programming, bass
- Jon Brion – string arrangement
- Benjamin Wright – string arrangement
- Beyoncé Knowles-Carter – additional vocals
- Eric Gorfain – violin concertmaster
- Daphne Chen – violin
- Marisa Kuney – violin
- Charlie Bisharat – violin
- Katie Sloan – violin
- Songa Lee – violin
- Gina Kronstadt – violin
- Lisa Dondlinger – violin
- Terry Glenny – violin
- Chris Woods – violin
- Neel Hammond – violin
- Marcy Vaj – violin
- Crystal Alforque – violin
- Mimi Goldthorp - violin
- Leah Katz – viola
- Rodney Wirtz – viola
- Stefan Smith – viola
- Adriana Zoppo – viola
- John Krovoza – cello
- Wolf Haley - cello
- Simon Huber – cello
- Ginger Murphy – cello
- Alisha Bauer – cello
- Stefanie Fife – cello
- Greg Keller – strings recording
- Eric Caudieux – strings recording

== Charts ==
=== Weekly charts ===
2016 chart performance for "Pink + White"
Chart (2016)	Peak position
Canada Hot 100 (Billboard)	79
New Zealand Heatseekers (Recorded Music NZ)	8
UK Hip Hop/R&B (Official Charts)	18
UK Indie (Official Charts)	10
US Billboard Hot 100	84
US Hot R&B/Hip-Hop Songs (Billboard)	30

2023–2024 chart performance for "Pink + White"
Chart (2023–2024)	Peak position
Global 200 (Billboard)	96
Greece International (IFPI)	94
Lithuania (AGATA)	35
Netherlands (Single Top 100)	88
Portugal (AFP)	84
Sweden Heatseeker (Sverigetopplistan)	6
UK Indie (Official Charts)	5
UK Hip Hop/R&B (Official Charts)	11

=== Year-end charts ===
2023 year-end chart performance for "Pink + White"
Chart (2023)	Position
New Zealand (Recorded Music NZ)	40

2024 year-end chart performance for "Pink + White"
Chart (2024)	Position
Global 200 (Billboard)	88
Portugal (AFP)	125

== Certifications ==
Certifications for "Pink + White"
Region	Certification	Certified units/sales
Denmark (IFPI Danmark)	2× Platinum	180,000^{‡}
Italy (FIMI)	Gold	50,000^{‡}
New Zealand (RMNZ)	7× Platinum	210,000^{‡}
Spain (Promusicae)	Gold	30,000^{‡}
United Kingdom (BPI)	3× Platinum	1,800,000^{‡}
Streaming
Greece (IFPI Greece)	Platinum	2,000,000^{†}
^{‡} Sales+streaming figures based on certification alone.^{†} Streaming-only figures based on certification alone.
