= White Ferrari =

2016 song by Frank Ocean

Song by Frank Ocean

from the album Blonde
- Released: August 20, 2016
- Length: 4:08
- Label: Boys Don't Cry
- Producers: Frank Ocean; Jon Brion; Om'mas Keith

"White Ferrari" is a song by American R&B singer Frank Ocean. It is the fourteenth track on his second studio album, Blonde, released in 2016.

== Production ==
=== Anticipation ===
Prior to Blonde's release, A-Trak stated online that a song called "White Ferrari" would be released, though he didn't mention who would be releasing it. Vampire Weekend member Rostam Batmanglij concurred with A-Trak's tweet.

Fans speculated that the song would be Ocean's, as a promotional picture with Ocean showed the word "Ferrari" cut off on a chalkboard. Fans also drew connections between Tremaine Emory's follow-up to A-Trak's tweet stating that the "White Ferrari" song would land on an "album of the year", as well as Emory's appearance at an event which Ocean also attended.

=== Song ===
Taking after Ocean's known fixation on cars, the song follows a journey in which Ocean is driving with his lover, whom the song ambiguously refers to in the second-person perspective. The lyrics of the first verse make reference to a street called "Central." Previously, Ocean has stated that his fixation on cars "Maybe... links to a deep subconscious straight boy fantasy... Consciously though, I don't want straight." In the introduction to his magazine, Boys Don't Cry, Ocean also wrote, "How much of my life has happened inside of a car?"

=== Versions ===
In The New York Times, Ocean stated that there were "50 versions" of the song. There was one version that Ocean's little brother liked right away, stating, "You gotta put that one out, that's the one." At the time, however, Ocean was undecided "because it didn't give me peace yet."

During the 2023 installment of Coachella, Ocean performed a different version of "White Ferrari" alongside new versions of other songs.

== Critical reception ==
DJBooth called the song "haunting... four verses, no hooks, and all emotional gut. The song bleeds from the first words. It feels like a journey through a longstanding fool's errand, one we all embark on despite knowing better." The reviewer speculated that each verse, follows "separate scenes" or "vignettes". The reviewer concluded: "'White Ferrari' is a very timid self-love anthem, constructed and written with a wistful zeal. Frank Ocean's poetry grows wilder as the song progresses, and yet the final message is so accessible".

The Fader wrote that "The song centers on a drive Ocean takes with his beau in an ideal, but familiar car—a white Ferrari. The open road allows their minds to wander, and they muse on love, alternate dimensions, the afterlife, and his plans for the future... Judging by the questions and existential musings they continue to inspire, we'll likely be listening to Ocean's metaphysical car talk for years to come."

Of the Beatles interpolation, Refinery29 stated "Here, There and Everywhere" was "seamlessly" intertwined by Ocean and that "The simple but brilliant track spins the recognizable acoustics of the Beatles' song into a near-ballad." The reviewer also lauded the contributions of Blake and Justin Vernon of Bon Iver, in particular Vernon's "chillingly perfect" vocals closing out the song.

Los Angeles speculated that the white color of the Ferrari, paired with the "dilated eyes" lyric, was a metaphor for cocaine usage and pointed out that the song's drive must have taken place on "the highways in Texas, where he stayed with family as a teenager after Hurricane Katrina ravaged his hometown of New Orleans". Similarly, The Verge investigated the cocaine metaphor, drawing connections between Ferrari's horse logo with the 1983 song "White Horse" by Laid Back, a "cocaine club anthem."

For The Miscellany News, a reviewer stated that the song "is emblematic of what makes the album so effective. It's catchy, it's memorable, it has cheeky lyrics... Ocean manages to stay above the fray with an immeasurable amount of authenticity that only he seems to be able to tap into." A reviewer at The Slate called "White Ferrari" their favorite song from Ocean's album, stating it "touches my heart every time because I feel like a lot of people who go through heartbreak can relate to this, and it gives a positive outlook on the usually harsh time of dealing with losing someone."

== Personnel ==
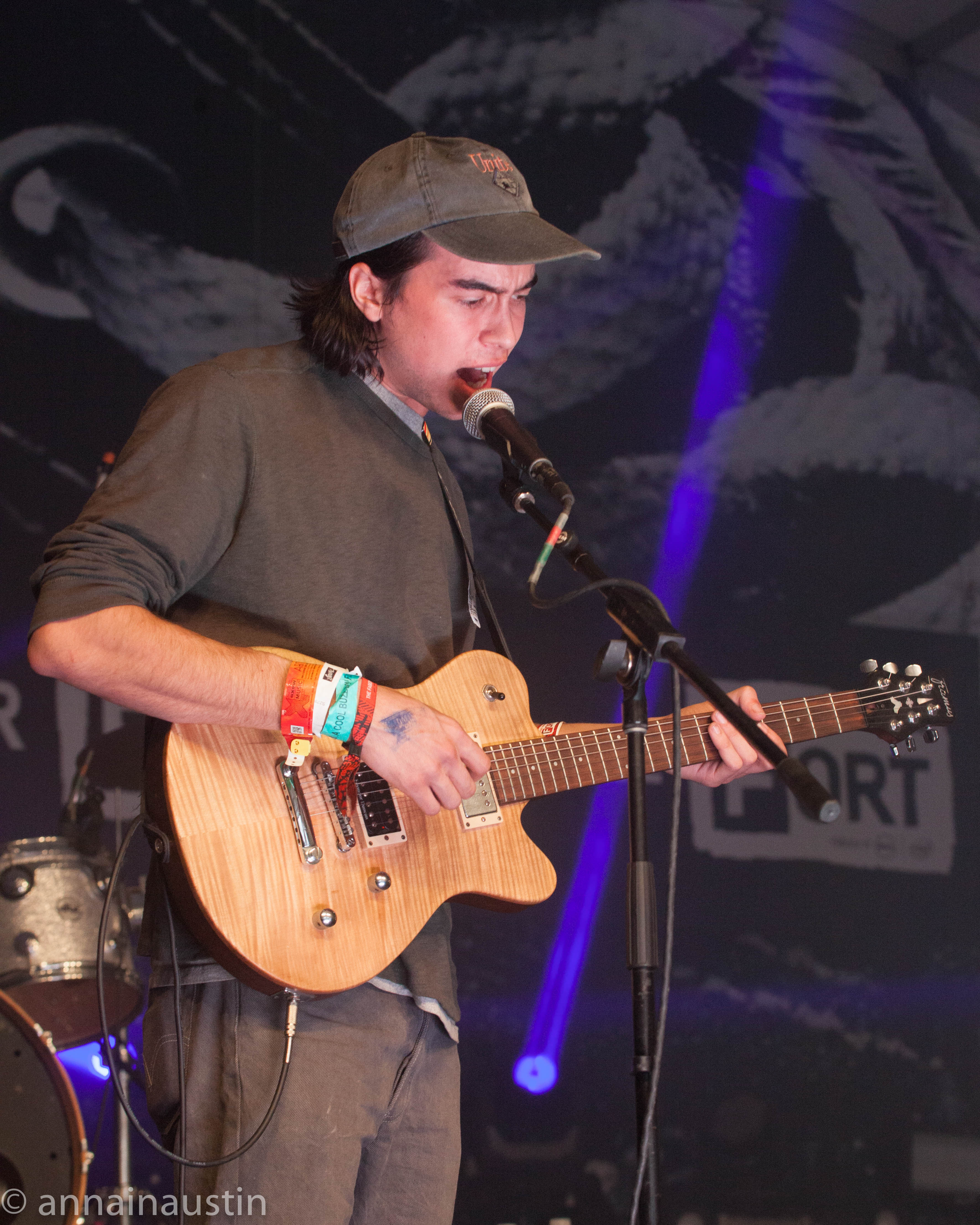
Alex G, who contributed guitar parts to "White Ferrari" and "Self Control" on Ocean's Blonde

=== List ===
- Frank Ocean—writing, production, arrangement, sample programming
- Jon Brion—production, arrangement, keyboards
- Om'Mas Keith—production
- Buddy Ross—arrangement, keyboards
- Alex G—arrangement, guitars
- Malay Ho—keyboards, writing
- Sebastian—drum programming, sample programming
- Kanye West—writing
- John Lennon—writing
- Paul McCartney—writing

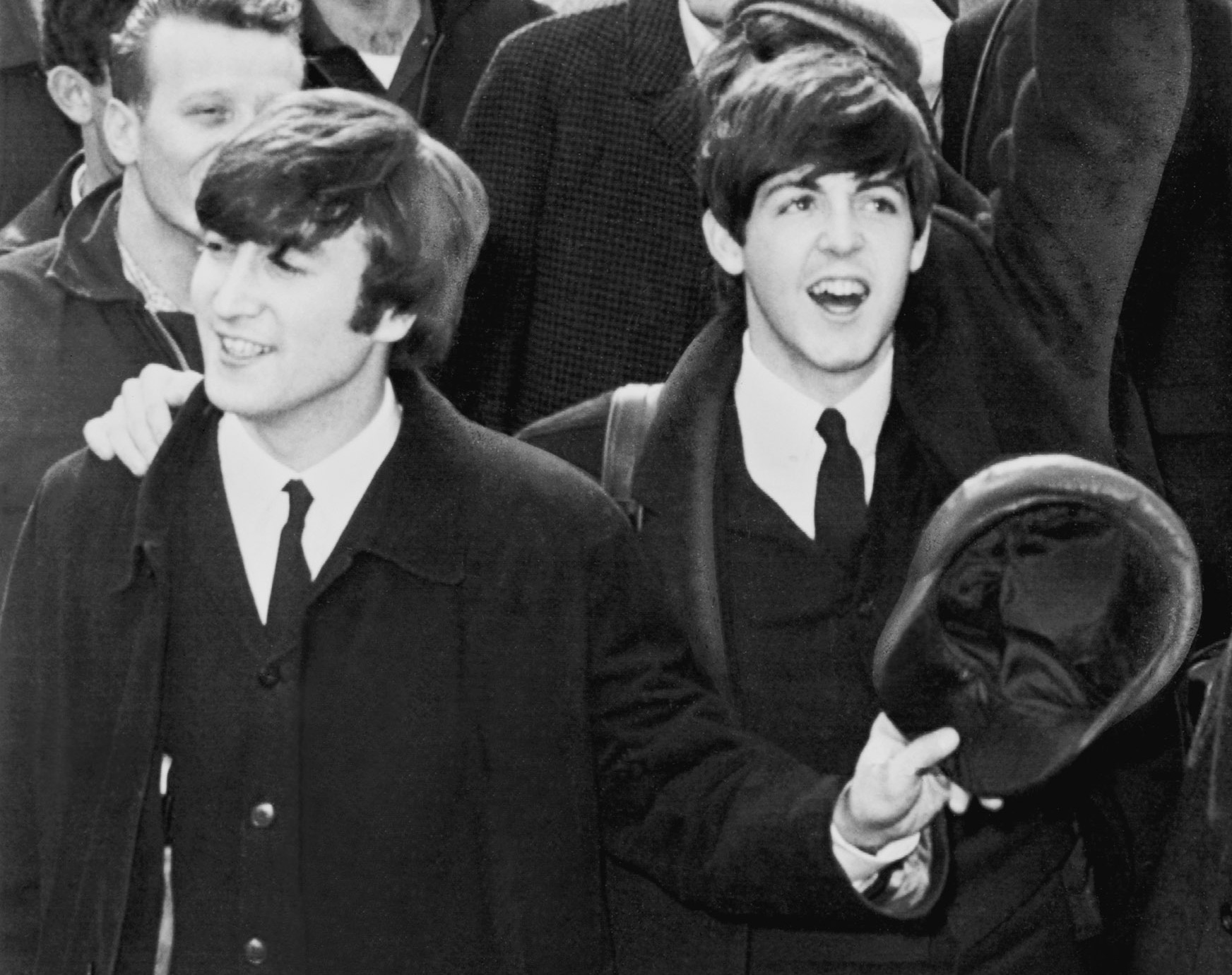
Lennon and McCartney; "Here, There, and Everywhere" was one of the many songs resulting from the famous Lennon–McCartney songwriting partnership

=== Specific contributions ===
The synth sounds in the song were recorded by Ross on a Roland Juno-106; Ross had been Ocean's live keyboardist since 2012.

Alex G recorded the guitar portion near the end of "White Ferrari" and also contributed to "Self Control". The two had met up in London while Alex G was touring.

The song credits Paul McCartney and John Lennon as writers on the song due to Ocean's interpolation of the line "Making each day of the year" from "Here, There and Everywhere". On "White Ferrari", the lyric is changed to "Spending each day of the year" but with the melody retained. During an episode of Blonded Radio, Ocean stated: "I want to thank The Beatles for almost single-handedly getting me out of writer's block."

On the liner notes of a Black Friday reprint of the Blonde vinyl, months after the album's release date, it was revealed that Kanye West was credited as a writer on the song.

James Blake and Justin Vernon lent uncredited vocals.

=== Lawsuit ===
In 2018, Ocean sued Keith due to the producer's request to be credited on "White Ferrari" and 10 other songs on Blonde and Endless. Keith counter-sued with the demand that Ocean's lawsuit be "thrown out" alongside the instatement of a "court order stating that he is the co-author of the songs and accounting for all profits Ocean made from all the songs." In 2019, both suits were dropped after Ocean and Keith negotiated a settlement.

== Charts ==
Chart (2016)	Peak position
US Hot R&B Songs (Billboard)	21

Weekly chart performance for White Ferrari"
Chart (2025)	Peak position
UK Indie (Official Charts)	18

== Certifications ==
Certifications for "White Ferrari"
Region	Certification	Certified units/sales
New Zealand (RMNZ)	4× Platinum	120,000^{‡}
^{‡} Sales+streaming figures based on certification alone.
