= Endless (Frank Ocean album) =

2016 visual album by Frank Ocean

- Artwork used on Blonded Radio

Video by Frank Ocean
- Released: August 19, 2016
- Recorded: 2013–2016
- Studios: Capitol, Hollywood; The Mercer Hotel, SoHo; MSR, New York City; Abbey Road, London; Conway, Hollywood; Shangri La, Miami; Wolfgang Tillmans' home, Berlin; TRIXX, Berlin; Studio G, Brooklyn; EastWest, Hollywood; Setai, South Beach; Hotel Bel-Air, Bel Air
- Genres: Alternative R&B; trap; ambient
- Length: 45:44
- Labels: Fresh Produce; Def Jam
- Director: Frank Ocean
- Producers: Frank Ocean; Vegyn; Troy Noka; Michael Uzowuru; Arca; Frank Dukes; Stwo; 88-Keys

Frank Ocean chronology
| Channel Orange (2012) | Endless (2016) | Blonde (2016) |

Music video
- Endless on Apple Music

Endless is a visual album by American singer Frank Ocean. It was released on August 19, 2016, as an exclusive streaming-only video on Apple Music, and preceded the August 20 release of Ocean's second studio album Blonde. Endless was later remastered and had a limited reissue in physical audio and visual formats on November 27, 2017.

The album followed a period of controversy for Ocean, who was in a highly publicized battle with Def Jam Recordings, and it was the subject of widespread media discussion upon release. Endless was recorded in various studios across California, as well as in London, Miami, and Berlin, with production handled primarily by Ocean, Vegyn, Michael Uzowuru, and Troy Noka; Ocean previously collaborated with Noka on his debut mixtape, Nostalgia, Ultra (2011).

The film follows Ocean silently woodworking on a staircase while the audio plays. Music journalists have noted the album features a minimalist aesthetic with a loose musical structure and contains similar elements featured on Blonde, including ambient music, avant-soul, R&B, and trap. Thematically, Endless explores Ocean's status as a celebrity, love and heartbreak, and age. It also contains uncredited guest appearances from Sampha and Jazmine Sullivan.

Endless received generally positive reception, with critics praising the musical content, namely its abstract structural compositions, although some were divided over the visual aspects, noting its length. Upon its re-release, it was positively reassessed, with praise directed toward its variety and since become a cult favorite among Ocean's discography.

== Background ==
On February 21, 2013, Ocean confirmed work began for his second studio album, including tentative collaborations with Tyler, the Creator, Pharrell Williams, and Danger Mouse. Ocean also revealed it would be another concept album, and he was drawing influence from the Beach Boys and the Beatles. Ocean expressed an interest in collaborating with Tame Impala and stated an intention to record in Bora Bora. He also stated a desire to collaborate with Archy Marshall, better known as King Krule; however, Marshall stated in an interview with Pitchfork that the collaboration was not successful, saying: "Frank was at my house, yeah... He came down and he wanted me to do something for his record, but I don't think he liked it."

In April 2014, Ocean stated his second album was nearly finished, and in June, Billboard reported the singer was working with Happy Perez, Charlie Gambetta and Kevin Ristro (whom he worked with on Nostalgia, Ultra), alongside Hit-Boy, Rodney Jerkins, and Danger Mouse. On November 29, 2014, Ocean released a snippet to "Memrise", a song rumored as the lead single from his new album, on Tumblr. The snippet received generally positive reception, with critics praising Ocean's musical experimentation and continued exploration of melancholic themes.

On January 16, 2015, Ocean posted a cover of "(At Your Best) You Are Love" on Tumblr as a tribute to Aaliyah. On April 6, Ocean announced the follow-up to Channel Orange would be released in July, as well as a publication, although no further details were released. The album was ultimately not released in July, with no explanation given for its delay. The publication was rumored to be called Boys Don't Cry, and was slated to feature "Memrise".

== Release and promotion ==
On July 2, 2016, he hinted at a possible second album on his website. It featured an image of a library card labeled "Boys Don't Cry" with numerous stamps, implying various due dates between July 2015 and November 2016. Ocean's brother, Ryan Breaux, further suggested a release in July 2016, with an Instagram caption of the image reading "BOYS DON'T CRY #JULY2016". On August 1, 2016, a live video hosted by Apple Music showing an empty hall was launched on the website boysdontcry.co. The website also featured a new "boysdontcry" graphic. The video marked the first update on the website since a "date due" post from July.

On August 1, 2016, a video appeared that showed Frank Ocean woodworking and sporadically playing instrumentals on loop. That same day, many news outlets reported that August 5, 2016, could be the release date for Boys Don't Cry. The video was revealed to be promotion for Endless, a 45-minute-long visual album that began streaming on Apple Music on August 19, 2016. It was later confirmed that Endless is a different project than Ocean's second studio album. The assumed title Boys Don't Cry had been replaced with a new title. Endless was his final album with Def Jam Recordings, which fulfilled his recording contract.

On April 24, 2017, Ocean aired a remix of "Slide on Me" featuring Young Thug on his radio show Blonded Radio. On November 27, on Cyber Monday, Ocean released physical, remastered editions of Endless, along with new merchandise.

== Critical reception ==
Professional ratings
Aggregate scores
| Source | Rating |
|---|---|
| AnyDecentMusic? | 7.1/10 |
| Metacritic | 74/100 |
Review scores
| Source | Rating |
| AllMusic | 2.5/5 stars |
| The A.V. Club | C+ |
| Consequence of Sound | B− |
| The Guardian | 4/5 stars |
| Mojo | 4/5 stars |
| Now | 3/5 |
| Pitchfork | 7.5/10 |
| Q | 4/5 stars |
| Spin | 6.6/10 |
| Uncut | 8/10 |

Endless received generally positive reviews from critics. At Metacritic, which assigns a normalized rating out of 100 to reviews from mainstream publications, the album received an average score of 74, based on 13 reviews.

In The Guardian, Tim Jonze said Ocean mixed the pop with the avant-garde on Endless, calling it "a rich, varied and – at times – challenging musical feast", however noting that "much of this album floats by hazily and with no clear direction". In a joint review of Endless and Blonde for Q magazine, Victoria Segal said "these records might not eclipse Channel Orange, but they have their own mercurial gleam, mapping the spaces between people, reaching for a hazy intimacy that almost feels real." Ryan Dombal of Pitchfork wrote that "as a piece of filmed entertainment, Endless is painfully dull", however praised the "much more exciting" music, comparing it to a mixtape, and stating that it is "an intriguing peek into [Ocean's] process, and it contains some of the rawest vocal takes he's ever put out". For Consequence of Sound, Nina Corcoran wrote that the video "wobbles between its highs and lows". She was ambivalent to the music's abstract nature, noting that "is filled with beauty, but it feels like a dream where you don't remember much, even if you take a pen to paper as soon as you wake". In a mixed review for AllMusic, Andy Kellman wrote that the tracks "melt into one another", concluding that "it's a smartly ordered patchwork of mostly secondary material".

Spin magazine's Brian Josephs was more critical, believing it did not work as an album. "As a whole, Endless feels formless," Josephs wrote, "like pretty, curlicue-flaunting cursive with no adherence to notebook margins." Dan Caffrey of The A.V. Club stated that the album's concept "would be slightly fascinating", if the length didn't result in "the video becom[ing] a chore to sit through". He praised the album's opening tracks, however criticised the music overall as "undercooked ambience, half-finished verses, and robotic descriptions of Apple products".

=== Rankings ===
At the end of 2016, Endless appeared on a number of critics' lists ranking the year's best albums.

Select rankings for Endless
| Publication | List | Rank | Ref. |
|---|---|---|---|
| DIY | 16 Albums That Shaped 2016 | N/A (Note: Unranked list) | |
| Tiny Mix Tapes | Favorite 50 Music Releases of 2016 | 5 | |
| The Times | 100 Best Records of the Year | 13 | |
| BrooklynVegan | Top Albums of 2016 | 15 | |
| Crack | Albums of the Year: 2016 | 38 | |

== Track listing ==
Music video track listing
| No. | Title | Writer(s) | Length |
|---|---|---|---|
| 1. | "Device Control" | Wolfgang Tillmans | 0:51 |
| 2. | "(At Your Best) You Are Love" | Ernie Isley; Marvin Isley; Chris Jasper; Rudolph Isley; O'Kelly Isley Jr.; Ronald Isley | 5:21 |
| 3. | "Alabama" | Frank Ocean | 1:25 |
| 4. | "Mine" | Ocean; Alejandra Ghersi | 0:32 |
| 5. | "U-N-I-T-Y" | Ocean; Steven Vidal; Adam Feeney | 2:54 |
| 6. | "Ambience 001: A Certain Way" | | 0:11 |
| 7. | "Comme des Garçons" | Ocean | 0:59 |
| 8. | "Xenons" | Ocean; Joe Thornalley | 0:31 |
| 9. | "Ambience 002: Honey Baby" | | 0:09 |
| 10. | "Wither" | Ocean | 2:34 |
| 11. | "Hublots" | Ocean; Charles Njapa; Garth Porter; Anthony Mitchell; Daryl Braithwaite | 1:48 |
| 12. | "In Here Somewhere" | Ocean; Troy Noka; Thornalley | 1:45 |
| 13. | "Slide on Me" | Ocean | 3:07 |
| 14. | "Sideways" | Ocean | 1:54 |
| 15. | "Florida" | Ocean | 1:15 |
| 16. | "Impietas + Deathwish (ASR)" | Ocean; Noka; Thornalley | 1:56 |
| 17. | "Rushes" | Ocean | 3:26 |
| 18. | "Rushes To" | Ocean; Noka; Thornalley; Michael Uzowuru | 2:12 |
| 19. | "Higgs" | Ocean | 3:39 |
| 20. | "Mitsubishi Sony" | Ocean; Thornalley | 2:16 |
| 21. | "Device Control" (reprise) | Tillmans | 7:01 |
| Total length: | | | 45:44 |

CD/LP Reissue track listing
| No. | Title | Writer(s) | Length |
|---|---|---|---|
| 1. | "At Your Best (You Are Love)" | Ernie Isley; Marvin Isley; Chris Jasper; Rudolph Isley; O'Kelly Isley Jr.; Ronald Isley | 5:21 |
| 2. | "Alabama" | Frank Ocean | 1:25 |
| 3. | "Mine" | Ocean; Alejandra Ghersi | 0:32 |
| 4. | "Unity" | Ocean; Steven Vidal; Adam Feeney | 2:54 |
| 5. | "A Certain Way" | | 0:11 |
| 6. | "Comme Des Garçons" | Ocean | 0:59 |
| 7. | "Xenons" | Ocean; Joe Thornalley | 0:31 |
| 8. | "Honeybaby" | | 0:09 |
| 9. | "Wither" | Ocean | 2:34 |
| 10. | "Hublots" | Ocean; Charles Njapa; Garth Porter; Anthony Mitchell; Daryl Braithwaite | 1:48 |
| 11. | "In Here Somewhere" | Ocean; Troy Noka; Thornalley | 1:45 |
| 12. | "Slide on Me" | Ocean | 3:07 |
| 13. | "Sideways" | Ocean | 1:54 |
| 14. | "Florida" | Ocean | 1:15 |
| 15. | "Impietas + Deathwish" | Ocean; Noka; Thornalley | 1:56 |
| 16. | "Rushes" | Ocean | 3:26 |
| 17. | "Rushes To" | Ocean; Noka; Thornalley; Michael Uzowuru | 2:12 |
| 18. | "Higgs" | Ocean | 3:39 |
| 19. | "Mitsubishi Sony" | Ocean; Thornalley | 2:51 |
| Total length: | | | 38:29 |

Notes

- "Device Control" and "Device Control (Reprise)" are not included in audio releases.
- "Mitsubishi Sony" is extended to 2:51 in audio releases.
- "Comme des Garçons" is incorrectly spelt "Commes des Garcons" in video releases.
- "Mitsubishi Sony" is retitled "Mitsu-Sony" in physical video releases.
- "Ambience 001: A Certain Way", "Xenons", "Ambience 002: Honey Baby", "Walk Away", "Impietas + Deathwish (ASR)", "Mitsubishi Sony", and "Device Control (Reprise)" are either not included or individually listed on certain releases.

Sample credits

- "At Your Best (You Are Love)" is a cover of the song of the same name, written by Ernie Isley, Marvin Isley, Chris Jasper, Rudolph Isley, O'Kelly Isley Jr. and Ronald Isley, first performed by the Isley Brothers and covered by Aaliyah.
- "Hublots" contains samples from "We Ride Tonight", written by Garth Porter, Anthony Mitchell and Daryl Braithwaite and performed by Sherbet.
- "Ambience 001: A Certain Way" contains a sample of dialogue from The Queen (1968), as performed by Crystal LaBeija, and "I Think I Am in Love With You", written by Norman Whiteside and performed by Wee.
- "Ambience 002: Honey Baby" contains samples from "Vapor Barato", written by Jards Macalé and Waly Salomão and performed by Gal Costa.
- "Rushes" contains an interpolation of "Just Like Water" from the album MTV Unplugged No. 2.0, written by Lauryn Hill.

== Personnel ==
=== Film ===
- Frank Ocean – direction
- Francis Soriano – direction of photography, editing
- Thomas Mastorakos – producer design
- Wendi Morris – production
- Rita Zebdi – wardrobe
- Henri Helander – wardrobe assistance
- Paper Mache Monkey – art department
- TMG – set construction
- Grant Lau – VFX
- Brandon Chavez – coloring
- Caleb Laven – sound mixing
- Keith Ferreira – 1st AC
- Taj Francois – assistant editing/DIT
- Maarten Hofmeijer – sound design
- Brent Kiser – sound design

=== Album ===
Musicians

- Frank Ocean – lead vocals (1–21), piano (3, 10–11), guitar (18), additional programming (12, 16)
- Wolfgang Tillmans – performance ("Device Control")
- Jazmine Sullivan – vocals (11), additional vocals ("Alabama"), background vocals ("Wither", "Rushes")
- Sampha – additional vocals ("Alabama")
- Rita Zebdi – additional vocals ("Comme des Garçons")
- James Blake – synthesizers ("At Your Best (You Are Love)")
- Christophe Chassol – piano ("U-N-I-T-Y")
- Kyle Combs – synthesizers ("Device Control")
- Alex G – guitars ("U-N-I-T-Y", "Wither", "Slide on Me", "Rushes", and "Higgs")
- Jonny Greenwood – string orchestration ("At Your Best (You Are Love)")
- Austin Feinstein – guitars ("Higgs")
- Om'Mas Keith – piano ("At Your Best (You Are Love)")
- Tim Knapp – synthesizers, drum programming ("Device Control")
- London Contemporary Orchestra – orchestra credits ("At Your Best (You Are Love)")
- Troy Noka – programming ("Deathwish (ASR)" and "Rushes To"), drum programming ("Comme des Garçons" and "In Here Somewhere"), synthesizers ("In Here Somewhere")
- Nolife – drum programming ("Sideways"), guitars ("Rushes To")
- Ben Reed – bass ("Comme des Garçons", "Wither", "Slide on Me", and "Rushes")
- Buddy Ross – synthesizers ("Mine", "U-N-I-T-Y", "Comme des Garçons", "Slide on Me", "Sideways", and "Rushes"), bass ("Florida")
- SebastiAn – programming, synthesizers ("At Your Best (You Are Love)", "Rushes To", and "Higgs"), additional programming, synthesizers ("Slide on Me")
- Nico Segal – trumpet ("U-N-I-T-Y")
- Rosie Slater – additional drums ("Device Control")
- Spaceman – guitars ("In Here Somewhere", "Deathwish (ASR)", "Rushes", " U-N-I-T-Y" and "Rushes To")
- Michael Uzowuru – programming ("Rushes To")
- Vegyn – programming ("Xenons", "Deathwish (ASR)", "Rushes To", and "Mitsubishi Sony"), drum programming ("Comme des Garçons", "In Here Somewhere", "Slide on Me", and "Sideways"), bass ("Slide on Me")
- 88-Keys – additional programming ("Hublots")

Production

- Frank Ocean – executive production, production
- Vegyn – production
- Troy Noka – production
- Michael Uzowuru – production
- Arca – production ("Mine")
- 88-Keys – production ("Hublots")
- Stwo – co-production ("U-N-I-T-Y")
- Frank Dukes – co-production ("U-N-I-T-Y")

Technical

- Caleb Laven – recording engineering
- Beatríz Artola – additional recording engineering
- Greg Koller – additional recording engineering
- Eric Caudieux – additional recording engineering
- Graeme Stewart – orchestra engineering ("At Your Best (You Are Love)")
- Tom Elmhirst – mix engineering
- Noah Goldstein – mix engineering
- Joe Visciano – assistant mix engineering
- Mike Dean – mastering

Design

- Frank Ocean – creative direction
- Thomas Mastorakos – creative direction, photography
- Michel Egger – graphic design
- Kevin McCaughey – graphic design

== Release history ==
List of release dates, formats, and label
| Region | Date | Format | Edition | Label |
|---|---|---|---|---|
| Various | August 19, 2016 | Digital download; streaming (iTunes and Apple Music exclusive) | Visual | Fresh Produce; Def Jam |
| Various | November 27, 2017 | CD; DVD; vinyl; VHS (limited release) | Visual; audio | Boyfriend |

== Notes ==
Notes
