= Seigfried (song) =

2016 song by Frank Ocean

Song by Frank Ocean

from the album Blonde
- Released: August 20, 2016
- Length: 5:35
- Label: Boys Don't Cry
- Songwriters: Frank Ocean; George Harrison; Om'Mas Keith; John Lennon; Paul McCartney; Elliott Smith; Ringo Starr
- Producers: Frank Ocean; Malay Ho

"Seigfried" is a song by American singer Frank Ocean from his album Blonde (2016). Thematically, the song explores Ocean's struggles with his sexuality, relationships, and his inner conflict between pursuing music and settling down in life. The song was met with critical acclaim upon release, with critics focusing on Ocean's interpolation of Elliott Smith's "A Fond Farewell" (2004).

== Production and lyrics ==
Frank Ocean, George Harrison, Om'Mas Keith, John Lennon, Paul McCartney, Elliott Smith and Ringo Starr received songwriting credits for the song. The song samples "Flying" (1967), an instrumental track by the Beatles, and interpolates elements from Elliott Smith's track "A Fond Farewell" (2004). The song also samples "Untitled" by Rostam Batmanglij. Jonny Greenwood provided string arrangements, whilst Ocean and Malay Ho produced the song. It is the fifteenth track on Blonde and was released under Ocean's label Boys Don't Cry. The song notably quotes Elliott Smith, with the line "This is not my life/It's just a fond farewell to a friend." There are references psilocybin mushrooms, commonly known as "magic mushrooms". The track begins with a soft, guitar-driven section reminiscent of 1990s alt-rock, before shifting into a more ambient and orchestral soundscape.

== Critical reception ==
Thematically, the song covers Ocean's highs and lows of life in Los Angeles, and the pressures to confirm with expectations others set. The song also explores Ocean's inner conflict between pursuing music and settling down in life. Adam Blum for the International Journal of Relational Perspectives praised the song for its psychoanalytic ideas and display of self-discovery and transformation. Craig Jenkins for Vulture described the song as an expression of Ocean's internal struggle with traditional masculinity, suggesting that the song explores Ocean's exploration of queer identity by entering relationships with emotionally distant men. The Michigan Daily interpreted the song as Ocean singing about his frustrations with bisexual erasure. The newspaper also wrote that Ocean's Elliott Smith interpolation, "this is not my life / it's just a fond farewell to a friend," showed Ocean "bidding farewell" to whom he was in the past, and being as brave as the Nordic hero whom the song is named after, Sigurd. Jason King and Ann Powers for NPR highlighted the song exploring longing and introspection through abstract, recursive lyrics, with the looping guitar reinforcing a contemplative mood. The Grammy Awards placed the song on its list of ten essential songs from Ocean's discography, praising the "psychedelic" sound. Brenton Blanchet for Complex Networks ranked the song the ninth-best out of the 18-song album. Patrick McDermott for The Fader referred to Seigfried as "the most existential song on an album fraught with existential angst". Jonah Weiner for Rolling Stone praised the production of the song.

== Live versions ==
Ocean first performed the song in 2013 in Munich, Germany.

== Credits and personnel ==
Personnel

- Frank Ocean – songwriter, producer
- Om'Mas Keith – songwriter
- John Lennon – songwriter
- George Harrison – songwriter
- Ringo Starr – songwriter
- Paul McCartney – songwriter
- Elliott Smith – songwriter
- Malay Ho – producer, guitar, bass, keyboard
- Rostam Batmanglij – keyboard
- Jonny Greenwood – string arrangement
- London Contemporary Orchestra – strings

== Charts ==
Weekly chart performance for "Seigfried"
Chart (2016)	Peak position
Hot R&B Songs	23
Bubbling Under R&B/Hip-Hop Songs	5

== Certifications ==
Certifications for "Seigfried"
Region	Certification	Certified units/sales
New Zealand (RMNZ)	Gold	15,000^{‡}
United Kingdom (BPI)	Silver	200,000^{‡}
^{‡} Sales+streaming figures based on certification alone.
