= Frank Ocean discography =

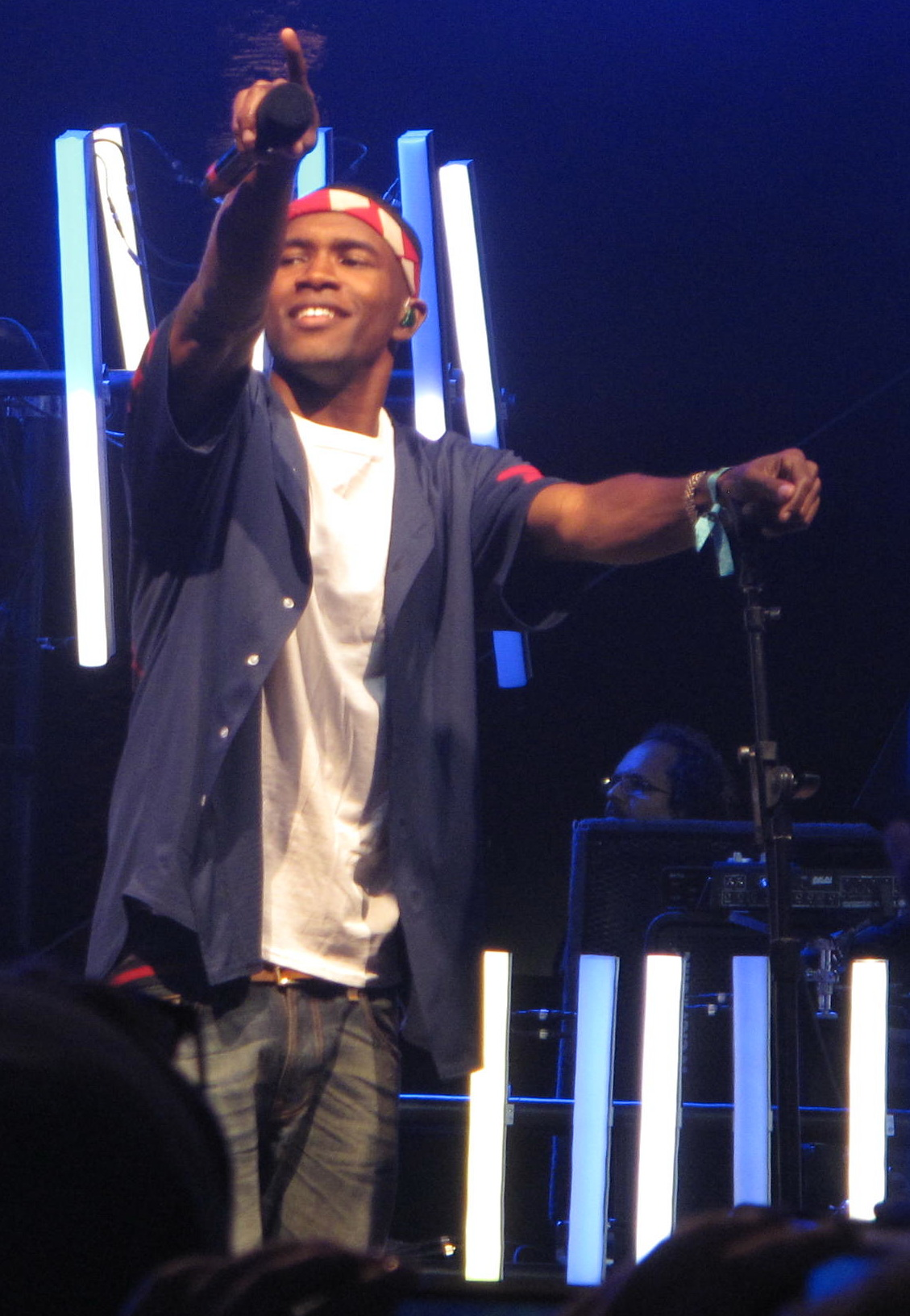
- Ocean performing at Coachella in April 2012
- Studio albums: 2
- Singles: 21
- Video albums: 1
- Music videos: 8
- Mixtapes: 1

American singer and rapper Frank Ocean has released two studio albums, one visual album, one mixtape, 21 singles (including 5 as a featured artist) and eight music videos.

Following the flooding and destruction of his recording studio during Hurricane Katrina in 2005, Ocean moved from his hometown of New Orleans to Los Angeles, where he sought to continue his musical career, eventually landing himself a songwriting contract. In 2009, Ocean signed to Def Jam Recordings as a solo artist. Ocean also formed a friendship with rapper Tyler, the Creator, leader of the Los Angeles-based hip hop collective Odd Future (OFWGKTA) and subsequently became a member of Odd Future, as well as making three guest appearances on the album Goblin, including the single "She". In February 2011, he released his first major project, his first mixtape Nostalgia, Ultra, which produced two singles: "Novacane" and "Swim Good". "Novacane" became his first single to chart on the US Billboard Hot 100, where it peaked at number 82. Ocean also made two guest appearances on the Kanye West and Jay Z collaborative album Watch the Throne, including the single "No Church in the Wild", which peaked at number 72 on the Billboard Hot 100. Ocean has also written songs for several artists, such as Brandy Norwood ("1st & Love" and "Scared of Beautiful"), John Legend ("Quickly"), Beyoncé ("I Miss You"), Bridget Kelly ("Thinking About Forever"), and Justin Bieber ("Bigger").

Ocean started writing songs for his debut studio album in February 2011 with songwriter and producer James "Malay" Ho, his friend and creative partner since their start in the music industry as songwriters. The album, Channel Orange, was released on July 10, 2012. Upon release, the album received universal acclaim from music critics, who praised the album for its bold lyrical content. The album peaked at number two on both the US Billboard 200 and the UK Albums Chart, while it hit number one on the US Billboard Top R&B/Hip-Hop Albums chart. It also became the first album in chart history to chart within the UK Albums Chart top 20 solely based on digital sales. Five singles were released from the album: "Thinkin Bout You", "Pyramids", "Sweet Life", "Lost" and "Super Rich Kids". "Thinkin Bout You" peaked at number 32 on the Billboard Hot 100, becoming Ocean's first top 40 entry on the chart. "Lost" became a top five single in New Zealand and also achieved chart success in Australia and Denmark.

After a four-year hiatus, Ocean returned by releasing Endless, a visual album, that also marked the end of contract with Def Jam. Endless was released on August 19, 2016, shortly followed by the release of the "Nikes" music video, which would be the first single off of Blonde, his second studio album, released a day later on August 20, 2016. Endless was a 45-minute-long album that intertwined the music with a video of Ocean eventually building a spiral staircase.

As of July 2026, Ocean has not had any releases on a music platform since 2020, making it his longest career hiatus thus far.

== Albums ==
=== Studio albums ===
List of studio albums, with selected chart positions, sales figures and certifications
Title	Album details	Peak chart positions										Sales	Certifications
Title	Album details	US	US R&B/ HH	AUS	CAN	DEN	IRL	NLD	NOR	NZ	UK	Sales	Certifications
Channel Orange	Released: July 10, 2012; Label: Def Jam; Formats: CD, digital download	2	1	9	3	2	14	13	1	14	2	US: 686,000; UK: 210,000	RIAA: Gold; ARIA: 2× Platinum; BPI: 2x Platinum; IFPI DEN: 3× Platinum; MC: Gold; RMNZ: 7× Platinum
Blonde	Released: August 20, 2016; Label: Boys Don't Cry; Formats: CD, LP, digital download, streaming	1	1	1	2	1	2	2	1	1	1	US: 348,000	RIAA: Platinum; BPI: 2× Platinum; IFPI DEN: 3× Platinum; RMNZ: 6× Platinum

=== Mixtapes ===
List of mixtapes
Title	Album details
Nostalgia, Ultra	Released: February 16, 2011; Formats: Digital download

=== Visual albums ===
List of visual albums
Title	Album details
Endless	Released: August 19, 2016; Label: Def Jam; Fresh Produce; Formats: CD/DVD, LP, VHS, streaming

== Singles ==
=== As lead artist ===
List of singles as lead artist, with selected chart positions and certifications, showing year released and album name
Title	Year	Peak chart positions										Certifications	Album
Title	Year	US	US R&B/HH	US R&B	AUS	BEL (FL)	CAN	DEN	NZ	UK	UK R&B	Certifications	Album
"Novacane"	2011	82	17	—	—	—	—	—	—	—	—	RIAA: Platinum; ARIA: 2× Platinum; BPI: Platinum; IFPI DEN: Gold; RMNZ: 3× Platinum	Nostalgia, Ultra
"Swim Good"	2011	—	70	—	—	89	—	—	—	—	—	ARIA: Platinum; BPI: Silver; RMNZ: Platinum	Nostalgia, Ultra
"Thinkin Bout You"	2012	32	7	4	—	—	—	33	30	94	16	RIAA: Platinum; ARIA: 5× Platinum; BPI: 2× Platinum; MC: Gold; RMNZ: 6× Platinum	Channel Orange
"Pyramids"	2012	—	— (Note: "Pyramids" did not enter the Hot R&B/Hip-Hop Songs chart, but peaked at number three on the Bubbling Under R&B/Hip-Hop Singles chart.)	21	—	74	—	—	—	—	21	RIAA: Gold; ARIA: Platinum; BPI: Platinum; RMNZ: 2× Platinum	Channel Orange
"Sweet Life"	2012	—	—	—	—	—	—	—	—	—	—	ARIA: Gold; BPI: Silver; RMNZ: Gold	Channel Orange
"Lost"	2012	— (Note: "Lost" did not enter the Billboard Hot 100 chart, but peaked at number 10 on the US Hot Hot 100 Recurrents chart.)	16	6	16	63	22	14	5	44	7	RIAA: 3× Platinum; ARIA: 8× Platinum; BPI: 3x Platinum; IFPI DEN: Gold; RMNZ: 10× Platinum	Channel Orange
"Super Rich Kids" (featuring Earl Sweatshirt)	2013	—	— (Note: "Super Rich Kids" did not enter the Hot R&B/Hip-Hop Songs chart, but peaked at number four on the Bubbling Under R&B/Hip-Hop Singles chart.)	23	—	—	—	—	—	—	20	RIAA: Gold; ARIA: 2× Platinum; BPI: Gold; IFPI DEN: Gold; RMNZ: 2× Platinum	Channel Orange
"Nikes"	2016	79	27	9	—	—	77	—	— (Note: "Nikes" did not enter the NZ Top 40 Singles Chart, but peaked at number 3 on the NZ Heatseekers Singles Chart.)	93	13	BPI: Gold; RMNZ: Platinum	Blonde
"Chanel"	2017	72	30	13	—	— (Note: "Chanel" did not enter the Flanders Ultratop 50, but charted as an "extra tip" on the Ultratip chart.)	65	—	— (Note: "Chanel" did not enter the NZ Top 40 Singles Chart, but peaked at number 2 on the NZ Heatseekers Singles Chart.)	80	16	RIAA: Platinum; BPI: Platinum; IFPI DEN: Gold; RMNZ: 3× Platinum	Non-album singles
"Biking" (featuring Jay-Z and Tyler, the Creator)	2017	—	— (Note: "Biking" did not enter the Hot R&B/Hip-Hop Songs chart, but peaked at number seven on the Bubbling Under R&B/Hip-Hop Singles chart.)	18	—	—	—	—	—	—	—	BPI: Silver; RMNZ: Platinum	Non-album singles
"Lens"	2017	—	— (Note: "Lens" did not enter the Hot R&B/Hip-Hop Songs chart, but peaked at number ten on the Bubbling Under R&B/Hip-Hop Singles chart.)	18	—	—	—	—	— (Note: "Lens" did not enter the NZ Top 40 Singles Chart, but peaked at number seven on the NZ Heatseekers Singles Chart.)	—	—		Non-album singles
"Biking (Solo)"	2017	—	—	—	—	—	—	—	—	—	—		Non-album singles
"Provider"	2017	—	—	21	—	— (Note: "Provider" did not enter the Flanders Ultratop 50, but charted as an "extra tip" on the Ultratip chart.)	—	—	— (Note: "Provider" did not enter the NZ Top 40 Singles Chart, but peaked at number two on the NZ Heatseekers Singles Chart.)	—	—	RMNZ: Gold	Non-album singles
"Moon River"	2018	— (Note: "Moon River" did not enter the Billboard Hot 100 chart, but peaked at number 11 on the Bubbling Under Hot 100 chart.)	— (Note: "Moon River" did not enter the Hot R&B/Hip-Hop Songs chart, but peaked at number three on the Bubbling Under R&B/Hip-Hop Singles chart.)	10	—	— (Note: "Moon River" did not enter the Flanders Ultratop 50, but charted as an "extra tip" on the Ultratip chart.)	—	—	— (Note: "Moon River" did not enter the NZ Top 40 Singles Chart, but peaked at number two on the NZ Heatseeker Singles Chart.)	—	—	BPI: Silver; RMNZ: Platinum	Non-album singles
"DHL"	2019	98	—	—	—	— (Note: "DHL" did not enter the Flanders Ultratop 50, but charted as an "extra tip" on the Ultratip chart.)	99	—	— (Note: "DHL" did not enter the NZ Top 40 Singles Chart, but peaked at number two on the NZ Hot Singles Chart.)	67	—		Non-album singles
"In My Room"	2019	85	42	—	—	—	70	—	— (Note: "In My Room" did not enter the NZ Top 40 Singles Chart, but peaked at number six on the NZ Hot Singles Chart.)	72	—	BPI: Gold; RMNZ: Platinum	Non-album singles
"Dear April"	2020	—	—	—	—	—	—	—	— (Note: "Dear April" did not enter the NZ Top 40 Singles Chart, but peaked at number four on the NZ Hot Singles Chart.)	—	—		Non-album singles
"Cayendo"	2020	—	—	—	—	— (Note: "Cayendo" did not enter the Flanders Ultratop 50, but charted as an "extra tip" on the Ultratip chart.)	—	—	— (Note: "Cayendo" did not enter the NZ Top 40 Singles Chart, but peaked at number 10 on the NZ Hot Singles Chart.)	—	—	RMNZ: Gold	Non-album singles
"—" denotes a recording that did not chart or was not released in that territory.

=== As featured artist ===
List of singles as featured artist, with selected chart positions and certifications, showing year released and album name
Title	Year	Peak chart positions								Certifications	Album
Title	Year	US	US R&B/HH	US Rap	AUS	BEL (FL)	CAN	NZ	UK	Certifications	Album
"She" (Tyler, the Creator featuring Frank Ocean)	2011	—	—	—	—	—	—	—	—	RIAA: 4× Platinum; BPI: Silver; RMNZ: Platinum; MC: Platinum	Goblin
"No Church in the Wild" (Jay-Z and Kanye West featuring Frank Ocean & The-Dream)	2012	72	31	20	—	40	92	—	37	RIAA: Platinum; BPI: Platinum; RMNZ: Platinum	Watch the Throne
"Slide" (Calvin Harris featuring Frank Ocean and Migos)	2017	25	12	—	11	10	16	8	10	RIAA: 5× Platinum; ARIA: 6× Platinum; BEA: Gold; BPI: 2× Platinum; RMNZ: 6× Platinum; SNEP: Diamond; MC: 7x Platinum	Funk Wav Bounces Vol. 1
"Raf" (ASAP Mob featuring ASAP Rocky, Playboi Carti, Quavo, Lil Uzi Vert and Frank Ocean)	2017	— (Note: "Raf" did not enter the Billboard Hot 100 chart, but peaked at number 18 on the Bubbling Under Hot 100 chart.)	— (Note: "RAF" did not enter the Hot R&B/Hip-Hop Songs chart, but peaked at number ten on the Bubbling Under R&B/Hip-Hop Singles chart.)	—	—	—	82	— (Note: RAF did not enter the NZ Top 40, but charted at number five on the NZ Heatseekers chart.)	—	RIAA: Platinum; RMNZ: Gold	Cozy Tapes Vol. 2
"911 / Mr. Lonely" (Tyler, the Creator featuring Frank Ocean and Steve Lacy)	2017	— (Note: "911 / Mr. Lonely" did not enter the Billboard Hot 100, but peaked at number one on the Bubbling Under Hot 100 Singles chart.)	47	—	—	—	—	—	—	RIAA: 2× Platinum; ARIA: Gold	Flower Boy
"—" denotes a recording that did not chart or was not released in that territory.

== Other charted and certified songs ==
List of songs, with selected chart positions, showing year released and album name
Title	Year	Peak chart positions									Certifications	Album
Title	Year	US	US R&B /HH	US R&B	US Rap	BEL (FL)	CAN	NZ	UK	UK R&B	Certifications	Album
"Forrest Gump"	2012	—	— (Note: "Forrest Gump" did not enter the Hot R&B/Hip-Hop Songs chart, but peaked at number four on the Bubbling Under R&B/Hip-Hop Singles chart.)	—	—	—	—	—	—	—	BPI: Silver; ARIA: Platinum; RMNZ: Platinum	Channel Orange
"Bad Religion"	2012	—	—	—	—	—	—	—	—	—	ARIA: Gold; BPI: Silver; RMNZ: Platinum	Channel Orange
"Crack Rock"	2012	—	—	—	—	—	—	—	—	—	ARIA: Gold; BPI: Silver; RMNZ: Gold	Channel Orange
"Pilot Jones"	2012	—	—	—	—	—	—	—	—	—	ARIA: Gold	Channel Orange
"Pink Matter" (featuring André 3000)	2012	—	—	—	—	—	—	—	—	—	ARIA: Gold; RMNZ: 2× Platinum; BPI: Gold	Channel Orange
"Sierra Leone"	2012	—	—	—	—	—	—	—	—	—	ARIA: Gold; RMNZ: Gold	Channel Orange
"Oceans" (Jay-Z featuring Frank Ocean)	2013	83	30	—	22	—	—	—	—	—	RIAA: Gold	Magna Carta Holy Grail
"Superpower" (Beyoncé featuring Frank Ocean)	2013	—	—	—	—	—	—	—	—	—	RIAA: Gold	Beyoncé
"Frank's Track" (Kanye West featuring Frank Ocean)	2016	—	— (Note: "Frank's Track" did not enter the Hot R&B/Hip-Hop Songs chart, but peaked at number five on the Bubbling Under R&B/Hip-Hop Singles chart.)	—	—	—	—	—	—	—	RIAA: Gold	The Life of Pablo
"Wolves" (Kanye West featuring Frank Ocean)	2016	—	—	—	—	—	—	—	88	25	BPI: Silver	The Life of Pablo
"Ivy"	2016	80	28	10	—	—	75	— (Note: "Ivy" did not enter the NZ Top 40 Singles Chart, but peaked at number 3 on the NZ Heatseekers Singles Chart.)	—	16	BPI: 2× Platinum; IFPI DEN: Gold; RMNZ: 4× Platinum	Blonde
"Pink + White"	2016	84	30	11	—	53	79	— (Note: "Pink + White" did not enter the NZ Top 40 Singles Chart, but peaked at number 8 on the NZ Heatseekers Singles Chart.)	—	18	BPI: 3× Platinum; IFPI DEN: Gold; RMNZ: 7× Platinum	Blonde
"Solo"	2016	96	38	13	—	—	97	—	—	31	BPI: Silver; RMNZ: Platinum	Blonde
"Skyline To"	2016	— (Note: "Skyline To" did not enter the Billboard Hot 100, but peaked at number 16 on the Bubbling Under Hot 100 Singles chart.)	50	18	—	—	—	—	—	—	RMNZ: Gold	Blonde
"Self Control"	2016	— (Note: "Self Control" did not enter the Billboard Hot 100, but peaked at number two on the Bubbling Under Hot 100 Singles chart.)	42	15	—	—	—	—	—	35	BPI: Gold; IFPI DEN: Gold; RMNZ: 2× Platinum	Blonde
"Good Guy"	2016	—	— (Note: "Good Guy" did not enter the Hot R&B/Hip-Hop Songs chart, but peaked at number three on the Bubbling Under R&B/Hip-Hop Singles chart.)	20	—	—	—	—	—	—		Blonde
"Nights"	2016	98	40	14	—	— (Note: "Nights" did not enter the Flanders Ultratop 50, but charted as an "extra tip" on the Ultratip chart.)	—	—	—	36	BPI: Platinum; IFPI DEN: Gold; RMNZ: 3× Platinum	Blonde
"Pretty Sweet"	2016	—	— (Note: "Pretty Sweet" did not enter the Hot R&B/Hip-Hop Songs chart, but peaked at number six on the Bubbling Under R&B/Hip-Hop Singles chart.)	24	—	—	—	—	—	—		Blonde
"Solo (Reprise)" (featuring André 3000)	2016	— (Note: "Solo (Reprise)" did not enter the Billboard Hot 100, but peaked at number 24 on the Bubbling Under Hot 100 Singles chart, credited to André 3000.)	— (Note: "Solo (Reprise)" did not enter the Hot R&B/Hip-Hop Songs chart, but peaked at number two on the Bubbling Under R&B/Hip-Hop Singles chart, credited to André 3000.)	—	—	—	—	—	—	—		Blonde
"Close to You"	2016	—	— (Note: "Close to You" did not enter the Hot R&B/Hip-Hop Songs chart, but peaked at number seven on the Bubbling Under R&B/Hip-Hop Singles chart.)	25	—	—	—	—	—	—	RMNZ: Gold	Blonde
"White Ferrari"	2016	—	— (Note: "White Ferrari" did not enter the Hot R&B/Hip-Hop Songs chart, but peaked at number four on the Bubbling Under R&B/Hip-Hop Singles chart.)	21	—	—	—	—	—	—	BPI: Platinum; RMNZ: 4× Platinum	Blonde
"Seigfried"	2016	—	— (Note: "Seigfried" did not enter the Hot R&B/Hip-Hop Songs chart, but peaked at number five on the Bubbling Under R&B/Hip-Hop Singles chart.)	23	—	—	—	—	—	—	BPI: Silver; RMNZ: Gold	Blonde
"Godspeed" (featuring Kim Burrell and Yung Lean)	2016	—	— (Note: "Godspeed" did not enter the Hot R&B/Hip-Hop Songs chart, but peaked at number eight on the Bubbling Under R&B/Hip-Hop Singles chart.)	—	—	—	—	—	—	—	BPI: Gold; RMNZ: 2× Platinum	Blonde
"Caught Their Eyes" (Jay-Z featuring Frank Ocean)	2017	63	29	—	22	—	—	—	—	—		4:44
"Where This Flower Blooms" (Tyler, the Creator featuring Frank Ocean)	2017	—	—	—	—	—	—	—	—	—	RIAA: Platinum	Flower Boy
"Purity" (ASAP Rocky featuring Frank Ocean)	2018	—	—	—	—	—	—	—	—	—	RIAA: Gold; RMNZ: Gold	Testing
"Carousel" (Travis Scott featuring Frank Ocean)	2018	24	15	—	—	—	20	30	29	—	RIAA: Platinum; ARIA: Gold; MC: Platinum	Astroworld
"—" denotes a recording that did not chart or was not released in that territory.

== Guest appearances ==
List of non-single guest appearances, with other performing artists, showing year released and album name
Title	Year	Other artist(s)	Album
"SteamRoller"	2010	Domo Genesis, Hodgy Beats	Rolling Papers
"Get My Gun"	2010	Bishop Lamont	The Shawshank Redemption: Angola 3
"Hell"	2010	MellowHype	BlackenedWhite
"Rico"	2010	MellowHype	BlackenedWhite
"Gotta' Be"	2010	Kent Money	Becoming
"Thinking Bout Forever"	2011	Bridget Kelly	Every Girl
"Window"	2011	Tyler, the Creator, Domo Genesis, Hodgy Beats, Mike G	Goblin
"Made in America"	2011	Jay-Z, Kanye West	Watch the Throne
"Lovely Day"	2011	Mann	West LA Diaries Vol. 3: Birthday Philosophy
"Analog 2"	2012	Tyler, the Creator, Syd tha Kyd	The OF Tape Vol. 2
"Snow White"	2012	MellowHype	The OF Tape Vol. 2
"White"	2012	—N/a	The OF Tape Vol. 2
"Oldie"	2012	Taco, Tyler, the Creator, Hodgy Beats, Left Brain, Mike G, Domo Genesis, Jasper Dolphin, Earl Sweatshirt	The OF Tape Vol. 2
"Bend Ya'"	2012	Mann, Kendrick Lamar	—N/a
"Astro"	2012	MellowHype	Numbers
"Slater"	2013	Tyler, the Creator	Wolf
"48"	2013	Tyler, the Creator	Wolf
"PartyIsntOver / Campfire / Bimmer"	2013	Tyler, the Creator, Lætitia Sadier	Wolf
"Oceans"	2013	Jay-Z	Magna Carta Holy Grail
"Sunday"	2013	Earl Sweatshirt	Doris
"Wildfire (Reprise)"	2013	John Mayer	Paradise Valley
"Superpower"	2013	Beyoncé	Beyoncé
"New Slaves"	2013	Kanye West	Yeezus
"Hero"	2014	Mick Jones, Paul Simonon, Diplo	Converse's Three Artists, One Song
"Caught Their Eyes"	2017	Jay-Z	4:44
"Where This Flower Blooms"	2017	Tyler, the Creator	Flower Boy
"Brotha Man"	2018	ASAP Rocky, French Montana	Testing
"Purity"	2018	ASAP Rocky, Lauryn Hill	Testing
"Carousel"	2018	Travis Scott	Astroworld

== Production discography ==
List of production credits, including non-performing songwriting for other artists (excluding guest appearances, interpolations and samples)
Track(s)	Year	Credit(s)	Artist(s)	Album
8. "I Fell"	2008	Songwriter	Noel Gourdin	After My Time
5. "Quickly"; (featuring Brandy)	2008	Producer (with Midi Mafia and Dapo Torimiro)	John Legend	Evolver
14. "1st & Love"	2008	Songwriter	Brandy	Human
17. "Locket (Locked in Love)"	2008	Songwriter	Brandy	Human
4. "Bigger"	2009	Songwriter	Justin Bieber	My World
10. "Fish"	2011	Songwriter	Tyler, the Creator	Goblin
3. "I Miss You"	2011	Songwriter	Beyoncé	4
3. "She DGAF"	2011	Songwriter	The Internet	Purple Naked Ladies
10. "Pictures"	2012	Songwriter	Conor Maynard	Contrast
11. "Scared of Beautiful"	2012	Songwriter	Brandy	Two Eleven
12. "One Thing"	2012	Songwriter	Alicia Keys	Girl on Fire
14. "Hoarse"	2013	Songwriter, additional vocals	Earl Sweatshirt	Doris
9. "My Willing Heart"	2016	Songwriter	James Blake	The Colour in Anything
5. "Don't Do It!"; (with Kendrick Lamar)	2017	Songwriter	N.E.R.D	No One Ever Really Dies
6. "Royalty"; (featuring RaVaughn)	2019	Songwriter	Nas	The Lost Tapes 2
1. "Back to You (Remix)"	2020	Songwriter, studio personnel	Dapo Torimiro	Off the Hard Drives, Vol. 1
1. "Virginia Beach"	2023	Songwriter (Note: "Virginia Beach" samples a recorded 2012 Frank Ocean song titled "Wiseman"; "Wiseman" lacks an official release.)	Drake	For All the Dogs

== Music videos ==
List of music videos, showing year released and directors
As lead artist
Title	Year	Director(s)	Ref.
"Acura Integurl"	2011	Dave Wilson	
"Novacane"	2011	Nabil Elderkin	
"Thinkin Bout You"	2011	High5Collective	
"Swim Good"	2011	Nabil Elderkin	
"Pyramids"	2012	Nabil Elderkin	
"Lost"	2013	Francisco Soriano	
"Nikes"	2016	Tyrone Lebon	
"Biking"	2017	unknown	
"Provider"	2017	Tom Sachs	
As featured artist
Title	Year	Director(s)	Ref.
"She" (Tyler, the Creator featuring Frank Ocean)	2011	Wolf Haley	
"No Church in the Wild" (Jay-Z and Kanye West featuring Frank Ocean)	2012	Romain Gavras	
"Superpower" (Beyoncé featuring Frank Ocean)	2013	Jonas Åkerlund	

== See also ==
- Odd Future discography
