= Lens (Frank Ocean song) =

2017 single by Frank Ocean

Single by Frank Ocean
- Released: April 23, 2017
- Length: 3:47
- Label: Blonded

Frank Ocean singles chronology
"Biking" (2017)	"Lens" (2017)	"Provider" (2017)

"Lens" is a single by American R&B singer Frank Ocean. It debuted on episode 4 of Blonded Radio on April 23, 2017 and was released one day later on all streaming platforms.

== Production ==
"Lens" features warped, distorted vocals using Auto-Tune; personal and introspective lyrics about a complicated relationship; and a sparse keyboard background at a "slow and somber" pace that gradually grows in intensity toward the song's end.

== Critical reception ==
Fans and critics positively received Ocean's "prolific" releases—including "Lens" as well as other Blonded Radio singles like "Biking" and "Chanel"—following the anticipated, delayed rollout of his second studio album, Blonde. Some speculated that Ocean's Blonded Radio singles served as hints to an upcoming studio album, but a full-length project has yet to be announced. In particular, HelloGiggles wrote: "Is an experiment for Frank Ocean? Is blonded going to end up being his own way of sneaking through an entire album outside of the major music system? What else does Ocean have in store, especially as he hits the summer festival touring circuit?"

In Spin, Jordan Sargent argued that the single was a continuation of the unique, defining aesthetics which Ocean had established on Blonde: "That album was, in its own way, isolationist, anonymizing its high-profile collaborations and centering Ocean’s vocals over productions that often lacked percussion, as if he had created them in the sparest way possible, with just a keyboard and a guitar. 'Lens' extends this... This is the Frank Ocean people love—unpredictable, individualistic, and above all, honest." Sargent also noted the single's addressing of the "historical weight of being a queer black man", a theme which Ocean had also powerfully established in Blonde.

Vice Media called "Lens" "a mellow, self-reflexive track that has Frank crooning, auto-tuned at first" with allusions to "Chanel": "It grows from spare, mellow keys into more tense instrumentation: a pared-down, circling beat, Ocean’s own melodies echoing back; there are “smiles” and “sins” on him, but the latter wins out in the end."

Charlie Brinkhurst-Cuff, writing for The Guardian, wrote: "A sparse, vocoder-led hum of a track, slowly built up around layers of sound that lead to a blissful, stuttering climax, with lyrics that are an impenetrable, critically appealing mess of deep emotions. Lens will remind you of how smart Frank Ocean is and how not smart you are."

== Cover art ==
Immediately after the single's release, some speculated that the cover art for "Lens" was inspired by a 1980 painting by American artist Kerry James Marshall called A Portrait of the Artist As a Shadow of His Former Self, specifically "with the key parallel being a gap-toothed figure as the subject of both pieces". Marshall's painting had been inspired by Invisible Man by American novelist Ralph Ellison.

LAist observed the similarities between Ocean and Marshall's careers:

Frank Ocean was born in Long Beach and Kerry James Marshall grew up in South Central Los Angeles. They both reckon with image and the dichotomy of public and private life for black Americans, as well as the narratives American forces onto the life of black men. It makes perfect sense that Ocean would choose to recall Marshall's art with his new music release.

The cover art was created by portuguese graphic designer Bráulio Amado of B.A.D. Studio.

== Remix ==
A remix of "Lens", called "Lens V2", was released in addition to the original version. It features " an extended outro with swirling piano chords" as well as a feature verse from American rapper Travis Scott.
