= Miyaki =

Miyaki may refer to:

- Miyaki, Saga, a town in Saga Prefecture, Japan
- Miyaki District, a district in Saga Prefecture, Japan
- Miyaki Station, a railway station in Kamiina District, Nagano Prefecture, Japan
- Kirgiz-Miyaki, a rural locality in Bashkortostan, Russia
- Seiichi Miyake, Japanese inventor

== See also ==
- Tashaki Miyaki, an American rock band
