= Little Demon (song) =

2019 single by Frank Ocean

- Intended vinyl cover

Song by Frank Ocean featuring Skepta
- B-side: "Little Demon" (Arca Remix)
- Label: Blonded

Teaser video
- "Little Demon" (Arca Remix) on YouTube

Audio sample
- Audio sample of "Little Demon" (Arca Remix): file; help

"Little Demon" is a song by American singer Frank Ocean featuring vocals by British rapper Skepta. The song was intended to be sold as a 7-inch single in November 2019, but plans were scrapped in February 2020. The song was remixed by Venezuelan record producer Arca and previewed on Blonded Radio. The song has yet to be released digitally.

== Background ==
"Little Demon" is the first collaboration between Ocean and Skepta. In November 2018, Ocean initially teased "Little Demon" by sharing a snippet of the song on Instagram. In October 2019, Ocean resumed his Blonded Radio show on Beats 1 and began a series of queer-themed club nights entitled PReP+. He released the single "DHL" and sold the upcoming songs "Cayendo" and "Dear April" as 7-inch vinyl singles. On October 30, 2019, Ocean announced that his third PReP+ party would take place on Halloween and would be hosted by Venezuelan record producer Arca. During the party, Ocean and Arca debuted a new song featuring British rapper Skepta. The following day, Ocean released his follow-up single "In My Room" which was also sold on vinyl. The Skepta-featured song was then previewed as "Little Demon" on the ninth edition of Blonded Radio and sold as a 7-inch single.

== Release and promotion ==
In November 2019, Ocean put up "Little Demon" on sale as a 7-inch single. In February 2020, Ocean's website Blonded.co sent out an email that stated that the release of "Little Demon" on vinyl was canceled. The vinyl was planned to be replaced with "a new, unreleased Frank Ocean song" instead. However, this ended up getting canceled as well.

== Critical reception ==
Michael Saponara, writing for Billboard, described the song as melancholic.
