= Little Demon =

Little Demon may refer to:

- Little Demon (TV series)
- "Little Demon" (song), by Frank Ocean

== See also ==
- Little ogre, or little demon, a character in Soul Eater manga and anime
- The Petty Demon, novel by Fyodor Sologub
