= Tashaki Miyaki =

American rock band

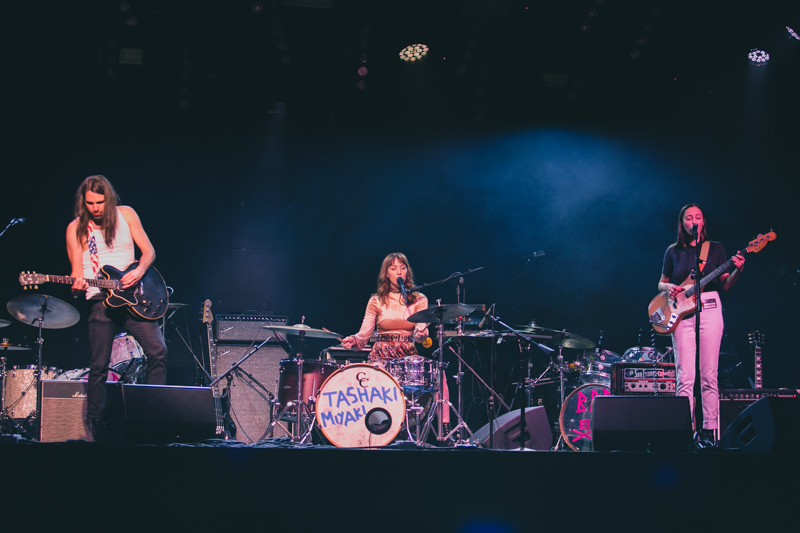
- Tashaki Miyaki performs in Los Angeles, 2015

Background information
- Origin: Los Angeles, California, United States
- Genres: Noise pop, dream pop, punk, indie rock, shoegaze, psychedelic, psychedelic folk
- Years active: 2011–present
- Labels: Luvluvluv Records, Metropolis, Tugboat Records
- Members: Paige Stark; Luke Paquin; Sandi Denton
- Past members: Dora Hiller

Tashaki Miyaki is an American rock band from Los Angeles, California. Formed in 2011, they immediately began to garner the attention of taste makers such as The Guardian, NME, Mojo Magazine, KCRW and The New York Times for their paisley underground/dream pop–inspired sound and cinematic videos. The band has cited Neil Young as a primary inspiration. After releasing a self titled EP, named a "top 10 EP of 2013" by the Huffington Post UK. and a series of singles, they released their debut LP The Dream on Metropolis Records on April 7, 2017. In April 2017, Frank Ocean played their song "Get It Right" on his Beats 1 Radio show Blonded Radio.

== Biography ==
The band began as a recording project in late 2011. After releasing their first EP, Tashaki Miyaki began performing live as a duo with Paige Stark on lead vocals/drums and Luke Paquin on guitar. In 2012 the band was invited to play both SXSW and CMJ Music Festivals as well as music festivals abroad. Around this time, bassist Dora Hiller began playing with the band live and on some recordings. Dora later left the band and was replaced by Sandi Rae Augusta Denton.

"The Dream" was released April 7, 2017 on Metropolis Records. It featured an expanded sound and lush string arrangements. The record was produced by drummer/singer/multi-instrumentalist, Paige Stark. Stark also produced their sophomore record, 'Castaway' which was released July 2, 2021 to favorable reviews, with The Guardian giving it 4/5 stars and noting the band "slowly shifting from intriguing to important.

Tashaki Miyaki have also contributed to recording & production on albums by fellow Angelenos and good friends Cherry Glazerr and L.A. Witch.

== Discography ==
Studio albums

- The Dream (2017)
- Castaway (2021)

EPs

- Tashak it to Me (2011)
- Tashaki Miyaki Sings the Everly Brothers (2012)
- Under Cover Vol. I (2012)
- Tashaki Miyaki (2013)
- Under Cover Vol. II (2015)

Singles

- Somethin' is Better Than Nothin' (2011)
- Best Friend (2012)
- Cool Runnings (2014)
- Girls on T.V. (2017)

Compilations

- "I Came" -Non Violent Femmes, (2014 Kanine Records)
- "I Only Have Eyes For You"- Lagniappe Sessions, Volume 1" (2016 Light in the Attic Records)
