= Homer (brand) =

American luxury brand

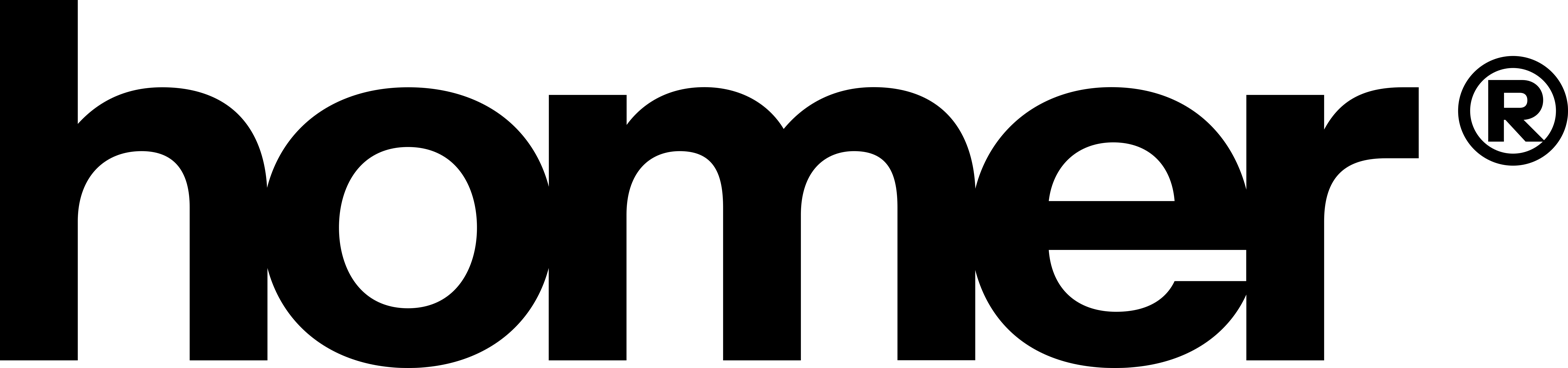
- Type: Private
- Industry: Jewelry
- Founded: 2018
- Founder: Frank Ocean
- Website: www.homer.com

Homer is an independent American luxury jewelry and accessories brand founded in 2018 and commercially launched in New York City in August 2021 by artist Frank Ocean.

The name Homer refers to the Ancient Greek author of the Iliad and the Odyssey.

== Products ==
The launch collection features high-end jewelry, using lab-grown diamonds crafted in the United States and hand-made in Italy, together with silk scarves and other accessories.

The jewelry is crafted using a combination of recycled sterling silver, 18 carat gold and set with diamonds, often also incorporating colorful, hand-painted enamel. Ocean’s designs are quoted as being inspired by the concepts of “… heritage as fantasy …” and “… childhood obsessions…”

In the Frankenstein-Cord collection comprises 925 sterling silver, 18 carat white and yellow gold and a premium 18 carat white gold and diamond version. For the earrings retail prices start at $495 and 18 carat yellow gold accessories can be priced up to $121,000. The Frankenstein-Cord campaign, on the brand's official Instagram post titled “You could be happy here,” stars Spanish musician Rosalía modeling the collection.

The brand’s catalogue features photography by Frank Ocean and Tyrone Lebon.

== Store ==
Homer has a flagship store in New York’s historic Jewelers’ Exchange on the Bowery. It was designed by Ocean in tandem with New York-based architects ANY. With the new resurrection of the brand and its design, they have created 2 new stores, one being in Los Angeles, and the other in London.

== Collaborations ==
In 2021, Homer collaborated with Italian luxury brand Prada on a limited, custom collection of branded clothing and accessories, including an anorak, belt bag and backpack, all featuring the brand’s distinctive color scheme. Originally, the collection was only available in the NYC store. If you couldn't make it to the store, customers would be sent a physical catalog to place their purchase. However, in 2021, Homer released their second collection online through the web store.

In July 2025, Homer released the Frankenstein-Cord collection in collaboration with designer Barry Kieselstein‑Cord of the Kieselstein-Cord brand a New York designer. This collection was timed in order with the brand’s expansion into new retail locations in London (Hatton Garden) and Los Angeles, as well as the rebrand of its original New York store.
