= List of awards and nominations received by Frank Ocean =

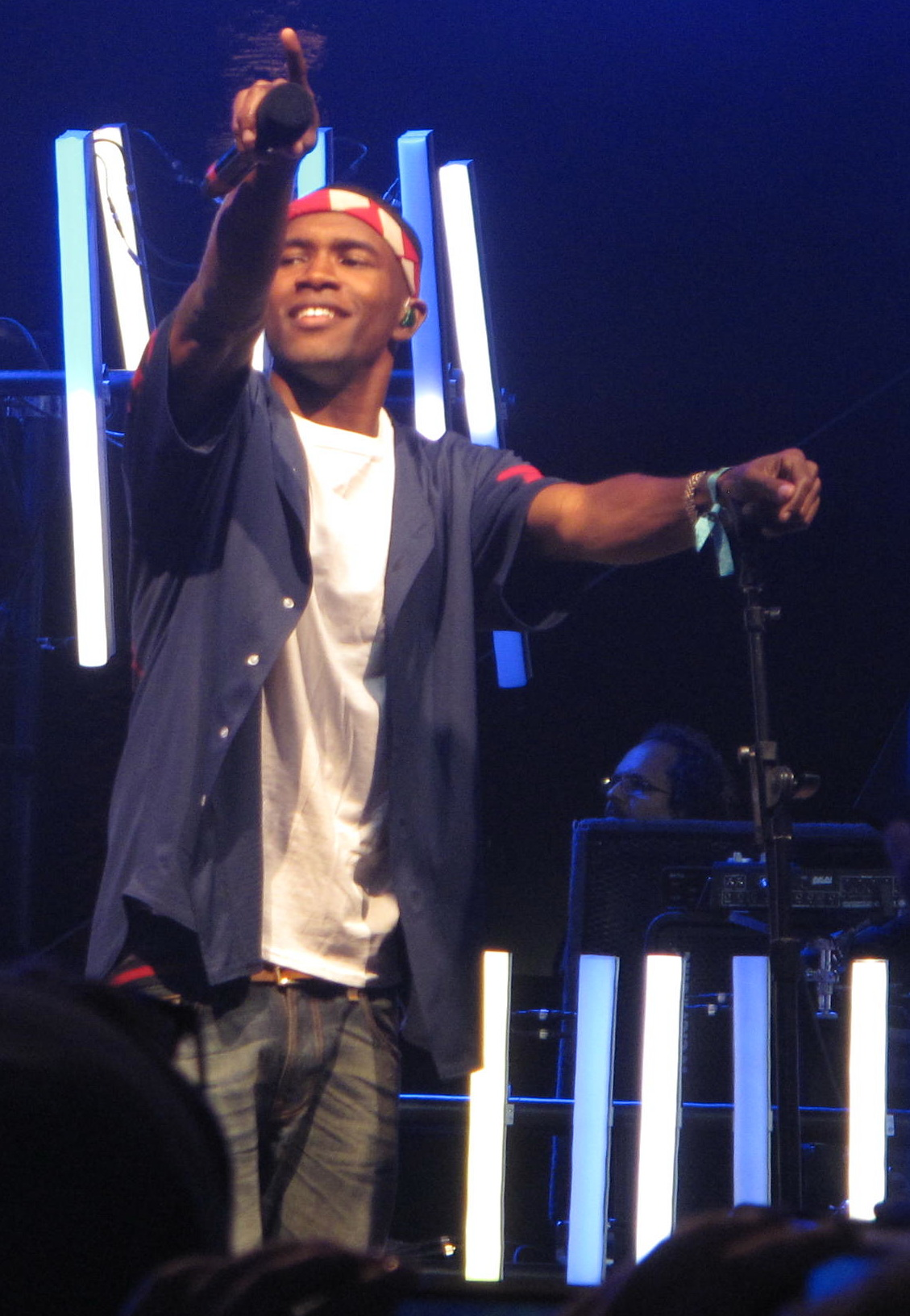
Frank Ocean in 2012

Frank Ocean and his music have received many award nominations and wins. As of February 2017, he won two Grammys, a Soul Train and UK Music Award. In addition, he earned accolades from GQ, NME, and Vibe magazines, as well as the BBC and mtvU.

== Attitude Magazine Awards ==
The Attitude Magazine (Gay, Men's Lifestyle). The annual awards are dedicated to honouring those who inspire and make change, making LGBT+ lives easier, influence and entertain. Attitude Awards winners are those who use their platform to show how talented and diverse the LGBT+ community is, whether they identify as LGBT+ or not, take the time to fight our corner. Ocean has received one award from one nomination.

Year	Nominee / work	Award	Result
2016	Frank Ocean	Artist of The Year	Won

== BET Hip Hop Awards ==
The BET Hip Hop Awards are hosted annually by BET for hip hop performers, producers and music video directors. Ocean has received two nominations.

Year	Nominee / work	Award	Result
2011	Nostalgia, Ultra	Best Mixtape	Nominated
2011	Frank Ocean	Rookie of the Year	Nominated

== Billboard Music Awards ==
The Billboard Music Awards honor artists for commercial performance in the U.S., based on record charts published by Billboard. The awards are based on sales data by Nielsen SoundScan and radio information by Nielsen Broadcast Data Systems. The award ceremony was held from 1990 to 2007, until its reintroduction in 2011. Before and after that time span, winners have been announced by Billboard, both in the press and as part of their year-end issue. Ocean has received four nominations.

Year	Nominee / work	Award	Result
2013	Channel Orange	Top R&B Album	Nominated
2013	Thinkin Bout You	Top R&B Song	Nominated
2017	Frank Ocean	Top R&B Artist	Nominated
2017	Blonde	Top R&B Album	Nominated

== Brit Awards ==
The Brit Awards are the British Phonographic Industry's annual pop music awards, and the British equivalent to the American Grammy Award. Ocean has received one award from one nomination.

Year	Nominee / work	Award	Result
2013	Frank Ocean	International Male Artist	Won

== GLAAD Media Awards ==
The GLAAD Media Awards were created in 1990 by the Gay & Lesbian Alliance Against Defamation to "recognize and honor media for their fair, accurate and inclusive representations of the LGBT community and the issues that affect their lives." Ocean has received one award from two nominations.

Year	Nominee / work	Award	Result
2013	Channel Orange	Outstanding Music Artist	Won
2017	Blonde	Outstanding Music Artist	Nominated

== Grammis ==
The Grammis Awards are the Swedish equivalent of the Grammy Awards. Ocean has received one nomination.

Year	Nominee / work	Award	Result
2012	Nostalgia, Ultra	International Album of the Year	Nominated

== Grammy Awards ==
The Grammy Awards are awarded annually by the National Academy of Recording Arts and Sciences. Ocean has received two awards from eight nominations.

Year	Nominee / work	Award	Result
2013	Channel Orange	Album of the Year	Nominated
2013	Channel Orange	Best Urban Contemporary Album	Won
2013	"Thinkin Bout You"	Record of the Year	Nominated
2013	"No Church in the Wild" (with Kanye West & Jay-Z)	Best Rap/Sung Collaboration	Won
2013	"No Church in the Wild" (with Kanye West & Jay-Z)	Best Short Form Music Video	Nominated
2013	Frank Ocean	Best New Artist	Nominated
2014	"New Slaves" (as songwriter)	Best Rap Song	Nominated
2015	Beyoncé (as featured artist)	Album of the Year	Nominated

Note: Ocean was nominated for Best Rap Song at the 56th Grammy Awards, for said nomination he was credited as Christopher Breaux and shared the nomination with Ben Bronfman, Mike Dean, Louis Johnson, Malik Jones, Elon Rutberg, Sakiya Sandifer, Che Smith, Kanye West, Travis Scott and Cydell Young.

== GQ Awards ==
Year	Nominee / work	Award	Result
2011	Frank Ocean	Rookie of the Year	Won

== HipHopDX Awards ==
The HipHopDX Awards are annual year-end awards hosted by online Hip-Hop magazine HipHopDX.

Year	Nominee / work	Award	Result
2011	Nostalgia, Ultra	Best Non-Hip Hop Album of the Year	Won
2012	Channel Orange	Best Non-Hip Hop Album of the Year	Won

== Los Premios 40 Principales ==
The Los Premios 40 Principales is an award presented by the musical radio station Los 40 Principales. It was created in 2006 to celebrate their fortieth anniversary. Ocean has received one nomination.

Year	Nominee / work	Award	Result
2016	Frank Ocean	Best Artist or Group - Critic's Choice	Nominated

== MOBO Awards ==
The Music of Black Origin (MOBO) Awards were established in 1996 by Kanya King. They are held annually in the United Kingdom to recognize artists of any race or nationality performing music of black origin. Ocean has received two nominations.

Year	Nominee / work	Award	Result
2012	Frank Ocean	Best International Act	Nominated
2016	Frank Ocean	Best International Act	Nominated

== MTV ==
=== MTV Video Music Awards ===
The MTV Video Music Awards were established in 1984 by MTV to celebrate the top music videos of the year. Ocean has received three nominations.

Year	Nominee / work	Award	Result
2012	"Swim Good"	Best Direction	Nominated
2012	"Swim Good"	Best Male Video	Nominated
2012	"Swim Good"	Best New Artist	Nominated

=== MTV Video Music Awards Japan ===
The MTV Video Music Awards Japan is the Japanese version of the MTV Video Music Awards. Initially, Japan was part of the MTV Asia Awards, which were part all Asian countries, but because of the musical variety existent in Japan, a factor that neighboring countries have not, in May 2002 they began to hold their own awards independently. Ocean has received one nomination.

Year	Nominee / work	Award	Result
2013	"Pyramids"	Best R&B Video	Nominated

=== mtvU ===
mtvU is an American digital cable television network that is owned by Viacom Music and Entertainment Group, a unit of the Viacom Media Networks division of Viacom. In addition to distribution on conventional cable systems, the channel is available to more than 750 college and university campuses across the United States as part of internally originated cable systems that are a part of on-campus housing or college closed-circuit television systems. Ocean has received one award from one nomination.

Year	Nominee / work	Award	Result
2012	Frank Ocean	Man of the Year	Won

=== mtvU Woodie Awards ===
mtvU, a division of MTV Networks owned by Viacom, broadcasts a 24-hour television channel available on more than 750 college and university campuses across the United States. mtvU holds an annual awards show, the mtvU Woodie Awards, in which winners are determined by online voting. Ocean has received two nominations.

Year	Nominee / work	Award	Result
2012	Frank Ocean	Woodie of the Year	Nominated
2013	Frank Ocean	FOMO (Fear of Missing Out) Woodie	Nominated

== NME Awards ==
The NME Awards is an annual music awards show in the United Kingdom, founded by the music magazine, NME (New Musical Express). The first awards show was held in 1953 as the NME Poll Winners Concerts, shortly after the founding of the magazine. Though the accolades given are entirely genuine, the ceremony itself is usually carried out in a humorous and jovial manner. Ocean has received one award from one nomination.

Year	Nominee / work	Award	Result
2017	Frank Ocean	International Male Artist	Won

== O Music Awards ==
The MTV O Music Awards is one of the major annual awards established by MTV to honor the art, creativity, personality and technology of music into the digital space. Ocean has received three nominations.

Year	Nominee / work	Award	Result
2012	Frank Ocean	Best Web Born Artist	Nominated
2013	Frank Ocean	Must Follow Artist on Twitter	Nominated
2013	"Pyramids"	Too Much Ass for TV	Nominated

== Q Awards ==
The Q Award were a United Kingdom's annual music awards run by the music magazine Q to honor musical excellence. Winners were voted by readers of Q online, with others decided by a judging panel. Ocean has received one nomination.

Year	Nominee / work	Award	Result
2012	Frank Ocean	Q's Next Big Thing	Nominated

== Soul Train Music Awards ==
The Soul Train Music Awards is an annual award show aired in national broadcast syndication that honors the best in African American music and entertainment established in 1987. Ocean has received one award from two nominations.

Year	Nominee / work	Award	Result
2011	Frank Ocean	Best New Artist	Nominated
2012	Channel Orange	Album of the Year	Won

== UK Music Video Awards ==
The UK Music Video Awards is an annual award ceremony founded in 2008 to recognise creativity, technical excellence and innovation in music videos and moving images for music. Ocean has received one award from two nominations.

Year	Nominee / work	Award	Result
2012	"Novacane"	Best Urban Video – International	Won
2013	"Pyramids"	Best Pop Video – International	Nominated

== Vibe Magazine ==
Vibe is an American music and entertainment magazine founded by producer Quincy Jones. The publication predominantly features R&B and hip-hop music artists, actors and other entertainers. The magazine's target demographic is predominantly young, urban followers of hip-hop culture. Ocean has received one award from one nomination.

Year	Nominee / work	Award	Result
2012	Frank Ocean	Man of the Year	Won

== Webby Awards ==
The Webby Award is an award for excellence on the Internet presented annually by The International Academy of Digital Arts and Sciences. Categories include websites, interactive advertising, online film and video, and mobile. Ocean has received one award from one nomination.

Year	Nominee / work	Award	Result
2013	Frank Ocean	Person of the Year	Won
