= Dear April =

2020 song by Frank Ocean

Single by Frank Ocean
- Released: March 25, 2020
- Genre: Ambient pop; R&B
- Length: 3:51
- Label: Blonded
- Songwriters: Frank Ocean; Daniel Aged
- Producers: Frank Ocean; Daniel Aged

Frank Ocean singles chronology
"In My Room" (2019)	"Dear April" / "Cayendo" (2020)

"Dear April" is a song by Frank Ocean, released as a 7-inch single on March 25, 2020, consisting of an "acoustic" version as side A, and a remix by Justice as side B. The acoustic version was released digitally on April 3, and was written and produced by Ocean and Daniel Aged.

== Background and release ==
In October 2019, Ocean previewed Justice's remix of the track at his PrEP+ club night, and made the 7-inch single available to pre-order on his website, alongside "Cayendo". On March 25, 2020, the vinyls began to ship, while the acoustic A-side was released on digital platforms on April 3.

== Composition ==
Ocean wrote and produced the song with Daniel Aged. It has been characterised as an ambient pop and R&B ballad, featuring a dream-like atmosphere with jazz-influenced guitars and "synth-like washes". Described as the "spiritual successor" to certain of Ocean's songs such as "Self Control" and "Skyline To", the acoustic version of "Dear April" features stripped instrumentation consisting of "slow-motion jazz guitar figures and Sandman sprinkles of keyboard", putting an emphasis on the "melancholy of his voice." The lyrics appear to address a person rather than the month of April.

== Critical reception ==
Pitchfork's Marc Hogan described the song as potentially Ocean's "most understated stunner yet", writing: "It's not the Ocean you would've wanted to see at the now-postponed Coachella, but it's the Ocean we needed to hear holed up alone together in our bedrooms."

== Track listing ==
7-inch single
No.	Title	Length
1.	"Dear April" (acoustic)	3:51
2.	"Dear April" (Justice remix)	4:11

== Charts ==
Chart (2020)	Peak position
Ireland (IRMA)	88
New Zealand Hot Singles (RMNZ)	4
