= Cayendo =

Single by Frank Ocean
- Language: Spanish; English
- English title: "Falling"
- B-side: "Cayendo" (Sango remix)
- Released: March 25, 2020
- Genre: R&B
- Length: 3:22
- Label: Blonded
- Songwriter: Frank Ocean
- Producers: Frank Ocean; Daniel Aged

Frank Ocean singles chronology
"In My Room" (2019)	"Cayendo" / "Dear April" (2020)

"Cayendo" is a song by Frank Ocean, released as a 7-inch single on March 25, 2020, concurrently with "Dear April". It consists of an "acoustic" version as side A, and a remix by Sango as side B. The acoustic version was released on digital platforms on April 3. Ocean wrote the song, and co-produced it with Daniel Aged.

== Background and release ==
In October 2019, Ocean made the 7-inch singles for "Cayendo" and "Dear April" available to pre-order on his website, after previewing Sango's remix of the track at his PrEP+ club night. On March 25, both vinyls began to ship, with the acoustic A-side being released on digital platforms on April 3.

== Composition ==
The track was written by Ocean, and produced by Ocean and Daniel Aged. The R&B ballad has been described as "emotional" and "heart-wrenching", with lyrics sung in both Spanish and English. The track's title translates to "Falling" in English.

== Track listing ==
7-inch single
No.	Title	Length
1.	"Cayendo" (acoustic)	3:22
2.	"Cayendo" (Sango remix)	2:34

== Charts ==
Chart (2020)	Peak position
New Zealand Hot Singles (RMNZ)	10
US Hot Latin Songs (Billboard)	8

== Certifications ==
Region	Certification	Certified units/sales
New Zealand (RMNZ) Side A acoustic version	Gold	15,000^{‡}
^{‡} Sales+streaming figures based on certification alone.
