= No World =

Studio album by Inc. No World
- Released: February 19, 2013
- Recorded: 2012
- Genre: Alternative R&B
- Length: 41:30
- Label: 4AD
- Producer: Andrew Aged; Daniel Aged

Inc. No World chronology
3 (2011)	No World (2013)	As Light As Light (2016)

Singles from No World
- 1. "The Place" Released: October 3, 2012; 2. "5 Days" Released: December 3, 2012

Professional ratings
Aggregate scores
Source	Rating
Metacritic	67/100
Review scores
Source	Rating
Pitchfork Media	7.0/10.0

No World (stylized as no world) is the debut studio album by American electronic music duo Inc. No World, released on February 19, 2013 through 4AD. "The Place", a single from the album, was featured in the Grand Theft Auto V soundtrack.

== Track listing ==
No.	Title	Length
1.	"The Place"	3:41
2.	"Black Wings"	4:05
3.	"Lifetime"	4:34
4.	"5 Days"	4:14
5.	"Trust (Hell Below)"	4:30
6.	"Your Tears"	1:31
7.	"Angel"	3:59
8.	"Seventeen"	3:34
9.	"Desert Rose (War Prayer)"	3:56
10.	"Careful"	4:27
11.	"Nariah's Song"	2:59
Total length:		41:30

iTunes Bonus Track
No.	Title	Length
12.	"Voices"	4:23

== Personnel ==
- Andrew Aged – vocals, production
- Daniel Aged – vocals, production
