= DHL (song) =

2019 single by Frank Ocean

Single by Frank Ocean
- Released: October 19, 2019
- Length: 4:28
- Label: Blonded
- Songwriter(s): Frank Ocean; Alexander Ridha; Jennifer Ivory; George Jones; Starleana Taylor; Stephen Washington
- Producer(s): Frank Ocean; Boys Noize; Noah Goldstein; Daniel Aged

Frank Ocean singles chronology
"Moon River" (2018)	"DHL" (2019)	"In My Room" (2019)

"DHL" is a song by Frank Ocean, released as a single on October 19, 2019. Prior to being released for digital download and streaming, the track was premiered at the end of Ocean's Beats 1 radio show, Blonded Radio. Its release followed the day after Ocean announced the tracks "Cayendo" and "Dear April". It was Ocean's first release since his cover of "Moon River" was released in February 2018 and it was his first original song since releasing "Provider" in August 2017.

The song was described "dark" and "spacey" by The Fader.

== Critical reception ==
Sheldon Pearce for Pitchfork called Ocean's performance "as cavalier as he’s ever sounded, and it suits him."

== Charts ==
Chart performance for "DHL"
Chart (2019)	Peak position
Canada (Canadian Hot 100)	99
Ireland (IRMA)	57
New Zealand Hot Singles (RMNZ)	2
UK Singles (OCC)	67
US Billboard Hot 100	98
US Rolling Stone Top 100	38
