= Frank Ocean =

American singer (born 1987)

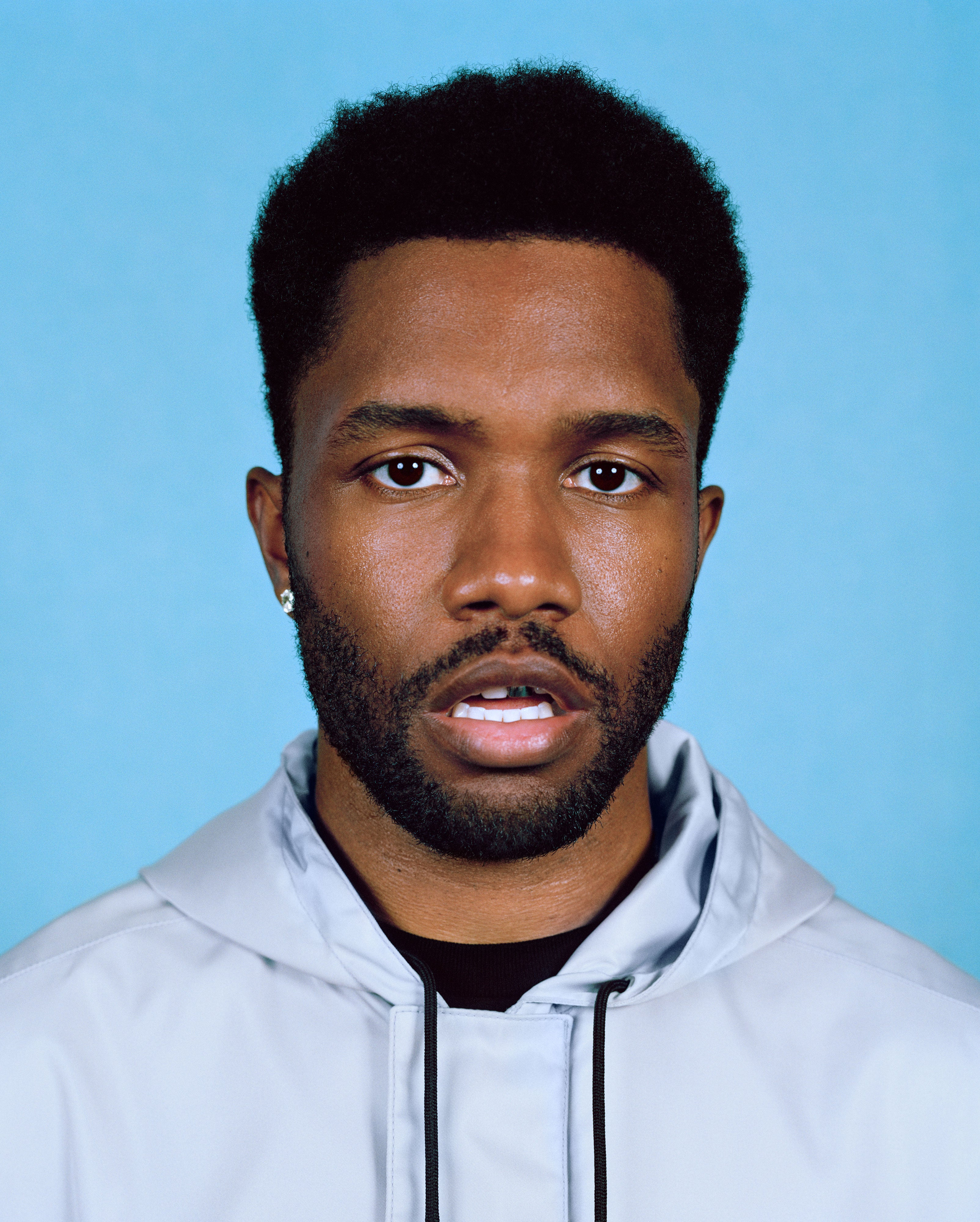
- Ocean in 2021
- Born: Christopher Edwin Breaux; October 28, 1987 (age 39); Long Beach, California, U.S.
- Other names: Lonny Breaux; Christopher Francis Ocean
- Occupations: Singer; songwriter; rapper; record producer
- Years active: 2006–present
- Organization: Homer
- Works: Discography
- Awards: Full list
- Musical career
- Origin: Los Angeles, California, U.S.
- Genre: Alternative R&B
- Instruments: Vocals; keyboards; guitar
- Labels: Blonded (Note: Frank Ocean became independent of any record label in August 2016. He released his album Blonde on Boys Don't Cry, the reissue of his video album Endless on Fresh Produce, LP, and all singles featured on Blonded Radio on Blonded.); Def Jam; RedZone
- Formerly of: Odd Future
- Website: blonded.co

Frank Ocean (born Christopher Edwin Breaux, October 28, 1987) is an American singer and songwriter. His accolades include two Grammy Awards and a Brit Award. He has been credited by several music critics as a pioneer of the alternative R&B genre.

Ocean began his musical career as a ghostwriter before joining the Los Angeles-based hip-hop collective Odd Future in 2010. The year prior, he signed with RedZone Entertainment, an imprint of Def Jam Recordings, although his debut mixtape, Nostalgia, Ultra (2011), was released independently. His debut studio album, Channel Orange (2012) won Best Urban Contemporary Album; its lead single, "Thinkin Bout You", was nominated for Record of the Year. He was named by Time as one of the world's 100 most influential people in 2013.

After a four-year hiatus, Ocean released the visual album Endless (2016) to fulfill contractual obligations with Def Jam. His second studio album, Blonde, was released independently the following day. Blonde was met with critical praise, and debuted atop the US Billboard 200. After 2017, Ocean has released sporadic singles, worked as a photographer for magazines, launched the fashion brand Homer, and started Homer Radio. Ocean has sold over 2 million albums worldwide.

== Early life and education ==
Ocean was born Christopher Edwin Breaux on October 28, 1987, in Long Beach, California, to Calvin Cooksey, a singer and keyboardist, and Katonya Breaux Riley, an entrepreneur. His parents divorced when he was six years old, and he was raised by his mother. At age five, his family moved to New Orleans, Louisiana. Ocean was raised Christian and spent a brief period as a practicing Catholic.

Ocean's maternal grandfather Lionel McGruder Jr. was a father figure for Ocean after his father left the family. Lionel was a recovering drug addict and later served as a mentor at Alcoholics Anonymous and Narcotics Anonymous meetings. He would take Ocean to these meetings, which was the inspiration behind Ocean's song "Crack Rock" from his debut album Channel Orange. He also gave him the nickname Lonny, which Frank Ocean still uses today. He died in 2010 and Frank Ocean dedicated a song to him called "There Will Be Tears" on his mixtape Nostalgia, Ultra. He also mentioned him on his 2017 single "Lens".

After graduating from John Ehret High School in Marrero, Louisiana in 2005, Ocean enrolled in the University of New Orleans to study English. However, Hurricane Katrina struck New Orleans in August 2005, destroying his home and personal recording facility and forcing him to transfer to the University of Louisiana at Lafayette. He stayed there for a brief time before dropping out to focus on his music career.

== Career ==
=== 2006–2011: Career beginnings, Odd Future and Nostalgia, Ultra ===
In 2006, Ocean moved to Los Angeles to pursue his music career, working at various fast-food and service jobs to support himself. In less than three years, he established himself as a songwriter under the name Lonny Breaux. After getting a songwriting deal, Ocean wrote songs for artists including Justin Bieber, Beyoncé, John Legend, and Brandy. Ocean later said of his work at the time, "There was a point where I was composing for other people, and it might have been comfy to continue to do that and enjoy that income stream and the anonymity. But that's not why I moved away from school and away from family".

He adopted the stage name Frank Ocean, getting the name from Frank Sinatra and the 1960 heist film Ocean's 11, which Sinatra starred in. Soon after, he joined Los Angeles-based hip-hop collective Odd Future, whom he had met in 2009. His friendship with Odd Future member Tyler, the Creator reinvigorated Ocean's songwriting. In late 2009, he met Tricky Stewart, who helped him sign a writing contract with Def Jam Recordings. Ocean felt neglected by the label, and began working on a mixtape on his own without their input. On February 16, 2011, Ocean self-released the resulting mixtape, Nostalgia, Ultra online for free. The mixtape received critical acclaim. The mixtape focuses on interpersonal relationships, personal reflection and social commentary. NPR's Andrew Noz said Ocean's songwriting is "smart and subtle...setting him apart from the pack". Rolling Stone magazine's Jonah Weiner wrote that Ocean was a "gifted avant-R&B smoothie".

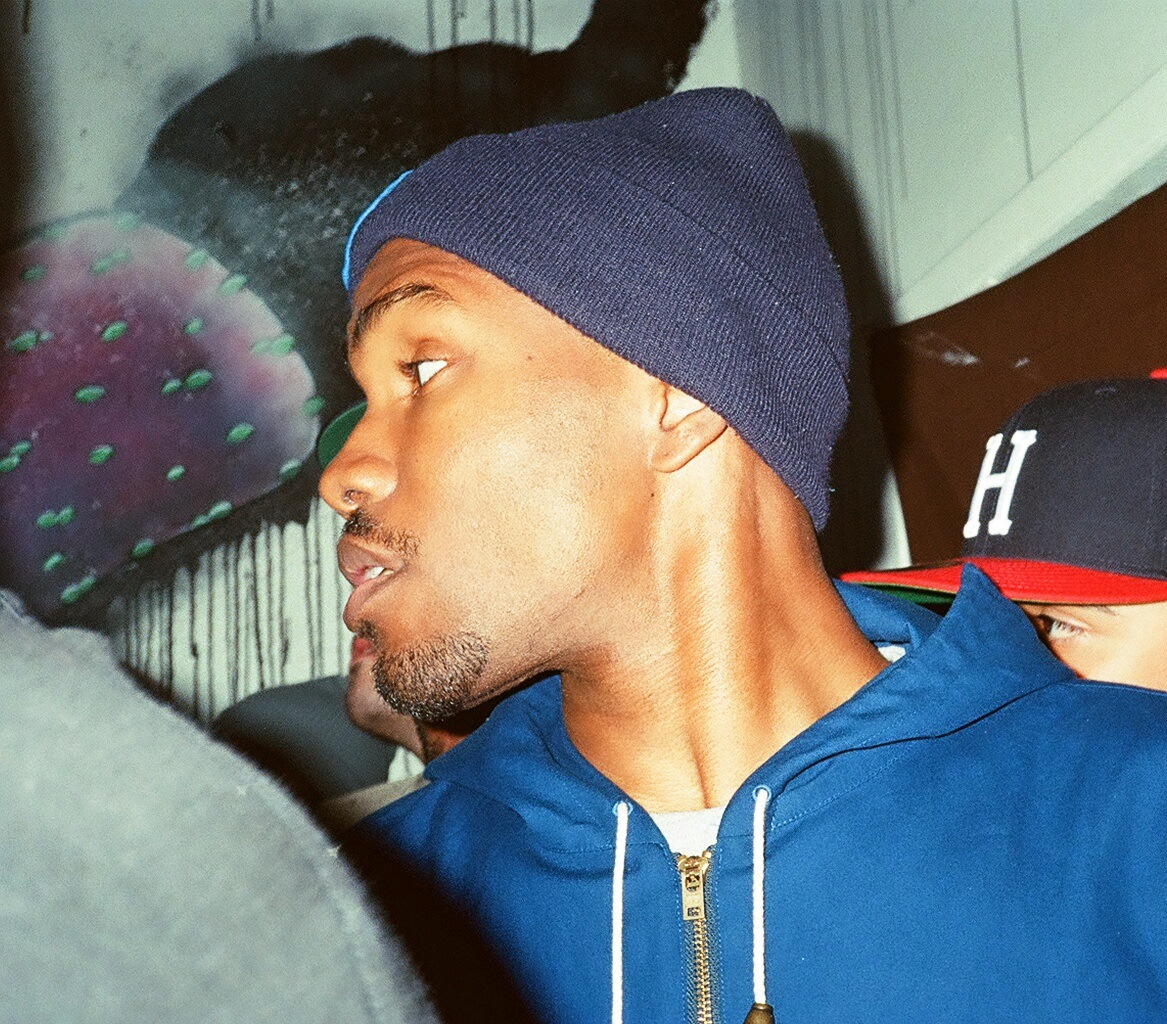
Ocean in 2011

In April 2011, Ocean stated that his relationship with Def Jam had strengthened since the release of the Nostalgia, Ultra. The mixtape made Ocean widely known and led to his collaborations with rappers Jay-Z and Kanye West. Ocean first appeared in Tyler, the Creator's music video for the single "She", from Tyler's second studio album Goblin (2011). His first performance was in collaboration with Odd Future at Coachella in 2011, where he later joined them for their first tour across the east coast of the United States. On May 19, 2011, Ocean's record label Def Jam announced its plans to re-release Nostalgia, Ultra as an EP. The single "Novacane" was released to iTunes in May 2011, and the EP originally was set to be released the next month, but was delayed.

In June 2011, Ocean revealed that he would work on the upcoming Kanye West and Jay-Z collaborative album, Watch the Throne. Ocean co-wrote and featured on two tracks: "No Church in the Wild" and "Made in America". On July 28, 2011, a song titled "Thinkin Bout You", leaked on the internet. It was later revealed the song was a reference track, written by Ocean, for Roc Nation artist Bridget Kelly's debut studio album. Kelly renamed the song 'Thinking About Forever'. In September 2011, a music video directed by High5Collective for Ocean's version was released, yet the song still appeared on Kelly's debut EP Every Girl. In August 2011, Frank Ocean made his first appearance on the cover of the publication The Fader, in its 75th issue.

=== 2012–2013: Channel Orange ===
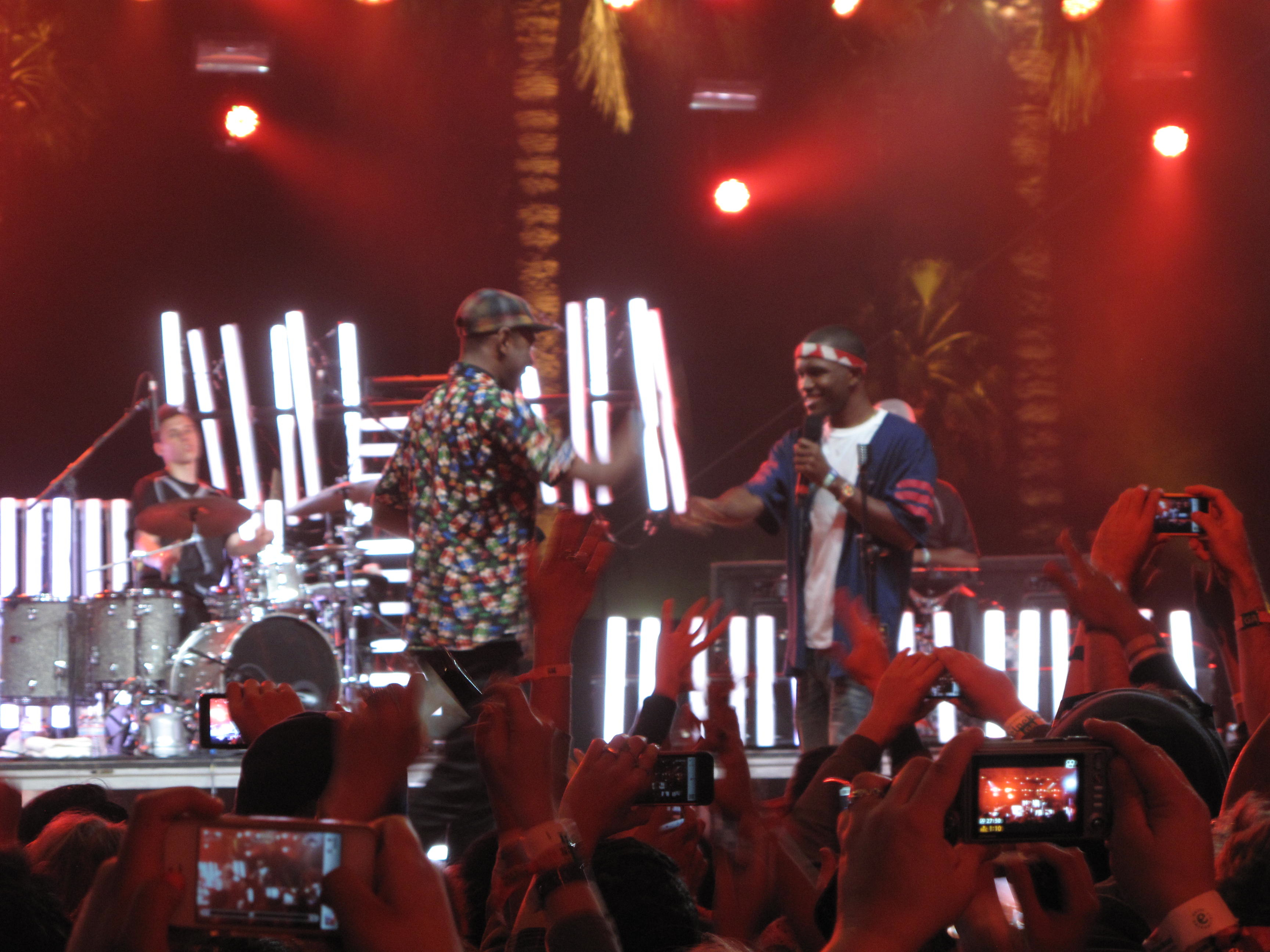
Ocean (right) with Tyler, the Creator at Coachella in April 2012

Ocean released the cover art for his debut studio album's lead single, titled "Thinkin Bout You", revealing the song would be released to digital retailers on April 10, 2012. However, a month earlier, a re-mastered version of the song had already leaked. About the prospective single he said: "It succinctly defines me as an artist for where I am right now and that was the aim", he said of the follow-up to his acclaimed Nostalgia, Ultra. "It's about the stories. If I write 14 stories that I love, then the next step is to get the environment of music around it to best envelop the story and all kinds of sonic goodness".

Perhaps this is R&B's Ziggy Stardust moment, where the controversy and publicity surrounding an artist's sexuality and the brilliance of his latest album combine to give his career unstoppable momentum.

— Alexis Petridis, 2012

On July 10, 2012, Ocean released his debut studio album Channel Orange to universal acclaim from critics, who later named it the best album of the year in the HMV's Poll of Polls. It also earned Ocean six Grammy Award nominations and was credited by some writers for moving the R&B genre in a different, more challenging direction. Considered as Ocean's first commercial release on a traditional record label, Channel Orange featured unconventional songs that were noted for their storytelling and social commentary, and a dense musical fusion that drew on jazz, soul, and R&B. Funk and electronic music also influenced his album. The songs about unrequited love in particular received the most attention, partly because of Ocean's announcement prior to the album's release, when he revealed that his first love was a man. The announcement made global headlines, and some critics compared its cultural impact to when David Bowie revealed that he was bisexual in 1972.

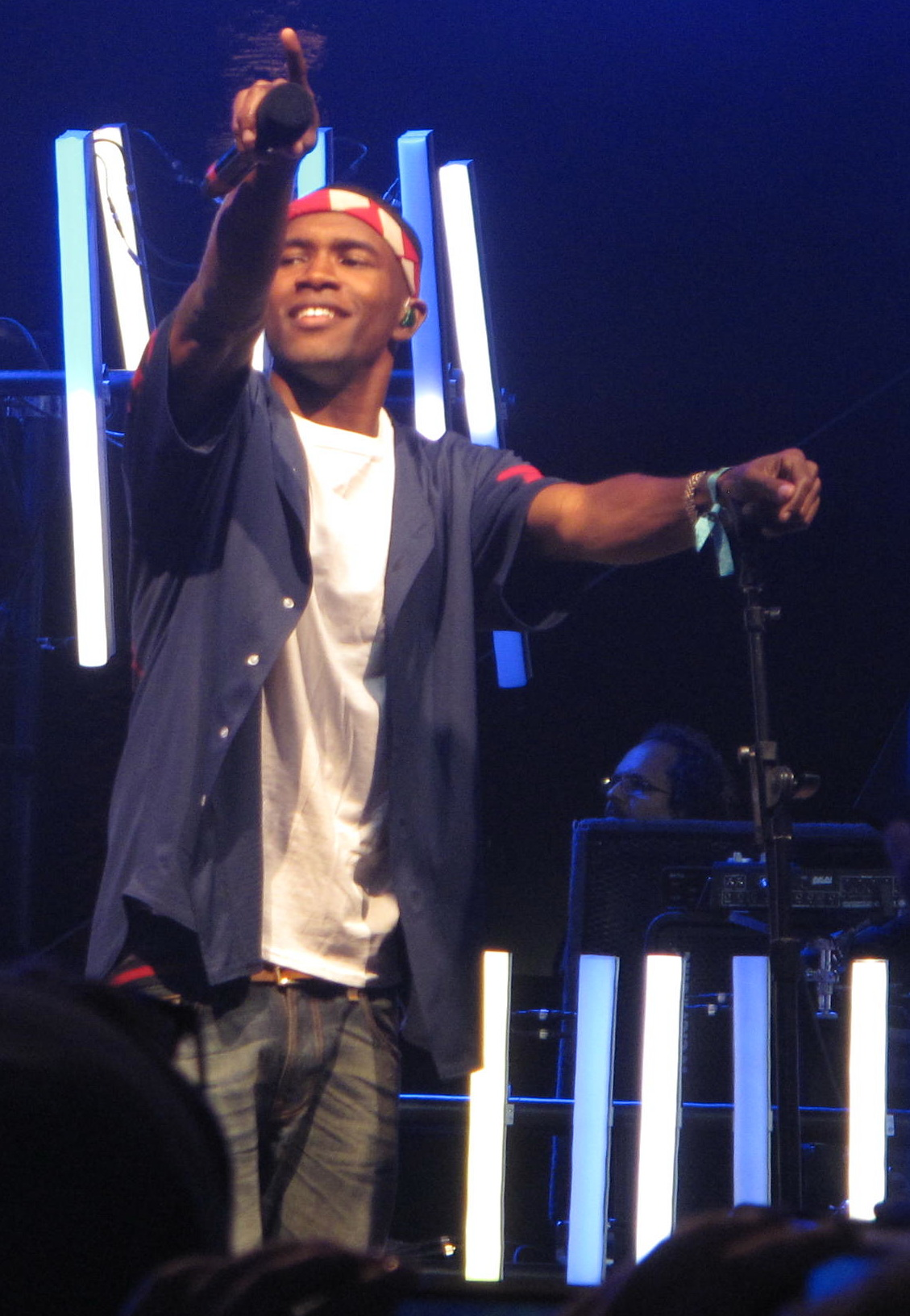
Ocean performing at Coachella 2012

Channel Orange debuted at number two on the Billboard 200 and sold 131,000 copies in its first week. The majority of its first-week sales were digital copies from iTunes, while approximately 3,000 of the sales were physical copies. On January 30, Channel Orange was certified gold by the RIAA. By September 2014, it had sold 621,000 copies, according to Nielsen SoundScan. Ocean promoted the album with his 2012 Summer Tour, which featured final appearances at the Coachella and Lollapalooza festivals. At the 2013 Brit Awards, Ocean won the Brit Award for International Male Solo Artist.

On May 28, 2013, Ocean announced the You're Not Dead ... 2013 Tour; a fourteen-date European and Canadian tour that began on June 16, 2013, in Munich. He had been scheduled to perform at the first night of OVO Fest on August 4, 2013; however he was forced to cancel his appearance due to a small vocal cord injury. The first night of the music festival was subsequently cancelled and James Blake was booked to appear during the second night as Ocean's replacement. Ocean appeared on John Mayer's album Paradise Valley, as a featured artist on a song called "Wildfire".

=== 2013–2016: Endless and Blonde ===
In February 2013, Ocean confirmed that he had started work on his second studio album, which he confirmed would be another concept album. He revealed that he was working with Tyler, the Creator, Pharrell Williams, and Danger Mouse on the record. He later stated that he was being influenced by The Beach Boys and The Beatles. He stated he was interested in collaborating with Tame Impala and King Krule and that he would record part of the album in Bora Bora.

On March 10, 2014, the song "Hero" was made available for free download on SoundCloud. The song is a collaboration with Mick Jones, Paul Simonon and Diplo and is a part of Converse's Three Artists. One Song series.

In September 2014, critical success and musical awards enabled new management and representation for Ocean. Ocean signed with Mark Gillespie of Three Six Zero Entertainment.

In June, Billboard reported that the singer was working with a string of artists such as Happy Perez (whom he worked with on Nostalgia, Ultra), Charlie Gambetta and Kevin Ristro, while producers Hit-Boy, Rodney Jerkins and Danger Mouse were also said to be on board. On November 29, 2014, Ocean released a snippet of a new song supposedly from his upcoming follow-up to Channel Orange called "Memrise" on his official Tumblr page. The Guardian described the song as: "...a song which affirms that despite reportedly changing labels and management, he has maintained both his experimentation and sense of melancholy in the intervening years".

On April 6, 2015, Ocean announced that his follow-up to Channel Orange would be released in July. The album was ultimately not released in July, with no explanation given for its delay. The publication was rumoured to be called Boys Don't Cry, and the album was slated to feature the aforementioned "Memrise". In February 2016, Ocean was featured on Kanye West's album The Life of Pablo on the track "Wolves" along with Vic Mensa and Sia. A month later, the song was re-edited by West, and Ocean's part was separated and listed on the track list as its own song titled "Frank's Track".

In July 2016, he hinted at a possible second album with an image on his website pointing to a July release date. The image shows a library card labeled Boys Don't Cry with numerous stamps, implying various due dates. The dates begin with July 2, 2015, and conclude with July 2016. Ocean's brother, Ryan Breaux, further suggested this release with an Instagram caption of the same library card photo reading "BOYS DON'T CRY #JULY2016".

By August 1, 2016, at approximately 3 am, an endless live stream shot in negative lighting in what is allegedly a Brooklyn warehouse, sponsored by Apple Music began to surface on boysdontcry.co which appeared to show Ocean woodworking and sporadically playing instrumentals on loop. It later became clear that these instrumentals were from his upcoming visual album Endless; the full version is estimated to be 140 hours long. That same day, many news outlets reported that August 5, 2016, could be the release date for Boys Don't Cry. That date also turned out to be inaccurate, though in a Reddit AMA session, his collaborator Malay said that Ocean is a perfectionist, constantly tweaking things, and that his art cannot be rushed.

Frank Ocean is a scammer. He's a scammer for the way he got out of his Universal contract. (...) That f**ked up a lot of artists, he didn't care. Lost a lot of artist revenue streams, took Apple out the game, he didn't care. He had one album left to deliver to Def Jam and they had a hard time negotiating around that. It's rumored that Apple gave Frank Ocean the money to give Def Jam to even everything out and handed them an album, and then he was out of that deal. But then the very next day, he put out the other album on Apple.

— Cultural critic Joe Budden discussing Frank Ocean's Endless and his 2016 contractual dispute with Def Jam Recordings.

On August 18 and 19, 2016, the live stream was accompanied with music and at midnight an Apple Music link was directed to a project called Endless. Endless would be Ocean's last album with Def Jam Recordings to fulfill his contract with the record label. Before the visual album's release on Apple Music, Ocean had already begun making efforts to part ways with Def Jam, who signed the artist in 2009. He describes his negotiations with the label as a "seven-year chess game", while adding that he had replaced many of his representatives (including his lawyer and manager) during the process, as well as having to buy back all of his master recordings that previously belonged to Def Jam.

At midnight Pacific time on August 20, 2016, a music video for a song titled "Nikes" was uploaded to Ocean's page on Apple Music and later to his own website. Also on August 20, Ocean announced pop-up shops in Los Angeles, New York City, Chicago, and London for his magazine Boys Don't Cry, and released his second studio album Blonde to widespread acclaim. Blonde debuted at number one in several countries, including the United States and the United Kingdom, and recorded sales of 232,000 copies (275,000 with album-equivalent units) in its first week.

Rather than going on a typical promotional tour playing radio festivals and appearing on television shows, Ocean spent a month after the release of Blonde, traveling to countries such as China, Japan and France. He also chose not to submit Blonde for consideration at the Grammy Awards, stating "that institution certainly has nostalgic importance; it just doesn't seem to be representing very well for people who come from where I come from, and hold down what I hold down". Time ranked it as the best album of 2016 on its year-end list. Forbes estimated that Blonde earned Ocean nearly one million in profits after one week of availability, attributing this to him releasing the album independently and as a limited exclusive release on iTunes and Apple Music. On July 9, 2018, Blonde was certified platinum by the RIAA.

=== 2017–2020: Blonded Radio and singles ===
On February 21, 2017, Scottish DJ and producer Calvin Harris announced his single "Slide", in which Ocean and hip-hop trio Migos were featured. The single was released two days later and is from Harris' fifth studio album Funk Wav Bounces Vol. 1. Ocean and Migos are credited with featured vocals and Ocean and Migos members, Quavo and Offset are credited songwriting, while production is handled by Harris. The other Migos member, Takeoff is not in the song. The song was released on February 23, 2017, and featured on the first episode of Ocean's Beats 1 radio show, Blonded Radio. It is also Ocean's first recorded collaboration since leaving Def Jam Recordings, with Ocean being listed in the liner notes as "appear[ing] courtesy of Frank Ocean".

The song went on to be certified double platinum by the Recording Industry Association of America and became Ocean's first top ten single on the Billboard Mainstream Top 40 chart, peaking at number nine. On March 10, 2017, Ocean released a new single "Chanel" on the second episode of Blonded Radio, as well as playing an alternate version featuring American rapper ASAP Rocky. The song was his first solo effort to be released after Blonde and Endless in 2016. On subsequent episodes of Blonded Radio in April, Ocean premiered "Biking" featuring Jay-Z and Tyler, the Creator, "Lens", as well as an alternate version featuring Travis Scott, and a remix of Endless track "Slide On Me" featuring Young Thug. On May 15, Ocean was featured on ASAP Mob's "Raf", premiered on Blonded alongside a solo version of "Biking". On August 28, Ocean released another single, "Provider", on Blonded Radio.

In October 2017, Ocean published a photo essay titled "New 17" to British magazine i-D. In the essay, Ocean said "If you liked two thousand and seventeen then you'll love two thousand and eighteen". In November 2017, Ocean hinted via Tumblr that his fifth project was complete. However it is unknown when or if it will be released. Ocean's voice appears in the video game Grand Theft Auto V, as he plays himself hosting an in-game radio station called Blonded Los Santos 97.8 FM. He also lent the songs "Provider", "Ivy", "Crack Rock", "Chanel", "Nights" and "Pretty Sweet" to the game, and sings the radio station jingles.

On February 14, 2018, Ocean released "Moon River", a cover of the song performed by Audrey Hepburn in the 1961 film, Breakfast at Tiffany's. In May 2018, Ocean was featured on the tracks "Brotha Man" and "Purity" from ASAP Rocky's third studio album Testing. In August 2018, Ocean featured on the song "Carousel" from Travis Scott's third studio album Astroworld, which released on the same day. In September 2018, it was reported that Ocean took legal action against Scott through a cease and desist letter. Ocean later confirmed through a Tumblr post that the dispute was about social issues, not music, and had since been resolved between the two artists. On November 6, 2018, three midterm specials of Blonded Radio were aired throughout the day, in collation with the Midterm elections that were held in the US, as well as the release of new merchandise given for free to those with proof of voting in Houston, Atlanta, Miami, and Dallas. The shows themselves did not include any new songs by Ocean, but included various political discussions including a discussion about Ocean being an openly queer black man in contemporary rap music.

On February 5, 2019, Ocean's Tumblr account was hacked hinting info about more of Ocean's material. The posts have since been deleted. On October 19, 2019, Ocean released a new song titled "DHL" on Blonded Radio and announced 7-inch vinyl singles of two new songs on his website titled "Dear April" and "Cayendo", originally available only as physical singles featuring B-side remixes from Justice and Sango, respectively. On November 1, 2019, Ocean followed up "DHL" with a new song titled "In My Room", which was premiered on Blonded Radio, and soon after on November 3 posted online another vinyl single of a new song titled "Little Demon" featuring a B-side remix by Arca. However, on February 25, 2020, Ocean announced that he will replace "Little Demon" with an unreleased song which would be released on February 28, 2020. The vinyl for "Little Demon" was canceled and refunds were provided.

Ocean was set to headline at Coachella in October 2020. Due to the COVID-19 pandemic, the festival was initially postponed until October 9–11 and October 16–18, but in June, Riverside County public health officers announced it and Stagecoach had been cancelled altogether. In August 2021, Coachella co-founder Paul Tollett confirmed that Ocean will headline the festival in 2023. From March 25, 2020, Ocean's website started shipping the vinyl singles for "Dear April" and "Cayendo", as well as the previously released "In My Room", although many reported later having issues in receiving vinyl orders or receiving refunds for canceled orders. Remixes of the two tracks had previously been teased during his club night DJ set PrEP+. The vinyl issues and exclusivity encouraged listeners to leak these two songs onto sites like Twitter and SoundCloud, and the two songs were officially released digitally on April 3.

=== 2021–present: Homer and hiatus from music ===
On August 8, 2021, Frank Ocean officially revealed his first fashion project, 'Homer', initially announced by the singer in a Financial Times interview. In a Q&A sent in the press release, Homer was simply described as "an independent American luxury company founded by Frank Ocean". In an Instagram story, Frank wrote: "This project has kept my mind moving and my imagination turning throughout it all. (...) My hope is to make things that last, that are hard to destroy, see it in stone. (...) This is 3 years in the making and there is so much I'm excited to share with all you strangers. Love". The jewelry company, which has already collaborated with Prada, cites inspiration from "childhood obsessions" and "heritage as a fantasy".

On December 25, 2021, Ocean released a new 9-minute untitled song on his Beats 1 radio show, Blonded Radio featuring music contribution from Cory Henry. In June 2022, it was announced that Ocean was in talks to direct his first feature film, with A24 producing. In October, Ocean revealed Homer Radio, a weekly Apple Music 1 broadcast described as a window of what plays around their office after hours.

On January 10, 2023, Coachella announced Ocean would be headlining the festival on April 16 and 23, his first live performances since 2017. Ocean began his set nearly an hour after his scheduled start time on April 16 and was forced to end the show early due to local curfew restrictions. The performance was widely criticized by both fans and music critics, especially for not being live streamed on YouTube, like most of the other performances from the festival. No professional photographers were allowed in the audience and no merchandise was available to fans. The effort Ocean gave to his performance was regarded as mediocre by many and disappointing for an artist that had not performed live music in six years. He would go on to cancel his appearance at the festival's second weekend, citing a leg injury.

Nearly two years after his Coachella performance, it was rumored that Ocean, a self-described cinephile, was considering a career in filmmaking and was scouting locations in Mexico for his first feature film. His directorial debut was confirmed in January 2025, with David Jonsson announced as the lead, along with Taylor Russell also starring, and that the movie was set to shoot in Mexico City, although its title, plot details, and release dates were not confirmed.

== Musical style ==
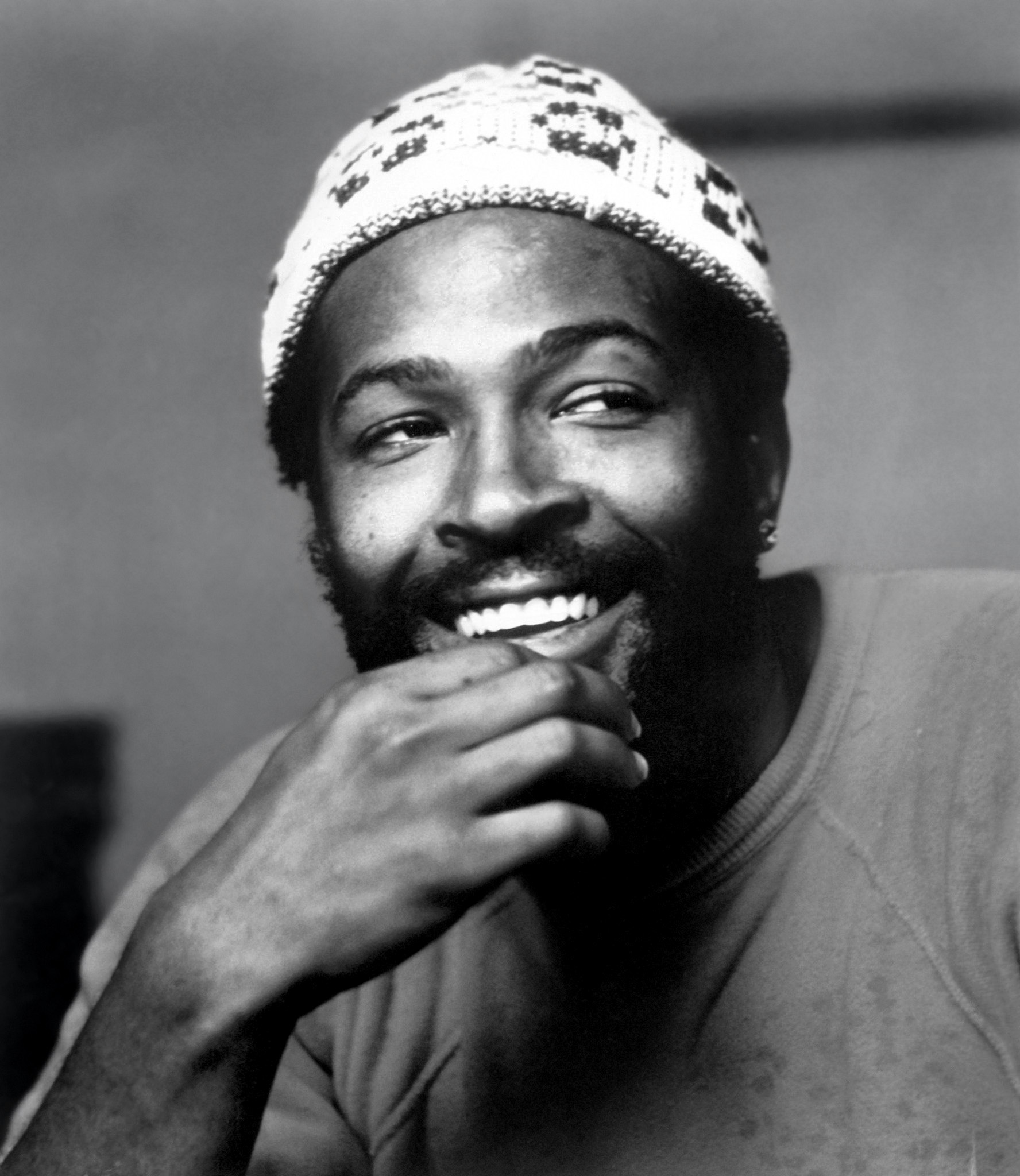
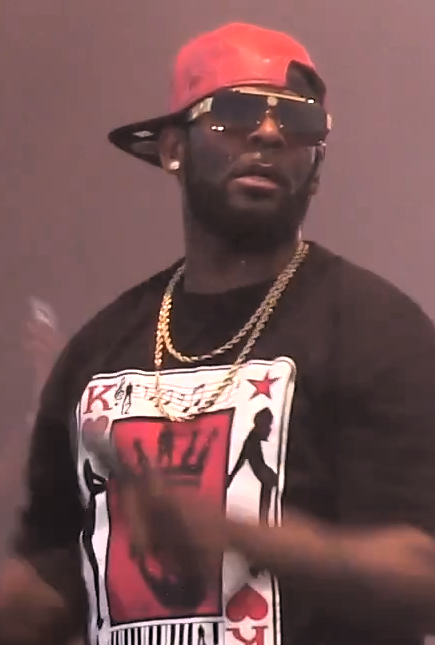
Ocean cites Marvin Gaye and R. Kelly among his main musical inspirations.

Ocean's music has been characterized by music writers as idiosyncratic in style. His music generally includes the electronic keyboard, often performed by Ocean himself, and is backed by a subdued rhythm section in the production. His compositions are often midtempo, feature unconventional melodies, and occasionally have an experimental song structure. In critical commentaries, he has been characterised as an "avant-garde R&B artist", and an "avant-soul singer". Steven Hyden called him "an introspective psych-soul balladeer".

In Ocean's songwriting, Jon Pareles of The New York Times observes "open echoes of self-guided, innovative R&B songwriters like Prince, Stevie Wonder, Marvin Gaye, Maxwell, Erykah Badu and particularly R. Kelly and his way of writing melodies that hover between speech and song, asymmetrical and syncopated". Jody Rosen of Rolling Stone calls him a torch singer due to "his feel for romantic tragedy, unfurling in slow-boiling ballads". Ocean's stage presence during live shows has been described by Chris Richards of The Washington Post as "low-key". While Nostalgia, Ultra featured both original music by Ocean and tracks relying on sampled melodies, Channel Orange showcased Ocean as the primary musical composer, of which music journalist Robert Christgau opines, "when he's the sole composer Ocean resists making a show of himself—resists the dope hook, the smart tempo, the transcendent falsetto itself".

Ocean's lyrics deal with themes of love, longing, misgiving, and nostalgia. His debut single "Novacane" juxtaposes the numbness and artificiality of a sexual relationship with that of mainstream radio, while "Voodoo" merges themes of spirituality and sexuality, and is an eccentric take on such subject matter common in R&B. The latter song was released by Ocean on his Tumblr account and references both the traditional spiritual "He's Got the Whole World in His Hands" and the female anatomy in its chorus: "she's got the whole wide world in her juicy fruit / he's got the whole wide world in his pants / he wrapped the whole wide world in a wedding band / then put the whole wide world on her hands / she's got the whole wide world in her hands / he's got the whole wide world in his hands".

According to Corbon Goble of Stereogum, the lyrical "moods" of "Voodoo" are indicative of Ocean's "sometimes-bleak, depressive lyrical tendencies", while MTV News writer Tirhakah Love such songs are among Ocean's most distinctive for how they transfigure the meaning behind short-term and long-term memory, and "disrupt the flow of linear time by prompting us to dive deep into our own memories and feel something indelibly real". Certain songs on Channel Orange allude to Ocean's experience with unrequited love.

== Impact ==
Music critics have credited Ocean for pioneering alternative R&B, approaching R&B music differently to his contemporaries with an idiosyncratic style. Both Insider and The Wall Street Journal regarded Ocean as the most dominant artist of the 2010s decade. He was included in the 2013 edition of the Time's list of the 100 most influential people in the world and the 2017 edition of the Forbes 30 Under 30.

Andy Kellman of AllMusic wrote,

Frank Ocean has been one of the more fascinating figures in contemporary music since his early-2010s arrival. A singer and songwriter whose artful output has defied rigid classification as R&B, he has nonetheless pushed that genre forward with seemingly offhanded yet imaginatively detailed narratives in which he has alternated between yearning romantic and easygoing braggart.

Culture critic Nelson George asserts that, along with Miguel, Ocean has "staked out ground where [he is] not competing with those hit-driven [commercial R&B] acts" and is "cultivating a sound that balances adult concerns with a sense of young men trying to understand their own desires (an apt description of Ocean, particularly)". Writing for Business Insider, Callie Ahlgrim said that Ocean "changed our very understanding of modern music", and that he discusses themes like youth, innocence, lost love, loneliness, desire, and mortality in his music in a way that "feels fresh and extraordinary [and] makes the introspective sound universal and transcendent [which] is why he's one of the defining artists of our time".

Jacob Shamsian of Business Insider said that Ocean "isn't just one of the most important artists in pop, he's one of the most important artists in all of music". In a GQ article titled "Why Frank Ocean is a musical icon", Jon Savage described Ocean as a "consummate contemporary artist in every sense who is immersed in new sonic possibilities, one who is deeply committed to artistic exploration in the most profound sense". Savage praised Ocean for taking R&B to a "new level [through] constructing startling sound pictures that fit his lyrics". Pitchfork regarded Ocean as a "master of confessional songwriting, earning a cult-icon status with his enigmatic persona and idiosyncratic approach to pop". In 2023, Rolling Stone ranked Ocean at number 190 on its list of the 200 Greatest Singers of All Time.

== Photography ==
On August 20, 2016, Ocean released a 360-page magazine, Boys Don't Cry, alongside his second album Blonde. The fashion and automobile-themed publication contains the photo projects from Wolfgang Tillmans, Viviane Sassen, Tyrone Lebon, Ren Hang, Harley Weir, Michael Mayren and Ocean himself. Four months later, British magazine Print published another photowork from Frank Ocean.

On May 1, 2017, Ocean attended the annual Met Gala as a special photographer for Vogue. On October 23, 2017, he made two covers and a visual essay for British fashion magazine, i-D.

== Personal life ==
=== Family ===
Ocean's younger brother, Ryan Breaux, was killed in a car crash on August 2, 2020, at the age of 18. The crash was a single vehicle collision that led Breaux to be pronounced dead at the scene.

=== Sexual orientation ===
Ocean wrote an open letter, initially intended for the liner notes on Channel Orange, that preemptively addressed speculation about his attraction in the past to another man. Instead, on July 4, 2012, he published the open letter on his Tumblr blog recounting unrequited feelings he had for another young man when he was 19 years old, citing it as his first true love. He used the blog to thank the man for his influence, and also thanked his mother and other friends, saying, "I don't know what happens now, and that's alright. I don't have any secrets I need kept anymore... I feel like a free man". Numerous celebrities publicly voiced their support for Ocean following his announcement, including Beyoncé and Jay-Z.

Members of the hip-hop industry generally responded positively to the announcement. Tyler, the Creator and other members of Odd Future tweeted their support for Ocean. Russell Simmons wrote a congratulatory article in Global Grind in which he said, "Today is a big day for hip-hop. It is a day that will define who we really are. How compassionate will we be? How loving can we be? How inclusive are we? [...] Your decision to go public about your sexual orientation gives hope and light to so many young people still living in fear". When asked if he considers himself bisexual in a 2012 interview, Ocean stated: "I'll respectfully say that life is dynamic and comes along with dynamic experiences, and the same sentiment that I have towards genres of music, I have towards a lot of labels and boxes and shit".

In June 2016, following the Orlando nightclub shooting that killed 49 people, Ocean published an essay expressing his sadness and frustration. He mentioned that his first experience with homophobia and transphobia was with his father when he was six years old, and related how many people pass on their hateful values to the next generation and send thousands of people down suicidal paths. In 2017, Ocean's father subsequently sued him for defamation and requested $14.5 million. On October 17, 2017, after a hearing that saw Ocean and both of his parents taking the stand, the presiding judge ruled in favor of Ocean, stating that his father had not provided sufficient evidence of defamation.

=== Name change ===
In a 2011 interview, Ocean stated that he had attempted to change his name to Christopher Francis Ocean through a legal website on his 23rd birthday. The change was reportedly partly inspired by the 1960 film Ocean's 11. In March 2014, it was reported that he was legally changing his name to Frank Ocean. In November 2014, it was revealed that the name change had not been legalized due to multiple speeding offences. It was finally legalized on April 23, 2015.

=== Political views ===
In 2019, Ocean encouraged British fans to vote for the Labour Party in the 2019 UK general elections, via his Instagram story.

Ocean has expressed solidarity with the people of the Gaza Strip during the ongoing Gaza war. He signed an October 2023 Artists4Ceasefire open letter of artists urging then-President Joe Biden to call for an immediate ceasefire in Gaza.

== Legal controversies ==
Ocean sampled The Eagles' 1977 "Hotel California" on his track "American Wedding", which was featured on his debut mixtape Nostalgia, Ultra. Ocean made no secret of the fact that he "loved Don Henley...the Eagles...and Joe Walsh's immaculate guitar playing". Although the track's unveiling led to controversy, ultimately it was never commercially released and no legal action ensued. It was noted that Ocean made no money off the track, with the artist himself stating that he was "paying homage" to The Eagles' Don Henley with the release. "I didn't make a dime off that song. I released it for free. If anything, I'm paying homage".

On January 27, 2013, in the parking lot of a Los Angeles recording studio, an altercation occurred between Frank Ocean and R&B singer Chris Brown. Police officers in Los Angeles said Brown was under investigation, describing the incident as "battery" due to Brown allegedly punching Ocean. Ocean said he would not press charges, while a member of Ocean’s entourage and Brown sued each other over the incident. According to the police report, Ocean told investigators that he confronted Brown in the lobby of Westlake Recording Studios after seeing him parked in his assigned space. Ocean said Brown extended his hand, but after he refused to shake it and reiterated that Brown was in his parking spot, Brown punched him in the face. Ocean alleged that Brown’s associates, Omololu Akinolou and Glass John, then joined the attack, pushing him into a corner and attempting to kick him while he was on the ground. The entire altercation, according to Ocean, lasted approximately one to two minutes. According to Jamaican singer Sean Kingston, who was present during the altercation, Ocean and his cousin instigated the fight and were at fault. The two artists had previously feuded on Twitter in 2011.

In March 2014, Ocean was set to perform a cover of the song "Pure Imagination" in a Chipotle Mexican Grill commercial that was due to promote responsible farming. Following a review of the final storyboard, Ocean's legal team sent Chipotle a letter, explaining that he felt obliged to withdraw from the arrangement, noting that "When Frank was asked to participate in this project, Chipotle's representatives told him that the thrust of the campaign was to promote responsible farming. There was no Chipotle reference or logo in the initial presentation, and Chipotle told Frank that was an intentional element of the campaign". Ocean effectively honoured the arrangement by repaying Chipotle via cashier's check in the sum of $212,500. The commercial, titled "The Scarecrow", was subsequently released with Fiona Apple performing the song.

In February 2017, Ocean's father, Calvin Cooksey, filed a defamation lawsuit against him seeking $14.5 million in damages. The lawsuit concerned a 2016 Tumblr post in which Ocean described an alleged childhood incident in which Cooksey had used an anti-gay slur against a transgender waitress. Cooksey denied that the incident occurred and alleged that Ocean's account had damaged his financial opportunities in film and music. Ocean denied the allegations and filed multiple affirmative defenses. In 2017, Judge Stephen V. Wilson upheld most of Ocean's defenses but criticized many of his responses as lacking factual support and warned that the court could consider sanctions if he continued using unsupported arguments or litigation tactics that obscured the issues in the case.

== Discography ==
Studio albums

- Channel Orange (2012)
- Blonde (2016)

== See also ==
- List of American Grammy Award winners and nominees
