= Carousel (Travis Scott song) =

2018 song by Travis Scott featuring Frank Ocean

Song by Travis Scott featuring Frank Ocean

from the album Astroworld
- Released: August 3, 2018
- Genre: Alternative hip hop
- Length: 3:00
- Label: Cactus Jack; Epic; Grand Hustle
- Songwriters: Jacques Webster II; Mike Dean; Christopher Breaux; Chauncey Hollis; Rick Rubin; Adam Horovitz; Adam Yauch; Michael Diamond
- Producers: Hit-Boy; Rogét Chahayed (co.); Dean(co.)

"Carousel" (stylized in all caps) is a song by American rapper Travis Scott featuring Frank Ocean, released on August 3, 2018 as the second track off of the former's third studio album Astroworld (2018), released through Cactus Jack Records, Epic Records, and Grand Hustle Records. The song was written by Scott and Ocean, alongside the song's producers, Hit-Boy, Rogét Chahayed, and Mike Dean. The song includes a sample of the Beastie Boys' 1986 single "The New Style", and thus, they and Rick Rubin are also credited as songwriters.

Upon its release, the song was received positively by music critics, who mainly praised Ocean's contributions and the Beastie Boys sample. Commercially, it charted at number 24 on the Billboard Hot 100 and peaked at number 15 on the Hot R&B/Hip-Hop Songs charts. both in the United States. It also made charts in countries such as Australia, Canada, France, the Netherlands, New Zealand, Sweden, and the United Kingdom. It was additionally certified Platinum in the United States, Canada, and Brazil, and was also certified Gold in Australia.

== Critical reception ==
"Carousel" received positive reviews from outlets, with many praising Frank Ocean's contributions to the track. Among them was Spin's Ezra Marcus had heavy praise for Ocean's feature, saying that his "words stand out as an oasis of effortless chill." Roisin O'Connor labelled the Beastie Boys sample as "Superb" and called Ocean's appearance "exquisite, blissful even, as his signature, rich-yet-husky voice floats over delicate chords" Somewhat contrary, while praising Ocean's hook, The Fader's Ben Dandridge-Lemco found the verses to be "Unremarkable".

== Commercial performance ==
In the United States, the song charted at number 24 on the Billboard Hot 100 and peaked at number 15 on the Hot R&B/Hip-Hop Songs, the highest peak on any chart it made. It was additionally certified Platinum by the Recording Industry Association of America (RIAA) for equivalent sales of 1,000,000 units in the States. In Australia, the song charted at number 99 on the ARIA Charts and was certified Gold by the Australian Recording Industry Association (ARIA) for equivalent sales of 35,000 units in the country. In Brazil, although the song did not chart, it was certified Platinum by Pro-Música Brasil (PMB) for equivalent sales of 40,000 units in the country.

In Canada, the song charted at number 20 on the Canadian Hot 100 and was certified Platinum by Music Canada (MC) for equivalent sales of 80,000 units in the country. In France, the song charted at number 70 on the SNEP charts. In the Netherlands, the song charted at number 79 on the Dutch Single Top 100. In New Zealand, the song charted at number 30 on the New Zealand Singles Chart. In Sweden, the song charted at number 73 on the Sverigetopplistan chart. In the United Kingdom, the song charted at number 29 on the UK Singles Chart.

== Controversy ==
On September 14, 2018, it was reported that Frank Ocean had filed a cease and desist to get his vocals removed from the song, as it was claimed that his vocals were pitch shifted. Ocean responded to the reports on his Tumblr, saying that he approved of the song's current mix and stated that was not the problem. He explained that it was about social issues relating to sexuality, writing on Tumblr, "THE CEASE AND DESIST WASN’T ABOUT 🔊 IT WAS ABOUT 🏳️‍🌈. ME AND TRAVIS RESOLVED IT AMONGST OURSELVES WEEKS AGO. 💖" Travis Scott confirmed he was on good terms with Ocean in an Instagram post, calling Ocean a "true inspiration in an out of the Stu. Gang."

== Charts ==
Chart (2018–2019)	Peak position
Australia (ARIA)	99
Canada Hot 100 (Billboard)	20
France (SNEP)	70
Netherlands (Single Top 100)	79
New Zealand (Recorded Music NZ)	30
Sweden (Sverigetopplistan)	73
UK Singles (OCC)	29
US Billboard Hot 100	24
US Hot R&B/Hip-Hop Songs (Billboard)	15

== Certifications ==
Region	Certification	Certified units/sales
Australia (ARIA)	Gold	35,000^{‡}
Brazil (Pro-Música Brasil)	Platinum	40,000^{‡}
Canada (Music Canada)	Platinum	80,000^{‡}
New Zealand (RMNZ)	Gold	15,000^{‡}
United States (RIAA)	Platinum	1,000,000^{‡}
^{‡} Sales+streaming figures based on certification alone.
