= Provider (Frank Ocean song) =

Single by Frank Ocean
- Released: August 27, 2017
- Genre: R&B
- Length: 4:03
- Label: Blonded
- Songwriters: Christopher Breaux; Joe Thornalley; Josiah Sherman
- Producers: Buddy Ross; Frank Ocean; Vegyn

Frank Ocean singles chronology
"Lens" (2017)	"Provider" (2017)	"Moon River" (2018)

"Provider" is a song by American singer-songwriter Frank Ocean, released as a single on the seventh episode of Blonded Radio. Shortly after the release, Ocean released a lyric video for the song on his website, with the words on screen being highlighted by a hopping Hello Kitty head.

== Background ==
During the first hour of the 2017 MTV Music Video Awards show, Frank Ocean premiered a surprise episode of Blonded Radio. At the end of the mix, "Provider" was played on loop featuring several different versions with intro and outro variations.

== Track listing ==
Digital download
No.	Title	Length
1.	"Provider"	4:03

== Certifications ==
Certifications for "Provider"
Region	Certification	Certified units/sales
New Zealand (RMNZ)	Gold	15,000^{‡}
^{‡} Sales+streaming figures based on certification alone.
