= Biking (song) =

2017 single by Frank Ocean

Single by Frank Ocean featuring Jay-Z and Tyler, the Creator
- Released: April 10, 2017
- Genre: Alternative hip hop; R&B
- Length: 4:38
- Label: Blonded
- Songwriters: Christopher Breaux; Shawn Carter; Tyler Okonma; Adam Feeney; Jacob Ludwig Olofsson; Rami Dawood
- Producers: Frank Dukes; Jarami

Frank Ocean singles chronology
"Chanel" (2017)	"Biking" (2017)	"Lens" (2017)

Jay-Z singles chronology
"Shining" (2017)	"Biking" (2017)	"4:44" (2017)

Tyler, the Creator singles chronology
"Telephone Calls" (2016)	"Biking" (2017)	"Who Dat Boy" (2017)

Alternate cover
- Original Apple Music cover

"Biking (Solo)"

Single by Frank Ocean
- Released: May 15, 2017
- Length: 3:32
- Label: Blonded
- Songwriters: Christopher Breaux; Adam Feeney; Jacob Ludwig Olofsson; Rami Dawood
- Producers: Frank Dukes; Jarami

Frank Ocean singles chronology
"Lens" (2017)	"Biking (Solo)" (2017)	"RAF" (2017)

"Biking" is a song by American singer-songwriter Frank Ocean, released as a single on the third episode of Blonded Radio. It features guest vocals from American rappers Jay-Z and Tyler, the Creator. On 15 May 2017, a solo version of the track was released, following the sixth episode of Blonded Radio. It was featured in Season 2 of the HBO television series Insecure.

== Background ==
"Biking" followed the release of two other Frank Ocean songs: "Slide" and "Chanel". The song was produced by Frank Dukes, Jarami, and Caleb Laven.

== Charts ==
Chart (2017)	Peak position
New Zealand Heatseekers (RMNZ)	9
US Bubbling Under R&B/Hip-Hop Singles (Billboard)	7

== Certifications ==
Region	Certification	Certified units/sales
New Zealand (RMNZ)	Platinum	30,000^{‡}
United Kingdom (BPI)	Silver	200,000^{‡}
^{‡} Sales+streaming figures based on certification alone.

== Release history ==
Country	Date	Format	Label	Ref.
Worldwide	April 10, 2017	Digital download	Blonded	

Country	Date	Format	Label	Ref.
Worldwide	May 15, 2017	Digital download	Blonded	
