= Blonded Radio =

Radio show hosted by Frank Ocean

blonded RADIO
- Home station: Apple Music 1
- Hosted by: Frank Ocean; Vegyn; Roof Access
- Original release: February 24, 2017
- No. of episodes: 16

Blonded Radio (stylized as blonded RADIO) is Frank Ocean's Apple Music 1 radio show that originally lasted from February to August 2017, with four additional special episodes that aired in November and December 2018, four more episodes from October to December 2019, and another episode in December 2021. The show is hosted by Ocean, Vegyn, and Roof Access and usually airs a new single from Ocean each episode. A fictional radio station based on the show, titled "Blonded Los Santos 97.8 FM", was added to the video game Grand Theft Auto V in December 2017.

== History ==
=== Original run (2017) ===
Episode 001, aired on February 24, 2017. The episode showcased the collaborative song "Slide" by record producer Calvin Harris featuring Ocean and rappers Quavo and Offset from the American hip hop group Migos. The episode also included an interview with Jay-Z talking about the current state of radio and the music industry. Episode 002 aired on March 10, 2017, with the single "Chanel", a song about Ocean's bisexuality. The episode ended with repeats of "Chanel", sometimes featuring a verse from rapper ASAP Rocky.

Episode 003 aired on April 8, 2017. The episode ended by playing a new single titled "Biking", featuring rappers Jay-Z and fellow Odd Future member Tyler, the Creator who have both previously collaborated with Ocean. He previously streamed a trailer for the song on his website, featuring a different instrumental.

Episode 004 aired on April 23, 2017. The episode featured "Lens", which included an alternative version featuring rapper Travis Scott. The next morning, Episode 005 aired with a Young Thug remix of the song "Slide On Me" from Ocean's 2016 video album Endless.

Episode 006 aired on May 15, 2017. The episode aired with the first single from ASAP Mob's then-upcoming album Cozy Tapes Vol. 2: Too Cozy. RAF features vocals from ASAP Rocky, Quavo, Lil Uzi Vert, two different rap verses from Ocean, and additional vocals from Playboi Carti. A solo version of "Biking" with no featured artists and a new third verse was also aired. After a summer hiatus due to Ocean performing at music festivals, Episode 007 aired on August 27, 2017, with the single "Provider".

=== Hiatus and specials (2017–2019) ===
On December 12, 2017, a fictionalized version of the show was launched in Grand Theft Auto V and its online counterpart Grand Theft Auto Online, as an in-game radio station called blonded Los Santos 97.8 FM, as part of a content update.

On November 6, 2018, three midterm specials were aired throughout the day, in collation with the midterm elections that were held in the United States, as well as the release of new merchandise given to those with proof of voting for free in Houston, Atlanta, Miami, and Dallas. On December 25, 2018, Ocean premiered "blonded Xmas", a curated Christmas music playlist. None of these episodes featured any new music.

A Blonded Radio poster was put up on sale on February 24, 2019, with a message reading:

Thanks to all the heads who tuned in to our show. Blonded is about the friendship between feelings, noise, and conversation. Don't hold your breath for anything in life and live it for you. Feel the world round you and see it with more than your eyeballs. If you can't see anymore than that right now, keep sending out a positive charge everywhere loud and wide as possible, and so will we. Love you.

=== Return to air and PrEP+ (2019) ===
On October 19, 2019, Ocean hosted his first PrEP+ party. It was described as an “homage to what could have been of the 1980s' NYC club scene if the [HIV-preventing] drug PrEP (pre-exposure prophylaxis)... had been invented in that era.” The poster for the event featured the words “Blonded Radio”. During the party, two remixes were played for unreleased songs by Ocean: Dear April (Justice Remix) and Cayendo (Sango Remix). New merchandise was made available on the blonded.co website following the event, as well as a listing for both songs on vinyl. Highlights from the event were aired on blonded 008 the same day, including the new song “DHL”, which released soon after the event.

On October 24, 2019, the second PrEP+ party was held, which featured Ocean's remix of fellow artist SZA's song “The Weekend”. All four of the DJs at the event (Leeon, Arca, Papi Juice and Shyboi) were queer. The song was never featured on blonded Radio.

On October 31, 2019, the third party took place. It was themed around Halloween. The party also featured an unreleased collaboration with British rapper Skepta, called “Little Demon (Arca Remix)”. The song aired during blonded 009, on November 3, 2019, alongside “In My Room”.

On November 9, 2019, Episode 010 aired, and became the first ever episode to feature no new music.

On December 24, 2021, a new Christmas special episode of Blonded Radio aired, titled "blonded Xmas".

== List of episodes ==
=== 2017 ===
| No. | Title | Original release date |
|---|---|---|
| 1 | "blonded 001" | February 24, 2017 |
This episode premieres Scottish musician Calvin Harris' single "Slide", featuring Ocean and American hip-hop group Migos. In two interludes, Ocean interviews American rapper Jay-Z about the state of radio and the music industry. Full track list: "Nights" – Frank Ocean; "Tunnel Vision" – Kodak Black; "I'm So Groovy" – Future; "Get Right Witcha" – Migos; "Slide" – Calvin Harris featuring Frank Ocean and Migos; "Bad Blood" – NAO; "Humble Mumble" – OutKast featuring Erykah Badu; "All by Myself" – Céline Dion; "Highways of My Life" – The Isley Brothers; "Adore" – Prince; "When You Were Mine" - Prince; "The Beautiful Ones" – Prince; "Song for Selim" – Miles Davis and Robert Glasper featuring KING; "Love Is Stronger Than Pride" – Sade; "Yo Chavez" – Yussef Kamaal; "Judas" – Esperanza Spalding; "I Got a Story to Tell" – The Notorious B.I.G.; "Back Up" – Ty Dolla Sign featuring 24hrs; "Overture" - Daft Punk; "Lost Worlds" - DJ Rashad featuring Traxman; "Pink + White" – Frank Ocean; "Alone in Kyoto" – Air; "Hey" – Pixies; "Cool Your Heart" – Dirty Projectors featuring Dawn Richard; "Heaven Is 10 Zillion Light Years Away" – Stevie Wonder; "I Can't Help It" – Michael Jackson; "Mr. Bojangles" – Nina Simone; "32 Levels" – Clams Casino featuring Lil B and Joe Newman; "Wild Things Run Free" – Teen Suicide; "Flim" – Aphex Twin; "Self Control" – Frank Ocean; "Glimmer" – Ola Pang
| 2 | "blonded 002" | March 10, 2017 |
Ocean premieres his single, "Chanel". As "Chanel" is repeatedly played during the end of the episode, an alternate verse from American rapper ASAP Rocky is occasionally aired. Full track list: "St. Martin de Porres" – Mary Lou Williams; "Mis" – Alex G; "Dark Red" – Steve Lacy; "Something for Your M.I.N.D." – Superorganism; "Get Started" – Young Fathers; "What Does Your Soul Look Like, Pt. 3" – DJ Shadow; "Dillatronic 09" – J Dilla; "Jethro" – Thundercat; "Faith In Strangers" – Andy Stott; "Templez of Light" – Vegyn; "There Are No Words" – Todd Rundgren; "Solo" – Frank Ocean; "Flu" – Jameszoo featuring Arthur Verocai; "Exhale (Shoop Shoop)" – Whitney Houston; "Superstar" – Usher; "Feds In Town" – UGK; "Rap" – Actress; "Ain't No Way" – Aretha Franklin; "Chanel" – Frank Ocean; "Chanel (Remix)" – Frank Ocean featuring A$AP Rocky
| 3 | "blonded 003" | April 8, 2017 |
The single "Biking" premieres, an Ocean song featuring frequent collaborators Jay-Z and Tyler, the Creator. Full track list: "Super Rich Kids" – Frank Ocean featuring Earl Sweatshirt; "What A Fool Believes" – The Doobie Brothers; "If Only You Knew" – Patti LaBelle; "Anytime" – Ray J; "Whip Appeal" – Babyface; "Don't Turn Me Away" – Rexy; "Dun Talkin'" – Kojo Funds featuring Abra Cadabra; "Let Me Know" – Maleek Berry; "Consideration" – Rihanna featuring SZA; "Heartthrob" – Father; "Swang" – Rae Sremmurd; "Don't Matter" – Isaiah Rashad; "Pull up Wit Ah Stick" – SahBabii featuring Loso Loaded; "Knocked Off" – Young Thug featuring Birdman; "Worth It" – Young Thug; "Undercover" – Kehlani; "Rush" – Starrah; "My World" – G Perico; "Trap by My Lonely" – Squidnice; "Glow" – Drake featuring Kanye West; "What More Can I Say" – NxWorries; "Camel" – Flying Lotus; "I Love Sloane" – Delroy Edwards; "Eh" – Death Grips; "Self Defense" – Arca; "Plastiphilia 2" – Dopplereffekt; "U Don't Survive" – Machinedrum; "Lyk U Use 2" – Moodymann featuring Andres; "Futura Free" – Frank Ocean; "Biking" – Frank Ocean featuring Jay Z and Tyler, The Creator
| 4 | "blonded 004" | April 23, 2017 |
Show hosts Roof Access and Vegyn end the episode by playing new Frank Ocean song "Lens" on loop for an hour, alternatively featuring a guest verse from American rapper Travis Scott. Full track list: "Confession" - Budgie; "Free" - Deniece Williams; "Mascara" - Jazmine Sullivan; "Magnolia" - Playboi Carti; "Up In Here" - Kodak Black; "Blkjuptr" - Smino; "Big Body" - ScHoolboy Q featuring Tha Dogg Pound; "From the D to the A" - Tee Grizzley featuring Lil Yachty; "XO Tour Llif3" - Lil Uzi Vert; "Dreams from the Hood" - Ezro; "LUST." - Kendrick Lamar; "T.P.O." - Dom Kennedy; "Meditation" - Babyfather featuring Arca; "I'm Freaky" - O'Bryan; "Olson" - Boards of Canada; "Falling" - Julee Cruise; "Fa So Lati Do" - Burna Boy; "Flossin'" - Mike Jones featuring Big Moe; "Lens" - Frank Ocean; "Lens (Remix)" - Frank Ocean featuring Travis Scott
| 5 | "blonded 005" | April 24, 2017 |
Just 24 hours after "blonded 004" aired, blonded Radio returns with "blonded 005", featuring a new remix of Ocean's Endless track "Slide On Me", featuring American rapper Young Thug. Full track list: "Lens" - Frank Ocean; "Frankie Teardrop" - Suicide; "Didn't I" - Darondo; "Right Down the Line" - Gerry Rafferty; "My Angel Rocks Back and Forth" - Four Tet; "Yekatit (February)" - Mulatu Astatke; "Some Children" - Holy Ghost!; "On the Beat" - B. B. & Q. Band; "Left Bank Two" - Wayne Hill; "Bahia Dreamin'" - Karriem Riggins; "Bound" - Ponderosa Twins Plus One; "Everything I Am" - Kanye West featuring DJ Premier; "Send It On" - D'Angelo; "Is That Enough" - Marvin Gaye; "Float On" - The Floaters; "Remind Me" - Patrice Rushen; "Pretty Sweet" - Frank Ocean; "Chicken Blows" - Guided by Voices; "Collective Dreamwish of Upperclass Elegance" - Grandaddy; "Place I Know/Kid Like You" - Arthur Russell; "You're Gonna Live Forever in Me" - John Mayer; "Would That Be an Adventure?" - Trust Fund; "Wait" - bare pale; "Get It Right" - Tashaki Miyaki; "Seigfried" - Frank Ocean; "Slide On Me (Remix)" - Frank Ocean featuring Young Thug; "La ritournelle" - Sebastien Tellier
| 6 | "blonded 006" | May 15, 2017 |
ASAP Mob's "RAF" is premiered, featuring a guest verse from Ocean, as is a solo version of "Biking". Full track list: "Come Down to Us" - Burial; "Rwm (run With Me)" - House of Pharaohs; "I'm Depressed" - Ka5sh featuring Yung Skkrt; "Lord Pretty Flacko Jodye 2 (LPFJ2)" - A$AP Rocky; "Biking (Solo)" - Frank Ocean; "Did You See" - J Hus; "Janet" - M. T. Hadley; "Dear Mama" - 2Pac; "Ms. Jackson" - OutKast; "Hello" - Erykah Badu; "Your Smile" - Rufus featuring Chaka Khan; "(At Your Best) You Are Love" - Frank Ocean; "Rocky Raccoon" - The Beatles; "Here, There and Everywhere" - The Beatles; "White Ferrari" - Frank Ocean; "Yoshimi Battles the Pink Robots, Pt. 1" - The Flaming Lips; "Italian National Anthem" - Andre Rieu; "Road to Nowhere" - Talking Heads; "GO (With Tirzah)" - Micachu; "Fones" - Mssingno; "Mirrors" - Dam-Funk; "You're Still the One" - Andres; "Whisper Fate" - Kuedo; "Hannibal" - Caribou; "american dream" - LCD Soundsystem; "Well and Spring" - Crying; "Rooting for My Baby" - Miley Cyrus; "This Could Be Beautiful (It Is)" - Metronomy; "Nikes" - Frank Ocean; "Kickin' Pimpin'" - Shawty Pimp featuring Reddog; "Ha" - Juvenile; "RAF" - A$AP Mob featuring A$AP Rocky, Playboi Carti, Quavo, Lil Uzi Vert and Frank Ocean; "Merry Christmas Mr. Lawrence" - Ryuichi Sakamoto
| 7 | "blonded 007" | August 27, 2017 |
Ocean celebrates the one year anniversary of Blonde and debuts new single, "Provider". Full track list: "Que Te Pedi" - La Lupe; "All We Do For Love" - Benny Sings; "Babyfather" - Sade; "Bein' Green" - Frank Sinatra; "Just Like a Baby" - Sly and the Family Stone; "I Can't Go for That (No Can Do)" - Daryl Hall & John Oates; "Only You" - Steve Monite; "Mercy Me" - Jay-Z; "Skyline To" - Frank Ocean; "Prom" - SZA; "Machinist" - Japanese Breakfast; "Sweet Nothings" - Robert Parker; "Anti" - SOB X RBE; "Cell Boomin" - Maxo Kream featuring Father; "Rolls Royce Bitch (Remix)" - 2 Chainz featuring Frank Ocean; "Thug Life" - 21 Savage; "Marsupial Superstars" - SahBabii featuring T3; "Mind Playing Tricks on Me" - Geto Boys; "Transportin'" - Kodak Black; "Bahamas" - A$AP Mob featuring A$AP Rocky, A$AP Ferg, A$AP Twelvyy, Lil Yachty, Key!, ScHoolboy Q and Smooky MarGielaa; "Only to Trip and Fall Down Again" - Katie Dey; "Scared" - Arthur; "Everything Is Embarrassing" - Sky Ferreira; "Blow" - Beyoncé; "Provider" - Frank Ocean

=== 2018 ===
| Title | Original release date |
|---|---|
| "blonded Midterms pt. 1" | November 6, 2018 |
The first in a three-part same-day special to commemorate the 2018 midterm elections. Aired in the morning. Full track list: “U-N-I-T-Y” - Frank Ocean; “OK” - MK. Gee; “Sweet Memory” - Arthur; “Who Makes Your Money” - Spoon; “Sketch for Summer” - The Durutti Column; “We Almost Lost Detroit” - Gil Scott-Heron and Brian Jackson; “Superstar” - Popcaan; “We Gonna Make It” - Jadakiss; “Womp Womp” - Valee; “Hockey” - Rico Nasty; “Issues” - Don Toliver; “Benzo” - Kish!; “eTHO” - Retro X; “Tira Tira” - La Goony Chonga featuring Black Kray; “FlatBed Freestyle” - Playboi Carti; “Black Effect” - The Carters; “Losin’ Weight” - Cam'ron; “Impeach the President” - The Honeydrippers
| "blonded Midterms pt. 2" | November 6, 2018 |
The second part of the special, aired at roughly 6pm local time. Full track list: "Window" - Noname; "Resolve" - Alfa Mist; "Red Light Drive" - HIRA; "Aah Dance" - Fine Quality featuring Cuz; "DD Form 214" - JPEGMafia; "Hookers" - Tierra Whack; "Never Bend" - 03 Greedo; "Dear Boy" - Paul and Linda McCartney; "Fell Asleep With A Vision" - The Spirit of the Beehive; "A Song" - Trust Fund; "The Leanover" - Life Without Buildings; "Ball" - Duvall Timothy; "Sycamore Girl" - Rex Orange County; "Kissing a Fool (2010 Remastered Version)" - George Michael
| "blonded Midterms pt. 3" | November 6, 2018 |
The final part of the special, airing at 9pm when most of the polls had closed. It was described by Ocean as "a luxury episode" on-air while the results were being announced. Full track list: "Saddic Gladdic" - Wagon Christ; "I Swear" - T.I.; "My Contribution to the Scam" - Jean Grae and Quelle Chris; "Out in the Streets" - Africa Hitech; "Last Great American Whale" - Lou Reed; "Effigy" - Creedence Clearwater Revival; "Hell" - James Brown; "This Land Is Your Land" - Sharon Jones & the Dap-Kings; "I Love Music" - Ahmad Jamal; "Comment (If Men Are Truly Brothers) [Remastered Mono Single Version]" - The Watts 103rd Street Rhythm Band; "Peace Piece" - Bill Evans; "FDT - YG featuring Nipsey Hussle
| "blonded Xmas" | December 25, 2018 |
A Christmas special of blonded Radio. Full track list: "Skating" - Vince Guaraldi; "O. Christmas" - Porridge Radio; "I Don't Intend To Spend Christmas Without You" - Margo Guryan; "Ave Maria" - Stevie Wonder; "This Christmas" - Donny Hathaway; "Jesus Christ" - Big Star; "Another Lonely Christmas" - Prince; "St. Brick Intro" - Gucci Mane; "Frosty the Snowman" - DJ Laz; "Tell Santa Dis" - Busy Signal; "Wonderful Christmastime (Edited Version)" - Paul McCartney; "Joy to the World" - Whitney Houston featuring the Georgia Mass Choir; "Christmas Wrapping" - The Waitresses; "I Wish" - Tha Dogg Pound; "Last Christmas (Single Version)" - Wham!; "Christmas (Baby Please Come Home)" - Darlene Love; "Still Crazy After All These Years" - Paul Simon

=== 2019 ===
| No. | Title | Original release date |
|---|---|---|
| 8 | "blonded 008" | October 19, 2019 |
Days after his first PrEP+ queer club night, Ocean premieres the track "DHL", along with select mixes from Justice and Sango. Full track list: "2001: A Space Odyssey" – John Williams and Boston Pops Orchestra; "1999" (Justice Remix) – Prince; "Safe and Sound" (Remix) – Justice; "Emperor Selassie I" – Congo Natty; "Fall Black" – DJ Spinn; "What I Say (Live)" – Miles Davis; "Connection" – The Rolling Stones; "The Clapping Song" – Shirley Ellis; "Ransom" – Lil Tecca; "Rap Shit" – City Girls; "1er Gaou" – Magic System; "Rock Steady" – Aretha Franklin; "Everything Flows" – Saint Etienne; "Moonlight Rendezvous" – The Other People Place; "It's Nice to be Alive" – Vegyn; "Sleepwalk" – MIKE; "Little Man" (Exemen Works) – Sia; "Battle" – Wookie featuring Lain; "Love Will Make Things Better" (12" Extended Version) – Todd Edwards Presents the Sample Choir; "Deep Inside" – Hardrive; "Dance My Pain Away" – Rod Lee; "Love Is Overtaking Me" – Arthur Russell; "Speed It Up" – Gunna; "Afropunk, Atlanta" – M.I.C (The Master of Inane Conversation); "Too Many Creeps" – Bush Tetras; "Grey Paper" – Jerry Paper; "Rom-Com Gone Wrong" – Matt Maltese; "You Make Me Feel (Mighty Real)" – Sylvester; "Int'l Players Anthem (I Choose You) (Sango Remix) – UGK featuring Outkast; "Cayendo" (Sango Remix) – Frank Ocean; "Nights" (Sango Remix) – Frank Ocean; "DHL" – Frank Ocean
| 9 | "blonded 009" | November 3, 2019 |
This episode follows the release of the track "In My Room" and features the Arca remix of "Little Demon" featuring Skepta, which was premiered during PrEP+. Full track list: "Yellow Magic (Tong Poo)" – Yellow Magic Orchestra; "Tinindo, Trincando" – Baby Consuelo; "I Don't Know" – Beastie Boys; "From a Whisper to a Scream" – Allen Toussaint; "Sophisticated Cissy" – The Meters; "Pelas Sombras" – Arthur Verocai; "Brain Food (Give Me)" – Burning Spear; "Estrela" – Lô Borges; "Bang! Bang!" – Joe Cuba Sextette; "Uno" – Ambjaay; "Your Love Is a Life Saver" – Gayle Adams; "Drifter" – Anthony Naples; "Gretel" – (Sandy) Alex G; "Needles In My Eyes" – The Beta Band; "1:04 PM" – Quadry; "The Word 2" – Shigeo Sekito; "I Can Only Bliss Out (F'Days)" – Laraaji; "Lord Help Me" – Donny Hathaway; "The Crystal Cat" – Dan Deacon; "Sex on the Beach" – DJ Assault; "Worst Ever Contender" – Rezzett; "Clouds" – Chaka Khan; "Phoneline" – Funkineven and Fatima; "The Steiners" – Westside Gunn featuring Elzhi; "Lucky Number" – Lene Lovich; "I'd Rather Go Blind" (live) – Etta James; "Little Demon" (Arca remix; live from PREP+) – Frank Ocean featuring Skepta; "In My Room – Frank Ocean
| 10 | "blonded 010" | November 9, 2019 |
Frank Ocean returns to Blonded Radio. No new music. Full track list: "Message from the Stars" - The RAH Band; "Fantazia" - Roy Blair; "Debold" - Vegyn; "Center of Gravity" - Yo La Tango; "A Pale" - Rosalía; "Chandelier" - Shoreline Mafia (featuring Curren$y); "Girl In Florida" - Kobe Jxdan; "Planet Caravan" - Black Sabbath; "EL TORO COMBO MEAL" - Earl Sweatshirt (featuring Mavi); "Em3" - Lord Apex; "Let the Beat Build" - Lil Wayne; "Something On Your Mind" - Karen Dalton; "Optimo" - Liquid Liquid; "Kerosene" - Big Black; "Moonshake" - Can; "Mind Your Own Business" - Delta 5; "Just My Imagination (Running Away With Me)" - The Temptations; "Glad To Be Unhappy" - Nels Cline; "Begin Again" - Andy Shauf; "Dear Landlord" - Fairport Convention; "Sorry Feeling Heart" - Garden Centre; "White Mice" - Mo-Dettes; "No Side to Fall In" - The Raincoats; "The Light" - Cate Le Bon; "North" - Clairo; "Heal" - Pentagon; "Fanfare for Naran Ratan" - Naran Ratan; "Very Special" - Duke Ellington; "Like Spinning Plates (Live)" - Radiohead; "Concentrate on Me" - Harold Melvin & the Blue Notes; "Clean Up Woman" - Betty Wright; "Don't Leave Me (Mono)" - Harry Nilsson
| – | "blonded Xmas" | December 24, 2019 |
A second Christmas episode of blonded Radio. Full track list: "Miss You Most (At Christmas Time)" - Mariah Carey; "Electricity" - Orchestral Manoeuvres in the Dark; "Deep Connections" - Octo Octa; "I Want the Money" - 645AR (featuring SenseiATL); "Island Letter" - Shuggie Otis; "Santa Baby" - The Christmas All-Stars and Joseph Simmons (featuring Salt-N-Pepa, Snoop Dogg, Onyx, P Diddy, Keith Murray, and Mase); "Christmas in the Ghetto" - TRU; "Athoth a Go!! Go!!" - Machine Girl; "Almeda" - Solange; "Follow the Light" - Dungeon Family; "Disco Spaceship" - Laurice; "My Sweet Lord (Demo)" - George Harrison; "Snow Is Falling In Manhattan" - Purple Mountains; "The Lonely Christmas Call" - George Jones and The Jones Boys; "Livin' Loose" - George Clanton; "Discourse" - Sleaford Mods; "U-Don't No" - RP Boo; "Home" - Headie One; "Torpeau Bleu" - Cortex; "Christmas Every Day" - The Miracles

=== 2021 ===
| Title | Original release date |
|---|---|
| "Blonded Xmas" | December 25, 2021 |
The Christmas special features an excerpt from Frank’s conversation with motivational speaker and extreme athlete Wim “Iceman” Hof, alongside a new and currently unreleased song.

=== 2022 ===
| Title | Original release date |
|---|---|
| "blonded Lucy in the Sky with Diamonds" | July 10, 2022 |
On LSD, with Dr. James Fadiman.
| "blonded ENERGY!" | July 10, 2022 |
On Qi Gong with Master Mingtong Gu.

== See also ==
- Blonde
- Beats 1
