= In My Room (Frank Ocean song) =

2019 single by Frank Ocean

Single by Frank Ocean
- B-side: "In My Room" (Benny Revival Remix)
- Released: November 2, 2019
- Length: 2:13
- Label: Blonded
- Songwriters: Frank Ocean; Michael Uzowuru
- Producers: Ocean; Uzowuru; Sango

Frank Ocean singles chronology
"DHL" (2019)	"In My Room" (2019)	"Dear April" / "Cayendo" (2020)

Lyric video
- "In My Room on YouTube

"In My Room" is a song by Frank Ocean, released as a single on November 2, 2019. Ocean wrote and produced the song alongside Michael Uzowuru. It was premiered on Ocean's Beats 1 radio show, Blonded Radio, two weeks after "DHL". The 7-inch single vinyl included the original mix of the song as well as a remix by Benny Revival as its B-side.

== Composition ==
The song features Ocean rapping and crooning over a looped synth line and a "simple" beat, with some drum programming done by Sango.

== Critical reception ==
Matthew Schnipper of Pitchfork compared the song to the music of rapper Lil B and called the first two-thirds of the song "nice, if close to throwaway."

== Charts ==
Chart (2019)	Peak position
Canada Hot 100 (Billboard)	70
Ireland (IRMA)	63
Lithuania (AGATA)	81
New Zealand Hot Singles (RMNZ)	6
UK Singles (Official Charts)	72
US Billboard Hot 100	85
US Hot R&B/Hip-Hop Songs (Billboard)	42
US Rolling Stone Top 100	32

== Certifications ==
Region	Certification	Certified units/sales
Denmark (IFPI Danmark)	Gold	45,000^{‡}
New Zealand (RMNZ)	Platinum	30,000^{‡}
United Kingdom (BPI)	Gold	400,000^{‡}
^{‡} Sales+streaming figures based on certification alone.
