= Chanel (Frank Ocean song) =

Single by Frank Ocean
- Released: March 10, 2017
- Genre: R&B
- Length: 3:30
- Label: Blonded
- Songwriters: Christopher Breaux; Jacob Ludwig Olofsson; Rami Dawood; Adam Feeney; Michael Uzowuru; Rakim Mayers (remix only)
- Producers: Frank Ocean; Jarami; Frank Dukes; Michael Uzowuru; Jeff Kleinman; Payton Maerz

Frank Ocean singles chronology
"Slide" (2017)	"Chanel" (2017)	"Biking" (2017)

Audio
- "Chanel" on YouTube

"Chanel" is a song by American singer-songwriter Frank Ocean, released as a standalone single on March 10, 2017. "Chanel" was premiered on the second episode of Ocean's Blonded Radio. A remix of the song featuring American rapper ASAP Rocky was also aired alongside the song's premiere.

== Background ==
On the morning of March 10, 2017, it was reported that Frank Ocean was set to release his second song of 2017. "Chanel" followed the release of Scottish producer Calvin Harris' "Slide" featuring Ocean and American hip-hop group Migos.

== Composition ==
"Chanel" is a slow piano ballad with Ocean rapping his verses and crooning the hook "I see both sides like Chanel/See on both sides like Chanel." Ocean uses the symbolism of duality to discuss sexual fluidity and masculinity. In the remix, ASAP Rocky raps about ex-girlfriend Chanel Iman.

== Reception ==
Immediately upon its release, "Chanel" was praised for its lyrics about sexual fluidity and challenging heteronormative notions of masculinity. Austin Williams of The Undefeated described the song as "the coldest, gayest, and most securely masculine flex in the history of rap." LGBT fans on Twitter called "Chanel" a bisexual anthem. Pitchfork named the song as "Best New Track", and in 2019 included it on their list of "The 200 Best Songs of the 2010s" at number 180.

On March 15, 2017, French luxury brand Chanel released two ads with the captions "We see both sides like Frank Ocean", flipping the lyrics of the song. A Chanel spokesperson told The Fader through email that, "This is simply our way of acknowledging his nod to Chanel in his latest single."

== Charts ==
Chart (2017)	Peak position
Canada Hot 100 (Billboard)	65
New Zealand Heatseekers (RMNZ)	2
UK Singles (Official Charts)	80
UK R&B (Official Charts Company)	16
US Billboard Hot 100	72
US Hot R&B/Hip-Hop Songs (Billboard)	30

== Certifications ==
Region	Certification	Certified units/sales
Denmark (IFPI Danmark)	Gold	45,000^{‡}
New Zealand (RMNZ)	3× Platinum	90,000^{‡}
United Kingdom (BPI)	Gold	400,000^{‡}
United States (RIAA)	Platinum	1,000,000^{‡}
^{‡} Sales+streaming figures based on certification alone.

== Release history ==
Country	Date	Format	Label	Ref.
Worldwide	10 March 2017	Digital download	Blonded	
