= Inc. No World =

American music duo

- Also known as: Teen Inc. (2010–2011); Inc. (2011–2016)
- Origin: Los Angeles, California, U.S.
- Genres: Downtempo; electronic; alternative R&B; soul
- Instruments: Bass; guitar; keyboards; vocals; synthesizer; Synth Guitar
- Years active: 2010–present
- Labels: No World; 4AD
- Members: Daniel Aged; Andrew Aged
- Website: inc-no-world.com

Inc. No World (stylized as inc. no world; formerly inc. and Teen Inc.) is an American music duo originally from Los Angeles formed by brothers Andrew and Daniel Aged. Their first full-length album, No World, was released on 19 February 2013.

== Musical career ==
inc. no world was formed as Teen Inc. around 2010 by brothers Andrew and Daniel Aged after a series of tours and session work with various artists. They produced, mixed, and self-released their first single, Fountains in 2010 along with the b-side "Friends of the Night".

They later released an EP titled 3 in 2011 under the name "Inc."

Their debut album, No World, was released under 4AD in February 2013. Two singles were released from the album: "The Place", which was featured in the Grand Theft Auto V soundtrack, and "5 Days".

In February 2014, they released a collaboration single with English singer-songwriter, FKA twigs, titled "FKA x inc.". They also produced the song "One Time" for her debut album, LP1, released in August 2014. On 1 December 2014 they posted an unreleased demo from 2011 titled "Our Time" to their official YouTube account, along with the announcement that they would be releasing new music in 2015.

On 17 February 2015, the single "A Teardrop from Below" was released. A year later, On 6 May 2016, they released a new song titled "The Wheel". On 14 July 2016 they announced that they were finished recording their second studio album which will be released shortly through their own label, No World Recordings. On 25 July 2016, they announced that their second studio album, As Light As Light, will be released on 9 September 2016.

== Members ==
- Andrew Aged – vocals, guitars, production
- Daniel Aged – bass, production, keyboards, pedal steel guitar

== Discography ==
=== Albums ===
Title	Album details	Ref.
No World	Release: 13 February 2013; Label: 4AD; Format: Digital download, CD, LP	
As Light As Light	Release: 9 September 2016; Label: No World Recordings; Format: Digital download, CD, LP	

=== Extended plays ===
Title	Album details	Ref.
3	Release: 25 July 2011; Label: 4AD; Format: Digital download, LP	
Living	Release: 18 August 2017; Label: Quality Time; Format: Digital download, CD, LP	

=== Singles ===
- "Fountains / Friend of the Night" (2010)
- "Eiffel Tower" / "The Things That I Would Do" (with Francis and the Lights) (2011)
- "The Place" (2012)
- "5 Days" (2012)
- "FKA x inc." (2014)
- "A Teardrop from Below" (2015)
- "The Wheel" (2016)

== Music videos ==
List of music videos, showing year released and director
Title	Year	Director(s)	Ref.
"The Place"	2012	Daniel Aged, Andrew Aged, and Daniel Oh	
"Black Wings"	2013	Daniel Aged, Andrew Aged, and Ryan Kuhlman	
"Angel"	2013	Daniel Aged, Andrew Aged, and Ryan Kuhlman	
"FKA x inc."	2014	Nick Walker and FKA Twigs	
