= Malay (music producer) =

American record producer

- Born: James Ryan Ho
- Genres: R&B; soul; electro; alternative hip hop; hip hop soul; alternative R&B; neo soul; EDM; pop
- Occupations: Record producer; songwriter; engineer
- Instruments: Guitar; bass; keyboards; percussion; trumpet
- Years active: 1998–present
- Label: Bhamboo LLC

James Ryan Ho, known professionally as Malay, is an American record producer, songwriter, and audio engineer. He won Best Urban Contemporary Album at the 55th Annual Grammy Awards for his work on Frank Ocean's Channel Orange (2012).

== Early life and career ==
His father is Malaysian. Malay grew up in Bellingham, Washington where he was introduced to classic rock at an early age by his father. Both Jimi Hendrix and Pink Floyd sparked his interest in music. While he wrestled in school and showed great potential, he eventually quit the sport to pursue his career in music.

He began to teach himself guitar and piano while making money with a local band in Bellingham. During this period he would go on to build a recording studio in his home. He adopted the producer name 'Maylay' during the 1990s, derived from his best friend's native language's word for 'mountain'. Its spelling may have been changed to avoid confusion with another musical artist, Young Maylay, with whom he bears no relation.

In the mid-2000s, his skills were noticed and Jake One, a hip-hop producer who recruited him to help with the productions on releases for G-Unit. After working closely with Jake One, Malay moved to New York City where he got a job producing for MTV's Making the Band. Afterwards, Malay moved once more to Atlanta before ultimately settling in Los Angeles in 2010.

Malay has produced for a number of artists. He was producer for John Legend's album Evolver (2008), and Frank Ocean's channel ORANGE (2012); the latter won a number of accolades, including the Grammy Award for Best Urban Contemporary Album, as well as 2013 Grammy Award nominations for Album of the Year, Best New Artist, and Record of the Year for "Thinkin Bout You". He also co-produced Zayn's debut album Mind of Mine (2016).

Malay co-founded Britannia Row Recordings in 2016, in partnership with BMG. In 2018, the label signed The Parlor Mob, a rock band based in New Jersey.

== Discography ==
Album	Song(s)	Artist	Year	Credits
Konnakol (album)	"Nusrat"; "Betting Folk"; "Used to the Blues"; "5th Element"; "Prayers"; "Fatal"; "Take Turns"; "Blooming"; "Like I Have You"; "Loving the Way I Do"; "Breathe"	Zayn	2026	Producer, writer
Hades	"Uncanny Valley"	Melanie Martinez	2026	Producer, Writer, Engineer
Girl Of My Dreams	"Guess We Lied..."; "Serial Heartbreaker'; "I Love You, Bitch"; "Healing"	FLETCHER	2022	Producer, writer
Solar Power	"The Path"; The Man with the Axe"; "Leader of a New Regime"; "Hold No Grudge"	Lorde	2021	Producer, writer
Three. Two. One.	Much Too Much; Fear of Being Alone; Pretty Boy; Bend Over Backwards	Lennon Stella	2021	Producer, writer
The S(ex) Tapes	Silence; If I Hated You; The One; Shh...Don't Say It	FLETCHER	2020	Producer, writer
You Ruined New York City for Me	"If You're Gonna Lie"; "Undrunk"; "All Love"; "About You"	FLETCHER	2019	Producer, writer
Moonlight	"Bridges"; "Lost In Translation"; "Say What You Will"	Johnnyswim	2019	Producer, writer
Icarus Falls	"Stand Still"; "Sour Diesel"; "Satisfaction"; "Scripted"	Zayn	2018	Producer, writer
Village	"Slow Up"	Jacob Banks	2018	Producer, Writer, Engineer, Instrumentation
Saturn	"Orbit"	NAO	2018	Writer
So Sad So Sexy	"Deep End"; "Two Nights" (ft. Amine); "Jaguars in the Air"; "Sex Money Feelings Die"; "So Sad So Sexy"; "Bad Woman"; "Utopia"	Lykke Li	2018	Producer, Writer
The Thrill of It All	"Say It First"; "Midnight Train"	Sam Smith	2018	Producer, Writer, Instrumentation
—N/a	"Rush"	Lewis Capaldi	2018	Producer, Writer
Divinely Uninspired to a Hellish Extent	"Fade"	Lewis Capaldi	2017	Producer, Writer
Good for You	"Turf"; "Dakota" (featuring Charlie Wilson)	Aminé	2017	Producer, Writer
Melodrama	"Sober"; "The Louvre"; "Supercut"	Lorde	2017	Producer
Blonde	"Nikes"; "Skyline To"; "Ivy"; "Self Control" (featuring Austin Feinstein & Yung Lean); "Pretty Sweet"; "Seigfried"; "Godspeed" (featuring Kim Burrell & Yung Lean); "Futura Free/Interviews"	Frank Ocean	2016	Producer, Writer, Engineer, Instrumentation
The Get Down (Original Soundtrack from the Netflix Original Series)	"Cadillac ft. Miguel"; "Losing Your Mind ft. Raury & Jaden Smith; "You Can't Hide ft. Zayn / Teddy Pendergrass & Grandmaster Flash; "Shaolin's Theme / Pray" ft. Malay / 6lack	Various	2016	Producer, Writer, Engineer, Instrumentation
The Heart Speaks in Whispers	"In the Dark"	Corinne Bailey Rae	2016	Writer
Mind of Mine	"iT's YoU"; "BeFour"; "Intermission: Flower"; "Rear View"; "Borderz"; "BLUE"; "BRIGHT"; "Do Something Good"	Zayn	2016	Producer, Writer
Know-It-All	"Wild Things"; "Stone" (ft. Sebastian Kole)	Alessia Cara	2015	Producer, Writer
All We Need	"All We Need" ft. Adia; "Revolution"; "Forbidden Knowledge" ft. Big K.R.I.T.; "Woodcrest Manor II"; "CPU" ft. RZA; "Love Is Not a Four Letter Word"; "Trap Tears" ft. Key!; "Friends" ft. Tom Morello	Raury	2015	Producer, Writer
BEcoming	"My Suicide Note"; "Sleep to Dream"; "Eyes Wide Shut"; "Here I Am"; "Hey You There"; "Walk On Water"; "Born to Belong"; "War IV Love"; "Hey You There"	Stacy Barthe	2015	Executive Producer, Producer, Writer, Engineer, Instrumentation
Higher Than Here	"Heaven To A Fool"	James Morrison	2015	Producer, Writer, Instrumentation
Thirty One	"Sure Love"	Jarryd James	2015	Producer
Unbreakable Smile	"Talk"	Tori Kelly	2015	Producer, Writer, Engineer, Instrumentation
Radius	"Perfect World"	Allen Stone	2015	Producer, Writer, Engineer, Instrumentation
Love Story	"Change"; "American You"; "Empty Bottles"; "Have a Great Flight"; "Disappear"	Yelawolf	2015	Producer, Writer, Engineer, Instrumentation
Category 5	"Home"; "Crystal Ball"; "Valentine"; "City of Sin"; "Cool Trip"; "Miracle"; "Falling Apart"; "Give it Away"; "Sister"; "Where O Where"; "Feet Don't Fly"; "Leaving on a Train"; "Fun in the Sun"	Linus Young	2014	Executive Producer, Producer, Writer, Engineer, Instrumentation
Nikki Nack		Tune-Yards	2014	Producer
All I Wanna Do	"Riverside Girl"	T. Mills	2014	Producer
City of Sin (Single)	"City of Sin"	Linus Young	2014	Producer, Writer, Instrumentation
Dirty Gold	"Angel & Airwaves"; "April's Fool"; "Vinyl"	Angel Haze	2013	Producer, Writer, Instrumentation
Love in the Future	"You & I (Nobody in the World)"	John Legend	2013	Producer, Writer, Instrumentation
Paradise Valley	"Wildfire ft. Frank Ocean"	John Mayer	2013	Writer, Instrumentation
Age Against the Machine	"Kolors"	Goodie Mob	2013	Producer, Writer, Instrumentation
Girl on Fire	"One Thing"	Alicia Keys	2012	Producer, Writer, Instrumentation
channel ORANGE	"Start"; "Sierra Leone"; "Sweet Life"; "Super Rich Kids" (featuring. Earl Sweatshirt); "Pilot Jones"; "Crack Rock"; "Pyramids"; "Lost"; "Monks"; "Bad Religion"; "Pink Matter" (featuring. André 3000); "Forrest Gump"; "End/Golden Girl" (featuring. Tyler, the Creator)	Frank Ocean	2012	Producer, Writer, Engineer, Instrumentation
Play It by Heart	"Heads Vs Hearts (ft. Booker T. Jones); "Oh There She Goes"	Jay James Picton	2012	Producer, Writer, Engineer, Instrumentation
Break of Dawn	"Undertow"; "Break of Dawn; "Money"	Goapele	2011	Producer, Writer
Best Night Of My Life	"Fifteen Miinutes"	Jamie Foxx	2010	Producer, Writer
Kandi Koated	"The More I Try"; "Lucky"; "Haven't Loved Right"	Kandi	2010	Producer, Writer
Trunk Muzik 0-60	"Get the Fuck Up"; "I Wish" (ft. Raekwon)	Yelawolf	2010	Producer, Writer
Back to Me	"Thrill Is Gone" (ft. Cee-Lo); "Move On Me"; "Teach Me"	Fantasia	2010	Producer, Writer
Sir Luscious Left Foot: The Son of Chico Dusty	"Feel Me"; "Sumthin's Gotta Give" (ft. Mary J. Blige)	Big Boi	2010	Producer, Writer
D.N.A.	"I Miss My Friend"	Mario	2009	Producer, Writer
Evolver	"Cross the Line"; "Satisfaction"; "I Love, You Love"; "*Green Light" (ft. Andre 3000); "Everybody Knows"; "It's Over" (ft. Kanye West)	John Legend	2008	Producer, Writer
I Pledge Allegiance to the Grind II	"Good-Bye (City of Dope)"	Killer Mike	2008	Producer, Writer
Just a Rolling Stone	"Beautiful Escape"	Donnie Klang	2008	Producer, Writer
Day26	"I'm the Reason"; "If It Wasn't For You"	Day26	2008	Producer, Writer
Welcome to the Dollhouse	"Poetry"	Danity Kane	2008	Producer, Writer
Fast Lane	"Be Easy" (ft. Mary J. Blige)	Hot Rod	2006	Co-Produced with Jake One
Get Rich or Die Tryin' OST	"I Don't Know Officer"	50 Cent, Lloyd Banks, Prodigy, Spider Loc, Mase	2005	Additional Keys
