= Super Rich Kids =

2013 single by Frank Ocean featuring Earl Sweatshirt

Single by Frank Ocean featuring Earl Sweatshirt

from the album Channel Orange
- Released: March 11, 2013
- Recorded: 2012
- Genre: R&B; neo soul; alternative hip hop
- Length: 5:05
- Songwriters: Christopher Breaux; Thebe Kgositsile; James Ho; Kirk Robinson; Nathaniel Robinson Jr.; Roy Hammond; Mark Morales; Mark Rooney
- Producers: Malay; Frank Ocean; Om’Mas Keith

Frank Ocean singles chronology
"Lost" (2012)	"Super Rich Kids" (2013)	"Nikes" (2016)

Earl Sweatshirt singles chronology
"Chum" (2012)	"Super Rich Kids" (2013)	"Whoa" (2013)

"Super Rich Kids" is a song by American singer and rapper Frank Ocean featuring fellow American rapper Earl Sweatshirt. It was released as the fifth single from Ocean's debut studio album Channel Orange on March 11, 2013. It was first performed live by Ocean in 2011 and then on his Channel Orange Tour in 2012. The song is in the style of R&B and neo soul, and includes references to and samples of the songs "Bennie and the Jets" by Elton John, "Got to Give It Up" by Marvin Gaye, and "Real Love" by Mary J. Blige. It addresses young, wealthy characters' ennui and fears of the financial crisis with dry humor. The song received positive reviews and charted on the Billboard R&B Songs chart and the UK Singles Chart and R&B chart. The song also appeared on the TV show Gossip Girl and in the film The Bling Ring.

== Background ==
"Super Rich Kids" was written by Frank Ocean, Malay, Earl Sweatshirt, Kirk Robinson, Nathaniel Robinson Jr., Roy Hammond, Mark Morales and Mark Rooney and produced primarily by Malay. Ocean and Malay came up with "Super Rich Kids" on their first day working together on Ocean's debut album, Channel Orange. According to Ocean, the 2000 film Traffic was an inspiration for the song. Ocean first performed the song during his debut solo tour in 2011, and later performed it on the Channel Orange Tour. The single release was originally announced on January 23, 2013. It was released in the United Kingdom on March 11, and in the United States on the 17th.

== Composition ==
=== Music ===
"Super Rich Kids" is an R&B and neo soul ballad set in common time and a slow half-time groove tempo of 60 beats per minute. The key the song was composed in is E♭ major, with a chord progression of E♭maj9−A♭13sus4−D♭maj9−B♭9sus4−B♭7#5b9 followed throughout the song. The song includes a piano part that references the thumping piano line of Elton John's 1973 song "Bennie and the Jets", and horns and synth arpeggios are also present. According to The Quietus, "a stomping piano and the steady smack of kickdrum anchors the ghostly crowd noise from a vast débutantes ball, as the synths quiver both nauseously and as subtly as candle-smoke in a floor draft."

=== Lyrics ===
"Super Rich Kids" addresses young, wealthy/rich characters' ennui and fears of the financial crisis with dry humor. The song's chorus takes its lyrics and melody from Mary J. Blige's "Real Love". The track includes a verse from Earl Sweatshirt, which, according to Complex, is a reminder of Ocean as "OFWGKTA at the end of the day." Paste magazine said that "Earl's low verses push Ocean way up into his vocal range."

According to Sound and Motion magazine, the track

"is exactly as the title suggests; Frank’s view on the children of parents who have inherited massive trust funds without the grasp of what a huge responsibility it is and the good they could do. From expensive cars to a different woman every night, the alleged social elite stumble through a charmed existence where the real world is buffered from them and then they breed a new generation with the same attitude. The track also contains brief glimpses into what he perceives as an alternative view of loneliness and isolation where all the super rich want is a love that’s not about money or anything material."

"Super Rich Kids" is described by Muso's Guide as "a contemporary version of a Jay McInerney novel," and by The Independent as "something Carole King knocked out in the 1970s." HipHopDX.com said that "at no point are the lyrics judgemental. If anything they’re compassionate." The song also takes samples from Marvin Gaye's "Got to Give It Up", and a reference to the 1970s sitcom Good Times (the "Dy-no-mite!" catchphrase of Jimmie Walker's character J.J. Evans).

== Critical reception ==
The single received acclaim from critics. Sound and Motion magazine said that it "could easily be listened to repeatedly or just set on in the background for an evening's entertainment." Muso's Guide said the song "could be viewed as one of those tail end singles from a brilliant album that doesn't stand strong on its own (Can anyone remember 'Until The End of Time' from FutureSex/LoveSounds or 'Broken-Hearted Girl' from I Am... Sasha Fierce?). Ocean, proving his talent as a songwriter, and a jaded voice for this frustrated introspective generation is able to find something profound from a superficial world." The song became an Editor's Pick on DJBooth.net.

Critical reactions of the song in reviews of Channel Orange were also positive. Time called the track a "stand out, tying together the album’s two themes of class and love." Billboard, in a track-by-track review, said that "the steadiness of the beat is immediately familiar but wholly fresh – it's like Ocean snatched 'Benny and the Jets' and threw the composition down a trap door into another universe." No Ripcord said that "it's so incongruous against the crass commercialism and consuming greed that pervades so much of popular culture that it's astonishing."

Complex listed Earl Sweatshirt's appearance in the song number 15 on their "25 Best Guest Verses of 2012".

== In other media ==
In 2012, the song appeared on the Gossip Girl season 6 episode "Monstrous Ball", along with four other Frank Ocean tracks: "Lost", "Pyramids", "Sweet Life" and "Thinkin Bout You". The song also appears as the seventeenth track on the soundtrack for the film The Bling Ring and on the HBO miniseries Big Little Lies. The song was also covered by Misha B.

== Lawsuit ==
In 2014, record label TufAmerica filled a copyright lawsuit against Vivendi and Universal Music Group for the sampling of Mary J. Blige's "Real Love" in "Super Rich Kids". This was because, according to the lawsuit, the sample included a sample of the Honey Drippers song "Impeach the President".

== Charts ==
=== Weekly charts ===
Chart (2013)	Peak position
UK Singles (Official Charts Company)	145
UK R&B (Official Charts Company)	20
US R&B Songs (Billboard)	23
US Bubbling Under R&B/Hip-Hop Singles (Billboard)	4

== Certifications ==
Region	Certification	Certified units/sales
Australia (ARIA)	2× Platinum	140,000^{‡}
Denmark (IFPI Danmark)	Gold	45,000^{‡}
New Zealand (RMNZ)	2× Platinum	60,000^{‡}
United Kingdom (BPI)	Gold	400,000^{‡}
United States (RIAA)	Gold	500,000^{‡}
^{‡} Sales+streaming figures based on certification alone.
