= Lost (Frank Ocean song) =

2012 single by Frank Ocean

Single by Frank Ocean

from the album Channel Orange
- Released: December 17, 2012
- Recorded: 2012
- Genre: Pop rock; R&B; funk
- Length: 3:54
- Label: Def Jam
- Songwriters: Christopher Breaux; James Ho; Micah Otano; Paul Shelton
- Producer: Malay • Frank Ocean • Om’Mas Keith

Frank Ocean singles chronology
"Sweet Life" (2012)	"Lost" (2012)	"Super Rich Kids" (2013)

"Lost" is a song by American singer-songwriter Frank Ocean. It was released as the fourth single from his debut studio album Channel Orange (2012). The song was written by Ocean, Micah Otano, Paul “Phamous” Shelton, and Malay; with production primarily handled by the latter.

The single has also been covered by American record production trio Major Lazer on their 2015 album Peace is the Mission: Extended, featuring vocals from Danish singer MØ, along with English electro band Swiss Lips as well as covered by English singer-songwriter Jorja Smith.

== Composition ==
"Lost" is a pop rock and R&B song set in common time at a straight-up pop rock tempo of 123 beats per minute. The song is in a G minor, with a chord progression of Gm−B♭maj7−E♭−B♭maj7 followed throughout, and Ocean's vocal spans from C_{4} to G_{5}. According to The Quietus, "A bouncy indie-rock rhythm and chicken-scratch guitar propels a buoyant Frank, as he takes to the road in the hope of getting well and truly lost in sunny California. Flowing atop a narcotic bass melody and a trio of harmonising vocalists, the choruses eventually pan back for a coda of whistling synths and ELO-esque keys." The lyrical content of "Lost" describes the protagonist's relationship with a cocaine-cooking girlfriend. The song contains samples from the film Fear and Loathing in Las Vegas (1998), a fragmented film centered on drug experimentation. Frank Ocean, Micah Otanom and Malay construct a fictional story of Ocean reflecting on his love, addiction, and greed. His love interest, a woman who once had different ambitions, becomes absorbed in a lifestyle of material and high thrill through him which is alluded to by his repeated use of the phrase “triple weight” referring to both a magnitude of his love for her as well as the triple beam balance he uses to measure drugs. The repeating chorus illustrates that the couple are getting further consumed by their high risk lifestyle and the pleasure of traveling around the world are not fulfilling as there is an ever present sense of feeling lost. Ocean eventually reaches a point of regret for getting her involved in his activities yet his own addiction and chase forces him to make false promises to her and himself:

She’s at a stove (who)

Can’t believe I got her out here cooking dope (cooking dope)

I promise she’ll be whipping meals up for a family of her own someday

Nothing wrong (nothing wrong)

No, nothing wrong (aint nothing wrong) with a lie (ohh)

Nothing wrong (nothing wrong) with another short plane ride (aint nothing wrong)

Through the sky (up in the sky)

You and I (Just you and I)

He recognizes that his girlfriend is now distant from the person she once was as she has so easily adapted to a life of drugs. He's regretful in the role he's played, so he promises that she will one day have an ordinary life; However, the following lines suggest that he'll be unable to fulfill his promises. His use of “nothing wrong” draws a parallel to the lies that frequently result of justifying addiction. He closes out the verse with him and his girlfriend taking another short plane ride which suggests that he and his girlfriend will be continuing to sell and take drugs, delaying and potentially never delivering his promises to return his girlfriend to a normal life.

== Reception ==
"Lost" received high praise and acclaim among critics, complimenting Ocean's idiosyncratic style and pop sensibilities as well as Malay, the album's prominent producer. It is often referred to as a highlight on his debut studio album Channel Orange and is his most straightforward "pop" song.

"Lost" debuted at number 91 on the Australian Singles Chart on the chart issue dated for the week of October 17, 2012 and peaked at number 46. The song also peaked at numbers 38, 53, and 9 on the Danish Singles Chart, UK Singles Chart and UK R&B Chart respectively.

"Lost" achieved its greatest level of success in New Zealand. The song debuted on the New Zealand Singles Chart at number 32, peaking at number 5 three weeks later and becoming Ocean's first top-ten single. The song was eventually certified gold and subsequently platinum by the Recording Industry Association of New Zealand (RIANZ) in its fifth and ninth week on the chart, respectively.

In early 2022, the song gained a viral resurgence from the social media platform TikTok. The song was used in over 176,000 videos from the app.

== Charts ==
=== Weekly charts ===
Initial weekly chart performance for "Lost"
Chart (2012–2013)	Peak position
Australia (ARIA)	46
Belgium (Ultratip Bubbling Under Flanders)	13
Belgium Urban (Ultratop Flanders)	25
Denmark (Tracklisten)	14
Germany (GfK)	85
New Zealand (Recorded Music NZ)	5
Slovakia Airplay (ČNS IFPI)	41
South Korea (Gaon International Chart)	59
UK Singles (Official Charts)	53
UK R&B (Official Charts Company)	9
US R&B Songs (Billboard)	25

2020 weekly chart performance for "Lost"
Chart (2020)	Peak position
Sweden Heatseeker (Sverigetopplistan)	19

2022 weekly chart performance for "Lost"
Chart (2022)	Peak position
Australia (ARIA)	16
Austria (Ö3 Austria Top 40)	43
Canada Hot 100 (Billboard)	22
Germany (GfK)	69
Global 200 (Billboard)	43
Greece (IFPI)	65
Iceland (Tónlistinn)	21
Ireland (IRMA)	24
Lithuania (AGATA)	43
Netherlands (Single Top 100)	53
Norway (VG-lista)	36
Portugal (AFP)	133
South Africa Streaming (TOSAC)	70
Sweden (Sverigetopplistan)	80
Switzerland (Schweizer Hitparade)	51
UK Singles (Official Charts)	44
UK Hip Hop/R&B (Official Charts)	7
US Hot 100 Recurrents (Billboard)	10
US Hot R&B/Hip-Hop Songs (Billboard)	16

2025 weekly chart performance for "Lost"
Chart (2025)	Peak position
North Macedonia Airplay (Radiomonitor)	10

=== Year-end charts ===
2013 year-end chart performance for "Lost"
Chart (2013)	Position
Denmark Streaming (Tracklisten)	36
New Zealand (Recorded Music NZ)	29

2022 year-end chart performance for "Lost"
Chart (2022)	Position
Australia (ARIA)	40
Canada (Canadian Hot 100)	88
Denmark (Tracklisten)	78
New Zealand (Recorded Music NZ)	30
UK Singles (OCC)	96

2023 year-end chart performance for "Lost"
Chart (2023)	Position
Australia (ARIA)	90
New Zealand (Recorded Music NZ)	41

== Certifications ==
Certifications and sales for "Lost"
Region	Certification	Certified units/sales
Australia (ARIA)	8× Platinum	560,000^{‡}
Brazil (Pro-Música Brasil)	Gold	30,000^{‡}
Denmark (IFPI Danmark)	5× Platinum	450,000^{‡}
Germany (BVMI)	Platinum	300,000^{‡}
Italy (FIMI)	Gold	50,000^{‡}
New Zealand (RMNZ)	10× Platinum	300,000^{‡}
Portugal (AFP)	Gold	10,000^{‡}
Spain (Promusicae)	Gold	30,000^{‡}
United Kingdom (BPI)	3× Platinum	1,800,000^{‡}
United States (RIAA)	3× Platinum	3,000,000^{‡}
Streaming
Denmark (IFPI Danmark)	2× Platinum	3,600,000^{†}
^{‡} Sales+streaming figures based on certification alone.^{†} Streaming-only figures based on certification alone.

== Release history ==
Release dates for "Lost"
Country	Date	Format	Label
United Kingdom	December 17, 2012	Contemporary hit radio	Def Jam
Germany	March 22, 2013	Digital download	Def Jam

== Major Lazer version ==
"Lost"

Single by Major Lazer featuring MØ

from the album Peace Is the Mission: Extended
- Released: July 20, 2015
- Recorded: 2015
- Genre: Reggae
- Length: 3:15
- Label: Mad Decent
- Songwriter: Frank Ocean
- Producer: Major Lazer

Major Lazer singles chronology
"Powerful" (2015)	"Lost" (2015)	"Light It Up (Remix)" (2015)

MØ singles chronology
"Lean On" (2015)	"Lost" (2015)	"Kamikaze" (2015)

Audio video
- "Lost" on YouTube

"Lost" is a song recorded by Major Lazer, featuring guest vocals from Danish singer MØ. She had previously worked with Major Lazer on "All My Love" and worldwide hit "Lean On" for Major Lazer's fourth studio album, Peace Is the Mission. It was released to Major Lazer's SoundCloud on July 20, 2015, where it currently has over one million plays, and was promoted extensively on Twitter. It serves as a cover or remake of Frank Ocean's 2012 Channel Orange single, "Lost", and features reggae-style grooves, an up-beat tempo, electronic percussion and meta-Rastafarian synths. The lyrics remain unchanged from the original version of the song. A static video of the single's cover was uploaded to Major Lazer's YouTube channel on July 23, 2015.

=== Background ===
The song's release was originally hinted in May 2015 with the release of a 10-second preview snippet on Twitter. The song at that point was unfinished and the album and release date were still to be confirmed.

Following the eager anticipation of Ocean's new album, Boys Don't Cry (later retitled Blonde), Major Lazer initially wanted to demonstrate their production credentials and hint the release of Ocean's album, which was expected to be released on July 20. It was also used to promote their latest studio album, Peace is the Mission, which was released on June 1, 2015.

MØ had previously collaborated with Major Lazer for the lead single in the album "Lean On", which ended up becoming a worldwide hit, reaching the top 10 in the US and topping the Billboard Dance/Electronic Songs chart. She also worked on "All My Love" as a writer along with Lorde and Ariana Grande for The Hunger Games: Mockingjay – Part 1 soundtrack in 2014. This prompted Major Lazer to once again collaborate with her on a new single, and they chose Frank Ocean's "Lost" due to personal preferences. Another single, featuring Belgian singer Selah Sue was also worked on and was rumored to appear on Major Lazer's next studio album.

The cover art for the song features a cartoon depiction of a circular enclosed maze, at the centre of which is a peace sign, referencing the song's title and Major Lazer's latest album.

=== Reception ===
The song was well received by music critics, however reviews from Frank Ocean fanatics generally favored the original version, and many claimed that the single isn't at the "same level of the majorly infectious 'Lean On'". Lindsey Lanquist of The Edge Magazine gave a positive review of the song and stated that "the resulting cover is surprisingly great. Though we would expect MØ and Major Lazer’s electronic influences to sound jarring when paired with Ocean’s rap and R&B roots, 'Lost' is upbeat enough for it to work. The artists have essentially reimagined the song, turning it into something new and wonderful." MØ's vocals were also praised by critics, with Matthew Meadow of YourEDM claiming that "for what it’s worth, MØ’s rendition of Frank’s vocals are oozing with sweet seduction; she absolutely nails it."

The song was also named as one of "the 5 biggest songs" for the week of (July 24, 2015) by Capital Xtra.

=== Live performances ===
MØ performed the song live at the Sziget Festival on August 13, 2015, without a backing track. She later performed the song at the GrapeFestival on August 15, 2015. On June 4, 2016, the song was issued for a live performance at the Orange Warsaw Festival.
