= Channel Orange =

Studio album by Frank Ocean
- Released: July 10, 2012
- Recorded: 2011–2012
- Studios: EastWest (Hollywood); Henson (Hollywood); Record Plant (Hollywood); Manhattan Sound Recording (New York); San Ysidro (Beverly Hills); Studio for the Talented and Gifted (Los Angeles); Westlake (Los Angeles)
- Genres: Alternative R&B; progressive soul; neo soul
- Length: 55:49
- Label: Def Jam
- Producers: Frank Ocean; Jonathan Ikpeazu; Malay; Om'Mas Keith; Pharrell Williams; Shea Taylor; Tyler, the Creator

Frank Ocean chronology
Nostalgia, Ultra (2011)	Channel Orange (2012)	Endless (2016)

Singles from Channel Orange
- 1. "Thinkin Bout You" Released: April 17, 2012; 2. "Pyramids" Released: June 8, 2012; 3. "Sweet Life" Released: July 6, 2012; 4. "Lost" Released: December 17, 2012; 5. "Super Rich Kids" Released: March 17, 2013

Channel Orange (stylized as channel ORANGE) is the debut studio album by the American R&B singer-songwriter Frank Ocean. It was released on July 10, 2012, by Def Jam Recordings. After releasing his mixtape Nostalgia, Ultra the previous year, Ocean began writing new songs with Malay, a producer and songwriter who then assisted him with recording Channel Orange at EastWest Studios in Hollywood. Rather than rely on samples as he had with his mixtape, Ocean wanted to approach sound and song structure differently on the album. Other producers who worked on the album included Om'Mas Keith and Pharrell Williams. Its recording also featured guest appearances from Odd Future rappers Earl Sweatshirt and Tyler, the Creator, vocalist/songwriter André 3000, and guitarist John Mayer.

Noted by writers as musically unconventional, Channel Orange draws on electro-funk, pop-soul, jazz-funk, and psychedelic styles, as well as nonmusical sounds such as film dialogue and ambient noise that function as interludes. Vocally, Ocean uses a free-form flow as well as alternating falsetto and tenor registers throughout the album. His songwriting explores themes of unrequited love, decadence, social class, and drugs through the use of surrealistic imagery, conversational devices, and descriptive narratives depicting dark characters. He titled the album as a reference to the neurological phenomenon grapheme–color synesthesia, through which he had perceived the color orange during the summer he first fell in love.

To prevent Channel Orange from leaking onto the Internet, Ocean and Def Jam released the album digitally one week earlier than its publicly announced date. It was promoted with five singles, including Ocean's highest-charting single "Thinkin Bout You" (number 32 on the US Billboard Hot 100) and a supporting concert tour in July 2012. Channel Orange debuted at number two on the US Billboard 200 and sold 131,000 copies in its first week, eventually selling 621,000 copies in the US by September 2014. Critically, it was the best-reviewed album of 2012 and the year's top-ranked album in numerous critics' lists, including the American Pazz & Jop and the British HMV Poll of Polls. At the 2013 Grammy Awards, Channel Orange was nominated for Album of the Year and won Best Urban Contemporary Album. Since then, it has featured in several professional lists ranking the best albums from the 2010s as well as all time.

== Background ==
Frustrated with Def Jam Recordings' inactivity in his recording career, Frank Ocean released his debut mixtape Nostalgia, Ultra online for free in February 2011. It showcased the singer's original tracks, repurposed songs by other recording acts, and featured musical and lyrical elements unconventional in R&B. Although it lacked conventional promotion, the mixtape attained a following among listeners and received critical acclaim. Ocean and Def Jam eventually mended their relationship, and while a planned contracted edition of Nostalgia, Ultra never materialized, the label released two of its songs as singles, including the Billboard charting "Novacane". An agreement was then reached to release a tentative follow-up album for 2012.

== Writing ==
Ocean started writing songs for Channel Orange in February 2011 with songwriter and producer Malay, his friend and creative partner since their start in the music industry as songwriters. They originally met in Atlanta and worked for the same publishing company, through which they reconnected after Malay moved to Los Angeles. Ocean spent more time with Malay, introducing him to his Odd Future collective, while connecting creatively through their respective songwriting, which led to their partnership for Channel Orange. For the album, Ocean wrote his lyrics to complement Malay's ideas for the music. Occasionally, they wrote songs together by improvising musical ideas from Malay's keyboard and guitar playing. Channel Orange was written in two weeks, according to the singer.

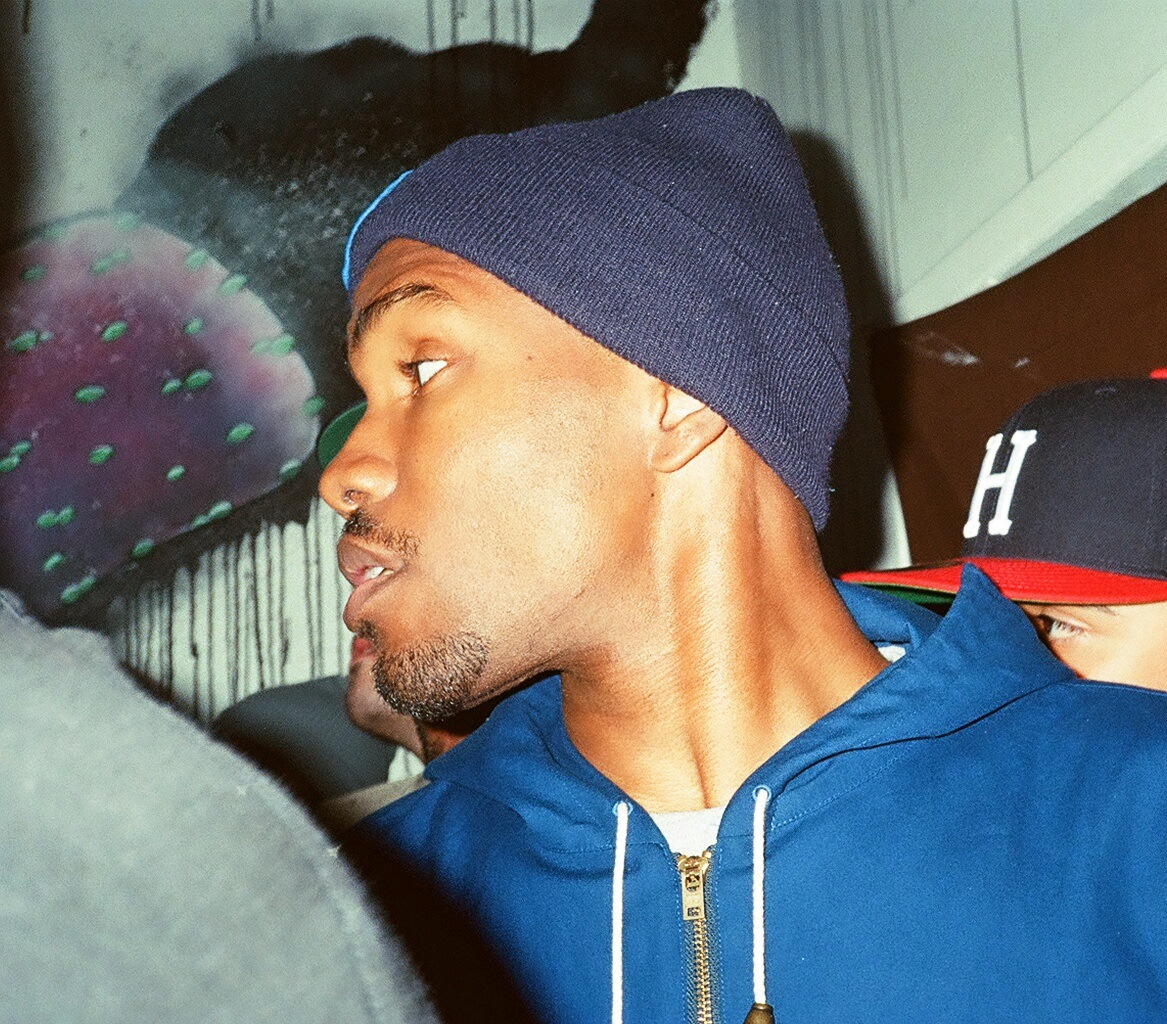
Ocean (photographed in 2011) mused over past experiences and pure fantasy when writing the album.

Although Ocean had creative freedom for both projects, he felt more confident as a songwriter for Channel Orange and typed his lyrics on a laptop rather than composing in his head as he had done for Nostalgia, Ultra. Since transitioning from writing for other artists, he had been influenced by his "gloriously painful love life" when writing songs. For his lyrics, Ocean used both his past personal experiences and imagination to compose narratives for songs. He was inspired to write the song "Crack Rock" by stories he heard sitting in on Narcotics Anonymous and Alcoholics Anonymous groups mentored by his grandfather, who also dealt with substance abuse in his youth. In an interview for The Guardian, Ocean expressed uncertainty about his penchant for darker subject matter, but speculated that "those were the colours I had to work with on those days. ... I mean, 'experience' is an interesting word. I just bear witness."

In June 2012, news outlets and music journalists from pre-release listening events for Channel Orange raised questions about certain songs' lyrics and Ocean's sexuality. The lyrics addressed a male object of love and deviated from the heterosexual perspective of his past songs. Scrapping his original plan of including it in the album's liner notes, Ocean published a TextEdit file as an open letter through his Tumblr blog on July 4. Originally written in December 2011, it recounted his unrequited feelings for a man when he was 19 years old, citing the experience as his first love. Ocean's disclosure was received with support from Def Jam and praise from other recording artists and cultural commentators. He also remarked on writing Channel Orange after years of emotional struggle with the experience, stating in the letter, "I wrote to keep myself busy and sane. I wanted to create worlds that were rosier than mine. I tried to channel overwhelming emotions."

During their writing sessions, Malay noticed Ocean's use of gender pronouns in his lyrics, but attributed it to Ocean's poetic license rather than his sexuality. In an interview after Ocean's open letter, Malay called him "the new hybrid of what an MC used to be in the '80s or '90s ... the true storyteller" and said of the lyrics, "I don't think anyone during any given point during the creative process knew what was happening ... when he's singing maybe from a female perspective or whatever, it's a story, it's a world that he created. It's not necessarily his personal—like something that he's experiencing. Maybe it is and it's a metaphor the way he did it". They finished writing Channel Orange in two to three months. Ocean said of the album's development in an interview for Rap-Up, "It succinctly defines me as an artist for where I am right now and that was the aim. It's about the stories. If I write 14 stories that I love, then the next step is to get the environment of music around it to best envelop the story and all kinds of sonic goodness."

== Recording and production ==
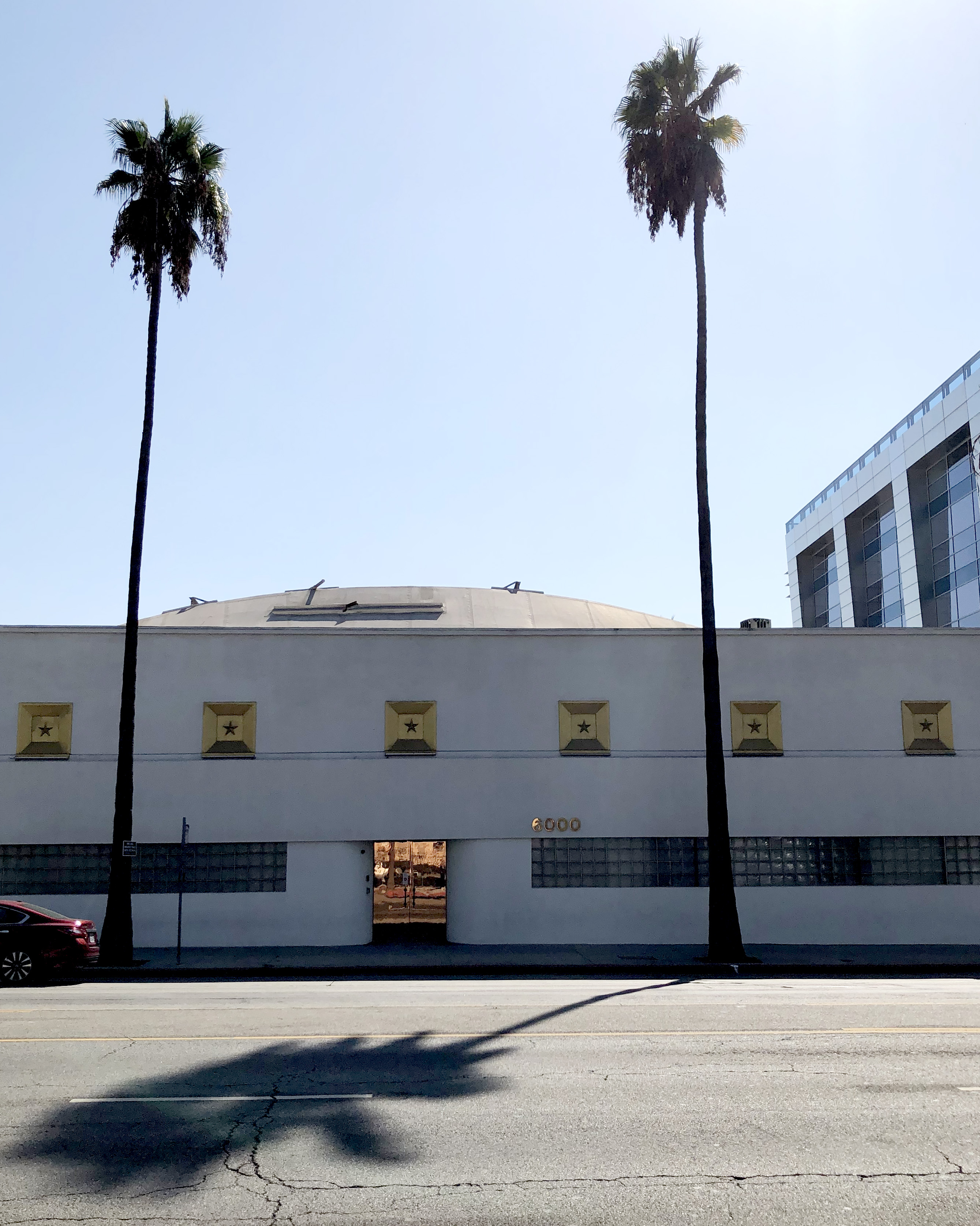
The exterior of EastWest Studios in Hollywood, where the album was mainly recorded

Once the songs were written, Ocean ordered them into what ultimately became the album's track listing and began recording them in that order. He recorded most of the album at EastWest Studios in Hollywood, near where he was renting a home at the time. The studio complex featured recording equipment from the 1960s. Other recording locations included Henson Recording Studios and the Record Plant in Hollywood, Westlake Recording Studios and Studio for the Talented and Gifted in Los Angeles, Manhattan Sound Recording in New York City, and San Ysidro in Beverly Hills. He originally planned to rent recording equipment and the Beverly Hills mansion alone rather than rent a studio for $1,600 a day. He had a maid at the mansion and enjoyed amenities such as a pool and a sauna, but ended up recording only three songs there—"Lost", "Pyramids", and "Analog 2", a collaboration with fellow Odd Future member Tyler, the Creator.

Ocean recorded his vocals alone for several months, striving intensively for high performance standards, before rejoining Malay for the album's production. Ocean produced most of Channel Orange and was assisted by Malay, who also played guitar, bass, keyboards, and brass instruments. He described his own contributions as "behind the scenes" to Ocean's "diligent" work ethic. Ocean wanted to experiment sonically and approach song structure differently than he had before. For inspiration, he and Malay listened to older records to either use as musical references or set a mood at the studio, listening to music by Stevie Wonder, Marvin Gaye, Sly and the Family Stone, Pink Floyd, and Jimi Hendrix. They also put up posters of Pink Floyd and Bruce Lee, and projected inaudible old movies in the studio's background.

Their production also emphasized instrumentation and was a departure for Ocean after Nostalgia, Ultra's reliance on samples. In the studio, they reworked the musical ideas from their writing sessions, incorporated live production, and ornamented their songs musically. Ocean enlisted Los Angeles-based producer Om'Mas Keith to help him rework the songs. They added live drums to "Crack Rock", "Monks", and "Sweet Life", which was originally produced as a digital track. Originally written by Ocean for singer Bridget Kelly, "Thinkin Bout You" had been recorded as an early take by him and posted on his Tumblr account in July. Ocean and Malay's final mix of the song for the album added a strings intro. For "Bad Religion", engineer Jeff Ellis tried to compensate for the few string players they had by arranging seating for a large string section in EastWest's Studio 1 and using a pair of old stereo ribbon microphones to capture the sound. They sat players in different seats each time they played along with the track in order to mix all of the takes together and give the impression of a larger ensemble.

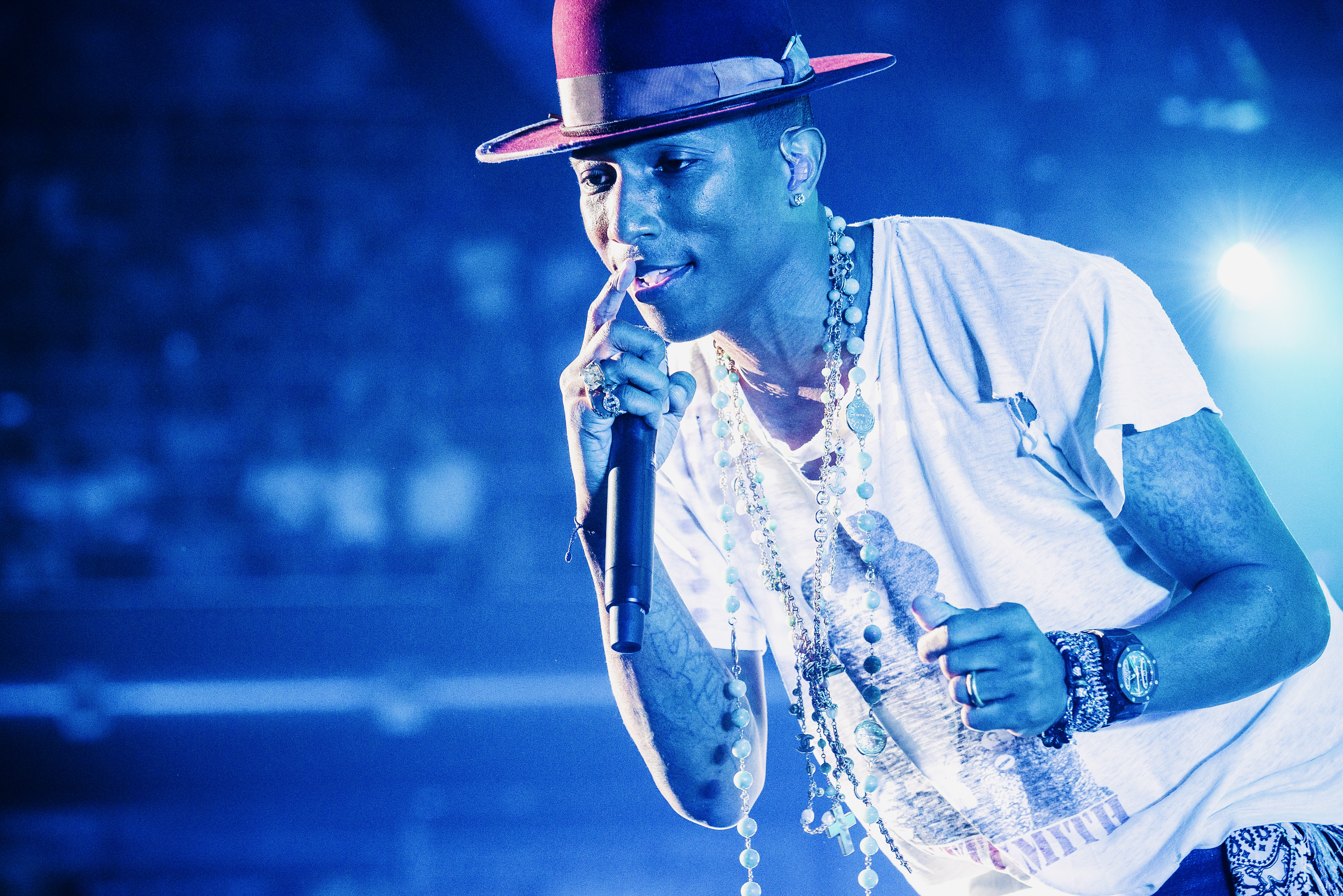
Pharrell Williams (2014) contributed as a producer, programmer, and keyboardist on the album.

In the wake of Nostalgia, Ultra, other artists took interest in Ocean and contacted him about working together, leading to collaborations on Channel Orange. He previewed songs at different stages of completion to get feedback from guest artists, some of whom he cited as his "creative heroes", including record producer Pharrell Williams, who co-wrote and co-produced "Sweet Life" with Ocean. Ocean and Malay previewed songs to rock musician John Mayer, which inspired his guitar playing for both "Pyramids" and "White". For the latter track, they used the instrumental of the song of the same name from Odd Future's 2012 album The OF Tape Vol. 2, recorded atmospheric instrumentation by Mayer and other musicians, and tracked it to the original instrumental.

Ocean reached out to rappers André 3000 and Big Boi of hip-hop duo Outkast to appear on "Pink Matter". However, André 3000 did not want to reunite with Big Boi as a duo on another artist's album. The former ended up rapping alone and playing guitar on the song. Ocean told him to tell any kind of story with his verse for "Pink Matter". As André 3000 recalled, "when I got the track, I just started writing to it and I was just, I'm just happy to be a part of that whole movement and his whole movement because he has become a whole 'nother kind of icon in today's age."

Ocean and Malay mixed Channel Orange at Studio for the Talented and Gifted, and engineer Spike Stent mixed parts of the album at The Mix Suite in Los Angeles. It was mastered by Vlado Meller at Masterdisk in New York City. Malay said that he and Ocean focused on sonic "intricacies" such as interludes and skits on tracks when mixing the album, which he referred to as their "art project". Ocean said that he admires "the anonymity that directors can have about their films" and explained his use of interludes on the album, saying that "the work is the work. The work is not me ... Even though it's my voice, I'm a storyteller."

== Music ==
According to music journalists, Channel Orange has an unconventional musical style, with influences from psychedelic, pop-soul, jazz-funk, and electro-funk genres. HipHopDX categorized it as an alternative R&B album, while Evan Rytlewski from The A.V. Club called it a neo soul record and Time Out New York's Hank Shteamer described it as progressive soul. Sputnikmusic's Sobhi Youssef remarked that, although its production "pull[s] from a spectrum of popular modern and classic influences", they are used "within the 'constraints' of R&B without any singular genre taking over the record." Songs on the album are characterized by electronic keyboard, muted percussion, fluctuating backing tracks, shifting synthesizers, vamps, vibrant guitar, and hazy electronic effects such as dub reverb. Tiny Mix Tapes wrote that first half's "spacious" production recalls the "electric soul influence" of Shuggie Otis, while Jody Rosen observed "chord changes straight out of [Stevie] Wonder's Innervisions, airy vamps that nod to [Marvin] Gaye's Here, My Dear, [and] snarling guitars that recall Prince's Purple Rain". Chris Richards of The Washington Post compared its melodic sensibilities to those of Gaye and Wonder, and its loose song structures to those of D'Angelo, Maxwell, and Erykah Badu. Time magazine's Melissa Locker noted melodramatic elements such as "haunting melodies" similar to The-Dream's 2007 album Love/Hate.

Less melodic and hook-oriented than Nostalgia, Ultra, Channel Orange features subtle melodies and articulation, spatial arrangements, and mid-tempo drum beats, although the more ruminative songs feature slower tempos. Robert Christgau asserted that, without its predecessor's reliance on samples, "Ocean resists making a show of himself—resists the dope hook, the smart tempo, the transcendent falsetto itself." Ocean, a baritone, sings with casually expressive vocals, free-form flow, conversational crooning, and alternating falsetto and tenor registers.

Similar to Nostalgia, Ultra, Channel Orange has interludes that feature sounds of organs, waves, tape decks, car doors, channel surfing, white noise, and dialogue. They exhibit an analog sound quality, and some end abruptly. Writers interpret them to represent the limited attention span of listeners, moments in Ocean's life, the distortion inside his mind, nostalgic ephemera, or a synesthesia-inspired theme. Jesse Cataldo of Slant Magazine viewed that the segues, along with the other songs' disparate lengths, give the album the feel of a mixtape. According to Hayley Louise Brown from Clash, the songs are "interwoven by the ambient noise of middle America – video games, TV commercials, aeroplanes and car doors".

=== Lyrics ===
The songs are confessional yet guarded, alive to all sorts of musical and lyrical possibilities, working in a number of genres within the space of a single composition, alert to both dream imagery and realistic observations of the world around him. As a Hollywood transplant, Frank Ocean is into make-believe – and the question of how you create and deconstruct make-believe.

— Ken Tucker (2012)

Channel Orange has themes of unrequited love, sex, and existential longing. Allusions to Ocean's own experience with unrequited love are featured in several songs, including "Thinkin Bout You", "Bad Religion", and "Forrest Gump". Jon Caramanica of The New York Times found the album to be "rife with the sting of unrequited love, both on the receiving and inflicting ends", with "lovers who tantalize but remain at arm's length." Ryan Dombal from Pitchfork said Ocean exhibits "a timeless philosophy ... one of hard-won acceptance and the acknowledgement that love and sex and loss will always draw legends to them." The album also explores decadence, the trappings of class disparity, drug dependency, and the tension between spirituality and secularity, a prevalent theme in soul music. Music journalist Sasha Frere-Jones noted "a combination of decadence and spiritual ache similar to Prince's". Greg Kot wrote that Ocean presents "a dialogue between his self-gratifying lust and more selfless conscience", with Prince-like "psychedelic-gospel inflections" and Marvin Gaye-like overdubbing of Ocean's vocals, which give the impression of voices in conversation with one another. Jason Lipshutz of Billboard viewed that Ocean examines love in the context of money, drugs, and sex.

Ocean's songwriting uses descriptive narratives, dense metre, surrealistic imagery, empathic sentiments, deadpan humor, overt metaphors, and conversational devices. John Calvert of The Quietus wrote that his lyrics treat love as "innocent", and feature "flying-as-love" metaphors and "respectful euphemisms" for sex such as a flight on a "fighter jet". Embling of Tiny Mix Tapes regarded Channel Orange as a "songwriter's album" and views that, although "the emotions, mood, and melodies are broad enough to draw listeners in", Ocean's lyrics are "apocryphal, allowing for personal interpretations". Ocean's narratives generally depict dark, broken characters, and a Southern California setting, with references to its sunny, coastal environment in both the lyrics and melodies. Randall Roberts of the Los Angeles Times categorized Channel Orange as a concept album about "the twentysomething experience in Los Angeles", while Greg Kot interpreted the California setting to be "a state of mind in Ocean['s] world: numb, deceptively luxurious and self-satisfied, where the denizens live disconnected from one another and the world."

=== Songs ===
"Sierra Leone"
The polyphonic song features faded synths, sweeping strings, and percussion buried in the mix. It is composed as a character sketch of a young parent, who sings his infant daughter to sleep.

The opening track "Start" is a snippet of ambient sounds, bits of silence, and flickers of noise, including a PlayStation booting up. The low-key torch song "Thinkin Bout You" features soothing synth cycles, sparse keyboards, muffled electronic percussion, and lyrics addressing a lover with white lies in the verses and thoughts of eternal love in the chorus. "Fertilizer" is based on James Fauntleroy's 2010 song of the same name, repurposed on the album as an AM radio jingle and interlude about "bullshit". "Sierra Leone" incorporates chillwave and quiet storm styles, wind chime sounds, lo-fi beats, and polyphony similar to Prince's 1985 song "Paisley Park". Its lyrics address sex, conception, early parenthood, and childhood dreams. It recounts the narrator's lust for a girl as a teenager, and compares their relationship to the vicissitudes of Sierra Leone such as diamonds and civil war. Ocean's singing exhibits quickly descending chord succession and is overdubbed against his spoken vocals.

"Sweet Life" and "Super Rich Kids" depict decadent, alluring rich people, and are tied together by "Not Just Money", a spoken interlude with a woman discussing the importance of money on happiness. "Super Rich Kids" references the thumping piano line of Elton John's 1973 song "Bennie and the Jets" and addresses young, wealthy characters' ennui and fears of the 2008 financial crisis with dry humor. "Pilot Jones" employs magic realism and escapist imagery, and depicts an emotional dependency between drug addicts, who confuse friendship with sexual love in their support of each other. The swooning song contains hazy electronic blips, impressionistic textures, experimental beat patterns, refracted sound effects, and vocal improvisation expressing the narrator's "high". "Crack Rock" depicts a crack addict, likens love to the highs and lows of drug use, and broadly addresses corruption, broken homes, gun violence, and government indifference to rising crack-related deaths. It has fleeting multi-tracked harmonies, a non-sequitur chorus, and Ocean's occasionally fractured breathiness conveying an addict's voice.

"Bad Religion"
The confessional song incorporates gospel and baroque pop styles, and string dynamics corresponding to Ocean's vocal intonation. His lyrics touch on the conflict between pleasure and godliness, a common trope in R&B.

"Pyramids" is cited by writers as the album's centerpiece. Brice Ezell from PopMatters wrote that it denotes "the vital midpoint of the overarching narrative", where "the wittier tone of the record's front half gives way to an emotionally dense second half." Veering from synth-funk to slow jam styles, the song has a lyrical conceit that uses Ancient Egyptian and Biblical imagery, and contrasts the legendary fall of Cleopatra with the circumstances of a latter-day working girl, who dances at a strip club called the Pyramid to support her man's gaudy aspirations. The new wave-styled "Lost" is about a perplexed addict, who hopes for a better life for him and his drug-cooking girlfriend. "Monks", a funk rock song, is about finding nirvana and deals with topics such as casual sex and devout religion in a narrative that shifts from an exciting concert to a metaphorical jungle. "Bad Religion" features melodramatic, orchestral music and a series of figures, including strings, handclaps, marching band snare drums, and mournful organ chords. The lyrics follow an emotional confession to a taxi driver by a narrator brooding over a secretive intimate relationship. Music journalist Alexis Petridis asserted that the song "repurpos[es] the battle between religion and lust that's been at the heart of soul music since it ceded from gospel".

"Pink Matter" is a bluesy lament with themes of sex and betrayal, as its narrator struggles between pleasure and universal meaning. Its lyrics allude to philosophical conundrums, extraterrestrial life, Japanese manga comics, and cotton candy. The playful "Forrest Gump" likens Tom Hanks' titular film character to an adolescent crush, with homoerotic, tongue-in-cheek lyrics, and allusions to scenes in the film. It has a bright, Motown-inspired chorus, a simple rhythmic cadence, gently strummed guitar, wistful vocals, and a perkily whistled coda. The skit "End" depicts an exchange between Ocean and a woman as they make love in the backseat of a car with his 2012 song "Voodoo" playing over the stereo. She says to him, "You're special. I wish you could see what I see", repurposing a line from the 2006 film ATL, and Ocean leaves the car in response, walks home through the rain, and sets his keys down with a sigh. The lighthearted, lovelorn "Golden Girl" has up-tempo synths, gradual fades, and Tyler, The Creator rapping in a low-pitched, demonic voice. It is about a girl that provides salvation and peace of mind for the narrator, who likens her to an island.

== Title and packaging ==
"Orange reminds me of the summer I first fell in love. Awww...."

— Frank Ocean on Tumblr weeks before the album's release.

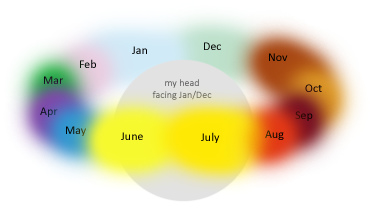
The album is titled after Ocean's visualization of orange colors during summer months due to synesthesia. Above is a possible association of months with colors by a person subject to the phenomenon.

Ocean titled the album in reference to his experience with grapheme–color synesthesia, a neurological phenomenon in which an individual's perception of numbers and letters is associated with the experience of colors. He discussed the phenomenon with Pharrell Williams, who had also experienced it and similarly referenced it for the title of his side project N.E.R.D.'s 2008 album Seeing Sounds. The title also alludes to the first time that Ocean fell in love, as it was summer and he perceived everything to be orange. Ocean's mother called it "a perfect summertime album" after attending a listening session.

According to Malay, Kanye West helped Ocean during the album's final stages by providing "a mentorship situation" and connecting him with his "visual people". (Note: West had also experienced synesthesia as a youth and used it as an inspiration when creating his short film Cruel Summer in 2012.) Malay recalled how he and Ocean were "somewhat oblivious to how quickly everything happened" and Ocean's name "continuing to get bigger and bigger" as they completed the album. To downplay himself from being "the focal point" of the album, Ocean did not want his name on the cover and had Everest, his Bernese Mountain Dog, credited as the executive producer instead.

The album artwork was designed by Thomas Mastorakos, Aaron Martinez, and Phil Toselli, with photography by Dave Eggar. The front cover features an orange background superimposed by the title – "channel" rendered in lower-case Cooper Black font and "orange" rendered in all upper-case Sans-serif, with the former overlaid by an image of colored spots from a camera flash, in a way evocative of sun glitter. The cover was revealed on June 23, 2012, via online media outlets. In November 2013, it was ranked at number nine on Complex magazine's list of "The 50 Best Pop Album Covers of the Past Five Years", with contributing journalist Dale Eisinger writing in an accompanying essay: "Ocean took a simple route with the cover ... Employing the classic Cooper Black font — a staple of his Odd Future crew and hip-hop history, alike — next to a more modern, Sans-Serif font shows just how smart this dude is, looking back to the past, while clearly aware of his surroundings."

== Marketing and sales ==
To prevent Channel Orange from leaking onto the Internet, Ocean planned to release it digitally one week earlier than its publicly announced date. He was inspired by West and Jay-Z, who prevented their 2011 album Watch the Throne from leaking by announcing several misleading release dates. On June 8, Ocean announced a July 17 release date and released a trailer for the album directed by Nabil Elderkin. On July 9, he made his television debut on Late Night with Jimmy Fallon and performed "Bad Religion" with backing from the show's house band The Roots and a strings section. The show announced the album's actual release date and vendor, Universal Music Group, who made it available on July 10 as a digital download on iTunes. Ocean said at the time, "I haven't even held one in my hands ... The [CDs] are done, but when we sent them in, they were locked down at the manufacturer. They haven't left. They never went on trucks [to stores] because that's where things leak."

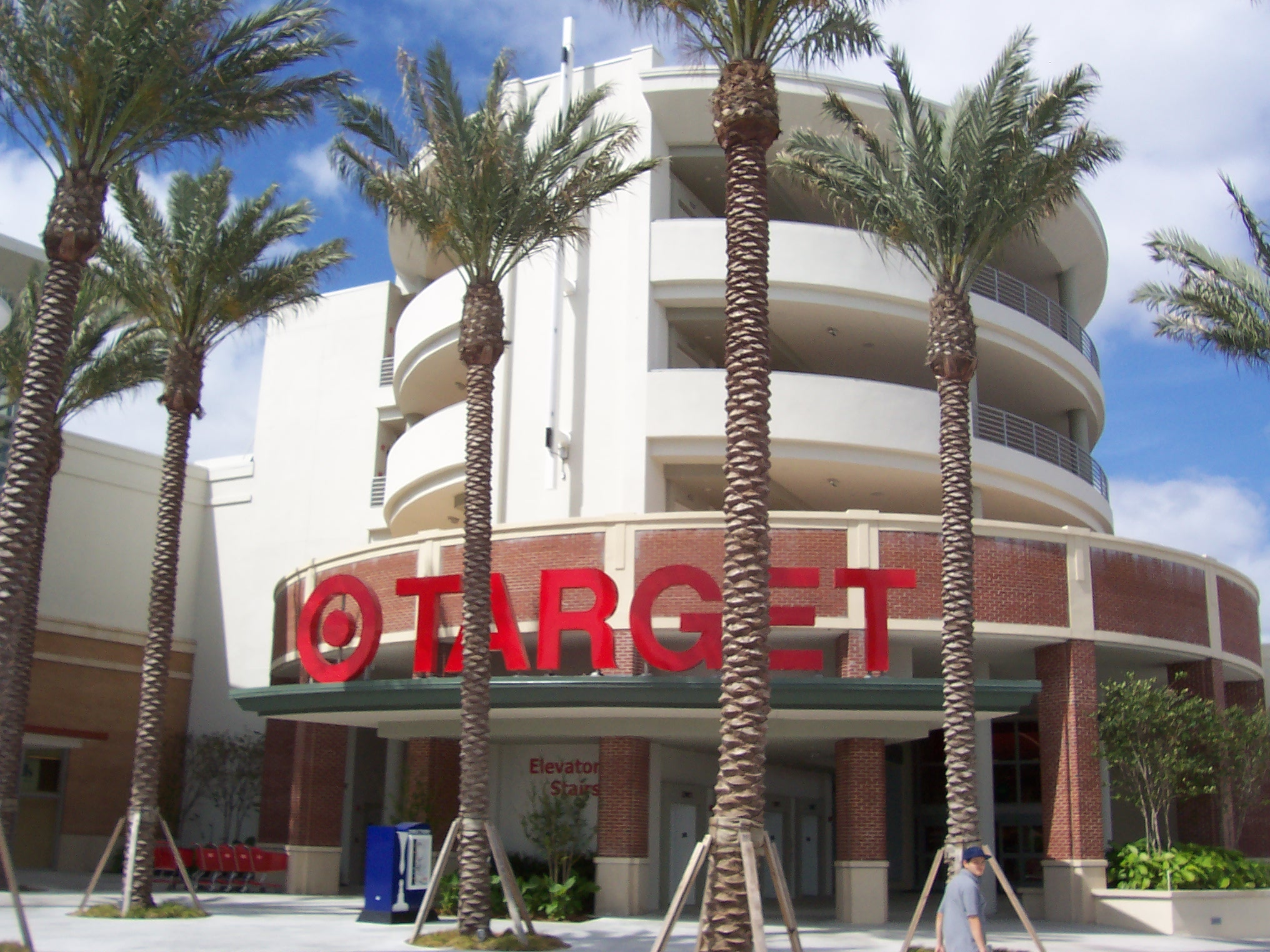
Retail giant Target (Miami location pictured) refused to stock the album in response to its preemptive release.

Channel Orange was sold exclusively through iTunes until July 17, when it was released to other digital retailers. Although its wide physical release was scheduled for July 17, Universal encouraged physical retailers to start selling it immediately after they receive shipments of the album. Retail company Target did not approve of its early release to iTunes and chose not to stock the album. Ocean's manager Christian Clancy responded in a message on Twitter that he found it "interesting" that Target "also donates to non-equal rights organizations", suggesting their decision was influenced by Ocean's coming out. Target representatives dismissed Clancy's claims as "absolutely false" in a subsequent statement to MTV News, saying that the company "supports inclusivity and diversity in every aspect of our business. Our assortment decisions are based on a number of factors, including guest demand."

In its first week of release, Channel Orange sold 131,000 copies and debuted at number two on the US Billboard 200 on July 18, 2012. The majority of its first-week sales were digital copies from iTunes, while approximately 3,000 of the sales were physical copies. Digital copies sold for $2.99 at Amazon were excluded from Nielsen SoundScan's sales data, as Billboard's chart policy disqualified albums sold for less than $3.49 from charting. The album sold 54,000 copies in its second week, excluding discounted copies sold by Amazon.com, which Billboard estimated to be approximately 15,000 copies. Channel Orange also debuted at number two on the British albums chart with first-week sales of 13,000 copies. It was the first album to chart within the top 20 in the United Kingdom solely on digital sales. In Canada, the album debuted at number three on first-week sales of 6,700 copies.

Five singles were released from the album—"Thinkin Bout You" on April 17, 2012, "Pyramids" on June 8, "Sweet Life" on July 6, "Lost" on December 17, and "Super Rich Kids" on March 17, 2013. "Thinkin Bout You" became Ocean's highest-charting single in the US, peaking at number 32 on the Billboard Hot 100. Ocean performed the song on the 2012 MTV Video Music Awards on September 6, 2012, and the following week, Channel Orange sold almost 14,000 more copies. Ocean also performed "Thinkin Bout You" and "Pyramids" on Saturday Night Live on September 15, the latter of which featured John Mayer on guitar. By September 2016, the album had sold 686,000 copies in United States.

== Touring ==
Ocean embarked on a 14-date North American tour in July 2012 supporting the album. Announced on June 8, the tour had sold out by July 9. On its number of shows, Ocean explained that he wanted to provide quality over quantity and said that "it's not about let's do a million things right now. It's about let's just do our best to do the best things right now." Malay joined him as the tour's musical director and said that it would expand on the production of Ocean's previous concerts for Nostalgia, Ultra. Their stage setup featured a guitarist, bassist, drummer, two pianos, and a DJ setup behind television monitor props, which showed ever-changing images.

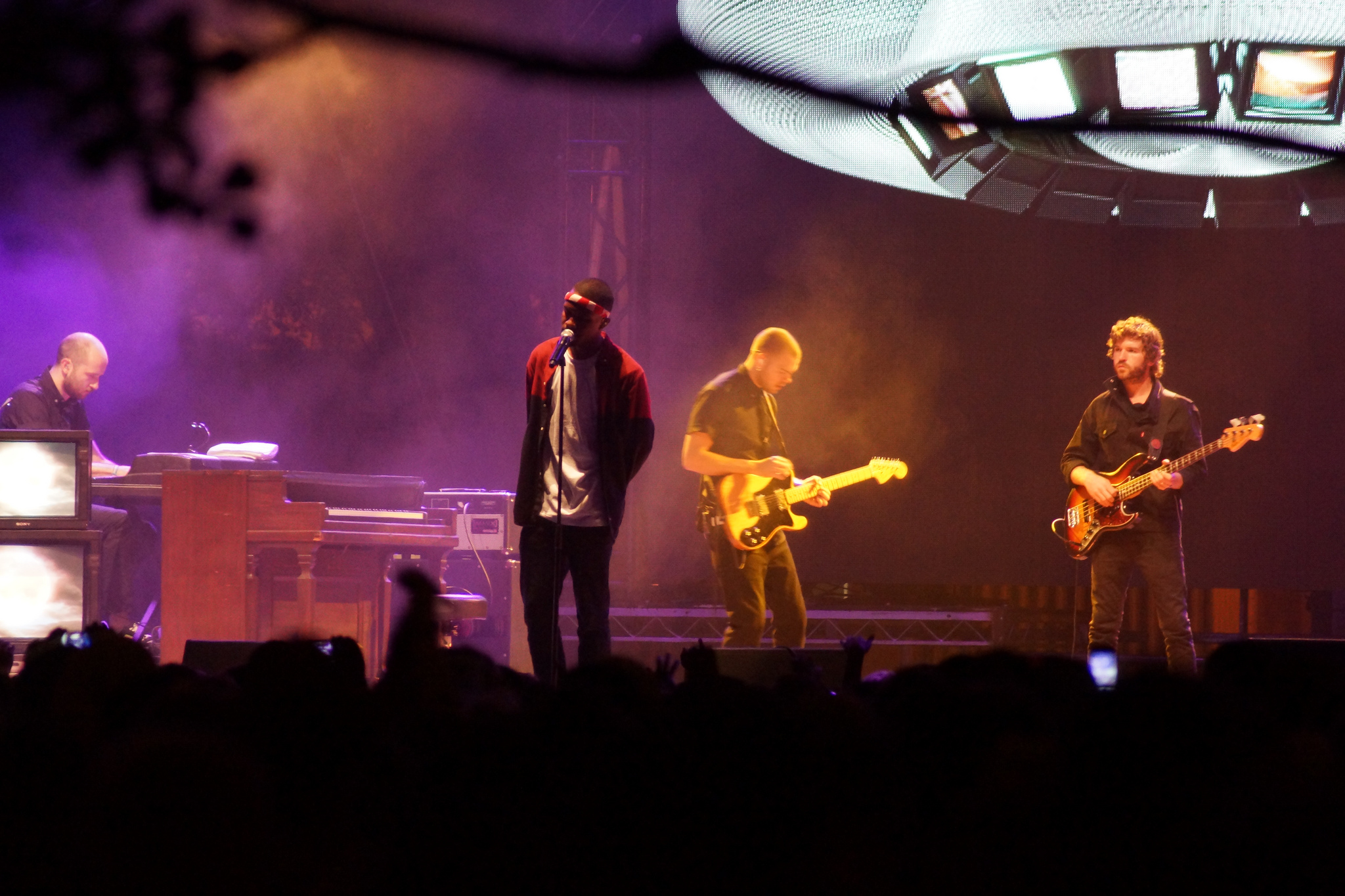
Ocean performing at Lollapalooza on August 4, 2012.

Along with songs from Nostalgia, Ultra and Channel Orange, Ocean performed "Made in America", his unreleased songs "Summer Remains" and "Voodoo", and covers of Prince's "When You Were Mine" (1980), Beyoncé's "I Miss You" (2011), and Sade's "By Your Side" (2000). Reviewers of the shows noted Ocean's low-key stage presence and observed crowd screams and audience members singing-along to songs. After his performance at the 9:30 Club in Washington, D.C., Ocean reflected on the tour and wrote on his Twitter account, "This tourlife takes some getting used to. I get to zone out and be someones hero or deviant fantasy or whatever for a hour [sic] and some change every night though. That's special, and the women still scream in the front row." Ocean cancelled his tour-closing show at Saint Andrew's Hall in Detroit on August 1 due to illness.

After the tour, Ocean was slated to perform at several music festivals, including Lollapalooza, where he headlined the second day of the festival. During an August performance at Øyafestivalen in Norway, Ocean lost his voice and ended his set early. He later withdrew from his European tour dates altogether, including English rock band Coldplay's Mylo Xyloto Tour, on which he would have been the opening act during the tour's European leg in August and September. Although he did not specify his reason, Ocean issued a statement to organizers of the Way Out West Festival in Sweden, saying that "Let me start by saying I feel like an asshole right now, but a tough decision had to be made in regard to my schedule over the next months ... Sorry as fuck, I'll be back if you'll have me." He returned to perform at the All Tomorrow's Parties festival in New York City on September 21.

== Critical reception ==
Channel Orange ratings
Aggregate scores
Source	Rating
AnyDecentMusic?	8.9/10
Metacritic	92/100
Review scores
Source	Rating
AllMusic	5/5 stars
The Daily Telegraph	5/5 stars
The Guardian	5/5 stars
The Independent	4/5 stars
MSN Music (Expert Witness)	A−
NME	7/10
Pitchfork	9.5/10
Rolling Stone	4/5 stars
Spin	9/10
USA Today	3.5/4 stars

Channel Orange was met with widespread critical acclaim. At Metacritic, which assigns a normalized rating out of 100 to reviews from professional critics, the album received an average score of 92, based on 46 reviews. According to the website's editor Jason Dietz, it was the "best-reviewed major album" of 2012, as well as "one of the best-reviewed albums of the past decade". Aggregator AnyDecentMusic? gave it 8.9 out of 10, based on their assessment of the critical consensus.

Reviewing in July 2012 for The Daily Telegraph, Neil McCormick said Ocean has drawn on a variety of musical ideas and pushed the boundaries of the electronic, beat-driven sounds currently dominating popular music. He summarized Channel Orange as "accessible enough for broad popularity yet operating in a pioneering realm closer to the avant-garde." The album was called "an expansive, slow-burning classic that repays patience and close attention" by Killian Fox in The Observer, while musicOMH critic Laurence Green described the music as "a cherry-picking of life's cacophony repainted into the most enchanting of collages". Slant Magazine's Jesse Cataldo hailed it as a "mosaic work ... so textured, complex, and mature that Ocean's recent coming out feels like a footnote". For AllMusic, Andy Kellman wrote that Ocean's "descriptive and subtle storytelling is taken to a higher level" than on Nostalgia, Ultra, while Mike Powell from Spin considered his tempered singing to be a sign of "exceptional wisdom and repose". Fellow Spin writer Barry Walters identified the album as a key release of alternative R&B, alongside others by contemporaries Drake, the Weeknd, and Miguel, while adding that "Ocean's singer-songwriter candor combined with arrangements that stretch from EDM to prog-rock and progressive soul could be the tipping point for a type of rock/R&B crossover that's taken place under different labels since Jimi Hendrix got Experienced." State journalist Fintan Walsh said Ocean's lyrics capture "the modern youth" just as Brian Wilson's Pet Sounds album had in 1966, calling Channel Orange "a masterful, dynamic and evocative collection of conversations between his inner-self and the listener".

Some reviewers were more qualified in their praise. In Rolling Stone, Jody Rosen preferred the album's more structured songs and argued that Ocean sometimes seems to be "less a songwriter than a purveyor of formless grooves". Priya Elan of NME said the "inventive and spirited" album's music occasionally sounds overindulgent. Writing for MSN Music, Robert Christgau believed Ocean's musical compositions are more consistent here than on Nostalgia, Ultra but questioned the singer's topical fascinations with the "haut-monde demimonde", finding the lyrics less relatable and interesting.

=== Accolades ===
At the end of 2012, Channel Orange was named the year's best album by numerous publications, including the Chicago Sun-Times, Chicago Tribune, Billboard, Entertainment Weekly, The Guardian, the Los Angeles Times, The Sydney Morning Herald, Now, Paste, PopMatters, Slant Magazine, Spin, and The Washington Post. It was named "Album of the Year" in HMV's Poll of Polls, an annual survey of British journalists from national print and online publications. It was also voted the best album of 2012 in the Pazz & Jop, an annual poll of American critics published by The Village Voice. In an essay for the poll, the newspaper's Eric Sundermann deemed the victory unsurprising as Ocean "dominated most music discussions this past year" and had an equalizing effect on listeners of all music genres. Overall, it was the "top-ranked" album in year-end lists, according to Metacritic.

Channel Orange also earned Ocean several industry awards. It won him the Album of the Year award at the 2012 Soul Train Music Awards and Outstanding Music Artist at the 24th GLAAD Media Awards, where he tied with Adam Lambert for Trespassing. At the 2013 Grammy Awards, it garnered the singer nominations for Album of the Year, Best New Artist, and Record of the Year (for "Thinkin Bout You"), winning for Best Urban Contemporary Album. Ocean agreed to perform at the awards show only if they let him play the song he wanted, "Forrest Gump".

Since then, Channel Orange has appeared on decade-end and all-time critics' lists. In 2013, it was ranked 147th on NME's "The 500 Greatest Albums of All Time". The following year, it was included in the book 1001 Albums You Must Hear Before You Die. In 2019, The Guardian ranked it 12th in a list of the 100 best albums from the 21st century, while on rankings of the 2010s' top albums, Uproxx placed it 13th and Pitchfork placed it 10th. In 2020, Rolling Stone ranked the album at number 148 on the magazine's revision to "The 500 Greatest Albums of All Time" list. Two years later, they also ranked it at number 13 on their "100 Best Debut Albums of All Time" list.

== Track listing ==
Credits are adapted from the American Society of Composers, Authors and Publishers (ASCAP) and Tidal.

Channel Orange standard edition
No.	Title	Writer(s)	Producer(s)	Length
1.	"Start"	Christopher Breaux; James Ho	Frank Ocean; Malay	0:45
2.	"Thinkin Bout You"	Breaux; Shea Taylor	Ocean; Taylor	3:20
3.	"Fertilizer"	James Fauntleroy^{[a]}; Reginald Perry^{[a]}	Ocean; Malay	0:39
4.	"Sierra Leone"	Breaux; Ho	Ocean; Malay; Om'Mas Keith	2:28
5.	"Sweet Life"	Breaux; Pharrell Williams	Ocean; Williams	4:22
6.	"Not Just Money"	Rosie Watson	Jonathan Ikpeazu	0:59
7.	"Super Rich Kids" (featuring Earl Sweatshirt)	Breaux; Ho; Thebe Kgositsile; Mark Morales^{[b]}; Nathaniel Robinson Jr.^{[b]}; Mark Rooney^{[b]}; Kirk Robinson^{[b]}; Roy Hammond^{[b]}	Ocean; Malay; Keith	5:04
8.	"Pilot Jones"	Breaux; Taylor	Ocean; Malay; Keith	3:04
9.	"Crack Rock"	Breaux; Ho	Ocean; Malay; Keith	3:44
10.	"Pyramids"	Breaux; Ho	Ocean; Malay; Keith	9:52
11.	"Lost"	Breaux; Ho; Micah Otano; Edwin Paul Shelton II	Ocean; Malay; Keith	3:54
12.	"White" (featuring John Mayer)	Breaux; Tyler Okonma	Ocean; Tyler, the Creator	1:16
13.	"Monks"	Breaux; Ho	Ocean; Malay; Keith	3:20
14.	"Bad Religion"	Breaux; Monte Neuble; Charlie Gambetta; Kevin Risto; Waynne Nugent	Ocean; Malay; Keith	2:55
15.	"Pink Matter" (featuring André 3000)	Breaux; Ho; André Benjamin	Ocean; Malay; Keith	4:28
16.	"Forrest Gump"	Breaux; Ho	Ocean; Malay; Keith	3:14
17.	"End"	Breaux; Ho	Ocean; Malay	2:14
Total length:				55:49

CD edition
No.	Title	Writer(s)	Length
17.	"End" / "Golden Girl" (featuring Tyler, the Creator)	Breaux; Ho; Williams; Okonma	8:43

Notes

- "Start" features additional vocals by Raymond Buck
- "Not Just Money" features uncredited vocals by Rosie Watson
- "Pilot Jones" features additional vocals by Om'Mas Keith and Juliet Buck
- "Crack Rock" features additional vocals by Om'Mas Keith
- "Lost" features additional vocals by Stacy Barthe and Danielle Miranda-Simms
- "Monks" features background vocals by Lalah Hathaway
- "Forrest Gump" features additional vocals by the Crimson Tide Cheerleaders
- "Golden Girl" begins at 3:44 of track 17 in CD releases

Sample credits

- ^{^[a]} "Fertilizer" is a cover of "Fertilizer", as written and performed by James Fauntleroy.
- ^{^[b]} "Super Rich Kids" contains an interpolation of "Real Love", as written by Mark Morales, Kirk Robinson, Nat Robinson Jr. and Mark C. Rooney.
- "Lost" contains dialogue from the 1998 film Fear and Loathing in Las Vegas.
- "Pink Matter" contains an audio clip from the 1985 film The Last Dragon.
- "End" features a sample of "Voodoo", as written and performed by Frank Ocean; and contains dialogue from the 2006 film ATL.

== Personnel ==
Credits are adapted from the album's liner notes.

=== Musicians ===
- André 3000 – guitars
- Auntie Rosie – additional vocals
- Jeff Babko – keyboards
- Stacy Barthe – additional vocals
- Juliet Buck – additional vocals
- Raymond Buck – additional vocals
- Matt Chamberlain – additional programming, drums
- Crimson Tide Cheerleaders – additional vocals
- Dave Eggar – strings
- "Football game crowd" – additional vocals
- Lalah Hathaway – additional vocals
- Charlie Hunter – bass, guitars
- Taylor Johnson – guitars
- Om'Mas Keith – additional vocals, keyboards
- Malay – additional vocals, additional programming, bass, brass keyboards, guitars
- John Mayer – guitars
- Irvin Mayfield – brass
- Danielle Miranda-Simms – additional vocals
- Frank Ocean – keyboards
- Elizabeth Paige – additional vocals
- Chuck Palmer – strings
- Sara Parkins – strings
- Shea Taylor – keyboards
- Francisco Torres – brass
- Pharrell Williams – additional programming, keyboards

=== Production ===
- Wil Anspach – assistant engineering
- Calvin Bailif – engineering
- Matt Brownlie – assistant engineering
- Chad Carlisle – assistant engineering
- Andrew Coleman – engineering
- Brendan Dekora – assistant engineering
- Nabil Elderkin – photography
- Jeff Ellis – additional mixing, engineering
- Doug Fenske – engineering
- Matty Green – assistant mixing
- Adam Harr – assistant engineering
- Ghazi Hourani – assistant engineering
- Om'Mas Keith – engineering, production
- Ryan Kennedy – assistant engineering
- Miguel Lara – assistant engineering
- Peter Mack – assistant engineering
- Malay – mixing, production
- Aaron Martinez – album art
- Thomas Mastorakos – album art
- Vlado Meller – mastering
- Paul Meyer – assistant engineering
- Frank Ocean – mixing, production
- Pharrell – production
- Mark Santangelo – assistant mastering
- Phillip Scott III – engineering
- Mark "Spike" Stent – mixing
- Pat Thrall – engineering
- Phil Toselli – album art
- Marcos Tovar – engineering
- Vic Wainstein – engineering

== Charts ==
=== Weekly charts ===
2012–2013 chart performance for Channel Orange
Chart (2012–2013)	Peak position
Australian Albums (ARIA)	9
Belgian Albums (Ultratop Flanders)	18
Belgian Albums (Ultratop Wallonia)	94
Canadian Albums (Billboard)	3
Danish Albums (Hitlisten)	2
Dutch Albums (Album Top 100)	13
Dutch Alternative Albums (MegaCharts)	1
French Albums (SNEP)	17
German Albums (Offizielle Top 100)	28
Irish Albums (IRMA)	14
Japanese Albums (Oricon)	86
New Zealand Albums (RMNZ)	14
Norwegian Albums (VG-lista)	1
Scottish Albums (Official Charts)	28
Swedish Albums (Sverigetopplistan)	35
Swiss Albums (Schweizer Hitparade)	20
UK Albums (Official Charts)	2
UK R&B Albums (Official Charts)	1
US Billboard 200	2
US Top R&B/Hip-Hop Albums (Billboard)	1

2016 chart performance for Channel Orange
Chart (2016)	Peak position
US Top Catalog Albums (Billboard)	8

2024–2025 chart performance for Channel Orange
Chart (2024–2025)	Peak position
Greek Albums (IFPI)	1
Icelandic Albums (Tónlistinn)	30
Portuguese Albums (AFP)	57

=== Year-end charts ===
2012 year-end chart performance for Channel Orange
Chart (2012)	Position
Australian Albums (ARIA)	78
Australian Urban Albums (ARIA)	11
Danish Albums (Hitlisten)	29
UK Albums (OCC)	105
US Billboard 200	74
US Top R&B/Hip-Hop Albums (Billboard)	12

2013 year-end chart performance for Channel Orange
Chart (2013)	Position
Australian Albums (ARIA)	56
Australian Urban Albums (ARIA)	7
Danish Albums (Hitlisten)	75
UK Albums (OCC)	136
US Billboard 200	147
US Top R&B/Hip-Hop Albums (Billboard)	26

2015 year-end chart performance for Channel Orange
Chart (2015)	Position
Danish Albums (Hitlisten)	79

2017 year-end chart performance for Channel Orange
Chart (2017)	Position
Danish Albums (Hitlisten)	51

2018 year-end chart performance for Channel Orange
Chart (2018)	Position
Danish Albums (Hitlisten)	85

2019 year-end chart performance for Channel Orange
Chart (2019)	Position
Danish Albums (Hitlisten)	92

2020 year-end chart performance for Channel Orange
Chart (2020)	Position
Danish Albums (Hitlisten)	90
Icelandic Albums (Tónlistinn)	100

2022 year-end chart performance for Channel Orange
Chart (2022)	Position
Danish Albums (Hitlisten)	48
Icelandic Albums (Tónlistinn)	51

2023 year-end chart performance for Channel Orange
Chart (2023)	Position
Danish Albums (Hitlisten)	57
Icelandic Albums (Tónlistinn)	62
US Billboard 200	137

2024 year-end chart performance for Channel Orange
Chart (2024)	Position
Australian Albums (ARIA)	64
Belgian Albums (Ultratop Flanders)	87
Danish Albums (Hitlisten)	37
Dutch Albums (Album Top 100)	44
Icelandic Albums (Tónlistinn)	33
US Billboard 200	76
US Top R&B/Hip-Hop Albums (Billboard)	31

2025 year-end chart performance for Channel Orange
Chart (2025)	Position
Australian Albums (ARIA)	79
Belgian Albums (Ultratop Flanders)	103
Dutch Albums (Album Top 100)	68
Icelandic Albums (Tónlistinn)	45
US Billboard 200	71
US Top R&B/Hip-Hop Albums (Billboard)	20

== Certifications and sales ==
Certifications for Channel Orange
Region	Certification	Certified units/sales
Australia (ARIA)	3× Platinum	210,000^{‡}
Canada (Music Canada)	Gold	40,000^{^}
Denmark (IFPI Danmark)	6× Platinum	120,000^{‡}
Iceland (FHF)	—	3,394
Italy (FIMI)	Gold	25,000^{‡}
New Zealand (RMNZ)	7× Platinum	105,000^{‡}
United Kingdom (BPI)	Platinum	300,000^{‡}
United States (RIAA)	Gold	686,000
^{^} Shipments figures based on certification alone.^{‡} Sales+streaming figures based on certification alone.

== Release history ==
Release dates and formats for Channel Orange
Region	Date	Label(s)	Format(s)	Ref.
Worldwide (iTunes exclusive)	July 10, 2012	Def Jam	Digital download	
Sweden	July 16, 2012	Def Jam	CD	
United Kingdom	July 16, 2012	Mercury	CD	
Canada	July 17, 2012	Def Jam	CD	
Germany	July 17, 2012	Island	CD	
United States	July 17, 2012	Def Jam	CD	
Worldwide	July 17, 2012	Def Jam	Digital download	
Netherlands	July 19, 2012	Island	CD	
Australia	July 23, 2012	Universal	CD	
France	July 23, 2012	Universal	CD	
Worldwide	June 26, 2025	Blonded	Vinyl	

== See also ==
- List of number-one albums in Norway
- List of Billboard number-one R&B albums of 2012
- List of UK R&B Albums Chart number ones of 2012

== Notes ==
2. Frank Ocean had put his dog as an executive producer meaning Ocean's dog is the first dog ever to win a grammy
