= Nikes (Frank Ocean song) =

2016 single by Frank Ocean

Single by Frank Ocean

from the album Blonde
- Released: August 20, 2016
- Studio: Abbey Road Studios (London)
- Genre: Futuristic R&B
- Length: 5:14
- Label: Boys Don't Cry
- Songwriters: Christopher Breaux; James Litherland
- Producers: Frank Ocean; Malay Ho; Om'Mas Keith

Frank Ocean singles chronology
"Super Rich Kids" (2013)	"Nikes" (2016)	"Slide" (2017)

Music video
- "Nikes" on Apple Music

"Nikes" is a song recorded by American singer Frank Ocean. It was released on August 20, 2016, as the lead single from his second studio album, Blonde (2016), accompanied by a music video directed by Tyrone Lebon, exclusive to Apple Music. It is Ocean's first single since "Super Rich Kids", which was released in 2013. Ocean wrote the song with James Blake, producing it alongside Malay Ho and Om'Mas Keith. Former Dirty Projectors vocalist Amber Coffman contributed additional vocals. An extended version of the song featuring Japanese rapper Kohh was included on the physical CD release of Blonde.

== Critical reception ==
"Nikes" is a futuristic R&B song.

Billboard ranked "Nikes" at number 28 on their "100 Best Pop Songs of 2016" list: "As the first song on the most highly-anticipated album since D'Angelo re-emerged with Black Messiah, "Nikes" was always going to be heavily scrutinized—but as a re-introduction, it worked brilliantly. Its first three minutes are delivered in a pitched-up approximation of a child's voice, picking apart the hidden motives behind the wants and desires of his subject with a sweetly-concealed irony, as a musical dreamscape gently glides underneath. It serves almost as a lullaby of sorts—which makes the transition to his "real" voice, arriving suddenly for the second verse, that much more effective. "Nikes" proved that Frank Ocean was back, and with a whole new set of emotions to get off his chest."

Pitchfork listed "Nikes" on their ranking of the 100 best songs of 2016 at number 25.

== Music video ==
The music video was released exclusively on Apple Music on August 20, 2016. It explores the concept of duality. Ocean's winged eye shadow evokes a queer aesthetic while the cars symbolize masculinity. While talking about the video in an interview with The Fader, director Tyrone Lebon said; "The visuals came immediately when I first heard the song - they all follow from the music and Frank's lyrics." The video features a cameo appearance from American rapper ASAP Rocky holding a picture of the late ASAP Yams. It also pays tribute to Pimp C and Trayvon Martin. NPR named it as one of the best music videos of 2016.

== Personnel ==
- Frank Ocean – lead vocals, production, arrangement, additional programming
- Malay Ho – production, arrangement, Mellotron, drum programming
- Om'Mas Keith – production, arrangement, drum programming
- Amber Coffman – additional vocals

== Charts ==
Chart (2016)	Peak position
Canada Hot 100 (Billboard)	77
New Zealand Heatseekers (Recorded Music NZ)	3
UK Singles (Official Charts)	93
US Billboard Hot 100	79
US Hot R&B/Hip-Hop Songs (Billboard)	27

== Certifications ==
Region	Certification	Certified units/sales
Denmark (IFPI Danmark)	Gold	45,000^{‡}
New Zealand (RMNZ)	Platinum	30,000^{‡}
United Kingdom (BPI)	Gold	400,000^{‡}
^{‡} Sales+streaming figures based on certification alone.

== Release history ==
Region	Date	Format	Label	Ref.
Various	August 20, 2016	Digital download	Boys Don't Cry	
