= HMV's Poll of Polls =

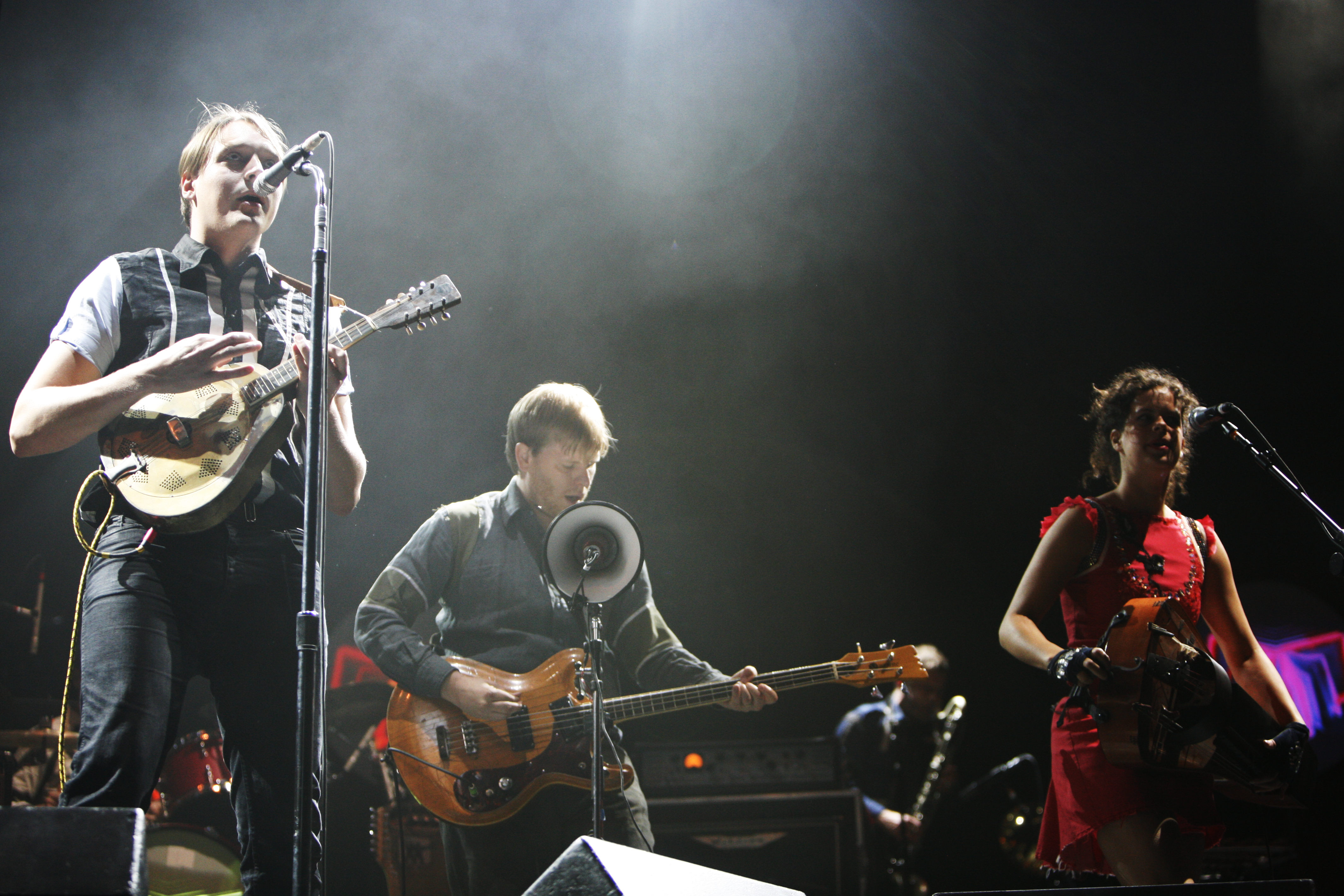
Canadian band Arcade Fire are the only act to have topped the Poll of Polls more than once.

HMV's Poll of Polls was an annual list of albums compiled by British music retailer HMV from 1998 to 2012. The listing was created each December by collating year-end polls from approximately 30 music magazines, newspapers and guides to determine the most critically acclaimed albums of the year. An album's placing in the list was determined by the number of different polls in which it was included. In the event of two records featuring in the same number of polls, the album with the highest combined placings was given the higher position on the Poll of Polls. In 2011, Let England Shake by PJ Harvey was named the best album of the year after receiving 21 nominations – the following year, Channel Orange by Frank Ocean topped the poll with 22 nominations.

The Poll of Polls was introduced by HMV in 1998, with Hello Nasty by American hip hop group Beastie Boys topping the first chart. Thereafter, the poll was aggregated using listings from more than 60 sources, including magazines such as NME and Q, newspapers such as The Guardian and the Daily Mirror, and music blogs, including Gorilla vs. Bear and Stereogum. Subsequent polls were topped by acts such as Daft Punk, Queens of the Stone Age and Kanye West. The only act to top the listing more than once was Canadian band Arcade Fire, who were number one in both 2005 and 2010 with Funeral and The Suburbs respectively.

Commentators observed a disparity between the albums that placed highly in the Poll of Polls and those that were the year's biggest-selling. Speaking about the 2008 chart, singer-songwriter Christopher Rees noted that "when records are so popular in mainstream charts, they lose favour with the critics. The quirkier the sound, the cooler it becomes in their opinion." Similarly, Jonathan Owen of The Independent contrasted the albums that had been featured in 2011's Poll of Polls against those that had sold the most that year in the UK. Although Let England Shake had topped HMV's listing, Owen remarked that "hardly anyone would agree", as Harvey's album had, at the time, sold only 130,000 copies, compared with 3.5 million copies of the year's best-seller, 21 by Adele.

Albums released through independent (indie) record labels often performed well in the poll. In discussion of the 2008 chart, John Rostron of Cardiff's The Point remarked that he had "seen a rise in the quality of independent music and of bands signed to small record labels". The following year, eight of Top 10 albums had been released by indie labels, which HMV claimed underlined "the current strength of Indie music and the vitality of the music scene in general". Three years later, 34 of the 50 albums in the chart were released on independent labels, with six featuring in the Top 10. Speaking in 2009, HMV's Rock & Pop Manager John Hirst stated that it was "encouraging to see indie labels doing so well", and that it reflected on "the vibrant state of [music] right now".

== Number-one albums ==
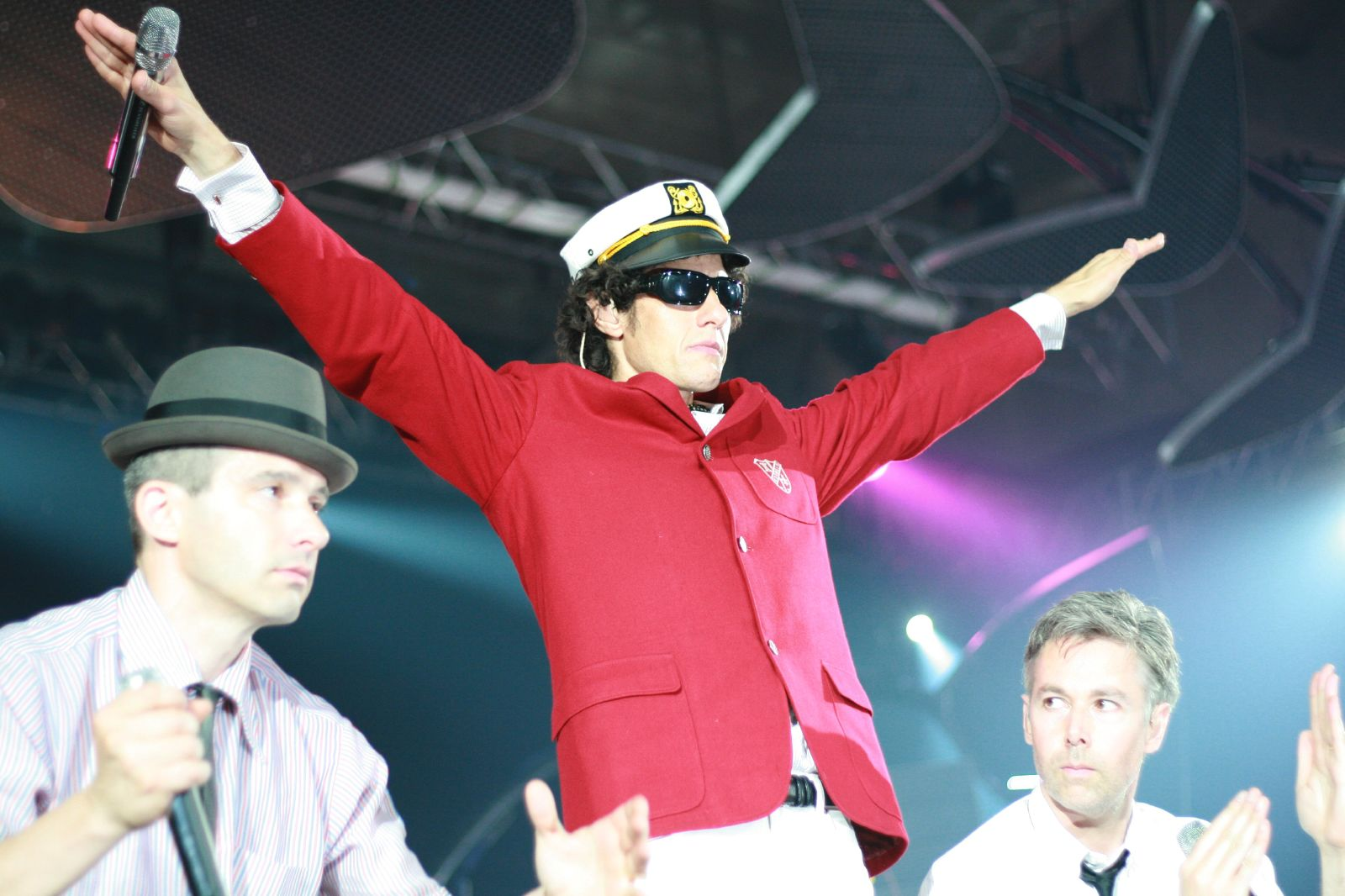
American hip hop group Beastie Boys were the inaugural winners of HMV's Poll of Polls in 1998.

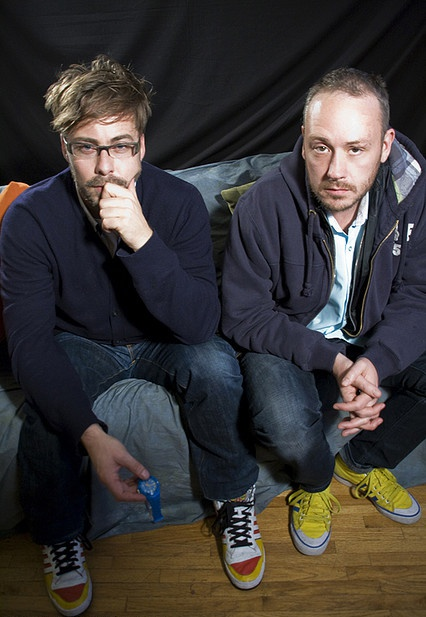
British duo Basement Jaxx topped the poll in 1999 with Remedy, and came third with Rooty in 2001.

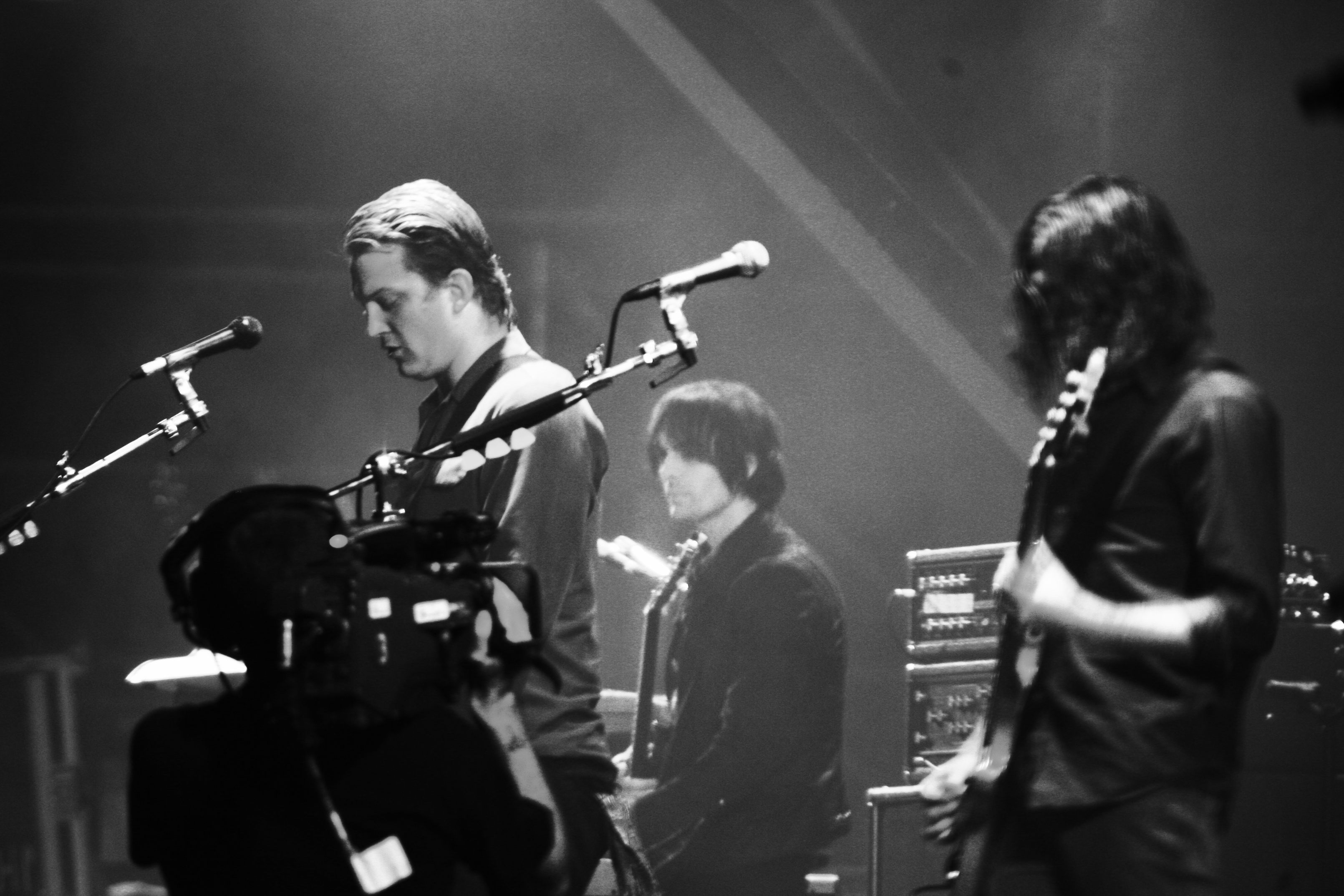
Queens of the Stone Age were number one in 2002 with Songs for the Deaf, and number five in 2000 with Rated R.

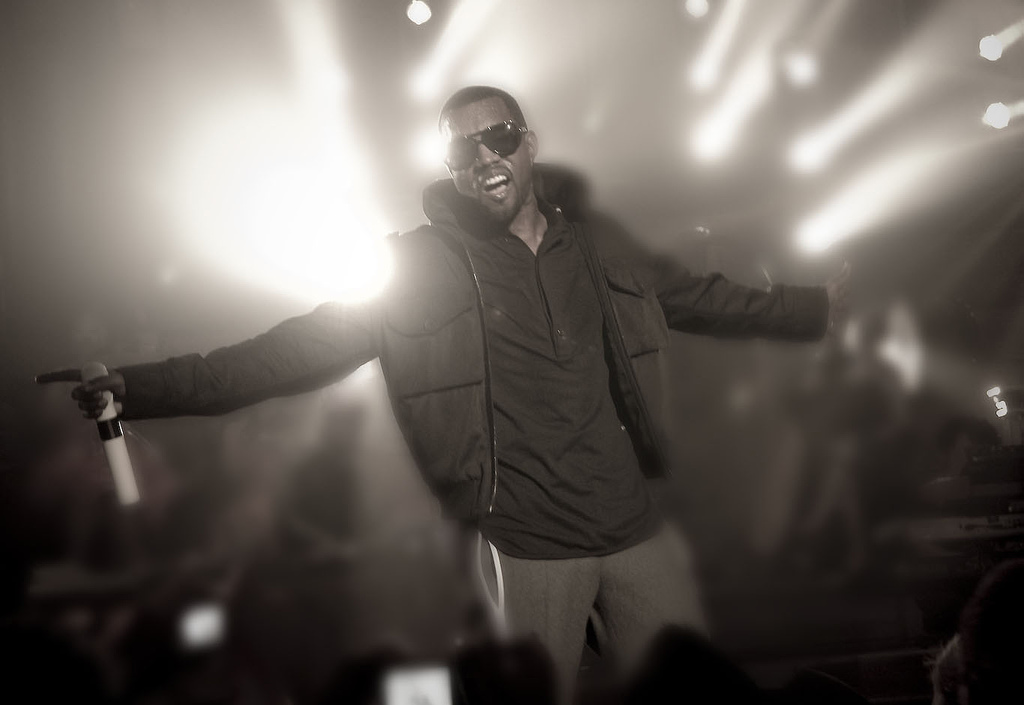
American hip-hop artist Kanye West topped the Poll of Polls with his 2004 debut album The College Dropout, and came third with Late Registration in 2005.

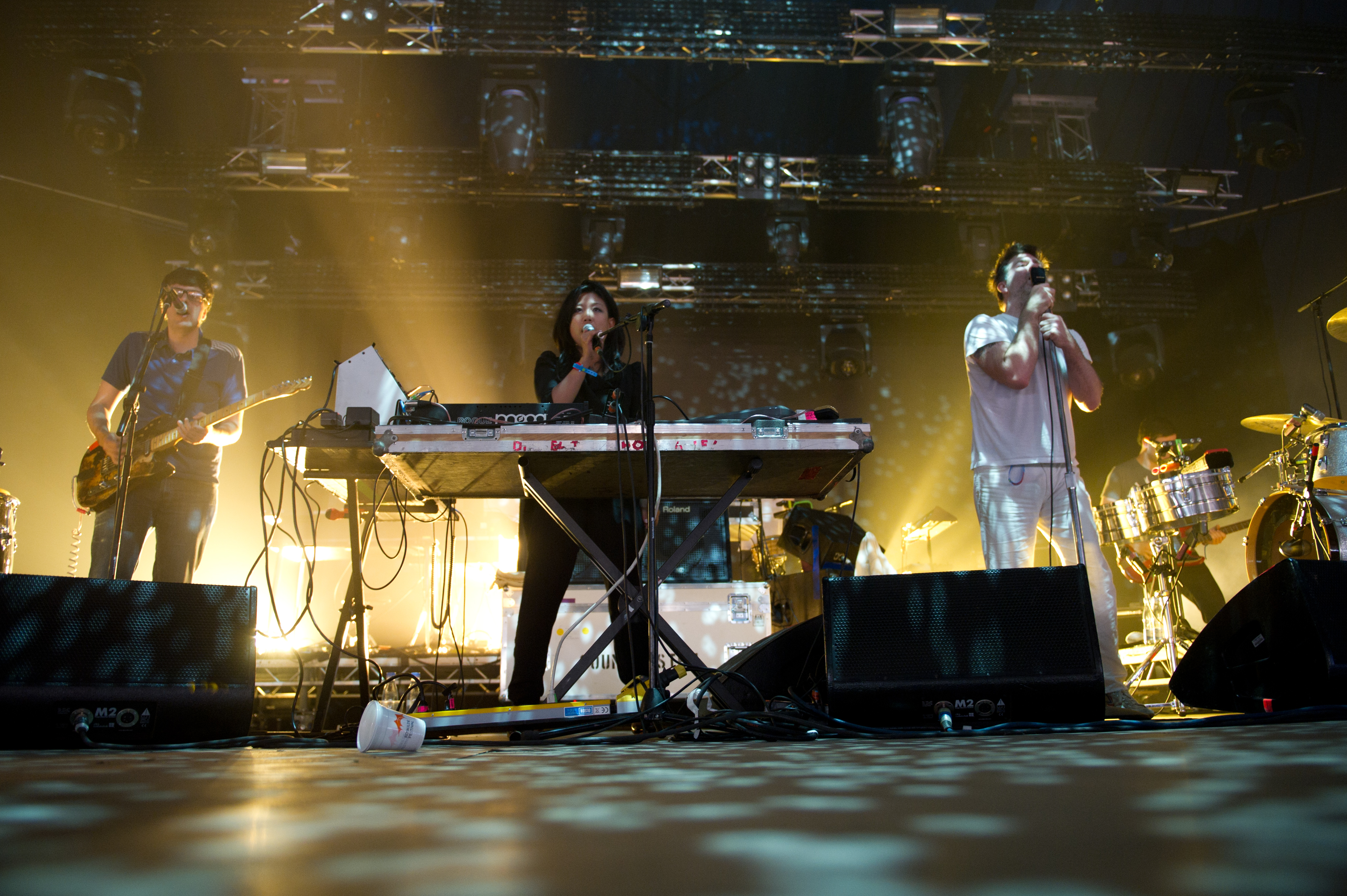
American band LCD Soundsystem were number one on the chart with Sound of Silver in 2007, and number three in 2010 with This is Happening.

Year	Artist	Album	Top five albums	Ref.
1998	Beastie Boys	Hello Nasty	2nd: Air – Moon Safari; 3rd: Massive Attack – Mezzanine; 4th: Gomez – Bring It On; 5th: Lauryn Hill – The Miseducation of Lauryn Hill	
1999	Basement Jaxx	Remedy	2nd: The Chemical Brothers – Surrender; 3rd: Death in Vegas – The Contino Sessions; 4th: The Beta Band – The Beta Band; 5th: Missy Elliott – Da Real World	
2000	Eminem	The Marshall Mathers LP	2nd: Radiohead – Kid A; 3rd: Badly Drawn Boy – The Hour of Bewilderbeast; 4th: Kelis – Kaleidoscope; 5th: Queens of the Stone Age – Rated R	
2001	Daft Punk	Discovery	2nd: The Avalanches – Since I Left You; 3rd: Basement Jaxx – Rooty; 4th: Radiohead – Amnesiac; 5th: Röyksopp – Melody A.M.	
2002	Queens of the Stone Age	Songs for the Deaf	2nd: The Streets – Original Pirate Material; 3rd: The Flaming Lips – Yoshimi Battles the Pink Robots; 4th: Ms. Dynamite – A Little Deeper; 5th: 2 Many DJs/Soulwax – 2 Many DJs	
2003	Outkast	Speakerboxxx/The Love Below	2nd: Dizzee Rascal – Boy in da Corner; 3rd: The Mars Volta – De-Loused in the Comatorium; 4th: The White Stripes – Elephant; 5th: The Darkness – Permission to Land	
2004	Kanye West	The College Dropout	2nd: Scissor Sisters – Scissor Sisters; 3rd: Franz Ferdinand – Franz Ferdinand; 4th: The Streets – A Grand Don't Come for Free; 5th: Nick Cave and the Bad Seeds – Abattoir Blues/The Lyre of Orpheus	
2005	Arcade Fire	Funeral	2nd: Gorillaz – Demon Days; 3rd: Kanye West – Late Registration; 4th: Sufjan Stevens – Illinois; 5th: Elbow – Leaders of the Free World	
2006	Joanna Newsom	Ys	2nd: Hot Chip – The Warning; 3rd: Mastodon – Blood Mountain; 4th: Lily Allen – Alright, Still; 5th: Arctic Monkeys – Whatever People Say I Am, That's What I'm Not	
2007	LCD Soundsystem	Sound of Silver	2nd: M.I.A. – Kala; 3rd: Radiohead – In Rainbows; 4th: Klaxons – Myths of the Near Future; 5th: Battles – Mirrored	
2008	Elbow	The Seldom Seen Kid	2nd: Portishead – Third; 3rd: Nick Cave and the Bad Seeds – Dig, Lazarus, Dig!!!; 4th: Fleet Foxes – Fleet Foxes; 5th: Vampire Weekend – Vampire Weekend	
2009	Animal Collective	Merriweather Post Pavilion	2nd: Yeah Yeah Yeahs – It's Blitz!; 3rd: The xx – xx; 4th: Dirty Projectors – Bitte Orca; 5th: Grizzly Bear – Veckatimest	
2010	Arcade Fire	The Suburbs	2nd: The National – High Violet; 3rd: LCD Soundsystem – This is Happening; 4th: Beach House – Teen Dream; 5th: Janelle Monáe – The ArchAndroid	
2011	PJ Harvey	Let England Shake	2nd: Bon Iver – Bon Iver; 3rd: Fleet Foxes – Helplessness Blues; 4th: Radiohead – The King of Limbs; 5th: Tune-Yards – Whokill	
2012	Frank Ocean	Channel Orange	2nd: Jack White – Blunderbuss; 3rd: Tame Impala – Lonerism; 4th: Grimes – Visions; 5th: Grizzly Bear – Shields	

== Year-end polls used ==
HMV's Poll of Polls used year-end, best-of charts from 30 major UK music magazines, national newspapers, websites and guides. Since its inception in 1998, the chart was collated using data from:

Magazines

- Artrocker
- The Big Issue
- Clash
- Classic Rock
- Decibel
- DJ Mag
- Echoes
- Fact
- Filter
- The Fly
- Gay Times
- GQ
- Hot Press
- iDJ
- Kerrang!
- Magnet
- Melody Maker
- Metal Hammer
- Mixmag
- Mojo
- Music Week
- Muzik
- NME
- Paste
- Q
- The Quietus
- Record Collector
- Rock Sound
- Rolling Stone
- Select
- Spin
- Time
- Time Out
- Uncut
- The Wire (Rewind)
- The Word

Newspapers

- Daily Mail
- Daily Mirror
- Daily Star
- Evening Standard
- The Guardian
- Metro
- Observer Music Monthly
- The Sun
- The Sunday Times
- The Times

Websites and other organisations

- Amazon
- BBC Radio 6 Music
- Digital Spy
- Drowned in Sound
- Get Closer
- Gorilla vs. Bear
- HMV
- Piccadilly Records
- Pitchfork
- Playlouder
- Popbitch
- PopMatters
- Pure Groove
- Rough Trade
- Stereogum
- XFM

== See also ==
- Metacritic – a reviews website that, between 2010 and 2022, also aggregated an annual list of albums from year-end polls
