= Sweet Life (Frank Ocean song) =

2012 single by Frank Ocean

Single by Frank Ocean

from the album channel ORANGE
- Released: July 6, 2012
- Recorded: 2012
- Genre: R&B; neo soul; jazz-funk
- Length: 4:23
- Label: Def Jam
- Songwriters: Christopher Breaux; Pharrell Williams
- Producers: Pharrell Williams; Frank Ocean

Frank Ocean singles chronology
"Pyramids" (2012)	"Sweet Life" (2012)	"Lost" (2012)

"Sweet Life" is a song by American singer Frank Ocean, released as the third single from his debut studio album Channel Orange (2012). The song was written and produced by Ocean and Pharrell Williams, member of the production duo The Neptunes. The track was released on July 6, 2012, when Ocean posted a download of the song onto his Tumblr account, and it debuted on iTunes on July 12. The song features a vocal loop, warm horn sections and lush, tropical production. The song explores a disillusionment and wealth within Ladera Heights and lyrically explores a narrative of people wasting their life away on the beach and Ocean's desire not to involve himself with such a life. The song draws inspiration from Ocean's own early life.

The song received overwhelmingly positive reviews from critics who praised its smooth production and the social commentary in Ocean's lyrics. Some writers described it as a highlight from the album, and its production was widely compared to the work of Stevie Wonder. The track charted on the South Korea Gaon International Chart at position 124. Ocean performed "Sweet Life" during his Channel Orange Tour through North America.

== Background ==
Following the success of Frank Ocean's mixtape Nostalgia, Ultra, it was reported that Ocean was getting calls from several large producers wishing to collaborate with him. The Neptunes' Pharrell Williams was one of the producers who reached out to Ocean, with the two first meeting at the 2011 Coachella Music Festival. In an interview with Vibe in 2011, Williams commented the following on Ocean:

"To me [he’s] a singer/songwriter. But his album itself is incredible. He’s super talented. To me he’s like the Black James Taylor. He’s lyrical—he’s got a great perspective and super sick melodies. I haven’t seen anybody bob and weave through chords with such catchy melodies in a long time—that’s why I liked working with him.”

Ocean accepted Williams' offer, and the two went into the studio to record songs together. After their sessions together, what they had produced was worked sonically into the rest of the album, one of the tracks becoming "Sweet Life". The song draws inspiration from the early life of Ocean, who grew up in New Orleans and who now lives in Beverly Hills. Ocean's hometown of New Orleans was hit by Hurricane Katrina, forcing Ocean to relocate to Beverly Hills. Ocean's early upbringing and experiences with Beverly Hills shaped the themes of the song, such as his dismay with people living intentionally insulated lives. Though Williams co-wrote the song with Ocean, it has been described as deeply personal to Ocean in content. A download for the song was posted onto Ocean's personal Tumblr account on July 6, 2012 in promotion of the album. It was simultaneously posted onto his SoundCloud account. The track was released a few days following Ocean's coming out as a bisexual, which sparked additional interest in the song. Ocean performed the track during his 14 show Channel Orange Tour through North America.

== Composition ==
"Sweet Life"
19 second sample of "Sweet Life" featuring Ocean singing the song's hook over the jazzy, laid back production by Williams.

"Sweet Life" is a smooth R&B track with a 1970s aesthetic. The production was described as similar to the work of Stevie Wonder, with elements of "twinkling Stevie-esque electric piano". It moves between lush jazz-funk and a cappella breakdowns, featuring a massive synth-stoked chorus and scoring similar to that of James Bond end credit theme. The track was described as impressively detailed; containing a below-the-mix vocal loop, warm horns handled by Williams, a perpetually meandering electronic keyboard line. It was noted that it still managed to feel spacious and loose, drawing inspiration from soul songs from the 70's. Live instruments were used during recording, adding a more organic sense to the sound. Ocean makes his vocal presence front center on the track, a move compared to the pomposity of musical choreographer Busby Berkeley, with lyrical influence from Joan Didion and Randy Newman. R&B singer D'Angelo and his album Voodoo was noted as another inspiration. The production was mostly handled by Williams, which has been compared to the type of lush beats found on his recording band's N.E.R.D's albums, notably their debut In Search Of.... The chord progression has been described as signature Williams, serving as a "jazzy sound bed" for Ocean's vocal performance.

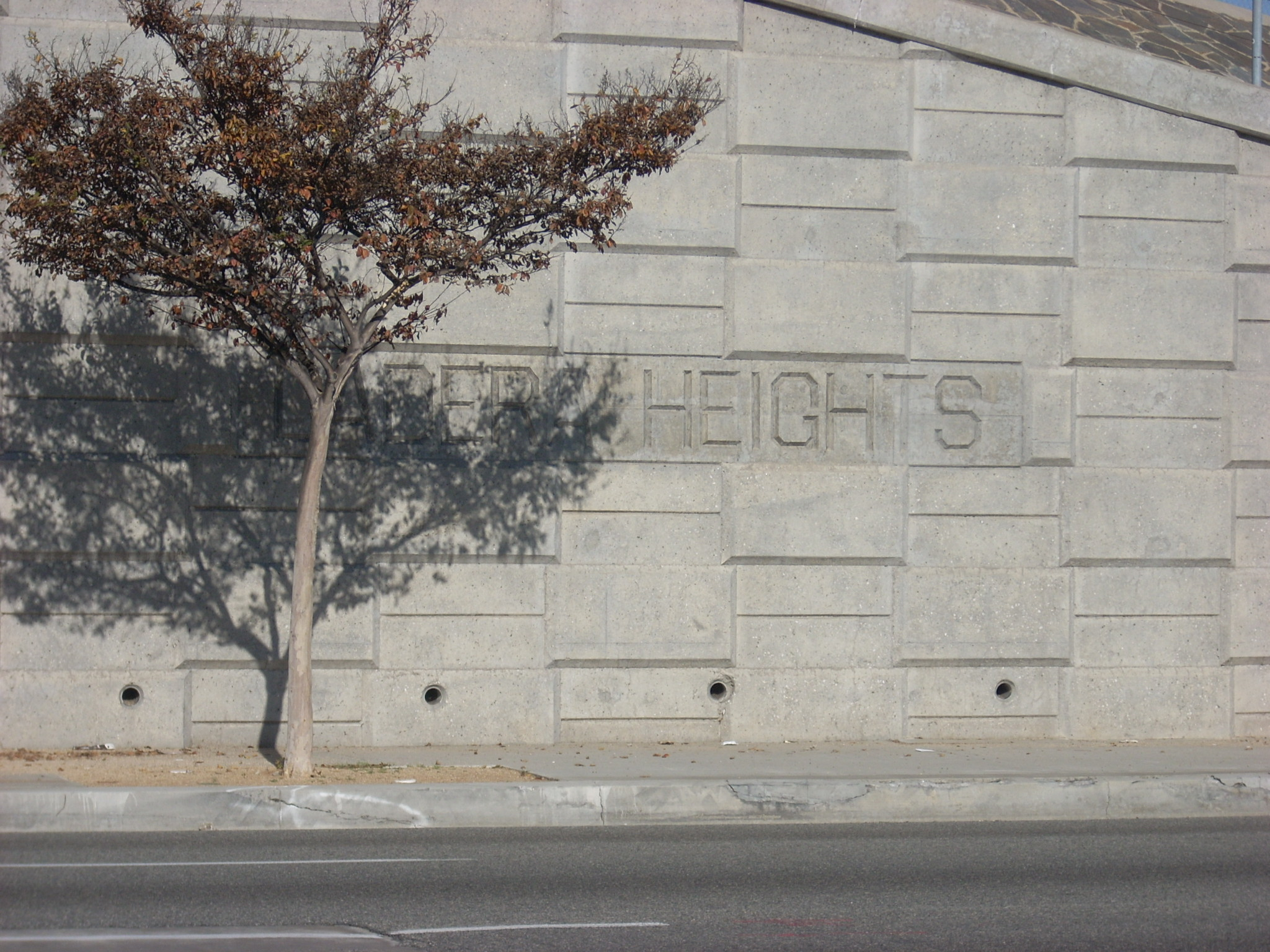
The song draws inspiration from the luxurious surroundings of Ladera Heights, California.

The song is set in Ladera Heights, California, declared as "the black Beverly Hills" by Ocean. Ocean referring it to "the black Beverly Hills also is probably a reference to a scene in the Quentin Tarantino film, Reservoir Dogs. Ocean compares the setting to a domesticated paradise, with palm trees, pools, "whatever feels good". Placed in a tropical setting, Ocean spins a narrative of the finer pleasures of high-class living, and how they can act as blinders to life's expansiveness, with lines such as "you've had a landscaper and a housekeeper since you were born". "Sweet Life" paints a picture of nightmarish disillusionment within the lives of rich people, critiquing their lives as restless and dangerous in nature. Along with Channel Orange track "Super Rich Kids", "Sweet Life" is a commentary of aimless, money obsessed teenagers, with parallels of Bret Easton Ellis's Less than Zero. The track, much like most of Channel Orange, tells a story about seeming alienation, while also making an argument for the ways in which alienation is humorous, pathetic and at times tender. Ocean's humor is used as a veil for frustration and regret, using irony to pinpoint the absurdity in things. The composition presents a struggle by Ocean to avoid the fripperies of wealth, and serves as a "haunting meditation" on how money makes living well possible, while also noting the downsides it offers.

The track has drawn comparisons to the style of 808s & Heartbreak, a studio album by rapper Kanye West noted for its jarring use of auto-tune. West has often been noted as an influence by Ocean. Ology writer Terron R. Moore mused that unlike West, Ocean was "an inherently sad guy" and that feeling of inner loss and hopelessness appears on every track on the album, even when he's supposed to be singing about the "Sweet Life". He noted a hidden sense of despair on the song, not immediately apparent on first listen. The song also contains parallels to Ocean's own musical career, where Ocean recognizes that an album is much like a relationship: "the main track, the single, often is not the best choice." While singles are generally regarded as an album's best song, Ocean remarks that sometimes the most obvious decision holds more subtly. Jason Lipshutz of Billboard mused that Ocean took on the role of a "captain" on the track, prodding the privileged to reach for more by unraveling their lavish realities; "Why see the world, when you got the beach?" he asks rhetorically. Robert Everett-Green of The Globe and Mail stated that the track depicts dislocated lives of easy pleasure, of "keepin’ it surreal" with pills and sunshine, in music that’s supposedly all about feeling good.

== Reception ==
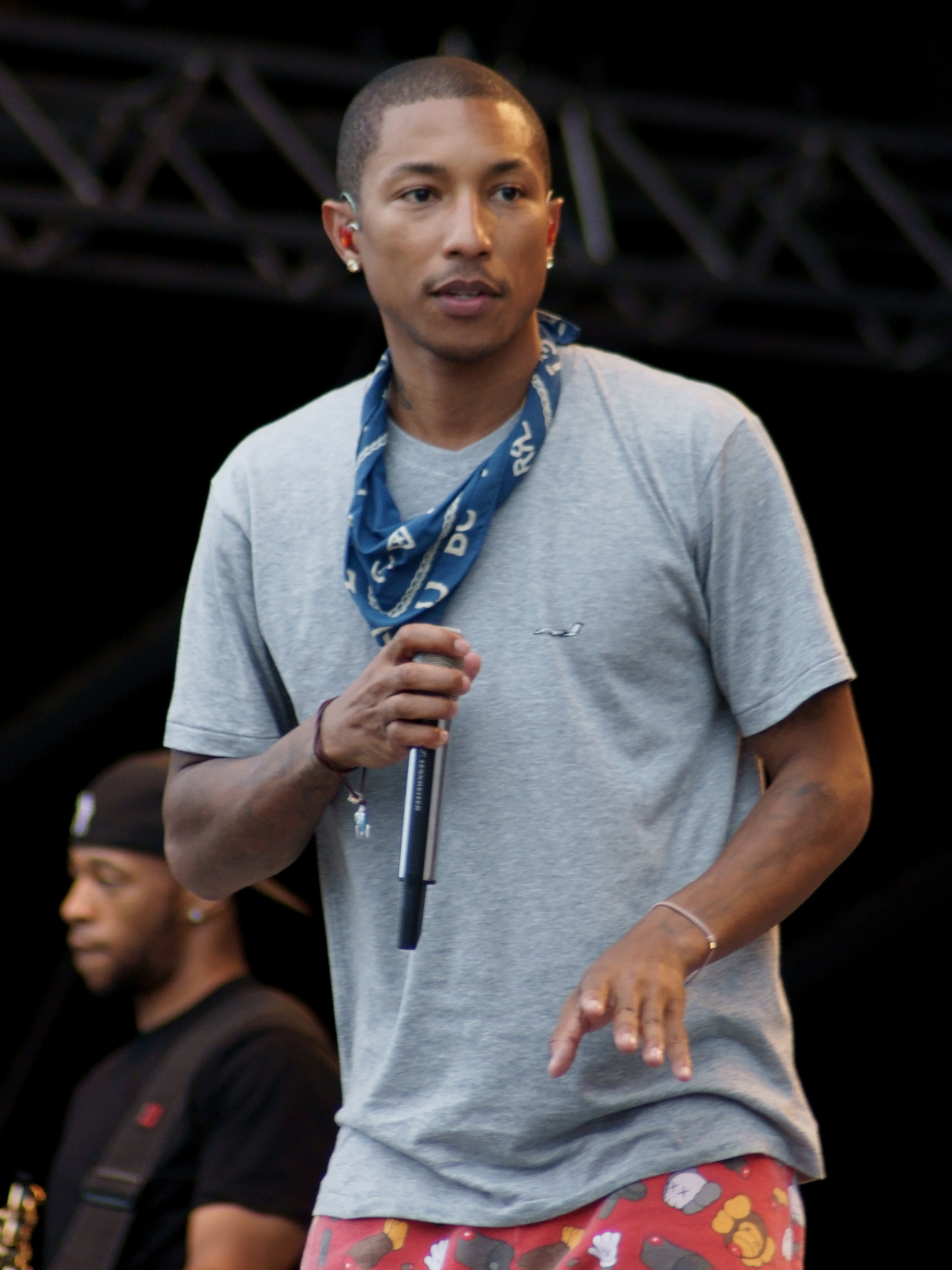
The production by Pharrell Williams was widely praised by critics.

"Sweet Life" was highly praised by music critics. John Calvert of The Quietus described the song as "really big. Like R. Kelly's "I Believe I Can Fly" big. Like Superman eating a super hotdog while fighting King Kong while...ok you get the picture. If you were looking around for a high concept pitch-style descriptor, with its synth brass and Philly strings you might call it 'Stevie Wonder meets N.E.R.D in space'. But then that would be too simplistic a definition for the multifaceted, resolutely accomplished 'Sweet Thing'." Pitchfork's Larry Fitzmaurice labeled it a "Best New Track" and noted that "this was a week where Frank Ocean bravely invited us to learn more about his personal story; 'Sweet Life' is another reminder of how well he can structure a narrative in the musical realm." The Telegraph's Neil McCormick noted that Ocean took the R&B genre and pushed it out into strange new places, with tracks like the "blissful, jazzy jigsaw of 'Sweet Life', which seems to assemble itself from disconnected elements as it goes along." AllMusic's Andy Kellman mused that the track served as one of the album's lighter moments, and wrote that "the bright 'Sweet Life' and the relatively exuberant 'Monks,' both of which would be standouts on any N.E.R.D. album, offer more than bright coating, dealing in surrealism and sharp observations that are equally penetrating."

Greg Kot, writer for the Chicago Tribune, stated that the track "seduces like a drug dealer", with Ocean crooning over a laid-back rhythm. Prefix Magazine's David Padula commented that it "centers around a jazzy keyboard lick that dips regularly into more lush surroundings. The crisp percussion is a highlight, but the winning point is the ful croons and general smoothness of Ocean." Mike Powell's Spin praised Ocean's writing abilities, musing "my 'TV ain't HD, that's too real', the narrator of 'Sweet Life' complains, then returns to his swimming-pool floatie. If the song wasn't so pretty — Ocean's velvety voice, soft jazzy accompaniment — you might even feel bad for him." Killian Fox of The Observer reported that the song was one of the few times on the album when Ocean was actively courting heavy radio play, describing "Sweet Life" as a "near-perfect distillation of every blissed-out summer jam from Stevie Wonder onwards." Amy Dawson, critic for Metro, called the composition "an irresistibly warm slice of old-school funk."

musicOMH's Laurence Green praised "Sweet Life", commenting, "and sweet it is, a joyous affirmation to living life with eyes open wide, soaking up the experiences of youth." Consequence of Sound's Harley Brown felt that Ocean did an uncanny impression of Stevie Wonder, and placed the song amongst Channel Orange's essential tracks. Nathan Slavik of the DJBooth called the vocals "appropriately sweet, softly painting a picture of a life lived in the black Beverly Hills", and commented "just in time for the weekend, expect to hear this one played at pool side barbecues nationwide." The Huffington Post's Alan Pyke called it one of the album's standout tracks, writing that the "bubbling keys and bass" of the track "show how captivating beats elevate Frank Ocean to best-in-class status", praising the production by Williams. Aidin Vaziri of the San Francisco Chronicle listed the song as one of the "swoon worthy" tracks off the album, and felt that Ocean "managed to evoke the carefree feeling of Saturday mornings in front of the television watching Train. The track charted on the South Korea Gaon International Chart at number 124.

== Charts ==
Chart (2012)	Peak position
South Korea Gaon International Chart	124

== Certifications ==
Region	Certification	Certified units/sales
Australia (ARIA)	Gold	35,000^{‡}
New Zealand (RMNZ)	Gold	15,000^{‡}
United Kingdom (BPI)	Silver	200,000^{‡}
^{‡} Sales+streaming figures based on certification alone.
