= Pyramids (song) =

2012 single by Frank Ocean

Single by Frank Ocean

from the album Channel Orange
- Released: June 7, 2012
- Recorded: 2012
- Genre: Electro house; funk; progressive soul; psychedelic soul; R&B
- Length: 9:53
- Label: Def Jam
- Songwriters: Christopher Francis Ocean; James Ryan Ho
- Producers: Frank Ocean; Malay; Om'Mas Keith

Frank Ocean singles chronology
"Thinkin Bout You" (2012)	"Pyramids" (2012)	"Sweet Life" (2012)

Music video
- "Pyramids" on Vimeo

"Pyramids" is a song by American singer Frank Ocean, released as the second single from his debut studio album Channel Orange (2012). The song was written by Ocean and produced by Malay and Om'Mas Keith. The track features an uncredited guitar solo from singer and guitarist John Mayer. On June 7, 2012, Ocean posted a small teaser video featuring a snippet of the song onto his Tumblr account, and released the full, nearly 10-minute song later that day onto his official SoundCloud account.

The song explores a narrative of a pimp falling in love with one of his sex workers. Lyrically, the track contains several extended metaphors referencing Cleopatra, pyramids, strip clubs and luxury. The song received highly positive reviews and was called epic in nature by several publications, who praised the ambition and scope of the track's length, along with the lyrical merit.

The song was featured in a teaser for Ocean's then-upcoming album and was released with a cover that featured The Simpsons style characters. The music video was directed by Nabil Elderkin and featured an orange car with an atmospheric background. The song has since debuted on the UK R&B Chart at number 31. The track has been featured during television promos for Channel Orange. Ocean performed "Pyramids" during his Channel Orange tour through North America.

== Background ==
On June 8, 2012, Frank Ocean posted on his Tumblr a cryptic, almost two-minute video, promoting an unknown project which was titled Channel Orange. The clip featured an expensive-looking car, and it also contained new music. Later that day Ocean posted the full song used in the video, titled "Pyramids" onto his SoundCloud account. Popdust noted that "trailers won’t tell you everything. For example, the brief snippet of Frank Ocean’s new track ‘Pyramids’ heard in an ambiguous trailer a few days ago left out one key detail of the track: the damn thing is 10 minutes long." The cover artwork for the single features sexual The Simpsons characters.

The song was Ocean's first single in over a year, which was described as him coming "back into the spotlight in a huge way." The track was labeled indicating that it was to be the ninth track on the album. It was later announced that the Channel Orange project was actually his debut album and would launch a corresponding tour. The release of the album's track list confirmed both the track placement of the track and the appearance of it on the album. "Pyramids" serves as the second single from the project following "Thinkin Bout You". The following day Ocean posted that, "playing ‘Pyramids’ on the road is gonna be my favourite part" on his Twitter account, speaking about his promotional tour.

== Composition ==
"Pyramids"
28 second sample of "Pyramids" featuring Ocean singing about Cleopatra with the smooth production playing.

"Pyramids" is an R&B song that lasts 9 minutes and 54 seconds. It has been described as a "nearly 10-minute epic that touches on everything from club music to good old-fashioned slow jam R&B" and is "an ambitious song with multiple movements." The song features groaning club beats, psychedelic guitar noodling, crunchy synth leads, a funked-up beat, and "Ocean's distinctive croon and lots of vague new-R&B angst". The opening segment sports the "beautiful, warped R&B that Ocean has become known for", but from there the song transitions into a smattering of electro-house synths, Michael Jackson-influenced pop melodies, spaced out electronic segues, UK bass breaks, saxophone, and guitar solo courtesy of John Mayer." The track is an "R&B odyssey" slinking from ancient Egypt, where wild cheetahs are on the loose and Cleopatra meets a "snakey doom", to the present day where "Frank is living that sleazy motel room life." It serves as "another case where the production far outstrips the vocal work", with "clanging and chiming and choirs for the intro," a dance break toward the middle that sounds like it was "recorded in 2018", and a slow jam for the second half that closes the song.

The chorus talks about a woman “working at the pyramid tonight”. The track lyrically features intricate imagery that depicts a fantasy-like scenario, and the length gives the song the ability to change tempo with "patience, with suave, like a furthering of the foreplay". The first half details an account of ancient history, "even your junior high school social studies teacher would blush over", with the second half containing a narrative where Ocean serves as Cleopatra's pimp but through years of working together, he eventually falls in love with her. Through the "unwritten bylaws of their profession", however, his love is no match for the "rules of the game which were established long before he or she rose to power." The narrative of "Pyramids" was inspired by real events in Ocean's life. When the singer lived in Los Angeles, he lived alongside pimps, and in an interview the singer mused that "it was fantasy built off that dynamic … but you can only write what you know to a point." The storytelling scope of the song has been compared favorably to Bob Dylan's "Hurricane", and has been described as an anthem "for the Drake generation."

It was reported that Ocean was stretching the limits of the term "song" on "Pyramids", and that there are "more ideas on this track than on most albums". The single runs the gamut of Ocean's various influences, pulling from European electronic dance music and Prince's early 80s discography, notably Purple Rain. The moody tune finds Ocean moaning over ethereal swirls and pulses while cooing about "working at the pyramid" and finding "my Black queen Cleopatra." It entails a multitude of "suites and a kaleidoscope of moods and tones" from "vainglorious to melancholic" and has been called the "Paranoid Android" of R&B. Although Ocean is often labeled as an R&B artist, he has "entirely steered clear of confining himself to one genre" with the song.

== Reception ==
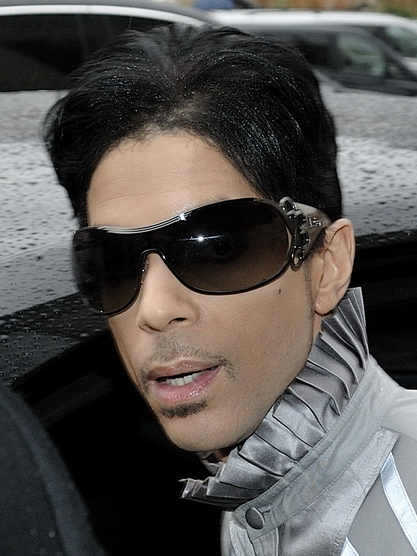
The song has drawn comparisons to the work of musician Prince.

"Pyramids" was received with universal acclaim from music critics. Complex Magazine named it track "song of the week" upon release. Complex later named the song the fourth best song of 2012. Siân Rowe of NME compared the track to Prince's "Purple Rain" and reported that the song "is the kind of track you’ll lose hours and hours of your life to. This week alone, NME has spent at least two days having our minds freaked on by its space funk swirl." Pitchfork's Evan Minsker labeled it a "Best New Track" and wrote that "the song's a 10-minute R&B event, traveling from club banger ancient Egypt ('send the cheetahs to the tomb') to the slow jam strip club ('she's workin' at the Pyramid tonight'). It's a journey well-suited to Ocean's smooth croon." The publication's Ryan Dombal commented, "essentially reincarnates one of the most storied female rulers in history as a six-inch-heeled woman of the night. However, the song doesn't read as an indictment of the last 2,000 years as much as yet another attempt to cleverly level the playing field." The Telegraph's Neil McCormick stated that the track was the "real miracle of the album", noting that while Ocean "can embark on something as flamboyant as 'Pyramids' - a 10-minute, tempo-shifting, minor-chord narrative of Egyptian queens and Las Vegas strippers, marrying Tangerine Dream sequencers and a jazzy John Mayer guitar solo to a rapturous slow jam – and make it all seem to make sense."

Melissa Locker of Time called it a "tour de force" and "a ten-minute history of R&B, arcing from club thumping beats to a sultry drawn out jam with Ocean's voice veering from a velvety croon to an endearingly creaky falsetto." Spin's Marc Hogan declared "this much is clear: Ocean continues to deliver songs that combine the narrative punch of a great singer-songwriter with the stylish flair of contemporary hip-hop." John Hall of The Independent described the song as more new material from the "hardest-working man in hip hop" and that the "10-minute single works its way through every genre of contemporary pop, from club banger to slow jam." Nathan S. of the DJBooth described the song as a sprawling affair, noting that it contains "hazy and ambient cut that manages to weave in soaring guitars and ‘90s funk synths." Alexis Petridis of The Guardian mused that the track seemed ambitious to the point of sounding slightly daft, and that the track was "certainly unlike anything else in current R&B." PopMatters's Brice Ezell stated that all it takes is one listen to 'Pyramids', the shape-shifting opus of channel ORANGE to cement Ocean's status as one of contemporary R&B's vital songwriters.

John Calvert of The Quietus called "Pyramids" a little "structurally ramshackle though never erratic, it's the type of massive album centrepiece that was inconceivable before The-Dream's stadium-R&B reinvented the genre as a mythological epic." Paley Martin of Most Blunted stated that the track "is so much more than a song; it is an audible baptism, a narrative delicacy, a self-indulgent experience! And you best believe once you press play, this ride will take you to the destination of your choice." Jason Lipshutz of Billboard felt that the real triumph was Ocean's song structure: "verses and hooks collapse onto each other, rhymes pop up out of nowhere, and the singer acts like minutely balancing a 10-minute concept piece is no big deal." Chris Richards of The Washington Post described the track as a "righteous funk opus that spans nearly 10 minutes", commented that it "is loaded with metaphorical riddles, drawing parallels between Cleopatra and a 21st-century prostitute. Puzzle over it. Dance to it. All of the above."

Ocean's Odd Future cohort Tyler, The Creator called it his favorite Ocean song on his Twitter account. The song has over one million plays on Ocean's official SoundCloud account, where the song was released.

In 2012, The Village Voice's Pazz & Jop annual critics' poll ranked "Pyramids" at number 10; Ocean's previous single, "Thinkin Bout You" charted at number four on the same poll.

== Promotion ==
When "Pyramids" was first released, it debuted within a promotional video less than two minutes long. The clip consists of an extended shot of a car, which flickers slightly with "otherworldly effects" while a "slinky soul tune plays in the background." The video was directed by Nabil Elderkin, who also helmed the music videos for past Ocean singles such as "Swim Good" and "Novacane". A portion of the song was used during television commercials advertising Channel Orange, which began airing following the 2012 BET Awards. Siân Rowe of NME mused that the song will definitely get an outing on his upcoming US tour; "Imagine lots of dry ice, a velvet-covered rotating stage and the entire front row sighing, 'I love you, Frank', what a beautiful sight." Ocean performed the track during his 14 show Channel Orange Tour through North America.

== Music video ==
An extended, eight-minute video for "Pyramids", also directed by Elderkin, was later released on September 8, 2012. The video follows a loose narrative, with stream-of-consciousness scenes, and utilizes several songs from Ocean's album channel ORANGE.

It begins with Ocean drinking four shots of absinthe at a bar, before opening fire upon the bar itself; a segment of "Pink Matter" plays during this portion. A title card appears as Ocean boards his motorcycle (the song "Start" appears.) As he rides off into the desert, a snippet of the first half of "Pyramids" plays before transitioning directly into the second half. Shots of Ocean singing on his motorbike are interspersed with slow-motion scenes of Ocean walking through a strip club in a hallucinogenic haze, occasionally bursting into laughter; the club employs vampy women. Ocean is then seen in front of a large neon triangle with the Kabbalahian Tree of Life in neon upon it, from which John Mayer emerges and performs an entirely new guitar solo exclusive to the video. James Montgomery of MTV News characterizes the scene as an inadvertent "vision quest". Ocean falls down backwards, instantly re-appearing in the desert as a plane flies overhead. The song "End" appears as Ocean walks back to his motorcycle, picks up his helmet and walks down the highway towards a pyramid in the distance.

== Charts ==
Chart (2012)	Peak position
Belgium (Ultratip Bubbling Under Flanders)	24
Belgium (Ultratop Flanders Urban)	41
UK Singles (The Official Charts Company)	129
UK R&B (Official Charts Company)	21
US Bubbling Under R&B/Hip-Hop Singles (Billboard)	3
US Hot R&B Songs (Billboard)	22

== Certifications ==
Region	Certification	Certified units/sales
Australia (ARIA)	Platinum	70,000^{‡}
Denmark (IFPI Danmark)	Platinum	90,000^{‡}
New Zealand (RMNZ)	2× Platinum	60,000^{‡}
United Kingdom (BPI)	Platinum	600,000^{‡}
United States (RIAA)	Gold	500,000^{‡}
Streaming
Denmark (IFPI Danmark)	Gold	900,000^{†}
^{‡} Sales+streaming figures based on certification alone.^{†} Streaming-only figures based on certification alone.

== Remixes and cover versions ==
On September 4, 2012, record producer Chi Duly released "Pyramids (Chi Duly Remix)", an uptempo nu-disco version. In 2021, Apple Music remastered the track to the Dolby Atmos surround sound format.
