= Play It by Heart =

Play It by Heart...

Studio album by Jay James Picton
- Released: 27 August 2012
- Genres: Funk; soul; pop
- Label: Decca Records

Play It by Heart (stylised as Play it by heart...) is the debut studio album by Welsh singer songwriter Jay James Picton. It was released on 6 August 2012 through Decca Records. He was signed to Universal Music.

On a shortened name Jay James, two years later, in 2014, he took part in series 11 of the UK The X Factor.

== Track listing ==
1. "Another Man" (intro)
2. "Long May They Roll"
3. "Play It by Heart"
4. "Nothing at All"
5. "Gravity"
6. "Almost You"
7. "You're the Sea"
8. "Spiders"
9. "Heads vs Hearts" (featuring Booker T. Jones)
10. "Sunshine"
11. "Gone"
12. "Someone That's Real"
13. "Oh There She Goes"
14. "Closing Time" (bonus)
15. "The Boy That Wants to Fly" (bonus)
