= I Never Loved You =

2024 single by Halsey

Single by Halsey

from the album The Great Impersonator
- Released: October 10, 2024
- Genre: Pop
- Length: 4:09
- Label: Columbia
- Songwriters: Halsey; Michael Uzowuru
- Producers: Michael Uzowuru; Tyler Johnson

Halsey singles chronology
"Ego" (2024)	"I Never Loved You" (2024)	"Safeword" (2025)

Audio video
- "I Never Loved You" on YouTube

"I Never Loved You" is a song by the American singer Halsey from her fifth studio album, The Great Impersonator (2024). She wrote it along with Michael Uzowuru, while the latter produced it with Tyler Johnson. Columbia Records released the song on October 10, 2024, as the album's fourth single. "I Never Loved You" is a 1980s-tinged pop ballad inspired by the English singer-songwriter Kate Bush, whom Halsey impersonated as part of its promotion. On its lyrics, Halsey expresses about a complicated relationship which was deteriorated by her medical issues, a recurrent theme in The Great Impersonator.

== Background and release ==
On August 27, 2024, Halsey shared a trailer for her fifth studio album, The Great Impersonator, a "confessional concept album" that sees her jump through different decades with the sound of the tracks. On September 25, she posted a video revealing its track listing, in which "I Never Loved You" appears as the tenth track. Since then, she started a countdown on social media for the album's release, with her impersonating a different singer every day and teasing a snippet of the song they inspired. On October 9, she dressed up as the English singer-songwriter Kate Bush and shared a snippet of the song "I Never Loved You", while announcing she would be releasing it as the fourth single from the record on that night, following "Lucky", "Lonely Is the Muse", and "Ego". In a social media post, she said that the song "cuts deep" and encouraged her fans to "listen closely" to it.

== Composition ==
Halsey wrote "I Never Loved You" along with Michael Uzowuru, while the latter produced it with Tyler Johnson. With a length of four minutes and nine seconds, it is a 1980s-inspired pop ballad, led by synthesizers and piano chords. On its lyrics, Halsey expresses about a complicated relationship which was deteriorated by her health issues, comparing its ending to open-heart surgery. The verses of the song focus on Halsey's medical issues, a lupus and T cell deficiency diagnose that she shared with her fans over the course of the singles from The Great Impersonator. Via Genius, Halsey also sent a message to her fans upon the song's release: "A woman lies ill-fated in an Emergency Room. She's holding on with all her might, in hopes her lover will show to say goodbye. He arrives, too late and defensive. Who was driving the car that hit her?".

== Reception ==
Upon its release, Rolling Stone included "I Never Loved You" on its list of the Best New Music of the week. Riff Magazine's Mike DeWald opined that "I Never Loved You" offers "pointed lyricism and intimate balladry". In a The Great Impersonator review, the Stereogum critic Katherine St. Asaph did not find similarities between "I Never Loved You" and Bush, although opined that the background vocals were reminiscent of those from the Trio Bulgarka on The Sensual World (1989).
