= For My Last Trick: The Tour =

2025 concert tour by Halsey

- Tour by Halsey
- Location: North America
- Associated album: The Great Impersonator
- Start date: May 10, 2025
- End date: July 6, 2025
- Legs: 1
- No. of shows: 30
- Supporting acts: Alvvays; Alemeda; Del Water Gap; Evanescence; Flowerovlove; Hope Tala; Julia Wolf; Magdalena Bay; Royel Otis; Sir Chloe; The Warning

Halsey concert chronology
- Love and Power Tour (2022–2023); For My Last Trick: The Tour (2025); Back to Badlands Tour (2025–2026)

For My Last Trick: The Tour was the fifth headlining concert tour by American singer Halsey, in support of her (Note: Halsey uses both she/her and they/them pronouns and switches between them; this article uses she/her pronouns for consistency.) fifth studio album, The Great Impersonator (2024). The tour began in Concord on May 10, 2025, and concluded in Highland on July 6, 2025.

== Background ==
Halsey announced the tour on February 13, 2025, with 32 shows across North America spanning from May through July 2025. Alvvays, Alemeda, Del Water Gap, Evanescence, Flowerovlove, Hope Tala, Julia Wolf, Magdalena Bay, Royel Otis, Sir Chloe and The Warning all supported Halsey throughout various shows on the tour. Tickets went on sale on February 21, with various presales that ran from February 19 to 20. On July 21, 2025, Halsey announced that the Istanbul date which was previous scheduled to happen on August 21, 2025, will now commence on August 28, 2025. Halsey mentioned that the entire production will be happening in Istanbul and it will also be professionally filmed as well. The concert was later cancelled for logistical reasons on August 14, 2025.

== Set list ==
The following set list is obtained from the May 10, 2025, show in Concord. It is not intended to represent all dates throughout the tour.

1. "Alice Falls Down the Rabbit Hole" (intro)
2. "Darwinism"
3. I Wanna Be Big!" (interlude)
4. "Bad at Love"
5. "Alone"
6. "Lucky"
7. "Alice Is Too Big" (interlude)
8. "Dog Years"
9. "I Am Not a Woman, I'm a God"
10. "Control"
11. "Alice Is Too Small" (interlude)
12. "Lilith"
13. "Angel on Fire"
14. "Arsonist"
15. "Alice Has Had Enough" (interlude)
16. "Panic Attack"
17. "Graveyard"
18. "Only Living Girl in LA"
19. "Alice Wake Up" (interlude) (contains elements of "Good Mourning" and "Lie")
20. "Lonely Is the Muse"
21. "You Should Be Sad"
22. "Colors"
23. "Closer" (contains elements of "Experiment on Me")
24. Surprise song
25. "Gasoline"
26. "Alice of the Upper Class"
  Encore
27. "Nightmare"
28. "Without Me"
29. "The Great Impersonator"

=== Alterations ===
- During the show in Los Angeles, Amy Lee joined Halsey onstage to perform "Hand That Feeds".
- During the show in Nashville, Lee once again joined Halsey on stage for a performance of "Hand That Feeds", this performance taking the place of "Closer". "Alice Of The Upper Class" was also not performed.
- During the show in Alpharetta, Halsey switched Closer and Colors and played Nightmare as part of the second act. In place of Nightmare in the encore, she played "I Never Loved You".

=== Surprise songs ===
Halsey performed one surprise song from her discography at each show after "Closer".

- May 10, 2025 — Concord: "Drive"
- May 12, 2025 — Phoenix: "Hurricane"
- May 14, 2025 — Los Angeles: "Drive"
- May 17, 2025 — Dallas: "Hold Me Down"
- May 21, 2025 — Nashville: "Ego"
- May 22, 2025 — Alpharetta: "You Asked for This"
- May 24, 2025 — Tampa: "Hurricane"
- May 25, 2025 — Hollywood: "The Lighthouse"
- May 28, 2025 — Charlotte: "Hold Me Down", “3AM”, “Is There Somewhere”
- May 29, 2025 — Raleigh: "Heaven In Hiding", "100 Letters", "The Lighthouse", "Easier Than Lying"
- June 1, 2025 — Wantagh: "Castle"
- June 3, 2025 — Mansfield: "Roman Holiday"
- June 7, 2025 — Camden: "3AM", "Safeword", "Is There Somewhere"
- June 10, 2025 — Toronto: "Lie", "1121" (demo), "Experiment on Me", "Is There Somewhere"
- June 13, 2025 — Cuyahoga Falls: "Haunting"
- June 14, 2025 — Burgettstown: "The Lighthouse", "Killing Boys", "Roman Holiday", Running Up That Hill (Kate Bush cover)
- June 17, 2025 — Chicago: "The Tradition", "Castle", "3AM", "Strangers" (with Lauren Jauregui)
- June 18, 2025 — Maryland Heights: "Hopeless", "Is There Somewhere"
- June 20, 2025 — Somerset: "3AM", "Now or Never", "Walls Could Talk", "929"
- June 22, 2025 — Morrison: "Roman Holiday", "Young God", "Life of the Spider"
- June 24, 2025 — Salt Lake City: "Haunting", "Is There Somewhere", "Carry the Weight"
- June 26, 2025 — Ridgefield: "Lucid", "Carry the Weight"
- June 28, 2025 — Auburn: "Bells in Santa Fe", "Lucid", "Carry the Weight", "Is There Somewhere", "The End"

== Tour dates ==
List of 2025 concerts, showing date, city, country, venue, opening acts, attendance and gross revenue
Date (2025)	City	Country	Venue	Opening act(s)	Attendance	Revenue
May 10	Concord	United States	Toyota Pavilion at Concord	Del Water Gap; The Warning	11,103 / 11,103	$541,037
May 12	Phoenix	United States	Talking Stick Resort Amphitheatre	Del Water Gap; The Warning	10,276 / 17,998	$497,520
May 14	Los Angeles	United States	Hollywood Bowl	Evanescence; The Warning	16,016 / 17,259	$1,422,229
May 17	Dallas	United States	Dos Equis Pavilion	Del Water Gap; The Warning	11,681 / 19,424	$601,171
May 18	Durant	United States	Choctaw Grand Theater	The Warning	2,896 / 3,000	$156,384
May 21	Nashville	United States	Ascend Amphitheater	Julia Wolf; The Warning	6,792 / 6,792	$320,818
May 22	Alpharetta	United States	Ameris Bank Amphitheatre	Alvvays; The Warning	—	—
May 24	Tampa	United States	MidFlorida Credit Union Amphitheatre	Alvvays; The Warning	—	—
May 25	Hollywood	United States	Hard Rock Live	Alvvays; The Warning	—	—
May 28	Charlotte	United States	PNC Music Pavilion	Alvvays; Hope Tala	—	—
May 29	Raleigh	United States	Coastal Credit Union Music Park	Alvvays; Hope Tala	—	—
May 31	Bristow	United States	Jiffy Lube Live	Alvvays; Hope Tala	—	—
June 1	Wantagh	United States	Jones Beach Theater	Alvvays; Hope Tala	—	—
June 3	Mansfield	United States	Xfinity Center	Alvvays; Sir Chloe	—	—
June 6	Holmdel	United States	PNC Bank Arts Center	Alvvays; Sir Chloe	—	—
June 7	Camden	United States	Freedom Mortgage Pavilion	Alvvays; Hope Tala	—	—
June 8	Uncasville	United States	Mohegan Sun Arena	Hope Tala; Sir Chloe	—	—
June 10	Toronto	Canada	Budweiser Stage	Royel Otis; Sir Chloe	—	—
June 11	Clarkston	United States	Pine Knob Music Theatre	Royel Otis; Sir Chloe	—	—
June 13	Cuyahoga Falls	United States	Blossom Music Center	Royel Otis; Sir Chloe	—	—
June 14	Burgettstown	United States	The Pavilion at Star Lake	Flowerovlove; Sir Chloe	—	—
June 17	Chicago	United States	Huntington Bank Pavilion	Flowerovlove; Sir Chloe	—	—
June 18	Maryland Heights	United States	Hollywood Casino Amphitheatre	Flowerovlove; Magdalena Bay	—	—
June 20	Somerset	United States	Somerset Amphitheater	Flowerovlove; Magdalena Bay	—	—
June 22	Morrison	United States	Red Rocks Amphitheatre	Flowerovlove; Magdalena Bay	—	—
June 24	Salt Lake City	United States	Utah First Credit Union Amphitheatre	Flowerovlove; Magdalena Bay	—	—
June 26	Ridgefield	United States	Cascades Amphitheater	Flowerovlove; Magdalena Bay; Julia Wolf	—	—
June 28	Auburn	United States	White River Amphitheatre	Flowerovlove; Magdalena Bay; Julia Wolf	—	—
July 5	Lincoln	United States	The Venue at Thunder Valley Casino Resort	Alemeda	—	—
July 6	Highland	United States	Yaamava Theater	Alemeda	—	—
Total					58,764 / 75,576 (76.98%)	$3,539,159

=== Cancelled tour dates ===
Date (2025)	City	Country	Venue	Reason	Ref.
May 19	Rogers	United States	Walmart Arkansas Music Pavilion	Severe weather conditions	
June 4	Bangor	United States	Maine Savings Amphitheater	Vocal issues	
August 28	Istanbul	Turkey	Yenikapi Festival Park	Logistical limitations	
