= Hand That Feeds =

2025 single by Halsey and Amy Lee

Single by Halsey and Amy Lee
- Released: May 9, 2025
- Genre: Arena-goth; pop
- Length: 3:06
- Label: Columbia
- Songwriters: Halsey; Amy Lee; Jordan Fish; Michael Pollack; Griff Clawson
- Producer: Jordan Fish

Halsey singles chronology
"Safeword" (2025)	"Hand That Feeds" (2025)	"Carry The Weight" (2026)

Amy Lee singles chronology
"Love Hurts" (2022)	"Hand That Feeds" (2025)	"End of You" (2025)

Music video
- "Hand That Feeds" on YouTube

"Hand That Feeds" is a song by the American singer-songwriters Halsey and Amy Lee, recorded for the promotion in the official music video. Columbia Records released it as a single on May 9, 2025. Both artists wrote it with Michael Pollack, Griff Clawson, and its producer, Jordan Fish. Sonically, "Hand That Feeds" is an arena-goth and pop ballad with electronic instrumentals.

A music video for "Hand That Feeds", directed by Hannah Lux Davis, premiered on May 30, 2025; it intersperses scenes of Ballerina with clips of Halsey and Lee in ballet imagery. Both artists performed the song at select shows of the For My Last Trick: The Tour (2025). Commercially, it reached secondary charts in New Zealand, the United Kingdom, and the United States.

== Background and release ==
Throughout her music career, Halsey had expressed her admiration for Amy Lee, the lead vocalist of the rock band Evanescence. As part of the promotion campaign for her 2024 album The Great Impersonator, Halsey impersonated Lee as the artist who inspired the track "Lonely Is the Muse". She recreated the cover artwork of Evanescence's Fallen (2003), and called Lee the "OG dark rock queen"; it was received positively by the latter.

On May 6, 2025, Halsey and Lee announced the release of their collaboration, "Hand That Feeds", via their Instagram accounts; it was accompanied by a promotional picture of both wearing black outfits and holding hands. Halsey also published a snippet of the song and shared her excitement about its release, later naming it "one of the most surreal moments of herlife". Both artiste conceived the track for a 2025 action thriller film, which serves as a spin-off from the John Wick franchise.

"Hand That Feeds" was released on May 9, 2025, through Columbia Records. Halsey and Lee performed "Hand That Feeds" live for the first time on May 14, at the Los Angeles concert of the For My Last Trick: The Tour, Halsey's 2025 concert tour that includes Evanescence as the opening act at select dates. Hannah Lux Davis directed the music video for the single, which premiered on May 30. The video intersperses scenes from Ballerina with clips starring both singers. Halsey is seen dancing ballet and running in a street covered in blood, before being joined by Lee to sharpen knives. They are then tied to chairs and manage to escape. At the end of the video, they touch hands while trying to take an axe in the middle of a table, and stare to the camera.

== Music and lyrics ==
Halsey, Lee, Michael Pollack, Gliff Clawson, and Jordan Fish wrote "Hand That Feeds", while the latter, former member of the rock band Bring Me the Horizon and previous collaborator of both singers, was in charge of its production.

Emily Zemler from Rolling Stone categorized "Hand That Feeds" as a "thundering" pop song, while Tom Breihan of Stereogum defined it as "arena-goth". Additionally, its sound was described by Rock Sound's Maddy Howell as "dramatic and atmospheric", and by Billboard's Hannah Dailey as "haunting and cinematic". It is structured as a ballad with an electronic production mainly composed of piano and drone; Dailey said that these instruments are "eerie" and "siren-like". Halsey and Lee sing one verse each and share the vocal performance in the chorus.

== Charts ==
Chart performance for "Hand That Feeds"
Chart (2025)	Peak position
Australia Digital Tracks (ARIA)	25
New Zealand Hot Singles (RMNZ)	34
UK Singles Downloads (OCC)	43
UK Singles Sales (OCC)	45
US Digital Song Sales (Billboard)	21
US Hot Rock & Alternative Songs (Billboard)	49
