= Reflections in Real Time =

Studio album by Kilo Kish
- Released: February 29, 2016
- Genre: Synth-pop; R&B; dance-pop
- Length: 56:51
- Label: Kisha Soundscape + Audio; EMPIRE
- Producer: Ray Brady

Kilo Kish chronology
| Across Remixes (2015) | Reflections in Real Time (2016) | Mothe (2018) |

Singles from Reflections in Real Time
- 1. "Existential Crisis Hour!" Released: February 29, 2016; 2. "Obsessing" Released: January 17, 2017; 3. "Fulfillment" Released: November 2, 2017; 4. "Self Importance" Released: December 23, 2017

Reflections in Real Time is the debut studio album by American singer and songwriter, Kilo Kish. It was recorded with musician and producer Ray Brady, and released on February 29, 2016, through the singer's imprint label, Kisha Soundscape + Audio. Kish found that her previous musical offerings left virtually no impression of her personality, causing her to develop Reflections in Real Time as a time capsule of her early twenties.

== Background ==
Graduating from the Fashion Institute of Technology in 2012, Kish began to pursue a musical career when her roommates set up a home studio. She released a series of EPs, Homeschool (2012), K+ (2013) and Across (2014).

"Sometimes I feel [the internet] is stifling because everything is perceived to be a direct representation of who you are, which is hard because artists and all people change. Ideas and thoughts are fleeting and the permanence of things on the internet and their stamp on you as a person can box you in a bit."

–Kish speaking on her relationship with the internet

With Reflections in Real Time, Kish sought to express how she navigates the issue of sensory overload as an artist in 2016, "where the relationship between art and the public is quite strange and emotional togetherness in a real way is strained." Kish examined her own relationship with the internet, praising its ability to sustain openness in people yet vocalizing issues such as the fear of missing out and the pitfalls of social media engagement statistics.

Moving from New York to Los Angeles was a crucial turning point for Kish, where constant social events left her with a sense of jadedness. She credits Los Angeles for giving her space to ruminate: "I felt like I was being praised for the wrong things, and my work wasn't being respected in the way I wanted it to be. [...] I’d gone my whole life feeling like an individual, but New York really has a way of making you assimilate, of taking individuals and creating scenes out of them." Kish's work became more insular as her new residence lacked the former's tendency for "chance encounters" and quick turnarounds in artistic endeavors.

== Writing and development ==
Kish was motivated to express her personality through the record, desiring an honesty that would allow her audience to "put themselves in [her] headspace and see what they feel about these subjects." She pierced together topics from journal entries she'd written in her early twenties, highlighting themes of "fear", "obsession" and "self-importance". Appended with voice notes and the ilk from her cellphone, these topics would materialize in articulating her insecurities, existential thoughts and "how [she] felt about being a girlfriend". She sums it up as "whiny" and "narcissistic".

Conceptually, Kish has stated that the album achieves a stream of consciousness narrative that balances her darker sense of humor, in the "traumatic structure of a melodrama" that she likens to a soap opera. In an interview with Beat Magazine, Michael Cragg highlighted "Collected Views From Dinner" in particular for its humor, which was inspired by "any type of party or event".

"Anywhere that's up there with the most pretentious places of all time. It's like, 'What are we all going to talk without actually learning anything about each other?' And, like, flex our prowess all at the same time. And be super insecure about ourselves. And also one up the next person. All those things at the same time. It's a reflection of that. It can be like an elevator pitch at those things sometimes. It takes people hours to be themselves and sometimes only once they're drunk."

The album's second track, "Hello, Lakisha" explores how connotations associated with her given name have affected job searches and the way she is perceived by it: "I don’t wake up thinking of my life through the lens of a woman or a black woman. I wake up like I'm Lakisha Robinson, I'm an individual, and this is how I’m going to go through the day. [...] So, when people have all of these hang-ups and all of these barriers when it comes to such small differences, it literally makes no sense to me."

"Existential Crisis Hour" was born out of the introspection that moving to Los Angeles afforded her, running through a series of questions pertaining to the meaning of life and one's purpose in it: "I had been reading a lot and I had been spending full days, nights, by myself and then—I wasn't really depressed, I was just like, 'What?'" The song features a guest appearance from Donald Glover, who says two words: "I'd say that Donald answering 'yes' and 'no' are the driving force of how things get done, they're the path you take. Especially with those questions, having a definitive answer to them really changes your pathway significantly. [...] For instance, believing that you have a purpose or that you don't puts you in way different states of mind."

== Title and artwork ==
Kish expressed that album's title, Reflections in Real Time, is in relation to constantly updated activity streams, a major component of social media: "if you blink you'll miss something, or everything." The album is accompanied by an expressive black-and-white portrait of Kish; Marjon Carlos of Vogue comparing it to a Cindy Sherman film still. The photograph was shot by her friend, Emmanuel Olunkwa: "I knew I wanted [Reflections] to be like different emotional states throughout the record, so I was thinking I would do a four paneled thing with different dramatic faces, sad, happy, etcetera ... [Emmanuel and I] were just trying different faces when we took that one, and it was just the one." She dons "a sleek mane and matching turtleneck with gold hoops", Kish herself likening it to Sade's signature ensemble.

== Critical reception ==
In a positive review, Spin magazine's Anna Gaca called Reflections in Real Time a "revealing, sarcastic, and earnest" meditation on "both the immediacy of a social media-dependent society and her own narrowly focused lens: a snapshot of thoughts and concerns experienced between the ages of 23 and 24". AllMusic's Andy Kellman described it as "a sprawling and deeply personal album that flitted between fully developed songs and fragmentary interludes". Robert Christgau gave the album a two-star honorable mention in his column for Vice, indicating a "likable effort consumers attuned to its overriding aesthetic or individual vision may well enjoy". He cited "Hello, Lakisha", "Obsessing", and "Existential Crisis Hour!" as highlights while calling Kilo Kish's music "philosophical-psychological explorations in her own soft, crystal-clear, personal synth-pop lingo". Pryor Stroud from PopMatters was less enthusiastic about songs such as "Hello, Lakisha" and "Existential Crisis Hour", feeling they detracted from the focus of an album that otherwise aptly portrayed the singer's "post-adolescent, Internet-age anxieties", set to music that joined "the implosive R&B of FKA Twigs to the attention-deficient dance-pop of Shamir".

== Track listing ==
- All tracks written by Kilo Kish, and produced by Ray Brady, except noted.

| No. | Title | Length |
|---|---|---|
| 1. | "Thank You!" | 1:30 |
| 2. | "Hello, Lakisha" | 1:38 |
| 3. | "Distractions I: The Opposite Sex" | 3:13 |
| 4. | "Age + Self-Esteem: A Funhouse Mirror" | 2:46 |
| 5. | "Distractions II: The Dilemma of Cool" | 1:29 |
| 6. | "Self Importance" | 3:02 |
| 7. | "Collected Views from Dinner" | 3:01 |
| 8. | "Fulfillment?" | 3:12 |
| 9. | "Taking Responsibility" | 3:31 |
| 10. | "Intermission" (featuring John Anderson) | 1:45 |
| 11. | "The Fears of a Dilettante" | 3:21 |
| 12. | "Obsessing" | 3:14 |
| 13. | "Life: The Cruel Interlude (On God)" | 3:11 |
| 14. | "Frustrations + Solutions" | 3:02 |
| 15. | "Humans + Ants in Proportion (Unfinished)" | 2:48 |
| 16. | "Existential Crisis Hour!" | 1:08 |
| 17. | "On the Mend" | 2:15 |
| 18. | "Relief! (My Answers So Far)" | 2:48 |
| 19. | "Poem A" | 1:19 |
| 20. | "Outpatient Mentality" | 8:38 |
| Total length: | | 56:51 |

Notes

- "Existential Crisis Hour!" contains uncredited vocals from Donald Glover.
- "Outpatient Mentality" contains hidden track "Memory Lane".

== Bibliography ==
- Christgau, Robert (2000). Christgau's Consumer Guide: Albums of the '90s. Macmillan. ISBN 0312245602.
- Christgau, Robert (March 25, 2016). "Stoned Soul Quick Picks: Expert Witness with Robert Christgau". Vice.
- Gaca, Anna (March 15, 2016). "Review: Kilo Kish Has No (Instagram) Filter on 'Reflections in Real Time'". Spin.
- Kellman, Andy (n.d.). "Kilo Kush". AllMusic.
- Ratliff, Ben (March 9, 2016). "Songs That Take Their Time, Evolve and Ask Plenty of Questions". The New York Times.
- Stroud, Pryor (April 8, 2016). "Kilo Kish: Reflections in Real Time". PopMatters.
- Thompson, Desire (March 9, 2016). "Review: Kilo Kish's 'Reflections In Real Time' Proves The Quarter-Life Crisis Is Real". Vibe.
