= K+ =

K+ or K^{+} may refer to:

- A positively charged potassium ion
- A positively charged kaon particle
- K+, sensitivity to the K spot test
- K+ (mixtape), by Kilo Kish, 2013
- K-Plus, a pay television channel in Indonesia, Malaysia, and Philippines
- K+, a family of Vietnamese premium television channels owned by Canal+ and VTV, and defunct/shutdown on January 1st, 2026
