= American Gurl =

Studio album by Kilo Kish
- Released: March 25, 2022
- Genre: Pop
- Length: 39:23
- Label: Kisha Soundscape + Audio
- Producer: Raymond Brady

Kilo Kish chronology
Redux (2019)	American Gurl (2022)	Negotiations (2025)

Singles from American Gurl
- 1. "American Gurl" Released: July 23, 2021; 2. "Bloody Future" Released: August 20, 2021; 3. "New Tricks: Art, Aesthetics, and Money" Released: January 28, 2022; 4. "No Apology!" Released: February 25, 2022; 5. "Death Fantasy" Released: March 22, 2022

American Gurl ratings
Review scores
Source	Rating
The Line of Best Fit	9/10
Pitchfork	7.2/10

American Gurl is the second studio album by American singer and songwriter Kilo Kish. It was released on March 25, 2022, through Kish's imprint label, Kisha Soundscape + Audio. The album comes six years after Kish's debut album, Reflections in Real Time (2016), and two years after her EP, Redux (2019).

== Background ==
Kilo Kish released her debut studio album, Reflections in Real Time in February 2016. Kish later collaborated with several more high-profile artists such as American rapper, Vince Staples in 2016, on his song "Loco", and English virtual band, Gorillaz in 2017, on their song "Out of Body". In 2018, Kish released her second EP, Mothe, and her third EP, Redux a year later in 2019.

== Release and promotion ==
Kish announced the album's title track as the lead single on July 15, 2021. Four days later on July 19, she confirmed that an album was in the works and that she had started the project in 2019. The single was released on July 23, along with a music video. She announced the second single "Bloody Future" on August 11. The single was released on August 20, along with a music video.

The third single "New Tricks: Art, Aesthetics, and Money" was announced on January 24, 2022. It was released on January 28 and features an appearance from American rapper Vince Staples. The fourth single titled "No Apology!" was released on February 25, 2022. On March 9, Kish announced through her social media outlets that her second studio album titled American Gurl would be released on March 25, 2022, and that it had been worked on at the same time as Redux. The announcement came with the album's cover and tracklist.

== Track listing ==
All tracks are written by Lakisha Robinson, except where noted.

American Gurl track listing
No.	Title	Writer(s)	Length
1.	"Play"		0:35
2.	"American Gurl"		3:49
3.	"Death Fantasy" (featuring Miguel)	Robinson; Miguel Pimentel	2:09
4.	"Distractions III: Spoiled Rotten"		3:03
5.	"No Apology!"		3:16
6.	"Bloody Future"		3:26
7.	"Choice Cowboy" (featuring Jean Dawson)		2:54
8.	"Attention Politician"		3:19
9.	"New Tricks: Art, Aesthetics, and Money" (featuring Vince Staples)	Robinson; Vince Staples	3:10
10.	"TV Baby V.2 (Latch Key March)"		1:57
11.	"On the Outside (Justin's Song)"		3:35
12.	"Super Ko Love"		3:36
13.	"Intelligent Design" (featuring Jesse Boykins III)	Robinson; Jesse Boykins III	3:38
14.	"Continue?"		0:59
Total length:			39:23

Super Deluxe Value Size track listing
No.	Title	Length
15.	"Good Money?"	3:49
16.	"Not Your Accessory"	3:33
17.	"Star Power: LA Nightmares"	2:57
18.	"Incredible World"	3:21
19.	"American Gurl Theme" (8-Bit Extended)	3:38
Total length:		56:41

Note

- All track titles are stylized in all caps.
