= Ego (Halsey song) =

2024 single by Halsey

- Promotional picture

Single by Halsey

from the album The Great Impersonator
- Released: September 6, 2024
- Genre: Alternative rock; grunge; pop-punk; pop rock
- Length: 3:18
- Label: Columbia
- Songwriters: Halsey; Gregory Aldae Hein; Greg Kurstin
- Producers: Greg Kurstin; Wyatt Bernard; Michael Uzowuru; Austin Corona

Halsey singles chronology
"Lonely Is the Muse" (2024)	"Ego" (2024)	"I Never Loved You" (2024)

Music video
- "Ego" on YouTube

"Ego" is a song by the American singer Halsey from her fifth studio album, The Great Impersonator (2024). It was released through Columbia Records on September 6, 2024, as the album's third single. Halsey wrote the song along with Gregory Aldae Hein and Greg Kurstin, while Kurstin, Wyatt Bernard, Michael Uzowuru, and Austin Corona handled its production. "Ego" is a 1990s-inspired alternative rock, grunge, pop-punk, and pop rock track driven by guitar and drums, with an anthemic energy and lyrics about Halsey's personal struggles and insecurities with her public persona. It was influenced by Dolores O'Riordan of the Cranberries, whom Halsey impersonated as part of the album's promotion.

Upon its release, the song was met with a positive reception from music critics, who noted similarities with the works of O'Riordan and the bands Garbage and No Doubt. Commercially, the song appeared on secondary charts in five countries, including on the US Bubbling Under Hot 100. An accompanying self-written and self-directed music video for "Ego" was released to Halsey's Vevo channel; it sees the singer playing two gender roles representing two versions of herself. She performed "Ego" at the 2024 MTV Video Music Awards, joined by a garage rock band that included Måneskin's bassist Victoria De Angelis.

== Background and release ==
Halsey first previewed a new album in June 2024 with the release of "The End", where she revealed how she was informed of her lupus and T cell disorder diagnosis. It was followed by "Lucky" and "Lonely Is the Muse", on which Halsey explored themes of health issues and self-worth. At the end of August, she announced her fifth studio album titled The Great Impersonator; in its accompanying trailer, she says: "I really thought this album might be the last one I ever made".

Columbia Records released "Ego" on September 6, 2024, as the third single from The Great Impersonator. A week after, Sony Music Italy sent the song to Italian radio airplay. Halsey expressed her desire for fans to "listen closely" to the track. On September 25, she revealed the album's track listing, in which "Ego" appears as the second song. She hosted a countdown on social media where she impersonated artists who influenced each album track; for "Ego", Halsey channeled Dolores O'Riordan of the Cranberries.

== Composition ==
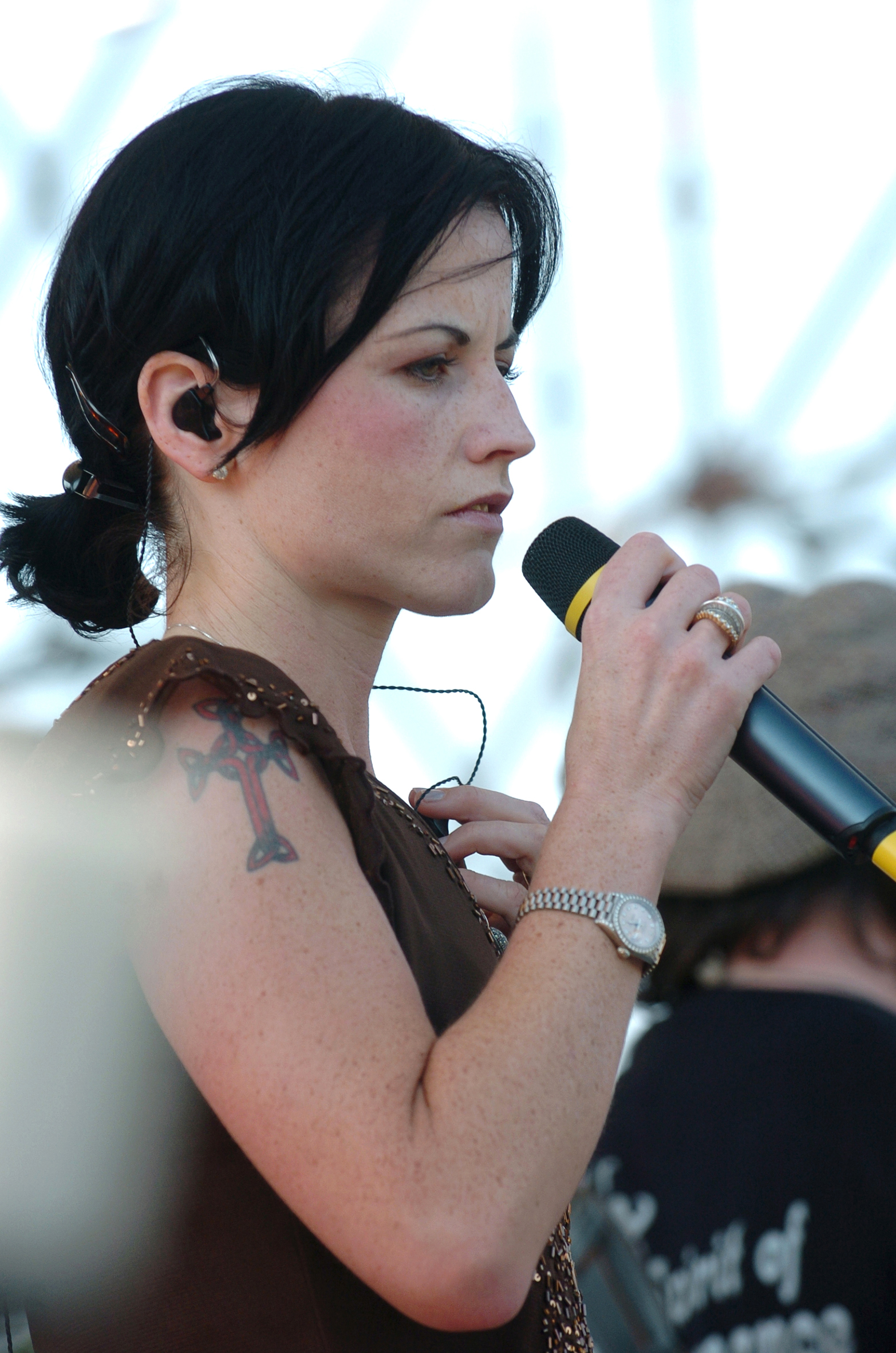
"Ego" was inspired by Dolores O'Riordan (pictured) and compared to her works by music critics.

"Ego" is 3 minutes and 18 seconds long. Halsey co-wrote the song with Gregory Aldae Hein and Greg Kurstin, while the latter, Wyatt Bernard, Michael Uzowuru, and Austin Corona handled its production. They played various instruments, accompanied by Alex G on guitar and Dylan Wiggins on drums. The song was engineered by Kurstin, Matt Tuggle, and Julian Burg; they were accompanied by Kieran Beardmore and Matt Wolach as assistant engineers. Caleb Laven served as the vocal producer, Sean Matsukawa as the recording engineer, Randy Merrill as the mastering engineer, and Spike Stent as the mixing engineer.

Music critics labeled "Ego" as an alternative rock, grunge, pop-punk, and pop rock track, inspired by 1990s music. Containing powerful drums and guitar lines, it was described by critics as anthemic. The song continues Halsey's "exploration of different musical eras", according to Jessica Lynch of Billboard. Critics believed it was reminiscent to the works of O'Riordan, especially for its "doo doo doo" vocalizations. Exclaim!'s Karlie Rogers compared it to other Halsey songs like Manic's "3AM" (2020) and If I Can't Have Love, I Want Power's "Easier than Lying" (2021). Rolling Stone's Emily Zemler drew similarities between the propulsive chorus of "Ego" and the music of the bands Garbage and No Doubt, while Beats Per Minute's John Amen found it reminiscent to the Alanis Morissette album Jagged Little Pill (1995). Additionally, Slant Magazine's Sal Cinquemani thought that it is "something Avril Lavigne would sing".

The lyrics of the song are vulnerable and confessional, describing an inner battle with herself and her public persona, as she sings, "And I'm nervous what you'll think of me now". At the end of "Ego"'s bridge, Halsey reflects on how she "disguised [her] illness", referencing her diagnosis: "Who am I kidding? / I'm doing way worse than I'm admitting". An internal battle with herself, the song ends with the lyric, "I'm really not that happy being me".

== Reception ==
Critics were positive about the songwriting on "Ego". Aaron Williams of Uproxx wrote that it "projects all of the vulnerable, confessional energy" from The Great Impersonator's previous singles. Maria Sherman from the Associated Press said that the song is part of a return to "the music that made Halsey a teenage superstar". Andrew Unterberger of Billboard praised the song's "brutal" chorus and said that it showcases Halsey as "one of the most vital songwriters and performers in either pop or rock". The staff of the latter magazine included "Ego" on its year-end list of the best songs of 2024, at number 70; Stephen Daw believed that Halsey retained the "honest" lyricism from The Great Impersonator on "Ego", and described the song as a "musically rollicking new addition to her discography".

Commercially, "Ego" reached secondary charts in five countries. In the United States, it peaked at number 18 on the Bubbling Under Hot 100, while additionally reaching numbers 25 and 28 on the Adult Pop Airplay and Pop Airplay charts, respectively; the latter two issued for October 26, 2024. It appeared in two Billboard radio charts in Canada, at number 34 on the Canada CHR/Top 40 and number 39 on the Canada Hot AC. "Ego" also charted in the Czech Republic Rádio – Top 100, Japan Hot Overseas, and New Zealand Hot Singles charts.

== Music video ==
Halsey wrote and directed the music video for "Ego", which was also released on September 6, 2024. It depicts Halsey playing two characters representing two versions of herself. One has long red hair with makeup and a black dress, while the other has short hair of the same color, wearing no makeup and a tuxedo. As the video progresses, they are seen eating dinner and chasing and trying to kill one another around a house. Dylan Kickham of Nylon believed the video is similar to the 2005 American film Mr. & Mrs. Smith.

== Live performances ==
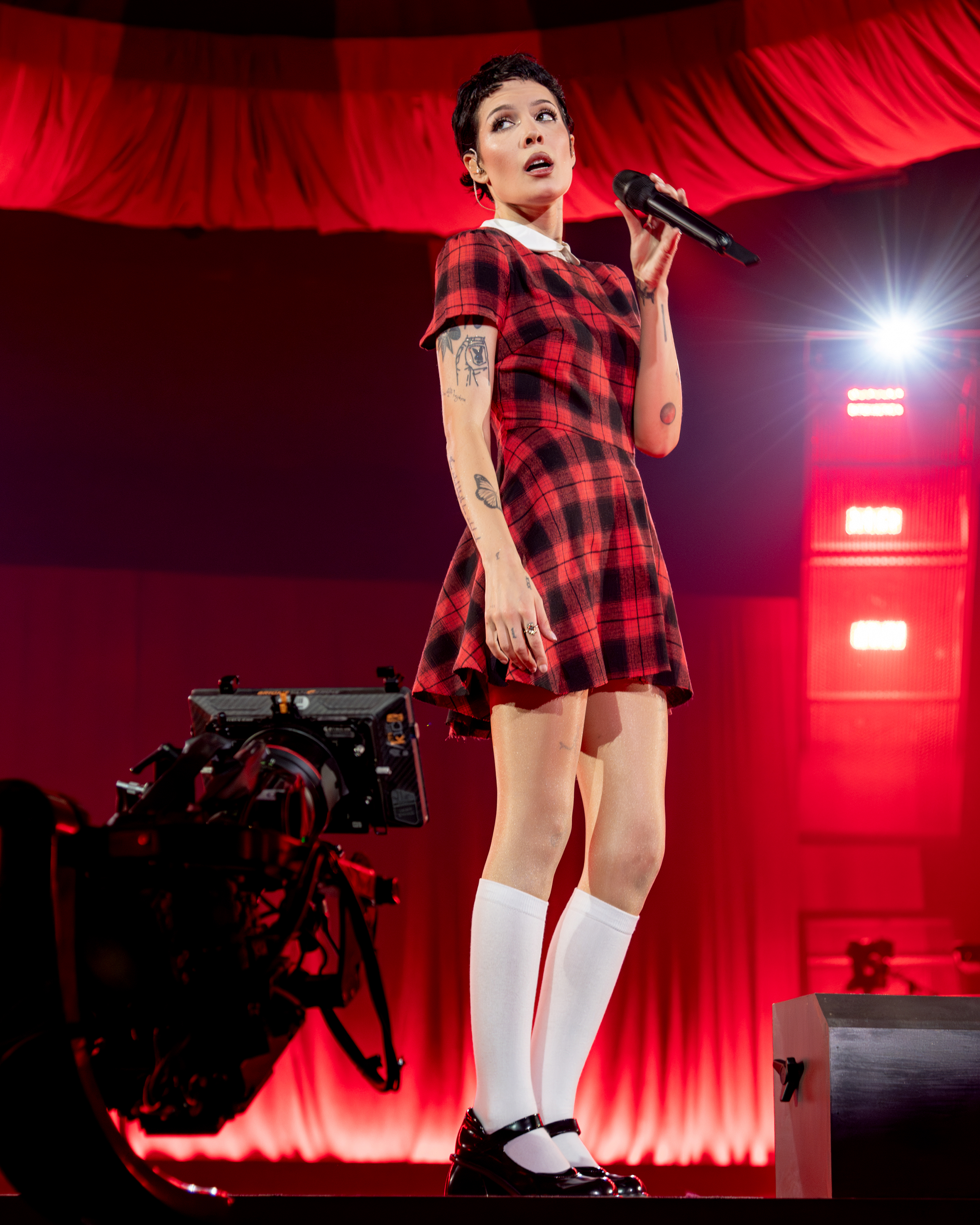
Halsey performing at Amazon Music Live

Prior to its release, Halsey debuted "Ego" during an intimate live show at London's Koko in August 2024. She told the crowd: "I've been teasing a new song for the past couple of days [...] You guys are the first people in the world to hear it".

On September 11, 2024, Halsey performed "Ego" at the 2024 MTV Video Music Awards alongside a band formed by her "dream '90s garage rock band", with Måneskin's Victoria De Angelis on bass, Jazzelle Zanaughtti on synthesizers, and Maya Stepansky on drums. It started with Halsey riding across the stage on a bicycle, and then she opened the garage door of a house to reveal the special guests and perform the song. Megan Armstrong from Uproxx drew comparisons to the 2003 American film Freaky Friday. After the performance, Halsey captioned an Instagram post with: "I'm so proud of this whole performance and I built every detail of it myself because I was determined to go up there and have FUN". In an interview with Alexandra Cooper on Call Her Daddy, the singer said that she experienced a lupus flare brought on by the stress of the rehearsals for the performance.

For the live debut of The Great Impersonator, Halsey performed "Ego" as part of a live-streamed Halloween show at Amazon Music Live. It was included in the set list for the 1990s era, in which she also played rock renditions of "You Should Be Sad" (2020) and "Colors" (2016). On March 7, 2025, Halsey performed the track at the Sips and Sounds Festival in Austin, Texas.

== Personnel ==
The credits shown below are adapted from Apple Music.

- Halsey – vocals, songwriter
- Greg Kurstin – drums, bass, percussion, electric guitar, songwriter, producer, engineer
- Wyatt Bernard – keyboards, producer
- Michael Uzowuru – keyboards, producer
- Alex G – guitar
- Austin Corona – guitar, producer
- Dylan Wiggins – drums
- Gregory Aldae Hein – songwriter
- Caleb Laven – vocal producer
- Julian Burg – engineer
- Matt Tuggle – engineer
- Sean Matsukawa – recording engineer
- Matt Wolach – assistant engineer
- Kieran Beardmore – assistant engineer
- Randy Merrill – mastering engineer
- Mark "Spike" Stent – mixing engineer

== Charts ==
Chart performance for "Ego"
Chart (2024)	Peak position
Canada CHR/Top 40 (Billboard)	34
Canada Hot AC (Billboard)	39
Czech Republic Airplay (ČNS IFPI)	57
Japan Hot Overseas (Billboard Japan)	20
New Zealand Hot Singles (RMNZ)	16
US Bubbling Under Hot 100 (Billboard)	18
US Adult Pop Airplay (Billboard)	25
US Pop Airplay (Billboard)	28
