= Safeword (song) =

2025 single by Halsey

Single by Halsey
- Released: February 27, 2025
- Genre: Punk rock; pop-punk
- Length: 2:13
- Label: Columbia
- Songwriters: Halsey; Austin Corona; Wyatt Bernard
- Producers: Halsey; Austin Corona; Wyatt Bernard

Halsey singles chronology
"I Never Loved You" (2024)	"Safeword" (2025)	"Hand That Feeds" (2025)

Music video
- "Safeword" on YouTube

"Safeword" is a song by the American singer Halsey. She wrote it along with its producers, Austin Corona and Wyatt Bernard. Columbia Records released it as a single on February 27, 2025, as Halsey's first release since her previous studio album The Great Impersonator (2024). It is a punk rock and pop-punk track with lyrics about BDSM. A music video for "Safeword", directed by Lana Jay Lackey, premiered on the same date; it stars Halsey portraying a dominatrix wearing various latex outfits. The singer performed it live for the first time at the Sips and Sounds festival on March 7, 2025.

== Background and release ==
In mid-February 2025, Halsey announced her fifth concert tour, titled For My Last Trick: The Tour. On a tweet, she revealed that she would be playing songs from her album The Great Impersonator (2024) as well as previous songs, and ended the sentence by saying: "And new ones too! And even the one I'm dropping next week." She announced the single "Safeword" on February 24, 2025, which was released alongside a music video on February 27 at 12:00 Eastern Standard Time (UTC−5). She also shared a 13-second teaser of the video, where she is shouting, "You're not the boss of me!" Answering a fan on Twitter, Halsey described the song's theme as "Obedience".

== Composition ==
Musically, "Safeword" is a punk rock and pop-punk track, led by a distorted guitar-driven beat and a fast rhythm. Ilana Kaplan of People described its sound as "Ramones-meets-Bikini Kill", Stephen Daw of Billboard compared it to Bratmobile, and Abby Jones of Stereogum said that it was similar to the styles of riot grrrl and Kathleen Hanna. The lyrics of the song focus on BDSM, as depicted in the verse, "I'm not a criminal, I'm just a wild child / I'm not a bad girl, I just like it wild style". Halsey sings directly to a lover about the things she would like them to do.

== Reception ==
Daw included "Safeword" on a list of the best queer songs of its release week, and believed that it boosted the "chameleonic approach" of The Great Impersonator to "new levels". Derrick Rossignol from Uproxx dubbed "Safeword" part of the best music of its release week and said that it depicts Halsey "at her most provocative".

== Music video ==
Lana Jay Lackey directed the music video for "Safeword", which premiered alongside the single. It stars Halsey portraying a dominatrix in a S&M style, wearing various outfits made of latex. Prior to its release, she stated that it was "not safe for work. Or the bus. Or brunch with your parents. Or your jealous boyfriend." The video begins with the singer wearing a leather outfit and knee-high stiletto heels beside a man, who is lying on the floor with a leather mask. She is then dominated by him and seen hanging upside down, as well as simulating masturbation.

== Live performances ==
Halsey performed "Safeword" live for the first time at the Sips and Sounds Festival in Austin, Texas, on March 7, 2025. Days later, she shared the official footage on social media. In the performance, she is seen wearing a babydoll white dress and black cowboy boots.

== Release history ==
Release dates and formats for "Safeword"
Region	Date	Format	Label	Ref.
Various	February 27, 2025	Digital download; streaming	Columbia	
Italy	February 28, 2025	Radio airplay	Sony Italy	
