= Journey to the 5th Echelon =

Studio album by The Jet Age of Tomorrow
- Released: December 31, 2010; January 9, 2011 (iTunes edition)
- Recorded: 2009–2010
- Genres: Trip hop; electronic; acid jazz; alternative hip hop; neo-psychedelia
- Length: 65:48
- Label: Self-released
- Producers: The Super 3 (also exec.); Left Brain; Tyler Major; Tyler, the Creator; Michael Uzowuru; Kream Team

The Jet Age of Tomorrow chronology
Voyager (2010)	Journey to the 5th Echelon (2010)	JellyFish Mentality (2013)

Journey to the 5th Echelon is the second studio album by Odd Future sub-group The Jet Age of Tomorrow. It was released on December 31, 2010. It contains guest appearances from Hodgy, Mike G, Vince Staples, Jay Cue, Kilo Kish, Om'Mas Keith, Casey Veggies, and Tyler, the Creator.

== Release and promotion ==
The album was released on the Odd Future Tumblr page on December 31, 2010. On February 4, 2011, a music video for "Wonderland" was posted on the official Odd Future YouTube channel.

== Track listing ==
- All credits adapted from Discogs.
- All tracks written by Matthew Martin and Hal Williams, Jr. except where noted.

No.	Title	Writer(s)	Producer(s)	Length
1.	"Green Stars (Intro)"		The Super 3	3:37
2.	"5th Echelon"		The Super 3	2:25
3.	"Pack Up"		The Super 3	3:35
4.	"Love in the Purple Forest"		The Super 3	5:01
5.	"Dust Off" (featuring Hodgy Beats and Mike G)	Martin; Williams; Gerard Long; Michael Griffin II	The Super 3	5:20
6.	"Thump Thump"		The Super 3	3:23
7.	"The Fallen Angels"	Martin; Williams; Vyron Turner	The Super 3; Left Brain	4:31
8.	"Sunburst"		The Super 3; Tyler Major	2:38
9.	"Lunchbox" (featuring Vince Staples and JQ)	Martin; Williams; Vincent Staples; JQ	The Super 3	2:41
10.	"Wonderland"		The Super 3	5:31
11.	"Betty's Room"	Martin; Williams; Tyler Okonma	Tyler, the Creator	2:35
12.	"Want You Still" (featuring Kilo Kish)	Martin; Williams; Lakisha Robinson; Michael Uzowuru	Uzowuru	3:53
13.	"The Finer Things" (featuring Om'Mas Keith)	Martin; Williams; Keith	The Super 3	3:18
14.	"Protozoa (Yow!)"		The Super 3	2:35
15.	"Burfday"		The Super 3	2:01
16.	"Sleep!"		The Super 3	2:17
17.	"Welcome Home Son" (featuring Casey Veggies and Tyler, the Creator)	Martin; Williams; Casey Jones; Okonma	The Super 3	2:57
18.	"A Happy Ending"		The Super 3; Kream Team	6:12
19.	"Her Secrets" (Bonus track)		The Super 3	3:19
Total length:				65:48

iTunes Edition bonus tracks
No.	Title	Writer(s)	Producer(s)	Length
20.	"Let's Make A Porno?" (Bonus track)	Williams	Hal Williams	2:21
21.	"Take Me To Atlantis" (Bonus track)		The Super 3	2:58
Total length:				70:06

Notes

- The iTunes Edition includes an alternate version of "Green Stars (Intro)" which runs for 2:36 instead of 3:37.
- "Let’s Make A Porno?" was originally released in 2010 off of Hal William's mixtape paint under the title "Porn".

== Personnel ==
- The Jet Age of Tomorrow – primary artist, executive producer, producer on tracks 1–10 and 12–19
- Hodgy – featured artist on track 5
- Mike G – featured artist on track 5
- Left Brain – co-producer on track 7
- Tyler Major – co-producer on track 8
- Vince Staples – featured artist on track 9
- Jay Cue – featured artist on track 9
- Tyler, the Creator – producer on track 11, featured artist on track 17
- Kilo Kish – featured artist on track 12
- Michael Uzowuru – producer on track 12
- Om'Mas Keith – featured artist on track 13
- Casey Veggies – featured artist on track 17
- Kream Team – co-producer on track 18
