= K+ (mixtape) =

Mixtape by Kilo Kish
- Released: February 7, 2013
- Recorded: 2012
- Genre: Experimental
- Length: 30:56
- Label: Self-released
- Producer: Star Slinger; Matt Martians; SBTRKT; Kilo Kish; randomblackdude; Childish Gambino; PROF CALC; Very Rare; Patrice Raige; CRONOS

Kilo Kish chronology
Homeschool EP (2012)	K+ (2013)	#ACROSS (2013)

K+ is the debut mixtape of American vocalist Kilo Kish. It was released as a digital download on February 7, 2013.

== Production ==
Several demos were recorded for K+, both in the studio and at home.

== Reception ==
Professional ratings
Review scores
Source	Rating
Consequence of Sound	2.5/5 stars
NME	7/10

Initially, K+ received a mixed to positive critical response. BBC Music's Mike Diver wrote K+ recalled "both Lauryn Hill’s guard-down emotions, articulated brilliantly on The Miseducation of [Lauryn Hill], and the solid narrative structure that served Kendrick Lamar’s good kid, m.A.A.d city so well. Her promise is reaching fruition." Writing for The A&T Register, Jeffrey Lockhart felt the mixtape was "very well polished, and professional," and assumed that Kilo Kish had "a future in the music industry." NME writer Siân Rowe, giving the album a 7 out of 10, said that Kish "might not be entirely #wow just yet (unsurprising, considering she made songs for her debut ‘Homeschool’ EP as a “joke… kinda”) but she’s heading there." In a more varied review, Mike Madden of Consequence of Sound said the mixtape was "a very of-the-moment project" due to its influences and elements of genres like neo-soul and trap music, but criticized it because "it winds up so exemplary of some fads in music circa now – and gets so little out of them – that it’s all too easy to imagine it blending in with everything else that sounds similar and going obsolete within a year or two."

== Track listing ==
No.	Title	Writer(s)	Producer(s)	Length
1.	"K+ Intro"	Lakisha Robinson		1:03
2.	"Goldmine"	Robinson; Darren Williams	Star Slinger	3:54
3.	"Ghost" (featuring Childish Gambino)	Robinson; Donald Glover Jr.; Matthew Martin; Aaron Jerome	Matt Martians; SBTRKT; Kilo Kish	2:37
4.	"Trappin'" (featuring Vince Staples)	Robinson; Vincent Staples; Thebe Kgositsile	randomblackdude	3:53
5.	"IOU"	Robinson; Martin	Matt Martians	2:23
6.	"Turquoise"	Robinson	Prof. Calc	2:58
7.	"Scones"	Robinson; Glover	Childish Gambino	1:59
8.	"Love2K" (featuring ASAP Ferg)	Robinson; Darold Brown Ferguson Jr.	Very Rare	2:40
9.	"Better"	Robinson	Patrice Raige	3:03
10.	"Creepwave" (featuring Flatbush Zombies)	Robinson; Dimitri Simms; Antonio Lewis; Erick Elliott	Cronos	3:44
Total length:				30:56

Notes

- "Trappin'" features additional vocals by Earl Sweatshirt
- "Scones" features additional vocals by Childish Gambino

Sample credits

- "IOU" contains a sample of "SexyBack" as written by Justin Timberlake, Timothy Mosley and Floyd Nathaniel Hills and performed by Justin Timberlake and Timbaland, from the album FutureSex/LoveSounds

== Personnel ==
- Kilo Kish – songwriter, vocalist, producer
- Childish Gambino – songwriter, vocalist, producer
- Vince Staples – songwriter, vocalist
- ASAP Ferg – songwriter, vocalist
- Kilo Pez - songwriter
- Earl Sweatshirt – vocalist, producer (as randomblackdude)
- Flatbush Zombies – vocalists
- Jesse Boykins III – vocalist
- Joe McCaffery – guitarist
- Star Slinger – producer
- Matt Martians – producer
- PROF CALC – producer
- Very Rare – producer
- Patrice Raige – producer
- CRONOS – producer
- Benjanim Julia – engineer
- Leon Kelly – engineer
- Joey Raia – mixer
- Joe LaPorta – mastering
- Phillip T. Annand – artwork
