= Michael Uzowuru =

American record producer (born 1991)

- Born: November 10, 1991 (age 35); Los Angeles, California, U.S.
- Genres: Alternative R&B; R&B; hip hop; pop; ambient
- Occupations: Record producer, songwriter
- Years active: 2010–present

Michael Uzowuru // (born November 10, 1991) is an American record producer and songwriter. He has produced and written for SZA, Frank Ocean, FKA Twigs, Beyoncé, Donald Glover, Vince Staples, Earl Sweatshirt, and Rosalía, among others.

== Life and career ==
Michael Uzowuru was born on November 10, 1991, in Los Angeles and raised in both Cypress, California and Rancho Cucamonga, California. He went to Etiwanda High School in Rancho Cucamonga. Uzowuru is of Igbo descent through his mother, who immigrated to the United States from Nigeria.

=== 2010–2015: Career beginnings ===
Uzowuru began his music career by making independent beat tapes and working with a number of collaborators. His early projects include works with Vince Staples and Odd Future's Domo Genesis, Matt Martians from the Jet Age of Tomorrow, and Hodgy Beats.

In 2012, Uzowuru released a mixtape with the title Winter in Prague with longtime friend and collaborator Vince Staples. In 2013, Uzowuru produced the opening track "Pre" for Earl Sweatshirt's debut album Doris. Later that year, he produced "Tweakin" and "Yap Yap" for Chicago rapper Vic Mensa's second mixtape Innanetape.

In addition to producing for other artists, Uzowuru released a number of instrumental and solo projects in 2014, notably Paisley Palm Trees, which was premiered by The Fader magazine and Pink Orchids, released in August 2014.

=== 2016–present ===
Uzowuru was named in the production credits for Frank Ocean's 2016 visual album Endless and Ocean's long-awaited second studio album Blonde. Uzowuru was credited as both a writer and a producer on the track "Nights". About Uzowuru's collaborations, Frank Ocean stated, "...his appetite has grown; his vocabulary, musically, has grown so much over the time that I’ve known him."

He also executive produced rapper Kevin Abstract's second album American Boyfriend, which debuted in the fall of 2016.

In 2017, he appeared as co-producer on Frank Ocean's single "Chanel" released on Ocean's Beats1 radio show. Scott Vener and Pharrell Williams premiered a remix done by Uzowuru and collaborator Jeff Kleinman of Little Dragon's "High" featuring Denzel Curry and Twelve'len

In 2018, Uzowuru's work appeared on Anderson .Paak's "Til It's Over", which was used in Apple's "Welcome Home" commercial directed by Spike Jonze.

In the spring of 2019, Uzowuru composed the score for the short film Guava Island, starred and produced by Donald Glover and released by Amazon Studios. The following summer, Uzowuru was credited for writing and production on Beyoncé's compilation album The Lion King: The Gift, having worked on the tracks "Mood 4 Eva" and "Brown Skin Girl". He also wrote and produced for artists FKA Twigs and GoldLink. Later in the year, Uzowuru appeared on the production and writing credits of the Frank Ocean single "In My Room".

Uzowuru collaborated with Spanish singer Rosalía through 2020 and 2021 and co-produced her album Motomami, which ended up winning the Digital Album of the Year Award in the Latin Grammy Awards of 2022.

In 2022, Uzowuru executive-produced Vince Staples album Ramona Park Broke My Heart. The album received widespread critical acclaim and appeared on several best album year-end lists. After collaborating with him for the same year, SZA added, "...he’s an omen, a sign I’m doing something different, special and necessary."

In 2023, Uzowuru composed the score and co-produced the soundtrack for the Amazon TV series Swarm created by Donald Glover and Janine Nabers, which was also released as an EP. He contributed to 10 out of 18 tracks on The Great Impersonator by Halsey (singer)

== Influence ==
In a 2015 MSNBC interview, Uzowuru mentioned a number of musicians across a wide range of genre as his inspiration, including Elliott Smith, Nirvana, Kanye West, Miles Davis, John Coltrane, Afrobeat, Fela Kuti and Björk.

== Discography ==
=== Music for TV and film ===
List of scores composed for Film/Television
Year	Film	Studio / Company	Director
2020	Becoming	Netflix	Nadira Hallgren
2019	Guava Island	Amazon	Hiro Murai
2018	Welcome Home (commercial)	Apple	Spike Jonze
2018	5 Reasons iPad Pro Can Be Your Next Computer (commercial)	Apple	
2023	Swarm (TV series)	Amazon	Multiple

=== Writing and production credits ===
List of songs produced, showing year released, artist and album name
Year	Artist	Album	Song
2024	Nemahsis	Single	"Chemical Mark"
2024	Sofia Valdes	Silvia (EP)	"Un Momento"
2024	The Kid Laroi	Single	"CALL ME INSTEAD" (feat. YoungBoy Never Broke Again, Robert Glasper)
2024	Vince Staples	Dark Times	"Nothing Matters"
2024	Vince Staples	Dark Times	"Children’s Song"
2024	Vince Staples	Dark Times	"Black&Blue"
2024	Vince Staples	Dark Times	"Shame On The Devil"
2024	Vince Staples	Dark Times	"Freeman"
2024	Childish Gambino	Bando Stone and The New World	"No Excuses" (feat. Ludwig Göransson & Kamasi Washington"
2024	Childish Gambino	Bando Stone and The New World	"Steps Beach"
2024	Childish Gambino	Bando Stone and The New World	"Dadvocate"
2024	Childish Gambino	Bando Stone and The New World	"Survive" (feat. Chlöe)
2024	Childish Gambino	Bando Stone and The New World	"Happy Survival" (feat. Khruangbin)
2024	Childish Gambino	Bando Stone and The New World	"H3@RT$ W3RE M3@NT T0 F7Y"
2024	Childish Gambino	Bando Stone and The New World	"A Place Where Love Goes"
2024	Childish Gambino	Bando Stone and The New World	"Talk My Shit" (feat. Amaarae & Flo Milli)
2024	Childish Gambino	Bando Stone and The New World	"We Are God"
2024	Childish Gambino	Bando Stone and The New World	"Real Love"
2024	Childish Gambino	Bando Stone and The New World	"Cruisin’" (feat. Yeat)
2024	Childish Gambino	Bando Stone and The New World	"Can You Feel Me" (feat. Legend)
2024	Childish Gambino	Bando Stone and The New World	"Running Around" (feat. Fousheé)
2024	Childish Gambino	Bando Stone and The New World	"Yoshinoya"
2024	Childish Gambino	Bando Stone and The New World	"In the Night" (feat. Jorja Smith & Amaarae)
2024	Childish Gambino	Bando Stone and The New World	"Lithonia"
2024	SZA	Lana	"No More Hiding"
2024	SZA	Lana	"Diamond Boy (DTM)"
2024	SZA	Lana	"Scorsese Baby Daddy"
2024	SZA	Lana	"Get Behind Me (Interlude)"
2024	SZA	Lana	"Another Life"
2024	Halsey	The Great Impersonator	"Only Living Girl in LA"
2024	Halsey	The Great Impersonator	"Ego"
2024	Halsey	The Great Impersonator	"The End"
2024	Halsey	The Great Impersonator	"Hometown"
2024	Halsey	The Great Impersonator	"I Believe in Magic"
2024	Halsey	The Great Impersonator	"Hurt Feelings"
2024	Halsey	The Great Impersonator	"Dog Years"
2024	Halsey	The Great Impersonator	"The Great Impersonator"
2024	Halsey	The Great Impersonator	"Arsonist"
2024	Halsey	The Great Impersonator	"Lucky"
2023	Ni'Jah	Swarm (EP)	"Big World"
2023	Ni'Jah	Swarm (EP)	"Agatha"
2023	Ni'Jah	Swarm (EP)	"Sticky"
2023	Snoh Alegra	Single	“Be My Summer"
2023	Dominic Fike	Sunburn	"4X4"
2023	Sofia Valdes	Silvia (EP)	"Midnight Freak-Out"
2023	Sofia Valdes	Silvia (EP)	"Easy"
2023	Sofia Valdes	Silvia (EP)	"Wild"
2023	Sofia Valdes	Silvia (EP)	"Silvia"
2023	Sofia Valdes	Silvia (EP)	"Barbed Wire"
2023	thxsomuch	Sleez (EP)	"Screws"
2023	Ryan Beatty	Calico	"White Teeth"
2023	Ryan Beatty	Calico	"Bright Red"
2023	Bakar	Single	"Good News"
2023	Lous and The Yakuza	IOTA	"Lubie"
2022	SZA	SOS	"Notice Me"
2022	SZA	SOS	"Open Arms" (featuring Travis Scott)
2022	SZA	Ctrl (Deluxe)	"Awkward"
2022	Burna Boy	Love, Damini	"Love, Damini"
2022	Rosalía	Motomami	"Saoko"
2022	Rosalía	Motomami	"Candy"
2022	Rosalía	Motomami	"Chicken Teriyaki"
2022	Rosalía	Motomami	"Hentai"
2022	Rosalía	Motomami	"Bizcochito"
2022	Rosalía	Motomami	"G3 N15"
2022	Rosalía	Motomami	"Motomami"
2022	Rosalía	Motomami	"Delirio de Grandeza"
2022	Rosalía	Motomami	"La Combi Versace"
2022	Rosalía	Motomami	"Diablo"
2022	Rosalía	Motomami	"LA KILIÉ "
2022	Rosalía	Motomami	"LAX"
2021	Kenny Mason	Angelic Hoodrat: Supercut	"4ever"
2020	Omar Apollo	Apolonio	"Bi Fren"
2020	Omar Apollo	Apolonio	"I'm Amazing"
2019	Frank Ocean	Single	"Little Demon"
2019	Frank Ocean	Single	"In My Room"
2019	SiR	Chasing Summer	"Hair Down" (featuring Kendrick Lamar)
2019	Beyoncé	The Lion King: The Gift	"Brown Skin Girl" (with Saint Jhn & Wizkid, featuring Blue Ivy Carter)
2019	Beyoncé	The Lion King: The Gift	"Mood 4 Eva" (with Jay-Z & Childish Gambino)
2019	GoldLink	Diaspora	"Days Like This" (featuring Khalid)
2019	FKA Twigs	Magdalene	"Cellophane"
2018	Kelsey Lu	Single	"Due West"
2018	Anderson .Paak	Single	"Til It's Over"
2018	Jorja Smith	Lost & Found	"February 3rd"
2018	Ludwig Göransson	Black Panther: Wakanda Remixed	"Ancestral Plane"
2018	Choker	Honeybloom	"Drift" "Starfruit NYC" "Jet Stereo" "Daisy"
2018	Troye Sivan	Bloom	"Running Shoes"
2017	A$AP Mob	Cozy Tapes Vol. 2: Too Crazy	"RAF"
2017	Jesse Boykins III & Noname	Bartholomew	"Into You"
2017	Little Dragon	Single	"High (Michael Uzowuru & Jeff Kleinman Remix)"
2017	Rex Orange County	Apricot Princess	"Waiting Room"
2017	Frank Ocean	Single	"Chanel"
2016	Frank Ocean	Blonde	"Nights"
2016	Frank Ocean	Endless	"Rushes To"
2016	Kevin Abstract	American Boyfriend	"Empty" "Seventeen" "Blink" "Tattoo" "Yellow" "Kin" "Runner" "Papercut" "June 29th" "Miserable America" "Echo" "I Do"
2014	Vic Mensa	Single	"Major Payne"
2013	Vic Mensa	Innanetape	"Tweakin" (featuring Chance the Rapper) "Yap Yap"
2013	Earl Sweatshirt	Doris	"Pre"
2012	Domo Genesis	Single	"Crushed Velvet"
2012	Vince Staples	Winter in Prague	"Winter in Prague" "Lord" "SK La Sermon" "Twitch" "Waterpark" "Matlock" "Traffic" "SK Climactic" "Mattress" "Black Oprah"
2012	Vince Staples	Single	"Champagne Wishlist"
2011	Vince Staples	Generic	"Martin Ruger King" "Barreta Scott King" "Gold Chain Ricky" "Vicoden"
2011	Vince Staples	Shyne Goldchain Vol. 1	"Versace Rap"
2011	Domo Genesis	Single	"Cashmere"
2011	Domo Genesis	Under the Influence	"Mind Games"
2011	Hodgy Beats	Single	"April 27th"
2010	The Jet Age of Tomorrow	Journey to the 5th Echelon	"Want You Still" (featuring Kilo Kish)

=== Mixtapes and EPs ===
Year	Title	Notes
2014	Pink Orchids	
2012	Winter in Prague	with Vince Staples
2011	Paisley Palm Trees	
2010	Space is the Place	
2010	The Mellowest Trip	
2010	No Need for Sense	

=== Singles ===
Year	Title
2015	"Without You" (featuring Anderson .Paak)
2014	"April 13th" (featuring Vic Mensa)
