= Lonely Is the Muse =

2024 single by Halsey

Single by Halsey

from the album The Great Impersonator
- Released: August 15, 2024
- Genre: Alternative rock; grunge; gothic rock; hard rock
- Length: 4:01
- Label: Columbia
- Songwriters: Stuart Price; Halsey
- Producers: Austin Corona; Wyatt Bernard; Brandon Buttner

Halsey singles chronology
"Lucky" (2024)	"Lonely Is the Muse" (2024)	"Ego" (2024)

Visualizer
- "Lonely Is the Muse" on YouTube

"Lonely Is the Muse" is a song by the American singer Halsey from her fifth studio album, The Great Impersonator (2024). She wrote it with Stuart Price, while Austin Corona, Wyatt Bernard, and Brandon Buttner handled its production. Columbia Records released the song on August 15, 2024, as the album's second single. "Lonely Is the Muse" is an alternative rock, grunge, gothic rock, and hard rock song led by guitar and drums, with lyrics that focus on self-worth and resilience. Amy Lee of Evanescence inspired the track, whom Halsey impersonated as part of the album's promotion.

Upon its release, the song received a positive response from music critics, with praise towards its sound; NME listed it as one of the best songs from 2024. Commercially, it appeared on the New Zealand Hot Singles chart. A Vevo live performance for "Lonely Is the Muse" premiered on October 30, 2024. Halsey included the song in the regular set lists of For My Last Trick: The Tour (2025) and several festival appearances.

== Background and release ==
In June 2024, Halsey first previewed a new album with the release of "The End"; on the song, the singer revealed how she was informed of her lupus and T cell disorder diagnosis. The single "Lucky" followed in July. On August 14, 2024, she announced that she would be releasing "Lonely Is the Muse" as a single the following day in the morning. It was released through Columbia Records as scheduled. The cover artwork of the single depicts Halsey on top of a statue of the French journalist Victor Noir, a site which is supposed to represent fertility. It debuted on the New Zealand Hot Singles chart at number 22 on September 20, 2024.

On August 26, Halsey announced her fifth studio album, The Great Impersonator, conceived as a "confessional concept album". She revealed its track listing a month later, in which "Lonely Is the Muse" appears as the twelfth track. For the album's promotion, Halsey hosted a countdown on social media, in which she would be impersonating a different artist each day for a song they influenced; for "Lonely Is the Muse", she posted a video in tribute to Amy Lee of Evanescence. Lee responded the post saying, "High compliment coming from you, my dear". On November 1, the song was sent to Italian radio airplay by Sony Music Italy.

== Composition ==
"Lonely Is the Muse" has a duration of four minutes and one second. It was written by Halsey and Stuart Price, and produced by Austin Corona, Wyatt Bernard, and Brandon Buttner. Mark "Spike" Stent worked as the mixer, while Randy Merrill was in charge of its mastering. Kieran Beardmore and Matt Wolach were engineer assistants. Music critics categorized "Lonely Is the Muse" as an alternative rock, grunge, gothic rock, and hard rock song led by guitars and drums. They compared it to other works by Halsey from the genres, including her collaboration with Bring Me the Horizon titled "¿" (2019), her Birds of Prey soundtrack single "Experiment on Me" (2020), and her previous album If I Can't Have Love, I Want Power (2021), produced by Trent Reznor and Atticus Ross of Nine Inch Nails.

The lyrics of "Lonely Is the Muse" explores themes of self-worth and resilience. Halsey expresses about feeling used and struggling to find sincere love in other people. She wonders when she will reach joy, and expresses that she feels "reduced to just a body here in someone else's bed". The song is also a confrontation to the music industry and the expectations that society has placed upon her. In the chorus, Halsey compares herself to a martyr.

== Critical reception ==
Dork's Dan Harrison said that "Lonely Is the Muse" is "a powerful reminder of Halsey's place in the modern music landscape". Robin Murray of Clash described it as an "all-out crusher" and "a ready-made anthem for [Halsey's] titanic live shows". Shaad D'Souza from Pitchfork believed the verse starting with "I've inspired platinum records" is "sharp and witty, and it's also one of the most head-spinning passages in pop [in 2024]". John Amen of Beats Per Minute said that the song is "a condemnation of the way in which women are still conditioned to fit in, support, inspire, rather than claim their own trajectories". NME included "Lonely Is the Muse" on its list of the best songs of 2024, placing it at number 49; Emma Wilkes believed that Halsey "reasserts herself as the main character" on the track.

== Live performances ==
Halsey debuted "Lonely Is the Muse" at the Sziget Festival in Budapest, and later performed it at the Flow Festival in Helsinki and an intimate concert at Koko in London. At the first performance, she said: "For every Halsey pop song, there's a Halsey rock song to match". Stereogum's Tom Breihan described it as "lo-fi Evanescence". A Vevo live performance of "Lonely Is the Muse" premiered on October 30, 2024. A special edition of the album with the performance was released on the following day for 24 hours. On March 7, 2025, Halsey performed the track at the Sips and Sounds Festival in Austin, Texas. "Lonely Is the Muse" was included in the regular set list of For My Last Trick: The Tour, which began in May 2025; the song is part of the tour's second act, titled "The Show".

== Personnel ==
The credits shown below are adapted from Tidal.

- Halsey – lead vocals, songwriter
- Stuart Price – songwriter
- Austin Corona – producer
- Wyatt Bernard – producer
- Brandon Buttner – producer
- Mark "Spike" Stent – mixing
- Randy Merrill – mastering
- Kieran Beardmore – engineering assistance
- Matt Wolach – engineering assistance

== Charts ==
Chart performance for "Lonely Is the Muse"
Chart (2024)	Peak position
New Zealand Hot Singles (RMNZ)	22

== Release history ==
Release history and formats for "Lonely Is the Muse"
Region	Date	Format	Label	Ref.
Various	August 15, 2024	Digital download; streaming	Columbia	
Italy	November 1, 2024	Radio airplay	Sony Italy	
