= Lucky (Halsey song) =

2024 single by Halsey

Single by Halsey

from the album The Great Impersonator
- Released: July 26, 2024
- Genre: Teen pop
- Length: 3:19
- Label: Columbia
- Songwriters: Halsey; Michael Uzowuru; Max Martin; Rami Yacoub; Alexander Kronlund; Rhett Lawrence; Travon Potts
- Producers: Michael Uzowuru; Rahm Silverglade; Dylan Wiggins

Halsey singles chronology
"Lilith (Diablo IV Anthem)" (2023)	"Lucky" (2024)	"Lonely Is the Muse" (2024)

Music video
- "Lucky" on YouTube

"Lucky" is a song by the American singer Halsey from her fifth studio album, The Great Impersonator (2024). Columbia Records released it as the album's lead single on July 26, 2024. It interpolates the Britney Spears song of the same name (2000) in its chorus and the Monica song "Angel of Mine" (1998) in its production. Halsey wrote "Lucky" with Michael Uzowuru, who handled its production alongside Rahm Silverglade and Dylan Wiggins. Max Martin, Rami Yacoub, Alexander Kronlund, Rhett Lawrence, and Travon Potts also received songwriting credits as part of the interpolations.

Music critics categorized "Lucky" as a teen pop song with elements of R&B. Lyrically, it sees Halsey exploring themes of health issues and motherhood, as well as her relationship with fame. Some critics praised the lyrics while others believed it was below the expectations. Commercially, "Lucky" peaked at number 88 on the US Billboard Hot 100 and entered secondary charts in three other countries. Halsey performed the song as part of the set list of For My Last Trick: The Tour (2025), as well as at festival appearances.

A music video for "Lucky" premiered on the same date as the single's release. Written by Halsey and directed by Gia Coppola, it stars the singer as a 2000s pop star alongside a young girl who represents her inner child. It contains a cameo from Simon Rex and references Spears's "Lucky" as well as "Toxic" (2004). The video was initially criticized by Spears on social media, who expressed her displeasure, although she later deleted the comments and claimed it was fake news.

== Background and release ==
In June 2024, Halsey released the song "The End" and revealed she was "lucky to be alive" after being diagnosed with lupus and T-cell lymphoproliferative disorder in 2022. Halsey then announced that her fifth studio album was completed. Following the release of "The End", Halsey first teased "Lucky" on social media at the end of June 2024. She uploaded Y2K visuals featuring her wearing a pink wig. On July 1, she shared a video singing along to the song's chorus. She revealed that the track would interpolate the Britney Spears single "Lucky" (2000), and expressed her admiration: "When I was five, it always felt like [Spears] was singing directly to me". Other videos in promotion of "Lucky" included clips of Halsey acting as a Disney Channel star and a presenter for a Got Milk? advertisement.

On July 17, 2024, Halsey revealed that the song would be released on July 26 and shared its cover artwork, which depicts a blurry close-up of herself with sparkles. Replying to a fan via Twitter, she confirmed that she had Spears's "blessing" before releasing it. "Lucky" was released by Columbia Records as the first official single from the album. Sony Music sent it to Italian radio airplay on the same date. Halsey announced the album The Great Impersonator with a teaser featuring "Lucky" in the background. She performed it for the first time at the Sziget Festival 2024 in Budapest, Hungary. To promote The Great Impersonator, Halsey channeled several public figures who were part of the influences of its tracks; for "Lucky", she impersonated Spears in the cover artwork of In the Zone (2003). "Lucky" was included in the set list of For My Last Trick: The Tour, which began in May 2025, as part of the act titled "Alice Falls Down the Rabbit Hole".

== Composition ==
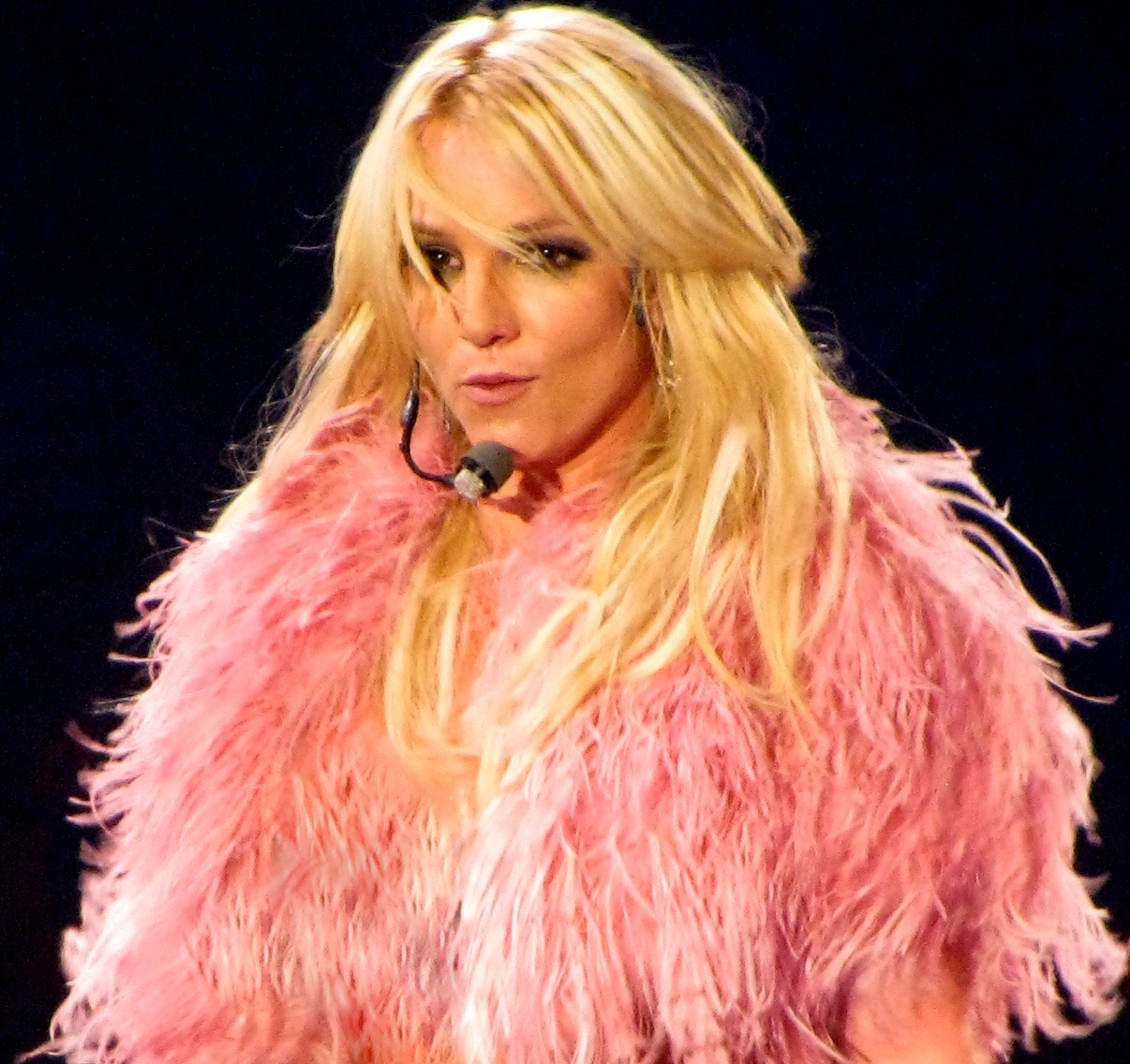
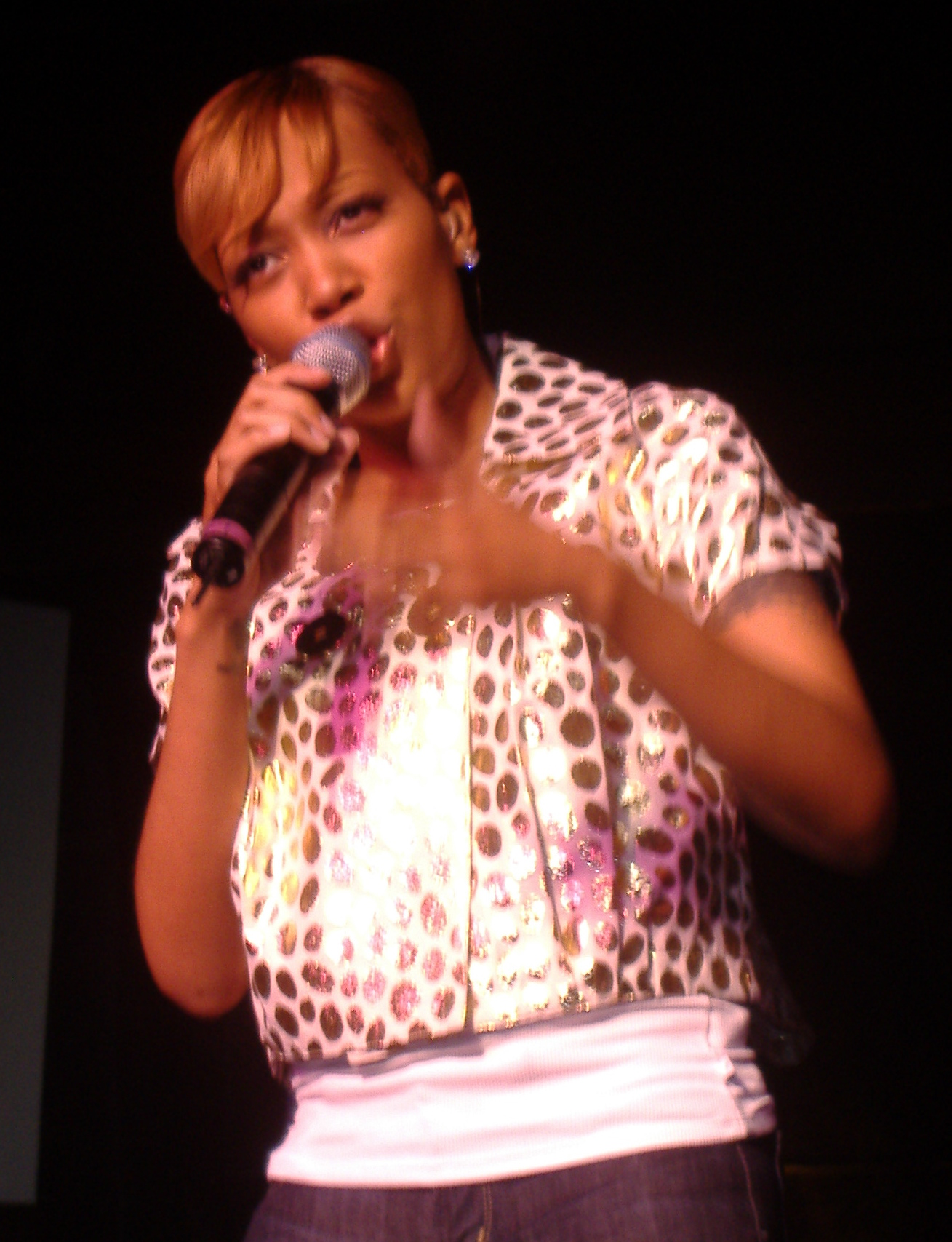
"Lucky" interpolates songs by Britney Spears (left) and Monica (right)

"Lucky" is 3 minutes and 18 seconds long. Halsey wrote the song with Michael Uzowuru, and the latter produced it with Rahm Silverglade and Dylan Wiggins. It interpolates Spears's song in its chorus and the Monica single "Angel of Mine" (1998) in its production. Consequently, Max Martin, Rami Yacoub, Alexander Kronlund, Rhett Lawrence, and Travon Potts also received songwriting credits. Brandon Buttner was an additional producer and Caleb Laven was the vocal producer. Sean Matsukawa and Caroline Whitaker served as the engineers, while Mark Stent was the mixing engineer.

"Lucky" has been described as a pop and teen pop song; Ilana Kaplan of People described it as "pop-meet-R&B-tinged". Lyrically, the song deals with Halsey's relationship with fame, health issues, and motherhood. She also addresses criticism of her appearance: "And why she losin' so much weight / I heard it's from the drugs she ate / And I feel her but I can't relate / Because I'd never end up in that state". The chorus's lyrics change the pronouns from those of Spears's "Lucky" to first-person. Halsey then announces that she shaved her head due to health issues ("I shaved my head four times because I wanted to / And then I did it one more time 'cause I got sick"), and how she became a single mother following her break-up with her ex.

== Reception ==
Nylon's Carson Mlnarik included "Lucky" on a list of the best music of its release week, and praised each "raw and aching line", which feels "like a story recounted to friends". In a mixed review for The A.V. Club, Mary Kate Carr wrote that the "confessional style of the song [...] doesn't do the song any favors to retread such familiar ground". She said that Halsey "has a little more grit and edge" than Spears did, but believed that it could have worked as a cover of the original track instead. Writing for The Line of Best Fit, Marie Oleinik felt that "Lucky" was "underwhelming", having "the subtlety of an amateur cover" after being heavily teased.

Commercially, "Lucky" debuted and peaked at number 88 on the US Billboard Hot 100 issued for August 10, 2024. It also appeared on the US Adult Pop Airplay chart at number 40. Additionally, the song reached secondary charts in three other countries, at number 12 on the Japan Hot Overseas and New Zealand Hot Singles charts, number 58 on the UK Singles Downloads Chart, and number 66 on the UK Singles Sales Chart.

== Music video ==
Halsey is seen wearing a crystal bodysuit in the music video, to parallel Spears's "Toxic" visual.

The music video for "Lucky", written by Halsey and directed by Gia Coppola, premiered on the same date as the single's release. It stars Halsey as a 2000s pop star and contains an appearance of Simon Rex as her love interest. The video depicts the behind-the-scenes of the pop star and her struggles with her personal life. The video begins with Halsey wearing a pink wig and a young girl who represents her inner child. Halsey is depicted arguing with Rex and later shows her shaved head while treating her illness. The video pays homage to Spears's music videos for "Lucky" and "Toxic" (2004) through Halsey's crystal bodysuit. At the end of the video, Halsey and the young girl meet at a playground swing set.

Following the release of the music video, Britney Spears initially posted a critical message on social media, expressing her displeasure. Spears felt that it misrepresented her experiences and stated she was "upset" about the depiction. However, Spears deleted the post shortly after and clarified that her reaction was taken out of context and labeled the initial reports as "fake news". Halsey responded by expressing her admiration for Spears and reiterated that the music video was meant to be a tribute to Spears's influence and legacy.

== Personnel ==
The credits shown below are adapted from Apple Music.

- Halsey – vocals, songwriter
- Michael Uzowuru – songwriter, producer
- Rahm Silverglade – producer
- Dylan Wiggins – producer
- Max Martin – songwriter
- Rami Yacoub – songwriter
- Alexander Kronlund – songwriter
- Rhett Lawrence – songwriter
- Travon Potts – songwriter
- Michael Uzowuru – songwriter
- Brandon Buttner – additional producer
- Caleb Laven – vocal producer
- Sean Matsukawa – engineer
- Caroline Whitaker – engineer
- Mark Stent – mixing engineer

== Charts ==
Chart performance for "Lucky"
Chart (2024)	Peak position
Japan Hot Overseas (Billboard Japan)	12
New Zealand Hot Singles (RMNZ)	12
UK Singles Downloads (Official Charts)	58
UK Singles Sales (OCC)	66
US Billboard Hot 100	88
US Adult Pop Airplay (Billboard)	40
