= Star Slinger =

British musician

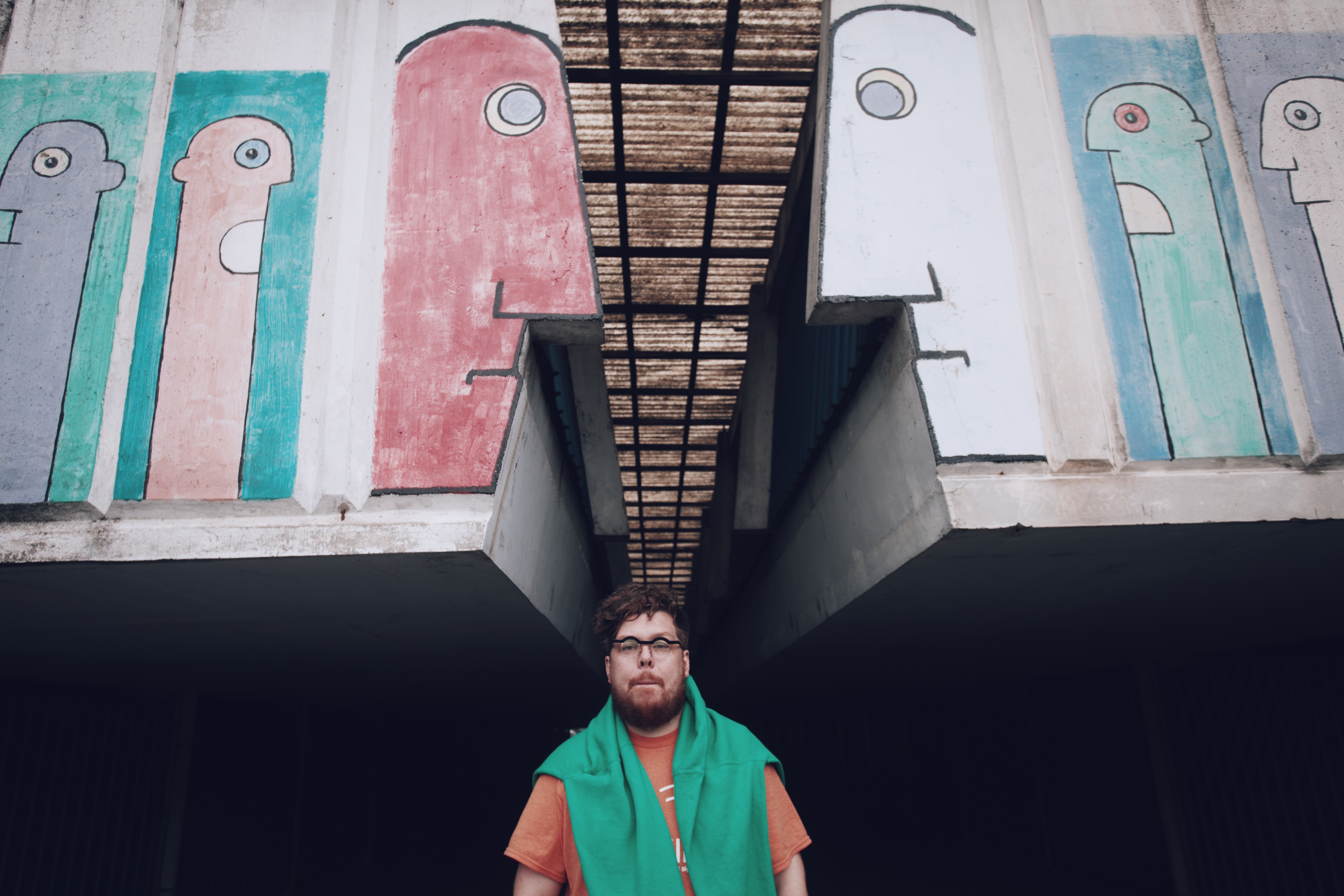
- Star Slinger in 2016

Background information
- Born: Darren Williams; 1986 (age 39–40); Nottingham UK
- Genres: Hip hop, house, electronic
- Occupations: Record producer, musician, dj
- Years active: April 2010–present
- Labels: Jet Jam, Owsla
- Website: starslinger.net

Star Slinger (born Darren Williams) is an electronic music producer and DJ based in Manchester, UK, taking influences mainly from house and hip hop. Star Slinger first came to attention after self-releasing a beat tape in the summer of 2010 entitled "Volume 1". Shortly after, Williams picked up noteworthy press interest from Pitchfork Media, SPIN Magazine, Dazed & Confused Magazine and was interviewed by Annie Mac on BBC Radio 1. He has collaborated with James Vincent McMorrow, Dawn Richard, Kilo Kish, Juicy J, Project Pat, Tunji Ige, Lil B, Sam Sparro, Stunnaman, Reggie B & Teki Latex alongside others. He has officially remixed for Jessie Ware, London Grammar, Duke Dumont, Childish Gambino, Ellie Goulding, Bipolar Sunshine, Hundred Waters (for Skrillex's Owsla label) and was selected by ASAP Rocky to open all shows on his 2012 European Tour. He also co-wrote & produced Kilo Kish "Goldmine" which featured on the Sundance Film Festival Award-winning film Dear White People.

== Musical career ==
Star Slinger curated an international club night under the name Jet Jam along with visual artists Anze Sekelj & Michaela Selmani. The night's programming puts an emphasis on eclecticism and no emphasis on BPM. Artists to have played the party include Bondax, Shlohmo & Baths (musician). The JET JAM logo was designed by Michaela Selmani.

In November 2012, Jet Jam released its first single in the form of Star Slinger "Ladies In The Back" (Feat. Teki Latex) on 12" vinyl & digital download formats. They have signed many new artists since then and rolled out Toronto-based act Harrison's "Colors" EP in Europe in collaboration with Toronto's Last Gang Records.

== Press quotes ==
"Best new act of the year by miles." – The Guardian

"Combines the hyper soul sampling of Kanye West or Dipset producers Heatmakerz with a bubbling psychedelia reminiscent of J Dilla's spacier moments." – Pitchfork Media

== Background ==
Williams is from Huthwaite in Nottinghamshire and studied music technology at Leeds Metropolitan University.

== Discography ==
=== Albums/EP's ===
- Being Kind (LP) [Self-released] (2022)
- Rogue Cho Pa (EP) [Self-released] (2019)
- Stranger ThAngs (W/ Stranger ThAngs & Laura Peñate) (EP) [Stranger ThAngs] (2018)
- Home Is Where We Start From (LP) [Self-released] (2018)
- First Love Music (LP) [4DG] (2018)
- We Could Be More (EP) Owsla (2016)
- Volume 2 (LP) Jet Jam (2016)
- Sketchy (EP) [Free Download] (2016)
- IV (EP) [Free Download] (2013)
- Ladies in the Back (Feat. Teki Latex) (Remixes) Jet Jam (2012)
- Teams vs. Star Slinger [Self-Titled] (EP) Mexican Summer (2011) (First 1000 copies were Ltd. Edition Clear Vinyl)
- Volume 1 (LP) [Self-released] (2010)
- Rogue Cho Pa (EP) [Self-released] (2011)

=== Singles ===
==== 2010s ====
Single	Year	Label
"Remedy (7")"	2011	Double Denim Records
"Dumbin'" (featuring Reggie B, Juicy J, Project Pat + Diplo Remix)	2011	Green Label Sound
"Take This Up"	2011	Self-released
"Ladies in the Back" (featuring Teki Latex)	2012	Jet Jam
"Darling"	2016	Jet Jam
"We Could Be More" (featuring Dawn Richard)	2016	OWSLA
"Yaya"	2017	Self-released
"Good Chance"	2017	Self-released
"Moja Mala"	2017	Self-released
"Together"	2017	Self-released
"Hottest Day in New York"	2017	Self-released
"Certi"	2017	Self-released
"Yaya"	2017	Self-released
"Win Hof Breathing Method"	2017	Self-released
"The First Thing You Picture When You Close Your Eyes"	2017	Self-released
"How Did I Find You?"	2017	Self-released
"A Singer in a Choir"	2017	Self-released
"Cats Come to Me"	2017	Self-released
"Lazy Afternoon"	2017	Self-released
"Hit Me (On My Socials)"	2017	Self-released
"If You're Not Jumping"	2017	Self-released
"Didn't Sell My Soul to Shoreditch"	2017	Self-released
"Choose Yourself"	2019	Self-released
"Self-Reliance"	2019	Self-released
"Mansions in the Sky"	2019	Self-released
"In Search of Lost Time"	2019	Self-released
"Always Be Motivated by Love"	2019	Self-released
"Greatness"	2019	Self-released
"10 & 2" (featuring ORANCHA, SCALLY)	2019	Self-released
"Too Late" (featuring ORANCHA, SCALLY)	2019	Self-released
"My Shoes" (featuring Some1Else, SCALLY)	2019	Self-released
"Peace Love Unity Respect"	2019	Self-released
"Wish I Had the Chance to Get to Know You"	2019	Self-released
"First Love Music (Remix)" (featuring Comfy Bella, SCALLY)	2019	Self-released
"So Fucking Perfect" (featuring Evie Rose, SCALLY)	2019	Self-released
"I Didn't Mean To Lead You On" (featuring SCALLY)	2019	4DG
"You're Enough" (featuring ORANCHA, SCALLY, Evie Rose)	2019	4DG
"Cut Price Pat" (featuring SCALLY)	2019	4DG
"Pass the Dutchie (Star Slinger Remix)" (featuring Musical Youth)	2019	Cleopatra Records

==== 2020s ====
Single	Year	Label
"I'm Not Boyfriend Material (I'd Rather Be Your Sideman)"	2020	Self-released
"Coldest Day In London"	2020	Self-released
"You Look Like Trouble"	2020	Self-released
"Let's All Get Divorced"	2020	Self-released
"Sideman"	2020	Self-released
"Baby (Star Slinger Remix)" (featuring Marlee Quirarte)	2020	Self-released
"Hot Nights in June" (featuring KINNOHA)	2020	Self-released
"Sweet Love Thing Remix" (featuring Marlee Quirarte)	2020	Self-released
"Sun-Dried" (featuring Charlie Belle)	2020	Self-released
"Hands on the Clock" (featuring Yessica Woahneil)	2020	Self-released
"We Were on a Break (Star Slinger Remix)" (featuring Nahirny)	2020	Nahirny
"The Meaning of Life"	2020	Self-released
"Flame In You" (featuring Yessica Woahneil)	2021	Self-released
"How You Do Anything Is How You Do Everything"	2021	Self-released
"happy fool"	2021	Self-released
"Spinback Together"	2021	Self-released
"Body Positivity"	2021	Self-released
"Truth"	2021	Self-released
"Light It Up" (featuring Yessica Woahneil)	2021	Self-released
"Late Bloomer" (featuring Yessica Woahneil)	2022	Self-released
"Japan"	2022	Self-released
"She's My Woman"	2022	Self-released
"La Chance"	2022	Self-released
"The Sad Part Is I Do Miss It"	2022	Self-released
"Broke & Fun"	2022	Self-released
"NEED SOMEBODY"	2022	Self-released
"BEING KIND IS NOT HARD"	2022	Self-released
"Persian Rug Rides R Us"	2022	Self-released
"Hopeless Romantic"	2022	Self-released
"Lowrider Capital Of The World"	2022	Self-released
"Guinness"	2022	Self-released
"Waiting On The Front Porch At 3AM"	2022	Self-released
"The Way You See The World"	2023	Self-released
"Tsunami Quivers"	2023	Self-released
"Time Moves Slow When You're Not Home"	2023	Self-released
