= Kilo Kish =

American singer-songwriter and artist (born 1990)

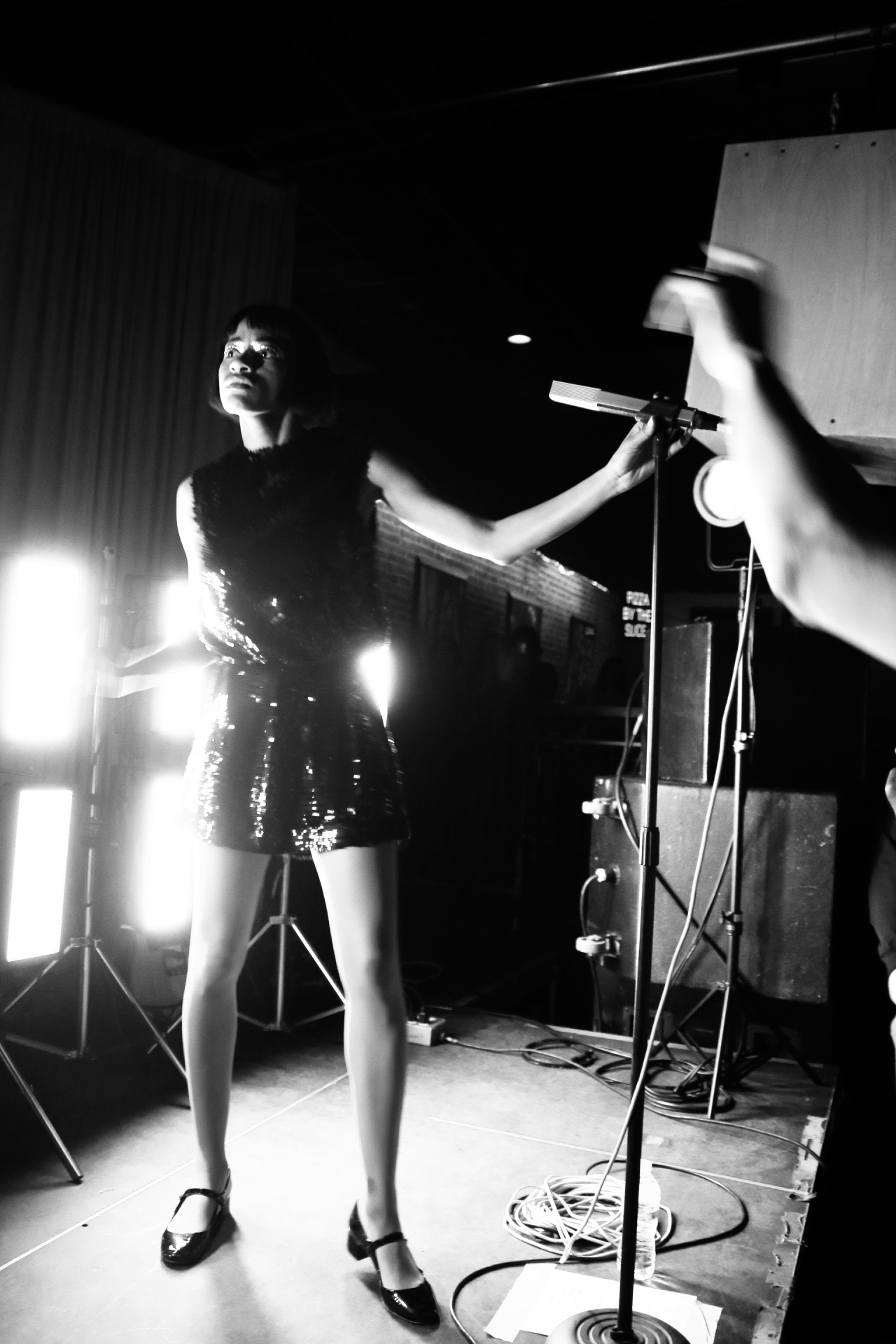
- Kish at the 2019 Chanel Cruise

Background information
- Also known as: Kilo Kish; Kish; KK
- Born: Lakisha Kimberly Robinson; May 10, 1990 (age 36); Orlando, Florida, U.S.
- Origin: Brooklyn, New York, U.S.
- Genres: Art pop; experimental pop; experimental hip hop; cloud rap; alternative R&B; synthpop; dance-pop
- Occupations: Singer; rapper; songwriter
- Years active: 2010–present
- Labels: Blacksmith; Universal; Kitsuné; Kisha Soundscape + Audio
- Website: kilokish.com

Lakisha Kimberly Robinson (born May 10, 1990), known professionally as Kilo Kish, is an American singer-songwriter and visual artist.

== Early life ==
Kilo Kish was born in Orlando, Florida, on May 10, 1990. She attended Glen Rock Elementary School in Bergen County, New Jersey, but later returned to Orlando, where she graduated from Winter Park High School.

Aged 18, she received a scholarship to attend the private art college Pratt Institute in New York. While taking a year off, she worked multiple jobs before enrolling in the Fashion Institute of Technology for textile design, from which she graduated in 2012.

Kish began to pursue a musical career when her roommates, Smash Simmons and Mell McCloud, decided to set up an in-home studio, starting a project called the "Kool Kats Klub". It was through this exposure that she initially met Matt Martians of the neo-soul band The Internet, and collaborated on The Jet Age of Tomorrow's "Want you Still" and The Internet's "Ode to a Dream".

== Career ==
=== 2012: Homeschool ===
Kilo Kish's debut EP, Homeschool, was released on April 2, 2012, and was well received by critics, being labeled as one of the best albums of 2012 by Complex. The EP was produced by past collaborators such as The Internet and Pyramid Vritra of The Jet Age of Tomorrow, who also provided guest vocals on the project.

On July 31, Kish released "Watergun", a song produced by The Internet, via SoundCloud.

On September 17, "Navy" was released on The Blue Rider record label. The release also contained a remix of "Navy" by MeLo-X. A video for "Navy", as directed by Kish with Ben Rayner, premiered on The Fader the same day.

=== 2013: K+ ===
Kish released the mixtape, K+ for free download on February 7, 2013. It featured artists including Childish Gambino, Star Slinger, SBTRKT, A$AP Ferg of A$AP Mob, Earl Sweatshirt, and Matt Martians of OFWGKTA. In December, Kish released K+ THE BOOK, a behind-the-scenes digital art zine, in extension to the mixtape.

=== 2014–2015: Across ===
Kish's second EP, Across, was released on July 8, 2014, in collaboration with the fashion and record label Maison Kitsune. In the following year, Kish released Across Remixes.

=== 2016: Reflections in Real Time ===
Kish's first studio album, Reflections in Real Time, was released on February 29, 2016. The song, "Taking Responsibility", from the album was featured in the third episode of the HBO teenage drama television show Euphoria.

=== 2017 ===
Kish features on "Out of Body" from the deluxe edition of the 2017 Gorillaz album Humanz as well as across the album Big Fish Theory by Vince Staples.

=== 2018: Mothe ===
Kish released the single, "Elegance", on August 26, 2018. Pitchfork named the song "Best New Track", with Sheldon Pearce commenting that "it is the best Kilo Kish song by a considerable margin, and it hones in on what makes her such an enchanting and elusive artist, using her wispy raps to drift through a warped pop jam." The release of her EP, mothe, followed on September 7, 2018. On July 29, 2019, Kish released an alternative artwork for mothe which has replaced the old artwork on all digital platforms. The cover was shot by photographer Andrew Arthur, with whom she has worked in the past.

=== 2019: Redux ===
Kish released three singles over the course of two months, beginning in October 2019. "Bite Me" was released on October 17, 2019, and its music video was made available on YouTube the next day. Kish's next singles, "Nice Out", and "Spark" were released on November 7, and November 26, 2019, respectively. All three singles released with accompanying music videos, and were featured on Kish's EP, Redux, released on December 6, 2019. Kish described Redux as 2018 Mothe's "sister project," and has stated that the EP explores the theme of perseverance. This is also Kish's fourth collaboration with recurring producer, Ray Brady.

=== 2021–2022: American Gurl ===
On July 23, 2021, Kish released "American Gurl", the first single from her album of the same name. The video for the song was directed by Kish herself and Matt Cowen. "Bloody Future" was made available on August 20, 2021, and on January 28, 2022, Kish released her collaboration with Vince Staples, "New Tricks: Art, Aesthetics, and Money". She explained that the track “was inspired by the old quote warning never to bite the hand that feeds you. And though it provides, I feel yanked around by the players, trends, and expectations of our age and industry. Ever-wanting to bite, question, and change.” On March 25, 2022, Kish released the full album with 14 tracks featuring Miguel, Jean Dawson, Vince Staples, and Jesse Boykins III.

== Discography ==
=== Studio albums ===
Title	Details
Reflections in Real Time	Released: February 29, 2016; Label: Kisha Soundscape + Audio; Formats: LP, digital download
American Gurl	Released: March 25, 2022; Label: Kisha Soundscape + Audio; Formats: LP, streaming

=== Mixtapes ===
Title	Details
K+	Released: February 7, 2013; Label: Self-released; Formats: Digital download

=== EPs ===
Title	Details	Peak chart positions
Title	Details	US Heat.
Homeschool	Released: April 2, 2012; Label: Self-released; Formats: Digital download	—
Across	Released: July 8, 2014; Label: Kitsuné; Formats: LP, digital download	44
Across Remixes	Released: January 12, 2015; Label: Kitsuné; Formats: Digital download	—
Mothe	Released: September 7, 2018; Label: Blacksmith; Formats: LP, digital download	—
Redux	Released: December 6, 2019; Label: Blacksmith Recordings; Formats: LP, digital download	—
Negotiations	Released: May 16, 2025; Label: Kisha Soundscape + Audio; Formats: LP, digital download	—
"—" denotes a recording that did not chart or was not released in that territory.

=== Singles ===
Title	Year	Album
"Watergun"	2012	Homeschool
"Navy"	2012	Homeschool
"Begin Route"	2014	Across
"Locket"	2014	Across
"Existential Crisis Hour"	2016	Reflections in Real Time
"Obsessing"	2017	Reflections in Real Time
"Fulfillment"	2017	Reflections in Real Time
"Self Importance"	2017	Reflections in Real Time
"Elegance"	2018	Mothe
"Void"	2018	Mothe
"Like Honey"	2019	Mothe
"Bite Me"	2019	Redux
"Nice Out"	2019	Redux
"Spark"	2019	Redux
"American Gurl"	2021	American Gurl
"Bloody Future"	2021	American Gurl
"New Tricks: Art, Aesthetics, and Money" (featuring Vince Staples)	2022	American Gurl
"No Apology!"	2022	American Gurl
"Death Fantasy" (featuring Miguel)	2022	American Gurl
"Reprogram"	2025	Negotiations
"Digital Emotional"	2025	Negotiations
"Negotiate" (featuring Miguel)	2025	Negotiations
"Enough"	2025	Negotiations

=== Music videos ===
List of music videos, showing year released, director(s), and album name
Music Video	Year	Director(s)	Album
"Navy"	2012	Ben Rayner & Kish Robinson	Homeschool
"Begin Route"	2014	Phillip T. Annand & Kish Robinson	Across
"Locket"	2014	Phillip T. Annand & Kish Robinson	Across
"Existential Crisis Hour"	2016	Kish Robinson, Brian Mitchell & Burke Doreen	Reflections in Real Time
"Hello, Lakisha"	2016	Yong oh Kim & Kish Robinson	Reflections in Real Time
"Obsessing"	2017	Elliot Sellers & Kish Robinson	Reflections in Real Time
"Fulfillment"	2017	Kish Robinson	Reflections in Real Time
"Elegance"	2018	Kish Robinson	Mothe
"Void"	2018	Elliot Sellers & Kish Robinson	Mothe
"Like Honey"	2019	Kish Robinson	Mothe
"Bite Me"	2019	Kish Robinson	Redux
"Nice Out"	2019	Kish Robinson	Redux
"Spark"	2019	Kish Robinson	Redux
"American Gurl"	2021	Kish Robinson & Matt Cowen	American Gurl
"Bloody Future"	2021	Kish Robinson	American Gurl
"Death Fantasy"	2022	Dave Laven & Kilo Kish	American Gurl
"TV Baby V.2 (Latch Key March)"	2022	Dave Laven & Kilo Kish	American Gurl
"Reprogram"	2025	Dave Laven & Kilo Kish	Negotiations

=== Guest appearances ===
List of guest appearances, with other performing artists, showing year released and album name
Title	Year	Artist(s)	Album
"Want You Still"	2010	The Jet Age of Tomorrow	Journey to the 5th Echelon
"Ode to a Dream"	2011	The Internet, Coco O.	Purple Naked Ladies
"Phat Wemin"	2011	Vince Staples	Shyne Coldchain Vol. 1
"Make It Go Right"	2012	Childish Gambino	Royalty
"JupiterSound"	2012	Flatbush Zombies	D.R.U.G.S
"Not So Scary"	2013	The Jet Age of Tomorrow	JellyFish Mentality
"II. Zealots of Stockholm (Free Information)"	2013	Childish Gambino	Because the Internet
"Melt"	2014	Chet Faker	Built on Glass
"Gripp"	2014	George Maple	Vacant Space
"Follow"	2015	Étienne de Crécy	Super Discount 3
"Dopeman"	2015	Vince Staples, Joey Fatts	Summertime '06
"Surf"	2015	Vince Staples	Summertime '06
"Jaco (Big Dope J Remix)"	2015	Nick Hook, Todd Edwards	Collage v.1 Remixes
"The Beginning"	2015	MeLo-X	Curate
"Loco"	2016	Vince Staples	Prima Donna
"Out of Body"	2017	Gorillaz, Zebra Katz, Imani Vonshà	Humanz
"Crabs in a Bucket"	2017	Vince Staples, Justin Vernon	Big Fish Theory
"Love Can Be..."	2017	Vince Staples, Damon Albarn, Ray J	Big Fish Theory
"Ramona Park is Yankee Stadium"	2017	Vince Staples	Big Fish Theory
"Homage"	2017	Vince Staples	Big Fish Theory
"Samo"	2017	Vince Staples, ASAP Rocky	Big Fish Theory
