= Homeschool (EP) =

EP by Kilo Kish
- Released: February 4, 2012
- Genre: Cloud rap; alternative R&B
- Length: 28:15
- Label: Self-released
- Producer: Pyramid Vritra; The Internet; KReam Team; Pyramid Murdock

Kilo Kish chronology
Homeschool (2012)	Across (2014)

Singles from Homeschool
- 1. "Navy" Released: April 2, 2012

Homeschool is the debut extended play by American musician, Kilo Kish. It was self-released on April 2, 2012, and supported by the single, "Navy".

== Background ==
Kilo Kish attended the Fashion Institute of Technology, graduating in 2012, and during this period she began to pursue a career as a musician. Kish's roommates had set up an in-home studio, and together they formed the musical project, "Kool Kats Klub", of which Kish was a member. Through this exposure, Kish met Matt Martians of The Internet, and they subsequently collaborated on the track "Ode to a Dream", from the Purple Naked Ladies album.

Kish's debut EP, Homeschool, was produced by Pyramid Vritra, and featured collaborations with Vritra, Speak!, and Vince Staples on the track "Julienne". The EP was released as a digital download on April 2, 2012, and was supported by the singles, "Watergun", released on July 31, and "Navy", the music video to which premiered on The Fader on September 17, 2012.

A remix of "Navy" by MeLo-X was also made available.

== Critical reception ==
Homeschool received generally positive reviews, and was labelled as one of the best albums of 2012 by Complex.

== Track listing ==
No.	Title	Producer(s)	Length
1.	"Good?"	Matt Martians	0:25
2.	"Navy"	Matt Martians & Syd	3:14
3.	"Sick"	Pyramid Murdock	4:12
4.	"Crosstown"	Matt Martians	2:26
5.	"Julienne" (featuring Vince Staples, Speak!, and Pyramid Vritra)	Matt Martians	3:06
6.	"Indigo / July"	KReam Team	4:20
7.	"You're Right"	Syd	2:12
8.	"Bus / Boy"	Matt Martians & Pyramid Vritra	2:37
9.	"TB70" (featuring Pyramid Vritra)	Pyramid Vritra	5:43
Total length:			28:15
