= The Great Impersonator =

- Standard cover

Studio album by Halsey
- Released: October 25, 2024
- Recorded: 2022–2024
- Studio: Electric Lady (New York City)
- Genre: Pop rock
- Length: 66:11
- Label: Columbia
- Producers: Alex G; Dylan Wiggins; Michael Uzowuru; Greg Kurstin; Wyatt Bernard; Austin Corona; Caleb Laven; Halsey; Evan Vidar; Gabe Simon; Tyler Johnson; Brandon Buttner; Rahm Silverglade; Emile Haynie

Halsey chronology
If I Can't Have Love, I Want Power (2021)	The Great Impersonator (2024)	Badlands (Decade Edition Anthology) (2025)

Singles from The Great Impersonator
- 1. "Lucky" Released: July 26, 2024; 2. "Lonely Is the Muse" Released: August 15, 2024; 3. "Ego" Released: September 6, 2024; 4. "I Never Loved You" Released: October 10, 2024

Deluxe edition cover

Singles from The Great Impersonator (Deluxe)
- 1. "Carry the Weight" Released: May 15, 2026

The Great Impersonator is the fifth studio album by American singer Halsey, released on October 25, 2024, by Columbia Records. Her first release with the label, Halsey conceived it as a confessional concept album believing it would be her last project after being diagnosed with lupus and a T cell lymphoproliferative disorder. It contains reflections about Halsey's personal struggles with life and death. It encompasses pop, folk, and subgenres of rock, with references to music from previous decades.

Halsey wrote and co-produced The Great Impersonator with several collaborators, including Alex G, Michael Uzowuru, Greg Kurstin, Tyler Johnson, and Emile Haynie. The album was initially teased with the promotional single "The End", which was followed by the singles "Lucky", "Lonely Is the Muse", "Ego", and "I Never Loved You". As part of the album's promotion, the singer impersonated musicians and public figures that inspired its songs. A deluxe edition of the album containing seven originally digitally-exclusive tracks was released on May 1, 2026.

Music critics received it positively; they praised the album's raw nature and honesty as well its eclectic sound. The Great Impersonator debuted at number two on the US Billboard 200 chart, becoming Halsey's fifth consecutive record to chart within the top two. It also reached the top 20 in Australia, Canada, Scotland, and the United Kingdom.

== Background and concept ==
I made this record in the space between life and death. And it feels like I've waited an eternity for you to have it. I'll wait a bit longer. I've waited a decade, already.

— Halsey, prior to the release of the album

The album's release was intended to be the same day as the anniversary of Room 93 (2014), though it was moved up by two days. It was recorded from 2022 to 2024 when she was struggling with her lupus and T-cell disorder diagnoses, as well as the birth of her son Ender. Halsey stated she believed it would "be the last album [she] ever made." Various producers have been credited between the three tracks released.

"Step right up, ladies and gentlemen! Behold the marvel of a century! Witness the uncanny ability of a woman who can become anyone, anything your heart desires. Friend, lover, foe. She transforms before your very eyes, her voice and visage a reflection of your deepest dreams and darkest fears but beware, for she is not just a master of disguise but a spirit of transformation, slipping between the cracks of reality. One moment a beloved friend, the next a shadowy nightmare. She is the queen of the uncanny, the mistress of metamorphosis. Beware of the great impersonator!"

— Halsey, The Great Impersonator synopsis

The album focuses on exploring Halsey's authenticity and relationships and her interpretation of their resonance with various contexts. This includes exploring how her music would have sounded in different decades, from the 1970s to the 2000s. Halsey expressed that, after her diagnoses, she felt detached from her body, as if she was "impersonating" herself, thus coming up with the concept and references for the album.

== Promotion and release ==
The album's trailer was released on August 27. A global scavenger hunt preceded the reveal of the album's primary and alternate cover arts corresponding to different decades on September 5. The album was first teased alongside the release of the promotional single, "The End" on June 4, 2024. This was followed by lead single "Lucky" on July 26, second single "Lonely Is the Muse" on August 15, and third single "Ego" on September 6. The fourth single "I Never Loved You" was released October 10. The album was released on October 25. A photo project on her social media also served as a countdown leading up the album's official release. On May 15, 2026, "Carry the Weight" became the deluxe edition's single.

=== Countdown ===
On October 7, Halsey initiated an 18-day countdown on social media for the album's release, with her releasing an Instagram image of herself "impersonating a different icon every day and teasing a snippet of the song they inspired" every day during that period. The artists and their respective inspired tracks were the following, released in this order:

- Dolly Parton, "Hometown"
- PJ Harvey, "Dog Years"
- Kate Bush, "I Never Loved You"
- Cher, "Letter to God (1974)"
- David Bowie, "Darwinism"
- Amy Lee of Evanescence, "Lonely Is the Muse"
- Dolores O'Riordan of the Cranberries, "Ego"
- Stevie Nicks, "Panic Attack"
- Bruce Springsteen, "Letter to God (1983)"
- Linda Ronstadt, "I Believe in Magic"
- Britney Spears, "Lucky"
- Herself as she appears on the cover of Badlands, "Hurt Feelings"
- Aaliyah, "Letter to God (1998)"
- Joni Mitchell, "The End"
- Fiona Apple, "Arsonist"
- Tori Amos, "Life of the Spider (Draft)"
- Björk, "The Great Impersonator"
- Marilyn Monroe, "Only Living Girl in LA"

== Composition and themes ==
Musically, The Great Impersonator has been described as a pop rock record that contains alternative rock, indie rock, folk, and pop songs. After being diagnosed with lupus and a lymphoproliferative (T-cell) disorder, the album contains reflections about topics such as Halsey's own death, her life trauma, her parents, and how her child would carry on without her. This concept is put through the lens of how Halsey's music would have sounded if she had debuted in the '70s, '80s, '90s or '00s, incorporating numerous musical references from those eras.

== Critical reception ==
Professional ratings
Aggregate scores
Source	Rating
AnyDecentMusic?	7.6/10
Metacritic	79/100
Review scores
Source	Rating
AllMusic	4/5 stars
Beats per Minute	85%
Clash	9/10
Dork	4/5 stars
Kerrang!	4/5
NME	5/5 stars
Rolling Stone	4/5 stars
Pitchfork	4.8/10
PopMatters	9/10
Slant Magazine	3.5/5 stars

According to the review aggregator Metacritic, The Great Impersonator received "generally favorable reviews" based on a weighted average score of 79 out of 100 from 14 critic scores.

Neil Z. Yeung of AllMusic wrote that, "mining her musical upbringing and honoring her myriad inspirations, Halsey comes full circle, connecting her own youth and innocence with intimate adult ruminations on parenthood, aging, and legacy." Yeung also dubbed the album "an engrossing homage to the figures that made her into the artist [...] that she has become herself." Writing for Beats per Minute, John Amen commented, "With The Great Impersonator, Halsey deftly wields the enticements of pop, all the while exploring ageless issues regarding self, suffering, and the pursuit of wholeness." Caitlin Chatterton of Clash wrote that the album "is both deeply personal and sharply relevant to wider pop culture, quietly contributing to conversations being had by, and about, Chappell Roan, as well as those that have followed the death of Liam Payne." According to Dork's Neive McCarthy, the album "is a power struggle of sorts, but one where vocalising these truths and documenting these experiences comes out as champion each time." Emma Wilkes of Kerrang! wrote, "It perhaps didn't have to be so lengthy ... however, its concept ... and ... its sheer emotional weight all serve to make this record special ... as a document of Halsey's survival."

NME's Kristen S. Hé thought that, "looking back through her recent catalogue, Manic is more stylistically diverse, If I Can't Have Love, I Want Power more musically ambitious, but The Great Impersonator is Halsey's most honest album—that is if you choose to believe her." Rob Sheffield of Rolling Stone opined that The Great Impersonator was "the bleakest music Halsey has ever made, and that's saying something". Sheffield further pointed out that "there's a constant tension between the playful wit in the music and the sluggish gloom of the vocals. But the best moments on The Great Impersonator come when the music wins out. Playing around with the past seems to shake up her imagination—and point her toward the future." Characterizing the album rollout as "one of the most unique [...] in recent memory" and pointing out a lack of commercial songs, Rachel R. Carroll of PopMatters concluded "this is not an album designed to be a chart-topper; it's a masterclass in the ways we use art to survive—which is to say, a masterclass in honesty." Slant Magazine's Sal Cinquemani thought that the singer's impersonations were flawed: "So what if the most prominent feature of a song attributed to Björk's impact on Halsey as an artist is a string sample obviously inspired by Enya's 'Orinoco Flow'? Nobody could ever mistake these songs for anyone's other than Halsey's." However, he ultimately praised the album; he thought that Halsey's "often obvious" references "rarely feel derivative".

In a negative review, writing for Pitchfork, Shaad D'Souza wrote that "much of The Great Impersonator does feel like it's designed to position Halsey as a tortured, singular artist". He went on to conclude that Halsey is "not great at channeling artists from eras gone by" nor is she "a particularly sharp assessor of modern celebrity. So what then? Is it enough, as The Great Impersonator so clearly wants us to believe it is, to say you've suffered for your art, and your fans, and call it a day?"

== Commercial performance ==
Upon release, The Great Impersonator debuted at number two on the US Billboard 200 with 93,000 album-equivalent units in its first week, which consisted of 81,000 copies sold and 12,000 streaming equivalent units accumulated. This became Halsey's fifth consecutive studio album to chart within the nation's top two.

== Track listing ==
The Great Impersonator track listing
No.	Title	Writer(s)	Producer(s)	Length
1.	"Only Living Girl in LA"	Ashley Frangipane; Alexander Giannascoli; Dylan Wiggins; Michael Uzowuru	Alex G; Wiggins; Uzowuru; Halsey^{[a]}	6:14
2.	"Ego"	Frangipane; Greg Kurstin; Gregory Hein	Kurstin; Wyatt Bernard; Uzowuru; Austin Corona; Caleb Laven^{[v]}	3:18
3.	"Dog Years"	Frangipane; Kurstin; Uzowuru; Stuart Price	Kurstin; Uzowuru; Halsey^{[a]}; Teo Halm^{[a]}	4:03
4.	"Letter to God (1974)"	Frangipane	Laven; Halsey	2:11
5.	"Panic Attack"	Frangipane; Price; Robin Weisse	Corona; Bernard	3:36
6.	"The End"	Frangipane	Halsey; Uzowuru; Alex G; Laven^{[v]}	3:17
7.	"I Believe in Magic"	Frangipane; Ender Ridley; Uzowuru	Evan Vidar; Uzowuru	4:48
8.	"Letter to God (1983)"	Frangipane	Alex G; Laven; Halsey	1:53
9.	"Hometown"	Frangipane; Price	Alex G; Wiggins; Gabe Simon; Uzowuru; John Cunningham^{[a]}; Carrie K^{[a]}	3:24
10.	"I Never Loved You"	Frangipane; Uzowuru; Tyler Johnson	Uzowuru; Johnson	4:09
11.	"Darwinism"	Frangipane; Price	Corona; Bernard; Alex G^{[a]}; Halsey^{[a]}; Price^{[a]}	3:45
12.	"Lonely Is the Muse"	Frangipane; Price	Corona; Bernard; Brandon Buttner	4:01
13.	"Arsonist"	Frangipane; Uzowuru; Rahm Silverglade; Price	Halsey; Uzowuru; Silverglade^{[a]}; Thelonious Martin^{[a]}	4:38
14.	"Life of the Spider (Draft)"	Frangipane	Halsey	3:30
15.	"Hurt Feelings"	Frangipane; Wiggins; Uzowuru; Johnson	Wiggins; Uzowuru; Johnson	3:54
16.	"Lucky"	Frangipane; Uzowuru; Max Martin; Alexander Kronlund; Rami Yacoub; James Everett Lawrence; Travon Potts	Uzowuru; Silverglade; Wiggins; Buttner^{[a]}; Laven^{[v]}	3:18
17.	"Letter to God (1998)"	Frangipane; Ridley; Silverglade	Halsey; Silverglade	2:50
18.	"The Great Impersonator"	Frangipane; Price	Emile Haynie; Uzowuru	3:22
Total length:				66:11

Deluxe edition bonus disc
No.	Title	Writer(s)	Producer(s)	Length
1.	"Lucid"	Frangipane; Jordan Fish	Fish	3:20
2.	"Carry the Weight"	Frangipane; Fish; Zakk Cervini	Corona; Bernard	3:09
3.	"Lessons"	Frangipane; Hein; Kurstin	Kurstin	3:46
4.	"Afraid of the Dark" (demo)	Frangipane; Price	Price	4:17
5.	"Alice of the Upper Class"	Frangipane; Cunningham	Corona; Bernard	3:22
6.	"Nothing!"	Frangipane; Cunningham	Cunningham	2:22
7.	"Charades"	Frangipane; Cunningham; Giannascoli	Alex G	3:39

Notes

- ^{^[a]}signifies an additional producer
- ^{^[v]}signifies a vocal producer
- "Alice of the Upper Class" was originally the bonus track for Y2K edition of the album, released during the album's first tracking week. It was later added to the standard album on the digital platforms.
- "Nothing!" was originally the bonus track for 90s edition of the album, released during the album's first tracking week.
- "Lessons" was originally the bonus track for 80s edition of the album, released during the album's first tracking week.
- "Charades" was originally the bonus track for 70s edition of the album, released during the album's first tracking week.
- "Afraid of the Dark" was originally released as the bonus track on the first digital exclusive edition.
- The second digital exclusive edition featured the stripped versions of "Lucky" and "Hometown"; the latter was recorded at Vevo.
- The third digital exclusive edition featured the Vevo live recordings of "Panic Attack", "Ego" and "Lonely is the Muse".
- "Lucky" contains an interpolation of "Lucky" (2000), written by Max Martin, Rami Yacoub and Alexander Kronlund, as performed by Britney Spears; and an interpolation of "Angel of Mine" (1998), written by Rhett Lawrence and Travon Potts, as performed by Monica; which itself is a cover of "Angel of Mine" (1997), written by Lawrence and Potts, as performed by Eternal.

== Personnel ==
=== Musicians ===
- Halsey – vocals
- Dylan Wiggins – drums (track 2), keyboards (6)
- Alex G – guitar (tracks 2, 6)
- Austin Corona – guitar (tracks 2, 6)
- Greg Kurstin – bass, drums, electric guitar, percussion (track 2)
- Michael Uzowuru – keyboards (track 2)
- Wyatt Bernard – keyboards (track 2)

=== Technical ===
- Randy Merrill – mastering (tracks 2, 6, 12, 16)
- Mark "Spike" Stent – mixing (2, 6, 12, 16)
- Caroline Whitaker – engineering (tracks 2, 16), engineering assistance (6)
- Greg Kurstin – engineering (track 2)
- Julian Burg – engineering (track 2)
- Matt Tuggle – engineering (track 2)
- Sean Matsukawa – recording (tracks 2, 6)
- Konrad Snyder – recording (track 9)
- Brandon Buttner – vocal engineering (2)
- Kieran Beardmore – engineering assistance (tracks 2, 6, 12, 16)
- Matt Wolach – engineering assistance (tracks 2, 6, 12, 16)

== Charts ==
Chart performance for The Great Impersonator
Chart (2024)	Peak position
Australian Albums (ARIA)	17
Austrian Albums (Ö3 Austria)	51
Belgian Albums (Ultratop Flanders)	54
Belgian Albums (Ultratop Wallonia)	167
Canadian Albums (Billboard)	20
Croatian International Albums (HDU)	9
Dutch Albums (Album Top 100)	68
French Albums (SNEP)	178
German Albums (Offizielle Top 100)	28
Irish Albums (IRMA)	76
Italian Albums (FIMI)	98
New Zealand Albums (RMNZ)	33
Polish Albums (ZPAV)	75
Portuguese Albums (AFP)	29
Scottish Albums (Official Charts)	13
Spanish Albums (PROMUSICAE)	23
UK Albums (Official Charts)	19
US Billboard 200	2
