= The End (Halsey song) =

2024 promotional single by Halsey

Promotional single by Halsey

from the album The Great Impersonator
- Released: June 4, 2024
- Genre: Folk; indie folk
- Length: 3:17
- Label: Columbia Records
- Songwriter: Halsey
- Producers: Halsey; Alex G; Michael Uzowuru

Lyric video
- "The End" on YouTube

"The End" is a song by the American singer Halsey from her fifth studio album, The Great Impersonator. Halsey wrote and produced the song with Alex G and Michael Uzowuru. Columbia Records released it as a promotional single on June 4, 2024. In conjunction with the track's release, the singer made donations to Lupus Research Alliance and The Leukemia & Lymphoma Society.

"The End" combines acoustic music, folk, and indie folk over an acoustic-guitar-driven balladic production inspired by Joni Mitchell. The lyrics are about the singer's struggles resulting from ailments and the sense of safety, and security found in her lover.

== Background and release ==
Before the first single comes, I wanted to share this. It means a lot to me and I love it. Let's try something different this time and start at "The End"

— Halsey introducing "The End", Billboard

From the start of her career, Halsey has been open about her health issues. In 2022, the singer was diagnosed with Ehlers–Danlos syndrome, Sjögren syndrome, mast cell activation syndrome, and POTS (postural orthostatic tachycardia syndrome). The same year, Halsey was diagnosed with lupus and T-cell disorder.

On April 15, 2023, Variety announced that the singer had parted ways with Capitol Records. On June 14, 2023, it reported that Halsey had signed to Columbia Records.

On September 22, 2023, Halsey teased upcoming music with an Instagram post, stating she's "splitting [herself] in two every day" to give her fans "deepest wounds" and "a handful of perfect joys". On January 27, 2024, the singer shared a link to a website called "For My Last Trick", containing various Easter eggs and details related to her new album. In March, Halsey posted a sinppet of new music and revealed that she was in the studio with an American producer Alex G. On May 30, Halsey teased "The End" on the "For My Last Trick" website with a sticker that portrayed a woman getting an X-ray of her heart as a doctor looks it over. The song was announced on the same website on June 3, and released the following day. In conjunction with the songs's release, the singer made donations to Lupus Research Alliance and The Leukemia & Lymphoma Society.

== Composition ==
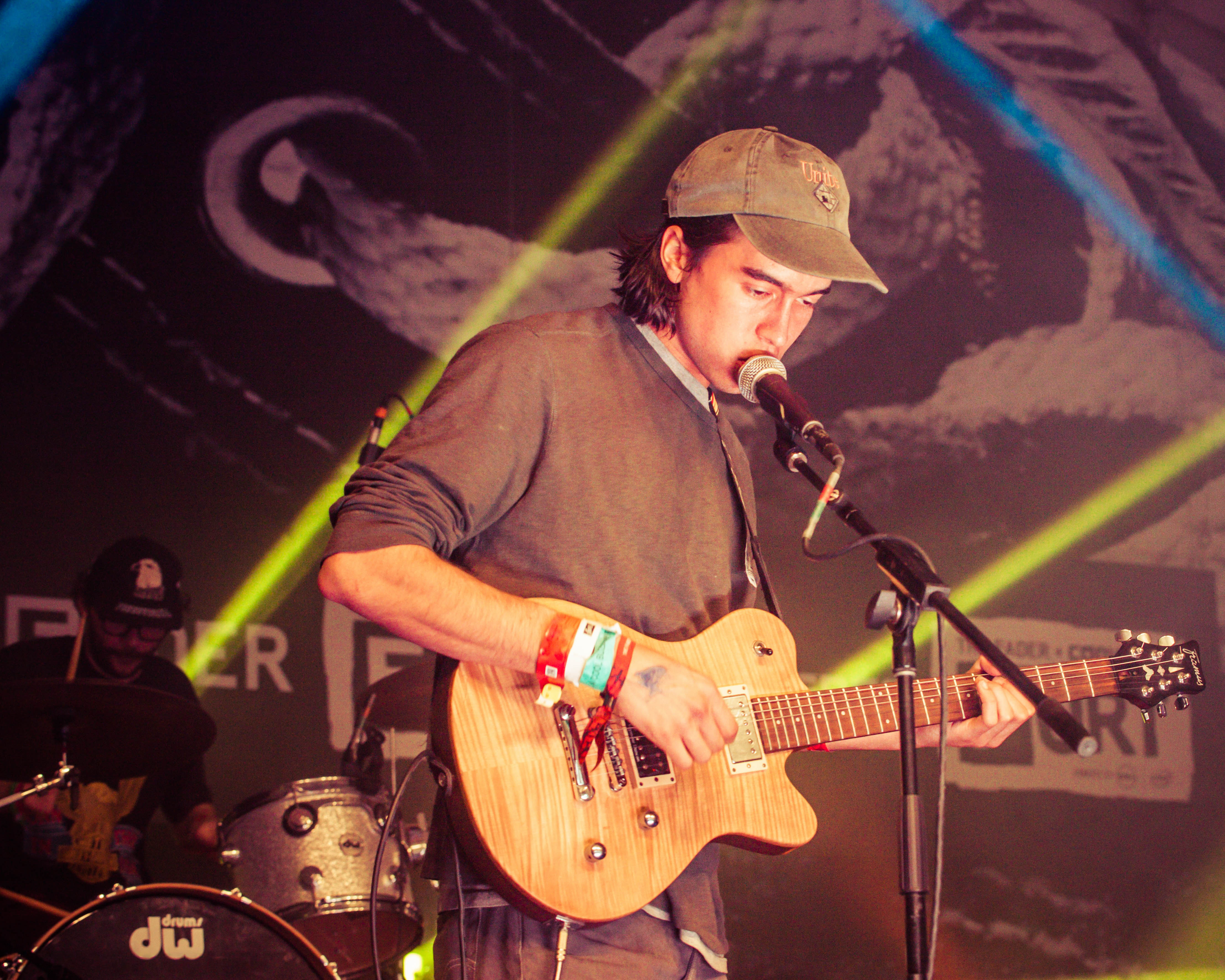
Alex G co-produced "The End".

The track was solely written by Halsey and produced by her, Alex G, and Michael Uzowuru. Alex G is also credited as a guitarist. "The End" is a minimalistic acoustic, folk, and indie folk ballad that features the singer's "raw" vocals and an acoustic guitar. Lyrically, the track focuses on the singer's health struggles and topics of existentialism.

Rania Aniftos of Billboard described the track as an "emotionally naked unplugged single". Grammy's Morgan Enos, called the song "brutally honest" and" detail-stuffed". He also stated that it is "the most personal, and risk-taking, singles Halsey has ever penned".

In the song's prechorus and chorus, the narrator portrays the feeling of love that "is healing and transcends the body's limits". Furthermore, the singer describes several visits to the doctor, feeling like "the end of the world" is imminent, and that "there's poison in my brain and in my blood".

The second verse describes Halsey talking to her doctor and telling them "I'm not bitter 'cause I finally found a lover/Who's better for my liver, and now I'll finally recover". The song ends with the singer "address[ing] her own mortality" and "a suggestion that [she] is not nearly done fighting", "When I met you, I said I would never die/ But the joke was always mine 'cause I'm racing against time/ And I know it's not the end of the world, but could you pick me up at eight?/ 'Cause my last treatment starts to day".

== Credits and personnel ==
Personnel

- Halsey – vocals, songwriter, producer
- Alex G – producer, guitar
- Michael Uzowuru – producer
- Randy Merrill – mastering engineer
- Mark Stent – mixing engineer
- Caroline Whitaker – assistant engineer
- Matt Wolach – assistant engineer
- Kieran Beardmore – assistant engineer
- Sean Matsukawa – recording engineer
- Caleb Laven – vocal producer
- Sir Dylan – keyboard
