= Hopeless Fountain Kingdom Tour =

2017–18 concert tour by Halsey

- World tour by Halsey
- Associated album: Hopeless Fountain Kingdom
- Start date: September 29, 2017
- End date: September 22, 2018
- Legs: 7
- No. of shows: 69
- Supporting acts: PartyNextDoor; Charli XCX; Cashmere Cat; Kehlani; Lauren Jauregui; NF; Logic; Jessie Reyez; Sasha Sloan; Chelsea Cutler; 070 Shake; NIKI; Raye; Alma

Halsey concert chronology
- Badlands Tour (2015–2016); Hopeless Fountain Kingdom Tour (2017–2018); Manic World Tour (2020)

The Hopeless Fountain Kingdom World Tour was the second headlining concert tour by American singer-songwriter Halsey, in support of her (Note: Halsey uses both she/her and they/them pronouns and switches between them; this article uses she/her pronouns for consistency.) second studio album Hopeless Fountain Kingdom (2017). The tour began on September 29, 2017, in Uncasville, Connecticut, at the Mohegan Sun Arena and concluded on September 26, 2018, in Berlin, Germany, at Columbiahalle. In 2017, the tour grossed $9.2 million from 28 shows with 340,983 tickets sold across North America.

Halsey announced "Installment I" of the tour, the North American leg, on May 5, 2017, about a month before the release of Hopeless Fountain Kingdom. Along with this announcement Halsey commented "this is the biggest tour I've ever done. and I'm gonna bring u the biggest show to go with it", and revealed that Canadian rapper PartyNextDoor and British singer Charli XCX would serve as opening acts. Tickets for the North American leg of the tour went on sale to the general public on May 12, 2017. Various VIP ticket options called "Angelus", "Aureum", "Solis" and "Luna" were also made available. On December 13, 2017 Halsey announced five shows in Oceania as "Installment II" of the tour; these shows took place in April 2018, and were supported by Kehlani. More shows were added as "The Final Installment" with shows in North America, Asia and Europe including support from Lauren Jauregui, Jessie Reyez, NIKI, Alma and Raye.

== Set list ==
This set list is representative of the show on October 31, 2017, in Phoenix, Arizona.

1. "The Prologue" (intro) (contains elements of "Hold My Liquor")
2. "Eyes Closed"
3. "Hold Me Down"
4. "Castle"
5. "Good Mourning" (interlude)
6. "Heaven in Hiding"
7. "Strangers"
8. "Roman Holiday"
9. "Walls Could Talk"
10. "Bad at Love"
11. "Alone"
12. "Closer"
13. "Sorry"
14. "Angel on Fire"
15. "Lie"
16. "Don't Play"
17. "Ghost"
18. "Is There Somewhere"
19. "Now or Never"
20. "Colors"
21. "Young God"

Encore

1. "Hopeless" (video interlude)
2. "Gasoline"
3. "Hurricane"

== Shows ==
List of 2017 concerts showing date, city, country, venue, opening acts, tickets sold, number of available tickets and amount of gross revenue
Date	City	Country	Venue	Opening act(s)	Attendance	Revenue
September 29, 2017	Uncasville	United States	Mohegan Sun Arena	PartyNextDoor; Charli XCX	5,566 / 5,566	$484,874
October 4, 2017	Toronto	Canada	Air Canada Centre	PartyNextDoor; Charli XCX	7,188 / 7,188	$369,089
October 6, 2017	Boston	United States	TD Garden	PartyNextDoor; Charli XCX	7,872 / 8,059	$387,372
October 7, 2017	Philadelphia	United States	Wells Fargo Center	PartyNextDoor; Charli XCX	7,651 / 8,368	$354,150
October 9, 2017	Washington, D.C.	United States	Capital One Arena	PartyNextDoor; Charli XCX	—N/a	—N/a
October 10, 2017	Pittsburgh	United States	PPG Paints Arena	PartyNextDoor; Charli XCX	5,657 / 7,116	$237,265
October 13, 2017	Brooklyn	United States	Barclays Center	PartyNextDoor; Charli XCX	8,182 / 9,486	$528,302
October 14, 2017	Newark	United States	Prudential Center	PartyNextDoor; Charli XCX	6,697 / 9,008	$404,945
October 17, 2017	Charlotte	United States	Spectrum Center	PartyNextDoor; Charli XCX	6,282 / 8,966	$304,600
October 19, 2017	Duluth	United States	Infinite Energy Arena	PartyNextDoor; Charli XCX	6,172 / 6,927	$359,441
October 21, 2017	Sunrise	United States	BB&T Center	PartyNextDoor; Charli XCX	7,188 / 7,188	$321,990
October 22, 2017	Orlando	United States	Amway Center	PartyNextDoor; Charli XCX	5,485 / 7,827	$297,028
October 25, 2017	Houston	United States	Toyota Center	PartyNextDoor; Charli XCX	6,153 / 7,224	$284,298
October 26, 2017	Dallas	United States	American Airlines Center	PartyNextDoor; Charli XCX	7,414 / 7,414	$393,809
October 27, 2017	Austin	United States	Frank Erwin Center	PartyNextDoor; Charli XCX	5,684 / 8,827	$322,555
October 29, 2017	Denver	United States	Pepsi Center	PartyNextDoor; Charli XCX	7,726 / 8,300	$326,171
October 31, 2017	Phoenix	United States	Talking Stick Resort Arena	PartyNextDoor; Charli XCX	—N/a	—N/a
November 3, 2017	Inglewood	United States	The Forum	PartyNextDoor; Charli XCX	9,419 / 10,423	$433,910
November 4, 2017	Anaheim	United States	Honda Center	PartyNextDoor; Charli XCX	9,726 / 13,068	$475,368
November 5, 2017	San Diego	United States	Viejas Arena	PartyNextDoor; Charli XCX	—N/a	—N/a
November 7, 2017	Oakland	United States	Oracle Arena	PartyNextDoor; Charli XCX	6,237 / 6,237	$366,291
November 10, 2017	Seattle	United States	KeyArena	PartyNextDoor; Charli XCX	—N/a	—N/a
November 11, 2017	Vancouver	Canada	Rogers Arena	Cashmere Cat	6,113 / 6,960	$276,924
November 18, 2017	Saint Paul	United States	Xcel Energy Center	PartyNextDoor; Charli XCX	—N/a	—N/a
November 19, 2017	Rosemont	United States	Allstate Arena	PartyNextDoor; Charli XCX	—N/a	—N/a
November 21, 2017	Detroit	United States	Little Caesars Arena	PartyNextDoor; Charli XCX	7,927 / 7,945	$376,120
November 22, 2017	Cleveland	United States	Wolstein Center	PartyNextDoor; Charli XCX	5,882 / 5,882	$300,837

List of 2018 concerts showing date, city, country, venue, opening acts, tickets sold, number of available tickets and amount of gross revenue
Date	City	Country	Venue	Opening act(s)	Attendance	Revenue
April 19, 2018	Auckland	New Zealand	Spark Arena	Kehlani	—N/a	—N/a
April 21, 2018	Melbourne	Australia	Margaret Court Arena	Kehlani	—N/a	—N/a
April 22, 2018	Sydney	Australia	Hordern Pavilion	Kehlani	9,239 / 10,671	$613,165
April 24, 2018	Perth	Australia	HBF Stadium	Kehlani	—N/a	—N/a
April 26, 2018	Sydney	Australia	Hordern Pavilion	Kehlani	(Note: This box office score data is representative of both shows at the Hordern Pavilion on April 22 and 26 respectively.)	
April 27, 2018	Brisbane	Australia	Riverstage	Kehlani	—N/a	—N/a
May 19, 2018 (Note: The concert on May 19, 2018 in Gulf Shores is part of Hangout Music Festival.)	Gulf Shores	United States	Gulf Shores Public Beaches	—N/a	—N/a	—N/a
May 27, 2018 (Note: The concert on May 27, 2018 in Napa is part of BottleRock Napa Valley.)	Napa	United States	Napa Valley Expo	—N/a	—N/a	—N/a
June 2, 2018 (Note: The concert on June 2, 2018 in New York City is part of Governors Ball Music Festival.)	New York City	United States	Randall's Island	—N/a	—N/a	—N/a
June 6, 2018	São Paulo	Brazil	Espaço das Américas	Lauren Jauregui	—N/a	—N/a
June 7, 2018	Rio de Janeiro	Brazil	Vivo Rio	Lauren Jauregui	—N/a	—N/a
June 9, 2018	Buenos Aires	Argentina	Teatro Gran Rex	Lauren Jauregui	—N/a	—N/a
June 12, 2018	Santiago	Chile	Teatro Caupolicán	Lauren Jauregui	—N/a	—N/a
June 15, 2018	Mexico City	Mexico	Pepsi Center	Lauren Jauregui	—N/a	—N/a
June 24, 2018 (Note: The concert on June 24, 2018 in Heber City is part of Bonanza Campout Music Festival.)	Heber City	United States	River's Edge	—N/a	—N/a	—N/a
June 29, 2018 (Note: The concert on June 29, 2018 in Milwaukee is part of Summerfest.)	Milwaukee	United States	American Family Insurance Amphitheater	NF; Logic	—N/a	—N/a
July 6, 2018 (Note: The concert on July 6, 2018 in Lansing is part of Common Ground Music Festival.)	Lansing	United States	Louis Adado Riverfront Park	Jessie Reyez	—N/a	—N/a
July 8, 2018	Montreal	Canada	M Telus	Sasha Sloan	2,254 / 2,254	$85,944
July 11, 2018	East Providence	United States	Bold Point Pavilion	Jessie Reyez	—N/a	—N/a
July 12, 2018	Saratoga Springs	United States	Saratoga Performing Arts Center	Jessie Reyez	—N/a	—N/a
July 14, 2018	Atlantic City	United States	Borgata Event Center	Chelsea Cutler	—N/a	—N/a
July 15, 2018	Wolf Trap	United States	Filene Center	Jessie Reyez	—N/a	—N/a
July 17, 2018	Indianapolis	United States	Farm Bureau Insurance Lawn	Jessie Reyez	—N/a	—N/a
July 18, 2018	Nashville	United States	Ascend Amphitheater	Jessie Reyez	—N/a	—N/a
July 20, 2018	Rogers	United States	Walmart Arkansas Music Pavilion	Jessie Reyez	—N/a	—N/a
July 21, 2018	Independence	United States	Silverstein Eye Centers Arena	Jessie Reyez	—N/a	—N/a
July 25, 2018	Troutdale	United States	McMenamins Edgefield	Jessie Reyez	—N/a	—N/a
July 27, 2018	Mountain View	United States	Shoreline Amphitheatre	Jessie Reyez	—N/a	—N/a
July 28, 2018	Las Vegas	United States	Pearl Concert Theater	Jessie Reyez	—N/a	—N/a
July 30, 2018	Morrison	United States	Red Rocks Amphitheatre	070 Shake	—N/a	—N/a
August 3, 2018	Honolulu	United States	Blaisdell Arena	Lauren Jauregui	—N/a	—N/a
August 6, 2018	Seoul	South Korea	YES 24 Live Hall	NIKI	—N/a	—N/a
August 8, 2018	Singapore		The Star Performing Arts Centre	NIKI	—N/a	—N/a
August 10, 2018	Quezon City	Philippines	New Frontier Theater	NIKI	—N/a	—N/a
August 11, 2018 (Note: The concert on August 11, 2018 in Jakarta is part of On-Off Festival.)	Jakarta	Indonesia	Gandaria City	NIKI	—N/a	—N/a
September 17, 2018	Madrid	Spain	La Riviera	Raye	—N/a	—N/a
September 19, 2018	Paris	France	L'Olympia	Raye	2,824 / 2,824	—N/a
September 20, 2018	Brussels	Belgium	Ancienne Belgique	Raye	—N/a	—N/a
September 22, 2018	London	England	Eventim Apollo	Raye; Alma	10,000 / 10,000	—N/a
September 23, 2018	London	England	Eventim Apollo	Raye; Alma	10,000 / 10,000	—N/a
September 25, 2018	Amsterdam	Netherlands	AFAS Live	Raye	—N/a	—N/a
September 26, 2018	Berlin	Germany	Columbiahalle	Raye	—N/a	—N/a
Total					157,714 / 189,731 (83%)	$8,304,448

=== Cancelled shows ===
List of cancelled concerts showing date, city, country, venue and reason for cancellation
Date	City	Country	Venue	Reason
October 3, 2017	Montreal	Canada	Bell Centre	Unforeseen production constraints
November 14, 2017	Calgary	Canada	Scotiabank Saddledome	Family emergency
November 15, 2017	Edmonton	Canada	Rogers Place	Family emergency
August 12, 2018 (Note: The cancelled concert on August 12, 2018 in Bali is part of Sunny Side Up Festival)	Bali	Indonesia	Potato Head Beach Club	2018 Lombok earthquake
