= Sorry (Halsey song) =

2017 song by Halsey

Song by Halsey

from the album Hopeless Fountain Kingdom
- Released: June 2, 2017
- Studio: Echo Studios (Los Angeles, California)
- Length: 3:40
- Label: Astralwerks
- Songwriters: Ashley Frangipane; Greg Kurstin
- Producer: Greg Kurstin

Music video
- "Sorry" on YouTube

"Sorry" is a song by American singer Halsey, from her second studio album, Hopeless Fountain Kingdom (2017). It was written by Halsey and its producer Greg Kurstin. The track is a ballad where she apologizes to her potential lovers for not letting them to get close to her. The music video for the song was directed by Sing J Lee and Halsey and it was released on February 2, 2018 on Halsey's Vevo channel. The song has achieved over 400 million streams on Spotify, being the third most played song from the album, despite not being an official single.

== Composition ==
"Sorry" (2017)
A 30-second sample of "Sorry", a piano ballad about apologizing for rejecting a potential lover.

"Sorry" was written by Halsey and Greg Kurstin, the latter also producing the song. The song is a simplistic piano arranged ballad which lasts for a duration of 3:40 (three minutes and forty seconds). Written in the key of A♭ major, "Sorry" has a tempo of 74 beats per minute. Halsey's vocal range span from F_{3} to Bb_{4}. The song's instrumentation comes from piano, guitar and mellotron. Rob Sheffield from Rolling Stone thought that its lyrical content "worries whether she'll ever like herself enough to let anyone get close to her". The song begins with a "somber" piano opening, followed by the lines "I've missed your calls for months it seems/ Don't realize how mean I can be/ Cause I can sometimes treat the people/ That I love like jewelry" sung by Halsey. During the chorus, she sings "So I'm sorry to my unknown lover/ Sorry that I can't believe/ That anybody ever really/ Starts to fall in love with me". Toward the ending, she sings "Someone will love you/ But someone isn't me".

== Music video ==
An accompanying music video for "Sorry" was directed by Sing J Lee and Halsey, who had also helmed the videos for the previous singles, "Now or Never" and "Bad at Love". It was uploaded on February 2, 2018, on Halsey's Vevo channel. The video begins with the singer with wounds on her face after a car crash from the ending of "Now or Never", she starts walking on a street on fire with dead bodies and abandoned vehicles everywhere. The video was filmed as a one-shot.

== Credits and personnel ==
Credits adapted from Tidal.

- Ashley Frangipane – songwriter, vocals
- Greg Kurstin − songwriter, producer, guitar, mellotron, piano, recording engineer
- John Hanes − mixing engineer
- Serban Ghenea − mixer
- Alex Pasco − recording engineer
- Julian Burg − recording engineer

== Certifications ==
Certifications for "Sorry"
Region	Certification	Certified units/sales
Brazil (Pro-Música Brasil)	Platinum	40,000^{‡}
New Zealand (RMNZ)	Gold	15,000^{‡}
Poland (ZPAV)	Gold	25,000^{‡}
Portugal (AFP)	Gold	5,000^{‡}
United Kingdom (BPI)	Silver	200,000^{‡}
United States (RIAA)	Platinum	1,000,000^{‡}
^{‡} Sales+streaming figures based on certification alone.
