= Alone (Halsey song) =

2018 song by Halsey

Single by Halsey featuring Big Sean and Stefflon Don

from the album Hopeless Fountain Kingdom
- Released: March 15, 2018
- Recorded: August 2016 – January 2017
- Genre: Alt-pop; dark pop; smooth soul
- Length: 3:27
- Label: Astralwerks
- Songwriters: Ashley Frangipane; Eric Frederic; Dan Wilson; Josh Carter; Anthony Hester; Sean Anderson; Stephanie Allen
- Producers: Ricky Reed; Josh Carter

Halsey singles chronology
"Him & I" (2017)	"Alone" (2018)	"Eastside" (2018)

Big Sean singles chronology
"So Good" (2018)	"Alone" (2018)	"Big Bank" (2018)

Stefflon Don singles chronology
"Bum Bum Tam Tam (Remix)" (2017)	"Alone" (2018)	"Push Back" (2018)

Music video
- "Alone" on YouTube

"Alone" is a song by American singer Halsey from her second studio album Hopeless Fountain Kingdom (2017). A remixed version of the song featuring American rapper Big Sean and British rapper Stefflon Don was released on March 15, 2018 through Astralwerks as the third and final single from the album.

== Background and composition ==
"Alone" contains a sample from "Nothing Can Stop Me", written by Tony Hester and recorded by Marilyn McCoo and Billy Davis Jr. "Alone" follows "kinda like this Gatsby vibe," as stated by Halsey. It's about a social butterfly at the house party (which is a parallel to the masquerade ball in Romeo and Juilet) referenced in "Heaven In Hiding" and "Strangers". It is the second character's perspective of this party, with "Heaven In Hiding" acting as the first character's perspective. Musically, "Alone" is an alternative pop, dark pop, and smooth soul song featuring verses that blend hip-hop, pop, and dancehall.

== Music video ==
The music video was directed by Halsey with Hannah Lux Davis and released on April 6, 2018. It starts with Halsey walking to a building where there is a Masquerade Ball. She starts dancing, before noticing her former lover on the balcony getting cozy with another woman, while various flashbacks from the "Now or Never" music video are shown. She gets caught up in the crazy and energetic filled party, and runs to a fountain to vomit a black feather and liquid. Suddenly, Big Sean's character appears to rap his verse/console her. She walks into a fully mirrored room, and Stefflon Don is shown rapping her verse, wearing a red dress. The video ends with Halsey celebrating her happiness as confetti falls down, with her former lover staring at her confused by a note she left for him.

== Live performances ==
Halsey performed "Alone" live on Sounds Like Friday Night on April 6, 2018. This was also her first UK television performance. In May, she performed the song on The Voice.

== Track listings ==
- Digital download
1. "Alone" (featuring Big Sean and Stefflon Don) – 3:27
- Digital download – Calvin Harris Remix
1. "Alone" (featuring Stefflon Don) – 3:19
- Digital download – Alone (featuring Big Sean and Stefflon Don) [Remixes]
1. "Alone" (featuring Big Sean and Stefflon Don) [Clean Bandit MFF Remix] – 3:23
2. "Alone" (featuring Big Sean and Stefflon Don) [CID Remix] – 3:46

== Charts ==
=== Weekly charts ===
Chart (2018)	Peak position
Czech Republic Airplay (ČNS IFPI)	34
New Zealand Heatseekers (RMNZ)	8
US Billboard Hot 100	66
US Adult Pop Airplay (Billboard)	16
US Dance Club Songs (Billboard)	1
US Dance/Mix Show Airplay (Billboard)	15
US Pop Airplay (Billboard)	17

Calvin Harris remix

Chart (2018)	Peak position
Ukraine Airplay (Tophit)	25

=== Year-end charts ===
Chart (2018)	position
US Dance Club Songs (Billboard)	20

== Certifications ==
Region	Certification	Certified units/sales
Brazil (Pro-Música Brasil)	Gold	20,000^{‡}
Canada (Music Canada)	Platinum	80,000^{‡}
New Zealand (RMNZ)	Platinum	30,000^{‡}
United States (RIAA)	2× Platinum	2,000,000^{‡}
^{‡} Sales+streaming figures based on certification alone.

== Release history ==
Region	Date	Format	Version	Label	Ref.
Various	March 15, 2018	Digital download	Original	Capitol; Astralwerks	
Australia	March 16, 2018	Contemporary hit radio	Original	Universal Music Australia	
Various	April 20, 2018	Digital download	Calvin Harris Remix	Capitol Records; Astralwerks	
Italy	May 4, 2018	Contemporary hit radio	Original	Universal	
