= Not Afraid Anymore =

Single by Halsey

from the album Fifty Shades Darker: Original Motion Picture Soundtrack
- Released: January 13, 2017
- Length: 3:46
- Label: Republic
- Songwriters: Ashley Frangipane; Jason Quenneville; Nasri Atweh; Adam Messinger
- Producer: The Messengers

Halsey singles chronology
"Closer" (2016)	"Not Afraid Anymore" (2017)	"Now or Never" (2017)

Audio video
- "Not Afraid Anymore" on YouTube

"Not Afraid Anymore" is a song recorded by American singer and songwriter Halsey for the soundtrack of the 2017 film Fifty Shades Darker. It was written by Halsey, Jason Quenneville, Nasri Atweh, Adam Messinger and produced by Atweh and Messinger under The Messengers. The song was released on January 13, 2017, by Universal Music Group as the second single from the album.

== Charts ==
Chart (2017)	Peak position
Australia (ARIA)	55
Canada Hot 100 (Billboard)	72
Czech Republic Singles Digital (ČNS IFPI)	85
France (SNEP)	71
New Zealand Heatseekers (RMNZ)	1
Scottish Singles Sales (Official Charts)	59
Slovakia Singles Digital (ČNS IFPI)	85
US Billboard Hot 100	77

== Certifications ==
Region	Certification	Certified units/sales
Brazil (Pro-Música Brasil)	Gold	30,000^{‡}
United States (RIAA)	Gold	500,000^{‡}
^{‡} Sales+streaming figures based on certification alone.

== Release history ==
Region	Date	Format	Label	Ref.
Various	January 13, 2017	Digital download	Republic; Universal	
