= So Good (Halsey song) =

2022 single by Halsey

Single by Halsey
- Released: June 9, 2022
- Genre: Pop
- Length: 2:56
- Label: Capitol
- Songwriters: Ashley Frangipane; Sarah Aarons; Sammy Witte
- Producer: Tobias Karlsson

Halsey singles chronology
"You Asked for This" (2021)	"So Good" (2022)	"Stay with Me" (2022)

Music video
- "So Good" on YouTube

"So Good" is a song by American singer-songwriter Halsey. It was released as a single through Capitol Records on June 9, 2022. The song was written by Halsey, Sarah Aarons and Sammy Witte. It was produced by Tobias Karlsson with additional production by Witte and Max Martin. Two days after the song was released, Halsey performed it live for the first time at the 2022 Governors Ball Music Festival.

A stripped version was released on July 1, 2022.

== Composition and lyrics ==
"So Good" is a pop ballad about Halsey's long-term relationship with Turkish-American screenwriter Alev Aydin, who directed the song's music video and appears in it with Halsey.

== Release controversy ==
On May 22 and 23, 2022, Halsey took to Twitter and TikTok, claiming her record label, Capitol Records, was holding up the release of "So Good", which, along with its music video, had been completed for over a month. She further felt that they were holding up releases of other artists as well due to being careful because of marketing. Revealed to be titled "So Good", Halsey revealed that her label was refusing to release the song as they wanted to "test its virality on TikTok" first. The controversy surrounding its release led to much criticism of Capitol; eventually, on May 31, 2022, Capitol announced they would release the song on June 9, 2022, stating on Twitter; "We are an artist-first company that encourages open dialogue". Halsey left the label in 2023 due to the controversy.

== Music video ==
The song's official music video, directed by Alev Aydin, premiered on June 10, 2022. Halsey and Aydin appear with Charlie Oldman, Sora Connor and Tatiana de Campos Ringsbys, in scenes showing the process of shooting a video.

== Personnel ==
- Halsey – vocals
- Max Martin – additional production
- Tobias Karlsson – production, guitar, bass, keyboards, engineering, programming
- Samuel Witte - additional production
- Serban Ghenea – mixing
- Bryce Bordone – mixing assistance
- Chris Gehringer – mastering
- Brandon Buttner – recording

== Charts ==
=== Weekly charts ===
Weekly chart performance for "So Good"
Chart (2022)	Peak position
Australia (ARIA)	79
Canada Hot 100 (Billboard)	46
Canada CHR/Top 40 (Billboard)	16
Canada Hot AC (Billboard)	21
Czech Republic Airplay (ČNS IFPI)	11
Global 200 (Billboard)	62
Hungary (Single Top 40)	17
Japan Hot Overseas (Billboard Japan)	16
New Zealand Hot Singles (RMNZ)	8
Sweden Heatseeker (Sverigetopplistan)	4
UK Singles (Official Charts)	67
US Billboard Hot 100	51
US Adult Contemporary (Billboard)	19
US Adult Pop Airplay (Billboard)	9
US Pop Airplay (Billboard)	10

=== Year-end charts ===
2022 year-end chart performance for "So Good"
Chart (2022)	Position
US Adult Top 40 (Billboard)	27
US Mainstream Top 40 (Billboard)	39

== Certifications ==
Certifications for "So Good"
Region	Certification	Certified units/sales
Brazil (Pro-Música Brasil)	Gold	20,000^{‡}
Canada (Music Canada)	Gold	40,000^{‡}
United States (RIAA)	Platinum	1,000,000^{‡}
^{‡} Sales+streaming figures based on certification alone.
