= Hopeless Fountain Kingdom =

2017 studio album by Halsey

Studio album by Halsey
- Released: June 2, 2017
- Studios: The Beehive (Van Nuys, California); Conway; Elysian Park; Westlake; 555; Echo (Los Angeles, California); Sole (London, United Kingdom)
- Genres: Pop; R&B; electropop; synth-pop
- Length: 38:32
- Label: Astralwerks
- Producers: Halsey; Lido; Ricky Reed; Benny Blanco; Cashmere Cat; Happy Perez; Josh Carter; Greg Kurstin; Rogét Chahayed

Halsey chronology
Badlands (2015)	Hopeless Fountain Kingdom (2017)	Manic (2020)

Singles from Hopeless Fountain Kingdom
- 1. "Now or Never" Released: April 4, 2017; 2. "Bad at Love" Released: August 22, 2017; 3. "Alone" Released: March 15, 2018

Hopeless Fountain Kingdom (stylized in all lowercase) is the second studio album by American singer-songwriter Halsey. It was released on June 2, 2017, through Astralwerks. Conceived as a concept album, it serves as a companion to her debut studio album, Badlands (2015), and follows a narrative inspired by William Shakespeare's Romeo and Juliet. Halsey served as an executive producer and collaborated with producers including Greg Kurstin, Benny Blanco, Ricky Reed, and Cashmere Cat.

Hopeless Fountain Kingdom is a pop, R&B, electropop, and synth-pop record, with elements of hip hop, soul, EDM, and alternative music. Its lyrics explore themes of love, heartbreak, desire, and identity through the story of two lovers from opposing worlds. The album features guest appearances from Quavo and Lauren Jauregui, while Sia and the Weeknd contributed as songwriters. It was supported by three singles—"Now or Never", "Bad at Love" and "Alone", as well as two promotional singles—"Eyes Closed" and "Strangers"; "Now or Never" charted within top 20 on the US Billboard Hot 100, while "Bad at Love" peaked at number 5 on the chart. Halsey further promoted the record with the Hopeless Fountain Kingdom Tour, which visited North America, Europe, Asia, Latin America, and Australia between 2017 and 2018.

Hopeless Fountain Kingdom received generally favorable reviews from music critics, who often praised its ambition and conceptual scope, as well as Halsey's artistic development, although some criticized its stylistic influences and execution. The album charted at number one in the United States and Canada while reaching the top ten in Australia, Ireland, and New Zealand and peaking within the top 20 in multiple European countries. Hopeless Fountain Kingdom was certified double platinum in the United States and New Zealand, as well as platinum in Australia and Canada.

== Background and inspiration ==
Halsey said that she had not intended her debut studio album to target mainstream radio. While she described Hopeless Fountain Kingdom as having a more radio-friendly sound, she still considered herself an alternative artist, adding that she was "more than capable of writing radio music". For this album, Halsey worked with various producers like Greg Kurstin, Benny Blanco, and Ricky Reed. She was an executive producer and oversaw the album's concept, songwriting, visual direction, and accompanying fan experiences. Recording for Hopeless Fountain Kingdom primarily took place at studios in Los Angeles, with additional sessions held in Van Nuys and London.

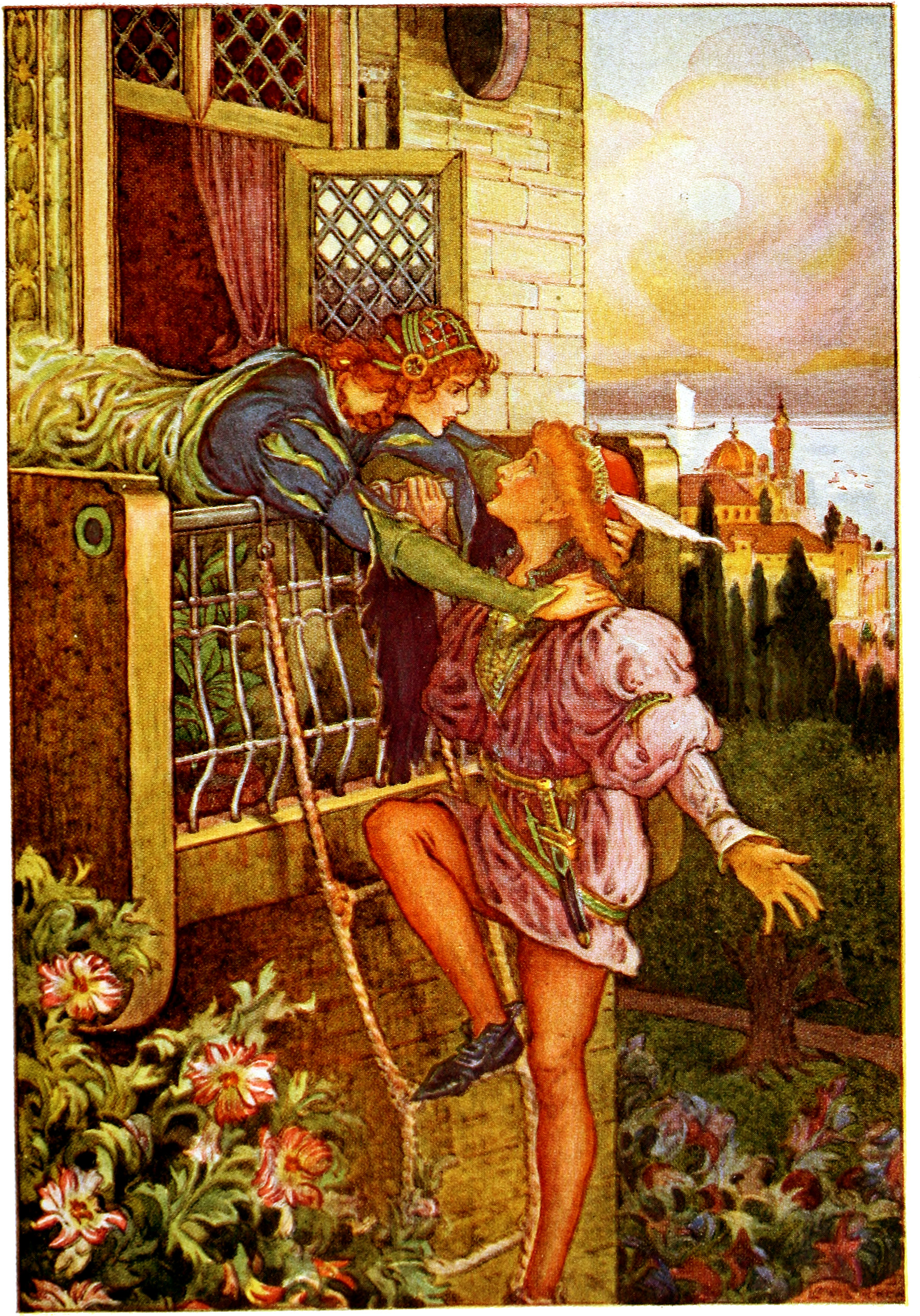
Halsey cited Romeo and Juliet (pictured) as an inspiration for Hopeless Fountain Kingdom.

Halsey drew inspiration for Hopeless Fountain Kingdom from her experience in a toxic relationship. A concept album, it connects with her previous studio album, Badlands (2015); whereas Badlands used an apocalyptic setting as a metaphor for depression, Hopeless Fountain Kingdom follows two lovers from different worlds whose desire to be together leads them to sacrifice parts of themselves, drawing inspiration from William Shakespeare's play Romeo and Juliet. The opening track "The Prologue" features the play's prologue spoken by Halsey, while the music video for "Alone" was heavily influenced by Baz Luhrmann's 1996 film adaptation of the play, Romeo + Juliet.

Halsey explained various parallels between lyrics in songs from both albums; each track contains connections to the album's wider narrative and to songs from Badlands through recurring lyrical references and themes. Speaking with Paper, Halsey revealed that Hopeless Fountain Kingdom is set in a purgatory-like world where two lovers from different backgrounds attempt to "beat the odds" and make their relationship work, unlike Badlands. Billboard author Colin Stutz pointed out that the album might be named after a real fountain built by Halsey's ex-boyfriend near the L train's Halsey Street station in Brooklyn.

== Composition ==
Halsey said that Hopeless Fountain Kingdom would incorporate more urban and R&B influences, while also featuring some stripped-down and vulnerable songs. Featuring collaborations with various artists including the Weeknd, Sia, Quavo, and Lauren Jauregui, the album is mainly rooted in pop, R&B, electropop, and synth-pop, with elements of trap-pop, alternative, hip-hop, soul, and EDM. Jon Caramanica of The New York Times noted that Halsey's adaptable vocal style allows her to move between different musical approaches, incorporating influences from other singers.

Thematically, Hopeless Fountain Kingdom is noted for swapping the genders of Romeo and Juliet and including same-sex relationships. The main character is a bisexual female named Luna Aureum, and her main love interest is a male character Solis Angelus. There are references to female love interests in the songs "Bad at Love" and "Strangers"; the latter features Jauregui, who is also bisexual.

=== Music ===
"Now or Never"
An R&B and dark pop song "Now or Never" marks a stylistic departure from the industrial-influenced alternative pop of Badlands (2015).

"100 Letters" incorporates hand drum-driven instrumentation and a restrained chorus as well as atmospheric percussion loops and distant guitar textures. Featuring goth-leaning production, "Eyes Closed" combines layered backing vocals with melancholic melodies. Multiple critics compared it to the style of co-writer the Weeknd; Variety's Jem Aswad felt that the song adopted the Weeknd's signature "wistful" and "hazy" sound, arguing that the departure from Halsey's earlier style worked to her advantage. On "Alone", Deborah Krieger of PopMatters and Caramanica observed a lyrical and musical resemblance to Alessia Cara's "Here" and Ed Sheeran's "Dive", respectively. The alt-pop and soul song combines brass and cello instrumentation with the sounds of 1990s music. "Now or Never" is an R&B, dark pop, and mid-tempo song that adopts a more summer-influenced sound than much of Halsey's earlier works.

"Sorry" is a classical piano ballad; Krieger highlighted the song for its stripped-back arrangement, which pairs Halsey's vocals with a somber piano accompaniment and largely avoids the vocal effects and electronic production found elsewhere on the album. "Good Mourning" is a one-minute interlude featuring spoken-word vocals by a child. An urban hip-hop and R&B song, "Lie" features guest vocals from Quavo, which adds a collaborative element to the album's midsection. According to Halsey, the mid-tempo pop ballad "Bad at Love" was intended to evoke the sounds of "Leonardo DiCaprio in a Hawaiian T-shirt in a droptop yellow convertible". "Walls Could Talk" is built around a violin riff and a stuttering chorus, drawing comparisons to late 1990s pop and R&B. Halsey co-wrote "Devil in Me" with Sia, which appears as part of the album's closing trio; it is paired with "Angel on Fire" and was noted for maintaining its emotional intensity without becoming excessive. The final track "Hopeless" is an electro song that features Cashmere Cat and incorporates elements of alternative music.

=== Lyrics ===
The opening track "The Prologue" quotes Romeo and Juliet, which reinforces its conceptual framework. "100 Letters" depicts a deteriorating relationship through imagery of discarded love notes and emotional manipulation. The Observer journalist Kitty Empire observed that it balances expressions of "righteousness" and "self-excoriation". "Alone" portrays a narrator navigating parties, drinking, and social interactions while grappling with anxiety. Inspired by Halsey's breakup with co-writer Lido, "Lie" was described by Halsey as the most difficult song on the album to write. It depicts "both sides of a strange relationship gone off the rails" as she sings the lines "Are you misled? / I gave you the messiest head", according to Rolling Stone's Rob Sheffield.

"Bad at Love" reflects on a series of Halsey's past relationships with both men and women, while acknowledging repeated mistakes in love. "Don't Play" concentrates on nightlife, partying, and substance use. "Strangers" depicts a same-sex relationship between two women, reflecting Halsey's intention to write a female–female love song. Alongside "Bad at Love", it is identified as one of the tracks in which Halsey explicitly references loving women. Krieger considered the lyrics of "Angel on Fire" as "the most teenager-y line", with Halsey singing "nobody seems to ask about me anymore / And nobody seems to care 'bout anything I think".

== Promotion ==
=== Marketing and distribution ===
Halsey referenced Hopeless Fountain Kingdom as early as 2014, posting "the Kingdom" via her Twitter. It prompted speculation among fans about its connection to the fictional settings established in her earlier works. When playing at Madison Square Garden in 2016, Halsey displayed the words "you can find me in the Kingdom" on a screen. In February 2017, she invited 100 fans in London to a church to hear four new songs from the album. In March, four Twitter accounts connected to Halsey began hinting at a storyline present in the album, involving two characters named Luna and Solis belonging to two different houses called the House of Aureum and the House of Angelus. Soon after the tweets were released, Halsey began mailing out quotes from Romeo and Juliet to her fans.

Hopeless Fountain Kingdom was announced on March 7, 2017, along with a photograph of her holding a rose. On March 23, she announced the release date of June 2. To reveal the album's cover art, she had a global scavenger hunt, where miniature gun-shaped USB flash drives were hidden in nine cities around the world with pieces of the cover. To promote Hopeless Fountain Kingdom's narrative, Halsey and her team developed an extensive interactive campaign that included mailed clues, scavenger hunts, and character profiles designed to expand the storyline beyond the music itself. On May 4, "Eyes Closed" premiered at Apple Music's Beats 1 during an interview with Zane Lowe and Luhrman. On the same day, Halsey performed "Now or Never" at The Tonight Show Starring Jimmy Fallon, later at the Billboard Music Awards on May 21.

Via Astralwerks, various editions of Hopeless Fountain Kingdom were released simultaneously on June 2, 2017. The 13-track standard edition was released on compact disc (CD), vinyl, digital download, and streaming services. The deluxe edition contains a remixed version of "Alone" which features the rappers Big Sean and Stefflon Don, while Target and Deluxe Plus editions include three additional tracks—"Heaven in Hiding", "Don't Play", and "Angel on Fire".

=== Singles ===
Three singles supported Hopeless Fountain Kingdom. The lead single, "Now or Never", was released on April 4, 2017, with the accompanying six remixes. Co-directed with Sing J Lee and shot in Mexico City, its music video premiered on the same day. According to Halsey, the video—her directorial debut—forms part of a broader narrative telling the story of "two people in love despite the forces trying to keep them apart". "Now or Never" debuted at number 50 and peaked at number 17 on the US Billboard Hot 100, becoming her first single as a lead artist to reach the top 40 and her first since a collaboration with the Chainsmokers, "Closer" (2016).

Two promotional singles, "Eyes Closed" and "Strangers" that features Jauregui, were released on May 4 and May 26, respectively. The former was supported by the accompanying music video. "Strangers" peaked at number 100 on the Hot 100, being Halsey's sixth entry and Jauregui's first as a solo artist. The second single, "Bad at Love", followed on August 22. It was recorded in Los Angeles alongside Reed and accompanied by its music video—also co-directed with Lee—picking up where the "Now or Never" video left off. The song was accompanied by five remixes. "Bad at Love" peaked at number five on the Hot 100 and entered various Billboard charts such as Streaming Songs, Pop Songs, and Radio Songs, reaching number one on the Dance Club Songs and Dance/Mix Show Airplay charts.

After a music video for the track "Sorry" was released on February 2, 2018, a remixed version of "Alone" featuring Sean and Don served as the album's third single on March 15. Hannah Lux Davis co-directed the music video, and it was unveiled on April 6. "Alone" peaked at number 66 on the Hot 100.

=== Tour ===
On May 3, 2017, Halsey announced the Hopeless Fountain Kingdom Tour in support of the album. PartyNextDoor and Charli XCX joined the tour as opening acts, and ticket pre-sales became available on May 8. Starting from Uncasville, Connecticut, on September 29, the tour concluded at Cleveland, Ohio, on November 22. In November, Halsey cancelled the remaining Canadian dates of the tour after stopping a concert in Alberta mid-performance. The following scheduled show in Edmonton was also cancelled, with promoters citing a "personal emergency".

On March 26, 2018, Halsey announced an exclusive UK tour, set to take place at Eventim Apollo in London. Additional opening acts were Kehlani, Lauren Jauregui, and Niki, who performed in Australia, Latin America, and Asia, respectively. Jessie Reyez performed on the North American dates as a special guest. Alma and Raye served as opening acts for the final dates in London.

== Critical reception ==
Professional ratings
Aggregate scores
Source	Rating
AnyDecentMusic?	6.7/10
Metacritic	66/100
Review scores
Source	Rating
AllMusic	3.5/5 stars
Consequence	B
The Line of Best Fit	6/10
The Music	4/5 stars
NME	4/5 stars
The Observer	3/5 stars
Pitchfork	6.5/10
PopMatters	4/10
Rolling Stone	4/5 stars
Spectrum Culture	3.5/5 stars

On release, Hopeless Fountain Kingdom received generally positive reviews from music critics. At Metacritic, which assigns a normalized rating out of 100 to reviews from mainstream critics, the album has an average score of 66 out of 100, based on ten reviews.

Critics frequently commented on the album's ambition and conceptual scope. Rob Sheffield of Rolling Stone wrote that Halsey "shows off all her wild musical ambitions" on her "bold" second album, describing it as a "sprawling science-fiction breakup tale" that indulges her penchant for "wide-screen melodrama". Jem Aswad of Variety wrote that Hopeless Fountain Kingdom largely succeeds, noting that it represents a "big step forward" both musically and conceptually from the more "monochromatic" sound of Halsey's debut, even though she is surrounded by "heavy company". Madelyn Tait of The Music wrote that Hopeless Fountain Kingdom shows Halsey's ability to create music that achieves radio appeal while retaining "creativity and originality", and praised it as a "complete body of work" that rewards listening from start to finish. Writing for NME, Rhian Daly likewise considered the album "ambitious" yet "cohesive", arguing that its numerous collaborators and guest appearances never distracted from Halsey's artistic vision.

Reviewers also highlighted Hopeless Fountain Kingdom's expanded musical palette and Halsey's artistic development. Stephen Thomas Erlewine of AllMusic wrote that it broadened the EDM-pop foundation of Badlands with influences from singer-songwriter music, hip hop, and soul, arguing that its expanded stylistic range helped make its songs more distinctive, and Sheffield similarly characterized its sound as "adult dystopian synth-pop realness". In The Line of Best Fit, Grant Rindner felt that Halsey displayed greater versatility than on her previous releases, finding that the album suggested artistic growth even if it did not yet establish a definitive new sound for her career. Reviewing for Consequence, Dan Weiss noted the contributions of numerous collaborators but nevertheless viewed Halsey as an "album artist first", arguing that the record stands out most when Halsey draws on her experiences and insights regarding relationships with both men and women.

Other critics questioned the album's originality and stylistic identity. Writing for The Observer, Kitty Empire argued that the album "succumbs to post-hit syndrome", citing Halsey's appearance on "Closer" as an early "omen". Although she considered the record "not remotely bad" and representative of the kind of "hotly awaited pop" album expected in 2017, she felt that the influence of the music industry was evident throughout. Jon Caramanica of The New York Times commended Halsey's lyrical perspective and delivery, noting that her narratives possess "rough edges and ellipsis endings". However, he felt that the album lacked a comparable "musical edge", arguing that it instead reflected "a belief in the crowdsourcing of ideas".

In a mixed review, USA Today's Maeve McDermott felt that the album drew heavily from the "magpie-like" sounds of other artists, though she considered some of those influences "better" than others. Spin editor Jordan Sargent similarly described the record as a "deeply imperfect and too-often derivative" effort, while Deborah Kreiger of PopMatters criticized both its lyrical specificity and concept, arguing that its Romeo and Juliet-inspired narrative added little to the listening experience. Conversely, Spectrum Culture's Daniel Bromfield described it as "one of the most songwriting-focused pop records of the year". Although he considered the record "full of the trappings of an auteur project", he felt that Halsey's direct and personal writing prevented it from becoming overwrought. More critical of the album's execution, Katherine St. Asaph of Pitchfork argued that although its concept was ambitious, the album often relied on familiar pop conventions. While she praised songs such as "100 Letters", "Walls Could Talk" and "Alone", she felt that various stylistic experiments were less successful and concluded that the album's musical style did not always match its thematic ambitions.

== Commercial performance ==
Hopeless Fountain Kingdom debuted at number one on the US Billboard 200 with 106,000 album-equivalent units, of which 76,000 were pure album sales. It made Halsey the first female act in 2017 to open atop the chart. In Canada, the album peaked at number one, while in Australia, it debuted at number two with first-week sales of 4,300 copies. The album debuted at number 12 on the UK Albums Chart, selling 7,123 copies in its first week.

Across Europe and Oceania, it reached the top ten in Ireland and New Zealand, peaking at number seven and six, respectively. Elsewhere, it charted within the top 20 in Belgium's Flanders region, the Netherlands, Italy, Portugal, Spain, Norway, Finland, Austria, and the Czech Republic, while also reaching the top 30 in Germany, Denmark, Greece, Poland, Sweden, and Switzerland. The album attained lower peak positions in Belgium's Wallonia region, France, Latvia, and Slovakia.

On the 2017 year-end charts, Hopeless Fountain Kingdom reached numbers 81, 194, and 61 in Australia, Flanders, and the United States, respectively. It further peaked at numbers 51 and 165 on the 2018 and 2019 year-end charts in the United States, respectively. Hopeless Fountain Kingdom has received certifications in multiple markets, including double platinum in Brazil, New Zealand, and the United States, platinum in Australia, Canada, and Norway, and gold certifications in Denmark, Mexico, Poland, Singapore, Sweden, and the United Kingdom.

== Track listing ==
Standard edition
No.	Title	Writer(s)	Producer(s)	Length
1.	"The Prologue"	Ashley Frangipane; Peder Losnegård; Chris Braide	Lido	1:47
2.	"100 Letters"	Frangipane; Eric Frederic	Ricky Reed	3:29
3.	"Eyes Closed"	Frangipane; Benjamin Levin; Magnus August Høiberg; Nathan Perez; Abel Tesfaye	Benny Blanco; Happy Perez; Magnus August Høiberg	3:22
4.	"Alone"	Frangipane; Frederic; Dan Wilson; Josh Carter; Anthony Hester	Reed; Carter^{[a]}	3:25
5.	"Now or Never"	Frangipane; Levin; Høiberg; Perez; Brittany Hazzard	Blanco; Høiberg; Perez	3:34
6.	"Sorry"	Frangipane; Greg Kurstin	Kurstin	3:40
7.	"Good Mourning"	Frangipane; Losnegård	Lido	1:07
8.	"Lie" (featuring Quavo)	Frangipane; Losnegård; Quavious Marshall	Lido	2:29
9.	"Walls Could Talk"	Frangipane; Losnegård	Lido	1:41
10.	"Bad at Love"	Frangipane; Frederic; Justin Tranter; Rogét Chahayed	Reed; Chahayed^{[b]}	3:01
11.	"Strangers" (featuring Lauren Jauregui)	Frangipane; Kurstin	Kurstin	3:41
12.	"Devil in Me"	Frangipane; Kurstin; Sia Furler	Kurstin	4:09
13.	"Hopeless" (featuring Cashmere Cat)	Frangipane; Levin; Høiberg; Joshua Coleman	Blanco; Høiberg	3:07
Total length:				38:32

Deluxe edition
No.	Title	Writer(s)	Producer(s)	Length
14.	"Alone" (featuring Big Sean and Stefflon Don)	Frangipane; Frederic; Wilson; Carter; Hester; Sean Anderson; Stephanie Allen	Reed; Carter^{[a]}	3:27
Total length:				41:49

Target and Deluxe Plus edition
No.	Title	Writer(s)	Producer(s)	Length
4.	"Heaven in Hiding"	Frangipane; Kurstin	Kurstin	3:27
5.	"Alone"	Frangipane; Frederic; Wilson; Carter; Hester	Reed; Carter^{[a]}	3:25
6.	"Now or Never"	Frangipane; Levin; Høiberg; Hazzard; Perez	Blanco; Høiberg; Perez	3:34
7.	"Sorry"	Frangipane; Kurstin	Kurstin	3:40
8.	"Good Mourning"	Frangipane; Losnegård	Lido	1:07
9.	"Lie" (featuring Quavo)	Frangipane; Losnegård; Marshall	Lido	2:29
10.	"Walls Could Talk"	Frangipane; Losnegård	Lido	1:41
11.	"Bad at Love"	Frangipane; Frederic; Tranter; Chahayed	Reed; Chahayed^{[b]}	3:01
12.	"Don't Play"	Frangipane; Losnegård	Lido	3:30
13.	"Strangers" (featuring Lauren Jauregui)	Frangipane; Kurstin	Kurstin	3:41
14.	"Angel on Fire"	Frangipane; Kurstin	Kurstin	3:14
15.	"Devil in Me"	Frangipane; Kurstin; Furler	Kurstin	4:09
16.	"Hopeless" (featuring Cashmere Cat)	Frangipane; Levin; Høiberg; Coleman	Blanco; Høiberg	3:07
Total length:				48:43

=== Notes ===
- ^{^[a]} signifies a co-producer.
- ^{^[b]} signifies an additional producer.
- "Alone" contains a sample from "Nothing Can Stop Me from Loving You", written by Tony Hester and recorded by Marilyn McCoo and Billy Davis Jr.

== Credits and personnel ==
Credits were adapted from the Deluxe Plus edition's liner notes.

=== Recording locations ===
- The Beehive; Van Nuys, California (1, 8, 9)
- Conway Recording Studios; Los Angeles, California (1, 8, 9)
- Elysian Park; Los Angeles, California (2, 4)
- Westlake Recording Studios; Los Angeles, California (3, 5)
- Sole Studio; London, United Kingdom (3, 5)
- 555 Studio; Los Angeles, California (5)
- Echo Studios; Los Angeles, California (6)

=== Performers and musicians ===
- Halsey – vocals
- Quavo – vocals (9)
- Lauren Jauregui – vocals (13)
- Big Sean – vocals (iTunes bonus track)
- Stefflon Don – vocals (iTunes bonus track)
- Cashmere Cat – featured artist (16), instruments (3, 5, 16), keyboards (3, 5, 16)
- Kiara Ana – viola (1, 8–10)
- Benny Blanco – instruments (3, 6, 16), keyboards (3, 6, 16)
- Rogét Chahayed – instruments (11)
- Dante Frangipane – spoken word (8)
- Ezra Kurstin – voices (13)
- Greg Kurstin – drums (4, 13–15), guitar (4, 7, 13–14), keyboards (4, 13–15), mellotron (7), piano (7, 15), chamberlin (7), rhodes (15)
- Lido – instruments (1, 8–10, 12), keyboards (1, 8–10, 12)
- Alexandra McKoy – spoken word (8)
- Happy Perez – instruments (3, 6), guitar (3, 6)
- Ricky Reed – instruments (2, 5, 11)
- Starrah – background vocals (6)
- Chrysanthe Tan – violin (1, 8–10)
- Adrienne Woods – cello (1, 8–10)

=== Production ===
- Benny Blanco – production (3, 6, 16), programming (3, 6, 16)
- Julian Burg – recording (4, 7, 13–15)
- Josh Carter – co-production (5), programming (5)
- Cashmere Cat – production (3, 5, 16), programming (3, 5, 16)
- Rogét Chahayed – additional production (11)
- Chris Gehringer – mastering
- Serban Ghenea – mixing
- Mac Attkinson – recording engineer (3, 4, 6, 10)
- Amadxus – assistant recording engineer (3, 15)
- ATM the engineer – assistant recording engineer (10)
- John Hanes – engineered for mix
- Seif Hussain – production coordination (3, 6, 16)
- Greg Kurstin – production (4, 7, 13–15), recording (4, 7, 13–15), drum programming (4, 13–15)
- Lido – production (1, 8–10, 12), recording (1, 8–10, 12), programming (1, 8–10, 12)
- Andrew Luftman – production coordination (3, 6, 16)
- Alex Pasco – recording (4, 7, 13–15)
- Happy Perez – production (3, 6), programming (3, 6)
- Ricky Reed – production (2, 5, 11), programming (2, 5, 11)
- Dave Schwerkolt – recording (3, 6, 16)
- Ben Sedano – recording (1, 8–10, 12)
- Sarah Shelton – production coordination (3, 6, 16)
- Ethan Shumaker – recording (2, 5, 11)

=== Design ===
- Garrett Hilliker – art direction
- Brian Ziff – photography

== Charts ==
=== Weekly charts ===
Weekly chart performance
Chart (2017)	Peak position
Australian Albums (ARIA)	2
Austrian Albums (Ö3 Austria)	20
Belgian Albums (Ultratop Flanders)	14
Belgian Albums (Ultratop Wallonia)	64
Canadian Albums (Billboard)	1
Czech Albums (ČNS IFPI)	20
Danish Albums (Hitlisten)	24
Dutch Albums (Album Top 100)	15
Finnish Albums (Suomen virallinen lista)	17
French Albums (SNEP)	83
German Albums (Offizielle Top 100)	27
Greek Albums (IFPI)	26
Irish Albums (IRMA)	7
Italian Albums (FIMI)	15
Latvian Albums (LaIPA)	30
New Zealand Albums (RMNZ)	6
Norwegian Albums (VG-lista)	11
Polish Albums (ZPAV)	22
Portuguese Albums (AFP)	16
Scottish Albums (Official Charts)	13
Slovak Albums (ČNS IFPI)	32
Spanish Albums (Promusicae)	13
Swedish Albums (Sverigetopplistan)	27
Swiss Albums (Schweizer Hitparade)	24
UK Albums (Official Charts)	12
US Billboard 200	1

=== Year-end charts ===
Year-end chart performance
Chart (2017)	Position
Australian Albums (ARIA)	81
Belgian Albums (Ultratop Flanders)	194
US Billboard 200	61
Chart (2018)	Position
US Billboard 200	51
Chart (2019)	Position
US Billboard 200	165

== Certifications ==
Certifications and sales
Region	Certification	Certified units/sales
Australia (ARIA)	Platinum	70,000^{‡}
Brazil (Pro-Música Brasil) deluxe	2× Platinum	80,000^{‡}
Canada (Music Canada)	Platinum	80,000^{‡}
Denmark (IFPI Danmark)	Gold	10,000^{‡}
Mexico (AMPROFON)	Gold	30,000^{‡}
New Zealand (RMNZ)	2× Platinum	30,000^{‡}
Norway (IFPI Norway)	Platinum	20,000^{‡}
Poland (ZPAV)	Gold	10,000^{‡}
Singapore (RIAS)	Gold	5,000^{*}
Sweden (GLF)	Gold	15,000^{‡}
United Kingdom (BPI)	Gold	100,000^{‡}
United States (RIAA)	2× Platinum	2,000,000^{‡}
^{*} Sales figures based on certification alone.^{‡} Sales+streaming figures based on certification alone.

== Release history ==
List of release dates and formats
Region	Date	Format(s)	Edition	Label	Ref.
Various	June 2, 2017	CD; digital download; streaming; vinyl	Standard	Astralwerks	
Various	June 2, 2017	Digital download; streaming	Deluxe	Astralwerks	
Various	June 2, 2017	CD; digital download; streaming	Target; Deluxe Plus	Astralwerks	
