= Halsey (singer) =

American singer-songwriter (born 1994)

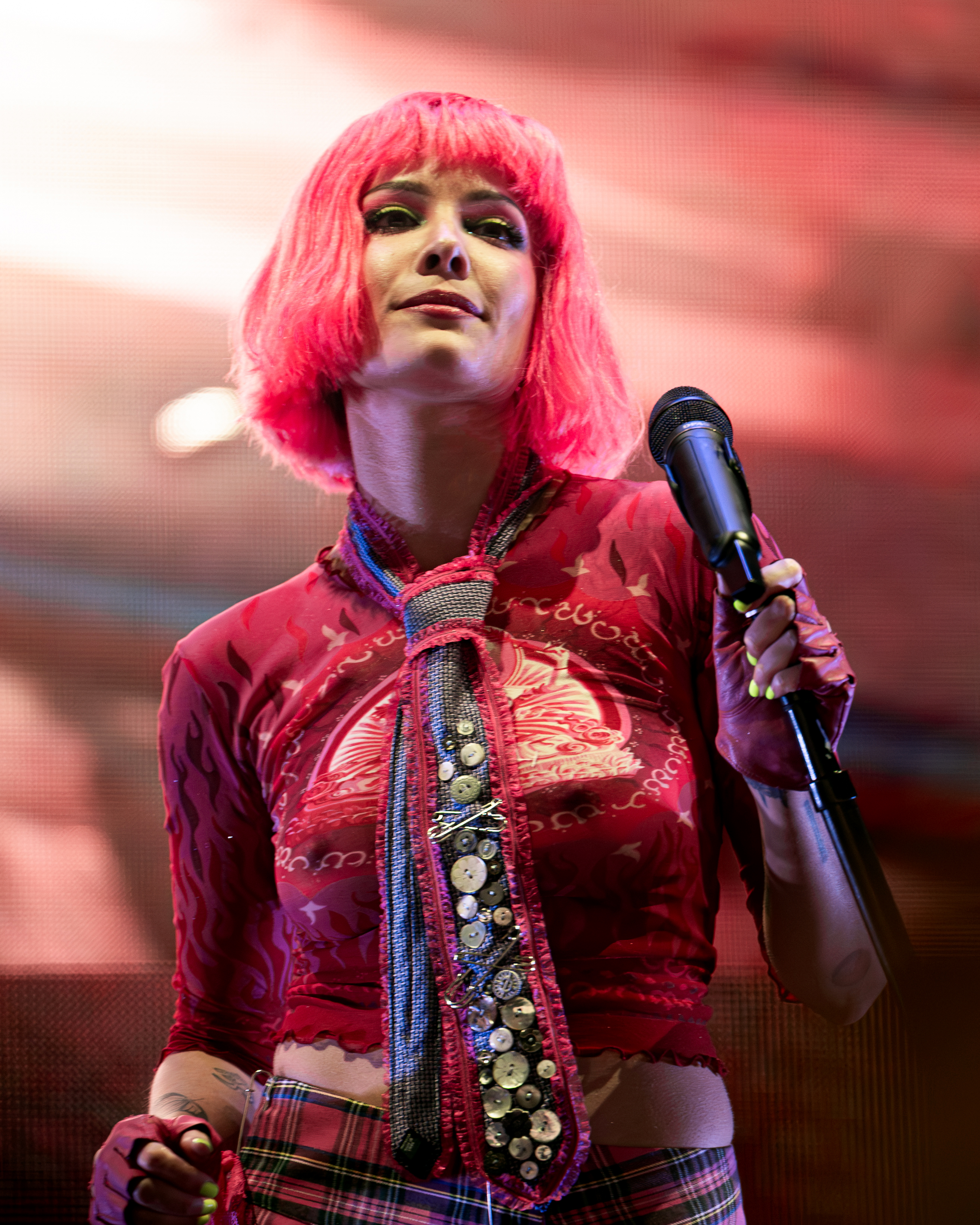
- Halsey in 2025
- Born: Ashley Nicolette Frangipane; September 29, 1994 (age 32); Edison, New Jersey, US
- Occupations: Singer; songwriter; actress
- Years active: 2012–present
- Works: Discography
- Partner(s): Avan Jogia (2023–present; engaged)
- Children: 1
- Awards: Full list
- Musical career
- Genres: Pop; electronic; alternative rock; R&B
- Instruments: Vocals; guitar
- Labels: Astralwerks; Capitol; Columbia
- Website: iamhalsey.com

Ashley Nicolette Frangipane (IPA: /ˌfrændʒɪˈpɑːni/ FRAN-jih-PAH-nee; born September 29, 1994), known professionally as Halsey (/ˈhɔːlzi/ HAWL-zee), is an American singer-songwriter and actress. Noted for her (Note: Halsey uses both she/her and they/them pronouns interchangeably. This article uses she/her pronouns for consistency.) distinctive singing voice, she has received numerous accolades, including three Billboard Music Awards, a Billboard Women in Music Award, and an American Music Award, as well as nominations for three Grammy Awards. She was on Time's annual list of the 100 most influential people in the world in 2020.

Halsey was born and grew up in Central Jersey. Gaining attention from self-released music on social media platforms, she signed with Astralwerks in 2014 and released her debut extended play (EP), Room 93, in October of that year. Her debut studio album, Badlands (2015), was met with critical and commercial success—debuting at number two on the Billboard 200. It was certified double platinum by the Recording Industry Association of America (RIAA), along with its singles "Colors", "Gasoline", and "New Americana", the latter of which became her first entry on the US Billboard Hot 100 at number 60.

In 2016, Halsey co-performed with the Chainsmokers on their single "Closer", which topped the charts in the US and ten countries, also receiving an 18× platinum certification from the RIAA. Her second studio album, Hopeless Fountain Kingdom (2017) embodied a more "radio-friendly" sound and debuted atop the Billboard 200, while its singles "Now or Never" and "Bad at Love", both entered the top 20 of the Billboard Hot 100—the latter peaked within the top five. Her 2018 single, "Eastside" (with Benny Blanco and Khalid), found continued success and peaked within the top ten. Later that year, she was moved to Capitol Records.

Halsey's third studio album, Manic (2020), became her best-selling album worldwide. Its lead single, "Without Me" topped the Billboard Hot 100, received a diamond certification from the RIAA, and yielded her furthest commercial success as a lead artist. Her fourth album, If I Can't Have Love, I Want Power (2021), moved away from her previous sound in favor of a darker industrial sound to generally positive reception. She then parted ways with Capitol in 2023, following a controversy surrounding the release of her non-album single "So Good" the year prior. After signing with Columbia Records, Halsey's fifth studio album The Great Impersonator followed in 2024. By 2020, Billboard reported that her albums had sold over one million combined units, and received over six billion streams in the United States. Aside from music, she has been involved in suicide prevention awareness, sexual assault victim advocacy, and racial justice protests.

== Early life ==
Ashley Nicolette Frangipane was born on September 29, 1994, in Edison, New Jersey, the daughter of Nicole and Chris Frangipane. Her parents dropped out of college after her mother discovered that she was pregnant with her. Halsey's mother works as an emergency medical technician (EMT), while her father manages a car dealership. Her mother has Italian and Hungarian ancestry, while her father is African American with a small amount of Irish ancestry. She has two younger brothers named Sevian and Dante. She played the violin, viola, and cello, before taking up playing the guitar when she was 14 years old. She grew up listening to Alanis Morissette, Justin Bieber, and Brand New. Throughout her childhood, her family moved frequently, as her parents worked many jobs. By the time she became a teenager, she had enrolled in six schools. She was raised Catholic.

Frangipane was bullied at school, and a suicide attempt at the age of 17 led to her being hospitalized for nearly three weeks. Following this, she was diagnosed with bipolar disorder, with which her mother was also diagnosed. Halsey began using drugs soon after, saying her bipolar disorder caused her to become an "unconventional child". At age 17, she became romantically involved with a man who was 24 and resided near Halsey Street station in Brooklyn, from which she took her stage name. She said, "That's where I first start[ed] writing music and where I started to feel like I was a part of something bigger than my town in middle of nowhere New Jersey. Halsey is kind of like a manifestation of all the exaggerated parts of me, so it's like an alter ego." In 2012, she graduated from Warren Hills Regional High School in Washington, New Jersey.

After graduating, Frangipane enrolled in the Rhode Island School of Design, but she withdrew due to financial hardship and instead attended community college. She eventually dropped out of community college and was kicked out by her parents, who she said "just didn't agree with a lot of things about [her]". Soon after, she lived in a basement in Lower Manhattan with a group of "degenerate stoners" she knew through her then-boyfriend. When she was not living there, she occasionally lived in one of New York's many homeless shelters, and she considered prostitution as a way to make money. When describing this period of her life, she has said, "I remember one time I had $9 in my bank account, and bought a four-pack of Red Bull and used it to stay up overnight over the course of two or three days, because it was less dangerous to not sleep than it was to sleep somewhere random and maybe get raped or kidnapped." She would occasionally stay with her maternal grandmother during this time.

== Career ==
=== 2012–2014: Career beginnings and Room 93 ===
Frangipane started writing music when she was 17, and in 2012, she began posting videos to social media sites such as YouTube and Kik, and in particular Tumblr, under the username se7enteenblack. She became known for a parody of Taylor Swift's song "I Knew You Were Trouble", inspired by Swift's relationship with Harry Styles. She then wrote a follow-up song about their relationship, which was posted online in early 2013. In early 2014, Frangipane went to a party and met a "music guy" who asked her to collaborate on a song with him because he liked her voice. The result, a song about her ex-boyfriend, titled "Ghost", was posted by Frangipane on SoundCloud several weeks after it was recorded. Within hours, the song gained online popularity and she was subsequently contacted by several record labels, with the song eventually charting and going on radio. She signed with Astralwerks, feeling that they gave her more creative freedom than other labels that contacted her.

Following this, Frangipane played numerous acoustic shows in different cities under several stage names. She chose Halsey as her permanent stage name because it is an anagram of her first name and is also a reference to the Halsey Street station of the New York City Subway in Brooklyn, a place where she spent a lot of time as a teenager. She also stated Halsey was the most popular name she used. Having written poems for years, Halsey began writing more serious songs as a way to promote them. Music became her "confessional approach" and a form of therapy after the difficult life she had endured. Halsey began touring with The Kooks in August 2014 and performed various original songs. She released her debut extended play, Room 93, on October 27, 2014. The EP charted in the lower regions of the US Billboard 200 and at number three on the Top Heatseekers chart.

=== 2015–2016: Badlands ===
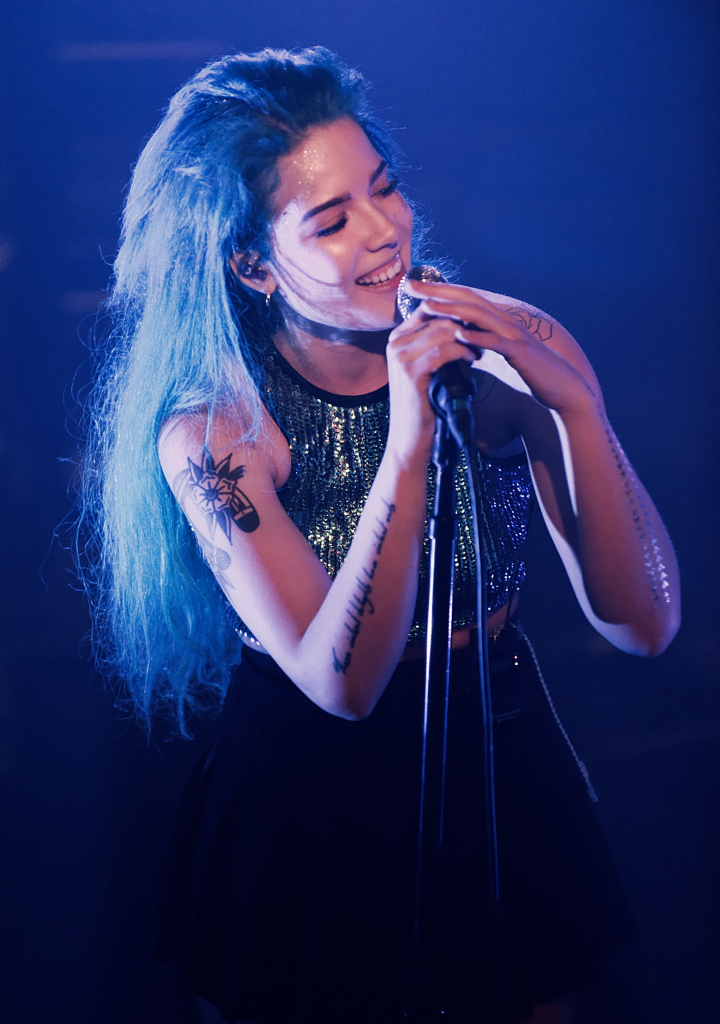
Halsey performing at The Troubadour in Los Angeles during the Badlands Tour, March 2015

Halsey then began work on her debut studio album and performed songs from it at South by Southwest in 2015, where she was the most tweeted-about performer of the night. She embarked on a co-headlining tour with Young Rising Sons in March, and in June, she became the opening act for Imagine Dragons during the North American leg of their Smoke + Mirrors Tour (2015).

Halsey's debut studio album, Badlands, was released on August 28, 2015. She said Badlands is a concept album about a dystopian future society known as "The Badlands", which was a metaphor for her mental state at the time and that each song meant something different to them. She wrote all of the songs on the album when she was 19, and the album has a number of producers, including then-boyfriend, Norwegian producer Lido. The album was described by Halsey as not having a "proper radio hit". It received positive reviews from music critics, with Joe Levy of Rolling Stone citing Halsey as a "new Tumblr popstar with a knack for sticky imagery". Badlands debuted at No. 2 on the Billboard 200 albums chart in the US, selling 115,000 copies in its first week, of which 97,000 were pure album sales. The album found success in several other countries, including Australia, Canada, and New Zealand, where the album debuted in the top three. It was further promoted by Halsey's Badlands Tour (2015–16), and her spot as the opening act for select dates of The Weeknd's The Madness Fall Tour (2015).

Badlands was certified two-times Platinum by the Recording Industry Association of America (RIAA) for US sales of 2,000,000 units. Four singles were released from the album: "Ghost", "New Americana", "Colors", and "Castle", all of which were certified Platinum in the US. The latter three singles achieved minor commercial success: "New Americana" reached number 60 on the US Billboard Hot 100, "Castle" was rerecorded for the soundtrack of the 2016 film The Huntsman: Winter's War. "Gasoline" was not released as a single and was only included on the deluxe version of Badlands, but became one of the album's most popular tracks and was certified Platinum in the US.

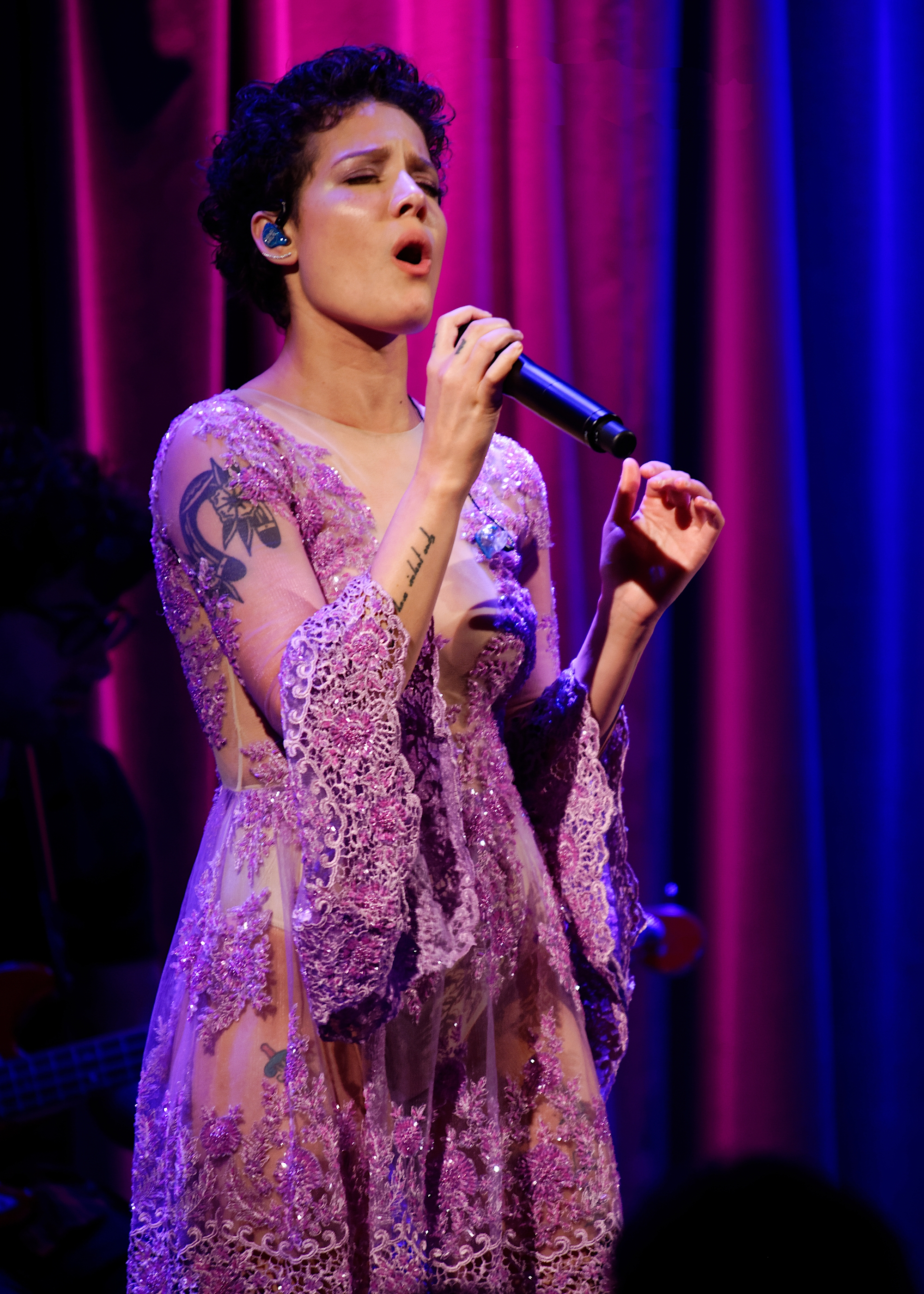
Halsey performing at the Grammy Museum in May 2016

Halsey was featured on the song "The Feeling" by Justin Bieber for his fourth studio album, Purpose (2015). The song was not officially released as a single, though it entered the top forty of the Billboard Hot 100 and was certified Gold in the US and Silver in the United Kingdom. In February 2016, Halsey was one of four female performers to partner with MAC cosmetics for their Future Forward line; she released a lipstick named after herself. The senior vice president and group creative director of the company, James Gager, said, "It feels like a great thing to be able to support artists who are breaking through but aren't necessarily at the top top, to push them forward." In May 2016, Halsey released the song "Tokyo Narita (Freestyle)", produced by Lido. The song was a standalone track that served as a promotional single for both her and Lido. In July 2016, she collaborated with 26 other artists for the charity single "Hands", which was a tribute for the victims of the Pulse nightclub shooting.

On July 29, 2016, Halsey was featured as a vocalist on the Chainsmokers' single "Closer", a song she also cowrote. The track achieved major commercial success: it topped the Billboard Hot 100 for 12 consecutive weeks, topped the charts of 12 other countries, sold more than 15 million units worldwide, and is one of the most streamed songs on Spotify. The official lyric video for "Closer" was released on YouTube on July 29, 2016, and has since garnered over two billion views. Billboard magazine noted Halsey's solo verse as a favorable part of the song, and the song earned her a Grammy Award nomination for Best Pop Duo/Group Performance.

=== 2017–2018: Hopeless Fountain Kingdom ===
Halsey announced work on her second studio album prior to the release of Badlands, with progress on the record continuing throughout 2016 and 2017. In January 2017, she released the single "Not Afraid Anymore"; it appears on the soundtrack of the film Fifty Shades Darker (2017). "Now or Never" was released on April 4 as the lead single from her second studio album. The song debuted at number 52 on the US Billboard Hot 100 and later peaked at number 17. It was certified 2× Platinum by the RIAA. "Now or Never" also reached the top 20 of Australia and Malaysia, and sold 500,000 units outside of the US. Two promotional singles were also made available prior to the release of the album: "Eyes Closed" and "Strangers"'.

The record, Hopeless Fountain Kingdom, finally came out on June 2. It consisted of more "radio friendly" songs in comparison to her previous work, which she attributed to her desire to prove she was "more than capable" of creating "radio-ready" music. Much like her debut, Hopeless Fountain Kingdom is a concept album that revolves around a pair of lovers in a tale based on Romeo and Juliet; the project was inspired by her breakup with Lido. The album also focuses on Halsey's bisexuality and on bisexual characters. Hopeless Fountain Kingdom debuted atop the Billboard 200 and the Canadian Albums Chart. First-week sales in the US were of 106,000 units, with 76,000 being pure album sales. Similar to her debut, Hopeless Fountain Kingdom was certified Platinum by the RIAA. Due to its rise to number one, Halsey became the first woman to achieve a number one album in the US in 2017. To promote the record, Halsey embarked on the Hopeless Fountain Kingdom World Tour, which began on September 29, 2017, her twenty-third birthday. The artist also performed surprise DJ sets at Emo Nite in Los Angeles in 2017. The second single from Hopeless Fountain Kingdom, "Bad at Love", was released on August 22. The song peaked at number five in the US, which made it her highest peak as a lead artist at the time. It was certified 4× Platinum by the RIAA, and sold more than 300,000 records outside the US. In December, Halsey's collaboration with then-boyfriend G-Eazy, "Him & I", was released, and later peaked at number 14 on the Billboard Hot 100 and achieved a 2× Platinum certification by the RIAA in the US. The song also reached the top ten of 13 other countries' charts. Halsey also collaborated with the band Thirty Seconds to Mars on the song "Love Is Madness", from their 2018 album America.

On January 13, 2018, Halsey was featured as a musical guest on the American television variety show Saturday Night Live, where she performed "Bad at Love" and "Him & I", with G-Eazy. On March 15, she released "Alone", together with a new version featuring American rapper Big Sean and British rapper Stefflon Don. It was released as the third and final single from Hopeless Fountain Kingdom, and a music video came out in April. "Alone" was certified Platinum by the RIAA and reached number one on Billboard's Dance Club chart, though it only peaked at number 66 on the Billboard Hot 100. Halsey sang with Khalid on Benny Blanco's debut single "Eastside", which was released on July 12, along with a music video discussing various parts of Halsey's life. The song peaked at number nine on the Billboard Hot 100 and topped the charts of five other countries. It was certified 2× Platinum in the US, and sold over one million units outside the country. Also in the same year, she appeared in two films: she voiced Wonder Woman in Teen Titans Go! To the Movies, and cameoed as herself in A Star Is Born, directed by Bradley Cooper. Halsey was also a key advisor on the US version of The Voice in its fifteenth season.

=== 2018–2020: Manic ===
After the release of Hopeless Fountain Kingdom, Halsey was "upstreamed" to Capitol Records, Astralwerks' parent company. Her debut single on the label, "Without Me", was released on October 4, 2018. She stated that the song was very personal to her. On October 29, the official music video for "Without Me" was released, featuring a "G-Eazy lookalike", following their second breakup. This song went on to become Halsey's most successful single as a lead artist to date, becoming her first solo number-one single on the Billboard Hot 100. It topped the chart for two non-consecutive weeks and remained in the top five for 22 weeks. It also reached the top three of the UK, Malaysia, Australia, Canada, New Zealand, and Ireland. The song has been certified 9× Platinum in the US, 2× Platinum in the UK, 8× Platinum in Australia, and 9× Platinum in Canada. Due to "Without Me" reaching number one on the Billboard Hot 100, Halsey became the eighth woman to achieve multiple number ones on the chart during the 2010s.

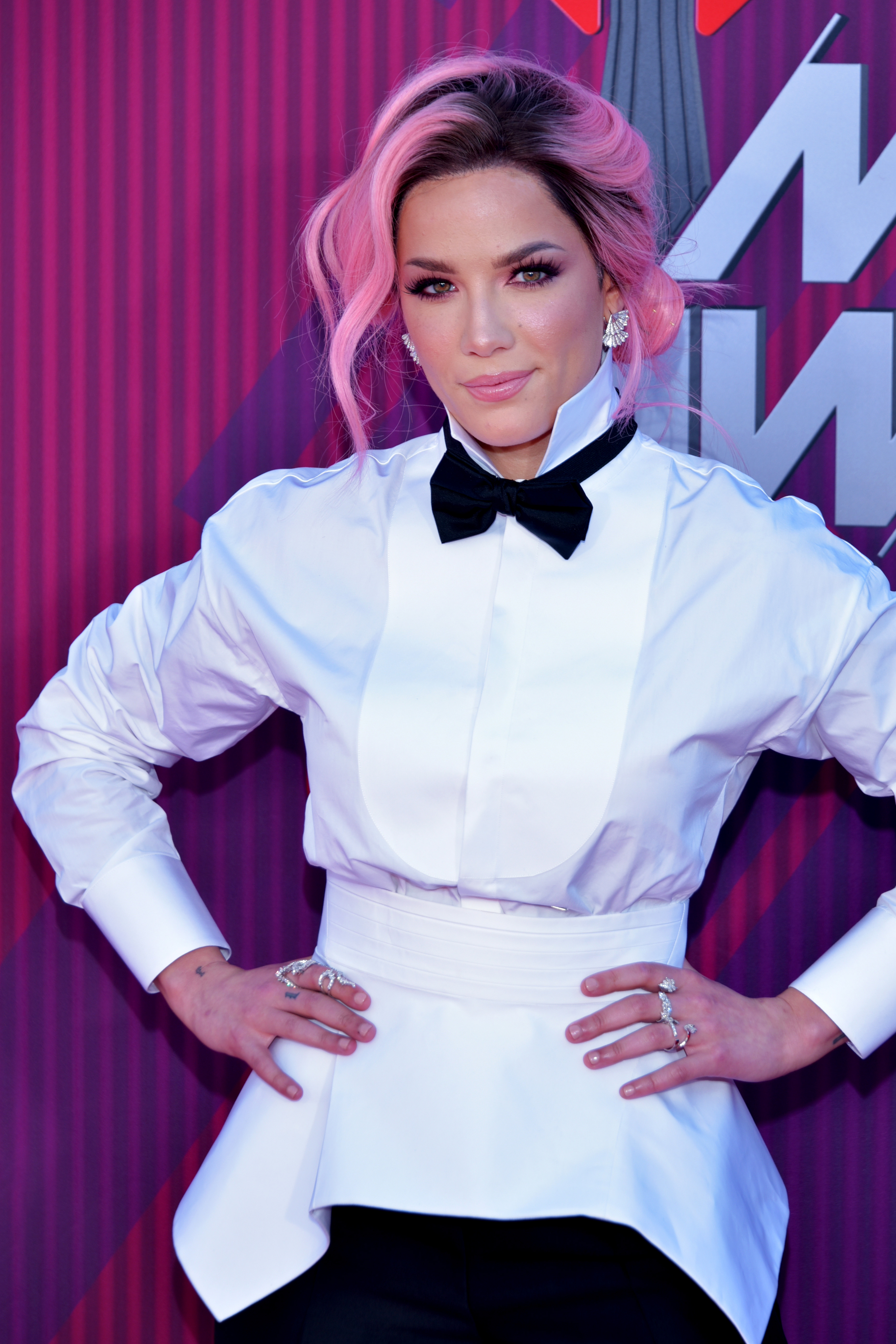
Halsey at the 2019 iHeartRadio Music Awards

The singer made several releases and collaborated with various artists during the first several months of 2019, including a remix of "Without Me", featuring American rapper Juice WRLD on January 9, the song "11 Minutes" with Yungblud (featuring Travis Barker) on February 14, with the accompanying music video released on February 22, and the song "Boy with Luv" with South Korean boy band BTS on April 12, the music video for which became the most–viewed music video within its first 24 hours on YouTube, with 74.6 million views. On April 19, she and 29 other musical acts were featured on the Lil Dicky song "Earth", a charity single about climate change awareness.

On February 9, Halsey again appeared on Saturday Night Live; this time, she was as both host and musical guest. Her performance was praised, with ratings for the show rising and a younger audience watching. In March, she announced that her third studio album would be released in 2019. The album is titled Manic, and was eventually released on January 17, 2020. On May 17, 2019, Halsey issued the single "Nightmare", which debuted and peaked at number fifteen on the US Hot 100. On September 13, 2019, she released the single "Graveyard". On September 23, 2019, Halsey announced the Manic World Tour, in support of her third studio album. The first leg of the tour took place in Europe between February and March 2020. She released a promotional single, "Clementine", on her birthday, September 29, 2019. On January 25, 2020, she again appeared on Saturday Night Live, where she performed two songs from Manic: "You Should Be Sad" and "Finally // Beautiful Stranger". She also appeared in a few sketches.

In December 2019, Halsey appeared on the Bring Me the Horizon EP Music to Listen To.... The band's vocalist, Oli Sykes, later teased additional collaborations; one of them was revealed a month later to be the Oli Sykes and Jordan Fish-produced song "Experiment on Me", from the soundtrack of the superhero film Birds of Prey (2020), which was released on February 7, 2020. A collaboration with Marshmello titled "Be Kind" was released on May 1, with the music video premiering on June 27. On June 25, 2020, Halsey announced that her first book of poetry, entitled I Would Leave Me If I Could, was available for preorder. The same year, she also released her first live album, Badlands (Live from Webster Hall), on August 28. According to Billboard, her albums had sold over one million combined units and received over six billion streams in the United States by 2020.

=== 2021–2023: If I Can't Have Love, I Want Power ===
On August 27, 2021, Halsey released her fourth studio album, If I Can't Have Love, I Want Power, with little prior promotion. Produced by Nine Inch Nails members Trent Reznor and Atticus Ross, it received critical acclaim. Leading up to the album's release, a companion film of the same name was screened at select IMAX theaters; it was later released on HBO Max on October 7. The album was further supported by the single "I Am Not a Woman, I'm a God". If I Can't Have Love, I Want Power debuted at number 2 on the Billboard 200 chart and would become certified Gold by the RIAA in February 2023, but due to a lack of a hit single, had a shorter stay on the charts than her previous albums.

In January 2022, Halsey wrote and produced a song, titled "So Good". When the song was withheld from release due to Capitol needing to test the song's "virality", Halsey posted a TikTok video criticizing Capitol Records on May 22, 2022, for not being allowed to release "So Good" without an "accompanying campaign or TikTok video to make it go viral." Five days prior, without the approval of Capitol, Halsey played a snippet of her song in a TikTok video. In the days following her post, questions arose regarding whether or not Capitol was going to take legal action against her. Music industry attorney Erin M. Jacobson mentioned in an article by Time that "it is rare that a label would sue one of its own artists, especially when the label plans to continue working with that artist. Further, using such a short piece of the record could also be seen as a promotional use." Capitol Records eventually conceded on May 31, 2022, amid criticism and scrutiny from a variety of music artists, and set a release date for the song of June 9, 2022. Although some believed that the release controversy was a marketing stunt, Halsey maintained that it was not fake. Many news outlets commented on the increasing nature, and problem, of pressures for TikTok virality on musicians by record labels.

On February 24, 2023, Halsey released "Die 4 Me". The song is an updated and extended cut of Halsey's verse on the Post Malone song, "Die for Me". On April 15, 2023, it was reported that Halsey and Capitol Records had parted ways. On June 14, 2023, it was announced that Halsey had signed to Columbia Records. On June 21–22, 2023, Halsey performed two string ensemble shows in Newark, New Jersey, at New Jersey Performing Arts Center, performing an orchestra version of some of her discography. She performed the songs "Ya'aburnee" and "Bells in Santa Fe", from If I Can't Have Love, I Want Power live for the first time. In partnership with Hard Rock Live, she scheduled three more orchestra shows, June 24 in Hollywood, Florida; June 30 in Gary, Indiana; and July 2 in Wheatland, California.

=== 2024–present: The Great Impersonator and Back to Badlands tour ===
On June 4, 2024, Halsey released "The End", the lead promotional single of her fifth studio album The Great Impersonator, which deals with her health battles. On July 26, 2024, she released "Lucky" as the official lead single of the album. The song samples Britney Spears' 2000 single of the same name. She has appeared as Tabby Martin in MaXXXine, the third film of the X trilogy. Halsey released a third single, "Lonely Is the Muse" on August 15. The song describes efforts to avoid being defined by others and exploited.

On September 6, she released a fourth single, "Ego", alongside a video clip, which she wrote and directed, playing a double role in it where the characters try to kill each other. She also performed it at the 2024 MTV Video Music Awards, embracing more its 1990s aesthetic by creating her ideal "90s garage rock band" alongside Victoria De Angelis on bass, Jazzelle Zanaughtti on synths and Maya Stepansky on drums. The album was released on October 25, 2024. In order to reveal the album's different covers, she organized a hunt of clues an campsules with items reminding of different decades around major cities in the world for her fans to find. She also announced in the beginning of October that she would impersonate a different celebrity and release a snippet of a song that they have inspired through her Instagram account.

On August 28, 2025, Halsey announced the Back to Badlands Tour, with 22 shows across North America, Europe and Australia spanning from October 2025 through February 2026. The tour served as a ten-year anniversary celebration for her debut album Badlands. Prior to the announcement of the tour, Halsey released new music videos for singles "Gasoline" and "Drive" in celebration of the album's anniversary. Halsey also released a special ten year anniversary edition of Badlands on August 29, 2025. Halsey later took on a producing role for the comedy-drama film Our Hero, Balthazar, which also stars her fiancé, Avan Jogia. The film had its initial premiere on June 8, 2025, and was later re-distributed by Picturehouse and WG in March 2026.

== Artistry ==
=== Influences ===
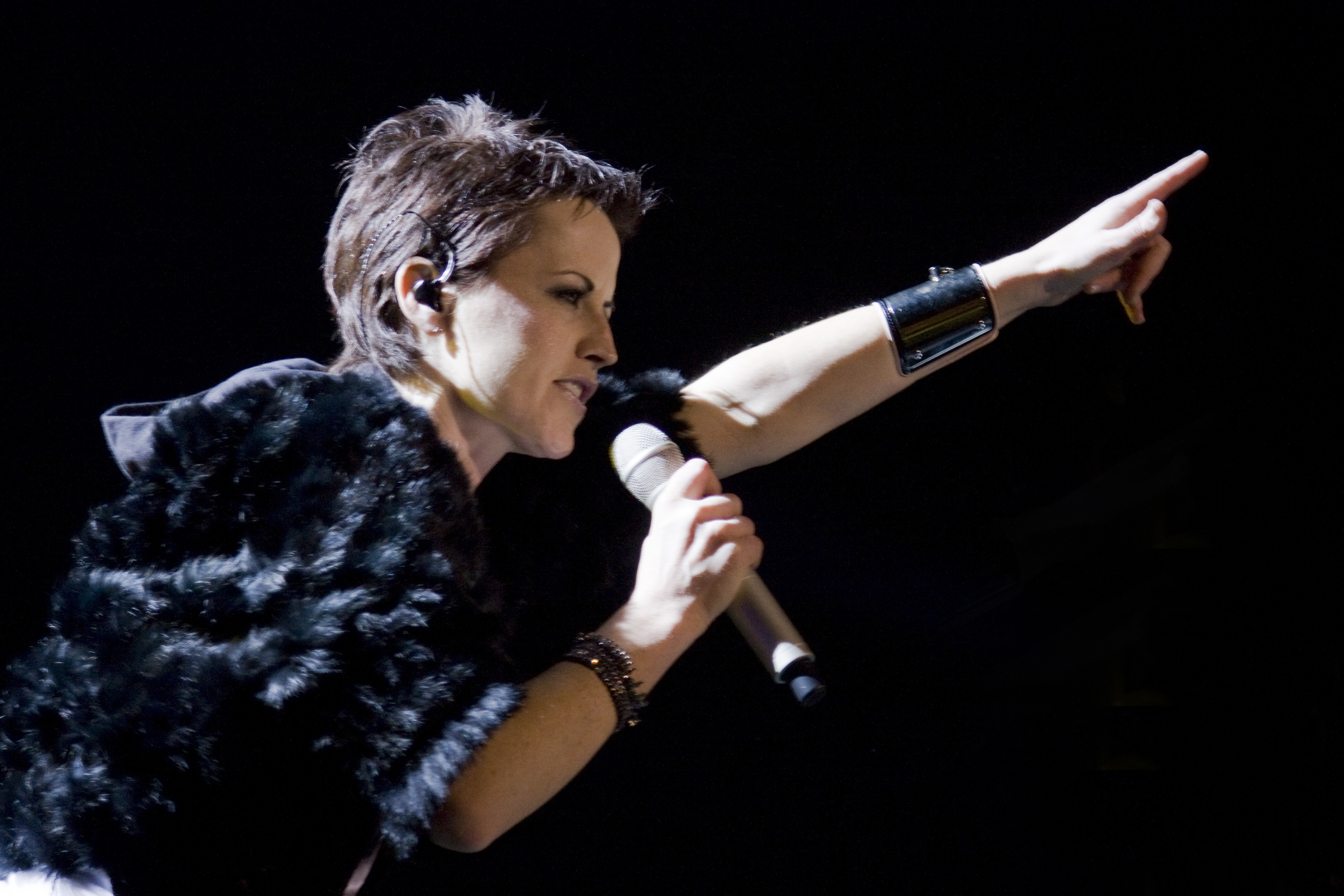
Halsey has called Dolores O'Riordan (pictured) a "massive influence" on her and credits O'Riordan for influencing her "unconventional" vocal technique.

During Halsey's childhood, her mother listened to the Cure, Alanis Morissette, and Nirvana, while her father listened to the Notorious B.I.G., Slick Rick, Bone Thugs-n-Harmony, and Tupac Shakur. She has said that their musical tastes have been a great influence on her. She was "really influenced" by Matty Healy's lyrical approach stating: "His lyrical content is a lot of dialogue, a lot of places. It's very descriptive and it creates this honest, authentic image." Halsey also called Panic! at the Disco the "band that changed [her] fucking life" and credited Lady Gaga for giving them the strength to be herself. Having begun her online presence as a One Direction fan, she "loved [them] with an all-consuming force when I was younger". She has also mentioned the Long Island emo band Brand New as both an influence and a favorite of hers, once changing her biography on Instagram to "The Devil and God Are Raging Inside Me", a reference to their third album. Halsey also cited Taylor Swift as a huge reason why she always insists on writing her own music. While touring for the tenth anniversary of Badlands, Halsey named Ellie Goulding as someone she "looked up to" early in her career, and described herself as a "really big fan". Her other influences include Mick Jagger, David Bowie, Bob Dylan, Jimi Hendrix, Christina Aguilera, Marilyn Manson, Beck, Kanye West, Amy Winehouse, the Weeknd, Alex Turner, Bright Eyes, Nine Inch Nails, and the Wonder Years.

Halsey credited Dolores O'Riordan as her major vocal influence, saying: "Dolores O'Riordan was a massive influence for me. I grew up listening to the Cranberries with my mother and learned so much about having an unconventional singing voice. Dolores taught me how to use my voice in a manner that was emotive, even if I wasn't classically skilled... Her voice was beautiful to me. And she was a fierce badass trailblazing woman in the rock landscape... Always an inspiration to me..." Halsey said: "There's plenty of musicians that I love and respect, but I think that I'm the most inspired by cinema." Filmmakers who have influenced her include Quentin Tarantino, Harmony Korine, and Larry Clark.

=== Music style and themes ===
"Roman Holiday"
Sample of the song "Roman Holiday", displaying Halsey's electropop and alternative pop style

Halsey is noted for her distinctive "indie" style of singing, which has garnered controversial feedback. She sings with an accent different from her speaking voice. Halsey's music often encompasses pop, electronic, alternative, R&B, and rock genres, specifically falling under the styles of alternative pop, alternative R&B, alternative rock, arena pop, art pop, electropop, indie pop, and synth-pop. The New York Times' Jon Caramanica noted, "Halsey arrived as part of a slew of female pop rebels who emerged in the wake of Lorde's early-2010s recalibration of the genre's operating hierarchies." When speaking of Badlands, Billboard stated, "Halsey's larger-than-life vision combines the synthy darkness of Lorde, the neon-pop chutzpah of Miley Cyrus and the flickering film noir of Lana Del Rey."

Halsey's music focuses on her personal experiences and telling a story. She writes about relationships with other women in her music as a way of solidifying her bisexuality.

=== Videos and stage ===
The biggest influence on her live performances is Adam Lazzara, the frontman of Taking Back Sunday; she noted, "One of the most inspiring things I've ever seen is watching [Taking Back Sunday] live and watching Adam use that microphone as a prop and I thought yep, I'm gonna do that."

== Public image ==
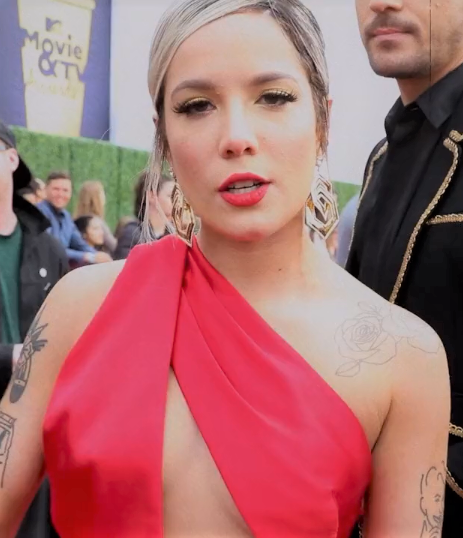
Halsey at the 2018 MTV Movie & TV Awards at the Barker Hangar in Los Angeles

In her early career, Halsey drew criticism for allegedly calling herself "tri-bi" in an interview, due to her being biracial, bipolar, and bisexual. In a 2016 interview with Rolling Stone, she criticized the label as a trivializing way to describe her. Halsey became most known for her signature dyed blue hair in her early career. She sparked controversy in 2016 after several fan interactions, some involving the artist kissing underage fans.

In June 2017, Halsey received backlash for collaborating with Quavo, an artist who has made homophobic remarks. She stated she has never spoken to Quavo, and continued to say that she would not put "a lot of people" in her songs. She criticized Iggy Azalea for her "complete disregard for black culture". She also criticized Demi Lovato for, in Halsey's view, treating bisexuality as taboo in the song "Cool for the Summer".

Halsey has described herself as an "in-between role model" and an "inconvenient woman", due to her music and style. She stated in 2017 that although she passes as white, she is a black woman and proud of her heritage. She was included on Forbes' 30 Under 30 list, and appeared on the cover of magazines such as Billboard, Paper, and Playboy. She has appeared in advertisements for Jeep, Beats Electronics, and ModCloth.

At other times, she has been described as a feminist icon. She has also been called the "voice of her generation". Her relationship with G-Eazy gathered significant media attention due to rumors of drug use, arrest, cheating, and G-Eazy's feuds with other artists.

Much of her music is labeled as pop, however Halsey has long identified as an alternative artist. She feels that she can do pop collaborations without being considered a pop artist, similar to Kendrick Lamar. She said she is only classified as pop because she is a woman. In 2019, she called herself "the anti-popstar" and stated she does not care how people identify her music, as long as it connects with them. In 2020, Time magazine listed her in annual list of the 100 most influential people in the world.

== Activism ==
During the 2016 presidential election, Halsey was an avid supporter of Bernie Sanders and urged fans to vote for him. In July 2016, she and 26 other artists were featured on the charity single "Hands", which was a tribute to the victims of the Pulse nightclub shooting. During the 2020 Democratic Party presidential primaries, Halsey further endorsed Sanders on March 11, 2020, urging fans to vote for him via social media and a promotional video collaborating with the Sanders campaign.

As a result of her own attempted suicide at age 17, Halsey took part in the mental health and suicide prevention awareness campaign called "I'm Listening", which was hosted by radio network Entercom and broadcast live on September 10, 2017.

Halsey identifies as a feminist. Following the 2017 Women's March, she sent out a tweet that promised to donate one dollar to Planned Parenthood for every retweet it received. She ended up donating $100,000 to the organization. Halsey delivered a speech to more than 200,000 protesters at the 2018 Women's March. Instead of a traditional speech, she performed a five-minute poem titled "A Story Like Mine", in which she told personal stories of sexual assault and violence throughout her life. Her personal narrative included accompanying her best friend to Planned Parenthood after she had been raped, her personal account of sexual assault by neighbors and boyfriends, and women sexually assaulted by Olympic physician Larry Nassar. She completed her speech by requesting all—"Black, Asian, poor, wealthy, trans, cis, Muslim, Christian"—sexual assault victims to listen and support each other. AJ Willingham of CNN opined in a headline that "Halsey's Women's March speech moved people around the world." In March 2018, Halsey protested alongside numerous other celebrities at March for Our Lives in Washington, D.C. In May 2018, she criticized Ivanka Trump over Twitter for staying silent on her father, then-president Donald Trump's family separation policy.

In November 2018, Halsey performed at the Victoria's Secret Fashion Show alongside numerous other artists, but in December she criticized the company for its lack of inclusion of transgender models in its various shows, stating, "as a member of the LGBT+ community, I have no tolerance for a lack of inclusivity. Especially not motivated by stereotype." Later that month, she performed her hit song "Without Me" on The Voice and was criticized for "sensually" dancing with backup dancer Jade Chynoweth. Many perceived the backlash as homophobic, including Halsey herself who defended the performance. In a January 2019 interview with Glamour, she advocated for a stronger presence of women in music. In April 2019, she and 29 other musical acts were featured on the charity single "Earth", which raises climate change awareness. In May 2020, Halsey, alongside Yungblud, joined protests in Los Angeles for racial justice in the wake of the murder of George Floyd.

In June 2020, she launched The Black Creators Fund, founded to provide financial support, resources, and a platform to black creators.

== Personal life ==
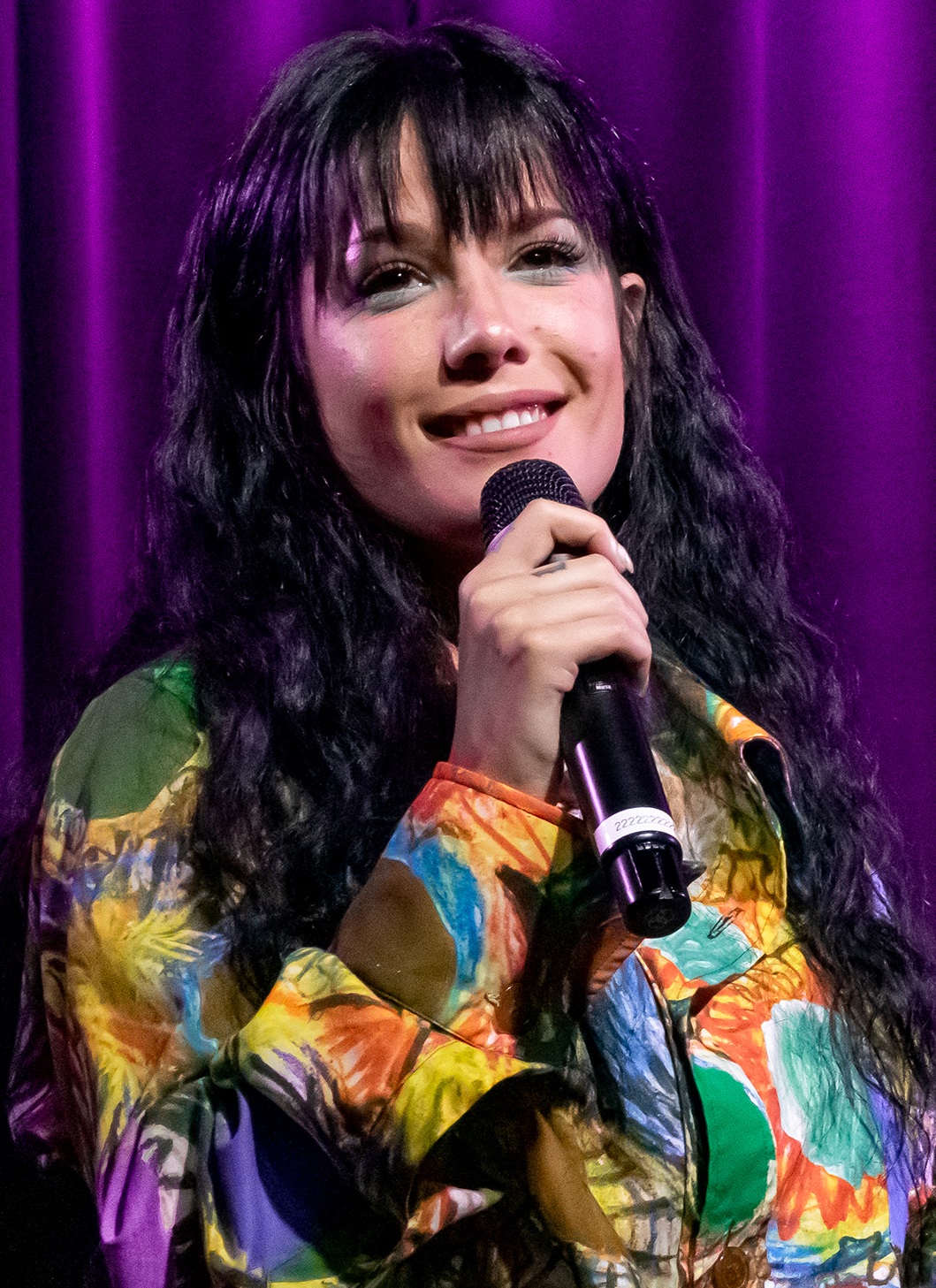
Halsey performing at the Grammy Museum in Los Angeles in 2019

Halsey is openly bisexual. Prior to her music career, she dated a woman. In March 2021, she announced that she uses both she/her and they/them pronouns.

=== Relationships ===
Halsey dated English musician Matty Healy until 2015. She met him at a concert by his band The 1975, of which she said she was a huge fan. She has said that he was influential when she first started writing music. From 2015 to 2016, she dated Norwegian producer Lido, who helped produce Badlands and inspired Hopeless Fountain Kingdom. In 2017, she and American rapper G-Eazy had a relationship. They had met at a party that year and found musical common ground for their collaboration "Him & I", which discussed their love and lifestyle. They broke up in July 2018, though their relationship was on-and-off-again until ending that September. She later confirmed that her 2018 song "Without Me" is partially about this relationship. She dated English musician Yungblud from November 2018 to September 2019, and actor Evan Peters from October 2019 to March 2020.

In July 2021, Halsey's son with Turkish-American screenwriter Alev Aydin was born. The couple amicably separated at an unknown date. In April 2023, Halsey filed for primary physical custody of their son so she could take him on tour with her, as well as requesting joint legal custody and joint expenses with Aydin. The two co-parent, with Halsey also requesting that Aydin have reasonable visitation rights and the ability to make health and education decisions for their son.

In 2023, Halsey and Canadian actor Avan Jogia began dating. In September 2024, she announced their engagement.

=== Health ===
Since the beginning of her career, Halsey has been open about her health issues. In 2015, she said she is "just this fucked up stoner kid who made it".

Halsey has bipolar disorder. She was diagnosed with the mental disorder at age 17, and said that her mother also has it. At that age, she attempted suicide, which is what led to her diagnosis and a 17-day admission to a psychiatric hospital. Not long after her suicide attempt, she began having success in the music industry. She said that singing and performing helped her manage the symptoms she experiences. Despite the struggles she has faced as a result of this mood disorder, she said that she embraces being bipolar because it makes her "really empathetic". On December 11, 2021, Halsey informed fans via Twitter that she was diagnosed with attention deficit hyperactivity disorder (ADHD) in high school and that she assumed she just grew out of it; however, she is now medicated for it as a result of seeking mental health treatment during the COVID-19 pandemic.

Halsey was diagnosed with endometriosis in 2016 and went public with it on Twitter. She attributes a miscarriage she suffered in 2015 to her endometriosis, originally stating in 2016 that it was due to her hectic touring schedule. Only hours after she realized she was having a miscarriage, she went on stage to perform during a tour because she did not want to hurt her career by missing a performance. She chronicled her struggles with endometriosis on the talk show The Doctors in April 2018, where she revealed she was going to freeze her eggs.

Also in 2018, Halsey spoke openly about her endometriosis and the pain it causes at the Blossom Ball, which is run by the Endometriosis Foundation of America. She said at the event, "Sometimes I'm bloated, I'm on an IV, I'm sick, I'm on medicine, and I'm backstage, terrified that I'm going to bleed through my clothes in the middle of my show." She told the event's attendees that she wanted to speak out about her condition because the media often portrays her as having perfect physical health despite her health struggles. In January 2017, she underwent surgery in an attempt to lessen the pain caused by the condition. She has not disclosed what type of surgery she had.

Halsey is gluten intolerant. On August 14, 2019, she revealed on Twitter that she had quit smoking cigarettes after a decade. Halsey has been diagnosed with Ehlers–Danlos syndrome, Sjögren's disease, mast cell activation syndrome, and POTS (postural orthostatic tachycardia syndrome). On June 5, 2024, Halsey disclosed her diagnoses of lupus and a rare T cell lymphoproliferative disorder.

== Discography ==
- Badlands (2015)
- Hopeless Fountain Kingdom (2017)
- Manic (2020)
- If I Can't Have Love, I Want Power (2021)
- The Great Impersonator (2024)

== Filmography ==
=== Music videos ===
| Year | Song title | Role | Notes |
|---|---|---|---|
| 2017 | "Now or Never" | Co-director | Co-directed with Sing J Lee |
| 2017 | "Bad at Love" | Co-director | Co-directed with Sing J Lee |
| 2018 | "Sorry" | Co-director | Co-directed with Sing J Lee |
| 2018 | "Alone" (featuring Big Sean and Stefflon Don) | Co-director | Co-directed with Hannah Lux Davis |
| 2018 | "Strangers" (featuring Lauren Jauregui) | Co-director | Co-directed with Jessie Hill |
| 2018 | "I Found You" (Benny Blanco) | Herself | Cameo appearance |

=== Film ===
| Year | Title | Role | Notes |
|---|---|---|---|
| 2018 | Teen Titans Go! To the Movies | Wonder Woman | Voice |
| 2018 | A Star Is Born | Herself | Cameo |
| 2021 | If I Can't Have Love, I Want Power | Queen Lila / Lilith | Companion hour-long film to the album of the same name |
| 2021 | Sing 2 | Porsha Crystal | Voice |
| 2023 | Americana | Mandy Starr | |
| 2024 | MaXXXine | Tabby Martin | |

=== Television ===
| Year | Title | Role | Notes |
|---|---|---|---|
| 2016 | Roadies | Herself | Episodes: "The Load Out" and "Carpet Season" |
| 2017 | American Dad! | Cindy | Voice, episode: "A Nice Night for a Drive" |
| 2018–2021 | Saturday Night Live | Herself (musical performer/host) | 5 episodes (Note: In episode 885, which aired on November 10, 2018, Halsey made a surprise appearance and performed "Can't Be Broken" with Lil Wayne.) |
| 2018 | RuPaul's Drag Race | Herself/guest judge | Episode: "PharmaRusical" |
| 2018 | The Doctors | Celebrity guest | Episode: "10126" |
| 2018 | The Voice | Guest performer/Guest advisor | Season 14: Guest performer Season 15: Guest advisor for Team Jennifer, guest performer |
| 2020 | Scooby-Doo and Guess Who? | Herself | Voice, episode: "The New York Underground!" |
| 2020 | The Disney Family Singalong: Volume II | Performer | Television special |

=== Web ===
| Year | Title | Role | Notes |
|---|---|---|---|
| 2019–2020 | Road to Manic | Herself | Web series; 10 episodes |
| 2026 | The Girl in the Tower | Herself | Concert film |

== Tours and live performances ==
=== Headlining ===
- Badlands Tour (2015–2016)
- Hopeless Fountain Kingdom World Tour (2017–2018)
- Manic World Tour (2020)
- Love and Power Tour (2022)
- For My Last Trick: The Tour (2025)
- Back to Badlands Tour (2025–2026)
- The Girl in the Tower: Halsey - Live in Europe (2026)

=== Co-headlining ===
- The American Youth Tour (2015) (with Young Rising Sons)

=== Opening act ===
- Imagine Dragons – Smoke + Mirrors Tour (2015)
- The Weeknd – The Madness Fall Tour (2015)

=== Promotional and live performances ===
| Date | Event | Performed song(s) | Ref. |
|---|---|---|---|
| 2015 | Vevo Lift | Hold me Down, New Americana, Badlands & Ghost | |
| 2016 | Vevo Lift | Roman Holiday & Is There Somewhere | |
| 2016 | MTV Video Music Awards | Closer | |
| 2016 | Nobel Peace Prize Concert | Castle & Colors | |
| 2016 | Outside Lands Festival | | |
| 2016 | Sweetlife Festival | | |
| 2017 | Vevo Presents | Now or Never, Heaven in Hiding, Walls Could Talk, Lie, Strangers, Eyes Closed & 100 Letters | |
| 2017 | The Tonight Show with Jimmy Fallon | Now or Never | |
| 2017 | IHeart Radio Summer 2017 | Bad at Love | |
| 2017 | Good Morning America | Him & I | |
| 2017 | Dick Clark's New Year's Rockin’ Eve | Him & I | |
| 2018 | Saturday Night Live | Bad at Love | |
| 2018 | Victoria Secret Fashion Show | Without Me | |
| 2018 | Saturday Night Live | Him & I & Bad at Love | |
| 2018 | American Music Awards | Eastside | |
| 2019 | Saturday Night Live | Without Me & Eastside | |
| 2019 | Dick Clark's New Year's Rockin’ Eve | Without Me | |
| 2019 | The Voice | Nightmare | |
| 2019 | Billboard Music Awards | Boy with Luv, Without Me | |
| 2019 | Capital Summertime Ball | Eastside, Nightmare, Closer, Without Me | |
| 2020 | The Ellen Show | Graveyard | |
| 2020 | MTV Europe Music Awards | Graveyard | |
| 2020 | American Music Awards | Graveyard | |
| 2020 | ARIA Awards | Graveyard | |
| 2020 | Saturday Night Live | You Should Be Sad & Finally // Beautiful Stranger | |
| 2021 | Saturday Night Live | I Am Not a Woman, I'm a God & Darling | |
| 2022 | Hangout Festival | Nightmare, Castle, Easier Than Lying, You Should Be Sad, 1121, Die for Me, Graveyard, Colors, Hurricane, The Lighthouse, Be Kind (stripped), Honey, 3am, Bad at Love, Gasoline, Nightmare (reprise), Without Me | |
| 2024 | IHeart Radio Music Festival | Nightmare, You Should Be Sad, Closer, Without Me & Ego | |
| 2024 | MTV Video Music Awards | Ego | |
| 2024 | Flow Festival | Life of the Spider, Nightmare, Castle, Easier Than Lying, You Should Be Sad, Graveyard, Lucky, Hurricane, The Lighthouse, Honey, Bad at Love, 3am, Closer (Rock Version), Lonely Is the Muse (Snippet), Gasoline, Experiment on Me, I Am Not a Woman I'm a God, Without Me | |
| 2024 | Vevo Live | Panic Attack | |

== Awards and nominations ==
Hasley has received three Billboard Music Awards, a Billboard Women in Music Award, and an American Music Award, as well as nominations for three Grammy Awards.

== See also ==
- LGBTQ culture in New York City
- List of artists who reached number one in the United States
- List of artists who reached number one on the US Dance Club Songs chart
- List of artists who reached number one on the U.S. Pop Airplay chart
- List of American Grammy Award winners and nominees
- List of people with bipolar disorder
- Multiracial Americans
