= Badlands Tour =

2015–16 concert tour by Halsey

- Tour by Halsey
- Associated album: Badlands
- Start date: September 30, 2015
- End date: September 18, 2016
- No. of shows: 85
- Supporting acts: LANY; Flor; Børns; Bad Suns; Bea Miller; Oh Wonder
- Website: badlandstour.com

Halsey concert chronology
- The American Youth Tour (2015); Badlands Tour (2015–2016); Hopeless Fountain Kingdom Tour (2017–2018)

The Badlands Tour was the first headlining concert tour by American singer-songwriter Halsey, launched in support of her (Note: Halsey uses both she/her and they/them pronouns and switches between them; this article uses she/her pronouns for consistency.) debut album, Badlands (2015). The tour began on September 30, 2015, at the House of Blues in San Diego, California, and concluded on September 18, 2016, at the Marina Bay Street Circuit in Singapore.

== Shows ==
List of 2015 concerts, showing date, city, country, venue, opening acts, tickets sold, and gross revenue
Date	City	Country	Venue	Opening act	Attendance	Revenue
September 30, 2015	San Diego	United States	House of Blues San Diego	LANY	1,500 / 1,500	$34,231
October 1, 2015	Scottsdale	United States	Livewire	LANY	1,500 / 1,500	$34,231
October 4, 2015 (Note: The shows on October 4 and 11, 2015 in Austin, Texas were part of the Austin City Limits Music Festival.)	Austin	United States	Zilker Park	—	—	—
October 7, 2015	Houston	United States	House of Blues Houston	LANY	2,500 / 2,500	$58,343
October 8, 2015	Dallas	United States	South Side Ballroom	LANY	3,800 / 3,800	$109,273
October 11, 2015	Austin	United States	Zilker Park	—	—	—
October 16, 2015	Atlanta	United States	Buckhead Theatre	Flor	1,800 / 1,800	$38,170
October 17, 2015 (Note: Venue upgrade from The Beacham.)	Lake Buena Vista	United States	House of Blues Orlando	Flor	2,600 / 2,600	$38,144
October 19, 2015	Philadelphia	United States	Union Transfer	Flor	1,200 / 1,200	$27,900
October 20, 2015	Washington, D.C.	United States	9:30 Club	Flor	1,200 / 1,200	$24,000
October 22, 2015	New York City	United States	Webster Hall	Flor	3,000 / 3,000	$68,434
October 23, 2015	New York City	United States	Webster Hall	Flor	3,000 / 3,000	$68,434
October 24, 2015	Boston	United States	House of Blues Boston	Flor	2,500 / 2,500	$63,800
October 27, 2015	Columbus	United States	Newport Music Hall	Flor	1,400 / 1,400	$25,900
October 28, 2015	Chicago	United States	The Vic Theatre	Flor	2,800 / 2,800	$53,200
October 29, 2015	Chicago	United States	The Vic Theatre	Flor	2,800 / 2,800	$53,200
November 2, 2015 (Note: Venue upgrade from The Corona Theatre.)	Montreal	Canada	Métropolis	Flor	2,298 / 2,298	$35,144
November 3, 2015 (Note: Venue upgrade from The Hoxton.)	Toronto	Canada	Phoenix Concert Theatre	Flor	—	—
November 6, 2015	Minneapolis	United States	Varsity Theater	Flor	—	—
November 9, 2015	Englewood	United States	Gothic Theatre	Flor	—	—
November 12, 2015	Seattle	United States	Showbox SoDo	Flor	—	—
November 13, 2015	Vancouver	Canada	Rio Theatre	Flor	—	—
November 14, 2015	Portland	United States	Wonder Ballroom	Flor	—	—
November 16, 2015	San Francisco	United States	The Fillmore	Flor	—	—
November 18, 2015	Los Angeles	United States	The Fonda Theatre	Flor	—	—
November 19, 2015	Los Angeles	United States	The Fonda Theatre	Flor	—	—
November 21, 2015 (Note: The show on November 21, 2015 in Mexico City was part of Corona Capital.)	Mexico City	Mexico	Rodríguez Brothers Racetrack	—		
December 29, 2015 (Note: The shows on December 29 and 30, 2015 and January 2, 2016 in Australia were part of the Falls Festival.)	Waurn Ponds	Australia	Mt Dundeed Estate	—	—	—
December 30, 2015	Bream Creek	Australia	Marion Bay Falls Festival	—	—	—

List of 2016 concerts, showing date, city, country, venue, opening acts, tickets sold, and gross revenue
Date	City	Country	Venue	Opening act	Attendance	Revenue
January 1, 2016 (Note: The show on January 1, 2016 in Sydney, New South Wales was part of Field Day.)	Sydney	Australia	The Domain			
January 2, 2016	Yelgun	Australia	North Byron Parklands			
January 6, 2016	Melbourne	Australia	Palais Theatre	BØRNS		
January 7, 2016	Sydney	Australia	Metro Theatre	BØRNS		
January 8, 2016	Sydney	Australia	Metro Theatre	BØRNS		
January 10, 2016 (Note: The show on January 10, 2016 in Busselton, West Australia was part of Southbound.)	Busselton	Australia	Sir Stewart Bovell Park	N/A		
January 23, 2016	Honolulu	United States	Republik	N/A	—	—
February 17, 2016	Stockholm	Sweden	Munich Brewery	BØRNS	—	—
February 19, 2016	Glasgow	Scotland	O_{2} Academy Glasgow	BØRNS	—	—
February 20, 2016	Birmingham	England	O_{2} Institute	BØRNS	—	—
February 22, 2016	Manchester	England	Manchester Academy	BØRNS	—	—
February 23, 2016	London	England	O_{2} Academy Brixton	BØRNS	—	—
February 26, 2016	Amsterdam	Netherlands	The Max	BØRNS	—	—
February 27, 2016	Copenhagen	Denmark	DR Concert Hall	BØRNS	—	—
February 28, 2016	Oslo	Norway	Sentrum Scene	BØRNS	—	—
March 2, 2016	Cologne	Germany	E-Werk	BØRNS	—	—
March 3, 2016	Berlin	Germany	New World	BØRNS	—	—
March 5, 2016	Milan	Italy	Fabrique	BØRNS	—	—
March 7, 2016	Barcelona	Spain	Razzmatazz	BØRNS	—	—
March 9, 2016	Paris	France	The Cicada	BØRNS	—	—
March 12, 2016 (Note: The show on March 12, 2016 in São Paulo was part of Lollapalooza Brazil.)	São Paulo	Brazil	José Carlos Pace Racetrack	N/A	—	—
March 18, 2016 (Note: The show on March 18, 2016 in Buenos Aires was part of Lollapalooza Argentina.)	Buenos Aires	Argentina	San Isidro Racecourse	N/A	—	—
March 19, 2016 (Note: The show on March 19, 2016 in Santiago was part of Lollapalooza Chile.)	Santiago	Chile	O'Higgins Park	N/A	—	—
April 16, 2016 (Note: The shows on April 16 and 23, 2016 in Indio, California were part of the Coachella Valley Music and Arts Festival.)	Indio	United States	Empire Polo Club	N/A	—	—
April 23, 2016	Indio	United States	Empire Polo Club	N/A	—	—
May 5, 2016	Tokyo	Japan	Duo Music Exchange	—	—	—
May 6, 2016	Osaka	Japan	Umeda Akaso	—	—	—
May 14, 2016 (Note: The show on May 14, 2016 in Columbia was part of the Sweetlife Festival.)	Columbia	United States	Merriweather Post Pavilion	—	—	—
June 10, 2016 (Note: The show on June 10, 2016 in Manchester, Tennessee was part of the Bonnaroo Music Festival.)	Manchester	United States	Great Stage Park	—	—	—
June 18, 2016 (Note: The show on June 18, 2016 in Mansfield, Massachusetts was part of the Kiss Concert.)	Mansfield	United States	Xfinity Center	—	—	—
July 6, 2016	Orlando	United States	CFE Arena	Bad Suns	—	—
July 8, 2016	Houston	United States	Revention Music Center	Bad Suns	—	—
July 9, 2016	New Braunfels	United States	Whitewater Amphitheater	Bad Suns	—	—
July 10, 2016	Allen	United States	Allen Event Center	Bad Suns	—	—
July 12, 2016	Phoenix	United States	Comerica Theatre	Bad Suns	—	—
July 14, 2016	Los Angeles	United States	Shrine Exposition Hall	Bad Suns	—	—
July 15, 2016	Los Angeles	United States	Shrine Exposition Hall	Bad Suns	—	—
July 16, 2016	San Diego	United States	CalCoast Open Air Amphitheatre	Bea Miller	—	—
July 21, 2016	Morrison	United States	Red Rocks Amphitheatre	Oh Wonder	—	—
July 22, 2016	Kansas City	United States	Midland Theatre	Oh Wonder	—	—
July 26, 2016	Milwaukee	United States	Eagles Ballroom	Oh Wonder	—	—
July 27, 2016	Detroit	United States	Masonic Temple Theatre	Oh Wonder	—	—
July 29, 2016	Indianapolis	United States	White River State Park	Oh Wonder	—	—
July 31, 2016 (Note: The show on July 31, 2016 in Chicago, Illinois was part of Lollapalooza.)	Chicago	United States	Grant Park	—	—	—
August 2, 2016	Cleveland	United States	Jacobs Pavilion	Oh Wonder	—	—
August 3, 2016	Toronto	Canada	RBC Echo Beach	Oh Wonder	—	—
August 4, 2016	Uncasville	United States	Mohegan Sun Arena	Oh Wonder	6,120 / 6,120	$183,600
August 6, 2016 (Note: The show on August 6, 2016 in San Francisco, California was part of the Outside Lands Music and Arts Festival.)	San Francisco	United States	Golden Gate Park	—	—	—
August 9, 2016	Pittsburgh	United States	Stage AE	Oh Wonder	—	—
August 11, 2016	Philadelphia	United States	Festival Pier at Penn's Landing	Oh Wonder	—	—
August 12, 2016	Boston	United States	Agganis Arena	Oh Wonder	—	—
August 13, 2016	New York City	United States	Madison Square Garden	Oh Wonder	12,776 / 12,776	$501,282
August 20, 2016 (Note: The concert on August 20, 2016 in Chelmsford, England at Hylands Park is part of the V Festival.)	Chelmsford	England	Hylands Park	—	—	—
August 21, 2016 (Note: The concert on August 21, 2016 in Weston-under-Lizard, England at Weston Park is part of the V Festival.)	Weston-under-Lizard	England	Weston Park	—	—	—
September 3, 2016 (Note: The concert on August 3, 2016 in Edmonton, Alberta, Canada is part of the Sonic Boom Festival.)	Edmonton	Canada	Borden Park	—	—	—
September 4, 2016 (Note: The show on September 4, 2016 in Calgary, Alberta was part of the X Fest Calgary.)	Calgary	Canada	Fort Calgary	—	—	—
September 18, 2016 (Note: The concert on September 18, 2016 at the Marina Bay Street Circuit in Singapore is part of the 2016 Formula 1 Singapore Airlines Singapore Grand Prix.)	Singapore		Marina Bay Street Circuit	—	—	—
Total					46,994 / 46,994 (100%)	$1,295,622

=== Cancelled shows ===
List of cancelled concerts, showing date, city, country, venue, and reason for cancellation
Date	City	Country	Venue	Reason
July 30, 2016	Chicago	United States	Aragon Ballroom	Production constraints
