= Bad at Love =

Single by Halsey

from the album Hopeless Fountain Kingdom
- Released: August 22, 2017
- Recorded: 2016
- Genre: Pop; R&B
- Length: 3:01
- Label: Astralwerks
- Songwriters: Ashley Frangipane; Eric Frederic; Justin Tranter; Rogét Chahayed
- Producers: Ricky Reed; Rogét Chahayed

Halsey singles chronology
"Now or Never" (2017)	"Bad at Love" (2017)	"Him & I" (2017)

Music video
- "Bad at Love" on YouTube

"Bad at Love" is a song by American singer Halsey from her second studio album, Hopeless Fountain Kingdom (2017). It was released on August 22, 2017, through Astralwerks as the second single from the album. Halsey co-wrote the song with Justin Tranter, Ricky Reed, and Rogét Chahayed, with the song being produced by the latter two. Lyrically, the song encompasses the protagonist's past relationships and the reasons they were unsuccessful.

"Bad at Love" debuted at number 81 on the Billboard Hot 100 and later peaked at number five, making it Halsey's first top-five entry on the chart as a lead artist. It also reached number one on the Dance Club Songs chart in the US, and at number two on the Mainstream Top 40 chart in the country. On August 27, 2026, "Bad at Love" was certified Diamond in the U.S. after selling 10 million units.

"Bad at Love" earned Halsey two award nominations: one at the Teen Choice Awards, and one at the iHeartRadio Much Music Video Awards. Between 2017 and 2018, she performed the song live on Ellen, Saturday Night Live, Good Morning America. On the original setlist of her Hopeless Fountain Kingdom Tour, it was listed at number 11, and on the changed setlist, it was an encore.

== Background and composition ==
"Bad at Love"
A 17-second sample from the chorus of "Bad at Love" by Halsey.

Halsey told Billboard that the tune should "sound like Leonardo DiCaprio in a Hawaiian T-shirt in a droptop yellow convertible car – driving down the highway like in Miami Vice with all his friends."

"Bad at Love" is a mid-tempo pop and R&B ballad, which lasts for three minutes and one second. According to musicnotes.com, the song is written in the key of C major. On the track, Halsey goes through a list of her different lovers and what went wrong in their relationship. With each one, she thought they were "the one" and could "fix her", but it went wrong for various reasons. From her history of dating, she concludes that she is "bad at love". Her list of lovers include both men and women indicating at her bisexuality, which is a running theme throughout the album. When a music reviewer pointed out that Halsey "doesn't do anything wrong" in any of the relationships she describes in the song, she responded saying it's about her choice of poor partners, plus the "self deprecating" and "facetious" mood of the song, and her bad love. She also stated it's about being naive. She also stated it's a "sad" song.

== Music video ==
The music video was directed by Halsey with Sing J Lee. It begins on a desert road, with the singer having a short hairstyle and taking off on a motorcycle. She stops at a gas station, where she picks up a newspaper with her face and "Wanted" written on the first page. With the help of three friends, she avoids capture by two futuristic cops. Afterward, they ride into the sunset as the video ends. The video was uploaded on August 30, 2017, on her Vevo channel.

== Commercial performance ==
As of September 2017, the song has sold 76,645 copies in the United States according to Nielsen SoundScan. It peaked at number five on the Billboard Hot 100 chart, becoming her first top five entry as a lead artist and surpassing the chart position of Halsey's previous single "Now or Never", which reached number 17. It would be her highest-charting solo song until almost a year later when "Without Me" reached number one.

Aided by official mixes from Dillon Francis, Hook N Sling, Klangkarussell, Autograf, and Generik, "Bad at Love" gave Halsey her first number one on the Dance Club Songs chart in its December 16, 2017, issue and her second number one (as well as her first as a solo artist) on the accompanying Dance/Mix Show Airplay chart in its January 3, 2018, issue.

== Live performances ==
In 2017, Halsey performed "Bad at Love" at the iHeartRadio summer festival, the iHeartRadio Music Festival, and the Ellen show. In 2018, she performed the song on Saturday Night Live, Good Morning America, and at the 2018 iHeartRadio MMVAs.

== Track listing ==
- Digital EP – "Bad at Love (Remixes)"
1. "Bad at Love" (Dillon Francis Remix) – 3:20
2. "Bad at Love" (Hook N Sling Remix) – 2:51
3. "Bad at Love" (Klangkarussell Remix) – 3:50
4. "Bad at Love" (Autograf Remix) – 3:21
5. "Bad at Love" (Generik Remix) – 2:46

== Charts ==
=== Weekly charts ===
Chart (2017–2018)	Peak position
Australia (ARIA)	42
Australia Dance (ARIA)	5
Canada Hot 100 (Billboard)	22
Colombia (National-Report)	94
Czech Republic Singles Digital (ČNS IFPI)	48
Latvia (DigiTop100)	54
Netherlands (Single Tip)	8
New Zealand Heatseekers (RMNZ)	7
Portugal (AFP)	72
Slovakia Airplay (ČNS IFPI)	69
Slovakia Singles Digital (ČNS IFPI)	41
US Billboard Hot 100	5
US Adult Contemporary (Billboard)	20
US Adult Pop Airplay (Billboard)	3
US Dance Club Songs (Billboard)	1
US Dance Airplay (Billboard)	1
US Pop Airplay (Billboard)	2
US Radio Songs (Billboard)	3
US Rhythmic Airplay (Billboard)	17
Venezuela English (Record Report)	5

=== Year-end charts ===
Chart (2018)	Position
Canada (Canadian Hot 100)	69
US Billboard Hot 100	27
US Adult Top 40 (Billboard)	19
US Dance Club Songs (Billboard)	50
US Dance/Mix Show Airplay (Billboard)	12
US Mainstream Top 40 (Billboard)	16
US Radio Songs (Billboard)	17
Venezuela English (Record Report)	3

== Certifications ==
Region	Certification	Certified units/sales
Australia (ARIA)	Platinum	70,000^{‡}
Brazil (Pro-Música Brasil)	2× Platinum	120,000^{‡}
Canada (Music Canada)	3× Platinum	240,000^{‡}
Denmark (IFPI Danmark)	Gold	45,000^{‡}
New Zealand (RMNZ)	3× Platinum	90,000^{‡}
Poland (ZPAV)	Gold	62,500^{‡}
United Kingdom (BPI)	Platinum	600,000^{‡}
United States (RIAA)	Diamond	10,000,000^{‡}
Streaming
Sweden (GLF)	Gold	4,000,000^{†}
^{‡} Sales+streaming figures based on certification alone.^{†} Streaming-only figures based on certification alone.

== Release history ==
Region	Date	Format	Label	Ref.
Various	June 2, 2017	Digital download; streaming	Capitol; Astralwerks	
United States	August 22, 2017	Contemporary hit radio	Capitol; Astralwerks	
United States	October 9, 2017	Hot adult contemporary radio	Capitol; Astralwerks	
