= Eyes Closed (Halsey song) =

Song by Halsey

Promotional single by Halsey

from the album Hopeless Fountain Kingdom
- Released: May 4, 2017
- Genre: Electro
- Length: 3:22
- Label: Astralwerks
- Songwriters: Ashley Frangipane; Abel Tesfaye; Benjamin Levin; Nathan Perez; Magnus Høiberg
- Producers: Benny Blanco; Cashmere Cat; Happy Perez

Audio video
- "Eyes Closed" on YouTube

"Eyes Closed" is a song by American singer Halsey. It was released on May 4, 2017, through Astralwerks as the first promotional single from her second studio album, Hopeless Fountain Kingdom (2017).

== Background ==
Halsey announced on March 7, 2017, the release month and title of her second studio album Hopeless Fountain Kingdom, set for release in June. About the album's sound, she opted for a more mainstream-oriented sound, saying: "I am more than capable of writing radio music and hopefully I'll put my money where my mouth is on this album." The song was premiered on May 4, 2017, on Apple Music's Beats 1 along an interview with host Zane Lowe and director Baz Luhrmann, being later released on digital retailers and streaming platforms.

== Composition ==
The track was written by Halsey and the Weeknd and the song's producers Benny Blanco, Cashmere Cat and Happy Perez. It has been described as dark and sinister-sounding synth-y electro. The song is written in C-sharp minor with a tempo of 65 beats per minute.

== Critical reception ==
Da'Shan Smith of Billboard described the song as a "pop flavoring with an upbeat instrumental that falls in line with electro-soft rock" and "a more cinematic, ballad". PopCrush staff writers calls "Eyes Closed", "moody, chill-inducing".

== Charts ==
Chart (2017)	Peak position
Australia (ARIA)	62
Canada Hot 100 (Billboard)	73
France (SNEP)	171
New Zealand Heatseekers (RMNZ)	5
Scottish Singles Sales (Official Charts)	48
US Bubbling Under Hot 100 (Billboard)	1

== Certifications ==
Region	Certification	Certified units/sales
United States (RIAA)	Platinum	1,000,000^{‡}
^{‡} Sales+streaming figures based on certification alone.

== Rosé version ==
"Eyes Closed"

Song by Rosé
- Released: 10 February 2019
- Genre: Electro
- Length: 2:27
- Label: Songs Music Publishing LLC
- Songwriters: Happy Perez; Halsey; Cashmere Cat; Benny Blanco; The Weeknd

Audio video
- "Eyes Closed" on YouTube

Korean-New Zealand singer Rosé of South Korean girl group Blackpink released a cover of "Eyes Closed" on February 10, 2019.

=== Background and release ===
For her solo stage in the Blackpink Arena Tour 2018, Rosé performed a cover of "Eyes Closed" alongside a cover of Taeyang's "Eyes, Nose, Lips". On February 10, 2019, she released the studio version of the cover on YouTube and SoundCloud, as a surprise gift to her fans on her birthday. In an Instagram post, she stated, "Thank you for all the lovely birthday messages! I'm always so spoiled by all of you and I'm so grateful to every single one of you. So here's me giving a tiny little something back in return. This is the studio version of my cover for [Halsey]'s 'Eyes closed'. I sang this at our Japan concert last year but this song has been one of my favourites for a very long time. So I'm super excited that I am able to give this to you on my birthday."

=== Composition ===
"Eyes Closed" was written by Happy Perez, Halsey, Cashmere Cat, Benny Blanco, and the Weeknd, with vocals by Rosé. Rosé stated that the song is one of her long-time favorites and "at the time when I recorded it, I was needing some of the healing that this song brings to me."

=== Reception ===
Halsey complimented Rosé's take on the track and since then has returned the favor by interacting with her group several times on social media, including sharing a video on Twitter of her rocking out to the Blackpink song "Ddu-Du Ddu-Du" during a glam session. Since its release, Rosé's cover of "Eyes Closed" has surpassed 35 million views on YouTube and 2.5 million plays on SoundCloud.
