= Strangers (Halsey song) =

2017 song by Halsey featuring Lauren Jauregui

Promotional single by Halsey featuring Lauren Jauregui

from the album Hopeless Fountain Kingdom
- Released: May 26, 2017
- Genre: Synth-pop
- Length: 3:41
- Label: Astralwerks
- Songwriters: Ashley Frangipane; Greg Kurstin
- Producer: Greg Kurstin

Music video
- "Strangers" on YouTube

"Strangers" is a song by American singer Halsey featuring fellow American singer Lauren Jauregui. It was released on May 26, 2017, through Astralwerks as the second promotional single from her second studio album, Hopeless Fountain Kingdom (2017). The song received critical acclaim. Halsey later released a music video on June 20, 2018.

== Background ==
The album's track listing was revealed on April 29, 2017, on Halsey's Instagram account, where it was first known that Halsey would collaborate with Fifth Harmony's Lauren Jauregui on a song called "Strangers". In April, during several radio interviews that Halsey attended to promote the album, she further commented about the song:

I was thinking to myself, if I want this song to be believable, it needs to be real, so I'm not going to put a girl on the song to sing who's straight. I'm just not going to do it. So I reached out to Lauren and she came in and she cut the vocal and it sounds awesome. Our voices sound really cool together because we both have really raspy voices, mine's a little more delicate than hers. Hers is like really powerful and big and raspy, and mine is kind of like light and raspy. But it's really cool because I'm bisexual. I just love that Lauren and I are two women who have a mainstream pop presence doing a love song for the LGBT community, it's unheard of. It's very rare to see it from a female perspective.

== Composition ==
"Strangers" incorporates a 1980s-inspired production, with echoed synthesizers and strong drumline Analyzing its lyrical content Alexia Shouneya from Billboard wrote, "Strangers is about two women longing for one another," while Christina Lee of Idolator opined, "The lyrics actually tell a straightforward story about a dissolved relationship, and the loneliness that quickly follows."

== Critical reception ==
"Strangers" received critical acclaim. AllMusic's journalist Stephen Thomas Erlewine noted that "same-sex love songs remain a rarity in the pop music of the 2010s, and ... that's a sly reveal of how Halsey represents a generational shift". In her review for Billboard, Alexia Shouneya noted "in the first verse alone, she uses the female pronoun four times, once in every line, making it impossible to miss, skim over or interpret as anything other than what it was meant to be: a strong, unapologetic acknowledgement of lesbian and bisexual women." Anna Caga of Spin believed that "Strangers" is the "best Halsey['s] song" and described it as "slinky and addicting", adding that its best moments are "Jauregui's ad-libs, the way she slurs the word 'innocent' with the kind of spontaneous passion Halsey never allows herself." In Pitchfork, Katherine St. Asaph said the song "shimmers and yearns like a recent Tegan and Sara cut" and "contains the album's most nuanced lyrics, the coupling that's most promising yet most out of reach."

Billboard ranked "Strangers" at number 97 on its critics list of the 100 Best Songs of 2017. Chris Payne wrote that it is Billboard staff's favorite song from the album, praising Halsey and Jauregui's chemistry and Jauregui's tone and delivery of "lovesick desperation". Billboard regarded the song as a "long-overdue bisexual milestone in mainstream music." In 2019, Billboard included the song in its list of the "30 Lesbian Love Songs".

== Live performances ==
Halsey and Jauregui performed "Strangers" on Today on June 9, 2017. The following day, the two performed the song at iHeartSummer '17 Weekend in Miami Beach, Florida. In June 2018, they performed the song on Good Morning America. On June 17, 2025, Lauren and Halsey reunited in Chicago, Illinois to perform together as part of For My Last Trick: The Tour.

== Credits and personnel ==
Credits adapted from the liner notes of Hopeless Fountain Kingdom.

- Halsey – vocals
- Julian Burg – recording
- Chris Gehringer – mastering
- Serban Ghenea – mixing
- John Hanes – engineering for mix
- Lauren Jauregui – vocals
- Ezra Kurstin – voices
- Greg Kurstin – drum programming, drums, guitar, keyboards, production, recording
- Alex Pasco – recording

== Charts ==
Chart (2017–18)	Peak position
Australia (ARIA)	93
Czech Republic Airplay (ČNS IFPI)	18
France (SNEP)	137
New Zealand Heatseekers (RMNZ)	3
Philippines (Philippine Hot 100)	90
Portugal (AFP)	57
Scottish Singles Sales (Official Charts)	45
Slovakia Singles Digital (ČNS IFPI)	89
US Billboard Hot 100	100

== Certifications ==
Region	Certification	Certified units/sales
Brazil (Pro-Música Brasil)	Platinum	60,000^{‡}
United States (RIAA)	Gold	500,000^{‡}
^{‡} Sales+streaming figures based on certification alone.
