= Now or Never (Halsey song) =

Single by Halsey

from the album Hopeless Fountain Kingdom
- Released: April 4, 2017
- Recorded: 2016
- Genre: Dark pop; R&B
- Length: 3:34
- Label: Astralwerks
- Songwriters: Ashley Frangipane; Brittany Hazzard; Magnus Høiberg; Benjamin Levin; Nathan Perez
- Producers: Benny Blanco; Cashmere Cat; Happy Perez

Halsey singles chronology
"Not Afraid Anymore" (2017)	"Now or Never" (2017)	"Bad at Love" (2017)

Music video
- "Now or Never" on YouTube

"Now or Never" is a song by American singer Halsey from her second studio album Hopeless Fountain Kingdom (2017). It was released on April 4, 2017, through Astralwerks as the lead single with its music video being released simultaneously, as an instant grat with the album's pre-order. Halsey co-wrote the song with Starrah and its producers Cashmere Cat, Happy Perez, and Benny Blanco. It is a dark pop song that also incorporates R&B.

Commercially, "Now or Never" reached the top twenty of Australia, Malaysia, and the US. It was certified 2× Platinum in the US.

== Background ==
Halsey announced on March 7, 2017, the release month and title of her second studio album Hopeless Fountain Kingdom, set for release in June. She opted for a more mainstream-oriented sound for the album, saying: "I am more than capable of writing radio music and hopefully I'll put my money where my mouth is on this album." The single was announced alongside the reveal of the cover through Halsey's social media accounts a day before its official release.

== Composition ==
"Now or Never"
A 29-second sample of Halsey singing through the first verse into the chorus.

"Now or Never" was written by Halsey and Starrah alongside producers Cashmere Cat, Happy Perez and Benny Blanco. This later also served as her "therapist in a weird way" during the recording process. She stated: "We'd finish the track and then be ready to go, and he'd (Blanco) be like, 'Hey, I heard that thing you sang. Are you OK?'. It was kind of like he was hearing a cry for help in what I was singing, which was cool because it made us bond." The song has been described as a pop, dark pop, and R&B slow jam. Lyrically, it sees Halsey offering a lover an ultimatum to love her "now or never".

The song is composed in a key of F-sharp minor.

== Critical reception ==
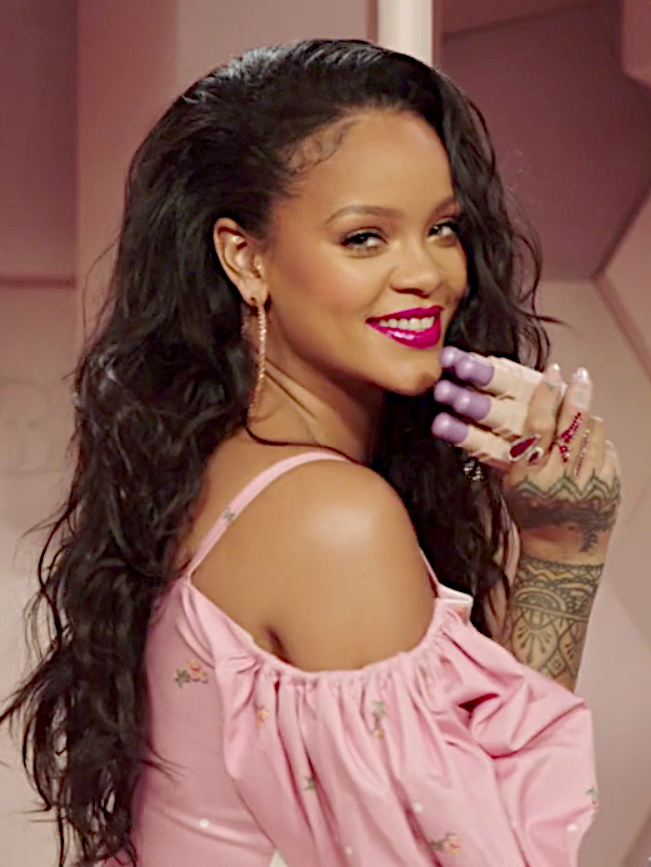
"Now or Never" was compared to the Rihanna song "Needed Me".

“Now or Never” was met with mixed reviews from music critics. In the context of following her successful pop collaboration with the Chainsmokers, "Closer", Jon Caramanica in The New York Times opined "Now or Never" is "worrisome; it's among her least vocally present songs (with a couple of blatant Rihanna-isms to boot), and moves at a slow, neutered creep. And it's deeply effective, even if it's not deeply Halsey." Billboard editor Jason Lipshutz wrote that the song "doesn't have the massive chorus of "Closer"—its hook, widely compared to Rihanna's "Needed Me," simmers and never detonates—but the song possesses the type of slow tempo and vulnerable vocal delivery that has worked for recent hits like Julia Michaels' "Issues" and Khalid's "Location." Brittany Spanos of Rolling Stone thought Halsey "embraces a more sensual sound," moving away from the "industrial-leaning alternative pop" of her debut album Badlands. Anna Caga of Spin wrote that it "sounds like someone left a can of Rihanna's 'Needed Me' on the counter until it went flat."

== Commercial performance ==
"Now or Never" entered the US Billboard Hot 100 at number 50 on the chart dated April 29, 2017, marking Halsey's fifth chart entry. It entered the top forty at number 38 in its fourth week. It peaked at number 17 on the issue dated July 29, becoming her highest-peaking song as a lead artist up to that point. It charted for a total of 20 weeks, and was eventually certified quadruple Platinum by the Recording Industry Association of America. The track enjoyed success on various airplay charts in the US. On the Pop Airplay chart, it peaked at number three, whilst reaching numbers 12 and 15 on the Adult Pop Airplay and Rhythmic Airplay charts respectively. Dance remixes of the song also allowed it to reach a peak of number five on the Dance Airplay tally.

== Music video ==
The music video was directed by Halsey with Sing J Lee, marking the singer's directorial debut. It was shot in Mexico City. Inspired by Baz Luhrmann's 1996 film Romeo + Juliet, the video is filled with gun violence. Halsey talked about the video's plot in a statement, saying: "[It] is one part in the centre of a long narrative that tells the story of two people in love despite the forces trying to keep them apart. On its own, the song is about two impatient young lovers, but in the context of the Hopeless Fountain Kingdom universe, the stakes are much higher for these two star-crossed lovers".

Kristof Brandl, the video's cinematographer, was an MTV Video Music Award nominee for Best Cinematography at the 2017 MTV Video Music Awards.

== Live performances ==
Halsey performed "Now or Never" live on The Tonight Show Starring Jimmy Fallon on May 4, 2017. Later that month she also performed the song live at the 2017 Billboard Music Awards.

In June 2017, she performed "Now or Never" live on The Late Show with Stephen Colbert.

== Track listings ==
- Digital download
1. "Now or Never" – 3:34
- Digital download – R3hab Remix
1. "Now or Never" (R3hab Remix) – 3:04

== Charts ==
=== Weekly charts ===
Chart (2017)	Peak position
Australia (ARIA)	16
Austria (Ö3 Austria Top 40)	61
Belgium (Ultratip Bubbling Under Flanders)	24
Canada Hot 100 (Billboard)	32
Czech Republic Singles Digital (ČNS IFPI)	30
France (SNEP)	151
Germany (GfK)	98
Ireland (IRMA)	42
Italy (FIMI)	55
Malaysia (RIM)	20
Netherlands (Single Top 100)	84
New Zealand (Recorded Music NZ)	22
Philippines (Philippine Hot 100)	64
Portugal (AFP)	35
Scottish Singles Sales (Official Charts)	46
Slovakia Singles Digital (ČNS IFPI)	31
Sweden (Sverigetopplistan)	61
Switzerland (Schweizer Hitparade)	77
UK Singles (Official Charts)	80
US Billboard Hot 100	17
US Adult Pop Airplay (Billboard)	12
US Dance Club Songs (Billboard)	18
US Dance Airplay (Billboard)	5
US Pop Airplay (Billboard)	3
US Rhythmic Airplay (Billboard)	15
Venezuela English (Record Report)	25

=== Year-end charts ===
Chart (2017)	Position
Australia (ARIA)	75
Canada (Canadian Hot 100)	88
US Billboard Hot 100	59
US Adult Top 40 (Billboard)	50
US Dance/Mix Show Airplay (Billboard)	26
US Mainstream Top 40 (Billboard)	23

== Certifications ==
Region	Certification	Certified units/sales
Australia (ARIA)	2× Platinum	140,000^{‡}
Brazil (Pro-Música Brasil)	Platinum	60,000^{‡}
Canada (Music Canada)	Platinum	80,000^{‡}
Denmark (IFPI Danmark)	Gold	45,000^{‡}
Italy (FIMI)	Gold	25,000^{‡}
Mexico (AMPROFON)	Gold	30,000^{‡}
New Zealand (RMNZ)	2× Platinum	60,000^{‡}
Norway (IFPI Norway)	Gold	30,000^{‡}
United Kingdom (BPI)	Silver	200,000^{‡}
United States (RIAA)	4× Platinum	4,000,000^{‡}
Streaming
Sweden (GLF)	Gold	4,000,000^{†}
^{‡} Sales+streaming figures based on certification alone.^{†} Streaming-only figures based on certification alone.

== Release history ==
Region	Date	Format	Version	Label	Ref.
Various	April 4, 2017	Digital download; streaming	Original	Capitol; Astralwerks	
Various	July 7, 2017	Digital download; streaming	R3hab Remix	Capitol; Astralwerks	
