= The Huntsman: Winter's War (soundtrack) =

2016 film soundtrack album

The Huntsman: Winter's War (Original Motion Picture Soundtrack)

Film score by James Newton Howard
- Released: April 22, 2016
- Recorded: 2015–2016
- Studios: AIR Studios, London
- Genre: Film score
- Length: 74:15
- Label: Back Lot Music
- Producers: James Newton Howard; Jim Weidman (co-producer); Sven Faulconer (co-producer)

James Newton Howard chronology
Concussion (2015)	The Huntsman: Winter's War (2016)	Fantastic Beasts and Where to Find Them (2016)

Singles from The Huntsman: Winter's War (Original Motion Picture Soundtrack)
- 1. "Castle" Released: April 9, 2016

The Huntsman: Winter's War (Original Motion Picture Soundtrack) is the film score to the 2016 film The Huntsman: Winter's War directed by Cedric Nicolas-Troyan which is the prequel and sequel to Snow White & the Huntsman (2012).

== Development and release ==
The original score is composed by James Newton Howard returning from the predecessor. The film features a song titled "Castle" performed by Halsey, which was a re-recorded version of her original song from the studio album Badlands (2015). Subtitled as "The Huntsman: Winter's War Version", the song was released as a single on April 9, 2016. The soundtrack featuring Howard's score and Halsey's song was released through Back Lot Music, on April 22, coinciding with the film's release.

== Reception ==
Filmtracks wrote "The Huntsman: Winter's War is a weak four-star score, slightly stronger than Snow White and the Huntsman, which was a strong three-star effort. There are dull moments of the sequel score that need trimmed from the album (the "Lacrimosa" religious choral cue also stands apart stylistically), but the new love theme and the incorporation of Ravenna's material make this entry more consistently enjoyable. More importantly, film music fans can take the pretty highlights of the first score and combine them with the love theme and a few action portions of this one to yield a very solid four-star experience overall between the two."

James Southall of Movie Wave wrote "On the whole it’s certainly an enjoyable ride and this is one of those film scores where you’re left wondering what might have been if the composer had found as much inspiration from the whole film as he evidently did from certain parts of it, but James Newton Howard is a classy film composer when he’s writing this kind of music and so even if it’s not near the top of the range by his standards, it’s still worth hearing." Ben of Soundtrack Universe wrote "Despite accompanying what by all accounts is a wretched sequel to a decent film, Howard returns with a surprisingly solid score that intelligently incorporates the prior works themes while delving into a more refined and romantically lush soundscape. Despite some minor issues with certain moments sounding very similar to other Howard compositions, Winter's War remains another highlight for the fantasy genre as scored by James Hewton Howard."

Leslie Felperin of The Hollywood Reporter and Christy Lemire of RogerEbert.com called the score "emotional" and "orchestral". Fionnuala Halligan of Screen International called it a "swollen score". Georgia Davis of The Post wrote "The composer, James Newton Howard, compensates for the lousy dialogue with his beautifully written score. Where the dialogue and acting fails to produce emotion, the score makes up for it by creating tension and capturing what emotions are supposed to be conveyed."

== Track listing ==
All music is composed by James Newton Howard (tracks 1–21).

The Huntsman: Winter's War (Original Motion Picture Soundtrack)
No.	Title	Writer(s)	Performer(s)	Length
1.	"The Huntsman"			3:48
2.	"Lacrimosa"			0:53
3.	"You're Carrying His Child"			2:17
4.	"The Children Arrive"			5:03
5.	"You Shouldn't Walk in Shadows"			3:23
6.	"Freya's Spell"			5:22
7.	"Freya Prepares for War"			1:51
8.	"Tavern Brawl"			2:08
9.	"That's Not What Happened"			3:35
10.	"Where's My Horse?"			1:47
11.	"The Proposition"			2:10
12.	"The Goblin Forest"			3:45
13.	"Goblin King"			2:05
14.	"The Goblin Fight"			3:15
15.	"We Are Worth for Each Other"			1:52
16.	"Have You Been True?"			2:33
17.	"Kill Him"			4:24
18.	"Ravenna Returns"			4:13
19.	"This Is My Kingdom"			3:42
20.	"Stand or Fall Together"			8:22
21.	"Ravenna's Embrace"			3:27
22.	"Castle"	Ashley Frangipane; Peder Losnegård	Halsey	4:20
Total length:				1:14:15

== Personnel credits ==
Credits adapted from liner notes:

- Music composer and producer – James Newton Howard
- Co-producer – Jim Weidman, Sven Faulconer
- Musical arrangement – Sven Faulconer
- Programming – Sven Faulconer, Christopher Wray
- Engineer – Alex Ferguson, John Prestage
- Score recordist – Adam Miller
- Recording – Shawn Murphy
- Mix recordist – Erik Swanson
- Mixing – Shawn Murphy, Johnny Traunwieser
- Mastering – Dave Collins
- Score editor – David Channing
- Supervising music editor – Jim Weidman
- Music editor – David Olson
- Auricle control systems – Chris Cozens, Richard Grant
- Technical score advisor – Victor Chaga
- Scoring coordinator – Pamela Sollie
- Copyist – Joann Kane Music Service
- Music librarian – Mark Graham
- Package design – Brian Porizek
- Music business and legal affairs for Universal Pictures – Kyle Staggs, Tanya Perara
- Executive in charge of music for Universal Pictures – Mike Knobloch
- Marketing manager for Back Lot Music – Nikki Walsh
- Production director for Back Lot Music – Jake Voulgarides
- Music supervision for Universal Pictures – Rachel Levy

London Symphony Orchestra

- Orchestrators – Jeff Atmajian, Jon Kull, Pete Anthony, Peter Boyer, Philip Klein
- Orchestra conductor – Pete Anthony
- Orchestra contractor – Isobel Griffiths
- Assistant orchestra contractor – Susie Gillis
- Orchestra leader – Thomas Bowes
- Bass – Allen Walley, Andy Pask, Hugh Sparrow, Mary Scully, Paul Kimber, Richard Pryce, Steve Mair, Steve Williams
- Bassoon, contrabassoon – Gavin McNaughton, Richard Skinner
- Cello – Adrian Bradbury, Bozidar Vukotic, Chris Worsey, Dave Lale, Frank Schaefer, Jacky Thomas, Joely Koos, Jonathan Tunnell, Jonathan Williams, Katherine Jenkinson, Nick Cooper, Paul Kegg, Sophie Harris
- Clarinet, bass clarinet – David Fuest, Nick Rodwell
- Flute – Anna Noakes, Karen Jones, Samuel Coles
- Harp – Skaila Kanga
- Horn – Caroline O'Connell, David Pyatt, Mike Thompson, Nigel Black, Phillip Easton, Richard Berry, Richard Watkins
- Oboe, cor anglais – David Thomas, Jane Marshall, John Anderson, Rosie Jenkins
- Percussion – Frank Ricotti, Gary Kettel, Paul Clarvis, Bill Lockhart
- Piano, celeste – Simon Chamberlain
- Solo cello – Josephine Knight
- Trombone – Andy Wood, Dave Stewart, Mark Nightingale, Richard Edwards
- Trumpet – Alistair Mackie, Dan Newell, Jason Evans, Philip Cobb
- Tuba – Owen Slade
- Viola – Andy Parker, Bill Hawkes, Helen Kamminga, Jon Thorne, Julia Knight, Kate Musker, Martin Humbey, Paul Cassidy, Rachel Bolt, Rachel Robson, Rebecca Carrington, Becky Low, Richard Cookson, Steve Tees, Sue Dench, Vicci Wardman
- Violin – Bea Lovejoy, Boguslaw Kostecki, Cathy Thompson, Christina Emanuel, Clare Thompson, Clio Gould, Corinne Chappelle, Debbie Preece, Debbie Widdup, Dorina Markoff, Emlyn Singleton, Fenella Barton, Gaby Lester, Helen Patterson, Jackie Hartley, John Bradbury, Jonathan Evans-Jones, Kathy Gowers, Lorraine McAslan, Magnus Johnston, Mark Berrow, Martin Burgess, Oli Langford, Patrick Kiernan, Perry Montague-Mason, Philippa Ibbotson, Philippe Honoré, Rita Manning, Sonia Slany, Sue Briscoe, Thomas Bowes, Tom Kemp

London Voices

- Choir conductor – Pete Anthony
- Choirmasters – Ben Parry, Terry Edwards
- Alto – Alexandra Gibson, Amy Lyddon, Catherine Backhouse, Clara Sanabras, Deryn Edwards, Eleanor Minney, Jo Marshall, Judy Rees, Melanie Sanders, Tamsin Dalley
- Bass – Alistair Bamford, Ben Bevan, Christian Goursaud, Edward Grint, Edward Randell, Gavin Horsley, James Holliday, Jeremy Birchall, John Evanson, Jonathan Wood, Lawrence White, Mark Williams, Michael Dore, Neil Bellingham, Nicholas Ashby, Nicholas Garrett, Oliver Hunt, Peter Snipp, Russell Matthews, Simon Grant, Simon Preece, Stefan Berkieta
- Soprano – Amy Wood, Ann de Renais, Grace Davidson, Joanna Forbes (tracks: Joanna Forbes L'Estrange), Joanna Goldsmith, Katie Trethewey, Natalie Clifton Griffith, Nicki Kennedy, Rosalind Waters, Sara Brimer, Sarah Eyden
- Tenor – Andrew Walters, Benedict Hymas, Benedict Quirke, Daniel Joy, Garth Bardsley, Harvey Brough, Henry Moss, John Bowen, Julian Alexander Smith, Michael Sol Williams, Nicholas Smith, Nicholas Keay, Nicholas Pritchard, Norbert Meyn, Oliver Griffiths, Richard Eteson, Ronan Busfield, Simon Haynes, Tom Edward Robson
- Solo vocals – Grace Davidson

Trinity Boys' Choir

- Choirmaster – David Swinson
- Performers – Alex Wong, Amiri Harewood, Ben Hill, Buster Dickinson, Charles Davies, Daniel Williams, Hugo Barry-Casademunt, Jamie Coskun, Jeremie de Rijk, Joel Okolo-Hunter, Joshua Kenney, Krishan Shah, Lucas Pinto, Matthew Gilbert, Nicholas Challier, Roman Southcombe, Sebastian Exall, William Davies, William Hardy, Xavier Lally
- Solo vocals – Ben Hill

== Accolades ==
Award	Category	Recipients	Result	Ref.
Teen Choice Awards	Choice Music: Song from a Movie or TV Show	"Castle" by Halsey	Nominated	
