= Fantastic Beasts and Where to Find Them =

Fantastic Beasts and Where to Find Them may refer to:

- Fantastic Beasts and Where to Find Them (book), a 2001 book by J. K. Rowling
- Fantastic Beasts and Where to Find Them (film), a 2016 film by David Yates
  - Fantastic Beasts and Where to Find Them (soundtrack), a 2016 soundtrack album by James Newton Howard

== See also ==
- Fantastic Beasts (disambiguation)
