= Resident Evil (film series) =

Film series based on video games

- Film series logo (2002–2016)
- Directed by: Paul W. S. Anderson (1, 4–6); Alexander Witt (2); Russell Mulcahy (3); Johannes Roberts (7); Zach Cregger (8)
- Written by: Paul W. S. Anderson (1–6); Johannes Roberts (7); Zach Cregger (8); Shay Hatten (8)
- Based on: Resident Evil by Capcom
- Produced by: Paul W. S. Anderson (1–6); Jeremy Bolt (1–6); Bernd Eichinger (1, 3); Samuel Hadida (1–6); Don Carmody (1–6); Robert Kulzer; James Harris (7); Hartley Gorestein (7); Zach Cregger (8); Roy Lee (8); Miri Yoon (8); Victor Hadida (8); Asad Qizilbash (8); Carter Swan (8)
- Music by: Marco Beltrami (1); Marilyn Manson (1); Jeff Danna (2); Charlie Clouser (3); Tomandandy (4–5); Paul Haslinger (6); Mark Korven (7); Ryan Holladay (8); Hays Holladay (8)
- Production companies: Screen Gems (1–7); Columbia Pictures (8); Constantin Film; Davis Films; Impact Pictures (1–6); The Fyzz Facility (7); The Tea Shop and Film Company (7); PlayStation Productions (8); Vertigo Entertainment (8)
- Distributed by: Sony Pictures Releasing
- Language: English
- Budget: $388 million (all 8 films)
- Box office: $1.680 billion (all 8 films)

Resident Evil is a biopunk horror film series mainly produced by the German production company Constantin Film, co-produced and distributed by Sony Pictures, and based on the Japanese video game franchise by Capcom. The series includes live-action films based on the franchise, but not animated films.

Constantin Film bought the rights to adapt the series to live action in January 1997. In 2000, Paul W. S. Anderson was announced as writer and director for Resident Evil (2002). Anderson continued as writer and producer for Resident Evil: Apocalypse (2004) and Resident Evil: Extinction (2007), and returned as the director for Resident Evil: Afterlife (2010), Resident Evil: Retribution (2012) and Resident Evil: The Final Chapter (2016). These first six films follow Alice (Milla Jovovich), a character created for the films. Alice is a covert operative who battles the Umbrella Corporation, whose bioweapons have triggered a zombie apocalypse. Characters from the games appear, including Claire Redfield, Jill Valentine, Ada Wong, Carlos Oliveira, Chris Redfield, Leon S. Kennedy, Barry Burton, and the antagonists Albert Wesker and James Marcus.

The series was rebooted with Resident Evil: Welcome to Raccoon City (2021), directed by Johannes Roberts. It was a commercial and critical failure. A second reboot, Resident Evil, directed by Zach Cregger, was released in 2026 to widespread critical acclaim and became the highest grossing Resident Evil film.

Though most of the films have received generally negative reviews from critics, the Resident Evil series has grossed over $1.6 billion. It was once the highest-grossing film series based on a video game and the highest-grossing horror film series, and is the highest-grossing zombie film series. The series retains the record for the most live-action film adaptations of a video game.

== Films ==
Resident Evil films
Film	U.S. release date	Directed by	Screenplay by	Produced by
Original series
Resident Evil	March 15, 2002	Paul W. S. Anderson	Paul W. S. Anderson	Paul W. S. Anderson, Jeremy Bolt, Samuel Hadida & Bernd Eichinger
Resident Evil: Apocalypse	September 10, 2004	Alexander Witt	Paul W. S. Anderson	Paul W. S. Anderson, Jeremy Bolt & Don Carmody
Resident Evil: Extinction	September 21, 2007	Russell Mulcahy	Paul W. S. Anderson	Paul W. S. Anderson, Jeremy Bolt, Robert Kulzer, Bernd Eichinger & Samuel Hadida
Resident Evil: Afterlife	September 10, 2010	Paul W. S. Anderson	Paul W. S. Anderson	Paul W. S. Anderson, Jeremy Bolt, Robert Kulzer, Don Carmody & Samuel Hadida
Resident Evil: Retribution	September 14, 2012	Paul W. S. Anderson	Paul W. S. Anderson	Paul W. S. Anderson, Jeremy Bolt, Robert Kulzer, Don Carmody & Samuel Hadida
Resident Evil: The Final Chapter	January 27, 2017	Paul W. S. Anderson	Paul W. S. Anderson	Paul W. S. Anderson, Jeremy Bolt, Robert Kulzer & Samuel Hadida
First reboot
Resident Evil: Welcome to Raccoon City	November 24, 2021	Johannes Roberts	Johannes Roberts	James Harris, Hartley Gorenstein & Robert Kulzer
Second reboot
Resident Evil	September 18, 2026	Zach Cregger	Shay Hatten & Zach Cregger	Robert Kulzer, Zach Cregger, Roy Lee, Miri Yoon, Victor Hadida, Asad Qizilbash & Carter Swan

=== Original series ===
==== Resident Evil (2002) ====
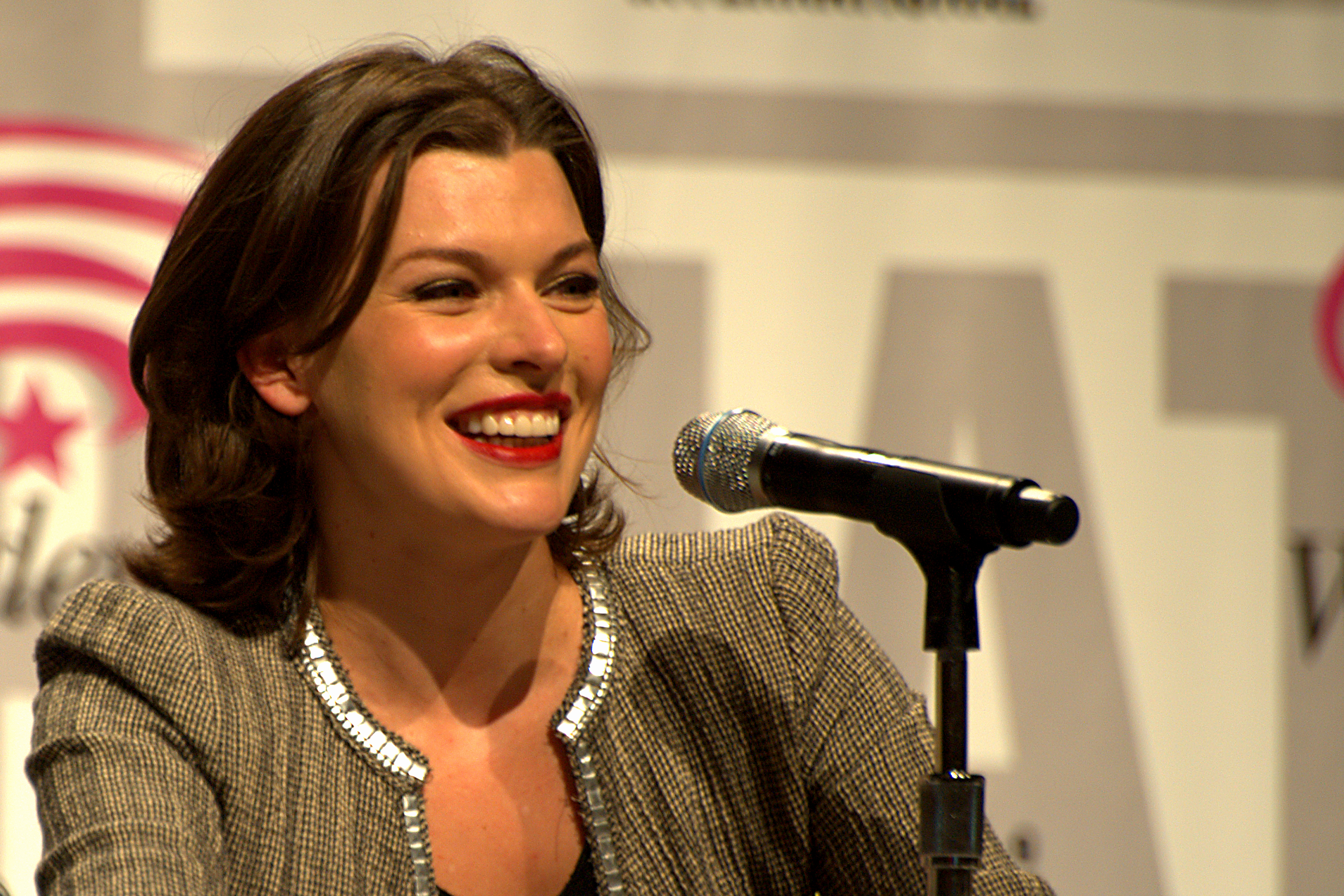
Milla Jovovich portrayed Alice in the original six films.

Countries in which the original Resident Evil film series was filmed

In January 1997, Constantin Film acquired the live-action film rights to the Resident Evil franchise with Alan B. McElroy possibly writing the script. George A. Romero was hired by Sony Pictures and Capcom to direct and write Resident Evil. His script was later rejected and he was ultimately dropped. While Romero's script was supported by a number of people from Capcom and Constantin, it was rejected by Constantin producer Bernd Eichinger, as well as Capcom producer Yoshiki Okamoto. A documentary based on this adaptation was released on digital on January 7, 2025. In late 2000, Paul W. S. Anderson was announced as director and writer. Anderson stated the film would not include any tie-ins with the video game series as "under-performing movie tie-ins are too common and Resident Evil, of all games, deserved a good celluloid representation". In 2001, Milla Jovovich was cast as Alice, an original character who serves as the main protagonist of the film. By May 2001, Columbia TriStar was in final negotiations to acquire North American distribution rights to the film and budgeted it at $40 million.

In the film, the Umbrella Corporation operates a secret genetic research facility named the Hive. Located beneath Raccoon City, the Hive has been sealed by its AI, the Red Queen, after the release of the T-virus into the facility. The Red Queen kills everyone in the facility to ensure that the T-virus does not reach the surface, but the T-virus reanimates them, transforming the humans and animals into aggressive zombies and mutants. Alice was once a security operative working for the corporation until her memory was wiped by the Red Queen's nerve gas. As her team investigates the Hive, a monstrous Umbrella test subject called a Licker pursues them onto a train. Alice survives along with teammate Matt Addison, but they are separated and taken by an Umbrella hazmat unit, where Matt begins to genetically transform. Alice awakens from a coma to a ravaged Raccoon City after a T-virus outbreak.

==== Resident Evil: Apocalypse (2004) ====
A sequel began production in 2003 after the success of the first film. Anderson returned as the writer but, due to his work on Alien vs. Predator, Alexander Witt took over the director's role. The film released on September 10, 2004.

In the film, the viral outbreak reaches the surface and to contain the infection, Major Timothy Cain seals all exits to and from Raccoon City. Among the people trapped in the city are Jill Valentine and her partner Peyton Wells. After Alice awakens from her coma, she rescues Jill and Peyton from a group of Licker monsters. They are contacted by Dr. Charles Ashford, who directs them to an evacuation point in exchange for the rescue of his daughter Angela, trapped elsewhere in the city. Weapon Nemesis attacks the team after Cain commands it to kill all STARS (Special Tactics And Rescue Service) members. The team rescues Angela and makes its way to the evacuation helicopter guided by Umbrella mercenary Carlos Olivera. After Alice's confrontation with Cain and Nemesis leaves them dead, she and the team fly away from Raccoon City as it is destroyed by a nuclear missile. The helicopter crashes in the Arklay Mountains, and Alice is found by an Umbrella search team and taken to a research station. When Alice awakens, she displays extraordinary powers, and escapes with help from Jill and Carlos. As they drive away, Dr. Alexander Isaacs, a top-ranking Umbrella employee, reveals that Alice's escape is part of Umbrella's plan.

==== Resident Evil: Extinction (2007) ====
In November 2005, Screen Gems gained the rights for the third installment in the franchise, which was then subtitled Extinction. Anderson returned as a writer and filming took place in Mexico. Russell Mulcahy was the director. The film was released on September 21, 2007.

The world has been consumed by the T-virus and Umbrella Corporation develops clones of Alice to find one who displays her powers. Elsewhere, Claire Redfield leads a convoy of survivors across the Nevada desert, including Raccoon City survivors Carlos Olivera and L.J. Wayne. Alice roams the country alone, staying off the grid. After accidentally destroying her motorcycle, she joins Redfield's convoy, rescuing them from a mob of attacking crows using her telekinetic powers. Alice and the convoy head to Las Vegas to gather supplies so that they can reach Alaska to find "Arcadia", thought to be a safe haven. In Las Vegas, they are ambushed by a group of Umbrella Corporation's new super zombies created by Dr. Alexander Isaacs, which kills most of the convoy. L.J., who had been bitten earlier and hiding the progress of the infection, now completely transforms and bites Olivera. Dr. Isaacs himself is bitten and retreats to the Umbrella base where he injects himself with large doses of the anti-virus as a cure. He transforms into a Tyrant, a towering creature with regenerative and psionic powers. Alice, Claire and Carlos locate a helicopter in Umbrella base and plan to use it to extract the survivors to Alaska. Olivera makes his last stand by sacrificing himself and plowing his truck into a horde of zombies, giving the rest time to load the survivors. Claire and the survivors head towards Alaska, while Alice stays behind to confront Isaacs, and discovers her clones in the facility. After she defeats Isaacs, Alice contacts Umbrella and warns them that she is coming for them with an army of her clones.

==== Resident Evil: Afterlife (2010) ====
Before the third installment had been released, Constantin prepared to release a fourth entry. The film was set in Japan and filmed in 3D with the Fusion Camera System developed by James Cameron and Vince Pace for the 2009 film Avatar. It was written and directed by Paul W. S. Anderson and released on September 10, 2010.

After the events of Extinction, Alice and her clones attack the Umbrella Headquarters in Tokyo. Wesker escapes and destroys the facility, killing the clones. He is confronted by Alice aboard his helicopter, and injects her with a serum that removes her super-human abilities. The helicopter crashes, and only Alice is seen emerging from the rubble. After six months of a failed aerial search for other survivors, Alice heads toward the supposed location of Arcadia. She lands on an airfield in Alaska, and finds Claire with an Umbrella controlling device attached to her chest and a wiped memory. Claire and Alice fly to Los Angeles, where they stumble on a prison wherein they meet Luther West and Chris Redfield, Claire's brother. The survivors explain that Arcadia is really a tanker off the coast that has been broadcasting a looped message and is picking up survivors. During an attempted escape, Alice, Claire and Chris are the only ones to emerge and they reach the tanker only to find it abandoned. Claire's memory begins to return and she remembers Umbrella workers attacking her group of survivors and moving them to the tanker. They learn that the ship is an Umbrella research facility, which is conducting experiments on the survivors. The three meet Albert Wesker, who has been granted super-human abilities from the T-virus. After the fight, Alice transmits a message to survivors calling them to create a new and true safe haven. As the film closes, a fleet of Umbrella Corporation gunships led by Valentine prepares to lead an assault on the survivors.

==== Resident Evil: Retribution (2012) ====
Written and directed by Anderson, Retribution was planned to be filmed back to back with the sixth installment, but Anderson decided to focus on the fifth film. Filming took place in Toronto, Ontario from mid-October to December 23, 2011. Colin Salmon who played One and Michelle Rodriguez who played Rain Ocampo in the first film returned. Oded Fehr, who portrayed Carlos Olivera in the second and third films, also returned. Three characters from the video games made their debut in the film series—Johann Urb as Leon S. Kennedy, Kevin Durand as Barry Burton, and Li Bingbing as Ada Wong. It was released internationally on September 14, 2012.

Alice awakens in an Umbrella base where she is interrogated by Valentine. During a power failure orchestrated by Ada Wong, Alice escapes from her cell and encounters her. Wong explains that Wesker plans to aid Alice's escape and battle the base's supercomputer Red Queen, to save what's left of mankind. Wesker has organized a team of freelance operatives to infiltrate the base and help Alice and Ada escape, including Leon S. Kennedy, Barry Burton and Luther West. Along the way, Alice finds a clone of a girl named Becky. They also face clone versions of Carlos Olivera, One and Rain Ocampo, all under the direction of Valentine. After Alice meets with the rescue team, Valentine's soldiers catch up to them, resulting in a shootout that kills Burton, Olivera and One. Alice, West, Kennedy and Becky reach the surface and are met by a submarine, from which Valentine, the clone Rain, and a captured Ada emerge. Valentine battles Alice while Rain fights Kennedy and West. Alice manages to remove the scarab device from Valentine, returning her back to normal, and joins Kennedy in defeating Rain. Alice, Ada, Becky, Leon and Valentine travel to Wesker's base. Wesker injects Alice with the T-virus, returning her superhuman powers, then tells her that she is responsible for saving the remaining humans from extinction.

==== Resident Evil: The Final Chapter (2016) ====
Anderson wrote and directed the sixth and final film in the series, subtitled The Final Chapter, which was filmed in 2D and was post-converted to stereoscopic 3D. Milla Jovovich reprised her role as Alice, with only Shawn Roberts, Iain Glen and Ali Larter returning from previous entries as Albert Wesker, Dr. Isaacs and Claire Redfield, respectively. Continuing from the last film, Anderson expressed his desire for the final film to "come full circle", bringing back characters, themes and the environment of the Hive from the first movie. Filming was set to begin in South Africa in August 2014 but was delayed to the summer of 2015 due to Jovovich's pregnancy. Principal photography commenced on September 18, 2015, in South Africa. It was released on December 23, 2016, in Tokyo and on January 27, 2017, in North America.

Three weeks after the events in Retribution, humanity is on its last legs after Alice is betrayed by Wesker in Washington, D.C. Alice encounters the Red Queen, who tells her that she must return to Raccoon City, where the Umbrella Corporation has developed an airborne anti-virus which will kill every organism infected by the T-virus. In a race against time, Alice is captured by Dr. Isaacs, who reveals his previous incarnation was a clone. Alice escapes and arrives in Raccoon City, where she joins forces with Claire Redfield. After holding off Dr. Isaacs' undead army, Alice, Claire and a team of survivors make their way towards the Hive. They encounter the Red Queen, who tells them the T-virus was created by James Marcus, the founder of the Umbrella Corporation to save his daughter, Alicia, from an ailment that caused her to age rapidly. James was betrayed by his business partner, Dr. Isaacs, and killed by Albert Wesker. Dr. Isaacs and the board of the Umbrella Corporation then intended to release the T-virus to cleanse the world, save the rich and powerful with cryogenics in the Hive, and later rebuild it as they desire. After confronting Wesker and the real Dr. Isaacs at the bottom of the Hive, Alice learns she is a clone of the still-living Alicia Marcus. Alice releases the anti-virus, eliminating all infected by the T-virus. She survives, and gains the memories of Alicia Marcus as a reward to reclaim the childhood she never had. The series ends with Alice riding a motorcycle, stating that her job is not finished yet and that it will take several years for the anti-virus to circle the globe.

=== Reboot ===
==== Resident Evil: Welcome to Raccoon City (2021) ====
In May 2017, Constantin chairman Martin Moszkowicz stated that a reboot of the series was in development. In the same month, it was announced that James Wan would produce the reboot with a script by Greg Russo, with both later leaving the project. In December 2018, Johannes Roberts was hired as writer and director. Roberts stated that his film will be separate from the previous films in the series, with the story being based on Resident Evil and Resident Evil 2. By October 2020, the principal cast was reported with Kaya Scodelario cast as Claire Redfield, Hannah John-Kamen as Jill Valentine, Robbie Amell as Chris Redfield, Neal McDonough as William Birkin, Tom Hopper as Albert Wesker, and Avan Jogia as Leon S. Kennedy. Other cast members, Donal Logue, Chad Rook, Lily Gao and Marina Mazepa were cast as Chief Brian Irons, Richard Aiken, Ada Wong and Lisa Trevor, respectively. Filming began on October 17, 2020, in Sudbury, Ontario, Canada, with reshoots in May 2021. The film was released on November 24, 2021, by Sony Pictures Releasing in the United States.

Claire Redfield uncovers secrets about the Umbrella Corporation's experiments and accidents and travels back to her hometown of Raccoon City to warn her brother Chris Redfield. Meanwhile, a zombie outbreak begins after residents are poisoned in the water supply. Chris, along with fellow STARS members Jill Valentine and Albert Wesker, travel to the Spencer Mansion to recover bravo team and find out what is happening in the town. Claire travels with rookie police officer Leon S. Kennedy to the Raccoon City Orphanage to flee the city before it is destroyed, where they encounter a Licker and Claire's old friend Lisa Trevor. Wesker betrays Jill and attempts to steal the virus produced by Dr. William Birkin, a scientist working for the Umbrella Corporation. On the verge of death, Birkin injects himself with the G-virus, saving his life and mutating him into the Tyrant. The survivors flee on an underground train with Birkin's daughter Sherry and destroy the tyrant with a rocket launcher. In a mid-credits scene, Albert Wesker is saved from death by Ada Wong and is given his trademark sunglasses.

=== Second reboot ===
==== Resident Evil (2026) ====
In January 2025, it was reported that Zach Cregger was writing and directing a new film reboot, co-produced by Constantin Film and PlayStation Productions. In March 2025, Sony Pictures won a bidding war to secure the rights to the Resident Evil franchise, including its upcoming untitled project, with Columbia Pictures serving as the film's new distributor. Sony has set a release date of September 18, 2026 for the project. In June 2025, it was reported that the project had registered to film in the Czech Republic. On August 11, 2025, Austin Abrams was confirmed to star in the film. Filming was scheduled to begin in Prague in November 2025. Cregger stated that he had never seen any of the previous Resident Evil films and that the upcoming movie will be more closely based on the video game series, particularly Resident Evil 2, Resident Evil 3: Nemesis, and Resident Evil 4. On September 17, 2025 Paul Walter Hauser was cast in a role. The next month, Zach Cherry, Kali Reis and Johnno Wilson were cast in roles with Cherry as a scientist and Reis as an ex-military character that was originally written for a male actor.

== Cast and crew ==
=== Principal cast ===
List indicators
- This table shows the major characters that were featured in the films, sorted according to the actors' billing order, those adapted from the video games.
- A dark grey cell indicates that the character was not in the film.
- An ^{O} indicates an original character that was later adapted by the video games.
- A ^{Y} indicates a role as a younger version of the character.
- A ^{U} indicates an uncredited role.
- A ^{C} indicates a cameo role.
- A ^{V} indicates a voice-only role.
- An ^{A} indicates an appearance through archival footage or photo stills.

Character
Character	Resident Evil	Resident Evil: Apocalypse	Resident Evil: Extinction	Resident Evil: Afterlife	Resident Evil: Retribution	Resident Evil: The Final Chapter	Resident Evil: Welcome to Raccoon City	Resident Evil
Character	2002	2004	2007	2010	2012	2016	2021	2026
Characters introduced in Resident Evil video games
Dr. Alexander Isaacs / William Birkin (Note: Jason Isaacs, who appeared in most of Anderson's early films, was brought in for a day of filming, making a cameo appearance as a doctor near the end of the film, and he also provided the narration that opens it. In interviews, Anderson said Isaacs' character would be expanded on the sequel, to which Isaacs responded he would be happy to return for. When Isaacs did not return, Anderson created the character of Dr. Isaacs, played by Iain Glen, as a homage to the unnamed doctor that Jason Isaacs played originally.) / Tyrant	Jason Isaacs^{U}^{C}	Iain Glen	Iain Glen Brian Steele (Tyrant) Gary Hecker^{V} (Tyrant)		Iain Glen^{A}	Iain Glen	Neal McDonough	
Matthew "Matt" Addison / Nemesis	Eric Mabius	Matthew G. Taylor (Nemesis) Eric Mabius^{A}	Matthew G. Taylor (Nemesis)^{U}^{A}		Eric Mabius^{A} Matthew G. Taylor (Nemesis)^{U}^{A}	Eric Mabius^{A} Matthew G. Taylor (Nemesis)^{U}^{A}		
Carlos Olivera / Todd		Oded Fehr	Oded Fehr		Oded Fehr	Oded Fehr^{A}		
Jill Valentine		Sienna Guillory		Sienna Guillory^{C}	Sienna Guillory		Hannah John-Kamen	
Dr. Charles Ashford (Note: According to Anderson, the Ashford family and particularly Dr. Charles Ashford is "based on the game but with a slightly different role", indicating he based him on Resident Evil – Code: Veronica's Dr. Alexander Ashford.)		Jared Harris				Jared Harris^{A}		
Nicholai Ginovaef		Zack Ward						
Albert Wesker			Jason O'Mara	Shawn Roberts	Shawn Roberts	Shawn Roberts	Tom Hopper	
Claire Redfield			Ali Larter	Ali Larter	Ali Larter^{A}	Ali Larter	Kaya Scodelario Lauren Bill^{Y}	
Axemen (Note: Based on the "Executioner Majini" creature, from Resident Evil 5.)				Ray Olubowale	Ray Olubowale Kevin Shand	Ray Olubowale^{A}		
Chris Redfield				Wentworth Miller	Wentworth Miller^{A}		Robbie Amell Daxton Grey Gujral^{Y}	
Leon S. Kennedy					Johann Urb	Johann Urb^{A}	Avan Jogia	
Barry Burton					Kevin Durand	Kevin Durand^{A}		
Ada Wong					Li Bingbing Sally Cahill^{U}^{V}	Li Bingbing^{A}	Lily Gao^{C}	
Dr. James Marcus						Mark Simpson		
Chief Brian Irons							Donal Logue	
Richard Aiken							Chad Rook	
Brad Vickers							Nathan Dales	
Lisa Trevor							Marina Mazepa	
Annette Birkin							Janet Porter	
Sherry Birkin							Holly de Barros	
Ben Bertolucci							Josh Crudas	
Characters originating in Resident Evil films
Alicia Marcus / Alice	Milla Jovovich	Milla Jovovich	Milla Jovovich	Milla Jovovich	Milla Jovovich	Milla Jovovich Ever Anderson^{Y}		
Red Queen Angela "Angie" Ashford^{O}	Michaela Dicker	Sophie Vavasseur	Sophie Vavasseur^{U}^{A}		Megan Charpentier Ave Merson-O'Brian^{V} Sophie Vavasseur^{U}^{A}	Ever Anderson Michaela Dicker^{A}		
Rain Ocampo	Michelle Rodriguez	Michelle Rodriguez^{U}^{A}			Michelle Rodriguez	Michelle Rodriguez^{A}		
James "One" Shade	Colin Salmon		Colin Salmon^{U}^{A}		Colin Salmon^{C}	Colin Salmon^{A}		
Spence Parks	James Purefoy	James Purefoy^{U}^{A}	James Purefoy^{U}^{A}		James Purefoy^{A}	James Purefoy^{A}		
Dr. Blue	Joseph May				Joseph May^{A}	Joseph May^{A}		
Dr. Lisa Addison	Heike Makatsch	Heike Makatsch^{U}^{A}			Heike Makatsch^{A}	Heike Makatsch^{A}		
J.D. Salinas	Pasquale Aleardi	Pasquale Aleardi^{U}^{A}			Pasquale Aleardi^{A}	Pasquale Aleardi^{A}		
Olga Danilova	Liz May Brice		Liz May Brice^{U}^{A}		Liz May Brice^{A}	Liz May Brice^{A}		
Vance Drew	Torsten Jerabek		Torsten Jerabek^{U}^{A}		Torsten Jerabek^{U}^{A}	Torsten Jerabek^{A}		
Alfonso Warner	Marc Logan-Black		Marc Logan-Black^{U}^{A}		Marc Logan-Black^{U}^{A}	Marc Logan-Black^{A}		
Chad Kaplan	Martin Crewes				Martin Crewes^{A}	Martin Crewes^{A}		
Lloyd Jefferson "L.J." Wade		Mike Epps	Mike Epps		Mike Epps^{U}^{A}			
Major Timothy Cain		Thomas Kretschmann			Thomas Kretschmann^{A}			
Terri Morales		Sandrine Holt			Sandrine Holt^{A}			
Sgt. Peyton Wells		Razaaq Adoti			Razaaq Adoti^{A}			
Yuri Loganova		Stefen Hayes						
Mackenzie		Geoffrey Pounsett						
K-Mart			Spencer Locke	Spencer Locke^{C}	Spencer Locke^{A}			
Chase			Linden Ashby			Linden Ashby^{A}		
Betty			Ashanti					
Mikey			Christopher Egan					
Slater			Matthew Marsden					
Otto			Joe Hursley					
White Queen			Madeline Carroll					
Luther West				Boris Kodjoe	Boris Kodjoe	Boris Kodjoe^{A}		
J Pop Girl				Mika Nakashima^{C}	Mika Nakashima^{C}	Mika Nakashima^{A}		
Bennett Sinclair				Kim Coates	Kim Coates^{A}			
Kim Yong				Norman Yeung	Norman Yeung^{A}			
Angel Ortiz				Sergio Peris-Mencheta				
Crystal Waters				Kacey Clarke				
Wendell				Fulvio Cecere				
Becky					Aryana Engineer	Aryana Engineer^{A}		
Sergei					Robin Kasyanov			
Tony					Ofilio Portillo			
Abigail						Ruby Rose		
Doc						Eoin Macken		
Razor						Fraser James		
Cobalt						Rola		
Commander Chu						Lee Joon-gi		
Christian						William Levy		
Bryan Hodukavich								Austin Abrams
Carl								Zach Cherry
Maxine								Kali Reis
Paul								Paul Walter Hauser
Wilson								Johnno Wilson

=== Additional crew ===
Occupation
Occupation	Resident Evil	Resident Evil: Apocalypse	Resident Evil: Extinction	Resident Evil: Afterlife	Resident Evil: Retribution	Resident Evil: The Final Chapter	Resident Evil: Welcome to Raccoon City	Resident Evil
Occupation	2002	2004	2007	2010	2012	2016	2021	2026
Director	Paul W. S. Anderson	Alexander Witt	Russell Mulcahy	Paul W. S. Anderson	Paul W. S. Anderson	Paul W. S. Anderson	Johannes Roberts	Zach Cregger
Producers	Paul W. S. Anderson; Jeremy Bolt; Bernd Eichinger; Samuel Hadida	Paul W. S. Anderson; Jeremy Bolt; Don Carmody	Paul W. S. Anderson; Jeremy Bolt; Bernd Eichinger; Samuel Hadida; Robert Kulzer	Paul W. S. Anderson; Jeremy Bolt; Bernd Eichinger; Samuel Hadida; Robert Kulzer; Don Carmody	Paul W. S. Anderson; Jeremy Bolt; Samuel Hadida; Robert Kulzer; Don Carmody	Paul W. S. Anderson; Jeremy Bolt; Samuel Hadida; Robert Kulzer	Robert Kulzer; James Harris; Hartley Gorenstein	Robert Kulzer; Zach Cregger; Roy Lee; Miri Yoon; Victor Hadida; Asad Qizilbash; Carter Swan
Executive producer(s)	Victor Hadida; Robert Kulzer; Daniel S. Kletzky; Yoshiki Okamoto	Victor Hadida; Robert Kulzer; Bernd Eichinger; Samuel Hadida	Victor Hadida; Martin Moszkowicz; Kelly Van Horn	Victor Hadida; Martin Moszkowicz	Victor Hadida; Martin Moszkowicz	Victor Hadida; Martin Moszkowicz	Martin Moszkowicz; Victor Hadida; Jeremy Bolt; Paul W. S. Anderson	Oliver Berben; Richard Wright; Robert Bernacchi
Writer	Paul W. S. Anderson	Paul W. S. Anderson	Paul W. S. Anderson	Paul W. S. Anderson	Paul W. S. Anderson	Paul W. S. Anderson	Johannes Roberts	Zach Cregger; Shay Hatten
Composer(s)	Marco Beltrami; Marilyn Manson	Jeff Danna	Charlie Clouser	Tomandandy	Tomandandy	Paul Haslinger	Mark Korven	Ryan Holladay; Hays Holladay
Director(s) of photography	David Johnson	Derek Rogers; Christian Sebaldt	David Johnson	Glen MacPherson	Glen MacPherson	Glen MacPherson	Maxime Alexandre	Dariusz Wolski
Editor	Alexander Berner	Eddie Hamilton	Niven Howie	Niven Howie	Niven Howie	Doobie White	Dev Singh	Joe Murphy

== Reception ==
=== Box office performance ===
Film	Release date		Box office gross			All time box office ranking		Production budget	Ref
Film	United States	Other territories	North America	Other territories	Worldwide	North America	Worldwide	Production budget	Ref
Resident Evil	March 15, 2002	March 21, 2002	$40,119,709	$63,667,692	$103,787,401	2,189	1,602	$33 million	
Resident Evil: Apocalypse	September 10, 2004	September 11, 2004	$51,201,453	$78,141,316	$129,342,769	1,737	1,369	$45 million	
Resident Evil: Extinction	September 21, 2007	September 19, 2007	$50,648,679	$99,222,424	$149,871,103	1,742	1,177	$45 million	
Resident Evil: Afterlife	September 10, 2010	September 9, 2010	$60,128,566	$240,099,518	$300,228,084	1,415	513	$60 million	
Resident Evil: Retribution	September 14, 2012	September 12, 2012	$42,345,531	$198,302,098	$240,647,629	2,078	660	$65 million	
Resident Evil: The Final Chapter	January 27, 2017	December 23, 2016	$26,844,962	$287,256,498	$314,101,190	3,048	465	$40 million	
First reboot
Resident Evil: Welcome to Raccoon City	November 24, 2021	December 3, 2021	$16,937,037	$24,914,303	$41,851,340	4,076	2,874	$25 million	
Second reboot
Resident Evil	September 18, 2026	September 18, 2026	$158,016,996	$242,600,000	$400,616,996	TBA	TBA	$75 million	
Total			$446,242,933	$1,234,203,849	$1,680,446,512			$388 million	

Apocalypse, Extinction, Afterlife, Retribution and the 2026 film all opened at number one at the North American box office.

=== Critical and public response ===
Film	Rotten Tomatoes	Metacritic	CinemaScore
Resident Evil (2002)	36% (132 reviews)	35 (24 reviews)	B
Resident Evil: Apocalypse	18% (130 reviews)	35 (26 reviews)	B
Resident Evil: Extinction	24% (100 reviews)	41 (12 reviews)	B−
Resident Evil: Afterlife	21% (107 reviews)	37 (14 reviews)	B−
Resident Evil: Retribution	28% (74 reviews)	39 (17 reviews)	C+
Resident Evil: The Final Chapter	38% (102 reviews)	49 (19 reviews)	B
First reboot
Resident Evil: Welcome to Raccoon City	30% (92 reviews)	44 (21 reviews)	C+
Second reboot
Resident Evil (2026)	96% (304 reviews)	79 (51 reviews)	B+

The first six films, all written and produced by Anderson, received mixed or negative reviews from critics. However, they have gained a cult following among a distinct subset of reviewers. Calum Marsh of the National Post admired the Anderson-directed entries, saying: "The first is classical, close-quarters horror... Part four, Afterlife, is a riot of ludicrous action and superhero brawn... but it's a mere amuse bouche next to the five-star spread of part five, Retribution—a glorious, practically experimental sci-fi action wonder." Ignatiy Vishnevetsky of The A.V. Club called them "lean and lively and fun and totally unpretentious", and commended Anderson's style, "focused on organizing action and orientating the viewer".

== Home media ==
Sony Pictures Home Entertainment has released all seven films on DVD, Blu-ray, Ultra HD Blu-ray, and digital download. The original series of films were also released in box sets:

Title	Format	Release date	Films	Reference
Resident Evil / Resident Evil: Apocalypse – Resurrected Edition	DVD	September 4, 2007	Resident Evil (2002), Resident Evil: Apocalypse	
Resident Evil: The High Definition Trilogy	Blu-ray	January 1, 2008	Resident Evil (2002), Resident Evil: Apocalypse, Resident Evil: Extinction	
Resident Evil Trilogy	DVD	December 9, 2008	Resident Evil (2002), Resident Evil: Apocalypse, Resident Evil: Extinction	
The Resident Evil Collection	DVD, Blu-ray	September 4, 2012	Resident Evil (2002), Resident Evil: Apocalypse, Resident Evil: Extinction, Resident Evil: Afterlife	
The Resident Evil Collection	DVD, Blu-ray	December 21, 2012	Resident Evil (2002), Resident Evil: Apocalypse, Resident Evil: Extinction, Resident Evil: Afterlife, Resident Evil: Retribution	
Resident Evil: The Complete Collection	Blu-ray, Ultra HD Blu-ray	May 16, 2017	Resident Evil (2002), Resident Evil: Apocalypse, Resident Evil: Extinction, Resident Evil: Afterlife, Resident Evil: Retribution, Resident Evil: The Final Chapter	

== Novelizations ==
The novelizations for the first three Resident Evil films were written by Keith R. A. DeCandido. The novelization for the fifth film was written by John Shirley, and the sixth by Tim Waggoner. The fourth film did not receive a novelization.

The novel for the first film, titled Resident Evil: Genesis, was published over two years after that film's release, while the Extinction novel was released in late July 2007, two months before the film's release. There was also a Japanese novelization of the first film, unrelated to DeCandido's version, written by Osamu Makino. Makino also wrote two novels based on the game Resident Evil: The Umbrella Chronicles.

== See also ==
- List of highest-grossing horror films
- Resident Evil (video game series)
