= The Unholy (2021 film) =

2021 supernatural horror film by Evan Spiliotopoulos

- Theatrical release poster
- Directed by: Evan Spiliotopoulos
- Screenplay by: Evan Spiliotopoulos
- Based on: Shrine by James Herbert
- Produced by: Sam Raimi; Robert Tapert; Evan Spiliotopoulos
- Starring: Jeffrey Dean Morgan; Katie Aselton; William Sadler; Diogo Morgado; Cricket Brown; Cary Elwes
- Cinematography: Craig Wrobleski
- Edited by: Jake York
- Music by: Joseph Bishara
- Production companies: Screen Gems; Ghost House Pictures
- Distributed by: Sony Pictures Releasing
- Release date: April 2, 2021
- Running time: 99 minutes
- Country: United States
- Language: English
- Budget: $10 million
- Box office: $31 million

The Unholy is a 2021 American supernatural horror film written, produced, and directed by Evan Spiliotopoulos (in his directorial debut), based on the 1983 novel Shrine by James Herbert. Produced by Sam Raimi through his Ghost House Pictures banner, it stars Jeffrey Dean Morgan, Katie Aselton, William Sadler, Diogo Morgado, Cricket Brown, and Cary Elwes. The film follows on a disgraced journalist (Morgan) who discovers a series of seemingly divine miracles in a small New England town and uses them to resurrect his career, though those "miracles" may have a much darker source.

The project was announced in December 2018 under the working title Shrine, with Sony Pictures adapting Herbert's novel of the same name. The cast was announced between 2018 and 2020, with principal photography commencing in Boston, but on March 14, 2020, filming was suspended because of the COVID-19 pandemic.

The Unholy was theatrically released in the United States on April 2, 2021. Despite receiving negative reviews from critics, the film was considered a box office success, grossing $31 million worldwide against a budget of $10 million.

== Plot ==
In 1845, in Banfield, Massachusetts, Mary Elnor, a woman accused of witchcraft, is hanged from a tree and burned. After her death, her ashes are sealed inside a kern doll and bound with a chain, allowing her spirit to possess it.

In the present day, disgraced journalist Gerry Fenn, who was exposed for fabricating stories, earns a living reporting hoaxes. An assignment takes him to Boston, where he discovers that a reported supernatural disturbance is merely a teenage prank. Before leaving, he finds Mary's doll in the hollow base of the long-decayed tree and crushes it, unknowingly freeing her spirit. While driving away, he nearly hits Alice Pagett, a young girl who runs across the road. He follows her to the tree, hears her speak, and watches her collapse. After taking her to a church, he learns that Alice is deaf and mute. Believing he may have encountered a genuine supernatural phenomenon, Gerry stays to investigate.

The next day, Alice astonishes the community by speaking, claiming that the Virgin Mary has cured her. The ensuing media frenzy intensifies as other people experience apparent miraculous healings. During one such event, a statue of the Virgin near the chancel begins weeping blood. The Catholic Church dispatches Monsignor Delgarde to investigate, accompanied by Bishop Gyles. Alice tells Gerry that she has been communicating with an entity named Mary but merely assumed it was the Virgin. After experiencing visions of Mary as a monstrous creature, Gerry suspects a sinister explanation. He joins forces with Father William Hagan, Alice's maternal uncle, whom she has healed but who also questions the miracles.

Hagan discovers a book describing Mary Elnor, who performed miracles in the service of Satan. Before he can warn anyone, Elnor attacks him, and his body is found hanging in the church. Gyles persuades Gerry to conceal Hagan's apparent suicide to avoid undermining the reported miracles, and the death is officially ruled an accident.

Gerry befriends local physician Natalie Gates, and together they uncover the information Hagan found. Elnor had sold her soul to Satan in exchange for supernatural power. Satan enabled her and her descendants, including Alice, to perform apparent miracles that would persuade people to pledge themselves to her and, ultimately, to Satan. Gerry and Delgarde discover that Gyles knew about Elnor's history but had not connected it to the recent events. Gyles warns Gerry that his discredited reputation will prevent anyone from believing his accusations. When Elnor attempts to kill Gerry, Delgarde drives her away with prayer and a crucifix.

Unaware of Mary's true identity, Alice proposes holding a church service at a shrine built around the tree and broadcasting it to a mass audience. Delgarde warns that anyone pledging allegiance to Elnor will strengthen her power and condemn their soul to Hell. Gerry, Natalie, and Delgarde attempt a ritual in the church to stop the ceremony, but Elnor appears and crushes Delgarde with a burning cross.

During the service, officiated by Gyles, Alice urges the congregation to pledge themselves three times to "Mary of Banfield." Gerry intervenes, claiming that the miracles are fraudulent hoaxes of his own making and attributing the healings to the placebo effect. Meanwhile, Natalie uses sign language to urge Alice to stop the ceremony. Mary threatens Alice, promising that she will never speak again if she refuses to continue. Recognizing Mary's true nature, Alice declares that the miracles did not come from God.

The tree erupts in flames, sending the congregation fleeing as an enraged Mary emerges. She incinerates Gyles and attacks Gerry, but Alice sacrifices herself to save him. Because Alice is Mary's link to the living world, her death causes Mary to disintegrate into dust. Moved by Alice's sacrifice, Gerry begs God to restore her life. Alice returns to life but is deaf and mute once more, and everyone she healed reverts to their previous condition.

== Cast ==
- Jeffrey Dean Morgan as Gerald "Gerry" Fenn
- Cricket Brown as Alice Pagett
- William Sadler as Father William Hagan
- Katie Aselton as Natalie Gates
- Cary Elwes as Bishop Gyles
- Diogo Morgado as Monsignor Delgarde
- Bates Wilder as Geary
- Marina Mazepa as Mary Elnor
- Christine Adams as Monica Slade
- Gisela Chipe as Sofia Walsh
- Dustin Tucker as Dan Walsh
- Danny and Sonny Corbo as Toby Walsh
- Madison LaPlante as Faithful Teen Girl

== Production ==
On December 3, 2018, Deadline reported that Screen Gems and Sam Raimi would produce Shrine, a film adaptation of James Herbert's horror novel of the same name, with Evan Spiliotopoulos writing the script and making his directorial debut. On September 18, 2019, Jeffrey Dean Morgan was cast in the film. On November 12, 2019, Jordana Brewster joined the cast of the film. On February 27, 2020, Katie Aselton, William Sadler, Diogo Morgado, Cricket Brown, Marina Mazepa, Christine Adams, Bates Wilder and Cary Elwes joined the cast of the film, with Aselton replacing Brewster.

Principal photography commenced in Boston that same week, but on March 14, 2020, filming was suspended because of the COVID-19 pandemic. When filming resumed, due to CDC guidelines there could be no more than 10 background actors on set together at once, forcing Spiliotopoulos to use "the same people in five different places".

== Release ==
In March 2021, the film's new title was announced as The Unholy, along with a trailer and a scheduled release date of April 2, 2021. The film released digitally on May 25, 2021, and on Blu-ray, DVD and Ultra HD Blu-ray on June 22, 2021.

== Reception ==
=== Box office ===
The Unholy grossed $15.6 million in the United States and Canada and $15.4 million in other territories for a worldwide total of $31 million.

The Unholy grossed $1.2 million on its first day and a total of $3.2 million from 1,850 theaters its opening weekend, finishing second at the box office behind fellow newcomer Godzilla vs. Kong. The film dropped 23% to $2.4 million in its second weekend, then made $2 million in its third.

=== Critical response ===
Review aggregator Rotten Tomatoes reports that 27% of 60 critics gave the film a positive review and an average rating of 4.90/10. The website's critics consensus reads: "Rarely scary and often dull, The Unholy falls back on the same tired tropes that have already been done to death by countless other religious horror movies." Metacritic assigned a weighted average score of 36 out of 100 based on 15 critics, indicating "generally unfavorable reviews". Audiences polled by CinemaScore gave the film an average grade of "C+" on an A+ to F scale, while PostTrak reported 52% of audience members gave it a positive score, with 37% saying they would definitely recommend it.

Alonso Duralde of the TheWrap said that "you've seen this one before, countless times" and wrote: "Sam Raimi is a producer here, and it's hard not to think about how he might have mined this material both for provocation and for fright; his Drag Me to Hell remains the gold standard of how to scare the heck out of an audience within the restrictions of PG-13. What we get instead here is a tepid little chiller with an overqualified cast."

Movieguide, which reviews films from a Christian perspective, opined that The Unholy is a "well-made, captivating horror movie with a strong Christian worldview. It’s clear early on that the Christian characters recognize the tension between good and evil".

== See also ==
- Exorcism in Christianity
