= Conrad Buff IV =

American film editor (born 1948)

- Born: July 8, 1948 (age 78); Los Angeles, California, U.S.
- Occupation: Film editor
- Years active: 1969–present

Conrad Buff IV (born July 8, 1948) is an American film editor with more than 25 film credits since 1985. Buff is known for winning an Academy Award for Best Film Editing and an ACE Eddie Award for Best Edited Feature Film for Titanic (1997); the awards were shared with his co-editors James Cameron and Richard A. Harris. He also won the Satellite Award for Best Editing for Thirteen Days (2000).

== Life and career ==
Buff was born in Los Angeles, the son of architect Conrad Buff III, and the grandson of children's book creators Mary and Conrad Buff (painter Conrad Buff II). He attended Eagle Rock High School in Los Angeles and Pasadena City College for two years before joining the U. S. Navy. Buff learned film editing while working for the Navy's Motion Picture Office in Hollywood. In the first phase of his civilian career Buff was the "visual effects editor" on several successful films, ranging from The Empire Strikes Back (1980) through Ghostbusters (1984). Buff was an assistant editor on Return of the Jedi (1983); he worked with editor Sean Barton and director Richard Marquand. His first editing credit was as the co-editor with Barton for Jagged Edge (1985), which was also directed by Marquand.

Buff is noted particularly for his editing of four films directed by James Cameron, including Titanic. Buff edited The Abyss (1989) with Joel Goodman. Buff was nominated for an Oscar and an Eddie for the editing of Terminator 2: Judgment Day (1991 - with Mark Goldblatt and Richard A. Harris). He was again nominated for an Eddie for True Lies (1994) (also with Goldblatt and Harris). In addition to its actual awards, Titanic was nominated for the BAFTA Award for Best Editing.

Buff has edited four films with director Roger Donaldson: The Getaway (1994), Species (1995), Dante's Peak (1997; co-edited with Tina Hirsch and Howard Smith), and Thirteen Days (2000), which won the Satellite Award for Best Editing.

Since Thirteen Days, Buff has edited eight films directed by Antoine Fuqua: Training Day (2001), Tears of the Sun (2003), King Arthur (2004; with Jamie Pearson), Shooter (2007; with Eric Sears), The Equalizer 2 (2018), Infinite (2021), Emancipation (2022), and The Equalizer 3 (2023).

Buff has been elected to membership in the American Cinema Editors.

== Filmography ==
Filmography based on the Internet Movie Database.

Year	Title	Director	Notes
1970	Equinox	Jack Woods; Dennis Muren	
1978	Battlestar Galactica	Richard A. Colla; Alan J. Levi	
1980	The Empire Strikes Back	Irvin Kershner	
1981	Raiders of the Lost Ark	Steven Spielberg	
1982	E.T. the Extra-Terrestrial	Steven Spielberg	
1982	Poltergeist	Tobe Hooper	Visual effects editorial supervisor; Michael Kahn was main editor
1983	Return of the Jedi	Richard Marquand	
1984	Ghostbusters	Ivan Reitman	
1984	2010: The Year We Make Contact	Peter Hyams	
1985	Jagged Edge	Richard Marquand	
1986	Solarbabies	Alan Johnson	
1987	Spaceballs	Mel Brooks	
1988	Short Circuit 2	Kenneth Johnson	
1989	The Abyss	James Cameron	
1990	Side Out	Peter Israelson	
1991	Terminator 2: Judgment Day	James Cameron	Nominated — Academy Award for Best Film Editing; Nominated — ACE Eddie Award for Best Edited Feature Film – Dramatic
1991	The Last Boy Scout	Tony Scott	
1992	Jennifer 8	Bruce Robinson	
1994	The Getaway	Roger Donaldson	
1994	True Lies	James Cameron	Nominated — ACE Eddie Award for Best Edited Feature Film – Dramatic
1995	Species	Roger Donaldson	
1995	Virtuosity	Brett Leonard	
1997	Dante's Peak	Roger Donaldson	
1997	Switchback	Jeb Stuart	
1997	Titanic	James Cameron	Academy Award for Best Film Editing; ACE Eddie Award for Best Edited Feature Film – Dramatic; Online Film & Television Association Award for Best Editing; Satellite Award for Best Editing; Nominated — BAFTA Award for Best Editing
1999	Arlington Road	Mark Pellington	
1999	Mystery Men	Kinka Usher	
2000	Thirteen Days	Roger Donaldson	Satellite Award for Best Editing; Nominated — Las Vegas Film Critics Society Award for Best Editing
2001	Training Day	Antoine Fuqua	
2002	Antwone Fisher	Denzel Washington	
2003	Tears of the Sun	Antoine Fuqua	
2004	King Arthur	Antoine Fuqua	
2005	Harsh Times	David Ayer	
2005	Get Rich or Die Tryin'	Jim Sheridan	
2006	Seraphim Falls	David Von Ancken	
2007	Shooter	Antoine Fuqua	
2007	The Seeker	David L. Cunningham	
2008	The Happening	M. Night Shyamalan	
2009	Terminator Salvation	McG	
2010	The Last Airbender	M. Night Shyamalan	
2011	Rise of the Planet of the Apes	Rupert Wyatt	
2012	Snow White and the Huntsman	Rupert Sanders	
2016	The Huntsman: Winter's War	Cedric Nicolas-Troyan	
2016	Monster Trucks	Chris Wedge	
2017	American Assassin	Michael Cuesta	
2018	The Equalizer 2	Antoine Fuqua	
2021	Infinite	Antoine Fuqua	
2022	Emancipation	Antoine Fuqua	
2023	The Equalizer 3	Antoine Fuqua	
2026	Michael	Antoine Fuqua	
