= The Huntsman: Winter's War =

2016 film by Cedric Nicolas-Troyan

- Theatrical release poster
- Directed by: Cedric Nicolas-Troyan
- Written by: Evan Spiliotopoulos; Craig Mazin
- Based on: Characters created by Evan Daugherty
- Produced by: Joe Roth
- Starring: Chris Hemsworth; Charlize Theron; Emily Blunt; Nick Frost; Sam Claflin; Rob Brydon; Jessica Chastain
- Narrated by: Liam Neeson
- Cinematography: Phedon Papamichael
- Edited by: Conrad Buff
- Music by: James Newton Howard
- Production companies: Roth Films; Perfect World Pictures
- Distributed by: Universal Pictures
- Release dates: March 29, 2016 (Hamburg); April 22, 2016 (United States)
- Running time: 114 minutes 120 minutes (extended edition)
- Country: United States
- Language: English
- Budget: $115 million
- Box office: $165 million

The Huntsman: Winter's War is a 2016 American fantasy action-adventure romance film. Billed as both a prequel and sequel to Snow White & the Huntsman (2012), it marks the directorial debut of Cedric Nicolas-Troyan. (Note: He was a visual effects supervisor and second unit director on the first film.) It takes place before and after the events of the first film. The screenplay was written by Craig Mazin and Evan Spiliotopoulos and is based on characters created by Evan Daugherty. (Note: These, like the first film, were inspired by the fairy tale "Snow White" compiled by the Brothers Grimm, as well as "The Snow Queen" by Hans Christian Andersen.) Chris Hemsworth, Charlize Theron, Nick Frost and Sam Claflin reprised their roles from the first film, with Emily Blunt, Jessica Chastain and Rob Brydon joining.

The Huntsman: Winter's War premiered in Hamburg in March 2016, and was released in the United States on April 22, 2016, by Universal Pictures to negative reviews from critics and grossed $165 million worldwide against a $115 million production budget.

== Plot ==
After Queen Ravenna's Magic Mirror reveals that her sister, Princess Freya, is pregnant by her lover Andrew, tragedy strikes when Andrew kills their newborn daughter. In grief and rage, Freya's latent cryokinetic powers emerge, and she kills Andrew before fleeing to the northern mountains. There, she becomes the Snow Queen, ruling with fear and raising kidnapped children as an army of Huntsmen, forbidding them from ever falling in love.

Among them, Eric and Sara defy her rules and fall in love, planning to escape together. However, Freya discovers them and tricks them with illusions—making Sara believe Eric abandoned her and Eric believe Sara was killed.

Years later, after Ravenna's defeat, Queen Snow White falls ill due to the Mirror's dark magic. Fearing its power, she orders it taken to Sanctuary, but it is lost en route. Eric, joined by dwarves Nion and Gryff, sets out to recover it. Along the way, he is reunited with Sara, who survived but resents him for supposedly leaving her. They eventually uncover Freya's deception and rekindle their bond.

The group retrieves the Mirror from goblins but is ambushed by Freya. Sara appears to betray Eric, but her attack only fakes his death. Freya takes the Mirror and unknowingly resurrects Ravenna, whose spirit had fused with it. The two sisters plot to rule together, but Freya soon learns Ravenna orchestrated her daughter's death. Enraged, she turns against Ravenna but is mortally wounded. With her last strength, she helps Eric destroy the Mirror, killing Ravenna once and for all.

As Freya dies, she sees a vision of her daughter and finds peace. With her rule broken, her Huntsmen are freed, and Eric and Sara finally have a future together. In a post-credits scene, a fully recovered Snow White is seen on her balcony as a golden crow lands beside her.

== Cast ==
- Chris Hemsworth as Eric: An exceptional warrior and Freya's former Huntsman.
  - Conrad Khan as Young Eric
- Charlize Theron as Queen Ravenna: Snow White's evil stepmother.
- Emily Blunt as Queen Freya: Ravenna's younger sister.
- Jessica Chastain as Sara: Eric's wife who was thought to be dead by and through Freya's deceiving powers.
  - Niamh Walter as Young Sara
- Nick Frost as Nion: a Dwarf who previously helped Eric and Snow White defeat Ravenna's army.
- Sam Claflin as King William: the King of Tabor and Snow White's husband who helped her and Eric defeat Ravenna's army.
- Rob Brydon as Gryff: A debt-collecting Dwarf who is Nion's older half-brother.
- Sheridan Smith as Bromwyn: A feisty and greedy Dwarf who becomes allies with Nion and Gryff.
- Alexandra Roach as Doreena: A female Dwarf and Nion's love interest.
- Sope Dirisu as Tull: A fellow warrior raised by Freya.
- Sophie Cookson as Pippa: A fellow warrior raised by Freya.
  - Amelia Crouch as Young Pippa
- Sam Hazeldine as Liefr: A fellow warrior raised by Freya.
- Colin Morgan as Andrew: Freya's lover.
- Robert Portal as the unnamed King and husband of Ravenna and the ruler of an unnamed Kingdom.
- Fred Tatasciore as Mirror Man (voice): The physical form of the Magic Mirror.
- Madeleine Worrall as Eric's Mother
- Liam Neeson as Narrator
- Kristen Stewart as Snow White, the Queen of Tabor, William's wife and Ravenna's stepdaughter (uncredited; archive footage)
- Ruby and Scarlett Kick as Freya's Baby Daughter (uncredited)

== Production ==
=== Development ===
A sequel to Snow White & the Huntsman was initially planned with director Rupert Sanders in talks to return. The sequel plans were changed in August 2012 to a spin-off film concentrating on the Huntsman instead. Universal announced a few days later that they were not shelving the sequel. Another report stated that Universal authorised a sequel with Stewart set to reprise her role, but without Sanders to return as the director. A script was written and production was set to begin at some point in 2013, with the film to be released in 2015. On June 4, 2014, Deadline reported that Frank Darabont, Gavin O'Connor and Andrés Muschietti were on the shortlist to direct a sequel. On June 26, 2014, Deadline confirmed that Darabont was in talks to direct the sequel.

In 2014 it was announced that the film would be a prequel titled Huntsman and would not star Stewart as Snow White. Two years later, Stewart said that she voluntarily turned down an offer from the studio to provide a cameo in the film. On January 16, 2015, it was announced that Darabont had exited the film after he parted with Universal. Hemsworth and Theron were set to return for the film, while Emily Blunt was being circled for a new role. In 2015 it was confirmed that VFX specialist Cedric Nicolas-Troyan was set to direct the film, whose last draft was written by Darabont, following drafts by Craig Mazin and Evan Spiliotopoulos.

=== Casting ===
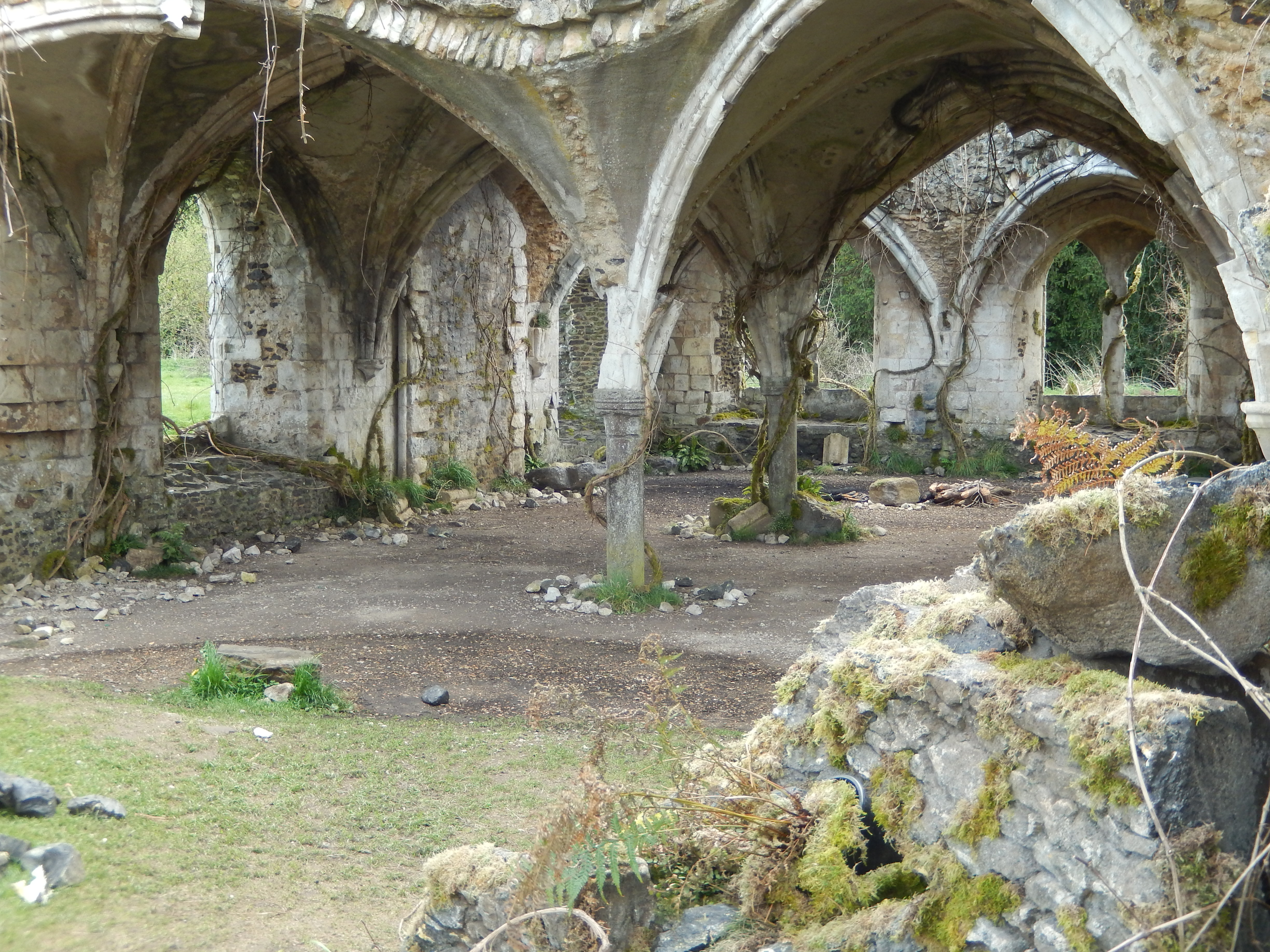
The refectory at Waverley Abbey with fake vines and rubble added for use as a film set for The Huntsman: Winter's War.

In 2015 Jessica Chastain was set to star in the film, Nick Frost was confirmed to reprise his previous role, while Blunt, who had been rumored to be interested, finally closed a deal to star as well. On March 18, 2015, it was revealed that Sheridan Smith, Rob Brydon and Alexandra Roach were added to the cast to play dwarves alongside Frost's character Nion. TheWrap confirmed on May 7, 2015, that Sam Claflin would return as William in the sequel.

=== Filming ===
Principal photography on the film began in April 2015. Filming took place at Waverley Abbey in Surrey, England in April 2015. Filming also occurred from May to July 2015 in Windsor Great Park, England, at locations including South Forest, Johnson's Pond and in the Deer Park near Snow Hill. Filming was also done in Wells Bishop's Palace and Wells Cathedral. In July 2015, filming also took place at Puzzlewood, in the Forest of Dean.

=== Music ===
In October 2015, it was officially announced, that James Newton Howard would return to score the film, after creating the music for Snow White & the Huntsman. The score album was released on April 22, 2016. Singer Halsey promoted the film by releasing an alternate version of her song "Castle", along with a subsequent music video, made for the film.

== Release ==
On July 31, 2014, Universal Pictures announced the film's release date would be April 22, 2016. In February 2016, it was announced that the film would be released in 3D in international markets like Germany. In Poland, the theatrical release was scheduled for April 8, 2016, which was the date for many other international markets.

=== Marketing ===
On November 16, 2015, Universal Pictures unveiled four character posters for the film, along with the film's new title, The Huntsman: Winter's War. Three days later, on November 18, 2015, the first official trailer of the film was released, along with two additional teaser posters. A second trailer debuted on February 11, 2016. Universal released a final trailer on March 22, 2016. Hemsworth, Theron and Chastain introduced a performance by Halsey of "Castle" at the 2016 MTV Movie Awards.

=== Home media ===
The Huntsman: Winter's War was released on Digital HD in August 2016 and was followed by a release on Blu-ray and DVD on August 23, 2016. The film debuted at No. 1 on the home video sales chart. A Blu-ray extended edition (with DVD & digital HD) was also released with a run time of 120 minutes.

== Reception ==
=== Box office ===
The Huntsman: Winter's War grossed $48.4 million in the United States and Canada, and $116.6 million in other territories, for a worldwide total of $165 million, against a production budget of $115 million. The Hollywood Reporter estimated the film lost the studio at least $75 million when factoring together all expenses and revenues.

==== North America ====
In the United States and Canada, early tracking suggested the film would open to $24–30 million, which was significantly lower than its predecessor's $56.2 million opening in 2012. The film opened in 3,791 theaters and grossed $7.3 million on its first day, including $1 million from its early Thursday night previews. In its opening weekend, it grossed a lower-than-expected $19.4 million, which was about 64% less than the original film's opening. Due to its underperforming opening weekend, the film lost Universal $30–40 million, with some estimates having the total losses at up to $70 million.

==== Outside North America ====
Internationally The Huntsman: Winter's War was released in a total of 65 countries. There were some estimates that the film would end its run at about $150 million internationally, which would have been lower than its predecessor's total of $240 million. One notable difference was that while Winter's War had secured a release date in China, Snow White & the Huntsman had not played there and analysts believed that could make "some difference". It was released in 18 countries two weeks ahead of its U.S. debut, earning $19.1 million from 3,969 screens and had No. 1 openings in eleven of them and second overall at the international box office charts, behind the superhero film Batman v Superman: Dawn of Justice. In its second weekend, it added 7 new markets and grossed a total of $17.8 million, falling only by 8% from its previews weekend and still remained at No. 2, behind The Jungle Book. It was still No. 2 in its third weekend. Its top openings occurred in China ($10.4 million), the United Kingdom and Ireland ($4.2 million), Brazil ($3.1 million), Mexico ($2.8 million), France ($2.6 million), Korea ($2.1 million), Russia ($2 million), the Philippines ($1.6 million), Malaysia ($1.6 million), Spain ($1.4 million) and Thailand ($1.2 million). In China, it was in third place, behind local pic Yesterday Once More and the continued run of The Jungle Book. It lost a large number of screens in its second weekend due to the arrival of three new local pics—Book of Love, Phantom of the Theater and MBA Partners—along with the continued run of The Jungle Book and as a result it grossed just $710,000.

In terms of total earnings, its largest markets outside of North America are China ($15.6 million), the UK ($7.3 million) and Mexico ($7.2 million).

=== Critical response ===
On the review aggregator website Rotten Tomatoes, 19% of 216 critics' reviews are positive, with an average rating of 4.3/10. The website's consensus reads: "The Huntsman: Winter's War is visually arresting and boasts a stellar cast, but neither are enough to recommend this entirely unnecessary sequel." On Metacritic, the film has a score of 35 out of 100, based on 41 critics, indicating "generally unfavourable reviews". Audiences polled by CinemaScore gave the film an average grade of "B+" on an A+ to F scale and PostTrak surveys give it a total positive score of 72%, but only a 49% audience recommendation.

=== Accolades ===
Award	Category	Recipients	Result	Ref.
Golden Trailer Awards	Best Action	"No Mercy"	Nominated	
Golden Trailer Awards	Best Fantasy Adventure	"Mirror Online"	Nominated	
Golden Trailer Awards	The Don LaFontaine Award for Best Voice Over	"Mirror Online"	Nominated	
Golden Trailer Awards	Best Motion/Title Graphics	"Mirror Online"	Nominated	
Jupiter Awards	Best International Actor	Chris Hemsworth	Nominated	
Teen Choice Awards	Choice Movie: Sci-Fi/Fantasy	The Huntsman: Winter's War	Nominated	
Teen Choice Awards	Choice Movie: Actor Sci-Fi/Fantasy	Chris Hemsworth	Nominated	
Teen Choice Awards	Choice Movie: Actress Sci-Fi/Fantasy	Charlize Theron	Nominated	
Teen Choice Awards	Choice Movie: Villain	Charlize Theron	Nominated	
Teen Choice Awards	Choice Movie: Liplock	Chris Hemsworth & Jessica Chastain	Nominated	
Teen Choice Awards	Choice Music: Song from a Movie or TV Show	"Castle" by Halsey	Nominated	

== See also ==
- List of films about witchcraft
