= Fantastic Beasts (disambiguation) =

Fantastic Beasts is a film series directed by David Yates, and a spin-off prequel to the Harry Potter novel and film series.

Fantastic Beasts may also refer to:

== Film ==
- Fantastic Beasts and Where to Find Them (film), a 2016 film directed by David Yates and written by J. K. Rowling
- Fantastic Beasts: The Crimes of Grindelwald, a 2018 film directed by David Yates and written by J. K. Rowling
- Fantastic Beasts: The Secrets of Dumbledore, a 2022 film directed by David Yates and written by J. K. Rowling and Steve Kloves

== Music ==
- Fantastic Beasts and Where to Find Them (soundtrack), a 2016 soundtrack album by James Newton Howard
- Fantastic Beasts: The Crimes of Grindelwald (soundtrack), a 2018 soundtrack album by James Newton Howard
- Fantastic Beasts: The Secrets of Dumbledore (soundtrack), a 2022 soundtrack album by James Newton Howard

== Other media ==
- Fantastic Beasts and Where to Find Them (book), a 2001 book written by J. K. Rowling
- Fantastic Beasts: Cases from the Wizarding World, a 2016 video game developed by Mediatonic and WB Games San Francisco, and published by Warner Bros. Interactive Entertainment
