= Evan Spiliotopoulos =

Greek-American filmmaker

- Born: Greece
- Occupations: Screenwriter, film producer, film director
- Years active: 1995–present
- Known for: The Jungle Book 2 Pooh's Heffalump Movie Hercules The Huntsman: Winter's War Beauty and the Beast

Evan Spiliotopoulos (Greek: Έβαν Σπηλιωτόπουλος) is a Greek-American screenwriter, film producer and film director.

== Early life ==
Spiliotopoulos was born in Greece, and graduated from high school there. Soon after, he moved to the United States and attended the University of Delaware to get an undergraduate degree in film theory. He then attended American University for a master's degree in screenwriting. After moving to Los Angeles in 1995, his first job in the industry was in a television film Trial by Fire as an intern.

== Career ==
In the 2000s, Spiliotopoulos wrote several animated projects for Walt Disney Pictures. He was attached to write a prequel of to the classic animated Snow White and the Seven Dwarfs film. However, the project was finally cancelled when Pixar was acquired by The Walt Disney Company in 2006.

In April 2009, Spiliotopoulos was set to write the screenplay for the action film Wanted 2, a sequel to the 2008 film Wanted.

In June 2013, Universal acquired the remake rights to the Japanese 2007 anime film Vexille and set Spiliotopoulos to write the screenplay.

In July 2014, Spiliotopoulos was hired by 20th Century Fox to write the script for the 2014 novel Seven Wonders written by Ben Mezrich. Spiliotopoulos had already rewritten the script of the horror film Ouija, but his draft wasn't used in the film.

In 2014, Spiliotopoulos re-wrote the screenplay for the action-adventure fantasy film Hercules, originally written by Ryan J. Condal. Brett Ratner directed the film which released on July 25, 2014, by Paramount Pictures.

Spiliotopoulos wrote the screenplay of the action-adventure fantasy film The Huntsman: Winter's War, along with Craig Mazin, and rewritten by Frank Darabont. Cedric Nicolas-Troyan directed the film, which was released on April 22, 2016, by Universal Pictures.

Spiliotopoulos and Stephen Chbosky wrote Disney's live-action musical romantic fantasy film Beauty and the Beast, which was directed by Bill Condon, and starring Emma Watson and Dan Stevens. The film was released on March 17, 2017.

Spiliotopoulos received a "story by" credit, with David Auburn, for the Charlie's Angels reboot film of 2019, which was written and directed by Elizabeth Banks.

In 2021, Spiliotopoulos' directorial debut, the horror film The Unholy was released.

== Writing credits ==
Theatrical release

Year	Title	Director	Notes
2003	The Jungle Book 2	Steve Trenbirth	Additional Screenplay Material
2004	Art Heist	Bryan Goeres	
2005	Pooh's Heffalump Movie	Frank Nissen	
2006	Khan Kluay	Kompin Kemgumnird	English-language version
2007	Battle for Terra	Aristomenis Tsirbas	
2014	Hercules	Brett Ratner	
2016	The Huntsman: Winter's War	Cedric Nicolas-Troyan	
2017	Beauty and the Beast	Bill Condon	
2019	Charlie's Angels	Elizabeth Banks	
2021	The Unholy	Himself	Also producer
2021	Snake Eyes	Robert Schwentke	
2023	The Pope's Exorcist	Julius Avery	

Direct-to-video

Year	Title	Director	Notes
2002	Bare Witness	Kelley Cauthen	
2004	The Lion King 1½	Bradley Raymond	Additional Screenplay Material
2004	Mickey, Donald, Goofy: The Three Musketeers	Donovan Cook	
2005	Tarzan II	Brian Smith	Additional Story Material
2005	Pooh's Heffalump Halloween Movie	Elliot M. Bour; Saul Andrew Blinkoff	
2007	Cinderella III: A Twist in Time	Frank Nissen	Additional Screenplay Material
2008	The Little Mermaid: Ariel's Beginning	Peggy Holmes	
2008	The Nutty Professor	Logan McPherson; Paul Taylor	
2009	Tinker Bell and the Lost Treasure	Klay Hall	

Television

Year	Title	Director	Notes
1998	Legion	Jon Hess	TV movie
1998	The Outsider	David Bishop	TV movie
2014	Mini Adventures of Winnie the Pooh	Frank Nissen	Episode "Roo and Lumpy"
