= Shrine (novel) =

1983 book by James Herbert

- First edition
- Author: James Herbert
- Language: English
- Genre: Horror novel
- Publisher: New English Library
- Publication date: 1983
- Publication place: United Kingdom
- Media type: paperback and hardback
- Pages: 433 pp (paperback)
- ISBN: 0-450-05659-7 (paperback)
- Preceded by: The Jonah
- Followed by: Domain

Shrine is a 1983 horror novel by English writer James Herbert, exploring themes of religious ecstasy, mass hysteria, demonic possession, faith healing and Catholicism.

== Plot ==
The story is about Alice Pagett, a deaf-mute child who is cured one night when she runs to an oak tree behind St. Joseph's, her local church. She is found by reporter Gerry Fenn and, when news of her cure spreads, their village becomes ablaze with publicity. After Alice performs several "miracle" cures in front of the tree, and claims to have seen the Virgin Mary there, it starts to be treated as a Lourdes-like shrine by Catholic pilgrims. St. Joseph's priest, Father Hagan, however, senses spiritual danger.

== Characters ==
- Alice Pagett, "miracle" healing child
- Molly Pagett, Alice's mother, a devout Catholic
- Len Pagett, Alice's father, an atheist
- Gerry Fenn, an ambitious journalist
- Father Hagan, troubled priest of St. Joseph's
- Monsignor Delgard, paranormal investigator for the Catholic church
- Bishop Caines, Hagan's superior
- Sue Gates, Gerry's lover and fellow journalist
- Nancy Shelbeck, American journalist

== Style ==
Each chapter begins with a quote from a famous literary work, often a fairy tale or poem dealing with folklore, like the Grimms' canon, Peter Pan, and Hans Christian Andersen. The third-person narrative switches between several points of view, including village businessmen, Catholic officials, and other minor, as well as important, characters.

== Film adaptation ==
On 3 December 2018, Deadline reported that Screen Gems and Sam Raimi will produce the adaptation of the novel with Evan Spiliotopoulos writing the script and making his directorial debut. On 18 September 2019, it was announced Jeffrey Dean Morgan will star in the film. On 12 November 2019, Jordana Brewster joined the cast of the film. On 27 February 2020, Katie Aselton, William Sadler, Diogo Morgado, Cricket Brown, Marina Mazepa, Christine Adams, Bates Wilder and Cary Elwes joined the cast of the film, with Aselton replacing Brewster, and principal photography commencing in Boston, but on 14 March 2020, filming was suspended because of the COVID-19 pandemic. In March 2021, the film's new title was announced as The Unholy, along with a scheduled release date of April 2, 2021.
