= 2016 MTV Movie Awards =

American awards show

- Date: Sunday, April 10, 2016
- Location: Warner Bros. Studios, Burbank, California
- Country: United States
- Hosted by: Kevin Hart and Dwayne Johnson

Highlights
- Most awards: Star Wars: The Force Awakens (3)
- Most nominations: Star Wars: The Force Awakens (11)

Television/radio coverage
- Network: MTV, MTV2, VH1, CMT, BET, VH1 Classic, TV Land, Comedy Central and Logo
- Produced by: Casey Patterson
- Directed by: Glenn Weiss

The 2016 MTV Movie Awards were held on April 9, 2016, from Warner Bros. Studios in Burbank, California, as the first such event in 21 years, as well as being the first Movie Awards to be held outdoors. In addition, this year's awards also became the first since the 2006 MTV Movie Awards not to be aired live, as the event was pre-recorded on April 9 prior to its April 10 broadcast date, and the first since the 2003 MTV Movie Awards to include two hosts, instead of one.

== Performers ==
- Halsey – "Castle"
- Dwayne Johnson, Kevin Hart, Adam DeVine, Anthony Mackie, and Rebel Wilson – "25th Anniversary Tribute Rap"
- Salt-N-Pepa – "Shoop"^{a}
- The Lonely Island – "Will Smith Medley"
- Ariana Grande – "Dangerous Woman"

a Salt-N-Pepa performed right before Ryan Reynolds accepted the award for Best Comedic Performance.

== Presenters ==
- Miles Teller – presented Best Female Performance
- Keegan-Michael Key and Jordan Peele – presented Best Virtual Performance
- Chris Evans – presented exclusive clip to Captain America: Civil War
- Chris Hemsworth, Charlize Theron, and Jessica Chastain – introduced Halsey
- Jesse Eisenberg, Lizzy Caplan, and Woody Harrelson – presented Best Action Performance
- Common – introduced the MTV Movie Awards 25th anniversary tribute and Kendrick Lamar
- Kendrick Lamar – presented True Story
- Seth Rogen and Zac Efron – presented Best Comedic Performance
- Kevin Hart – introduced The Lonely Island
- Queen Latifah and Halle Berry – presented the MTV Generation Award
- Anna Kendrick, Zac Efron, and Adam DeVine – presented Best Breakthrough Performance
- Kendall Jenner and Gigi Hadid – introduced Ariana Grande
- Stephen Amell – presented Best Kiss
- Will Smith, Margot Robbie, Cara Delevingne, and Jared Leto – presented the exclusive trailer to Suicide Squad
- Dwayne Johnson and Kevin Hart – presented the Comedic Genius Award
- Emilia Clarke and Andy Samberg – presented Best Fight
- Eddie Redmayne – presented the teaser for Fantastic Beasts and Where to Find Them
- Alexander Skarsgård and Samuel L. Jackson – presented Movie of the Year

== Films with multiple nominations ==
The following films received multiple nominations:

- Eleven – Star Wars: The Force Awakens
- Eight – Deadpool
- Six – Avengers: Age of Ultron
- Four – Mad Max: Fury Road, Pitch Perfect 2, The Revenant, Trainwreck
- Three – The Hunger Games: Mockingjay – Part 2, Jurassic World, Straight Outta Compton
- Two – Concussion, Creed, Fifty Shades of Grey, Furious 7, Joy, San Andreas, Spy.

== Multiple winners ==
- Three – Star Wars: The Force Awakens
- Two – Pitch Perfect 2, Deadpool

== Awards ==
The results were announced on April 9, 2016. Winners are listed first and highlighted in boldface.

Movie of the Year	Best Male Performance
**Star Wars: The Force Awakens**; Avengers: Age of Ultron; Creed; Deadpool; Jurassic World; Straight Outta Compton	**Leonardo DiCaprio – The Revenant**; Matt Damon – The Martian; Michael B. Jordan – Creed; Chris Pratt – Jurassic World; Ryan Reynolds – Deadpool; Will Smith – Concussion
Best Female Performance	Breakthrough Performance
**Charlize Theron – Mad Max: Fury Road**; Morena Baccarin – Deadpool; Anna Kendrick – Pitch Perfect 2; Jennifer Lawrence – Joy; Daisy Ridley – Star Wars: The Force Awakens; Alicia Vikander – Ex Machina	**Daisy Ridley – Star Wars: The Force Awakens**; John Boyega – Star Wars: The Force Awakens; O'Shea Jackson, Jr. – Straight Outta Compton; Dakota Johnson – Fifty Shades of Grey; Brie Larson – Room; Amy Schumer – Trainwreck
True Story	Documentary
**Straight Outta Compton**; The Big Short; Concussion; Joy; The Revenant; Steve Jobs	**Amy**; Cartel Land; He Named Me Malala; The Hunting Ground; What Happened, Miss Simone?; The Wolfpack
Best Comedic Performance	Best Fight
**Ryan Reynolds – Deadpool**; Will Ferrell – Get Hard; Kevin Hart – Ride Along 2; Melissa McCarthy – Spy; Amy Schumer – Trainwreck; Rebel Wilson – Pitch Perfect 2	**Ryan Reynolds vs. Ed Skrein – Deadpool**; Leonardo DiCaprio vs. The Bear – The Revenant; Robert Downey, Jr., vs. Mark Ruffalo – Avengers: Age of Ultron; Melissa McCarthy vs. Nargis Fakhri – Spy; Daisy Ridley vs. Adam Driver – Star Wars: The Force Awakens; Charlize Theron vs. Tom Hardy – Mad Max: Fury Road
Best Kiss	Best Villain
**Rebel Wilson & Adam DeVine – Pitch Perfect 2**; Morena Baccarin & Ryan Reynolds – Deadpool; Dakota Johnson & Jamie Dornan – Fifty Shades of Grey; Leslie Mann & Chris Hemsworth – Vacation; Margot Robbie & Will Smith – Focus; Amy Schumer & Bill Hader – Trainwreck	**Adam Driver – Star Wars: The Force Awakens**; Tom Hardy – The Revenant; Samuel L. Jackson – Kingsman: The Secret Service; Hugh Keays-Byrne – Mad Max: Fury Road; Ed Skrein – Deadpool; James Spader – Avengers: Age of Ultron
Best Action Performance	Best Virtual Performance
**Chris Pratt – Jurassic World**; John Boyega – Star Wars: The Force Awakens; Vin Diesel – Furious 7; Dwayne Johnson – San Andreas; Jennifer Lawrence – The Hunger Games: Mockingjay – Part 2; Ryan Reynolds – Deadpool	**Amy Poehler – Inside Out**; Jack Black – Kung Fu Panda 3; Seth MacFarlane – Ted 2; Lupita Nyong'o – Star Wars: The Force Awakens; Andy Serkis – Star Wars: The Force Awakens; James Spader – Avengers: Age of Ultron
Ensemble Cast	Best Hero
**Pitch Perfect 2**; Avengers: Age of Ultron; Furious 7; The Hunger Games: Mockingjay – Part 2; Star Wars: The Force Awakens; Trainwreck	**Jennifer Lawrence – The Hunger Games: Mockingjay – Part 2**; Chris Evans – Avengers: Age of Ultron; Dwayne Johnson – San Andreas; Daisy Ridley – Star Wars: The Force Awakens; Paul Rudd – Ant-Man; Charlize Theron – Mad Max: Fury Road

=== MTV Generation Award ===
- Will Smith

=== Comedic Genius Award ===
- Melissa McCarthy
