= Marina Mazepa =

Ukrainian actress, model, dancer, and contortionist

- Марина Мазепа
- Born: May 7, 1997 (age 29); Konotop, Ukraine
- Citizenship: Ukraine
- Occupations: Actress, model, dancer, and contortionist
- Years active: 2015–present

Marina Mazepa (Ukrainian: Марина Мазепа, Maryna Mazepa [mɐˈrɪnɐ mɐˈzɛpɐ]; born May 7, 1997) is a Ukrainian actress, model, dancer, and contortionist. She is known for competing in the fourteenth season of America's Got Talent and reaching the quarterfinals. She has also competed in talent show competitions such as So You Think You Can Dance, France's Got Talent, and Ukraine's Everybody Dance! As an actress, she has appeared in films such as Malignant, The Unholy, and Resident Evil: Welcome to Raccoon City.

== Early life ==
Mazepa was born on May 7, 1997, in Konotop, Ukraine. She has an older brother named Ruslan. She began taking folk dance lessons at the age of 5. Her ninth grade teacher urged her to join the Academy of Circus and Variety Arts in Kyiv, despite the objections of her parents, who wished for her to study law. She began attending the academy after her parents relented when she passed her school exams and received a scholarship.

== Career ==
In 2015, Mazepa won The Challenge Ukrainian Dance Championship in the Contemporary Solo Varsity category. She also starred in a lead role in the dance circus show "Fairytale Show: Alice in Wonderland Countries". In the same year, she also competed in the televised Ukrainian dance competition Everybody Dance!, which is based on the format of America's So You Think You Can Dance. She made it into the competition's top 5.

From 2016 to 2017, Mazepa performed as a contortionist at Europa-Park's "Cirque d'Europe" dinner show. In 2017, she also served as a pole-contortion performer in the park's "Night Beat Angels" show.

In 2017, she performed in the Young Stage International Circus Festival as a pole dance artist. Mazepa also served as a dance trainer and choreographer at the 2017 Ladies Only Festival in Germany. She also competed in the 12th season of France's Got Talent, reaching the finals. In the same year, she starred in the music video for the song "Freedom or Sweet Captivity" by Russian singer Valery Meladze.

In 2018, Mazepa competed on the original So You Think You Can Dance program in the United States. She passed the first round of auditions, but decided not to continue on the show so she could prepare for her America's Got Talent audition.

Mazepa moved to Los Angeles after finishing her contract as a choreographer for a circus-style show in Las Vegas. Shortly afterwards in 2019, she showcased her skills as a dancer and contortionist on America's Got Talent, before being eliminated in the quarterfinals.

In 2020, she joined the cast of the Sam Raimi-produced horror film, The Unholy, based on the novel Shrine.

Mazepa was the primary contortionist who portrayed the character Gabriel in James Wan's horror film Malignant, which was released in 2021. She also portrayed Lisa Trevor in the 2021 film Resident Evil: Welcome to Raccoon City. In the same year, she also served as the face of high-heel footwear brand United Nude's Spring/Summer 2021 campaign. In September 2023, Mazepa played Gretel in The Continental.

== Filmography ==
=== Film ===
| Year | Title | Role | Notes |
|---|---|---|---|
| 2021 | The Unholy | Mary Elnor | |
| 2021 | Malignant | Gabriel | Physical performer |
| 2021 | Resident Evil: Welcome to Raccoon City | Lisa Trevor | |
| 2022 | Time Bomb | Herself | Short |
| 2024 | Darkness of Man | Natalia | |
| TBD | Rise of the Tarragon | Shiro Kozlov | Pre-production |

=== Television ===
| Year | Title | Role | Notes |
|---|---|---|---|
| 2015 | Everybody Dance! | Herself | Contestant |
| 2017 | The Tactical Combat Simulator | Fighter | Episode: "Second Round: Tenth Fight" |
| 2017 | La France a un incroyable talent | Herself | Contestant |
| 2018 | So You Think You Can Dance | Herself | Contestant |
| 2019 | America's Got Talent: season 14 | Herself | Contestant |
| 2020 | Savage/Love | Fabianna | TV miniseries; episode: "Tangled Up" |
| 2021 | The Girl In the Woods | The Echo | TV series |
| 2023 | The Continental: From the World of John Wick | Gretel | TV miniseries; 3 episodes |
| 2024 | Agatha All Along | Snake | TV miniseries; 3 episodes |
