= Snow White and the Huntsman =

2012 film by Rupert Sanders

- Theatrical release poster
- Directed by: Rupert Sanders
- Screenplay by: Evan Daugherty; John Lee Hancock; Hossein Amini
- Story by: Evan Daugherty
- Based on: "Snow White" by the Brothers Grimm
- Produced by: Joe Roth; Sam Mercer
- Starring: Kristen Stewart; Charlize Theron; Chris Hemsworth; Sam Claflin; Ian McShane; Bob Hoskins; Ray Winstone; Nick Frost; Toby Jones
- Cinematography: Greig Fraser
- Edited by: Conrad Buff; Neil Smith
- Music by: James Newton Howard
- Production company: Roth Films
- Distributed by: Universal Pictures
- Release dates: May 30, 2012 (United Kingdom); June 1, 2012 (United States)
- Running time: 127 minutes 131 minutes (extended edition)
- Country: United States
- Language: English
- Budget: $170 million
- Box office: $396.6 million

Snow White & the Huntsman is a 2012 American dark fantasy action-adventure film directed by Rupert Sanders and written by Evan Daugherty, John Lee Hancock, and Hossein Amini. Produced by Roth Films and distributed by Universal Pictures, the film is based on the Brothers Grimm's 1812 fairy tale "Snow White," and stars Kristen Stewart, Charlize Theron, Chris Hemsworth, and Sam Claflin. The plot follows princess Snow White, who grows up imprisoned by her evil stepmother, the powerful sorceress Ravenna. After Snow White escapes into the forest, Ravenna enlists a huntsman named Eric to capture her, but he eventually becomes Snow White's companion in a quest to overthrow Ravenna and end her dark reign.

Snow White & the Huntsman was theatrically released in the United Kingdom on May 30, 2012, and in the United States on June 1, 2012, by Universal Pictures. The film was a box office success, having grossed $396.6 million worldwide against a $170 million budget. Critics praised the production design and visual effects, and Theron's and Hemsworth's performances, as well as James Newton Howard's score, while the action sequences and Stewart's and Claflin's performances received mixed reviews. The film received two Oscar nominations for Best Visual Effects and Best Costume Design at the 85th Academy Awards; Stewart won Worst Actress at the 33rd Golden Raspberry Awards.

A sequel, titled The Huntsman: Winter's War, directed by the first film's visual effects supervisor Cedric Nicolas-Troyan, was released on April 22, 2016, with Hemsworth, Theron, Claflin, and Nick Frost reprising their roles.

== Plot ==
While admiring a bright red rose blooming during a white winter, Queen Eleanor of Tabor pricks her finger on its thorns. Three drops of blood fall onto the snow, and she wishes for a daughter with skin as white as snow, lips as red as blood, hair as black as a raven's wings, and a heart as strong as the rose.

The queen gives birth to Snow White but falls ill and dies many years later. After her death, Snow White's father, King Magnus, and his army battle an invading army of glass soldiers. King Magnus finds a prisoner called Ravenna, becomes enchanted with her beauty and marries her the next day.

Ravenna is in fact a powerful sorceress who used the false glass army to charm her way into the kingdom. On their wedding night, she confesses that there was a king much like Magnus that used her, hurt her, then discarded her. She kills him before taking over the kingdom. Snow White's childhood friend William and his father, Duke Hammond, escape but are unable to rescue her, and she is locked away in a tower for years. Ravenna does not know why she allowed Snow White to live, but has a feeling about her.

Tabor and its people deteriorate under Queen Ravenna's rule. She periodically drains the youth from the kingdom's young women in order to maintain a spell cast over her as a child by her mother, which allows Ravenna to keep her youthful beauty. When Snow White comes of age, Ravenna learns from her Magic Mirror that Snow White is destined to destroy her unless she consumes the girl's heart, which will make her immortal.

Ravenna sends her brother Finn to bring her the princess, but Snow White escapes into the Dark Forest, where Ravenna has no power. The Queen makes a bargain with Eric the Huntsman, a widower and drunkard, to capture her, promising to bring his wife back to life in exchange. However, when Finn reveals that Ravenna does not actually have the power to revive the dead, the Huntsman helps Snow White escape. The Duke and William learn that Snow White is alive, so William leaves the castle to find her, joining Finn's group as a bowman.

Snow White saves the Huntsman's life by charming a troll that attacks them. They make their way to a fishing village populated by women who have disfigured themselves to make themselves useless to Ravenna. The Huntsman learns Snow White's true identity, and leaves her in the care of the women. He quickly returns when he sees the village being burned down by Finn's men. Snow White and the Huntsman evade them and meet a band of eight dwarfs. The blind dwarf, Muir, perceives that Snow White is the only person who can end Ravenna's reign.

As they travel through a fairy sanctuary, they are attacked by Finn and his men. A battle ensues during which Finn, his men, and one of the dwarfs are killed. William joins the group on their journey to Hammond's castle. Ravenna disguises herself as William and tempts Snow White into eating a poisoned apple before fleeing. William kisses Snow White, though nothing happens. A single tear is shed from her eye.

Snow White's body is taken to Hammond's castle. The Huntsman professes his regret for being unable to save her, as her heart and strength remind him of his wife, Sara. He kisses her yet does not notice a second tear fall from her eyes, as two kisses of true love break the spell. Snow White awakens and rallies the Duke's army to mount a siege against Ravenna.

The dwarfs infiltrate the castle through the sewers and open the gates, allowing the army inside. Snow White and Ravenna fight. When Ravenna is about to kill her, Snow White uses a move the Huntsman taught her and stabs her to death in the heart. The kingdom once again enjoys peace as Snow White is crowned the new Queen of Tabor.

== Cast ==
- Kristen Stewart as Snow White, the daughter of King Magnus and Queen Eleanor and the step-daughter of the evil queen Ravenna.
  - Raffey Cassidy as young Snow White
- Charlize Theron as Ravenna, Snow White's evil stepmother
  - Izzy Meikle-Small as young Ravenna
- Chris Hemsworth as Eric the Huntsman, a widower and drunkard, who helps Snow White escape Ravenna.
- Sam Claflin as William, son of Duke Hammond
  - Xavier Atkins as young William
- Sam Spruell as Finn, Ravenna's younger brother and enforcer
  - Elliot Reeve as young Finn
- Vincent Regan as Duke Hammond, William's father
- Lily Cole as Greta, a young girl who befriends Snow White
- Noah Huntley as King Magnus, Snow White's father
- Liberty Ross as Queen Eleanor, Snow White's mother
- Chris Obi as the voice of Mirror Man, the physical form of the Magic Mirror
- Rachael Stirling as Anna
- Hattie Gotobed as Lily
- Greg Hicks as Black Knight General
- Peter Ferdinando as Black Knight
- Anastasia Hille as Ravenna's Mother
- Matt Berry as Percy

=== The Dwarves ===
The Dwarves were played by actors of average height who had their faces digitally attached to small bodies. This caused a protest from the Little People of America.

- Ian McShane as Beith, the leader of the Dwarves.
- Bob Hoskins as Muir, the blind elder Dwarf, who possesses the powers of premonition. This was Hoskins's final role before his retirement from acting later in 2012 due to Parkinson's disease, and subsequent death on April 29, 2014.
- Ray Winstone as Gort, an ill-tempered Dwarf.
- Nick Frost as Nion, Beith's right-hand man.
- Toby Jones as Coll, Duir's older brother.
- Eddie Marsan as Duir, Coll's younger brother.
- Johnny Harris as Quert, Muir's son.
- Brian Gleeson as Gus, the youngest of the Dwarves who develops a bond with Snow White and later sacrifices himself to save her.

== Production ==
=== Development ===
Evan Daugherty initially wrote the screenplay in 2003, when he was studying at NYU. At the time, gritty reboots of fairy tales were not a popular film genre and, according to Daugherty, "no one really knew what to do with it." More problems came when the release of Terry Gilliam's The Brothers Grimm (2005) flopped at the box office which caused potential buyers to be hesitant about the script. The script was finally greenlit after the success of Tim Burton's Alice in Wonderland (2010).

=== Casting ===
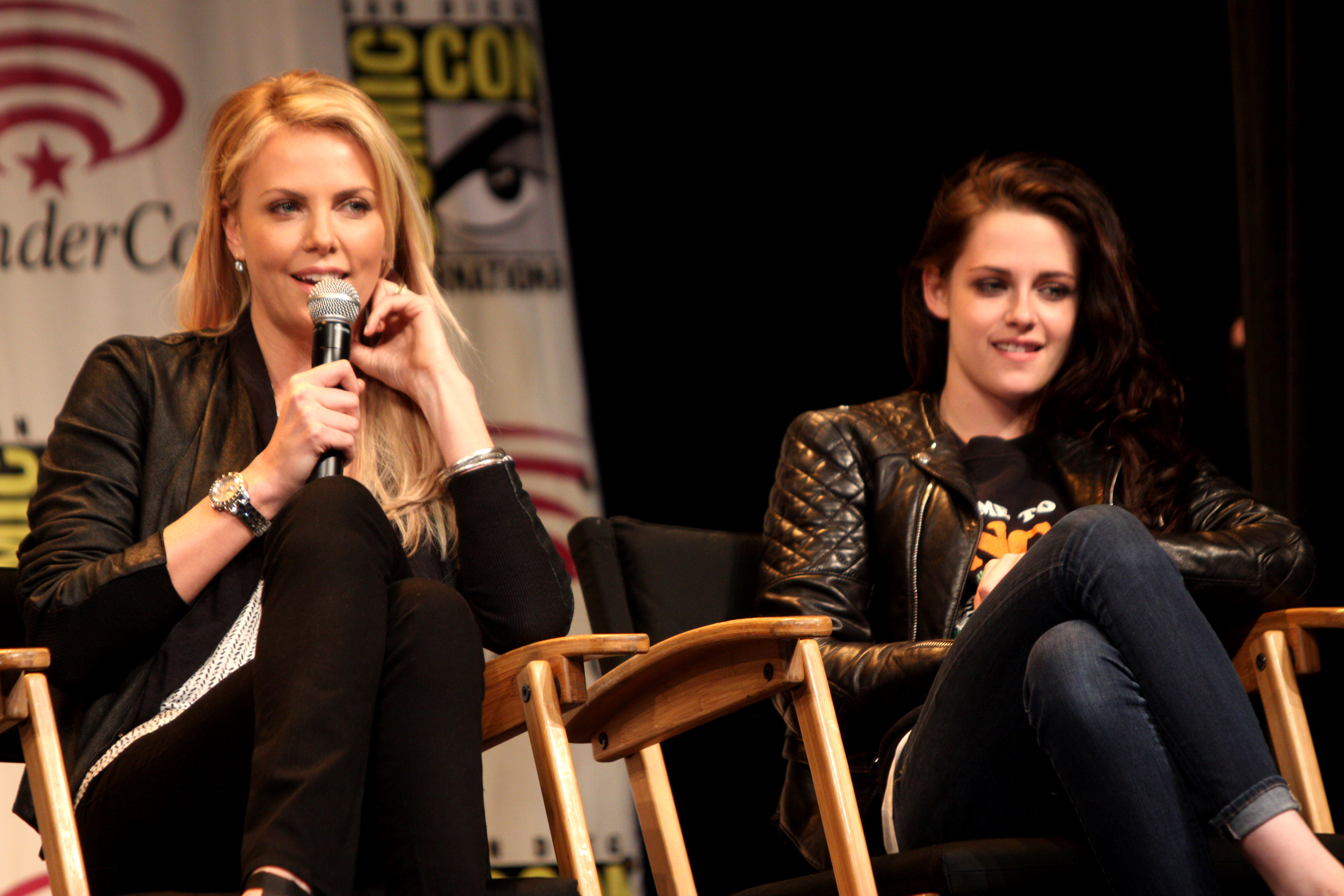
Theron and Stewart at Wondercon 2012 in Anaheim, California in March 2012

Film producers considered casting a lesser-known actress for the role of Snow White, with mention of Riley Keough, Felicity Jones, Bella Heathcote, Alicia Vikander, Lily Collins, and Rachel Maxwell as possible picks. This idea became less likely as known actresses Dakota Fanning and Kristen Stewart were later rumored to be short-listed for the role. On March 4, 2011, co-producer Palak Patel confirmed that Stewart was offered the role. Winona Ryder was initially considered to play Queen Ravenna, before the role went to Charlize Theron. Tom Hardy was supposedly first offered the role of Eric, the Huntsman, but turned down the offer. The role was then apparently offered to Michael Fassbender, and then Johnny Depp, but both claim to have declined it. Viggo Mortensen was said to have been in negotiations with Universal for the part, but supposedly turned down the role, too. It was claimed that Hugh Jackman was offered the role, but that he declined. In 2011, Thor star Chris Hemsworth was eventually cast in the role of the Huntsman.

=== Filming ===
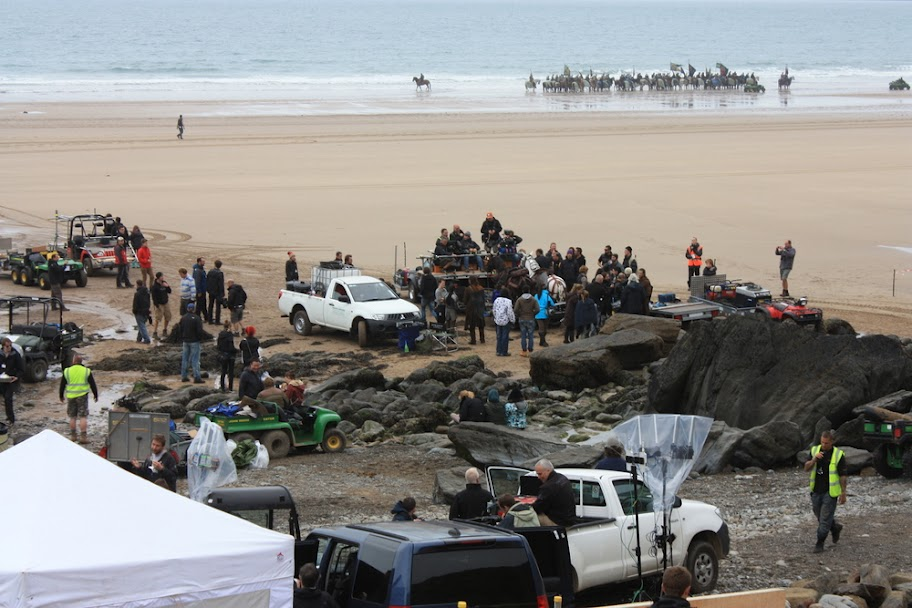
The Marloes Sands filming location for Snow White & the Huntsman

Principal photography took place in the United Kingdom. Most indoor scenes were shot at Pinewood Studios. The beach scenes were predominantly filmed in Pembrokeshire, Wales, on the Marloes Sands beach near the village of Marloes between September 26 and 29, 2011. Though the beach was not closed to the public during filming, as filming progressed, certain parts were advised to be off limits. A computer-generated castle was set on nearby Gateholm island. A field above the beach was used for production purposes, and a special wooden ramp was built for vehicles and horses to access the beach. Filming also took place at Frensham Small Pond. The film used academic consultants from the University of Chichester and the University of Oxford for back-up research on fairy tales and medieval battles.

=== Music ===
James Newton Howard composed the music for the film. The English band Florence and the Machine recorded "Breath of Life" exclusively for the film, which was reportedly inspired by Theron's character Queen Ravenna. Ioanna Gika of Io Echo performed "Gone", a song that is played at Gus's funeral in the film.

== Release ==
The film had its premiere on May 14, 2012, at the Empire, Leicester Square, in London. The film was released on DVD and Blu-ray in Region 1 on September 11, 2012, with both the theatrical version (127 minutes) and an extended version (132 minutes) available on both formats. The film was released on the same formats in Region 2 on October 1, 2012.

A book based on the film was published June 5, 2012.

== Reception ==
=== Box office ===
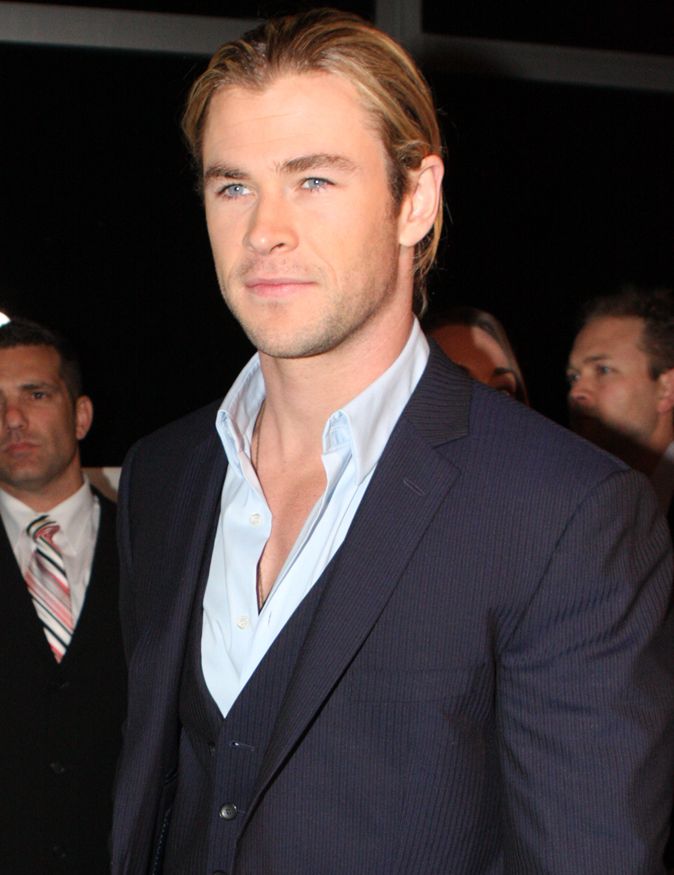
Hemsworth at the Snow White & the Huntsman movie premiere, Sydney in June 2012

Snow White & the Huntsman earned $155.3 million in North America, along with $241.3 million in other territories, for a worldwide total of $396.6 million. In North America, the film earned $1.38 million from midnight showings. For its opening day, the film topped the box office with $20.5 million. It debuted in first place at the box office during its opening weekend with $56.2 million. It is the seventeenth highest-grossing 2012 film. Outside North America, Snow White & the Huntsman had an opening of $39.3 million, ranking second overall for the weekend behind Men in Black 3; however, it ranked number 1 in 30 countries.

=== Critical response ===
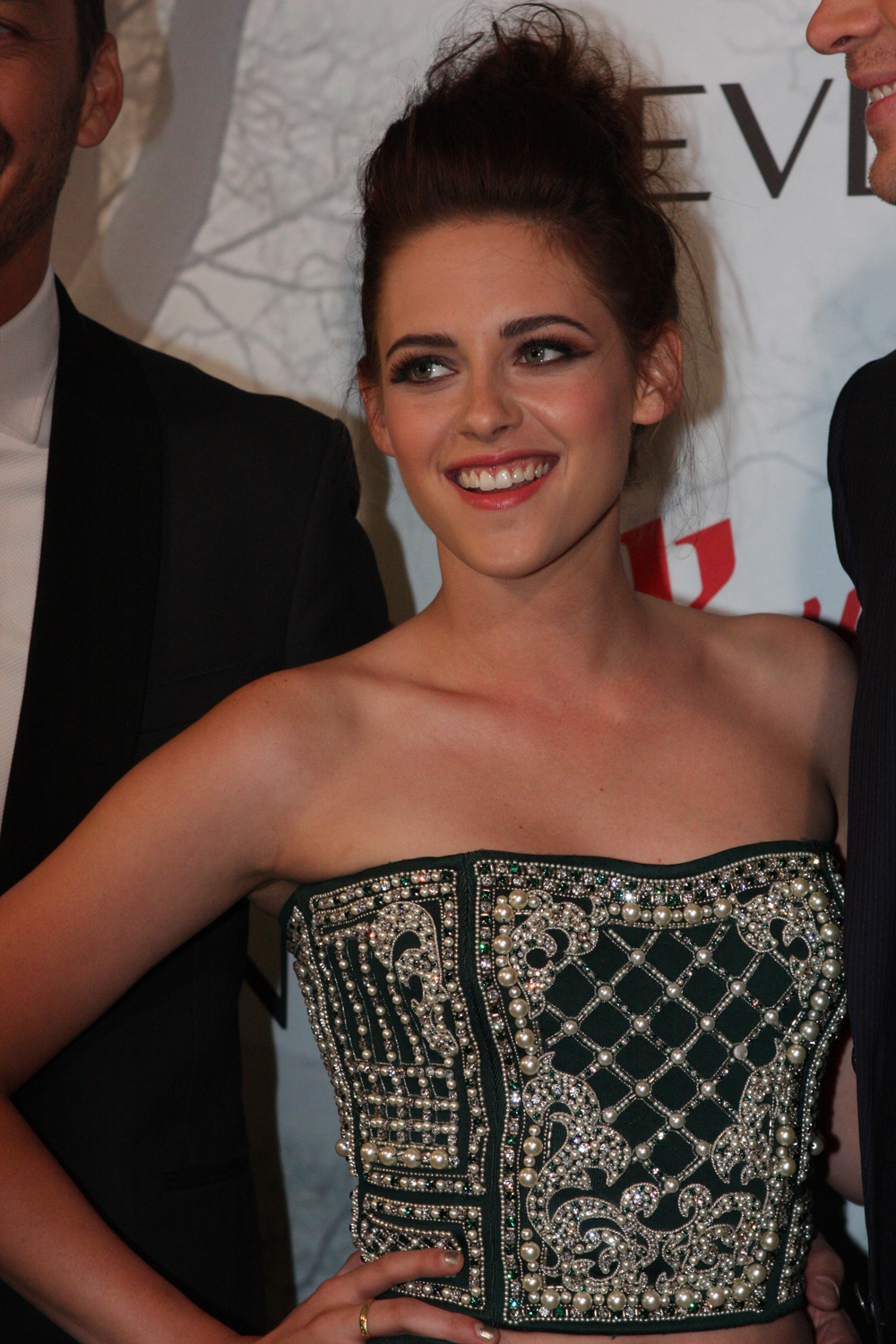
Stewart at the Snow White & the Huntsman premiere, Sydney in June 2012

Snow White & the Huntsman received mixed reviews from critics. The film has a 48% score on Rotten Tomatoes based on 235 reviews, with an average rating of 5.6/10. The site's consensus states: "While it offers an appropriately dark take on the fairy tale that inspired it, Snow White & the Huntsman is undone by uneven acting, problematic pacing, and a confused script." On Metacritic, the film has a score of 57 out of 100, based on 39 critics, indicating "mixed or average reviews". CinemaScore polls conducted revealed the average grade that filmgoers gave the film was a "B" on an A+ to F scale.

David Edelstein of New York praised the film's revisionist tone and said the film was "strongly influenced by a lot of smart, feminist thinking". Roger Ebert gave the film 3.5 stars out of 4 and said: "Snow White and the Huntsman reinvents the legendary story in a film of astonishing beauty and imagination. It's the last thing you would expect from a picture with this title. It falters in its storytelling, because Snow White must be entirely good, the Queen must be entirely bad, and there's no room for nuance. The end is therefore predetermined. But, oh, what a ride"; and concluded: "There is a great film here somewhere, perhaps one that allowed greater complexity for the characters. But considering that I walked in expecting no complexity at all, let alone the visual wonderments, Snow White and the Huntsman is a considerable experience". A.O. Scott of The New York Times praised Theron's performance and also wrote, "Though it is an ambitious – at times mesmerizing – application of the latest cinematic technology, the movie tries to recapture some of the menace of the stories that used to be told to scare children rather than console them." Owen Gleiberman of Entertainment Weekly wrote, "Ravenna hates living in a world where men can feed on women's beauty and then toss them away. She's a fascist of feminism, and Theron's acting has the blood of operatic anger coursing through it." Betsy Sharkey of the Los Angeles Times said the film is, "an absolute wonder to watch and creates a warrior princess for the ages. But what this revisionist fairy tale does not give us is a passionate love – its kisses are as chaste as the snow is white." Rolling Stone's Peter Travers called it "a visual marvel" while noting that Stewart "morphs convincingly from a skittish girl into a determined warrior princess." MSN News said that Stewart "grows into her character, it seems, and eventually got this reviewer completely on her side." Colin Covert of the Minneapolis Star Tribune gave the film 4/4 stars. Richard Roeper of the Chicago Sun-Times gave the movie a B+, calling it "Vastly superior to Mirror, Mirror", and praising Theron and Stewart's performances.

Peter Bradshaw of The Guardian said that while the film is "less jokey than the recent Mirror Mirror", "this Twilightified fairytale has the same basic problem," and that, "The result is tangled and overblown." Mick LaSalle of the San Francisco Chronicle called it "[a] slow, boring film that has no charm and is highlighted only by a handful of special effects and Charlize Theron's truly evil queen." Michael O'Sullivan of The Washington Post also gave the film a negative review: "Overlong, overcrowded, overstimulating and with an over-the-top performance by Charlize Theron as the evil queen Ravenna, the movie is a virtual orchard of toxic excess, starting with the unnecessarily sprawling cast of characters." Lisa Kennedy of The Denver Post gave the film two out of four stars and said, "Only Bob Hoskins as the blind seer Muir comes close to making us care. We can almost glean Snow White's heroic possibilities through his clouded eyes. As much as we'd like to, we certainly can't from Stewart's efforts." Film Comment's Scott Foundas states that "Stewart's Snow White... pouts her lips, bats her bedroom eyes, and scarcely seems to have more on her mind than who might take her to the senior prom—let alone the destiny of an entire kingdom."

== Accolades ==
List of awards and nominations
Year	Recipient	Award	Category	Result
2012	Charlize Theron	Teen Choice Award	Choice Movie: Hissy Fit	Won
2012	Kristen Stewart	Teen Choice Award	Choice Summer Movie Star: Female	Won
2012	Chris Hemsworth	Teen Choice Award	Choice Summer Movie Star: Male (also for The Avengers)	Won
2012	Sam Claflin	Teen Choice Award	Choice Movie: Breakout	Nominated
2012	Charlize Theron	Teen Choice Award	Choice Movie: Villain	Nominated
2012	Charlize Theron	Teen Choice Award	Choice Summer Movie Star: Female (also for Prometheus)	Nominated
2012	Chris Hemsworth	GQ Award	GQ Men Of The Year Award for International Breakthrough	Won
2012	Colleen Atwood	Gucci Award	Best Costume Design	Nominated
2012	Florence and the Machine	World Soundtrack Awards	Best Original Song Written Directly for a Film	Nominated
2012	Chris Munro and Craig Henighan	Satellite Award	Best Sound (Editing & Mixing)	Nominated
2012	Wild Card and Universal Pictures	Golden Trailer Award	Best Action (for "Forever")	Won
2012	Universal Pictures	Golden Trailer Award	Best Summer Blockbuster 2012 TV Spot (for "Ravenna")	Won
2012	Universal Pictures	Golden Trailer Award	Best Motion/Title Graphics (for "Domestic Trailer 2")	Nominated
2012	Universal Pictures and Wild Card	Golden Trailer Award	Best Summer Blockbuster 2012 TV Spot (for "Bound")	Nominated
2012	Universal Pictures and Aspect Ratio	Golden Trailer Award	Best Summer Blockbuster 2012 TV Spot (for "Kingdom")	Nominated
2012	Universal Pictures and Wild Card	Golden Trailer Award	Best in Show (for "Forever")	Nominated
2012	Cedric Nicolas-Troyan, Philip Brennan, Neil Corbould, and Michael Dawson	St. Louis Gateway Film Critics Association	Best Visual Effects	Nominated
2012	Greig Fraser	San Diego Film Critics Society Awards	Special Award	Won
2012		People's Choice Awards	Favorite Film	Nominated
2013	Chris Hemsworth	People's Choice Awards	Favorite Action Movie Star (also for The Avengers)	Nominated
2013	Charlize Theron	People's Choice Awards	Favorite Dramatic Movie Actress (also for Prometheus)	Nominated
2013	Kristen Stewart and Chris Hemsworth	People's Choice Awards	Favorite On-Screen Chemistry	Nominated
2013	Kristen Stewart	People's Choice Awards	Favorite Face of Heroism	Nominated
2013	Colleen Atwood	Academy Awards	Best Costume Design	Nominated
2013	Cedric Nicolas-Troyan, Philip Brennan, Neil Corbould, and Michael Dawson	Academy Awards	Best Visual Effects	Nominated
2013	Kristen Stewart	Golden Raspberry Awards	Worst Actress (also for The Twilight Saga: Breaking Dawn – Part 2)	Won
2013	Film	Saturn Awards	Best Fantasy Film	Nominated
2013	Charlize Theron	Saturn Awards	Best Supporting Actress	Nominated
2013	Colleen Atwood	Saturn Awards	Best Costume	Nominated
2013	Cedric Nicolas-Troyan, Philip Brennan, Neil Corbould and Michael Dawson	Saturn Awards	Best Special Effects	Nominated
2013	Kristen Stewart	2013 MTV Movie Awards	Best Hero	Nominated

== Sequel ==
A sequel was planned, with director Rupert Sanders in talks to return. In August 2012, The Hollywood Reporter reported that the sequel was shelved in the aftermath of a scandal involving Sanders having an extramarital affair with Stewart and that a spin-off film concentrating on the Huntsman was planned instead, which would not star Stewart. Universal announced a few days later that they were not shelving the sequel. A 2012 report stated that Universal has authorized a sequel and Stewart was set to reprise her role, but without Sanders to return as the director due to the scandal. The script was written and production was set to begin in 2013.

The film was originally scheduled for release in 2015. In September 2013, Chris Hemsworth stated he did not know anything about the sequel while speaking to E!. On June 4, 2014, Deadline reported that Frank Darabont, Gavin O'Connor and Andrés Muschietti were on the shortlist to direct the sequel. On June 26, 2014, Deadline reported that Darabont was in talks to direct the sequel. Originally Legendary Pictures was set to co-finance the film with Universal but dropped out and were replaced by Perfect World Pictures. On July 31, 2014, the project was described as a prequel titled The Huntsman scheduled for April 22, 2016, which would not star Stewart as Snow White. In January 2015, Darabont left the project as director, but the third leading role was set with Emily Blunt. It was later announced that Cedric Nicolas-Troyan would take over as the new director for the film. Nick Frost would return as Dwarf Nion and Jessica Chastain would star. On March 18, 2015, Rob Brydon, Alexandra Roach and Sheridan Smith were added to the cast as dwarves. TheWrap confirmed on May 7, 2015, that Sam Claflin would return as William in this sequel.

It was later revealed that the film would feature Ravenna's sister, the Ice Queen, and would reveal the origins of the Huntsman, while also continuing the story of the first film.

The film, which is both a prequel and a sequel, was released in 2016 as The Huntsman: Winter's War.

== See also ==
- List of films about witchcraft
- Grimm's Snow White, another 2012 film based on the tale of "Snow White".
- Mirror Mirror, another 2012 film based on the tale of "Snow White".
- Blancanieves, a Spanish film also released in 2012 based on the tale of "Snow White".
- Snow White: A Deadly Summer, an horror film also released in 2012 inspired by the tale of "Snow White".
