= Evan Daugherty =

American screenwriter

- Born: 1981 (age 44–45)
- Education: St. Mark's School of Texas, New York University
- Occupation: Screenwriter
- Years active: 2006–present

Evan Daugherty (born 1981) is an American screenwriter. He wrote the films Killing Season, Snow White and the Huntsman and the film adaptation of Divergent.

== Career ==
Daugherty's first recognized screenplay was Shrapnel. It won first place in the 2008 Script Pipeline contest and was featured in the 2008 Black List, for screenplays not yet made into films

Daugherty also wrote, directed, and edited the short film Rusty Forkblade, which won the 2007 Bronze Medal for Excellence at the Park City Film Music Festival. Warner Bros. announced in 2009 that John Stevenson, director of Kung Fu Panda, was working on a new He-Man film, Grayskull, with scripting duties handed to Daugherty.

Daugherty's original screenplay, Snow White and the Huntsman was sold to Universal Pictures for $3.2 million. It was later altered by John Lee Hancock and Hossein Amini. Daugherty's idea for Snow White and the Huntsman came from a homework assignment by his professor at New York University to "take a new spin on a classic fairytale". According to the Writer's Guild, he contributed 50%-60% of the screenplay, with Hancock and Amini each contributing 20%-25%.

Daugherty performed rewrites on Teenage Mutant Ninja Turtles. In 2015 the film was nominated for five Golden Raspberry Awards, including Worst Screenplay.

Daughtery was attached to a third G.I. Joe film for Paramount Pictures. He was also set to write and executive produce Esmeralda for ABC, based on The Hunchback of Notre-Dame, though no new details have since emerged. He contributed material to the 2018 reboot of Tomb Raider.

== Filmography ==
Short film

| Year | Title | Director | Writer | Editor | Award |
|---|---|---|---|---|---|
| 2006 | Rusty Forkblade | Yes | Yes | Yes | Bronze Medal for Excellence |

Film writer

- Snow White and the Huntsman (2012)
- Killing Season (2013)
- Divergent (2014)
- Teenage Mutant Ninja Turtles (2014)
- Tomb Raider (Story only) (2018)

Miniseries

| Year | Title | Director | Writer | Ref. |
|---|---|---|---|---|
| 2013 | The Four Players | Yes | Yes | |

== See also ==
- Notable alumni of St. Mark's School of Texas
