= Lisa Trevor =

Resident Evil antagonist

- Resident Evil character
- Lisa Trevor in Resident Evil (2002)
- First appearance: Resident Evil (2002)
- Created by: Shinji Mikami
- Portrayed by: Marina Mazepa (Welcome to Raccoon City)

Lisa Trevor (Note: Japanese: リサ・トレヴァ, Hepburn: Risa Torebā) is a character in the Resident Evil video game series. She is an addition to the 2002 remake of the original Resident Evil game. She is portrayed as a grotesque or monstrous form, wearing a sewed mask of different faces. She is largely invulnerable to damage after being used in viral experimentation.

Lisa was created by Shinji Mikami, who hoped that players would overcome their initial revulsion and develop sympathy for the character after learning her backstory. Lisa was positively received by critics, who considered her both one of the most frightening and tragic characters in the Resident Evil series.

== Concept and design ==
Lisa Trevor is a human who was transformed into a monstrous form after being injected with a recently discovered strain of virus. This caused her to develop superhuman strength, though she experienced deterioration over time, in part due to the loss of her mother. When Lisa's mental state deteriorated, she reacted aggressively against her captors and even killed a Spencer employee who tried to pass for her mother. Lisa ripped off the employee's face and attempted to return it to her mother, who had died as a result of the virus trials. Lisa has a collection of faces that she has sewn together and wears.

When designing the 2002 remake of the original Resident Evil (1996), director Shinji Mikami wanted to make players feel sympathy for Lisa by reading her backstory. He ensured that the player could choose not to engage in combat with her in the final encounter. Mikami stated that he preferred that players not kill her, saying he wanted people instead to feel sympathy for an "innocent victim". When making the film Resident Evil: Welcome to Raccoon City (2021), writer and director Johannes Roberts wanted to make her a three-dimensional character rather than "some creepy specter". He said that he was always fascinated by her character, describing her as "disturbing and ... strangely haunting". In the film, she is portrayed by Marina Mazepa.

== Appearances ==
Lisa Trevor first appears in the 2002 remake of the original Resident Evil game, with her story spanning multiple decades. She is the daughter of George Trevor, the architect of the Spencer Mansion, the setting of the game, and his wife Jessica. Before the events of the game, while a teenage girl, she and her mother were abducted and experimented on, each injected with a different strain of virus. Whereas her mother did not adapt to the virus and was killed, Lisa was able to survive. She became mentally unwell due to her mother's death, and ended up taking the face of a caretaker, which she believed to be a copy of her mother's. Her captors were unable to kill her, so they dumped her body in the neighbouring Arklay mountains, where she survived in the wild. For years, Lisa wandered the woods and the tunnels beneath the Spencer estate, the Arklay Laboratory, desperate to find her mother. During the game, the player encounters her multiple times, and is unable to kill her. During the final encounter with Lisa, the player can either kill her by causing her to fall into a chasm, or cause Jessica's coffin to be opened and her fate revealed to Lisa, at which point Lisa takes her mother's skull and falls into the chasm.

=== Other appearances ===
Lisa appears in Resident Evil: The Umbrella Chronicles (2007), where she confronts Albert Wesker while he attempts to escape the Spencer mansion. Wesker defeats Lisa, leaving her incapacitated under a chandelier before the mansion explodes.

Lisa appears in the non-canon live-action Resident Evil film Resident Evil: Welcome to Raccoon City (2021). Compared to the game, she is depicted as a helpful, compassionate being rather than a menace.

== Reception ==
Lisa Trevor has generally been received positively. Her story was identified by Rock Paper Shotgun writer Adam Smith as the highlight of the 2002 remake of the original Resident Evil's story. Bloody Disgusting writer Trace Thurman identified her as his favorite thing about the series, stating that she edged out other elements due her tragic and detailed backstory. PCGamesN writer Nic Reuben and Marshall Lemon of The Escapist also found her story tragic, with Reuben stating that the yearning to be reunited with her mother made her and her "shambling, feral appearance" so tragic. He believed that the tragedy of her story recontextualized the game's story by adding an "undeniably human current" to the game's "high camp" style. Nintendo Life staff writer Philip Reed regarded Lisa as one of the most memorable characters from Resident Evil, saying she still "haunts" him. Matthew Bryd of Den of Geek credited Lisa's storyline, while her boss battle in the remake received praise. He stated that the discovery that she was a young child subjected to terrible experiments inside the Spencer Mansion presents a "lumbering monster" that is both "horrifying and tragic". He talks about the remake's capacity to communicate a message far more profound than improved graphics by utilising enhanced technologies.

Several journalists described Lisa as a terrifying and disturbing villain. Lisa was also praised by several critics as one of the greatest bosses and villains in Resident Evil, with Aaron Potter of Den of Geek stating that she was more than a "ho-hum boss fight", but instead, a "fully-formed character" due to her backstory. Author Federico Alvarez Igarzábal described Lisa as a subversion of the "Chekhov's BFG" trope, presenting an enemy against whom a powerful weapon is ineffectual. Rather than defeat Lisa as expected, players attempting to use their newly acquired weapon would merely waste valuable ammunition.
