= Castle (song) =

Single by Halsey

from the album Badlands and The Huntsman: Winter's War (Original Motion Picture Soundtrack)
- Released: April 9, 2016
- Genre: Electropop
- Length: 4:20
- Label: Astralwerks; Capitol
- Songwriters: Ashley Frangipane; Peder Losnegård
- Producer: Lido

Halsey singles chronology
"Colors" (2016)	"Castle" (2016)	"Hands" (2016)

Music video
- "Castle" on YouTube

"Castle" (subtitled "The Huntsman: Winter's War Version") is a song by American singer and songwriter Halsey. Originally recorded for her debut studio album, Badlands (2015), it was re-recorded for the soundtrack to the 2016 film The Huntsman: Winter's War. It was released on April 9, 2016, through Capitol Records as a single from the soundtrack as well as the fourth single from Badlands. "Castle" was co-written by Halsey and the track's producer, Lido. The song was used in commercials and in the teaser trailer to promote the film. The song has background vocals of a choir singing Agnus Dei. She is singing about taking the throne and the kingdom are locked up, which is a reference to her album Badlands.

== Composition ==
Nathan Reese from Pitchfork said "Castle" is a meditation on Halsey's growing fame that features a trip hop instrumental.

== Music video ==
A "Behind-the-Scenes" video was released for the song on Halsey's official Vevo channel on YouTube on April 8, 2016, one day prior to the single's digital download release. Five days later, on April 13, 2016, the official music video was released on Halsey's Vevo account.

== In the media ==
The album version of "Castle" was featured on TV shows such as The Royals.

== Track listing ==
Digital download

1. "Castle (The Huntsman: Winter's War version)" – 4:20

== Chart performance ==
Chart (2016)	Peak position
Australia (ARIA Charts)	76
France (SNEP)	143
Scotland (Official Charts Company)	80
UK Downloads (Official Charts Company)	85
US Bubbling Under Hot 100 (Billboard)	1

== Certifications ==
Certifications for "Castle"
Region	Certification	Certified units/sales
Australia (ARIA)	Gold	35,000^{‡}
Brazil (Pro-Música Brasil)	Platinum	60,000^{‡}
New Zealand (RMNZ)	Platinum	30,000^{‡}
United Kingdom (BPI)	Silver	200,000^{‡}
United States (RIAA)	2× Platinum	2,000,000^{‡}
^{‡} Sales+streaming figures based on certification alone.
