= Fantastic Beasts and Where to Find Them (soundtrack) =

Fantastic Beasts and Where to Find Them (Original Motion Picture Soundtrack)

Film score by James Newton Howard
- Released: 4 November 2016 (vinyl); 18 November 2016 (digital/physical)
- Recorded: 2016
- Studios: Abbey Road Studios (Westminster, London)
- Genre: Soundtrack
- Length: 72:00 (Standard edition); 100:00 (Deluxe edition)
- Label: WaterTower Music
- Producers: James Newton Howard; Sven Faulconer

James Newton Howard chronology
The Huntsman: Winter's War (2016)	Fantastic Beasts and Where to Find Them (Original Motion Picture Soundtrack) (2016)	Detroit (2017)

Fantastic Beasts and Where to Find Them (Original Motion Picture Soundtrack) is the film score to the 2016 film of the same name, composed by James Newton Howard. A limited edition vinyl was first released on 4 November 2016. The soundtrack was later released in both digital and physical formats on 18 November 2016 by WaterTower Music.

== Background ==
On 6 April 2016, it was announced that James Newton Howard would be composing the music for the film with veteran Harry Potter director David Yates at the helm and J. K. Rowling penning the screenplay. Howard stated that the film posed a "particular challenge" for him as it needed to be different and distinguishable from the previous Harry Potter films which saw iconic themes from acclaimed composers John Williams, Patrick Doyle, Nicholas Hooper and Alexandre Desplat. In an interview with Pottermore, Howard stated that "it really is a balance of keeping the magic, the slight tension and the comedy. You don't want it to be too much one way or the other. It's always a balancing act between things like pace, character point of view, action and humour." Discussions with Yates, suggested that the music should feel "like we're being invited into a grand adventure".

Howard spent the majority of the time writing the themes at his piano for the main characters. For the character of Newt, he wrote two primary themes, a theme that displays Newt's warm personality and whimsicalness, and a theme for Newt's heroic actions which Howard calls "kind of the big, muscular hero theme". For Jacob, Howard crafted a tune that encompasses "lazy, bluesy 1920s quasi-jazzy kind". There were also themes for the creatures namely, the Erumpent, Demiguise and the Niffler.

The score was conducted by Pete Anthony with a 97-piece of the London Symphony Orchestra and was recorded at Abbey Road Studios in London, with orchestrations provided by Anthony, Jeff Atmajian, Peter Boyer, David Butterworth, Chris Egan, Jim Honeyman, Philip Klein, Jon Kull and John Ashton Thomas. The score was mixed by Shawn Murphy.

== Track listing ==
All tracks are composed and performed by James Newton Howard.

Standard edition
No.	Title	Music	Length
1.	"Main Titles (Fantastic Beasts and Where to Find Them)"	Includes Hedwig's Theme by John Williams	2:56
2.	"There Are Witches Among Us / The Bank / The Niffler"	Includes Hedwig's Theme by John Williams	6:55
3.	"Tina Takes Newt In / Macusa Headquarters"		1:57
4.	"Pie or Strudel / Escaping Queenie and Tina's Place"		3:06
5.	"Credence Hands Out Leaflets"		2:05
6.	"Inside The Case"		9:10
7.	"The Erumpent"		3:30
8.	"In The Cells"		2:12
9.	"Tina and Newt Trial / Let's Get The Good Stuff Out / You're One of Us Now / Swooping Evil"		8:01
10.	"Gnarlak Negotiations"		2:58
11.	"The Demiguise and The Occamy"		4:07
12.	"A Close Friend"		1:52
13.	"The Obscurus / Rooftop Chase"		3:50
14.	"He's Listening To You Tina"		2:07
15.	"Relieve Him of His Wand / Newt Releases the Thunderbird / Jacob's Farewell"		12:34
16.	"Newt Says Goodbye to Tina / Jacob's Bakery"		3:28
17.	"End Titles (Fantastic Beasts and Where to Find Them)"		2:22
Total length:			73:00

All tracks are composed and performed by James Newton Howard, except where noted.

Deluxe edition - Disc 2
No.	Title	Length
1.	"A Man and His Beasts"	8:31
2.	"Soup and Leaflets"	2:20
3.	"Billywig"	1:31
4.	"The Demiguise and The Lollipop"	0:59
5.	"I'm Not Your Ma"	2:05
6.	"Blind Pig" (Written by J. K. Rowling, Mario Grigorov and performed by Emmi)	1:29
7.	"Newt Talks to Credence"	2:13
8.	"End Titles, Pt.2 (Fantastic Beasts and Where to Find Them)"	1:22
9.	"Kowalski Rag"	5:13
Total length:		98:00

== Charts ==
Chart (2016–17)	Peak position
Belgian Albums (Ultratop Flanders)	68
Belgian Albums (Ultratop Wallonia)	140
French Albums (SNEP)	161
US Billboard 200	192
