= Cedric Nicolas-Troyan =

French director and visual effects artist (born 1969)

- Born: Cedric Gabriel Fernand Nicolas; March 9, 1969 (age 57); Talence, Gironde, France
- Occupations: Visual effects artist, film director
- Years active: 1997–present

Cedric Nicolas-Troyan (born 9 March 1969) is a French visual effects artist and film director.

In 2013 he earned an Academy Award nomination for Best Visual Effects for his role as visual effects supervisor on Snow White and the Huntsman. He would go on to make his directorial debut for the film's sequel, The Huntsman: Winter's War.

== Filmography ==
Director

- Carrot vs Ninja (2011) (short film)
- The Huntsman: Winter's War (2016)
- Kate (2021)

Second Unit Director

- Snow White and the Huntsman (2012)
- Maleficent (2014)

Visual effects

- Assassin(s) (1997)
- Paparazzi (1998)
- The Wall (1998)
- One Hour Photo (2002)
- The Ring (2002)
- The Weather Man (2005)
- Pirates of the Caribbean: Dead Man's Chest (2006)
- Solstice (2008)
- Snow White and the Huntsman (2012)
- Maleficent (2014)
