= List of awards and nominations received by Halsey =

Halsey awards and nominations
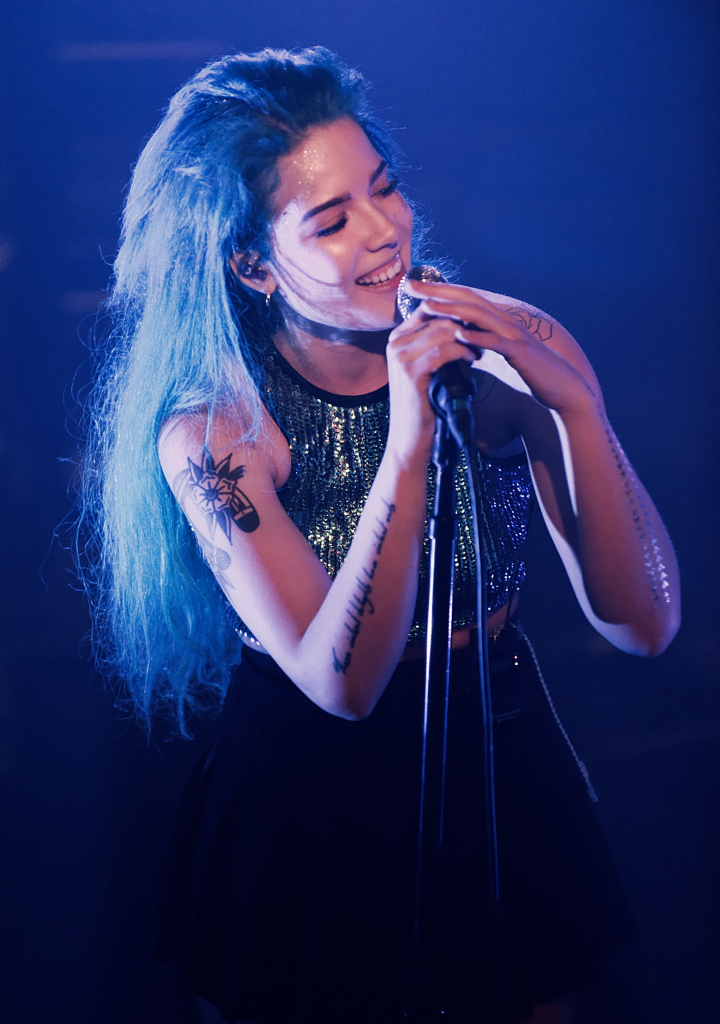
- Halsey performing in Los Angeles
Awards and nominations
Award	Wins	Nominations
American Music Awards	1	5
Billboard Music Awards	3	11
GLAAD Media Awards	2	2
Grammy Awards	0	3
MTV Europe Music Awards	2	6
MTV Video Music Awards	1	14
People's Choice Awards	0	3
Teen Choice Awards	2	8

Totals (Note: Certain award groups do not simply award one winner. They acknowledge several different recipients, have runners-up, and have third place. Since this is a specific recognition and is different from losing an award, runner-up mentions are considered wins in this award tally. For simplification and to avoid errors, each award in this list has been presumed to have had a prior nomination.)
- Wins: 40
- Nominations: 113

Halsey is an American singer and songwriter who has received numerous accolades throughout her career. Her recognitions include three Grammy Awards nominations, one American Music Award, three Billboard Music Awards, one MTV Video Music Award, and two MTV Europe Music Awards.

== Awards and nominations ==
Award	Year (Note: Indicates the year of ceremony. Each year is linked to the article about the awards held that year, wherever possible.)	Recipient(s) and nominee(s)	Category	Result	Ref.
American Music Awards	2017	"Closer" (with The Chainsmokers)	Favorite Pop/Rock Song	Nominated	
American Music Awards	2017	"Closer" (with The Chainsmokers)	Collaboration of the Year	Nominated	
American Music Awards	2019	Herself	Artist of the Year	Nominated	
American Music Awards	2019	"Without Me"	Best Music Video	Nominated	
American Music Awards	2019	"Without Me"	Favorite Pop/Rock Song	Won	
Berlin Music Video Awards	2025	"Safeword"	Most Trashy	Nominated	
Billboard Music Awards	2017	"Closer" (with The Chainsmokers)	Top Hot 100 Song	Won	
Billboard Music Awards	2017	"Closer" (with The Chainsmokers)	Top Selling Song	Nominated	
Billboard Music Awards	2017	"Closer" (with The Chainsmokers)	Top Radio Song	Nominated	
Billboard Music Awards	2017	"Closer" (with The Chainsmokers)	Top Streaming Song (Audio)	Nominated	
Billboard Music Awards	2017	"Closer" (with The Chainsmokers)	Top Streaming Song (Video)	Nominated	
Billboard Music Awards	2017	"Closer" (with The Chainsmokers)	Top Collaboration	Won	
Billboard Music Awards	2017	"Closer" (with The Chainsmokers)	Top Dance/Electronic Song	Won	
Billboard Music Awards	2018	Herself	Top Radio Songs Artist	Nominated	
Billboard Music Awards	2018	Herself	Top Female Artist	Nominated	
Billboard Music Awards	2019	Herself	Top Female Artist	Nominated	
Billboard Music Awards	2019	"Without Me"	Top Selling Song	Nominated	
Billboard Women in Music	2016	Herself	Rising Star	Won	
BMI Pop Awards	2017	"Closer" (with The Chainsmokers)	Award Winning Songs	Won	
BMI Pop Awards	2018	"Now or Never"	Award Winning Songs	Won	
BMI Pop Awards	2019	"Bad at Love"	Award Winning Songs	Won	
BMI Pop Awards	2019	"Him & I" (with G-Eazy)	Award Winning Songs	Won	
BMI Pop Awards	2020	"Eastside" (with Benny Blanco & Khalid)	Award Winning Songs	Won	
BMI Pop Awards	2020	"Without Me"	Award Winning Songs	Won	
BMI Pop Awards	2020	"Without Me"	Song of the Year	Won	
BMI Pop Awards	2021	Herself	Songwriter of the Year	Won	
BMI Pop Awards	2021	"Be Kind" (with Marshmello)	Award Winning Songs	Won	
BMI Pop Awards	2021	"Graveyard"	Award Winning Songs	Won	
BMI Pop Awards	2021	"Nightmare"	Award Winning Songs	Won	
BMI Pop Awards	2021	"You Should Be Sad"	Award Winning Songs	Won	
CMT Music Awards	2020	"Graveyard" (with Kelsea Ballerini)	CMT Performance of the Year	Nominated	
CMT Music Awards	2021	"The Other Girl" (with Kelsea Ballerini)	CMT Performance of the Year	Won	
Gaon Chart Music Awards	2020	"Boy with Luv" (with BTS)	Song of the Year – April	Nominated	
GLAAD Media Awards	2018	Herself	Outstanding Music Artist	Won	
GLAAD Media Awards	2021	Herself	Outstanding Music Artist	Nominated	
Global Awards	2019	Herself	Rising Star Award	Won	
Global Awards	2019	Herself	Best Female	Nominated	
Global Awards	2019	Herself	Social Media Superstar	Nominated	
Global Awards	2019	"Eastside" (with Benny Blanco & Khalid)	Best Song	Nominated	
Grammy Awards	2017	Purpose (as featured artist)	Album of the Year	Nominated	
Grammy Awards	2017	"Closer" (with The Chainsmokers)	Best Pop Duo/Group Performance	Nominated	
Grammy Awards	2022	If I Can't Have Love, I Want Power	Best Alternative Music Album	Nominated	
iHeartRadio Music Awards	2017	"Closer" (with The Chainsmokers)	Song of the Year	Nominated	
iHeartRadio Music Awards	2017	"Closer" (with The Chainsmokers)	Dance Song of the Year	Won	
iHeartRadio Music Awards	2017	"Closer" (with The Chainsmokers)	Best Collaboration	Nominated	
iHeartRadio Music Awards	2017	"Closer" (with The Chainsmokers)	Best Lyrics	Nominated	
iHeartRadio Music Awards	2018	Herself	Female Artist of the Year	Nominated	
iHeartRadio Music Awards	2019	Herself	Female Artist of the Year	Nominated	
iHeartRadio Music Awards	2019	Herself	Fangirls Award	Won	
iHeartRadio Music Awards	2019	"Without Me"	Best Lyrics	Nominated	
iHeartRadio Music Awards	2019	"Lucid Dreams"	Best Cover Song	Nominated	
iHeartRadio Music Awards	2020	Herself	Female Artist of the Year	Nominated	
iHeartRadio Music Awards	2020	"Boy with Luv" (with BTS)	Best Music Video	Won	
iHeartRadio Music Awards	2020	Best Lyrics	"Nightmare"	Nominated	
iHeartRadio Music Awards	2020	"Without Me" (featuring Juice Wrld)	Best Remix	Nominated	
iHeartRadio MMVAs	2018	"Bad at Love"	Video of the Year	Nominated	
iHeartRadio MMVAs	2018	Herself	Best Pop Artist or Group	Nominated	
iHeartRadio MMVAs	2018	Herself	Fan Fave Artist	Nominated	
iHeartRadio Titanium Award	2018	"Bad at Love"	1 Billion Total Audience Spins on iHeartRadio Stations	Won	
iHeartRadio Titanium Award	2018	"Him & I" (with G-Eazy)	1 Billion Total Audience Spins on iHeartRadio Stations	Won	
iHeartRadio Titanium Award	2019	"Without Me"	1 Billion Total Audience Spins on iHeartRadio Stations	Won	
iHeartRadio Titanium Award	2019	"Eastside" (with Benny Blanco & Khalid)	1 Billion Total Audience Spins on iHeartRadio Stations	Won	
Meus Prêmios Nick	2019	"Boy with Luv" (with BTS)	Favorite International Hit	Won	
MTV Europe Music Awards	2015	Herself	Artist on the Rise	Nominated	
MTV Europe Music Awards	2016	Herself	Best Push Act	Nominated	
MTV Europe Music Awards	2019	Herself	Best Pop	Won	
MTV Europe Music Awards	2019	Herself	Best Look	Won	
MTV Europe Music Awards	2019	"Boy with Luv" (with BTS)	Best Collaboration	Nominated	
MTV Europe Music Awards	2021	Herself	Best Alternative	Nominated	
MTV Italian Music Awards	2017	"Closer" (with The Chainsmokers)	Best Video	Won	
MTV Millennial Awards	2019	"Without Me"	Global Hit	Nominated	
MTV Millennial Awards Brazil	2019	"Without Me"	Global Hit	Nominated	
MTV Video Music Awards	2016	"Closer" (with The Chainsmokers)	Song of Summer	Nominated	
MTV Video Music Awards	2017	"Closer" (with The Chainsmokers)	Best Collaboration	Nominated	
MTV Video Music Awards	2017	"Closer" (with The Chainsmokers)	Best Editing	Nominated	
MTV Video Music Awards	2017	"Now or Never"	Best Cinematography	Nominated	
MTV Video Music Awards	2019	Herself	Artist of the Year	Nominated	
MTV Video Music Awards	2019	"Boy with Luv" (with BTS)	Best Collaboration	Nominated	
MTV Video Music Awards	2019	"Boy with Luv" (with BTS)	Best K-Pop	Won	
MTV Video Music Awards	2019	"Boy with Luv" (with BTS)	Best Art Direction	Nominated	
MTV Video Music Awards	2019	"Boy with Luv" (with BTS)	Best Choreography	Nominated	
MTV Video Music Awards	2019	"Nightmare"	Video for Good	Nominated	
MTV Video Music Awards	2019	"Nightmare"	Best Power Anthem	Nominated	
MTV Video Music Awards	2020	"You Should Be Sad"	Best Pop	Nominated	
MTV Video Music Awards	2020	"Graveyard"	Best Editing	Nominated	
MTV Video Music Awards	2021	"Be Kind" (with Marshmello)	Best Choreography	Nominated	
Myx Music Awards	2017	"Closer" (with The Chainsmokers)	Favorite International Video	Won	
Myx Music Awards	2020	"Boy with Luv" (with BTS)	Favorite International Video	Won	
Nickelodeon Kids' Choice Awards	2021	"Be Kind" (with Marshmello)	Favorite Music Collaboration	Nominated	
Nickelodeon Kids' Choice Awards	2023	"Stay with Me" (with Calvin Harris, Justin Timberlake & Pharrell Williams)	Favorite Music Collaboration	Nominated	
NME Awards	2016	Herself	Best New Artist	Nominated	
NME Awards	2020	"Boy with Luv" (with BTS)	Best Collaboration	Nominated	
NME Awards	2022	Herself	Innovation Award	Won	
NME Awards	2022	If I Can't Have Love, I Want Power	Best Album in the World	Nominated	
NME Awards	2022	If I Can't Have Love, I Want Power	Best Music Film	Nominated	
People's Choice Awards	2016	Herself	Favorite Breakout Artist	Nominated	
People's Choice Awards	2019	"Boy with Luv" (with BTS)	Music Video of 2019	Nominated	
People's Choice Awards	2020	"Be Kind" (with Marshmello)	Collaboration Song of the Year	Nominated	
Radio Disney Music Awards	2017	"Closer" (with The Chainsmokers)	Song of the Year	Nominated	
Radio Disney Music Awards	2017	"Closer" (with The Chainsmokers)	Best Song To Lyp Sync To	Nominated	
Radio Disney Music Awards	2018	Herself	Breakout Artist of the Year	Nominated	
RTHK International Pop Poll Awards	2017	"Closer" (with The Chainsmokers)	Top Ten International Gold Songs	Won	
RTHK International Pop Poll Awards	2020	"Boy with Luv" (with BTS)	Top Ten International Gold Songs	Won	
Songwriters Hall of Fame	2019	Herself	Hal David Starlight Award	Won	
Teen Choice Awards	2017	"Closer" (with The Chainsmokers)	Choice Pop Song	Nominated	
Teen Choice Awards	2017	Herself	Choice Breakout Artist	Nominated	
Teen Choice Awards	2017	Herself	Choice Summer Female Artist	Nominated	
Teen Choice Awards	2018	"Bad at Love"	Choice Song: Female Artist	Nominated	
Teen Choice Awards	2019	"Nightmare"	Choice Song: Female Artist	Nominated	
Teen Choice Awards	2019	"Boy with Luv" (with BTS)	Choice Collaboration	Won	
Teen Choice Awards	2019	Herself	Choice Female Artist	Nominated	
Teen Choice Awards	2019	Herself	Choice Summer Female Artist	Won	
Telehit Awards	2019	"Boy with Luv" (with BTS)	People's Best Video	Nominated	
