= Love and Power Tour =

2022 concert tour by Halsey

- Tour by Halsey
- Location: Asia; Europe; North America; South America
- Associated album: If I Can't Have Love, I Want Power
- Start date: May 17, 2022
- End date: November 4, 2023
- Legs: 6
- No. of shows: 38
- Supporting acts: Beabadoobee; PinkPantheress; The Marías; Abby Roberts; Wolf Alice; Cannons; Remi Wolf

Halsey concert chronology
- Manic World Tour (2020); Love and Power Tour (2022–2023); For My Last Trick: The Tour (2025)

The Love and Power Tour was the fourth headlining concert tour by American singer Halsey, in support of her (Note: Halsey uses both she/her and they/them pronouns and switches between them; this article uses she/her pronouns for consistency.) fourth studio album, If I Can't Have Love, I Want Power (2021). The tour began in West Palm Beach on May 17, 2022, and concluded in São Paulo on November 4, 2023. Halsey announced the tour on January 31, 2022.

== Background ==
During the first leg of the Manic World Tour in March 2020, Halsey announced that due to the state of the pandemic and international lockdowns, the tour would be pushed back a year and that all tickets would still be valid at the same venues in 2021. In January of that year, Halsey had announced that she would be officially cancelling the rest of the tour for the safety of her team and fans. Days later, Halsey announced she was pregnant with her first child, who was born in July 2021. While initially on the Manic World Tour, Halsey originally stated it would be her last tour for "a very long time". Upon the announcement of the Love and Power Tour, Halsey stated, "it's been far too long and I could not be more excited to see you all."

The tour was supported by four openers: Beabadoobee & PinkPantheress for the first half of the tour and The Marías & Abby Roberts for the second half. Wolf Alice was featured as support for the Los Angeles show. The Gulf Shores, New York City, and Milwaukee shows were part of various music festivals.

== Setlist ==
This is the setlist from the show on May 27, 2022, in Charlotte. It is not intended to represent all dates of the tour.

1. "The Tradition"
2. "Castle"
3. "Easier Than Lying"
4. "You Should Be Sad"
5. "1121" / "Die for Me"
6. "Graveyard"
7. "Colors"
8. "Hurricane"
9. "Lilith"
10. "The Lighthouse"
11. "Killing Boys"
12. "Girl Is a Gun"
13. "Be Kind"
14. "More"
15. "Darling"
16. "Honey"
17. "3AM"
18. "Bad at Love"
19. "You Asked for This"
20. "Whispers"
21. "Gasoline"
22. "Nightmare"
23. "Experiment on Me"
24. "Without Me"
25. "I Am Not a Woman, I'm a God"

=== Notes ===
- During the show in Gulf Shores, "Nightmare" was performed twice. "The Tradition", "Lilith", "Killing Boys", "Girl Is a Gun", "More", "Darling", "You Asked For This", "Whispers", "Experiment on Me" and "I Am Not a Woman, I'm a God" were not performed.
- During the show in Charlotte, "You Asked For This" was replaced with a snippet of "Clementine".
- During the show in Toronto, "Experiment on Me" was not performed.
- Starting with the show in New York City, "So Good" and a cover of Kate Bush's "Running Up That Hill" were added to the set list replacing "Hold Me Down" and "Heaven in Hiding". "The Tradition", "Colors", "Lilith", "Killing Boys", "Be Kind", "100 Letters", "Darling", & "Experiment on Me" were not performed.

== Tour dates ==
List of 2022 concerts, showing date, city, country, venue, opening acts, tickets sold, number of available tickets and amount of gross revenue
Date	City	Country	Venue	Opening act(s)	Attendance	Revenue
May 17, 2022	West Palm Beach	United States	iTHINK Financial Amphitheatre	Beabadoobee; PinkPantheress	7,547 / 13,097	$396,759
May 19, 2022	Tampa	United States	MidFlorida Credit Union Amphitheatre	Beabadoobee; PinkPantheress	11,556 / 14,917	$635,921
May 21, 2022 (Note: This concert was part of the Hangout Music Festival.)	Gulf Shores	United States	Gulf Shores Beach	—	—	—
May 24, 2022	Franklin	United States	FirstBank Amphitheater	Beabadoobee; PinkPantheress	5,768 / 6,110	$510,882
May 25, 2022	Rogers	United States	Walmart Arkansas Music Pavilion	Beabadoobee; PinkPantheress	7,811 / 9,618	$341,284
May 27, 2022	Charlotte	United States	PNC Music Pavilion	Beabadoobee; PinkPantheress	11,427 / 16,409	$596,852
May 29, 2022	Clarkston	United States	Pine Knob Music Theatre	Beabadoobee; PinkPantheress	13,429 / 14,446	$594,949
June 1, 2022	Mansfield	United States	Xfinity Center	Beabadoobee; PinkPantheress	12,598 / 17,140	$783,836
June 3, 2022	Cuyahoga Falls	United States	Blossom Music Center	Beabadoobee	13,868 / 17,691	$545,748
June 5, 2022	Toronto	Canada	Budweiser Stage	Beabadoobee	14,251 / 15,587	$554,179
June 11, 2022 (Note: This concert was part of the Governors Ball Music Festival.)	New York City	United States	Citi Field	—	—	—
June 15, 2022	Nampa	United States	Ford Amphitheater	The Marías; Abby Roberts	6,976 / 7,500	$268,376
June 16, 2022	Auburn	United States	White River Amphitheatre	The Marías; Abby Roberts	9,806 / 12,500	$533,080
June 18, 2022	Ridgefield	United States	RV Inn Style Resorts Amphitheater	The Marías; Abby Roberts	11,234 / 13,500	$547,120
June 21, 2022	Los Angeles	United States	Hollywood Bowl	Wolf Alice; Abby Roberts	14,607 / 15,311	$1,225,330
June 24, 2022	Mountain View	United States	Shoreline Amphitheatre	The Marías; Abby Roberts	13,201 / 17,500	$657,005
June 26, 2022	Phoenix	United States	Ak-Chin Pavilion	The Marías; Abby Roberts	12,350 / 13,500	$590,360
June 28, 2022	Dallas	United States	Dos Equis Pavilion	The Marías; Abby Roberts	15,195 / 16,556	$768,439
June 30, 2022	Atlanta	United States	Cellairis Amphitheatre	The Marías; Abby Roberts	9,371 / 13,255	$458,467
July 2, 2022 (Note: This concert was part of Summerfest.)	Milwaukee	United States	American Family Insurance Amphitheater	The Marías; Abby Roberts	11,496 / 16,501	$534,207
July 3, 2022	Tinley Park	United States	Hollywood Casino Amphitheatre	The Marías; Abby Roberts	13,210 / 18,000	$723,619
July 6, 2022	Morrison	United States	Red Rocks Amphitheatre	The Marías; Abby Roberts	18,390 / 18,390	$1,789,679
July 7, 2022	Morrison	United States	Red Rocks Amphitheatre	The Marías; Abby Roberts	18,390 / 18,390	$1,789,679
July 9, 2022	Irvine	United States	FivePoint Amphitheatre	The Marías; Abby Roberts	10,614 / 10,614	$752,117
July 11, 2022 (Note: This concert was part of Festival d'été de Québec.)	Quebec City	Canada	Plains of Abraham	Cannons; Remi Wolf	—	—
July 31, 2022 (Note: This concert was part of Fuji Rock Festival.)	Naeba	Japan	Naeba Ski Resort	—	—	—
August 20, 2022 (Note: This concert was part of Live Music Festival.)	Kraków	Poland	Muzeum Lotnictwa Polskiego	—	—	—
August 26, 2022 (Note: This concert was part of Leeds Festival.)	Leeds	England	Bramham Park	—	—	—
August 28, 2022 (Note: This concert was part of Reading Festival.)	Reading	England	Little John's Farm	—	—	—
September 3, 2022	Istanbul	Turkey	KüçükÇiftlik Park	—	18,000 / 18,000	$780,024
September 22, 2022 (Note: This concert was part of Firefly Music Festival.)	Dover	United States	Dover International Speedway	—	—	—
September 24, 2022 (Note: This concert was part of iHeartRadio Music Festival.)	Las Vegas	United States	T-Mobile Arena	—	—	—

List of 2023 concerts, showing date, city, country, venue, opening acts, tickets sold, number of available tickets and amount of gross revenue
Date	City	Country	Venue	Opening act(s)	Attendance	Revenue
June 21, 2023	Newark	United States	NJPAC			
June 22, 2023	Newark	United States	NJPAC			
June 24, 2023	Hollywood	United States	Hard Rock Live			
June 30, 2023	Gary	United States	Hard Rock Casino Northern Indiana			
July 2, 2023	Wheatland	United States	Hard Rock Live Sacramento			
November 4, 2023 (Note: This concert was part of GPWeek Festival.)	São Paulo	Brazil	Allianz Parque	—	—	—
Total					262,523 / 316,126 (83%)	$14,591,092

=== Cancelled shows ===
List of cancelled concerts
Date	City	Country	Venue	Reason	Ref.
June 8, 2022	Columbia	United States	Merriweather Post Pavilion	Severe weather and venue flooding	
