= Manic World Tour =

2020 concert tour by Halsey

- Tour by Halsey
- Location: Europe
- Associated album: Manic
- Start date: February 6, 2020
- End date: March 12, 2020
- Legs: 1
- No. of shows: 17

Halsey concert chronology
- Hopeless Fountain Kingdom Tour (2017–2018); Manic World Tour (2020); Love and Power Tour (2022–2023)

The Manic World Tour was the third headlining concert tour by American singer Halsey, in support of her (Note: Halsey uses both she/her and they/them pronouns and switches between them; this article uses she/her pronouns for consistency.) third studio album, Manic (2020). The tour started in Madrid, Spain on February 6, 2020, and ended in Manchester, England on March 12, 2020, before the COVID-19 pandemic ended the tour abruptly before summer North American and May eastern Asia dates could be played. Originally, Halsey said it would be her last tour for "a very long time". The North American leg was originally scheduled to take place in summer 2020, but due to the pandemic, Halsey later announced that she had rescheduled the North American leg to summer 2021.

On January 22, 2021, Halsey announced the remainder of the tour was cancelled, due to continued uncertainty over the pandemic, days before the announcement for her pregnancy.

== Set list ==
This set list is from the show on February 9, 2020, in Frankfurt. It is not intended to represent all concerts for the tour.

1. "Nightmare"
2. "Castle"
3. "Heaven In Hiding"
4. "Eyes Closed" / "Die for Me"
5. "You Should Be Sad"
6. "Haunting"
7. "Forever... (is a Long Time)"
8. "Dominic's Interlude"
9. "I Hate Everybody"
10. "Colors pt. II"
11. "Colors"
12. "Walls Could Talk"
13. "Bad At Love"
14. "3AM"
15. "Finally // Beautiful Stranger"
16. "100 Letters" (acoustic)
17. "Is There Somewhere"
18. "Killing Boys"
19. "Hold Me Down"
20. "Clementine"
21. "Graveyard"
22. "929"

Encore

23. "Ashley"
24. "Gasoline"
25. "Without Me"

=== Notes ===
- Starting on March 7, "Experiment On Me" was added to the set list.

== Tour dates ==
List of 2020 concerts
Date	City	Country	Venue	Attendance	Revenue
February 6, 2020	Madrid	Spain	WiZink Center	4,053 / 6,140	$256,769
February 7, 2020	Barcelona	Spain	Sant Jordi Club	3,519 / 3,660	$199,175
February 9, 2020	Frankfurt	Germany	Jahrhunderthalle	4,672 / 4,672	$209,776
February 13, 2020	Milan	Italy	Mediolanum Forum	5,726 / 6,581	$269,013
February 15, 2020	Amsterdam	Netherlands	Ziggo Dome	8,767 / 13,085	$410,354
February 17, 2020	Paris	France	Dôme de Paris	4,135 / 4,135	$248,348
February 21, 2020	Oslo	Norway	Oslo Spektrum	—	—
February 22, 2020	Copenhagen	Denmark	Royal Arena	3,933 / 16,387	$238,477
February 26, 2020	Helsinki	Finland	Helsinki Ice Hall	4,876 / 5,875	$295,976
February 28, 2020	Berlin	Germany	Verti Music Hall	4,244 / 4,244	$186,023
February 29, 2020	Munich	Germany	Kulturhalle Zenith	5,820 / 5,820	$258,827
March 4, 2020	Esch-sur-Alzette	Luxembourg	Rockhal	3,023 / 6,500	$146,767
March 5, 2020	Antwerp	Belgium	Lotto Arena	5,135 / 5,135	$202,666
March 7, 2020	Glasgow	Scotland	SSE Hydro	7,967 / 9,157	$335,121
March 8, 2020	London	England	The O_{2} Arena	15,310 / 15,603	$435,212
March 10, 2020	Dublin	Ireland	3Arena	7,657 / 8,903	$397,878
March 12, 2020	Manchester	England	Manchester Arena	9,939 / 10,687	$409,780
Total				98,776 / 126,584 (78%)	$4,500,162

=== Cancelled shows ===
Date	City	Country	Venue	Reason
February 24, 2020	Stockholm	Sweden	Annexet	Production issues
March 2, 2020	Zürich	Switzerland	Samsung Hall	COVID-19 pandemic
May 7, 2020	Tokyo	Japan	Tokyo Garden Theatre	COVID-19 pandemic
May 9, 2020	Seoul	South Korea	Olympic Hall	COVID-19 pandemic
July 10, 2020	Quebec City (Note: This concert would've been part of Festival d'été de Québec.)	Canada	The Bell Stage	COVID-19 pandemic
June 1, 2021	Auburn	United States	White River Amphitheatre	COVID-19 pandemic
June 3, 2021	Ridgefield	United States	Sunlight Supply Amphitheater	COVID-19 pandemic
June 5, 2021	Mountain View	United States	Shoreline Amphitheatre	COVID-19 pandemic
June 9, 2021	Los Angeles	United States	Hollywood Bowl	COVID-19 pandemic
June 10, 2021	Sacramento	United States	Golden 1 Center	COVID-19 pandemic
June 12, 2021	Phoenix	United States	Ak-Chin Pavilion	COVID-19 pandemic
June 15, 2021	Dallas	United States	Dos Equis Pavilion	COVID-19 pandemic
June 16, 2021	The Woodlands	United States	Cynthia Woods Mitchell Pavilion	COVID-19 pandemic
June 18, 2021	Atlanta	United States	Cellairis Amphitheatre	COVID-19 pandemic
June 19, 2021	Charlotte	United States	PNC Music Pavilion	COVID-19 pandemic
June 23, 2021	Cuyahoga Falls	United States	Blossom Music Center	COVID-19 pandemic
June 25, 2021	Clarkston	United States	DTE Energy Music Theatre	COVID-19 pandemic
June 26, 2021	Tinley Park	United States	Hollywood Casino Amphitheatre	COVID-19 pandemic
June 29, 2021	Saint Paul	United States	Xcel Energy Center	COVID-19 pandemic
July 1, 2021	Kansas City	United States	T-Mobile Center	COVID-19 pandemic
July 3, 2021 (Note: This concert would've been part of Summerfest.)	Milwaukee	United States	American Family Insurance Amphitheater	COVID-19 pandemic
July 7, 2021	Toronto	Canada	Budweiser Stage	COVID-19 pandemic
July 11, 2021	Holmdel Township	United States	PNC Bank Arts Center	COVID-19 pandemic
July 13, 2021	Columbia	United States	Merriweather Post Pavilion	COVID-19 pandemic
July 14, 2021	Mansfield	United States	Xfinity Center	COVID-19 pandemic
July 16, 2021	New York City	United States	Forest Hills Stadium	COVID-19 pandemic
July 17, 2021	New York City	United States	Forest Hills Stadium	COVID-19 pandemic
July 20, 2021	Indianapolis	United States	Bankers Life Fieldhouse	COVID-19 pandemic
July 22, 2021	Tampa	United States	MidFlorida Credit Union Amphitheatre	COVID-19 pandemic
July 24, 2021	Nashville	United States	Bridgestone Arena	COVID-19 pandemic
July 25, 2021	Maryland Heights	United States	Hollywood Casino Amphitheatre	COVID-19 pandemic
July 26, 2021	Morrison	United States	Red Rocks Amphitheatre	COVID-19 pandemic
July 27, 2021	Morrison	United States	Red Rocks Amphitheatre	COVID-19 pandemic
July 29, 2021	West Valley City	United States	USANA Amphitheatre	COVID-19 pandemic
July 31, 2021	Irvine	United States	FivePoint Amphitheatre	COVID-19 pandemic
