= If I Can't Have Love, I Want Power (film) =

2021 film directed by Colin Tilley

- Poster
- Directed by: Colin Tilley
- Written by: Halsey
- Produced by: Jamee Ranta
- Starring: Halsey; Sasha Lane; Vuk Čelebić; Brian Caspe; Marie Kadeřábková
- Cinematography: Elias Talbot
- Edited by: Vinnie Hobbs
- Production company: Capitol Records
- Distributed by: Universal Music Group; HBO Max
- Release date: August 25, 2021 (United States)
- Running time: 53 minutes
- Country: United States
- Language: English
- Box office: $1 million

If I Can't Have Love, I Want Power is a 2021 American period fantasy horror film directed by Colin Tilley and produced by Jamee Ranta. Serving as a visual companion to American singer-songwriter Halsey's fourth studio album of the same name, the film stars herself in the lead in dual roles as Queen Lila, a young pregnant queen and Lilith, her look-alike. She was also credited as the writer of the film. (Note: Halsey's pronouns are she/her and they/them. This article uses she/her pronouns for consistency.) Also starring in the film are Sasha Lane, Vuk Čelebić, Brian Caspe and Marie Kadeřábková. The film explores themes of motherhood, misogyny, gender, through the elements of historic royalty and mysticism.

Halsey attempted to create a visual album since her first studio album Badlands (2015) but she did not have the financial backup to do so. She met Tilley in December 2020, regarding a horror film based on motherhood and draws visual influences from historical fiction, such as the television series Game of Thrones (2011–2019) and the film Marie Antoinette (2006). The film was shot for 16 days at Prague in March 2021, adhering to the safety restrictions to prevent COVID-19 pandemic. The team did several practical effects for her costumes and wardrobe as Halsey was six months pregnant at that time of filming. Elias Talbot shot the film, while Vinnie Hobbs supervised editing.

If I Can't Have Love, I Want Power was screened at select IMAX theatres in United States on August 25, 2021, and internationally on August 26, to promote the album's release. The film received generally positive reviews from critics, with praise for the direction, story, visuals, costume design, production values, aesthetics and themes of motherhood and fantasy. After its theatrical premiere, the film was screened at HBO Max on October 7, 2021. The film received nomination for Best Music Film at the NME Awards 2022.

== Plot ==
Lila, a young queen, returns to her castle and finds that the king is dead. She then stares into a mirror and finds that her reflection is a separate entity, Lilith, and dashes out to the balcony after Lilith unsettles the court members. The court members discuss what to do with Lila while revisiting a family tree. The film then cuts to Lila being prepared to take the king's duties as she sits on her throne; bored and a bit vainglorious, she abandons this and walks out to the balcony again and witnesses a strange fiery light. The kingdom then gathers to mourn the king's death, while Lila felt contented about it. She then shows a bruise to the Matriarch and the Aristocrat, revealing that he physically assaulted her, in order to explain her contentment.

That night, Lilith comes forth from the mirror and stabs a sleeping Lila in the stomach. Awakening from a nightmare, Lila rushes to pull out seeds from a drawer and urinate on them to test if she is pregnant. She looks in the mirror, seeing Lilith's hands rubbing her stomach, and grows unsettled. She then decides to go to a bathhouse to relax, but she flees in terror as her reflection continues to show Lilith creepily rubbing her stomach.

To celebrate the king's death, Lila gathers her friends for a day out, becomes drunk and causes mayhem in the villages. She then tries to ride back to the castle before falling off her horse, and it runs away. A drunk Lila lonely wanders into the forest, and stumbles upon a witch's cabin. The witch feels her stomach and begins teaching Lila a lamaze technique causing her to become frightened and run away, eventually finding her way back to the castle. Upon stumbling back to the bedroom, she found that the seeds she urinated on earlier had sprouted, upsetting her, as it means she is pregnant.

The Aristocrat, fed up with Lila's selfish attitude, claims that given Lila is not of royal blood, she is a common widow and should not retain her title as Queen, especially considering what happened while she was drunk. Lila is sentenced to be executed after her child is born; if the child is a boy, it will be raised in the court, but if it is a girl, it will also be killed. An enraged Lila walks out to the lake to drown herself and her child, but as she felt it kicking her stomach, she changes her mind and swims through the lake to flee from the castle, trying to find the Witch's cabin to give birth in a more safe area, as her water breaks. A maid then tells the Aristocrat that she witnessed Lila running away.

Lila flashes back to the night the king died, revealing that she had poisoned his wine and he raped and impregnated her, and the king collapsed to death just after that incident; the rape resulted in Lila's pregnancy. The Aristocrat find Lila after she gives birth with the help of the witch. They burn down the cabin, presumably killing the witch, and throw Lila and her child onto a wagon back to the castle. She then wakes in a cell, which has been unlocked by an unknown person and finds out that all the guards are dead. She then makes her way to the nursery and the maids are frightened when she finds her baby. She carries the baby with her to the guillotine and gives it to the maid. She then thinks what would have been if she had been more loving and imagines a peaceful life with her child. Smiling at the thought of it, she is abruptly beheaded.

Lilith escapes from the mirror again. She wanders around the castle and looks over the dead bodies of the guards and Aristocrat, which she presumably killed. She picks up the crown that formerly belonged to Lila and observes it, before leaving the palace.

== Cast ==
- Halsey as Queen Lila and Lilith
- Sasha Lane as The Witch
- Vuk Čelebić as The King
- Brian Caspe as The Aristocrat
- Marie Kadeřábková as The Matriarch

== Production ==
=== Development and pre-production ===
If I Can't Have Love, I Want Power is the visual companion film to her eponymous fourth studio album. She initially planned for a visual album ever since her debut album Badlands (2015), but could not do so due to the lack of financial resources she needed for. Her planned fourth record felt like a perfect album and film, where she was also method acting her album, and called it as "super douche-y" but also "cool to make a record in tandem" as she felt it coherent and cohesive the entire time. The film is directed by American filmmaker Colin Tilley who previously directed Halsey's music videos for "Without Me" and "You Should Be Sad" (2020) and Jamee Ranta served as the producer of the film.

In December 2020, Halsey approached Tilley on a horror film inspired by impending motherhood, and drawing visual influences from the film Marie Antoinette (2006), the play Queen Anne and 17th century folktales. She further had a storyboard to develop the structure of the film. Tilley further worked with Halsey on the storyline as she was writing the script as well as the film's music, which Tilley did not hear any of them. He felt questioned on how he could tell a story for a silent film without the conceptualisation of the full songs, which was considered as an interesting process. However, he knew the lyrics and intentions of each song Halsey was writing.

He further read the story as an interesting take on motherhood and the perception of the society. However, Halsey took her current concept into a periodic timeline happening in the 14th and 15th century. Though no changes had been made, it was instead became "more extreme" as the concept became a modern-day horror film in that sense. Tilley added that "being pregnant at that time was horrifying, for so many reasons, and that's what we were leaning into telling here". Ranta also acknowledged Halsey's intention to set the story in a medieval period.

=== Location scouting ===
The location scouting was held in Romania, Croatia, France, England and Ukraine, while Ranta researched and reached to production companies and associates she had worked before, but felt the Czech Republic had a strong production base which intended them to shoot the film in Prague. Furthermore, Ranta enjoyed filming in overseas, as there was a structure on how they run their sets and she liked the variety of personalities and roles and the way they approach things comparing to Hollywood productions.

Once the team had access to the Czech Republic, the crew went on an intense pre-production techniques, which had been done within three weeks. Since Halsey was five months pregnant, she had time restrictions on how many hours she should work in a day, hence they had to fill up the rest of the shoot days with reaction shots and things, during Halsey's absence, and they also had a body double for shooting behind, over-the-shoulder shots and stunts.

=== Filming ===
If I Can't Have Love, I Want Power was shot at Prague in March 2021. The team had to adhere to the safety regulations due to the COVID-19 pandemic, where out of 200 crew members, no one were being allowed in set without negative test result. The government had imposed ban on gatherings of more than two people to prevent COVID-19 spread. Hence, they had to acquire special permissions to film inside 11th-century castles, especially at the Křivoklát Castle and shooting on roads. During the time of shoot, Halsey was five months pregnant and in her second trimester. Therefore, the team faced several challenges on wardrobe and framing, as there are scenes where Lila was not depicted as pregnant as the film's timeline spans over nine months.

Due to the final months of winter season in Prague, the extremely cold climate became a challenge for the film crew. Tilley however was impressed on Halsey's efforts on filming each single day. He had to change the ways he shot the film, recalling that he would have two hours blocked to shoot a scene the way he had carried out, but due to the weather condition, he could not have her on set for a longer time. Having 15 minutes to shoot that sequence, he had to flip the way he approached filming that particular sequence, which had worked out as far as some of these longer takes and choices he made as far as the way he blocked out the camera.

Tilley and Ranta cited the scene where Halsey riding horseback through the woods after a drunken day with friends, as a "logistical headache". He admitted that there was lot of film magic went into it, which was part of the process. But it ended up to their advantage, as he liked the way the sequence has been conceptualised from Halsey's perspective in a "really intimate way". Filming was completed within 16 days.

=== Costume design and make-up ===
Halsey's own beauty line About-Face was used for her makeup. American stylist Law Roach had designed Halsey's costumes, who had been introduced by her hairstylist Martin-Christopher Harper. As a woman who feels powerful, but also in a desperation, Roach wanted to build her life throughout clothing and show the character's duality. At first, he had planned for six looks in the film, but expanded much bigger. Despite being a period drama, he was not limited to replicate the look of specific era, and spanned over various timelines ranging from 1600s to 1800s. Due to the tight schedule, Roach did not preview the final songs while working on the film.

Roach's team created several wardrobe that matched Halsey's mood. Instead of renting costumes from archival houses, he focused on the works of Vivienne Westwood and John Galliano, which contains nod to classical reference points and designed modern clothes to look vintage. In the sequence where Halsey goes with her friends for a day out, she wears Westwood's teal and maroon gown earlier used in Vogue's 1996 spring and summer campaign and the pink dress in the dream sequence, is a custom creation from Westwood's team. The costumers had to pay attention to the way the costumes and materials are cut and angled for each time period and stage of pregnancy. Other costumes include the sculpted black couture gown designed by Stéphane Rolland and warrior corsets decked in gold, jeweled tassels and miniature portraits.

The team had several practical effects, especially in her clothing and wardrobe where they had to include different pregnancy stuffing in her clothes, as her main stylist had made hiding Halsey's belly with some of these wardrobe pieces, which was extremely helpful for the crew, as although they manage for practical effects in post-production to make her not to look pregnant, they wanted to make it feel as possible on set.

=== Cinematography ===
Elias Talbot cinematographed the music video using Arri Alexa 65 camera for the film. Ranta felt that the amount of information that IMAX cameras take in is unreal, and hence while shooting in castles from the 1100s and larger sequences with huge people the quality is much higher than standard camera. While doing some of the intimate scenes, filming in IMAX gives an intricate information and detailing to make it more intimate and vulnerable. Ranta recalled her conversation with Halsey, that though doing a close up shot, while shooting in a larger screen, she asked her to make sure that "she would sell every centimeter of her face while expressing different emotions".

She recalled that filming in IMAX was a different experience compared to typical formats, as the video might be compatible to the internet or cellphones, even though they shot them in 4K resolutions. After filming, the camera team went to the IMAX theatre in Marina del Rey, California for reviewing the tests. They further tested the lighting, frame rates, camera and exposure as well as the depth of field in the environment as in IMAX cameras, the focus is hyper-sensitive and needed to be perfect for a large format to tell the story appropriately.

== Marketing and release ==
The first trailer to the film was posted by Halsey across her social media platforms on July 13, 2021. Claire Shaffer of Rolling Stone reported that the film incorporates fantasy alongside themes of motherhood and mysticism. Shaffer also indicated the visual influences from the television series Game of Thrones (2011–2019) and Marie Antoinette, being drawn for the film. On July 29, 2021, the second trailer for the film titled "woman/god trailer" soundtracked with "I Am Not a Woman, I'm a God", the eleventh track in the album, was released. It was preceded by four music videos connected to the film for its promotions. A third and final trailer was released on August 24, 2021. The film received an R-rating due to graphic nudity, sexual content, violence and language.

In July 2021, Halsey announced the list of cities for the film's premiere. Distributed by Universal Music Group, on behalf of Halsey's Capitol Records (UMG's subsidiary label), If I Can't Have Love, I Want Power was screened in selected theatres in US on August 25, 2021, and internationally on August 26, ahead of the album release on August 27. Tickets for the film went for sale on August 3. By the end of August 29, the film grossed over $735,000 worldwide from selected locations and showtimes, with a screen average of $5,000 from 100 IMAX auditoriums throughout United States and Canada and was sold out in 70 theatres out of 122, in US and international markets, especially in the territories of Russia, Argentina, Brazil, Mexico and the United Kingdom. Two shows were held at London's BFI IMAX theatre for full capacity, for the first time since December 2019, and encore presentations were held in places where there were sellouts. The highest was at the TCL Chinese Theatre in Los Angeles, where it recorded a gross of $24,000. As of October 2021, the film grossed over $1 million in limited release.

== Reception ==
=== Critical response ===
On the review aggregator website Rotten Tomatoes, 100% of 5 critics' reviews are positive.

Larisha Paul of Billboard commented that the film "distinctly an accompanying film experience" rather than a "complete visual album". She further added that "rather than the scenes being structured as a progression of music videos, the music of the album lends itself as an emotion-evoking guide." Ciaran Brennan of Hot Press reviewed "If I Can't Have Love I Want Power is an excellent example of why Halsey is one of the frontrunners in pop music at the moment. Their ability to speak candidly and creatively about gender dysphoria, miscarriage, motherhood and femininity – and Halsey's stratospheric success – has made it clear that pop music is finished with clandestine, perfectly packaged superstars that cater to the patriarchal gaze. Rather, pop is finally starting to crave brutal honesty and raw creativity in its artists."

=== Accolades ===
At the NME Awards 2022, If I Can't Have Love, I Want Power was nominated for Best Music Film, which was lost to The Sparks Brothers (2021).

== Home media ==
If I Can't Have Love, I Want Power was released on HBO Max on October 7, 2021. To celebrate the album's one-year anniversary, Halsey released a collector's edition Blu-ray of the film, that comes with the CD of the album. It was enclosed in a clothbound black slipcase, which also accompanies a 64-page booklet that contains production stills, behind-the-scenes photos and artwork by Halsey.
