= I Am Not a Woman, I'm a God =

- Remix EP cover art

Single by Halsey

from the album If I Can't Have Love, I Want Power
- Released: August 31, 2021
- Genre: Alternative pop; synth-pop
- Length: 2:56
- Label: Capitol
- Composers: Trent Reznor; Atticus Ross; Johnathan Cunningham
- Lyricists: Ashley Frangipane; Trent Reznor
- Producers: Reznor; Ross

Halsey singles chronology
"Life's a Mess" (2020)	"I Am Not a Woman, I'm a God" (2021)	"You Asked for This" (2021)

Music video
- "I Am Not a Woman, I'm a God" on YouTube

"I Am Not a Woman, I'm a God" (stylized in sentence case) is a song by American singer-songwriter Halsey from her (Note: Halsey goes by both she/her and they/them pronouns. This article uses she/her for consistency.) fourth studio album If I Can't Have Love, I Want Power, released on August 27, 2021, through Capitol Records. The song impacted US contemporary hit radio on August 31, 2021, as the lead single from the album. It was written by Halsey, Johnathan Cunningham, and Trent Reznor and Atticus Ross of Nine Inch Nails, and was produced by the latter two, who produced all tracks on the album.

== Background and release ==
Months after releasing Badlands (Live from Webster Hall) and cancelling the Manic World Tour due to the COVID-19 pandemic, Halsey began teasing her new era via various billboard across major US cities, alongside teasing the song "Bells in Santa Fe" from the album. It was also revealed that the album was produced by Reznor and Ross, members of American industrial rock band Nine Inch Nails. In a short teaser video, Halsey hinted at the album's punk rock sound. On July 7, 2021, Halsey unveiled the cover art and announced that If I Can't Have Love, I Want Power would be released on August 27, 2021. "Bells in Santa Fe" was used in the first trailer for the If I Can't Have Love, I Want Power IMAX film (directed by Colin Tilley), under the name "All of This is Temporary".

"I Am Not a Woman, I'm a God" was first teased under the name "woman/god" in the second trailer for the If I Can't Have Love, I Want Power film on July 29, 2021. The trailer was released just weeks after Halsey gave birth to her first child.

The film was screened exclusively for one night, in select IMAX cinema theatres on August 25, 2021, two days before the album's release. In the film, Halsey portrays a young pregnant Queen, Lila, as she "wrestles with the manipulative chokehold of love to ultimately discover that the ability to create life (and end it) unlocks the paranormal power within her". The film featured most of the songs on the album, with "I Am Not a Woman, I'm a God" as the eighth song appearing in the film. Two days later, on August 27, the album was released. Halsey released a music video for "I Am Not a Woman, I'm a God" alongside the song and album's release which features scenes from the film. On August 31, the song was serviced to US contemporary hit radio as the lead single from If I Can't Have Love, I Want Power.

On September 30, 2021, a day after her 27th birthday, Halsey released a remix extended play titled I Am Not a Woman, I'm a God (Remixes) with no prior announcement. The EP featured four remixes of "I Am Not a Woman, I'm a God" by various producers.

== Live performances ==
On August 29, 2021, Halsey performed a livestream concert of some of the If I Can't Have Love, I Want Power songs including the bonus tracks "Nightmare (Reprise)" and "Gasoline (Reimagined)". "I Am Not a Woman, I'm a God" was among these songs and was included on the exclusive live album. To further promote the single, Halsey released the live performance to various video-sharing platforms on September 18, 2021.

Halsey performed this song along with "Darling" on Saturday Night Live on October 9, 2021.

== Commercial performance ==
"I Am Not a Woman, I'm a God" was the only track from If I Can't Have Love, I Want Power to chart on the Billboard Hot 100. It debuted and peaked at the number 64 spot. The song also peaked on the Billboard Alternative Streaming Songs, Hot Alternative Songs, Mainstream Top 40, and Global 200 charts at 4, 6, 22, and 73 respectively. The song also charted in Australia, Canada, Ireland, and the United Kingdom.

== Track listing ==
- Digital EP – "I Am Not a Woman, I'm a God (Remixes)"
1. "I Am Not a Woman, I'm a God" (Gazelle Twin Remix) (with Gazelle Twin) – 3:19
2. "I Am Not a Woman, I'm a God" (On-U Sound Remix) (with Adrian Sherwood) – 4:33
3. "I Am Not a Woman, I'm a God" (Underworld's Drift Mix) (with Rick Smith) – 3:08
4. "I Am Not a Woman, I'm a God" (Hot Chip Remix) (with Hot Chip) – 4:54

== Charts ==
=== Weekly charts ===
Weekly chart performance for "I Am Not a Woman, I'm a God"
Chart (2021)	Peak position
Australia (ARIA)	81
Canada Hot 100 (Billboard)	66
Canada CHR/Top 40 (Billboard)	25
Canada Hot AC (Billboard)	41
Czech Republic Airplay (ČNS IFPI)	60
Global 200 (Billboard)	73
Ireland (IRMA)	66
Lithuania (AGATA)	87
New Zealand Hot Singles (Recorded Music NZ)	8
Portugal (AFP)	154
UK Singles (OCC)	72
US Billboard Hot 100	64
US Adult Pop Airplay (Billboard)	34
US Hot Rock & Alternative Songs (Billboard)	6
US Pop Airplay (Billboard)	22

=== Year-end charts ===
Year-end chart performance for "I Am Not a Woman, I'm a God"
Chart (2021)	Position
US Hot Rock & Alternative Songs (Billboard)	49

== Certifications ==
Certifications for "I Am Not a Woman, I'm a God"
Region	Certification	Certified units/sales
Brazil (Pro-Música Brasil)	Gold	20,000^{‡}
United States (RIAA)	Gold	500,000^{‡}
^{‡} Sales+streaming figures based on certification alone.

== Release history ==
Release history for "I Am Not a Woman, I'm a God"
Region	Date	Format	Label	Version	Ref.
United States	August 31, 2021	Contemporary hit radio	Capitol	Original	
Various	September 30, 2021	Digital download; streaming	Capitol	Remix EP	
