= Suga's Interlude =

2019 promotional single by Halsey and Suga of BTS

Promotional single by Halsey and Suga of BTS

from the album Manic
- A-side: "Finally // Beautiful Stranger"
- Released: December 6, 2019
- Genre: K-pop
- Length: 2:18
- Label: Capitol
- Songwriters: Ashley Frangipane; Min Yoon-gi; Peter Losnegård
- Producers: Lido; Pdogg; Suga

Audio video
- "Suga's Interlude" on YouTube

"Suga's Interlude" is a song by American singer Halsey and South Korean rapper Suga of BTS. It was released through Capitol Records on December 6, 2019, alongside "Finally // Beautiful Stranger" as promotional singles from Halsey's third studio album, Manic (2020).

== Background and composition ==
In an Instagram live, Halsey explained why she included Suga on the track, stating "Yoongi is really introspective and has this really intelligent perspective on where we are and what we are doing in our unique lifestyles". "Suga's Interlude" is a "downtrodden" K-pop ballad based around a "somber piano melody", exploring themes of fulfilment, self-loathing and egotism while "encouraging fans to keep pursuing their dreams and look to the future".

== Critical reception ==
Lexi Lane from Atwood Magazine mentioned that the "combination of rap and Halsey's slower singing parts mesh well together sonically and provide a bridge between languages and cultures". Sara Delgado, writing for Teen Vogue, described the track as a "soft tempo track" that "mixes piano keys with airy synths", along with "Halsey's soulful vocals with Suga's sharp rap skills". In an article for Consequence of Sound, Nara Corcoran called the track a "downtrodden ballad" with Halsey "singing sorrowfully over a somber piano melody", and Suga "rapping in Korean quickly but gently" for various verses. Jason Lipshutz of Billboard described the production as "mournful, piano-led" that sees "Halsey [unfurl] a full chorus that focuses on inner struggle" while "Suga flies in with quick-hitting rhymes". Lipshutz also mentioned the "creative chemistry on display" that suggested a "fruitful partnership", as a possible reason why Suga appeared on the track.

== Charts ==
Chart performance for "Suga's Interlude"
Chart (2019)	Peak position
Australia Digital Tracks (ARIA)	27
Canada Hot Digital Song Sales (Billboard)	25
Finland Digital Song Sales (Billboard)	1
Greece Digital Song Sales (Billboard)	4
Hungary (Single Top 40)	9
Malaysia (RIM)	15
New Zealand Hot Singles (RMNZ)	18
Norway Digital Song Sales (Billboard)	8
Scottish Singles Sales (Official Charts)	61
Singapore (RIAS)	29
South Korea (Gaon)	194
Sweden Digital Song Sales (Billboard)	2
UK Singles Downloads (Official Charts)	34
US Pop Digital Song Sales (Billboard)	9

== Certifications ==
Certifications for "Suga's Interlude"
Region	Certification	Certified units/sales
Brazil (Pro-Música Brasil)	Platinum	40,000^{‡}
^{‡} Sales+streaming figures based on certification alone.

== Release history ==
Region	Date	Format	Label	Ref
Various	December 6, 2019	Digital download, streaming	Capitol	
