= Jamee Ranta =

American music video producer and filmmaker

- Born: Kettering, Ohio
- Occupations: Music video producer, commercial producer, filmmaker
- Website: http://www.artifactcontent.com/

Jamee Ranta is a Grammy nominated American producer and CEO of Artifact Content, a multimedia production company she founded in 2017. Based in Los Angeles, Ranta has produced music videos for Justin Bieber, Halsey and Jennifer Lopez.

== Career ==
Early in her career Ranta received a nomination for MTV VMAVideo With a Social Message award in 2014 for Angel Haze's "Battlecry" and in 2015 for an MTV VMA Video With a Social Message award for "Try" by Colbie Caillat.

Ranta's production team won the 2015 MTV Video Music Award for Best Hip-Hop Video for Nicki Minaj's "Anaconda".

In 2020 she won the MTV VMA Best Latin Video for J. Balvin and Maluma's "Que Pena".

Ranta's productions received nine nominations at the 2021 MTV Video Music Awards. Her production for Colombian reggaeton singer J. Balvin's "Rojo" was a Latin Grammy Award for Best Short Form Music Video nominee at the 21st Annual Latin Grammy Awards. Ranta won 2021's BET Award for Video of the Year for "WAP" by Cardi B featuring Megan Thee Stallion

Ranta and Jack Winter co-produced the 2022 Grammy Award Nominated video for Justin Bieber's single "Peaches", directed by Colin Tilley. She produced music videos for Kendrick Lamar, Bon Jovi, Cardi B, Selena Gomez, J Balvin, and Demi Lovato. Ranta has also produced commercials and media in television, documentaries, web series and feature-length films.

== Videography ==
| Year | Title | Artist | Ref |
|---|---|---|---|
| 2023 | Candy Necklace | Lana Del Rey ft. Jon Batiste | |
| 2021 | Peaches | Justin Bieber featuring Daniel Caesar and Giveon | |
| 2021 | Anyone (Justin Bieber song) | Justin Bieber | |
| 2021 | If I Can't Have Love, I Want Power | Halsey | |
| 2021 | Stay (The Kid Laroi and Justin Bieber song) | The Kid Laroi and Justin Bieber | |
| 2021 | Cry Baby | Megan Thee Stallion | |
| 2020 | Rojo | J Balvin | |
| 2020 | WAP | Cardi B featuring Megan Thee Stallion | |
| 2020 | Holy | Justin Bieber | |
| 2019 | Que Calor | Major Lazer feat. J Balvin & El Alfa | |
| 2019 | Que Pena | Maluma (singer), J. Balvin | |
| 2019 | Goodbyes (Post Malone song) | Post Malone | |
| 2019 | 11 Minutes | Yungblud, Halsey feat. Travis Barker | |
| 2019 | Circles | Post Malone | |
| 2019 | Go Loko | YG Entertainment | |
| 2018 | Good Form | Nicki Minaj | |
| 2018 | Night and Day | Katharine McPhee | |
| 2017 | Simply Complicated | Demi Lovato | |
| 2014 | Anaconda | Nicki Minaj | |
| 2014 | Try (Colbie Caillat song) | Colbie Caillat | |
