= If I Can't Have Love, I Want Power =

- Standard cover (Note: This is the uncensored cover artwork of the album, used for its standard editions. A censored cover is also available for the album's digital copies only, in which the right hand of the baby covers Halsey's exposed left nipple.)

Studio album by Halsey
- Released: August 27, 2021
- Recorded: 2020–2021
- Genres: Alternative rock; grunge-pop; industrial; noise rock; pop-punk
- Length: 42:52
- Label: Capitol
- Producers: Trent Reznor; Atticus Ross

Halsey chronology
Manic (2020)	If I Can't Have Love, I Want Power (2021)	The Great Impersonator (2024)

Singles from If I Can't Have Love, I Want Power
- 1. "I Am Not a Woman, I'm a God" Released: August 31, 2021; 2. "You Asked for This" Released: September 7, 2021; 3. "Lilith" Released: June 5, 2023

If I Can't Have Love, I Want Power is the fourth studio album by American singer-songwriter Halsey, released on August 27, 2021, by Capitol Records. Produced by Trent Reznor and Atticus Ross of Nine Inch Nails, the album marked a departure from Halsey's previous work, featuring a heavy industrial influence, and was described by Halsey as a concept album about "the joys and horrors of pregnancy and childbirth". It was her final album for Capitol, before she parted ways with the label in April 2023.

Leading up to the release of If I Can't Have Love, I Want Power, a theatrical film directed by American filmmaker Colin Tilley, titled after the album and featuring its music, screened in select IMAX cinemas around the world on August 25 and 26, 2021. The album went on to debut within the top 10 of thirteen sales charts worldwide, including the US Billboard 200, where it became Halsey's fourth consecutive record to debut inside the top two of the chart. Three singles were released to promote the album: "I Am Not a Woman, I'm a God", which reached number 64 on the Billboard Hot 100, "You Asked for This" and "Lilith". In February 2023, the album was certified Gold by the Recording Industry Association of America (RIAA).

If I Can't Have Love, I Want Power received mostly positive reviews from critics, who praised its ambitious concept and theatrical production. The album was featured in the top 10's of several best-of album lists for 2021, and was nominated for Best Alternative Music Album at the 64th Annual Grammy Awards. The album was supported by the Love and Power Tour.

== Background and recording ==
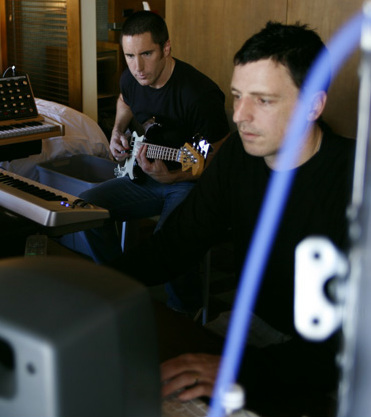
Halsey recruited Trent Reznor (left) and Atticus Ross (right) for the album's production, with whom she said she had always wanted to collaborate.

In January 2020, Halsey released her (Note: Halsey's pronouns are she/her and they/them. This article uses she/her pronouns for consistency.) third studio album, Manic, which spawned "Without Me", her second number one single on the US Billboard Hot 100 chart. She toured Europe from February to March 2020 as part of her third concert tour, the Manic World Tour, before the rest of the tour was postponed and later cancelled due to the COVID-19 pandemic. During the pandemic, Halsey remained musically active; she contributed the song "Experiment on Me" to the soundtrack for the superhero film Birds of Prey (2020), produced by Oliver Sykes and Jordan Fish (of Bring Me the Horizon), and collaborated on songs with artists such as Kelsea Ballerini's "The Other Girl", Juice Wrld's "Life's a Mess", and Machine Gun Kelly's "Forget Me Too". She also announced her first pregnancy, with American screenwriter Alev Aydin, after suffering several miscarriages due to endometriosis and undergoing surgery in 2017.

Around 2019, Halsey decided to reinvent her sound. "If I want to sustain myself and give myself longevity, I need to continue to make things that I love and make things that challenge me as a creative". She reached out to Trent Reznor and Atticus Ross of Nine Inch Nails with a letter, asking them if they could produce the album. "I was just really honest and said I was a huge fan and I’ve been plagiarising you guys for years – badly – and I’m not arrogant enough to believe that I have anything new to offer you, but this album is about pregnancy, gender identity, body horror. The most important thing to me is that this album has tension – it needs to be visceral, or I’m doing a disservice to the message."

The album was a long-distance project, with Reznor and Ross recording in Los Angeles while Halsey sang all of its songs at a studio in Turks and Caicos Islands. Other remote contributions include drums by American musician Dave Grohl in "Honey" and guitar by American musician Lindsey Buckingham in "Darling". Speaking to Zane Lowe on Apple Music 1, Halsey stated she had been wanting to work with Nine Inch Nails for years, because she "wanted really cinematic sort of, not horror specifically, but kind of just really unsettling production" on one of her projects. In an interview with Lizzy Goodman at Capitol Studios, Halsey stated that she started working on the album in June 2020, and that "Lilith" was the first song written for the record.

== Composition and lyrics ==
If I Can't Have Love, I Want Power is an alternative rock, grunge-pop, industrial, noise rock, pop-punk, and rock record, with heavy industrial rock influences and an overarching cinematic mood. It also infuses ambient, avant-garde, drum and bass, hip-hop, punk rock, and synth-pop elements in its songs. Critics dubbed the album a departure from the arena pop sound of Halsey's previous albums. The instrumentation of If I Can't Have Love, I Want Power consists of rattling drums, rough and heavily distorted guitar riffs, tinkling keyboard lines, stark pianos, and drum machines. Feminism is the coalescing theme throughout the album, specifically institutionalized misogyny and patriarchy. However, Halsey stated that it was not a "girl power" album. "[T]he lead single is ‘I Am Not a Woman, I'm a God’ [...] From the jump, I’m like, ‘I’m not a woman.’ I'm not saying any of that. There's no girl power in this album."

=== Concept ===
This album is a concept album about the joys and horrors of pregnancy and childbirth. It was very important to me that the cover art conveyed the sentiment of my journey over the past few months. The dichotomy of the Madonna and the Whore. The idea that me as a sexual being and my body as a vessel and gift to my child are two concepts that can co-exist peacefully and powerfully. My body has belonged to the world in many different ways the past few years, and this image is my means of reclaiming my autonomy and establishing my pride and strength as a life force for my human being.

— Halsey introducing If I Can't Have Love, I Want Power, Instagram

Halsey stated If I Can't Have Love, I Want Power is a concept album focusing on the positives and negatives of pregnancy and childbirth. The album was originally built around "mortality and everlasting love and our place/permanence", but the emotional impact of her pregnancy "introduced new themes of control and body horror and autonomy and conceit." Halsey also emphasized that it "feels very cool" to have an album with no guest features again, following her debut studio album, Badlands (2015). She said If I Can't Have Love, I Want Power "had to be entirely from [her] voice".

== Artwork ==
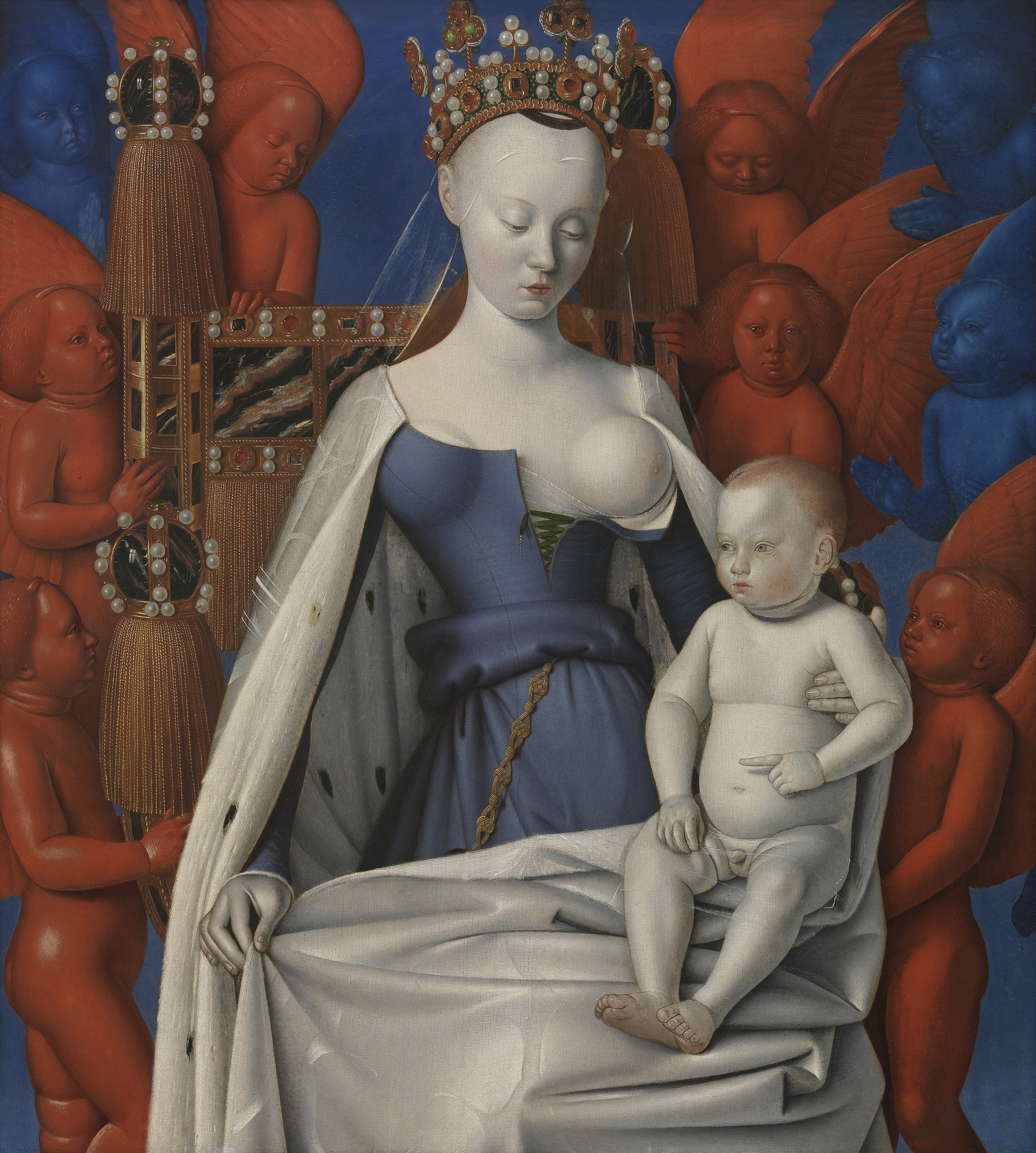
The album's cover artwork is modelled after the Virgin and Child Surrounded by Angels, a 1452 Renaissance painting of Madonna by Jean Fouquet.

The cover artwork of If I Can't Have Love, I Want Power was unveiled through video shot at the Metropolitan Museum of Art in New York City, in which Halsey walked through the exhibits before finally pulling away a cover to reveal the life-size picture of the artwork. The cover artwork was photographed by Lucas Garrido. It depicts an artistic rendering of Halsey as Madonna, a category of icons and works of art depicting Mary, mother of Jesus. The singer is seen seated on a golden throne, wearing a purple dress, holding a baby with a towel, with her left breast exposed. She stated that the artwork portrays "the sentiment of [her] journey over the past few months", and aims to uproot the social stigma around "bodies & breastfeeding".

The artwork was specifically inspired by the Virgin and Child Surrounded By Angels from Jean Fouquet's two-panel Renaissance oil painting called Melun Diptych, and became a subject of widespread attention and discussion on the internet. The Mercury News associated the artwork with the topfreedom movement on Instagram "#FreeTheNipple", and noted visual similarities to Cersei Lannister, a Game of Thrones character. However, The Spectator criticized it for appropriation of Catholic art, expressing bafflement with "the complacency of today's Catholics when it comes to the misuse of their iconography." A censored version of the album cover, where the exposed left nipple is covered by the baby's hand, is also available to music streaming platforms. The censored version of the cover was also used on CD and vinyl pressings available at Target and Walmart stores.

== Promotion and release ==
On June 28, 2021, numerous billboards went up across major cities of the United States, announcing the fourth studio album by Halsey, titled If I Can't Have Love, I Want Power. The singer confirmed it herself through her social media accounts on the same day. Together with the announcement, she also previewed "Bells in Santa Fe", one of the tracks from the album. It was also revealed that the album was produced by American musician Trent Reznor and English musician Atticus Ross, members of American industrial rock band Nine Inch Nails. In a short teaser video, Halsey hinted at the album's punk rock sound. On July 7, 2021, Halsey unveiled the cover art and announced that If I Can't Have Love, I Want Power would be released on August 27, 2021. Halsey gave birth to her child, Ender Ridley Aydin, on July 14, 2021.

The album was released on August 27, 2021, with minimal promotion. Its CDs, vinyl records, and box sets were made available for pre-order on July 7, 2021, on Halsey's webstore. Limited-edition red vinyl LPs, with an alternative cover, were sold exclusively at Urban Outfitters. Halsey graced the August 2021 cover of American women's magazine Allure, for which she was interviewed about her social identity, relationships, pregnancy, and family. On July 23, 2021, an online game called "LXXXXP" was launched, which is a choose-your-own-adventure-style platform that encourages users to "choose your path and discover your destiny". The "You drowned in a freezing lake" outcome results in a snippet of a song from the album, which turns out to be an instrumental from "The Lighthouse", track 12. On August 10, 2021, the titles of the album's songs were revealed through Amazon Alexa, which recited the track listing upon asking it "Alexa, tell me about Halsey's new album." The next day, Halsey herself posted the track list across her social media. No singles were released from the album prior to its release.

Halsey debuted "I Am Not a Woman, I'm a God" and "Darling" live at Saturday Night Live on October 9, 2021, hosted by American media personality Kim Kardashian. For the performance of "Darling", she was accompanied by Lindsey Buckingham playing guitar and providing backup vocals. An extended version of the album, featuring the 2019 single "Nightmare" as well as a reprise of it, and an exclusive track, titled "People Disappear Here", was released on January 3, 2022. ("People Disappear Here" features Mike Garson at the outro but was not properly credited in the footnote.). On August 31, 2022, Halsey released a deluxe edition of the album, including three demos from the songs "1121", "Honey" and "Lilith".

Halsey performed the Diablo IV Anthem version of "Lilith" at The Game Awards 2022 as a joint promotion with Diablo IV whose primary antagonist shares the same name. The full version with Suga of BTS was released on June 5, 2023, along with the music video.

=== Film ===
On July 13, 2021, Halsey posted a trailer across her social media to an hour-long film, titled If I Can't Have Love, I Want Power as well; the trailer preceded the album as its companion. The accompanying film is directed by American filmmaker Colin Tilley, who previously directed Halsey's music videos for "Without Me" and "You Should Be Sad" (2020). Actress Sasha Lane appears in the film and is credited as a co-star on the film's promotional material. It is rated R.

The film features music from the album. Rolling Stone reported that the film incorporates fantasy, drawing visual influences from American television series Game of Thrones and the 2006 film Marie Antoinette, alongside themes of motherhood and mysticism in its storyline. Halsey was styled by American stylist Law Roach in the film; Halsey's own beauty line, About-Face, was used for her makeup. The opening of the trailer states, "this film is about the lifelong social labyrinth of sexuality and birth" and "the greatest horror stories never told were buried with the bodies of those who died in that labyrinth."

The film was screened exclusively for one night, in select IMAX cinema theatres. On July 29, 2021, a second trailer, titled "woman/god trailer", soundtracked with lyrics "I am not a woman, I'm a god/ I am not a martyr, I'm a problem/ I am not a legend, I'm a fraud" from the eleventh track of the album "I Am Not a Woman, I'm a God", was released on July 29, 2021. She announced the list of cities in the US the film will be screened on August 25, 2021, and the international cities on August 26, ahead of the album's release on August 27. The tickets went for sale on August 3, 2021. If I Can't Have Love, I Want Power was released on October 7, 2021, on HBO Max. In celebration of the album's one-year anniversary, Halsey released a limited collector's edition Blu-Ray of the film, which comes with the film and a CD of the album, housed in a 64-page picture book of production stills, behind-the-scenes photos, and artwork by Halsey.

=== Singles ===
"I Am Not a Woman, I'm a God" was released to US contemporary hit radio on August 31, 2021, as the lead single from If I Can't Have Love, I Want Power. The second single, "You Asked for This", was serviced to US alternative radio on September 7, 2021.

On June 5, 2023, Halsey released a reimagined version of "Lilith" in promotion of the console game Diablo IV. This version included some different lyrics and production, and features Suga of South Korean boy band BTS. The music video was released later that day. Forbes called the song "a brilliant marketing move". The song is the third single off of If I Can't Have Love, I Want Power and was released around a week before it was announced that Halsey had joined Columbia Records after leaving her former label, Capitol Records earlier in the year after almost a decade of being under them.

== Critical reception ==
Professional ratings
Aggregate scores
Source	Rating
AnyDecentMusic?	7.7/10
Metacritic	80/100
Review scores
Source	Rating
AllMusic	4.5/5 stars
Clash	8/10
The Independent	4/5 stars
Kerrang!	4/5
The Line of Best Fit	8/10
NME	4/5 stars
Pitchfork	7.0/10
Rolling Stone	3.5/5 stars
Slant	3.5/5 stars
The Sydney Morning Herald	4/5 stars

If I Can't Have Love, I Want Power received mostly positive reviews upon release. At Metacritic, which assigns a normalized rating out of 100 to reviews from publications, the album has a weighted mean score of 80 based on 17 critics, indicating "generally favorable reviews".

Spin praised If I Can't Have Love, I Want Power for its "masterclass in songwriting" and "seductive" production. NME's Nick Levine described the album as an intense, intricate, cinematic, "fierce and fascinating" artistic statement, while Craig Jenkins of Vulture hailed it as "the best Halsey album" for its sound and concept. Sal Cinquemani of Slant also lauded its production, and its "straightforward" themes of "self-doubt, self-sabotage, self-empowerment". Marie Oleinik, reviewing for The Line of Best Fit, dubbed the album a bold and ambitious work of art, with "gorgeous, intense" production that is "never overdone", and admired its simplistic and "breathtakingly tender" songs as well. Music journalist Jon Pareles, writing for The New York Times, said the album is a homage to Halsey's "1990s roots" and simultaneously a strategic turn toward archetypes, eschewing autobiographical lyrics. Luke Morton of Kerrang! said the album is "not a pop record, nor should it be", rather delves into Halsey's punk affinity, solidifying her creative freedom. He added it is a record of juxtaposing moods, where a stream of consciousness connects the tracks to one another.

Jessie Atkinson of Gigwise felt the album displays Halsey's potential and "restrained development in sound". Clash critic Robin Murray deemed it a "powerful song cycle", exhibiting Halsey at her most confrontational, "direct and unbowed". Giselle Au-Nhien Nguyen of The Sydney Morning Herald wrote If I Can't Have Love, I Want Power is a "theatrical, grandiose listening experience" that works as a proclamation of Halsey's identity and artistic intentions, and complimented the sonic diversity of its tracks. Variety's Chris Willman picked the album's honest songwriting and alternative rock sound as its best aspects, emphasizing the creative chemistry between Halsey, Reznor and Ross. Helen Brown of The Independent compared Halsey to Pink and Grimes in "bringing a darker, racketier attitude to major-label pop". Brown dubbed the album "a definite power-up", and suggested Halsey could have experimented more musically and lyrically, to "allow the songs to make a deeper mark".

Some reviews were moderately critical of the album. Rolling Stone critic Julyssa Lopez wrote If I Can't Have Love, I Want Power is an adventurous, highly dramatic, and "supremely theatrical" album, that is slightly overwrought at times. Dani Blum of Pitchfork named the album the strongest project of Halsey's career, and praised its experimental production by Reznor and Ross. Consequence's Mary Siroky complimented the album's production and themes, but expressed mixed opinions about its lyrics; she felt they are, at times, simply "interesting phrases more than they are interesting ideas", but elsewhere, the lyrics "unfold like poetry". John Amen, writing for PopMatters, said If I Can't Have Love, I Want Power has some of the best songs and vocals of Halsey's career, but its "inaptly sleek" production undercuts her connection with listeners. Nevertheless, he felt the album "contains enough magic to be infectious." Kitty Empire of The Observer said the album's 13 tracks "don't quite live up" to the theme Halsey teased, a "Game of Thrones-meets-French Revolution-themed goth rock opera about the Madonna–whore complex."

=== Accolades ===
Accolades for If I Can't Have Love, I Want Power
Publication	List	Rank	Ref.
AllMusic	AllMusic Best of 2021	N/A	
BBC	The 10 best tracks and albums of 2021	N/A	
Billboard	The 50 Best Albums of 2021	6	
Consequence	Top 50 Albums of 2021	40	
The Fader	The 50 Best Albums of 2021	26	
Genius	50 Best Albums of 2021	2	
Kerrang!	The 50 Best Albums of 2021	9	
The Line of Best Fit	The Best Albums of 2021	15	
NME	Albums of the Year 2021	8	
People	Top 10 Albums of 2021	5	
PopMatters	The 75 Best Albums of 2021	71	
Rolling Stone	The 50 Best Albums of 2021	18	
Rolling Stone	The 50 Greatest Concept Albums of All Time	42	
Uproxx	The 50 Best Albums of 2021	N/A	
Vulture	The Best Albums of 2021	10	

=== Industry awards ===
The album was nominated for Best Alternative Music Album at the 64th Annual Grammy Awards.

== Commercial performance ==
The album reached the top 10 of the official albums charts of various countries. In the United States, If I Can't Have Love, I Want Power arrived at number two on the Billboard 200, blocked from the top spot by American rapper Kanye West's Donda (2021). The album marked Halsey's fourth consecutive album to reach the chart's top two. It opened with 98,000 album-equivalent units, consisting of 26,500 streaming units and 70,500 sales. Of the 70,500 sum, physical sales comprise 52,500 copies (across CDs, vinyl LPs and cassettes), while digital album sales were 18,000. Additionally, If I Can't Have Love, I Want Power topped the Top Alternative Albums, yielding Halsey's second number-one album on the chart after Badlands (2015), her debut studio album. On February 1, 2023, the album was certified Gold by the Recording Industry Association of America (RIAA).

== Track listing ==
All tracks are written by Ashley Frangipane, Trent Reznor, Atticus Ross, and Johnathan Cunningham, and produced by Reznor and Ross, except where noted. Lyrics by Halsey.

If I Can't Have Love, I Want Power track listing
No.	Title	Writer(s)	Length
1.	"The Tradition"	Frangipane; Reznor; Ross; Greg Kurstin	3:46
2.	"Bells in Santa Fe"		3:37
3.	"Easier than Lying"		3:26
4.	"Lilith"		2:47
5.	"Girl Is a Gun"		2:26
6.	"You Asked for This"	Frangipane; Reznor; Ross; Kurstin	4:26
7.	"Darling"		3:02
8.	"1121"		2:42
9.	"Honey"		2:53
10.	"Whispers"		3:11
11.	"I Am Not a Woman, I'm a God"		2:56
12.	"The Lighthouse"		4:33
13.	"Ya'aburnee"		3:08
Total length:			42:52

Extended edition bonus tracks
No.	Title	Writer(s)	Producer(s)	Length
14.	"Nightmare"	Frangipane; Benjamin Levin; Elena Kiper; Magnus Høiberg; Ivan Shapovalov; Martin Kierszenbaum; Nathan Perez; Sergio Galoyan; Trevor Horn; Valerij Polienko	Benny Blanco; Cashmere Cat; Happy Perez	3:52
15.	"Nightmare (Reprise)"	Frangipane; Levin; Kiper; Høiberg; Shapovalov; Kierszenbaum; Perez; Sergio Galoyan; Horn; Polienko		4:06
16.	"People Disappear Here"	Frangipane; Reznor; Ross; Kurstin		4:08
Total length:				54:58

Deluxe edition bonus tracks
No.	Title	Writer(s)	Length
17.	"1121" (demo)	Frangipane; Cunningham	2:51
18.	"Honey" (demo)	Frangipane; Cunningham	2:48
19.	"Lilith" (demo)	Frangipane; Cunningham	2:47
Total length:			63:25

=== Notes ===
- "People Disappear Here" is also a bonus track on the Japanese, HMV and Target editions of the album. Target edition also includes the live reimagined version of "Gasoline".
- "Nightmare" (Reprise) is also a bonus track on Walmart edition of the album.
- The Live Performance version of the album includes live recordings of eight songs from the album: "The Tradition", "Lilith", "Easier than Lying", "Girl Is a Gun", "You Asked for This", "Darling", "Honey", "I Am Not a Woman, I'm a God" and "Nightmare (Reprise)".
- The demos of "1121", "Honey", and "Lilith" are subtitled "John Cunningham Demo" on some streaming platforms.
- "You Asked for This", "I Am Not a Woman, I'm a God", and "People Disappear Here" are stylized in sentence case, and "Honey" is stylized in all lowercase.
- "1121" is pronounced "eleven twenty-one". "1121" refers to November 21, 2020, the day Halsey found out she was pregnant.
- "Ya'aburnee" (يقبرني) means "may he bury me" in varieties of Arabic, particularly Syrian and Lebanese Arabic, and is a variant of the common expression "ta'aburnee" (تقبرني) that means "may you bury me". A term of endearment, it signifies the speaker's hope to be outlived by a loved one they could not bear to lose.
- "Nightmare" and its reprise contain an interpolation of "All the Things She Said", written by Sergio Galoyan, Trevor Horn, Martin Kierszenbaum, Valerij Polienko, and Elena Kiper, as performed by t.A.T.u.

== Personnel ==
Musicians

- Halsey – vocals, songwriting
- Trent Reznor – piano (1, 2, 8, 10, 13), programming (1–6, 8–13), sampler (1, 3, 4, 7, 13), synthesizer (1–5, 8–11), bass (3, 6, 9, 12, 13), guitar (3, 6, 9, 12), vocals (12)
- Atticus Ross – programming (1–6, 8–13)
- Kevin "The Bug" Martin – programming (2)
- Pino Palladino – bass (4)
- Karriem Riggins – drums (4)
- Jack Dangers – programming (5)
- Dave Sitek – guitar (6)
- Lindsey Buckingham – guitar (7)
- Dave Grohl – drums (9)
- Mike Garson – piano (16)

Technical

- Trent Reznor – producer, engineer
- Atticus Ross – producer, engineer
- Stephen Marcussen – mastering engineer
- Stewart Whitmore – mastering engineer
- Serban Ghenea – mixer (1, 2, 4, 6–13)
- Alan Moulder – mixer (3, 5)
- John Hanes – mix engineer (1, 2, 4, 6–13)
- Mat Mitchell – engineer
- Greg Kurstin – recording engineer (1), vocal producer (1, 6), vocal engineer (6)
- John Cunningham – recording engineer (2, 3), vocal engineer (4, 5, 7–13)
- Darrell Thorp – recording engineer (9)
- Julian Burg – vocal engineer (1, 6)
- Brandon Buttner – vocal engineer (12)
- Tom Herbert – assistant mixer (3, 5)

== Charts ==
Chart performance for If I Can't Have Love, I Want Power
Chart (2021)	Peak position
Australian Albums (ARIA)	3
Austrian Albums (Ö3 Austria)	8
Belgian Albums (Ultratop Flanders)	4
Belgian Albums (Ultratop Wallonia)	9
Canadian Albums (Billboard)	5
Czech Albums (ČNS IFPI)	84
Danish Albums (Hitlisten)	35
Dutch Albums (Album Top 100)	6
Finnish Albums (Suomen virallinen lista)	12
French Albums (SNEP)	70
German Albums (Offizielle Top 100)	5
Irish Albums (Official Charts)	6
Italian Albums (FIMI)	24
Japanese Albums (Oricon)	156
Lithuanian Albums (AGATA)	17
New Zealand Albums (RMNZ)	5
Norwegian Albums (VG-lista)	9
Polish Albums (ZPAV)	22
Portuguese Albums (AFP)	11
Scottish Albums (Official Charts)	3
Slovak Albums (ČNS IFPI)	34
Swedish Albums (Sverigetopplistan)	24
Spanish Albums (Promusicae)	12
Swiss Albums (Schweizer Hitparade)	7
UK Albums (Official Charts)	5
US Billboard 200	2
US Top Alternative Albums (Billboard)	1

== Certifications ==
Certifications for If I Can't Have Love, I Want Power
Region	Certification	Certified units/sales
Brazil (Pro-Música Brasil) extended	Gold	20,000^{‡}
United States (RIAA)	Gold	500,000^{‡}
^{‡} Sales+streaming figures based on certification alone.

== Release history ==
Release dates and formats for If I Can't Have Love, I Want Power
Region	Date	Format(s)	Version	Label	Ref.
Various	August 27, 2021	Box set; CD; digital download; LP; streaming	Standard	Capitol	
United States	August 27, 2021	CD; vinyl	Walmart bonus	Capitol	
Brazil	October 22, 2021	CD	Standard	Universal Music Brasil	
Various	January 3, 2022	Digital download; streaming	Extended	Capitol	
