= Manic (Halsey album) =

2020 studio album by Halsey

Studio album by Halsey
- Released: January 17, 2020
- Recorded: August 2018–August 2019
- Genre: Pop
- Length: 47:36
- Languages: English; Korean
- Label: Capitol
- Producers: Ashley Frangipane; Alex Young; Andrew Jackson; Benny Blanco; Cashmere Cat; Duck Blackwell; Fred; Greg Kurstin; Jasper Sheff; John Cunningham; Jon Bellion; Lido; Louis Bell; The Monsters & Strangerz; Ojivolta; Pdogg; Suga

Halsey chronology
Hopeless Fountain Kingdom (2017)	Manic (2020)	If I Can't Have Love, I Want Power (2021)

Singles from Manic
- 1. "Without Me" Released: October 4, 2018; 2. "Graveyard" Released: September 13, 2019; 3. "You Should Be Sad" Released: January 10, 2020

Manic is the third studio album by American singer Halsey. It was released on January 17, 2020, through Capitol Records. It was preceded by the release of three singles: "Without Me", "Graveyard" and "You Should Be Sad", with featured guest appearances by Dominic Fike, Alanis Morissette, and Suga. The album debuted at number two on the Billboard 200 albums chart in the US, becoming Halsey's third top-two album on the chart and her biggest album debut in the country to date, selling 239,000 units in its first week.

Manic was certified 2× Platinum by the Recording Industry Association of America (RIAA), becoming the first album released in 2020 to achieve this. Music production was handled by Halsey, Benny Blanco, Cashmere Cat, Finneas, Greg Kurstin, Jon Bellion, Lido, and Louis Bell, among others. Primarily a pop, electropop, hip hop and alternative rock record, Manic also draws influences from country, and R&B. Halsey described the album as changing its mind as much as she does. To promote the album, Halsey embarked on her third concert tour, the Manic World Tour, but after 17 shows it was postponed and then cancelled due to the COVID-19 pandemic.

== Background and composition ==
On October 4, 2018, Halsey released the song "Without Me", her first solo material since her second studio album Hopeless Fountain Kingdom, released in 2017. Originally, the song was intended as a standalone track, but was later included on the record, becoming the actual lead single. In March 2019, Halsey announced that her third studio album would be released in 2020 and that she wanted it to be "perfect". The standalone single, "Nightmare", released on May 17, 2019, was originally intended to be the lead single from the album, but was cut; it later appeared on extended editions of her subsequent album, If I Can't Have Love, I Want Power. A scene in the music video for "Nightmare" showed Halsey holding a newspaper reading "MANIC" and another scene where she holds a sign reading "H3 / AI / 10--2019", which some speculated as a hint that the album would be released in October 2019. However, it was released on January 17, 2020.

During a question-and-answer session on August 7, 2019, she stated that the album is "less dystopian fantasy world" and that it reflects her current worldview. In her Rolling Stone cover story, Halsey stated that Manic is a sampling of "hip-hop, rock, country, fucking everything—because it's so manic. It's soooooo manic. It's literally just, like, whatever the fuck I felt like making; there was no reason I couldn't make it". She revealed the album title on her social media on September 12, 2019, along with an official link to a website with the album title. The website contained a livestream of the singer painting the album cover. The album has 16 tracks on the standard edition. She revealed the tracklist on December 3, 2019, and went live on Instagram shortly after to discuss the album and answer fan questions. During the live, she stated that the album is very personal: she said "I feel like you guys have really given me the chance this year to express myself more and be myself in a way that I don't know if I’ve really felt like I have been able to since my first album". She also stated that fans would get to meet a part of her that she's been really excited to show. When asked what her favorite song is, she said that the most personal one is "More", and not being able to pick just one, she listed some of her favorites which include, "I Hate Everybody", "929", "Killing Boys", and "Dominic's Interlude". The album was revealed to have three features including Dominic Fike, Alanis Morissette, and Suga of BTS. Halsey described them as "People who really represent different parts of my psyche and different parts of my personality in so many different ways".

Manic is a "busy album" and a "raw and honest look into Halsey's head and heart", on which she explores many genres, including "electro-pop, sparkly ballads, hip-hop, twang, and '90s alt rock" and "everything from Lilith Fair folk guitar to South Korean rap". Lyrically, it deals with the singer's struggles with bipolar disorder (previously known as manic depression).

On September 29, 2020, the expanded edition of Manic was released in honor of Halsey's birthday. The expanded version features the 16 songs on the original version as well as the deluxe limited edition songs "Wipe Your Tears" and "I'm Not Mad", Halsey's "Be Kind" collaboration with Marshmello, the Juice Wrld and Illenium remixes of "Without Me", the acoustic versions of "Graveyard" and "You Should Be Sad", and stripped versions of "Alanis' Interlude", "Without Me", "Graveyard", and "3AM".

== Singles ==
On October 4, 2018, Halsey released "Without Me" after teasing the song a few weeks prior during a show in London on September 23, 2018. It was followed by a Spotify vertical video released on October 12, 2018, and a music video a few weeks later on October 29, 2018. The song became commercially successful, reaching the top three in several countries including, Australia, Canada, and the UK. The song also topped the US Billboard Hot 100, spending two weeks at number one, becoming her first chart-topping song as a lead artist. It went on to spend 29 weeks in the top ten of the Billboard Hot 100, making it the third longest-running top ten song by a female artist, behind only Billie Eilish’s "Bad Guy" and LeAnn Rimes' "How Do I Live", and became her third song to spend over a year on the Billboard Hot 100, becoming the only female artist in history to achieve this. It was ranked number three on the 2019 Billboard Year End Chart and number 12 on the 2010s’ Billboard Decade End Chart. The song's been certified 8× Platinum in Canada, 7× Platinum in Australia and the US, 2× Platinum in New Zealand, Platinum in Italy, Sweden, and the UK, Gold in Belgian. The song was originally intended to be a standalone single, with "Nightmare" being originally planned as the lead single but was cut and "Without Me" was included in the album's final track listing, serving as the album's lead single.

On September 3, 2019, Halsey announced "Graveyard" as the album's second single through her social media, revealing the cover art and release date and was made available for pre-save the same day. Halsey performed the song for the first time two days prior to its release on September 11, 2019, at Rihanna's Savage X Fenty show as one of the musical guests. The song was released on September 13, 2019, along with the album preorder, and impacted US radio on September 17, 2019. The accompanying music video was released on October 8, 2019, which features actress, Sydney Sweeney. Commercially, the song reached the top 40 in several countries including, Australia, Canada, Ireland, New Zealand, and the UK while peaking at number 34 on the Billboard Hot 100. It's since been certified 2× Platinum in Australia and Canada, Platinum in the US, and Gold in the UK.

On January 8, 2020, Halsey announced through social media that she would be releasing the album's third official single, "You Should Be Sad", along with its accompanying music video on January 10, 2020, one week ahead of the album's release. The song impacted US radio on January 14, 2020. The song debuted at number 29 on the Billboard Hot 100 with it rising to number 26, where it peaked, the following week. It also reached number four in Australia, number five in Ireland, and reached the top 30 in Belgium, Canada, New Zealand, and the UK and has been certified 3× Platinum in Canada, Platinum in Australia and the US, and Gold in New Zealand and the UK.

On April 29, 2020, Halsey announced "Be Kind", an EDM collaboration with American producer Marshmello that would be released two days later on May 1. Both promoted the song by posting a flower visual on each other's social medias. The song impacted US radio on May 5, 2020, with the music video being released on June 27, 2020. The song was commercially successful, debuting and peaking at number 29 on the Billboard Hot 100 while also reaching the top forty in over 16 other countries and has been certified 2× Platinum in Canada and Gold in Australia. It was added to the digital deluxe edition of the album on September 29, 2020.

=== Promotional singles ===
On September 29, 2019, to celebrate her birthday, Halsey released the first promotional single, "Clementine", as a surprise with no prior announcement. The music video was released the same day.

On December 3, 2019, during an Instagram live, Halsey revealed that two new songs and a music video would be released the following Friday on December 6, 2019. The next day she announced through social media that "Finally // Beautiful Stranger" and "Suga's Interlude" would be the songs she was releasing, serving as the second and third promotional singles respectively. A music video for "Finally // Beautiful Stranger" was released along with the songs. While neither entered the Billboard Hot 100, "Finally // Beautiful Stranger" entered the Bubbling Under Hot 100 at number 17 and "Suga's Interlude" peaked at number ten on the US Pop Digital Song Sales chart.

=== Other songs ===
On June 15, 2020, Halsey uploaded a video of the original recording of "Wipe Your Tears" which is 2:18 long. She has since revealed there is a third version which features another artist. On September 29, 2020, to celebrate her twenty-sixth birthday, Halsey released a music video for "929" which features various archive footage of the singer throughout her life.

On October 7, 2020, Halsey released the music video for "Dominic's Interlude" with Dominic Fike. The video was previously used as a visualizer for the song on the Manic World Tour (2020) between Halsey's performance of "Forever ... (Is a Long Time)" and "I Hate Everybody", as it appears on the album.

== Critical reception ==
Manic ratings
Aggregate scores
Source	Rating
AnyDecentMusic?	7.4/10
Metacritic	80/100
Review scores
Source	Rating
AllMusic	4/5 stars
Entertainment Weekly	B+
Exclaim!	8/10
The Guardian	4/5 stars
The Line of Best Fit	9/10
NME	4/5 stars
Pitchfork	6.5/10
PopMatters	7/10 stars
Rolling Stone	4/5 stars
Slant	4/5 stars

At Metacritic, which assigns a normalized rating out of 100 to reviews from mainstream critics, the album has an average score of 80 out of 100, which indicates "generally favorable reviews" based on 18 reviews.

Stephen Thomas Erlewine of AllMusic said that the album "showcases Halsey at her nerviest and at her best." Ilana Kaplan from the Entertainment Weekly praised the album calling it "a chaotic amalgamation of self-analysis, rage, depression, ecstasy, and growth" that sees its creator "managing the messiness of fame while trying to stay true to herself." In a positive review from Exclaim!, Chantel Ouellet wrote that Manic is her most personal album to date. Rob Sheffield of Rolling Stone gave the album a positive review and named Manic an "excellent new album", praising its versatility of genres and "Halsey's raw autobiographical portrait of [herself] as a young mess, craving her share of love and tenderness in a hostile world". In a four-star review for The Guardian, Ben Beaumont-Thomas praised Halsey's lyrical evolution, citing that "her lyrical confidence is matched by the characterful production, which straddles R&B, country, trashy pop-rock, Kacey Musgraves-ish cosmic Americana and more".

In a positive review for PopMatters, Jeffrey Davies referred to the album as a "refreshingly intimate portrait of a young woman navigating fame, femininity, and mental illness" and wrote: "From an artist whose style and image or lack thereof has tended to take precedence over her music and her psyche, Manic is an honest invitation into the worlds of both Halsey and Ashley Frangipane, and teaches us that the truth is in the ambiguity." Steven Loftin from The Line of Best Fit stated that Manic "revels in the explorative genre-pop bombast, letting the delicates twinkle, and the snarls bare their teeth; yet it's the soul that shines dominantly." He also named it her most complete work to date.

In June and July 2020, the album was included on Billboard, American Songwriter, and Uproxx's lists of the best albums of 2020 so far.

== Commercial performance ==
Manic debuted at number two on the US Billboard 200 with 239,000 album-equivalent units, of which 180,000 were pure album sales. It is Halsey's third top-two album and her biggest opening week so far on the chart. The album's tracks earned a total of 75.6 million on-demand US streams in its first week. In Australia, the album debuted at number two. In the UK, the album debuted and peaked at number six. It also reached the top ten in Belgium, Canada, Ireland, and New Zealand.

== Track listing ==
Credits adapted from Tidal and CMG Credits. Halsey revealed the tracklist on her Instagram on December 3, 2019.

Manic track listing
No.	Title	Writer(s)	Producer(s)	Length
1.	"Ashley"	Ashley Frangipane; Brenton Duvall; Benjamin Levin; Magnus August Høiberg; Alex Young	Benny Blanco; Cashmere Cat; Young; Duvall^{[a]}	3:06
2.	"Clementine"	Frangipane; Johnathan Carter Cunningham; Jasper Sheff	Halsey; Cunningham	3:54
3.	"Graveyard"	Frangipane; Amy Allen; Jon Bellion; Louis Bell; Jordan K. Johnson; Stefan Johnson; Mark "Oji" Williams	The Monsters & Strangerz; Bellion; Ojivolta; Bell	3:01
4.	"You Should Be Sad"	Frangipane; Greg Kurstin	Kurstin	3:25
5.	"Forever ... (Is a Long Time)"	Frangipane; Peder Losnegård; Levin; Høiberg; Nathan Perez	Halsey; Lido	2:47
6.	"Dominic's Interlude" (with Dominic Fike)	Frangipane; Fike; Losnegård; Andrew Jackson; Duck Blackwell	Halsey; Lido; Jackson; Blackwell	1:16
7.	"I Hate Everybody"	Frangipane; Losnegård; Levin; Høiberg; Perez; Sarah Aarons; Noonie Bao; Finneas O'Connell	Halsey; Lido; Finneas^{[a]}	2:51
8.	"3AM"	Frangipane; Kurstin	Kurstin	3:54
9.	"Without Me"	Frangipane; Justin Timberlake; Timothy Mosley; Scott Storch; Bell; Allen; Brittany Amaradio	Bell	3:21
10.	"Finally // Beautiful Stranger"	Frangipane; Kurstin	Kurstin	3:41
11.	"Alanis' Interlude" (with Alanis Morissette)	Frangipane; Morissette; Losnegård; Mike Farrell; Jesse Lacey; Vincent Accardi; Brian Lane; Garrett Tierney; Derrick Sherman	Halsey; Lido	2:41
12.	"Killing Boys"	Frangipane; Cunningham; Levin; Høiberg; Perez; Nate Ruess	Halsey; Cunningham	2:23
13.	"Suga's Interlude" (with Suga of BTS)	Frangipane; Min Yoon-gi; Losnegård	Halsey; Lido; Suga; Pdogg	2:18
14.	"More"	Frangipane; Losnegård; Levin; Høiberg; Ammar Malik; Andrew Wells; Dave Lubben; Kevin Snevely	Halsey; Lido; Wells^{[a]}	2:33
15.	"Still Learning"	Frangipane; Bell; Fred Gibson; Ed Sheeran; Romy Madley Croft	Fred; Bell	3:31
16.	"929"	Frangipane; Cunningham; Sheff	Cunningham; Sheff	2:55
Total length:				47:34

Digital reissue bonus disc
No.	Title	Writer(s)	Producer(s)	Length
1.	"Wipe Your Tears"	Frangipane; Cunningham	Cunningham	1:51
2.	"I'm Not Mad"	Frangipane; Cunningham	Cunningham	2:53
3.	"Be Kind" (with Marshmello)	Frangipane; Allen; Freddy Wexler; Gian Stone; Christopher Comstock	Comstock; Stone	2:53
4.	"Without Me" (remix featuring Juice Wrld)	Frangipane; Timberlake; Mosley; Storch; Bell; Allen; Delacey; Jarad Anthony Higgins	Bell	3:50
5.	"Without Me" (Illenium remix)	Frangipane; Timberlake; Mosley; Storch; Bell; Allen; Delacey	Nicholas D. Miller; Bell	4:08
6.	"Graveyard" (acoustic)	Frangipane; Allen; Bellion; Bell; K. Johnson; S. Johnson; Williams	Frangipane	3:56
7.	"You Should Be Sad" (acoustic)	Frangipane; Kurstin	Frangipane	3:19
8.	"Alanis' Interlude" (Stripped)	Frangipane; Morissette; Farrell; Lacey; Accardi; Lane; Tierney; Sherman	Frangipane	2:31
9.	"Without Me" (Stripped)	Frangipane; Timberlake; Mosley; Storch; Bell; Allen; Delacey	Frangipane	3:03
10.	"Graveyard" (Stripped)	Frangipane; Allen; Bellion; Bell; K. Johnson; S. Johnson; Williams	Frangipane	3:37
11.	"3AM" (Stripped)	Frangipane; Kurstin	Frangipane	3:34
Total length:				83:00

Notes

- ^{^[a]} signifies as an additional producer
- Target exclusive and international deluxe editions included the original voicenote recording of "You Should Be Sad" and "I'm Not Mad" as the bonus tracks.
- Japanese edition featured the International deluxe bonus tracks and also included "Wipe Your Tears" as the bonus tracks.
- Standard vinyl edition excludes "Alanis' Interlude", "Killing Boys", and "Suga's Interlude".
- Song names styling:
  - "Clementine", "3AM", "Killing Boys", and "Wipe Your Tears" are stylized in all lowercase.
  - "You Should Be Sad", "Forever ... (Is a Long Time)", and "Finally // Beautiful Stranger" are stylized in sentence case.
  - "I Hate Everybody" is stylized in all upper case.
  - Suga in "Suga's Interlude" is stylized in all upper case.
- "3AM" includes an uncredited appearance from singer John Mayer, in the form of a voicemail.
- The signed 'Ashley' version of the CD has a misprint in the tracklist. "Alanis' Interlude", "Killing Boys", and "Suga's Interlude" are missing from the back cover but are present on the CD.

Samples

- "Ashley" contains excerpts from the motion picture Eternal Sunshine of the Spotless Mind, performed by Kate Winslet.
- "Without Me" contains interpolations of "Cry Me a River", written by Justin Timberlake, Timothy Mosley, and Scott Storch.
- "Alanis' Interlude" contains a sample of "Fork & Knife (Demo)", performed and written by Brand New.
- "Killing Boys" contains excerpts from the outtake 2009 film Jennifer's Body, performed by Megan Fox and Amanda Seyfried.

== Personnel ==
Credits were adapted from CMG Credits.

=== Performers and musicians ===
- Halsey – vocals (tracks 1–5, 7–16)
- Benny Blanco – keyboards, programming (tracks 1, 5, 7, 12, 14)
- Alex Young – keyboards, programming (track 1)
- Cashmere Cat – keyboards, programming (tracks 1, 5, 7, 14)
- Brenton Duvall – programming (track 1)
- John Cunningham – programming (tracks 2, 12, 19), drums (12), guitar (12, 16)
- Jasper Sheff – drums, piano (track 2); guitar, programming (track 16)
- Amy Allen – background vocals, guitar (track 3)
- Louis Bell – keyboards (track 3), programming (tracks 3, 9, 15)
- The Monsters & Strangerz – keyboards, programming (track 3)
- Jon Bellion – keyboards, programming (track 3)
- Mark Williams – guitar, keyboards, programming (track 3)
- Greg Kurstin – acoustic guitar, bass, electric guitar, mellotron, percussion (tracks 4, 8, 10); drums, lap steel guitar (track 4)
- Happy Perez – guitar, programming (tracks 5, 7, 12); keyboards (tracks 5, 7)
- Lido – programming (tracks 5, 6, 7, 11, 13, 14), keyboards (track 14)
- Dominic Fike – vocals (track 6)
- Finneas – keyboards, programming (track 7)
- Chad Smith – drums (track 8)
- Alanis Morissette – vocals (track 11)
- Suga – rap vocals, programming (track 13)
- Pdogg – programming (track 13)

=== Production ===
- Halsey – executive production
- Benny Blanco – engineering (tracks 1, 5, 7, 12, 14), executive production
- Serban Ghenea – mixing
- Chris Gehringer – mastering
- Will Quinnell – mastering assistance
- John Hanes – engineering
- Alex Young – engineering (track 1)
- John Cunningham – engineering (tracks 2, 16)
- The Monsters & Strangerz – engineering (track 3)
- Louis Bell – engineering (tracks 3, 9)
- Alex Pasco – engineering (tracks 4, 8, 10)
- Greg Kurstin – engineering (tracks 4, 8, 10)
- Julian Burg – engineering (tracks 4, 10)
- Lido – engineering (tracks 6, 11, 13)
- Chris Sclafani – engineering (tracks 7, 12, 14)
- Julian Burg – engineering (track 8)
- Ricardo Gama – recording (track 9)
- Daniel S. Acorsi – recording (track 9)
- Andrew Wells – engineering (track 14)
- Ed Reyes – engineering assistance (tracks 4, 8, 10)
- Scott Moore – engineering assistance (track 8)

=== Design ===
- Garrett Hilliker – art direction
- Arjun Pulijal – product manager
- Katie Spoleti – product manager
- Talisa Gurunian – product manager
- Tony Bisogno – production
- Jill Lamothe – production

== Charts ==
=== Weekly charts ===
Weekly chart positions for Manic
Chart (2020)	Peak position
Argentine Albums (CAPIF)	7
Australian Albums (ARIA)	2
Austrian Albums (Ö3 Austria)	10
Belgian Albums (Ultratop Flanders)	9
Belgian Albums (Ultratop Wallonia)	29
Canadian Albums (Billboard)	2
Czech Albums (ČNS IFPI)	6
Danish Albums (Hitlisten)	23
Dutch Albums (Album Top 100)	11
Estonian Albums (Eesti Ekspress)	4
Finnish Albums (Suomen virallinen lista)	6
French Albums (SNEP)	34
German Albums (Offizielle Top 100)	13
Irish Albums (Official Charts)	8
Italian Albums (FIMI)	12
Japan Hot Albums (Billboard Japan)	57
Japanese Albums (Oricon)	83
Mexican Albums (AMPROFON)	6
New Zealand Albums (RMNZ)	4
Norwegian Albums (VG-lista)	12
Polish Albums (ZPAV)	15
Portuguese Albums (AFP)	22
Scottish Albums (Official Charts)	5
Slovak Albums (ČNS IFPI)	3
Spanish Albums (PROMUSICAE)	6
Swedish Albums (Sverigetopplistan)	27
Swiss Albums (Schweizer Hitparade)	10
UK Albums (Official Charts)	6
US Billboard 200	2
US Indie Store Album Sales (Billboard)	1

=== Year-end charts ===
2020 year-end chart performance for Manic
Chart (2020)	Position
Australian Albums (ARIA)	21
Belgian Albums (Ultratop Flanders)	104
Canadian Albums (Billboard)	22
Danish Albums (Hitlisten)	92
US Billboard 200	27

2021 year-end chart performance for Manic
Chart (2021)	Position
Australian Albums (ARIA)	80
US Billboard 200	93

== Certifications ==
Certifications for Manic
Region	Certification	Certified units/sales
Argentina (CAPIF)	5× Platinum	100,000^{^}
Australia (ARIA)	Gold	35,000^{‡}
Brazil (Pro-Música Brasil)	Diamond	160,000^{‡}
Canada (Music Canada)	2× Platinum	160,000^{‡}
Denmark (IFPI Danmark)	Gold	10,000^{‡}
Mexico (AMPROFON)	Platinum	60,000^{‡}
Netherlands (NVPI)	Gold	20,000^{‡}
New Zealand (RMNZ)	2× Platinum	30,000^{‡}
Norway (IFPI Norway)	Platinum	20,000^{‡}
Poland (ZPAV)	Platinum	20,000^{‡}
Singapore (RIAS)	Platinum	10,000^{*}
United Kingdom (BPI)	Gold	100,000^{‡}
United States (RIAA)	2× Platinum	2,000,000^{‡}
^{*} Sales figures based on certification alone.^{^} Shipments figures based on certification alone.^{‡} Sales+streaming figures based on certification alone.

== Release history ==
Release formats for Manic
Country	Date	Format	Version	Label	Ref.
Various	January 17, 2020	CD; digital download; streaming	Standard	Capitol	
Various	January 17, 2020	LP	Standard	Capitol	
Various	February 14, 2020	Cassette	Standard	Capitol	
Various	September 11, 2020	Double LP	Standard	Capitol	
Various	September 29, 2020	Digital download; streaming	Deluxe	Capitol	
