= Finally // Beautiful Stranger =

2019 promotional single by Halsey

Promotional single by Halsey

from the album Manic
- B-side: "Suga's Interlude"
- Released: December 6, 2019
- Genre: Country rock
- Length: 3:41
- Label: Capitol
- Songwriters: Ashley Frangipane; Greg Kurstin
- Producer: Greg Kurstin

Music video
- "Finally // Beautiful Stranger" on YouTube

"Finally // Beautiful Stranger" is a song by American singer Halsey. It was released through Capitol Records on December 6, 2019, alongside "Suga's Interlude" as promotional singles from Halsey's third studio album, Manic (2020). On January 25, 2020, Halsey performed "Finally // Beautiful Stranger" on Saturday Night Live.

== Background ==
The song was announced on December 3, 2019 through social media. In an Instagram livestream on December 3, 2019 Halsey announced that she was releasing two new songs and a music video on Friday December 6, 2019. On December 5, 2019 she revealed that those two songs are "Finally // Beautiful Stranger" and "Suga's Interlude". Halsey described both songs as "very different [...] very dreamy stories." She revealed in an interview with Zane Lowe for Beats 1 that she wrote it at home in her living room at "two in the morning when I was dating Dom," thinking about the night that they met, written with just her voice and a guitar at first. She said that, after listening, her friends described it as "the best song I'd ever written".

== Critical reception ==
Koltan Greenwood from Alternative Press described the song as a "moving, emotional song that explores first love and the emotions it causes". Nina Corcoran of Consequence of Sound labeled the chorus the "real highlight", as Halsey "belts the title with some heartbreaking voice cracks". Madeline Roth, writing for MTV News, described the track as a whole as a "country-tinged, guitar-led love song", noting that it sounded "a bit like Lady Gaga's 'You and I'". In an article for E! News, Billy Nilles noted the track as a "true standout" and described the production as "stripped-back" with "gentle guitar" and as a "country-kissed little number that lets her vulnerabilities take center stage as she sings about first love". Lexi Lane from Atwood Magazine praised the song and its lyrics, stating that the track puts "Halsey's songwriting talents to the forefront and is arguably her strongest song lyrically" and called the song as a whole "well-crafted".

== Music video ==
A music video for the song was released on December 6, 2019. The video was directed by Patrick Tracy and showcases Halsey performing the song on a guitar in two different bar settings. As of June 2021, it has over 22 million views on YouTube.

== Charts ==
Chart (2019)	Peak position
New Zealand Hot Singles (RMNZ)	11
US Bubbling Under Hot 100 (Billboard)	17
US Digital Song Sales (Billboard)	24
US Pop Digital Song Sales (Billboard)	19

== Certifications ==
Region	Certification	Certified units/sales
Brazil (Pro-Música Brasil)	Gold	20,000^{‡}
New Zealand (RMNZ)	Gold	15,000^{‡}
United States (RIAA)	Gold	500,000^{‡}
^{‡} Sales+streaming figures based on certification alone.

== Release history ==
Region	Date	Format	Label	Ref
Various	December 6, 2019	Digital download, streaming	Capitol	
