= Graveyard (song) =

2019 single by Halsey

Single by Halsey

from the album Manic
- Released: September 13, 2019
- Genre: Pop; electropop
- Length: 3:01
- Label: Capitol
- Songwriters: Ashley Frangipane; Amy Allen; Jonathan Bellion; Louis Bell; Jordan K. Johnson; Stefan Johnson; Mark "Oji" Williams
- Producers: The Monsters & Strangerz; Jon Bellion; Ojivolta; Louis Bell

Halsey singles chronology
"Nightmare" (2019)	"Graveyard" (2019)	"You Should Be Sad" (2020)

Alternative cover
- Axwell remix cover

Music video
- "Graveyard" on YouTube

"Graveyard" is a song by American singer Halsey. It was released on September 13, 2019, through Capitol Records as the second single from her third studio album, Manic (2020). It reached the Top 40 in fifteen countries worldwide and is certified double platinum in the United States, Brazil, Canada, and Australia.

== Background and promotion ==
In March 2019, Halsey announced that her upcoming third studio album would be released in 2019 and that she wants it to be "perfect". On September 3, 2019, Halsey revealed the cover art and release date of "Graveyard" on her social media. The announcement was made a day after fans questioned the singer about upcoming news. The song was made available for pre-save upon announcement. Halsey performed the song for the first time on September 11, 2019, as one of the musical guests on Rihanna's "Savage X Fenty" show. She posted a teaser containing a still from the music video as well as a line from the song on her social media that same day.

== Composition ==
"Graveyard" is a pop and electropop song written by Halsey with Amy Allen, Jon Bellion, Jordan K. Johnson, Louis Bell, Mark Williams and Stefan Johnson. Its production was done by Bellion, Bell, Ojivolta and The Monsters and the Strangerz. According to Halsey, the song "is about being in love with someone who is in a bad place and loving them so much that you don't realize that you're going to that bad place with them". It also deals with the topic of caring for yourself instead of following others.

== Critical reception ==
Althea Legaspi and Brittany Spanos of Rolling Stone wrote that the song's lyrical content "addresses following a relationship down a dark road despite warning signs" and noted the "contemplative guitar melody". Rania Aniftos at Billboard referred to the song as an "emotional tune". Writing for Idolator, Mike Nied complimented the song for being "self-aware, vulnerable and very relatable" and pointed out Jon Bellion's obvious presence on its production, calling it a "a lush pop production".

== Music video ==
The song release was supported by a time-lapse visualizer of Halsey painting a self-portrait which also serves as the album cover for Manic. The official music video was released on October 8, 2019, and was directed by Anton Tammi. It features Halsey and a mysterious girl (Sydney Sweeney) magically from her notebook dancing alone in an amusement park. When the bridge starts, the mysterious girl disappears while Halsey enters an aquarium, which looks similar to the video for her song, "Clementine". Immediately, she wakes up into a white abandoned version of the park, later teleporting to her bedroom of the same color.

== Live performances ==
Halsey performed "Graveyard" for the first time at the 2019 MTV Europe Music Awards on November 3, 2019; also during the 47th American Music Awards ceremony on November 24 and the Australian ARIA Music Awards of 2019 on November 27.

List of televised performances

- September 19, 2019 – Savage X Fenty Fashion Show
- September 30, 2019 – iHeartRadio Music Festival
- October 28, 2019 – The Ellen DeGeneres Show
- October 30, 2019 – Idol Sverige
- November 2, 2019 – MTV Europe Music Awards
- November 12, 2019 – Country Music Association Awards (with Lady A)
- November 15, 2019 – The Jonathan Ross Show
- November 24, 2019 – American Music Awards
- November 26, 2019 – Australian Recording Industry Association Music Awards
- December 9, 2019 – Pandora Live concert
- March 25, 2020 – CMT Crossroads (with Kelsea Ballerini)

== Other uses ==
The song appears on the US edition of Now That's What I Call Music! 73, marking the first appearance for Halsey in the US Now! series.

== Credits and personnel ==
Credits adapted from Tidal and Spotify.

- Halsey – vocals, songwriting
- Ojivolta – production
- Louis Bell – production, songwriting, record engineering, programming, keyboards
- Jon Bellion – production, songwriting, keyboards, programming
- Amy Allen – songwriting, background vocals, guitar
- Mark Williams – production, songwriting, guitar, keyboards, programming
- The Monsters and the Strangerz – production, songwriting, engineering, keyboards, programming
- Chris Gehringer – mastering engineering
- John Hanes – mixing engineering
- Serban Ghenea – mixing

== Charts ==
=== Weekly charts ===
Chart (2019–2020)	Peak position
Australia (ARIA)	24
Belgium (Ultratip Bubbling Under Flanders)	7
Belgium (Ultratip Bubbling Under Wallonia)	23
Canada Hot 100 (Billboard)	38
Canada CHR/Top 40 (Billboard)	15
Canada Hot AC (Billboard)	25
Czech Republic Airplay (ČNS IFPI)	15
Czech Republic Singles Digital (ČNS IFPI)	36
Estonia (Eesti Ekspress)	26
Hungary (Stream Top 40)	24
Ireland (IRMA)	30
Latvia (LAIPA)	22
Lithuania (AGATA)	20
Mexico Ingles Airplay (Billboard)	35
Netherlands (Single Top 100)	60
New Zealand (Recorded Music NZ)	27
Portugal (AFP)	75
Romania (Airplay 100)	93
Scottish Singles Sales (Official Charts)	48
Singapore (RIAS)	18
Slovakia Singles Digital (ČNS IFPI)	33
Sweden (Sverigetopplistan)	95
Switzerland (Schweizer Hitparade)	75
UK Singles (Official Charts)	29
US Billboard Hot 100	34
US Adult Pop Airplay (Billboard)	16
US Dance Airplay (Billboard)	24
US Dance Club Songs (Billboard)	1
US Pop Airplay (Billboard)	10
US Rolling Stone Top 100	25

=== Year-end charts ===
Chart (2020)	Position
US Mainstream Top 40 (Billboard)	48

== Certifications ==
Region	Certification	Certified units/sales
Australia (ARIA)	2× Platinum	140,000^{‡}
Brazil (Pro-Música Brasil)	2× Platinum	80,000^{‡}
Canada (Music Canada)	2× Platinum	160,000^{‡}
Mexico (AMPROFON)	Gold	30,000^{‡}
New Zealand (RMNZ)	Platinum	30,000^{‡}
Norway (IFPI Norway)	Gold	30,000^{‡}
Poland (ZPAV)	Gold	25,000^{‡}
Portugal (AFP)	Gold	5,000^{‡}
United Kingdom (BPI)	Silver	200,000^{‡}
United States (RIAA)	3× Platinum	3,000,000^{‡}
Streaming
Sweden (GLF)	Gold	4,000,000^{†}
^{‡} Sales+streaming figures based on certification alone.^{†} Streaming-only figures based on certification alone.

== Release history ==
Region	Date	Format	Version	Label	Ref.
Various	September 13, 2019	Digital download; streaming	Original	Capitol	
Australia	September 13, 2019	Contemporary hit radio	Original	Capitol	
United Kingdom	September 14, 2019	Contemporary hit radio	Original	Capitol	
United States	September 17, 2019	Contemporary hit radio	Original	Capitol	
United States	September 30, 2019	Hot adult contemporary	Original	Capitol	
Various	October 31, 2019	Digital download; streaming	Axwell Remix	Capitol	
Various	November 12, 2019	Digital download; streaming	Acoustic	Capitol	

== See also ==
- List of Billboard number-one dance songs of 2020
