= Clementine (Halsey song) =

2019 promotional single by Halsey

Promotional single by Halsey

from the album Manic
- Released: September 29, 2019
- Length: 3:54
- Label: Capitol
- Songwriters: Ashley Frangipane; Jasper Sheff; Jonathan Carter Cunningham
- Producers: John Cunningham; Halsey

Music video
- "Clementine" on YouTube

"Clementine" is a song by American singer Halsey. It was released on September 29, 2019, her twenty-fifth birthday, through Capitol Records as the first promotional single from her third studio album, Manic (2020).

== Background and composition ==
Written by Halsey, Jasper Sheff and Johnathan Carter Cunnigham, "Clementine" is a "stripped-back track, driven by simple piano tinkling and some subtle clunking for percussion". Halsey released the song on her twenty-fifth birthday.

== Critical reception ==
Whitney Shoemaker from Alternative Press wrote that "Halsey strips things down in her raw new track". Mike Nied of Idolator wrote that the track "finds her at her most poetic over sparse keys", while writing that the song "doesn't exactly scream radio hit".

== Music video ==
The music video for "Clementine" was released with the song on September 29, 2019. The video shows Halsey and her brother Sévian performing interpretive dance in an aquarium. The video was directed by Anton Tammi and Dani Vitale who also did the choreography.

== Credits and personnel ==
Credits adapted from Tidal.

- Halsey – producer, songwriting, vocals
- John Cunnigham – producer, songwriting, programming
- Jasper Sheff – songwriting
- Serban Ghenea – mixer, studio personnel
- John Hanes – mix engineer, studio personnel
- Chris Gehringer – mastering engineer, studio personnel
- Will Quinnell – assistant mastering engineer, studio personnel
- Aria McKnight – A&R
- Jeremy Vuernick – A&R
- Ryan Del Vecchio – A&R Admin

== Release history ==
Region	Date	Format	Label	Ref
Various	September 29, 2019	Digital download, streaming	Capitol	
