= Nightmare (Halsey song) =

2019 single by Halsey

Single by Halsey
- Released: May 17, 2019
- Recorded: 2019
- Genre: Pop; industrial; nu metal; alternative rock
- Length: 3:52
- Label: Capitol
- Composers: Benjamin Levin; Elena Kiper; Magnus Høiberg; Ivan Shapovalov; Martin Kierszenbaum; Nathan Perez; Sergio Galoyan; Trevor Horn; Valerij Polienko
- Lyricist: Ashley Frangipane
- Producers: Benny Blanco; Cashmere Cat; Happy Perez

Halsey singles chronology
"Boy with Luv" (2019)	"Nightmare" (2019)	"Graveyard" (2019)

Music video
- "Nightmare" on YouTube

"Nightmare" is a song by American singer Halsey. It was released as a single on May 17, 2019, and was sent to top 40 radio on May 21, 2019, through Capitol Records. The song was written by Halsey along with its producers Benny Blanco, Cashmere Cat, and Happy Perez. The music video, directed by Hannah Lux Davis, accompanied its release the same day. The song was originally intended to be the lead single of their third studio album Manic but was ultimately cut and replaced with "Without Me". It was later added as a bonus track on the extended version of Halsey's fourth studio album, If I Can't Have Love, I Want Power (2021).

== Composition ==
"Nightmare" is described by critics as a "biting" pop, alternative rock, nu metal, and industrial "anthem", with elements of grunge, electro-metal, emo, punk rock, and trap music. It is written in the key A minor with 146 beats per minute. The song contains an interpolation of "All the Things She Said" by Russian duo t.A.T.u. Elena Kiper, one of the songwriters of t.A.T.u's song, posted on her Instagram that an initial version of Halsey's track "contained an extensive interpolation of the original work" but later the sample was changed by G-Eazy, although the latter isn't credited on the work.

== Promotion ==
In May 2019, Halsey posted a link on her social media, directing users to the website "nightma.re" to sign up for email alerts and prompting them to share what their worst nightmare is. The site gave a series of options, and upon clicking one of the options, users would be shown an explanation as to the meaning of that specific nightmare. Fans also believed that the time tickets for her recent intimate concerts went on sale, 5:17 PM, was a hint towards the date new music would be released, although Halsey claimed no knowledge of this and only said new music would be coming "sooner than you think". She then announced the single's release date on Twitter on May 9, 2019, posting a video of her revealing the title at one of her concerts, and captioning it "new single. NIGHTMARE. may 17th". Several days later, Halsey announced she had hidden lyrics of the song in five US cities: Los Angeles, Dallas, Chicago, San Francisco, and New York City.

On May 20, 2019, Halsey performed a free show for fans in Minneapolis, where she performed the single live for the first time, along with "Castle", "Gasoline", "Without Me" and "Don't Play". She uploaded a video of some of the performances on YouTube following the show.

== Music video ==
The music video for "Nightmare" premiered on YouTube on May 16, 2019. Directed by Hannah Lux Davis, the video features appearances by Cara Delevingne, Debbie Harry, Ryan Destiny, and Suki Waterhouse.

== Critical reception ==
The song has received positive reviews. Billboard magazine said the song is musically "unorthodox" containing "stylistic curveballs" and "killer lines" that "exalt autonomy, sexual freedom and self-acceptance". The line "I've been polite, but I won't be caught dead/ Letting a man tell me what I should do in my bed" was noted as a "barbed assault on patriarchal expectation" by Billboard and "a necessary gesture of rage and empowerment" by Rolling Stone. Billboard named it the 17th best song of 2019.

== Credits and personnel ==
Credits adapted from Tidal.

- Halsey – vocals, songwriting
- Benny Blanco – production, songwriting, record engineering, keyboards, programming
- Cashmere Cat – production, songwriting, keyboards, programming
- Happy Perez – production, songwriting, guitar, programming
- Elena Kiper – songwriting
- Ivan Nikolaevich Shapovalov – songwriting
- Martin Kierszenbaum – songwriting
- Sergio Galoyan – songwriting
- Trevor Horn – songwriting
- Valerij Valentinovich Polienko – songwriting
- John Hanes – mixing engineering
- Serban Ghenea – mixing
- Chris Gehringer – mastering engineering

== Awards and nominations ==
Year	Organization	Award	Result	Ref.
2019	Teen Choice Awards	Choice Song: Female	Nominated	
2019	MTV Video Music Awards	Video for Good	Nominated	

== Charts ==
=== Weekly charts ===
Weekly chart performance for "Nightmare"
Chart (2019)	Peak position
Australia (ARIA)	13
Austria (Ö3 Austria Top 40)	56
Belgium (Ultratip Bubbling Under Flanders)	6
Belgium (Ultratip Bubbling Under Wallonia)	28
Canada Hot 100 (Billboard)	17
CIS Airplay (TopHit)	13
Canada CHR/Top 40 (Billboard)	17
Canada Hot AC (Billboard)	38
China Airplay/FL (Billboard)	15
Czech Republic Airplay (ČNS IFPI)	70
Czech Republic Singles Digital (ČNS IFPI)	25
Estonia (Eesti Tipp-40)	15
France (SNEP Sales Chart)	48
Germany (GfK)	87
Hungary (Single Top 40)	9
Hungary (Stream Top 40)	7
Ireland (IRMA)	24
Italy (FIMI)	68
Latvia (LAIPA)	8
Lithuania (AGATA)	15
Mexico Ingles Airplay (Billboard)	4
New Zealand (Recorded Music NZ)	19
Portugal (AFP)	48
Russia Airplay (TopHit)	26
Scottish Singles Sales (Official Charts)	33
Slovakia Singles Digital (ČNS IFPI)	7
Sweden Heatseeker (Sverigetopplistan)	16
Switzerland (Schweizer Hitparade)	61
UK Singles (Official Charts)	26
Ukraine Airplay (TopHit)	48
US Billboard Hot 100	15
US Adult Pop Airplay (Billboard)	21
US Pop Airplay (Billboard)	13
US Dance Airplay (Billboard)	19
US Rolling Stone Top 100	66

=== Year-end charts ===
Year-end chart performance for "Nightmare"
Chart (2019)	Position
CIS (Tophit)	137
Russia Airplay (Tophit)	122

== Certifications ==
Certifications for "Nightmare"
Region	Certification	Certified units/sales
Australia (ARIA)	Platinum	70,000^{‡}
Brazil (Pro-Música Brasil)	2× Platinum	80,000^{‡}
Canada (Music Canada)	Platinum	80,000^{‡}
New Zealand (RMNZ)	Platinum	30,000^{‡}
Poland (ZPAV)	Gold	25,000^{‡}
Switzerland (IFPI Switzerland)	Platinum	20,000^{‡}
United Kingdom (BPI)	Silver	200,000^{‡}
United States (RIAA)	2× Platinum	2,000,000^{‡}
^{‡} Sales+streaming figures based on certification alone.

== Nightmare (Reprise) ==
"Nightmare (Reprise)"

Song by Halsey

from the album If I Can't Have Love, I Want Power (extended edition)
- Label: Capitol
- Producers: Trent Reznor; Atticus Ross

"Nightmare (Reprise)" is a song by Halsey included on the Walmart bonus track edition of her fourth studio album If I Can't Have Love, I Want Power (2021). The song is a re-produced version of "Nightmare" created to match the sound of the album. It was first teased by Walmart when a 25-second snippet of a censored version of the song was posted to their website as promotional material for their Walmart exclusive version of the album. It was later added to the extended edition of the album along with "People Disappear Here" and the original "Nightmare".

== Release history ==
Release dates and formats for "Nightmare"
Region	Date	Format	Label	Ref.
Various	May 17, 2019	Digital download; streaming	Capitol	
United States	May 21, 2019	Contemporary hit radio	Capitol	
Italy	May 24, 2019	Contemporary hit radio	Universal	
