= You Should Be Sad =

2020 single by Halsey

Single by Halsey

from the album Manic
- Released: January 10, 2020
- Genre: Country pop
- Length: 3:25
- Label: Capitol
- Songwriters: Ashley Frangipane; Greg Kurstin
- Producer: Greg Kurstin

Halsey singles chronology
"Graveyard" (2019)	"You Should Be Sad" (2020)	"Experiment on Me" (2020)

Music video
- "You Should Be Sad" on YouTube

"You Should Be Sad" (stylized in sentence case) is a song recorded by American singer Halsey. It was released on January 10, 2020, through Capitol Records as the third single from their third studio album, Manic (2020). Halsey wrote the song with their producer Greg Kurstin. "You Should Be Sad" is a country pop ballad that features lyrics about a breakup and an unfaithful ex-lover.

Upon its release, the song was met with critical acclaim, with many critics praising its lyrics. In the US, the song peaked at number twenty six on the Billboard Hot 100, becoming the album's second highest-charting single on the Hot 100. It entered the top ten in Australia and Ireland, while reaching the top 20 in Austria, the Czech Republic, Hungary, Scotland, Singapore and the United Kingdom.

The music video for "You Should Be Sad" was directed by Colin Tilley. Premiering on January 10, 2020, the video depicts Halsey going to "an underground country western nightclub, where a lot of beautiful people are line-dancin". The video was met with mixed reviews.

== Background ==
Halsey revealed that they wrote the song in their living room floor, as well in Nashville, and stated that "the most petty and heartbreaking songs all come from country". When talking about the inspiration for the outfits, Halsey confirmed a number of artists, writing, "Xtina, Gaga, Carrie, and of course Shania, this was one loaded with nods to badass idols of mine. Had the vision to do a 'Before He Cheats' but instead about after he does haha".

== Composition ==
Musically, "You Should Be Sad" is a three minutes and twenty-five seconds acoustic-driven country pop ballad. In terms of music notation, "You Should Be Sad" was composed using 4/4 common time in the key of B minor, with a tempo of 120 beats per minute. The song follows the chord progression of Bm-G-D-F♯m/D-G-D-A. Halsey's vocal range spans from the low note A3 to the high note of E5, giving the song two octaves and four notes of range.

Lyrically, "You Should Be Sad" is a breakup song about an unfaithful ex-lover.

== Critical reception ==
Tom Breihan from Stereogum described the song as a "big, pissed-off ballad directed at an ex", while speculating G-Eazy as the subject of the track. Writing for Vulture, Bethy Squires called the song a "devastating song to do for karaoke in front of an ex". Kaitlin Reilly of Refinery29 wrote that the track was a "country breakup song" that lyrically "holds nothing back, guaranteeing the song a place on every post-breakup playlist". Micheal Love Michael from Paper Magazine praised Halsey for being "brave enough to write about it in public", and felt that the lyrics were about "a toxic lover that [Halsey] escaped from". Aidan Cullen from Billboard wrote about how the song plays on "country-western motifs to bring rootsy weight to Halsey's verbal revenge". Cullen continued with the Tiësto remix of the song, and wrote that the remix "turns up their twang with an ampilified bpm and a big-room blast of a hook" and called the remix a "great warm-up" to Halsey's Manic Tour.

== Commercial performance ==
The song peaked at number 26 on the Billboard Hot 100, and reached the top 20 on the record charts of several countries, including Australia, Austria, Czech Republic, Denmark, Hungary, Ireland, and Scotland. On the first week of the song's release, the song was played 1,692 times on the Mediabase pop radio. On the week of January 19, 2020, the song was played 4,691 times, reaching number 18 on the Mediabase pop chart. With 997,990 daily streams in the US, the song reached number 10 on the US Spotify Streaming Chart on January 21, 2020.

== Music video ==
A music video for the song was released alongside the track on January 10, 2020. The video was directed by Colin Tilley. The video depicts Halsey going to "an underground country western nightclub, where a lot of beautiful people are line-dancin". The video makes references to several artists such as Lady Gaga, Shania Twain, Carrie Underwood and Christina Aguilera (notably, her "Dirrty" video).

=== Critical reception ===
Upon release, the video received mixed reviews. Tom Breihan of Stereogum called the video "completely ridiculous" though he praised the homage to Shania Twain's "That Don't Impress Me Much". Stephen Daw of Billboard was more positive in his review, praising the pop culture references to Twain and Lady Gaga's American Horror Story: Hotel character, The Countess. In an interview with Billboard on the red carpet of the 62nd Annual Grammy Awards, Shania Twain commented on the styles that "channels some of Twain's iconic fashion looks", stating that it made her "warm and fuzzy" and felt "flattered", in addition to being "excited to know that they were on the minds of the young artists coming up who appreciated what they were doing at the time".

== Other performers ==
For the Season 13 finale of RuPaul's Drag Race, Utica Queen performed the song as a lipsync, dressed in a black bodysuit and cowboy hat while tied up and surrounded by string. In the video, Utica uses scissors to dramatically cut the strings around her as she lipsyncs.

== Track listing ==
Digital download / streaming

1. "You Should Be Sad" – 3:25

Digital download / streaming – Tiësto remix

1. "You Should Be Sad" (Tiësto remix) – 2:25

Digital download / streaming – Acoustic

1. "You Should Be Sad" (Acoustic) – 3:18

Digital download / streaming – Remixes

1. "You Should Be Sad" (Mike Mago remix) – 3:26
2. "You Should Be Sad" (Tiësto remix) – 2:25

== Charts ==
=== Weekly charts ===
Chart (2020)	Peak position
Australia (ARIA)	4
Austria (Ö3 Austria Top 40)	17
Belgium (Ultratop 50 Flanders)	24
Belgium (Ultratip Bubbling Under Wallonia)	2
Bolivia (Monitor Latino)	9
Canada Hot 100 (Billboard)	21
Czech Republic Airplay (ČNS IFPI)	9
Czech Republic Singles Digital (ČNS IFPI)	18
Denmark (Tracklisten)	38
France (SNEP)	133
Germany (GfK)	43
Hungary (Editors' Choice Top 40)	36
Hungary (Stream Top 40)	11
Ireland (IRMA)	5
Italy (FIMI)	83
Japan Hot 100 (Billboard)	44
Lithuania (AGATA)	17
Mexico Ingles Airplay (Billboard)	22
Netherlands (Single Top 100)	50
New Zealand (Recorded Music NZ)	23
Norway (VG-lista)	36
Portugal (AFP)	57
Romania (Airplay 100)	58
Scottish Singles Sales (Official Charts)	14
Singapore (RIAS)	18
Slovakia Airplay (ČNS IFPI)	67
Slovakia Singles Digital (ČNS IFPI)	27
Slovenia (SloTop50)	17
Sweden (Sverigetopplistan)	44
Switzerland (Schweizer Hitparade)	32
UK Singles (Official Charts)	12
Ukraine Airplay (TopHit) Tiesto Remix	39
US Billboard Hot 100	26
US Adult Pop Airplay (Billboard)	16
US Dance Airplay (Billboard)	32
US Pop Airplay (Billboard)	13
US Rolling Stone Top 100	15

=== Year-end charts ===
Chart (2020)	Position
Australia (ARIA)	15
Belgium (Ultratop Flanders)	100
Canada (Canadian Hot 100)	50
Hungary (Stream Top 40)	84
Ireland (IRMA)	31
Switzerland (Schweizer Hitparade)	92
UK Singles (OCC)	44
US Billboard Hot 100	82
US Mainstream Top 40 (Billboard)	47

== Certifications ==
Certifications for "You Should Be Sad"
Region	Certification	Certified units/sales
Australia (ARIA)	Platinum	70,000^{‡}
Brazil (Pro-Música Brasil)	3× Platinum	120,000^{‡}
Canada (Music Canada)	3× Platinum	240,000^{‡}
Denmark (IFPI Danmark)	Gold	45,000^{‡}
Germany (BVMI)	Gold	200,000^{‡}
Italy (FIMI)	Gold	35,000^{‡}
Mexico (AMPROFON)	Gold	30,000^{‡}
New Zealand (RMNZ)	2× Platinum	60,000^{‡}
Norway (IFPI Norway)	Gold	30,000^{‡}
Poland (ZPAV)	Platinum	50,000^{‡}
Portugal (AFP)	Gold	5,000^{‡}
United Kingdom (BPI)	Platinum	600,000^{‡}
United States (RIAA)	4× Platinum	4,000,000^{‡}
Streaming
Sweden (GLF)	Gold	4,000,000^{†}
^{‡} Sales+streaming figures based on certification alone.^{†} Streaming-only figures based on certification alone.

== Release history ==
Region	Date	Format(s)	Version	Label	Ref.
Various	January 10, 2020	Digital download; streaming	Original	Capitol	
United States	January 14, 2020	Contemporary hit radio	Original	Capitol	
Italy	January 17, 2020	Radio airplay	Original	Universal	
Various	February 14, 2020	Digital download; streaming	Tiësto remix	Capitol	
Italy	February 14, 2020	Radio airplay	Tiësto remix	Universal	
Various	February 28, 2020	Digital download; streaming	Acoustic	Capitol	
Various	March 13, 2020	Digital download; streaming	Remixes	Capitol	
