= Halsey discography =

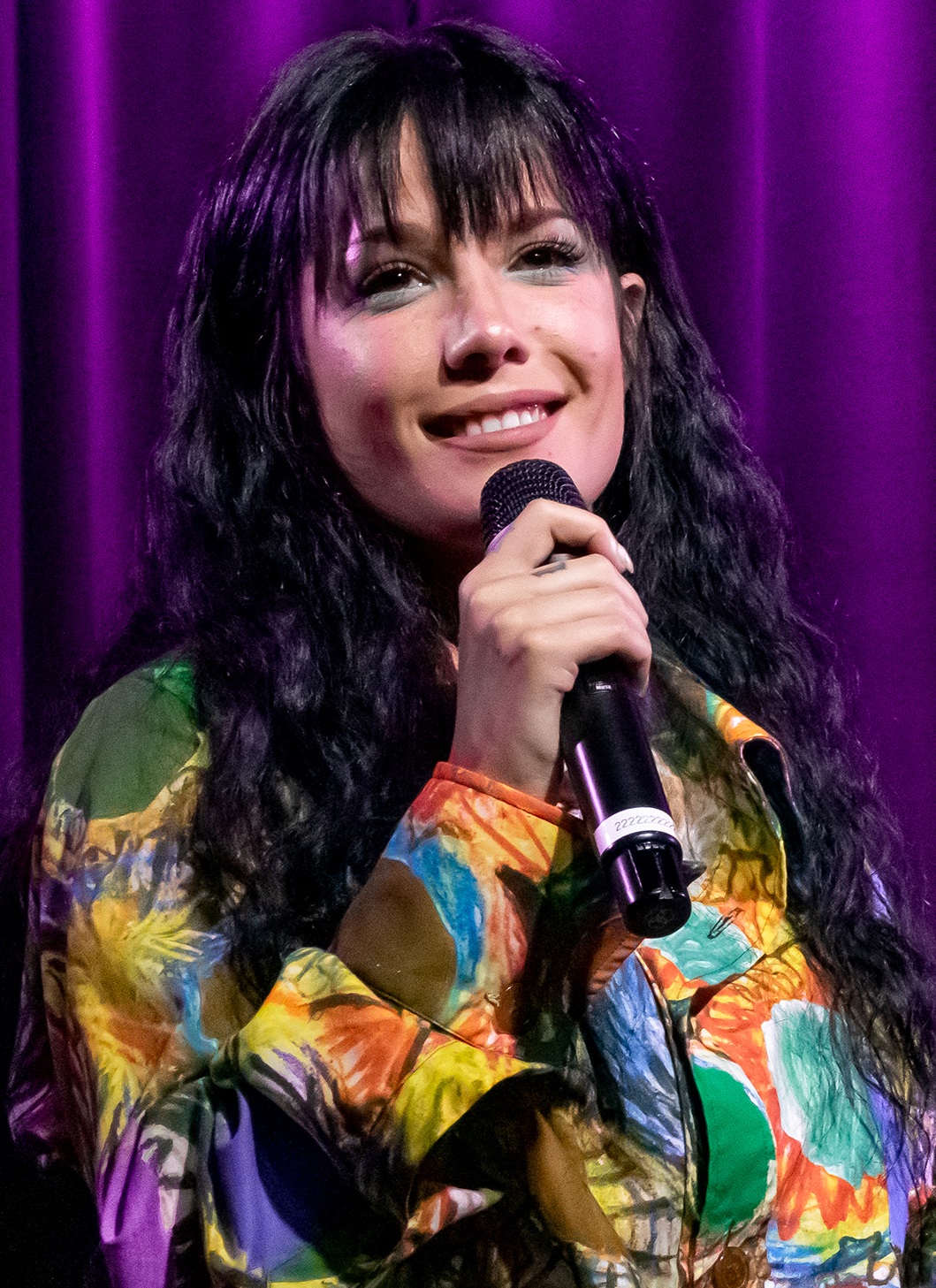
- Halsey in 2019
- Studio albums: 5
- EPs: 14
- Live albums: 3
- Singles: 29
- Music videos: 36
- Promotional singles: 10
- Guest appearances: 10

American singer and songwriter Halsey has released five studio albums, three live albums, 14 extended plays (including one standard EP, seven compilation EPs, four remix EPs, and two live session EPs), 28 singles (including three as a featured artist), 10 promotional singles, and 36 music videos. After being signed to Astralwerks, she released her debut EP Room 93 on October 27, 2014, and then toured with larger acts to promote it and her upcoming album. Since her debut, Halsey has released nine Gold, 11 Platinum, seven Multiplatinum, and one Diamond single in the United States alone.

Shortly after making her debut, Halsey earned her first chart entry on the US Billboard Hot 100 songs chart with the single "New Americana", which reached number 60 and served as the lead single for her debut studio album Badlands (2015). Badlands debuted at number two on the Billboard 200 albums chart in the United States with 115,000 equivalent sales with also reaching to the top ten in Australia, Canada, the United Kingdom, and several other countries. Since its release it has been certified 2× Platinum in the US, Platinum in Canada and Norway, and Gold in Australia and Denmark. The album was followed by two more singles, "Colors", and a re-recorded version of the song "Castle" for the soundtrack of the 2016 film The Huntsman: Winter's War. The following year Halsey found extreme success as a featured vocalist on "Closer", a collaboration with the Chainsmokers. It topped the Billboard Hot 100 for 12 consecutive weeks while topping the charts of over 20 other countries, has sold more than 15 million units worldwide, and earned Halsey a Grammy Award nomination for Best Pop Duo/Group Performance.

Halsey's follow up album, Hopeless Fountain Kingdom (2017), debuted at number one in the US with 106,000 sales in its first week, becoming her first number one album. It additionally debuted at number one in Canada and reached the top ten in Australia, Ireland, and New Zealand and was certified Platinum in the US, Canada, and Norway, Gold in Denmark, and Silver in the UK. All of the album's singles charted in the US with its lead single, "Now or Never" reaching number 17, "Bad at Love" at number five, and "Alone" at number 66.

In July 2018, Halsey sang with Khalid on Benny Blanco's debut single "Eastside", which topped the charts of five countries and peaked at number nine in the US. It went on to spend over a year charting on the Hot 100 and has sold over three million units worldwide. In October of the same year, Halsey released "Without Me", which became one of her biggest songs to date, reaching the top three of several countries' music charts as well as topping the Billboard Hot 100 for two non-consecutive weeks. It has sold over 15 million units worldwide and ranked at number 12 on Billboard magazine's Decade End chart for the 2010s. It would later serve as the lead single for Halsey's third studio album, Manic (2020). Manic debuted at number two on the Billboard 200 with 239,000 in equivalent-album sales in its first week of release, making it the biggest album debut of Halsey's career. It also reached the top ten in Australia, Belgium, Canada, Ireland, New Zealand, and the UK. In the US, Manic became the most streamed female album of the year and the first Recording Industry Association of America (RIAA) certified Platinum album of 2020. The album was preceded by the release of the singles "Graveyard" and "You Should Be Sad", which peaked at number 34 and 26 in the US, respectively.

== Albums ==
=== Studio albums ===
List of studio albums, with selected details, chart positions, sales figures and certifications
Title	Details	Peak chart positions										Sales	Certifications
Title	Details	US	AUS	BEL (FL)	CAN	IRE	NL	NOR	NZ	SWE	UK	Sales	Certifications
Badlands	Release: August 28, 2015; Label: Astralwerks; Formats: CD, CS, DL, LP, streaming	2	2	10	3	3	5	22	3	13	9	US: 626,000; UK: 106,804	RIAA: 2× Platinum; ARIA: Platinum; BPI: Gold; GLF: Gold; IFPI NOR: Platinum; MC: 2× Platinum; RMNZ: Platinum
Hopeless Fountain Kingdom	Release: June 2, 2017; Label: Astralwerks; Formats: CD, DL, LP, streaming	1	2	14	1	7	15	11	6	27	12	US: 251,000	RIAA: 2× Platinum; ARIA: Platinum; BPI: Gold; GLF: Gold; IFPI NOR: Platinum; MC: Platinum; RMNZ: 2× Platinum
Manic	Released: January 17, 2020; Label: Capitol; Formats: CD, LP, DL, streaming	2	2	9	2	8	11	11	4	23	6	US: 330,300	RIAA: 2× Platinum; ARIA: Gold; BPI: Gold; IFPI NOR: Platinum; MC: 2× Platinum; NVPI: Gold; RMNZ: 2× Platinum
If I Can't Have Love, I Want Power	Released: August 27, 2021; Label: Capitol; Formats: Box set, CD, CS, DL, LP, streaming	2	3	4	5	6	6	9	5	24	5	US: 70,500	RIAA: Gold
The Great Impersonator	Released: October 25, 2024; Label: Columbia; Formats: CD, CS, DL, LP, streaming	2	17	54	20	76	68	—	33	—	19		

=== Reissue albums ===
List of reissue albums with selected details
Title	Details
Badlands (Decade Edition Anthology)	Released: August 29, 2025; Label: Capitol; Formats: CD, DL, LP, streaming

=== Live albums ===
List of live albums with selected details
Title	Details
Badlands (Live from Webster Hall)	Release: August 28, 2020; Label: Capitol; Formats: DL, streaming
Hopeless Fountain Kingdom (Live from Webster Hall)	Release: June 24, 2022; Label: Capitol; Formats: DL, streaming
The Girl in the Tower - Live	Release: September 29, 2026; Formats: DL, streaming

== Extended plays ==
Title	Details	Peak chart positions			Sales
Title	Details	US	US Alt.	US Heat	Sales
Room 93	Release: October 27, 2014; Label: Astralwerks; Formats: CD, DL, 12" vinyl, streaming; Track listing: 1. "Is There Somewhere"; 2. "Ghost (Room 93 Version)"; 3. "Hurricane"; 4. "Empty Gold"; 5. "Trouble (Stripped)"	159	20	3	US: 97,000

=== Compilation extended plays ===
Title	Details
Collabs	Release: July 31, 2020; Label: Capitol; Formats: DL, streaming; Track listing: 1. "Dominic's Interlude" (with Dominic Fike); 2. "Suga's Interlude" (with Suga); 3. "Alanis' Interlude" (with Alanis Morissette); 4. "Without Me (Remix)" (with Juice Wrld); 5. "Life's a Mess" (with Juice Wrld); 6. "Be Kind" (with Marshmello)
Manic: Revenge EP	Release: November 13, 2020; Label: Capitol; Formats: DL, streaming
Manic: Confessional EP	Release: November 20, 2020; Label: Capitol; Formats: DL, streaming
Manic: Is She Like, You Know... EP	Release: December 4, 2020; Label: Capitol; Formats: DL, streaming
Manic: ...Or Are You Normal EP	Release: December 11, 2020; Label: Capitol; Formats: DL, streaming
Love and Power EP: Love	Release: December 21, 2021; Label: Capitol; Formats: DL, streaming
Love and Power EP: Power	Release: December 31, 2021; Label: Capitol; Formats: DL, streaming

=== Remix extended plays ===
Title	Details
Room 93: The Remixes	Release: March 3, 2015; Label: Astralwerks; Formats: DL, streaming
Complementary Colors	Release: April 22, 2016; Label: Astralwerks; Formats: DL, streaming
Bad at Love (Remixes)	Release: October 6, 2017; Label: Astralwerks; Formats: DL, streaming
I Am Not a Woman, I'm a God (Remixes)	Release: September 30, 2021; Label: Capitol; Formats: DL, streaming

=== Live extended plays ===
Title	Details
Room 93: 1 Mic 1 Take	Release: March 17, 2015; Label: Astralwerks; Formats: DL, streaming
Spotify Sessions (Live from Spotify NYC)	Release: November 20, 2015; Label: Astralwerks; Formats: DL, streaming

== Singles ==
=== As lead artist ===
List of singles as lead artist, showing year released, selected chart positions, certifications and originating album
Title	Year	Peak chart positions										Certifications	Album
Title	Year	US	AUS	BEL (FL)	CAN	IRE	ITA	NOR	NZ	SWE	UK	Certifications	Album
"Ghost"	2014	—	—	—	—	—	—	—	—	—	—	RIAA: Platinum; ARIA: Gold; RMNZ: Gold	Room 93 and Badlands
"New Americana"	2015	60	—	— (Note: "New Americana" did not enter the Flemish Ultratop 50, but peaked at number 84 on the Ultratip chart.)	57	89	24	—	— (Note: "New Americana" did not enter the NZ Top 40 Singles Chart, but peaked at number one on the NZ Heatseeker Singles Chart.)	—	184	RIAA: 2× Platinum; ARIA: Gold; BPI: Silver; FIMI: Platinum; GLF: Gold; IFPI NOR: Gold; MC: Platinum; RMNZ: Platinum	Badlands
"Colors"	2016	— (Note: "Colors" did not enter the Billboard Hot 100, but peaked at number 8 on the Bubbling Under Hot 100 Singles chart.)	99	—	—	—	—	—	—	—	—	RIAA: 3× Platinum; ARIA: Gold; BPI: Gold; GLF: Gold; RMNZ: Platinum	Badlands
"Castle" (The Huntsman: Winter's War version)	2016	— (Note: "Castle" did not enter the Billboard Hot 100, but peaked at number 1 on the Bubbling Under Hot 100 Singles chart.)	76	—	—	—	—	—	—	—	— (Note: "Castle" did not enter the Official UK Singles Chart, but did peak at number 85 on the UK Downloads component sales chart.)	RIAA: 2× Platinum; ARIA: Gold; BPI: Silver; RMNZ: Gold	Badlands and The Huntsman: Winter's War
"Not Afraid Anymore"	2017	77	55	—	72	—	—	—	— (Note: "Not Afraid Anymore" did not enter the NZ Top 40 Singles Chart, but peaked at number one on the NZ Heatseeker Singles Chart.)	—	—	RIAA: Gold	Fifty Shades Darker
"Now or Never"	2017	17	16	— (Note: "Now or Never" did not enter the Flemish Ultratop 50, but peaked at number 24 on the Ultratip chart.)	32	42	55	—	22	61	80	RIAA: 4× Platinum; ARIA: 2× Platinum; BPI: Silver; FIMI: Gold; GLF: Gold; IFPI NOR: Gold; MC: Platinum; RMNZ: 2× Platinum	Hopeless Fountain Kingdom
"Bad at Love"	2017	5	42	—	22	—	—	—	— (Note: "Bad at Love" did not enter the NZ Top 40 Singles Chart, but peaked at number seven on the NZ Heatseeker Singles Chart.)	—	—	RIAA: Diamond; ARIA: Platinum; BPI: Platinum; GLF: Gold; MC: 3× Platinum; RMNZ: 3× Platinum	Hopeless Fountain Kingdom
"Him & I" (with G-Eazy)	2017	14	10	18	9	16	72	6	17	9	22	RIAA: 5× Platinum; ARIA: 2× Platinum; BPI: Platinum; BRMA: Gold; FIMI: Platinum; GLF: Platinum; IFPI NOR: 2× Platinum; MC: 3× Platinum; RMNZ: 3× Platinum	The Beautiful & Damned
"Alone" (featuring Big Sean and Stefflon Don)	2018	66	—	—	—	—	—	—	— (Note: "Alone" did not enter the NZ Top 40 Singles Chart, but peaked at number eight on the NZ Heatseeker Singles Chart.)	—	—	RIAA: 2× Platinum; MC: Platinum; RMNZ: Platinum	Hopeless Fountain Kingdom
"Eastside" (with Benny Blanco and Khalid)	2018	9	2	28	6	1	59	3	1	7	1	RIAA: 7× Platinum; ARIA: 17× Platinum; BPI: 5× Platinum; BRMA: Gold; FIMI: Platinum; GLF: Platinum; IFPI NOR: 3× Platinum; MC: 5× Platinum; RMNZ: 9× Platinum	Friends Keep Secrets
"Without Me"	2018	1	2	17	2	3	33	5	3	9	3	RIAA: 14× Platinum; ARIA: 8× Platinum; BPI: 3× Platinum; BRMA: Platinum; FIMI: Platinum; GLF: 3× Platinum; IFPI NOR: 2× Platinum; MC: 9× Platinum; RMNZ: 7× Platinum	Manic
"11 Minutes" (with Yungblud featuring Travis Barker)	2019	— (Note: "11 Minutes" did not enter the Billboard Hot 100, but peaked at number 5 on the Bubbling Under Hot 100 chart.)	23	— (Note: "11 Minutes" did not enter the Flemish Ultratop 50, but peaked at number two on the Ultratip chart.)	69	—	—	—	— (Note: "11 Minutes" did not enter the NZ Top 40 Singles Chart, but peaked at number six on the NZ Hot Singles Chart.)	— (Note: "11 Minutes" did not enter the Swedish Singellista Chart, but peaked at number 12 on the Swedish Heatseeker Chart.)	59	RIAA: Platinum; ARIA: Platinum; BPI: Silver; MC: Platinum; RMNZ: Platinum	Non-album singles
"Nightmare" (Note: "Nightmare" was later included on the digital extended edition of If I Can't Have Love, I Want Power.)	2019	15	13	— (Note: "Nightmare" did not enter the Flemish Ultratop 50, but peaked at number six on the Ultratip chart.)	17	24	68	—	19	— (Note: "Nightmare" did not enter the Swedish Singellista Chart, but peaked at number 16 on the Swedish Heatseeker Chart.)	26	RIAA: 2× Platinum; ARIA: Platinum; BPI: Silver; MC: Platinum; RMNZ: Platinum	Non-album singles
"Graveyard"	2019	34	24	— (Note: "Graveyard" did not enter the Flemish Ultratop 50, but peaked at number seven on the Ultratip chart.)	38	30	—	—	27	95	29	RIAA: 3× Platinum; ARIA: 2× Platinum; BPI: Silver; GLF: Gold; IFPI NOR: Gold; MC: 2× Platinum; RMNZ: Platinum	Manic
"You Should Be Sad"	2020	26	4	24	21	5	83	36	23	44	12	RIAA: 4× Platinum; ARIA: Platinum; BPI: Platinum; FIMI: Gold; GLF: Gold; IFPI NOR: Gold; MC: 3× Platinum; RMNZ: 2× Platinum	Manic
"Experiment on Me"	2020	—	—	—	—	—	—	—	—	—	—		Birds of Prey: The Album
"The Other Girl" (with Kelsea Ballerini)	2020	95	—	—	—	—	—	—	— (Note: "The Other Girl" did not enter the NZ Top 40 Singles Chart, but peaked at number 18 on the NZ Hot Singles Chart.)	—	—	RIAA: Gold; MC: Gold	Kelsea
"Be Kind" (with Marshmello)	2020	29	15	— (Note: "Be Kind" did not enter the Flemish Ultratop 50, but peaked at number one on the Ultratip chart.)	18	22	66	29	32	48	33	RIAA: 2× Platinum; ARIA: Platinum; BPI: Gold; FIMI: Platinum; IFPI NOR: Gold; MC: 3× Platinum; RMNZ: 2× Platinum	Manic and Collabs
"Life's a Mess" (with Juice Wrld)	2020	9	8	— (Note: "Life's a Mess" did not enter the Flemish Ultratop 50, but peaked at number 21 on the Ultratip chart.)	10	53	—	22	14	26	11	RIAA: Platinum; BPI: Silver; RMNZ: Platinum	Legends Never Die and Collabs
"I Am Not a Woman, I'm a God"	2021	64	81	—	66	66	—	—	— (Note: "I Am Not a Woman, I'm a God" did not enter the NZ Top 40 Singles Chart, but peaked at number eight on the NZ Hot Singles Chart.)	—	72	RIAA: Gold	If I Can't Have Love, I Want Power
"You Asked for This"	2021	—	—	—	—	—	—	—	—	—	—		If I Can't Have Love, I Want Power
"So Good"	2022	51	79	—	46	—	—	—	— (Note: "So Good" did not enter the NZ Top 40 Singles Chart, but peaked at number eight on the NZ Hot Singles Chart.)	— (Note: "So Good" did not enter the Swedish Singellista Chart, but peaked at number four on the Swedish Heatseeker Chart.)	67	RIAA: Platinum; MC: Gold	Non-album single
"Stay with Me" (with Calvin Harris, Justin Timberlake, and Pharrell Williams)	2022	— (Note: "Stay with Me" did not enter the Billboard Hot 100, but peaked at number 2 on the Bubbling Under Hot 100 Singles chart.)	78	28	51	15	—	—	— (Note: "Stay with Me" did not enter the NZ Top 40 Singles Chart, but peaked at number two on the NZ Hot Singles Chart.)	43	10	ARIA: Gold; BPI: Silver	Funk Wav Bounces Vol. 2
"Die 4 Me"	2023	100	— (Note: "Die 4 Me" did not enter the ARIA Singles Chart, but peaked at number 43 on the ARIA Digital Track Chart.)	—	—	68	—	—	— (Note: "Die 4 Me" did not enter the NZ Top 40 Singles Chart, but peaked at number 11 on the NZ Hot Singles Chart.)	—	85		Non-album single
"Lilith (Diablo IV Anthem)" (featuring Suga of BTS) (Note: Released for promotion of the console game Diablo IV, "Lilith" is a reimagined version of Halsey's song of the same name from If I Can't Have Love, I Want Power. This version features new lyrics by Halsey and features Suga of BTS.)	2023	—	—	—	—	—	—	—	— (Note: "Lilith" did not enter the NZ Top 40 Singles Chart, but peaked at number 27 on the NZ Hot Singles Chart.)	—	—		If I Can't Have Love, I Want Power
"Lucky"	2024	88	—	—	—	—	—	—	— (Note: "Lucky" did not enter the NZ Top 40 Singles Chart, but peaked at number 12 on the NZ Hot Singles Chart.)	—	—		The Great Impersonator
"Lonely Is the Muse"	2024	—	—	—	—	—	—	—	— (Note: "Lonely Is the Muse" did not enter the NZ Top 40 Singles Chart, but peaked at number 22 on the NZ Hot Singles Chart.)	—	—		The Great Impersonator
"Ego"	2024	— (Note: "Ego" did not enter the Billboard Hot 100, but peaked at number 18 on the Bubbling Under Hot 100 Singles chart.)	—	—	—	—	—	—	— (Note: "Ego" did not enter the NZ Top 40 Singles Chart, but peaked at number 16 on the NZ Hot Singles Chart.)	—	—		The Great Impersonator
"I Never Loved You"	2024	—	—	—	—	—	—	—	—	—	—		The Great Impersonator
"Safeword"	2025	—	—	—	—	—	—	—	—	—	—		Non-album single
"Hand That Feeds" (with Amy Lee)	2025	— (Note: "Hand That Feeds" did not enter the Billboard Hot 100, but peaked at number 21 on the Digital Song Sales chart.)	—	—	—	—	—	—	— (Note: "Hand That Feeds" did not enter the NZ Top 40 Singles Chart, but peaked at number 34 on the NZ Hot Singles Chart.)	—	— (Note: "Hand That Feeds" did not enter the UK Singles Chart, but peaked at number 45 on the UK Singles Sales Chart.)		Ballerina
"Carry the Weight"	2026	—	—	—	—	—	—	—	—	—	—		The Great Impersonator (Deluxe)
"—" denotes a recording that did not chart or was not released in that territory.

=== As featured artist ===
List of singles as featured artist, showing year released, with selected chart positions, certifications and originating album
Title	Year	Peak chart positions										Certifications	Album
Title	Year	US	AUS	CAN	GER	IRE	ITA	NL	NZ	SWE	UK	Certifications	Album
"Hands" (as part of Various Artists for Orlando)	2016	—	—	—	—	—	—	—	—	—	—		Non-album single
"Closer" (The Chainsmokers featuring Halsey)	2016	1	1	1	2	1	2	3	1	1	1	RIAA: 18× Platinum; ARIA: 20× Platinum; BPI: 5× Platinum; BVMI: 2× Platinum; FIMI: 6× Platinum; GLF: 5× Platinum; MC: 2× Diamond; NVPI: Platinum; RMNZ: 10× Platinum	Collage
"Boy with Luv" (BTS featuring Halsey)	2019	8	10	7	47	14	60	58	12	29	13	RIAA: Platinum; ARIA: Platinum; BPI: Gold; FIMI: Gold; MC: 4× Platinum; RMNZ: Platinum	Map of the Soul: Persona
"—" denotes a recording that did not chart or was not released in that territory.

=== Promotional singles ===
List of promotional singles, showing year released, with selected chart positions, certifications and originating album
Title	Year	Peak chart positions							Certifications	Album
Title	Year	US	AUS	CAN	FRA	HUN	NZ	SCO	Certifications	Album
"Hurricane"	2014	—	—	—	—	—	—	—	RIAA: Platinum; RMNZ: Gold	Room 93 and Badlands
"Hold Me Down"	2015	—	78	—	—	—	—	—	RIAA: Platinum; ARIA: Gold	Badlands
"Drive"	2015	—	—	—	—	—	—	—	RIAA: Gold	Badlands
"Tokyo Narita (Freestyle)" (with Lido)	2016	—	—	—	—	—	—	—		Non-album promotional single
"Eyes Closed"	2017	— (Note: "Eyes Closed" did not enter the Billboard Hot 100, but did peak at number 1 on the Bubbling Under Hot 100 Singles extension chart.)	62	73	171	—	— (Note: "Eyes Closed" did not enter the NZ Top 40 Singles Chart, but peaked at number five on the NZ Heatseeker Singles Chart.)	48	RIAA: Platinum	Hopeless Fountain Kingdom
"Strangers" (featuring Lauren Jauregui)	2017	100	93	—	137	—	— (Note: "Strangers" did not enter the NZ Top 40 Singles Chart, but peaked at number three on the NZ Heatseeker Singles Chart.)	—	RIAA: Gold	Hopeless Fountain Kingdom
"Clementine"	2019	—	—	—	—	—	—	—		Manic
"Finally // Beautiful Stranger"	2019	— (Note: "Finally // Beautiful Stranger" did not enter the Billboard Hot 100, but did peak at number 17 on the Bubbling Under Hot 100 extension chart.)	—	—	—	—	— (Note: "Finally // Beautiful Stranger" did not enter the NZ Top 40 Singles Chart, but peaked at number 11 on the NZ Hot Singles Chart.)	45	RIAA: Gold; RMNZ: Gold	Manic
"Suga's Interlude" (with Suga of BTS)	2019	—	— (Note: "Suga's Interlude" did not enter the ARIA Singles Chart, but peaked at number 27 on the ARIA Digital Track Chart.)	—	—	9	— (Note: "Suga's Interlude" did not enter the NZ Top 40 Singles Chart, but peaked at number 18 on the NZ Hot Singles Chart.)	61		Manic and Collabs
"The End"	2024	—	—	—	—	—	—	—		The Great Impersonator
"—" denotes a recording that did not chart or was not released in that territory.

== Other charted and certified songs ==
List of other charted songs, showing year released, with selected chart positions, certifications and originating album name
Title	Year	Peak chart positions										Certifications	Album
Title	Year	US	US Rock	AUS	CAN	IRE	ITA	NL	NZ	SWE	UK	Certifications	Album
"Is There Somewhere"	2014	—	—	—	—	—	—	—	—	—	—	RIAA: Gold	Room 93
"Trouble (Stripped)"	2014	—	—	—	—	—	—	—	—	—	—	RIAA: Gold	Room 93
"The Feeling" (Justin Bieber featuring Halsey)	2015	31	—	22	25	31	69	25	20	34	34	RIAA: Platinum; ARIA: Platinum; BPI: Silver; GLF: Gold; MC: Platinum; RMNZ: Gold	Purpose
"Gasoline"	2016	—	—	—	—	—	—	—	—	—	—	RIAA: 3× Platinum; ARIA: Gold; BPI: Gold; GLF: Gold; RMNZ: Platinum	Badlands
"Control"	2016	—	—	—	—	—	—	—	—	—	—	RIAA: Platinum; BPI: Silver; RMNZ: Gold	Badlands
"Haunting"	2016	—	—	—	—	—	—	—	—	—	—	RIAA: Gold	Badlands
"Roman Holiday"	2016	—	—	—	—	—	—	—	—	—	—	RIAA: Gold	Badlands
"Young God"	2016	—	—	—	—	—	—	—	—	—	—	RIAA: Gold	Badlands
"Coming Down"	2016	—	—	—	—	—	—	—	—	—	—	RIAA: Gold	Badlands
"Sorry"	2017	—	—	—	—	—	—	—	—	—	—	RIAA: Platinum; BPI: Silver; RMNZ: Gold	Hopeless Fountain Kingdom
"Walls Could Talk"	2017	—	—	—	—	—	—	—	—	—	—	RIAA: Platinum; BPI: Silver; RMNZ: Gold	Hopeless Fountain Kingdom
"Damage" (with PartyNextDoor)	2017	—	—	—	81	—	—	—	—	—	—	MC: Gold	Seven Days
"Love Is Madness" (Thirty Seconds to Mars featuring Halsey)	2018	—	9	—	—	—	—	—	—	—	—		America
"Die for Me" (Post Malone featuring Future and Halsey)	2019	20	—	23	21	—	63	38	—	39	—	RIAA: 4× Platinum; ARIA: Platinum; BPI: Silver; MC: 2× Platinum; RMNZ: Gold	Hollywood's Bleeding
"Ashley"	2020	—	—	—	—	—	—	—	— (Note: "Ashley" did not enter the NZ Top 40 Singles Chart, but peaked at number 24 on the NZ Hot Singles Chart.)	—	—		Manic
"3AM"	2020	—	—	—	—	—	—	—	— (Note: "3AM" did not enter the NZ Top 40 Singles Chart, but peaked at number 23 on the NZ Hot Singles Chart.)	—	—		Manic
"Still Learning"	2020	— (Note: "Still Learning" did not enter the Billboard Hot 100, but did peak at number 11 on the Bubbling Under Hot 100 extension chart.)	—	—	—	81	—	—	— (Note: "Still Learning" did not enter the NZ Top 40 Singles Chart, but peaked at number 15 on the NZ Hot Singles Chart.)	—	—	RIAA: Gold	Manic
"I'm Not Mad" (Note: "I'm Not Mad" only appeared on the digital extended edition of Manic.)	2020	—	—	—	—	—	—	—	—	—	—	RIAA: Platinum	Manic
"Forget Me Too" (Machine Gun Kelly featuring Halsey)	2020	44	5	51	—	—	—	—	— (Note: "Forget Me Too" did not enter the NZ Top 40 Singles Chart, but peaked at number four on the NZ Hot Singles Chart.)	—	40	RIAA: Platinum; ARIA: Gold; BPI: Gold; MC: 2× Platinum; RMNZ: Gold	Tickets to My Downfall
"The Tradition"	2021	—	20	—	—	—	—	—	— (Note: "The Tradition" did not enter the NZ Top 40 Singles Chart, but peaked at number 14 on the NZ Hot Singles Chart.)	—	—		If I Can't Have Love, I Want Power
"Bells in Santa Fe"	2021	—	23	—	—	—	—	—	— (Note: "Bells in Santa Fe" did not enter the NZ Top 40 Singles Chart, but peaked at number 16 on the NZ Hot Singles Chart.)	—	—		If I Can't Have Love, I Want Power
"Easier than Lying"	2021	—	27	—	—	—	—	—	— (Note: "Easier than Lying" did not enter the NZ Top 40 Singles Chart, but peaked at number 19 on the NZ Hot Singles Chart.)	—	—		If I Can't Have Love, I Want Power
"Lilith"	2021	—	18	—	—	—	—	—	—	—	—		If I Can't Have Love, I Want Power
"Girl Is a Gun"	2021	—	35	—	—	—	—	—	—	—	—		If I Can't Have Love, I Want Power
"Darling"	2021	—	29	—	—	—	—	—	—	—	—		If I Can't Have Love, I Want Power
"1121"	2021	—	32	—	—	—	—	—	—	—	—		If I Can't Have Love, I Want Power
"Honey"	2021	—	31	—	—	—	—	—	—	—	—		If I Can't Have Love, I Want Power
"Whispers"	2021	—	39	—	—	—	—	—	—	—	—		If I Can't Have Love, I Want Power
"The Lighthouse"	2021	—	43	—	—	—	—	—	—	—	—		If I Can't Have Love, I Want Power
"Ya'aburnee"	2021	—	45	—	—	—	—	—	—	—	—		If I Can't Have Love, I Want Power
"Could Have Been Me"	2022	—	22	—	—	83	—	—	—	—	94	RIAA: Platinum; BPI: Silver; RMNZ: Gold	Sing 2: Original Motion Picture Soundtrack
"People Disappear Here"	2022	—	49	—	—	—	—	—	—	—	—		If I Can't Have Love, I Want Power
"Panic Attack"	2024	—	25	—	—	—	—	—	— (Note: "Panic Attack" did not enter the NZ Top 40 Singles Chart, but peaked at number 26 on the NZ Hot Singles Chart.)	—	—		The Great Impersonator
"—" denotes a recording that did not chart or was not released in that territory.

== Other appearances ==
List of guest appearances, showing year released, other performing artists, and originating album
Title	Year	Other artist(s)	Album
"Free Love"	2016	Vic Mensa, Le1f, Lil B, Malik Yusef	Non-album songs
"Earth"	2019	Lil Dicky	Non-album songs
"¿"	2019	Bring Me the Horizon	Music to Listen To...
"Stay with Me (Part 2)"	2022	Calvin Harris, Justin Timberlake, Pharrell Williams	Funk Wav Bounces Vol. 2
"Take a Bow"	2024	Jelly Roll	Beautifully Broken (Pickin' Up the Pieces)

== Music videos ==
List of music videos, showing year released and directors
Title	Year	Director(s)	Ref.
As lead artist
"Hurricane"	2014	Alex De Bonrepos	
"Trouble" (Teaser)	2014	Alex De Bonrepos	
"Ghost" (Room 93 version)	2014	Alex De Bonrepos	
"Empty Gold" (Teaser)	2014	Alex De Bonrepos	
"Ghost"	2015	Malia James	
"New Americana"	2015	Jodeb	
"Colors"	2016	Tim Mattia	
"Castle"	2016	Scott Murray	
"Now or Never"	2017	Sing J Lee; Halsey	
"Bad at Love"	2017	Sing J Lee; Halsey	
"Bad at Love" (Angelus Cut version)	2017	Sing J Lee; Halsey	
"Him & I" (with G-Eazy)	2017	Bobby Bruderle	
"Sorry"	2018	Sing J Lee; Halsey	
"Alone" (featuring Big Sean and Stefflon Don)	2018	Hannah Lux Davis; Halsey	
"Strangers" (featuring Lauren Jauregui)	2018	Jessie Hill; Halsey	
"Eastside" (with Benny Blanco and Khalid)	2018	Jake Schreier	
"Without Me" (Vertical video)	2018	—N/a	
"Without Me"	2018	Colin Tilley	
"11 Minutes" (with Yungblud featuring Travis Barker)	2019	Colin Tilley	
"Nightmare"	2019	Hannah Lux Davis	
"Graveyard" (Time-lapse)	2019	Juliana Carpino	
"Clementine"	2019	Dani Vitale; Anton Tammi	
"Graveyard"	2019	Anton Tammi	
"Finally // Beautiful Stranger"	2019	Patrick Tracy	
"You Should Be Sad"	2020	Colin Tilley	
"Be Kind" (with Marshmello)	2020	Hannah Lux Davis	
"Life's a Mess" (Visualizer) (with Juice Wrld)	2020	Chad Ross	
"929"	2020	Peter Donaghy	
"Dominic's Interlude" (with Dominic Fike)	2020	Emma Westenberg	
"I Am Not a Woman, I'm a God"*	2021	Colin Tilley	
"Girl Is a Gun"*	2022	Colin Tilley	
"So Good"	2022	Alev Aydin	
"Lilith (Diablo IV Anthem) (featuring Suga of BTS)	2023	Henry Hobson	
"Lucky"	2024	Gia Coppolla	
"Gasoline"	2025	Halsey	
"Drive"	2025	Halsey	
As featured artist
"The Feeling" (Justin Bieber featuring Halsey)	2015	Parris Goebel	
"Closer" (The Chainsmokers featuring Halsey)	2016	Dano Cerny	
"Boy with Luv" (BTS featuring Halsey)	2019	YongSeok Choi	
"Boy with Luv" ("ARMY with Luv" version) (BTS featuring Halsey)	2019	YongSeok Choi	
"Forget Me Too" (Machine Gun Kelly featuring Halsey and Travis Barker)	2020	Philip Andelman	
"Stay with Me" (Calvin Harris featuring Justin Timberlake, Halsey and Pharrell Williams)	2022	Emil Nava	
As guest performer
"Earth" (Lil Dicky)	2019	Nigel Tierney; Federico Heller; Tony Yacenda	

•"*" denotes that the music video was originally featured in the If I Can't Have Love, I Want Power film.
