= Back to Badlands Tour =

2025–2026 concert tour by Halsey

- Tour by Halsey
- Location: Asia; Europe; North America; Oceania
- Associated album: Badlands
- Start date: October 14, 2025
- End date: February 20, 2026
- Legs: 3
- No. of shows: 36

Halsey concert chronology
- For My Last Trick: The Tour (2025); Back to Badlands Tour (2025–2026)

The Back to Badlands Tour was the sixth headlining concert tour by American singer Halsey, celebrating the tenth anniversary of her (Note: Halsey uses both she/her and they/them pronouns and switches between them; this article uses she/her pronouns for consistency.) debut studio album, Badlands (2015). The tour began in Los Angeles on October 14, 2025, and concluded in Melbourne on February 20, 2026.

== Background ==
Halsey announced the tour on August 28, 2025, with 22 shows across North America, Europe and Australia spanning from October 2025 through February 2026. The tour serves as a ten year anniversary celebration for her debut album Badlands. Prior to the announcement of the tour, Halsey revealed that she will release new music videos for "Gasoline" and "Drive" in celebration of the album's anniversary. Halsey also released a special ten year anniversary edition of Badlands on August 29, 2025. Tickets are going on sale on September 5, 2025, with various presales running from September 2 to 5. On September 2, 2025, new dates for London, Paris and various cities in the United States and Canada were added due to "overwhelming demand". On September 4, 2025, Halsey added an extra show for New York City, Toronto, Sydney and Melbourne due to high demand.

== Set list ==
The following set list is from the October 14, 2025, concert in Los Angeles. It is not intended to represent all dates.

1. "Badlands TV" (interlude)
2. "Gasoline"
3. "Castle"
4. "Control"
5. "Bells in Santa Fe"
6. "Drive"
7. "Coming Down" (rock mix)
8. "You Should Be Sad"
9. "The Lighthouse" (disco country mix)
10. "Strange Love"
11. "Haunting"
12. "New Americana"
13. "Hurricane"
14. "Dog Years"
15. "Nightmare" (contains elements of "Nightmare (Reprise)")
16. "Hold Me Down"
17. "Garden" (demo version)
18. "Ghost"
19. "Roman Holiday"
20. "Closer"
21. "Ego"
22. "Colors pt. II" (interlude)
23. "Colors"
24. "Ashley"
25. "People Disappear Here"
26. "Without Me"
27. "Badlands on 3D" (interlude)
28. "Lonely Is the Muse"
29. "Young God" (orchestral version)
30. "Bad at Love" (remix)
31. "Trouble" (acoustic)
32. "Tokyo Narita (Freestyle)"
33. "Is There Somewhere"

== Tour dates ==
List of 2025 concerts, showing date, city, country, venue
Date (2025)	City	Country	Venue
October 14	Los Angeles	United States	Hollywood Forever
October 15	Los Angeles	United States	Hollywood Forever
October 16	Los Angeles	United States	Hollywood Forever
October 22	Mexico City	Mexico	Pabellón Oeste
October 24	Dallas	United States	South Side Ballroom
October 26	Atlanta	United States	Coca-Cola Roxy
October 29	Philadelphia	United States	The Fillmore Philadelphia
October 30	Philadelphia	United States	The Fillmore Philadelphia
November 2	Boston	United States	MGM Music Hall at Fenway
November 3	Boston	United States	MGM Music Hall at Fenway
November 4	Washington, D.C.	United States	The Anthem
November 6	Minneapolis	United States	Minneapolis Armory
November 8	Chicago	United States	Byline Bank Aragon Ballroom
November 9	Chicago	United States	Byline Bank Aragon Ballroom
November 12	Denver	United States	Fillmore Auditorium
November 13	Denver	United States	Fillmore Auditorium
December 12 (Note: The December 12, 2025, concert, was a part of MDLBEAST Soundstorm.)	Riyadh	Saudi Arabia	BanBan

List of 2026 concerts, showing date, city, country, venue
Date (2026)	City	Country	Venue
January 9	Toronto	Canada	History
January 10	Toronto	Canada	History
January 11	Toronto	Canada	History
January 13	New York City	United States	Hammerstein Ballroom
January 14	New York City	United States	Hammerstein Ballroom
January 15	New York City	United States	Hammerstein Ballroom
January 17	Detroit	United States	The Fillmore Detroit
January 18	Detroit	United States	The Fillmore Detroit
January 22	Amsterdam	Netherlands	AFAS Live
January 23	Berlin	Germany	Velodrom
January 24	Düsseldorf	Germany	Mitsubishi Electric Halle
January 26	Paris	France	L'Olympia
January 27	Paris	France	L'Olympia
January 29	Manchester	England	Aviva Studios
February 1	London	England	O_{2} Academy Brixton
February 3	London	England	O_{2} Academy Brixton
February 4	London	England	O_{2} Academy Brixton
February 13	Sydney	Australia	Hordern Pavilion
February 14	Sydney	Australia	Hordern Pavilion
February 17	Brisbane	Australia	Riverstage
February 19	Melbourne	Australia	Festival Hall
February 20	Melbourne	Australia	Festival Hall
