= Lido discography =

This is the discography for Norwegian electronic musician Lido.

== Albums ==
Album	Peak position	Details	Track listing
Album	NOR	Details	Track listing
Pretty Girls & Grey Sweaters	6	Released: February 1, 2012; Label: Universal Music Group; Formats: Digital download	1. "Melody (Intro)"; 2. "Comfortable"; 3. "Turn Up the Life"; 4. "Different"; 5. "Hey Girl"; 6. "Numbers"; 7. "Hold My Hand"; 8. "Chop It Up"; 9. "All This Time"; 10. "Nightplane"; 11. "I'm Not a Rapper"; 12. "Fake ID" (Little Steven Edit); 13. "Different, Pt. 2"
Battle Poetry	5	Released: June 17, 2013; Label: Universal Music Group; Formats: Digital download	1. "Work (Intro)"; 2. "Us (The Anthem)"; 3. "Make the World Go Round"; 4. "Heartbreak in the Club"; 5. "Drums, Pt. I"; 6. "Drums, Pt. II"; 7. "Sleeping on My Piano"; 8. "She Cried Ice (Interlude)"; 9. "Colder" (feat. Maria Mena & Bun B); 10. "Meeko"; 11. "Caroline"; 12. "Everything (Interlude)"; 13. "Simple"; 14. "Looks Like You"; 15. "Ode to the Old You"; 16. "No Lights Left"
Everything	8	Released: October 7, 2016; Label: Universal Music Group; Formats: Digital download	1. "Catharsis"; 2. "Murder"; 3. "Dye"; 4. "So Cold"; 5. "Crazy"; 6. "Falling Down"; 7. "Citi Bike"; 8. "Only One"; 9. "You Lost Your Keys"; 10. "Angel"; 11. "Tell Me How To Feel"
Everything Remixed		Released: 2017; Label: Universal Music Group; Formats:	1. "Angel (Jaykode Remix)"; 2. "Angel (Dan Farber Remix)"; 3. "Crazy (Brasstracks Remix)"; 4. "Crazy (Alison Wonderland Remix)"; 5. "Crazy (Soft Glas Remix)"; 6. "Citi Bike (Umru Remix)"; 7. "Citi Bike (Melf Remix)"; 8. "So Cold (Minnesota Remix)"; 9. "Dye (mossy. Remix)"
PEDER		Released: 2020; Label: Because Music; Formats: Digital download	1. "Yellow Bike (Intro)"; 2. "Rise"; 3. "Please Fasten Your Seatbelt"; 4. "Grouptext" (feat. Ebenezer); 5. "Layaway"; 6. "5 songs (Interlude)"; 7. "Part Time" (feat. Heavy Mellow); 8. "University" (feat. JoJo, Col3trane, & Santell); 9. "How to Do Nothing"; 10. "BEST4U" (feat. Mulherin); 11. "Postclubridehomemusic"; 12. "Pure / Santiago"
ULTRAVIOLET		Released: 2023; Label: Lil Narnia; Formats: Digital download	1. SAUDADE; 2. WOMAN (feat. Easton Fitz); 3. HONDA (feat. Jordan Ward); 4. RUFF (feat. No Rome); 5. BUMPIN (feat. Dizzy Fae); 6. AKSEL'S INTERLUDE; 7. STILL DECIDING (feat. Choker); 8. UR TURN (feat. Jordan Ward); 9. SIGNAL; 10. TIME TO GO (feat. Jordan Ward); 11. JET OUT (feat. Easton Fitz)

== Extended plays ==
Title	Details	Track listing
I Love You	Released: 23 June 2014; Label: Pelican Fly; Formats: Digital download	1. "I Love You"; 2. "I Love You Pt. II"; 3. "Money"; 4. "Lost" (feat. Muri)
I Love You Too (Remixes)	Released: 27 October 27, 2014; Label: Pelican Fly; Formats: Digital download	1. "I Love You" (Hoodboi Remix); 2. "I Love You Pt. II" (Obey City Remix); 3. "Money" (Lindsay Lowend Remix); 4. "Lost" (feat. Muri) (Heavy Mellow Remix); 5. "Money" (Para One Remix)
Superspeed (with Canblaster)	Released: 6 April 2015; Label: Pelican Fly; Formats: Digital download	1. "06:59 am" 2. "Alarm Clock"; 3. "Rush Hour"; 4. "Superspeed"; 5. "Hyperspeed"; 6. "Too Late !"
The Passion Project (with Santell)	Released: 23 October 2015; Label: Mad Decent (US) & Pelican Fly (ROW); Formats: Digital download	1. "Ashley"; 2. "Pillows"; 3. "WTFIMP (Interlude)"; 4. "Lady's a Hoe"; 5. "Saved by You (Outro)"
Spacesuit (with J'von)	Released: 4 May 2018; Label: Because Music; Formats: Digital download	1. Sneakerhead (feat. Towkio); 2. Westin; 3. Wood Floors (feat. Mulherin); 4. People (feat. Mayer Hawthorne); 5. Highly Overdue; 6. Stay With Me; 7. Time and Space (Outro)
I O U 1	Released: 28 September 2018; Label: Because Music; Formats: Digital download	1. Liar; 2. 3 Million; 3. Outstanding; 4. Partake; 5. Corner Love (with Unge Ferrari)
I O U 2	Released: 16 November 2018; Label: Because Music; Formats: Digital download	1. Ex; 2. Flaws; 3. Vultures; 4. The Lonely Slowly Loves; 5. Son Of Simon (Outro)

== Mixtapes ==
Title	Details	Track listing
The Good Guy Mixtape	Released: 2008; Label: Unofficial; Formats: Digital download	"Ain't Gonna Dance With You" (feat. Ingrid); "Rawest" (feat. Magnus Larsen); "I Am" (feat. Area); "No Ones Gonna Take Me Alive"; "On the Low" (feat. Ivy League); "I Am a Good Guy (Intro)"; "Make Him Jealous"; "Miracle" (feat. Chris Lee); "Game" (feat. Final)
I Love You Too (The Remixtape)	Released: December 3, 2014; Label: Free Download; Formats: Digital download	"I Love You Pt. 2.5"; "I Love You" (Alizzz Remix); "I Love You Pt. II" (Inodi Remix); "Money" (Mister Tweeks Remix); "Lost" (feat. Muri) (813 Remix); "Money" (Lido & Crookers Remix feat. STS); "I Love You" (Tr!ck$ Remix); "Money" (Douchka Remix); "I Love You Pt. II" (Lazerdisk Remix); "Money" (R3ll Remix); "Lost" (feat. Muri) (Stwo Remix)
2014 Remixes	Released: January 15, 2015; Label: Free Download; Formats: Digital download	Justin Timberlake – "TKO" (Lido Remix); S-Type – "Billboard" (Lido Remix); Yung Lean – "Gatorade" (Lido Remix); Disclosure feat. Sam Smith – "Latch" (Lido Remix); Bill Withers – "Ain't No Sunshine" (Lido Remix); AlunaGeorge – "Superstar" (Cosmo's Midnight & Lido Remix); Bastille – "Bad Blood" (Lido Remix); Banks – "Drowning" (Lido Remix); Zhu – "Faded" (Lido Remix); MØ – "Walk This Way" (Lido Remix); The Weeknd – "Often" (Lido Remix); Alt-J – "Left Hand Free" (Lido Remix); Flight Facilities feat. Emma Louise – "Two Bodies" (Lido Remix); Alli Simpson – "Why I'm Single" (Lido Remix); Para One – "You Too" (Lido Remix); Zhu – "Faded" (Lido & J Heat Edit); Lido & Halsey – "Slow"
The Life of Peder	Released: March 29, 2016; Label: Free Download; Formats: Digital download	Kanye West - "Father Stretch My Hands Pt 1" (Remix); Kanye West - "I Love Kanye" (Remix); Kanye West - "Facts" (Remix); Kanye West - "Famous" (Remix); Kanye West - "FML" (Remix)
kidsloveghosts	Released: June 18, 2018; Label: Free download; Formats: Digital download	Kids See Ghosts - "Feel The Love" (Remix); Kanye West - "Yikes" (Remix); Kids See Ghosts - "Fire" (Remix); Kanye West - "Violent Crimes" (Remix); Kids See Ghosts "Freee (Ghost Town Pt 2)" (Remix)

== Singles ==
Title	Details	Album
"Money"	Released: May 21, 2014; Label: Pelican Fly; Format: Digital download	I Love You EP
"Crazy"	Released: April 8, 2014; Label: Because Music; Format: Digital download	Everything
"Murder"	Released: September 23, 2016; Label: Because Music; Format: Digital download	Everything
"Dye"	Released: September 30, 2016; Label: Because Music; Format: Digital download	Everything
"Angel" (Radio Edit)	Released: 17 March 2017; Label: Because Music; Format: Digital download	Non-album singles
"Not Enough" (feat. THEY.)	Released: June 9, 2017; Label: Because Music; Format: Digital download	Non-album singles
"3 Million"	Released: July 24, 2018; Label: Because Music; Format: Digital download	I O U 1 EP
"Corner Love" (with Unge Ferrari)	Released: August 21, 2018; Label: Because Music; Format: Digital download	I O U 1 EP
"Outstanding"	Released: September 21, 2018; Label: Because Music; Format: Digital download	I O U 1 EP
"Live In Pretend" (with Jim Alxndr)	Released: 25 November 2022; Label: Seeking Blue; Format: Digital download	Non-album singles

== Featured in ==
- 2010: "Once Upon a Time" (Bjørn Johan Muri feat. LidoLido) (Universal Music) (NO #17)

== Songwriting and production credits ==
Title	Year	Artist	Album	Songwriting	Producing
"Hele Veien Hjem"	2008	Chem	Til By'n Og Tilbake	check	check
"Turning Tables"	2011	Gatekunst	Gatekunst 4	check	check
"With Me"	2014	Cashmere Cat	Wedding Bells	check	
"Pearls"	2014	Cashmere Cat	Wedding Bells	check	
"Wedding Bells"	2014	Cashmere Cat	Wedding Bells	check	
"Rice Rain"	2014	Cashmere Cat	Wedding Bells	check	
"Tone Damli"	2014	Kaveh Ali Mohammad	Sannheten Sårer	check	check
"Paying"	2014	D'Sound	Signs	check	check
"Be My Baby" (featuring Cashmere Cat)	2014	Ariana Grande	My Everything	check	check
"Party Girls" (featuring Wiz Khalifa, Jeremih, and Cashmere Cat)	2014	Ludacris	Non-album single	check	check
"Cold"	2015	Alison Wonderland	Run	check	check
"Adore" (featuring Ariana Grande)	2015	Cashmere Cat	9	check	check
"Castle"	2015	Halsey	Badlands	check	check
"Hold Me Down"	2015	Halsey	Badlands	check	check
"New Americana"	2015	Halsey	Badlands		check
"Drive"	2015	Halsey	Badlands		check
"Colors"	2015	Halsey	Badlands		check
"Coming Down"	2015	Halsey	Badlands		check
"Haunting"	2015	Halsey	Badlands		check
"Control"	2015	Halsey	Badlands		check
"Young God"	2015	Halsey	Badlands		check
"Strange Love"	2015	Halsey	Badlands		check
"Gasoline"	2015	Halsey	Badlands	check	check
"Better"	2015	Banks	Non-album single	check	check
"Hyde"	2015	Astrid S	Non-album single	check	check
"Same Drugs"	2016	Chance the Rapper	Coloring Book	check	check
"Angels" (featuring Saba)	2016	Chance the Rapper	Coloring Book	check	check
"Yammy Gang" (featuring ASAP Mob and Tatianna Paulino)	2016	ASAP Ferg	Always Strive and Prosper	check	check
"Attitudeproblem"	2016	Karpe	Heisann Montebello	check	check
"The Prologue"	2017	Halsey	Hopeless Fountain Kingdom	check	check
"Good Mourning"	2017	Halsey	Hopeless Fountain Kingdom	check	check
"Lie" (featuring Quavo)	2017	Halsey	Hopeless Fountain Kingdom	check	check
"Walls Could Talk"	2017	Halsey	Hopeless Fountain Kingdom	check	check
"Don't Play"	2017	Halsey	Hopeless Fountain Kingdom	check	check
"Keep You Close"	2017	Knox Fortune	Paradise	check	check
"Stars"	2017	Knox Fortune	Paradise		
"B"	2017	Jaden	Syre	check	check
"L"	2017	Jaden	Syre	check	check
"U"	2017	Jaden	Syre	check	check
"E"	2017	Jaden	Syre	check	check
"Hope"	2017	Jaden	Syre	check	check
"Ninety"	2017	Jaden	Syre	check	check
"Love It"	2017	Liam Tracy	Drugs and Alcohol 2	check	check
"Swim"	2018	Towkio	WWW.	check	check
"Symphony" (featuring Teddy Jackson)	2018	Towkio	WWW.	check	check
"Hot Shit"	2018	Towkio	WWW.		check
"Morning View" (featuring SZA)	2018	Towkio	WWW.	check	check
"Forever" (featuring Vic Mensa)	2018	Towkio	WWW.	check	check
"2 Da Moon" (featuring Teddy Jackson and Grace Weber)	2018	Towkio	WWW.	check	check
"CNTRL"	2018	Towkio	WWW.	check	check
"Drift"	2018	Towkio	WWW.	check	check
"Lose Me (I Don't Mind)"	2018	Towkio	WWW.	check	check
"Alone"	2018	Towkio	WWW.	check	check
"Okay"	2018	Alison Wonderland	Awake		check
"Cry"	2018	Alison Wonderland	Awake		check
"Happy Place"	2018	Alison Wonderland	Awake		check
"Hope (Interlude)"	2018	Alison Wonderland	Awake		check
"Awake"	2018	Alison Wonderland	Awake		check
"Really Rong"	2018	¿Téo?	¿Téo?	check	check
"Thru My Hair"	2018	¿Téo?	¿Téo?	check	check
"Easy"	2018	Ella Mai	Ella Mai	check	check
"The Distance" (featuring Ty Dolla Sign)	2018	Mariah Carey	Caution	check	check
"Runway"	2018	Mariah Carey	Caution	check	check
"No Hands"	2018	Ric Wilson	Non-album single	check	
"Mira Mira" (featuring IAMDDB)	2019	Diplo	Europa	check	check
"Billi"	2019	Towkio	Non-album single	check	check
"P"	2019	Jaden	Erys	check	check
"I"	2019	Jaden	Erys	check	check
"N"	2019	Jaden	Erys	check	check
"LaLa Challenge"	2019	EarthGang	Mirrorland	check	check
"Get a Bag" (featuring Calboy)	2019	Chance the Rapper	The Big Day	check	check
"Trina"	2019	Smino	Non-album single	check	check
"Mientes"	2020	Jesse Baez	Nitro	check	check
"Forever ... (Is a Long Time)"	2020	Halsey	Manic	check	check
"Dominic's Interlude" (with Dominic Fike)	2020	Halsey	Manic	check	check
"I Hate Everybody"	2020	Halsey	Manic	check	check
"Alanis' Interlude" (with Alanis Morissette)	2020	Halsey	Manic	check	check
"Suga's Interlude" (with Suga of BTS)	2020	Halsey	Manic	check	check
"More"	2020	Halsey	Manic	check	check
"Industry Games"	2020	Chika	Industry Games	check	check
"Songs About You"	2020	Chika	Industry Games	check	check
"Balencies"	2020	Chika	Industry Games	check	check
"Designer"	2020	Chika	Industry Games	check	check
"On My Way"	2020	Chika	Industry Games	check	check
"Crown"	2020	Chika	Industry Games	check	check
"U Should"	2020	Chika	Non-album single	check	check
"My Power"	2020	Chika	Non-album single	check	check
"Hard Feelings"	2020	Miquela	Non-album single		check
"Pedialyte"	2020	JoJo	Good to Know	check	check
"Gold"	2020	JoJo	Good to Know		check
"Think About You"	2020	JoJo	Good to Know	check	check
"Don't Talk Me Down"	2020	JoJo	Good to Know	check	check
"Proud (Outro)"	2020	JoJo	Good to Know	check	check
"I've Been Starting to Love All the Things I Hate"	2020	Aluna	Renaissance	check	check
"Sneak"	2020	Aluna	Renaissance	check	check
"Don't Hit My Line"	2020	Aluna	Renaissance	check	check
"Get Paid" (with Princess Nokia and Jada Kingdom)	2020	Aluna	Renaissance		check
"Greygoose"	2020	Dounia	Non-album single	check	
"Corpus Christi"	2021	PrettyMuch	Smackables	check	check
"Fairy Tales" (featuring BJ the Chicago Kid)	2021	Chika	Once Upon a Time	check	check
"Hickory Dickory"	2021	Chika	Once Upon a Time		check
"Cinderella, Pt. 1"	2021	Chika	Once Upon a Time		check
"Cinderella, Pt. 2"	2021	Chika	Once Upon a Time		check
"FWB"	2021	Chika	Once Upon a Time		check
"2Am"	2021	Col3trane	3rd Fountain: Demos	check	check
"Lock It Up" (featuring THEY.)	2021	Emotional Oranges	The Juicebox	check	check
"I'll Wait"	2021	¿Teo?	Sol	check	check
"Suplicar"	2021	¿Teo?	Sol	check	check
"UNI2"	2021	¿Teo?	Sol	check	check
"Triple Check"	2021	Contradash	Non-album single	check	check
"Judas"	2021	Cheeno Ghee	Non-album single	check	check
"Rageless Hope"	2021	99 Neighbors	Wherever You're Going I Hope It's Great	check	check
"Live a Little"	2021	99 Neighbors	Wherever You're Going I Hope It's Great	check	check
"49er"	2021	99 Neighbors	Wherever You're Going I Hope It's Great	check	check
"Hazel"	2021	99 Neighbors	Wherever You're Going I Hope It's Great	check	
"Tontine	2021	99 Neighbors	Wherever You're Going I Hope It's Great	check	
"Ben & Jerry"	2021	Salem Ilese	Unsponsored Content	check	check
"Still in Love"	2021	Jaden	CTV3: Cool Tape Vol. 3	check	check
"Bye"	2021	Jaden	CTV3: Cool Tape Vol. 3	check	check
"Santa Barbara"	2021	Jaden	CTV3: Cool Tape Vol. 3	check	check
"Lil Baby Crush"	2021	Jordan Ward	Remain Calm	check	check
"Thrive"	2021	Jordan Ward	Remain Calm	check	check
"Yipiyay"	2021	Aminé	TwoPointFive	check	check
"Colors"	2021	Aminé	TwoPointFive	check	check
"OKWME"	2021	Aminé	TwoPointFive	check	check
"Twisted!"	2021	Aminé	TwoPointFive	check	check
"Charmander"	2021	Aminé	TwoPointFive	check	check
"Mad Funny Freestyle"	2021	Aminé	TwoPointFive	check	check
"Van Gogh"	2021	Aminé	TwoPointFive	check	check
"Between the Lines"	2021	Aminé	TwoPointFive	check	check
"Shit2Luz"	2021	Aminé	TwoPointFive	check	check
"On & On" (with Bas)	2022	Alex Isley and Jack Dine	Marigold	check	check
"Misunderstood"	2022	Banks	Serpentina	check	check
"Unleavable"	2022	Banks	Serpentina	check	check
"Hotline"	2022	bLAck pARty	Hummingbird	check	check
"I Love You More Than You Know" (featuring Childish Gambino)	2022	bLAck pARty	Hummingbird	check	check
"High Priestess"	2022	Santigold	Spirituals	check	
"Witness"	2022	Santigold	Spirituals	check	check
"Sound of Your Summer"	2022	Quarry	Non-album single		check
"Conversation"	2022	Gwen Bunn	Phase	check	check
"One of Us"	2022	Merlyn Wood	Non-album single		check
"Spooky Link"	2022	Dizzy Fae	Non-album single	check	check
"Be So Cruel"	2022	ASTN	Non-album single	check	check
"Bussdown"	2023	Jordan Ward	Forward		check
"IDC" (with Joony)	2023	Jordan Ward	Forward		check
"FamJam4000"	2023	Jordan Ward	Forward		check
"ForFourFore"	2023	Jordan Ward	Forward		check
"311" (with Gwen Bunn)	2023	Jordan Ward	Forward		check
"White Crocs" (with Ryan Trey)	2023	Jordan Ward	Forward		check
"Dance Machine"	2023	Jordan Ward	Forward		check
"Flights"	2023	Jordan Ward	Forward		check
"Think Twice"	2023	Jordan Ward	Forward		check
"0495"	2023	Jordan Ward	Forward	check	check
"Forward"	2023	Jordan Ward	Forward		check
"Sidekick" (with Joyce Wrice)	2023	Jordan Ward	Forward		check
"Cherimoya"	2023	Jordan Ward	Forward		check
"Zoomies"	2023	Jordan Ward	Moreward(Forward)		check
"Webbie" (with Easton Fitz)	2023	Jordan Ward	Moreward(Forward)		check
"Bad for Me" (with Corbin and Chief Keef)	2023	Skrillex	Don't Get Too Close	check	check
"Don't Get Too Close" (with Bibi Bourelly)	2023	Skrillex	Don't Get Too Close	check	check
"The End"	2023	Johnny Yukon	Movies! Worldwide: Part I	check	check
"Baby Boy"	2024	Kash Doll	The Last Doll		check
"2High"	2024	Audrey Nuna	Trench	check	check
"U"	2024	Tori Kelly	Tori	check	check
"JRNYRadio"	2024	Jordan Ward and Joony	JRNY	check	check
"Jealousy"	2024	Jordan Ward and Joony	JRNY	check	check
"One Too Many Times"	2024	Jordan Ward and Joony	JRNY	check	check
"Burning Rubber"	2024	Jordan Ward and Joony	JRNY	check	check
"Embargo"	2024	Jordan Ward and Joony	JRNY	check	check
"Apologize" (with Eryn Allen Kane)	2024	Big Sean	Better Me Than You	check	check
"Sideways"	2024	Ambré	I Do This Sh*t in My Sleep		check
"Perfect Timing"	2024	Ambré	I Do This Sh*t in My Sleep		check
"Dance with the Devil" (with Anderson .Paak)	2024	Blxst	I'll Always Come Find You	check	check
"Lights On"	2024	Normani	Dopamine	check	check
"I Can't Lend You My Heart"	2024	Dizzy Fae	Are We There Yet?		check
"You're Always on My Mind"	2024	Dizzy Fae	Are We There Yet?		check
"Talk About It"	2024	Dizzy Fae	Are We There Yet?		check
"Remind Me (Intro)"	2024	Dizzy Fae	Are We There Yet?		check
"Thinkin" (featuring Destin Conrad)	2024	Jean Deaux	Nowhere, Fast	check	check
"Peacekeeper"	2024	1010benja	Ten Total		check
"Locked In"	2025	Sailorr	From Florida's Finest	check	check
"Coconut" (with Eem Triplin)	2025	Sailorr	From Florida's Finest		check
"Done Shaving 4 U"	2025	Sailorr	From Florida's Finest		check
"No Good" (with Reggie)	2025	Monte Booker	Noise (Meaning)	check	
"Tell Me Why"	2025	Chase Shakur	Wonderlove	check	check
"COPDD"	2025	Yuqi	Non-album single		check
"Babylona"	2025	Danny Ocean	Babylon Club	check	check
"Oakland Baby"	2025	Karri and Isaiah Falls	Non-album single	check	check
"Earthquakes"	2025	Healy	Force of Nature	check	check
"Sage Time"	2025	Aminé	13 Months of Sunshine	check	check
"Raspberry Kisses"	2025	Aminé	13 Months of Sunshine	check	check
"Arc de Triomphe"	2025	Aminé	13 Months of Sunshine		check
"Disgusted"	2025	Lola Brooke	Non-album single	check	
"Beg Quietly"	2025	Serpentwithfeet	Grip Sequel	check	check
"Chump Change"	2025	Nate Curry	Left Field	check	check
"Hellbent"	2026	Naomi Scott	F.I.G	check	check
"Sweet Nausea"	2026	Naomi Scott	F.I.G	check	check
"Rhythm" (with Johnny Yukon)	2026	Naomi Scott	F.I.G	check	check
"Cut Me Loose"	2026	Naomi Scott	F.I.G	check	check
"Cherry"	2026	Naomi Scott	F.I.G	check	check
"Call for Me"	2026	Naomi Scott	F.I.G	check	check
"Best Kind"	2026	Naomi Scott	F.I.G	check	check
"Bound"	2026	Naomi Scott	F.I.G	check	check
"Losing You"	2026	Naomi Scott	F.I.G	check	check
"Bliss"	2026	Naomi Scott	F.I.G	check	check
"Gracie"	2026	Naomi Scott	F.I.G	check	check
"All of My Friends"	2026	Jack Harlow	Monica	check	
"Stranger"	2026	Jordan Ward	Backward	check	check
"Smokin Potna" (with Sailorr)	2026	Jordan Ward	Backward	check	check
"High Functioning"	2026	Jordan Ward	Backward	check	check
"BWD"	2026	Jordan Ward	Backward	check	check
"Ross Fit"	2026	Jordan Ward	Backward	check	check
"Noisy Neighbors"	2026	Jordan Ward	Backward	check	check
"Change of Scenery"	2026	Jordan Ward	Backward	check	check
"Juicy"	2026	Jordan Ward	Backward	check	check
"Themselves"	2026	Jordan Ward	Backward	check	check
"Take-Out"	2026	Jordan Ward	Backward	check	check
"Til Then"	2026	Jordan Ward	Backward	check	check
"Champion Sound"	2026	Jordan Ward	Backward	check	check
"Y"	2026	Jordan Ward	Backward		check
"Cutti" (with Smino)	2026	Jordan Ward	Backward	check	check
"Carsex" (with TiaCorine)	2026	Jordan Ward	Backward	check	check

== Remixes ==
=== As LidoLido ===
Year	Song	Original Artist	Appearance / Notes
2010	"The Brothel"	Susanne Sundfør	Unofficial
2013	"Kiss Kiss"	Cashmere Cat	Mirror Maru (Remixes) – EP
2013	"Bittersweet"	Electric City	Bittersweet (LidoLido Remix) – Single

=== As Lido ===
Year	Song	Original Artist	Appearance / Notes
2014	"TKO"	Justin Timberlake	2014 Remixes
2014	"Billboard"	S-Type	Billboard (Lido Remix) – Single / 2014 Remixes
2014	"Gatorade"	Yung Lean	2014 Remixes
2014	"Latch"	Disclosure feat. Sam Smith	2014 Remixes
2014	"Ain't No Sunshine"	Bill Withers	2014 Remixes
2014	"Superstar" (with Cosmo's Midnight)	AlunaGeorge	Body Music (Remixed) / 2014 Remixes
2014	"Bad Blood"	Bastille	2014 Remixes
2014	"Drowning"	Banks	Free Download / 2014 Remixes
2014	"Faded"	Zhu	Faded – EP / 2014 Remixes
2014	"Walk This Way"	MØ	Walk This Way – EP / 2014 Remixes
2014	"Money" (with Crookers & STS)	Lido	I Love You Too (The Remixtape)
2014	"Often"	The Weeknd	2014 Remixes
2014	"Left Hand Free"	Alt-J	Left Hand Free (Lido Remix) – Single / 2014 Remixes
2014	"Two Bodies"	Flight Facilities feat. Emma Louise	Two Bodies – Remixes / 2014 Remixes
2014	"Why I'm Single"	Alli Simpson	2014 Remixes
2014	"You Too"	Para One	2014 Remixes
2014	"Faded" (with J Heat)	Zhu	2014 Remixes
2014	"Slow" (with Halsey)	Jaden Smith	2014 Remixes. aka Lido & Halsey – Slow
2015	"FourFiveSeconds" (with BrassTracks)	Rihanna, Kanye West, Paul McCartney	Unreleased
2015	"Broken"	Daley	Unreleased
2015	"Planes" (with Chance The Rapper & The Social Experiment)	Jeremih	Free Download
2016	"Sober Thoughts (Lido's Forgotten Sunday service)"	Goldlink	
2017	"Feel It Still (Lido Remix)"	Portugal The Man	
2017	"Crew (Lido Remix)"	Goldlink	
2017	"Messiah (Lido Remix)"	Alison Wonderland	
2017	"Deserve (feat. Travis Scott) - Lido Remix"	Kris Wu	
