= Room 93 =

EP by Halsey
- Released: October 27, 2014
- Recorded: 2014
- Genre: Electropop
- Length: 16:09
- Label: Astralwerks; Virgin EMI UK
- Producer: Dylan Bauld; Dylan Scott; Tim Anderson; Jim Eliot; Chris Braide

Halsey chronology
Room 93 (2014)	Badlands (2015)

Singles from Room 93
- 1. "Ghost" Released: July 28, 2014

Room 93 is the debut extended play (EP) by American singer and songwriter Halsey. It was released on October 27, 2014 by Astralwerks. The project was re-released digitally on March 9, 2015, including a new version of its main single "Ghost"; this new version was later also included on the singer's debut full-length studio album Badlands (2015). The sound of the EP is rooted on the electropop music genre.

A digital remix version of the EP, featuring three remixes for the songs "Hurricane", "Ghost" and "Trouble", was released on March 3, 2015. Along with the remix EP, a "One Mic, One Take" EP was released on the same date. The track "Trouble" was featured on the promo for the episode "Best Laid Plans" from the American TV series Once Upon a Time.

== Critical reception ==
Room 93 ratings
Review scores
Source	Rating
AllMusic	3.5/5 stars

The EP received a generally positive response. AllMusic praised Halsey's Room 93 for its moody, atmospheric electronic pop sound, drawing favorable comparisons to Lana Del Rey and Lorde. The review highlighted the EP as a clear display of the style that earned her a deal with Astralwerks, noting tracks like "Ghost" and "Hurricane" as standout singles.

== Track listing ==
Room 93 track listing
No.	Title	Writer(s)	Producer(s)	Length
1.	"Is There Somewhere"	Ashley Frangipane	Dylan Bauld	3:32
2.	"Ghost"	Frangipane; Dylan Scott	Scott	2:32
3.	"Hurricane"	Frangipane; Tim Anderson	Anderson	3:43
4.	"Empty Gold"	Frangipane; Andy Tongren; Scott; Christian Medice	Jim Eliot; Medice^{[a]}	3:27
5.	"Trouble"	Frangipane; Chris Braide	Braide	3:35
Total length:				16:09

Re-release
No.	Title	Writer(s)	Producer(s)	Length
2.	"Ghost" (alternative mix)	Frangipane; Scott	Scott	2:33
Total length:				16:10

Room 93: Remixes
No.	Title	Writer(s)	Length
1.	"Hurricane" (Arty remix)	Frangipane; Anderson	3:44
2.	"Ghost" (Lost Kings remix)	Frangipane; Scott	3:09
3.	"Trouble" (Sander Kleinenberg remix)	Frangipane; Braide	3:05
Total length:			9:58

Room 93: 1 Mic 1 Take
No.	Title	Writer(s)	Length
1.	"Ghost" (1 Mic 1 Take)	Frangipane; Scott	2:40
2.	"Hurricane" (1 Mic 1 Take)	Frangipane; Anderson	3:45
3.	"Trouble" (1 Mic 1 Take)	Frangipane; Braide	4:11
Total length:			10:36

=== Notes ===
- ^{^[a]} signifies a co-producer.

== Charts ==
Chart (2014)	Peak position
US Billboard 200	159
US Heatseekers Albums (Billboard)	3
US Top Alternative Albums (Billboard)	20
US Top Rock Albums (Billboard)	37

== Release history ==
Date	Format(s)	Label(s)
October 27, 2014	Digital download	Astralwerks
March 3, 2015 (The Remixes)	Digital download	Astralwerks
March 9, 2015 (Reissue)	Digital download	Astralwerks
March 10, 2015	CD	Astralwerks; Universal; Virgin EMI (UK)
March 17, 2015 (1 Mic 1 Take)	Digital download	Astralwerks
April 15, 2015	LP	Astralwerks; Universal; Virgin EMI (UK)
