= California Coast Credit Union =

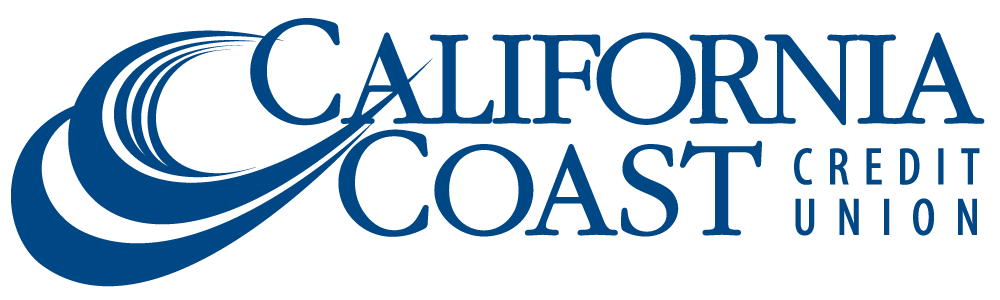
- Type: Cooperative
- Industry: Financial services
- Founded: 1929; 97 years ago in San Diego, California
- Headquarters: San Diego, California, United States
- Number of locations: 26 branches
- Area served: San Diego, California; Riverside, California
- Services: personal and commercial banking
- Total assets: $2,015,035,130 USD (2016)
- Total equity: $235,869,537 USD (2016)
- Members: 140,517 (2016)
- Number of employees: 442 (2016)
- Website: calcoastcu.org

California Coast Credit Union (also known as Cal Coast) is an American credit union in San Diego County, headquartered in San Diego, California. As of 2020, it had more than $3.0 billion in assets, over 192,000 members, 26 branch locations and 540 employees.

== History ==
California Coast Credit Union serves residents who work or live in San Diego or Riverside counties.

The credit union is a part of the CO-OP interbank network, with access to over 30,000 ATMs in the U.S. and Canada. Through that network, the credit union also offers CO-OP Shared Branches, which gives members access to more than 5,400 nationwide branch locations.

== Cal Coast Open Air Amphitheater ==
On January 1, 2014, the credit union purchased the naming rights to San Diego State University’s on-campus amphitheater which would then be called Cal Coast Credit Union Open Air Theater. Formerly called the Greek Bowl and the Open Air Theatre, the amphitheater opened in 1941 and is one of San Diego's longest running outdoor venues.
