= Monica Heldal =

Norwegian musician and songwriter (born 1991)

Monica Heldal (born 24 January 1991 in Bergen, Norway) is a Norwegian musician (vocals, guitar) and songwriter. Her debut studio album, Boy From the North, was released on 4 November 2013. For the album she received two awards during Spellemannprisen in 2013: Rookie of the Year and Best Pop Solo Artist. She also won the Bendiksenprisen in 2013 and was nominated for the Statoil Scholarship that same year.

== Early life and career ==
Monica Heldal was born in Arna, Norway, on 24 January 1991. At 16, she began to play and compose music, writing the song "Silly Willy", which was later included in her studio debut.

== Style and influences ==
Heldal's musical style draws from many different musical genres, primarily folk and blues. The latter is inspired by her main influence, Rory Gallagher. She is well known for her use of fingerpicking technique and various complex guitar tunings, much like one of her other sources of inspiration, Nick Drake.

== Collaborations ==
In 2012 Monica Heldal was featured in the song Burgh Island of The Burgh Island EP by the English singer-songwriter Ben Howard, where she is both playing guitar and singing.

== Awards ==
- Rookie of the Year (2013), Spellemannprisen
- Best Pop Solo Artist (2013), Spellemannprisen
- Bendiksenprisen (2013)

== Discography ==
- Boy From the North (2013)
- The One in the Sun (2016)
- Ravensdale (2021)

Awards
| Preceded by No Pop vocalist award | Recipient of the Pop vocalist Spellemannprisen; 2013 | Succeeded by Emilie Nicolas |
| Preceded by LidoLido | Recipient of the Newcomer Spellemannprisen; 2013 | Succeeded by Emilie Nicolas |
