= High (Young Rising Sons song) =

Single by Young Rising Sons

from the album Young Rising Sons
- Released: July 22, 2014
- Recorded: 2014
- Genre: Pop rock; indie pop; minimal pop; rock
- Length: 2:46
- Label: Dirty Canvas; Interscope

Young Rising Sons singles chronology
"High" (2014)	"F**ked Up" (2015)

"High" is a song recorded by New Jersey band Young Rising Sons, released as the band's debut single on July 22, 2014. It was featured on their debut self-titled EP on July 22, 2014. It also was featured on The High EP in the form of remixes and acoustic sessions.

The song was featured in many advertisements in 2015, such as for Hulu and Pepsi. It was also featured in the trailer for Netflix's Green Eggs and Ham.

== Critical reception ==
The Music Court said that "the song must be a smash hit, peak very high on music charts". Music fans said that "they're shocked why people don't know this song a lot, this is a masterpiece, this is a superb minimal pop mixed with rock song".

== Music video ==
The music video for the single is uploaded on their Vevo channel at YouTube with two music videos, one with the scene in black and white color (also known as Red Bank Version), captured at Red Bank, New Jersey, uploaded on July 3, 2014; another one with the scene they are in the country and the band's singer, Andy Tongren, uploaded on January 21, 2015.
