= DJ Kalkutta =

- Also known as: Bollywood Barbie
- Born: Kolkata, India
- Origin: Wisconsin, United States
- Occupations: DJ; turntablist; record producer; songwriter
- Website: djkalkutta.com

DJ Kalkutta is an American DJ and producer, based in New York City.

== Early life ==
Born in Kolkata, India, she, at the age of two, was given to an orphanage by her biological parents. As she spent her infancy there, an American woman adopted and raised her in Wisconsin, United States. Her stage name Kalkutta, which refers to the German name of the Indian City Kolkata, is a homage to her biological family and her adoptive mother. Upon moving to New York City at the age of seventeen, she took up audio engineering and production studies at Clive Davis Institute of Recorded Music, before quitting. Later, she produced and uploaded music to Myspace. Her former partner suggested her to get into DJing as it is "like a walk in the park compared to production stuff." Growing up in a community where racial diversity is almost non-existent, and not knowing of her racial identity, Kalkutta assumed her ethnicity to be black until the age of seventeen.

== Career ==
She co-wrote Halsey's song "New Americana".
