= Badlands (Halsey album) =

2015 studio album by Halsey

Studio album by Halsey
- Released: August 28, 2015
- Recorded: 2014–2015
- Genres: Electropop; alt-pop; dark pop; synth-pop
- Length: 40:03
- Label: Astralwerks
- Producers: Tim Anderson; Captain Cuts; The Futuristics; Charlie Hugall; Tim Larcombe; Lido; Sam Miller; Justyn Pilbrow; S.A.; Dylan Scott; Trevor Simpson; Dylan William

Halsey chronology
Room 93 (2014)	Badlands (2015)	Hopeless Fountain Kingdom (2017)

Singles from Badlands
- 1. "Ghost" Released: July 28, 2014; 2. "New Americana" Released: July 10, 2015; 3. "Colors" Released: February 9, 2016; 4. "Castle" Released: April 9, 2016

Badlands (stylized in all caps) is the debut studio album by American singer Halsey. It was released on August 28, 2015 through Astralwerks. Musically, Badlands is an electropop, alternative pop, dark pop, and synth-pop record featuring industrial undertones. Halsey wrote every song on the album when she was 19, while production was handled by a number of producers. Norwegian producer Lido was one of the main producers on Badlands.

The album entered Billboard 200 at number two, earning 115,000 equivalent units — including 97,000 in pure album sales. It was eventually certified double Platinum by the Recording Industry Association of America (RIAA). Badlands found success in many countries outside of the United States; it reached the top ten of the music charts of Australia, Belgium, Canada, Ireland, New Zealand, the Netherlands, Portugal, Scotland and the United Kingdom. It was also certified Gold in several countries, including Australia, Brazil, Canada, and the United Kingdom. The album was further promoted by Halsey's debut headlining world concert tour, the Badlands Tour (2015–2016).

The album was preceded by the release of two singles: "Ghost", which was also a re-released single from Halsey's introductory EP Room 93 (2014), and "New Americana", which peaked at number 60 on the Billboard Hot 100 songs chart in the United States, marking Halsey's first appearance on the chart. The third single from the album, "Colors", was released on February 9, 2016, and became the album's most streamed track on Spotify; it also became the album's best-selling track worldwide. A new version of the song "Castle" was released as the album's fourth single to promote the feature film The Huntsman: Winter's War (2016). "Hold Me Down" was released as the first promotional single ahead of the album on June 1, 2015. It was certified Gold in Australia and the US. "Drive" was released as the second and final promotional single on August 21, 2015. The track is certified Gold in the US. Outside of the singles, other tracks from the album that achieved notable certifications were "Gasoline", "Hurricane", and "Control". Furthermore, "Roman Holiday" was featured in the second season of the American TV series Younger and "I Walk the Line" was featured in the teaser trailer for the film Power Rangers (2017).

== Composition ==
"Empty Gold"
A 19-second sample of "Empty Gold", included in the Japanese edition of Badlands

The name "Badlands" refers to Halsey's state of mind while writing the album, to give a physical place as a metaphor for a desolate and lonely mind. Musically, it is a pop album in the styles of electropop, alternative pop, dark pop, and synth-pop with industrial undertones.

== Production ==
According to Halsey, Badlands is a concept album focusing on the fictional dystopian society known as The Badlands. A desert wasteland surrounds the city, keeping the inhabitants of The Badlands captive. The album was inspired by post-apocalyptic films such as The Fifth Element. After writing the first few songs, Halsey realized the entire concept was a metaphor for her mental state. Halsey states she created the Badlands to escape from her real-life struggles. In her opinion, the metaphor was even with no escape, there is still hope there is somewhere else to go. Lido served as the album's executive producer.

== Singles ==
"Ghost" was released as Halsey's debut single on July 28, 2014, with an accompanying music video filmed in Tokyo, which was directed by Malia James and Ryan Witt. "Ghost" was released to radio on April 7, 2015. "New Americana" was released as the second single from the album on July 10, 2015. The official music video premiered on September 25, 2015. The song peaked at number 60 on the Billboard Hot 100, being the only single from Badlands to enter the chart. It has since been certified Platinum in Canada, Italy, and the US and Gold in Australia and New Zealand.

Halsey announced "Colors" as the third single on January 21, 2016. It impacted alternative radio on February 9, 2016 with its music video being released a few weeks later on February 25, 2016 featuring Tyler Posey. It reached number eight on the Bubbling Under Hot 100 and was certified Silver in the UK, Gold in Australia, and double Platinum in the US. The fourth and final single, "Castle", was released on April 9, 2016 as part of the soundtrack for the film The Huntsman: Winter's War which features an alternative version of the song. The music video later premiered on April 13, 2016 and peaked at number one on the Bubbling Under Hot 100 It was certified Gold in Australia and Platinum in the US.

=== Promotional singles ===
On June 1, 2015, Halsey announced via Twitter the pre-order for Badlands along with the release of the album's first promotional single, "Hold Me Down". The song became one of the album's most popular tracks achieving over 100 million streams on Spotify and being certified Gold in Australia and the US. On August 21, 2015, "Drive" was released as the album's second and final promotional single.

== Critical reception ==
Badlands ratings
Review scores
Source	Rating
AllMusic	3.5/5 stars
Alternative Addiction	4.5/5 stars
Pitchfork	4.9/10
Rolling Stone	3.5/5 stars
Vice	A−

In a review for Pitchfork, Nathan Reese wrote, "Reading interviews with Halsey you get the sense of a canny and talented performer, one who legitimately wants to connect with fans. But the public persona only comes through on Badlands in fits and starts, and there isn't a single subversive or original second on the album." About the chorus on "New Americana", he commented, "Like most of Badlands, it's calculated, defiant, and, ultimately, hollow." In a short review, Rolling Stone's Joe Levy called Halsey a "new popstar with a knack for sticky imagery". The album was included at number six on Rock Sound's top 50 releases of 2015 list.

== Commercial performance ==
The album debuted at number two on the Billboard 200 with a total of 115,000 equivalent units (97,000 in pure album sales), which marked the highest-charting album released by the Astralwerks record company so far. As of June 2017, the album had sold 520,000 copies in the US. In December 2017, it was announced that Badlands had reached one billion streams on Spotify. Badlands was later certified 2× platinum by the Recording Industry Association of America for sales of two million units in the United States.

The album debuted at number nine on the UK Albums Chart, selling 8,225 copies in its first week. By June 2017, it had sold 106,804 copies in the United Kingdom. Elsewhere, Badlands reached number two in Australia, number three in New Zealand and Ireland, number five in the Netherlands, and number 10 in Belgium (Flanders).

== Track listing ==
Badlands – Standard edition
No.	Title	Writer(s)	Producer(s)	Length
1.	"Castle"	Ashley Frangipane; Peder Losnegård	Lido	4:37
2.	"Hold Me Down"	Frangipane; Joseph Khajadourian; Alex Schwartz; Ryan Lott	The Futuristics; Lido^{[a]}	3:24
3.	"New Americana"	Frangipane; Larzz Principato; Chandra Uber; James Mtume	Lido; Kalkutta^{[a]}; Principato^{[a]}	3:03
4.	"Drive"	Frangipane; Tim Anderson	Anderson; Lido^{[a]}; Aron Forbes^{[a]}; Chris Spilfogel^{[a]}	4:18
5.	"Roman Holiday"	Frangipane; Ryan McMahon; Benjamin Berger	Captain Cuts	3:21
6.	"Colors"	Frangipane; Dylan Bauld	Dylan William; Lido^{[a]}	4:09
7.	"Coming Down"	Frangipane; Justyn Pilbrow	Pilbrow; Lido^{[a]}	3:43
8.	"Haunting"	Frangipane; Charlie Hugall; Rob Tortelli; Chris Hugall	S.A.; Charlie Hugall; Lido^{[a]}; Heavy Mellow^{[a]}	4:20
9.	"Control"	Frangipane; Roy Kerr; Tim Bran	Lido	3:34
10.	"Young God"	Frangipane	Lido; William^{[a]}; Heavy Mellow^{[a]}	3:00
11.	"Ghost"	Frangipane; Dylan Scott Quagliato	Scott	2:33
Total length:				40:03

Badlands – Deluxe edition
No.	Title	Writer(s)	Producer(s)	Length
5.	"Hurricane"	Frangipane; Anderson	Anderson	3:43
6.	"Roman Holiday"	Frangipane; McMahon; Berger	Captain Cuts	3:21
7.	"Ghost"	Frangipane; Scott	Scott	2:33
8.	"Colors"	Frangipane; Bauld	William; Lido^{[a]}	4:09
9.	"Colors Pt. II"	Frangipane; Bauld	William	1:36
10.	"Strange Love"	Frangipane; Jim Eliot; Tim Larcombe	Larcombe; Lido^{[a]}; Yung Gud^{[a]}	4:07
11.	"Coming Down"	Frangipane; Pilbrow	Pilbrow; Lido^{[a]}	3:43
12.	"Haunting"	Frangipane; Charlie Hugall; Tortelli; Chris Hugall	S.A.; Charlie Hugall; Lido^{[a]}; Heavy Mellow^{[a]}	4:20
13.	"Gasoline"	Frangipane; Losnegård	Lido	3:19
14.	"Control"	Frangipane; Kerr; Bran	Lido	3:34
15.	"Young God"	Frangipane	Lido; William^{[a]}; Heavy Mellow^{[a]}	3:00
16.	"I Walk the Line"	Johnny Cash	Trevor Simpson; Sam Miller	2:45
Total length:				55:33

Badlands – Japanese CD edition
No.	Title	Writer(s)	Producer(s)	Length
17.	"Is There Somewhere"	Frangipane	William	3:31
18.	"Empty Gold"	Frangipane; Scott	Eliot; Christian Medice^{[a]}	4:18
19.	"Trouble" (stripped)	Frangipane; Chris Braide	Braide	3:34
20.	"Hurricane" (Arty Remix)	Frangipane; Anderson	Scott; Artem Stolyarov^{[b]}	3:44
21.	"Ghost" (Lost Kings Remix)	Frangipane; Scott	Scott; Lost Kings^{[b]}	3:09
22.	"Trouble" (Sander Kleinenberg Remix)	Frangipane; Braide	Braide; Kleinenberg^{[b]}	3:05
Total length:				76:54

Badlands – Deluxe box set 7-inch vinyl
No.	Title	Writer(s)	Producer(s)	Length
1.	"You(th)" (demo)	Frangipane	Anderson	1:01
2.	"Drive" (demo)	Frangipane; Anderson	Anderson	4:34
Total length:				5:35

Badlands – Decade edition
No.	Title	Length
1.	"Castle"	4:37
2.	"Hold Me Down"	3:24
3.	"New Americana"	3:03
4.	"Drive"	4:18
5.	"Hurricane"	3:43
6.	"Roman Holiday"	3:21
7.	"Ghost"	2:33
8.	"Colors"	4:09
9.	"Coming Down"	3:43
10.	"Haunting"	4:20
11.	"Gasoline"	3:19
12.	"Control"	3:34
13.	"Young God"	3:00
Total length:		47:05

Badlands – Decade edition anthology - alternate original deluxe tracklist
No.	Title	Length
9.	"Colors Pt. II"	1:36
10.	"Strange Love"	4:07
11.	"Coming Down"	3:43
12.	"Haunting"	4:20
13.	"Gasoline"	3:19
14.	"Control"	3:34
15.	"Young God"	3:00
16.	"I Walk the Line"	2:45
Total length:		55:33

=== Notes ===
- ^{^[a]} signifies an additional producer.
- ^{^[b]} signifies a remixer.

=== Sample credits ===
- "Hold Me Down" contains a sample of "Easy" (2014) by Son Lux.
- "New Americana" contains an interpolation of "Juicy Fruit" (1983) by Mtume.

== Badlands (Decade Edition Anthology) ==
Badlands (Decade Edition Anthology)

Studio album (reissue) by Halsey
- Released: August 29, 2025
- Length: 1:59:26 (digital); 1:52:03 (physical)
- Label: Capitol

Halsey chronology
The Great Impersonator (2024)	Badlands (Decade Edition Anthology) (2025)	The Girl in the Tower - Live (2026)

Badlands (Decade Edition Anthology), also referred to in some sources as Badlands: Anthology, is the 10th anniversary edition/reissue of Badlands. The reissue was released on August 29, 2025 by Capitol Records, and marks the 10 year anniversary of Halsey's debut studio album. On August 1, Halsey announced that for the entire anniversary month that she would be honoring her debut album in various ways. Prior to the announcement, select fans on Halsey's mailing list had been receiving Badlands themed postcards.

The first of the month saw Halsey release three new vinyl sets on her store website. These included a pressing of the original 2015 standard edition tracklist with new cover art, a new pressing of the live album Badlands (Live from Webster Hall) (2020), and the deluxe "Anthology" edition; as well as a CD version of the reissue. The new edition tracklist features the 16 songs on the original deluxe edition, a studio version of the unreleased song "Garden", demo versions of "Drive" and the unreleased song "You(th)", "Is There Somewhere" and "Empty Gold" from Halsey's debut EP Room 93 (2014), live versions from Room 93: 1 Mic 1 Take (2015), orchestral and remix versions of select tracks, and the stripped version of "Trouble" (also from Room 93). The digital release also includes the stripped version of "Colors", which was not included on the physical editions. A 2015 demo of "Garden" was later added to the project in a digital reissue, as the last track.

=== Track listing ===
Badlands (Decade Edition Anthology) digital edition
No.	Title	Length
1.	"Castle"	4:37
2.	"Hold Me Down"	3:24
3.	"New Americana"	3:03
4.	"Drive"	4:18
5.	"Hurricane"	3:43
6.	"Roman Holiday"	3:21
7.	"Ghost"	2:33
8.	"Colors"	4:09
9.	"Colors Pt. II"	1:36
10.	"Strange Love"	4:07
11.	"Coming Down"	3:43
12.	"Haunting"	4:20
13.	"Gasoline"	3:19
14.	"Control"	3:34
15.	"Young God"	3:00
16.	"I Walk the Line" (Johnny Cash cover)	2:45
17.	"Colors" (orchestral)	3:59
18.	"Drive" (orchestral)	3:45
19.	"Gasoline" (orchestral)	3:08
20.	"New Americana" (orchestral)	3:07
21.	"Young God" (orchestral)	2:47
22.	"Garden"	3:15
23.	"Colors" (stripped)	4:26
24.	"You(th)" (demo)	1:00
25.	"Drive" (demo)	4:21
26.	"Ghost" (live)	2:40
27.	"Hurricane" (live)	3:45
28.	"Trouble" (live)	4:11
29.	"Is There Somewhere"	3:31
30.	"Empty Gold"	3:28
31.	"Trouble" (stripped)	3:35
32.	"Hurricane" (Arty Remix)	3:43
33.	"Ghost" (Lost Kings Remix)	3:08
34.	"Trouble" (Sander Kleinenberg Remix)	3:05
35.	"Garden" (2015 demo)	2:57
Total length:		1:59:26

=== Notes ===
- The 2015 demo of "Garden" became included on October 14, 2025, following a digital reupload of the release.
- Physical editions of the Anthology have the bonus tracks placed on the separate disc, doesn't include stripped version of "Colors" and has "Garden" placed after the demo version of "Drive".

== Personnel ==
Credits were adapted from the liner notes of the deluxe edition of Badlands.

=== Musicians ===
- Halsey – vocals
- Jayda Brown – children's choir (3)
- Emma Gunn – children's choir (3)
- Levi Gunn – children's choir (3)
- Merit Leighton – children's choir (3)
- Mason Purece – children's choir (3)
- Tim Anderson – all instruments (except guitar), programming (4)
- Aron Forbes – guitar (4)
- Chris Spilfogel – additional programming (4)
- Dan Grech-Marguerat – additional programming

=== Technical ===
- Lido – production (1, 3, 13–15); additional production (2, 4, 8, 10–12); executive production
- The Futuristics – production (2)
- Kalkutta – additional production (3)
- Larzz Principato – additional production (3)
- Tim Anderson – production (4, 5)
- Aron Forbes – additional production (4)
- Chris Spilfogel – additional production (4)
- Captain Cuts – production (6)
- Dylan Scott – production (7)
- Dylan William – production (8, 9); additional production (15); vocal production
- Tim Larcombe – production (10)
- Yung Gud – additional production (10)
- Justyn Pilbrow – production (11)
- S.A. – production (12)
- Charlie Hugall – production (12)
- Heavy Mellow – additional production (12, 15)
- Trevor Simpson – production (16)
- Sam Miller – production (16)
- Dan Grech-Marguerat – mix
- Pete Lyman – mastering

=== Artwork ===
- Sarah Barlow – photography
- Stephen Schofield – photography
- Garrett Hilliker – art direction

== Charts ==
=== Weekly charts ===
Chart (2015–2016)	Peak position
Australian Albums (ARIA)	2
Austrian Albums (Ö3 Austria)	18
Belgian Albums (Ultratop Flanders)	10
Belgian Albums (Ultratop Wallonia)	28
Canadian Albums (Billboard)	3
Danish Albums (Hitlisten)	19
Dutch Albums (Album Top 100)	5
Finnish Albums (Suomen virallinen lista)	36
French Albums (SNEP)	75
German Albums (Offizielle Top 100)	37
Greek Albums (IFPI)	43
Irish Albums (IRMA)	3
Italian Albums (FIMI)	34
New Zealand Albums (RMNZ)	3
Norwegian Albums (VG-lista)	22
Portuguese Albums (AFP)	10
Scottish Albums (Official Charts)	7
Spanish Albums (Promusicae)	48
Swedish Albums (Sverigetopplistan)	13
Swiss Albums (Schweizer Hitparade)	26
UK Albums (Official Charts)	9
US Billboard 200	2
US Top Alternative Albums (Billboard)	1

Chart (2025)	Peak position
German Pop Albums (Offizielle Top 100)	6

=== Year-end charts ===
Chart (2015)	Position
Australian Albums (ARIA)	88
US Billboard 200	98

Chart (2016)	Position
Australian Albums (ARIA)	54
Canadian Albums (Billboard)	47
US Billboard 200	34
US Top Alternative Albums (Billboard)	11

Chart (2017)	Position
US Billboard 200	79
US Top Catalog Albums (Billboard)	31

== Certifications ==
Certifications for Badlands
Region	Certification	Certified units/sales
Australia (ARIA)	Platinum	70,000^{‡}
Brazil (Pro-Música Brasil)	Platinum	40,000^{‡}
Brazil (Pro-Música Brasil) deluxe	Platinum	40,000^{‡}
Canada (Music Canada)	2× Platinum	160,000^{‡}
Denmark (IFPI Danmark)	Gold	10,000^{‡}
New Zealand (RMNZ)	Platinum	15,000^{‡}
Norway (IFPI Norway)	Platinum	20,000^{‡}
Poland (ZPAV)	Platinum	20,000^{‡}
Singapore (RIAS)	Gold	5,000^{*}
Sweden (GLF)	Gold	15,000^{‡}
United Kingdom (BPI)	Gold	106,804
United States (RIAA)	2× Platinum	2,000,000^{‡}
^{*} Sales figures based on certification alone.^{‡} Sales+streaming figures based on certification alone.

== Release history ==
Badlands release history
Region	Date	Format	Edition	Label	Ref.
Various	August 28, 2015	CD; digital download; LP; cassette	Standard	Astralwerks; Universal; Virgin EMI (UK)	
Philippines	June 17, 2016	CD	Deluxe	Astralwerks; MCA	
Various	August 29, 2025	CD; digital download; LP	Decade Edition Anthology	Capitol	
