= Hurricane (Halsey song) =

Promotional single by Halsey

from the EP Room 93 and the album Badlands
- Released: October 11, 2014
- Recorded: 2014
- Genre: Synth-pop
- Length: 3:43
- Label: Astralwerks
- Songwriters: Halsey; Tim Anderson
- Producer: Anderson

Music video
- "Hurricane" on YouTube

"Hurricane" is a song by American singer and songwriter Halsey. First appearing on her extended play (EP), Room 93 (2014), the song was re-released on her debut studio album, Badlands (2015). The song was written by Halsey and Tim Anderson. It was released as a promotional single on October 11, 2014. The Arty remix was featured in the 2016 film Nerve starring Emma Roberts and Dave Franco.

== Music video ==
The official music video for "Hurricane" premiered on October 16, 2014. Directed by Alex de Bonrepos, the video stars Halsey herself alongside Sideara St. Claire. It was filmed at the Pink Motel in Los Angeles, which was also the location of her first music video for the song "Ghost". The video was singled out by Billboard Magazine for an exclusive debut. It has since accumulated over 40 million views on YouTube.

== Composition ==
Halsey drew her inspiration for "Hurricane" from the literary-fiction novel, The Wanderess, by Roman Payne (2013).

The song was also inspired by her friend Zach, an older guy she was seeing.

== Certifications ==
Region	Certification	Certified units/sales
Brazil (Pro-Música Brasil)	Platinum	60,000^{‡}
New Zealand (RMNZ)	Gold	15,000^{‡}
United States (RIAA)	Platinum	1,000,000^{‡}
Streaming
Sweden (GLF)	Gold	4,000,000^{†}
^{‡} Sales+streaming figures based on certification alone.^{†} Streaming-only figures based on certification alone.
