= Gasoline (Halsey song) =

Song by Halsey

from the album Badlands
- Released: August 28, 2015
- Recorded: 2015
- Genre: Electropop
- Length: 3:20
- Label: Astralwerks
- Songwriters: Halsey; Peder Losnegård
- Producer: Lido

Music video
- "Gasoline" on YouTube

"Gasoline" is a song by American singer and songwriter Halsey. The track is included on the deluxe edition of her debut studio album Badlands (2015). It was written by Halsey and Lido; the latter also producing the song. Despite only being included on the deluxe edition of Badlands and not being released as a single, it is the album's most streamed track on Spotify with more than 410 million plays and is the album's second most viewed video on YouTube with over 140 million views.

A reproduced version of the song titled "Gasoline (Reimagined)" was included on the Target exclusive edition of Halsey's fourth studio album If I Can't Have Love, I Want Power (2021). Halsey performed this version during her virtual Moment House concert a few days after the album's release.

== Background ==
In an interview with Popjustice, Halsey confirmed that she submitted Badlands twelve days after expected, being the song written and produced the day the album was initially planned to be out. She described the track as self-aware, considering it a synopsis for the album and as she said, "what I thought the record was missing". She also expressed her interest in people buying the deluxe version of the record on purpose for them to get the track.

== Composition ==
The song is described as a "brooding electropop track." The track is written about Halsey's experience with mental health, her bipolar disorder and her feeling out of step with the rest of society.

== Critical reception ==
Kitty Empire from The Guardian described the track, "one of the harder-hitting songs on [...]Badlands". Tina Roumeliotis from Buzznet called the song "a crowd-pleaser" while Billboard's Chris Payne considers it "a fan favourite". It has more than 300 million plays on streaming platform Spotify.

== Certifications ==
Region	Certification	Certified units/sales
Australia (ARIA)	Gold	35,000^{‡}
Brazil (Pro-Música Brasil)	Platinum	60,000^{‡}
New Zealand (RMNZ)	Platinum	30,000^{‡}
Poland (ZPAV)	Platinum	50,000^{‡}
United Kingdom (BPI)	Gold	400,000^{‡}
United States (RIAA)	3× Platinum	3,000,000^{‡}
Streaming
Sweden (GLF)	Gold	4,000,000^{†}
^{‡} Sales+streaming figures based on certification alone.^{†} Streaming-only figures based on certification alone.
