= Ghost (Halsey song) =

2014 Single by Halsey

Single by Halsey

from the EP Room 93 and the album Badlands
- Released: July 28, 2014
- Recorded: 2014
- Genre: Synth-pop
- Length: 2:32 (original mix); 2:33 (alternative mix)
- Label: Astralwerks
- Songwriter(s): Ashley Frangipane; Dylan Scott
- Producer(s): Dylan Scott

Halsey singles chronology
"SOS" (Demo) (2012)	"Ghost" (2014)	"New Americana" (2015)

Music video
- "Ghost" on YouTube

"Ghost" is the debut single by American singer and songwriter Halsey from her debut studio album, Badlands (2015). The lyrics and musical composition are attributed to Halsey and Young Rising Sons' past member Dylan Scott. It was first released on February 3, 2014, on SoundCloud. On July 28, 2014, it was officially released by her record label and later included on her debut extended play, Room 93 (2014). It was re-released as a single from her debut studio album, Badlands, along the re-release of the EP on March 9, 2015, through Astralwerks. Critical reception for the song was generally positive. The accompanying music video has received over 60 million views on video-sharing website YouTube.

== Background ==
"Ghost" was posted on Halsey's SoundCloud page for streaming on February 3, 2014. The song garnered online buzz which was an opening opportunity for Halsey to sign a record deal with Astralwerks, leading to the eventual publication of the Room 93 EP and additional videos for "Hurricane" and "Ghost". Halsey expressed about the song, "The concept of the song itself is about being in a relationship with someone who isn't emotionally available: you feel their physical presence but the emotional one isn't there."

== Music videos ==
The first music video for "Ghost", was directed by Alex de Bonrepos and premiered on October 27, 2014. It was filmed at the Pink Motel in Los Angeles, which was also the location of her music video for her song "Hurricane". The video begins with her kissing her boyfriend (played by model AJ English) in the motel room, but soon takes a dangerous turn as the two begin to fight.

A second official music video for "Ghost", featuring the alternative mix, was filmed in Tokyo and was directed by Malia James and Ryan Witt in late May 2015. Halsey said she was satisfied with the outcome. It premiered on June 11, 2015.

== Track listing ==
Digital download
No.	Title	Writer(s)	Producer(s)	Length
1.	"Ghost"	Ashley Frangipane; Dylan Scott	Scott	2:32

Digital download – Alternative mix
No.	Title	Writer(s)	Producer(s)	Length
1.	"Ghost"	Frangipane; Scott	Scott	2:33

Lost Kings Remix
No.	Title	Writer(s)	Producer(s)	Length
1.	"Ghost (Lost Kings Remix)"	Frangipane; Scott	Scott; Lost Kings^{[a]}	3:09

^{^[a]} signifies a remixer.

== Certifications ==
Region	Certification	Certified units/sales
Australia (ARIA)	Gold	35,000^{‡}
New Zealand (RMNZ)	Gold	15,000^{‡}
United States (RIAA)	Platinum	1,000,000^{‡}
^{‡} Sales+streaming figures based on certification alone.

== Live performances ==
"Ghost" was performed by Halsey in a number of live appearances in 2015, including at the Billboard Hot 100 Festival in New York.

== Release history ==
Date	Format	Label	Reference
February 3, 2014	Streaming	Self-released	
July 28, 2014	Digital download	Astralwerks	
March 9, 2015	Digital download (alternative mix)	Astralwerks	
