= New Americana =

2015 single by Halsey

Single by Halsey

from the album Badlands
- Released: July 10, 2015
- Recorded: 2014 (vocals)
- Genre: Alternative pop; electropop
- Length: 3:03
- Label: Astralwerks; Capitol
- Songwriters: Ashley Frangipane; Larzz Principato; Kalkutta; James Mtume
- Producer: Lido

Halsey singles chronology
"Ghost" (2014)	"New Americana" (2015)	"Colors" (2016)

Music video
- "New Americana" on YouTube

"New Americana" is a song by American singer and songwriter Halsey from her debut studio album, Badlands (2015). It was released on July 10, 2015 through Astralwerks as the album's second single. It was written by Halsey, Larzz Principato, and Kalkutta, while production was handled by Lido. Described as an alternative pop and electronic pop song, "New Americana" describes the normalization of aspects of counterculture in the United States, including recreational marijuana use and same-sex marriage. The original version of the song was first released on March 31, 2014 via Halsey's official SoundCloud account for streaming and free download.

== Composition ==
"New Americana" is a midtempo alternative pop and electronic pop song that blends electronica and pop. According to the digital sheet music published by Alfred Publishing Co., Inc., the song is composed in the key of C minor with an approximate tempo of 87 BPM and a vocal range of B♭_{3}-C_{5}. The track also contains an interpolation of "Juicy Fruit" by Mtume. Halsey's voice is layered on the chorus, similar to Pink Floyd's hit, "Another Brick in the Wall".

In an interview with Oyster, Halsey was asked "How do you deal with the frustration of your work being misunderstood?" She replied:

It's so frustrating when people don't understand the satire of 'New Americana'. They think it's this insane basic pop song, but that's the point. I wrote a song critiquing pop culture and I made it sound like a huge pop song. People are writing angry think pieces about how they don't appreciate me rhyming 'legal marijuana' with 'Biggie and Nirvana'. The whole point is for it to be a buzzworthy song. I'm making fun of current pop culture. Has anyone heard the bridge? I say: 'What kind of bubble gum have you been blowing lately?' In my other songs, I'd never say something like that. But the whole point of that lyric is me saying, 'What kind of bullshit have you been talking? What kind of vapid things have you been obsessed with lately?' Honestly though, the fact people miss the point of the song is driving me fucking insane.

Halsey has since deemed the track her worst song, elaborating that she got "burnt out" on it. She no longer performs the song live.

== Critical reception ==
The song charted for one week at number 22 on the Bubbling Under Hot 100 before re-entering on the chart six weeks later at number 5, and debuting on the main Hot 100 at number 97 the week following. It has been characterized by several critics, including Billboard, USA Today, and The New York Times, as a "generational anthem" for millennials. Nathan Reese of Pitchfork was unconvinced by the song's lyrics, describing the song as "plasticky" and superficial where it aimed to be inspirational. He concluded reviewing the chorus, finding it "calculated, defiant, and, ultimately, hollow". In June 2017, Halsey named it as her worst song released to date. She claimed she was tired of having to always revisit the song.

== Music video ==
On September 25, 2015, the official video premiered on MTV, and was posted on Halsey's Vevo and YouTube accounts shortly after. The video's dystopian setting has been compared to that of The Hunger Games series. The music video featured a single version of "New Americana" in which included different background vocals, a short instrumental before the bridge, and different mixing.

=== Synopsis ===
The video opens with an intro of mountain scenery recorded in VHS style with a voice-over of Halsey stating "We were a community. They made me their leader even when I never asked to be. But the lightning in their eyes heralded me to whatever they needed me to become. We were hopeful we would win because nothing could scare us. We feared no city and we feared no man." As the song begins to play, Halsey is then shown joining and being captive with a group of Americans doing unexceptional things. They are then barged in by troops who line them up and take Halsey as hostage since she is presumably the leader of the Americans. She is then dragged to a village where she is tied up to a bonfire. While being poured over with gasoline, Halsey pleads for help but no one responds until immediately before being lit up, when she is then rescued by the Americans. After escaping the troops, Halsey and the Americans are then shown heading out of the forest and running away from the village. The video ends with an instrumental of "Drive" featuring Halsey lying on the ground somewhere similar to the mountains as seen on the opening of the video with a backdrop of a city covered in mist. She is seen wearing a white dystopian outfit and left with nothing but car keys and a radio which she then reaches out to and tries to unravel.

== Live performances ==
In August 2015, Halsey performed "New Americana" at Jimmy Kimmel Live! and again in October 2015 at The Late Show with Stephen Colbert.

== Charts ==
Chart (2015–16)	Peak position
Belgium (Ultratip Bubbling Under Flanders)	84
Canada Hot 100 (Billboard)	57
Canada CHR/Top 40 (Billboard)	36
Canada Rock (Billboard)	31
Czech Republic Singles Digital (ČNS IFPI)	34
Ireland (IRMA)	89
Italy (FIMI)	24
New Zealand Heatseekers (RMNZ)	1
Slovakia Singles Digital (ČNS IFPI)	28
UK Singles (Official Charts Company)	184
US Billboard Hot 100	60
US Alternative Airplay (Billboard)	18
US Adult Pop Airplay (Billboard)	27
US Pop Airplay (Billboard)	25
US Rock & Alternative Airplay (Billboard)	27

== Certifications ==
Region	Certification	Certified units/sales
Australia (ARIA)	Gold	35,000^{‡}
Brazil (Pro-Música Brasil)	Gold	30,000^{‡}
Canada (Music Canada)	Platinum	80,000^{‡}
Italy (FIMI)	Platinum	50,000^{‡}
New Zealand (RMNZ)	Platinum	30,000^{‡}
Norway (IFPI Norway)	Gold	30,000^{‡}
Poland (ZPAV)	Gold	25,000^{‡}
United Kingdom (BPI)	Silver	200,000^{‡}
United States (RIAA)	2× Platinum	2,000,000^{‡}
Streaming
Sweden (GLF)	Gold	4,000,000^{†}
^{‡} Sales+streaming figures based on certification alone.^{†} Streaming-only figures based on certification alone.

== Release history ==
Region	Date	Format	Label	Ref.
Various	March 31, 2014 (original version)	Streaming; free digital download	Self-released	
United States	July 10, 2015	Digital download	Astralwerks	
United States	July 20, 2015	Modern rock radio	Astralwerks; Capitol	
United States	September 21, 2015	Adult album alternative radio	Astralwerks; Capitol	
United States	September 22, 2015	Contemporary hit radio	Astralwerks; Capitol	
