= Hold Me Down (Halsey song) =

Promotional single by Halsey

from the album Badlands
- Released: June 1, 2015
- Length: 3:24
- Label: Astralwerks
- Songwriters: Ashley Frangipane; Joe Khajadourian; Alex Schwartz; Ryan Lott
- Producers: The Futuristics; Lido

Audio video
- ”Hold Me Down” on YouTube

"Hold Me Down" is a song by American singer Halsey, which samples Son Lux's "Easy". It was released on June 1, 2015, through Astralwerks as a promotional single from her debut studio album, Badlands (2015). It was released alongside the album pre-order. It has since accumulated over 100 million streams on Spotify and has been certified Gold in Australia and the US.

During a show in June 2015, one of the song's first live performances, Halsey explained the inspiration and meaning behind the song: "I was meeting a bunch of mean, old men who thought they knew better than I. And I met this one guy in particular, a certain asshole who inspired this song. This song is a reminder that no matter how small you are or how small people may make you seem, you should never let anything hold you down." She later performed the song during VEVO Lift Live in August 2015 following the album's release.

== Certifications ==
Region	Certification	Certified units/sales
Australia (ARIA)	Gold	35,000^{‡}
United States (RIAA)	Platinum	1,000,000^{‡}
^{‡} Sales+streaming figures based on certification alone.
