= Colors (Halsey song) =

2016 single by Halsey

Single by Halsey

from the album Badlands
- Released: February 9, 2016
- Genre: Electropop
- Length: 4:09
- Label: Astralwerks; Capitol
- Songwriters: Ashley Frangipane; Dylan Bauld
- Producer: Dylan Bauld

Halsey singles chronology
"New Americana" (2015)	"Colors" (2016)	"Castle" (2016)

Music video
- ”Colors" on YouTube

"Colors" is a song by American singer and songwriter Halsey from her debut studio album, Badlands (2015). It was released on February 9, 2016, through Astralwerks as the album's third single. The song was made available as a 7-inch single and a five-track remix EP titled "Complementary Colors". As of September 2026, the song has reached over 534 million streams on Spotify.

== Background ==
An electropop song, "Colors" was written by Halsey and producer Dylan Bauld (also known as Dylan William). She stated during a performance at the Grammy Museum that she wrote most of the song, as a poem, at age 17, and later adapted it into a song two years later. She also stated it was one of her favorite songs that she wrote. Halsey expressed to Complex magazine; "[Blue is] just my creative color. It's like so many things at once. It's electric, and it's bright, but it's also calm. It's also ethereal. Blue is just an otherworldly color to me. Blue is the sky. Blue is the sea. Blue for me represents the unexplored territory". In another interview, she stated:

"My song 'Colors' is about being in a relationship with someone and kind of watching the vibrancy slowly start to leak out of them, watch the colors start to fade, whether they're falling victim to drugs or falling victim to work or any sort of negative behavior that's kind of taking them away from the bright and lively person that they used to be. You can kind of see them start to fade to gray, and you wish you had them back the way that they used to be".

On January 21, 2016, Halsey revealed the single's artwork via Twitter. The art had been painted on the side of a building located at the intersection of Franklin Street and Meserole Avenue in Williamsburg, Brooklyn. The picture features a black human silhouette standing in front of a dark green background. Lilac paint splashes around the head of the figure, which is a reference to the song's bridge. Upon its release, MTV's contributor Madeline Roth compared the reveal to the advertising campaign preceding Justin Bieber's album Purpose.

== Critical reception ==
Contemporary professional commentary that assesses the studio recording of "Colors" directly is limited. In a USA Today review of Badlands, Avery Stone singled out the track's hook-driven appeal, writing that "the pulsing chorus of "Colors" could almost — almost — fit in on Taylor Swift's 1989," situating it among the album's more accessible pop moments.

== Music video ==
A music video for the single was directed by Tim Mattia and released on February 25, 2016. Prior to its release, Halsey unveiled two teasers of the music video on her Twitter and Facebook account. She also announced that the video would premiere on February 25, 2016, and would co-star actor Tyler Posey.

The music video depicts Halsey as a high school student who is pursued by a classmate (played by Tyler Posey). Halsey and her mother engage in many activities with the classmate and his father (played by Victor Browne), including tennis and inviting the men over for dinner. Throughout the video, Halsey takes candid photos of her classmate in the tennis club locker room and in public and admires them in her room, but hides their existence from him. At the end of the music video, while trying to hide the photos in her locker, it is revealed that the photos are actually of the classmate's father, who Halsey has been harboring a crush on.

The video received a positive reception upon release, with critics mainly focusing on the video's plot twist. Nylon contrasted the song's "dreamy nature" with the video's roller coaster storyline.

The music video was filmed in Rosenheim Mansion and Westlake High School. As of June 2022, the music video has received over 250 million views on YouTube.

== Live performances ==
"Colors" was promoted by Halsey in a number of live appearances, including Jimmy Kimmel Live, Boston Calling Music Festival and at 02 Academy Islington, London. She also performed the song at the Billboard Women in Music 2016 event. In 2017, she performed the song at the ACLU benefit event.

== Track listing ==
- Digital EP – "Complementary Colors"
1. "Colors" (Stripped) – 4:26
2. "Colors" (Audien Remix) – 4:30
3. "Colors" (Sam Feldt Remix) – 4:46
4. "Colors" (Blonde Remix) – 4:58
5. "Colors" (Joel Fletcher & Nathan Thomson Remix) – 4:11
- Limited-edition 7-inch single

A. "Colors" – 4:09
B. "Colors" (Stripped) – 4:26

- Exclusive signed CD for "Camp Badlands" VIP Package
1. "Colors" (Radio Edit) – 3:30
2. "Colors" (Stripped) – 2:57
3. "Garden" (Demo) – 3:00

== Charts ==
Chart (2016)	Peak position
Australia (ARIA)	99
Czech Republic Airplay (ČNS IFPI)	24
Czech Republic Singles Digital (ČNS IFPI)	58
Slovakia Singles Digital (ČNS IFPI)	66
US Bubbling Under Hot 100 Singles (Billboard)	8
US Dance Club Songs (Billboard)	23
US Pop Airplay (Billboard)	38

== Certifications ==
Region	Certification	Certified units/sales
Australia (ARIA)	Gold	35,000^{‡}
Brazil (Pro-Música Brasil)	3× Platinum	180,000^{‡}
New Zealand (RMNZ)	Platinum	30,000^{‡}
Poland (ZPAV)	Platinum	50,000^{‡}
United Kingdom (BPI)	Gold	400,000^{‡}
United States (RIAA)	3× Platinum	3,000,000^{‡}
Streaming
Sweden (GLF)	Gold	4,000,000^{†}
^{‡} Sales+streaming figures based on certification alone.^{†} Streaming-only figures based on certification alone.

== Release history ==
Region	Date	Format	Label	Ref.
United States	February 9, 2016	Adult album alternative radio	Astralwerks; Capitol	
United States	February 29, 2016	Hot adult contemporary radio	Astralwerks; Capitol	
United States	March 1, 2016	Contemporary hit radio	Astralwerks; Capitol	
Various	April 22, 2016	Digital EP – "Complementary Colors"	Astralwerks	
United States	June 17, 2016	7-inch single	Astralwerks	
Various	June 24, 2016	7-inch single	Virgin EMI	
