= Young Rising Sons =

American indie pop band

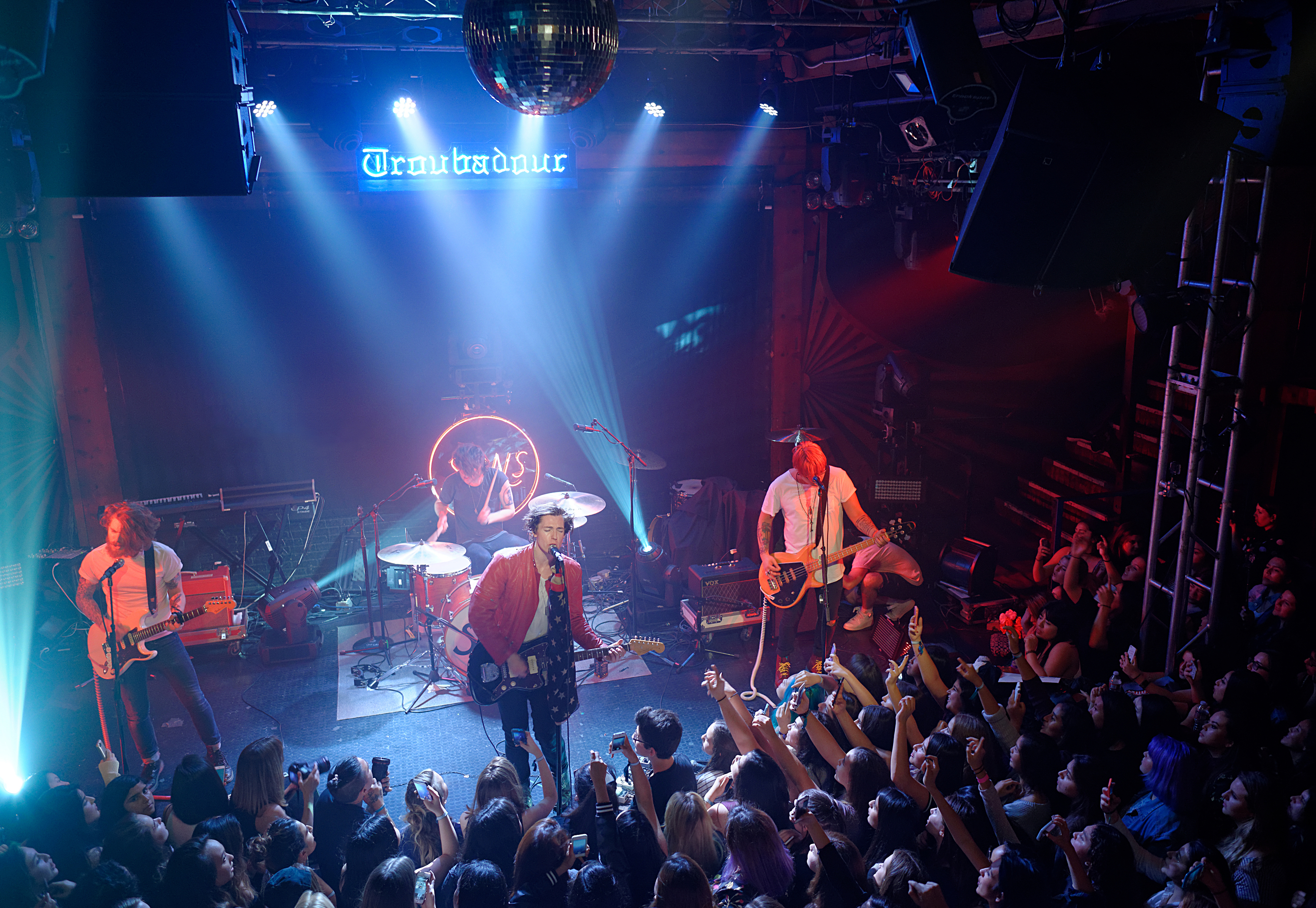
- Performing at the Troubadour in 2015

Background information
- Origin: Brooklyn, New York, United States
- Genres: Indie pop, pop rock, alternative rock
- Years active: 2010–present
- Labels: Dirty Canvas, Interscope
- Members: Andy Tongren; Julian Dimagiba; Max Iantorno; Steve Patrick
- Past members: Dylan Scott
- Website: www.youngrisingsons.net

Young Rising Sons are an American indie pop band consisting of Andy Tongren (lead singer/guitar), Julian Dimagiba (bass), Max Iantorno (guitar) and Steve Patrick (drums) formed in 2010. With the release of their debut single "High", Young Rising Sons signed with Dirty Canvas/Interscope Records in 2013.

BBC Radio 1 DJ, Zane Lowe named "High" a "Next Hype" track upon its release in the spring of 2014.

== Biography ==
=== 2010–2012: Band formation ===
Dimagiba and Patrick grew up playing music together in Red Bank, NJ. After watching Andy Tongren perform an acoustic set at a New York City bar, the other members approached him about taking lead vocals in their newly formed band. They wrote music together for several years under different aliases until eventually landing the name Young Rising Sons.

=== 2013–2016: The High and Interscope Signing ===
Through mutual friends of Andy Tongren, Young Rising Sons were introduced to New York producers Shep Goodman and Aaron Accetta. After hearing Tongren's soulful voice and witnessing the band's incredible chemistry, they immediately signed Young Rising Sons to a production deal with their label Dirty Canvas Music.

The band then went on to collaborate with Dirty Canvas Shep Goodman and Aaron Accetta as well as long time friends Christian Medice and James Adam Shelley to record new music which ultimately led to their debut single "High".

The video for "High" premiered on Mostly Junk Food and Buzznet. The response was explosive and quickly went viral hitting #1 on Hypem Twitter and landing on the main music page on YouTube. With the well received buzz, "High" instantly caught the attention of tastemakers across the globe including BBC Radio 1 DJ, Zane Lowe, who dubbed "High" his "Next Hype" track.

The band signed with Interscope Records in 2014. With this, Young Rising Sons released a self-titled four track EP through Dirty Canvas/Interscope Records.

Young Rising Sons spent 2014-2015 touring North America with such artists as Halsey, Weezer, Bleachers, Kongos, The 1975, and The Neighbourhood.

"High" was featured in the NHL Awards, MLB Network, Carson Daly, NBC Summer Image Campaign in 2014. The single was also featured on Fox's hit television show Red Band Society and ABC's Selfie in 2014

On Monday, May 2, 2016, the band officially announced via their social media outlets that Dylan Scott would be leaving the band to pursue other interests.

=== 2017-2021 ===
In 2017 Young Rising Sons announced their departure from Interscope Records. They went on to release singles, "Whiskey," and "Noise," followed by the "SAD / Scatterbrain" EP in 2018. The band announced in late fall of 2018 they would be taking a hiatus. On October 16, 2020, the band ended the hiatus and released a new single called "Halloween". They released another new single on December 11, 2020, titled "Sadder". And on January 29, 2021, Young Rising Sons released the single "Sunday Sunshine".

=== 2022-Present ===
In March 2022, Young Rising Sons self-released their first full-length album, Still Point In a Turning World.

== Discography ==
Young Rising Sons released their debut single "High" on July 22, 2014. The self-titled EP followed, officially released on July 22, 2014, by Dirty Canvas/Interscope Records.

The band released their latest single "Skeletons" on March 5, 2021.

=== Albums ===
Title	Album details
Still Point in a Turning World	Released: March 11, 2022; Label: Independent; Format: Digital download
YRS	Released: June 20, 2025; Label: Independent; Format: Digital download

=== Extended plays ===
Title	Album details
Young Rising Sons EP	Released: July 22, 2014; Label: Interscope Records, Dirty Canvas; Format: Digital download, 7" vinyl, CD
The High EP	Released: October 21, 2014; Label: Interscope Records, Dirty Canvas; Format: Digital download
The Kids Will Be Fine EP	Released: October 16, 2015; Label: Interscope Records, Dirty Canvas; Format: Digital download
Undefeatable +2	Released: October 21, 2016; Label: Interscope Records, Dirty Canvas; Format: Digital download
Swirl	Released: April 16, 2021; Label: Independent; Format: Digital download
Young	Released: January 23, 2023; Label: Independent; Format: Digital download
Suckers	Released: September 13, 2024; Label: Independent; Format: Digital download
Easy Listening	Released: October 16, 2024; Label: Independent; Format: Digital download
Sun In The Shower EP	Released: October 18, 2024; Label: Independent; Format: Digital download
Rising	Released: February 28, 2025; Label: Independent; Format: Digital download
Sons	Released: April 25, 2025; Label: Independent; Format: Digital download

=== Singles ===
Title	Album details
Carry On	Released: February 10, 2017; Label: Interscope Records, Dirty Canvas; Format: Digital download
Carry On (Acoustic)	Released: March 3, 2017; Label: Interscope Records, Dirty Canvas; Format: Digital download
Whiskey	Released: March 2, 2018; Label: Dirty Canvas; Format: Digital download
Whiskey (Acoustic)	Released: March 2, 2018; Label: Dirty Canvas; Format: Digital download
Noise	Released: May 4, 2018; Label: Dirty Canvas; Format: Digital download
SAD / Scatterbrain	Released: September 28, 2018; Label: Dirty Canvas; Format: Digital download
Halloween	Released: October 16, 2020; Label: Independent; Format: Digital download
Happy	Released: November 13, 2020; Label: Independent; Format: Digital download
Sadder	Released: December 11, 2020; Label: Independent; Format: Digital download
Sunday Sunshine	Released: January 29, 2021; Label: Independent; Format: Digital download
Skeletons	Released: March 5, 2021; Label: Independent; Format: Digital download
Outta My Head	Released: March 3, 2023; Label: Independent; Format: Digital download
Life's A Mess	Released: April 7, 2023; Label: Independent; Format: Digital download
Thank You	Released: June 16, 2023; Label: Independent; Format: Digital download
Like You	Released: July 28, 2023; Label: Independent; Format: Digital download
Tomorrow	Released: September 15, 2023; Label: Independent; Format: Digital download
I.C.D.R.N.	Released: October 20, 2023; Label: Independent; Format: Digital download
Peppermint Highway	Released: December 1, 2023; Label: Independent; Format: Digital download
Take Me Out	Released: January 19, 2024; Label: Independent; Format: Digital download
(Un)Happy Hour	Released: March 22, 2024; Label: Independent; Format: Digital download
Knockoff Elvis	Released: June 28, 2024; Label: Independent; Format: Digital download
