= Lido (musician) =

Norwegian musician, record producer

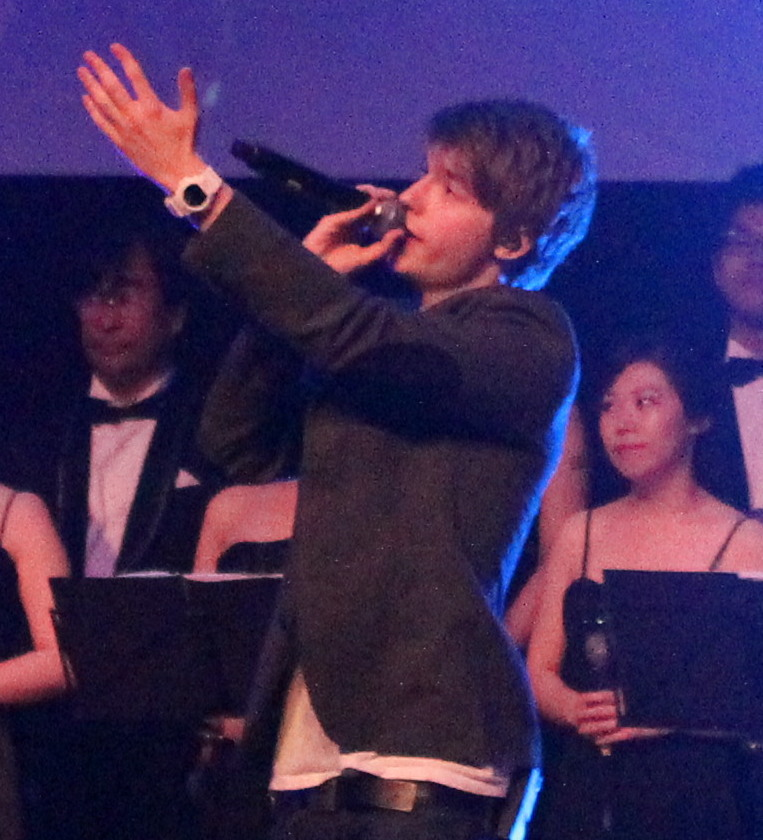
- Lido performing in 2012

Background information
- Also known as: LidoLido; Lil'P; Trippy Turtle
- Born: Peder Losnegård; 26 October 1992 (age 34); Tysvær Municipality, Norway
- Genres: Electronic; R&B; hip-hop; pop
- Occupations: Musician; record producer; singer; songwriter
- Instruments: Vocals; piano; drums; programming
- Years active: 2005–present
- Labels: Pelican Fly; Because Music; Caroline Music; Universal Music Norway
- Website: lidogotsongs.com

Peder Losnegård (born 26 October 1992), better known by his stage name Lido, is a Norwegian musician, record producer, singer, and songwriter. He produced "Same Drugs" and "Angels" on Chance the Rapper's Coloring Book. He is known for his extensive work with Halsey, executive producing her debut Badlands, as well as co-writing and producing several songs on Hopeless Fountain Kingdom and Manic. Lido has also notably produced for Ella Mai, Jaden Smith, Ariana Grande, Mariah Carey, ASAP Ferg, Smino, and Banks, among others.

== Career ==
Losnegård started as a drummer. He then began writing songs and playing the piano. He participated in Melodi Grand Prix Junior 2005, under the name Lil'P. This stage name was the origin of the name LidoLido. During the next five years, LidoLido gave out five free mixtapes online, including a trilogy: "Play Loud Music", "The Fresh Breath" and "The Good Guy Mixtape." He also released his first official single, "Go'n Be Gone", on the Fairplay Entertainment label. After the release, Losnegård appeared on NRK's Lydverket, and signed a record deal with Universal Music Norway.

Losnegård's first breakthrough single came in 2011: "Different", the year's most played song on NRK P3. On 3 February 2012, he released his debut album Pretty Girls & Grey Sweaters with Universal Music. At age 19, Losnegård won the Edvard prize in the popular music category with that album. Losnegård synthesized the entire album, with Little Steven, Jarle Bernhoft, Timbuktu, Yosef Wolde-Mariam and Ole Edvard Antonsen as guests. The album went platinum in Norway. For the album, he also received a Gramo scholarship and was awarded "Newcomer of the Year" at Spellemannprisen 2012. "Turn Up The Life", featuring Yosef Wolde-Mariam and Timbuktu, was played at the ceremony and became a hit. In 2013, he released Battle Poetry and opened for Beyonce at the Telenor Arena.

Losnegård focused on production during 2014 and 2015, executive producing Halsey's debut album, Badlands. He then signed a publishing deal with Sony/ATV and moved to Los Angeles. Lido's first album, Everything, was released through Because Music in October 2016. Since the debut of his album at Coachella and his single "Crazy", he worked as executive producer with Rick Rubin on Towkio's debut studio album, WWW. Lido later played with Towkio on the Tonight Show with Jimmy Fallon. He played international festivals in 2016, including at Splendour In The Grass.

He also mashed Kanye West and Kid Cudi's Kids See Ghosts into a seven-minute track titled "Kid's Love Ghosts", after doing a similar feat with the entirety of West's The Life of Pablo two years earlier, that time with an eight-minute track. Chance the Rapper's 2016 mixtape Coloring Book, which Lido produced on, won two Grammy Awards for "Best Rap Artist" and "Best New Performance" in 2017.

In 2018, Lido signed a publishing deal with Rick Rubin's American Recordings under Pulse Music Group, producing five tracks for Chance the Rapper and collaborating with Skrillex on Mariah Carey and Ty Dolla Sign's "The Distance". Lido signed a deal with Warner Records as an A&R at the company. He released a series of EPs and singles, including the singles "3 Million" and his collaboration with Norwegian RnB artist Unge Ferrari, "Corner Love", both in 2018. Lido performed "Corner Love" on National Norwegian TV's Lindmo. Lido accompanied the "I O U" EP series with a short film with a limited theater release across North America.

Losnegård was also involved in production of music for the 2019 anime Carole & Tuesday. He composed the song "Move Mountains" and "Not Afraid", which are sung by Alisa as the singing voice of the character Angela. "Not Afraid" is used as the anime's ending song starting from episode 13.

== Discography ==
- Pretty Girls & Grey Sweaters (2012)
- Battle Poetry (2013)
- I Love You (2014)
- The Passion Project (2015)
- Everything (2016)
- The Passion Project II (2017)
- Spacesuit (2018)
- I O U 1 (2018)
- I O U 2 (2018)
- Peder (2020)
- Ultraviolet (2023)

== Awards and nominations ==
Year	Organization	Award	Recipient	Result
2012	Spellemannprisen '11	Årets Nykommer & Gramostipend (Newcomer of the Year & Gramo scholarship)	Lido	Won
2017	Spellemannprisen '16	Urban	Lido	Nominated

Awards
Preceded by Jonas Alaska	Recipient of the Newcomer Spellemannprisen; 2012	Succeeded by Monica Heldal
