= Austin Mahone discography =

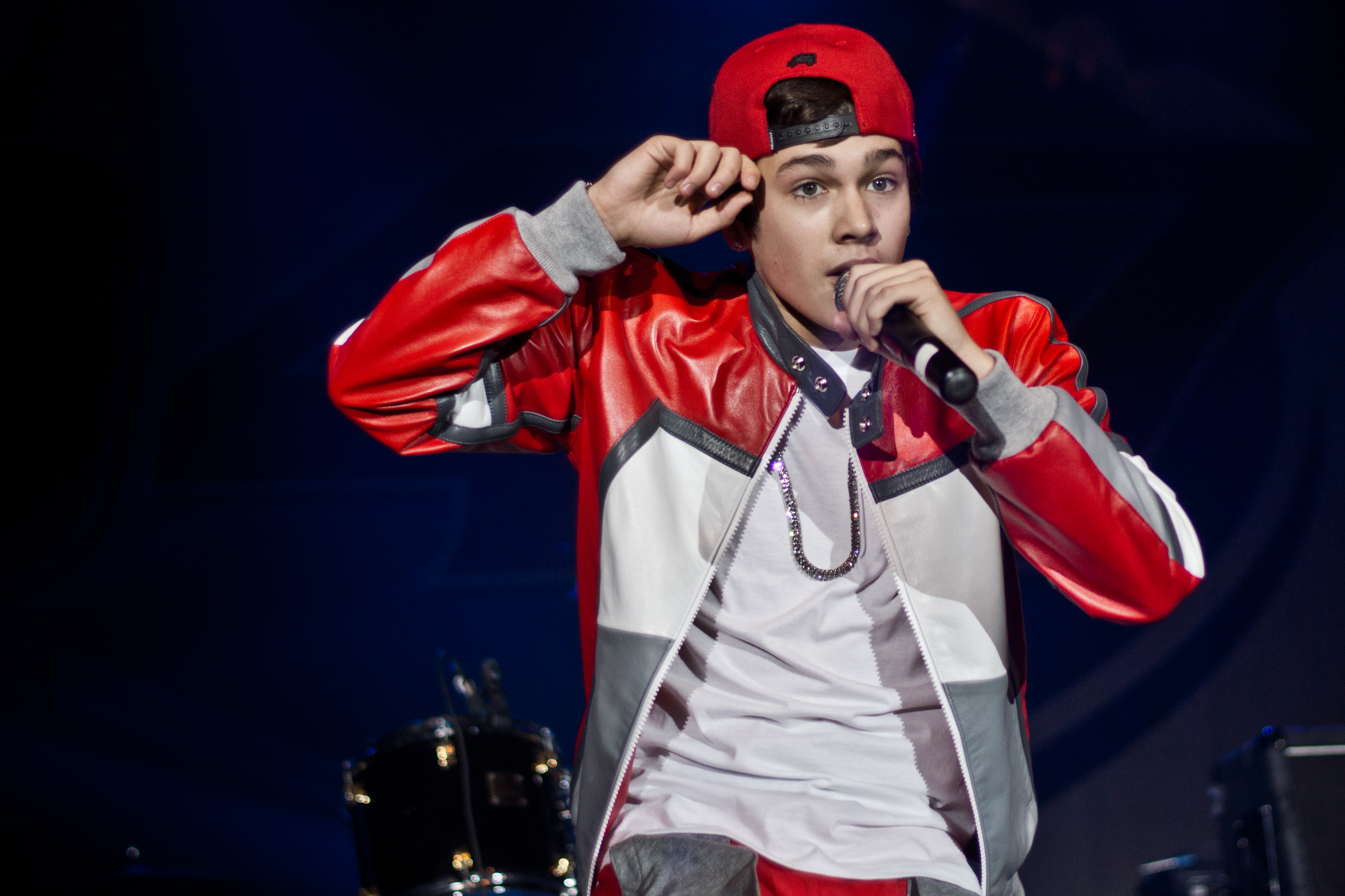
- Mahone performing for K104.7's Not So Silent Night in 2012.
- Studio albums: 2
- EPs: 5
- Singles: 26
- Music videos: 36
- Promotional singles: 26
- Mixtapes: 2

The discography of Austin Mahone, an American singer-songwriter, consists of two studio albums, two mixtapes, five extended plays, twenty three singles, twenty six promotional singles, and thirty-six music videos. Mahone independently released his debut single, "11:11" to iTunes on February 14, 2012. On May 29, 2013, he released his debut EP, Extended Play, in Japan only. On June 5, 2012, Mahone independently released his second single, "Say Somethin", his first release under the management of Chase Entertainment. On August 28, 2012, Mahone announced that he had been signed to Chase/Universal Republic Records.

"Mmm Yeah" was released as the lead single from Mahone's second EP, titled The Secret, released on January 26, 2014. The Secret was released on May 27, 2014. Mahone later released music videos for promotional singles "All I Ever Need", "Shadow" and "Secret", though no further official singles were released from the EP. Over the course of 2014 and 2015, he continued to independently release new music for his fans. Five new songs titled "Say My Name", "Places", "Waiting for This Love", "Someone Like You" and "Torture" were released for free download through his official SoundCloud page.

On July 1, 2015, Mahone released the lead single from his debut studio album, "Dirty Work". His debut studio album, Dirty Work – The Album was released exclusively in Japan on October 18, 2017.

As of June 2014, Mahone has sold a total of 2.3 million digital songs.

Mahone's second studio album was released on June 23, 2023, under the title A Lone Star Story. As of June 2023, three singles have preceded the album's release: "Sundress", "Withdrawal" and "Kuntry".

== Albums ==
=== Studio albums ===
List of studio albums, with selected chart positions
Title	Details	Peak chart positions
Title	Details	JPN
Dirty Work – The Album	Released: October 18, 2017 (Japan); Label: A.M. Music, Mr. 305; Formats: CD, digital download	34
A Lone Star Story	Released: June 23, 2023; Label: A.M. Music; Formats: Digital download, streaming	—
"—" denotes releases that did not chart or were not released in that territory.

=== Mixtapes ===
List of mixtapes, with selected chart positions
Title	Details	Peak chart positions	
Title	Details	US Ind.	US Cur.
This Is Not the Album	Released: December 17, 2015; Label: A.M. Music; Format: Digital download, streaming	—	—
ForMe+You	Released: December 30, 2016; Label: A.M. Music; Format: Digital download, streaming	12	93
"—" denotes releases that did not chart or were not released in that territory.

== Extended plays ==
List of extended plays, with selected chart positions, sales figures and certifications
Title	Details	Peak chart positions										Sales	Certifications
Title	Details	US	AUS	BEL (Fl)	CAN	DEN	ITA	JPN	MEX	NOR	SPA	Sales	Certifications
Extended Play	Released: May 29, 2013 (Japan); Label: Chase, Republic; Formats: CD, digital download	—	—	—	—	—	—	17	—	—	—		
The Secret	Released: May 23, 2014; Label: Cash Money, Chase, Republic; Formats: CD, digital download	5	74	60	11	18	12	49	26	11	27	US: 100,000	AMPROFON: Gold
Dirty Work	Released: April 14, 2017; Label: A.M. Music, Mr. 305; Formats: CD, Digital download	—	—	—	—	—	—	—	—	—	—		
Oxygen	Released: May 16, 2018; Label: A.M. Music; Formats: Digital download, streaming	—	—	—	—	—	—	— (Note: Oxygen did not enter the Billboard Japan Hot Albums chart, but peaked at number 93 on the Top Download Albums chart.)	—	—	—		
Magic City	Released: June 23, 2021; Label: A.M. Music; Formats: Streaming	—	—	—	—	—	—	—	—	—	—		
"—" denotes releases that did not chart or were not released in that territory.

== Singles ==
=== As lead artist ===
List of singles, with selected chart positions and certifications
Title	Year	Peak chart positions										Sales	Certifications	Album
Title	Year	US	AUS	AUT	BEL	CAN	JPN	MEX	NLD	SPA	UK	Sales	Certifications	Album
"Say Somethin"	2012	—	—	—	—	—	—	—	—	—	—		RIAA: Gold	Extended Play
"Say You're Just a Friend" (featuring Flo Rida)	2012	— (Note: "Say You're Just a Friend" did not enter the Billboard Hot 100, but peaked at number 4 on the Bubbling Under Hot 100 chart.)	—	—	— (Note: "Say You're Just a Friend" did not enter the Ultratop 50, but peaked at number two on the Ultratip chart.)	—	12	—	—	—	—		RIAA: Gold	Extended Play
"What About Love"	2013	66	—	—	— (Note: "What About Love" did not enter the Ultratop 50, but peaked at number seven on the Ultratip chart.)	67	— (Note: "What About Love" did not enter the Japan Hot 100, but peaked at number seven on the Japan Dance Hits 20 chart.)	20	44	—	83	US: 374,000	RIAA: Gold	The Secret
"Banga! Banga!"	2013	—	—	—	—	—	—	—	—	—	—			Non-album single
"Mmm Yeah" (featuring Pitbull)	2014	49	32	57	— (Note: "Mmm Yeah" did not enter the Ultratop 50, but peaked at number 28 on the Ultratip chart.)	36	— (Note: "Mmm Yeah" did not enter the Japan Hot 100, but peaked at number 86 on the Japan Hot 100 Airplay chart.)	— (Note: "Mmm Yeah" did not enter the Mexico Airplay chart, but peaked at number 26 on the Mexico Ingles Airplay chart.)	48	35	34	US: 193,000	RIAA: Platinum; ARIA: Gold; IFPI DEN: Platinum	The Secret
"Dirty Work"	2015	—	—	—	—	—	4	— (Note: "Dirty Work" did not enter the Mexico Airplay chart, but peaked at number 30 on the Mexico Ingles Airplay chart.)	—	—	—		RIAJ: Platinum	Dirty Work
"Lady" (featuring Pitbull)	2017	—	—	—	—	—	— (Note: "Lady" did not enter the Japan Hot 100, but peaked at number 15 on the Japan Dance Hits 20 chart.)	—	—	—	—			Dirty Work
"Creatures of the Night" (with Hardwell)	2017	—	—	—	— (Note: "Creatures of the Night" did not enter the Ultratop 50, but charted as an "extra tip" on the Ultratip chart.)	—	— (Note: "Creatures of the Night" did not enter the Japan Hot 100, but peaked at number five on the Japan Dance Hits 20 chart.)	—	99	—	—	US: 2,000		Dirty Work
"Say Hi" (with Codeko)	2017	—	—	—	—	—	—	—	—	—	—			Oxygen
"Háblame Bajito" (with Abraham Mateo and 50 Cent)	2017	—	—	—	—	—	—	—	—	57	—		RIAA: Platinum (Latin); AMPROFON: Platinum	A Cámara Lenta
"So Good"	2018	—	—	—	—	—	21	—	—	—	—			Oxygen
"Why Don't We"	2019	—	—	—	—	—	—	—	—	—	—			Non-album singles
"Anxious"	2019	—	—	—	—	—	—	—	—	—	—			Non-album singles
"Dancing with Nobody"	2019	—	—	—	—	—	—	— (Note: "Dancing with Nobody" did not enter the Mexico Airplay chart, but peaked at number 17 on the Mexico Ingles Airplay chart.)	—	—	—			Non-album singles
"Summer Love"	2020	—	—	—	—	—	—	—	—	—	—			Non-album singles
"You Got Me" (featuring Frut)	2020	—	—	—	—	—	—	—	—	—	—			Non-album singles
"Miami" (with Mario Bautista & Lalo Ebratt)	2020	—	—	—	—	—	—	31	—	—	—			Non-album singles
"Tied Up" (with Rock Mafia)	2021	—	—	—	—	—	—	—	—	—	—			Non-album singles
"My Section" (with Tomoro)	2022	—	—	—	—	—	—	—	—	—	—			Non-album singles
"Sundress"	2022	—	—	—	—	—	—	—	—	—	—			A Lone Star Story
"No Limits" (with Fueled by 808 and Kid Rock featuring Jimmie Allen)	2023	—	—	—	—	—	—	—	—	—	—			Non-album single
"Withdrawal"	2023	—	—	—	—	—	—	—	—	—	—			A Lone Star Story
"Kuntry"	2023	—	—	—	—	—	—	—	—	—	—			A Lone Star Story
"Cruise"	2023	—	—	—	—	—	—	—	—	—	—			A Lone Star Story
"Sooner or Later"	2024	—	—	—	—	—	—	—	—	—	—			TBA
"Rearview"	2025	—	—	—	—	—	—	—	—	—	—			TBA
"Both Ways"	2025	—	—	—	—	—	—	—	—	—	—			TBA
"It's Summer" (with Chris Daniel)	2025	—	—	—	—	—	—	—	—	—	—			TBA
"—" denotes releases that did not chart or were not released in that territory.

=== As a featured artist ===
List of singles as featured artist, showing year released and album name
Title	Year	Album
"Joy Ride" (Bobby Brackins featuring Austin Mahone)	2016	To Live For
"Deserve Better" (Jump Smokers featuring Austin Mahone)	2016	Non-album singles
"Bad Boyz" (Mr. Mauricio featuring Austin Mahone, Pitbull and Bobby Biscayne)	2017	Non-album singles
"Amor" (Remix) (I Am Chino featuring Chacal, Wisin and Austin Mahone)	2017	Non-album singles
"Lucid" (4B featuring Austin Mahone & Abraham Mateo)	2020	Non-album singles

=== Promotional singles ===
List of promotional singles, with selected chart positions, sales and certifications
Title	Year	Peak chart positions					Sales	Certifications	Album
Title	Year	US	US Pop Dig.	JPN	KOR	UK Indie Break	Sales	Certifications	Album
"11:11"	2012	— (Note: "11:11" did not enter the Billboard Hot 100, but peaked at number 16 on the Bubbling Under Hot 100 Singles chart.)	47	—	—	19	WW: 100,000		Extended Play
"Heart in My Hand"	2013	—	34	—	144	—			Extended Play
"U"	2014	— (Note: "U" did not enter the Billboard Hot 100, but peaked at number 19 on the Bubbling Under Hot 100 Singles chart.)	27	—	—	—			The Secret
"Till I Find You"	2014	— (Note: "Till I Find You" did not enter the Billboard Hot 100, but peaked at number 24 on the Bubbling Under Hot 100 Singles chart.)	28	29	—	—	—		The Secret
"All I Ever Need"	2014	— (Note: "All I Ever Need" did not enter the Billboard Hot 100, but peaked at number 20 on the Bubbling Under Hot 100 Singles chart.)	27	—	—	—		RIAA: Gold; RMNZ: Gold	The Secret
"Shadow"	2014	— (Note: "Shadow" did not enter the Billboard Hot 100, but peaked at number 14 on the Bubbling Under Hot 100 Singles and at number one on the Billboard Twitter Real-Time chart.)	—	—	—	—	—		The Secret
"Say My Name"	2014	—	—	—	—	—			Non-album singles
"Shawty Shawty" (featuring Bei Maejor)	2014	—	—	—	—	—			Non-album singles
"Secret"	2014	—	—	—	—	—			The Secret
"Places"	2014	—	—	—	—	—			Non-album singles
"Waiting For This Love"	2014	—	—	—	—	—			Non-album singles
"Someone Like You"	2015	—	—	—	—	—			Non-album singles
"Torture"	2015	—	—	—	—	—			Non-album singles
"Do It Right" (featuring Rob Villa)	2015	—	—	—	—	—			This Is Not The Album
"On Your Way" (featuring KYLE)	2015	—	—	—	—	—			This Is Not The Album
"Not Far"	2015	—	—	—	—	—			This Is Not The Album
"Put It On Me" (featuring Sage the Gemini)	2015	—	—	—	—	—			This Is Not The Album
"Send It" (featuring Rich Homie Quan)	2016	—	—	—	—	—			Non-album singles
"Way Up"	2016	—	—	—	—	—			Non-album singles
"Perfect Beauty" (featuring Bobby Biscayne)	2017	—	—	73	—	—			Dirty Work – The Album
"I Don't Believe You"	2017	—	—	—	—	—			Dirty Work – The Album
"Found You"	2017	—	—	—	—	—			Dirty Work – The Album
"Silent Night"	2017	—	—	—	—	—			Non-album singles
"One Time"	2021	—	—	—	—	—			Non-album singles
"Get Gone"	2021	—	—	—	—	—			Non-album singles
"Unladylike"	2022	—	—	—	—	—			Non-album singles
"—" denotes releases that did not chart or were not released in that territory.

== Other appearances ==
Title	Year	Other artist(s)	Album
"Magik 2.0"	2013	Becky G	The Smurfs 2
"Dedicated"	2017	Pitbull and R. Kelly	Climate Change

== Music videos ==
List of music videos, showing year released and directors
Title	Year	Director(s)	Ref.
As lead artist
"Say Somethin"	2012	Evan Dennis	
"Say You're Just a Friend" (featuring Flo Rida)	2013	Ray Kay	
"Heart in My Hand"	2013	Alex Zamm	
"What About Love"	2013	Colin Tilley	
"Banga! Banga!"	2013	Gil Green	
"Mmm Yeah" (Lyric video) (featuring Pitbull)	2014	Rocco Valdes; Dan Roof; Tomás Whitmore	
"U"	2014	Unknown	
"Mmm Yeah" (featuring Pitbull)	2014	Gil Green	
"All I Ever Need"	2014	Eric Guerrero	
"Shadow"	2014	Charlotte Knight	
"Secret"	2014	Eric Guerrero	
"Dirty Work"	2015	Gil Green; Kenny Kool-Aid	
"Dirty Work" (Dance version)	2015	Gil Green; Kenny Kool-Aid	
"Put It on Me" (featuring Sage the Gemini)	2016	Gil Green	
"Send It" (Lyric video) (featuring Rich Homie Quan)	2016	Y2K	
"Way Up" (Lyric video)	2016	Y2K	
"Lady" (Lyric video) (featuring Pitbull)	2017	Unknown	
"Lady" (featuring Pitbull)	2017	Gil Green	
"Perfect Beauty" (featuring Bobby Biscayne)	2017	GOODBOYSHADY	
"Why Don't We"	2019	Arran	
"Anxious"	2019	Unknown	
"Dancing with Nobody"	2019	Unknown	
"Summer Love"	2020	Unknown	
"You Got Me" (featuring Frut)	2020	Unknown	
"Miami" (with Mario Bautista and Lalo Ebratt)	2020	The Broducers	
"One Time" (Visualizer)	2021	Unknown	
"Get Gone" (Visualizer)	2021	Unknown	
"My Section" (with TOMORO)	2022	Unknown	
"Sundress"	2022	Unknown	
"Withdrawal"	2023	Unknown	
"Kuntry"	2023	No Love Out West and Austin Mahone	
"Cruise"	2023	No Love Out West and Austin Mahone	
Guest appearances
"Fill Me In" (Pia Mia featuring Austin Mahone)	2015	Unknown	
"Joy Ride" (Bobby Brackins featuring Austin Mahone)	2016	Damien Sandoval	
"Háblame Bajito" (Abraham Mateo featuring 50 Cent & Austin Mahone)	2017	Mike Ho	
"Lucid" (4B featuring Austin Mahone & Abraham Mateo)	2020	Unknown	
