= Dirty Work =

Dirty Work may refer to:

== Films and television ==
- Dirty Work (1933 film), an American comedy short starring comic duo Laurel and Hardy
- Dirty Work (1934 film), a British comedy film
- Dirty Work, a 1992 made for TV crime film starring John Ashton
- Dirty Work (1998 film), an American comedy film starring Norm Macdonald and Artie Lange
- Dirty Work (TV series), a 2012 television series

== Music ==
=== Albums ===
- Dirty Work (Rolling Stones album), 1986
- Dirty Work (All Time Low album), 2011
- Dirty Work – The Album, a 2017 album by Austin Mahone
- Dirty Work (single album), a 2025 single album by Aespa, or its title track
- Derty Werk, an album by T.W.D.Y., 1999

=== Songs ===
- "Dirty Work" (Steely Dan song), 1972
- "Dirty Work" (Austin Mahone song), 2015
- "Dirty Work", by Caroline's Spine from the album Overlooked, 2002
- "Dirty Work", by Halestorm from the album Halestorm, 2009

== Books ==
- Dirty Work (Cox novel), a 1987 novel by Nigel Cox
- Dirty Work (Brown novel), a 1989 novel by Larry Brown
- Dirty Work, a 1993 novel by Dan McGirt
- Dirty Work, a 2003 novel by Stuart Woods
- Dirty Work (Hager book), a 2026 book by journalist Nicky Hager

== Play ==
- Dirty Work (play), farce by Ben Travers, produced in 1932 at the Aldwych Theatre, London

== Other ==
- Dirty work, another name for chore division, a part of the theory of fair division
- Dirty Work, a story from The Railway Series' book "Duck and the Diesel Engine"
