= List of awards and nominations received by Austin Mahone =

Austin Mahone awards and nominations
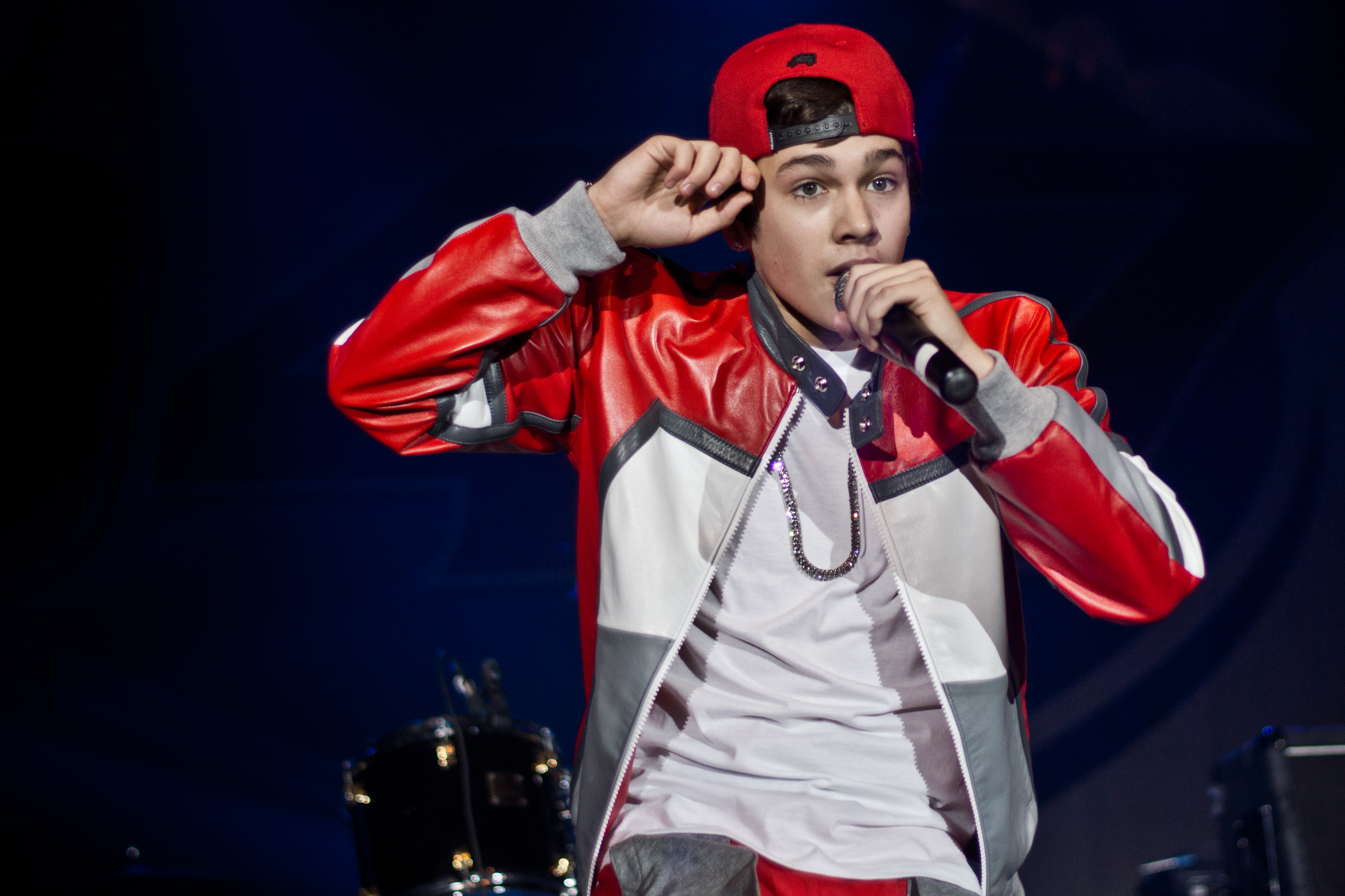
- Mahone in 2012
Awards and nominations
Award	Wins	Nominations
MTV Video Music Awards	1	2
MTV Europe Music Awards	2	2
Teen Choice Awards	1	2

Totals (Note: Certain award groups do not simply award one winner. They acknowledge several different recipients, have runners-up, and have third place. Since this is a specific recognition and is different from losing an award, runner-up mentions are considered wins in this award tally. For simplification and to avoid errors, each award in this list has been presumed to have had a prior nomination.)
- Wins: 8
- Nominations: 36

Austin Mahone is an American singer and songwriter. He has won eight awards, including Artist to Watch at the 2013 MTV Video Music Awards.

== Bravo Otto ==
Year	Category	Work	Result	Ref.
2013	Breakout Artist	Austin Mahone	Nominated	
2014	Artist of the Year	Austin Mahone	Nominated	

== BreakTudo Awards ==
Year	Category	Work	Result	Ref.
2019	International Performance in Brazil	Pocket Show Mix	Won	

== iHeartRadio Music Awards ==
Year	Category	Work	Result	Ref.
2014	Best Fan Army	Austin Mahone	Nominated	
2014	Instagram award	Austin Mahone	Won	

== Kids' Choice Awards ==
=== Argentina Kids' Choice Awards ===
Year	Category	Work	Result	Ref.
2014	International Artist	Austin Mahone	Nominated	

=== Meus Prêmios Nick ===
Year	Category	Work	Result	Ref.
2014	Favourite Fan Family	Mahomies	Nominated	

=== Mexico Kids' Choice Awards ===
Year	Category	Work	Result	Ref.
2014	Favourite Fan Family	Mahomies	Nominated	

=== UK Kids' Choice Awards ===
Year	Category	Work	Result
2014	Favourite Fan Family	Mahomies	Nominated

== MTV Awards ==
=== MTV Video Music Awards ===
Year	Category	Work	Result	Ref.
2013	Artist to Watch	"What About Love"	Won	
2014	Best Lyric Video	"Mmm Yeah" (ft Pitbull)	Nominated	

=== MTV Europe Music Awards ===
Year	Category	Work	Result
2013	Best Push	Austin Mahone	Won
2013	Artist On Rise	Austin Mahone	Won

== Neox Fan Awards ==
Year	Category	Work	Result	Ref.
2014	Artist to Watch	Austin Mahone	Nominated	
2014	Best New Act	Austin Mahone	Nominated	

== People's Choice Awards ==
Year	Category	Work	Result	Ref.
2014	Favorite Breakout Artist	Austin Mahone	Nominated	

== Premios Juventud ==
Year	Category	Work	Result	Ref.
2014	Favorite Hitmaker	Austin Mahone	Nominated	
2014	The Best Dressed Award	Austin Mahone	Won	
2015	Favorite Hitmaker	Austin Mahone	Nominated	

== Radio Disney Music Awards ==
Year	Category	Work	Result	Ref.
2013	Best Crush Song	"Say You're Just a Friend" (ft Flo Rida)	Nominated	
2013	Best Acoustic Performance	"Say Somethin"	Nominated	
2013	Breakout Star	Austin Mahone	Won	
2013	Fiercest Fans	Mahomies	Nominated	
2014	Best Male Artist	Austin Mahone	Nominated	
2014	Most Talked About Artist	Austin Mahone	Nominated	
2014	Artist with the Best Style	Austin Mahone	Nominated	
2014	Best Crush Song	"What About Love"	Nominated	

== Teen Choice Awards ==
Year	Category	Work	Result	Ref.
2014	Choice Music Breakout Artist	Himself	Won	
2014	Choice Male Artist	Himself	Nominated	
2014	Choice Male Hottie	Himself	Nominated	
2014	Choice Smile	Himself	Nominated	
2014	Choice Single Male Artist	"Mmm Yeah" (ft Pitbull)	Nominated	
2015	Choice Male Hottie	Austin Mahone	Nominated	
2016	Choice Male Hottie	Austin Mahone	Nominated	

== Young Hollywood Awards ==
Year	Category	Work	Result	Ref.
2013	Breakout Artist	Himself	Won	
2014	Social Media Superstar	Himself	Nominated	
