= Y2K pop =

Turn-of-the-millennium style of pop music

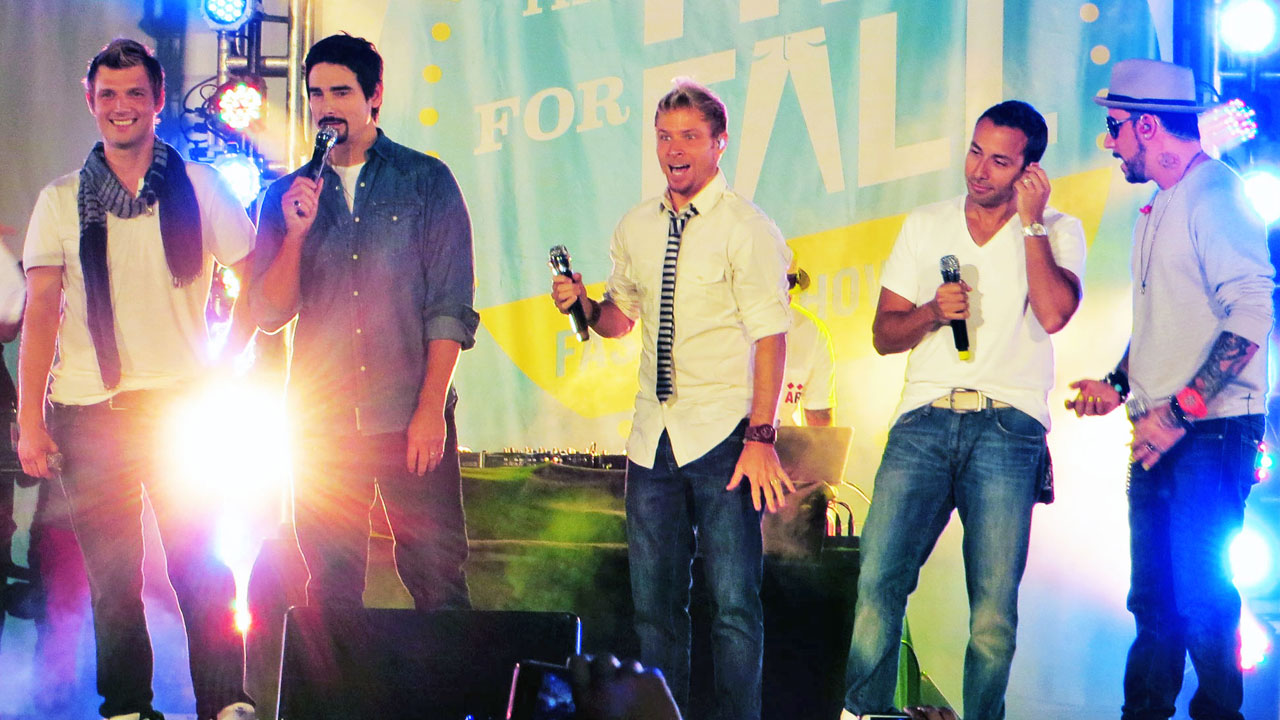
The Backstreet Boys were among the most prominent acts associated with the Cheiron sound and turn-of-the-millennium teen pop.

Y2K pop is associated with the turn-of-the-millennium era of pop music, particularly the late-1990s and early-2000s teen pop boom. A prominent part of this period was the Cheiron sound, a style of pop production associated with Cheiron Studios in Stockholm, Sweden. The Cheiron sound associated with Y2K pop was characterised by highly polished, layered production.

Contemporary descriptions of Y2K pop culture have also emphasised its strong connection between music and visual presentation, including elaborate choreography and futuristic music videos. During the latter half of the 1990s, the Cheiron sound became a prominent part of the emerging Y2K pop era, particularly through the international teen pop boom and Cheiron's work with the Backstreet Boys, NSYNC, Five, Robyn and Britney Spears.

== Musical characteristics ==
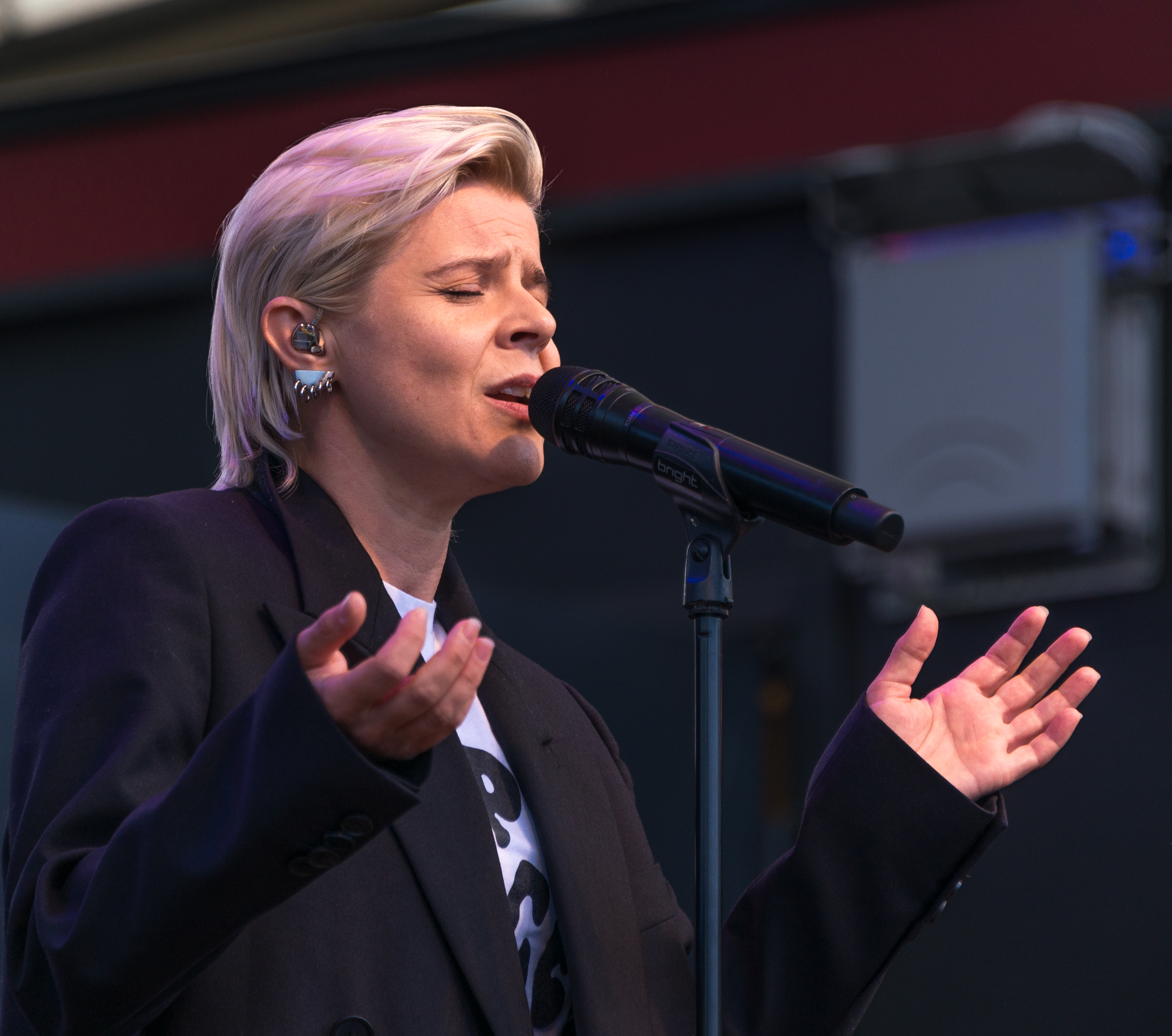
Robyn was an early example of the Cheiron sound, particularly through her work with Max Martin in the 1990s.

Melody and prominent choruses were central to the Cheiron style that became associated with the Y2K pop era. The "Cheiron sound", which became characteristic of Y2K-era pop music, was described by The Guardian as melodic, hymnal, but hard-edged, catchy, highly hook-driven and dramatic, combining technical accuracy with a characteristically Swedish "happy/sad" quality comparable to ABBA. Other descriptions of the studio's output have noted its blend of R&B grooves with Swedish pop melodies and large, major-chord choruses. The Cheiron sound associated with the Y2K pop era was also characterised by a bouncing, piano- and synthesizer-heavy production style that combined elements of Europop and Italian house with classic American pop arrangements.

Economic geographer Ola Johansson describes the Cheiron sound as a recognisable and somewhat formulaic production style, shaped by the repeated use of similar sounds during the Y2K pop era. Early examples included Robyn's work with Max Martin, characterised by large synthesizer chords, while the Backstreet Boys further defined the sound before it was adapted for other Cheiron artists such as NSYNC and Britney Spears. The sound also drew influence from 1980s hard rock, particularly in its large, emphatic choruses. Johansson compares this aspect of the Cheiron sound to bands such as Def Leppard, Scorpions, Van Halen and Europe, attributing the influence partly to Max Martin and other Swedish writer-producers who had backgrounds in hard rock before adapting elements of the style to pop music. Ballads such as the Backstreet Boys' "I Want It That Way" also demonstrated a recurring Cheiron arrangement in which the instrumentation was reduced during a bridge before returning to a larger final chorus, sometimes accompanied by a key change.

The minor key was present in many prominent Cheiron productions during the Y2K pop era. For example, Britney Spears' "...Baby One More Time" was written in C minor, which shifted between the natural and harmonic minor scales. Various theories were proposed about Max Martin's songwriting methods, including the concept of "melodic maths", in which a chorus is introduced within the first 50 seconds and songs are constructed from a limited number of sections. Martin has described his approach as relying on balance between melody and harmony; when chord progressions change considerably throughout a song, he has said that the melodic structure should remain relatively consistent. He has also discussed varying the energy between successive choruses as a way of maintaining the listener's attention.

== Style and production ==
Futuristic and space-age imagery was a recurring feature of the visual aesthetic associated with Y2K pop.

The late 1990s and early 2000s encompassed a range of popular styles, including teen pop, R&B-pop, dance-pop and pop-punk, with prominent hooks, vocal harmonies and sing-along choruses recurring across many of its commercially successful songs. In a 2000 interview with Time, Max Martin described the studio's approach as "direct, effective, we don't show off", while the magazine noted the extensive mixing and layering of vocals and instrumentation used by Martin and Rami Yacoub. Martin's productions frequently employed dense synthesizer arrangements, rhythmic R&B and dance-pop elements, layered vocals and strongly defined transitions between verses and choruses. His production style also made frequent use of layered vocals, drum machines, keyboards and gospel-influenced middle eights.

According to music producer Rami Yacoub, Cheiron Studios made extensive use of Roland JV-1080 and JV-2080 synthesizers, with several units used simultaneously. Yacoub had attributed part of Cheiron's recognisable sound to the limitations of the equipment and sound libraries available at the time. Producers often worked with and modified a relatively restricted collection of synthesizer sounds, pads, stabs and samples rather than having access to the much larger digital sound libraries available afterwards.

Other artists associated with the Y2K era of pop have included Blue, Ricky Martin, A1, Westlife, Marc Anthony, Celine Dion, LFO, Christina Aguilera, Beyoncé and Destiny's Child, TLC, Spice Girls, 98 Degrees, Mariah Carey, Jessica Simpson, Mandy Moore, Nelly Furtado, Hilary Duff, Jessica Folcker, Jennifer Lopez, Solid HarmoniE, Ace Of Base, 3T and Ashanti. Australian acts associated with the turn-of-the-millennium Popstars boom included Bardot, formed during the first Australian series in 2000, and Scandal'us, formed during the second series in 2001. Furthermore, music videos cited as representative of the era include Britney Spears' "Oops!... I Did It Again", Jennifer Lopez's "Waiting for Tonight" and Madonna's "Music". Early-2000s pop music videos generally adopted a futuristic visual style, characterised by lasers, metallic décor and futuristic or outer-space settings.

== Influence and legacy ==
Britney Spears, one of the most prominent artists associated with Y2K pop.

Martin's production of Robyn's "Show Me Love" (1997), built around an electro-funk rhythm and large synthesizer chords, has been identified as an important development of the sound that subsequently became prominent in late-1990s pop. Britney Spears' debut single "...Baby One More Time", written and co-produced by Martin and recorded at Cheiron, became one of the studio's most commercially successful productions. New Musical Express stated upon the studio's closure in 2000 that Cheiron's production techniques had "reinvented the sound of late-'90s pop", citing its work with Spears, the Backstreet Boys, NSYNC and Five. The studio's influence still continued after its closure. Billboard has credited NSYNC's 2000 album No Strings Attached with having "shook up the sound of Y2K pop". The Independent credited Martin with helping to define Y2K pop through songs such as Britney Spears' "...Baby One More Time" and the Backstreet Boys' "I Want It That Way".

Elements of the sound have also been identified in later pop music. Austin Mahone's 2013 single "What About Love" was described by MTV as drawing from the 1990s boy-band sound, with a style reminiscent of the Backstreet Boys and NSYNC. Mahone described the song as combining an "old school" influence with contemporary electronic dance music. Similarly, Meghan Trainor's 2016 single "No" was compared by Spin to the turn-of-the-millennium pop of Britney Spears and NSYNC, particularly for its melody and guitar squeals. Moreover, the style has seen renewed interest during the 2020s, with newer acts such as After drawing on the sound and aesthetics of early-2000s pop. In its review of pop music trends of 2022, the Recording Academy noted a wider revival of late-1990s and early-2000s culture and highlighted the return of Y2K-era pop artists including Britney Spears, Christina Aguilera and Mandy Moore. In 2025, the Backstreet Boys released a new version of the music video for "I Want It That Way", recreating scenes from the original 1999 video more than 25 years after its release.

== See also ==
- Y2K aesthetic
