= So Good =

So Good may refer to:

== Albums ==
- So Good (Mica Paris album) or the title song, 1988
- So Good (The Whispers album) or the title song, 1984
- So Good (Zara Larsson album) or the title song (see below), 2017
- So Good (T-ara EP), 2015
- So Good (Junho EP), 2015
- So Good: 12" Club Collection, by Brenda K. Starr, 2004

== Songs ==
- "So Good" (B.o.B song), 2012
- "So Good" (Boyzone song), 1995
- "So Good" (Davina song), 1997
- "So Good" (Dove Cameron song), 2019
- "So Good" (Electrik Red song), 2009
- "So Good" (Eternal song), 1994
- "So Good" (Halsey song), 2022
- "So Good" (Louisa Johnson song), 2016
- "So Good" (Rachel Stevens song), 2005
- "So Good" (Wa Wa Nee song), 1989
- "So Good" (Zara Larsson song), 2017
- "So Good", by Austin Mahone from Oxygen, 2018
- "So Good", by Bat for Lashes from Lost Girls, 2019
- "So Good", by Big Sean and Metro Boomin from Double or Nothing, 2017
- "So Good", by Day26 from Forever in a Day, 2009
- "So Good", by Destiny's Child from The Writing's on the Wall, 1999
- "So Good", by Jennifer Lopez from A.K.A., 2014
- "So Good", by Juliet Roberts, 1997
- "So Good", by Red Velvet from RBB, 2018
- "So Good", by Rodney Atkins from Caught Up in the Country, 2019
- "So Good", by Stray Kids from Hop, 2024
- "So Good", from the Rock Angelz film soundtrack, 2005

== Other uses ==
- So Good (soy beverage), a brand of soy milk
- So Good (TV series), a 2008–2010 Hong Kong cooking program
- So Good: 100 Recipes from My Kitchen to Yours, a 2017 cookbook by Richard Blais

== See also ==
- Too Good (disambiguation)
