= Banga Banga =

Banga Banga or variants may refer to:

- Banga Banga!, a 2010 Korean film
- Banga Banga (Austin Mahone song)
- Banga Banga, a settlement in Idiofa, Democratic Republic of Congo
- "Banga Banga", a song by Thundermug
- Banga-banga, a Nigerian soldier's slouch hat

== See also ==
- Banga Banga Hamtori, Japanese cartoon
