= ForMe+You =

For Me + You

Mixtape by Austin Mahone
- Released: December 30, 2016
- Genre: Pop
- Length: 27:50
- Label: A.M. Music

Austin Mahone chronology
This Is Not the Album (2015)	For Me + You (2016)	Dirty Work – The Album (2017)

Singles from ForMe+You
- 1. "Lady" Released: February 10, 2017

For Me + You is the second mixtape by American singer Austin Mahone. It was released on December 30, 2016, by Mahone's own label A.M. Music through BMG Rights Management. The mixtape features three guest appearances from Juicy J, Pitbull and 2 Chainz.

== Background ==
On December 13, 2016, Mahone announced his upcoming mixtape ForMe+You. He debuted the lead single, "Lady" featuring Pitbull, at Pitbull's New Year's Revolution concert on December 30, the same day the mixtape would drop. This was their second collaboration, following 2014's "Mmm Yeah".

Talking about the recording process with iHeart Radio, Mahone said "Putting ForMe+You together was amazing, because I spent six months in LA, and I recorded probably 90 songs. And, I just picked the best eight songs that I thought would do really well, and put them all together, and made a nice little EP type mixtape project, and put that out for everyone". Of the sound, Mahone mentioned his intention with the mixtape was to move away from the bubblegum pop he was previously known for, and "incorporate some R&B flavor this time, because that's my personal taste in music".

Mahone embarked on his headlining tour, A Tour For Me + You, starting on May 31, to June 30, in support of the release of the mixtape.

== Release ==
"Lady" served as the mixtape's lead and only single, released on February 10, 2017. It is a remix of the 2001 "Lady (Hear Me Tonight)" by Modjo. The song reached number one on Billboard's US Dance Club Songs chart. On June 1, he released a music video for "Better with You".

== Critical reception ==
Girls' Life wrote that the mixtape's "sound reminds us a lot of Nick Jonas and Jason Derulo," as well as highlighting "Better with You" and "Wait Around" as standout tracks.

== Track listing ==
Digital download
No.	Title	Writer(s)	Producer(s)	Length
1.	"Love at Night" (featuring Juicy J)	Kesia Hollins; Jamal Jones; Jonathan Solone-Myvett	Jones	3:06
2.	"Pretty and Young"	Mahone; Luke Calleja; George Bechara; Leon Thomas III; James Saaib; Sean Kantrowitz; Kyle Van Riper	Calleja	3:05
3.	"Lady" (featuring Pitbull)	Mahone; Brandon Green; Armando Perez; Jerome Price; Mounhim Mustapha; Yann Destagnol; Romain Tranchart; Bernard Edwards; Nile Rodgers	Jerome Price	3:31
4.	"Better with You"	Mahone; Paul Blair; Joleen Beelle; Robert Villanueva; Drew Scott	Detroit City	3:54
5.	"Double Up"	Mahone; Blair; Grant Nelson	City	3:15
6.	"Wait Around"	Mahone; Brad Jennings; Villanueva	Mahone; Jennings	4:14
7.	"Except for Us"	Mahone; Loren Moore; Sasha Sloan; Skyler Stonestreet; Richard Vission	Moore; Vission	2:51
8.	"Shake It for Me" (featuring 2 Chainz)	Mahone; Theron Thomas; Timothy Thomas; Tauheed Epps; Sam Sumser; Sean Small	City; Sumser; Small	3:54
Total length:				27:50

== Personnel ==
Credits adapted from digital liner notes.

- Austin Mahone – lead vocals, primary artist
- Pitbull – featured artist, vocals (track 3)
- Juicy J – featured artist, vocals (track 1)
- 2 Chainz – featured artist, vocals (track 8)
- Ari Blitz – guitar, engineer, mastering
- Gio Murillo – engineer
- Larry Ryckman – mastering

== Charts ==
Chart performance for ForMe+You
Chart (2017)	Peak position
US Independent Albums (Billboard)	12
US Top Current Album Sales (Billboard)	93

== Release history ==
Region	Date	Format	Label	Ref.
Various	December 30, 2016	Digital download	A.M. Music	
