= The Secret (Austin Mahone EP) =

EP by Austin Mahone
- Released: May 23, 2014
- Recorded: 2013–14
- Genres: Pop; EDM
- Length: 26:59
- Labels: Cash Money; Republic; Chase
- Producers: RedOne; Austin Mahone; Jimmy Joker; The Futuristics; Cook Classics; Fredrik Thomander; Tiny Island; Maejor

Austin Mahone chronology
Extended Play (2013)	The Secret (2014)	This Is Not the Album (2015)

Singles from The Secret
- 1. "What About Love" Released: June 10, 2013; 2. "Mmm Yeah" Released: January 26, 2014

The Secret is the second extended play by American singer Austin Mahone. It was released on May 23, 2014, through Cash Money Records, Republic Records, and Chase Records. The EP was produced by Mahone himself, alongside RedOne, Jimmy Joker, The Futuristics, Cook Classics, Fredrik Thomander, Tiny Island, and Maejor, and features a guest appearance from American rapper Pitbull.

Two singles were released from the project. The EP's lead single, "What About Love", peaked at number 66 on the Billboard Hot 100. The second single, "Mmm Yeah" charted much higher, reaching number 49 on the Billboard Hot 100. The tracks "U", "Till I Find You", "All I Ever Need", "Shadow", and "Secret" were also released as promotional singles.

The Secret debuted at number five on the US Billboard 200, selling 46,000 copies in its opening week. The EP is currently Mahone's highest-charting project to date. To promote the project, Mahone appeared in several televised performances and embarked on a world tour. The music videos for the two singles were nominated for MTV Video Music Awards, with "What About Love" winning.

== Background ==
In an interview with Billboard on November 4, 2013, Mahone informed the magazine that the album would see an additional collaboration with Flo Rida and maybe one or two other to-be-determined guests. He added: "It's coming along amazing – I'm just trying to have every little detail and just make it absolutely perfect for my fans." The direction of the EP reminisces a sound and themes of '90s pop music and has clear influences of Britney Spears, Backstreet Boys and *NSYNC. It was later announced that The Secret would be released on May 27, 2014, although it was released early in Europe on May 23.

== Composition ==
The Secret contains a total of eleven songs, eight of which are in the standard edition, one song in the international edition and two songs in the Japanese edition. It is described by music critics as a pop and EDM project. According to Mahone, the sound is a mixture of pop, R&B, electronic dance and 1990s Backstreet Boys. When asked about the EP in an interview with MTV News, he said that the songs in his upcoming album would "sound like "What About Love" kind of like that EDM, like I said, old school/new school." Writing for So So Gay, David Lim noted the EP's sound to be influenced by Swedish pop producer Max Martin, who created songs for late-1990s teen pop stars such as Britney Spears, Backstreet Boys and *NSYNC. Lim later went on to call the EP a "shout of neon-bright tunes" and said: "The catchy melodies and electronic beats suit Austin’s own clean-cut, all singing-and-dancing persona, but at times it puts a wall between him and the listener."

"Mmm Yeah" is a dance-pop song which contains a "swirling" production, funk-influenced trumpets, a percussion-heavy four on the floor electropop beat, and influences of Chicago house, hip hop, and Latin music. The track heavily samples Lidell Townsell's 1992 single "Nu Nu". Lyrically, the song speaks of being rejected by an attractive woman walking down a street: "We can do whatever/ Do whatever we want/ When she walked past me I said 'hey, hey, hey' So tell me where you from where you want to go/ She walked past me like I ain't say a word". "All I Ever Need" is a "breezy" downtempo R&B and pop slow jam.

== Singles ==
"What About Love" was released as the lead single on June 10, 2013, though included only in the international version of the project. The song peaked at number 66 on the Billboard Hot 100 and peaked at number 18 on the US Mainstream Top 40 chart.

"Mmm Yeah" was released as the second and final single on January 26, 2014, and features rapper Pitbull. The song went on to become Mahone's highest charting song to date, peaking at number 49 on the Billboard Hot 100, and peaking within the top 40 of various other countries including Australia, Canada, Spain, and the UK.

=== Promotional singles ===
"U" was released as the first promotional single on February 14, 2014. "Till I Find You" was released as the second promotional single on April 18. "All I Ever Need" was released as the third promotional single on May 13. The music video was released on May 22. "Shadow" was released as the fourth promotional single on May 26, during a performance on the Today. Mahone released the official video through Vevo on May 29. "Secret" was released as the fifth and final promotional single on September 24, along with the music video.

== Critical reception ==
Professional ratings
Review scores
Source	Rating
AllMusic	3/5 stars
Billboard	3.5/5 stars
Rolling Stone	2/5 stars
USA Today	2.5/4 stars

In her review of the EP, Elysa Gardner of USA Today gave a mixed response, saying: "To call him "baby Bieber" wouldn't be fair; the generically catchy tunes hark back to N' Sync, Backstreet Boys and even New Kids. His creamy yearning should set young hearts aflutter." Billboard gave the EP a three and a half out of five star rating, while Rolling Stone gave it a negative review of two out of five stars.

== Commercial performance ==
The Secret debuted at number 5 on the Billboard 200 with sales of 46,000 copies in its opening week. As of November 2014, The Secret has sold 100,000 copies in the United States.

== Track listing ==
Standard edition

No.	Title	Writer(s)	Producer(s)	Length
1.	"Till I Find You"	Austin Mahone; RedOne; Ameerah Roelants; Mika Guillory; Jimmy Joker; AJ Junior; Bilal "The Chef" Hajji	RedOne; Joker	3:00
2.	"Next to You"	Mahone; RedOne; Joker; Björn Djupstrom	RedOne; Joker	3:04
3.	"Mmm Yeah" (featuring Pitbull)	Mahone; Armando Pérez; Alex Schwartz; Joe Khajadourian; William Lobban-Bean; Ethan Lowery; Chase Lett; Lamar Mahone; Keith Mayberry; Craig Simpkins; Lidell Townsell	The Futuristics; Cook Classics; Schwartz^{[a]}	3:51
4.	"Secret"	Mahone; RedOne; Joker; Mika Guillory; Rivington Starchild; Junior	RedOne; Joker	3:18
5.	"Can't Fight This Love"	Mahone; RedOne; Aleena Gibson; Kevin Högdahl; Fredrik Thomander	RedOne; Thomander	2:46
6.	"All I Ever Need"	Mahone; Robert Villanueva	Mahone	3:33
7.	"The One I've Waited For"	Mahone; RedOne; Tiny Island; AJ Junior	RedOne; Tiny Island	3:39
8.	"Shadow" (acoustic)	Mahone; Gibson; Roelants	RedOne; Thomander	3:48
Total length:				26:59

International bonus track
No.	Title	Writer(s)	Producer(s)	Length
9.	"What About Love"	Mahone; RedOne; Joker; Junior; Hajji; Mohombi Moupondo; Starchild	RedOne; Joker	3:23
Total length:				30:22

Japanese edition bonus tracks
No.	Title	Writer(s)	Producer(s)	Length
10.	"U"	Mahone; Brandon Green	Maejor	3:36
11.	"Mmm Yeah" (featuring Pitbull) (Jump Smokers Remix)	Mahone; Armando Pérez; Alex Schwartz; Joe Khajadourian; William Lobban-Bean; Ethan Lowery; Lamar Mahone; Keith Mayberry; Craig Simpkins; Lidell Townsell	The Futuristics; Cook Classics; Schwartz^{[a]}; Jump Smokers^{[b]}	4:22
Total length:				37:20

Japanese deluxe edition DVD
No.	Title	Director	Length
1.	"Mmm Yeah" (featuring Pitbull) (music video)	Rocco Valdes; Dan Roof
2.	"What About Love" (music video)	Colin Tilley
3.	"Mmm Yeah" (featuring Pitbull) (lyric video)	N/A
4.	"Mmm Yeah" (featuring Pitbull) (live)	N/A
5.	"What About Love" (live)	N/A
6.	"Behind the Scenes in Japan"	N/A

Notes

- ^{^[a]} signifies a vocal producer
- ^{^[b]} signifies remixer

== Charts ==
=== Weekly charts ===
Weekly chart performance for The Secret
Chart (2014)	Peak position
Australian Albums (ARIA)	74
Belgian Albums (Ultratop Flanders)	60
Belgian Albums (Ultratop Wallonia)	129
Canadian Albums (Billboard)	11
Danish Albums (Hitlisten)	18
Dutch Albums (Album Top 100)	42
French Albums (SNEP)	85
Italian Albums (FIMI)	12
Japanese Albums (Oricon)	49
Mexican Albums (Top 100 Mexico)	26
Norwegian Albums (VG-lista)	11
South Korean Albums (Gaon)	26
Spanish Albums (Promusicae)	27
Taiwanese Albums (Five Music)	14
UK Albums (Official Charts)	82
US Billboard 200	5

=== Year-end charts ===
Year-end chart positions for The Secret
Chart (2014)	Position
Mexican Albums (AMPROFON)	92

== Certifications ==
Region	Certification	Certified units/sales
Mexico (AMPROFON)	Gold	30,000^{^}
^{^} Shipments figures based on certification alone.

== Release history ==
Release dates for The Secret
Region	Date	Format	Label	Ref.
Australia	May 23, 2014	CD; digital download	Chase; Cash Money	
Brazil	May 23, 2014	CD; digital download	Chase; Cash Money	
Europe	May 23, 2014	CD; digital download	Chase; Cash Money	
United States	May 27, 2014	CD; digital download	Chase; Cash Money	
Japan	June 18, 2014	CD; CD+DVD	Chase; Cash Money	
