= Put It on Me =

Put It On Me or Put It on Me may refer to:

- "Put It on Me" (Ja Rule song)
- "Put It on Me" (YoungBoy Never Broke Again song)
- "Put It on Me", a 2001 song by Dr. Dre, from the Training Day (soundtrack)
- "Put It on Me", a 2015 song by Austin Mahone, from his mixtape This Is Not the Album
- "Put It on Me", a 2026 song by Sully Burrows
