= Too Good to Be True =

Too Good to Be True may refer to:

== Film, television, and theatre ==
- Too Good to Be True (film), a 1988 made-for-TV movie
- 2 Good 2 Be True, a 2022 Philippine family drama romantic comedy television series
- Too Good to Be True, a scrapped spin-off of TV series Small Wonder
- Too Good to Be True, a 1601 play by Wentworth Smith, Henry Chettle and Richard Hathwaye
- Too Good to Be True (2003 TV series), a British drama thriller television series
- Too Good to Be True (2024 TV series), a British psychological thriller television series

== Albums ==
- Too Good to Be True (The Everly Brothers album), 2005
- Too Good to Be True (Rick Ross and Meek Mill album), 2023

== Songs ==
- "Too Good to Be True" (Clay Boland song), 1936
- "Too Good to Be True" (Danny Avila and the Vamps song), 2018
- "Too Good to Be True" (Edens Edge song), 2012
- "Too Good to Be True" (Michael Peterson song), 1998
- "Too Good to Be True" by Motörhead from March ör Die, 1992
- "Too Good to Be True", song by Tom Robinson Band on the 1978 album Power in the Darkness

== See also ==
- Too Good (disambiguation)
