= Yo-kai Watch: Forever Friends =

2018 Japanese film

Japanese name
- Kanji: 映画 妖怪ウォッチ FOREVER FRIENDS
Transcriptions
- Revised Hepburn: Eiga Yōkai Wotchi Fooebaa Furenzu
- Directed by: Shigeru Takahashi
- Based on: Yo-kai Watch by Level-5
- Music by: Kenichiro Saigo
- Production company: OLM, Inc.
- Distributed by: Toho
- Release date: December 14, 2018
- Running time: 100 minutes
- Country: Japan
- Language: Japanese
- Box office: ¥1,210,224,700

Yo-Kai Watch: Forever Friends (Note: Yo-kai Watch: Forever Friends (映画 妖怪ウォッチ FOREVER FRIENDS, Eiga Yōkai Wotchi Fooebaa Furenzu; lit. Yo-kai Watch the Movie: Forever Friends)) is a 2018 supernatural anime film produced by OLM, Inc. and distributed by Toho. It is the fifth film in the Yo-kai Watch film series, following the 2017 film Yo-kai Watch Shadowside: Oni-ō no Fukkatsu, and is the second film set in the 1960s and takes place 60 years before the original Yo-kai Watch anime series, featuring a young boy named Shin Shimomachi who adventures into the Yo-kai World with his Yo-kai friend Nekomata. It was directed by Shigeru Takahashi, and was released on Japanese theaters on December 14, 2018, alongside the first Dragon Ball Super movie, Dragon Ball Super: Broly, and the Japanese dub of The Grinch.

== Plot ==
Sakura Motomachi, Tokyo in the 1960s. Shin Shimomachi, a boy who lived happily, despite being poor, loses his mother, his only family member and falls into deep misfortune. Itsuki Takashiro, a boy who saves Shin, also lost his older sister. Those two boys are joined by Tae Arihoshi, a sorcecer girl who can see Yo-kai and together with Shin's guardian spirit Sū-san and new Yo-kai such as Nekomata, they take on a mysterious incident in order to retrieve the souls of their precious family! And what is the shocking truth that awaits them...!? This is a story about the friendship formed between three children and Yo-kai.

The film also tells the origin of how Lord Enma became the ruler of the Yo-kai World before the original anime series.

== Characters ==
- Atsumi Tanezaki as Shin Shimomachi (下町シン, Shimomachi Shin), The wielder of the Yo-kai Watch Elda Zero. Despite his poverty, he lived happily until his mother died, after which he fell into great despair. He then met his fellow Yo-kai friends and was joined by two children named Itsuki Takashiro and Tae Arihoshi, with the three planning to return the souls of the citizens of Japan from the soul-devouring fox Yo-kai Tamamo no Mae.
- Etsuko Kozakura as Nekomata (猫又, Nekomata), a classic black cat Yo-kai who meets and befriends Shin, who lost his mother, later adventuring alongside him and a group of children in the Yo-kai World. He has both a Shadowside form and a Godside form, the latter being known as 猫王バステト (Nekoō Basuteto).
- Ryōhei Kimura as Itsuki Takashiro (高城イツキ, Takashiro Itsuki), a young boy who saved Shin and is the wielder of the Yo-kai Watch Elda God. Like Shin, his older sister is gone because her soul was devoured by Tamamo no Mae.
- Nao Tōyama as Tae Arihoshi (有星タエ, Arihoshi Tae), a young female sorcerer from the Arihoshi Clan who is likely related to Akinori from the fourth film. She is one of the Three Children who adventures in the Yo-kai World during the events of the film.
- Shun Oguri as Shien (紫炎, Shien). He's one of the candidates for the Yo-kai World's next ruler and son of Ancient Enma, teaming up with Tamamo to devour souls and gain power.
- Chiemi Blouson as Tamamo (タマモ, Tamamo), a humanoid fox Yo-kai who devours the souls of the citizens of Japan and works alongside Shien. She's also known as Tamamo no Mae (玉藻前, Tanamo no Mae) in her Shadowside form.
- Ryōhei Kimura as Lord Enma (エンマ大王, Enma Daiō), The ruler of the Yo-kai World and grandson of Ancient Enma. As initially teased in Corocoro, Enma has three new forms that were introduced in the movie: Yasha Enma, Yasha Enma Rasetsu & Yasha Enma Benibana.
- Takehito Koyasu as Zazel (ぬらりひょん, Nurarihyon), a servant and apprentice of Ancient Enma and later of Lord Enma.
- Shintaro Asanuma as ざしきわらし (Zashiki-Warashi), a guardian spirit focused on pursuing his beauty. Like Nekomata, he has a Godside form, which is based on a Tengu.

== Release ==
The film released on December 14, 2018, and opened at #4 at the Japanese box office. Early pre-orders of the movie tickets allowed viewers to obtain a Yo-kai Ark of Nekomata's Lightside form, which can be scanned through the Nintendo Switch to obtain Nekomata in Yo-kai Watch 4.
