= Nu Nu =

Single by Lidell Townsell

from the album Harmony
- Released: 1992
- Genre: House
- Label: Mercury/PolyGram
- Songwriters: Lidell Townsell, K. Fingers (Craig Simpkins), Hula (Lamar Hula Mahone), Silk E (Keith Mayberry), b. Coleman

Lidell Townsell singles chronology
"Get with U" (1992)	"Nu Nu" (1992)

"Nu Nu" is the second single of Chicago house musician Lidell Townsell, which featured duo M.T.F. The song was released from his 1992 Mercury/PolyGram Records album release Harmony. It was recorded at the Playroom Recording Studio in Chicago Heights, IL by Recording Engineer Jerome Mark Mikulich.

== Chart performance ==
"Nu Nu" reached #1 on the US Hot Dance Music/Maxi Singles chart and #2 on the US Hot Dance Music/Club Play chart. It was #26 on the Billboard Hot 100 and #44 on the US Hot Hip-Hop & R&B Singles.

== FannyPack version ==
New York's hip hop/electronic group FannyPack covered the song in 2005, renaming it "Nu Nu (Yeah Yeah)". The Double J & Haze Extended Mix of this version appeared on the soundtrack of the 2006 film "Stick It" and on the soundtrack of the 2009 film "Fired Up!"

This version was used in promos by American television network NBC on its weeknight talk show Late Night with Jimmy Fallon during 2010.

== Austin Mahone/Pitbull sampled version ==
The 2014 song "Mmm Yeah" by Austin Mahone featuring Pitbull heavily samples the lyrics and verses from "Nu Nu" and most notably samples the chorus.
