= A Tour For Me + You =

2017 concert tour by Austin Mahone

- National tour by Austin Mahone
- Promotional poster for tour
- Location: U.S., North America
- Associated album: ForMe+You
- Start date: May 31, 2017
- End date: June 29, 2017
- No. of shows: 22 in North America

Austin Mahone concert chronology
- Austin Mahone: Live on Tour (2014); A Tour For Me + You (2017); Oxygen Tour (2018)

A Tour For Me + You was the third concert tour by American singer Austin Mahone in support of his second mixtape, ForMe+You. The tour began in Fort Lauderdale, and concluded in Los Angeles.

== Background and development ==
Following the release of ForMe+You, Mahone announced he would be embarking on his third headlining concert tour, visiting 22 cities around North America.

== Shows ==
List of concerts, showing date, city, country, venue
Date	City	Country	Venue	Opening act
North America
May 31, 2017	Fort Lauderdale	United States	Culture Room	The YRS
June 1, 2017	St. Petersburg	United States	The Stage Theatre	The YRS
June 3, 2017	San Antonio	United States	Paper Tiger	The YRS
June 4, 2017	Houston	United States	The Studio	The YRS
June 5, 2017	Dallas	United States	Trees	The YRS
June 7, 2017	St. Louis	United States	The Firebird	The YRS
June 8, 2017	Louisville	United States	Diamond Pub Concert Hall	The YRS
June 9, 2017	Atlanta	United States	The Loft	The YRS
June 11, 2017	Washington, D.C.	United States	U Street Music Hall	The YRS
June 12, 2017	Philadelphia	United States	Coda	The YRS
June 13, 2017	New York City	United States	Webster Hall	The YRS
June 14, 2017	Boston	United States	Paradise Rock Club	The YRS
June 16, 2017	Freehold	United States	iPlay America	The YRS
June 17, 2017	Poughkeepsie	United States	Radio Show	The YRS
June 18, 2017	Buffalo	United States	Kiss The Summer Hello	The YRS
June 19, 2017	Detroit	United States	The Magic Stick	The YRS
June 21, 2017	Chicago	United States	Park West	The YRS
June 24, 2017	Boise	United States	Boise Music Festival	The YRS
June 25, 2017	Seattle	United States	Neumos	The YRS
June 26, 2017	Portland	United States	Hawthorne Theatre	The YRS
June 28, 2017	San Francisco	United States	Social Hall SF	The YRS
June 29, 2017	Los Angeles	United States	The Fonda Theatre	The YRS
