= Austin Mahone Takeover =

- Genre: Documentary
- Created by: Austin Mahone
- Written by: Ryan Bell
- Starring: Austin Mahone
- Country of origin: United States
- Original language: English
- No. of seasons: 2
- No. of episodes: 60

Production
- Production location: United States

Original release
- Network: Austin Mahone.com
- Release: November 2, 2012 – May 31, 2013

Austin Mahone Takeover is a web documentary series about singer Austin Mahone, broadcast on November 2, 2012. It was directed by Ryan Bell.

== History ==
The series shows the life and career of singer Austin Mahone with their first steps in the music world. The episodes show Mahone in awards, events, performances and moments with fans. The web series had two seasons with 60 episodes released on YouTube.

== Guest appearances and cameos ==
- Sean Kingston
- Enrique Iglesias
- Bridgit Mendler
- Akon
- Fifth Harmony
- Selena Gomez
- Psy
- Kelly Rowland
- T-Pain
- Flo Rida

== Episodes ==
=== Season 1 (2012-13) ===
No. overall	No. in season	Title	Directed by	Original release date
1	1	"Album Cover Photo Shoot"	Ryan Bell	November 2, 2012
2	2	"Choreography Lesson"	Ryan Bell	November 9, 2012
3	3	"Performs Live in Boston"	Ryan Bell	November 16, 2012
4	4	"Salt Lake City Radio Interview & Performance"	Ryan Bell	November 18, 2012
5	5	"Austin Mahone Goes Bowling"	Ryan Bell	November 23, 2012
6	6	"Austin Mahone Loves His Mom"	Ryan Bell	November 25, 2012
7	7	"Austin Mahone Is Principal for a Day"	Ryan Bell	November 25, 2012
8	8	"Live in London"	Ryan Bell	November 30, 2012
9	9	"Austin Mahone Room Tour!"	Ryan Bell	December 7, 2012
10	10	"Press & Shawty Shawty Acoustic in London"	Ryan Bell	December 7, 2012
11	11	"Go Ice Skating with Austin Mahone"	Ryan Bell	December 14, 2012
12	12	"Skype Call w/ MuchMusic"	Ryan Bell	December 14, 2012
13	13	"Play Basketball with Austin Mahone"	Ryan Bell	December 21, 2012
14	14	"Toronto Big Jingle"	Ryan Bell	December 21, 2012
15	15	"Jingle Ball with Sean Kingston & Enrique Iglesias"	Ryan Bell	December 28, 2012
16	16	"Deer Park"	Ryan Bell	December 28, 2012
17	17	"Austin Mahone's Jingle Ball Dance Battle"	Ryan Bell	January 5, 2013
18	18	"Live at Jingle Ball Chicago"	Ryan Bell	January 5, 2013
19	19	"Press Day in New York City Part 1"	Ryan Bell	January 11, 2013
20	20	"Austin SYJAF Performance Mashup"	Ryan Bell	January 11, 2013
21	21	"How to Skate with Austin Mahone and Benny Harlem"	Ryan Bell	January 18, 2013
22	22	"Press Day in New York City Part 2"	Ryan Bell	January 18, 2013
23	23	"Austin Pranks Dave"	Ryan Bell	January 25, 2013
24	24	"Austin in Germany at Bravo"	Ryan Bell	January 25, 2013
25	25	"Austin Mahone Visits Germany"	Ryan Bell	February 1, 2013
26	26	"Austin Mahone Texas Radio Promo"	Ryan Bell	February 1, 2013
27	27	"Mahone-Coming at Bjorn's"	Ryan Bell	February 8, 2013
28	28	"Austin Mahone Plays Live at a Texas Waterpark"	Ryan Bell	February 8, 2013
29	29	"Austin Mahone Swag"	Ryan Bell	February 17, 2013
30	30	"Times Square Invasion with Austin Mahone"	Ryan Bell	February 17, 2013
31	31	"Field Goal Challenge"	Ryan Bell	February 22, 2013
32	32	"Video Premiere in New York"	Ryan Bell	February 22, 2013
33	33	"Guest Hosts Much Music TV in Toronto"	Ryan Bell	March 1, 2013
34	34	"Pool Party in New York City"	Ryan Bell	March 1, 2013
35	35	"Austin Mahone Visits Philly"	Ryan Bell	March 8, 2013
36	36	"Private Dance Rehearsal"	Ryan Bell	March 8, 2013
37	37	"Lucky Number 74"	Ryan Bell	March 13, 2013
38	38	"Austin Mahone Miami Heat"	Ryan Bell	March 13, 2013
39	39	"BOP Tiger Beat Photo Shoot"	Ryan Bell	March 22, 2013
40	40	"Trukfit Event in Texas"	Ryan Bell	March 22, 2013
41	41	"Austin Mahone at the Kids Choice Awards"	Ryan Bell	March 29, 2013
42	42	"Austin Mahone Hangs with His Friends at Universal Studios in Orlando"	Ryan Bell	March 29, 2013
43	43	"Birthday Surprise"	Ryan Bell	April 5, 2013
44	44	"Pool Challenge with Mama Mahone"	Ryan Bell	April 5, 2013

=== Season 2 (2013) ===
No. overall	No. in season	Title	Directed by	Original release date
1	45	"Austin Mahone Plays Beach Football with Friends"	Ryan Bell	April 12, 2013
2	46–47	"Houston Radio Event/Hot 95.7 Bowling"	Ryan Bell	April 12, 2013
3	48	"Arcade Party"	Ryan Bell	April 19, 2013
4	49	"Arcade Dance Off"	Ryan Bell	April 19, 2013
5	50	"Perfect Girl"	Ryan Bell	April 26, 2013
6	51	"Austin's Surprise Birthday Performance"	Ryan Bell	April 26, 2013
7	52	"Austin Mahone Amusement Park Hang Out in Cleveland"	Ryan Bell	May 2, 2013
8	53	"Austin Mahone Wins a Radio Disney Music Award"	Ryan Bell	May 3, 2013
9	54	"Austin Mahone and President Obama"	Ryan Bell	May 8, 2013
10	55	"Austin Learns to Speak Spanish"	Ryan Bell	May 10, 2013
11	56	"Mama Mahone's Birthday"	Ryan Bell	May 18, 2013
12	57	"Austin Mahone Fanmail"	Ryan Bell	May 28, 2013
13	58	"Austin Mahone Fanmail pt.2"	Ryan Bell	May 28, 2013
14	59	"Austin Mahone and Selena Gomez at the Billboard Music Awards"	Ryan Bell	May 31, 2013
15	60	"Austin Mahone Performs at Aztec Stadium in Mexico"	Ryan Bell	May 31, 2013
