= This Is Not the Album =

Mixtape by Austin Mahone
- Released: December 17, 2015
- Genre: Pop; hip-hop
- Length: 68:25
- Label: A.M. Music
- Producer: Austin Mahone; Drumma Boy

Austin Mahone chronology
| The Secret (2014) | This Is Not the Album (2015) | ForMe+You (2016) |

This Is Not the Album is the debut mixtape by American singer-songwriter Austin Mahone. The mixtape was released independently on December 17, 2015 as a free download via SoundCloud and WeTransfer. Guest musicians on the mixtape include Becky G, Sage the Gemini and Chris Brown.

== Background ==
In July 2015, Mahone announced that he planned on releasing a new album by the end of year. He was working on the album in Los Angeles, California with producers and songwriters Jason Evigan, R. City and The Monsters & Strangerz. However, on December 14, Mahone announced the release of his mixtape This is Not the Album instead and that he would continue working on his debut album.

"I've got some new music that I'm really excited for you to hear, that I’ve been working real hard on. I know the music you’ve been wanting hasn’t come yet, but I've been writing, producing and getting better at what I truly love to do, and thats why I made this project. Because I don’t know when the album will be out so this is a collection of songs that were made by myself and with the help of some good friends to hold you guys over until it does. So in the meantime I'll be working on my 1st debut album because #THISISNOTTHEALBUM."

The mixtape features collaborations with Chris Brown, Sage The Gemini, T-Pain, Becky G, Kalin and Myles, Rob Villa and KYLE.

== Composition ==
This Is Not the Album features pop and hip-hop influenced sounds. The mixtape was mostly produced and written by Mahone. The fourth song, "Do It Right" is an R&B-inspired track with influences of Chris Brown. The thirteenth track "Apology" was originally slated for his debut album, however, Mahone stated he didn't want the song to go to waste. Mahone also added that he enjoyed working with Kalin and Myles on the second track, "Same Girl". The sixteenth track "Not Far", is described as a pop ballad song. The song is dedicated to Mahone's grandmother. "Put It On Me" has been described as a club-track.

== Release ==
Mahone premiered a new track for his mixtape, "Do It Right" on September 2, 2015 and features Rob Villa. On September 14, he released another track, "On Your Way" as a free download, featuring KYLE. On September 23, Mahone released "Not Far" for free on his SoundCloud page. "Put It On Me" was released on October 7, 2015 and features Sage the Gemini. A music video for the song premiered via Apple Music on March 3, 2016.

== Track listing ==
Standard edition
| No. | Title | Length |
|---|---|---|
| 1. | "Put It On Me" (featuring Sage the Gemini) | 3:09 |
| 2. | "Same Girl" (featuring Kalin and Myles) | 3:15 |
| 3. | "Brand New" | 3:49 |
| 4. | "Do It Right" (featuring Rob Villa) | 3:41 |
| 5. | "Rollin" (featuring Becky G) | 3:58 |
| 6. | "On Your Way" (featuring KYLE) | 4:04 |
| 7. | "Caught Up" | 3:15 |
| 8. | "Something So Real" | 3:26 |
| 9. | "Love You Anyways" (featuring Rob Villa) | 3:30 |
| 10. | "What It Do" | 3:36 |
| 11. | "Deep End" | 3:46 |
| 12. | "Hate to Let You Go" | 3:33 |
| 13. | "Apology" | 3:09 |
| 14. | "Who's Gonna Love You Now" | 1:33 |
| 15. | "Hold it Against Me" | 3:52 |
| 16. | "Not Far" | 4:56 |

SoundCloud edition
| No. | Title | Length |
|---|---|---|
| 10. | "Red Lights" (Remix) (featuring Chris Brown) | 3:36 |
| 11. | "What It Do" | 3:36 |
| 12. | "Deep End" | 3:46 |
| 13. | "Hate to Let You Go" | 3:33 |
| 14. | "Apology" | 3:09 |
| 15. | "Who's Gonna Love You Now" | 1:33 |
| 16. | "Hold it Against Me" | 3:52 |
| 17. | "If I Ain't Got You" (featuring Kyle Dion) | 3:24 |
| 18. | "Not Far" | 4:56 |
| 19. | "Dirty Work" (Remix) (featuring T-Pain) | 4:05 |
| Total length: | | 68:25 |

== Credits and personnel ==
Credits for This Is Not the Album adapted from AllMusic.

Musicians

- Austin Mahone – primary artist, composer, producer

Additional musicians

- Becky G – featured artist
- Chris Brown – featured artist
- Kalin and Myles – featured artist
- KYLE – featured artist
- Rob Villa – composer, featured artist
- Sage the Gemini – featured artist
- T-Pain – featured artist

Production

- Ben Hogarth – recording engineer
- Colin Leonard – mastering
- Drumma Boy – producer

== Release history ==
Release dates and formats for This Is Not the Album
| Region | Date | Format | Label | Ref. |
|---|---|---|---|---|
| Various | December 17, 2015 | Digital download; streaming | A.M. Music | |
