= Send It =

2016 single by Austin Mahone featuring Rich Homie Quan

Promotional single by Austin Mahone featuring Rich Homie Quan
- B-side: "Way Up"
- Released: August 19, 2016
- Genre: Bounce; R&B
- Length: 3:01
- Label: A.M. Music LLC; Mr. 305
- Songwriters: Austin Mahone; Rich Homie Quan; Brandon Green; Joey Lopez; Robert Villanueva; Felix de Laet; Radboud Miedema; Janieck Devy
- Producer: Bei Maejor

Austin Mahone chronology
"Joyride" (2016)	"Send It" (2016)	"Way Up" (2016)

Rich Homie Quan chronology
"Finesse" (2016)	"Send It" (2016)	"Replay" (2017)

Music video
- "Send It (feat. Rich Homie Quan) (Lyric Video)" on YouTube

"Send It" is a song by American singer-songwriter Austin Mahone featuring American rapper Rich Homie Quan, released as a promotional single on August 19, 2016, by A.M. Music LLC and Mr. 305.

== Background ==
Mahone began promoting the track on his social media with the hashtag #SendItWayUp819. After teasing the track, on August 19, 2016, he released "Send It", along with another track "Way Up" onto music streaming services.

"Send It" was written by Austin Mahone, Rich Homie Quan, Joey Lopez, Robert Villanueva, Felix de Laet, Radboud Miedema and Janieck Devy, while production was handled by Bei Maejor, who also co-wrote the track. Lyrically, the song features sexually explicit content and is about Mahone asking a girl to send him nudes. Musically, the track is described as bounce and R&B.

The song became famous in China after it was adopted in the social media app TikTok. There was a Cantonese version of the song. The song has been streamed over 150K times on the music app Xiami Music.

== Critical response ==
"Send It" was met with negative reviews from music critics and fans, with various people calling the song "trashy", "disgusting", "creepy" and "problematic." Seventeen magazine describes the song as every girl's texting nightmare with lyrics straight out of the "How to Convince a Girl to Send You Nudes handbook", such as "Send it to my phone, send it to my phone / You already know I keep it on the low / Baby, you can trust me, promise I'm alone / I won't tell a soul, send it to my phone." Some have said the song's lyrics make them feel disgusted. De Elizabeth of Teen Vogue criticized the lyrics calling it "a red flag" and sends "the wrong kind of message."

Others have said that many artists talk about sex and nude photos in their songs all the time, and that Mahone is saying what everyone thinks.

== Music video ==
The music video for "Send It" was released on September 12, 2016, and was directed by Y2K.

== Track listing ==
Digital download
No.	Title	Length
1.	"Send It" (ft. Rich Homie Quan)	3:01

== Personnel ==
Credits for "Send It" adapted from digital liner notes.

- Austin Mahone – vocals, composer, lyricist
- Rich Homie Quan – vocals, composer, lyricist
- Bei Maejor – producer, composer, lyricist, arrangement
- Joey Lopez – composer, lyricist
- Robert Villanueva – composer, lyricist
- Felix de Laet – composer, lyricist, arrangement
- Radboud Miedema – composer, lyricist, arrangement
- Janieck Devy – composer, lyricist, arrangement
- Fabian Marasciullo – recording engineer
- McCoy Socalgargoyle – recording engineer
- Colin Leonard – recording engineer

== Release history ==
Release dates for "Send It"
Region	Date	Format	Label	Ref.
Various	August 19, 2016	Digital download	A.M. Music; Mr. 305	
