= Too Good (disambiguation) =

"Too Good" is a 2016 song by Drake featuring Rihanna.

Too Good may also refer to:

- "Too Good", a song by Arlo Parks from the 2021 album Collapsed in Sunbeams
- "Too Good", a 1960 song by Little Tony
- Too Good & Co., formerly Two Good, a brand of yogurt manufactured by Danone

== See also ==
- So Good (disambiguation)
- Too Good to Be True (disambiguation)
