= Creatures of the Night (Hardwell and Austin Mahone song) =

Song by Hardwell and Austin Mahone

Single by Hardwell and Austin Mahone

from the album Dirty Work
- Released: 12 May 2017
- Genre: Future bass; dance-pop
- Length: 3:00
- Label: Revealed; Virgin EMI; Universal
- Songwriter(s): Austin Mahone; Robert van de Corput; Conor Patton; Sam Gray; Benjamin David Hemsley; Stevce Manovski
- Producer(s): Hardwell, Conro (co-prod.)

Hardwell singles chronology
"Thinking About You" (2017)	"Creatures of the Night" (2017)	"Power" (2017)

Austin Mahone singles chronology
"Bad Boyz" (2017)	"Creatures of the Night" (2017)	"Say Hi" (2017)

"Creatures of the Night" is a song by Dutch DJ Hardwell and American pop singer Austin Mahone. The song was released through Hardwell's Revealed Recordings label. It was premiered by Hardwell at the 2017 Ultra Music Festival at Miami in March.

== Background ==
On 8 March 2017, Hardwell announced the release of the song on Twitter. Digital Journal reviewed the song as an upbeat and silk-smooth summer anthem with impressive drop and catchy melodies. According to Nielsen Music, the song was streamed 582,000 times in the United States and downloaded over 2,000 times in the week ending 18 May.

== Track listing ==
Digital download - Original
No.	Title	Length
1.	"Creatures of the Night"	3:00

PBH & Jack Shizzle Remix
No.	Title	Length
1.	"Creatures of the Night (PBH & Jack Shizzle Remix)"	2:52

The Remixes
No.	Title	Length
1.	"Creatures of the Night (Madison Mars Remix)"	3:23
2.	"Creatures of the Night (PBH & Jack Shizzle Remix)"	2:52
3.	"Creatures of the Night (Sebastien Remix)"	3:24
4.	"Creatures of the Night (Charming Horses Remix)"	3:19
5.	"Creatures of the Night (Snareskin Remix)"	2:56
6.	"Creatures of the Night (Luca Testa Remix)"	3:15
7.	"Creatures of the Night (Madison Mars Extended Mix)"	3:47
8.	"Creatures of the Night (PBH & Jack Shizzle Extended Mix)"	4:07
9.	"Creatures of the Night (Sebastien Extended Mix)"	4:52
10.	"Creatures of the Night (Charming Horses Extended Mix)"	4:42
11.	"Creatures of the Night (Luca Testa Extended Mix)"	4:04

Creatures of the Night (Acoustic Version)
No.	Title	Length
1.	"Creatures of the Night (Acoustic Version)"	2:53

Creatures of the Night (KVR Remix)
No.	Title	Length
1.	"Creatures of the Night (KVR Remix)"	2:51

== Charts ==
=== Weekly charts ===
Weekly chart performance for "Creatures of the Night"
Chart (2017)	Peak position
Belgium Dance (Ultratop Flanders)	12
Japan (Dance Hits 20)	5
Netherlands (Dutch Top 40)	30
Netherlands (Single Top 100)	99
US Dance Club Songs (Billboard)	1
US Hot Dance/Electronic Songs (Billboard)	29

=== Year-end charts ===
Year-end chart performance for "Creatures of the Night"
Chart (2017)	Position
Netherlands (Dutch Top 40)	170
US Dance Club Songs (Billboard)	48
US Hot Dance/Electronic Songs (Billboard)	99

== Release history ==
Region	Date	Format	Version(s)	Label	Ref.
Various	May 12, 2017	Digital download	Original	Revealed; Polydor; Island; Universal	
Various	July 14, 2017	Digital download	PBH & Jack Shizzle Remix	Revealed; Polydor; Island; Universal	
Various	August 11, 2017	Digital download	The Remixes	Revealed; Polydor; Island; Universal	
Various	September 21, 2017	Digital download	Acoustic Version	Revealed; Polydor; Island; Universal	
Various	December 8, 2017	Digital download	KVR Remix	Revealed; Polydor; Island; Universal	
