= Dancing with Nobody =

Single by Austin Mahone
- Released: June 19, 2019
- Genre: Funk
- Length: 3:17
- Label: A.M. Music
- Songwriters: Jim Lavigne; Sam Martin; Ian Kirkpatrick; Lindy Robbins; Jacob Luttrell; Austin Mahone
- Producer: Kirkpatrick

Austin Mahone singles chronology
"Anxious" (2019)	"Dancing with Nobody" (2019)	"Summer Love" (2020)

Music video
- "Dancing with Nobody" on YouTube

"Dancing with Nobody" is a song by American pop singer Austin Mahone. It was released as a non-album single on June 19, 2019, via A.M. Music. The song peaked at number 17 on the Billboard Mexico Ingles Airplay chart.

== Background ==
In an interview with Billboard Argentia, Mahone stated that the song is about "finding that person with whom you are comfortable and can be 100% you."

== Composition ==
"Dancing with Nobody" was written by Austin Mahone, Jim Lavigne, Ian Kirkpatrick, Sam Martin, Jacob Luttrell and Lindy Robbins, while production was handled by Kirkpatrick. The song has been described as a "feel-good anthem" track as stated by Mahone. He also added that he wanted the track "to be a fun, upbeat song that will make everyone feel that they just can't help but get up and dance."

== Critical reception ==
Mike Nied of Idolator stated, "he delivers some very romantic lyrics over a danceable beat." He also complimented the song by calling it the "best" single release he had in 2019, compared to "Why Don't We" and "Anxious". Ivy Sandoval of Soundigest remarked, "This new single is the perfect upbeat song with a groovy rhythm that's sure to get you on your feet. It's an infectious beat, giving off a hint of '70s vibes, along with a modern beat of drums, guitars and his effortless falsettos."

== Music video ==
The music video was released on June 19, 2019. It was directed by Trent Barboza and was filmed in Venice beach.

== Track listing ==
Digital download
No.	Title	Length
1.	"Dancing with Nobody"	3:17
2.	"Why Don't We"	2:49
3.	"Anxious"	2:42

== Credits and personnel ==
Credits for "Dancing with Nobody" adapted from digital liner notes.

- Austin Mahone – vocals, composer, lyricist
- Ian Kirkpatrick – producer, composer, lyricist
- Lindy Robbins – composer, lyricist
- Jim Lavigne – composer, lyricist
- Sam Martin – composer, lyricist
- Jacob Luttrell – composer, lyricist

== Charts ==
Chart performance for "Dancing with Nobody"
Chart (2019)	Peak position
Mexico Ingles Airplay (Billboard)	17

== Release history ==
Release history for "Dancing with Nobody"
Region	Date	Format	Label	Ref.
Various	June 19, 2019	Digital download; streaming	A.M. Music	
