= All I Ever Need =

Promotional single by Austin Mahone

from the album The Secret
- Released: May 13, 2014
- Genre: R&B
- Length: 3:33
- Label: Chase; Cash Money; Republic
- Songwriter(s): Austin Mahone; Robert Villanueva
- Producer(s): Austin Mahone

Music video
- "All I Ever Need" on YouTube

"All I Ever Need" is a song by American pop singer-songwriter Austin Mahone. It was released on May 13, 2014, as the third promotional single from his second extended play, The Secret.

The song was met with positive reviews from music critics, most praising Mahone's falsetto on the track. "All I Ever Need" peaked at number 20 on the US Billboard Bubbling Under Hot 100 chart.

== Composition ==
"All I Ever Need" is a down-tempo pop ballad. The song was written by Austin Mahone and Robert Villanueva. Mahone also produced the track. According to Mahone, the song was written in his bathroom. He stated, "I was in my bathroom, and I wrote it in there, and I just got the idea and I just started writing. I write a lot of my songs in the bathroom. It's really strange, but whatever works, right?"

The song has been described as an R&B and ballad track.

== Critical reception ==
"All I Ever Need" was met with positive reviews from music critics. Jason Lipshutz of Billboard called the song, "a fairly standard, slickly produced pop ballad" that showcases Mahone's "earnest falsetto and remain unscathed in spite of the clumsy lyrics." John Walker of MTV compared the melody to the likes of Usher. Kristin Harris of Seventeen magazine stated that the track is, "the perfect ballad to listen to on repeat all summer long." Fuse TV remarked, "the most money part comes in the chorus as Mahone hits a slew of impressive falsetto notes that Justin Bieber would envy."

== Music video ==
The music video for "All I Ever Need" premiered via VEVO on May 23, 2014. The video is a tribute to his fans, that showcases Mahone standing in a theatre watching footage of his fans at shows across the globe and showing support for him and his music.

== Credits and personnel ==
Musicians

- Austin Mahone – primary artist, composer, producer

Production

- Robert Villanueva – composer
- Ian Mercel – recording engineer
- Perry Jimenez – recording engineer
- Gene Grimaldi – mastering engineer
- Stephen McDowell – mixing engineer
- Fabian Marasciullo – mixing engineer

== Charts ==
Chart performance for "All I Ever Need"
Chart (2014)	Peak position
US Bubbling Under Hot 100 (Billboard)	20
US Pop Digital Song Sales (Billboard)	27

== Certifications ==
Certifications for "All I Ever Need"
Region	Certification	Certified units/sales
New Zealand (RMNZ)	Gold	15,000^{‡}
United States (RIAA)	Gold	500,000^{‡}
^{‡} Sales+streaming figures based on certification alone.

== Release history ==
Release history for "All I Ever Need"
Region	Date	Format	Label	Ref.
Various	May 13, 2014	Digital download	Chase; Cash Money; Republic Records	
