= Mmm Yeah =

2014 single by Austin Mahone featuring Pitbull

Single by Austin Mahone featuring Pitbull

from the EP The Secret
- Released: January 26, 2014
- Recorded: 2013
- Genre: Dance-pop
- Length: 3:51
- Label: Chase; Cash Money; Republic
- Songwriters: Austin Mahone; Armando Pérez; Alex Schwartz; Joe Khajadourian; William Lobban-Bean; Ethan Lowery; Lamar Mahone; Keith Mayberry; Chase Lett; Craig Simpkins; Lidell Townsell
- Producers: The Futuristics; Cook Classics

Austin Mahone singles chronology
"Banga Banga" (2013)	"Mmm Yeah" (2014)	"Dirty Work" (2015)

Pitbull singles chronology
"I Love You... Te Quiero" (2014)	"Mmm Yeah" (2014)	"Wild Wild Love" (2014)

"Mmm Yeah" is a song by American pop singer Austin Mahone from his second EP The Secret. The song was released as the second and final single from the EP on January 26, 2014. The song features vocals from Cuban-American rapper Pitbull. The song was released in the United States as a digital download on January 26, 2014. The song's chorus samples the song "Nu Nu" by Lidell Townsell. The song peaked at number 49 on the Billboard Hot 100.

== Composition ==
"Mmm Yeah" is a dance-pop song which contains a "swirling" production, funk-influenced trumpets, a percussion-heavy four on the floor electropop beat, and influences of Chicago house, hip hop, and Latin music. It is written in the key of F♯ minor. The track heavily samples lyrics from Lidell Townsell's 1992 single "Nu Nu", especially in the chorus. Lyrically, the song speaks of being rejected by an attractive woman walking down a street: "We can do whatever/ Do whatever we want/ When she walked past me I said 'hey, hey, hey' So tell me where you from where you want to go/ She walked past me like I ain't say a word".

== Music video ==
The lyric video, directed by Rocco Valdes, Dan Roof and Tomás Whitmore, was released on January 31, 2014, and features appearances by Nash Grier, Cameron Dallas, Sam Pottorff, The Janoskians, Keira Knightley, Midnight Red, Stalker Sarah, King Bach, Teala Dunn, Madison Pettis, and Mahogany Lox. The lyric video was nominated at the 2014 MTV Video Music Awards in the "Best Lyric Video" category.

The official music video was released on March 13, 2014, featuring Pitbull. It was directed by Gil Green, who previously worked with Mahone for his "Banga! Banga!" music video. Throughout the video, Mahone and Pitbull are shown dancing with girls inside a moving room on a static floor with speakers and a couch, a concept reminiscent of the 1996 video for "Virtual Insanity" by Jamiroquai. This music video was certified in the digital platform Vevo on February 3, 2015, and it's Mahone's second Vevo Certified.

== Chart performance ==
"Mmm Yeah" debuted at number 60 on the Billboard Hot 100 on the week of February 8, 2014, and eventually peaked at number 49, resulting in the song becoming Mahone's highest-charting single on the chart, surpassing "What About Love". The song has also reached number 19 on the Billboard Pop Songs chart. On June 22, 2014, "Mmm Yeah" became Mahone's first single to enter the Australian Singles chart, entering at 32. It also reached number 1 on the Billboard Heatseeker Songs chart. The single was certified gold as expressed by Mahone on his official Twitter account on the 6th May 2014. The song sold 193,000 downloads according to Nielsen SoundScan as of March 2014.

== Track listing ==
Digital download
No.	Title	Length
1.	"Mmm Yeah" (feat. Pitbull)	3:51

Official Remixes
No.	Title	Length
1.	"Mmm Yeah (Jump Smokers Radio Edit)" (feat. Pitbull)	5:07
2.	"Mmm Yeah (Jump Smokers Club Mix)" (feat. Pitbull)	5:30

== Charts ==
=== Weekly charts ===
Weekly chart performance for "Mmm Yeah"
Chart (2014)	Peak position
Australia (ARIA)	32
Austria (Ö3 Austria Top 40)	57
Belgium (Ultratip Bubbling Under Flanders)	28
Belgium (Ultratip Bubbling Under Wallonia)	12
Canada Hot 100 (Billboard)	36
Finland (Suomen virallinen latauslista)	14
Germany (GfK)	72
Ireland (IRMA)	49
Italy (FIMI)	49
Japan (Hot 100 Airplay)	86
Latvia (EHR)	16
Mexico (Billboard Ingles Airplay)	26
Netherlands (Single Top 100)	48
Norway (VG-lista)	8
Scotland Singles (Official Charts)	48
Spain (Promusicae)	35
Switzerland (Schweizer Hitparade)	62
UK Singles (Official Charts Company)	34
US Billboard Hot 100	49
US Pop Airplay (Billboard)	19

=== Year-end charts ===
Year-end chart performance for "Mmm Yeah"
Chart (2014)	Position
Latvia (European Hit Radio)	100
US Pop Digital Song Sales (Billboard)	48

== Certifications ==
Region	Certification	Certified units/sales
Australia (ARIA)	Gold	35,000^{^}
United States (RIAA)	Platinum	1,000,000^{‡}
Streaming
Denmark (IFPI Danmark)	Platinum	2,600,000^{†}
^{^} Shipments figures based on certification alone.^{‡} Sales+streaming figures based on certification alone.^{†} Streaming-only figures based on certification alone.

== Release history ==
Region	Date	Format	Label
United States	January 26, 2014	Digital download	Chase, Cash Money, Republic Records
Australia	June 22, 2014	Digital download	Chase, Cash Money, Republic Records
