= So Good (Austin Mahone song) =

Single by Austin Mahone

from the album Oxygen
- Released: February 28, 2018
- Genre: Tropical
- Length: 2:53
- Label: A.M. Music
- Songwriters: Austin Mahone; Jose Garcia; Andy Love; Jimmy Paul Thornfeldt; Jorge Gomez; Robert Villanueva; Joevanny Astorga; Scott Stoddart; Obi Mhondera
- Producers: Mahone; Stoddart; Thornfeldt; IAmChino

Austin Mahone singles chronology
"Háblame Bajito" (2017)	"So Good" (2018)	"Why Don't We" (2019)

"So Good" is a song by American pop singer Austin Mahone. It was released on February 28, 2018, as the lead and only single from his fourth EP, Oxygen.

== Composition and recording ==
Austin Mahone revealed that the song came about after it was sent to him by his Japanese label. Mahone, who was in Los Angeles at the time, decided to change some of the lyrics and sent it back to his label, where it was mixed, mastered and completed. The song was written about conveying feelings to the person you have a crush on, encouraging from a male perspective to give modest women confidence.

"I've realized again that Japanese women are modest and I know that's what makes them great, but it seems that men are also quite shy. I heard that March is graduation season in Japan, so if you have someone you like, it'd be great if you could just go ahead and tell them how you feel."

Written by Austin Mahone, Jose Garcia, Andy Love, Jimmy Paul Thornfeldt, Jorge Gomez, Robert Villanueva, Joevanny Astorga, Scott Stoddart and Obi Mhondera, the track is described as an up-tempo love song. The track was produced by Mahone, Thornfeldt, Stoddart and IAmChino. The song was selected as the theme song for Japanese TV series Love Me Truly.

== Critical reception ==
Kazunari Honke of Billboard Japan wrote a positive review for the song, "It's undeniable that it goes against the flow of the times, but it's a colorful pop tune that seems likely to be well-received by young people in Japan." However, he felt that the song was "a bit like a rehash" of Justin Bieber's "Beauty and a Beat", but nonetheless, shows "a strong sense of service."

== Credits and personnel ==
Credits for "So Good" adapted from album's digital liner notes.

- Austin Mahone – vocals, composer, lyricist, producer
- Scott Stoddart – producer, composer, lyricist
- Jimmy Paul Thornfeldt – producer, composer, lyricist
- IAmChino – producer
- Jose Garcia – composer, lyricist
- Andy Love – composer, lyricist
- Jorge Gomez – composer, lyricist
- Robert Villanueva – composer, lyricist
- Joevanny Astorga – composer, lyricist
- Obi Mhondera – composer, lyricist

== Charts ==
Chart performance for "So Good"
Chart (2018)	Peak position
Japan (Japan Hot 100) (Billboard)	21

== Release history ==
Release dates for "So Good"
Region	Date	Format	Label	Ref.
United States	February 28, 2018	Digital download	A.M. Music	
Japan	February 28, 2018	Digital download	Universal Music Japan	
Various	February 26, 2021	Digital download	BMG	
