= A Lone Star Story =

Studio album by Austin Mahone
- Released: June 23, 2023
- Studio: The 808 Farm (Nashville, TN); Darkhorse Studio (Nashville, TN)
- Genre: Country
- Length: 46:41
- Label: A.M. Music
- Producer: Jim Jonsin

Austin Mahone chronology
Magic City (2021)	A Lone Star Story (2023)

Singles from A Lone Star Story
- 1. "Sundress" Released: October 21, 2022; 2. "Withdrawal" Released: February 24, 2023; 3. "Kuntry" Released: May 23, 2023; 4. "Cruise" Released: September 1, 2023

A Lone Star Story is the second studio album by American singer-songwriter Austin Mahone. It was released independently on June 23, 2023, via A.M. Music. The album spawned three singles: "Sundress", "Withdrawal", and "Kuntry" and marks a departure away from the teen pop, dance-pop, and R&B sound Mahone originally became known for in favor of a more country style sound.

== Background ==
Mahone began working on the album at the beginning of the COVID-19 pandemic. Mahone stated that the album has been "a long time coming." The album was recorded at the 808 Farm and Darkhorse Studio in Nashville, Tennessee and was produced by Jim Jonsin. The album title comes from him growing up in San Antonio, Texas.

== Composition ==
"I just wanted to do something that was more authentic and real to me, and something that would be different for everyone else. I would be pretty nervous [about going in a new direction] if it wasn't country music that I was meshing with. Because I grew up on country music, I feel very comfortable in that space, even though I've never done country music in my life before. It feels right."

The first single, "Sundress" is an acoustic track with R&B influences. The album also features up-tempo tracks "Dirty Martini", "Ride of My Life" and "Cruise". Other songs such as "Coming Home", "Holes in the Wall" and "Wings" showcase Mahone's vulnerable side. He stated that "Wings" was the most personal track off the album; "It explains the way I grew up. 'Wings' is just one of those special records that hits people in the heart."

== Release ==
"Sundress" was released on October 21, 2022, as the first single from the album. A music video for the song premiered on October 24.

"Withdrawal" was released as the album's second single on February 24, 2023. A music video for the song premiered the same day as the single's release.

"Kuntry" was released as the third single from the album on May 23, 2023. The music video for the song was released on June 5, 2023, and was filmed in his home state of Texas. The video describes Mahone's childhood, showcasing the things he likes to do with family and friends.

"Cruise" was released as the 4th and final single from the album on September 1, 2023 along with a music video.

== Critical reception ==
Peter Gonzaga of Front Row Features stated, "Mahone solidifies his status as a versatile and boundary-pushing artist, effortlessly blending genres and defying expectations."

== Track listing ==
All tracks are written by Austin Mahone.

No.	Title	Length
1.	"Coming Home"	2:34
2.	"Have You Seen Her"	3:04
3.	"She's Too Good"	2:30
4.	"Dirty Martini"	3:27
5.	"New Addiction"	2:57
6.	"Cruise"	2:55
7.	"Wings"	4:09
8.	"Kuntry"	2:30
9.	"Withdrawal"	4:03
10.	"You Make Me Feel"	2:48
11.	"Sundress"	2:22
12.	"Ride of My Life"	2:51
13.	"Druggie Music"	2:56
14.	"Holes in the Wall"	3:48
15.	"Feels Like Love"	3:47
Total length:		46:41

== Release history ==
Release dates and formats for A Lone Star Story
Region	Date	Format	Label	Ref.
Various	June 23, 2023	Digital download; streaming	A.M. Music	
