= Háblame Bajito =

Single by Abraham Mateo with 50 Cent and Austin Mahone

from the album A Cámara Lenta
- Released: December 8, 2017
- Recorded: 2017
- Genre: Urban
- Length: 4:30
- Label: Sony Music Spain
- Songwriters: Luis Angel O'Neill; Jumbo "El Que Produce Solo"; Edgar Barrera; Austin Mahone; 50 Cent; Jadan Andino; Armando Lozano Ojeda; Abraham Mateo
- Producers: Tainy; Jumbo; Max Borghetti; Mateo

Abraham Mateo singles chronology
"Loco Enamorado" (2017)	"Háblame Bajito" (2017)	"Mentirosa Compulsiva" (2018)

50 Cent singles chronology
"Still Think I'm Nothing" (2017)	"Háblame Bajito" (2017)	"Crazy" (2018)

Austin Mahone singles chronology
"Say Hi" (2017)	"Háblame Bajito" (2017)	"So Good" (2018)

Music video
- "Háblame Bajito" on YouTube

"Háblame Bajito" is a song by Spanish singer-songwriter Abraham Mateo with American rapper 50 Cent and American singer Austin Mahone. It was released on December 8, 2017, as the second single from Mateo's fifth studio album A Cámara Lenta.

== Background and composition ==
"Háblame Bajito" was written and produced by Abraham Mateo, as well as being co-written by O'Neill, Jumbo "El Que Produce Solo", Edgar Barrera, Austin Mahone and 50 Cent. The track was also co-produced by Tainy and Jumbo. Speaking about the track, Mateo stated,

"I feel proud of the result of so many hours of work in the studio and I am happy to see one more of my dreams fulfilled. I still can't believe that today I am collaborating with artists that I admired since my childhood in Andalusia."

About the collaboration, 50 Cent stated, "from the first time I heard it, I knew it would be a success," while Mahone added that the track can be something fans can relate to.

During the song's development, Mateo played "Háblame Bajito" for Bad Bunny after meeting him in a recording studio in Miami. According to himself, Bad Bunny declined the proposal to collaborate on the track, and Mateo later described the rejection as disappointing because he admired him as an artist.

== Critical reception ==
Los 40 described the track as, "A song that bets on urban sound. With a very catchy chorus, the song relies on bilingual lyrics that you won't be able to get out of your head."

== Music video ==
The music video for "Háblame Bajito" premiered on December 8, 2017. The video was filmed in Los Angeles and New York City. It was directed by Mike Ho and Jesse Terrero.

== Charts ==
Chart performance for "Háblame Bajito"
Chart (2017)	Peak position
Ecuador (National-Report)	73
Spain (PROMUSICAE)	57
US Latin Digital Song Sales (Billboard)	17
Venezuela (National-Report)	40

== Certifications ==
Region	Certification	Certified units/sales
Mexico (AMPROFON)	Platinum	60,000^{*}
Spain (Promusicae)	Gold	30,000^{‡}
United States (RIAA)	Platinum (Latin)	60,000^{‡}
^{*} Sales figures based on certification alone.^{‡} Sales+streaming figures based on certification alone.
