= Kalin and Myles =

American pop duo

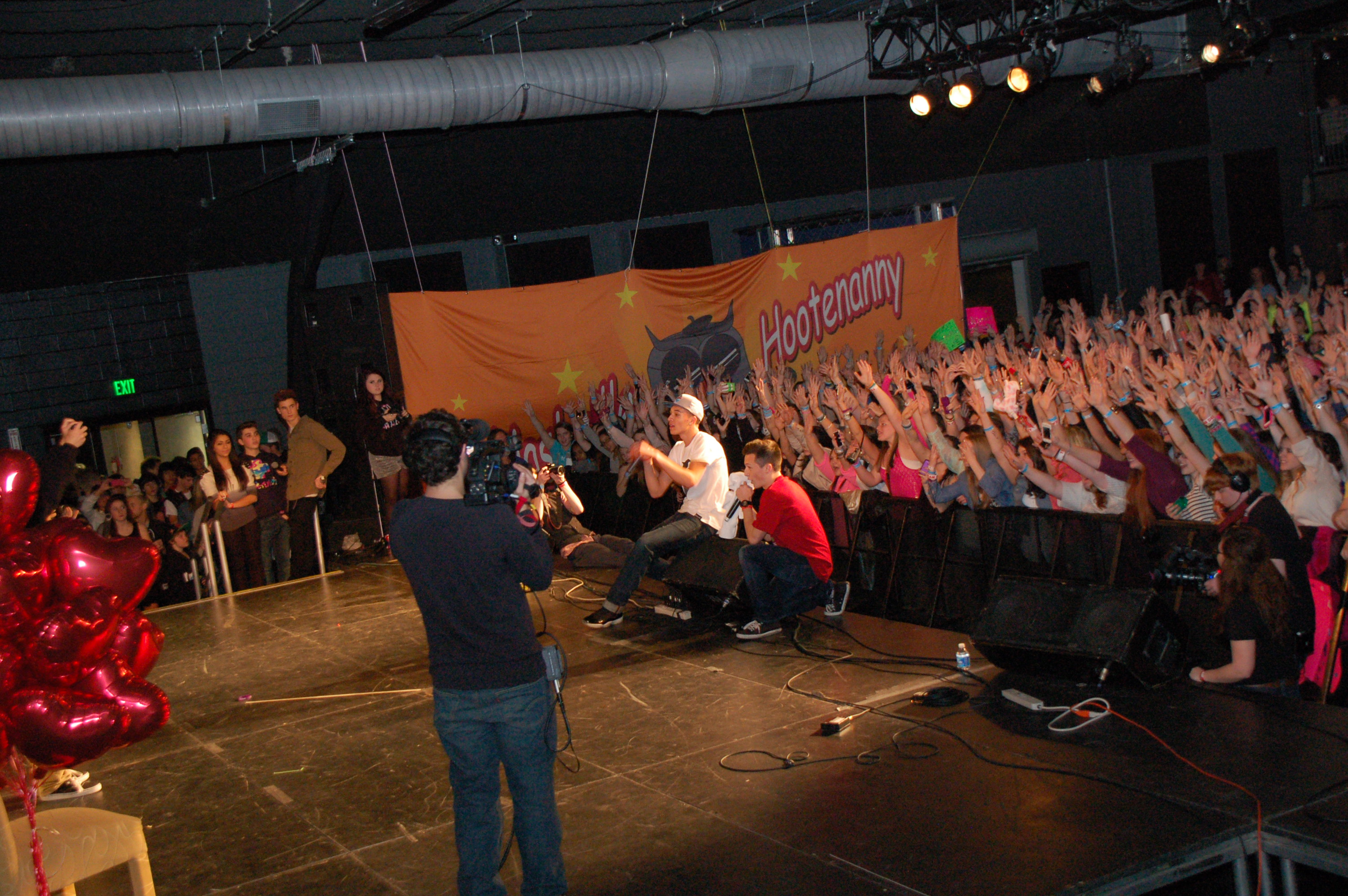
- Kalin and Myles performing in 2012

Background information
- Origin: Dublin, California, U.S.
- Genres: Hip-hop; R&B; Pop
- Years active: 2012–2016
- Labels: Republic
- Past members: Kalin White; Myles Parrish
- Website: kalinandmyles.com (Archived January 18, 2019)

Kalin and Myles were an American pop duo from the San Francisco Bay Area. They released their first self-titled album on November 20, 2015 and split up 4 months later on March 30, 2016.

== Career ==
Myles met Kalin at a house party in Dublin, California. "We had always known each other, and I would see him at hella functions", Myles said. They met for a second time at a movie showing of Justin Bieber: Never Say Never. Kalin reached out to Myles multiple times before they began making music together. Myles was quoted in an article saying the following

It was the premiere of "Never Say Never," and we both went to the movies. But that's not where we officially met for the first time – it's just where we finally crossed paths again. And I was like, "Hey – what's up? I've started to do some music!"

The two were working on their own music and production before they recorded their premiere song "More Than Friends" in 2011. After an enthusiastic response, their solo careers were put on hold, and the duo began uploading more videos together, including their breakout hit "Summertime Love." Shortly after meeting, they started making music together in Myles' bedroom. Social media then sparked their popularity. Myles says, "I was just like making beats in my room and I just had a microphone from Guitar Center that I got and he came over and we put out a song like that weekend and got a cool response and just thought, 'Yo, we should keep making more music.'"

The duo released their debut EP Chasing Dreams, in 2012. They then released their second EP K&M University, later that year (2012). They then released their third EP "Chase Dreams," in 2014. The EP entered at number 6 on the Rap Albums chart. The duo released their fourth EP, Dedication, in December 2014. They are going on a headlining tour in 2015 to support the EP. They also just released their self-titled debut album on November 20. In 2015, they were nominated for a Teen Choice Award in the category, "Choice Music: Next Big Thing", but lost to fellow competitor Bea Miller. The duo joined Timeflies on their Just For Fun Tour in June 2015, touring all over the East Coast and Midwest. While on this tour fans did notice a difference in the duo's performance from their last tour in 2015. There was a noticeable tension building between the two while performing. The duo now reside in Los Angeles, California.

The duo Kalin and Myles have split up on March 30, 2016. It was announced they will be taking a break and pursuing their own careers.

== Discography ==
- Chasing Dreams EP (September 2013)
- K&M University EP (December 2013)
- Chase Dreams EP (June 2014)
- Dedication EP (December 2014)
- Kalin and Myles Debut Album (November 2015)
