= Banga Banga (Austin Mahone song) =

"Banga! Banga!"

Single by Austin Mahone
- Released: November 10, 2013
- Recorded: 2013
- Genre: Pop
- Length: 3:15
- Label: Chase; Cash Money Records; Republic Records
- Songwriters: Austin Mahone; Sean Garrett; Menardini Timothee
- Producers: Sean Garrett; Bridgetown

Austin Mahone singles chronology
"What About Love" (2013)	"Banga! Banga!" (2013)	"Mmm Yeah" (2014)

Professional ratings
Review scores
Source	Rating
PopCrush	3/5 stars
Rolling Stone	3/5 stars

"Banga! Banga!" is a song by American singer Austin Mahone. The song features uncredited vocals by Sean Garrett who also co-wrote the song with Mahone and Menardini Timothee and co-produced it as well with Bridgetown. It was released as a single on November 10, 2013.

== Composition ==
In an interview to Rolling Stone Mahone commented about the song: "This single is a little bit [more] mature. I'm turning 18 in a couple of months, so I'm just trying to make music that's [more] maturing." On November 3, 2013, he tweeted the single cover. The song was labeled by the same source as "primary color-pop rap pinned".

== Music video ==
On November 6, 2013, Mahone announced that the official music video for the track was going to be shot the following week. It was premiered via Mahone's official VEVO channel on December 11, 2013, and directed by Gil Green.

== Live performances ==
Austin Mahone performed the song on the MTV Europe Music Awards on November 10, 2013 and the Nickelodeon HALO Awards on November 17, 2013.

== Track list ==
- Digital download
1. "Banga! Banga!" – 3:15

== Credits and personnel ==
- Lead vocals – Austin Mahone
- Lyrics – Austin Mahone, Sean Garrett, Menardini Timothee
- Engineer – Joshua Samuel
- Producers – Sean Garrett, Bridgetown
- Label: Chase, Cash Money Records

== Charts ==
Chart (2013)	Peak position
Belgium (Ultratop 50 Flanders)	35
US Pop Digital Song Sales (Billboard)	27

== Release history ==
Region	Date	Format	Label
United States	November 10, 2013	Digital download	Chase, Cash Money Records
Germany	November 15, 2013	Digital download	Chase, Cash Money Records
United Kingdom	November 15, 2013	Digital download	Chase, Cash Money Records
