= Austin Mahone =

American singer (born 1996)

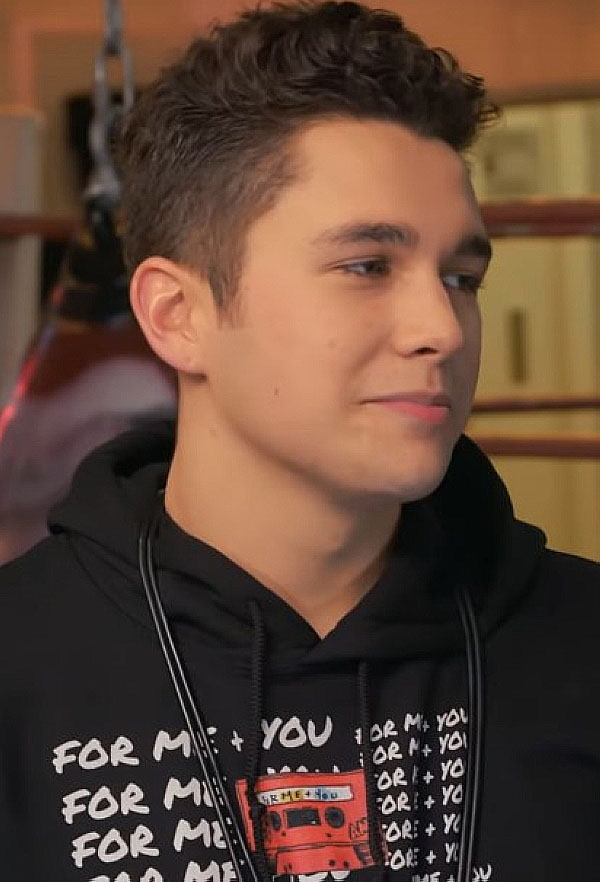
- Mahone in 2018

Background information
- Born: Austin Harris Mahone; April 4, 1996 (age 30); San Antonio, Texas, U.S.
- Genres: Pop; R&B; dance-pop
- Occupations: Singer; songwriter
- Instruments: Vocals; guitar; piano
- Works: Austin Mahone discography
- Years active: 2010–present
- Labels: Universal Music Japan; BMG; Mr. 305 Inc.; AM Music; Cash Money; Republic; Chase
- Website: austinmahone.com

Austin Harris Mahone (/məˈhoʊn/; born April 4, 1996) is an American singer. Born and raised in San Antonio, Texas, he gained initial recognition performing covers of pop songs on YouTube. He was discovered by record producers Rocco Did It Again! and Mike Blumstein in 2012, and subsequently signed with their label, Chase Records in a joint venture with Republic Records in June of that year. His 2012 debut single, "Say Somethin'" and its follow-up, "Say You're Just a Friend" (featuring Flo Rida) both received gold certifications by the Recording Industry Association of America (RIAA), while his 2013 single, "What About Love" did so and marked his first entry on the Billboard Hot 100. All three were included on his titularly-titled debut extended play (2013), which was released only in Japan. In September of that year, his recording contract entered a triple joint venture with Birdman's Cash Money Records, an imprint of Republic.

His 2014 single, "Mmm Yeah" (featuring Pitbull) received platinum certification by the RIAA and became his highest charting song on the Billboard Hot 100—at number 49. It served as lead single for his second extended play (EP) The Secret (2014), which peaked at number five on the Billboard 200. After the release of his 2015 single "Dirty Work", he parted ways with the labels in favor of Pitbull's Mr. 305 Inc. The song entered the Billboard Japan Hot 100 and received platinum certification by the Recording Industry Association of Japan (RIAJ), leading his debut studio album, Dirty Work – The Album (2017) to be released exclusively in the country—where it entered the Oricon Albums Chart. Preceded by a number of follow-up mixtapes and EPs, his second album, A Lone Star Story (2023) marked a full departure from pop in favor of country music.

== Early life ==
Austin Harris Mahone was born in San Antonio, Texas. His father died when he was a year and a half old, and he was raised as a Catholic by his single mother. Mahone is of English, French, German, and Slovak descent. He attended Lady Bird Johnson High School in San Antonio but left after his freshman year and was homeschooled at his grandmother's house.

== Career ==
=== 2010–2014: Extended Play and The Secret ===
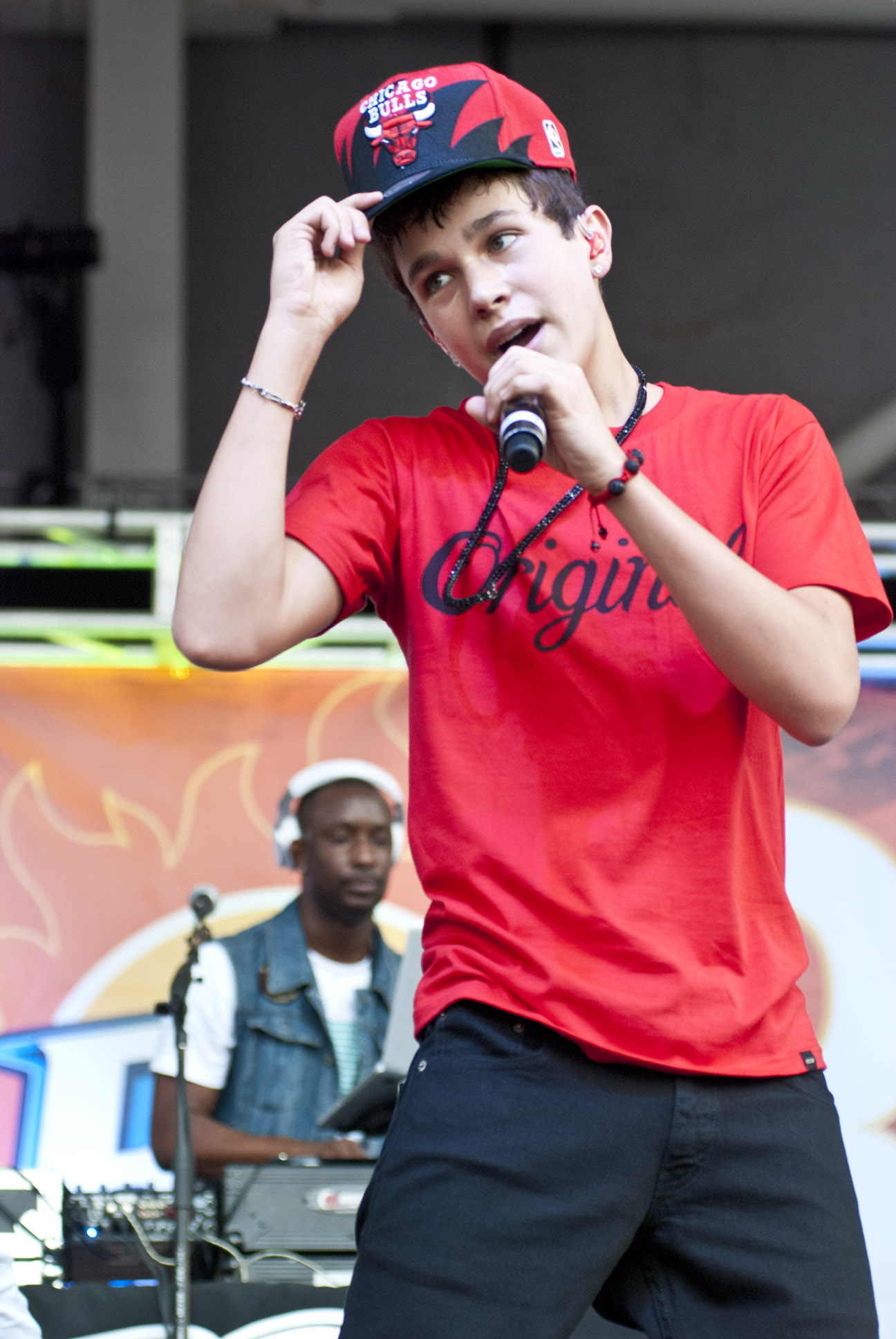
Mahone performing at the B96 Pepsi SummerBash in June 2012

Mahone began his career by posting videos on YouTube in June 2010. More music videos followed, and by January 2011 he began to build an online following. In October 2011, Mahone posted a video covering Justin Bieber's "Mistletoe". Mahone has cited Bieber as his inspiration. He has also cited musical influences from Chris Brown, T-Pain, Ne-Yo and Tim McGraw, among many others.

On February 14, 2012, Mahone independently released a single to iTunes, "11:11". The song reached number 19 on the US Heatseekers Songs chart. The song also sold 100,000 digital downloads. On June 5, he released his debut single, "Say Somethin". The song peaked at number 19 on the US Pop Airplay chart. He began receiving offers from record labels, most notably from Kara DioGuardi, who wanted to sign him to Warner Bros. Records. On August 28, Mahone announced that he had been officially signed to Chase/Republic Records. After he was signed, a music video was released for "Say Somethin" in September 2012. In November 2012, Mahone signed a deal to become the new "Teen Ambassador" for Lil Wayne's Trukfit fashion clothing line. He has filmed commercials for McDonald's and Hot Nuts, a Mexican snack. On December 3, Mahone released his second single, "Say You're Just a Friend" featuring rapper Flo Rida as a digital download. The song peaked at number four on the US Bubbling Under Hot 100 chart. A piano version of the song was later released. Despite positive responses from fans, Mahone saw comments about how they couldn't hear his voice, so he decided to change it up and released the piano version. In March 2013, he released a music video for the song, "Heart in My Hand", which he shot and produced himself. On May 29, 2013, he released his debut EP, Extended Play, in Japan only. The EP peaked at number 17 on the Japanese Albums chart. Mahone travelled to Japan in June 2013, to promote the EP's release and announced a three-date Japan tour for November 2013.

On June 10, Mahone released "What About Love" as the lead single from The Secret. The song earned him his first Billboard Hot 100 entry, peaking at number 66. The song was also certified gold by the Recording Industry Association of America. A music video was released and directed by Colin Tilley, where it won MTV's Artists to Watch at the MTV Video Music Awards. Mahone was also nominated at the 2013 Bravo Otto Awards for Breakout Artist of the Year. He was later chosen as one of the opening acts of Taylor Swift's Red Tour. In July 2013, Mahone featured in "Magik 2.0", a song by Becky G for The Smurfs 2 soundtrack. It was a rendition of B.o.B's "Magic". On October 17, he kicked off his first ever headlining tour, MTV's Artist to Watch Tour. On November 13, Mahone released a non-album single, "Banga Banga". In December 2013, Mahone was named a "Digital and Brand Strategist" for Aquafina's FlavorSplash, a new line of flavored sparkling water targeted towards teens.

"Mmm Yeah", featuring Pitbull was released on January 26, 2014, as the second single from The Secret. The song peaked at number 49 on the Billboard Hot 100 and was certified platinum by the RIAA. Two videos for the song was released, a lyric video on January 31, and the official music video on March 13. The first was nominated for Best Lyric Video at the 2014 MTV Video Music Awards. Ahead of Mahone the release of his second EP, promotional singles were released. "U" was released as the first promotional single on February 14. On April 18, "Till I Find You" was released as the EP's second promotional single. On May 13, the third promotional single "All I Ever Need" was released. The Secret was released in Europe on May 23. "Shadow" was released as the fourth promotional single on May 26, and on the following day, the EP was released in North America. The EP debuted at number five on the Billboard 200 with sales of 46,000 copies in its opening week. As of November 2014, it has sold 100,000 copies in the United States. On July 25, Mahone kicked off his second headlining tour, Austin Mahone: Live on Tour. A music video to "Secret" was released on September 24.

=== 2015–2018: This Is Not the Album and Dirty Work ===
During 2015, he continued to independently release music. Five new songs titled "Say My Name", "Places", "Waiting For This Love", "Someone Like You" and "Torture" were released for free download through his official SoundCloud page. Mahone starred in Becky G's music video for her song "Lovin' So Hard", whom he dated that time for five months. The video was released on May 6, 2015. On July 1, Mahone released "Dirty Work", the lead single from his upcoming debut album. In an interview with Billboard, he stated that the album would be released by the end of 2015. Mahone opened for Sekai no Owari at their Nissan Stadium concert in Japan in July 2015. On September 5, it was announced that he will be joining T.I. and Pia Mia in support of Jason Derulo on his Australian tour for three dates beginning on November 20.

In August 2015, he was picked as Elvis Duran's Artist of the Month and was featured on NBC's Today show broadcast nationally in the United States where he performed live his single "Dirty Work" after an interview with Hoda Kotb and temporary host Jenna Bush Hager. Over the course of September and October 2015, Mahone continued to independently release new music, with the tracks "Do It Right", "On Your Way", "Not Far" and "Put It On Me" being released for free download on his SoundCloud page. In an interview with Teen Vogue on November 13, 2015, Mahone announced that he would be releasing a free mixtape before the end of the year. On December 14, 2015, Mahone revealed the title of the mixtape, This Is Not the Album. He also revealed the cover art and announced that it would be released on December 17. In May 2016, Mahone became one of the faces of Macy's American Icons campaign. He released two singles in August 2016: "Send It" featuring Rich Homie Quan and "Way Up". Mahone released his second mixtape, titled ForMe+You on December 30.

On New Year's Eve, Mahone performed "Lady" on Pitbull's New Year's Revolution. "Lady" served as the lead single, a remix of the 2001 "Lady (Hear Me Tonight)" by Modjo, featuring Pitbull, was released on February 10, 2017. The song reached number one on Billboard's US Dance Club Songs chart. He made two appearances at the Dolce & Gabbana fashion shows in Italy. He performed two shows while on the Pitbull After Dark Cruise. In early 2017, Japanese comedian Blouson Chiemi started to use "Dirty Work" as the background music of her popular comedy routine, which ultimately became a sleeper hit in Japan. The song peaked at number four on the Japan Hot 100 and topped the Japan Hot Overseas chart. It also ending up being certified platinum in the country. In March 2017, he performed at POPSPRING Japan, which aired on TV in June. He began a campaign with Fossil in April 2017. On May 12, Mahone released a new song, Creatures of the Night, with DJ and record producer Hardwell. The song topped the US Dance Club Songs chart, becoming Mahone's second number-one. Mahone embarked on his third headlining tour, A Tour For Me + You, starting on May 31, to June 30. Mahone embarked on a Japan tour in July 2017, following the surprise success of "Dirty Work" in the country.

On September 13, 2017, Mahone announced his debut studio album, Dirty Work – The Album, which would be released exclusively in Japan. It was released on October 18, 2017, accompanied with the released of "Perfect Body". The song was featured in a commercial for the Japanese shampoo "Moist, Diane". It also included his collaborations "Lady" with Pitbull and "Creatures of the Night" with Hardwell. The album's release day, Mahone put out on digital platforms and streaming services two countdown songs internationally: "I Don't Believe You" and "Found You". The album peaked at number 34 on the Japanese Albums Chart. On December 8, he released the single "Háblame Bajito", a collaboration with Abraham Mateo and 50 Cent.

In support of the album's release, Mahone headlined a Japan tour in May and June 2018. On May 16, 2018, Mahone released his fourth extended play, Oxygen exclusively in Japan. "So Good" was released as the EP's lead single and peaked at number 21 on the Japan Hot 100.

=== 2019–present: A Lone Star Story ===
On February 4, 2019, Mahone released the single "Why Don't We", which is penned by Charlie Puth and categorized as a fusion of modern pop and old school R&B under the 90s' influences. The music video was released on March 2, on YouTube. Two other singles would follow, "Anxious" on April 4, and "Dancing with Nobody" on June 19. He performed in Japan in October 2019, with support from Travis Japan.

In October 2020, Mahone announced he was joining OnlyFans. He also released a new single called "Summer Love", on October 16, and which he previewed through OnlyFans. In November 2020, Mahone released "Miami", a collaboration with Mario Bautista & Lalo Ebratt. The single peaked at number 31 on the Mexico Airplay chart. On June 23, 2021, he streamed his fifth EP, Magic City on SoundCloud.

Mahone released the single, "Sundress" on October 21, 2022. In January 2023, Mahone collaborated with Fueled by 808, Kid Rock and Jimmie Allen on the single "No Limits". In February 2023, Mahone released the single "Withdrawal", which was produced by Jim Jonsin. On June 5, 2023, Mahone announced his new album, A Lone Star Story, which was released on June 23, 2023. Along with this announcement, he released the albums lead single, "Kuntry". In an interview with Billboard, Mahone shared, "I started [the album] at the beginning of the pandemic, so it's definitely been a long time coming [...] I grew up on country music, I feel very comfortable in that space, even though I've never done country music in my life before. It feels right." The album features previously released singles "Sundress" and "Withdrawal". Mahone released two new singles, "Sooner or Later" on September 27, 2024, and "Rearview" on March 21, 2025.

== Personal life ==
Mahone briefly dated American singer Camila Cabello in 2014. He dated Becky G in 2015, but the couple broke up in August 2015. He dated model Katya Elise Henry for less than a year. The two split in February 2017.

== Legal issues ==
On March 22, 2023, the U.S. Securities and Exchange Commission filed charges against Mahone, along with several other celebrities, for illegally promoting the securities of crypto companies. According to the SEC complaint, Mahone was paid approximately $20,000 in Bitcoin to tweet, "When $TRX hits 50 cents and $BTT hits 1 cent I'm getting a tattoo of @justinsuntron’s face."

== Discography ==
Studio albums

- Dirty Work – The Album (2017)
- A Lone Star Story (2023)

== Filmography ==
Television
Year	Title	Role	Notes
2013	Big Time Rush	Himself	"Big Time Dreams" (season 4, episode 12)
2014	The Millers	Adam (Teenage)	"Bahama Mama" (season 1, episode 16)
2014	Fashion Police	Himself	"Spring Fever" (season 9, episode 16)
2021	Nickelodeon's Unfiltered	Himself	Episode: "Poppin' Starfish & Rockin' Roaches!"

Web shows
Year	Title	Role	Notes
2012–2013	Austin Mahone Takeover	Himself	Web docu-series
2013–2014	Mahomie Madness	Himself / Judge	Web docu-series

== Concert tours ==
Headlining

- MTV Artist to Watch Tour (2013–14)
- Live on Tour (2014)
- A Tour For Me + You (2017)
- Oxygen Tour (2018)
- Japan Tour (2019)
- A Lone Star Story Tour (2024)

Opening act

- Taylor Swift – The Red Tour (2013)
- Bridgit Mendler – Summer Tour (2013)
- Jason Derulo – Jason Derulo Tour (2015)

== See also ==
- List of awards and nominations received by Austin Mahone
- List of YouTubers
