= Lidell Townsell =

- Origin: Chicago, Illinois, U.S.
- Genres: House, R&B
- Occupations: Producer, DJ
- Years active: 1987–present
- Labels: Mercury/PolyGram, Sights & Sounds

Willie Lidell Townsell is a house musician from Chicago, Illinois. He originally released numerous singles on the Trax and D.J. International labels. He released one album, Harmony, on Mercury/PolyGram Records as Lidell Townsell in 1992. Two singles from the album were hits in the US, "Get with U" and "Nu Nu"; the latter featured the duo M.T.F., whose members were singer Martell and emcee Silk E (no relation to Sylk-E. Fyne).

His music has influenced numerous artists including Tiger & Woods, and Green Velvet.

In 2014, he collaborated and also sang on Shit Robot's remix of his song "Do It (Right)".

== Discography ==
- Party People Jack Your Body (12") (Trax, 1987)
- Jack the House (Trax, 1988)
- Get The Hole (Trax, 1988)
- Nu Nu (Mercury/PolyGram, 1991)
- Step To It (Streetfire, 1992)
- Nu Nu / Summertime Summertime (12") (with K. Pompey) (ISBA, 1992)
- Harmony (with M.T.F.) (Mercury/PolyGram Records, 1992)
  - Engineered & Mixed by: Jerome Mark Mikulich at the Playroom Recording Studio (Chicago Heights, IL)
- All I Wanna Do (Aureus, 1997)
- Girls, Girls, Girls (Music Connection, Inc., 2000)
- Dance Dance (Everybody) (12") Featuring Consuela (Eclectik Recordings, 2001)
- King of the Party Records (Trax, 2004)
- Duh Duh Da (Trax, 2004)
- I'll Make U Dance (Square Roots, 2004)
- Lost Acid Tracks EP (Nu Soul, 2009)
- Do It (Right) Shit Robot Feat Lidell Townsell (DFA, 2014)
- Get The Hole (Trax, 2017)
- Power Bass / Step 2 It (12", W/Lbl) (Dangerous (US), Saber Records, UKN)
- Make Me Feel / Comin' Back / Nunu (12", Comp) (with Benassi Bros. / Bent) (SPG Music, UKN)

== Singles ==
Year	Title	Chart Positions			
Year	Title	Billboard Hot 100	US Hot Dance Music/Club Play	US Hot Dance Music/Maxi Singles	US Hot Hip-Hop & R&B Singles
1992	"Get with U"	#78	#4	#7	-
1992	"Nu Nu"	#26	#2	#1	#44
