= Dirty Work (Austin Mahone song) =

Single by Austin Mahone

from the album Dirty Work
- Released: July 1, 2015
- Recorded: 2015
- Length: 3:08
- Label: Chase; Cash Money; Republic; AM Music LLC; Mr. 305 Inc.; BMG; Universal Music Japan
- Songwriters: Austin Mahone; Sean Douglas; Talay Riley; Alexander Izquierdo; Stefan Johnson; Jordan Johnson; Marcus Lomax
- Producer: The Monsters and the Strangerz

Austin Mahone singles chronology
"Mmm Yeah" (2014)	"Dirty Work" (2015)	"Joy Ride" (2016)

Music video
- "Dirty Work" on YouTube

"Dirty Work" is a song by American pop singer Austin Mahone. The song was released in the United States as a digital download on July 1, 2015. It was written and produced by The Monsters and the Strangerz, with additional songwriting from Mahone, Sean Douglas and Talay Riley. From 2017, Japanese comedian Blouson Chiemi started to use the song as the background music in a popular comedy routine, which led to the song peaking on the Japan Hot 100 Chart at number 4. In October 2017, the song was certified Platinum in Japan.

== Background and release ==
In late June, Austin revealed the "Dirty Work" single artwork on Twitter, and announced that it would be released to iTunes on July 10, 2015. It was premiered on radio the next day, and given an early iTunes release on July 1, 2015.

On November 17, 2015, Mahone released a "Dirty Work" remix featuring T-Pain for free on his official SoundCloud page. In 2017, "Dirty Work" became a sleeper hit in Japan after comedienne Blouson Chiemi began using it in her "Career Woman" comedy routine. After seeing her comedy routine, Mahone offered to collaborate with her, and a "Dirty Work" remix featuring Blouson Chiemi was released on iTunes on June 8, 2017. The song was featured in a commercial for NTT Docomo. The single was released as a CD in Japan on July 19, which includes two remixes of the song.

== Composition ==
"Dirty Work" is a "bouncy, funky jam" that Mahone describes as having "a Bruno Mars / "Uptown Funk" type of vibe."

== Critical reception ==
The song received positive reviews. Jason Lipshutz of Billboard called it Mahone's "best and most ambitious single to date". Mike Wass of Idolator called it a 'retro-leaning banger' and likened it to hits by Bruno Mars and Justin Timberlake, while Fuse's Jeff Benjamin wrote "At times the guitars sound a bit like the ones in Michael Jackson's "Black or White."

== Chart performance ==
"Dirty Work" was met with low chart success on its initial release, only reaching number 28 on the US Pop Digital Song Sales chart, number 21 on the Underbubling Charts and number 30 on the Mexico Ingles Airplay chart. However, in 2017, the song topped the Japan Hot Overseas chart. The song spent 15 weeks at number-one on the chart, as well as peaked at number four on the Japan Hot 100. In October 2017, the song was certified Platinum in Japan.

== Music video ==
The music video for "Dirty Work" was filmed in April, 2015. Mahone stated in an interview with WiLD 94.9 that the video would be in black and white. However, Mahone later re-shot the video with an entirely new concept, and this original version of the video was never released.

In early July, Mahone filmed a second video for the song, inspired by the American TV version of The Office. This version of the video was released on July 27, 2015. In it, Mahone plays the office heart-throb, who is pursuing the sexy new girl. It includes a cast of fellow workers, who goof around and dance with Mahone throughout the video, with The Office style interviews to camera inter-cut throughout.

== Track listing and formats ==
- Digital download and streaming
1. "Dirty Work" – 3:07
- Digital download and streaming (Blouson Chiemi Remix)
1. "Dirty Work" (Blouson Chiemi Remix) - 2:56
- Dirty Work (+Remix)
1. "Dirty Work" - 3:09
2. "Dirty Work" (Bon Dance Remix) - 3:47
3. "Dirty Work" (EDM Remix) - 3:52
4. "Dirty Work" (Instrumental) - 3:08

== Charts ==
=== Weekly charts ===
Weekly chart performance for "Dirty Work"
Chart (2015–2017)	Peak position
Billboard Social 50	10
Billboard Twitter Real-Time	1
Japan Hot 100 (Billboard)	4
Japan (Oricon) (Dirty Work (+Remix))	23
Mexico Ingles Airplay (Billboard)	30
US Pop Digital Song Sales (Billboard)	28
US Bubbling Under Hot 100 (Billboard)	21

=== Year-end charts ===
Year-end chart performance for "Dirty Work"
Chart (2017)	Peak position
Japan (Japan Hot 100)	11
Japan (Japan Hot Overseas)	2

== Certifications ==
Region	Certification	Certified units/sales
Japan (RIAJ)	Platinum	250,000^{*}
^{*} Sales figures based on certification alone.

== Release history ==
Release dates for "Dirty Work"
Region	Date	Format	Label	Ref.
United States	July 1, 2015	Digital download	Chase; Cash Money; Republic	
Various	July 2, 2015	Digital download	Chase; Cash Money; Republic	
United States	July 14, 2015	Mainstream radio	Chase; Cash Money; Republic	
United Kingdom	July 24, 2015	Digital download	Chase; Cash Money; Republic	
Japan	June 8, 2017	Digital download (Blouson Chiemi Remix)	Universal	
Japan	July 19, 2017	CD (Remixes)	Universal	
Japan	August 11, 2017	Digital download (Remixes)	Universal	
