= Dirty Work – The Album =

Studio album by Austin Mahone
- Released: October 18, 2017
- Length: 43:29
- Label: AM Music; Mr. 305
- Producer: DJ White Shadow; Her0ism; Hardwell; Jaysounds; Jimmy Joker; Kronic; Maejor; The Monsters and the Strangerz; Polow Da Don; Jerome Price; Harmony Samuels; Sam Sumser; Skit; Brad Tallman; Richard Vission

Austin Mahone chronology
Dirty Work (2017)	Dirty Work – The Album (2017)	Oxygen (2018)

Singles from Dirty Work
- 1. "Dirty Work" Released: July 1, 2015; 2. "Lady" Released: February 11, 2017; 3. "Creatures of the Night" Released: May 12, 2017

Dirty Work – The Album is the debut studio album by American singer-songwriter Austin Mahone. The album was released on October 18, 2017, by AM Music and Mr. 305 Inc. through Universal Music Japan and was only released in Japan. The album features guest appearances from Bobby Biscayne, Juicy J, Pitbull, 2 Chainz and Hardwell.

== Background and promotion ==
Since 2017, Japanese comedian Blouson Chiemi started to use "Dirty Work" as the background music of her popular comedy routine, which led the song to peak number four on the Japan Hot 100 chart. The song was certified platinum in the country. Mahone embarked on a Japan tour in July 2017, following the surprise success of the song in the country. Later, Mahone announced the release of his debut studio album exclusively in Japan. It also included his collaborations "Lady" with Pitbull and "Creatures of the Night" with Hardwell which reached the number one position on the US Billboard Dance Club Songs chart.

Mahone released a new track, "Perfect Beauty" on September 20, 2017, featuring Bobby Biscayne. The song and its music video were released exclusively in Japan. It reached number 73 on the Japan Hot 100. The song was also featured in a commercial for the Japanese shampoo "Moist, Diane." On the album's release day, Mahone put out on digital platforms and streaming services two countdown songs internationally: "I Don't Believe You" and "Found You". In support of the album's release, Mahone headlined a Japan tour in May and June 2018.

== Track listing ==
Digital download
No.	Title	Writer(s)	Producer(s)	Length
1.	"Dirty Work"	Austin Mahone; Sean Douglas; Talay Riley; Alexander Izquierdo; Stefan Johnson; Jordan Johnson; Marcus Lomax	The Monsters and the Strangerz	3:08
2.	"I Don't Believe You"	Mahone; Jose Garcia; Jimmy Joker; Jorge Gomez; Robert Villanueva; Joevanny Astorga	Jimmy Joker	3:02
3.	"Perfect Beauty" (featuring Bobby Biscayne)	Mahone; Her0ism; Shane Facchinello; Nate Jolley; Jimmy Joker; Garcia; Gomez; Villanueva; Astorga	Her0ism; Jimmy Joker	3:21
4.	"Found You"	Mahone; Harmony Samuels; Edgar Etienne	Samuels	3:08
5.	"Love at Night" (featuring Juicy J)	Kesia Hollins; Jamal Jones; Jonathan Solone-Myvett	Polow Da Don	3:06
6.	"Pretty & Young"	Mahone; Luke Calleja; George Bechara; Leon Thomas III; James Saaib; Sean Kantrowitz; Kyle Van Riper	Kronic; Jaysounds	3:05
7.	"Lady" (featuring Pitbull)	Mahone; Brandon Green; Armando Perez; Jerome Price; Mounhim Mustapha; Yann Destagnol; Romain Tranchart; Bernard Edwards; Nile Rodgers	Price; Maejor	3:31
8.	"Better with You"	Mahone; Paul Blair; Joleen Beelle; Villanueva; Drew Scott	DJ White Shadow	3:54
9.	"Double Up"	Mahone; Blair; Grant Nelson; Villanueva	DJ White Shadow	3:15
10.	"Wait Around"	Mahone; Brad Tallman; Villanueva	Tallman	4:14
11.	"Except for Us"	Mahone; Richard Gonzalez; Skyler Stonestreet; Loreen More; Sasha Sloan	Richard Vission	2:51
12.	"Shake It for Me" (featuring 2 Chainz)	Mahone; Theron Thomas; Timothy Thomas; Tauheed Epps; Sam Sumser; Sean Small	Sumser	3:54
13.	"Creatures of the Night" (with Hardwell)	Austin Mahone; Robert van de Corput; Conor Patton; Sam Gray; Benjamin David Hemsley; Stevce Manovski	Hardwell	3:00
Total length:				43:29

Regular physical edition bonus track
No.	Title	Writer(s)	Producer(s)	Length
14.	"Dirty Work" (Skit Remix)	Mahone; Douglas; Riley; Izquierdo; S. Johnson; J. Johnson; Lomax	The Monsters and the Strangerz; Skit	2:25

Physical deluxe edition DVD
No.	Title	Length
1.	"Dirty Work" (music video)	5:11
2.	"Lady" (music video)	4:46
3.	"Better with You" (music video)	4:42
4.	"Dirty Work" (live from PopSpring 2017; music video)
5.	"Message to the Fans in Japan" (日本のファンへのメッセージ 一部、収録内容が変更になる場合がございます)

== Charts ==
Chart performance for Dirty Work – The Album
Chart (2017)	Peak position
Japanese Albums (Oricon)	34

== Release history ==
Release formats for Dirty Work – The Album
Region	Date	Format(s)	Label	Ref.
Japan	October 18, 2017	CD; CD+DVD	AM Music; Mr. 305	
