= Chiemi Blouson =

Japanese comedian

Shiori Fujiwara
- 藤原史織
- Born: 3 August 1990 (age 35); Okayama, Okayama Prefecture
- Education: Shimane University Faculty of Education (rusticated)
- Occupation: Comedian
- Years active: 2015–
- Agent: Watanabe Entertainment
- Style: Mandan; conte
- Height: 155 cm (5 ft 1 in)
- Website: Official profile

Shiori Fujiwara (born 3 August 1990), formerly known by her old stage name Chiemi Blouson, is a Japanese comedian formerly represented by Watanabe Entertainment.

== Biography ==
=== 2020 hiatus ===
On 18 March 2020, Fujiwara suddenly announced that she would be leaving Watanabe Entertainment and dropping her "Chiemi Blouson" stage name, citing a "private matter." In subsequent interviews, she expressed a desire to study abroad in Italy and make a series of YouTube videos about her experiences.

== Filmography ==
=== Television ===
==== Entertainment shows ====
Year	Title	Network	Ref.
2016	Pachi Fun!	TV Aichi, NBS, TV Saitama, CTC, Sun TV, Gunma TV, Tochi Tele, MTV, HAB, BBC	
2016	Atarashī Nami 24	Fuji TV	
2017	Guruguru Ninety Nine	NTV	
2017	Gyōretsu no dekiru Hōritsusōdansho	NTV	
2017	Ame-talk	TV Asahi	
2017	Chō Hamaru! Bakushō Character Parade	Fuji TV	
2017	Sakurai-Ariyoshi The Yakai	TBS	
2017	Shabekuri 007	NTV	
2017	Konya kurabete mimashita	NTV	
2017	R-1 Grand Prix	KTV	
2017	Pon!	NTV	

Theatrical animation

Year	Title	Role	Source
2018	Yo-kai Watch: Forever Friends	Tamamo	

==== Dramas ====
Year	Title	Role	Network	Ref.
2017	It's All About the Looks	Seira Sato	Fuji TV	
