= What About Love (Austin Mahone song) =

Single by Austin Mahone

from the EP The Secret
- Released: June 10, 2013
- Recorded: 2013
- Studio: Hit Factory Criteria (Miami)
- Genre: Pop; electropop; industrial pop
- Length: 3:23
- Label: Chase; Republic
- Songwriters: Austin Mahone; Nadir Khayat; Mohombi; Achraf Janussi; Bilal Hajji; Jimmy Joker; Rivington Starchild
- Producers: RedOne; Jimmy Joker

Austin Mahone singles chronology
"Say You're Just a Friend" (2012)	"What About Love" (2013)	"Banga Banga" (2013)

"What About Love" is a song by American singer Austin Mahone from his second EP, The Secret (2014). The song was released as the lead single from the EP on June 10, 2013. The song was written by Mahone, Nadir Khayat, Mohombi, Achraf Janussi, Bilal Hajji, Jimmy "Jimmy Joker" Thörnfeldt, and Gary "Rivington Starchild" Angulo. "What About Love" peaked at number 66 on the Billboard Hot 100 and was certified Gold by the Recording Industry Association of America (RIAA), denoting sales of over 500,000 copies in the United States. It received similar chart prominence in Canada, reaching number 67 on the Canadian Hot 100. The song's accompanying music video was directed by Colin Tilley.

== Composition ==
The song was written by Mahone, Nadir Khayat, Mohombi, Achraf Janussi, Bilal Hajji, Jimmy "Jimmy Joker" Thörnfeldt, and Gary "Rivington Starchild" Angulo while production was handled by RedOne and Jimmy Joker. Mahone explained the concept of the song with Live from MTV stating, "The song is about me being in this relationship with a girl and something happened along the way. It's like, 'What about all our promises? What about everything we did? I guess it doesn't matter anymore.'" The song contains influences of the "'90s boy-band era with a style reminiscent to that of the Backstreet Boys or NSYNC."

== Commercial performance ==
"What About Love" debuted on the Billboard Hot 100 at number 74 the week of June 29, 2013. Five weeks later, it peaked at number 66 and stayed on the chart for nine weeks. By January 2014, the song sold 374,000 digital downloads according to Nielsen Soundscan. On August 4, 2014, the song was certified gold by the Recording Industry Association of America (RIAA), denoting sales of over 500,000 units in that country. In Canada, the track debuted and peaked at number 67 on the Canadian Hot 100 the week it debuted on the Billboard Hot 100, and remained on the chart for five weeks.

== Music video ==
The music video was directed by Colin Tilley. Visual effects were created by GloriaFX. This music video was Mahone's first to be certified in the digital platform Vevo on January 1, 2015, which means that it was his first clip to receive over 100 million views on that platform. It was filmed in Hollywood Beach, Florida. Some scenes were taken in a known motel named "Diane". The video gave Mahone the Artist to Watch Award at the 2013 MTV Video Music Awards.

== Track listing ==
- Digital download
1. "What About Love" – 3:23

== Credits and personnel ==
Personnel

- Austin Mahone – lead vocals, songwriter
- Nadir Khayat – producer, songwriter, background vocals, additional programming, vocal arrangement
- Jimmy "Jimmy Joker" Thörnfeldt – producer, songwriter, background vocals, additional programming
- Mohombi – songwriter, background vocals
- Ameerah Roelants – background vocals
- Bilal Hajji – songwriter
- Gary "Rivington Starchild" Angulo – songwriter
- Achraf Janussi – songwriter, mixing engineer, vocal arrangement
- Jordan Sapp – mixing engineer, vocal arrangement
- Trevor Muzzy – mixing

Recording

- Recorded at The Hit Factory, Miami, Florida

== Charts ==
Chart performance for "What About Love"
Chart (2013–14)	Peak position
Belgium (Ultratip Bubbling Under Flanders)	7
Canada Hot 100 (Billboard)	67
CIS Airplay (TopHit)	106
France (SNEP)	117
Ireland (IRMA)	71
Japan (Dance Hits 20)	7
Mexican Anglo Chart (Monitor Latino)	20
Netherlands (Single Top 100)	44
Russia Airplay (Tophit)	118
Scottish Singles Sales (Official Charts)	81
UK Singles (OCC)	83
US Billboard Hot 100	66
US Pop Airplay (Billboard)	18

== Certifications ==
Certifications and sales for "What About Love"
Region	Certification	Certified units/sales
Brazil (Pro-Música Brasil)	Gold	30,000^{‡}
United States (RIAA)	Gold	500,000^{‡}
^{‡} Sales+streaming figures based on certification alone.

== Release history ==
Release dates and formats for "What About Love"
Region	Date	Format	Label	Ref.
United States	June 10, 2013	Digital download	Chase, Republic Records	
United States	June 11, 2013	Mainstream airplay	Chase, Republic Records	
Germany	June 11, 2013	CD single	Universal Music	
