= Maejor discography =

- Studio albums: 1
- Extended plays: 2
- Singles: 11
- Music videos: 20
- Mixtapes: 4

The discography of Maejor, formerly known as Bei Maejor and later Maejor Ali, an American hip hop and R&B music producer and singer-songwriter, consists of one studio album, two extended plays (EPs), four mixtapes, 15 singles (including three as a featured artist) and 20 music videos.

== Studio albums ==
List of studio albums, with selected details
Title	Details
Vol 1: Frequency	Released: May 1, 2020; Label: Virgin EMI Records; Formats: CD, digital download, streaming
Vol 1.1: Frequency	Released: April 2, 2021; Label: Virgin EMI Records; Formats: Digital download, streaming

== EPs ==
List of extended plays, with selected details
Title	Details
Upscale	Released: March 29, 2012; Label: Self-released; Formats: Digital download
Spirit	Released: November 1, 2014; Label: Self-released; Formats: Digital download

== Mixtapes ==
List of mixtapes, with year released
Title	Album details
ǝpısdn uʍop	Released: August 4, 2010; Label: Self-released; Format: Digital download
ǝpısdn uʍop Vol. 2	Released: November 26, 2010; Label: Self-released; Format: Digital download
Throwback	Released: March 11, 2011; Label: Self-released; Format: Digital download
maejorMaejor	Released: September 12, 2011; Label: Self-released; Format: Digital download

== Singles ==
=== As lead artist ===
List of singles, with selected chart positions, showing year released and album name
Title	Year	Peak chart positions										Album
Title	Year	US	US R&B	AUS	BEL (FL)	CAN	DEN	FRA	NLD	SWE	UK	Album
"Trouble" (featuring J. Cole)	2011	—	34	—	—	—	—	—	—	—	—	Non-album singles
"Lights Down Low" (featuring Waka Flocka Flame)	2012	—	68	—	—	—	—	—	—	—	—	Non-album singles
"Lolly" (featuring Juicy J and Justin Bieber)	2013	19	4	118	43	27	8	119	68	57	56	Non-album singles
"Me and My Team" (featuring Trey Songz and Kid Ink)	2014	—	—	—	—	—	—	—	—	—	—	Non-album singles
"Tell Daddy" (featuring Ying Yang Twins and Waka Flocka Flame)	2014	—	—	—	—	—	—	—	—	—	—	Non-album singles
"Get You Alone" (featuring Jeremih)	2015	—	—	—	—	—	—	—	—	—	—	Non-album singles
"Rich!"	2015	—	—	—	—	—	—	—	—	—	—	Non-album singles
"Me and You"	2015	—	—	—	—	—	—	—	—	—	—	Non-album singles
"Noir"	2016	—	—	—	—	—	—	—	—	—	—	Non-album singles
"Vibrations"	2017	—	—	—	—	—	—	—	—	—	—	Non-album singles
"Dance"	2017	—	—	—	—	—	—	—	—	—	—	Non-album singles
"Intuition"	2017	—	—	—	—	—	—	—	—	—	—	Non-album singles
"Vai Malandra" (with Anitta and MC Zaac featuring Tropkillaz and DJ Yuri Martins)	2017	—	—	—	—	—	—	—	—	—	—	Non-album singles
"Rebeca" (with MC Livinho and Gerek)	2018	—	—	—	—	—	—	—	—	—	—	Non-album singles
"OMG" (with Ludmilla and BIA)	2018	—	—	—	—	—	—	—	—	—	—	Non-album singles
"I Love You" (with Greeicy)	2019	—	—	—	—	—	—	86	—	—	—	Non-album singles
"—" denotes a recording that did not chart or was not released in that territory.

=== As featured artist ===
List of featured songs and singles, with selected chart positions and album name
Title	Year	Peak chart positions		Album
Title	Year	US	US R&B	Album
"She Got It Made" (Plies featuring Bei Maejor)	2010	103	30	Goon Affiliated
"Ride (Bei Maejor Remix)" (Ciara featuring André 3000, Ludacris and Bei Maejor)	2010	—	—	non-album singles
"Birthday Girl" (Travis Porter featuring Bei Maejor)	2011	—	—	non-album singles
"Meu Baile" (DJ Papato featuring Ludmilla & Maejor)	2018	—	—	non-album singles
"—" denotes a recording that did not chart or was not released in that territory.

== Guest appearances ==
List of non-single guest appearances, with other performing artists, showing year released and album name
Title	Year	Other artist(s)	Album
"Great Expectations"	2010	Diggy Simmons	Airborne
"So Addicted"	2010	Tinie Tempah	Disc-Overy
"I Wish"	2011	Nelly	O.E.MO
"They Call Me (Ride to This)"	2011	Mike Posner	The Layover
"Start Me Up"	2011	New Boyz	Too Cool to Care
"Radio"	2011	Hot Chelle Rae	Whatever
"Center Of The Stage"	2011	T-Pain, R. Kelly	Revolver
"What It Is"	2012	blackbear, Mike Posner	Sex the Mixtape
"Magazine Cover"	2012	Jae Millz	The Virgo Part 4: How Nasty Can He Get
"Need a Reason"	2012	Kelly Rowland, Future	Think Like a Man
"I Don't Care"	2014	Kid Ink	My Own Lane
"Help"	2014	blackbear	Help
"Am I Wrong"	2016	Berner	Hempire
"All on Me"	2017	Mally Mall, O.T. Genasis	Mally's World, Vol. 1
"Let Me Be the One”	2020	Iza	

== Songwriter credits ==
List of songs and singles written by Maejor
Title	Year	Artist(s)	Album
"About You"	2014	Trey Songz	Trigga
"Hello World"	2013	Diggy Simmons	Unexpected Arrival
"Only One"	2013	Sammy Adams	Non-album singles
"Summertime"	2013	Sammy Adams	Non-album singles
"Millionaire Misfits	2013	Iggy Azalea	Glory
"Murda Bizness"	2013	Iggy Azalea	Glory
"Say Somethin"	2013	Austin Mahone	Non-album single
"Love Me Like You Do"	2013	Justin Bieber	Believe
"One Love"	2013	Justin Bieber	Believe
"Windows Down"	2013	Big Time Rush	Non-album single
"Check Me Out"	2013	Trey Songz	Chapter V
"So Addicted"	2011	Tinie Tempah	Disc-Overy US Edition
"Radio"	2011	Hot Chelle Rae	Whatever
"Cupid"	2011	Lloyd	King of Hearts
"Naked"	2011	Lloyd	King of Hearts
"Feel It"	2010	Three 6 Mafia	Laws of Power
"Iyiyi"	2010	Cody Simpson	4 U
"She Got It Made"	2010	Plies	Goon Affiliated
"Great Expectations"	2010	Diggy Simmons	Airborne
"Speakers Going Hammer"	2010	Soulja Boy	The DeAndre Way
"Blowing Me Kisses"	2010	Soulja Boy	The DeAndre Way
"On My Own"	2009	Chrisette Michele	Epiphany
"Black Roses"	2009	Trey Songz	Ready
"Good Girls Like Bad Boys"	2009	Jadyn Maria	Non-album single

== Releases under an alias ==
=== As Area21 (with Martin Garrix) ===
Title	Year	Album
"Spaceships"	2016	Non-album singles
"Girls"	2016	Non-album singles
"We Did It"	2017	Non-album singles
"Glad You Came"	2017	Non-album singles
"Happy"	2018	Non-album singles
"Help"	2019	Non-album singles
"La La La"	2021	Greatest Hits Vol. 1
"Pogo"	2021	Greatest Hits Vol. 1
"Mona Lisa"	2021	Greatest Hits Vol. 1
"Lovin' Every Minute"	2021	Greatest Hits Vol. 1
"Followers"	2021	Greatest Hits Vol. 1
"Own the Night"	2021	Greatest Hits Vol. 1

== See also ==
- Maejor filmography
- Maejor production discography
