= Maejor production discography =

The following list is a discography of production by American hip hop and R&B music producer and recording artist, Maejor (formerly Bei Maejor and Maejor Ali). It includes a list of songs produced, co-produced and remixed by year, album, artist and title.

== Singles produced ==
List of singles as either producer or co-producer, with selected chart positions and certifications, showing year released, performing artists and album name
Title	Year	Peak chart positions										Certifications	Album
Title	Year	US	US R&B	AUS	BEL (FL)	CAN	DEN	FRA	NLD	SWE	UK	Certifications	Album
"Not Anymore" (Letoya)	2009	107	18	—	—	—	—	—	—	—	—		Lady Love
"Good Girls Like Bad Boys" (Jadyn Maria featuring Flo Rida)	2009	—	—	—	—	—	—	—	—	—	—		—N/a
"Drunk in the Club" (Bei Maejor)	2010	—	—	—	—	—	—	—	—	—	—		non-album singles
"Ride (Bei Maejor Remix)" (Ciara featuring André 3000, Ludacris and Bei Maejor)	2010	—	—	—	—	—	—	—	—	—	—		non-album singles
"Blowing Me Kisses" (Soulja Boy featuring Bei Maejor)	2010	—	58	—	—	—	—	—	—	—	—		The DeAndre Way
"Birthday Girl" (Travis Porter featuring Bei Maejor)	2011	—	—	—	—	—	—	—	—	—	—		non-album singles
"Trouble" (Bei Maejor featuring J. Cole)	2011	124	34	—	—	—	—	—	—	—	—		non-album singles
"Sexy Lil Somthin" (Young Beebe featuring Bei Maejor)	2012	—	—	—	—	—	—	—	—	—	—		non-album singles
"Windows Down" (Big Time Rush)	2012	97	—	—	—	—	—	—	—	—	—		Elevate
"Murda Bizness" (Iggy Azalea featuring T.I.)	2012	—	—	—	—	—	—	—	—	—	—		Glory
"Lights Down Low" (Bei Maejor featuring Waka Flocka Flame)	2012	—	68	—	—	—	—	—	—	—	—		non-album singles
"Lolly" (Maejor Ali featuring Juicy J and Justin Bieber)	2013	19	4	118	43	27	8	119	68	57	56		non-album singles
"Heartbreaker" (Justin Bieber)	2013	13	—	30	8	15	1	26	21	47	14		Journals
"Wait for a Minute" (Tyga featuring Justin Bieber)	2013	68	24	50	34	6	—	—	31	43	41		—N/a
"Me and My Team" (Maejor Ali featuring Trey Songz and Kid Ink)	2014	115	—	—	—	—	—	—	—	—	—		non-album singles
"Tell Daddy" (Maejor featuring Ying Yang Twins and Waka Flocka Flame)	2014	—	—	—	—	—	—	—	—	—	—		non-album singles
"Can't Trust Thots" (Wash featuring French Montana)	2014	—	—	—	—	—	—	—	—	—	—		non-album singles
"Get You Alone" (Maejor featuring Jeremih)	2015	—	—	—	—	—	—	—	—	—	—		TBA
"—" denotes a recording that did not chart or was not released in that territory.

== 2005 ==
=== Bun B - Trill ===
- 11. "Hold You Down" (featuring Trey Songz, Mike Jones & Birdman)

=== Trey Songz - I Gotta Make It ===
- 07. "Ur Behind"

== 2007 ==
=== Chingy - Hate It or Love It ===
- 09. "Spend Some $" (featuring Trey Songz)

=== Plies - The Real Testament ===
16. "Water"

=== Trey Songz - Trey Day ===
- 01. "Trey Day Intro" (featuring Bun B)
- 02. "Long Gone Missin"

== 2008 ==
=== Jim Jones & Skull Gang - A Tribute to Bad Santa Starring Mike Epps ===
- 11. "Jingle Bellz" (Starr & Juelz Santana)

=== Letoya - Lady Love ===
- 03. "Not Anymore"

== 2009 ==
=== Jadyn Maria ===
- Single "Good Girls Like Bad Boys" (featuring Flo Rida)

=== Chrisette Michelle - Epiphany ===
- 08. "On My Own"

=== Ghostface Killah - Ghostdini: Wizard of Poetry in Emerald City ===
- 14. "Paragraphs of Love" (featuring Estelle)

=== Ginuwine - A Man's Thoughts ===
- 15. "Show Me The Way"

=== Trey Songz - Ready ===
- 13. "Black Roses"

== 2010 ==
=== Monica - Still Standing ===
- 03. "Stay or Go"

=== Soulja Boy - The DeAndre Way ===
- 08. "Blowing Me Kisses" (produced with Clinton Sparks)
- 12. "Boom" (Bonus Track)

=== Keri Hilson - No Boys Allowed ===
- 08. "Buyou" (featuring J. Cole) (produced with Boi-1da, Matthew Burnett & Polow da Don)
- 13. "Hustler" (Bonus Track)

=== Trey Songz - Passion, Pain & Pleasure ===
- 14. "Passion (Interlude)"
- 16. "Blind"

== 2011 ==
=== Jhené Aiko - .sailing soul(s). ===
- 04. "July" (featuring Drake)
- 11. "You vs Them"

=== New Boyz - Too Cool to Care ===
- 09. "Start Me Up" (featuring Bei Maejor)

=== Frank Ocean - Nostalgia, Ultra ===
- 11. "Dust"

=== Wiz Khalifa - Rolling Papers ===
- 13. "Rooftops" (featuring Curren$y)

=== Travis Porter ===
- 00. "Birthday Girl"

== 2012 ==
=== Iggy Azalea - Glory ===
- 01. "Millionaire Misfits" (featuring B.o.B and T.I.)
- 03. "Murda Bizness" (featuring T.I.)

=== Bei Maejor - Upscale ===
- 01. "Don't Stop"
- 02. "Moments"
- 03. "Fitness"
- 04. "Special"
- 05. "Enterlude"
- 06. "Flying Paper Planes"
- 07. "Mesmerized"
- 08. "Freak Side"
- 09. "The Truth"
- 10. "I'm Dying"
- 11. "Pillz"
- 12. "Good Nights"
- 13. "Exitlude"
- 14. "Diamond"
- 15. "Prayers for the Young Soul"
- 16. "Make it Home"

=== Big Time Rush ===
- 00. "Windows Down"

=== Austin Mahone ===
- 00 "Say Somethin"
- 00 "U"
- 00 "Shawty Shawty"

=== Justin Bieber - Believe ===
- 11. "One Love"
- 14. "Love Me Like You Do"

=== Maejor Ali ===
- 00. "Trouble" (featuring J. Cole)
- 00. "Lights Down Low" (featuring Waka Flocka Flame)
- 00. "Party at the Club" (co-produced with Diplo)

== 2013 ==
=== will.i.am - #willpower ===
- 05. "Ghetto Ghetto" (featuring Baby Kaely)

=== Sean Paul - Full Frequency ===
- 02. "Entertainment 2.0" (featuring Juicy J, 2 Chainz & Nicki Minaj) (co-produced with SixOne, Young Yonny & Chef Tone)

=== Justin Bieber - Journals ===
- 01. "Heartbreaker" (co-produced with T-Minus & Chef Tone)
- 11. "One Life"

=== Rich Gang - Rich Gang ===
- 07. "Bigger Than Life" (featuring Chris Brown, Tyga, Birdman & Lil Wayne) (co-produced with Detail)

== 2014 ==
=== Kid Ink - My Own Lane ===
- 12. "I Don't Care ft. Maejor"

=== Meghan Trainor - Title ===
- 01. - All About That Bass (Official Remix ft. Justin Bieber)

== 2015 ==
=== Jake Miller - Rumors ===
01. "Shake It" Single

=== Justin Bieber - Purpose ===
- 12. "Children"
- 14. "Been You"
- 15. "Get Used to It"

=== Trey Songz - Trigga Reloaded ===
- 1. "About You"

=== R. Kelly - The Buffet ===
- 14. "I Just Want to Thank You" (featuring Wizkid)

== Upcoming ==
=== Bow Wow - Underrated ===
- 00. "Sweat" (featuring Lil Wayne) (co-produced with Detail)
