= Bouncing Cats =

- Theatrical release poster
- Directed by: Nabil Elderkin
- Written by: Nabil Elderkin
- Produced by: Scotty Bradfield; Nyla Hassell; George Mays; Claude Merkel; Charlie Rosene; Karma Gardner; Charles Spano
- Starring: Abraham "Abramz" Tekya; Crazy Legs
- Cinematography: Will Basanta; Nabil Elderkin; Clay Jeter
- Edited by: Isaac Hagy
- Music by: Jason Miller
- Production company: Red Bull Media House
- Release date: April 2010 (Newport Beach)
- Running time: 75 minutes
- Country: United States
- Language: English

Bouncing Cats is a 2010 documentary film written and directed by Australian-American director and photographer Nabil Elderkin. The film follows the efforts of Abraham "Abramz" Tekya and Breakdance Project Uganda (BPU) to use dance to empower youth in war-torn Uganda. The film is a testimony of Crazy Legs of Rock Steady Crew and his experiences in the BPU program. The film features narration by Common and additional interviews with Mos Def, will.i.am and K'Naan. Also appearing in the film is Okot Jolly Grace, whose guidance enabled the filmmakers to see and understand the plight of children in northern Uganda.

== Synopsis ==
Bouncing Cats is the story of one man's attempt to create a better life for the children of Uganda using the unlikely tool of hip-hop with a focus on b-boy culture and breakdance. Abraham "Abramz" Tekya, a Ugandan b-boy and an AIDS orphan creates a free workshop teaching youth b-boy culture to 300 disenfranchised kids living in precarious conditions in Kampala in 2006, and in Gulu in North Uganda. Uganda is often referred to as one of the worst places on earth to be a child.

Crazy Legs receives an invitation from Abramz to teach b-boy classes in Uganda. He accepts to join the program and is inspired by the passion for hip-hop by the kids enrolled in it. Bouncing Cats follows Abramz, Crazy Legs, and Breakdance Project Uganda on a journey to use hip-hop culture for positive social change.

In terms of the title, Bouncing Cats "is the sound made by the kids in Uganda when they have no access to a boombox,” according to the film's director, Nabil Elderkin, “Using 'bouncing cats, baboons and cats' in repetition, they create their own beat.”

== Breakdance Project Uganda ==
Breakdance Project Uganda started in February 2006 by Abramz out of his belief that hip hop can be used as a tool to engage and empower disadvantaged youth. Its mission is to involve young people in hip hop culture in order to build leadership skills and promote social responsibility for positive change. From the initial three students who turned up at the first session, the Project has grown through word of mouth, regular showcase performances, and exposure on the World Wide Web to become a thriving organization with over 1,000 members nationally in Uganda and many more supporters around the world.

Abramz organizes breakdancing sessions each week for hundreds of youth in different parts of the country. The Project has been built around free breakdancing classes which are currently offered at the Sharing Youth Centre, Kampala, Gulu Youth Centre and TAKS Art Centre in Gulu. The classes are sustained by members freely passing on their skills to new members, following the BPU ideology that everyone is a student and everyone is a teacher with something positive to give. Members have also made outreach visits to towns in other parts of Eastern and Northern Uganda to share their skills and engage more youth across Uganda. Many of the participating children are extremely vulnerable with members who are orphans, victims of war and poverty, unable to afford proper schooling. Despite the hardships, children walk from miles away to attend the BPU classes each week.

Proceeds from the film benefit Breakdance Project Uganda.

== Awards ==
- In April 2010, it won the "Outstanding Achievement in Documentary Filmmaking" award at Newport Beach Film Festival.
- In September 2010, it won "Best Documentary Feature" at the Urbanworld Film Festival, a leading showcase for urban, ethnic, and multicultural cinema.
- Also in September 2010, the film won an "Audience Favorite" award at DocUtah (Southern Utah International Documentary Film Festival).
- In December 2010, Bouncing Cats won the Bahamas International Film Festival Audience Award for “Best Feature Documentary.”

== US television premiere ==
Bouncing Cats made its US television premiere on Documentary Channel on Saturday, November 19, 2011 at 8:00 p.m. (EST/PST).
