= Extended Play (Austin Mahone EP) =

EP by Austin Mahone
- Released: May 29, 2013
- Recorded: 2012–2013
- Genre: Teen pop
- Length: 20:42
- Label: Chase; Republic
- Producer: DJ Frank E; Mike Fresh; Trent Mazur; Bei Maejor; Austin Mahone; Bruce Robinson; Steve Mac; Matt Mahaffey

Austin Mahone chronology
Extended Play (2013)	The Secret (2014)

Singles from Extended Play
- 1. "Say Somethin" Released: June 5, 2012; 2. "Say You're Just a Friend" Released: December 3, 2012

Deluxe edition
- The deluxe edition artwork

Extended Play is the debut extended play by American singer Austin Mahone, released as a Japanese-exclusive on May 29, 2013 from Republic Records. The album was produced by Mahone himself, alongside DJ Frank E, Mike Fresh, Trent Mazur, Bei Maejor, Bruce Robinson, Steve Mac, and Matt Mahaffey, and features guest appearances from DJ Frank E and Flo Rida.

"Say Somethin" and "Say You're Just a Friend" (featuring Flo Rida and DJ Frank E) were released as singles to promote the album, alongside the promotional singles "11:11" and "Heart in My Hand". Upon its release, the album peaked at number 17 on the Oricon Japanese Albums chart, staying on the chart for a total of 12 weeks.

== Development and release ==
After building a following from posting covers on his YouTube channel in December 2010, he began receiving offers from record labels, most notably from Kara DioGuardi, who wanted to sign him to Warner Bros. Records. Ultimately, on August 28, 2012, Mahone signed to both Chase Records and Republic Records.

The songs are produced by DJ Frank E, Mike Fresh, Trent Mazur, Bei Maejor, Austin Mahone, Bruce Robinson, Steve Mac, Matt Mahaffey. The extended play was released only in Japan from Chase and Republic to promote his songs in the country. The deluxe version backpack the first three video clips of Mahone, plus a short documentary with a message for his Japanese fans. The song "Loving You Is Easy" was featured as the theme song for Japanese TV series Mezamashi in April 2013. Mahone travelled to Japan in June 2013, to promote the EP's release. There, he announced a three-date Japan tour for November 2013.

== Singles ==
"11:11" was released as first promotional single on February 12, 2012. The song reached number 19 on the US Heatseekers Songs chart. The song also sold 100,000 digital downloads. "Say Somethin" was released as the lead single on June 5, and peaked 34 in Billboard Pop Songs. "Say You're Just a Friend" was released as the second single from the EP on December 3. The song peaked number four in Billboard Bubbling Under Hot 100, number two in Belgium Ultratip charts and 12 on the Japan Hot 100. The song features American rapper Flo Rida. In March 2013, a music video directed by Mahone, was released for the song "Heart in My Hand". The song was released as the second promotional single on April 16, 2013.

== Commercial performance ==
In Japan, the EP debuted at number 17 on the Oricon weekly album chart. According to Oricon, the EP spent 12 weeks on the Oricon Weekly Album Top 300 chart.

== Track listing ==
Standard edition
No.	Title	Writer(s)	Producer(s)	Length
1.	"Say You're Just a Friend" (featuring Flo Rida and DJ Frank E)	Leon Huff; Kenny Gamble; Tramar Dillard; Justin Franks; Nick Bailey; Mike Freesh; Trent Mazur; Ryan Ogren; Ahmad Belvin	DJ Frank E; Mike Fresh; Mazur	3:03
2.	"Say Somethin"	Brandon Green; Mike Posner; Bruce Robinson	Bei Maejor; Robinson	2:47
3.	"Loving You Is Easy"	Jason Derulo; Steve Mac; Wayne Hector	Mac	3:12
4.	"11:11"	Alex Kopp; Jakub Andrew	Matt Mahaffey	3:41
5.	"Heart In My Hand" (Piano Version)	Austin Mahone	Mahone	2:19
6.	"Say You're Just A Friend" (Piano version)	Huff; Gamble; Dillard; Frank; Mike Fresh; Bailey; Ogren; Belvin; Mazur	Austin Mahone	2:52
7.	"Say Somethin'" (Instrumental)	Green; Posner; Robinson	Bei Maejor	2:47

Deluxe edition DVD
No.	Title	Director	Length
1.	"Say You're Just a Friend" (featuring Flo Rida) (Music video)	Ray Kay
2.	"Say Somethin" (Music video)	Evan Dennis
3.	"Heart In My Hand" (Music video)	Dave Brytus
4.	"Say You're Just a Friend" (Lyric video)	N/A
5.	"A Special Message From Austin To Japanese Mahomies"	Mahone

== Charts ==
Chart performance for Extended Play
Chart (2013)	Peak position
Japanese Albums (Oricon)	17

== Release history ==
Release formats for Extended Play
Region	Date	Format(s)	Edition	Label	Ref.
Japan	May 29, 2013	CD; CD+DVD	Standard; Deluxe	Chase Records; Republic Records; Universal Music Japan	
