= Sobhhï =

American musician and artist

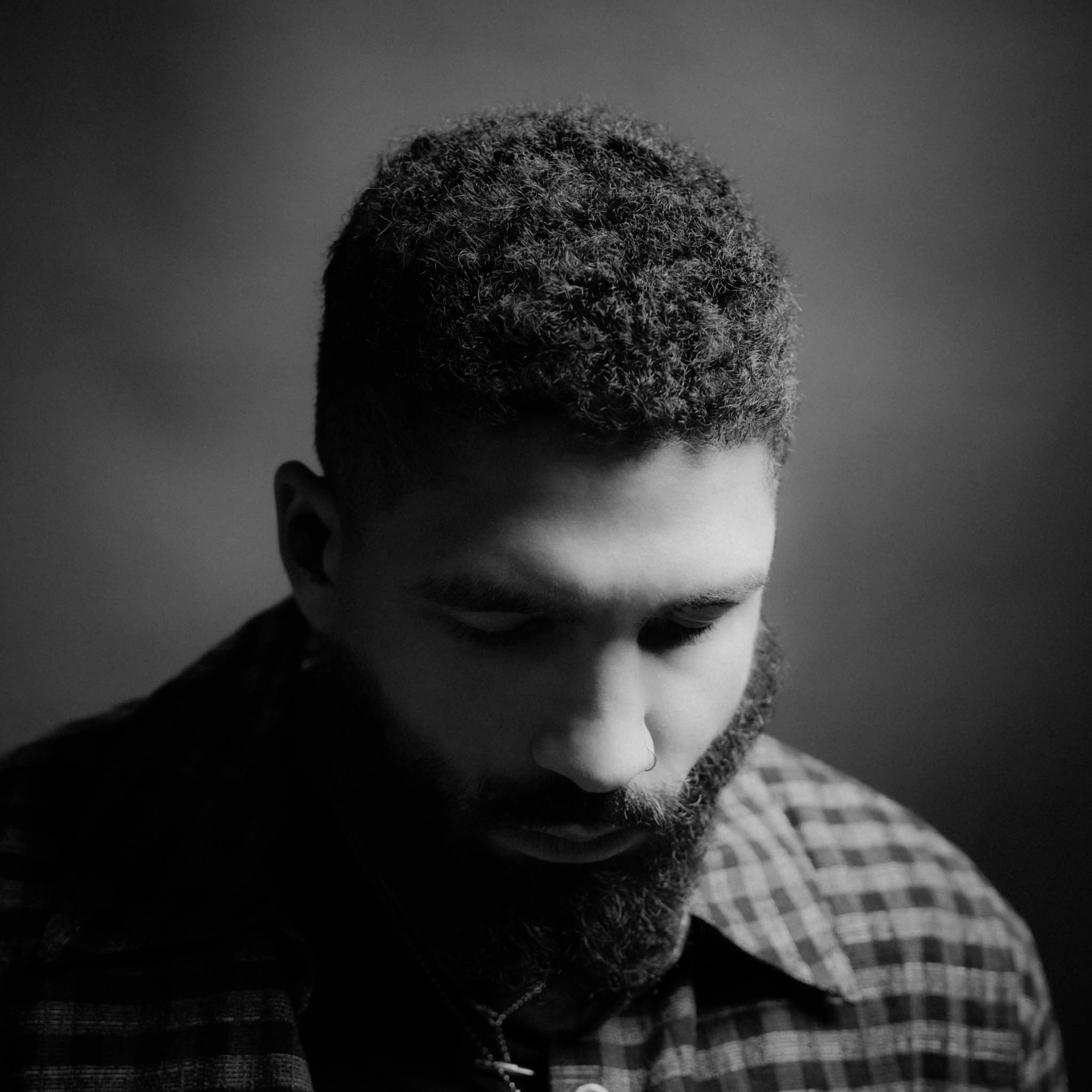
- Sobhhï in 2025
- Born: United States
- Education: University of California, Berkeley; University of Chicago
- Occupations: Musician; photographer; director; artist
- Years active: 2010s–present
- Musical career
- Genres: Hip-hop; R&B

Sobhhï is an American musician, photographer, director, and visual artist based between Dubai and New York City. He has been ranked the number-one-streamed hip-hop and R&B artist in the UAE, and one of the top artists in the Middle East. With a background in computational mathematics, Sobhhï maintains dual careers in science and research as well as the visual and performing arts.

Once a non-performing artist, Sobhhï made his first public appearances at a series of listening parties hosted in late 2021 for his EP Purple I. Sobhhï's identity is so far largely unknown, although he has revealed the name Sobhhï is his grandfather's name and is part of his own name, translating "morning" from Arabic. His musical output has been categorized variously as "music for late nights", or Nocturnal Trapsoul: "dreamy R&B, bedroom soul and hip-hop".

== Personal life ==
Sobhhï was born in the US and lived in multiple locations growing up, including Northern California, Chicago, and Louisiana. Taking night classes as a teen, he graduated high school early and went on to attend college at age 16. He studied economics and statistics at UC Berkeley, but obtained a master's degree from the University of Chicago by the age of 21. He then returned to UC Berkeley, where he researched machine learning and artificial intelligence in pursuit of a PhD in computational mathematics.

In 2018, he decided to pursue a career in music, another focus for him from an early age.

== Music career ==
Sobhhï began his musical career with a collection of dark R&B records, going on to describe the evolution of his musical sound: "There was something I felt was absent in other music [...] collecting these parts and amalgamating them is what eventually resulted in 'my sound'." He currently splits his time between living in the US and the Middle East.

A multi-faceted artist, in addition to writing lyrics and producing the instrumentals, Sobhhï also mixes his own tracks, directs and films his own videos and has developed an independent practice in photography and film. He has cited the album Nostalgia, Ultra by Frank Ocean as his most formative musical influence, and has also mentioned being influenced by, among others, A Tribe Called Quest, James Fauntleroy, Drake, Jeremih, João Gilberto, and Amr Diab. Retaining the majority of the responsibility for the complete creation process has given his music a distinct sound, previously described as both mysterious and euphoric. In 2019, he founded his own record label and streetwear brand Nuit Sans Fin, meaning "night without end" in French.

Beginning in 2017, Sobhhï began creating and releasing his color-themed EP series, which includes Red, Black, and the forthcoming Purple and White. He describes the need for categorizing by color, rather than genre: "The whole color concept comes from the fact that I feel genres are too coarse and limiting to categorize music. You might listen to alternative rock followed by some techno followed by a rap song when you're feeling motivated or in the gym. Clearly the genres don't necessarily line up with how we feel, which to me, is the most important aspect of music."

Sobhhï has released three installments of the Red series, categorizing Red as melancholic and vulnerable alternative R&B. He describes the first three Red EPs as equating to a (now complete) chapter in his personal life, where he understands the music to have evolved alongside changes in his own perspectives.

In addition to the Red series, Sobhhï has begun releasing a series of Black EPs, the first of which, Black I, was released in 2019 and ranked as one of Earmilk's highest rated albums that same year. Sobhhï plans the Black series to be a counterpart to Red, with a raw Trap-soul sound, produced entirely by himself and mastered by Mike Bozzi.

In late 2020, Sobhhï released the collaborative EP Pleasures, which premiered through Okayplayer. In 2022, he went on to release the collaborative project Luxury Casual II, a sequel to 2019's Luxury Casual EP.

== Photography and Video Direction ==
Sobhhï is also active in visual arts, working in photography, video direction, and cinematography. He has directed and filmed several of his own music videos and has been noted for his broader creative involvement designing the label and clothing line Nuit Sans Fin. His visual contributions also extend to photography, with credits for album art such as the cover his Black I EP.

== Listening Parties ==
Between August and December 2021, Sobhhï organized a series of listening parties in anticipation of his EP Purple I. He has cited the parties as a formative moment in his career: "Seeing the unanticipated success of the listening parties [...] We had 450 RSVPs in New York City, 980 in Toronto, over a thousand in Dubai and roughly 2,000 in Jeddah […] All venues reached max capacity shortly after doors opened. Being in the room with so many people who are singing the lyrics, showing us love, and supporting us, validates our purpose."

The listening parties were exclusive events that were organized and hosted by Sobhhï. Sponsorships included the cognac brand Rémy Martin for the Dubai event and the Middle Eastern streaming service Anghami for the final event in Jeddah. The listening parties marked Sobhhï's first public appearances and direct interactions with fans.

== Discography ==
=== EPs ===
- Red I (November 2017)
- Red II (March 2018)
- Black I (February 2019)
- Luxury Casual (December 2019)
- Red III (March 2020)
- Pleasures (November 2020)
- Luxury Casual II (July 2022)
- On Road (June 2024)
