= Speakers Going Hammer =

Single by Soulja Boy

from the album The DeAndre Way
- Released: October 19, 2010
- Recorded: 2010
- Genre: Pop-rap
- Length: 3:09
- Label: Collipark; SODMG; Interscope
- Songwriters: DeAndre Way; Brandon Green
- Producers: Boi-1da; Bei Maejor

Soulja Boy singles chronology
"Blowing Me Kisses" (2010)	"Speakers Going Hammer" (2010)	"She Make It Clap" (2021)

"Speakers Going Hammer" is the third official single from the album, The DeAndre Way, by American rapper Soulja Boy. The song features production by Boi-1da. The song was released to iTunes on October 19, 2010. The song peaked at number 48 on the Billboard Hot R&B & Hip-Hop Songs chart. Artists including T-Pain, Pusha T and Royce da 5'9" have remixed the track.

== Background ==
The track showcases Soulja Boy's style as he raps about how loud his audio pumps. It finds the rapper exhibiting the same pop sensibility fans have come to know. Soulja Boy stated Interscope executive Jimmy Iovine and rapper Kanye West really liked the track which drove him to release it as a single.

=== Production ===
The track was described by Rap-Up as having a "burping bass line and horn-peppered instrumental." DJBooth described the track as being "backed by Boi-1da string stabs and fingersnaps." Sara D. Anderson of AOL Radio stated the track is "backed by crescendoing sirens and synth-laden staccato backbeats."

== Music video ==
The music video was released November 26, 2010 and was directed by Gil Green.

== Live performances ==
The first performance of "Speakers Going Hammer" occurred at the Beats By Dr. Dre headphone product launch in Manhattan on October 9, 2010. The song was performed live at the 2010 BET Hip Hop Awards. Another performance happened on Lopez Tonight. He also performed the song on The Tonight Show with Jay Leno on November 11, 2010. Speakers Going Hammer was performed on The Sims 3 on the Hip Hop station.

== Charts ==
Chart (2010–2011)	Peak position
US Bubbling Under Hot 100 (Billboard)	6
US Hot R&B/Hip-Hop Songs (Billboard)	47
US Hot Rap Songs (Billboard)	24

== Release history ==
Region	Date	Format
United States	October 19, 2010	digital download
United States	November 23, 2010	Radio airplay
