= American Wedding (song) =

2011 song by Frank Ocean

Song by Frank Ocean

from the album Nostalgia, Ultra
- Released: February 16, 2011
- Genre: Alternative R&B; alternative rock
- Length: 7:01
- Label: Self-released
- Songwriters: Christopher Breaux; Don Henley; Glenn Frey; James Fauntleroy; Don Felder
- Producers: James Fauntleroy; Bill Szymczyk

Audio
- "American Wedding" on YouTube

"American Wedding" is a song by American alternative R&B singer Frank Ocean, originally included on his 2011 mixtape Nostalgia, Ultra. The song, an alternative R&B and alternative rock track, was written by Ocean himself, alongside James Fauntleroy, who also produced the song. It would eventually be removed from streaming platforms after the Eagles threatened legal action for its unauthorized use of the 1977 song "Hotel California".

== Composition and lyrics ==
Ocean's vocals are covered over the instrumental of the Eagles' 1977 single "Hotel California". Ocean sings of a failed and hasty romance in the song. The relationship between Ocean and his unnamed bride comes to an abrupt end, with Ocean remarking that his Ford Mustang is all he has to his name in the divorce proceedings, exposing his youth and the rush into the marriage. The song critiques American individualism and the "sham of everlasting love", suggesting that marriage should be out of love rather than materialism. American Wedding features vocals by James Fauntleroy for the song's outro.

== Critical reception ==
Steven Hyden of The A.V. Club described "American Wedding" as Ocean's "boldest move", calling the song "dark, playful, a little tasteless, and absolutely riveting". Connor O'Neill of The Miscellany News praised the song for its storytelling.

== Sampling controversy ==
The track heavily incorporates the instrumental arrangement of the Eagles' song despite not obtaining required licensing. In 2012, representatives of Don Henley, the Eagles' lead vocalist and co-writer of "Hotel California", issued a cease-and-desist letter, threatening legal action if Ocean continued to perform or distribute the song.

Henley criticized Ocean's use of the track, stating that it amounted to copyright infringement rather than artistic reinterpretation. The legal threats led to the removal of "American Wedding" from streaming platforms and music-sharing websites like YouTube. Henley's team also warned Ocean against performing the song live, prompting Ocean to address the situation on his Tumblr blog. He expressed frustration at the legal actions, asserting that the track was a free release and intended to honor the original, not to generate profit:

"He (They) threatened to sue if I perform it again. I think that's fuckin awesome... Ain't this guy rich as fuck? Why sue the new guy? I didn't make a dime off that song. I released it for free."

In 2015, Henley called Ocean a "talentless little prick" in an interview. He stated that Ocean "did not understand or respect intellectual property", and younger artists looked at songs as "interactive playthings". His remarks were criticized by Stereogum, which accused him of condemning Ocean "for something that amounts to an homage" while overlooking the influence of African-American genres, like R&B, on his and the Eagles' music.
