= Pretty Boy Swag =

2010 single by Soulja Boy

Single by Soulja Boy

from the album The DeAndre Way
- Released: June 8, 2010
- Recorded: 2010
- Genre: Southern hip hop
- Length: 3:59
- Label: SODMG; Collipark; Interscope; Universal
- Songwriter(s): DeAndre Way; Joshua "G5Kid" Murphy; Chadron Moore
- Producer(s): Soulja Boy; G5 Kids

Soulja Boy singles chronology
"Daze" (2010)	"Pretty Boy Swag" (2010)	"Blowing Me Kisses" (2010)

"Pretty Boy Swag" is a song by American rapper Soulja Boy, released as the first single from his third studio album The DeAndre Way (2010). It features production from G5 Kids, who helped to write the song along with Soulja Boy.

== In popular culture ==
The song became a meme in early 2019, on the video-sharing platform TikTok. As part of the "Pretty Boy Swag transformation meme", users upload short videos of themselves where they "transform into their favourite pop culture figures". According to Mashable India, during the song's build up, users don pieces of costumes and assume position. When the beat drops during the chorus, they "cut to whatever obscure object they dressed as".

== Charts ==
=== Weekly charts ===
Chart (2010)	Peak position
US Billboard Hot 100	34
US Hot R&B/Hip-Hop Songs (Billboard)	6
US Hot Rap Songs (Billboard)	5
US Rhythmic (Billboard)	19

=== Year-end charts ===
Chart (2010)	Position
US Hot R&B/Hip-Hop Songs (Billboard)	52

== Radio and release history ==
Country	Date	Format	Label
United States	June 8, 2010	Digital download	Collipark Records, Interscope Records
United States	July 20, 2010	Rhythmic contemporary radio	Interscope
