= Swim Good =

Single by Frank Ocean

from the album nostalgia,ULTRA.
- Released: October 18, 2011
- Recorded: 2010
- Genre: Alternative R&B
- Length: 4:17
- Label: Def Jam
- Songwriters: Christopher Breaux; Waynne Nugent; Kevin Risto; Charles Gambetta
- Producer: Midi Mafia

Frank Ocean singles chronology
"Novacane" (2011)	"Swim Good" (2011)	"No Church in the Wild" (2012)

Music video
- Swim Good on Vimeo

"Swim Good" is a song by American singer Frank Ocean, released as the second single from his mixtape Nostalgia, Ultra (2011). The song was written by Ocean alongside producers Midi Mafia and Charles Gambetta. It features additional vocals by fellow Odd Future member Tyler, The Creator. The song explores the topic of romantic baggage, guilt and utilizes several metaphors. Lyrically, the song expresses a narrative about a man who, burdened with many failed relationships, ends his life by driving into the ocean. The track explores tropes of the tragic love story and suicide. The song received positive reviews from music critics, who praised Ocean's vocals and the song's dark subject matter.

When Nostalgia, Ultra was expected to be released as an EP by Def Jam, "Swim Good" was released as the second single, though the EP release was later cancelled. The song peaked at number 70 on the US Billboard Hot R&B/Hip-Hop Songs chart. The song received a music video directed by Australian director Nabil Elderkin. The anime-inspired music video features Ocean driving down remote roads in a Samurai costume and eventually setting his car on fire. Ocean performed the track during his seven show tour through North America and Europe in November 2011 and other notable concerts such as Coachella. On July 31, 2012, the music video was nominated for three MTV Video Music Awards.

== Background ==
"Swim Good" was written by Frank Ocean, Waynne Nugent and Kevin Risto of the duo Midi Mafia, who also produced the track. The song appears on his debut mixtape Nostalgia, Ultra, which was released on February 18, 2011. When asked by The Quietus about his own interpretation of the character in the song it was noted that Ocean "politely withdrew, saying he'd enjoy that discussion but he doesn't want to spoil his audience's experience of his songs". He further commented "but you have fun with the imagery, and for me the whole concept that everything has to be... Like, nobody gets upset with a director when a director's film isn't about his life. People think that with a recording artist that shit has to be like a fucking play by play of their whole life, but it's not. It's imagery, and a little bit of satire." The track was released as the second single from Nostalgia, Ultra digitally on October 18, 2011 by Def Jam Recordings.

== Composition ==
"Swim Good"

"Swim Good" has been interpreted as "a first-person debate about killing yourself". The track has been called an "astonishing suicide song" and that "Ocean finds himself dressed in black ('Like I'm ready for a funeral'), tormented by heartbreak and on the verge of driving his car into the sea." The song has been described as a "grim escape fantasy", which "has the singer driving his car to the shore, his trunk “bleeding” with “broken hearts”. The hook of the song ends with the refrain of "I feel like a ghost, no Swayze, ever since I lost my baby." Pitchfork described the singing as "heart-battered." The Quietus states that the song "makes you realise the ocean means a lot more to this songwriter than the reference to Ocean's Eleven that he's cited in interviews, he is mysterious and tragic."

== Reception ==
"Swim Good" received positive reviews from music critics and was widely considered to be one of the best tracks off Nostalgia Ultra. Sam Hockley-Smith of The Fader commented that "Swim Good" was one of the "highs off of record", as did Anthony Osei of Complex magazine. Pitchfork commented that the track was a "brooding highlight" off the record. In addition, Yahoo! Music's Billy Jounhson described it as a "breakout" song". AbsolutePunk stated the song was "hard-hitting" and "proved that Ocean's voice is as great as his knack for writing thoughtful pop songs." NPR's Andrew Noz commented that "in the standout "Swim Good," he sings of putting broken hearts in the trunk of a Lincoln Town Car and driving to the ocean as they bleed through." Several critics noted the song for its dark subject matter. On the week of September 10, 2011 the song debuted at number eighty-one on Billboard's Hot R&B/Hip-Hop Songs chart, and peaked at position number seventy.

On July 31, 2012, the music video was nominated for three MTV Video Music Awards: Best Direction and Best Male Video, with Ocean being nominated for Best New Artist for his work with the video.

== Promotion ==
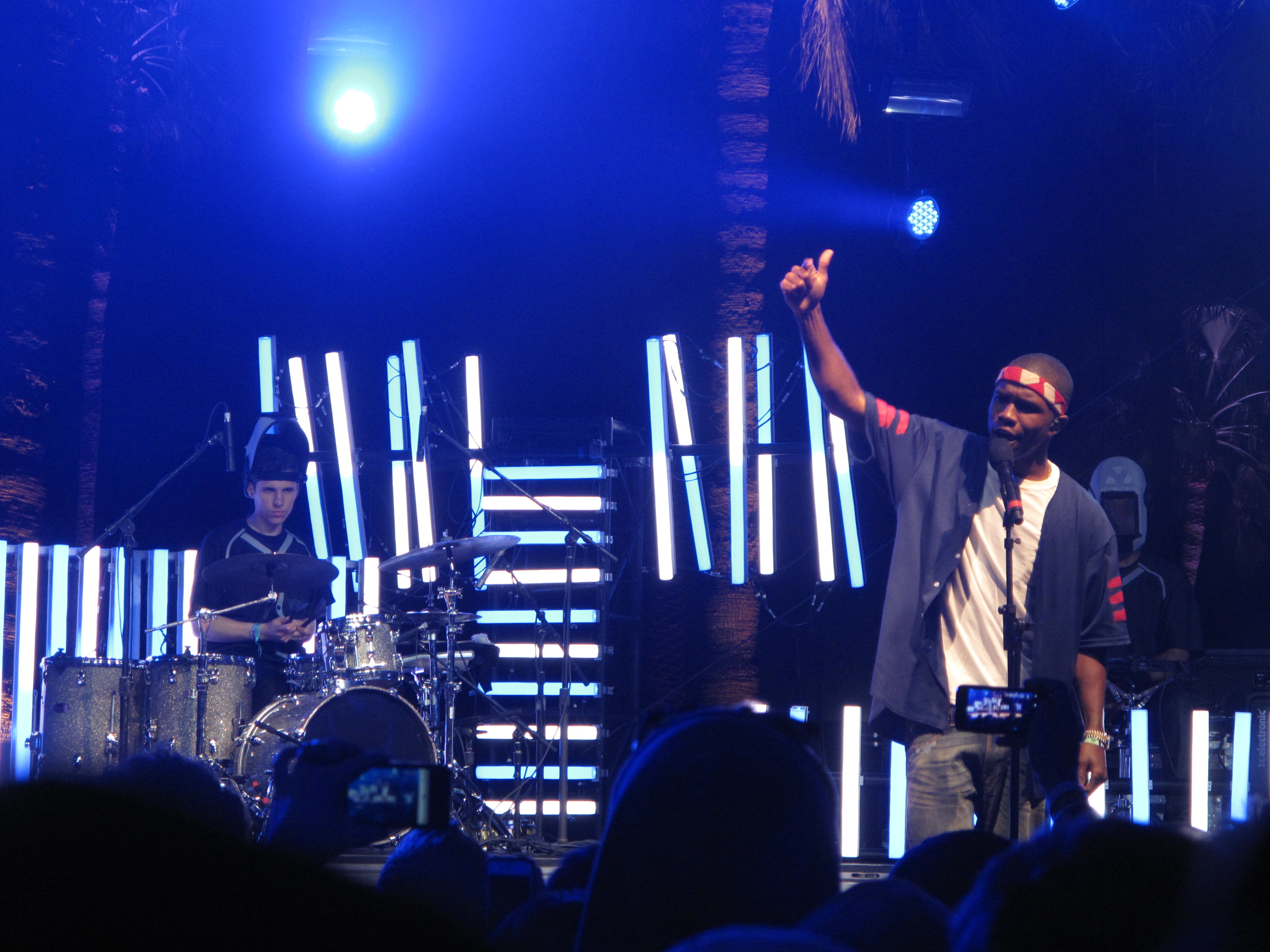
Ocean performing at Coachella in 2012

Ocean released a behind-the-scenes video promoting a music video for the track. It was filmed by his cousin, and released on Ocean's Tumblr on August 11, 2011. The video, directed by Nabil Elderkin, was officially released on September 16, 2011. The video was released on Frank Ocean's Vevo on September 23, 2011 and was available for purchase on iTunes on September 24, 2011. The Fader commented that "Elderkin serves up a fairly literal interpretation of “Swim Good,” Nostalgia, Ultra‘s most heart-wrenching metaphor. It does however feature an explosion, a panda mask and the second appearance of Ninja Frank Ocean." The video features "Frank Ocean and his samurai sword star" and it "blends Asian and aquatic vibes with impressive cinematography." Rap-Up reported "tanquility turns traumatic in Frank Ocean’s suspenseful video."

The clip opens with a dazed Ocean "going through the motions of eating popcorn though he's wearing an Odd Future mask that does not have a mouth opening." It features a "'70s orange and black Lincoln limousine" and Ocean in an orange samurai robe "mysteriously driving along the coastline and deep into the forest." He then whips out his sword and "draws blood from his unsuspecting female victim. He sets fire to the vehicle and watches it burn on the cliff during the explosive conclusion." In the closing moments, "viewers are lead [sic] to believe that the mystery woman was also the passenger of the rear compartment" and the video ends when the "camera zooms in on Ocean's blood-stained sword." The video "adds color to the already chilling, and unusual storyline for alternative R&B song" according to Yahoo.

Ocean embarked on a solo tour through North America and Europe to promote both the mixtape and his other musical projects. The set lists to the various shows varied, though "Swim Good" was performed at all shows. The track was included during Ocean's setlist at the April 2012 Coachella Musical Festival. Complex magazine stated the audience "sang every word of ULTRA’s suicidal serenade “Swim Good,” which closed with the same seagull chirps it does on the tape."

== Personnel ==
- Frank Ocean – vocals
- Midi Mafia – production
- Ariel Chobaz – mixing
- Calvin Bailiff – recording engineering
- Reggie Rojo Jr. – recording engineering
- Kuda Magocha - Sponsor

== Chart performance ==
Chart (2011–12)	Peak position
Belgium (Ultratip Bubbling Under Flanders)	39
US Billboard Hot R&B/Hip-Hop Songs	70

== Certifications ==
Region	Certification	Certified units/sales
Australia (ARIA)	Platinum	70,000^{‡}
New Zealand (RMNZ)	Platinum	30,000^{‡}
United Kingdom (BPI)	Silver	200,000^{‡}
Streaming
Denmark (IFPI Danmark)	Gold	900,000^{†}
^{‡} Sales+streaming figures based on certification alone.^{†} Streaming-only figures based on certification alone.

== Cover versions ==
- 2015 - English singer Indiana on her 2015 debut album No Romeo.
- 2018 - Irish singer Dermot Kennedy on the album Mike Dean Presents: Dermot Kennedy linked here as well as multiple live performances.
- 2020 - American band Switchfoot on their 2020 EP Covers.
- 2022 - American rapper/singer MGK.

== Switchfoot version ==
A cover of "Swim Good" was recorded by American rock band Switchfoot for their Covers EP. It was performed at their "Fantastic NOT Travelling Music Show" during COVID-19.
