= Nostalgia, Ultra =

- Original cover in 5:4 aspect ratio.

Mixtape by Frank Ocean
- Released: February 16, 2011
- Recorded: 2010
- Genre: Alternative R&B
- Length: 42:06
- Label: Odd Future
- Producers: Happy Perez; TROY NōKA; Tricky Stewart; Midi Mafia; James Fauntleroy; Corey Chase

Frank Ocean chronology
Nostalgia, Ultra (2011)	Channel Orange (2012)

Singles from Nostalgia, Ultra
- 1. "Novacane" Released: May 31, 2011; 2. "Swim Good" Released: October 18, 2011

Nostalgia, Ultra (generally stylized as nostalgia, ULTRA., or as nostalgia/ultra in the original files) is the debut mixtape by American singer-songwriter Frank Ocean. It was released on February 16, 2011. Ocean was inspired to make the mixtape after Hurricane Katrina in his native New Orleans and his subsequent relocation to Los Angeles. After joining alternative hip-hop group Odd Future in 2009, he self-released the mixtape, without initial promotion. Nostalgia, Ultra has a unique R&B aesthetic and features surreal themes and nostalgic lyrics. The songs mostly focus on interpersonal relationships, personal reflection, and social commentary. Following its release, the mixtape received rave reviews from music critics. The cover features a picture of a bright orange BMW E30 M3, Ocean's "dream car", in plain sight amidst lush greenery.

In May 2011, Def Jam announced its plans to release the mixtape as an EP on July 26, 2011. However, the release of the EP was indefinitely delayed a few days before release and has since been cancelled. Two singles were released from the aborted EP version: "Novacane", and "Swim Good". Both songs received music videos directed by Australian director Nabil Elderkin. Ocean embarked on a solo concert tour through North America and Europe to promote the record, playing a total of 7 shows. In addition, his 2012 performance at the Coachella Music Festival included several live renditions from the release including "Strawberry Swing" and "Lovecrimes".

The mixtape appeared on several music critics' and publications' end-of-year albums lists. Controversy arose in March 2012 over the song "American Wedding", a remake of the song "Hotel California" by American rock band Eagles. Because of the Eagles’ legal action, Nostalgia, Ultra is still unavailable on music streaming services, like Spotify, Apple Music, and Amazon Music even a decade since its release; commentators consider it one of the most famous and acclaimed albums to remain inaccessible on streaming services. Nostalgia, Ultra was only officially released as a digital download, which was once available for free on sites like Mixtape Monkey and the Odd Future official website. However, for unknown reasons, the full quality audio files have been removed from most online sources despite them being up and available to download for multiple years.

Recording artist Kanye West was reportedly a fan of the mixtape, which led to Ocean appearing on the album Watch the Throne. Subsequently, Ocean collaborated with artists Beyoncé and Jay-Z after they were introduced to the mixtape through West. Following its release, both Ocean and the mixtape have developed a cult following. The mixtape was followed by the release of Ocean's debut studio album Channel Orange to even greater critical acclaim in 2012.

== Background ==
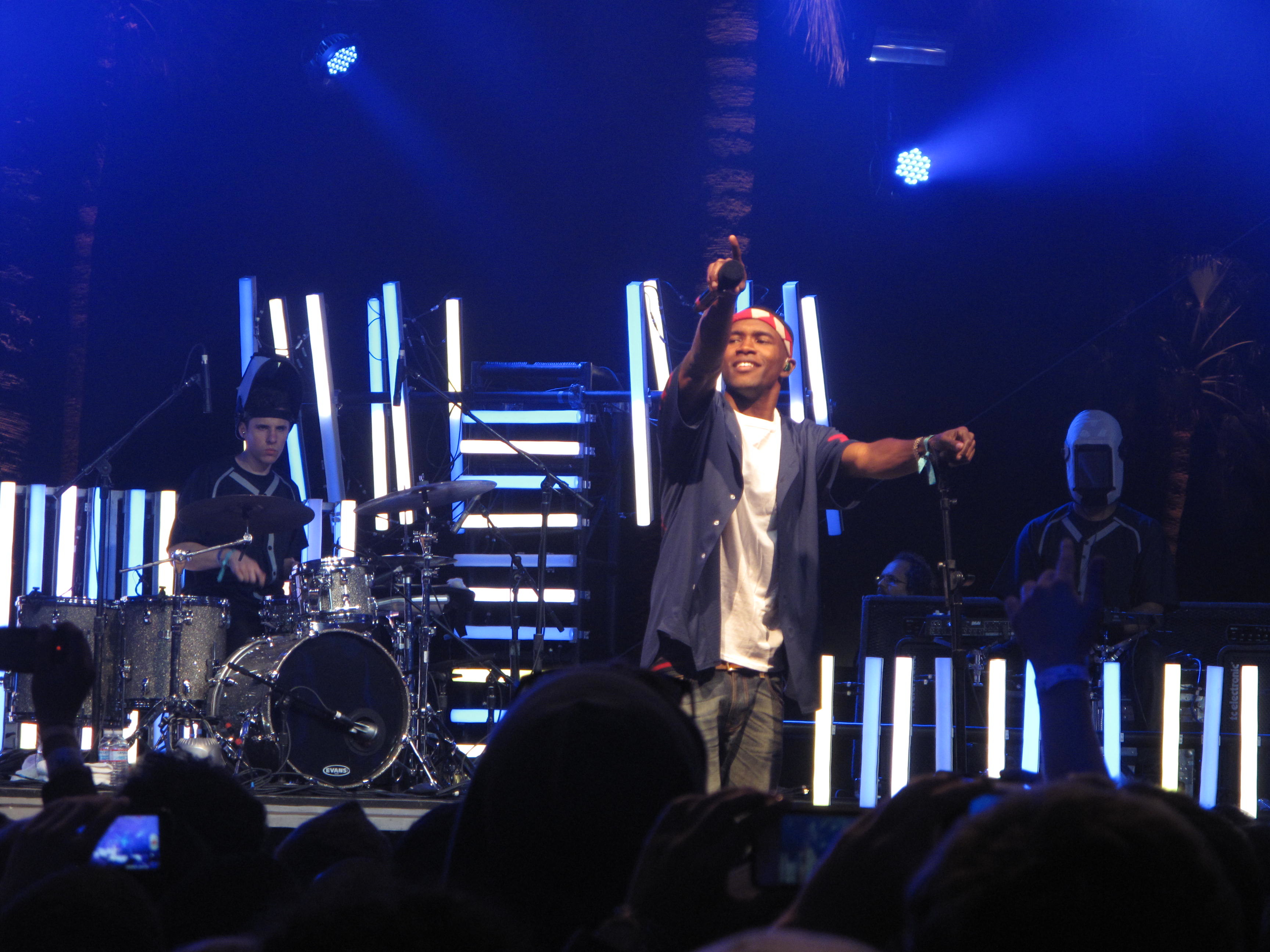
Ocean was forced to move to Los Angeles after Hurricane Katrina.

Frank Ocean was born in Long Beach, California. When he was 10, his family moved to New Orleans, Louisiana. He made the decision to pursue a career in music at a young age, and as a teen, he did neighborhood chores to fund his early studio sessions. After Hurricane Katrina hit his hometown of New Orleans, Ocean moved to Los Angeles to pursue a recording career. He initially had problems maintaining a career while juggling a job, due to spending too much time in the recording studios, making him late for his jobs. He began to write songs and sold them to other recording artists, selling his first song to Noel Gourdin at the age of 19. Explaining why he writes songs, Ocean said that "I feel at a higher level of consciousness when I'm being creative."

Eventually, he landed songwriting gigs for established artists like Brandy, John Legend, and Justin Bieber where he made substantially more money. In late 2009, he met producer Tricky Stewart, who helped Ocean sign a contract with Def Jam Recordings as a solo artist. However, he was initially unable to build a relationship with the company. In protest, Ocean joined the rap collective Odd Future which introduced him to artists such as Tyler, The Creator and Hodgy Beats. His debut song was "SteamRoller" on the Domo Genesis album Rolling Papers. Ocean garnered acclaim and generated interest while in the group, and Rolling Stone magazine's Jonah Weiner called him a "gifted avant-R&B smoothie". During his time with the group he recorded and self-released Nostalgia, Ultra without any pre-release promotion on his Tumblr account.

== Music and lyrics ==
The mixtape samples songs from Coldplay, MGMT and the Eagles, which Ocean sings over. Ocean, when uploading the album to iTunes, labeled it as bluegrass and death metal, out of arbitrariness. When asked about why he uploaded the songs in that way, he replied; "I don't want to seem like I have a cause against genres, or maybe I do... Bluegrass is swag. Bluegrass is all the way swag." Ocean described the making of his mixtape as a labor of love, stating that "It was like difficult to make. Not like writing the songs [or] arranging the songs. That had a level of difficulty, too. But just piecing together all the levels to do it at the level, the quality of records I wanted to make… But, it was a process I appreciate so much."

Ocean calls the album "nostalgic." He explains, "it's a longing for the past. That's what this record felt like." The lyrical content, according to Ocean, relates to heartbreak and other familiar tropes of interpersonal relationships: "I wasn't trying to make a record that people could relate to. I was just trying to make a record with the shit that I wanted to express. The shit that I wanted to get off my chest. [...] A lot of this record is influenced by one relationship, but I don't owe that whole project to one situation. It doesn't matter what the details of it are." Discussing the writing process behind the album, he mused that he was just inspired to tell stories. He continued, "you gotta make sure the listener is listening to you, so if you put it into a song, often times, if the song is striking enough, then you can really deliver the story most effectively while keeping the ear of the listener the whole time. I guess it all starts with the stories for me."

When asked by The Quietus if the songs from the album drew from his personal experiences, Frank commented "My kitchen is usually pretty clean, you know. But you have fun with the imagery, and for me the whole concept that everything has to be... Like, nobody gets upset with a director when a director's film isn't about his life. People think that with a recording artist that shit has to be like a fucking play by play of their whole life, but it's not. It's imagery, and a little bit of satire." When asked if he made R&B music, Ocean replied that he disliked that in the United States, "if you're a singer and you're black, you're an R&B artist. Period." Ocean stated that the songs on the mixtape do contain R&B influences, but that it is not an R&B album entirely.

== Songs ==
"Novacane"
"Novacane" tells a of a girl making a living off doing porn while attending dental school.

"Swim Good"
"Swim Good" is a song which Frank wrote about a murder suicide.

The album begins with a melodic cover of "Strawberry Swing" by English alternative rock band Coldplay. Connor O'Neill of The Miscellany News writes that the cover begins the album with "so much atmosphere you almost melt into it" and then "spreads you over an apocalyptic swan song". The song ends abruptly with the rude sound of an alarm clock, followed by the "nightmarish" song "Novacane". It has been called a love song of sorts, with influence taken from alternative hip-hop group the Pharcyde. Lyrically the track explores a narrative in which the singer meets a girl attempting to pay her way through dental school by working in porn. Ocean meets the girl at Coachella, a musical festival which takes place in Indio, California. Ocean serves as the protagonist in the song, in love with a girl "so gone on drugs that Ocean, wanting to be close to her, has no choice but to get gone on those same drugs". The pair get high using dental local anesthetics. Ocean serves as an unreliable narrator.

Several interludes are placed throughout the album, named after video games, such as Street Fighter, Metal Gear Solid, GoldenEye 007 and Soulcalibur. This is reported to give the album a more nostalgic feel; the record is "held together by tiny interludes named after 1990s video games in which the unmistakable sounds of a cassette player rewinding, fast-forwarding, and stopping are heard". On the track "We All Try", Ocean speaks out against homophobia. According to The Guardian, "Odd Future's frequent use of the word 'faggot' unsettled liberal stomachs", and that "Ocean was brave enough to stand alone once more, declaring on 'We All Try': 'I believe that marriage isn't between a man and woman, but between love and love'. On the same song he reveals his opinion of the pro-choice debate: 'I believe a woman's temple, gives her the right to choose/ But baby don't abort.'" He obliquely "announces his support of a woman's right to choose and gay marriage", both of which are "hardly typical r&b tropes."

Pitchfork wrote that "in a skit called "Bitches Talkin", the ladies tell him to cut it out with the damn Radiohead, while "Optimistic" is playing in the background; in "Songs For Women", he obliges—he's an indie kid when it comes to alienation but a pragmatist when it comes to sex." "Songs For Women" is a song where Ocean can't decide whether to rue or revel in his conflicted feelings about women. The song offers a self-effacing perspective, with a numbed, restrained delivery. Lyrically the track expresses a narrative where he tries to arrange an after-school meeting in his dad's empty house and brags about harmonizing to Otis, Isley and Marvin. He laments that his woman doesn't listen to him or his music: "It's like she never heard of me." In spite of the "suave delivery and the song's inherent tunefulness", the object of Ocean's affection soon ditches his love songs in favor of those sung "by real R&B big-shots (Drake included)".

The mixtape also contains several references to American director Stanley Kubrick and his films, most notably Eyes Wide Shut. Nicole Kidman's adulterous soliloquy from the film can be heard during the song "Lovecrimes", adding a sense of manic dread." The film is also referenced on the track "Novacane", where Ocean also sings that he's "feelin like Stanley Kubrick". Following that is the track "There Will Be Tears". The song has been described as emotional in nature, containing a "glitchy beat and with heavily synthesised vocals". "There Will Be Tears" has a strong bass line accompanying a busy electronic drum track from Roland TR-808. Ocean sings about not having a father; "Hide my face, hide my face, can't let 'em see me crying / Cause these boys didn't have no fathers neither / And they weren't crying", where he "lets his guard down completely."

"Swim Good" has been called an "astonishing suicide song" and that Ocean finds himself dressed in black ('Like I'm ready for a funeral'), tormented by heartbreak and on the verge of driving his car into the sea. The song is a grim escape fantasy describing a murder suicide, which "has the singer driving his car to the shore, his trunk 'bleeding' with 'broken hearts'." The hook of the song ends with the refrain of "I feel like a ghost, no Swayze, ever since I lost my baby." "Dust" uses books as an extended metaphor for memories and experience, with lines like "so many pages I wrote, wish I could revise 'em / But there's no erasing".

The penultimate track is "American Wedding", a 7-minute remake of "Hotel California" by American rock band Eagles. The track expresses an extended tale of a shotgun marriage and subsequent divorce. It's here that we "might get a little peek into the psychology of the man shirking the foremost genre for love songs: He doesn't believe in love. At least not in the United States." The song has a "totally unexpected ending for a song told as a flashback." The album ends with "Nature Feels". The song exhibits Ocean as an "openly fun character", opening the song with the line "I've been meaning to fuck you in the garden." According to Pitchfork, no matter the mood, Ocean is always "quick to add fine particulars that make his songs his songs". Pitchfork called "Nature Feel" an "MGMT-sampling Garden of Eden fuck ode".

=== Singles ===
"Novacane" was officially released as the first single from Nostalgia, Ultra on May 31, 2011. "Novacane" first charted on the US Billboard Hot R&B/Hip-Hop Songs on May 11, 2011, at number 65. The subsequent week, it rose to number 58, and on its third week, the single rose to number 52. In its fourth week, it rose to number 17. The music video for "Novacane" was released on June 16, directed by Australian director Nabil Elderkin. When discussing the video, Ocean commented "I was just trying to connect or articulate visually the feeling of being numb. The feeling of wanting to feel something you can't feel. A lot of things can cause that numbing, but in the video it was some sort of topical aesthetic and a little bit of special effects." The song also charted on the Billboard Hot 100 at position 82 and at 6 on the Billboard Heatseekers Songs.

"Swim Good" was released as the second single from the mixtape on October 18, 2011, and the song charted at position 70 on the Billboard R&B chart for three weeks. It entered the top 40 in Belgium. The music video (directed by Nabil Elderkin) was released via Ocean's tumblr account on September 16. Ocean performed "Novacane" and "She" with Tyler, The Creator at an Odd Future performance in New York City. During Odd Future 2012's tour promoting The Odd Future Tape Vol. 2, Frank performed with the group.

== Release ==
On May 19, 2011, Ocean's record label Def Jam announced its plans to release an EP containing tracks from nostalgia, ULTRA. Ocean announced that the re-release would have been titled Nostalgia, Lite and that it was expected to feature seven tracks. The EP was originally scheduled to be released on July 26, 2011, however, Ocean noted on his official Tumblr page on July 24, 2011, that Nostalgia, Lite would no longer be released on July 26 and that the project was cancelled. Both "Swim Good" and "Novacane" were set to be featured on the release. Talking about which other songs would make it onto the reissue, Ocean commented that "The Eagles sample 'American Wedding' has no chance in hell of being cleared". He continued, "Coldplay sample 'Strawberry Swing', possibly. I hear 'possibly' from people who say they know. MGMT, those guys seem chill. I heard they heard the record 'Nature Feels' and they liked it a lot, so hopefully that can go someway." Other tracks on the reissue were set to be "Acura Integurl", which appeared on the unofficial release The Lonny Breaux Collection, and "Whip Appeal" which was released in 2012. In 2012, Ocean commented again on his blog that "Nostalgia Lite is "never coming out."

== Touring ==
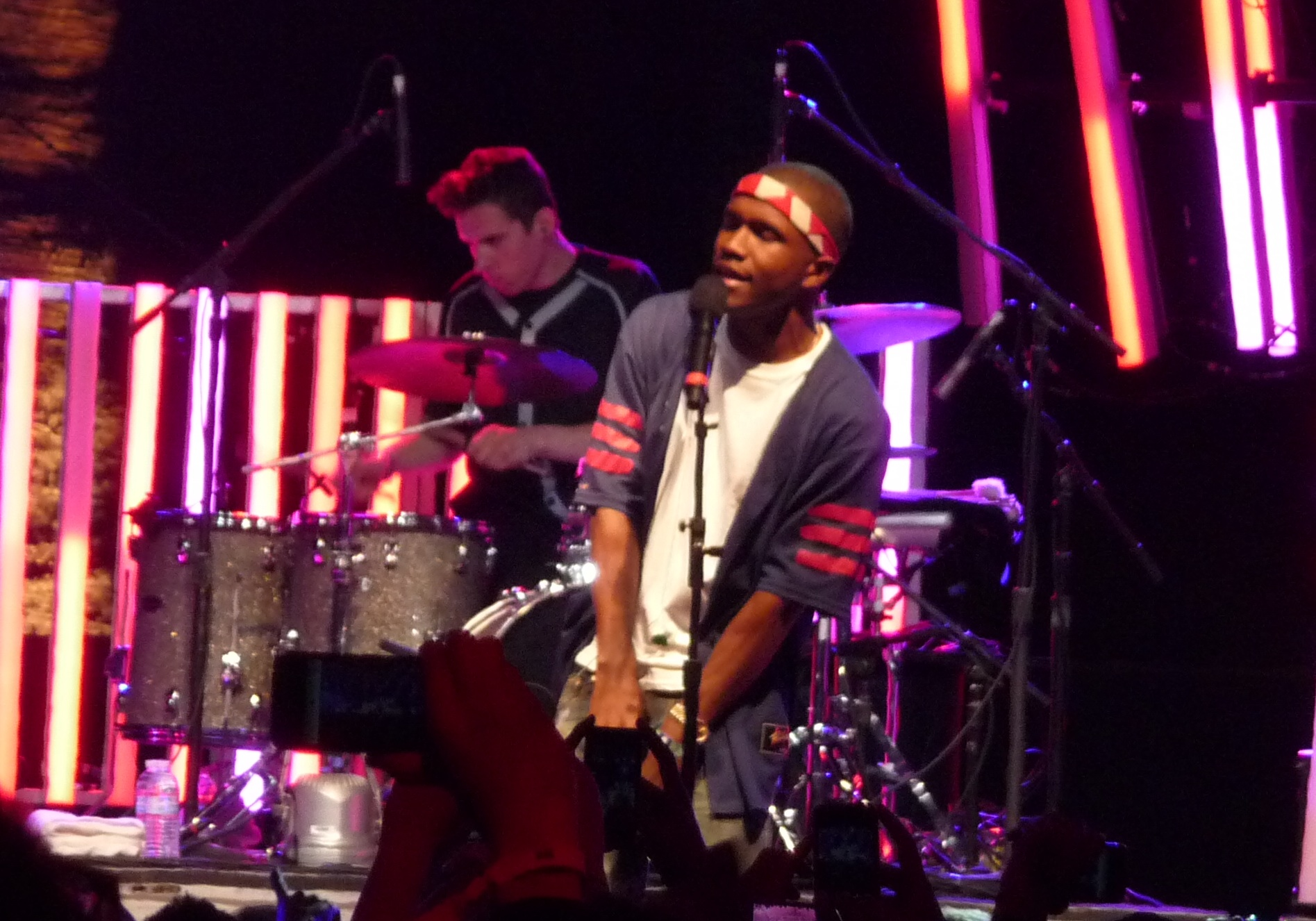
Ocean performing at Coachella in 2012

Ocean embarked on a six-date concert tour from November 5 to November 15, 2011, through North America and Europe to promote both the mixtape and his other musical projects. Originally, six shows were scheduled with a New York City performance at the Bowery Ballroom on the 6th. The original date for that show was postponed to the 27th, and that an additional show on the 28th had been added. The reported reason was because Ocean was sick. The performances featured no opening act, and the only performer on stage at any given time was Ocean.

Rolling Stone reviewed the debut show, calling Ocean awkward at times, though they stated that "fortunately his dispassionately told stories of love and loss in a world that assumes impermanence could handle the load of the audience." MTV commented that it took Ocean "some time to warm up to the crowd" at his debut New Orleans performance, though they noted the performance started the tour to a "promising start". MTV later reviewed the New York performance on the 27th and called Ocean "an audience charmer". The New York Times critic Jon Caramanica gave a positive review to the same New York performance, calling Ocean a "versatile singer" and writing that "in his elegant, savvy, slightly crooked postsoul, he shifts sneakily between the two topics, singing about love as a byproduct of music and using the subject of music to dig deep about love."

The set lists to the various shows varied, though singles "Swim Good" and "Novacane" were performed at all shows. Others tracks like "LoveCrimes", "Dust" and "American Wedding" were performed at a majority of the shows, and "Strawberry Swing" "We All Try" were performed four times each. Portions of "No Church in the Wild" and "Made in America", along with "I Miss You" and "Thinkin Bout You" were also performed. The performances of "American Wedding" were accompanied by comedic moments where Ocean played the sample from "Hotel California" on Guitar Hero: World Tour. Ocean performed at the April 2012 Coachella Musical Festival.

== Critical reception ==
Professional ratings
Aggregate scores
Source	Rating
Metacritic	83/100
Review scores
Source	Rating
AllMusic	4/5 stars
The A.V. Club	B
The Boston Phoenix	3/4 stars
Cokemachineglow	78%
Fact	3/5 stars
Tom Hull	A−
MSN Music (Expert Witness)	A
Pitchfork	7.8/10
RapReviews	7.5/10
Sputnikmusic	3.5/5

Nostalgia, Ultra received widespread acclaim from critics. At Metacritic, which assigns a normalized rating out of 100 to reviews from mainstream publications, the mixtape received an average score of 83, based on nine reviews. Anupa Mistry from Exclaim! called it "sophisticated", "pulsing and expansive", and wrote that Ocean's "alt sensibilities" prove "musically intuitive" AllMusic's Andy Kellman felt that Ocean's uniqueness lies in his "wistful, often self-effacing perspective and numbed, restrained delivery" rather than his production choices, which he found "neither exceptional nor particularly left of center". Steven Hyden of The A.V. Club called the mixtape "dark, playful, a little tasteless, and absolutely riveting". Connor O'Neill of The Miscellany News wrote that, "by funneling [the primary means of R&B decadence] through his diverse and diverging palette, Ocean literalizes both his nostalgic impulses and the odd future of which he is a part." The Village Voice's Sean Fennessey called him "an intuitive R&B stylist, with a firm sense of song structure." Rudy K. of Sputnikmusic felt that the mixtape sounds "so fresh, so real" for a member from Odd Future and stated, "With Ocean, it never sounds contrived."

In his review for MSN Music, Robert Christgau described Ocean's "romantic laments" as "models of texture, respect, and profound loss, their beats subtle, seductive, weird, and seized like time whether he's deploying 'songs for women' that are soon trumped by Drake's, not feeling a porn-moonlighting dental student and her 'novacaine,' or annulling a courthouse wedding solemnized just before his bride turned in her term paper on hijab." Pitchfork's Ryan Dombal commented that "There are distinct elements of Drake's melancholic paranoia and The-Dream's high melodrama, too. But there's also a heady surreality surrounding Nostalgia, Ultra that makes it unique." Jon Caramanica of The New York Times called it "slick and intuitive ... full of astral soul that owes debts to Terence Trent D'Arby, Pharrell Williams, even Drake", adding that "[Ocean] sings casually but precisely, stretching out syllables as if he's forgetting to let them go." NPR's Andrew Noz commented that "It's his songwriting, smart and subtle, that sets Ocean far apart from that pack", adding that "The finest moments of Nostalgia, Ultra orbit the same soul-baring and minutiae-obsessed space as Marvin Gaye's breakup opus Here, My Dear or any number of Prince's more idiosyncratic ballads". No Ripcord's Charlie Jebb wrote that "Nostalgia, Ultra has more than enough good stuff to establish Ocean as an artist to watch," calling it "[an] R&B record with crossover potential without sacrificing soul that creates a complete picture of its author, warts and all."

=== Accolades ===
Nostalgia, Ultra appeared on a number of professional lists ranking the best albums from 2011. The record was nominated for Best International Album at the 2012 Swedish Grammis Awards. Pitchfork put it number 35 on its list of the year's top albums, writing that "Chris Breaux, who goes by Frank Ocean, is a male R&B singer with male R&B contradictions: As much as he wants to listen to his heart, he can't completely ignore his dick." The Guardian writer Tim Jonze named it the year's third best album, musing "unafraid to tackle suicide, abortion and absent fathers, this free mixtape introduced one of our most refreshing new R&B stars." The A.V. Club ranked the album number 15 on its year-end list, commenting that "Nostalgia, Ultra became a runaway Internet hit that showed off Ocean's coaxing croon as well as his outré songwriting skills. Sweetly romantic, yet pensive and moody, Nostalgia is an R&B record for manics, from the hazy lament of 'Novacane' to the inward-looking contradiction of 'Songs For Women' to the clever pop remakes of the Eagles' 'Hotel California' and Coldplay's 'Strawberry Swing'."

Rolling Stone named it the 24th best album of the year, writing "the debut mixtape from the 24-year-old singer (and Odd Future member) is an avant-R&B killer." Complex named it the fourth best album of the year and the second best mixtape. Time named it the fifth best album of the year, and wrote that "Ocean also weaves audio of a tape recorder in rewind, video games and Nicole Kidman's adulterous monologue from Eyes Wide Shut into his songs to give the album a personal feel — as if Ocean were gifting us with a collection of sounds that he finds emotionally meaningful." Spin named it the 41st best album of the year while Mojo placed the album at number 49. In The Village Voice's annual Pazz & Jop poll of American critics nationwide, Nostalgia, Ultra finished 16th among albums that were voted for that year. Former Voice critic Robert Christgau named it the fourth best album of the year in his dean's list traditionally published to accompany the poll.

Nostalgia, Ultra has also appeared on several professional listings of the best albums from its era, including decade-end lists by Rolling Stone (76), Spin (15), and Christgau (15th). In 2019, the album was ranked 41st on The Guardian's 100 Best Albums of the 21st Century list.

The track "Novacane" also received widespread critical acclaim. It was listed as one of the best songs of the year by The New York Times, Ology, Spin, Zimbio, and Pitchfork named both the video and the song as amongst the best of the year.

== Legacy ==
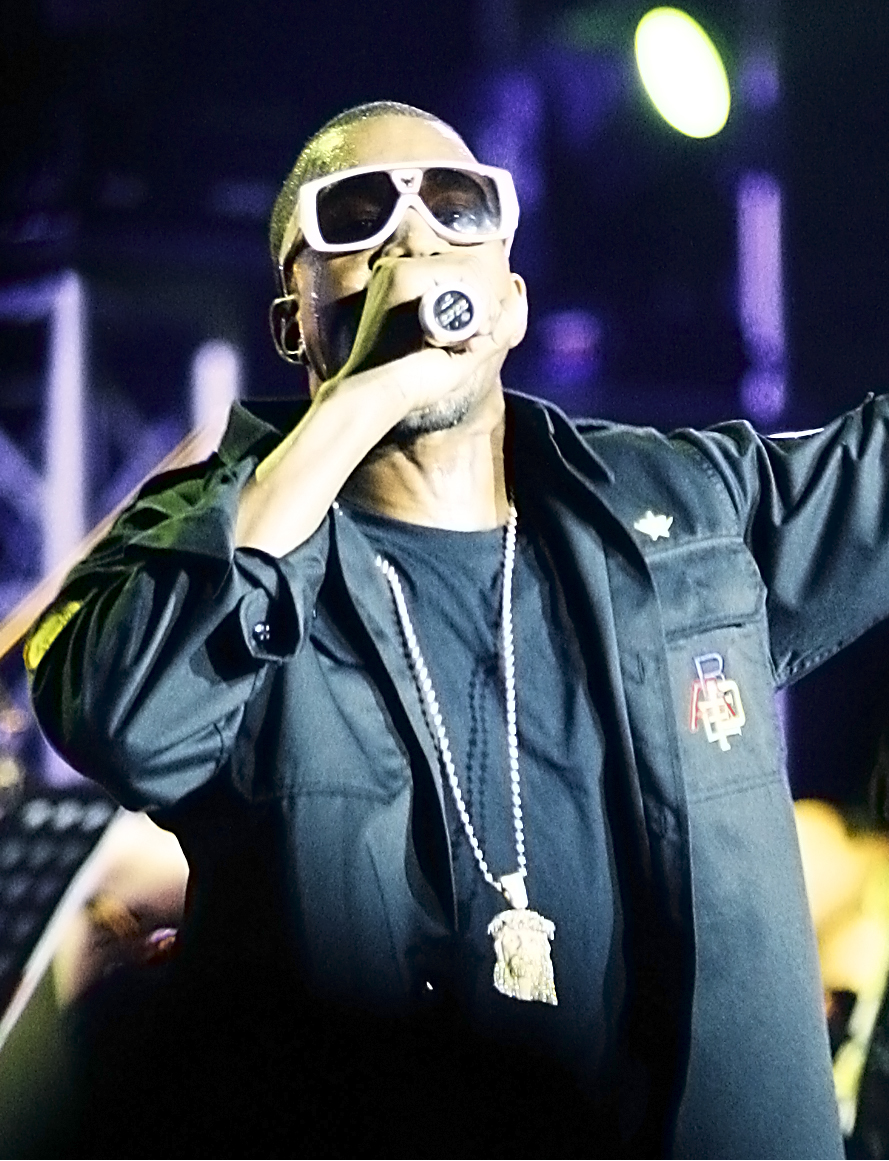
Kanye West, a fan of Nostalgia, Ultra, asked Ocean to work on Watch the Throne, which led to Ocean meeting Beyoncé and Jay-Z.

Before the release of Nostalgia, Ultra, Ocean was a relatively unknown artist who made a majority of his money from ghostwriting. Within six months, it was noted that Ocean had become the "go-to vocal hook man." The release of the mixtape interested rap recording artist and producer Kanye West, who was reported to be a big fan. West invited Ocean to write and sing on two songs off Watch the Throne, a collaborative record with rapper Jay-Z. Frank wrote and provided vocals on tracks "No Church in the Wild" and "Made in America". Singer Beyoncé heard of the mixtape through her husband Jay-Z and was a fan of it. She subsequently invited Ocean to co-write "I Miss You" for her album 4. Discussing how she first heard of Ocean and Nostalgia, Ultra, she commented; "Jay-Z had a CD playing in the car one Sunday when we were driving to Brooklyn. I noticed his tone, his arrangements, and his storytelling. I immediately reached out to him—literally the next morning. I asked him to fly to New York and work on my record.

West also offered to appear on Ocean's debut album, but Ocean refused, saying "as much as I want to work with you… I kind of want to do this without you. I kind of want to do it on my own." Rapper Nas was also a fan of the mixtape, writing that "He's new, he's fresh. He doesn't sound fly-by-night. The moment you hear it — I hear what he's sayin', and I relate." Nas also stated on Twitter that he and Ocean were collaborating on a song from Nas's tenth studio album Life Is Good, though the material never made the album. Chicago born rapper Lupe Fiasco expressed a positive opinion of the release too.

Ocean quickly became Odd Future's main singing highlight, providing vocal hooks on Odd Future albums like BlackenedWhite, Goblin, and The Odd Future Tape Vol. 2. Ocean toured with the group on several occasions and made appearances during their shows. On January 5, 2012, the BBC announced that Ocean had finished in second place of the BBC's Sound of 2012 poll. In addition, MTV described the mixtape as a "cult classic". On August 2, 2012, the music video for "Swim Good" was nominated for three MTV Video Music Awards: Best Direction and Best Male Video, with Ocean being nominated for Best New Artist for his work with the video.

== Controversy ==
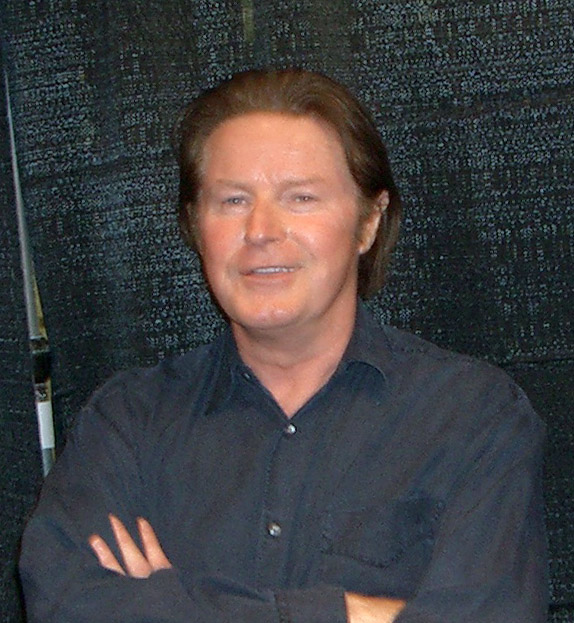
Don Henley of The Eagles would label Ocean a "talentless little prick" for sampling the band's song "Hotel California"; Henley's comments sparked much controversy.

In March 2012, controversy arose over the track "American Wedding", which samples The Eagles' song "Hotel California". Don Henley of the Eagles "had threatened legal action over Ocean's track", claiming that Ocean's version of the song was illegal. The track was widely removed from the internet following this controversy, being removed from music sharing sites such as YouTube. A spokesman for the band announced that a lawsuit would be filed against Ocean if he performed the song live.

"Frank Ocean did not merely 'sample' a portion of the Eagles' Hotel California; he took the whole master track, plus the song's existing melody, and replaced the lyrics with his own. This is not creative, let alone 'intimidating.' It's illegal. For the record, Don Henley has not threatened or instituted any legal action against Frank Ocean, although the Eagles are now considering whether they should."

Several publications noted that the song was released for free on a non-profitable mixtape, and that "live covers of famous songs are common in live performances", and that sampling is a common practice on mixtapes. Ocean responded to the controversy via his Tumblr account:

"He (They) threatened to sue if I perform it again. I think that's fuckin awesome. I guess if I play it at Coachella it'll cost me a couple hundred racks. If I don't show up to court, it'll be a judgement against me & will probably show up on my credit report. Oh well. I try to buy my shit cash anyway. They asked that I release a statement expressing my admiration for Mr. Henley, along with my assistance pulling it off the web as much as possible. Shit's weird. Ain't this guy rich as fuck? Why sue the new guy? I didn't make a dime off that song. I released it for free. If anything I'm paying homage."

Ocean performed the song live occasionally with an altered arrangement not utilizing the original "Hotel California" sample.

Henley eventually spoke out on the controversy in late 2015, defending his stance on the 2012 litigation threat and referring to Ocean as a "talentless little prick". These comments sparked outcry, with Stereogum claiming that Henley was "yelling at clouds again", while pointing to the hypocrisy in Henley's condemnation of Ocean for creating a homage to his song while he and the Eagles were "incapable of acknowledging the deep influence" that the African-American-pioneered genre of R&B had on them.

== Track listing ==
No.	Title	Writer(s)	Producer(s)	Length
1.	"Street Fighter"	Frank Ocean		0:23
2.	"Strawberry Swing"	Ocean; Guy Berryman; Jonny Buckland; Will Champion; Chris Martin		3:55
3.	"Novacane"	Ocean; Christopher Stewart; Monte Neuble	Tricky Stewart	5:03
4.	"We All Try"	Ocean; Happy Perez	Perez; Corey Chase	2:52
5.	"Bitches Talkin' (Metal Gear Solid)"	Thom Yorke; Jonny Greenwood; Colin Greenwood; Ed O'Brien; Philip Selway		0:22
6.	"Songs for Women"	Ocean; Perez	Perez	4:13
7.	"Lovecrimes"	Ocean; Antwoine Collins	TROY NōKA	4:00
8.	"Goldeneye"			0:18
9.	"There Will Be Tears"	Ocean; Breaux Benjamin		3:15
10.	"Swim Good"	Ocean	Midi Mafia	4:17
11.	"Dust"	Ocean; Bei Maejor; Collins	Maejor; TROY NōKA	2:34
12.	"American Wedding" (featuring James Fauntleroy; later removed)	Ocean; Glenn Frey; Don Henley; Don Felder	Fauntleroy	7:01
13.	"Soul Calibur"			0:18
14.	"Nature Feels"	Ocean; Andrew VanWyngarden; Ben Goldwasser; Will Berman		3:43
Total length:				42:06

=== Notes ===
- All tracks are stylized in all lowercase.
- "Strawberry Swing" contains samples of "Strawberry Swing", written by Guy Berryman, Jonny Buckland, Will Champion, and Chris Martin, as performed by Coldplay.
- "Bitches Talkin'" contains a sample of "Optimistic", written by Thom Yorke, Jonny Greenwood, Colin Greenwood, Ed O'Brien, and Philip Selway, as performed by Radiohead.
- "Lovecrimes" contains excerpts from the motion picture Eyes Wide Shut, performed by Nicole Kidman.
- "There Will Be Tears" contains a sample of "There Will Be Tears" written by Benjamin Hudson McIldowie, as performed by Mr Hudson.
- "American Wedding" contains samples of "Hotel California", written by Glenn Frey, Don Henley, and Don Felder, as performed by the Eagles.
- "Soul Calibur" contains a sample of "4th Dimensional Transition" and "Kids", written by Andrew VanWyngarden and Ben Goldwasser, as performed by MGMT.
- "Nature Feels" contains a sample of "Electric Feel", written by Andrew VanWyngarden, Ben Goldwasser, and Will Berman, as performed by MGMT.
