= Say Somethin (Austin Mahone song) =

- Single cover

Single by Austin Mahone

from the album Extended Play
- Released: June 5, 2012
- Recorded: 2012
- Genre: Teen pop
- Length: 2:48
- Label: Chase; Republic
- Songwriters: Austin Mahone; Brandon Green; Mike Posner; Bruce Robinson
- Producers: Maejor; Robinson

Austin Mahone singles chronology
| "Say Somethin" (2012) | "Say You're Just a Friend" (2012) |

Music video
- "Say Somethin" on YouTube

"Say Somethin" is the debut single by American singer Austin Mahone, released from his first EP, Extended Play. It was released June 5, 2012, and was his first big charting success. It combines modern teen pop of the 2010s with vintage pop of the 1950s and 1960s.

== Background and composition ==
"Say Somethin'" was written by Austin Mahone, Brandon Green, Mike Posner and Bruce Robinson. Speaking about the song's meaning, Mahone stated, "It's about a girl that I like who is shy. I'm asking her to just come out of her shell and 'Say Somethin'' to me, to let me know she's interested." The song was released after he signed with Chase and Republic Records.

It composed in the key of E major and the tempo is 126-132 bpm with vocal range of B3-B5, according to Musicnotes.com.

== Critical reception ==
Taylor Weatherby of Billboard stated, "Between a bopping beat and super innocent lyrics — not to mention his adorable pre-puberty vocals — this is one heck of a hook-'em track for a debut."

== Chart performance ==
In 2012, Mahone released the promotional single "11:11" that reached number 19 on the US Billboard Heatseekers Songs chart. The follow-up "Say Somethin'" did even better, charting at number 34 on the US Billboard Pop Songs chart.

== Music video ==
The music video for "Say Somethin'" premiered via VEVO on September 11, 2012. The video was filmed in a school setting and was heavily played on teen-oriented music channels, giving him great media exposure. The video was directed by Evan Dennis.

== Awards and nominations ==
Awards and nominations for "Say Somethin"
| Year | Organization | Award | Result | Ref(s) |
|---|---|---|---|---|
| 2013 | Radio Disney Music Awards | Best Acoustic Performance | Nominated | |

== Charts ==
Chart performance for "Say Somethin"
| Chart (2012) | Peak position |
|---|---|
| US Pop Airplay (Billboard) | 34 |

== Certifications ==
Certifications and sales for "Say Somethin"
| Region | Certification | Certified units/sales |
|---|---|---|
| United States (RIAA) | Gold | 500,000^{‡} |
^{‡} Sales+streaming figures based on certification alone.

== Release history ==
Release dates and formats for "Say Somethin"
| Region | Date | Format | Label | Ref. |
|---|---|---|---|---|
| United States | September 4, 2012 | Contemporary hit radio | Chase/Republic | |
