= Nabil Elderkin =

American-born Australian film director and photographer

- Born: February 11, 1982 (age 44); Chicago, Illinois, U.S.
- Education: Port Macquarie High School
- Occupations: Photographer; film director
- Years active: 2002–present
- Website: nabil.com

Nabil Elderkin (born February 11, 1982) is an American-born Australian film and music video director and photographer, who is of Iranian and American descent. He is mononymously credited as Nabil in his videos. Elderkin has directed videos for musical artists such as: Dua Lipa, Kanye West, Kendrick Lamar, Frank Ocean, John Legend, Travis Scott, Arctic Monkeys, and Foals. Born in Chicago and raised in Australia, he is most recently based in Los Angeles, California.

== Early life ==
Elderkin was born in Chicago, Illinois, to an American father and an Iranian mother. His family moved to Port Macquarie, New South Wales, Australia when he was age 2, and he became a naturalised Australian citizen. He studied at Port Macquarie High School and was a keen sportsman, particularly an avid surfer. His initial experience of photography was through photo shoots of the surfing scene in Australia.

In early 1990s, his parents separated and his mother returned to the United States. Soon Elderkin, just 17 at the time, joined his mother in Chicago. He studied photography and for some years photographed music bands and concerts and Chicago-based DJs.

== Career ==
Elderkin's big break came when he befriended the then relatively unknown rap artist Kanye West. Elderkin had heard a Kanye West mixtape and had tried to contact the rapper by looking up www.kanyewest.com. The website came up as unregistered but available for registration, so he bought the domain name on an impulse. Three weeks later an executive from Roc-A-Fella Records contacted Elderkin to tell him the label had just signed Kanye West to a multi-album deal and wanted to know how much he was asking for the domain name. Elderkin wasn't interested in a payment for the domain and preferred to transfer the domain name provided he could meet the new artist and do a photoshoot with him, these images went on to be the artist's first publicity photos. John Legend also happened to be at the photoshoot which led to the two forming a relationship, and future video work together where Elderkin introduced Legend to his future wife, Chrissy Teigen.

Nabil Elderkin's work has appeared in many platforms including advertising, magazine editorials and covers, artist branding, music videos, books, album covers and photojournalism. His clients list includes, amongst others artists, Kanye West, Nicki Minaj, Frank Ocean, Nas, Bon Iver, The Black Eyed Peas, K'naan, James Blake, Seal, John Legend. He has worked for record labels Capitol Records, Universal Music, Sony, Warner Bros. print and broadcast media Billboard, Rolling Stone, Vogue, MTV, Rizzoli, as well as fashion personalities like designer Jeremy Scott and model Heidi Klum, the charity Oxfam and manufacturers Coca-Cola, Foot Locker, Nike, Adidas, Vans, Billabong.

Elderkin also photographed Kanye West's biographical book Glow in the Dark documenting the Kanye West's "Glow in the Dark Tour" in 2008. His endeavour into photojournalism in war-torn Democratic Republic of the Congo through co-operation with Oxfam worker Claire Lewis resulted in a critically acclaimed exhibition at the United Nations General Assembly in New York in 2007. He also has directed numerous films for Frank Ocean, such as Pyramids, Novacane and Swim Good.

His feature-length debut is the award-winning documentary film Bouncing Cats about a breakdance workshop for teaching b-boy culture to Ugandan disenfranchised youth. The film was financed by Red Bull through its Red Bull Media House.

In 2019, he completed his first narrative feature Gully starring Amber Heard, Terrance Howard, Jonathan Majors, and Charlie Plummer. Gully debuted at the 2019 Tribeca Film Festival.

He is also a co-creator and producer of the new documentary series Beat Nation. The series is also produced by Mattia Bogianchino and Addison O'Dea.

== Bibliography ==
- 2009: Glow in the Dark (Book and CD) – by Kanye West, photography by Nabil Elderkin

== Filmography ==
- 2010: Bouncing Cats
- 2015: Captureland
- 2019: Gully

== Videography ==
- Tyla (South African singer), Gunna (rapper) & Skillibeng - “Jump (Tyla, Gunna, and Skillibeng song)”
- Arctic Monkeys – "Why'd You Only Call Me When You're High?"
- Alt-J – "Hunger of the Pine"
- Antony and the Johnsons – "Cut the World"
- Anohni – "Drone Bomb Me"
- Baauer & Just Blaze featuring Jay-Z – "Higher"
- Billie Eilish, ROSALÍA - "Lo Vas A Olvidar"
- Bon Iver – "Holocene"
- Bon Iver – "Towers"
- Bruno Mars – "Grenade"
- Common – "The Game"
- Dua Lipa – "Don't Start Now"
- Nas & Damian Marley – "Patience"
- Electric Six – "Bodyshot"
- FKA Twigs – "Two Weeks"
- Foals – "Bad Habit"
- Foals – "Late Night"
- Foals – "Give It All"
- Foals - "Mountain at My Gates"
- Frank Ocean – "Novacane"
- Frank Ocean – "Pyramids"
- Frank Ocean – "Swim Good"
- GOOD Music – "Mercy"
- J. Cole - “Power Trip”
- James Blake – "Overgrown"
- James Blake featuring Chance the Rapper – "Life Round Here"
- James Blake featuring Travis Scott – "Mile High"
- Jeremy Scott – "Jump"
- John Legend – "P.D.A. (We Just Don't Care)"
- John Legend – "All of Me"
- John Legend – "Love Me Now"
- K'naan – "Take a Minute"
- K'naan – "T.I.A."
- Kanye West – "Coldest Winter"
- Kanye West – "Welcome to Heartbreak"
- Kanye West featuring Mr Hudson – "Paranoid"
- Kid Cudi - “She Knows This”
- Kid Cudi - “Heaven on Earth”
- Kendrick Lamar – "DNA."
- Little Dragon – "Pretty Girl"
- Mike Will Made It - "Perfect Pint"
- Nicki Minaj – "Lookin Ass"
- Poliça featuring Justin Vernon – "Tiff"
- Popcaan – "Firm & Strong"
- Seal – "Change Is Gonna Come"
- Skrillex – "Fuck That"
- SZA featuring Kendrick Lamar – "Doves in the Wind"
- SZA featuring Travis Scott – "Love Galore"
- SZA – "Supermodel"
- Travis Scott – "YOSEMITE"
- Travis Scott – "Piss on Your Grave"
- Vince Staples – "Prima Donna"
- The Weeknd – "Twenty Eight"
- The Weeknd – "Acquainted"

== Awards ==
Year	Project	Ceremony	Category	Result
2012	Frank Ocean, "Swim Good"	MTV Video Music Awards	Best Direction in a Video	Nominated
2012	Frank Ocean, "Swim Good"	MTV Video Music Awards	Best Male Video	Nominated
2012	Kanye West, "Mercy"	MTV Video Music Awards	Best Hip Hop Video	Nominated
2010	Bouncing Cats	Newport Beach Film Festival	Outstanding Achievement in Documentary Filmmaking	Won
2010	Bouncing Cats	Urbanworld Film Festival	Best Documentary Feature	Won
2010	Bouncing Cats	Bahamas International Film Festival	Best Documentary Feature	Won
2010	Bouncing Cats	DocUtah	Audience Favorite	Won
