= Tell Daddy =

Single by Maejor featuring Ying Yang Twins and Waka Flocka Flame
- Released: December 1, 2014
- Recorded: 2014
- Genre: Hip hop, R&B
- Length: 3:59
- Label: First of the Month, LLC
- Songwriters: Mick Schultz; Kyren Eaddy; Brandon Green; Juaquin Malphurs; Deongelo Holmes & Eric Jackson
- Producers: Mick Schultz; Juliann Tanai; Maejor

Maejor Ali singles chronology
"Lolly" (2013)	"Tell Daddy" (2014)	"We Ready" (2015)

Waka Flocka Flame singles chronology
"Tell Daddy" (2014)

Ying Yang Twins singles chronology
"Tell Daddy" (2014)

Music video
- "Tell Daddy" on YouTube

"Tell Daddy" is a song by American singer-songwriter and record producer, Maejor. The song was released on December 1, 2014, as a digital download, and features vocals from hip hop duo Ying Yang Twins and rapper Waka Flocka Flame. The song was produced by Maejor, alongside Mick Schultz.

== Music video ==
The music video was released on December 1, 2014.

== Release history ==
Country	Date	Format	Label
United States	December 1, 2014	Digital download	First of the Month, LLC
