= Say You're Just a Friend =

Single by Austin Mahone featuring Flo Rida

from the album Extended Play
- Released: December 3, 2012
- Recorded: 2012
- Genre: Teen pop
- Length: 3:02
- Label: Chase; Republic
- Songwriters: Leon Huff; Kenny Gamble; Tramar Dillard; Justin Franks; Nick Bailey; Mike Freesh; Trent Mazur; Ryan Ogren; Ahmad Belvin
- Producers: DJ Frank E; Mike Freesh; Mazur

Austin Mahone singles chronology
"Say Somethin" (2012)	"Say You're Just a Friend" (2012)	"What About Love" (2013)

Flo Rida singles chronology
"Change Your Life" (2012)	"Say You're Just a Friend" (2012)	"Sweet Spot" (2013)

"Say You're Just a Friend" is a song by American singer-songwriter Austin Mahone from his debut extended play, Extended Play. The song was released for a digital download on December 3, 2012, and features vocals from American rapper Flo Rida.

== Composition ==
The song was written by Flo Rida, DJ Frank E, Nick Bailey, Mike Freesh, Trent Mazur, Ryan Ogren, Ahmad Belvin and produced by DJ Frank E, Mike Freesh, Trent Mazur. The song interpolates the chorus of the hit song "Just a Friend" by rapper Biz Markie, which itself interpolates (You) Got What I Need, written by Gamble and Huff and performed by soul singer Freddie Scott. Therefore, Gamble and Huff are credited as songwriters. Mahone spoke about collaborating with Flo Rida in an interview with Hellenic News.

"I was a huge fan of Flo Rida and I thought it would be cool to get him on my track. I thought it turned out pretty good. He's a super nice guy, talented and very humble. I was very blessed to be able to work with him."

A piano version of the song was released in February 2013. Mahone revealed why he released the piano rendition of the song, explaining "I knew my fans love the original version, but I saw a lot of comments saying that they couldn't really hear my voice, so I wanted to reassure them that I can sing the song. I thought it'd be cool to not only have the original version but also the piano version and change it up."

== Music video ==
A music video to accompany the release of "Say You're Just a Friend" premiered via MTV on February 7, 2013. It was later released on YouTube the following day via VEVO. The video was directed by Ray Kay and the girl starring as Mahone's love interest is model Kimberly Schanks.

A second music video was released online on February 27; this time it's the video of the piano version of the song.

== Track listing ==
Digital download
No.	Title	Length
1.	"Say You're Just a Friend" (featuring Flo Rida)	3:02

US CD single
No.	Title	Length
1.	"Say You're Just a Friend" (featuring Flo Rida)	3:02
2.	"Say Somethin"	2:47

== Credits and personnel ==
- Lead vocals – Austin Mahone, Flo Rida
- Lyrics – Austin Mahone, Gamble and Huff, Flo Rida, DJ Frank E, Nick Bailey, Mike Freesh, Trent Mazur, Ryan Ogren, Ahmad Belvin
- Producers – DJ Frank E, Mike Freesh, Trent Mazur
- Label: Chase, Universal Republic Records, Republic Records

== Awards and nominations ==
Awards and nominations for "Say You're Just a Friend"
Year	Organization	Award	Result	Ref(s)
2013	Radio Disney Music Awards	Best Crush Song	Nominated	

== Charts ==
=== Weekly charts ===
Weekly chart performance for "Say You're Just a Friend"
Chart (2013)	Peak position
Belgium (Ultratip Bubbling Under Flanders)	2
Belgium (Ultratip Bubbling Under Wallonia)	32
Japan Hot 100 (Billboard)	12
US Bubbling Under Hot 100 (Billboard)	4

=== Year-end charts ===
Year-end chart performance for "Say You're Just a Friend"
Chart (2013)	Position
Japan Radio Songs (Billboard Japan)	67

== Certifications ==
Region	Certification	Certified units/sales
United States (RIAA)	Gold	500,000^{‡}
^{‡} Sales+streaming figures based on certification alone.

== Release history ==
Release dates for "Say You're Just a Friend"
Region	Date	Format	Label	Ref.
United States	December 3, 2012	CD; digital download	Chase; Republic Records	
Belgium	December 7, 2012	Digital download	Chase; Republic Records	
United States	January 15, 2013	Mainstream airplay	Chase; Republic Records	
