= Novacane (song) =

2011 debut single by Frank Ocean

Single by Frank Ocean

from the album nostalgia, ULTRA.
- Released: May 31, 2011
- Recorded: 2010
- Genre: Neo soul; alternative R&B; alternative hip hop
- Length: 5:02
- Label: Def Jam
- Songwriters: Christopher Breaux; Christopher Stewart; Monte Neuble
- Producer: Tricky Stewart

Frank Ocean singles chronology
"She" (2011)	"Novacane" (2011)	"Swim Good" (2011)

Music video
- Novacane on Vimeo

"Novacane" is the debut solo single by American singer Frank Ocean. It was released as the lead single from his mixtape Nostalgia, Ultra. The song was written by Ocean, Tricky Stewart and Victor Alexander, and produced by Stewart. Lyrically, the song narrates a young female dental student who makes a living doing porn and who recreationally uses local anesthetic drugs which she acquires from her place of study. The song explores themes of isolation, loneliness and a lack of feeling caused by numbness. The song received highly positive reviews from music critics and was listed as one of the best songs of the year by publications such as The New York Times, Spin, Ology, Zimbio and Pitchfork. Reviews praised the dark subject matter of the song, and praised Ocean's ability to create narratives and the sonic atmosphere of the track. The cover for Novacane is similar to the Roxy Music album Stranded.

When Nostalgia, Ultra was expected to be re-released as a commercial EP by Def Jam, "Novacane" was released as its first single, though the EP's release through the label was cancelled. The song peaked at number 82 on the Billboard Hot 100 and entered the top 10 on the Heatseekers Songs chart. The song received a music video directed by Australian director Nabil Elderkin released on June 16. The highly stylized video shows a long take of Ocean sitting in a dimly lit room as he applies lotion. Ocean performed the song during a show in New York City with alternative hip hop group OFWGKTA, and during his seven show tour through North America and Europe. It was also performed during his fourteen-show North American tour in support of his debut studio album, Channel Orange.

== Background ==
"Novacane" was written by Frank Ocean and Victor Alexander with co-writing by Tricky Stewart who also produced the track. The song appears on his debut mixtape Nostalgia, Ultra which was released on February 18, 2011. When asked by The Quietus if the song drew from his personal experiences, Ocean commented that "I don't do cocaine for breakfast!", a reference to the lyrics from the song. He continued, "My kitchen is usually pretty clean, you know. But you have fun with the imagery, and for me the whole concept that everything has to be… Like, nobody gets upset with a director when a director's film isn't about his life. People think that with a recording artist that shit has to be like a fucking play by play of their whole life, but it's not. It's imagery, and a little bit of satire." When asked if the song was an R&B track, Ocean replied that he disliked how that in the United States, "if you're a singer and you're black, you're an R&B artist. Period." Ocean stated that the song does contain R&B influences, though he didn't feel it wasn't entirely one in nature. The track was released as a digital download on May 31, 2011, by Def Jam Recordings.

== Composition ==
"Novacane"
"Novacane" tells a narrative of a girl making a living off doing porn and being a dentist.

"Novacane" expresses a story through its lyrics, and has been described as "nightmarish" in nature. It has been called a "love song of sorts", with influence taken from alternative hip hop group The Pharcyde. Lyrically the track explores a narrative in which the singer meets a girl attempting to pay her way through dental school by working in porn, or at least that's what she told him. Protagonist meets the girl at Coachella, a musical festival which takes place in Indio, California. Ocean serves as the protagonist in the song, in love with a girl "so gone on drugs that Ocean, wanting to be close to her, has no choice but to get gone on those same drugs". The pair get high using dental local anesthetics. Though Ocean serves as an unreliable narrator, Pitchfork wrote that he was "probably still the most reliable character in the whole song." The song contains reference to film director Stanley Kubrick and his 1999 drama Eyes Wide Shut. In addition, it also makes a comparison of the numbness that drugs produce with the use of auto-tune in the music business. Summing up the song, Pitchfork also commented that "Novacane" "is a song about personal connection but also about all the stupid numb human shit that gets in the way of personal connection, which means it's probably the most honest song about personal connection on the radio." Rappers Joe Budden, Tyga and Prodigy have all released freestyles to "Novacane".

== Reception ==
"Novacane" received highly positive reviews from music critics, and has been described as the best song on Nostalgia, Ultra. Pitchfork editor Tom Breihman made the song "Best New Track" and commented that the song had a "stripped-back melodic construction with Ocean crooning over a synthetic backing that practically fades into nonexistence" and that "it draws its power from tiny little details, like throwaway observations or catches in Ocean's voice. Andrew Noz of NPR also praised the details in Ocean's song writing, stating "in 'Novacane,' Ocean sings about falling for a porn star who wants to be a dentist, it's easy to believe that he's more enticed by her dentistry aspirations than her day job. The New York Times critic Jon Caramanica described the song as a "story of meeting a cute girl at Coachella, tripping hard on intoxicants and getting quickly to love that he may or may not remember the next day", and called the song "bliss." Ology writer JT Langley noted that though the song was "massively depressing" and that "Frank makes a foul mouth sound sweeter than your usual R&B through his brand of crooning ... Tricky Stewart's production adds yet another morose element to provide the more macabre side of the drugs-for-love-lost genre."

The song was listed as one of the best songs of the year by several publications. The New York Times placed the song amongst the best tracks of 2011. Pitchfork named the song the 41st best song of the year, musing that "he might be fronting like the Drakes and post-"808s" Kanyes of the world, but there's too much self-effacement happening for Ocean not to realize the inherent humor in his own drama. If Ocean really is on that visionary Kubrick shit like he claims, then "Novacane" could very well be his Dr. Strangelove." Zimbio placed the song at number 2 on their best hip-hop songs of the year list, writing "while every track on his mixtape, nostalgia, Ultra, warrants a listen, it's the radio-friendly "Novacane" that stands out as his most mature and enjoyable song to date." Spin named the song the fifth best of the year, describing the track as "a fully evolved Drake song, where you're slyly immersed in youthful, aww-shit decadence, while simultaneously watching your dreams of recreational stripper booty and complimentary cocaine breakfasts get methodically dismantled."

== Promotion ==
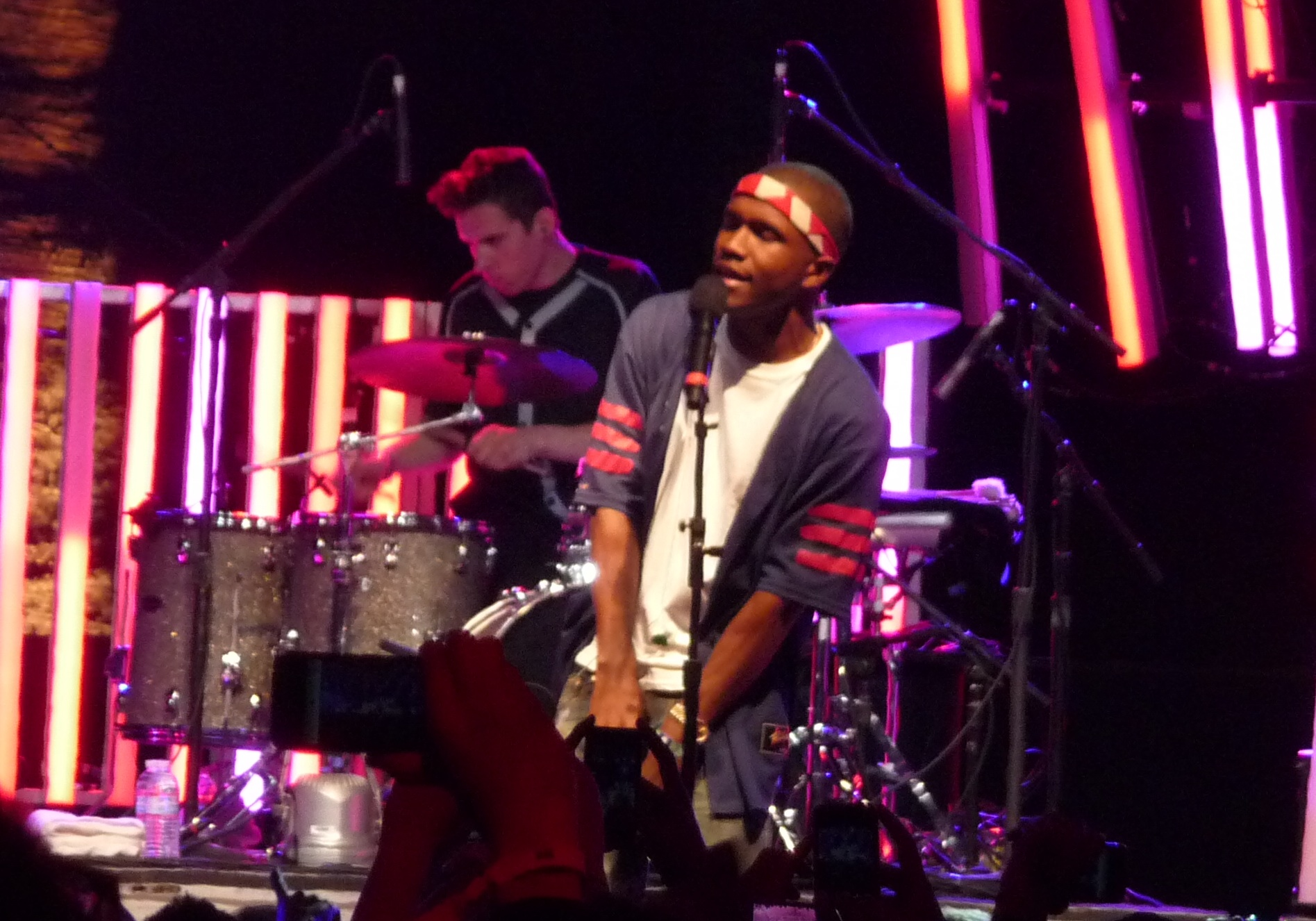
Ocean performing at Coachella in 2012

According to Ocean, the music video for "Novacane" was a simple process. Talking about the concept of the video, he stated "I was just trying to connect or articulate visually the feeling of being numb. The feeling of wanting to feel something you can't feel. A lot of things can cause that numbing, but in the video it was some sort of topical aesthetic and a little bit of special effects." The video doesn't last the entirety of the song, which director Nabil Elderkin stated was for artistic reasons. In an interview with Pitchfork, he reasoned "to me, videos don't always have to be the length of the song. I like the idea of people thinking, 'What was that?'"

The video is shot as one long take, shot in a mostly dark room. Ocean sits in the room, smoking an unspecified drug. Eventually, he gets up and begins to smear an unknown substance onto his face. Random shots of pandas and rain forest imagery are also spliced into the video, and it ends with Ocean being slapped by the ghostly image of a woman and he suddenly becomes a ghostly panda. MTV further summarized the video; "Ocean is surrounded by ghostly incarnations of beautiful women, tigers and pandas. At one point, Ocean smears what appears to be novocaine — or Procaine — on his solemn-looking face." Supposedly, it required several takes to achieve the correct angle for the slapping moment, and the spliced images were placed in the video because Ocean asked the director whether or not they "can we put some kind of Asian-rain-forest stuff in there?" Billboard wrote that the video was "minimalist" and "eerie". Pitchfork named the video amongst the best of the year.

Ocean embarked on a solo tour through North America and Europe to promote both the mixtape and his other musical projects. The set lists to the various shows varied, though "Novacane" was performed at all shows. Ocean performed "Novacane" and "She" with Tyler, The Creator at an OFWGKTA performance in New York City. The track was included during Ocean's setlist at the April 2012 Coachella Musical Festival. Complex magazine stated that he "left his most popular and best for last, wrapping the evening with "Novacane," which shouts out the festival itself." Ocean performed the track during his 14 show Channel Orange tour through North America.

== Personnel ==
- Frank Ocean – vocals
- Christopher "Tricky" Stewart – production, keyboards
- Monte Neuble – keyboards
- Alex Al – bass
- Andrew Wuepper – mixing, recording engineering
- Brian "B-Luv" Thomas – engineering

== Charts ==
=== Weekly ===
Chart (2011)	Peak position
US Billboard Hot 100	82
US Billboard Heatseekers Songs	6
US Billboard Hot R&B/Hip-Hop Songs	17
US Billboard Radio Songs	59

=== Year-end ===
Chart (2011)	Rank
US Billboard Hot R&B/Hip-Hop Songs	84

== Certifications ==
Region	Certification	Certified units/sales
Australia (ARIA)	2× Platinum	140,000^{‡}
Denmark (IFPI Danmark)	Platinum	90,000^{‡}
New Zealand (RMNZ)	3× Platinum	90,000^{‡}
United Kingdom (BPI)	Platinum	600,000^{‡}
United States (RIAA)	Platinum	1,000,000^{‡}
^{‡} Sales+streaming figures based on certification alone.
