= Area21 =

Musical duo consisting of Martin Garrix and Maejor

- Origin: Amsterdam, Netherlands
- Genres: EDM; pop; hip hop; future bass; trap
- Occupations: DJs; record producers
- Years active: 2016–present
- Labels: Stmpd Rcrds; Hollywood; Epic Amsterdam; Sony Netherlands
- Members: Martin Garrix; Maejor

Area21 (stylized in all caps) is a Dutch-American electronic dance music duo consisting of Martin Garrix and Maejor.

== Career ==
Area21 gained popularity after Garrix debuted their song "Spaceships" in his set during Ultra Music Festival 2016 in which Garrix had headlined. The duo is signed to Garrix's record label Stmpd Rcrds. Their identities were previously unknown despite speculations about Garrix being a part of it alongside one or more vocalists. Throughout media and journalism, Area21 has been described as "Martin Garrix's new side project". Their logo consists of two aliens being inside a spaceship. Asher Roth was initially speculated to be the unknown member of the group, however it was later revealed to be Maejor. Their song "Spaceships" peaked on the Spotify Viral 50 chart at number 3. After one year, they released their third single "We Did It" on 23 June 2017.

On 1 December 2017, they released their fourth single "Glad You Came", which originally debuted during Garrix's Ultra Music 2017 set.

On 9 February 2018, Area21 released their fifth single titled "Happy" on Stmpd Rcrds. In a review by Dancing Astronaut's Farrel Sweeney, the track is said to "emit a happy vibe via its simplicity and upbeat nature, as the title conveys".

In April 2018, Garrix teased an unreleased single titled "Help" on Instagram, and it was released on 3 March 2019. Its music video was released on 7 March 2019.

On 24 October 2020, Garrix confirmed during an interview on TikTok that they would release an album in the spring of 2021. On 9 April 2021, Area21 released the single "La La La", off their forthcoming full-length album. The song's music video introduced the animated characters, which are aliens named M and M.

On 21 May 2021, they released the single "Pogo", and then released "Mona Lisa" on 18 June 2021. The track has had over 2.2 million streams on Spotify. Next up for the duo came "Lovin' Every Minute", a track Garrix had first played live in 2018 with fans speculating it to be a release with Justin Bieber; however this was not the case and fans had to wait 3 years for the official release which was by Area21. On 17 September 2021, Area21 released their eleventh single, "Followers", and announced during their first in-person appearance at the iHeartRadio Music Festival that their debut album would be released on 12 November 2021. On 15 October 2021 they released the single "Own the Night". They released their debut album, Greatest Hits Vol. 1, on 12 November 2021.

On 5 April 2023, they released their live album and concert film Live on Planet Earth. The film sees Area21 and a live band performing songs from "Greatest Hits Vol. 1" as well as early tracks like "Spaceships", "We Did It", and "Glad You Came" while expanding on the backstory of the group seen in their music videos.

== Discography ==
=== Albums ===
Title	Details
Greatest Hits Vol. 1	Released: 12 November 2021; Label: Stmpd Rcrds, Hollywood Records; Format: CD, LP, digital download, streaming

=== Singles ===
Title	Year	Album	Label
"Spaceships"	2016	Non-album singles	Stmpd Rcrds; Epic Amsterdam; Sony Netherlands
"Girls"	2016	Non-album singles	Stmpd Rcrds; Epic Amsterdam; Sony Netherlands
"We Did It"	2017	Non-album singles	Stmpd Rcrds; Epic Amsterdam; Sony Netherlands
"Glad You Came"	2017	Non-album singles	Stmpd Rcrds; Epic Amsterdam; Sony Netherlands
"Happy"	2018	Non-album singles	Stmpd Rcrds; Epic Amsterdam; Sony Netherlands
"Help"	2019	Non-album singles	Stmpd Rcrds; Epic Amsterdam; Sony Netherlands
"La La La"	2021	Greatest Hits Vol. 1	Stmpd Rcrds; Hollywood Records
"Pogo"	2021	Greatest Hits Vol. 1	Stmpd Rcrds; Hollywood Records
"Mona Lisa"	2021	Greatest Hits Vol. 1	Stmpd Rcrds; Hollywood Records
"Lovin' Every Minute"	2021	Greatest Hits Vol. 1	Stmpd Rcrds; Hollywood Records
"Followers"	2021	Greatest Hits Vol. 1	Stmpd Rcrds; Hollywood Records
"Own the Night"	2021	Greatest Hits Vol. 1	Stmpd Rcrds; Hollywood Records
