= The DeAndre Way =

Studio album by Soulja Boy
- Released: November 30, 2010
- Recorded: 2009–10
- Genre: Hip hop
- Length: 35:31; 51:17 (deluxe edition)
- Labels: SOD; Collipark; Interscope
- Producers: Soulja Boy(exec.); Rico Beats; Boi-1da; Bei Maejor; Young Yonny; Inertia; G5 Kids

Soulja Boy chronology
iSouljaBoyTellem (2008)	The DeAndre Way (2010)	King Soulja 3 (2014)

Singles from The DeAndre Way
- 1. "Pretty Boy Swag" Released: June 8, 2010; 2. "Blowing Me Kisses" Released: August 31, 2010; 3. "Speakers Going Hammer" Released: October 19, 2010

The DeAndre Way is the third studio album by American rapper Soulja Boy. It was released on November 30, 2010, by his label Stacks on Deck Entertainment, Collipark Music and Interscope Records.

== Background ==
At the time, Soulja Boy stated that he wished to begin working with artists such as Jay-Z and Eminem. Soulja Boy collaborated with American rappers Gucci Mane and Birdman on the track titled "Swag Flu" and also collaborated with Canadian teen pop singer Justin Bieber on the track titled "Rich Girl". Nicki Minaj, Snoop Dogg, 50 Cent, Lil Wayne, Trey Songz, Jamie Foxx, Busta Rhymes, Chris Brown, Ray J, and Arab were in works to be featured on the album, but Trey Songz, 50 Cent, and Arab were the only artists who appear on the album out of those names. SOD's rapper JBar was supposedly to be featured on the album, but did not make the final cut. The track titled "Mean Mug", a collaboration with 50 Cent, was released on September 23.

On April 23, 2011, after the album's release, during an interview with Complex, Way stated his internal disagreements with Interscope influenced the album's disappointing record sales. Way also blamed the timing of the album:

"Honestly, I shut down for a week [after my album dropped], I wasn't talking to nobody, I wasn't talking to management, and I wasn't talking to the label. I wasn't picking up nobody's calls. I went like that for a week. I was in a state of confusion. I needed answers...the label only shipped like 18,000 copies [of the album]. So I wasn't able to do gold first week or even 100k, none of that. They only put like 8,000 units in Best Buy. It was crazy."

Way also stated he felt helpless because of communication with Interscope was lacking, and he believed the label failed to listen to him. He claims his souring relationship with record producer and mentor Mr. Collipark, who for the first time did not do any production work on Way's album, gave him less power to negotiate with record execs.

"When I first started it was Soulja Boy and Collipark. But after my label Stacks on Deck Money Gang Records was established and I started making all these different moves, I started to become a businessman. My label was taking off and I guess I was putting more time and energy into that, than to Collipark. He wasn't feeling that and it just went left. He wanted me to be all for Collipark. So during the third album, I didn't have him there to be able to tell the label to ship 500,000 the first week, or put the single on the radio, or we need this song. So I was basically out there by myself, just hoping the label will do the best they can."

Even though the two have since made up, Way stated that because of the disappointing album sales he was about to give up on his music career, but he didn't because of his other mentor 50 Cent, who was also a guest on the album, told him not to and to keep going.

"50 was like, 'You've got to keep doing what you’re doing. You're Soulja Boy, you're here for a reason. Everybody's not going platinum. Everybody didn't do what you did. Everybody didn't come in on the Internet. You're the one that started the Internet. You're the one that got me on the Internet. You're the one that got us on blogs, on YouTube, and on Twitter.' I was like, 'Man, you know what? You're right.' He wasn't doing nothing but speaking true knowledge to my head and it got me right back in the studio. So I ain't going to never quit. I'm going to stay in this music industry. I'm going to stay making hits, and I'm going to do what I've got to do, and I thank 50. I really needed that at that time."

== Singles ==
"Pretty Boy Swag" was released as the album's lead single on June 8, 2010. The single has reached number 34 on the US Billboard Hot 100, number 6 on the Billboard Hot R&B/Hip-Hop Songs chart and number 5 on the Billboard Rap Songs chart. The single has gone on to sell over 1,000,000 copies.

"Blowing Me Kisses" was released as the album's second single on August 31, 2010.

"Speakers Going Hammer" was released as the album's third single on October 19, 2010.

=== Other songs ===
A video teaser for the deluxe album song "Do It Big" was released in April 2010 to promote the album. Music videos for the tracks "Mean Mug" featuring 50 Cent and "30 Thousand 100 Million" featuring Lil B were both released in November 2010.

== Critical reception ==
Professional ratings
Aggregate scores
Source	Rating
Metacritic	53/100
Review scores
Source	Rating
Allmusic	2.5/5 stars
Entertainment Weekly	3.5/5 stars
HipHopDX	2/5 stars
PopMatters	(4/10)
Rolling Stone	2/5 stars
Slant Magazine	3.5/5 stars
The Washington Post	(favorable)

Upon release, The DeAndre Way received mixed reviews from music critics. However it has garnered better critical reception than Soulja Boy's previous albums. IGN stated "For a party-ready southern hip-hop album it gets the job done, but anyone looking for something more substantial needs to look elsewhere." Slant Magazine contributed, "The DeAndre Way doesn't exactly qualify as substantial growth, but it's another solid effort from an innovative MC who's been unfairly chastised by so many." However Rolling Stone labelled the album "bland and jaundiced", while HipHopDX states that it "lacks any evidence of creativity".

== Commercial performance ==
The DeAndre Way sold 13,400 copies in its first week, which was a significant drop from his previous two albums. The album debuted at number 90 on the US Billboard 200 chart, number 8 on the Top Rap Albums, and number 18 on the R&B/Hip-Hop Albums charts. The album has sold 56,000 copies in the United States, making it Way's lowest-selling album during his tenure with Interscope. It remains his final album to enter any Billboard chart.

== Track listing ==
Standard edition
No.	Title	Writer(s)	Producer(s)	Length
1.	"First Day of School"	DeAndre Way; Braylin Bowman	Resource	3:58
2.	"Touchdown"	Way; Ricardo Lamarre	Rico Beats	3:19
3.	"Hey Cutie" (featuring Trey Songz)	Way; Tremaine Neverson; Ronald Ferebee; Alexander Izquierdo; A. Fountain	Young Yonny	3:15
4.	"Speakers Going Hammer"	Way; Matthew Samuels; Brandon Green	Boi-1da	3:08
5.	"Pretty Boy Swag"	Way; Joshua "G5Kid" Murphy	G5 Kids	3:56
6.	"30 Thousand 100 Million" (featuring Lil B and Arab)	Way; Brandon McCartney; Abrahim "Arab" Mustafa	Soulja Boy	4:03
7.	"Mean Mug" (featuring 50 Cent)	Way; Lamarre; Curtis Jackson	Rico Beats	3:47
8.	"Blowing Me Kisses"	Way; Green	Bei Maejor	3:19
9.	"Fly"	Way; Lamarre	Rico Beats	3:53
10.	"Grammy" (featuring Ester Dean)	Way; Ester Dean; Lamarre	Rico Beats	2:53
Total length:				35:31

Deluxe edition (bonus tracks)
No.	Title	Writer(s)	Producer(s)	Length
11.	"Steez"	Way; Bowman	Resource	4:29
12.	"Boom"	Way; Clinton Sparks; Green	Clinton Sparks	3:24
13.	"Do It Big"	Way; C. Wilson	Inertia	4:04
14.	"Xtra"	Way; Bowman	Resource	3:49
Total length:				51:17

== Cast ==
Soulja Boy as Jehu Jackson

Chris Brown as Micheal Pastel

Nicki Minaj as Olivia Cooper

Donald Glover as Renard Ram

Big Sean as Coby Jackson

Boi-1da as Jaylen Jackson

Wesley Matthews as Nathan Stacey

Walt Frazier as Harold Epps

Khalid Reeves as Cameron Jackson, Jehu’s Dad

John Wallace as Amare Thomas

Neymar as Aaron Hepps

== Charts ==
Chart (2010)	Peak position
US Billboard 200	90
US Top R&B/Hip-Hop Albums (Billboard)	18
US Top Rap Albums (Billboard)	8

== Release history ==
List of release dates, showing country, record label, and formats released
Region	Date	Format	Label	Edition
France	November 27, 2010	CD, digital download	Universal	Standard, Deluxe
United States	November 30, 2010	CD, digital download	Interscope	Standard, Deluxe
Canada	November 30, 2010	CD, digital download	Interscope	Standard, Deluxe
United Kingdom	November 30, 2010	CD, digital download	Universal	Standard, Deluxe
Germany	December 4, 2010	CD, digital download	Universal	Standard, Deluxe
