= She Make It Clap =

2021 single by Soulja Boy

Single by Soulja Boy
- Released: March 15, 2021
- Recorded: 2021
- Genre: Trap
- Length: 1:51
- Label: SODMG; Virgin Music
- Songwriters: DeAndre Way; Carter Britz
- Producer: Fantom

Soulja Boy singles chronology
| "Cut Dat Check" (2020) | "She Make It Clap" (2021) | "Rick & Morty" (2021) |

Music video
- "She Make It Clap" on YouTube

"She Make It Clap" is a single by American rapper Soulja Boy. The song was initially self-released on March 15, 2021, before seeing a wider global release under Virgin Music on April 5, 2021. Following its release, the song gained tens of millions of plays across streaming platforms, while also reaching number 23 on the US Billboard Mainstream R&B/Hip-Hop Airplay, as well as both the US and Global Billboard Top Triller charts.

Soulja Boy previewed two unreleased remixes of the song, one with French Montana, and the other with Nicki Minaj during a live Verzuz match with American rapper Bow Wow

== Production ==
According to Soulja Boy, the song was recorded during a live Twitch broadcast as a freestyle, on his personal computer.

== Dance and music video ==
Soulja Boy originally self-promoted the song on the video-sharing platform TikTok by doing an assortment of short dances to the beginning of the song, eventually fleshing out the dance and starting a viral trend on both the TikTok and Triller platforms, accumulating millions of views on both the original videos and various user-made video replies.

The music video was directed by Dale Resteghini. It begins with Soulja Boy making a video call to a friend on his cellphone to tell him the song has gone viral; it then moves on to show Soulja Boy, accompanied by several celebrities and TikTok users, as well as many women in bikinis, performing the dance to the song in various locations both in and outside a luxury mansion. The video premiered on YouTube on April 30, 2021. The video features rappers Desiigner, Chief Keef, and several female dancers doing the dance from the viral TikTok videos.

== Charts ==
Chart performance for "She Make It Clap"
| Chart (2021) | Peak position |
|---|---|
| US Mainstream R&B/Hip-Hop Airplay (Billboard) | 23 |

== Certifications ==
Certifications for "She Make It Clap"
| Region | Certification | Certified units/sales |
|---|---|---|
| Brazil (Pro-Música Brasil) | Gold | 20,000^{‡} |
^{‡} Sales+streaming figures based on certification alone.
