= Lolly (song) =

Single by Maejor Ali featuring Juicy J and Justin Bieber
- Released: September 17, 2013
- Recorded: 2012
- Genre: Pop rap; dirty rap
- Length: 3:45
- Label: Island Def Jam
- Songwriters: Jordan Houston; Brandon Green; Tony Scales; Justin Bieber; Robert Williams; Ronald M. Ferebee, Jr.; Brandon Bell
- Producers: Maejor; Young Yonny; Bell; Kyren Eaddy; Chef Tone

Maejor Ali singles chronology
"Lights Down Low" (2012)	"Lolly" (2013)	"Tell Daddy" (2014)

Juicy J singles chronology
"Clappers" (2013)	"Lolly" (2013)	"Dark Horse" (2013)

Justin Bieber singles chronology
"thatPower" (2013)	"Lolly" (2013)	"Heartbreaker" (2013)

Music video
- "Lolly" on YouTube

"Lolly" is a song by American recording artist and record producer Maejor Ali (also known as Bei Maejor). The song, released as a single on September 17, 2013, features vocals from American rapper Juicy J and Canadian singer Justin Bieber. The song peaked 19 on the US Billboard Hot 100 chart. This is the first commercial song in which Justin Bieber raps.

== Music video ==
The music video, directed by Matt Alonzo, shows Maejor Ali and Justin Bieber performing in a neon studio full of enthusiastic dancers and lollipop lickers. Juicy J is also featured in the video.

== Critical reception ==
Kia Makarechi said the song "uses a worn-out metaphor for penis as the focal point of a brag track about how much the ladies love ... sucking on their respective ... 'lollies'" which they rhyme with "molly", a generic slang term for club drugs.

== Track listing ==
No.	Title	Length
1.	"Lolly" (Edited)	3:45
2.	"Lolly" (Explicit)	3:45
3.	"Lolly" (Remix) (featuring Vito)	3:45

== Charts ==
Chart performance
Chart (2013)	Peak position
Australia (ARIA)	98
Australian Urban (ARIA)	15
Belgium (Ultratop 50 Flanders)	42
Belgium (Ultratop 50 Wallonia)	49
Canada Hot 100 (Billboard)	27
Denmark (Tracklisten)	8
France (SNEP)	119
Netherlands (Single Top 100)	68
Scotland Singles (OCC)	70
Sweden (Sverigetopplistan)	57
UK Singles (OCC)	56
UK Hip Hop/R&B (OCC)	11
US Billboard Hot 100	19
US Hot R&B/Hip-Hop Songs (Billboard)	5

== Certifications ==
Certifications
Region	Certification	Certified units/sales
Brazil (Pro-Música Brasil)	Platinum	60,000^{‡}
Streaming
Denmark (IFPI Danmark)	Gold	900,000^{†}
^{‡} Sales+streaming figures based on certification alone.^{†} Streaming-only figures based on certification alone.
