= Southern Utah International Documentary Film Festival =

American film festival

DOCUTAH International Documentary Film Festival
- Official 2010 poster
- Location: St. George, Utah, United States
- Hosted by: Utah Tech University
- Language: International
- Website: https://www.docutah.com/

The DOCUTAH International Documentary Film Festival is an annual film festival, held in the Fall, that strives to recognize some of the best in international documentary films. Hosted by Utah Tech University (UT; formerly known as Dixie State University/DSU.) the festival screens films at the Red Cliffs Theater behind the Red Cliffs Mall in St. George, Utah, with special events throughout Southern Utah. DOCUTAH, also, has an educational focus, and features “master class educational seminars.”

== History ==
Utah Tech University, then known as DSU, founded DOCUTAH in 2010. From the beginning, this festival has aimed to provide attendees with not only a meaningful film-going experience, but also an educational one through its “master class educational seminars.”

The originator of the festival idea, Phil Tuckett, serves as the director of DSU Films. When he returned to his junior college (DSU) in 2006, after 38 years of working for NFL Films and receiving 30 Emmy Awards, he felt that the southern Utah area would serve as the perfect place to hold an international documentary film festival.

After working for several months to make his vision come to fruition, Tuckett officially announced DOCUTAH on 24 September 2009.

The City of St. George, the St. George Convention and Tourism office, the City of Kanab, and Kane County’s Office of Tourism and Film Commission (along with the Center for Education, Business, and the Arts) were some of the first to support and sponsor DOCUTAH.

== Structure ==
The festival runs for 7 days annually, in the fall.

=== Screenings ===
The festival screens films at the Red Cliffs Theater behind Red Cliffs Mall and the Eccles Performing Arts Center at Utah Tech University, with various locations for special events. Special events location involves the O.C. Tanner Amphitheater in Springdale, UT.

=== DOCtalks ===
Film industry professionals are scheduled to talk about their experiences and the process of making films.

=== Film Categories ===
DOCUTAH has two separate film entry categories, one for general entrants and one for students. These both have sub-categories.

General:

- Short documentaries up to 45 minutes (including titles and credits)
- Features more than 45 minutes

Student:

- College/University Student Film

=== Awards ===
Six judges make up the DOCUTAH awards panel.

They confer the honors for the following categories:

- Best Feature
- Best Short
- Audience Favorite- Feature
- Audience Favorite- Short
- Best Foreign Film
- Emerging Artist
- Humanitarian
- President's Award
- Dean's Award
- Mayor's Award

== See also ==
Utah Tech University
