= Lights Down Low (Bei Maejor song) =

Single by Bei Maejor featuring Waka Flocka Flame
- Released: March 23, 2012
- Recorded: 2011
- Genre: R&B; pop rap
- Length: 3:06
- Label: RCA
- Songwriter(s): Brandon Green; Juaquin Malphurs
- Producer(s): Bei Maejor

Bei Maejor singles chronology
"Trouble" (2011)	"Lights Down Low" (2012)	"Lolly" (2013)

Waka Flocka Flame singles chronology
"I Don't Really Care" (2012)	"Lights Down Low" (2012)	"All You" (2012)

Music video
- "Lights Down Low" on YouTube

"Lights Down Low" is a song by American singer, songwriter and record producer Bei Maejor. The song, released on March 23, 2012 as a non-album single. The song features rapper Waka Flocka Flame, and was produced by Maejor himself. Maejor recruited Siraaj Amnesia James (Encore) for the song's live horns, heard towards the end of Waka Flocka's verse.

== Music video ==
The music video was released on May 22, 2012.

== Chart performance ==
The song first charted on the week of March 19, 2012, on the US Hot R&B/Hip-Hop Songs at number eighty-five. It has since peaked at number sixty-eight.

=== Charts ===
Chart (2012)	Peak position
US Billboard Hot R&B/Hip-Hop Songs	68

== Release history ==
Country	Date	Format	Label
United States	March 23, 2012	Digital download	RCA Records
