= Trouble (Bei Maejor song) =

Single by Bei Maejor featuring J. Cole
- Released: August 12, 2011
- Recorded: 2011
- Genre: R&B
- Length: 3:33
- Label: Jive
- Songwriters: Brandon Green, Jermaine Cole
- Producer: Bei Maejor

Bei Maejor singles chronology
"Trouble" (2011)	"Lights Down Low" (2012)

J. Cole singles chronology
"Work Out" (2011)	"Trouble" (2011)	"Only Wanna Give It to You" (2011)

Music video
- "Trouble" on YouTube

"Trouble" is the debut single by American singer, songwriter and record producer Bei Maejor, released on August 12, 2011 as a digital download. The song features American rapper J. Cole and was produced by Maejor himself.

== Remix ==
The official remix was released on December 25, 2011, featuring American R&B singers T-Pain and Trey Songz along with rappers Wale and J. Cole. The remix was released on January 4, 2012 as a digital download single on iTunes and Amazon.

There is an additional version of the remix that replaces J. Cole's verse with a verse by rapper Nelly. That version was released on January 7, 2012.

== Music video ==
On August 28, 2011, behind-the-scenes pictures of the music video were released. This was the first video Maejor did for his label Jive Records. The video was directed by Declan Whitebloom and features Maejor being tested by temptation. The Detroit R&B recording artist tries to resist all the ladies, performing in a bedroom while girls crawl around the house, the pool, and even in his ride. The video was released September 19, 2011.

== Chart performance ==
The song first charted on the week of August 2, 2011, on the Hot R&B/Hip-Hop Songs at number ninety-seven. It has since peaked at number thirty-four.

=== Charts ===
Chart (2011)	Peak position
US Billboard Hot R&B/Hip-Hop Songs	34

== Release history ==
Country	Date	Format	Label	Ref
United States	August 12, 2011	Digital download	Jive Records	
