= Maejor =

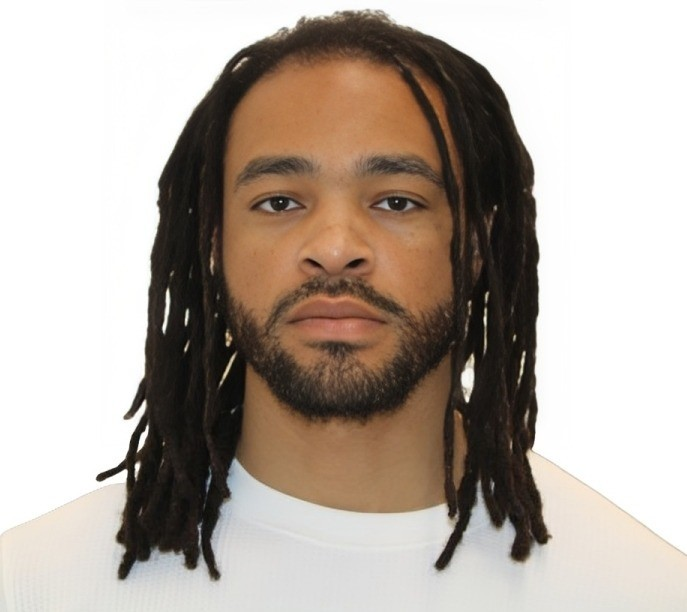
- Maejor in 2025

Background information
- Also known as: Bei Maejor; Maejor Ali
- Born: Brandon Michael Green; July 23, 1988 (age 38); Southfield, Michigan, U.S.
- Origin: Detroit, Michigan, U.S.
- Genres: R&B; pop
- Occupations: Record producer; rapper; singer; songwriter
- Years active: 2005–present
- Works: Discography; production
- Labels: Intentional Media; Virgin EMI; First of the Month; Def Jam; RCA; Jive
- Member of: Area21
- Website: maejor.com

Brandon Michael Green (born July 23, 1988), known professionally as Maejor (formerly Bei Maejor and later Maejor Ali), is an American record producer, rapper and singer. Green is known for his production and songwriting work for music industry artists—most notably Canadian singer Justin Bieber. He is one half of the EDM duo Area21, which he formed in 2016 alongside Dutch DJ Martin Garrix.

As an R&B recording artist, Green signed with Jive Records in 2010. His 2011 single, "Trouble" (featuring J. Cole), entered the Hot R&B/Hip-Hop Songs, along with his 2012 single "Lights Down Low" (featuring Waka Flocka Flame). He parted ways with Jive in favor of Def Jam Recordings; the label released his 2013 single "Lolly" (featuring Juicy J and Justin Bieber), which peaked at number 19 on the Billboard Hot 100. After various label shakeups, he signed with Virgin EMI Records in 2018 and shifted further into EDM and world music, tuning his releases to scientific pitches and frequencies. His debut studio album, Vol. 1: Frequencies (2020), was claimed by Green to contain "healing frequencies."

In addition to producing music for national campaigns including Pepsi and the Boston Celtics, Green has also contributed to the film soundtracks for Bratz: The Movie (2007), The Princess and the Frog (2009) and Think Like a Man (2012), as well as the video game music for NBA 2K and FIFA. He has received a Grammy Award nomination.

== Early life ==
Maejor was born in Southfield, Michigan. He graduated from the University of Michigan. He then relocated to Atlanta to further his professional career, signing with Ne-Yo's Compound Entertainment.

== Career ==
Maejor released his first mixtape Upside Down, which features appearances from Keri Hilson, Trey Songz, Drake and T-Pain. He also lent his vocal and production skills on the official remix of Ciara's "Ride", with André 3000 and Ludacris.

Maejor first major production was Bun B's 2005 album Trill, released during his attendance at the University of Michigan in Ann Arbor. The album yielded his first gold certification by the Recording Industry Association of America (RIAA). In 2010, Maejor was nominated for a Grammy Award, for his work on Trey Songz's album Passion, Pain & Pleasure, and once more in 2011, for Monica's Still Standing. In 2012, Maejor produced two songs on Justin Bieber's album Believe as well as the single "Say Somethin" by Austin Mahone.

Maejor's 2012 single "Lights Down Low" was used as the official soundtrack in the NBA Playoffs for the Boston Celtics. He also produced the national campaign commercial for Pepsi in 2010 and 2013. He teamed with Justin Bieber again in 2013, co-producing his single "Heartbreaker". In 2013, Maejor also released the single "Lolly", featuring Juicy J, which peaked at number 19 on the US Billboard Hot 100 chart. He co-wrote and produced three songs on Justin Bieber's 2015 Grammy Award-nominated album Purpose.

Maejor co-performed and co-wrote the 2017 single "Vai Malandra" alongside Anitta and Zaac, which released on December 18 of that year. "Vai Malandra" received more than 1 million plays on Spotify on its first day of release and broke the record for the most streams received in a day in Brazil – held previously by Taylor Swift's "Look What You Made Me Do". On its second day of release, the song was played more than 2 million times, surpassing the record for the most streamed song in a day in Brazil. Due to the amount of streams received on its first days of release, the song debuted on the Global Top 50 chart in Spotify and became the first song in Portuguese to hit the Top 20 on that chart on December 20, 2017.

=== AREA21 and EDM collaborations ===
In 2016, Maejor co-founded the EDM duo AREA21 with Dutch DJ Martin Garrix. Maejor provided vocals, songwriting, and co-production on singles such as "Spaceships", "We Did It", "Glad You Came", and "La La La". Their debut album Greatest Hits Vol. 1 was released in 2021 alongside an animated visual series. He performs on stage with Martin Garrix occasionally most recent in India in 2025.

=== Sound projects and global collaborations ===
==== Inner World (2020) ====
Maejor was a contributor to Inner World, the debut music album by the 14th Dalai Lama, released in July 2020. The album debuted at number one on the Billboard New Age chart and combined spiritual teachings with ambient instrumentation.

==== Frequency albums ====
Maejor released two solo projects exploring therapeutic sound frequencies: Vol. 1: Frequency (2020) and Vol. 1.1: Frequency (2021). Both albums feature tones such as 432 Hz and 528 Hz.

=== 2022: Maejor Frequency podcast ===
In 2022, Maejor launched the Audible Original podcast Maejor Frequency. The 10-episode series featured immersive sound design, global travel, and field recordings. Guests included Martin Garrix, Rohan Marley, White Sun, and Boi-1da.

The podcast received:

- Adweek Podcast of the Year (2022)
- Best New Podcast
- Best Travel Podcast
- Best Creativity Podcast
- NAACP Image Award nomination
- Ambie Award nomination for Best Sound Design

It reached the Top 5 on Audible's podcast charts.

=== 2024: Frequency School and Guinness World Record ===
In 2024, Maejor co-founded Frequency School, an initiative integrating sound healing into education. Its pilot program launched at Aiglon College in Switzerland.

In 2025, the school released the song "195", featuring 195 women from each UN-recognized nation saying the word "equality" in their native language. The track was composed using 528 Hz frequencies and natural sounds, and it premiered at the World Economic Forum in Davos Switzerland.

The project received a Guinness World Record for "Most nationalities contributing vocals to a single musical recording".

=== 2025: Dalai Lama 90th birthday tribute ===
Maejor produced a special 444 Hz musical tribute for the Dalai Lama's 90th birthday. The composition was presented as part of formal global celebrations marking the occasion.

=== 2025: Production on Justin Bieber SWAG and SWAG II Albums ===
In 2025, Maejor contributed to Justin Bieber’s albums Swag (Justin Bieber album) and Swag II. He produced the track “Forgiveness,” performed by Marvin Winans with additional vocals by Bieber. Maejor also co-produced “Poppin’ My Shii,” a track on Swag II featuring rapper Hurricane Chris.

Both contributions reflected Maejor's ongoing exploration of musical frequency theory. These credits are linked to a new artistic identity Maejor has referred to as “Frequency Magic,” describing his approach to integrating favorable frequencies into mainstream music. The foundational idea behind Frequency Magic is rooted in the theory that certain frequencies can have healing or consciousness-altering effects.

=== Recent Work: Frequency Magic Methodology ===
Frequency Magic is a music production methodology developed by Maejor that focuses on the optimization of sonic frequencies across both individual tracks and entire albums. The technique involves harmonizing audio elements—such as vocals, instrumentation, and ambient textures—at tuning frequencies believed to enhance emotional and energetic resonance.

== Discography ==
- Vol 1: Frequency (2020)
- Vol 1.1: Frequency (2021)
