= Memento mori (disambiguation) =

The Latin quote Memento mori means "remember (that you have) to die" and is a reminder of the inevitability of death. It is a common motif in art.

Memento mori may also refer to:

== Anime ==
- "Memento Mori", a Eureka Seven episode
- "Memento Mori", a Linebarrels of Iron episode
- "Memento Mori", a Negima! episode
- Memento Mori, a satellite weapon used by A-Laws in Mobile Suit Gundam 00's 2nd season
- "Memento Mori", an episode of Death Parade
- "Memento Mori", a Fairy Tail episode
- "Memento Mori", a Undead Unluck episode

== Film and television ==
- Memento Mori (film), a 1999 South Korean horror movie
- "Memento Mori" (The X-Files), an episode from season 4 of the TV series The X-Files
- ""Memento Mori" (Stargate SG-1)", an episode from Stargate SG-1
- "Memento Mori", a 1992 TV film that was part of the British anthology series Screen Two—directed by Jack Clayton, starring Maggie Smith
- ""Memento Mori" (The Punisher)", an episode from The Punisher
- "Memento Mori", an episode from season 6 of The 100 TV series
- "Memento Mori", an episode from season 1 of British-Irish period crime drama Miss Scarlet and The Duke
- "Memento Mori" (Star Trek: Strange New Worlds), an episode of the first season of Star Trek: Strange New Worlds
- Memento mori (TV series), a 2023 Spanish crime thriller TV series
- "Memento Mori," an episode from season 16 of Criminal Minds

== Games ==
- Memento Mori (video game)
- Requiem: Memento Mori, an online role-playing game
- Memento Mori, a unique kill animation in the online horror game Dead by Daylight
- Memento Mori, a Japanese online AFKRPG mobile game by Bank of Innovation, released in October 2022.
- Memento Mori appears in the opening movie of Persona 3

== Literature ==
- Memento Mori (novel), a novel by Muriel Spark
- "Memento Mori" (short story), a short story by Jonathan Nolan and basis for the 2000 Christopher Nolan film Memento

== Music ==
- Memento Mori (band)
- Memento Mori (Sculthorpe), orchestral composition
- Memento Mori (radio show), a radio show by Canadian musician the Weeknd

=== Albums ===
- Memento Mori (The Bastard Fairies album)
- Memento Mori (Buck-Tick album)
- Memento Mori (Depeche Mode album)
- Memento Mori (Flyleaf album)
- Memento Mori (Gemini Syndrome album)
- Memento Mori, an album by Aviv Geffen
- Memento Mori, an album by Barry Adamson
- Memento Mori, an EP by High Dependency Unit
- Memento Mori, the fifteenth studio album by Marduk
- Memento Mori (Sahg album)
- Memento Mori (Feuerschwanz Album)

=== Songs ===
- "Memento Mori", by The Agonist from Once Only Imagined
- "Memento Mori", by Anathema from Pentecost III
- "Memento Mori", by Architects from All Our Gods Have Abandoned Us by Architects
- "Memento Mori", by The Human Abstract from The Human Abstract by The Human Abstract
- "Memento Mori", by Kamelot from The Black Halo
- "Memento Mori", by Keldian from Journey of Souls
- "Memento Mori", by Lamb of God from Lamb of God
- "Memento Mori", by Moonspell from Memorial
- "Memento Mori", by Matmosfrom A Chance to Cut Is a Chance to Cure
- "Memento Mori", by Patti Smith from Peace and Noise
- "Memento Mori", by Polyphia from Remember That You Will Die
- "Memento Mori", by Reaper from Hell Starts With an H
- "Momento Mori", by Rudimentary Peni from Cacophony
- "Memento Mori", by The Streets from The Hardest Way to Make an Easy Living
- "Memento Mori", by Wolves at the Gate from Wasteland
- "Memento Mori", by Crywank from Tomorrow Is Nearly Yesterday and Everyday Is Stupid
- "Memento Mori", by Rogue Wave from Delusions of Grand Fur
- "Memento Mori: the most important thing in the world", by Will Wood from The Normal Album
- "Hana (Mémento Mori)", by Mr. Children

== See also ==
- Memento (disambiguation)
- Momento (disambiguation)
