= Alexandre Destrez =

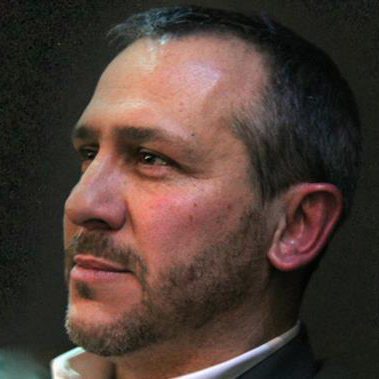

Background information
- Born: 29 May 1969 (age 57); France
- Genres: Electro Jazz, Acid Jazz, Nu-Jazz, Electronic music
- Occupations: Pianist; Composer; Arranger
- Instrument: Piano
- Years active: since 1995
- Website: Alexandre Destrez.com

Alexandre Destrez (born 29 May 1969) is a French pianist, keyboardist, composer and musical arranger. He is particularly well known for his musical collaboration on the Tourist and Boulevard albums of St. Germain.

== Biography ==
Son of the French actor and director Thierry Destrez, Alexandre grew up in the western suburbs of Paris. He became interested in music at the age of nine, teaching himself to play on his mother's old piano and continuing to be self-taught for several years. Following a "self-directed" scolarity, Destrez decided to concentrate entirely on his music to the exclusion of everything else. He left home and for several years earned his living by doing casual jobs while still focusing on the piano.

At the age of 20, he began studying at the American School of Modern Music to deepen his knowledge of harmony, composition and arrangement. But it was his meeting with Philippe Bestion which was to have a profound impact on Destrez, enabling him to perfect his sense of improvisation and also discover such artists as Bill Evans, McCoy Tyner, Keith Jarrett and Herbie Hancock.

At 23, Destrez embarked on his first concert tour alongside a French song artist. One year later, he was spotted by Ludovic Navarre, (alias St. Germain) with whom he recorded "Deep in it" which figures on the album Boulevard (F Communications). In 1996, he made a European concert tour with St. Germain and continued to collaborate with him over several years. His phrasing and sense of melody have become key values, particularly on the album Tourist (Blue Note Records), which sold over three million copies worldwide. It was also rated best selling jazz album on its release in the US and awarded 3 "Victoires de la Musique" in France.

Since then, Destrez has collaborated with numerous artists and has participated in diverse musical projects as composer, co-composer and/or instrumentalist (Shazz, Overhead, Oscar, Anthony Fletcher, Martin Solveig, Dimitri from Paris, DJ Yass...)

Since 2012, Destrez is working on his new electro jazz project Rive Gauche from which the first EP Walking... was released in 2016 on BBE records label. Since the end of 2012, he has been performing throughout France accompanied by his musicians.

== Musical collaborations ==
=== Main collaborations ===
In 1995, Destrez recorded "Deep In It" and "Street Scene" (4 SHAZZ) on St. Germain's album Boulevard. This was followed by several years of collaboration with Ludovic Navarre, starting from the 1996 concert tour in France and Europe up to the recording of the Tourist album (Blue Note records) in 2001.

Simultaneously, using the pseudonym Alejandro Del Abelgam, he became the accomplice of another phenomenon of the French House scene: Shazz. He participated in the first eponymous album Shazz nominated in the French award ceremony "Victoires de la musique" then at the EP "El Camino Project" (Yellow Prod) and appeared for the first time as artist on the maxi vinyl Shazz & Alexandre Destrez, Hermosa Maria (Epic Records). They went on to jointly produce two titles for Aco, a young singer well known in Japan. In 2001, the second album from Shazz, In the light (Epic Records) came out, on which Destrez composed, arranged, interpreted and collaborated with Shazz and directed the musicians during recording sessions. In 2004, on a third album entitled Beautiful, (Ulm/Universal), Destrez can be heard performing in an even more developed jazz style on a track of the same name.

In 2000, Destrez met the group Overhead and became its keyboard player, signing up as artist with Naïve Records. The group's first album Silent Witness was acclaimed unanimously by the press. (Les Inrockuptibles, Libération, "ffff" Télérama). Two important events for the group were the concert at "La Cigale" and a concert on one of Bernard Lenoir's 'Black Sessions' programmes dedicated to Overhead and broadcast live on France Inter.

In 2002, David Hachour and Florent Sabaton (alias Oscar), in need of a pianist for their first concert at the Rex Club, contacted Destrez. He went on to join the group and collaborated on several Maxi vinyls and two albums from Oscar: Parisian Soul (2003) and Portrait Robot (2004) with Denote Records. In 2004, Alex composed and interpreted Echoes and Echoes Extended Version (piano solo) for Oscar and Blanck Project respectively. He featured alongside Oscar on the track "Mon plus beau matin" (additional track on the Japanese version of the album Portrait Robot).

He also signed up with Shazz for his first remix "Latin Break revisited by Alexandre Destrez" (2005 Universal Music ULM). In 2005, Destrez composed and collaborated with David H. on the music of Alabama 65, a project inspired by a cappella recordings made in 1948 of Afro-Americans incarcerated in Alabama. In 2007, the maxi vinyl of Oscar was released featuring Destrez on Silent Day (Denote Records).

Destrez also appeared alongside Anthony Fletcher with the release in 2009 of the album Anthony Fletcher Paris. This was followed by a concert tour in France and a live performance on Stéphane Bern's programme Le Fou du Roi on France Inter. Another album "I Guess" was released in 2011.

Since 2005, Destrez has collaborated with the DJ producer Yass and has released over twenty maxi vinyl albums and remixes including:

- Inner Soul "Support your Dj" (Deeply Rooted House - 2005)
- Ziggy Funk ft Taliwa "Everyday" (Yass classic mix - Foliage - 2011)
- Rocco Feat Akram "Working Hard" (Yass remix-House Afrika - 2012)
- Yass & Rony Breaker feat. Nickson Phala "African Woman" (Foliage - 2013)
- Djeff Afrozila & Hallex M feat. Mr V "Let’s Get It" (Sole Channel - 2013)

Destrez has regularly accompanied Yass on keyboard during his concerts in Paris (2007), Pragues (2011), Budapest (2012), Tbilissi (2012), Tbilissi (2013), Varsovie (2013), Tbilissi (2013) Thonon-les-Bains (2013), Batumi (2013) and Marrakech (2014).

=== Collaborations as an instrumentalist ===
==== Studio pianist and keyboardist ====
- Dimitri From Paris on the remix of Móa "Joy Pain" (1998) and on the album of Bran Van 3000 "Discosis" (2001)
- Martin Solveig on the cover version of "Requiem Pour Un Con" (Serge Gainsbourg) on the album "Hedonist" (Universal Music - 2005) - nomination aux Victoires de la Musique.
- Julien Baer on the album "Notre Dame des Limites" (2005)

==== Stage pianist and keyboardist ====
Nelly Mella: (Procédé Guimard Delaunay - PGD)

- Preview of the concert tour L’Estival (La Clef - St Germain en Laye - 2005)
- Public recording of the album "Les Signes" at Jean Vilar Theatre (Marly-le-Roi - 2005)
- Concert at the Théâtre du Rond-Point (Paris - 2006)

David Grumel

- Festival Musilac (Aix les Bains – 2006)
- Le Brise Glace (Annecy - 2007)

Tania de Montaigne: at L’Européen and at the Réservoir (Paris – 2007) - with guests: Jo Wedin and Bibi Tanga singing, Martin Bauer on the viola da gamba

E.T. on the Beach:

- at "La CLEF" (Saint-Germain-en-Laye - March 2011) - guest Sodadeth San
- at the "Vingtième Théâtre" (Paris - May 2011) guests: Sodadeth San, Phoebe Killdeer (Nouvelle Vague) et Olivier Coursier (AaRON)

=== Original film soundtracks ===
- "Le Ciel, les Oiseaux et... ta mère !" directed by Djamel Bensalah (1999) – The title "Hermosa Maria" by Shazz & Alexandre Destrez
- "Sauve-moi" directed by Christian Vincent (2000) – Piano recording of music by Philippe Cohen Solal (Gotan Project)
- "Chaos" (Coline Serreau) (2001) – recording with Ludovic Navarre (St. Germain) of the original soundtrack (released in 2002)

== Selected discography and concerts (by artist) ==
=== With St. Germain ===
- 1995: Album "Boulevard" (F Com)
- 1996: Concert tour in France and Europe
- 1997: St. Germain Remix Pierre Henry "Messe Pour Le Temps Présent" (Polygram)
- 1999: "From Detroit to St Germain" (F Com)
- 2001: Album "Tourist" (Blue Note Records) - 3 Victoires de la Musique – N°1 best selling jazz album in the USA
- 2002: Original film soundtrack of "CHAOS" (Coline Serreau)
- 2012: Album "Tourist remasterisé"

=== With Shazz ===
- 1998: Eponymous album "Shazz"(Columbia) – Nomination at the Victoires de la Musique
- 2001: Album "In The Light"(Epic Records)
- 2001: Maxi vinyl recording of Shazz & Alexandre Destrez "Hermosa Maria" (Sony Music)
- 2002: Remix album "In The Night" (Epic Records)
- 2004: Shazz "Beautiful"(ULM)
- 2005: Human ? (Naïve Records)
- 2008: Concert in St.Petersburg and Moscow with Stéphane Pompougnac for the compilation "Hôtel Costes Volume 11"
- 2009: Album "Heritage" (Pschent) - Concert at the Midem in Cannes

=== With Dimitri from Paris ===
- 1998: Remix of MOA "Joy Pain" (Tommy Boy)
- 2001: Featuring on the album of Bran Van 3000 "Discosis"

=== With Overhead ===
- 2002: Album "Silent Witness" (Naïve Records) - ffff Télérama - Concert at the TransMusicales in Rennes
- Live concert broadcast on France Inter for one of Bernard Lenoir's "Black Sessions shows"
- Concert at La Cigale for the "Festival des Inrockuptibles"

=== With Oscar ===
- 2002: Concert at the "Rex Club" in Paris
- 2003: Album "Parisian Soul" (Denote Records) and concerts in France and Belgium
- 2004: Album "Portrait Robot" (Denote Records) and concerts at the "FrancoPhonic Festival" in Berlin and the "FrancoFolies de La Rochelle"

=== With Martin Solveig ===
- 2005: Album "Hedonist" (Universal) nominated at the Victoires de la Musique

=== With Anthony Fletcher ===
- 2009: Eponymous album "Anthony Fletcher Paris"
- French tour and live concert during the Stéphane Bern programme "Le Fou du Roi" broadcast on "France Inter"
- 2011: Album "I Guess"

=== With DJ Yass ===
Over twenty singles and remix albums made since 2005 as pianist, composer or producer, including:

- 2011: Remix "Everyday" (Foliage)
- 2012: Remix "Working Hard" (House Afrika)
- 2013: "Bring it Up" (Kingstreet) / "Who You Are" (Purple Music) / "African Woman" (Foliage) / "Z-Tribute" (Street King) / Remix "Let’s Get It" (Sole Channel)
- 2014: Concert with Dj Yass et Jay Sebag (singer on songs of Martin Solveig) au SO Night Lounge Marrakech
- Since 2001: Concerts in Prague, Budapest, Warsaw, Tbilissi, Batumi (Georgia 2014–2015), Termoli (Italia 2015) Varna (Bulgaria 2014–2015), Sofia (Bulgaria 2015)

=== With David H ===
- 2005: Creation of the "Alabama 65" project
- 2012: Creation of "RIVE GAUCHE" electro jazz project
- 2012: Concerts with RIVE GAUCHE at the Electro Jazz Festival" in Megève (Haute-Savoie, France)
- 2013: Concerts with RIVE GAUCHE at the Silvain Theatre in Marseille (Festival Borderline - May 2013)
- 2014: Concerts with RIVE GAUCHE at Magazine Club of Lille (France)
- 2015: Concerts with RIVE GAUCHE at the Jazz Festival Eclats d'Email of Limoges (France)
- 2016: Release of the first EP with RIVE GAUCHE Walking... on BBE records label
