= Culpo =

Culpo is a surname. Notable people with the surname include:

- Christopher Culpo, American-French composer and pianist
- Olivia Culpo (born 1992), American model, actress, and Internet celebrity
- Vittorio Culpo (1904–1955), Italo-French resistance soldier
