= Boulevard (St Germain album) =

Studio album by St Germain
- Released: 28 July 1995
- Genres: Acid jazz; nu jazz; deep house; dub
- Length: 75:10
- Label: F Communications
- Producer: Ludovic Navarre

St Germain chronology
Boulevard (1995)	From Detroit to St Germain (1999)

Boulevard is the debut studio album by French DJ and record producer Ludovic Navarre under the stage name St Germain. It was released in 1995 through F Communications.

In 2009, it was awarded a diamond certification from the Independent Music Companies Association which indicated sales of at least 250,000 copies throughout Europe.

== Background ==
Boulevard is St Germain's debut studio album. It features contributions from Alexandre Destrez (on piano), Pascal Ohsé (on trumpet), Édouard Labor (on saxophone), Malik (on flute), and Miguel "Punta" Rios (on percussion).

== Release ==
Boulevard was released in the United Kingdom on 28 July 1995. In the United States, it was released on 26 March 2002, with a different track listing.

== Critical reception ==
Professional ratings
Review scores
Source	Rating
AllMusic	3.5/5 stars

Andy Hermann of PopMatters stated, "There's little doubt that Boulevard was one of the most influential house music releases of the 1990s -- but influential does not always mean great, and St. Germain's debut, while still a solid effort, doesn't measure up to the brilliance of Tourist."

In 2020, Ben Cardew of DJ Mag described Boulevard as "An album that revolutionized the perception of French music, consummated the union between house and jazz, and spawned a million weakling copies."

== Track listing ==
All tracks are written by Ludovic Navarre.

Boulevard track listing (1995 original edition)
No.	Title	Length
1.	"Deep in It"	7:20
2.	"Thank U Mum (4 Everything You Did)"	12:34
3.	"Street Scene (4 Shazz)" (jazz-hop mix)	10:50
4.	"Easy to Remember"	9:40
5.	"Sentimental Mood"	10:20
6.	"What's New?"	7:45
7.	"Dub Experience II"	3:48
8.	"Forget It"	7:57
Total length:		75:10

Boulevard track listing (2002 U.S. edition)
No.	Title	Length
1.	"Deep in It"	7:20
2.	"Street Scene (4 Shazz)"	15:46
3.	"Sentimental Mood"	10:20
4.	"What's New?"	7:45
5.	"Dub Experience II"	3:48
6.	"Forget It"	7:57
7.	"Soul Salsa Soul"	10:36
8.	"Alabama Blues" (Todd Edwards vocal mix)	5:36
Total length:		68:51

== Personnel ==
Credits adapted from liner notes.

- Ludovic Navarre – production, mixing
- Alexandre Destrez – piano
- Pascal Ohsé – trumpet
- Édouard Labor – saxophone
- Malik – flute
- Miguel "Punta" Rios – percussion
- Geneviève Gauckler – design

== Charts ==
Chart performance for Boulevard
Chart (2001)	Peak position
Belgian Albums (Ultratop Flanders)	33
Belgian Albums (Ultratop Wallonia)	47
Dutch Albums (Album Top 100)	9
French Albums (SNEP)	32
UK Independent Albums (Official Charts)	40

Chart (2026)	Peak position
UK Jazz & Blues Albums (Official Charts)	11

== Certifications ==
Region	Certification	Certified units/sales
Netherlands (NVPI)	Gold	50,000^{^}
United Kingdom (BPI)	Silver	60,000^{^}
^{^} Shipments figures based on certification alone.
