= Memento =

A memento is a keepsake or souvenir of remembrance.

Memento may also refer to:

== Film and television ==
- Memento (film), a 2000 film directed by Christopher Nolan
- "Memento" (Stargate SG-1), an episode of Stargate SG-1

== Music ==
- Memento (band), a musical group
- Memento (Booka Shade album)
- Memento (Dead Can Dance album)
- Memento (Soel album)
- "Memento" (single), by Közi
- "Memento", a song by MUNA from their 2019 album Saves the World
- Memento Materia, a record label
- Memento (Böhse Onkelz album)

== Other ==
- Memento (novel), by Radek John
- Memento Park, an open-air museum in Budapest
- Memento pattern, a software design pattern
- Memento Project, a web archiving project
- Memento (society), Estonian society of persons who fought or suffered for the Estonian independence during the Soviet era

== See also ==
- Memento mori (disambiguation)
- Momento (disambiguation)
