= Soel =

Soel may refer to:

- Pascal Ohsé, stage name Soel, French jazz trumpeter
- Mokona Modoki, also named Soel, a fictional character in the manga series xxxHolic and Tsubasa: Reservoir Chronicle
- School of Excellence in Law (SOEL), a Tamil Nadu Dr. Ambedkar Law University school
- Sōel, a Proto-Germanic name for the Norse solar goddess Sól
