= ASMM =

ASMM may refer to:

- African States, Madagascar and Mauritius; see Yaoundé Convention
- American School of Modern Music, a music school in Paris, France
