= Lady (Hear Me Tonight) =

2000 single by Modjo

Single by Modjo

from the album Modjo
- B-side: "Roller Coaster"
- Released: 19 June 2000
- Genre: French house; disco
- Length: 5:15 (album version); 3:45 (radio edit)
- Label: Sound of Barclay
- Songwriters: Romain Tranchart; Yann Destagnol; Bernard Edwards; Nile Rodgers
- Producers: Romain Tranchart; Yann Destagnol

Modjo singles chronology
"Lady (Hear Me Tonight)" (2000)	"Chillin'" (2001)

Music video
- "Lady (Hear Me Tonight)" on YouTube

"Lady (Hear Me Tonight)" is a song by the French house duo Modjo. It was released on 19 June 2000 as the lead single from their only album, Modjo (2001). The song contains a sample of Chic's "Soup for One" (1982), so Bernard Edwards and Nile Rodgers were given songwriting credits.

"Lady (Hear Me Tonight)" became a major worldwide success, topping at least 10 music charts, including the national charts of Ireland, Italy, Spain, Switzerland, and the UK. It also topped the US Billboard Dance Club Play chart in January 2001. In 2025, Billboard named it one of the greatest dance songs.

== Background ==
Romain Tranchart and Yann Destagnol, the members of Modjo, were attendees of the American School of Modern Music in Paris, France when they signed a record deal with UMG. Until signing the deal, they had not agreed on their band name, and "Lady" was only the "third or fourth" song they had written.

== Content ==
"Lady (Hear Me Tonight)" is written in the key of B-flat minor and proceeds at a moderately fast tempo of 128 beats per minute, in common time. It features a guitar sample of the 1982 single "Soup for One" performed by Chic, as written by Nile Rodgers and Bernard Edwards. Since 2009, Chic has added the song to their concert setlist, which is often performed as a mash-up song with "Soup for One".

The single includes the original version of the track, plus an acoustic version, both performed by Modjo. Remixes have been provided by Harry Romero, Roy Davis Jr. and Danny Tenaglia.

== Release ==
The song debuted at number one in the United Kingdom on 10 September 2000, where it stayed for two weeks to become the sixteenth-best-selling single of 2000. The song earned Modjo an entry in the Guinness Book of World Records as the first French group to debut at number one on the UK singles chart. It also reached number one in seven other European countries and became a top-10 hit in several others, including Australia, Canada and New Zealand. In the United States, the song peaked at number 81 on the Billboard Hot 100 and number one on the Dance Club Play chart. As of 2017, the single has sold two million copies worldwide.

== Critical reception and legacy ==
Upon release, Scottish Daily Record named "Lady (Hear Me Tonight)" a "brilliant" house track. Billboard called it “one of the summer anthems throughout Europe”, and describing the track as “awash in retro memories and of-the-moment dancefloor sensibilities.” The magazine commended its “male vocals, incessant rhythm guitars, filtered effects, and unshakable melodies” for creating “an incredible feel-good atmosphere.”

In 2012, Australian music channel Max ranked the song the 790th-greatest song. In 2018, Mixmag included it in their list of "The 30 Best Vocal House Anthems Ever". In 2019, Insider featured the song in their list of the "102 Songs Everyone Should Listen to in Their Lifetime". In 2025, Billboard ranked the 22nd-best dance song, writing, "When you build your song on a Chic sample, it's guaranteed to be gold, but the pure disco perfection of French band Modjo's 'Lady (Hear Me Tonight)' is somehow even more emotionally powerful than the Nile Rogers original. This French Touch love song is tinged with the genre's signature sense of bittersweet melody, giving it a nostalgic sort of sepia tone that plucks on the heartstrings, even if it's your first time hearing it. Released in the summer of 2000, it has become a classic of the time period with a walking bassline that begs you to dance across the room, look your crush in the eye and declare your love for all to hear." That year, Billboard also ranked it the 15th-best house song.

In 2024, the Norwegian DJ and producer Kygo interpolated the chorus in his single "For Life" featuring British singer Zak Abel and Nile Rodgers, whose 1982 song "Soup for One" with his group Chic was sampled in "Lady (Hear Me Tonight)".

== Music video ==
The accompanying music video for "Lady (Hear Me Tonight)" was directed by François Nemeta and was filmed in June 2000 in various locations in Quebec.

The video starts off with a teenager that looks emotionally down. Taking off with some money, he walks to a restaurant to meet with his friends, a teenage couple. After confessing his frustrations with them, the three pool all their money together, take it to a used car dealership (the two members of Modjo have a cameo in this scene as a car salesman and a mechanic), buy a car and drive it to a country fair. After getting bored, they drive to a bar and watch a band playing. During a break, the teens grab the band's instruments but fail to play them correctly. Annoying the crowd, a person throws a glass bottle to the face of the depressed teenager, before the three are chased out. They then sneak into a motel, where they proceed to shower and sleep together. The next morning, they are ejected by the hotel manager, and drive until their car breaks down. The girl leads the boys into the woods, and they come across a cliff with a view of a city, which they gaze at in awe as the sun sets.

== Track listings ==
- European CD single
1. "Lady (Hear Me Tonight)" (radio edit) – 3:46
2. "Lady (Hear Me Tonight)" – 5:05
- European 12-inch vinyl

A1. "Lady (Hear Me Tonight)" – 5:05
A2. "Lady (Hear Me Tonight)" (radio edit) – 3:46
B1. "Lady" (Roy's Universal Soldiers mix) – 5:10
B2. "Lady" (acoustic) – 3:13

- UK CD single
1. "Lady (Hear Me Tonight)" (radio edit) – 3:46
2. "Lady (Hear Me Tonight)" (original mix) – 5:05
3. "Lady (Hear Me Tonight)" (Acoustique mix) – 3:13
4. "Lady (Hear Me Tonight)" (Roy's Universal Soldiers mix) – 5:10
5. "Lady (Hear Me Tonight)" (CD-Rom video)
- UK cassette single

A1. "Lady (Hear Me Tonight)" (radio edit) – 3:46
A2. "Lady (Hear Me Tonight)" (original mix) – 5:05
B1. "Lady (Hear Me Tonight)" (remix) – 7:07

- Australasian CD single
1. "Lady (Hear Me Tonight)" (radio edit) – 3:46
2. "Lady (Hear Me Tonight)" – 5:05
3. "Roller Coaster" – 6:08
4. "Lady (Hear Me Tonight)" (remix) – 7:07
- US CD single
1. "Lady (Hear Me Tonight)" (original mix)
2. "Lady (Hear Me Tonight)" (Harry "Choo Choo" Romero's Titanium dub)
3. "Lady (Hear Me Tonight)" (Roy's Universal Soldiers mix)
4. "Lady" (acoustic)
5. "Lady (Hear Me Tonight)" (video)
- Japanese CD single
1. "Lady (Hear Me Tonight)" (radio edit) – 3:46
2. "Lady (Hear Me Tonight)" – 5:05
3. "Lady (Hear Me Tonight)" (remix) – 7:07
4. "Lady" (acoustic) – 3:13
5. "Lady" (Roy's Universal Soldiers mix) – 5:10
6. "Lady" (Roy's radio mix) – 3:37

== Charts ==
=== Weekly charts ===
2000–2001 weekly chart performance for "Lady (Hear Me Tonight)"
Chart (2000–2001)	Peak position
Australia (ARIA)	10
Australian Dance (ARIA)	5
Austria (Ö3 Austria Top 40)	8
Belgium (Ultratop 50 Flanders)	5
Belgium (Ultratop 50 Wallonia)	7
Belgium Dance (Ultratop Flanders)	2
Canada (Nielsen SoundScan)	2
Denmark (Tracklisten)	3
Europe (Eurochart Hot 100)	1
Europe Airplay (Music & Media)	3
Europe Border Breakers (Music & Media)	1
European Dance Traxx (Music & Media)	1
Finland (Suomen virallinen lista)	3
France (SNEP)	7
Germany (GfK)	2
Greece (IFPI)	1
Hungary (Mahasz)	1
Iceland (Íslenski Listinn Topp 40)	3
Ireland (IRMA)	1
Ireland Dance (IRMA)	1
Italy (FIMI)	2
Netherlands (Dutch Top 40)	3
Netherlands (Single Top 100)	4
New Zealand (Recorded Music NZ)	5
Norway (VG-lista)	3
Poland Airplay (PiF PaF)	4
Portugal (AFP)	1
Romania (Romanian Top 100)	1
Scottish Singles Sales (Official Charts)	1
Spain (Promusicae)	1
Sweden (Sverigetopplistan)	8
Switzerland (Schweizer Hitparade)	1
UK Singles (Official Charts)	1
UK Dance (Official Charts)	1
US Billboard Hot 100	81
US Dance Club Songs (Billboard)	1
US Dance Singles Sales (Billboard)	2
US Rhythmic Airplay (Billboard)	27

2015–2026 weekly chart performance for "Lady (Hear Me Tonight)"
Chart (2015–2026)	Peak position
CIS Airplay (TopHit)	117
Germany Airplay (BVMI)	15
Kazakhstan Airplay (TopHit)	30
Moldova Airplay (TopHit)	37
Poland Airplay (ZPAV)	62
Russia Airplay (TopHit)	88
Turkey International Airplay (Radiomonitor Türkiye)	10
Ukraine Airplay (TopHit)	111
UK Indie (Official Charts)	47

=== Monthly charts ===
2024 monthly chart performance for "Lady (Hear Me Tonight)"
Chart (2024)	Peak position
Kazakhstan Airplay (TopHit)	45

=== Year-end charts ===
2000 year-end chart performance for "Lady (Hear Me Tonight)"
Chart (2000)	Position
Australia (ARIA)	60
Belgium (Ultratop 50 Flanders)	55
Belgium (Ultratop 50 Wallonia)	24
Brazil (Crowley)	71
Denmark (IFPI)	25
Europe (Eurochart Hot 100)	13
European Radio Top 50 (Music & Media)	17
Europe Border Breakers (Music & Media)	2
France (SNEP)	21
Germany (Media Control)	52
Iceland (Íslenski Listinn Topp 40)	37
Ireland (IRMA)	27
Netherlands (Dutch Top 40)	21
Netherlands (Single Top 100)	36
Romania (Romanian Top 100)	8
Spain (AFYVE)	8
Sweden (Hitlistan)	61
Switzerland (Schweizer Hitparade)	6
UK Singles (OCC)	16

2001 year-end chart performance for "Lady (Hear Me Tonight)"
Chart (2001)	Position
Canada (Nielsen SoundScan)	12
Canada (Nielsen SoundScan) Import	126
Europe (Eurochart Hot 100)	76
Switzerland (Schweizer Hitparade)	74
US Dance Club Play (Billboard)	8
US Maxi-Singles Sales (Billboard)	11

2002 year-end chart performance for "Lady (Hear Me Tonight)"
Chart (2002)	Position
Canada (Nielsen SoundScan)	170

2024 year-end chart performance for "Lady (Hear Me Tonight)"
Chart (2024)	Position
Kazakhstan Airplay (TopHit)	49

2025 year-end chart performance for "Lady (Hear Me Tonight)"
Chart (2025)	Position
CIS Airplay (TopHit)	181

== Certifications ==
Sales and certifications for "Lady (Hear Me Tonight)"
Region	Certification	Certified units/sales
Australia (ARIA)	Gold	35,000^{^}
Belgium (BRMA)	Gold	25,000^{*}
Denmark (IFPI Danmark) Physical	Gold	4,000^{^}
Denmark (IFPI Danmark) Digital	Platinum	90,000^{‡}
France (SNEP)	Gold	250,000^{*}
Germany (BVMI)	Gold	250,000^{^}
Italy (FIMI) sales since 2009	Platinum	100,000^{‡}
New Zealand (RMNZ)	3× Platinum	90,000^{‡}
Spain (Promusicae)	Platinum	60,000^{‡}
Switzerland (IFPI Switzerland)	Platinum	50,000^{^}
United Kingdom (BPI) 2000 release	Platinum	600,000^{‡}
United Kingdom (BPI) 2013 release	Platinum	600,000^{‡}
^{*} Sales figures based on certification alone.^{^} Shipments figures based on certification alone.^{‡} Sales+streaming figures based on certification alone.

== Release history ==
Release dates and formats for "Lady (Hear Me Tonight)"
Region	Date	Format(s)	Label(s)	Ref.
France	19 June 2000	CD	Sound of Barclay	
United Kingdom	4 September 2000	12-inch vinyl; CD; cassette	Sound of Barclay	
Japan	20 December 2000	CD	Barclay; Universal Music Japan	
United States	9 January 2001	Rhythmic contemporary radio	MCA	

== Austin Mahone version ==
"Lady"

Single by Austin Mahone featuring Pitbull

from the EP ForMe+You and the album Dirty Work
- Released: 10 February 2017
- Genre: Dance-pop
- Length: 3:31
- Label: AM Music LLC; Mr. 305 Inc.; BMG
- Songwriters: Yann Destagnol; Romain Tranchart; Bernard Edwards; Nile Rodgers; Austin Mahone; Pitbull
- Producer: Jerome Price

Austin Mahone singles chronology
"Deserve Better" (2016)	"Lady" (2017)	"Creatures of the Night" (2017)

Pitbull singles chronology
"Greenlight" (2016)	"Creatures of the Night" (2017)	"Options" (2017)

"Lady (Hear Me Tonight)" was covered by American singer Austin Mahone featuring rapper Pitbull under the shortened title "Lady". It was released on 10 February 2017, along with its lyrics video.

=== Background ===
The song is a remix of the 2001 "Lady (Hear Me Tonight)" by Modjo. The song features Pitbull, which marks the second collaboration between the two, following 2014's "Mmm Yeah". On New Year's Eve, Mahone performed "Lady" on Pitbull's New Year's Revolution. The song peaked at number one on the Billboard Dance Club Songs. This earned Mahone's first number-one single in the US.

=== Track listings ===
The Remixes
No.	Title	Length
1.	"Lady (feat. Pitbull) (DJ Primetyme Remix)"	5:14
2.	"Lady (feat. Pitbull) (Richard Vission Remix)"	5:21
3.	"Lady (feat. Pitbull) (Big Syphe Remix)"	5:02
4.	"Lady (feat. Pitbull) (IAmChino & Jimmy Joker Remix)"	4:24

The UK Remixes
No.	Title	Length
1.	"Lady (feat. Pitbull) (Wideboys Pool Party Extended Mix)"	4:22
2.	"Lady (feat. Pitbull) (Scott Forshaw & Greg Stainer Mix)"	4:13
3.	"Lady (feat. Pitbull) (Luca DeBonaire Remix)"	5:54
4.	"Lady (feat. Pitbull) (Gue?? Who Remix)"	4:40

=== Charts ===
==== Weekly charts ====
Weekly chart performance for "Lady"
Chart (2017)	Peak position
Finland (Suomen virallinen lista)	20
Japan (Dance Hits 20)	15
US Dance Club Songs (Billboard)	1

==== Year-end charts ====
Year-end chart performance for "Lady"
Chart (2017)	Position
US Dance Club Songs (Billboard)	47

== Oliver Heldens version ==
=== Charts ===
==== Weekly charts ====
Weekly chart performance for Oliver Heldens' version
Chart (2026)	Peak position
Estonia Airplay (TopHit)	45
Latvia Airplay (LaIPA)	7

==== Monthly charts ====
Monthly chart performance for Oliver Heldens' version
Chart (2026)	Peak position
Estonia Airplay (TopHit)	78

== See also ==
- List of Romanian Top 100 number ones of the 2000s
