= Modjo (album) =

2001 album by Modjo

Studio album by Modjo
- Released: 18 September 2001
- Recorded: 1999–2000
- Genres: French house; house; dance-pop; nu-disco
- Length: 51:43
- Label: MCA
- Producers: Yann Destagnol; Romain Tranchart

Singles from Modjo
- 1. "Lady (Hear Me Tonight)" Released: 19 June 2000; 2. "Chillin'" Released: 2 April 2001; 3. "What I Mean" Released: 24 September 2001; 4. "No More Tears" Released: 22 January 2002; 5. "On Fire" Released: 2002

Professional ratings
Review scores
Source	Rating
AllMusic	3/5 stars
RTÉ	2/5 stars

Modjo is the only studio album by French house duo Modjo. It was released on 18 September 2001 by MCA Records.

== Track listing ==
All tracks are written by Yann Destagnol and Romain Tranchart; additional writers noted.

No.	Title	Writer(s)	Length
1.	"Acknowledgement"		3:05
2.	"Chillin'"	Bernard Edwards; Nile Rodgers	4:52
3.	"Lady (Hear Me Tonight)"	Edwards; Rodgers	5:06
4.	"Too Good to Be True"		1:28
5.	"Peace of Mind"		3:15
6.	"What I Mean"		4:13
7.	"Music Takes You Back"		4:13
8.	"No More Tears"		6:15
9.	"Rollercoaster"	Marc Cerrone; Alain Wisniak	4:13
10.	"On Fire"	Cerrone	6:36
11.	"Savior Eyes"		5:14
12.	"Lady" (acoustic version)		3:13
Total length:			51:43

Japanese edition bonus tracks
No.	Title	Length
13.	"Lady (Hear Me Tonight)" (Choo Choo's Original Recipe)	7:41
14.	"Chillin'" (live version)	6:16

UK special edition bonus tracks
No.	Title	Length
13.	"Chillin'" (live version)	6:16
14.	"Lady (Hear Me Tonight)" (Choo Choo's Original Recipe)	7:41
15.	"Chillin'" (Derrick Carter's B.H.Q. Revision Mix)	6:58
16.	"Chillin'" (Modjo's Dyrt Mix)	7:48
17.	"What I Mean" (Ian Pooley's Back in the Days Mix)	6:43
18.	"Lady (Hear Me Tonight)" (CD-ROM Video)
19.	"Chillin'" (CD-ROM Video)
20.	"What I Mean" (CD-ROM Video)

=== Samples used ===
- "Chillin'" contains several samples from "Le Freak" by Chic.
- "Lady (Hear Me Tonight)" contains several samples from "Soup for One" by Chic.
- "Music Takes You Back" contains several samples from "Have You Ever Seen the Rain?" by Boney M. (uncredited).
- "Rollercoaster" contains samples from "Give Me Love" by Cerrone.
- "On Fire" contains samples from "Rocket in the Pocket" by Cerrone.

== Personnel ==
Adopted from Modjo liner notes:

- Modjo – writers, production, performers, mastering
- Hervé Bordes – engineer, mixing
- Matthias Leullier – management
- Mandy Parnell – mastering
- Fabrice Destagnol – album cover painting, illustration, photography

== Charts ==
Chart performance for Modjo
Chart (2001)	Peak position
Australian Albums (ARIA)	89
Austrian Albums (Ö3 Austria)	41
Finnish Albums (Suomen virallinen lista)	39
French Albums (SNEP)	21
German Albums (Offizielle Top 100)	30
Swiss Albums (Schweizer Hitparade)	13

== Certifications ==
Region	Certification	Certified units/sales
New Zealand (RMNZ)	Gold	7,500^{‡}
^{‡} Sales+streaming figures based on certification alone.

== Remix album ==
Modjo (Remixes)

Remix album by Modjo
- Released: 1 January 2013
- Length: 188:05
- Label: Modjo Music
- Producer: Various

In 2013, the album was remastered and released on streaming services, alongside a digital remix album titled Modjo (Remixes). This album contains remixes of Modjo tracks from Harry "Choo Choo" Romero (track 5, 6), Roy Davis Jr. (track 7, 8), Armand van Helden (track 25, 26), and others.

Modjo (Remixes) tracklist
No.	Title	Length
1.	"Lady (Hear Me Tonight)" (Danny Tenaglia's Statue Of Liberty Mix)	10:16
2.	"Lady (Hear Me Tonight)" (Modjo's Dyrt Remix)	7:07
3.	"Lady (Hear Me Tonight)" (Erick Morillo vs. Who Da Funk Remix Radio Edit)	4:34
4.	"Lady (Hear Me Tonight)" (Erick Morillo vs. Who Da Funk Remix)	7:19
5.	"Lady (Hear Me Tonight)" (Harry "Choo Choo" Romero's Original Recipe)	7:41
6.	"Lady (Hear Me Tonight)" (Harry "Choo Choo" Romero's Titanium Dub)	8:27
7.	"Lady (Hear Me Tonight)" (Roy's Universal Soldiers Mix)	5:10
8.	"Lady (Hear Me Tonight)" (Roy's Universal Radio Mix)	3:38
9.	"Chillin'" (Derrick Carter's B.H.Q. Revision 1.2)	6:57
10.	"Chillin'" (Modjo's Dyrt Remix)	7:40
11.	"Chillin'" (Hervé Bordes The Art Of Chillin' Mix)	4:03
12.	"Chillin'" (Live)	6:17
13.	"Chillin'" (We In Music Vs The Buffalo Bunch's Chillin' Con Carne Por Favor Mix)	5:54
14.	"What I Mean" (The Crayon Remix by Aloud)	6:18
15.	"What I Mean" (The Crayon Remix Edit by Aloud)	4:06
16.	"What I Mean" (Ian Pooley's Back In The Days Mix)	6:44
17.	"What I Mean" (Ian Pooley's Na Praia Mix)	6:27
18.	"What I Mean" (Mood II Swing Vocal Club Mix)	7:13
19.	"What I Mean" (Mood II Swing Vocal Dub Remix)	6:12
20.	"No More Tears" (Wuz Remix)	8:51
21.	"No More Tears" (Step House Mix by Play Paul)	6:11
22.	"No More Tears" (Highpass vs. Triple X Dub Mix)	6:03
23.	"No More Tears" (Highpass vs. Triple X Radio Edit)	3:34
24.	"No More Tears" (Highpass vs. Triple X Remix)	5:30
25.	"On Fire" (Archigram's "When What" Remix)	7:15
26.	"On Fire" (Armand van Helden Vocal Mix)	8:29
27.	"On Fire" (Armand van Helden Dub Mix)	7:17
28.	"On Fire" (Demon Remix)	7:43
29.	"On Fire" (Modjo's Dyrt Edit)	5:09
Total length:		188:05
