= No More Tears (disambiguation) =

No More Tears is an album by Ozzy Osbourne.

No More Tears may also refer to:

== Music ==
=== Albums ===
- No More Tears (For Lady Day), a 1988 album by Mal Waldron
- No More Tears (EP), by Black Label Society

=== Songs ===
- "No More Tears" (Angela Winbush song)
- "No More Tears" (Anita Baker song)
- "No More Tears" (Jeanette song)
- "No More Tears" (Modjo song)
- "No More Tears" (Ozzy Osbourne song), the title song from the Ozzy Osbourne album
- "No More Tears (Enough Is Enough)", a song by Barbra Streisand and Donna Summer
- "No More Tears", by Andrew Jackson Jihad from the album People That Can Eat People Are the Luckiest People in the World
- "No More Tears", by Little River Band from the album The Net
- "No More Tears", by Namie Amuro from the single "Think of Me" / "No More Tears"

== Other uses ==
- "No More Tears", a trademark for Johnson's baby shampoo

== See also ==
- No More Tears Sister, a 2005 documentary film
- "Enough Is Enough (No More Tears)", an episode of the TV series Grey's Anatomy
