= American School of Modern Music =

Music school in Paris, France

Coordinates: 48.8422°N 2.2940°E

The American School of Modern Music (ASMM) is a music school in the 15th arrondissement of Paris, France, specialising in jazz and contemporary popular music.

== History ==
The school was founded in 1982 by American drummer Stephen Carbonara, an alumnus of Berklee College of Music. In an interview published by Réseau MAP in 2023, the school described its original aim as bringing American approaches to music education to France.

In 1995, Berklee Today announced the school's admission to the Berklee International Network of Contemporary Music Education (BIN). The magazine reported that the school had 150 students enrolled in a four-year programme and eight teachers at that time. The curriculum included harmony, ear training, arranging and instrumental study, with ensembles covering jazz, funk, rock, Latin jazz and reggae.

In a letter published on the school's website on 2 June 2016, Carbonara announced that he would hand over its management to a new team for the 2016–2017 academic year.

The school is a member of the Fédération nationale des écoles d'influence jazz et musiques actuelles (FNEIJMA). It joined Réseau MAP, a network of contemporary music organisations in Paris, in 2023.

== Management ==
Guillaume Estace is the school's director general. In 2018, he was its co-director and a faculty member. Thomas Billon is its administrative and financial director.

== Teaching ==
The school draws on the teaching methods of American universities. It offers a three-year professional programme, courses for amateur musicians, workshops and masterclasses. The professional curriculum includes instrumental or vocal study, harmony, arranging, ear training, composition and computer-based music production.

== Faculty ==
The teaching staff listed by the school includes, among others, the following musicians and producers:

- Piano: Leïla Olivesi, Cédric Hanriot, Alexey Asantcheeff and Florian Berret.
- Voice: Lou Tavano, Aneta George, Raphaële Atlan and Louise Debaecker, who is also a cellist.
- Guitar: Anthony Jambon, Noé Sebban, Guillaume Estace and Thomas Billon.
- Saxophone: Denis Guivarc'h, Alex Terrier and Pascal Mabit.
- Bass and double bass: Louis de Mieulle, Nicolas Bauer and Jean-Philippe Viret.
- Drums: Raphaël Pannier and Hélios Mikhaïl.
- Percussion and ensemble playing: François Constantin.
- Music production and computer-based music: Thony Ritz and Antoine Martin.

== Facilities ==
The school is based at 117 rue de la Croix-Nivert in the 15th arrondissement of Paris. It also holds workshops at Les Frigos, at 19 rue des Frigos in the 13th arrondissement of Paris, the address of the Union des musiciens de jazz (UMJ) studios.

== Diploma and professional certification ==
The school awards its own diploma to students who complete the professional programme.

It is also authorised to provide training and conduct assessments for the Artiste musicien des musiques actuelles (AMMA) professional qualification. Awarded by FNEIJMA, this qualification is registered at level 5 in France's Répertoire national des certifications professionnelles (RNCP), under registration number RNCP42871.

== Masterclasses and guest artists ==
The school organises masterclasses, some open to the public and others reserved for its students. Its listed guest artists include Brad Thomas Ackley, Camille Bertault, Randy Brecker, Édouard Brenneisen, Steve Coleman, Jacob Collier, Stefano Di Battista, Joël Dufeu, Jean-Marie Ecay, Thomas Enhco, Guillaume Estace, Jean-Philippe Fanfant, Jean Gobinet, Nicolas Godefroy, Tansy Greenlee, Michele Hendricks, Ari Hoenig, Kaspar Jalily, Jonathan Kreisberg, Biréli Lagrène, Maciek Lasserre, David Linx, Lionel Loueke, Sylvain Luc, Magic Malik, Raul Midón, Tim Miller, Alba Obert, Logan Richardson, James Robbins, Kurt Rosenwinkel, Chad Smith, Charles Turner, Nelson Veras and Stéphane Wrembel.

The school's event announcements and photographic archives also document masterclasses by Barry Harris, Mike Clark and Reggie Washington, Fred Nardin and Stefano Di Battista, Aaron Parks, Pierre Danel and Manuel Valera. Pianist Michael Weiss lists a masterclass at ASMM in 2009 on his website. The school has also published an excerpt from a masterclass by Lau Noah.

The photographic archives also show meetings with Henrik Linder, alongside Tim Miller, and with Matthieu Chedid.

== Notable alumni ==
- Alexandre Astier, actor, director and composer.
- Lionel Loueke, guitarist.
- Stéphane Wrembel, guitarist and composer.
- Cyrille Aimée, singer.
- Norma Ray, singer.
- Romain Tranchart and Yann Destal, members of the duo Modjo.
- Lou Tavano, singer.
- Anne Paceo, drummer and composer.
- Kalika, singer.
- Sébastien Llado, trombonist.
- Édouard Brenneisen, composer.
- Alexandre Destrez, pianist.

== Further study and scholarships ==
Former students have gone on to study at Berklee College of Music, the Manhattan School of Music, the City College of New York, and Purchase College, State University of New York. The school has also announced admissions with scholarships to The New School in New York.

In France, alumni have studied at the Conservatoire de Paris and the Conservatoire à rayonnement régional de Paris. After Berklee, Lionel Loueke entered the Thelonious Monk Institute of Jazz, which was then based at the University of Southern California.

In February 2022, the school announced that Lilou Chance had received a scholarship covering all tuition fees at Berklee. In January 2024, it announced scholarships of the same kind for Belen Kirsch and Léna Maire.

== Historical faculty ==
In 1995, Shannon Murray was among the teachers mentioned by Berklee Today. Dominic Alldis also taught at the school.

In 2012, the faculty included Rick Margitza, Phil Hilfiker, Christopher Culpo, Peter Giron, Tony Saba and Bernard Vidal.

In 2018–2019, the faculty also included Michele Hendricks, Charles Turner, Nelson Veras, Brad Thomas Ackley and James Robbins.
