= Memento (Soel album) =

Studio album by Soel
- Released: October 6, 2003
- Studio: Magic House Studio (Paris, France)
- Genre: Acid jazz
- Length: 47:55
- Label: Warner Jazz France
- Producer: Ludovic "St Germain" Navarre

Singles from Memento
- 1. "Le Vicomte" Released: 2003

Professional ratings
Review scores
Source	Rating
All About Jazz	3.5/5 stars
AllMusic	3/5 stars
PopMatters	4/10 stars
Voir	3.5/5 stars

Memento is the debut studio album by French trumpeter Soel. It was released in 2003 through Warner Jazz France. Recording sessions took place at Magic House Studio in Paris, France. Production of the album was solely handled by St Germain. It features contribution from Tori Robinson, Clem Ashford and Chris Henry on vocals, Didier Davidas on keyboards, Alex Legrand and Frantz Calcul on guitar, Mike Clinton on bass, Edmundo Carneiro on percussion, Edouard Labor on saxophone and flute, Rachid Mouna on baritone saxophone, and Edivandro Borges on trombone.

The album peaked at number 63 in Belgium, at number 107 in France, and at number 16 on the UK Jazz & Blues Albums.

== Track listing ==
No.	Title	Length
1.	"Le Vicomte"	5:23
2.	"Shining Pain"	4:11
3.	"My Singing Soul"	6:59
4.	"Prelude"	1:53
5.	"Black Women"	5:02
6.	"The Earth Mother"	5:35
7.	"To This World"	6:06
8.	"The Way U R"	4:56
9.	"We Have Died Already"	7:46
Total length:		47:55

Sample credits

- Track 1 contains elements from "Chitterlings Con Carne" by Pucho & The Latin Soul Brothers
- Track 3 contains elements from "Joy" by Isaac Hayes
- Track 4 contains elements from "Jericho Jerk" by Michel Colombier and Pierre Henry
- Track 5 contains elements from "Black Woman" by The Last Poets, "Runnin'" by Edwin Starr, "Jericho Jerk" by Michel Colombier and Pierre Henry
- Track 9 contains elements from "Been Done Already" by The Last Poets

== Personnel ==
- Pascal Ohsé – main artist, trumpet
- Victoria "Tori" Robinson – vocals
- Clement "Clem" Ashford – vocals
- Chris Henry – vocals
- Didier Davidas – keyboards
- Frantz Calcul – guitar
- Alex Legrand – guitar
- Mike Clinton – bass
- Edmundo Carneiro – percussion
- Edouard Labor – saxophone, flute
- Rachid Mouna – baritone saxophone
- Edivandro Borges – trombone
- Ludovic Navarre – producer, mixing, presenter
- Pompon Finkelstein – mastering

== Chart history ==
Chart (2003)	Peak position
Belgian Albums (Ultratop Flanders)	63
French Albums (SNEP)	107
UK Jazz & Blues Albums (OCC)	16
