= Tourist (St Germain album) =

Studio album by St Germain
- Released: 30 May 2000
- Studio: The Magic House Studio
- Genres: Nu jazz; acid jazz
- Length: 59:52
- Label: Blue Note
- Producer: Ludovic Navarre

St Germain chronology
From Detroit to St Germain (1999)	Tourist (2000)	St Germain (2015)

Tourist is the third studio album by French producer Ludovic Navarre, released under his stage name St Germain. The album's musical style features a combination of nu jazz and acid jazz, what AllMusic described as "a synthesis of electronics with jazz soloing".

Tourist formed the soundtrack of the 2001 French film Chaos.

== Samples ==
- "Rose Rouge"
  - Marlena Shaw, excerpts from "Woman of the Ghetto" from Live at Montreux
  - Dave Brubeck, excerpts from "Take Five" as the drum and bass loop
- "Sure Thing"
  - Miles Davis & John Lee Hooker, excerpts from "Harry's Philosophy" from The Hot Spot Soundtrack album.

== Legacy ==
Professional ratings
Review scores
Source	Rating
AllMusic	4.5/5 stars
The Austin Chronicle	4/5 stars
Muzik	5/5 stars
PopMatters	8/10
Rolling Stone	4/5 stars
Stereo & Video	2/5 stars

As of 2018, Tourist has sold over four million copies worldwide.

== Track listing ==
All tracks are written by Ludovic Navarre except where noted.

Tourist track listing
No.	Title	Writer(s)	Length
1.	"Rose Rouge"	Navarre; Marlena Shaw; Dave Brubeck	7:02
2.	"Montego Bay Spleen"	Navarre; Hopeton Overton Brown	5:44
3.	"So Flute"	Navarre; Roland Kirk	8:31
4.	"Land Of..."		7:52
5.	"Latin Note"		5:59
6.	"Sure Thing"	Navarre; Miles Davis; John Lee Hooker; 100% Pure Poison	6:22
7.	"Pont des Arts"		7:27
8.	"La Goutte d'Or"		6:18
9.	"What You Think About..."		4:47
Total length:			59:52

== Personnel ==
- Ludovic Navarre – producer
- Pascal Ohsé – trumpet
- Claudio de Queiroz – baritone saxophone
- Edouard Labor – saxophones, flute
- Alexandre Destrez – keyboards
- Ernest Ranglin – guitar (on "Montego Bay Spleen")
- Idrissa Diop – talking drum
- Edmundo Carneiro – percussion

== Charts ==
=== Weekly charts ===
Chart (2000–2001)	Peak position
Australian Albums (ARIA)	23
Austrian Albums (Ö3 Austria)	23
Belgian Albums (Ultratop Flanders)	3
Belgian Albums (Ultratop Wallonia)	6
Canada Top Albums/CDs (RPM)	28
Dutch Albums (Album Top 100)	3
Finnish Albums (Suomen virallinen lista)	27
French Albums (SNEP)	5
German Albums (Offizielle Top 100)	76
Irish Albums (IRMA)	29
Italian Albums (FIMI)	8
New Zealand Albums (RMNZ)	8
Norwegian Albums (VG-lista)	9
Portuguese Albums (AFP)	48
Scottish Albums (Official Charts)	73
Swedish Albums (Sverigetopplistan)	59
Swiss Albums (Schweizer Hitparade)	37
UK Albums (Official Charts)	73
US Heatseekers Albums (Billboard)	27
US Top Jazz Albums (Billboard)	1

=== Year-end charts ===
Chart (2000)	Position
Belgian Albums (Ultratop Flanders)	15
Belgian Albums (Ultratop Wallonia)	27
Canadian Albums (Nielsen SoundScan)	146
Dutch Albums (Album Top 100)	39
French Albums (SNEP)	28
New Zealand Albums (RMNZ)	20

Chart (2001)	Position
Australian Albums (ARIA)	68
Belgian Albums (Ultratop Flanders)	15
Belgian Albums (Ultratop Wallonia)	35
Canadian Albums (Nielsen SoundScan)	98
Canadian Jazz Albums (Nielsen SoundScan)	2
Dutch Albums (Album Top 100)	13
French Albums (SNEP)	28
New Zealand Albums (RMNZ)	11

Chart (2002)	Position
Belgian Albums (Ultratop Flanders)	41
Canadian Jazz Albums (Nielsen SoundScan)	6
Dutch Albums (Album Top 100)	63
French Albums (SNEP)	63

Chart (2003)	Position
Belgian Albums (Ultratop Flanders)	56

== Certifications and sales ==
Region	Certification	Certified units/sales
Australia (ARIA)	Platinum	70,000^{^}
Belgium (BRMA)	2× Platinum	100,000^{*}
Canada (Music Canada)	Platinum	100,000^{^}
France (SNEP)	3× Platinum	600,000^{*}
Ireland (IRMA)	Gold	7,500^{^}
Italy (FIMI)	Gold	50,000^{*}
Netherlands (NVPI)	Platinum	80,000^{^}
New Zealand (RMNZ)	3× Platinum	45,000^{^}
Spain (Promusicae)	Gold	50,000^{^}
Switzerland (IFPI Switzerland)	Gold	25,000^{^}
United Kingdom (BPI)	Gold	100,000^{^}
United States	—	300,000
Summaries
Europe (IFPI)	Platinum	1,000,000^{*}
Worldwide	—	4,000,000
^{*} Sales figures based on certification alone.^{^} Shipments figures based on certification alone.
