= St Germain (album) =

Studio album by St Germain
- Released: 9 October 2015
- Recorded: 2015
- Genre: Nu jazz, Afro house
- Length: 50:58
- Label: Warner Music, Parlophone, Nonesuch Records
- Producer: St Germain

St Germain chronology
Tourist (2000)	St Germain (2015)

Singles from St. Germain
- 1. "Real Blues" Released: 4 May 2015; 2. "Sittin' Here" Released: 2 October 2015

St Germain is the fourth studio album by French house producer Ludovic Navarre, under his main pseudonym St Germain. It was released on 9 October 2015 via Primary Society. Two official singles had been released from the album: "Real Blues" which features the vocals of Lightnin' Hopkins and "Sittin' Here" (vocals in Bambara language by Malian singer Nahawa Doumbia stem from her song Koro Dia).

== Reception ==
Professional ratings
Aggregate scores
Source	Rating
Metacritic	73/100
Review scores
Source	Rating
AllMusic	3.5/5 stars
Clash	8/10
The Guardian	3/5 stars
Pitchfork Media	6/10

St Germain received positive reviews from critics upon release. On Metacritic, the album holds a score of 73/100 based on 8 reviews, indicating generally favorable reviews.

== Track listing ==
No.	Title	Length
1.	"Real Blues"	5:16
2.	"Sittin' Here"	6:23
3.	"Hanky-Panky"	7:06
4.	"Voilà"	6:30
5.	"Family Tree"	7:54
6.	"How Dare You"	6:43
7.	"Mary L."	5:23
8.	"Forget Me Not"	5:44
Total length:		50:58

== Charts ==
=== Weekly charts ===
Chart (2015)	Peak position
Australian Albums (ARIA)	67
Austrian Albums (Ö3 Austria)	43
Belgian Albums (Ultratop Flanders)	2
Belgian Albums (Ultratop Wallonia)	6
Dutch Albums (Album Top 100)	11
French Albums (SNEP)	15
Irish Albums (IRMA)	59
Italian Albums (FIMI)	29
New Zealand Albums (RMNZ)	19
Portuguese Albums (AFP)	17
Swiss Albums (Schweizer Hitparade)	22
UK Albums (OCC)	76
US Top Dance Albums (Billboard)	6
US Top Heatseekers Albums (Billboard)	5
US Top Jazz Albums (Billboard)	2

=== Year-end charts ===
Chart (2015)	Position
Belgian Albums (Ultratop Flanders)	95
Belgian Albums (Ultratop Wallonia)	195
