= Pascal Ohsé =

- Also known as: Soel
- Origin: Paris, France
- Genres: Jazz
- Occupation: Trumpeter
- Years active: 1992–2005
- Label: Warner Bros. Records

Pascal Ohsé, also known by his stage name Soel, is a French jazz trumpeter. He is well known for his contributions to St Germain albums Boulevard and Tourist. In 2003 he released his studio album titled Memento, which peaked at #63 in Belgium, at #107 in France, and at #16 on the UK Jazz & Blues Albums.

== Discography ==
Studio albums

- Memento (2003)

Singles

- "Le Vicomte" (2003)

Contributions

- 1995 – Boulevard
- 1999 – From Detroit to St Germain (on "Soul Salsa Soul")
- 2000 – Tourist
