= We In Music =

French music group

- Origin: Paris, France
- Genres: French house, House
- Years active: 2000 - 2001
- Labels: We Rock Music, Virgin France
- Members: Raw Man; Play Paul; Benjamin Diamond; Curtis

We In Music is a French music group. It is the project of french house artist Raw Man (Romain Séo), who collaborated on releases together primarily with Play Paul (Paul De Homem-Christo), but also Benjamin Diamond (of Stardust) and Curtis (Fabien Lefrançois).

Séo and Homem-Christo also comprise the group Buffalo Bunch, who have also remixed/coordinated with some We In Music tracks.

The group have released tracks primarily under the We Rock Music label (founded in 2000 by Raw Man), with some tracks being licensed to Virgin France.

They have also released tracks under the name For The Floorz.

== Discography ==
=== Singles ===
- 2000: Now That Love Has Gone
- 2001: Grandlife (samples Klymaxx's I Wish You Would)

=== Remixes ===
- Bebel Gilberto - Close Your Eyes (We In Music/Buffalo Bunch Remix)
- Modjo - Chillin' (Chillin' Con Carne Por Favor Mix by We In Music vs. The Buffalo Bunch)
