= Chillin' (Modjo song) =

2001 single by Modjo

Single by Modjo

from the album Modjo
- B-side: "Chillin' Con Carne"; "The Art of Chillin'"
- Released: 2 April 2001
- Length: 3:48
- Label: Sound of Barclay
- Songwriters: Romain Tranchart; Yann Destagnol; Nile Rodgers; Bernard Edwards
- Producers: Romain Tranchart; Yann Destagnol

Modjo singles chronology
| "Lady (Hear Me Tonight)" (2000) | "Chillin'" (2001) | "What I Mean" (2001) |

"Chillin'" is a song by French house duo Modjo, written and performed by producer Romain Tranchart and vocalist Yann Destagnol. It was released as the second single from their debut studio album, Modjo (2001). The song features samples from "Le Freak" by Chic, for which Nile Rodgers and Bernard Edwards are also credited as songwriters. Released on 2 April 2001, the song reached number three in Finland and Hungary, number four in Portugal and Spain, number 10 in Switzerland, and number 12 in the United Kingdom.

== Track listings ==
- French CD single
1. "Chillin'" (radio edit) – 3:48
2. "Chillin'" (original extended) – 5:07
- UK CD single
1. "Chillin'" (original extended) – 5:07
2. "Chillin' Con Carne" (Por Favor mix by We in Music vs. the Buffalo Bunch) – 5:52
3. "Lady (Hear Me Tonight)" (Choo Choo's original recipe) – 7:41
4. "Chillin'" (video)
- UK 12-inch single

A1. "Chillin'" (original extended) – 5:07
A2. "Chillin' Con Carne" (Por Favor mix by We in Music vs. the Buffalo Bunch) – 5:52
B1. "The Art of Chillin'" (by Hervé Bordes) – 4:03

- UK cassette single

A1. "Chillin'" (radio edit) – 3:48
A2. "Chillin'" (original extended) – 5:07
B1. "Lady (Hear Me Tonight)" (Choo Choo's original recipe) – 7:41

- Australian CD single
1. "Chillin'" (radio edit) – 3:48
2. "Chillin'" (original extended) – 5:07
3. "Chillin' Con Carne" (Por Favor mix by We in Music vs. the Buffalo Bunch) – 5:52
4. "The Art of Chillin'" (by Hervé Bordes) – 4:03
5. "Lady (Hear Me Tonight)" (acoustic) – 3:13
- US maxi-CD single
1. "Chillin'" (original extended) – 5:07
2. "Chillin' Con Carne" (Por Favor mix by We in Music vs. the Buffalo Bunch) – 5:53
3. "Chillin'" (Modjo Dyrt remix) – 7:39
4. "Chillin'" (live) – 6:16
5. "Chillin'" (music video) – 3:48
- US 12-inch single

A1. "Chillin'" (original extended) – 5:07
A2. "The Art of Chillin'" (by Hervé Bordes) – 4:03
B1. "Chillin' Con Carne" (Por Favor mix by We in Music vs. the Buffalo Bunch) – 5:53
B2. "Chillin'" (original mix) – 3:48

== Charts ==
=== Weekly charts ===
Weekly chart performance for "Chillin'"
| Chart (2000–2001) | Peak position |
|---|---|
| Australia (ARIA) | 35 |
| Austria (Ö3 Austria Top 40) | 56 |
| Belgium (Ultratop 50 Flanders) | 34 |
| Belgium (Ultratop 50 Wallonia) | 34 |
| Denmark (Tracklisten) | 19 |
| Europe (Eurochart Hot 100) | 16 |
| Finland (Suomen virallinen lista) | 3 |
| France (SNEP) | 44 |
| Germany (GfK) | 38 |
| Hungary (Mahasz) | 3 |
| Ireland (IRMA) | 14 |
| Ireland Dance (IRMA) | 1 |
| Italy (FIMI) | 24 |
| Netherlands (Dutch Top 40) | 19 |
| Netherlands (Single Top 100) | 41 |
| Portugal (AFP) | 4 |
| Scotland Singles (OCC) | 15 |
| Spain (Promusicae) | 4 |
| Sweden (Sverigetopplistan) | 26 |
| Switzerland (Schweizer Hitparade) | 10 |
| UK Singles (OCC) | 12 |
| UK Dance (OCC) | 2 |
| US Dance Singles Sales (Billboard) | 23 |

=== Year-end charts ===
Year-end chart performance for "Chillin'"
| Chart (2001) | Position |
|---|---|
| Switzerland (Schweizer Hitparade) | 93 |

== Release history ==
Release dates and formats for "Chillin'"
| Region | Date | Format(s) | Label(s) | Ref. |
|---|---|---|---|---|
| Australia | 2 April 2001 | CD | Sound of Barclay | |
| United Kingdom | 2 April 2001 | 12-inch vinyl; CD; cassette | Sound of Barclay | |
| Japan | 21 April 2001 | CD | Sound of Barclay | |
