= Cédric Hanriot =

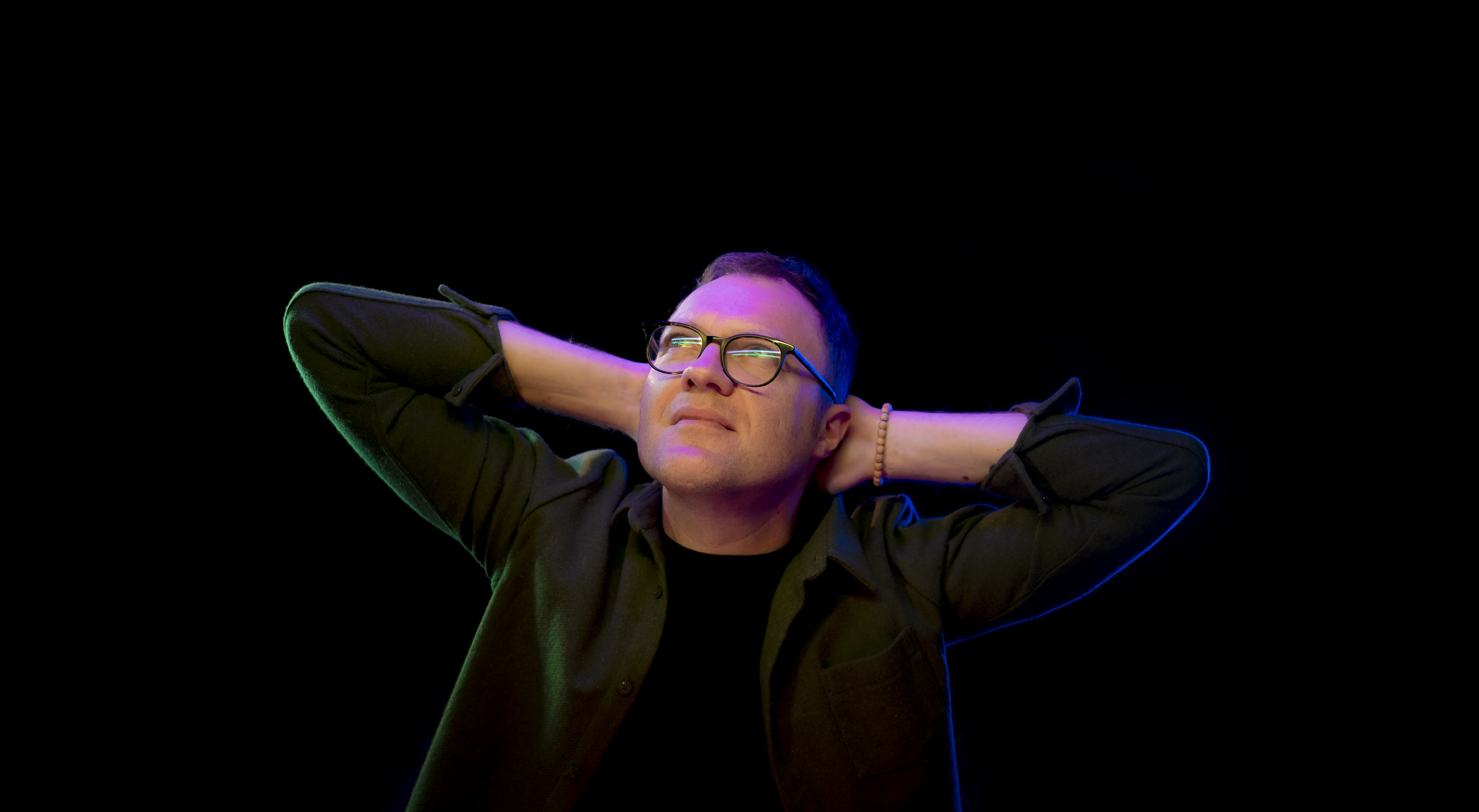
- Cédric Hanriot on 2021

Background information
- Genres: Jazz
- Occupations: Pianist, composer, arranger, record producer
- Instrument: Piano
- Years active: 1998–present
- Website: cedrichanriot.com

Cédric Hanriot (French: [sedʁik ɑ̃ʁjo]) is a French jazz pianist, composer, arranger and record producer. He is a member of American School of Modern Music.

Hanriot has worked on 8 of 12 songs on the album Beautiful Life, which received Grammy Award for Best Jazz Vocal Album in 2015. He has performed at Jazz à Vienne, Opéra Nouvel, Tanglewood Jazz Festival, Jarasum International Jazz Festival, and La Défense Jazz Festival.

Hanriot has collaborated with musicians such as Dianne Reeves, Herbie Hancock, Terri Lyne Carrington, John Patitucci, Donny McCaslin, John Beasley, Meshell Ndegeocello, Metropole Orkest, Melissa Aldana, Tineke Postma, Braxton Cook, Florin Niculescu, Luis Salinas, Wayne Escoffery, Michael Janisch and Jeff Ballard.

== Discography ==
- Electrify My Soul (Cristal, 2006)
- French Stories (Plus Loin, 2010)
- Day (Morphosis, 2018)
- Time is Color (Morphosis, 2022)

=== As a sideman ===
With Terri Lyne Carrington:

- The Mosaic Project, Love and Soul (2015)
- More to Say (Real Life Story: Next Gen) (2009)

With Dianne Reeves

- Beautiful Life (2014)
