= What I Mean =

Single by Modjo

from the album Modjo
- Released: 24 September 2001
- Genre: R&B
- Length: 4:10
- Label: Universal; Polydor
- Songwriter(s): Romain Tranchart; Yann Destagnol
- Producer(s): Romain Tranchart

Modjo singles chronology
"Chillin'" (2001)	"What I Mean" (2001)	"No More Tears" (2002)

"What I Mean" is a song by French house duo Modjo. It was released in September 2001 as the third single from their only self-titled album (2001). There are two versions, the original mix and another more dance-oriented.

== Track listing ==
- CD single – Europe (2001)
1. "What I Mean" (Original album mix)
2. "What I Mean" (Aloud mix)

== Charts ==
Chart (2001–02)	Peak position
Austria (Ö3 Austria Top 40)	64
France (SNEP)	88
Germany (GfK)	67
Italy (FIMI)	50
Poland (Polish Airplay Chart)	4
Scotland (OCC)	66
Spain (PROMUSICAE)	7
Switzerland (Schweizer Hitparade)	17
UK Singles (OCC)	59
