= Soup for One =

Soup for One may refer to:

- Soup for One (film), a 1982 sexually themed romantic comedy
  - Soup for One (soundtrack), the soundtrack album of the 1982 film of the same name
  - Soup for One (song), a song by the band Chic, from the 1982 film of the same name
