= From Detroit to St Germain =

Studio album by St Germain
- Released: June 1999
- Recorded: 1992–1996
- Genre: House; lounge; acid jazz; nu jazz; dub; deep house
- Length: 75:00
- Label: F Communications
- Producer: Ludovic Navarre

St Germain chronology
Boulevard (1995)	From Detroit to St Germain (1999)	Tourist (2001)

From Detroit to St Germain is a compilation of songs composed by electronic musician Ludovic Navarre, better known as St Germain. The 2CD-edition, re-issued digitally in 2012 under the subtitle "The Complete Series for Connoisseurs", has a different track listing.

In 2009, the album was awarded a silver certification from the Independent Music Companies Association, indicating sales of at least 30,000 copies throughout Europe.

== Track listing ==
All tracks are written by Ludovic Navarre, under various pseudonyms.

No.	Title	Writer(s)	Length
1.	"The Black Man"	St Germain	5:30
2.	"Alabama Blues" (Todd Edwards Vocal Mix)	St Germain	5:35
3.	"Walk So Lonely"	Ludovic Navarre	4:37
4.	"Jack on the Groove"	D.S.	4:40
5.	"Prélusion"	Deepside	7:12
6.	"French"	Deepside	5:45
7.	"How Do You Plead?"	Soofle	6:41
8.	"Move"	Nuages	6:50
9.	"Deep in It"	St Germain	7:18
10.	"Soul Salsa Soul"	Ludovic Navarre	10:14
11.	"My Mama Said..."	Ludovic Navarre	5:21
12.	"Dub Experience"	St Germain	5:17
