= Shazz =

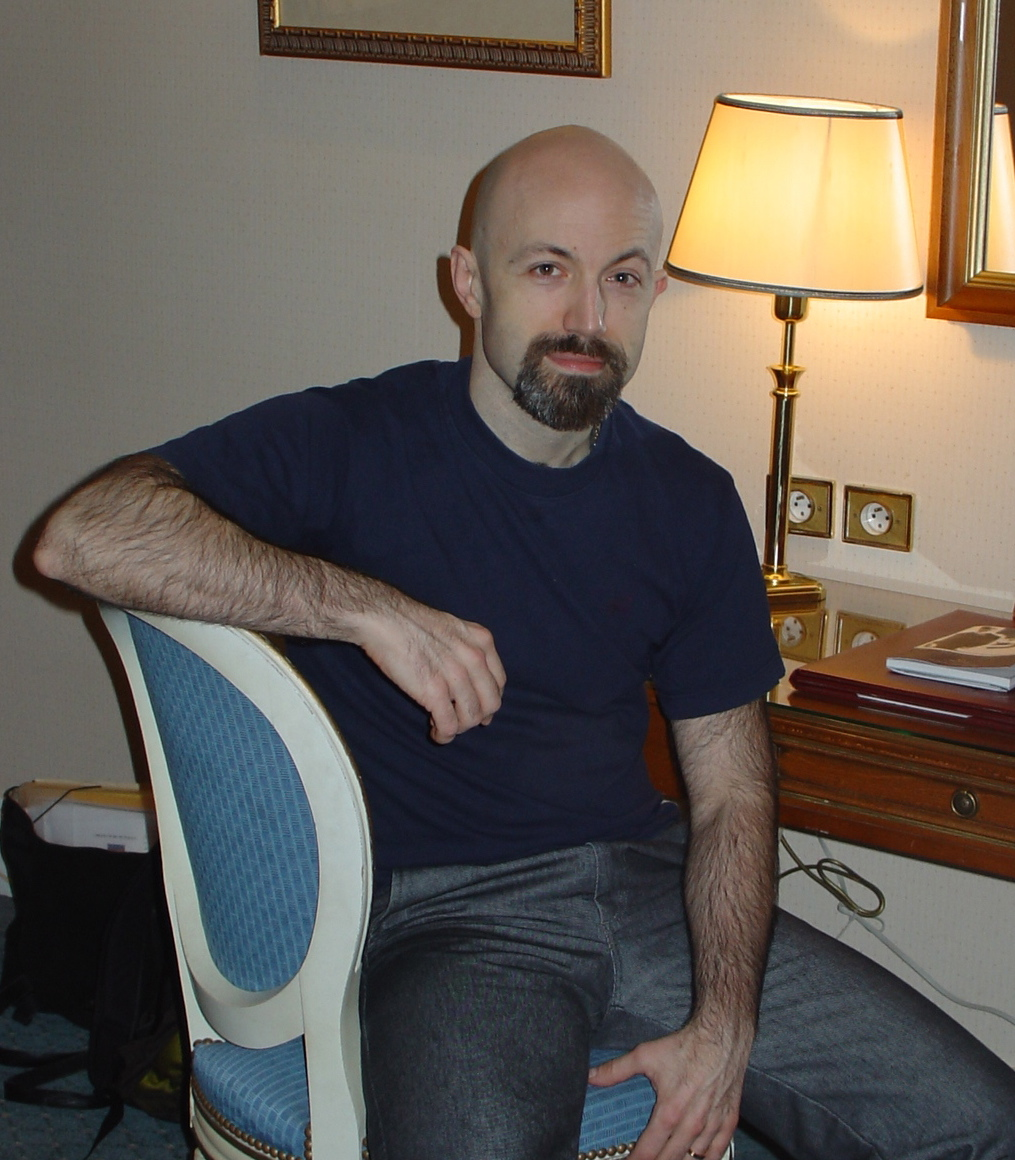

Background information
- Also known as: Shazz
- Born: Didier Delesalle; 1967 (age 57–58); Dunkirk, France
- Genres: French House; Electro house Hip house
- Occupation(s): record producer remixer
- Labels: Columbia Records; Epic Records; F Communications; Fragile Records; Naïve Records; Pschent Music; Sony Music Entertainment; Yellow Productions
- Website: www.shazzmusic.com

Shazz (born Didier Delesalle; 1967), is a French record producer and remixer.

Shazz is the alias for Soul house and Jazz.

Shazz is one of the first artists signed to the label Fnac Music Dance Division. He collaborated with Ludovic Navarre (Saint Germain) under the name L'n'S, and with Laurent Garnier under the name "Choice"

Shazz has also produced music in this musical genre and has been releasing records for French musical labels since 1992. His El Camino part 1 was used in the 1998 film Homeboys at the Beach.

In the late 1990s, Shazz signed with a major label Columbia Records. With his second album In The Light (Epic Records), composed in the space of one year, Shazz combined house, pop and African-American music. His third album Beautiful was more song-based.

== Albums ==
- 1998 - Shazz (Columbia/ en 2000 sur Distance records)
- 2001 - In The Light (Epic Records)
- 2002 - In The Night (Album de remixes, Epic Records)
- 2004 - Beautiful (ULM)
- 2005 - Human? (Naïve Records)
- 2009 - Heritage with Michael Robinson (Wagram)

== Maxis ==
- 1992 - Moonflower (12" / CD, Maxi) Fnac Music Dance Division
- 1992 - Shazz EP (12" / CD, Maxi) Fnac Music Dance Division
- 1993 - Lost Illusions (12" / CD, Maxi) Fnac Music Dance Division
- 1994 - A View Of Manhattan (CD, Maxi / 12", EP) F Communications
- 1996 - Back In Manhattan (CD, Single)F Communications
- 1996 - Muse Q The Music (CD, Maxi) F Communications
- 1997 - El Camino (Part 2) (12") Yellow Productions
- 1997 - Lost Illusions (CD, Maxi) CNR Music
- 1997 - Moonflower (CD, Maxi) CNR Music
- 1998 - El Camino (Part 1) (12") Yellow Productions
- 1998 - El Camino Project (CD, Maxi) Yellow Productions
- 1998 - Innerside (12") Yellow Productions, en 2002 sur Epic
- 1998 - Innerside (CD, Single) Columbia Records
- 1998 - Yellow Dance Classics (12")Yellow Productions
- 1999 - Carry On (12") Sony Music Entertainment (France)
- 1999 - Innerside '99 Remixes - Part 1 (12") Distance Records
- 1999 - Pray (12") Distance / Promo sur Epic
- 1999 - Pray (Bob Sinclar Remixes) (12" sur Columbia / CD Maxi sur Distance)
- 2001 - Fallin' In Love (12")Epic
- 2001 - Hermosa Maria (12") Epic
- 2002 - All I Wanna Give You (Part 5 / 5) (12")Epic
- 2002 - El Camino Part 1/5 (12") Epic
- 2002 - Fallin' In Love & Hermosa Maria (Part 4 / 5) (12")Epic
- 2002 - Pray / Carry On (Remixes Part 3 / 5) (12")Epic
- 2004 - Beautiful (Mixed CD Sampler) (CD, Promo) Universal Licensing Music (ULM)
- 2004 - On & On / Latin Break EP (CD, Maxi / 12", EP) Universal Licensing Music (ULM)
- 2005 - My Heart (12") Universal Licensing Music (ULM)
- 2006 - This Is Your Life (12") Shazz Music
- 2008 - Mazz (Max Campo & Shazz present) Flashback 90/Musik sequence (Digital) Resolution Records

== Remixes ==
- 1994 - Habibe (2x12", Promo) Habibe (Shazz Deep)
- 1995 - Manureva (Shazz Mixes) (12", Promo, W/Lbl) Epic
- 1995 - The Tunnel (Remixes) (12") The Tunnel (Shazz & Tommy Marcus) Resolution Records
- 1995 - Bohème (The Remixes) (CD, Maxi) Bohème (Abstract Mix) Sony Music Entertainment (France)
- 1995 - Boheme (2xCD) Boheme (Orange Mix) Epic
- 1995 - Nova Nova (CD, Album) D.J.G.G. (Orange Mix) F Communications
- 1995 - Un Film Snob Pour Martien (Shazz Remixes) (12") Columbia Records
- 1996 - Eau Et Vent (Remixes Shazz) (12") au Et Vent (The Awake) Columbia Records
- 1996 - I'm The Baddest Bitch (Remixes) (CD, Maxi) F Communications
- 1999 - Distance Sampler (CD) If She Only Knew (Shazz remix)Distance
- 2001 - Latin House Vol. 2 (CD) Afro-Dissiac (Choice Productions)
- 2002 - Natural House (2xCD) Afrodisiac (Shazz Remix) Debaile Muxxic
- 2003 - Afrodisiac (12") Afrodisiac (Shazz Remix) Denote Records
- 2004 - Mua Mua Mua - Raul Paz (Shazz Remix) Naïve Records
- 2004 - Here Comes The Sun (12") (Shazz & Tommy Marcus) Resolution Records
- 2004 - Lounge Candelas Version 2 (2xCD) Afro-Dissiac (Med Musik)

== Production ==
- 1993 - Aurora Borealis (CD, Maxi) Fnac Music Dance Division
- 1993 - Teknoville (2xCD) Acid Eiffel Antler-Subway
- 1996 - Technomania (2xCD) Aurora Borealis (Orange) Arcade
- 2000 - The Other Side of Absolute Ego (CD) Kyou Made No Yuuutsu (Ki/oon Records)

== Mixing ==
- 1993 - Acid Eiffel / How Do You Plead? (12") Fragile Records
- 1993 - Aurora Borealis (CD, Maxi) Fnac Music Dance Division
- 1993 - Paris EP (CD, EP)Fnac Music Dance Division
- 1994 - La Collection (2xCD) Lost Illusions (Joli M) Rough Trade Germany
- 1997 - Paris EP (CD, EP) CNR Music
- 1997 - Quarter EP (CD, Maxi) CNR Music
- 1999 - TranscenDance - The Best Of Trance (2xCD)Acid Eiffel Factory Music Productions, BMG Records (France)

== Various ==
- 1993 - Nouveau EP (CD, EP) Fnac Music Dance Division
- 1993 - Paris EP (CD, EP) Fnac Music Dance Division
- 1993 - Quarter EP (CD, EP) Fnac Music Dance Division
- 1994 - Blanc EP (CD, EP) F Communications
- 1994 - Freezone 1 - The Phenomenology Of Ambient (2xCD, Comp) La Couleur SSR Records
- 1994 - La Collection (2xCD) Lost Illusions (Joli M) Rough Trade Germany
- 1995 - Cyber Trance (CD + CD-ROM) Quarter 1: La Couleur Javelin Ltd
- 1995 - Technophunk (CD) No Work Today Rumour Records
- 1995 - Two Years Together (CD) Intro Not On Label
- 1996 - Laboratoire Mix (2xCD) Acid Eiffel Level 2
- 1996 - No. 1 Techno (CD) Aurora Borealis PolyGram
- 1997 - The Earth EP (12", EP, TP) My Angels Basenotic Records
- 1999 - One Starry Night (Special Edition) (CD, Album + CD, Comp) If She Only Knew (Shazz Mix)Distance
- 1999 - TranscenDance - The Best Of Trance (2xCD) Acid Eiffel Factory Music Productions, BMG
- 2002 - Paradisiac 4 (2xCD, Dig) Lounging Around ULM Electro
- 2003 - Bar Lounge Classics Summer Edition (CD, Dig + CD)Lounging Around Sony Music Media (Germany)
- 2003 - Erotic Lounge (Deluxe Edition) (2xCD) Fallin' In Love Sony Music Media (Germany)
- 2003 - French Power (CD) Fallin' In Love Sony Music Entertainment (Poland)
- 2004 - Osunlade Presents The Yoruba Soul Mixes (3x12") All I Wanna Give You Rapster Records
- 2004 - Vocal Jazz - Les nouvelles voix du jazz (CD) ULM TV Market
- 2006 - The Kings Of Techno (2xCD) Acid Eiffel Rapster Records
- 2007 - Back In The Box (2xCD, Sli) El Camino (DJ Gregory remix) NRK Sound Division
- 2007 - Josh Wink's Acid Classics (CD) Acid Eiffel Mixmag
- 2008 - Elegant Funk (CD, Promo) Carry On Savage!
- 2008 - Hotel Costes n°11 (CD) Mirage, Hello Mademoiselle Shazz Remix, Pschent Music
