= List of Linebarrels of Iron episodes =

Linebarrels of Iron
- Cover of the first DVD volume released in Japan by JVC.
- Native name
- Kanji: 鉄のラインバレル
- Revised Hepburn: Kurogane no Rainbareru
- No. of episodes: 24

Release
- Original network: TBS, CBC, Sun-TV
- Original release: October 3, 2008 – March 20, 2009

Linebarrels of Iron is an anime series adapted from the manga of the same title by Eiichi Shimizu and Tomohiro Shimoguchi. Directed by Masamitsu Hidaka and produced by Gonzo, the season was broadcast on the Tokyo Broadcasting System (TBS) from October 3, 2008, to March 20, 2009. The story centers around Kouichi Hayase, a fourteen-year-old boy living a mediocre life until an accident turns him into the pilot of a gigantic robot called "Linebarrel", as well as lead him to encounter a mysterious girl named Emi Kizaki.

Though the episodes aired first on TBS, Chubu-Nippon Broadcasting (CBC) and Sun Television (Sun-TV) also broadcast the series; CBC aired it within an hour after TBS's initial broadcasts, and Sun-TV aired the episodes a week later. Also, in an agreement, in which Gonzo's corporate parent, the GDH group, decided to allow popular video-sharing websites to stream some of Gonzo's latest anime titles, Crunchyroll, an anime-sharing site, streams episodes of the Linebarrels of Iron anime two hours after its premiere in Japan.

Five pieces of theme music are used for the anime series: one opening theme, two ending themes and two insert songs. The opening theme is "Kitei no Tsurugi" (鬼帝の剣; lit. Sword of the Demon King) by the Japanese band Ali Project, and the ending themes are "Ame ga Furu" (雨が降る) and "Remedy" by Maaya Sakamoto. The insert songs are "Kokoro no Mama ni" (心のままに, State of My Heart) and "PROUD" by Lisa Komine. An instrumental version of "Kitei no Tsurugi" was also used as an insert song in episode 20. The Ali Project released the "Kitei no Tsurugi" single on November 19, 2008. "Ame ga Furu", Maaya's seventeenth single, was released on October 29, 2008, and "Remedy" was released within Maaya's sixth album, Kazeyomi, on January 14, 2009.

As of June 24, 2009, JVC Entertainment has released a total of eight DVD volumes in Japan, with the first being released on December 24, 2008, and the last on July 22, 2009. Each volume contains one disc, with each one containing three episodes, save the first volume, which contains only the first episode. Every volume also contains extras, ranging from Drama CDs to original illustrations by the creator.

== Episode list ==
No.	Title	Directed by	Written by	Original release date
1	"The Iron and the Boy"; Transliteration: "Kurogane to Shōnen" (Japanese: クロガネと少年)	Masamitsu Hidaka	Kiyoko Yoshimura	October 3, 2008
Kouichi Hayase is a high school student who is often ridiculed at school by delinquents, but dreams of one day becoming a hero. Forced to buy stuff for his schoolmates, he decides to take a shortcut through a forest, which is when a giant object falls on him. After regaining consciousness, he sees a giant robot in front him and a naked girl lying beside him. He covers her with his jacket, and after waking, she is revealed to have partial amnesia and goes with him to his house. Soon after, other giant robots begin to attack the town. The girl tells Kouichi that the attacking robots are enemies, and goes into town with the intent of fighting them. Following her, Kouichi encounters his friend, Hideaki Yajima, who plans to use himself as bait in order for the two to get away. After Kouichi reveals his frustration in not being able to do anything, the girl reveals her name, Emi Kizaki, and has him summon a giant robot, known as a Machina called Linebarrel. Though he defeats the enemies with his newfound power, he is shocked when Emi tells him that he is dead.
2	"Justice Barreling Along"; Transliteration: "Shissō Suru Seigi" (Japanese: 疾走する正義)	Hiroyuki Okuno	Kiyoko Yoshimura	October 10, 2008
At an unknown location, the Katou Organization, which belongs to an organization bent on capturing the Machina Linebarrel, and JUDA, which is publicly known for being the world's largest medical equipment maker, are engaged in a heated battle. With JUDA's forces being overpowered, they ask for reinforcements, which comes in the form of another Machina called Vardant and its pilot, Reiji Moritsugu. As he handles the enemy, the other members of JUDA are discussing the recent actions of their enemy, the Katou Organization. Meanwhile, Kouichi's family welcomes Emi into their household, and Kouichi shows his newfound abilities and confidence at school by exacting revenge on the delinquents. Later, Kouichi expresses his gratitude to Emi for having killed him, giving him a new life, after which the Katou Organization begins a new attack to lure out the Linebarrel. Kouichi is thrown into battle once again, and two of JUDA's Machinas are also in the fray in an effort to stop the enemy as well. Kouichi, however, declares that he is the only real "justice", and goes on to fight both sides, not realizing the collateral damage he is causing. After the Machinas retreat and Kouichi declares his job done, Emi and Yajima are stunned to see his actions and the damage he has caused.
3	"Azure Terror"; Transliteration: "Ao no Kyōfu" (Japanese: 青の恐怖)	Masaharu Tomoda	Kiyoko Yoshimura	October 17, 2008
Kouichi has caused massive damage to the town during his battle on Linebarrel fighting the secret Katou Organization. Kizaki feels guilty for getting the citizens entangled in the battle, but Kouichi himself has no such notion, truly believing that he is the hero of justice. Then, Vardant, controlled by JUDA's ace pilot Reiji Moritsugu, appears before Kouichi.
4	"The Price of Justice"; Transliteration: "Seigi no Daishō" (Japanese: 正義の代償)	Katsuya Kikuchi	Kiyoko Yoshimura	October 24, 2008
Having lost Linebarrel, Kouichi gives in to despair and violently takes his anger out on innocent civilians. Since he is a factor, no one can match his physical power unarmed. On behalf of Risako Niiyama who is worried about Kouichi, Yajima decides to confront Kouichi. In the pouring rain, Yajima and Kouichi engage in a fistfight, when a Hagure Machina appears before them.
5	"Guidepost to Tomorrow"; Transliteration: "Ashita e no Dōhyō" (Japanese: 明日への道標)	Michita Shiraishi	Kiyoko Yoshimura	October 31, 2008
Kouichi loses consciousness due to Linebarrel going out of control, and is taken into custody by JUDA. Ishigami tells Kouichi about the Machinas, and the Katou Organization as their enemy. Kouichi is persuaded by Ishigami to fight together as a hero of justice, but cannot make up his mind. Meanwhile, Shizuna and Izuna Endo, twin members of JUDA's Special Task Force, were being attacked by the Armas of the Katou Organization and now have their backs against the wall.
6	"A Radiant Night"; Transliteration: "Akarui Yoru" (Japanese: 明るい夜)	Takashi Kobayashi	Kiyoko Yoshimura	November 7, 2008
Kouichi becomes a member of JUDA, and starts his duties while commuting to school from JUDA quarters. He is overwhelmed by the JUDA facilities, which include employees' housing and shopping malls. The members of the Special Task Force decide to throw a welcome party for Kouichi, who gradually comes to understand his true mission as an ally of justice.
7	"The Worse After-School Hours Ever"; Transliteration: "Saiaku na Hōkago" (Japanese: サイアクな放課後)	Shigeki Hatakeyama	Kiyoko Yoshimura	November 14, 2008
Domyouji, one of Kouichi's classmates, starts acting over-familiar toward Kizaki. Sensing Kizaki's discomfort, Kouichi challenges Domyouji to a fight, but oddly enough, cannot even touch him. Later on, Kouichi is visited by Hisataka Katou, president of the Katou Organization, who attempts to offer him a position in the Katou Organization. It is revealed that both Kizaki and Katou are from a different dimension. Meanwhile, Risako confronts Kizaki concerning her relationship with Kouichi.
8	"Playful Devils"; Transliteration: "Tawamure no Onitachi" (Japanese: 戯れの鬼たち)	Hiroyuki Okuno	Kiyoko Yoshimura	November 21, 2008
Kouichi, Moritsugu, and Miu are given a mission to assist the retreat of a U.S. Force transportation aircraft and to exterminate the enemy there. It is the first official assignment for Kouichi. Kouichi and Moritsugu team up and take on Masaki Sugawara and Yurianne Faithful of the Katou Organization, who are leading a vast troop of Armas. Meanwhile, Miu, who is backing up the retreat of general troops on Painkiller, is attacked by a new enemy Machina.
9	"The Black Chamber"; Transliteration: "Burakku Chenbā" (Japanese: ブラック·チェンバー)	Manabu Ono	Shigeru Morita	November 28, 2008
In order to investigate the mysterious "Spheres" deposited in various locations around the world by the Katou Organization, members of the JUDA task force, including Kouichi, head to an ARMA production base located in South America. Distracted by guilt for not being able to recognize Moritsugu's physical disorder, Satoru Yamashita makes a blunder during the operation and ends up putting Moritsugu in danger. Yamashita becomes panic-stricken, loses control, and starts taking matters into his own hands.
10	"Over Drive" (Japanese: OVER DRIVE)	Tatsuya Abe	Kiyoko Yoshimura	December 5, 2008
Christmas season has arrived. Kouichi is invited to a party Risako is organizing. Kouichi finds out that the JUDA task force is also preparing a Christmas party. Unlike Kouichi, who feels unenthusiastic about this "workplace" party, it is more of a family party for most of the members who consider JUDA their home. The party mood is suddenly interrupted by the news of an American satellite weapon being taken over by the Katou Organization. This would allow the Katou Organization to attack any part of the world. Assigned to shoot down the satellite weapon, Kouichi and Yamashita head into outer space.
11	"Super Nova" (Japanese: SUPER NOVA)	Katsuya Kikuchi	Kiyoko Yoshimura	December 12, 2008
Kouichi and Yamashita are met by a new Arma of the Katou Organization, called Yaoyorozu, in outer space. While controlling the satellite weapon, Yaoyorozu, piloted by Riku Ousei, continues its simultaneous assault on different parts of the world. Kouichi's attempts to obliterate Yaoyorozu are thwarted by its incredible maneuverability and speed. The operation to destroy the satellite weapon from the ground also ends in failure. With no options left, even Linebarrel gets diverted off the combat zone.
12	"From the Tropics with Love"; Transliteration: "Nankai yori Ai o Komete" (Japanese: 南海より愛をこめて)	Takashi Kobayashi	Kiyoko Yoshimura	December 19, 2008
The members of the JUDA task force have come to a tropical island as a company outing. Thanks to the good-natured whim of Kunio Ishigami, Risako and Domyouji have also been invited to join them. Kouichi finds himself in an uncomfortable position as Domyouji asks him which is his true love interest, whether it is Risako or Kizaki. Their brief vacation is interrupted as the members go missing one by one by a mysterious creature with tentacles.
13	"Black Executioner"; Transliteration: "Sadāku Karei naru Ansatsu" (Japanese: ザダーク華麗なる暗殺)	Yū Nobuta	Kiyoko Yoshimura	December 26, 2008
The tropical vacation is still the hot topic discussed between Domyouji and the task force members. Only Kizaki does not seem to share their post-vacation hype. The vacation has also left an awkward rift between Kouichi and Kizaki. Kouichi and Yamashita are summoned to a meeting and head to Ishigami's room. At that instant, they hear a gunshot from Ishigami's room. Finding out that Moritsugu shot Ishigami, Kouichi is eager to battle him for what he has done. After Kouichi fails to take Moritsugu, Kizaki fights in his place.
14	"Shed is Blood, Lost are Tears"; Transliteration: "Nagareru Chi, Ushinau wa Namida" (Japanese: 流れる血、失うは涙)	Shigeki Hatakeyama	Shigeru Morita	January 9, 2009
Unexpected incidents occur one after another. Ishigami is mourned for his death, and the secrets of Linebarrel are revealed, leaving Kouichi in shock and others including Yui Ogawa in distress. Meanwhile, Eiji Kiriyama, who had aligned himself with the Katou Organization, continues to tighten his control over Japan until the country virtually falls into the hands of Kiriyama and the Katou Organization. JUDA is acknowledged as the anti-national armed group and is attacked by the Jinrai brigade of the Japan Self-Defense Forces. Kouichi tries to breach their defenses with Linebarrel, which is the only working Machina left.
15	"Vector"; Transliteration: "Bekutoru" (Japanese: ベクトル)	Masahiro Sekino	Kiyoko Yoshimura	January 16, 2009
Kouichi and Kizaki find a safe area and take a brief but much needed refuge. Kizaki, who is starting to regain her memory, confesses to Kouichi that she is afraid of recalling memories she had long ago lost. Seeing Kizaki desperately fighting her angst, Kouichi makes a certain resolution. However, their peace is short-lived as they are suddenly attacked by Idaten and Kagutsuchi, piloted by Takurō Sawatari and Dimitri Magarov.
16	"Judgment at Dusk"; Transliteration: "Tasogare no Danzai" (Japanese: 黄昏の断罪)	Shunichi Yoshizawa	Shigeru Morita	January 23, 2009
With a renewed sense of justice, the JUDA task force members begin their battle against the enemy. The first step is to regain JUDA which has been taken over by Kiriyama and his horde. While Kouichi diverts Kiriyama with Linebarrel, the others sneak into the facility via an emergency route. As they make their way in, they find that the facility is protected by JUDA's state-of-the-art security system, filled with unusual stages to prove their identities as the JUDA task force members.
17	"Mechanical Curse"; Transliteration: "Kikaijikake no Noroi" (Japanese: 機械じかけの呪い)	Katsuya Kikuchi	Kiyoko Yoshimura	January 30, 2009
Risako and Kouichi are puzzled when Yajima returns, trying to keep the secret of his so-called death. But behind the seemingly good comeback, Yajima reveals himself to be the pilot of Apparition, one of the new Machinas of the Katou Organization, before the rest of JUDA during their party. He later kidnaps Kizaki, fulfilling a mission from Katou.
18	"Memento Mori"; Transliteration: "Memento Mori" (Japanese: メメント·モリ)	Yukio Nishimoto	Kiyoko Yoshimura	February 6, 2009
Following Yajima's instructions, Kouichi reaches an abandoned Russian base in search for Kizaki, but it was only Katou who was waiting for him there. Meanwhile, Yajima questions Kizaki about her feelings for Kouichi and the rest of the JUDA team struggles to protect Misaki Town from an invasion from the enemy.
19	"Light Reaches, Shadow is Uncovered"; Transliteration: "Todoku Hikari, Abakareru Kage" (Japanese: 届く陽、暴かれる陰)	Takashi Kobayashi	Kiyoko Yoshimura	February 13, 2009
Glain-Neidr, piloted by Masaki, appears in Misaki Town and starts to install the last Sphere. Miu, Yamashita, and the Jinrai brigade, led by Domyouji, return fire, but are no match. Meanwhile, Kouichi rescues Kizaki and heads back to the JUDA headquarters, to which he is stopped by Yajima. Yajima insists that Kouichi stop fighting and return to Risako. The two are unable to reconcile. On the beach in the pouring rain, Yajima and Kouichi exchange blows using Linebarrel and Apparition.
20	"Man of Destiny"; Transliteration: "Unmei no Hito" (Japanese: 運命の男)	Michita Shiraishi	Kiyoko Yoshimura	February 20, 2009
Since the last battle, Miu's slump hasn't gone away and with Painkiller unable to advance, has further prolonged her state. Miu' reckless drive to train has left her body and spirit broken. Miu finally cheers up when Kouichi comes to visit. Meanwhile, the Katou Organization has set up Spheres throughout the world on a large-scale trajectory to open up a multidimensional invasion. Shizuna and Izuna are dismayed to see the United Nations siding with the Katou Organization. Kouichi and Miu set out to help fight against Sobi Nakajima and Yurianne.
21	"Wings of Madness"; Transliteration: "Kyōki no Tsubasa" (Japanese: 狂気の翼)	Yū Nobuta	Shigeru Morita	February 27, 2009
The JUDA Corporation is now responsible in holding back the launch of the Spheres installed. However, Yamashita has a different mobilization unit out, after receiving a letter designating him to fulfill a special duty surrounding a secret reunion around the base of Mount Fuji near the Aokigahara Sea of Trees. It is there and then that Yamashita must face off against Moritsugu. Meanwhile, the rest of the JUDA members are shocked to that Kiriyama is still alive, as he demonstrates his newfound power in an attempt to obliterate them.
22	"That which Devours Demons"; Transliteration: "Oni o Kurau Mono" (Japanese: 鬼を喰らうモノ)	Shunichi Yoshizawa	Kiyoko Yoshimura	March 6, 2009
Kouichi sees a powerful Moritsugu before him, after seeing a wounded Yamashita near him. Moritsugu prepares himself to show the members of JUDA their inexperience and lack of power. Unable to gain enough power and strength against Moritsugu, Kouichi is left almost helpless. Linebarrel struggles for power as Vardant ensues in a violent battle. Later on, Kato reveals that Kizaki is his sister, as well as how he developed the Kato Organization. Kato then proposes the JUDA Corporation to join forces with the Kato Organization to assist in the prevention of an enemy invasion arriving from an alternate dimension.
23	"The Way of Life Determined by the Way of Death"; Transliteration: "Shinikata ga Kimeru Ikikata" (Japanese: 死に方が決める生き方)	Katsuya Kikuchi	Kiyoko Yoshimura	March 13, 2009
The JUDA Corporation and the Kato Organization prepare to defend the earth against the upcoming enemy invasion led by Masaki. Kouichi and his Linebarrel take it upon themselves to drive the invaders into the space-time continuum and back into their respective dimension. Kato sacrifices himself in battle, protect the rest of the group. As Kouichi and his Linebarrel blast off into space, Kizaki initiates a surprise attack against the infiltrators. However, this attack eventually would cost her life.
24	"Flowers of Steel"; Transliteration: "Kōtetsu no Hana" (Japanese: 鋼鉄の華)	Masahiro Sekino	Kiyoko Yoshimura	March 20, 2009
Due to Kizaki's death, Kouichi goes berserk and showcases the true and ultimate form of Linebarrel. After a failed attempt to send the invaders back to their dimension, Kizaki appears to Kouichi in spirit form, telling him never to give up. With that mindset of motivation, he is about to destroy one of the enemy warships. However, this results in an instability of the space-time continuum between dimensions. Kouichi makes the choice to go inside the rift, and the rest of the JUDA members send their D-S.O.I.L. energies of their Machinas toward Kouichi, in order to save the world. Kouichi is able to return from the rift, and Kizaki has been revived from Linebarrel.
OVA	"Pretty Girl Genius Scientist Rachel-chan"; Transliteration: "Tensai Bishoujo Kagakusha Rachel-chan" (Japanese: 天才美少女科学者レイチェルちゃん)	Shunichi Yoshizawa	Kiyoko Yoshimura	August 7, 2009
This is a prologue of Rachel Calvin's first visit to Japan. There is also a short second part of Rachel broadcasting her own show about the JUDA Corporation.
OVA–2	"Shadows of Iron"; Transliteration: "Tetsu no Kage" (Japanese: 鉄の影)	Katsuya Kikuchi	Kiyoko Yoshimura	August 7, 2009
After saving the world, Kouichi and his friends take a break at their JUDA Corporation spa resort. Kouichi attempts to confess his feelings toward Kizaki, however a group of Linebarrels begin to attack the headquarters before he gets a chance. The group of Linebarrels are later discovered to be clones of the original Linebarrel. Kouichi and Kizaki unable to activate the original Linebarrel, rendering him useless to fight back. Nonetheless, Linebarrel instinctively awakens once again, and the two annihilate the echoes.
