= Chaos (2001 film) =

2001 French film directed by Coline Serreau

- Film poster
- Directed by: Coline Serreau
- Written by: Coline Serreau
- Produced by: Christine Gozlan; Alain Sarde
- Starring: Vincent Lindon; Catherine Frot; Rachida Brakni
- Cinematography: Jean-François Robin
- Edited by: Catherine Renault
- Music by: Saint Germain
- Distributed by: StudioCanal; BAC Films
- Release date: 3 October 2001
- Running time: 109 minutes
- Country: France
- Language: French
- Budget: $8.6 million
- Box office: $6.2 million

Chaos is a 2001 French drama film written and directed by Coline Serreau. It was Serreau's ninth film, about a Parisian woman who befriends an Algerian prostitute after witnessing an accident, changing both their lives.

== Plot ==
Paul and Hélène, a wealthy Parisian couple, are preparing to go out for the evening. While driving, they see three men chasing a prostitute down the street. She begs them to save her by letting her into the car, but Paul locks the doors and drives away as the men savagely beat her, leaving her unconscious in the street. He refuses to let Hélène phone an ambulance, afraid of being charged with not helping a person in danger.

Hélène cannot forget the incident, and next day goes to the hospital, and finds the prostitute, Noémie, in a coma. Hélène stops work and leaves her family responsibilities to stay with Noémie throughout her recovery, aiding her as she regains mobility and speech. When one of the pimps returns and threatens Noémie, Hélène follows him out of the hospital and knocks him unconscious with a plank, leaving him for the police to find.

Meanwhile, Paul and Hélène's son Fabrice, a university student, is cheating on his girlfriend with a girl, who is pregnant. When his girlfriend discovers the truth, she trashes his apartment and he moves back to Paul's apartment just as Hélène moves out; the two girls follow him, much to Paul's chagrin.

When Hélène returns home for a day, one of Noémie's pimps goes to the hospital and removes her under the pretense of being a relatives taking her for a walk. Noémie, who still cannot speak, is unable to protest. Realising what has happened, Hélène follows them, accosts the pimps on the street, and takes her to Paul's mother's house in the country. There, Noémie recovers her ability to talk, and explains her life story:

Her name is actually Malika, the child of poor French-Algerian immigrants. At 17, her father attempted to sell her into an arranged marriage and she fled. She was picked up by a pimp, named Touki, and sold into sexual slavery getting her hooked on heroin. She convinced Touki to move to Paris to speak to her step-mother and retrieve her passport. Her family kicked her out, and she formed plans to leave her life of forced prostitution behind. She got off drugs and opened up an account with her sister, Zora's passport to put some money behind. She tried going to SOS Racisme for help, but was dismissed. She moved to Geneva and seduced a rich man and got him to give her all of his money and jewelry, just before he died. She and Touki returned to Paris with the money. However, the man's family went to the press claiming that their money was stolen from the bank. Her pimps found out that she laundered the money for herself and beat her into signing a proxy. She escaped, with Touki and the other two pimps chasing after her, which was when Hélène and her husband came across her one evening.

The two women plan Malika's freedom and revenge on her abusers. Hélène tells Malika that her husband was the one who locked the doors of their car during her attack, but Malika doesn't care. Later, she manages to distract Paul at the Basel airport, while looking for Hélène, and has sex with him. All three manage to get on the same flight back to Paris, with Malika keeping her distance, to avoid the police. Hélène finally stands up to the selfishness of her husband and son. Paul falls madly in love with Malika, going frantic when she doesn't call. Fabrice also falls in love with her.

Hélène and Malika set up the pimps and their gang to be arrested by the police. Touki is shot trying to escape. Malika returns to her estranged family and tells her sister, Zora, that she will be forced into marriage as soon as she's old enough, just as Malika was at her age. To save her, she begs her sister to come with her to live in freedom, but she refuses, saying she loves them.

Malika meets up with Paul again and she takes him to his mother's house. When Zora is beaten by her brothers, her father reveals that she will indeed be married to an older man soon. Malika and Hélène rush to Marseilles and stop Malika's father from sending Zora off to a forced marriage. Her father curses her and she replies that it is the first time he has ever given her anything. The film ends with Malika, Hélène, Zora and Paul's mother sitting on a bench gazing at the sun.

== Cast ==
- Vincent Lindon as Paul Vidal
- Catherine Frot as Hélène Vidal
- Rachida Brakni as Noémie/Malika
- Line Renaud as Mamie, Paul's mother
- Aurélien Wiik as Fabrice, son of Hélène and Paul
- Ivan Franek as Touki
- Michel Lagueyrie as Marsat
- Wojciech Pszoniak as Pali
- Éric Poulain as the young policeman
- Omar-Echériff Attalah as Tarek, father of Malika
- Hajar Nouma as Zora, younger sister of Malika
- Chloé Lambert as Florence
- Marie Denarnaud as Charlotte
- Vincent Branchet as Raoul
- Jean-Marc Stehlé as Blanchet
- Léa Drucker as Nicole
- Valérie Benguigui as a doctor
- Gilles Cohen as a doctor
- Marc Prin as the Blanchet boy
- Vincent Pannetier as a customer at L'Horloge café

== Background ==
One reviewer notes "Chaos reconfigures the parameters of identity for both Hélène and Noémie in a nearly mythic tale of female solidarity and triumph". The fast-moving, hard-hitting beginning sets the pace for the rest of the film, with little respite between "twists in the plot and polemic arguments". After the film has focused on the "tragic fate of Malika", the elements of thriller continue, but never disconnected from reality. The domestic chaos of the Vidal family members matches that of the centre of their attention, and is mirrored in the deliberate style of direction, leading, both cheerfully and fiercely, to a state of order at the end.

Brakni, in her first leading film role (who was rehearsing for Ruy Blas at the Comédie-Française at the time of the film), is described as athletic, "lithe, gorgeous and possessed of a penetrating intelligence" and the development "from bookish young student to the sophisticated but hard-as-nails prostie" was praised. Loudon had appeared previously in two Serreau films, La Crise in 1992 and La Belle Verte in 1996.

The jazz-based soundtrack is by St Germain (Ludovic Navarre), although the film closes with the Air from the Goldberg Variations in a two-piano arrangement. Locations were in Paris, Marseille and Geneva.

== Awards and honors ==
- César Award for Most Promising Actress (Rachida Brakni) and nominations for Best Film, Best Original Screenplay or Adaptation, Best Actress, and Best Actress in a Supporting Role (Line Renaud) in 2002.
- Lumières prize for Most Promising Actress (Rachida Brakni) in 2002.
- People's Choice and Critic's Choice at the Norwegian International Film Festival 2002.

== Reception ==
The film is described as "a moral fable" by a reviewer in Femme Actuelle, "radical, bright, very moving but not without humour" by Le Journal de Dimanche, "a defiant and upsetting storm" by Ciné Live and a "black comedy, drama and thriller all in one" by Télé Loisirs. The film was shot on digital video, and one critic noted that "while the medium may have facilitated the film-making process, the video “look” contributes absolutely nothing to an otherwise carefully made venture".

The film was shown in 40 screens in Paris and in 433 cinemas in France with over a million entries recorded.

On review aggregation website Rotten Tomatoes, the film has an approval rating of 85% based on 52 reviews. Review aggregator Metacritic gave the film a score of 81 out of 100 based on 15 critics, indicating "universal acclaim". Stephen Holden of The New York Times described the film as "gripping feminist fable with a savage comic edge". The film was included in the Berlinale in 2002. In 2007 several Sight and Sound critics included Chaos in a list of 75 hidden gems of "familiar, cool, but forgotten" films.

The DVD 9 of the film was issued in 2002 by Studio Canal, including a 'making-of' feature, filmographies of the five leading actors, and a filming notebook by the director.
