= No More Tears (Modjo song) =

Single by Modjo

from the album Modjo
- Released: 18 January 2002
- Genre: Disco
- Length: 6:15
- Label: PolyGram
- Songwriters: Romain Tranchart; Yann Destagnol
- Producer: Romain Tranchart

Modjo singles chronology
"What I Mean" (2001)	"No More Tears" (2002)	"On Fire" (2002)

"No More Tears" is a song by French house duo Modjo. It was released in January 2002 as the fourth single from their only self-titled studio album (2001).

== Track listings ==
1. "No More Tears" (radio edit)
2. "No More Tears" (Step/House Mix by Play Paul)
3. "No More Tears" (Wuz Remix By Alex Gopher)
4. "No More Tears" (album version)

== Charts ==
Chart performance for "No More Tears"
Chart (2002)	Peak position
Australia (ARIA)	85
Belgium (Ultratip Bubbling Under Wallonia)	10
Romania (Romanian Top 100)	66
Switzerland (Schweizer Hitparade)	91
