= Vittorio Culpo =

French resistance member (1904–1955)

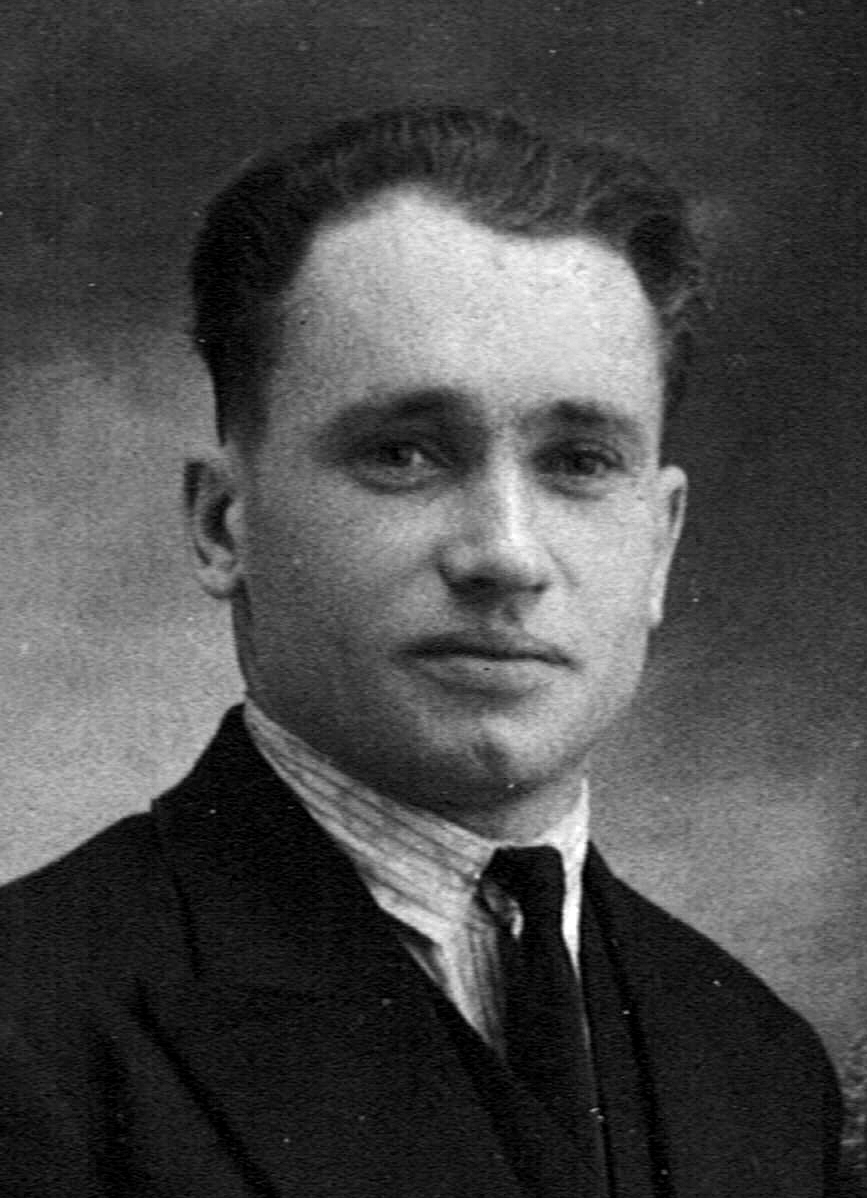
V. Culpo in 1936

Vittorio Culpo (1904–1955) was an Italo-French resistance soldier.

== Personal life ==
He was born in Trissino in provincia di Vicenza, Italy, in 1904, in a poor farmer's family. In 1923, after a violent brawl with a fascist squadron, he fled to the mountains. He was actively pursued by Benito Mussolini's military police. He went to France and settled in Moselle, before joining some Italian friends in Auvergne, where he worked peacefully until the beginning of World War II.

== World War involvement ==
During the initial year of the war (1939-1940), he fought for the 92nd infantry regiment and obtained French nationality. After the disarmament (1940), he joined the resistance of Val d'Allier. He helped organize a train attack on the Clermont-Ferrand line, when he was severely hurt. He never recovered fully from his injuries.

== Later life ==
He died in 1955 in Mirefleurs. His great grandson, Sébastien Culpo dedicated a short movie to him.

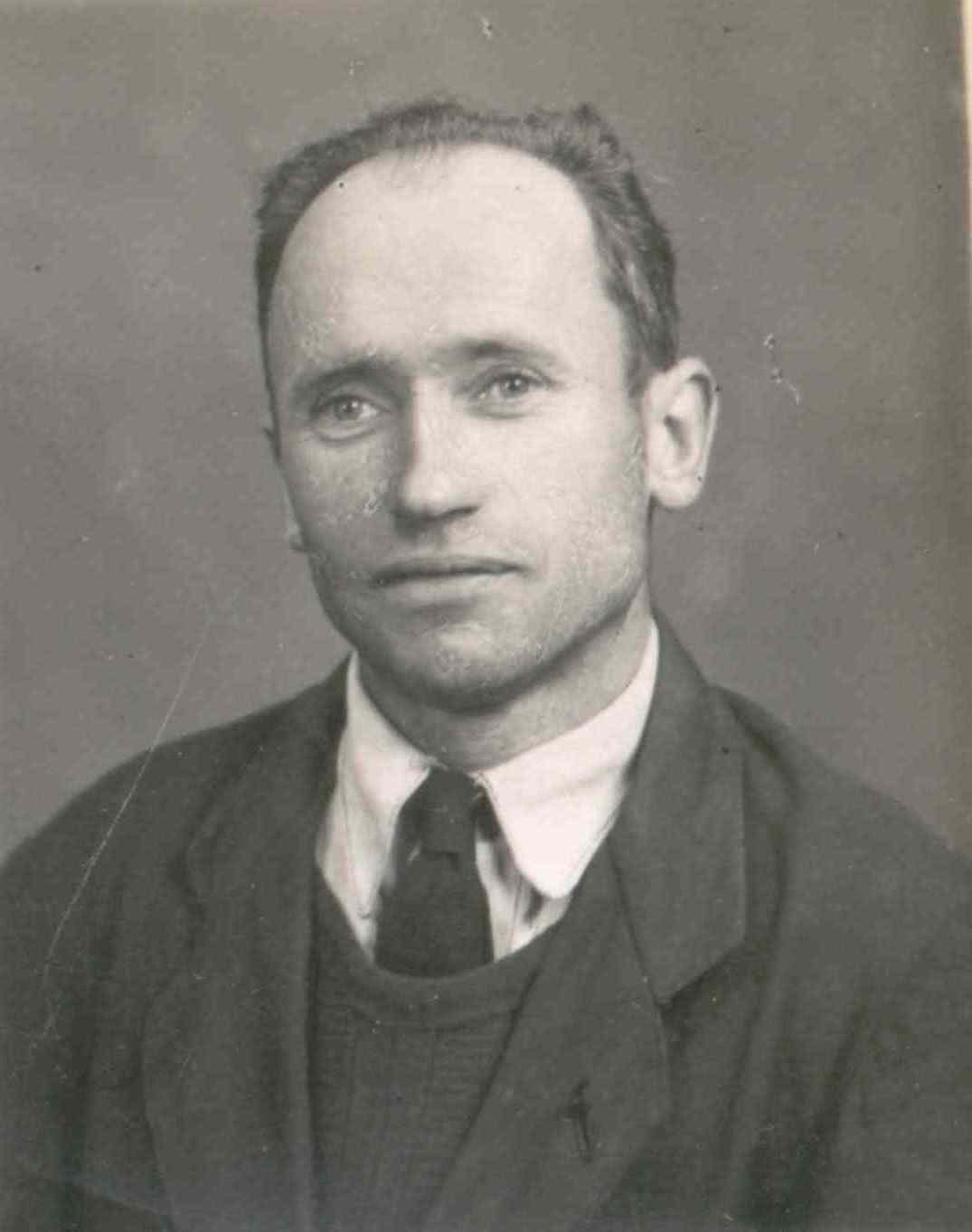
Vittorio Culpo just before his death
