= Momento =

Momento may refer to:

- Momento (album), a 2007 bossa nova album by Bebel Gilberto
- Memento (film), a 2000 American film written and directed by Christopher Nolan
- Momento Film, a Swedish film production company
- El Momento, a 2010 reggaeton/Latin pop album by Jowell y Randy
- "Un Momento", a 2010 Latin house/synthpop song by Inna
- 2C-iP (Momento), a psychedelic drug

== See also ==
- Memento (disambiguation)
