= Modjo =

French house music duo

- Origin: Paris, France
- Genres: French house; nu-disco; alternative dance
- Years active: 1999–2003
- Labels: Barclay; Universal
- Past members: Romain Tranchart; Yann Destal

Modjo was a French house music duo formed in Paris in 1999 by producer Romain Tranchart (born 9 June 1976) and singer Yann Destal (born Destagnol, 14 July 1978). Their biggest hit, "Lady (Hear Me Tonight)" was released in 2000, and was followed by "Chillin'" and "No More Tears", both released in 2001.

== Background ==
Born in Paris, Romain Tranchart moved with his family to Algeria and Mexico before settling in Brazil. There, he began learning the guitar, drawing inspiration from jazz classics. In 1998, influenced by DJ Sneak, Ian Pooley, and Daft Punk, Tranchart released his first single under the name Funk Legacy, titled "What You're Gonna Do, Baby", through Vertigo Records. He then attended the American School of Modern Music in Paris.

Also Parisian, Yann Destagnol learned to play the flute and clarinet as a small child. As he grew older, he became deeply influenced by the Beatles, the Beach Boys, David Bowie, and other pop acts. He started playing drums by emulating them and also learned to play the piano and guitar. He later bought a four-track recording machine and began singing and songwriting. Fascinated more by voices than by charismatic bandleaders, he admired bands such as Aerosmith, the Police, and Queen, and later became a fan of R&B divas.

The band stopped making music in 2003.

== Awards and nominations ==
Award	Year	Category	Nominee(s)	Ref.
International Dance Music Awards	2001	Best House/Garage 12"	"Lady (Hear Me Tonight)"	Won
MTV Europe Music Awards	2000	Best French Act	Themselves	Won
Smash Hits Poll Winners Party	2000	Best Dance Choon	"Lady (Hear Me Tonight)"	Nominated
Smash Hits Poll Winners Party	2000	Best Dance/Solo Act	Themselves	Nominated
Top of the Pops Awards	2003	Band of the Year	Themselves	Nominated

== Discography ==
=== Studio albums ===
List of studio albums, with selected chart positions
Title	Album details	Peak chart positions					
Title	Album details	FRA	AUS	AUT	FIN	GER	SWI
Modjo	Released: 18 September 2001; Label: Universal; Formats: CD	21	89	41	39	30	13

=== Singles ===
List of singles as lead artist, with selected chart positions and certifications, showing year released and album name
Title	Year	Peak chart positions									Certifications	Album
Title	Year	FRA	AUS	BEL	GER	NLD	SWE	SWI	UK	US	Certifications	Album
"Lady (Hear Me Tonight)"	2000	7	10	5	2	4	8	1	1	81	SNEP: Gold; ARIA: Gold; BPI: Platinum; BRMA: Gold; BVMI: Gold; IFPI SWI: Platinum	Modjo
"Chillin'"	2001	44	35	34	38	41	26	10	12	—		Modjo
"What I Mean"	2001	88	—	52	67	58	—	17	59	—		Modjo
"No More Tears"	2002	—	85	60	—	—	—	91	—	—		Modjo
"On Fire"	2002	—	—	—	—	—	—	—	—	—		Modjo
"—" denotes a recording that did not chart or was not released in that territory.

== See also ==
- List of one-hit wonders in the United States
- List of Billboard number-one dance club songs
- List of artists who reached number one on the U.S. Dance Club Songs chart
