= Christopher Culpo =

American-French composer and pianist

Christopher Culpo is an American-French composer and pianist, who has been living in France since 1991. As a performer and composer, Culpo lies at the confluence of contemporary classical music, jazz, and free improvisation. He has written chamber and symphonic music, vocal and opera, for the dance and the theatre, and has composed and improvised music for silent films. He has been commissioned by Radio France.

Culpo has earned degrees in composition from Boston University and The Juilliard School, where he studied amongst others with Milton Babbitt and David del Tredici. He also studied piano and improvisation with Charles Banacos. Following his studies at Juilliard Mr. Culpo was personal assistant to Aaron Copland and an active Teaching Artist for the Lincoln Center Institute. Since receiving a Fulbright scholarship to work with Tristan Murail in Paris in 1991, Mr. Culpo has lived and worked in Europe. His performing career has taken him on stages as diverse as the Cluny Jazz Festival, Jazz at Domergue, Rhino Jazz (France), Blossoms Festival (Belgium), The Old Town House, Athol Fugard Festival in Nieu Bethesda and the Forge (South Africa), Club Borgo, "Sestri Jazz Jazz La Spezia (Italy), the Radar Festival (Mexico), the Adelaide Cabaret Festival and the Sydney Opera House (Australia), or the Festival Christchurch (New Zealand).

As a performer Mr. Culpo has released many albums, most recently Mimesis and Speaking in Tongues with saxophonist Catherine Sikora. He also recorded his composition The Four Freedoms, based on the Norman Rockwell paintings, with a quartet featuring clarinetist Achille Succi, contrabassist Salvatore Maiore and trombonist Massimo Morganti.

In November 2019 Culpo’s composition Mundus Imaginalis for solo piano and strings was awarded second prize in the IV International Uuno Klami Composition Competition and was performed and recorded in Finland by the Kymi Sinfonietta. The South African College of Music’s Bowed Electrons Festival has invited Mr. Culpo several times. In 2019 he premiered The Books of Coincidence, a collaboration with South African artist and poet Anne Graaff. The piece, for solo piano, electronics, video, and recorded poetry was to receive its French premiere at the Festival Entre Temps in Avon before the festival was postponed due to Covid19. For the Bowed Electrons 2020 festival, streamed online, he collaborated again with Ms. Graaff and poet Douglas Reid Skinner to create Constellations for piano, electronics, and recorded poetry. His "After Midnight, Before Dawn" was praised by The Washington Post as "a strikingly vivid work that explores the elusive worlds of sleeping and dreaming, to hallucinogenic effect". In February 2012 Culpo was awarded the Clefworks composition prize and his Of Ground, or Air, or Ought- was premiered by the ETHEL quartet in Montgomery, Alabama. In 2013 Radio France commissioned Culpo to compose Murmurations for the national Orchestra of France.

Culpo's music is published by Les Editions Le Chant du Monde and Editions Musicales Contemporain. His albums are published by El Gallo Rojo Records and on Bandcamp.
