= St Germain (musician) =

French DJ (born 1969)

- Born: 10 April 1969 (age 57); Saint-Germain-en-Laye, Île-de-France, France
- Genres: House; deep house; jazz house; nu jazz; groove jazz
- Years active: 1991–present
- Labels: F Communications; Blue Note/EMI; Parlophone/Nonesuch
- Website: stgermain-music.com

Ludovic Navarre (French pronunciation: [lydovik navaʁ], born 10 April 1969), known by his stage name St Germain, is a French DJ and musical artist. His style has been described as a combination of house music and nu jazz music.

== Career ==
Navarre's album Boulevard was released in July 1995 and has sold over one million copies worldwide. His United States debut, Tourist, was released in 2000 and sold 300,000 copies in the USA and four million copies worldwide. Bob Marley, Toots & the Maytals, Miles Davis and Kool and the Gang are among Ludovic's early influences. He composed his first work under the name of Sub System with friend Guy Rabiller. He has released EPs under a number of aliases, among them Deepside, LN'S, Modus Vivendi, Nuages and Soofle.

St Germain is not associated with the Saint-Germain-des-Prés Café compilation series, though his song "Deep in It" is featured on its "Volume 1".

His song "Rose Rouge" was featured in the official movie trailer for Joss Whedon's 2013 Much Ado About Nothing.

His eponymous album, released on 9 October 2015, was recorded with the participation of African musicians, the album features traditional Malian instruments such as kora, balafon and ngoni, that mingle with electric guitars, pianos, saxophones and electronic loops. The first single, “Real Blues”, sets the voice of Lightnin' Hopkins to the beat of wild, fiery drums and percussion.

The original single sleeve is decorated with a 3D mask conceived by Urban Art creator Gregos, known for his smiling and frowning faces stuck on walls throughout Paris and Europe.

St Germain was included in the line-up for Coachella Valley Music and Arts Festival 2016.

== Discography ==
=== Albums ===
Year	Album	Peak positions										Certification
Year	Album	FR	AUS	AUT	BEL	GER	IT	NED	NOR	NZ	SUI	Certification
1995	Boulevard	32	–	–	33	–	–	9	–	–	–	
1999	From Detroit to St Germain (as Ludovic Navarre)	103	–	–	–	–	–	–	–	–	–	
2000	Tourist	5	23	23	3	76	8	3	9	8	37	ARIA: Platinum
2015	St Germain	15	–	43	2	92	29	11	–	19	22	

=== Singles/EPs ===
St Germain

- 1993: French Traxx EP
- 1993: Motherland EP
- 1994: Mezzotinto EP
- 1995: "Alabama Blues"
- 1996: "Muse Q The Music" (with Shazz and Derek Bays)
- 1996: "Alabama Blues (Revisited)"
- 2000: "Sure Thing"
- 2000: "Rose Rouge" ('I want you to get together') (Peaks: FR: No. 97, NED: No. 86)
- 2001: "Sure Thing Revisited"
- 2001: "Rose Rouge Revisited"
- 2001: "So Flute"
- 2002: "Chaos"
- 2004: Mezzotinto EP (re-release)
- 2015: "Real Blues" (Peaks: FR: No. 129)

Deepside/D.S.

- 1992: Seclude EP (with Guy Rabiller)
- 1992: Deepside EP (with Guy Rabiller)
- 1993: Tolérance EP
- 1994: Volume 1 & 2, as D.S.

Sub System
All produced with Guy Rabiller

- 1991: "Subhouse", as Sub System (with Guy Rabiller)
- 1991: "J'Ai Peur", as Sub System (with Guy Rabiller)
- 1991: "III", as Sub System (with Guy Rabiller)

Other aliases

- 1993: Nouveau EP, as Soofle
- 1993: Paris EP, as Choice
- 1993: "Modus Vivendi", as Modus Vivendi
- 1993: Inferno EP, as LN'S
- 1993: The Ripost EP, as Deep Contest (with DJ Deep (aka Cyril Étienne des Rosaies))
- 1994: "Burning Trash Floor", as Hexagone
- 1994: Blanc EP, as Nuages
- 1997: Paris EP (re-release), as Choice

(Co-)Production for other artists

- 1993: Orange - Quarter EP
- 1993: Shazz - "Lost Illusions"
- 1993: Laurent Garnier - A Bout de Souffle EP
- 1994: Shazz - "A View of Manhattan..."
- 1996: DJ Deep - "Signature"
- 2003: Soel - Memento

=== Remixes ===
- 1993: Aurora Borealis - "Aurora Borealis"
- 1993: Suburban Knight - "The Art of Stalking"
- 1995: Björk - "Isobel"
- 1997: Pierre Henry & Michel Colombier - "Jericho Jerk"
- 1999: Boy Gé Mendes - "Cumba Iétu"
- 2004: The Pink Panther Theme - (St Germain Remix)
- 2014: Gregory Porter - "Musical Genocide (St Germain Remix)"
