= Oh snap =

Oh Snap may refer to:

- Oh Snap (EP), an EP by the Christian rock band Philmont
- "London Bridge (Oh Snap)", a 2006 song by Fergie
- Oh Snap, a 2025 album by Cécile McLorin Salvant

== See also ==
- "Aw, Snap!", an error message in Chromium and Google Chrome; see About URI scheme § Chromium-specific about: URIs
- "Squats" (song), a 2015 song by Oh Snap! and Bombs Away
