= Bombs Away (group) =

Australian DJ vocal and producer duo

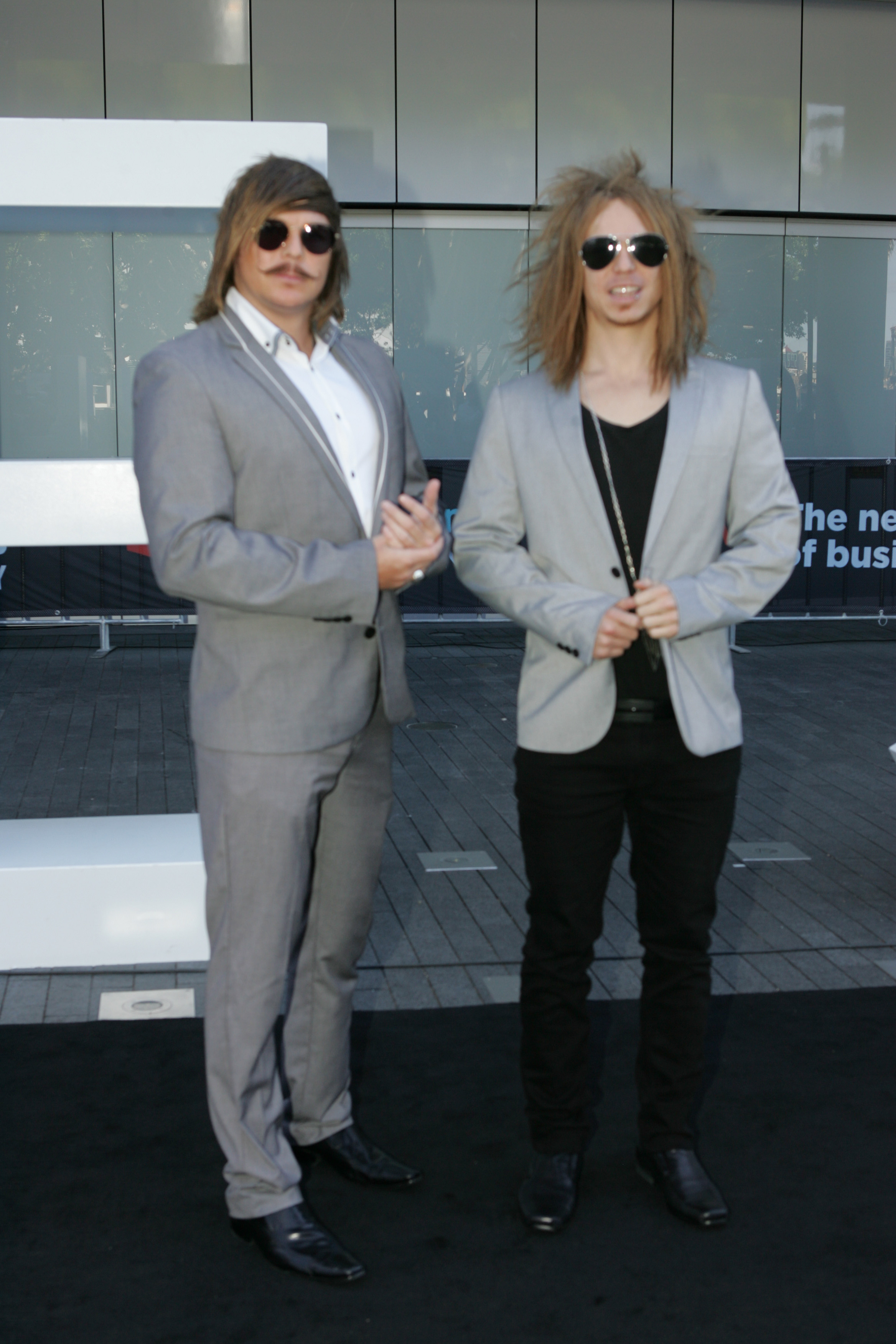
- Bombs Away at the ARIA Awards

Background information
- Origin: Australia
- Genres: Pop, electro house, Melbourne bounce, trap, Progressive House, Hip house
- Years active: 2010–present
- Labels: Central Station, Universal Music, Ministry of Sound Australia, Bomb Squad Records, Cloud 9 Records, Kontor Records, Radikal Records, Multiplayer Records
- Members: Sketch (Matthew Coleman); Tommy Shades (Thomas Coleman)
- Website: www.bombsawaymusic.com.au/fragments

Bombs Away is an Australian DJ vocal and producer duo consisting of Matthew and Thomas Coleman. They are best known for their top 40 2012 single "Party Bass".

== Career ==
Matthew and Thomas Coleman were born on the Gold Coast, Australia, before relocating to Perth early in their adult lives. They released their debut single "Big Booty Bitches" in 2010. The song reached number 3 on the Beatport Electro Top 100. and has been viewed more than 3 million times on YouTube, The song was certified gold in 2013. Their follow-up single "Swagger" was released in early 2011 and received national airplay on the Nova Network and the Today Network.

Bombs Away's third single "Super Soaker" was released in September 2011 and was certified platinum in 2012. In March 2012, they released a collaboration with DJ Kronic, titled "Looking for Some Girls", which reached number 7 on the ARIA Club Chart. Bombs Away's fifth single, "Get Stoopid", a collaboration with Seany B (the performer of the TV Rock single "Flaunt It"), was released in late 2012, and reached number 1 on the ARIA Club Chart and was ranked number 27 in the Top 50 Club Tracks of 2012 on the ARIA Charts. The majority of the film clip for "Get Stoopid" was filmed on the streets of Surfers Paradise, and featured cameo appearances from The Twins and DJ Kronic.

"Party Bass" was released in 2012 and peaked at number 25 on the ARIA Charts and was certified platinum. At the ARIA Music Awards of 2013, the song was nominated for ARIA Award for Song of the Year. "Drunk Arcade" debuted at number 15 on the ARIA Dance Singles Chart. The duo's original release "Assassinate", released in July 2013, reached number 4 on the Beatport Electro Release chart on 1 August.

In June 2018 Bombs Away released their debut studio album, Fragments, which included the singles "Like You", "Let You Down", "Before We Had a Label" and "Drive Me Home".

In July 2021, group member Matthew "Sketch" Coleman, announced his departure from the duo, announcing that he was departing from centre stage within the Australian music industry as a touring artist. However Sketch announced he is not entirely leaving the music industry, but instead further focusing on ventures in event management, the most known being the Schoolies end of year festivals on the Gold Coast.

== Discography ==
=== Albums ===
Title	Album details
Fragments	Released: 29 June 2018; Label: Central Station (DNA0293); Format: CD, digital download, streaming
Fragments Part 2 (B Sides and Remixes)	Released: 27 July 2018; Label: Central Station; Format: Digital download, streaming

=== Extended Play ===
Title	Album details
Party Bass (feat. The Twins)	Released: 2 April 2013; Label: Radikal Records; Format: Digital download, streaming
Ghetto Blaster - EP	Released: 29 April 2016; Label: Central Station Records; Format: Digital download, streaming

=== Singles ===
List of singles as lead artist, with selected chart positions and certifications
Title	Year	Peak chart positions	Certifications
Title	Year	AUS	Certifications
"Big Booty Bitches"	2010	55	ARIA: Gold
"Swagger"	2011	—	
"Super Soaker"	2011	83	ARIA: Platinum
"Looking for Some Girls" (featuring DJ Kronic)	2012	—	
"Get Stoopid" (with Seany B)	2012	—	
"Party Bass" (featuring The Twins)	2012	25	ARIA: Platinum
"Drunk Arcade" (featuring The Twins)	2013	67	
"Assassinate"	2013	—	
"Baseline Maniac/Rewind" (featuring Peep This & Bounce Inc)	2013	—	
"Better Luck Next Time"	2013	54	
"Mother Truckers"	2014	—	
"Apple Juice and Vodka"	2014	—	
"Samurai Bounce" (with Dan Absent)	2014	—	
"Bassline Maniac (Middle Finger Up)" (with Dan Absent)	2014	—	
"Rewind"	2015	—	
"Squats" (with Oh Snap!)	2015	69	
"Everybody Stand Up" (featuring Luciana)	2015	—	
"Gimme That" (with Kate Foxx)	2015	—	
"Ronda Rousley"	2015	—	
"Damn Daniel"	2016	—	
"Stupid Hot" (with Vandalism)	2016	—	
"Ghetto Blaster"	2016	—	
"Sneak Out"	2016	—	
"Move On Up"	2016	—	
"Like You" (featuring Elle Vee)	2017	—	
"Let You Down" (featuring Sunset City)	2017	—	
"Before We Had a Label" (featuring Elle Vee)	2018	—	
"Drive Me Home" (featuring Myah Marie)	2018	—	
"You Gotta Be" (featuring Reigan)	2019	— (Note: "You Gotta Be" did not enter the ARIA Singles Chart, but peaked at number 37 on the ARIA Digital Track Chart.)	
"Okay Okay"	2019	—	
"Big Bad Doof" (featuring Highup)	2020	—	
"Come to Play"	2020	—	
"Carole Baskin"	2020	—	
"You Love" (with RIP Youth featuring Reigan)	2020	—	
"Gravity"	2020	—	
"No Gonna Break"	2020	—	
"Thunder" (with Coby Watts)	2020	—	
"Clouds Above"	2020	—	
"Bad Vibes"	2020	—	
"Love Magic"	2021	—	
"In My Head"	2021	—	
"Don't You Dare"	2021	—	
"Get Shaky"	2021	—	
"Jump On It (My Pony)"	2021	—	
"Goodbye" (with Jaxx Vega)	2021	—	
"Running Up That Hill" (with Reigan)	2022	—	
"Loaded Gun" (with Reigan)	2023	—	
"Drop Da Bomb" (with Luciana)	2023	—	
