= Kronic (DJ) =

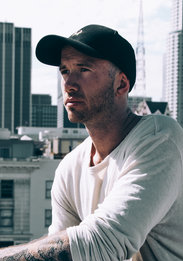

Background information
- Born: Luke Calleja; 3 July 1985 (age 41); Adelaide, South Australia
- Origin: Australia
- Genres: House, hip hop, trap
- Years active: 2010–present
- Labels: Sup Girl Records; Dim Mak Records; Ultra Music; Ministry of Sound Australia
- Website: www.djkronic.com.au

Luke Calleja (born 3 July 1985), professionally known as Kronic, is an Australian DJ, record producer, songwriter and remixer. He is most known for producing and co-writing Lil Jon's "Bend Ova". His remix and production credits includes records for Lady Gaga, Jennifer Lopez, R. Kelly, Austin Mahone, Lil Jon, Pitbull, Enrique Iglesias and Nervo. He released his debut EP Sophisticated Ignorance in 2016. In 2017 his collaboration with Far East Movement and Savage, "Push", was used in the trailer for The Fate of the Furious, which premiered to over 100 million viewers during the 2017 Super Bowl.

== Early life ==
Calleja was born and raised in Adelaide, South Australia

== Music career ==
=== 2013–2015 ===
In July 2013, Kronic was placed the 49th top-ranked National DJ in Australia by In the Mix Awards.

In January 2014, Kronic was hand-picked to remix Lady Gaga's second single "Do What U Want" from her third studio album Artpop (2013).

on 22 July 2014, "Bend Ova" was released as a single by American rapper and producer Lil Jon as the follow-up to his highly successful single "Turn Down for What". The track features a guest verse by American rapper Tyga and was produced by Lil Jon and Australian DJ and producer Kronic.

On 15 July 2015, Kronic released "Beast" alongside Lil Jon featuring Señor Roar.

In November 2015, Kronic was chosen by Ministry of Sound to mix the Annual 2015 alongside Ember and Dom Dolla, which was listed as number 10 on the 2015 ARIA Charts compilation chart. In 2016 he was chosen by Ministry of Sound to mix the Annual 2016 alongside Ember and Dom Dolla again, which was listed as number 17 on the 2016 ARIA Charts compilation chart.

=== 2016–2017 ===
In 2016, he released his latest EP Sophisticated Ignorance, which was featured on sites such as Pilerats and MTV. The first single that came off the EP was "Blood in the Water" featuring Nikki Jean.

In 2016, it was announced that Kronic had been working on material with Justin Bieber.

In July 2016, Kronic released "Bad Bitches" alongside Lil Jon featuring Keno.

In March 2017, Kronic produced "Sexy Body" (with Jennifer Lopez) and "Dedicated" (featuring R. Kelly and Austin Mahone) on Pitbull's tenth studio album Climate Change.

In April 2017, Kronic released "Rendezvous" featuring Leon Thomas III.

== Film and television ==
In 2016, his tracks "Feel That" and "Bad Bitches" were featured in the second season of HBO’s Ballers

In 2017, his 2015 collaboration with Far East Movement and Savage, Push, was used in the trailer for The Fate of the Furious film, which premiered to over 100 million viewers during this past January's Super Bowl.

Kronic's 2016 collaboration with Lil Jon was featured in the 2017 Film Girls Trip

== Sup Girl Records ==
In 2014, Kronic teamed up with Krunk to launch their own record label, Sup Girl Records, which has released music from artists including Far East Movement, JaySounds, Lil Jon, G-Wizard, Spenda C, and others. Sup Girl Record label is a joint venture with the Australia-based EDM label Central Station Records, which is based out of the Australian Ministry of Sound offices.

== Discography ==
=== Artist / Production ===
Year	Role	Artist	Track	Album	Label	Note
2014	Production	Lil Jon feat. Tyga	"Bend Ova"	Bend Ova Single	Columbia	
2015	Artist	Kronic & Lil Jon feat. Senor Roar	"Beast"	Beast Single	Sup Girl	
2015	Artist	Kronic feat. Raven Felix	"Feel That"	Feel That Single	Sup Girl	
2015	Artist	Kronic, Far East Movement & Savage	"Push"	Push Single	Ministry of Sound Australia	
2016	Artist	Kronic	"Sophisticated Ignorance EP"	Sophisticated Ignorance EP	Sup Girl	
2016	Artist	Kronic, Lil Jon & Onderkoffer featuring Keno	"Bad Bitches"	Bad Bitches Single	Sup Girl, Little Jonathon, Inc	
2016	Production	Austin Mahone	"Pretty And Young"	ForMe+You	BMG	
2016	Production	Patty Crash	"Pictures"	Pictures	Sup Girl	
2016	Production	Pitbull & Lil Jon	"La Vida Esa Una"	La Vida Esa Una Single	Mr. 305 Records	
2017	Production	Pitbull feat J-lo	"Sexy Body"	Climate Change	RCA	
2017	Production	Pitbull feat R. Kelly & Austin Mahone	"Dedicated"	Climate Change	RCA	
2017	Artist	Kronic feat Leon Thomas	"Rendezvous"	Rendezvous	Sup Girl	
2017	Production	Patty Crash	"Come Around"	Come Around	Sup Girl	

=== Remixes ===
Year	Artist	Title	Album	Label	Ref
2011	Bombs Away	"Super Soaker (Kronic Remix)"	Super Soaker (Remixes)	Central Station Records	
2014	Havana Brown	"Warrior (Kronic Remix)"	Warrior (Remixes)	Island Records Australia	
2014	Far East Movement feat. Riff Raff	"The Illest (Kronic Remix)"	The Illest (Remixes)	Interscope Records	
2014	Lady Gaga feat. R Kelly	"Do What U Want (Kronic Remix)"	Do What U Want (Remixes)	Interscope Records	
2016	Nervo & Nicky Romero	"Let It Go (Kronic Remix)"	Let It Go (Remixes)	Ultra Records / ToCo Asia	
2016	Fais feat. Afrojack	"Hey (Kronic Remix)"	Hey (Remixes)	Wall Recordings	
2016	Pitbull feat. Enrique Iglesias	"Messin' Around (Kronic & Mike Mayeda Remix)"	non-album single	RCA Records	
