= Attention (Philmont album) =

Studio album by Philmont
- Released: June 24, 2009
- Recorded: Nashville, Tennessee, U.S.
- Genre: Christian punk, pop punk
- Length: 42:08
- Label: Forefront
- Producer: Rob Hawkins

Philmont chronology
Oh Snap (EP) (2008)	Attention (2009)	The Transition EP (2010)

Alternate Japanese cover

Professional ratings
Review scores
Source	Rating
The Tune	C
Jesus Freak Hideout	3/5 stars
Christian Musiczine	C

Attention is the debut full-length album from Christian pop punk band Philmont. It was released in Japan with an alternative cover and track listing on June 24, 2009 and in the U.S. and on iTunes on August 25, 2009. It includes several tracks from their Oh Snap EP, which was also recorded by Rob Hawkins in Nashville, Tennessee.

== Track listing ==
1. "Hello, Jack"
2. "To Say They Hit It Off Would Be an Understatement"
3. "I Can't Stand to Fall"
4. "Another Name"
5. "The Difference"
6. "Back Down"
7. "Setting Off"
8. "Letter to the Editor"
9. "My Hippocratic Oath"
10. "Photosynthetic"
11. "Where to Start"
12. "The Terminal"

=== Japanese track listing ===
1. "Hello, Jack"
2. "I Can't Stand to Fall"
3. "The Difference"
4. "Back Down"
5. "To Say They Hit It Off Would Be an Understatement"
6. "Setting Off"
7. "Letter to the Editor"
8. "My Hippocratic Oath"
9. "Photosynthetic"
10. "Where to Start"
11. "The Terminal"
12. "Another Name"
13. "The Ascension"
