= Beauty and the Geek Australia =

Australian reality television series

- Logo for the first six series
- Created by: Ashton Kutcher
- Presented by: Bernard Curry (2009–12); James Tobin (2013–14); Sophie Monk (2021–)
- Opening theme: "Is She Really Going Out with Him?" by Wes Carr (series 1–3); "Good Time" by Owl City & Carly Rae Jepsen (series 4)
- Country of origin: Australia
- Original language: English
- No. of seasons: 8
- No. of episodes: 73

Production
- Executive producer: Shine Australia - Marty Benson
- Running time: 60 minutes (including commercials)
- Production companies: Endemol Southern Star (2009); Southern Star Group (2010–11); Shine Australia (2012–14, 2021–)

Original release
- Network: Seven Network
- Release: 8 October 2009 – 27 November 2014
- Network: Nine Network
- Release: 11 July 2021 – 3 August 2022

Related
- Beauty and the Geek (franchise)

Beauty and the Geek Australia is an Australian reality television show that follows a group of "Beauties" (women who rely on their attractiveness and outgoing personalities but typically lack intellect) "Geeks" (men who rely on intellect but typically lack the social ability) who must pair up to compete in challenges to survive episodic elimination. The final pair remaining is declared as being "More than a Beauty and a Geek" and wins the grand prize of $100,000.

While a competition, the show is also billed as a social experiment, in which each contestant typically learns from their opposite teammate - both in what trait they lack and in understanding another perspective. During the competition, the contestants live in a mansion, with the beauties competing in challenges of intellect, with the assistance of their "geek", and the geeks competing in challenges regarding social ability, with the assistance of their "beauty".

The series first aired on the Seven Network for six seasons between 2009 and 2014, with Bernard Curry hosting the first four series and James Tobin hosting for the fifth and sixth seasons. On 16 September 2020, the series was revived for a seventh season by Nine Network with Sophie Monk as the new host, and the season premiered on 11 July 2021. On 15 September 2021, the series was renewed for an eighth season with Monk returning as host. No further seasons have been announced.

== Format ==
The format for Beauty and the Geek is as follows:

- Challenges: In each episode, the teams will compete in challenges. The beauties are challenged academic subjects, while the geeks competing in a challenge regarding their social ability, or the challenge can involve the pairs working as a team. The winning Beauty and Geek of their respective challenge win immunity for their team, and in Nine's revival, they also win either a date or a makeover.
- Nominations: Following the challenges, in Seven's version, the winning teams must both name another team to be nominated for Elimination. In Nine's revival, the two bottom-performing teams are nominated for elimination by the Host.
- Eliminations Room: In the elimination room, the nominated teams are tested once again in a quiz regarding the episode's challenges, each other, and the experience overall, alongside physical challenges. The team with the fewer points or correct answers is eliminated from the competition.

The last team remaining wins the competition and wins a cash prize.

== Series overview ==
Series	Presenter	Episodes	Originally released			Winners	Runners-up
Series	Presenter	Episodes	First released	Last released	Network	Winners	Runners-up
1	Bernard Curry	8	8 October 2009	26 November 2009	Seven Network	Emma & Jeremy	Lisa & Corin
2	Bernard Curry	6	21 October 2010	25 November 2010	Seven Network	Jessie & Michael	Tamika & Thomas
3	Bernard Curry	10	22 September 2011	24 November 2011	Seven Network	Sarah & Lachlan	Jordan & Julian
4	Bernard Curry	9	4 October 2012	29 November 2012	Seven Network	Millie & Chard	Alin & Dane
5	James Tobin	8	10 October 2013	28 November 2013	Seven Network	Emily & Brett	Erin & Nathan
6	James Tobin	8	9 October 2014	27 November 2014	Seven Network	Candice & Nick	Nicole & Alexander, Frances & Oliver
7	Sophie Monk	12	11 July 2021	3 August 2021	Nine Network	Keira & Lachlan	Josie & George, Eliza & Alexander
8	Sophie Monk	12	17 July 2022	3 August 2022	Nine Network	Karly & Aaron	Bri & Christopher, Tegan & Anthony

== Season 1 (2009) ==
=== Teams ===
Xenogene later appeared in an audition episode of The X Factor singing "Thriller". He also appeared in the several episodes of the second season of the same series; in a pool when the Geeks were being cabana boys and in crowd scenes at the Beauty Pageant, Bachelor Auction and Wedding Ceremonies.

Team		Status
The Beauty	The Geek	Status
Emma Caminiti, 21 NSW (Miss Congeniality)	Jeremy Reading, 24 ACT (Chess Champion)	Winner
Lisa McMahon, 21 SA (Aspiring Actress)	Corin Storkey, 28 VIC (Synthetic Organic Chemist)	Runner-up
Michelle Smith, 18 QLD (Meter Maid)	Peter Scott, 28 WA (Fungal Scientist)	Eliminated in episode 8
Hadassah Venn, 22 QLD (Spray Tan Technician)	Xenogene Gray, 30 NSW (Physicist)	Eliminated in episode 7
Jenna Griffin, 21 VIC (Air Hostess)	Toby Latcham, 21 QLD (Studying Three Degrees)	Eliminated in episode 6
Elise Griffiths, 20 SA (V8 Grid Girl)	Paul Amores, 24 ACT (Econometrician)	Eliminated in episode 4
Kimberley Ellsmore, 20 NSW (Beauty Queen)	Nathan Carter, 20 VIC (Comic Collector)	Eliminated in episode 3
Kate Winton, 20 SA (Glamour Model)	Alan Kwong, 19 WA (Child Genius)	Eliminated in episode 2

=== Episode progress ===
#	Contestants	Episodes								
#	Contestants	1	2	3	4	5	6	7	8	
1	Emma	WIN	SAFE	SAFE	WIN	SAFE	RISK	RISK	RISK	WINNER
1	Jeremy	SAFE	SAFE	SAFE	WIN	SAFE	RISK	RISK	RISK	WINNER
2	Lisa	SAFE	SAFE	SAFE	SAFE	WIN	SAFE	SAFE	WIN	RUNNER-UP
2	Corin	WIN	WIN	SAFE	SAFE	WIN	SAFE	WIN	WIN	RUNNER-UP
3	Michelle	SAFE	WIN	SAFE	SAFE	SAFE	WIN	WIN	OUT	
3	Peter	SAFE	SAFE	SAFE	SAFE	SAFE	WIN	SAFE	OUT	
4	Hadassah	SAFE	SAFE	SAFE	SAFE	SAFE	SAFE	OUT		
4	Xenogene	SAFE	SAFE	WIN	SAFE	SAFE	SAFE	OUT		
5	Jenna	SAFE	RISK	WIN	RISK	SAFE	OUT			
5	Toby	SAFE	RISK	SAFE	RISK	SAFE	OUT			
6	Elise	SAFE	SAFE	RISK	OUT					
6	Paul	SAFE	SAFE	RISK	OUT					
7	Kimberley	SAFE	SAFE	OUT						
7	Nathan	SAFE	SAFE	OUT						
8	Kate	SAFE	OUT							
8	Alan	SAFE	OUT							

The contestants won the competition.
The contestants claimed the runner-up position in the competition.
The contestant won the challenge and their pair was safe from elimination.
The contestant's partner won the challenge and they were safe from elimination.
The contestant did not win the challenge and neither were they nominated but their pair was safe from elimination.
The contestant and their partner were nominated and survived elimination.
The contestant and their partner were nominated and were eliminated from the competition.
The contestants did not compete in the week.

=== Challenges and eliminations ===
Episode 1: 8 October 2009
The beauties met the geeks for the first time, and are put into teams. The beauties had to teach a 5th grade class either science, mathematics, history or geography. The geeks had to perform a rap song for a nightclub audience including guest judges Molly Meldrum and Jessica Mauboy. There was no elimination, much to the surprise of the contestants.

Episode 2: 15 October 2009
The beauties studied the anatomy of the body. Meanwhile, the geeks practised relaxing massage techniques, including developing their own signature move, which they put into practice on the beauties.

Episode 3: 22 October 2009
For many of the geeks, it was their first opportunity to go on a date when they embarked on speed dating. The beauties became rocket scientists when they attempted to build and launch a rocket from scratch.

Episode 4: 29 October 2009
The geeks are create a race day outfit for their beauties, including choosing a dress for dumaaaa and making the fascinator from scratch, to impress guest judges, milliner Pater Jago and Kate Waterhouse (daughter of horse trainer Gai Waterhouse). Meanwhile, the beauties brushed up on their current affairs knowledge to present a speech on a newsworthy topic.

Episode 5: 5 November 2009
The boys got a makeover in the hopes of improving their confidence. This week also contained the first team challenge, with the beauties and geeks teaming up for a special soap opera challenge with the help of Home and Away stars Ada Nicodemou and Luke Jacobz.

Episode 6: 12 November 2009
The Beauties become tour guides for a night at the museum, and the Geeks host a radio Love Hotline.

Episode 7: 19 November 2009
The Geeks teach a fitness class while the Beauties build a billy cart from scratch.

Episode 8 (Finale): 26 November 2009
The teams pair up for their own Amazing Race-inspired challenge. They receive clues and work together to track down three eliminated contestants scattered throughout Sydney - the last team back at the mansion would be instantly eliminated. Then the final elimination room quiz was held for the $100,000 prize.

Week	Beauty challenge (winner)	Geek challenge (winner)	Elimination room	Eliminated
1	Primary School Knowledge (Emma)	Rap Competition (Corin)	None	
2	Human Anatomy (Michelle)	Massaging (Corin)	Jenna and Toby; Kate and Alan	Kate and Alan
3	Rocket Scientist (Jenna)	Speed Dating (Xenogene)	Elise and Paul; Kimberley and Nathan	Kimberley and Nathan
4	Current Affairs Knowledge (Emma)	Create A Dress From Scratch (Jeremy)	Jenna and Toby; Elise and Paul	Elise and Paul
5	Soap Opera (Corin/Lisa)		None	
6	Tour Guide (Michelle)	Radio Love Hotline (Peter)	Emma and Jeremy; Jenna and Toby	Jenna and Toby
7	Building a Go Kart (Michelle)	Teaching Fitness Class (Corin)	Hadassah and Xenogene; Emma and Jeremy	Hadassah and Xenogene
8	Race To The Finale (Corin/Lisa)		Emma and Jeremy; Michelle and Peter	Michelle and Peter
Winners	Emma and Jeremy			

=== Ratings ===
No.	Title	Air date	Overnight ratings		Ref(s)
No.	Title	Air date	Viewers	Rank	Ref(s)
1	Episode 1	8 October 2009	1,056,000	7	
2	Episode 2	15 October 2009	1,067,000	6	
3	Episode 3	22 October 2009	952,000	10	
4	Episode 4	29 October 2009	1,000,000	7	
5	Episode 5	5 November 2009	1,211,000	3	
6	Episode 6	12 November 2009	1,008,000	8	
7	Episode 7	19 November 2009	993,000	8	
8	Episode 8	26 November 2009	1,038,000	5	

== Season 2 (2010) ==
The second season began recording on 9 August 2010, with the first episode going to air on 21 October 2010. There were six episodes in total. The first and last ones were one and a half hours instead of just one hour.

The season was won by the pairing of Michael and Jessie.

=== Teams ===
The second season of Beauty and the Geek Australia features the same contestant structure as the first season, with one big twist; one of the "Beauties" (Ellie) is actually a twin (Brooke; who also competes). In each challenge only one of the twins was allowed to compete and only that twin can study for that challenge. Also, Xenogene from season 1 was a background "Where's Wally" in at least six episodes. The contestants for the second season were as follows.

Team		Status
The Beauties	The Geek	Status
Jessie Byrne, 21 NSW (Dancer)	Michael Price, 23 QLD (National Maths Champion)	Winner
Tamika Chesser, 20 QLD (Cocktail Waitress)	Thomas Richardson-Smith, 22 VIC (Hawaiian Shirt Enthusiast)	Runner-up
Ellynie-May Rasborsek, 20 NSW (Nail Technician)	Marlon Dance-Hooi, 25 SA (Completing Double Degree)	Second eliminated in episode 6
Donna Thompson, 22 NSW (Hairdresser)	Daniel Iachini, 23 SA (Molecular Biologist)	First eliminated in episode 6
Kara Palmieri, 20 NSW (Personal Shopper)	Tim Young, 23 WA (Astrophysicist)	Eliminated in episode 5
Brooke Kelaart, 18 QLD (Ice-Cream Scooper) (Note: Brooke and Ellie Kelaart are identical twins. However, they are competed individually in one weekly challenge.)	George Sinapius, 22 QLD (Dinosaur Fossil Expert)	Eliminated in episode 3
Ellie Kelaart, 18 QLD (Menswear Consultant)	George Sinapius, 22 QLD (Dinosaur Fossil Expert)	Eliminated in episode 3
Linette Goder, 20 WA (Promo Model)	David Bathie, 19 VIC (Rover Scout)	Eliminated in episode 2
Nicola Cross, 21 SA (Nanny)	Stuart Sandow, 31 SA (Comic Collector)	Eliminated in episode 1

Winners are in bold

=== Episode progress ===
#	Contestants	Episodes							
#	Contestants	1	2	3	4	5	6		
1	**Jessie**	SAFE	SAFE	**SAFE ⋑**	SAFE	**WIN ⊃**	SAFE	RISK	**WINNER**
1	**Michael**	SAFE	SAFE	**WIN ⋑**	SAFE	**SAFE ⊃**	SAFE	RISK	**WINNER**
2	Tamika	SAFE	**WIN ⊃**	SAFE	SAFE	SAFE	**WIN**	WIN	**RUNNER-UP**
2	Thomas	SAFE	**SAFE ⊃**	SAFE	SAFE	SAFE	**WIN**	WIN	**RUNNER-UP**
3	Ellynie-May	**RISK ⊂**	**SAFE ⋑**	SAFE	SAFE	**SAFE ⋑**	**RISK**	OUT	
3	Marlon	**RISK ⊂**	**WIN ⋑**	SAFE	SAFE	**WIN ⋑**	**RISK**	OUT	
4	Donna	**SAFE ⊃**	**RISK ⋐**	**RISK ⊂**	SAFE	**RISK ⋐**	**OUT**		
4	Daniel	**WIN ⊃**	**RISK ⋐**	**RISK ⊂**	SAFE	**RISK ⋐**	**OUT**		
5	Kara	SAFE	**WIN**	**WIN ⊃**	SAFE	**OUT ⊂**			
5	Tim	SAFE	**SAFE**	**SAFE ⊃**	SAFE	**OUT ⊂**			
6	Brooke & Ellie	**WIN ⋑**	SAFE	**OUT ⋐**					
6	George	**SAFE ⋑**	SAFE	**OUT ⋐**					
7	Linette	SAFE	**OUT ⊂**						
7	David	SAFE	**OUT ⊂**						
8	Nicola	**OUT ⋐**							
8	Stuart	**OUT ⋐**							

The contestant won the competition.
The contestants claimed the runner-up position in the competition.
The contestant won the challenge and their pair was safe from elimination.
The contestant's partner won the challenge and they were safe from elimination.
The contestant won immunity and was safe from elimination.
The contestant's partner won immunity and they were safe from elimination.
The contestant did not win the challenge or immunity and neither were they nominated but they were safe from elimination.
The contestant and their partner survived elimination.
The contestant was eliminated from the competition.
The contestant did not compete in the week.

A ⊃ or a ⋑ indicates that the winning team had the power to nominate a non winning / non immune team for elimination; a ⊂ or ⋐ indicates the team who received it.

=== Challenges and eliminations ===
Episode 1: 21 October 2010
The Geeks apply their knowledge of beauty and fashion to design and dress their Beauties in a handmade bikini which best reflects who the Geeks are for a pageant before a panel of former beauty pageant winners, Miss Universe Australia 2009 Rachael Finch, Miss World 1972 Belinda Green and Miss Australia 1954 Shirley Bliss. The Beauties build a flying device for their Geeks to fly.

Episode 2: 28 October 2010
The Beauties have to handle creepy-crawlies in a challenge that incorporates mathematics, while the Geeks have to stand in as Cabana Boys at a famous Star City hotel. In the creepy-crawlies challenge, the beauties had to transport bugs of different values to their own bowl and whoever scored 100 points worth of bugs won the challenge. Later, a second challenge was announced where beauties can gain immunity by eating a live witchetty grub. However, this winner is unable to nominate a pair for elimination.

Episode 3: 4 November 2010
The beauties have to take a Legally Blonde style challenge that involves law with Barbara Holborow as the preside judge, while the Geeks have to pose nude for a calendar in Who magazine. In the Legally Blonde showcase challenge, the beauties were given a topic and were announced if they were for or against. Between the two beauties, the judge would declare a winner. Then out of the three, there was a final winner. Later, Kara's feelings about Daniel kissing Ellie finally came out.

Episode 4: 11 November 2010
The Geek make-over special involved style, fashion, hair and personality. The geeks changed from geek to chic as they transformed very differently. The beauties had to auction off their geek and in due with the auction, the got a date. The beauties were given tasks to set the geeks to do, if not so, they would be eliminated. No one got eliminated that week.

Episode 5: 18 November 2010
The Beauties get down and dirty as they learn about history, where the Geeks have to form a boy band with Justice Crew in a local place. In the archeological dig challenge, the Beauties had to get dirty in a mud pool with items inside and needed to put them in year order. The Geeks were introduced to Justice Crew and were taught dance moves to perform to a live audience. The winner was declared by Justice Crew who they felt put a lot of energy into it.

Episode 6: 25 November 2010
The beauties had to do a spelling bee and the geeks were to declare their Cinderella with a shoe fitting, finding the correct sized shoe for their beauty among a pile of other shoes. Then the race was on with the geeks carrying their beauties in chariots to the finish line, in which Daniel and Donna were eliminated. A surprise came which no one expected, a challenge in which the beauties were a beautiful bride to their groomy geeks. The audience at the wedding voted for the best vow, dance and speech, where Marlon and Ellynie-May were eliminated. Michael and Jessie won the second season of Beauty and the Geek Australia, beating Thomas and Tamika with a score of 3-2 in the elimination room.

Week	Beauty challenge (winner)	Geek challenge (winner)	Elimination room	Eliminated
1	Build a Flying Device (Twins)	Making a Bikini (Daniel)	Ellynie-May and Marlon; Nicola and Stuart	Nicola and Stuart
2	Creepy Crawling (Tamika)	Cabana Boys (Marlon)	Linette and David; Donna and Daniel	Linette and David
3	Courtroom (Kara)	Pose Nude (Michael)	Donna and Daniel; Twins and George	Twins and George
4	None			
5	Archaeology (Jessie)	Dance Perform in a Live Audience (Marlon)	Donna and Daniel; Kara and Tim	Kara and Tim
6	Race to the Finish (Tamika and Thomas)		Jessie and Michael; Tamika and Thomas	Donna and Daniel; Ellynie-May and Marlon
6	Wedding (Tamika and Thomas)		Jessie and Michael; Tamika and Thomas	Donna and Daniel; Ellynie-May and Marlon
Winners	Jessie and Michael			

=== Ratings ===
No.	Title	Air date	Overnight ratings		Ref(s)
No.	Title	Air date	Viewers	Rank	Ref(s)
1	Episode 1	21 October 2010	969,000	5	
2	Episode 2	28 October 2010	971,000	6	
3	Episode 3	4 November 2010	931,000	7	
4	Episode 4	11 November 2010	1,429,000	1	
5	Episode 5	18 November 2010	1,067,000	4	
6	Episode 6	25 November 2010	1,100,000	4	
6	Winner Announced	25 November 2010	1,224,000	3	

== Season 3 (2011) ==
The third season began airing on 22 September 2011, with the first episode being 90 minutes.

=== Teams ===
The third season of Beauty and the Geek Australia features the same contestant structure as the first season, with one big twist; one of the "Beauties" is a male and one of the geeks is a female.

Team		Status
The Beauties	The Geeks	Status
Sarah Lawther, 20 NSW (Promo Model)	Lachlan Cosgrove, 22 QLD (Studying Constitutional Law)	Winner
Jordan Finlayson, 20 NSW (Dancer)	Julian Stevenson, 25 NSW (PhD Molecular Genetics)	Runner-up
Maddy Fowler, 20 NSW (Cheerleader)	Gilbert Moffatt, 19 VIC (Studying Double Degree)	Quit in Episode 6 (Maddy)
Jacelle Kop, 20 VIC (Trainee Barmaid)	Gilbert Moffatt, 19 VIC (Studying Double Degree)	Second eliminated in episode 10
Mackenzie Gogo Smits, 21 WA (Covergirl)	Jimmy Reilly, 26 NSW (I.T. Support Technician)	First eliminated in episode 10
Troy Thompson, 21 NSW (Topless Waiter)	Helen Arnold, 26 ACT (Statistician)	Eliminated in episode 9
Ashley "Dolly" Knight, 20 QLD (Cosmetic Tattooist)	Bendeguz Daniel Devenyi-Botos, 21 NSW (Historian)	Eliminated in episode 7
Troy Thompson (returned to competition)	Helen Arnold (returned to competition)	Eliminated in episode 6
Jacelle Kop (returned to competition)	Theo Bendit, 23 NSW (Mathematician)	Eliminated in episode 4
Emma Ceolin, 21 QLD (Receptionist/Miss FHM)	Adam Marshall, 25 VIC (Remote Area Meteorologist)	Eliminated in episode 3
Gaia Booker, 19 WA (Part-Time Nanny)	Colin Hockings, 23 VIC (Cambridge Scientist)	Eliminated in episode 2
Darlene Grace Cook, 21 NT (Casino Hostess)	Nathan Sinclair, 19 SA (Video Game and Cosplay Addict who has Never Been Kissed)	Eliminated in episode 1

=== Episode progress ===
#	Contestants	Episodes													
#	Contestants	1	2	3	4	5		6		7 (Note: In episode 7, the winners of the challenges did not take part in nominating two teams for elimination after Lachlan & Sarah were immune from elimination. Remaining teams Jordan & Julian and Dolly & Bendeguz, were automatically nominated.)	8	9	10		
1	Sarah	SAFE ⋑	SAFE	SAFE	WIN ⋑	WIN	RISK	SAFE		SAFE	SAFE	RISK ⊂	RISK	RISK	WINNER
1	Lachlan	WIN ⋑	SAFE	SAFE	WIN ⋑	WIN		SAFE		WIN	SAFE	RISK ⊂	RISK	RISK	WINNER
2	Jordan	WIN ⊃	SAFE ⋑	SAFE	WIN ⊃	RISK		WIN ⊃		RISK ∪	SAFE	WIN ⋑	WIN	WIN	RUNNER-UP
2	Julian	SAFE ⊃	WIN ⋑	SAFE	SAFE ⊃	SAFE		SAFE ⊃		RISK ∪	SAFE	SAFE ⋑	WIN	WIN	RUNNER-UP
3	Jacelle (Note: In episode 6, Maddy quit the competition due to health reasons, Jacelle (from the team "Jacelle & Theo") returned to be Gilbert's new team partner, ending the teams of both "Jacelle & Theo" and "Maddy & Gilbert" and beginning the new team of "Jacelle & Gilbert".)	SAFE	WIN ⊃	SAFE	OUT ⋐			IN	SAFE ⋑	SAFE ~~⋑~~	WIN ⊃	SAFE	SAFE	OUT	
3	Gilbert	SAFE	SAFE	SAFE	SAFE	SAFE		WIN ⋑		WIN ~~⋑~~	SAFE ⊃	SAFE	SAFE	OUT	
4	Mackenzie	SAFE	SAFE	RISK ⋐	SAFE	RISK		RISK ⋐		WIN ~~⊃~~	SAFE ⋑	SAFE ⊃	OUT		
4	Jimmy	SAFE	SAFE	RISK ⋐	SAFE	SAFE		RISK ⋐		SAFE ~~⊃~~	WIN ⋑	WIN ⊃	OUT		
5	Troy	SEEN	WIN	WIN ⊃	SAFE	RISK		OUT ⊂			IN ⋐ (Note: In episode 8, Mackenzie & Jimmy, and Jacelle & Gilbert had to nominate two teams to return to the competition instead of the usual nominating two teams to go home. Due to Maddy's "sudden departure from the mansion" Theo was ineligible for this nomination Jacelle & Gilbert nominated Gaia & Colin, while Mackenzie & Jimmy nominated Troy & Helen. In the end, Troy & Helen won the elimination room quiz and returned to the competition thus eliminating Gaia & Colin.)	OUT ⋐			
5	Helen	SEEN	SAFE	WIN ⊃	SAFE	SAFE		OUT ⊂			IN ⋐	OUT ⋐			
6	Dolly	SAFE	RISK ⊂	SAFE ⋑	RISK ⊂	RISK		SAFE		OUT ∪	OUT				
6	Bendeguz	SAFE	RISK ⊂	WIN ⋑	RISK ⊂	SAFE		SAFE		OUT ∪	OUT				
7 Individual	Maddy	SAFE	SAFE	SAFE	SAFE	RISK		QUIT							
7 Team	Theo	SAFE	SAFE ⊃	SAFE	OUT ⋐						OUT				
8	Emma	SAFE	SAFE	OUT ⊂							OUT				
8	Adam	SAFE	SAFE	OUT ⊂							OUT				
9	Gaia	RISK ⋐	OUT ⋐								OUT ⊂				
9	Colin	RISK ⋐	OUT ⋐								OUT ⊂				
10	Darlene	OUT ⊂									OUT				
10	Nathan	OUT ⊂									OUT				

The contestant won the competition.
The contestants claimed the runner-up position in the competition.
The contestant won the challenge and was safe from elimination.
The contestant's partner won the challenge and they were safe from elimination.
The contestant won immunity and was safe from elimination.
The contestant's partner won immunity and they were safe from elimination.
The contestant did not win the challenge or immunity and neither were they nominated but they were safe from elimination.
The contestant and their partner survived elimination.
The contestant was eliminated from the competition.
The contestant did not compete in the week.
The team was seen as a replacement for the first eliminated team but did not compete in the week.
The contestant was individually nominated for elimination and survived.
The contestant quit the competition.
The contestant was reentered as a replacement due to the withdrawal of another contestant.
The contestant was nominated and returned to the competition.
The contestant was nominated but did not return to the competition.
The contestant was eligible to return to the competition but was not nominated.
The contestant's partner was eligible to return to the competition but was not nominated.
The contestant was ineligible to return to the competition and therefore could not be nominated.

A ⊃ or a ⋑ indicates that the winning team had the power to nominate a non winning / non immune team for elimination; a ⊂ or ⋐ indicates the team who received it and faced elimination. A ~~⊃~~ or ~~⋑~~ indicates that the winning team was initially eligible to nominate a non winning / non immune team for elimination however did not. A ∪ indicates that the team was automatically nominated for elimination. A blue ⊃ or a blue ⋑ indicates that the winning team had the power to nominate a previously eliminated team to return to the competition; a ⊂ or ⋐ indicates the team who received it.

Notes

In the grand finale, Troy & Mackenzie announced their engagement. Their teammates bonded and Jimmy asked Helen out on a date, but Helen informed Jimmy that she was already taken by a guy in the Netherlands. Lachlan and Jordan started dating beyond the game. It was unclear what happened to Gilbert and Dolly.

=== Challenges and eliminations ===
Episode 1: 22 September 2011
The geeks applied their knowledge in a "Fashion-atomy" challenge, which involved painting on their beauties specific items of clothing and being judged by Camilla Franks. The beauties then did a "Round-the-World" challenge by matching selected foods to the country that they are associated with on a large map of the world. Helen and Troy were first introduced.

Episode 2: 29 September 2011
The beauties took part in a zoology challenge, in which they put their hand into five crates with an animal inside, feeling it, and then naming each animal. The beauties were then offered immunity in a challenge where a disk was placed in a crate with 50 000 cockroaches inside, and the beauties had to pick up the disk with their mouth. The geeks took part in a "What's Your Number?" challenge, which had them approaching a female (a male for Helen) and asking for their number by flirting and finding interests.

Episode 3: 6 October 2011
The beauties and the geeks take part in a hero challenge where they each had to shoot a ball of paint at pictures of geek and beauty heroes respectively, and then name the hero. The geeks later took part in a roller-skating derby challenge in which a Sydney women's roller-derby team would try to knock them over. The last two geeks standing would then have to protect their beauties from falling over.

Episode 4: 13 October 2011
The beauties and geeks return to school as the beauties are assigned to teach a Year 7 class about either physics, chemistry, biology or volcanology. Afterwards the geeks paired up with their beauty to choreograph and perform a cheerleading routine, with the top two couples having to compete with a professional cheerleading team.

Episode 5: 20 October 2011
The beauties and geeks posed in a photoshoot which saw many of them strip down into underwear. The couple with the best photo would appear on the cover of the Famous magazine, and the geek of this couple as well as the couple that came second in the challenge would receive a makeover. After Lachlan and Helen's makeover, each of the geeks went out on a date with a female geek (male for Helen) specifically chosen to match their interests, with the beauties having to serve them as waitresses. Afterwards they were given a choice; they had the chance to swap their beauty for their geeky date. After a lot of controversy, none of the geeks turned in their beauty for their date. As a treat there was no elimination for that week.

Episode 6: 27 October 2011
The beauties designed a comic book superhero, and the geeks then had to design and make a costume for this superhero which the beauties would have to wear on a fashion parade. The geeks introduced their partner as they came out, and the beauties then had to describe the powers that their superhero had. Following this challenge the remaining four geeks who didn't have makeovers the previous week had their turn, with some amazing results. Using their new look they participated in a "Full Monty Challenge", involving each of them to perform a short dance dressed as The Village People at a local club with a big finale involving them stripping down to their underwear.

Episode 7: 3 November 2011
The beauties took on a spelling bee based on their respective geek's interest. Each time they misspelled a word their geek would receive an electric shock, and if they got the same word wrong twice in a row they would be knocked out of the challenge. The geeks then took part in a biker race, which had the beauties construct a bike and sidecar for their geeks to ride in, with the first beauty to finish giving their geek an advantage in the race. The geeks were to carry members of the HOGS motorcycle gang in the sidecar, with the geek whose partner finished building the bike first having the advantage of carrying the lightest biker, and the heaviest biker riding in the bike of the geek whose partner finished last. After the race the geeks were offered immunity; the first geek to step forward to have their beauty's name tattooed on their body would go through to next week. Lachlan took the challenge much to everyone's surprise, getting Sarah's name tattooed on his buttocks and consequently causing much drama in the house.

Episode 8: 10 November 2011
The beauties undertook a "Mustering Maths" challenge, which involved them attempting to round up a group of farm animals each with a number or mathematical symbol on them into a small enclosure to make an equation that would equal 60. Later the previously eliminated geeks who did not have the chance to get makeovers re-entered the house, with each of the geeks still in the competition giving them makeovers with a time limit of two hours. The beauties then voted on which made over geek had the biggest improvement, unaware as to who made over which geek. However, a twist was introduced so that the two winning couples of the week (Gilbert and Jacelle in the Mustering Maths challenge, and Jimmy and Mackenzie in the style challenge) had the power to nominate a couple to return to the mansion, instead of nominating a couple to be eliminated.

Episode 9: 17 November 2011
The geeks were brought into an art studio for a "Woman Appreciation" challenge, in which they had 20 minutes to sketch a naked female model. While they were sketching her, the model kept talking casually about mundane things in her life much to their annoyance, and was generally being very distracting. However, at the end of the challenge they were told that they were not being assessed on how good their artwork is, but how much they listened, and so they were quizzed on things the model said. Afterwards the beauties had to work with their geek to find a figure or icon that represents the "London Look", which the beauty then had to dress up as and represent in a beauty pageant.

Episode 10: 24 November 2011
The geeks and beauties returned to school as they were graded on school subjects such as Science, Home Economics and Physical Education. The couple with the lowest average grade was eliminated, and the remaining three couples would attend the school formal. At the school formal the geeks would stand in a kissing booth and the beauties had to advertise their geeks to other people attending the formal. The couples then participated in a dance battle, and following these two challenges all the attendees had to vote on which couple had the strongest bond. The top two couples from this challenge then went to the elimination room for the final time where the scores were so tight that two tie-breaker rounds were held. The result was a score of 5-4 with Lachlan and Sarah winning Season 3 of Beauty and the Geek Australia over Julian and Jordan.

Week	Beauty challenge (winner)	Geek challenge (winner)	Elimination room	Eliminated
1	Food Round the World (Jordan)	Fashion Anatomy (Lachlan)	Darlene and Nathan; Gaia and Colin	Darlene and Nathan
2	Zoology (Jacelle)	What's Your Number (Julian)	Gaia and Colin; Dolly and Bendeguz	Gaia and Colin
3	—N/a	Roller Derby (Bendeguz)	Emma and Adam; Mackenzie and Jimmy	Emma and Adam
3	Shooting Stars (Troy and Helen)		Emma and Adam; Mackenzie and Jimmy	Emma and Adam
4	Science Fair (Jordan)	—N/a	Jacelle and Theo; Dolly and Bendeguz	Jacelle and Theo
4	Cheerleading (Sarah and Lachlan)		Jacelle and Theo; Dolly and Bendeguz	Jacelle and Theo
5	Couples Photography (Sarah and Lachlan)		None	
6	Superhero (Jordan)	Full Monty (Gilbert)	Troy and Helen; Mackenzie and Jimmy	Troy and Helen
7	Spelling Bee (Mackenzie)	Motorbike Race (Gilbert)	Jordan and Julian; Dolly and Bendeguz	Dolly and Bendeguz
8	Mustering Maths (Jacelle)	Style (Jimmy)	None	
9	London Fashion Icon (Jordan)	Woman Appreciation (Jimmy)	Troy and Helen; Sarah and Lachlan	Troy and Helen
10	Back to School (Jordan and Julian)		Sarah and Lachlan; Mackenzie and Jimmy	Mackenzie and Jimmy
10	School Dance (Jordan and Julian)		Sarah and Lachlan; Jacelle and Gilbert	Jacelle and Gilbert
Winners	Sarah and Lachlan			

=== Ratings ===
No.	Title	Air date	Timeslot	Overnight ratings		Weekly rank	Ref(s)
No.	Title	Air date	Timeslot	Viewers	Rank	Weekly rank	Ref(s)
1	Episode 1	22 September 2011	Thursday 8:30 pm	0.927	4	29	
2	Episode 2	29 September 2011	Thursday 8:30pm	0.804	9	42	
3	Episode 3	6 October 2011	Thursday 8:30pm	0.863	9	36	
4	Episode 4	13 October 2011	Thursday 8:30pm	0.995	4	26	
5	Episode 5	20 October 2011	Thursday 8:30pm	1.371	1	9	
6	Episode 6	27 October 2011	Thursday 7:30pm	1.330	1	7	
7	Episode 7	3 November 2011	Thursday 7:30pm	1.143	1	18	
8	Episode 8	10 November 2011	Thursday 7:30pm	1.119	2	–	
9	Episode 9	17 November 2011	Thursday 7:30pm	1.020	2	–	
10	Episode 10	24 November 2011	Thursday 7:30pm	1.075	3	–	
10	Winner Announced	24 November 2011	Thursday 7:30pm	1.253	1	–	

== Season 4 (2012) ==
The fourth season began airing on 4 October 2012. This season saw some changes, including the theme song. In addition to winning the regular prize, the winner will receive two Holden Barina per one for each winning team member. Also, the nominations and eliminations room were expanded into a bigger size. This season's big twist was that one of the geeks is a secret millionaire, and in week 3 this was revealed to be Nathan. It was also Bernard Curry's last series as a host.

=== Teams ===
Team		Status
The Beauties	The Geeks	Status
Amelia "Millie'" Lincoln, 18 VIC (Professional Bra Fitter)	Richard "Chard" Oldfield, 22 NSW (Bionic Limb Expert)	Winner
Alin Ling Ling, 19 NSW (High Heel Collector)	Dane Gade, 19 VIC (Health Science Student)	Runner-up
Chontelle Berryman, 18 VIC (Trainee Make Up Artist)	Cody Davies, 19 SA (Webmaster who has Never Been Kissed)	Second eliminated in episode 9
Kristy Clinch, 23 QLD (Window Dresser)	Jason Newell, 23 QLD (Town Planner)	First eliminated in episode 9
Kim Muhovics, 21 SA (Fake Tanner)	Richard "Rich" Bell, 24 VIC (Aerospace Engineer)	Eliminated in episode 8
Nikki Marks, 23 NSW (Nanny)	Jack Ferguson, 23 VIC (Experimentalist)	Eliminated in episode 7
Greta Guy, 22 VIC (Cocktail Waitress/Hair Removalist/Beauty Therapist)	Yiran Tan, 19 SA (Boy Genius/Medical Student)	Eliminated in episode 6
Jessica Zinna, 24 VIC (Stewardess)	Nathan Hoad, 25 QLD (Programmer/IT Millionaire)	Eliminated in episode 4
Bre Gorman, 18 NSW (Barbie Enthusiast/Babysitter)	Oliver Mitchell, 22 NSW (Lawyer)	Eliminated in episode 3
Courtney Sander, 19 WA (Receptionist)	Matthew "Matt" Hall, 18 NSW (Psychologist/Insect Collector)	Eliminated in episode 2
Nikki Marks (returned to competition)	Jack Ferguson (returned to competition)	Eliminated in episode 1

=== Episode progress ===
#	Contestants	Episodes											
#	Contestants	1	2	3 (Note: In Week 3, Greta & Yiran and Alin & Dane won the challenge together, and therefore they all had to select one team to send to the elimination room.)	4 (Note: In Week 4 the elimination was chosen by a vote, not a quiz. Each individual contestant voted for one of the two nominated teams.)	5 (Note: In Week 5 the winning couples had the opportunity to choose whether to send someone home or not. If one couple decided to send someone home but the other didn't, the nominated couple would automatically be eliminated. Neither couple wanted to eliminate anyone, so everyone was safe.)	6	7		8	9		
1	Millie	SAFE	SAFE	SAFE	SAFE	SAFE	SAFE	SAFE	SAFE	SAFE	SAFE	RISK	WINNER
1	Chard	SAFE	SAFE	SAFE	WIN	SAFE	SAFE	SAFE	SAFE	SAFE	SAFE	RISK	WINNER
2	Alin	SAFE	SAFE	SAFE	WIN	SAFE	SAFE	SAFE	SAFE	SAFE	WIN	WIN	RUNNER-UP
2	Dane	SAFE	WIN	WIN	SAFE	WIN	SAFE	SAFE	WIN	WIN	WIN	WIN	RUNNER-UP
3	Chontelle	SAFE	SAFE	SAFE	SAFE	WIN	SAFE	SAFE	WIN	RISK	RISK	OUT	
3	Cody	SAFE	SAFE	SAFE	SAFE	WIN	WIN	SAFE	SAFE	RISK	RISK	OUT	
4	Kristy	WIN	RISK	SAFE (Note: Also in Week 3, Jason had the opportunity to receive immunity by getting a nipple piercing, he accepted it and therefore along with Kristy, was safe from elimination. They did not, however have the power to send a team to the elimination room.)	RISK	SAFE	RISK	SAFE	RISK	WIN	OUT		
4	Jason	SAFE	RISK	WIN	RISK	SAFE	RISK	WIN	RISK	SAFE	OUT		
5	Kim	SAFE	SAFE	SAFE	SAFE	SAFE	WIN	WIN	SAFE	OUT			
5	Rich	SAFE	SAFE	WIN	SAFE	SAFE	SAFE	SAFE	SAFE	OUT			
6	Nikki	OUT						IN (Note: In the first half of episode 7, Kim & Rich, and Kristy & Jason had to nominate two teams to return to the competition instead of the usual nominating two teams to go home. Kim & Rich nominated Nikki & Jack, while Kristy & Jason nominated Jessica & Nathan. In the end, Nikki & Jack won the elimination room quiz and returned to the competition.)	OUT				
6	Jack	OUT						IN	OUT				
7	Greta	RISK	SAFE	WIN	SAFE	SAFE	OUT						
7	Yiran	RISK (Note: Yiran entered to the competition on the night of day one as he was taking exams earlier in the day.)	SAFE	WIN	SAFE	SAFE	OUT						
8	Jessica	SAFE	SAFE	RISK	OUT			OUT					
8	Nathan	WIN	SAFE	RISK	OUT			OUT					
9	Bre	SAFE	WIN	OUT									
9	Oliver	SAFE	SAFE	OUT									
10	Courtney	SAFE	OUT										
10	Matt	SAFE	OUT										

The contestants won the competition.
The contestants claimed the runner-up position in the competition.
The contestant won the challenge and their pair was safe from elimination.
The contestant's partner won the challenge and they were safe from elimination.
The contestant did not win the challenge but their pair was safe from elimination.
The contestant and their partner survived elimination.
The contestant and their partner was eliminated.
The contestants did not compete in the week.
The contestants were brought back into the competition.
The contestants were nominated but did not return to the competition.
The contestant won immunity and was safe from elimination.
The contestant's partner won immunity and they were safe from elimination.

Notes

In the grand final of Beauty and the Geek Australia season 4, it involved both the beauties and the geeks to dress as if they are medieval times. Their challenges included the geeks' ability to save their princesses by climbing a rock climbing wall and the beauties having to recite a sonnet and kiss a frog. Kristy and Jason were eliminated after this. The next lot of couples then attended a ball in which the couples had to tell the audience about their time in the mansion together while also dancing in a ballet together. Chontelle and Cody were eliminated in this challenge which then left Millie and Chard versus Dane and Alin to compete for the prize.

In the final round of Beauty and the Geek, the couples went up against each other in a quiz to see which couple knew the most about each other. Amid some controversy over the easiness of questions put to Chard & Millie, compared to Alin's & Dane's quiz questions, Chard & Millie were crowned the winners of Beauty and the Geek 2012.

=== Challenges and eliminations ===
Week	Beauty challenge (winner)	Geek challenge (winner)	Elimination room	Eliminated
1	Body Sense (Kristy)	Double Eye (Nathan)	Nikki and Jack; Greta and Yiran	Nikki and Jack
2	Spelling Bee (Bre)	Fashion Photography (Dane)	Courtney and Matt; Kristy and Jason	Courtney and Matt
3	—N/a	Hard Guy (Rich)	Jessica and Nathan; Bre and Oliver	Bre and Oliver
3	Longest Hug (Alin and Dane/Greta and Yiran)		Jessica and Nathan; Bre and Oliver	Bre and Oliver
4	Etiquette Class (Alin)	Wrestling (Chard)	Kristy and Jason; Jessica and Nathan	Jessica and Nathan
5	Pageantry (Alin and Dane/Chontelle and Cody)		None	
6	Geography Quiz (Kim)	Blind Date (Cody)	Kristy and Jason; Greta and Yiran	Greta and Yiran
7	Car Maths (Kim)	Beauty Salon (Jason)	None	
7	Mystery Picture (Chontelle)	Bodybuilding (Dane)	Nikki and Jack; Kristy and Jason	Nikki and Jack
8	Geek Job (Kristy)	Outback (Dane)	Chontelle and Cody; Kim and Rich	Kim and Rich
9	Fairy Tale (Alin and Dane)		Chontelle and Cody; Kristy and Jason	Kristy and Jason
9	Masquerade Party (Alin and Dane)		Millie and Chard; Chontelle and Cody	Chontelle and Cody
Winners	Millie and Chard			

=== Ratings ===
No.	Title	Air date	Overnight ratings		Ref(s)
No.	Title	Air date	Viewers	Rank	Ref(s)
1	Episode 1	4 October 2012	0.892	8	
2	Episode 2	11 October 2012	0.852	8	
3	Episode 3	18 October 2012	0.831	7	
4	Episode 4	25 October 2012	0.712	12	
5	Episode 5	1 November 2012	1.026	3	
6	Episode 6	8 November 2012	1.284	1	
7	Episode 7	15 November 2012	0.977	2	
8	Episode 8	22 November 2012	0.846	8	
9	Episode 9	29 November 2012	0.736	8	
9	Winner Announced	29 November 2012	0.740	7	

== Season 5 (2013) ==
The twist in Season 5 saw 9 beauties and 8 geeks sent to live on a tropical island of Fiji with no mansion and no luxuries. An extra beauty, Courtenay, joined the team of Alex and Bella after Alex won the first challenge. This season also had two New Zealand contestants, Bella and Zac, as was advertised earlier in the year.

=== Teams ===
Team		Status
The Beauties	The Geeks	Status
Emily Craig, 19 VIC (Ex-Professional Cheerleader)	Brett d'Avoine, 24 VIC (Gamer)	Winner
Erin Barnett, 18 VIC (Babysitter)	Nathan Glover, 24 WA (IT Guru)	Runner-up
Ntula MacDonald, 19 WA (Shopaholic)	Zac Klavs, 18 NZ (Young Historian)	Second eliminated in episode 8
Jenna Tonkin, 20 NSW (Lara Bingle Look-a-Like)	Michael Ando, 26 QLD (Time Traveller)	First eliminated in episode 8
Kassi Kashian, 18 NSW (Trainee Spray Tanner)	Nathan Glover, 22 WA (IT Guru)	Eliminated in episode 7
Courtenay Williamson, 19 NSW (Wannabe WAG)	Alex, 24 VIC (Doctor Who Fanatic)	Eliminated in episode 5
Temaura Lacaze, 22 QLD (Unemployed)	Peter, 21 SA (Calibration Physicist)	Eliminated in episode 4
Erin Barnett (returned to competition)	Matthew Witham (returned to competition)	Eliminated in episode 2
Bella Henry, 20 NZ (Eyebrow Technician)	—N/a	Eliminated in episode 2
Sheridan Sharpe, 21 VIC (Life Saver)	Brandon Cowan, 19 NSW (App Developer)	Eliminated in episode 1

=== Episode progress ===
#	Contestants	Episodes									
#	Contestants	1	2	3	4	5	6	7	8		
1	Emily	WIN	WIN	SAFE	WIN	SAFE	SAFE	SAFE	RISK	RISK	WINNER
1	Brett	SAFE	SAFE	SAFE	SAFE	WIN	WIN	SAFE	RISK	RISK	WINNER
2	Erin	SAFE	OUT				IN	RISK	WIN	WIN	RUNNER-UP
2	Nathan	SAFE	OUT				IN	RISK	WIN	WIN	RUNNER-UP
3	Ntula	SAFE	SAFE	WIN	SAFE	SAFE	SAFE	WIN	WIN	OUT	
3	Zac	SAFE	WIN	SAFE	WIN	SAFE	SAFE	SAFE	WIN	OUT	
4	Jenna	SAFE	SAFE	SAFE	SAFE	RISK	SAFE	SAFE	OUT		
4	Matthew	SAFE	SAFE	SAFE	SAFE	RISK	SAFE	WIN	OUT		
5	Kassi	RISK	RISK	SAFE	SAFE	WIN	WIN	OUT			
5	Brandon	RISK	RISK	SAFE	SAFE	SAFE	SAFE	OUT			
6	Courtenay	SAFE	RISK	SAFE	RISK	OUT	OUT				
6	Alex	WIN	SAFE	WIN	RISK	OUT	OUT				
7	Temaura	SAFE	SAFE	SAFE	OUT						
7	Michael	SAFE	SAFE	SAFE	OUT						
8	Bella	SAFE	OUT								
9	Sheridan	OUT									
9	Peter	OUT									

- Upon winning the challenge in Week 1, Alex who was originally teamed with Bella received a surprise package, upon opening it, Courtenay was inside, which gave Alex two beauties to compete with. In Week 2 it was revealed he would have to eliminate one of his beauties, he decided to eliminated Bella, forming the official team of Alex & Courtenay.
- Instead of the usual power to nominate two teams for elimination, instead the winning teams this week, Zac and Ntula, and Alex and Courtenay, had the power to mix up the couples of two teams. They denied the use of this power, leaving all the teams safe.
- In the Episode 6, Kassi & Brandon and Emily & Brett, had to nominate two teams to return to the competition instead of the usual nominating two teams to go home. Kassi & Brandon nominated Courtenay & Alex, while Emily & Brett nominated Erin & Nathan. In the end, Erin & Nathan won the elimination room quiz and returned to the competition.

The contestants won the competition.
The contestants claimed the runner-up position in the competition.
The contestant won the challenge and their pair was safe from elimination.
The contestant's partner won the challenge and they were safe from elimination.
The contestant did not win the challenge but their pair was safe from elimination.
The contestant and their partner survived elimination.
The contestant and their partner was eliminated.
The contestant was individually up for elimination and survived.
The contestant was individually eliminated.
The contestants did not compete in the week.
The contestants were brought back into the competition.
The contestants were nominated but did not return to the competition.
The contestant withdrew from the competition due to personal reasons.
The contestant won immunity and was safe from elimination.
The contestant's partner won immunity and they were safe from elimination.

=== Ratings ===
No.	Title	Air date	Overnight ratings		Ref(s)
No.	Title	Air date	Viewers	Rank	Ref(s)
1	Episode 1	10 October 2013	804,000	8	
2	Episode 2	17 October 2013	638,000	14	
3	Episode 3	24 October 2013	765,000	12	
4	Episode 4	31 October 2013	834,000	7	
5	Episode 5	7 November 2013	1,089,000	1	
6	Episode 6	14 November 2013	846,000	6	
7	Episode 7	21 November 2013	624,000	10	
8	Episode 8	28 November 2013	803,000	5	

== Season 6 (2014) ==
This season's twist had 8 Australian Geeks paired up with 8 Las Vegas Beauties for the initial round in Vegas. Then the 7 teams that survived moved back to the new mansion back in Australia where 7 Australian Beauties are introduced to the Geeks. The Geeks must choose which beauty to progress in the competition with. The first episode aired on 9 October 2014.

=== Teams ===
Each Geek is listed with their two Beauties, one from Australia and one from Las Vegas, with the first being the Beauty that they progressed in the competition with, and the second being the Beauty eliminated in the second episode. Las Vegas Beauties are marked with a †.

Team		Status
The Beauties	The Geeks	Status
Candice Stinson, 25 CA (NHL Ice Girl) †	Nick Hamilton, 19 NSW (Commerce Student)	Eliminated in Episode 2 (Siobhan); Winner
Siobhan Allen, 21 QLD (Animal Lover)	Nick Hamilton, 19 NSW (Commerce Student)	Eliminated in Episode 2 (Siobhan); Winner
Nicole Burns, 22 CA (Nanny) †	Alexander Tomisich, 19 VIC (History Studeny)	Eliminated in Episode 2 (Sara); Runner-up
Sara Macnamara, 22 NSW (Casual Waitress)	Alexander Tomisich, 19 VIC (History Studeny)	Eliminated in Episode 2 (Sara); Runner-up
Frances Russell, 20 NSW (Promo Girl)	Oliver O'Neill, 23 WA (Robotic Engineering)	Eliminated in Episode 2 (Amber); Entered in Episode 2 (Frances); Runner-up
Amber Diamond, 20 CA (Actress) †	Oliver O'Neill, 23 WA (Robotic Engineering)	Eliminated in Episode 2 (Amber); Entered in Episode 2 (Frances); Runner-up
Emily Harris, 20 VIC (Dental Assistant)	Tate Putnins, 21 VIC (Engineering Student)	Eliminated in Episode 2 (Rachel); Entered in Episode 2 (Emily); Eliminated in episode 8
Rachel Michelle Walter, 25 CA (Beauty Queen) †	Tate Putnins, 21 VIC (Engineering Student)	Eliminated in Episode 2 (Rachel); Entered in Episode 2 (Emily); Eliminated in episode 8
Hanna Holmes, 22 QLD (Weekend Bartender)	Dylan Swinburne, 19 WA (App Developer)	Eliminated in Episode 2 (Toneata); Entered in Episode 2 (Hanna); Eliminated in Episode 4 Returned in Episode 6 Eliminated in episode 7
Toneata Morgan, 18 CA (Sportswoman) †	Dylan Swinburne, 19 WA (App Developer)	Eliminated in Episode 2 (Toneata); Entered in Episode 2 (Hanna); Eliminated in Episode 4 Returned in Episode 6 Eliminated in episode 7
Chrystal Rachuj, 23 CA (Executive Assistant) †	James Van Schoonhoven, 26 SA (Film Buff)	Eliminated in Episode 2 (Alisha); Eliminated in episode 5
Alisha Van Horen, 22 NSW (Beauty Therapist)	James Van Schoonhoven, 26 SA (Film Buff)	Eliminated in Episode 2 (Alisha); Eliminated in episode 5
Brooke Michelle Wood, 24 QLD (Mobile Hairdresser)	Shaun Howard, 21 NSW (Naval Avionics Technician)	Eliminated in Episode 2 (Vanessa); Entered in Episode 2 (Brooke); Eliminated in episode 3
Vanessa, 26 CA (Fitness Fanatic) †	Shaun Howard, 21 NSW (Naval Avionics Technician)	Eliminated in Episode 2 (Vanessa); Entered in Episode 2 (Brooke); Eliminated in episode 3
Jennifer, 23 NJ (Former Bartender) †	Bowen, 18 NSW (Star Trek Fanatic)	Eliminated in episode 1

=== Episode progress ===
#	Contestants	Episodes									
#	Contestants	1	2	3	4	5	6	7	8		
1	Candice	SAFE	RISK	WIN	SAFE	SAFE	SAFE	SAFE	SAFE	SAFE	WINNER
1	Nick	WIN	SAFE	SAFE	SAFE	SAFE	WIN	WIN	WIN	SAFE	WINNER
2	Nicole	WIN	WIN	SAFE	WIN	WIN	WIN	RISK	WIN	SAFE	RUNNER-UP
2	Alexander	SAFE	SAFE	SAFE	SAFE	SAFE	SAFE	RISK	SAFE	SAFE	RUNNER-UP
2	Frances		RISK	SAFE	SAFE	RISK	SAFE	WIN	RISK	WIN	RUNNER-UP
2	Oliver	RISK	SAFE	SAFE	WIN	RISK	SAFE	SAFE	RISK	WIN	RUNNER-UP
3	Emily		RISK	SAFE	SAFE	SAFE	SAFE	SAFE	RISK	OUT	
3	Tate	SAFE	SAFE	WIN	SAFE	WIN	SAFE	SAFE	RISK	OUT	
4	Hanna		RISK	RISK	OUT		IN	OUT			
4	Dylan	SAFE	SAFE	RISK	OUT		IN	OUT			
5	Chrystal	RISK	RISK	SAFE	RISK	OUT					
5	James	RISK	SAFE	SAFE	RISK	OUT					
6	Brooke		RISK	OUT			OUT				
6	Shaun	RISK	SAFE	OUT			OUT				
7
7	Sara		OUT								
7	Alisha		OUT								
7	Siobhan		OUT								
7	Rachel	SAFE	OUT								
7	Toneata	SAFE	OUT								
7	Amber	RISK	OUT								
7	Vanessa	RISK	OUT								
8	Jennifer	OUT									
8	Bowen	OUT									

The contestants won the competition.
The contestants claimed the runner-up position in the competition.
The contestant won the challenge and their pair was safe from elimination.
The contestant's partner won the challenge and they were safe from elimination.
The contestant did not win the challenge but their pair was safe from elimination.
The contestant and their partner survived elimination.
The contestant and their partner was eliminated.
The contestant was individually up for elimination and survived.
The contestant was individually eliminated.
The contestants did not compete in the week.
The contestants were brought back into the competition.
The contestants were nominated but did not return to the competition.
The contestant withdrew from the competition due to personal reasons.
The contestant won immunity and was safe from elimination.
The contestant's partner won immunity and they were safe from elimination.

- In episode 1, each geek was partnered with an American Beauty. In episode 2, each of the remaining geeks was also given an Australian beauty (instead of having a challenge winner). At the end of episode 2, each geek had to choose between their American and Australian Beauties to determine who stayed. Nicole won immunity by winning the Beauty challenge that week.
- In episode 1, the winning teams had to nominate who they wanted to save, and the remaining teams had to compete in a question round to determine the first couple to be eliminated.
- In episode 1, Bowen was the first geek to be eliminated, but before he left the competition he was given the first makeover this season.
- In episode 4, on winning the geek challenge, Oliver was the second geek who received his makeover this season.
- In episode 5, Tate won a modeling contract by winning the geek challenge.
- In episode 8, Nick won the geek challenge and Nicole won the beauty challenge. They were both through to the final quiz, as were their partners. Frances and Oliver competed against Emily and Tate in a third challenge, a spin of a roulette wheel. The game was won by Frances and Oliver, thus eliminating Emily and Tate. The three remaining couples participated in the final quiz, which was won by Candice and Nick. The two remaining couples did not get to finish the quiz, and therefore were all runners-up.

=== Challenges and eliminations ===
Week	Beauty/Geek	Challenge	Winner	Nominated	Eliminated
1	Beauty	Australian knowledge (won by Chrystal/Nicole), afterwards an interview with Olivia Newton-John	Nicole	Dylan/Toneata (safe)	Jennifer/Bowen
1	Geek	Striptease	Nick	Tate/Rachel (safe)	Jennifer/Bowen
2	Beauty	Recite the table of 3 while being submerged in a fish tank	Nicole	—N/a	Sara; Rachel; Toneata; Alisha; Amber; Vanessa; Siobhan
2	Geek	Kissing challenge	No one	Tate: chose Emily over Rachel; Dylan: Chose Hanna over Toneata; James: chose Chrystal over Alisha; Oliver: chose Frances over Amber; Shaun: chose Brooke over Vanessa; Nick: chose Candice over Siobhan	Sara; Rachel; Toneata; Alisha; Amber; Vanessa; Siobhan
3	Beauty	Talk with a historian about a given subject	Candice	Shaun/Brooke	Shaun/Brooke
3	Geek	Take as many selfies with girls	Tate	Dylan/Hanna	Shaun/Brooke
4	Beauty	Give a science presentation	Nicole	Dylan/Hanna	Dylan/Hanna
4	Geek	Film a cologne commercial	Oliver	James/Chrystal	Dylan/Hanna
5	Beauty	Identify body parts	Nicole	Oliver/Frances	James/Chrystal
5	Geek	Underwear commercial	Tate	James/Chrystal	James/Chrystal
6	Beauty	Identify and eat animals	Nicole	Dylan/Hanna	Shaun/Brooke
6	Geek	'What women want' advertorial	Nick	Shaun/Brooke	Shaun/Brooke
7	Beauty	Teach foreigners English	Frances	Alexander/Nicole	Dylan/Hanna
7	Geek	Answer a question from a girl	Nick	Dylan/Hanna	Dylan/Hanna
8	Beauty	Public debate	Nicole	—N/a	—N/a
8	Geek	Blind date with tasks	Nick	—N/a	—N/a

== Season 7 (2021) ==
The seventh season began airing on 11 July 2021, it broadcast for the first time on Nine Network.

=== Teams ===
Final Teams		Status
The Beauties	The Geeks	Status
Kiera Johnstone, 23 VIC (Public Servant)	Lachlan Mansell, 32 NSW (Motorsports Journalist)	Winner
Josie Werner, 21 NSW (Dancer)	George Goldfeder, 27 VIC (Martial Arts Fanatic)	Runner-up
Eliza Sowada-Smith, 21 NSW (Receptionist)	Alexander Wojno, 26 VIC (Maths Teacher)	Runner-up
Jess Heatley, 23 SA (Journalist)	James Letheby, 25 SA (Cosplayer)	Eliminated in episode 11
Aira Charles, 23 NSW (Medical Secretary)	Sam Ready, 23 VIC (Footy Fan)	Eliminated in episode 11
Ashleigh Thomason, 31 QLD (Princess Performer)	Mitchell Berryman, 28 VIC (Video Gamer)	Eliminated in episode 10
Aira Charles (returned to competition)	Sam Ready (returned to competition)	Eliminated in episode 8
Leticia Llanos, 25 VIC (Dental Receptionist)	Kyle Blaize, 22 SA (Military Historian)	Eliminated in episode 7
Bryanna Reynolds, 29 VIC (Entertainment Reporter)	Kiran Rao, 30 VIC (Law Graduate)	Eliminated in episode 6
Jessica Antoniou, 19 WA (Retail)	Jackson Palmer, 19 SA (Podcaster)	Eliminated in episode 5
Gabrielle Loye, 20 QLD (Student)	Frank Liu-Fu, 28 NSW (Doctor)	Eliminated in episode 4

=== Episode progress ===
#	Contestants	Week 1 (Note: There were no eliminations in Week 1 - all challenge winners in Week 1 won a date with their partner. Sophie re-paired some contestants after each Episode's mixer in the first week.)			Week 2			Week 3			Week 4		
#	Contestants	Ep 1	Ep 2	Ep 3	Ep 4	Ep 5	Ep 6	Ep 7	Ep 8	Ep 9	Ep 10	Ep 11	Ep 12
1	Kiera	SAFE	SAFE	SAFE (Note: Kiera was originally paired with James. She re-paired with George.)	SAFE (Note: Kiera was originally re-paired with George. She re-paired with Lachlan.)	SAFE	SAFE	WIN	SAFE	SAFE	SAFE	WIN	WINNER
1	Lachlan	SAFE	SAFE (Note: Lachlan was originally paired with Gabrielle. He re-paired with Josie.)	WIN	SAFE (Note: Lachlan was originally re-paired with Josie. He re-paired with Kiera.)	SAFE	SAFE	WIN	SAFE	SAFE	WIN	WIN	WINNER
2	Josie	SAFE	SAFE (Note: Josie was originally paired with Jackson. She re-paired with Lachlan.)	WIN	SAFE (Note: Josie was originally re-paired with Lachlan. She re-paired again with George.)	WIN	WIN	SAFE	SAFE	WIN	SAFE	WIN	RUNNER-UP
2	George	WIN	SAFE	SAFE (Note: George was originally paired with Leticia. He re-paired with Kiera.)	SAFE (Note: George was originally re-paired with Kiera. He re-paired with Josie.)	WIN	WIN	SAFE	SAFE	WIN	SAFE	WIN	RUNNER-UP
3	Eliza	SAFE	SAFE	SAFE (Note: Eliza was originally paired with Alexander. She re-paired with Kyle.)	SAFE (Note: Eliza was originally re-paired with Kyle. She was paired back with Alexander.)	SAFE	RISK	RISK	SAFE	SAFE	RISK	RISK	RUNNER-UP
3	Alexander	SAFE	WIN	SAFE (Note: Alexander was originally paired with Eliza. He re-paired with Leticia.)	SAFE (Note: Alexander was originally re-paired with Leticia. He was paired back with Eliza.)	SAFE	RISK	RISK	WIN	SAFE	RISK	RISK	RUNNER-UP
4	Jess	SAFE	SAFE	SAFE (Note: Jess was originally paired with Kyle. She re-paired with James.)	WIN	SAFE	SAFE	SAFE	SAFE	SAFE	SAFE	OUT	
4	James	SAFE	SAFE	SAFE (Note: James was originally paired with Kiera. He re-paired with Jess.)	SAFE	SAFE	SAFE	SAFE	SAFE	SAFE	SAFE	OUT	
5	Aira	SAFE	SAFE	SAFE	SAFE	RISK	SAFE	WIN	OUT	IN	SAFE	OUT	
5	Sam	SAFE	SAFE	SAFE	SAFE	RISK	SAFE	WIN	OUT	IN	SAFE	OUT	
6	Ashleigh	WIN	SAFE	SAFE	SAFE	SAFE	WIN	SAFE	RISK	SAFE	OUT		
6	Mitchell	WIN	SAFE	SAFE	SAFE	SAFE	WIN	SAFE	RISK	SAFE	OUT		
7	Leticia	WIN	SAFE	SAFE (Note: Leticia was originally paired with George. She re-paired with Alexander.)	SAFE (Note: Leticia was originally re-paired with Alexander. She re-paired again with Kyle.)	WIN	SAFE	OUT		OUT			
7	Kyle	SAFE	SAFE	SAFE (Note: Kyle was originally paired with Jess. He re-paired with Eliza.)	SAFE (Note: Kyle was originally re-paired with Eliza. He re-paired again with Leticia.)	WIN	SAFE	OUT		OUT			
8	Bryanna	SAFE	SAFE	SAFE	WIN	SAFE	OUT			OUT			
8	Kiran	SAFE	SAFE	SAFE	SAFE	SAFE	OUT			OUT			
9	Jessica	SAFE	SAFE (Note: Jessica was originally paired with Frank. She re-paired with Jackson.)	SAFE	RISK	OUT							
9	Jackson	SAFE	SAFE (Note: Jackson was originally paired with Josie. He re-paired with Jessica.)	SAFE	RISK	OUT							
10	Gabrielle	SAFE	SAFE (Note: Gabrielle was originally paired with Lachlan. She re-paired with Frank.)	SAFE	OUT								
10	Frank	SAFE	SAFE (Note: Frank was originally paired with Jessica. He re-paired with Gabrielle.)	SAFE	OUT								

The contestants won the competition.
The contestants claimed the runner-up position in the competition.
The contestant won the challenge and won a date with their partner.
The contestant's partner won the challenge and won a date with their partner.
The contestant did not win the challenge but their pair was safe from elimination.
The contestant and their partner survived elimination.
The contestant and their partner was eliminated.
The contestants were brought back into the competition.
The contestants competed to return to the competition, but did not succeed.

=== Challenges and eliminations ===
Episode	Beauty challenge (winner)	Geek challenge (winner)	Up for Elimination	Eliminated
1	Seal Trainers at Taronga Zoo (Letitia & George and Ashleigh & Mitchell)			
2		Fashion Photography (Alexander)		
3	KIIS 106.5 Radio Programme (Josie & Lachlan)			
4	Oz Comic Con Character Creation (Bryanna (Note: The challenge winner received a makeover in lieu of a date.) and Jess)		Jessica & Jackson; Gabrielle & Frank	Gabrielle & Frank
5	Infomercial selling at Today Extra (Leticia & Kyle and Josie & George)		Jessica & Jackson; Aira & Sam	Jessica & Jackson
6	Wrestling (Ashleigh & Mitchell and Josie & George)		Eliza & Alexander; Bryanna & Kiran	Bryanna & Kiran
7	Couples' Maternity Class (Kiera & Lachlan and Aira & Sam)		Leticia & Kyle; Eliza & Alexander	Leticia & Kyle
8		Teaching a gym class (Alexander)	Ashleigh & Mitchell; Aira & Sam	Aira & Sam
9	Corporate Presentations (Josie & George)		None	None (Note: Winning team Josie & George were given the choice to bring back one of the three most-recently eliminated teams. They chose Aira & Sam.)
10 (Note: All remaining geeks who had not received a makeover received one following Ashleigh & Mitchell's elimination.)	Half-time entertainment at the Penrith Panthers NRL Game (Lachlan)		Eliza & Alexander; Ashleigh & Mitchell	Ashleigh & Mitchell
11 (Note: This episode was a double-elimination episode. Instead of the usual bottom two, there was a bottom three. The winners were determined by the teams' combined efforts.)	Dungeons & Dragons (Kiera & Josie)	Speed Dating (Lachlan & George)	Aira & Sam; Eliza & Alexander; Jess & James	Aira & Sam; Jess & James
12	Magic Mike Live (Keira & Lachlan)		None	None (Note: Eliminated teams voted for their winning pair.)

=== Ratings ===
No.	Title	Air date	Timeslot	Overnight ratings		Consolidated ratings		Total viewers	Ref(s)
No.	Title	Air date	Timeslot	Viewers	Rank	Viewers	Rank	Total viewers	Ref(s)
1	Episode 1	11 July 2021	Sunday 7:00pm	808,000	3	99,000	3	907,000	
2	Episode 2	12 July 2021	Monday 7:30pm	622,000	12	89,000	10	711,000	
3	Episode 3	13 July 2021	Tuesday 7:30pm	577,000	14	84,000	12	661,000	
4	Episode 4	18 July 2021	Sunday 7:30pm	776,000	4	64,000	3	840,000	
5	Episode 5	19 July 2021	Monday 7:00pm	618,000	13	77,000	10	695,000	
6	Episode 6	20 July 2021	Tuesday 7:00pm	607,000	12	80,000	11	687,000	
7	Episode 7	25 July 2021	Sunday 7:00pm	692,000	8	50,000	8	742,000	
8	Episode 8	26 July 2021	Monday 7:30pm	562,000	17	—N/a	—N/a	562,000	
9	Episode 9	27 July 2021	Tuesday 7:30pm	541,000	14	51,000	13	598,000	
10	Episode 10	1 August 2021	Sunday 7:00pm	678,000	9	57,000	9	735,000	
11	Episode 11	2 August 2021	Monday 7:30pm	519,000	15	83,000	15	602,000	
12	Grand Final	3 August 2021	Tuesday 7:30pm	588,000	16	72,000	14	660,000	
12	Winners Announced	3 August 2021	Tuesday 7:30pm	665,000	12	57,000	11	722,000	

== Season 8 (2022) ==
The eighth season begins airing on 17 July 2022, for the second time on Nine Network. This season reverted to the original elimination format of a head-to-head quiz between the teams up for elimination.

=== Teams ===
Final Teams		Status
The Beauties	The Geeks	Status
Karly Fisher, 28 WA (Hairdresser)	Aaron Seeto, 30 NSW (Train Driver)	Winner
Bri Auty, 30 NSW (Ex-NRL Cheerleader)	Christopher Mattiske, 30 SA (International Yu-Gi-Oh! Champion)	Runner-up
Tegan Burns, 26 VIC (Professional Dancer)	Anthony Farah, 26 NSW (Harry Potter Fanatic)	Runner-up
Tara Schwarz, 22 VIC (Mermaid Performer)	Michael Gebicki, 25 NSW (Children's Party Entertainer)	Eliminated in episode 11
Emily Mccarthy, 25 NSW (Flight Attendant)	Jason Mihalopoulos, 29 VIC (Musician)	Eliminated in episode 10
Heidi Mitchell, 20 VIC (Waitress)	Mike Gambaro, 20 QLD (Batman Fanatic)	Eliminated in episode 9
Aimee Woolley, 23 TAS (Trainee Nurse)	Jayden Darcy, 24 NSW (Martial Arts Expert)	Eliminated in episode 7
Sophie Taylor, 20 WA (Aspiring Prime Minister)	Alex Waters, 27 SA (Bookworm)	Eliminated in episode 6
Angelique Nguyen, 21 NSW (Social Media Content Creator)	Sam Mitchell, 25 VIC (Esports Champion)	Eliminated in episode 5
Daniella Caceres, 26 WA (Miss Universe Finalist)	Nate Campbell, 20 SA (Japanese Anime Expert)	Eliminated in episode 4

=== Episode progress ===
#	Contestants	Week 1 (Note: There were no eliminations in the first three episodes - all challenge winners in Episodes 2 & 3 won a date with their partner. Sophie re-paired some contestants after each Episode's mixer in Episodes 2 & 3.)				Week 2				Week 3			
#	Contestants	Ep 1 (Note: Neither challenge on Episode 1 had a winner - instead, they were used to show the other team a little of their personality in order to determine their original pairings. The Geeks were given an opportunity to be the first to step forward and ask a Beauty on a date - and Anthony did, inviting Tegan.)	Ep 2	Ep 3	Ep 4	Ep 5	Ep 6	Ep 7	Ep 8	Ep 9	Ep 10	Ep 11	Ep 12
1	Karly	SAFE	SAFE	HIGH	WIN	SAFE	SAFE	SAFE	SAFE	SAFE	SAFE	WIN	WINNER
1	Aaron	SAFE	SAFE	HIGH	WIN	SAFE	SAFE	SAFE	SAFE	SAFE	SAFE	WIN	WINNER
2	Bri	SAFE	WIN	SAFE	SAFE	SAFE	WIN	SAFE	SAFE	RISK	WIN	SAFE	RUNNER-UP
2	Christopher	SAFE	WIN	SAFE	SAFE	SAFE	WIN	SAFE	SAFE	RISK	SAFE	SAFE	RUNNER-UP
3	Tegan	DATE	SAFE	SAFE	RISK	RISK	SAFE	SAFE	SAFE	SAFE	RISK	RISK	RUNNER-UP
3	Anthony	DATE	SAFE	SAFE	RISK	RISK	SAFE	SAFE	SAFE	SAFE	RISK	RISK	RUNNER-UP
4	Tara	SAFE	SAFE	HIGH	SAFE	WIN	SAFE	WIN	SAFE	SAFE	SAFE	OUT	
4	Michael	SAFE	SAFE	HIGH	SAFE	WIN	SAFE	WIN	SAFE	SAFE	WIN	OUT	
5	Emily	SAFE	SAFE	SAFE (Note: Emily was originally paired with Jayden. She re-paired with Nate.)	SAFE (Note: Emily was originally re-paired with Nate. She re-paired again with Jason.)	SAFE	RISK	RISK	SAFE	WIN	OUT		
5	Jason	SAFE	SAFE	SAFE (Note: Jason was originally paired with Sophie. He re-paired with Heidi.)	SAFE (Note: Jason was originally re-paired with Heidi. He re-paired again with Emily.)	SAFE	RISK	RISK	SAFE	WIN	OUT		
6	Heidi	SAFE	SAFE	SAFE (Note: Heidi was originally paired with Nate. She re-paired with Jason.)	WIN (Note: Heidi was originally re-paired with Jason. She re-paired again with Mike.)	SAFE	WIN	SAFE	SAFE	OUT			
6	Mike	SAFE	SAFE	SAFE	WIN (Note: Mike was originally paired with Daniella. He re-paired with Heidi.)	SAFE	WIN	SAFE	SAFE	OUT			
7	Aimee	SAFE	SAFE	WIN (Note: Aimee was originally paired with Alex. She re-paired with Jayden.)	SAFE	SAFE	SAFE	OUT					
7	Jayden	SAFE	SAFE	WIN (Note: Jayden was originally paired with Emily. He re-paired with Aimee.)	SAFE	SAFE	SAFE	OUT					
8	Sophie	SAFE	SAFE	SAFE (Note: Sophie was originally paired with Jason. She re-paired with Alex.)	SAFE	SAFE	OUT						
8	Alex	SAFE	SAFE	SAFE (Note: Alex was originally paired with Aimee. He re-paired with Sophie.)	SAFE	SAFE	OUT						
9	Angelique	SAFE	SAFE	SAFE	SAFE	OUT							
9	Sam	SAFE	SAFE	SAFE	SAFE	OUT							
10	Daniella	SAFE	SAFE	SAFE	OUT (Note: Daniella was originally paired with Mike. She re-paired with Nate.)								
10	Nate	SAFE	SAFE	SAFE (Note: Nate was originally paired with Heidi. He re-paired with Emily.)	OUT (Note: Nate was originally re-paired with Emily. He re-paired with Daniella.)								

The contestants won the competition.
The contestants claimed the runner-up position in the competition.
The contestant won the challenge and won a date with their partner and/or was safe from elimination.
The contestant's partner won the challenge and won a date with their partner and/or was safe from elimination.
The contestant did not win the challenge but their pair was safe from elimination.
The contestant and their partner survived elimination.
The contestant and their partner was eliminated.

=== Challenges and eliminations ===
Episode	Beauty challenge (winner)	Geek challenge (winner)	Up for Elimination	Eliminated
1	Assault Course	Interrogation		
2	Action Movie Stunts (Bri & Christopher)			
3	Fashion Photoshoot (Aimee & Jayden)			
4	Live TV Presenting on Today Extra (Heidi & Mike (Note: This challenge winner received a makeover in lieu of a date.) and Karly & Aaron)		Tegan & Anthony; Daniella & Nate	Daniella & Nate
5	Flight Simulator (Tara & Michael)		Tegan & Anthony; Angelique & Sam	Angelique & Sam
6	Dog Show (Bri & Christopher and Heidi & Mike)		Emily & Jason; Sophie & Alex	Sophie & Alex
7	Medieval Fighting (Michael & Tara)		Aimee & Jayden; Emily & Jason	Aimee & Jayden
8 (Note: There was no challenge or elimination in Episode 8 - instead, Beauties and Geeks spent time in their pairs visiting each other's day-to-day lives to gain a deeper understanding of each other.)	Life Swap			
9	TikTok Content Creation (Emily & Jason)		Bri & Christopher; Heidi & Mike	Heidi & Mike
10 (Note: All remaining geeks who had not received a makeover received one following the challenge.)	Music Video (Michael and Bri) (Note: Beauties and Geeks competed separately - and the winner from each group saved themselves and their partner from elimination. Once the winners were announced, Aaron was also announced as saving himself and Karly, leaving the other two teams in the bottom two.)		Emily & Jason; Tegan & Anthony	Emily & Jason
11	Trivia Host (Karly)	Speed Dating (Aaron)	Michael & Tara; Tegan & Anthony	Michael & Tara
12	Abseiling (Karly & Aaron)		None	None (Note: Eliminated teams voted for their winning pair.)

=== Ratings ===
No.	Title	Air date	Timeslot	Overnight ratings		Consolidated ratings		Total viewers	Ref(s)
No.	Title	Air date	Timeslot	Viewers	Rank	Viewers	Rank	Total viewers	Ref(s)
1	Episode 1	17 July 2022	Sunday 7:00pm	476,000	7	341,000	5	817,000	
2	Episode 2	18 July 2022	Monday 7:30pm	405,000	16	329,000	14	734,000	
3	Episode 3	19 July 2022	Tuesday 7:30pm	409,000	14	295,000	13	704,000	
4	Episode 4	20 July 2022	Wednesday 7:30pm	532,000	7	378,000	6	910,000	
5	Episode 5	24 July 2022	Sunday 8:00pm	390,000	8	333,000	7	723,000	
6	Episode 6	25 July 2022	Monday 7:30pm	471,000	12	350,000	13	821,000	
7	Episode 7	26 July 2022	Tuesday 7:30pm	421,000	13	275,000	13	706,000	
8	Episode 8	27 July 2022	Wednesday 7:30pm	474,000	11	238,000	12	812,000	
9	Episode 9	31 July 2022	Sunday 8:00pm	413,000	9	294,000	8	707,000	
10	Episode 10	1 August 2022	Monday 7:30pm	497,000	13	335,000	13	832,000	
11	Episode 11	2 August 2022	Tuesday 7:30pm	400,000	14	271,000	13	671,000	
12	Episode 12	3 August 2022	Wednesday 7:30pm	478,000	11	312,000	11	790,000	
12	Winners Announced	3 August 2022	Wednesday 7:30pm	537,000	9	329,000	10	866,000	

== See also ==
- The Mole (Australian TV series) – A similar show involving teamwork and also utilizes immunity and quizzes as a method of elimination
