= Hookah (Tyga song) =

Single by Tyga featuring Young Thug
- Released: April 9, 2014
- Recorded: 2014
- Genre: Hip hop
- Length: 3:22
- Label: Young Money; Cash Money; Republic
- Songwriters: Michael Stevenson; Jeffrey Williams; Jess Jackson
- Producer: London on da Track

Tyga singles chronology
"Loyal" (2014)	"Hookah" (2014)	"Bend Ova" (2014)

Young Thug singles chronology
"Stoner" (2014)	"Hookah" (2014)	"About the Money" (2014)

"Hookah" is a song by American rapper Tyga. It was released on April 9, 2014 as the second single—following "Wait for a Minute" (with Justin Bieber)—for his fourth album The Gold Album: 18th Dynasty (2015), from which it was ultimately excluded. The song, produced by London on da Track, features a guest appearance from then-upcoming rapper Young Thug. "Hookah" debuted at number 94 on the US Billboard Hot 100 and has since peaked at number 85; it received platinum certification by the Recording Industry Association of America (RIAA).

== Background and release ==
On March 15, 2014, Tyga posted a snippet of the song on his Facebook page. Two days later on March 17, the full version of "Hookah" premiered and on April 9, 2014, the song released for digital download.

== Music video ==
The music video was filmed on April 21, 2014, and was directed by Alex Nazari and Tyga. On June 6, 2014, the music video premiered.

== Remixes ==
On May 18, 2014, American rapper K Camp released a remix to "Hookah".

== Track listing ==
Digital single

No.	Title	Writer(s)	Producer(s)	Length
1.	"Hookah" (featuring Young Thug)	Michael Ray Nguyen-Stevenson; Jeffrey Williams; Jess Jackson	London on da Track	3:22

== Chart performance ==
=== Weekly charts ===
Chart (2014)	Peak position
Belgium Urban (Ultratop Flanders)	32
France (SNEP)	188
Germany (Deutsche Black Charts)	10
US Billboard Hot 100	85
US Hot R&B/Hip-Hop Songs (Billboard)	24

=== Year-end charts ===
Chart (2014)	Position
US Hot R&B/Hip-Hop Songs (Billboard)	66

== Certifications ==
Region	Certification	Certified units/sales
New Zealand (RMNZ)	Gold	15,000^{‡}
United Kingdom (BPI)	Silver	200,000^{‡}
United States (RIAA)	Platinum	1,000,000^{‡}
^{‡} Sales+streaming figures based on certification alone.
