= Drunk Arcade =

Single by Bombs Away featuring The Twins
- Released: 10 May 2013
- Genre: Electro house
- Length: 3:15 (radio edit)
- Label: Shock Records
- Songwriter(s): Matthew and Thomas Coleman

Bombs Away singles chronology
"Party Bass" (2012)	"Drunk Arcade" (2013)	"Assassinate" (2013)

"Drunk Arcade" (subtitled Back Back Forward Punch) is a song recorded by Australian DJ vocal and producer duo Bombs Away featuring The Twin. The song was released digitally on 10 May 2013. Upon release the record label said "If you grew up playing games in front of the TV with your mum telling you it would make your eyes square, this one’s for you!". The song peaked at number 67 on the Australian ARIA Charts.

== Track listing ==
- Digital download
1. "Drunk Arcade" (Original Radio Edit) – 3:15
- Digital download (Remixes)
1. "Drunk Arcade" (Denzel Park Remix) – 5:40
2. "Drunk Arcade" (Club Mix) – 5:25
3. "Drunk Arcade" (Chardy & Kronic! Remix) – 4:52
4. "Drunk Arcade" (Danny T Mix) – 5:34
5. "Drunk Arcade" (Reece Low Remix) – 5:23
6. "Drunk Arcade" (Krunk! Mix) – 4:54
7. "Drunk Arcade" (Sonic Boom Mix) – 5:08

== Charts ==
Chart (2013)	Position
Australia Charts (ARIA)	67

== Release history ==
Country	Date	Format	Label
Australia	10 May 2013	Digital download	Shock Records
