= Big Booty Bitches =

Single by Bombs Away
- Released: October 2010
- Recorded: 2010
- Genre: Electro house
- Length: 3:18 (radio edit)
- Label: Shock

Bombs Away singles chronology
"Big Booty Bitches" (2010)	"Swagger" (2011)

"Big Booty Bitches" is a song recorded by A Lost People and then remixed by the Australian duo Bombs Away. The remix was released digitally in October 2010 and further remixes followed in November. The song peaked at number 55 on the Australian ARIA Charts and was certified gold in 2013.

== Track listing ==
- Digital download
1. "Big Booty Bitches" (Dirtyloud Mix) – 5:26
2. "Big Booty Bitches" (Dirtyloud Instrumental) – 5:26
- Digital download (remixes)
1. "Big Booty Bitches" (Original Mix) – 5:34
2. "Big Booty Bitches" (Thomas Hart Mix) – 6:06
3. "Big Booty Bitches" (Rave Radio Mix) – 5:03
4. "Big Booty Bitches" (Ryan Riback Big Mix) – 7:19
5. "Big Booty Bitches" (Original Radio Edit) – 3:18
6. "Big Booty Bitches" (Clean Radio Edit) – 3:22

== Charts ==
Chart (2010/11)	Peak position
Australia (ARIA)	55

== Certification ==
Region	Certification	Certified units/sales
Australia (ARIA)	Gold	35,000^{^}
^{^} Shipments figures based on certification alone.

== Release history ==
Country	Date	Format	Label	Catalogue
Australia	October 2010	Digital download	Shock Records	DN0090
Australia	20 November 2010	Digital download	Shock Records	DN0090
