= Philmont (band) =

American Christian rock band

- Origin: Charlotte, North Carolina, United States
- Genres: Christian rock, pop punk
- Years active: 2005–2012
- Label: ForeFront
- Past members: Scott Taube; Josiah Prince; Josh Guion; Matthew Arcaini; Abe Hege; Todd Davis; Jeremi Hough; Justin Sams; Ethan Ricks; Charlee Bombay

Philmont was an American Christian pop punk band based out of Charlotte, North Carolina. They were signed to Forefront Records / EMI CMG until Spring 2010. Their debut album, Attention, was released on August 25, 2009. They released two independent EPs before breaking up in August 2012.

== History ==
Philmont was formed by Scott Taube, Josiah Prince, Abe Hege, and Matthew Arcaini in the summer of 2005. They recorded their independent debut EP Take Cover in December of that year. One year later, Philmont traveled to Eudora, Kansas, to record their Photosynthetic EP at Black Lodge Studios with Ed Rose. Matthew Arcaini, who left the band after Take Cover, produced a track on the Photosynthetic EP as well. The band has also recorded some demos in 2005.

Philmont released Photosynthetic independently on March 6, 2007, at Tremont Music Hall in Charlotte. That July, after adding Justin Sams on bass, the band performed at the 2007 Cornerstone Festival in Bushnell, Illinois, where they were discovered by representatives of EMI-CMG. Philmont showcased for the label group that fall and were soon offered a recording contract with Forefront Records. Hege unexpectedly left the band just before the signing took place. Todd Davis had played in a band with Josiah prior to Philmont and was recruited on short notice. Philmont signed the deal a few days before Christmas of 2007.

After signing with Forefront, the band spent several months writing songs in preparation for recording their first full-length album. They spent April and May 2008 recording twelve songs in Nashville, Tennessee, with producer Rob Hawkins. The five-song Oh Snap EP was digitally released on August 19, 2008, and physically released on April 21, 2009. Their first single "I Can't Stand to Fall" was released to CHR and Christian Rock Radio in July 2008.

Philmont released their debut full-length Attention on August 25, 2009.

In September 2008, a music video for EP song "The Difference" was released to YouTube. The band filmed and directed the entire video themselves, as documented in a "behind-the-scenes" video, also available on YouTube. The music video gained exposure on TV programming such as Steelroots, JCTV, The Merge, and Gospel Music Channel; it was included in the spring 2009 video playlist for American Eagle stores nationwide and was also featured on the X 2009 CD/DVD compilation. Four other self-made music videos have been released since then, for the songs "I Can't Stand to Fall", "Back Down", "Another Name", and "My Hippocratic Oath". All the music videos can be seen on YouTube, and are included with the purchase of Attention on iTunes.

Philmont toured internationally in support of Attention with many bands including Family Force 5, Fireflight, Pillar, This Beautiful Republic, Eleventyseven, Addison Road, Wavorly, and Capital Lights. Philmont added Josh Guion as a touring bassist in late 2009, moving Justin to rhythm guitar and Scott to vocals only.

In a post on the official Philmont blog, March 3, 2010, Todd Davis announced his departure from the band, describing the events of his final show with his bandmates. After Todd's departure, Philmont recruited Nashville drummer Scott Sellers as a brief fill-in before announcing permanent drummer Jeremi Hough, as well as the promotion of Josh Guion to band member.

On August 11, 2010, the band put out a new single, "You Will Remain", on iTunes independently, after their departure from Forefront Records. Philmont started an online fundraiser through Kickstarter in September to help finish The Transition EP, as mixing and mastering still needed completion and the band lacked funding. People who donated through the website received various Philmont rewards based on how much they donated. The Transition EP was released on October 19.

On March 11, 2011, they released the music video for "Closer".

On July 28, 2011, Jeremi Hough left the band to get married. On October 5, 2011, the lead singer of Philmont said on a blog that they would release videos of some new demos. On November 12, 2011, Philmont said that they finished vocals for a demo titled "Good Morning Sunrise". In a blog on December 14, 2011, Justin Sams wrote that he was leaving the band to become an art designer and tattoo artist.

Philmont released an acoustic EP, Rearranged and Unplugged, on February 8, 2012. On May 29, 2012, founding member Josiah Prince announced he was leaving the band. On July 13, 2012, the band announced that they were going to break up. The lead singer said in a blog that he, his wife and Josh would be working on a new project. Philmont's last concert was August 31, 2012, at Lifelight Festival in Worthing, South Dakota.

== Members ==
=== Former members ===
- Scott Taube - lead vocals (2005–12)
- Josiah Prince - lead guitar, keyboards, backing vocals (2005–12) Now in Disciple
- Josh Guion - rhythm guitar, bass, backing vocals (2010–12)
- Justin Sams - rhythm guitar, background vocals, bass (2007–11)
- Abe Hege - drums, bass (2005–07)
- Matthew Arcaini - bass guitar (2005–06)
- Todd Davis - drums (2007–10)
- Jeremi Hough - drums (2010–11)
- Ethan Ricks - bass (2007)
- Charlee Bombay - bass (2006)

== Discography ==
=== Albums ===
- Take Cover EP (2006) - independent
- Photosynthetic EP (2007) - independent
- Oh Snap EP (2008) - Forefront Records
- Attention (2009) - Forefront Records
- The Transition EP (2010) - independent
- Rearranged and Unplugged (2012) - independent

=== Singles ===
- "I Can't Stand to Fall" - Peaked at No. 5 on Christian Rock Radio
- "The Difference" - Peaked at No. 3 on Christian Rock Radio (also placed on the X 2009 Christian Rock Hits compilation)
- "Where to Start" - Peaked at No. 3 on Christian Rock Radio
- "Back Down"
- "You Will Remain"
- "Closer"
