= The Transition EP =

EP by Philmont
- Released: October 19th, 2010
- Recorded: Nashville, Tennessee; Charlotte, North Carolina
- Genre: Christian rock, pop punk
- Length: 21:15
- Label: Independent
- Producer: Matthew Arcaini

Philmont chronology
Attention (2009)	The Transition EP (2010)

Professional ratings
Review scores
Source	Rating
Indie Vision Music	8/10 stars
Jesus Freak Hideout	3.5/5 stars
Christian Rock 20	4/5 stars
Christian Music Review	(8.4/10)
1340 Mag	(favorable)

The Transition EP is the follow-up to Christian rock band Philmont's full-length Attention, and their first release since parting ways with Forefront Records. Philmont released the EP independently on October 19, 2010. It is available via digital outlets such as iTunes, at Philmont concerts, and through Philmont's online merchandise store.

During the recording process, Philmont realized that they did not have sufficient funding to mix and master the six songs they had been working on. They set up an online fundraiser via Kickstarter and set a goal of $4,000 toward which fans could pledge. In return, backers were offered exclusive rewards from the band (signed copies of the EP, bonus tracks, T-shirts, personalized videos, etc.) that got better with increasing investment amounts. Philmont surpassed their goal, and the fundraiser ended with $5,404 raised; they were able to release The Transition EP on October 19, as planned.

== Track listing ==
All songs written by Scott Taube and Josiah Prince except where noted.

1. "I Am" - 3:39
2. "You Will Remain" (Taube/Prince/Allen Salmon) - 3:25
3. "The Alchemist" - 3:36
4. "Ringing In My Head" - (Taube/Prince/Salmon) - 3:15
5. "Closer" - 3:43
6. "The Last Song I Sing" (Taube/Prince/Tony Wood) - 3:39

Bonus tracks for Kickstarter donors

1. "Closer (Acoustic)"
2. "Shuttle Launch (Demo)"

== Personnel ==
Philmont

- Scott Taube - lead vocals
- Josiah Prince - guitar, keyboards, programming, vocals, additional production
- Justin Sams - guitar, vocals, gang vocals
- Josh Guion - bass guitar
- Jeremi Hough - drums, percussion, gang vocals

Additional personnel

- Matthew Arcaini - production, programming, gang vocals
- Jordan Messer - gang vocals
- Matt Underwood - acoustic guitar (track 2)
- Lee Bridges (mixing, tracks 1, 3, & 5)
- Ainslie Grosser (mixing, track 2)
- Allen Salmon (mixing, tracks 4 & 6)
- Dan Shike - mastering

== Music videos ==
- "Closer" on YouTube
