= Party Bass =

Single by Bombs Away featuring The Twins
- Released: November 2012
- Recorded: 2012
- Genre: Electro house
- Length: 3:37 (radio edit)
- Label: Shock Records

Bombs Away singles chronology
"Get Stoopid" (2012)	"Party Bass" (2012)	"Drunk Arcade" (2013)

"Party Bass" is a song recorded by Australian DJ vocal and producer duo Bombs Away featuring The Twins. The song was released digitally in November 2012 and remixes followed. The song peaked at number 25 on the Australian ARIA Charts and was certified platinum in 2013.

At the ARIA Music Awards of 2013, the song was nominated for Song of the Year.

== Track listing ==
- Digital download
1. "Party Bass" (Original Radio Edit) – 3:41
2. "Party Bass" (Original Extended) – 4:48
3. "Party Bass" (Krunk! Remix) – 5:21
- Digital download (Remixes 1)
1. "Party Bass" (Calvertron remix) – 5:24
2. "Party Bass" (Krunk! Remix) – 5:24
3. "Party Bass" (Uberjakd Remix) – 5:00
4. "Party Bass" (Apocalypto Remix) – 5:49
5. "Party Bass" (Tenzin Remix) – 4:45
- Digital download (Remixes 2)
1. "Party Bass" (Kronic Trap remix) – 4:40
2. "Party Bass" (Science Remix) – 3:53
3. "Party Bass" (Kairo Kingdom Remix) – 5:18
4. "Party Bass" (Reece Low Remix) – 5:07
5. "Party Bass" (Mikael Wills Remix) – 4:45
6. "Party Bass" (Komes Remix) – 5:35

== Charts ==
=== Weekly charts ===
Chart (2012/13)	Peak position
Australia (ARIA)	25

=== Year-end charts ===
Chart (2012)	Position
Australian Artist (ARIA)	27
Chart (2013)	Position
Australian Artist (ARIA)	31

== Certification ==
Region	Certification	Certified units/sales
Australia (ARIA)	Platinum	70,000^{^}
^{^} Shipments figures based on certification alone.

== Release history ==
Country	Date	Format	Label	Catalogue
Australia	November 2012	Digital download	Shock Records	DN0343
Australia	April 2013	Digital download	Shock Records	
Australia	April 2013	Digital download	Shock Records	
