= Bend Ova =

Single by Lil Jon featuring Tyga
- Released: July 22, 2014
- Recorded: 2014
- Genre: Trap; crunk
- Length: 3:46
- Label: Epic
- Songwriters: Jonathan Smith; Micheal Stevenson; Luke Calleja; Michael Mayeda; Luke Wylde
- Producers: Lil Jon; Kronic; Dawg

Lil Jon singles chronology
"Turn Down for What" (2013)	"Bend Ova" (2014)	"Literally I Can't" (2014)

Tyga singles chronology
"Hookah" (2014)	"Bend Ova" (2014)	"Bubblegum" (2014)

"Bend Ova" is a single by American rapper Lil Jon released on July 22, 2014, as the follow-up to his highly successful single "Turn Down for What". The track features a guest verse by American rapper Tyga, and was produced by Lil Jon and Australian DJ and producer Kronic.

== Chart performance ==
=== Weekly charts ===
Chart (2014)	Peak position
Australia (ARIA)	48
Canada (Canadian Hot 100)	53
Germany (Deutsche Black Charts)	3
New Zealand (Recorded Music NZ)	40
US Billboard Hot 100	92
US Hot Dance/Electronic Songs (Billboard)	10
US Hot Rap Songs (Billboard)	19
US Rhythmic (Billboard)	13
US Pop Airplay (Billboard)	38

=== Year-end charts ===
Chart (2014)	Position
US Hot Dance/Electronic Songs (Billboard)	29
Chart (2015)	Position
US Hot Dance/Electronic Songs (Billboard)	92
