= Squats (song) =

Single by Oh Snap! and Bombs Away
- Released: 10 April 2015
- Genre: Electro house
- Length: 3:35 (radio edit)
- Label: Shock Records

Bombs Away singles chronology
"Rewind" (2015)	"Squats" (2015)	"Everybody Stand Up" (2015)

"Squats" is a song credited to Oh Snap! and Bombs Away. The song was released digitally on 10 April 2015. The song peaked at number 69 on the Australian ARIA Charts.

== Reception ==
Sights and Sound magazine said "Calling on Baltimore based rapper and MC to add more than just a dash of vocal energy to proceedings, 'Squats' moves along with driving bass, and its ass-shaking melodies that are given a boost by the rowdy rhymes of Oh Snap!." adding "Shouting out all the ladies in the dance who know how to get low, this pumping anthem is feel good from start to finish."

== Track listing ==
- Digital download
1. "Squats" (Original Radio Edit) – 3:35
- Digital download (Remixes)
1. "Squats" (Kronic & Oski Remix) – 3:13
2. "Squats" (Klaus Hill 'Fidget Flashback' Remix) – 4:35
3. "Squats" (Bounce Inc. Remix) – 3:52
4. "Squats" (Social Hooliganz Remix) – 4:51
5. "Squats" (Oh Snap! Remix) – 3:01
6. "Squats" (Sarah Robertson 'Future House' Remix) – 4:07
7. "Squats" (Lefty Remix) – 4:25
8. "Squats" (Dan Absent Remix) – 4:02
9. "Squats" (Raynor Bruges Remix) – 2:55
10. "Squats" (Prism Sound Remix) – 3:23
11. "Squats" (Liam Turner Remix) – 4:22

== Charts ==
Chart (2015)	Position
Australia Charts (ARIA)	69

== Release History ==
Country	Date	Format	Label	Catalogue
Australia	10 April 2015	Digital download	Shock Records	DN0495B
Australia	29 May 2015	Digital download	Shock Records	
