= Super Soaker (song) =

Single by Bombs Away
- Released: September 2011
- Recorded: 2011
- Genre: Electro house
- Length: 3:41 (radio edit)
- Label: Shock

Bombs Away singles chronology
"Swagger" (2011)	"Super Soaker" (2011)	"Looking for Some Girls" (2012)

"Super Soaker" is a song recorded by Australian DJ vocal and producer duo Bombs Away. The song was released digitally in September 2011 and remixes followed. The song peaked at number 83 on the Australian ARIA Charts and was certified platinum in 2012.

== Track listing ==
- Digital download
1. "Super Soaker" (Original Radio Edit) – 3:41
2. "Super Soaker" (Original Extended) – 5:37
- Digital download (Remixes)
1. "Super Soaker" (Rocket Pimp Remix) – 4:18
2. "Super Soaker" (Mobin Master & Tate Strauss Remix) – 6:22
3. "Super Soaker" (Pelussje Liquidato Remix) – 5:01
4. "Super Soaker" (Phetsta Remix) – 4:44
5. "Super Soaker" (Kronic Remix) – 4:33
6. "Super Soaker" (Smile On Impact Remix) – 6:58
7. "Super Soaker" (Rave Radio Remix) – 5:36
- Digital download (Hard Dance Mixes)
1. "Super Soaker" (Brooklyn Bounce Remix) – 6:14
2. "Super Soaker" (Mark Breeze Remix) – 4:49
3. "Super Soaker" (Brooklyn Bounce Remix Edit) – 3:48

== Charts ==
Chart (2010/11)	Peak position
Australia (ARIA)	83

== Certification ==
Region	Certification	Certified units/sales
Australia (ARIA)	Platinum	70,000^{^}
^{^} Shipments figures based on certification alone.

== Release history ==
Country	Date	Format	Label	Catalogue
Australia	September 2011	Digital download	Shock Records	DN0208
Australia	12 November 2011	Digital download	Shock Records	DN0215
Australia	12 November 2011	Digital download	Shock Records	DN0215A
