= The Twins (Australian duo) =

Australian musical duo

- Origin: Gold Coast, Queensland, Australia
- Genres: Electro house, Melbourne bounce, trap
- Years active: 2010–present
- Labels: Central Station, Ministry of Sound Australia, Bomb Squad Records, Cloud 9 Records, Kontor Records, Radikal Records
- Members: Brooke Kelaart; Ellie Kelaart
- Website: www.thetwins.com.au

Brooke Kelaart and Ellie Kelaart are an Australian EDM, electro house and progressive house duo, better known by their stage name The Twins. After signing with Sony/ATV Music Publishing at 18 years of age, the sisters pursued careers as songwriting partners and, in 2008, they signed with Fredrik Olsson and his Swedish music publishing company Razor Boy Music Publishing.
