= Oh Snap (EP) =

EP by Philmont
- Released: August 19, 2008 (digital); April 21, 2009 (CD)
- Genre: Christian rock, pop punk
- Length: 17:26
- Label: Forefront
- Producer: Rob Hawkins

Professional ratings
Review scores
Source	Rating
AbsolutePunk	64%
The Celebrity Cafe	4.5/10 stars
Christianity Today	Neutral
Indie Vision	7/10 stars
Jesus Freak Hideout	2.5/5 stars

Oh Snap is Christian rock band Philmont's major label debut EP. It was digitally released on August 19, 2008, and was released to retail stores on April 21, 2009, with "The Ascension" included. It was produced by Rob Hawkins in Nashville, Tennessee, except for "The Ascension", which was produced by former Philmont bassist Matthew Arcaini. "The Difference" placed on the X 2009 Christian Rock Hits compilation as a bonus track.

== Track listing ==
1. "I Can't Stand to Fall"
2. "The Difference"
3. "Another Name"
4. "My Hippocratic Oath"
5. "Photosynthetic"
6. "The Ascension" - only included on 2009 release

Note: Track 5 is a re-recording of the song "Murder & Photography", from the band's independent Photosynthetic EP. Only the 2009 release of Oh Snap includes "The Ascension", a re-arrangement of a song by the same name from the Photosynthetic EP.

== Band ==
- Scott McTaube- vocals and rhythm guitar
- Josiah Prince - guitar, piano and background vocals
- Justin Sams -bass and background vocals
- Todd Davis - drums and percussion
